= Goulburn Valley Highway =

Highway in Victoria, Australia

Goulburn Valley Highway Victoria
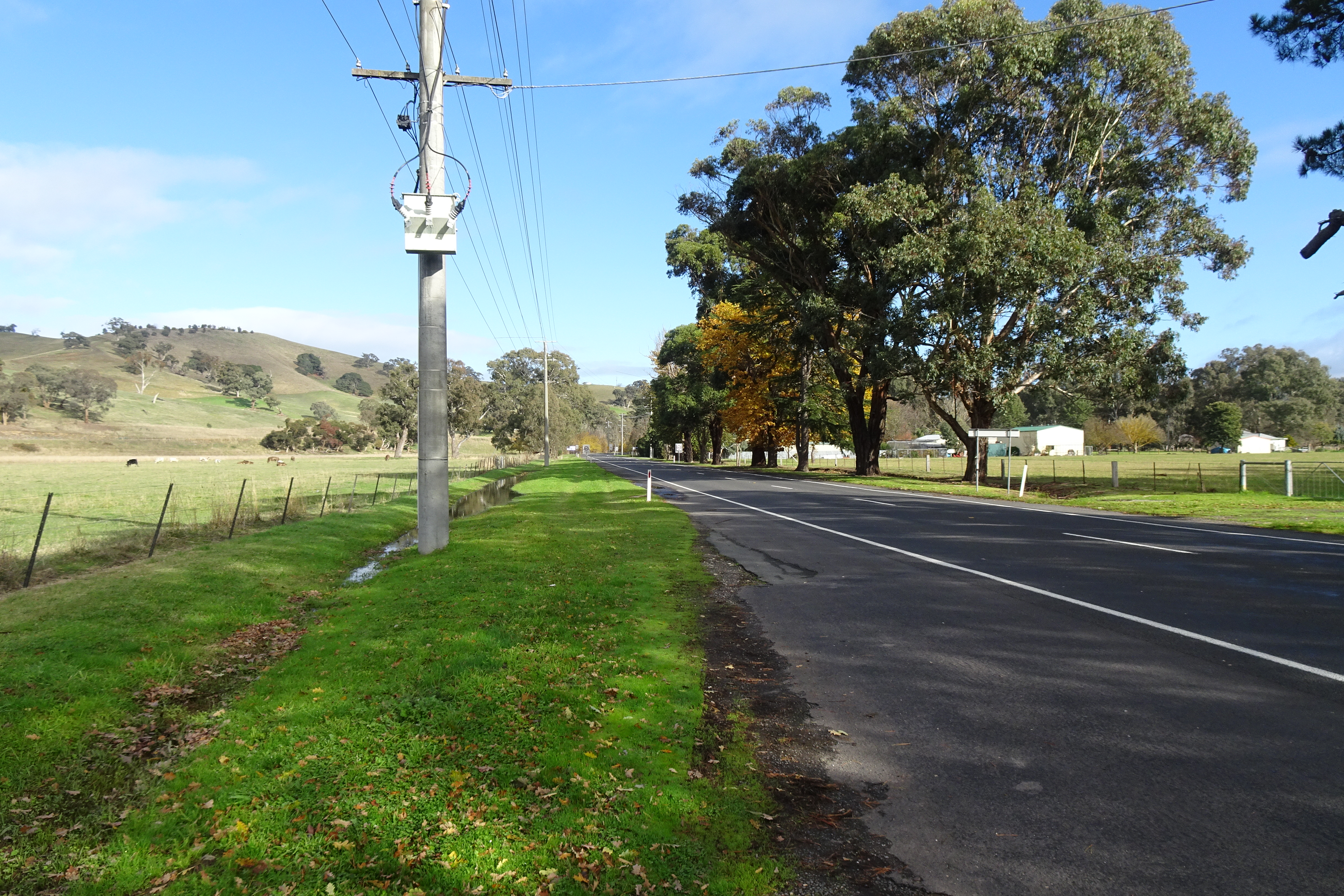
- Goulburn Valley Highway passing through Molesworth
- Coordinates: 35.813777°S 145.558644°E (North end); 37.234141°S 145.910370°E (South end)

General information
- Type: Highway
- Length: 255.7 km (159 mi)
- Gazetted: November 1914 (as Main Road); 1946/47 (as State Highway)
- Route number(s): A39 (2013–present) (VIC/NSW border–Arcadia); M39 (2013–present) (Arcadia–Seymour); B340 (1998–present) (Seymour–Eildon); Concurrencies: B300 (1998–present) (Yea–Cathkin); B400 (1998–present) (Strathmerton–Yarroweyah)
- Former route number: National Highway A39 (1997–2013) (VIC/NSW border–Arcadia); National Highway M39 (2001–2013) (Arcadia–Seymour); National Highway 39 (1992–1997) (VIC/NSW border–Seymour); National Route 39 (1965–1992) (VIC/NSW border–Seymour); State Route 168 (1986–1998) (Seymour–Eildon); Concurrencies: State Route 153 (1986–1998) (Yea–Cathkin); National Route 16 (1955–1998) (Strathmerton–Yarroweyah)

Major junctions
- North end: Newell Highway; VIC/NSW border
- Murray Valley Highway; Midland Highway; Hume Freeway; Melba Highway; Maroondah Highway
- South end: Eildon Road; Eildon, Victoria

Location(s)
- Region: Hume
- Major settlements: Strathmerton, Shepparton, Nagambie, Seymour, Yea, Alexandra

Highway system
- Highways in Australia; National Highway • Freeways in Australia; Highways in Victoria

Goulburn Valley Highway is a highway located in Victoria, Australia, linking Tocumwal on the Murray River through North Central Victoria to Eildon. The section north of the Hume Freeway (part of which is Goulburn Valley Freeway) is part of the Melbourne to Brisbane National Highway (together with Hume Freeway) and is the main link between these two cities, as well as a major link between Victoria and inland New South Wales. It is also the most direct route between Melbourne and the major regional centre of Shepparton in Victoria (via Hume Freeway).

== Route ==
Goulburn Valley Highway commences on the southern bank of the Murray River, forming the interstate border with New South Wales, and continues south from Newell Highway in Tocumwal into Victoria as a two-lane, single carriageway rural highway, until it reaches the intersection with Murray Valley Highway in Yarroweyah and heads west concurrently with it until Strathmerton, where it heads south again on its own alignment, through Numurkah until it reaches the major regional centre of Shepparton, where it widens to a four-lane, dual-carriageway road. It continues south, narrowing back to a two-lane, single carriageway road south of Shepparton until Arcadia, where it widens again to a four-lane, dual-carriageway route and becomes Goulburn Valley Freeway, following the course of the Goulburn River and heading in a south-westerly direction past Nagambie eventually to reach the interchange with Hume Freeway on the northern fringes of Seymour, where it reverts to a two-lane, single carriageway road as Goulburn Valley Highway and runs through Seymour, then heads in an easterly direction through the towns of Yea, Alexandra, Thornton, before eventually terminating in the centre of Eildon, the gateway town to the Lake Eildon region.

The road serves the fruit and vegetable growing areas of Goulburn Valley in Victoria, one of Australia's most productive agricultural regions.

The freeway section is covered with a speed limit of 110 km/h, the standard speed limit for rural freeways in Australia.

== History ==
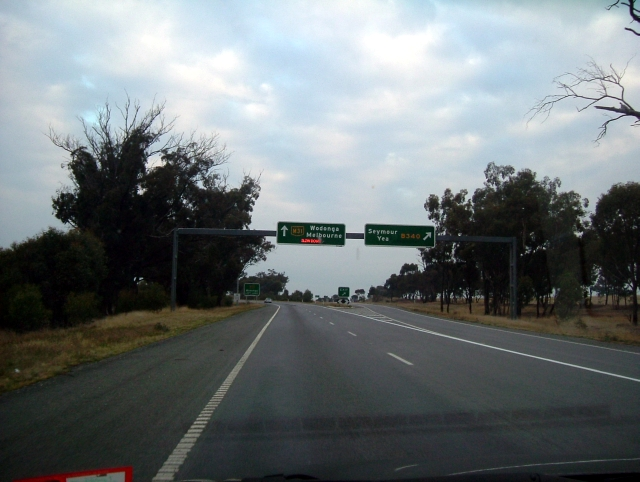
Goulburn Valley Highway exit to Seymour and Yea near Hume Freeway

The passing of the Country Roads Act 1912 through the Parliament of Victoria provided for the establishment of the Country Roads Board (later VicRoads) and their ability to declare Main Roads, taking responsibility for the management, construction and care of the state's major roads from local municipalities. Upper Goulburn Road was declared a Main Road, from Alexandra to Thornton on 16 November 1914, from Tallarook through Trawool and Yea to Molesworth on 30 November 1914, and from Molesworth to Alexandra on 20 September 1915; Goulburn Valley Road from Seymour through Nagambie to Murchison was declared a Main Road on 30 November 1914; Shepparton-Numurkah(-Cobram) Road between Shepparton through Numurkah and Katunga to Strathmerton was declared a Main Road on 17 March 1915; and Shepparton-Murchison(-Nagambie Road) was declared a Main Road, between Shepparton and Arcadia on 17 March 1915, and between Arcadia and Murchison on 20 September 1915.

The passing of the Highways and Vehicles Act 1924 provided for the declaration of State Highways, roads two-thirds financed by the atate government through the Country Roads Board. Goulburn Valley Highway was declared a State Highway in the 1946/47 financial year, from Seymour via Murchison and Shepparton to Strathmerton (for a total of 88 miles), subsuming the original declarations of Goulburn Valley Road, Shepparton-Murchison-Nagambie Road and Shepparton-Numurhak-Cobram Road as Main Roads. In the 1959/60 financial year, the eastern section from Eildon via Alexandra and Yea to Seymour was added, subsuming the original declaration of Upper Goulburn Road between Eildon and Trawool where it crossed the Goulburn River, and then along Seymour-Yea Road to Seymour. The last section, from Yarroweyah to the border with NSW just outside Tocumwal, was added in June 1983, along Benalla-Tocumwal Road north of Murray Valley Highway. The section of the highway between Shepparton and Strathmerton was re-aligned in September 1985: from running through Numurkah and Katunga on the eastern side of the Tocumwal railway line to meet Murray Valley Highway in Strathmerton, to its current alignment (formerly called Ancliffe Road) bypassing Numurkah on the western side of the railway to meet Murray Valley Highway 4 kilometres west of Strathmerton; the former alignment is now known as Tocumwal Road through Numurkah, and Numurkah Road beyond to Strathmerton.

The Whitlam government introduced the federal National Roads Act 1974, where roads declared as a National Highway were still the responsibility of the states for road construction and maintenance, but were fully compensated by the Federal government for money spent on approved projects. As an important interstate link between the capitals of Victoria and Queensland, Goulburn Valley Highway was declared a National Highway between Seymour and Tocumwal in 1992.

Plans to convert the highway into a freeway-standard road between Seymour and Shepparton dated from 1992, as a direct result of its declaration as a National Highway. Construction on the first section to be converted into Goulburn Valley Freeway, 16 km from the interchange with Hume Freeway in Seymour to just south of Nagambie, started in January 1999; this included the relocation of the Aboriginal Scar Tree, a dead tree bearing scars where wood had been cut for a shield or dish, in consultation with the local Taungurung Aboriginal People, and who also attended the opening ceremony in a new south-bound rest area in April 2001. The Murchison East deviation opened in February 2003 (almost eleven months early), allowing a more-direct alignment of the road instead of via Murchison East and Moorlim and shortening the distance between Melbourne and Shepparton by 4 km. The freeway upgrade has made sections of the original Goulburn Valley Highway redundant, either incorporated into the new freeway or acting as local access roads. The duplication of a separate section of the highway into freeway standard through Arcadia was completed in 2008, and the bypass of Nagambie and Murchison connecting both sections of freeway was completed in 2013.

Goulburn Valley Highway was signed as National Route 39 between Seymour and Tocumwal in 1965 (later upgraded to National Highway 39 in 1992), and State Route 168 between Seymour and Eildon in 1986. With Victoria's conversion to the newer alphanumeric system in the late 1990s, this was updated to route A39 between Seymour and Tocumwal, and replaced by B340 from Seymour to Eildon. As stages of the highway north of Seymour are successively converted to freeway-standard, these sections are updated from route A39 to route M39.

The passing of the Road Management Act 2004 granted the responsibility of overall management and development of Victoria's major arterial roads to VicRoads: in 2011, VicRoads re-declared this road as Goulburn Valley Freeway (Freeway #1640), between Seymour and Arcadia, while re-declaring the remnants between Eildon and the interstate border with New South Wales as Goulburn Valley Highway (Arterial #6640).

=== Timeline of upgrade ===
- 2001 – Hume Freeway to Nagambie, 16 km opened in April 2001, at a cost of $53 million.
- 2003 – Murchison East deviation, 18 km opened on 18 February 2003, at a cost of $88.9 million.
- 2008 – Arcadia duplication, 10 km opened in June 2008, at a cost of $40.5 million.
- 2013 – Nagambie bypass, 17 km bypass opened at the end of April 2013.

=== Arcadia duplication ===
The duplication was a $40.55 million project funded by the Australian Government as part of its Auslink Program. The works involved duplication of 10 km of the existing Goulburn Valley Highway between the Murchison East deviation and the proposed Shepparton Bypass, just north of Ross Road, through Arcadia. It incorporates four at-grade intersections, frontage access roads, a rest area with full facilities, and wire rope safety barriers.

The Arcadia section runs adjacent to the Calder Woodburn Memorial Avenue of Honour. A Conservation Management Plan was developed in consultation with Heritage Victoria to ensure that impact on the Avenue of Honour was minimised. The plans included measures to enhance and highlight the avenue of trees. The project was started in June 2006, open to traffic in February 2008, with final completion of all works in April 2008.

The highway carries an estimated 6,500 vehicles per day, including more than 2,000 commercial vehicles.

=== Nagambie bypass ===
The Nagambie Bypass, funded as part of the Auslink 2 (2009–2014) Federal Government infrastructure program, bypasses the town of Nagambie to the east. Funding was announced in May 2009, and construction commenced in December 2009. The bypass opened to traffic in April 2013.

Costed at $222 million, $177.6 million was contributed by the Australian Government, with the remaining $44.4 million from the State Government. The project was made up of two sections: duplicating the existing highway north of Nagambie for 3.5 km between Kirwans Bridge-Longwood Road and Moss Road (completed in November 2011), and the 13.5 km bypass road from Mitchellstown Road to Kirwans Bridge-Longwood Road.

=== Shepparton bypass ===
An alignment for the Shepparton bypass has been decided, connecting with the northern terminus of the existing Goulburn Valley Freeway in Arcadia, heading northwest to cross the Goulburn River at Toolamba, travel west and then north around Mooroopna, to rejoin the existing highway north of Congupna.

It was proposed that the Shepparton Bypass would be funded by Auslink 2 (2009–2014); the 2017/18 State Budget allocated $10.2 million over three years to undertake preparatory works and land acquisition, and a consultation was held with the community for its initial stage in 2018. The current priority is Stage 1, a single carriageway with a lane in each direction extending from the Midland Highway west of Mooroopna to the Goulburn Valley Highway via an upgraded Wanganui Road in Shepparton North, a total distance of 10 km; the Federal Government has also contributed $208 million, for an estimated project cost of $260 million for Stage 1. The project is still under planning with a date to begin construction still to be set.

=== Strathmerton deviation ===
A realignment would have bypassed the small townships of Strathmerton and Yarroweyah and avoid dangerous bends south of the Murray River crossing at Tocumwal. The proposed new route would have crossed the Murray Valley Highway instead of follow it through those towns, and rejoin the current route just south of the Murray River.

The proposed Strathmerton Deviation was also to be funded by Auslink 2 (2009–2014) but had also not been constructed by the beginning of 2017.

== Major intersections and towns ==
LGA	Location	km	mi	Destinations	Notes
State border		0.0	0.0	Victoria – New South Wales state border	
Moira	Koonoomoo	0.0	0.0	Newell Highway (A39) – Tocumwal, Dubbo, Goondiwindi	Northern terminus of northern section of highway, route A39 continues north into NSW as Newell Highway
Moira	Koonoomoo	9.7	6.0	Cobram–Koonoomoo Road (C367) – Cobram, Yarrawonga	
Moira	Yarroweyah	14.2	8.8	Murray Valley Highway (B400 east) – Benalla, Cobram, Yarrawonga	Eastern terminus of concurrency with route B400
Moira	Strathmerton	23.4	14.5	Tocumwal railway line	
Moira	Strathmerton	28.5	17.7	Murray Valley Highway (B400 west) – Nathalia, Echuca, Kerang, Swan Hill	Western terminus of concurrency with route B400
Moira	Numurkah	46.0	28.6	Katamite–Nathalia Road (C361 west) – Nathalia	Concurrency with route C361
Moira	Numurkah	47.8	29.7	Katamatite–Nathalia Road (C361 east) – Katamatite	Concurrency with route C361
Greater Shepparton	Congupna	70.4	43.7	Katamatite–Shepparton Road (C363) – Katamatite	
Greater Shepparton	Congupna	70.6	43.9	Grahamvale Road (C391) – Euroa, Melbourne via town bypass	
Greater Shepparton	Shepparton North	74.9	46.5	Barmah–Shepparton Road (C358) – Nathalia, Barmah	
Greater Shepparton	Shepparton	78.4	48.7	Dookie–Shepparton Road (C364) – Dookie	
Greater Shepparton	Shepparton	80.0	49.7	Midland Highway (A300) – Kyabram, Elmore, Bendigo, Benalla	
Greater Shepparton	Shepparton	81.2	50.5	Tocumwal railway line	
Broken River		82.7	51.4	Bridge name unknown	
Greater Shepparton	Kialla	85.3	53.0	Aerodrome Road – Shepparton Airport	
Greater Shepparton	Kialla	86.7	53.9	River Road (C391) – Euroa, Benalla, Tocumwal via town bypass	
Greater Shepparton	Arcadia	96.7	60.1	Ross Road (west) – Arcadia; Karramomus Road (east) – Karramomus	Southern terminus of northern section of highway and route A39; Northern terminus of freeway and route M39
Greater Shepparton	Arcadia	100.3	62.3	Euroa–Arcadia Road – Arcadia, Tamleugh	
Strathbogie	Arcadia South	101.4	63.0	Arcadia Two Chain Road – Euroa	
Strathbogie	Moorilim	107.4	66.7	Murchison–Violet Town Road (C345) – Murchison, Violet Town	
Strathbogie	Wahring	116.3	72.3	Dargalong Road – Murchison East, Wahring	
Strathbogie	Wahring	118.5	73.6	Wahring–Murchison East Road (C357) – Murchison, Rushworth, Tatura	
Strathbogie	Wahring	122.7	76.2	Wahring-Euroa Road – Euroa	Caltex Service Centre
Strathbogie	Kirwans Bridge	128.2	79.7	Grimwade Road (C392 west, unallocated east) – Nagambie, Longwood	
Strathbogie	Kirwans Bridge	128.7	80.0	Tocumwal railway line	
Strathbogie	Tabilk	135.5	84.2	Tocumwal railway line	
Strathbogie	Tabilk	139.7	86.8	Mitchellstown Road (C346 east, C392 west) – Nagambie, Heathcote, Avenel	
Strathbogie	Mangalore	145.3	90.3	Aerodrome Road – Mangalore, Avenel, Mangalore Airport	
Mitchell	Seymour	155.0	96.3	Hume Freeway (M31) – Melbourne, Wodonga, Sydney	Southern terminus of freeway and route M39; Northern terminus of southern section of highway and route B340
Mitchell	Seymour	160.0	99.4	Seymour–Tooborac Road (C384) – Puckapunyal, Tooborac, Melbourne	
Mitchell	Seymour	160.8	99.9	Tocumwal railway line	
Goulburn River		170.8	106.1	Bridge name unknown	
Mitchell	Whiteheads Creek	171.1	106.3	Upper Goulburn Road (C383) – Tallarook	
King Parrot Creek		181.3	112.7	Bridge name unknown	
Murrindindi	Yea	198.0	123.0	Whittlesea–Yea Road (C725) – Flowerdale, Whittlesea	
Murrindindi	Yea	198.7	123.5	Melba Highway (B300 south) – Yarra Glen, Lilydale	Concurrency with route B300
Yea River		199.3	123.8	Bridge name unknown	
Goulburn River		212.3	131.9	Bridge name unknown	
Murrindindi	Cathkin	216.4	134.5	Maroondah Link Highway (B300 north) – Bonnie Doon, Mansfield, Benalla	Concurrency with route B300
Murrindindi	Koriella	223.0	138.6	Maroondah Highway (C516 north) – Bonnie Doon, Mansfield, Benalla	
Murrindindi	Alexandra	229.9	142.9	Maroondah Highway (B360 south) – Marysville, Healesville, Lilydale	
Goulburn River		239.2	148.6	Gilmore's Bridge	
Murrindindi	Thornton	242.3	150.6	Taggerty–Thornton Road (C515) – Taggerty, Melbourne	
Goulburn River		255.4	158.7	Bridge name unknown	
Murrindindi	Eildon	255.7	158.9	Eildon Road – Eildon	Southern terminus of southern section highway and route B340
1.000 mi = 1.609 km; 1.000 km = 0.621 mi: Concurrency terminus; Route transition

== See also ==
- Highways in Australia
- List of highways in Victoria
- Freeways in Australia § Victoria
