= List of places on the Victorian Heritage Register in the City of Greater Shepparton =

This is a list of places on the Victorian Heritage Register in the City of Greater Shepparton in Victoria, Australia. The Victorian Heritage Register is maintained by the Heritage Council of Victoria.

The Victorian Heritage Register, as of 2026, lists the following ten state-registered places within the City of Greater Shepparton:

Place name	Place #	Location	Suburb or Town	Co-ordinates	Built	State registered	Photo
Albanian Mosque, Shepparton	VHR H2425	8 Acacia Street	Shepparton	36.365204°S 145.418610°E	1956	13 October 2022	
Bangerang Cultural Centre	VHR H1082	45 Parkside Drive	Shepparton	36.355222°S 145.387917°E	1982	30 September 2004	
Calder Woodburn Memorial Avenue	VHR H1975	Goulburn Valley Highway	Arcadia; Kialla West; Kialla; Arcadia South	36.582806°S 145.337361°E	1945	6 December 2001	
Day's Flour Mill Complex	VHR H1523	77 Day Road	Murchison	36.676861°S 145.205222°E	1865	22 October 1975	
Dhurringile	VHR H1554	870 Murchison-Tatura Road	Dhurringile	36.521389°S 145.227333°E	1877	20 August 1982	
German War Cemetery	VHR H2347	155 Winter Road	Tatura	36.429556°S 145.205000°E	1958	13 August 2015	
Gregory's Bridge Hotel	VHR H0963	10 High Road	Murchison East	36.616361°S 145.221639°E	1868	25 March 1993	
Italian Ossario	VHR H2405	21 Old Weir Road	Murchison	36.627603°S 145.223390°E	1958	8 October 2020	
Murchison Prisoner of War Camp	VHR H2388	410-510 Wet Lane	Murchison	36.584389°S 145.159139°E	1941	11 October 2018	
Number One Internment Camp	VHR H2048	1320 Stewart Road	Dhurringile	36.539361°S 145.177194°E	1940	9 June 2005	
Tatura World War II Internment and POW Camps Collection	VHR H2373	49 Hogan St	Tatura	36.439750°S 145.222500°E	1940	10 August 2017	
