= Shire of Euroa =

Coordinates: 36°45′S 145°34′E

- Local government area
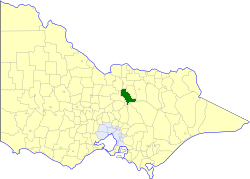
- Location in Victoria

- The Shire of Euroa as at its dissolution in 1994
- Country: Australia
- State: Victoria
- Region: Hume
- Established: 1879
- Council seat: Euroa

Area
  - Total: 1,412 km^{2} (545 sq mi)

Population
  - Total(s): 4,560 (1992)
  - Density: 3.229/km^{2} (8.364/sq mi)
- County: Anglesey, Delatite, Moira
LGAs around Shire of Euroa
Rodney	Shepparton	Violet Town
Goulburn	Shire of Euroa	Benalla
Yea	Alexandra	Mansfield

The Shire of Euroa was a local government area about 145 kilometres (90 mi) northeast of Melbourne, the state capital of Victoria, Australia. The shire covered an area of 1,412 square kilometres (545.2 sq mi), and existed from 1879 until 1994.

== History ==
Euroa was originally within the Shire of Benalla (1868), and was severed and incorporated on 3 November 1879, as the Shire of Euroa. It lost parts of several ridings when the Shire of Violet Town was created on 11 April 1895, and part of its North Riding was annexed to the Shire of Shepparton on 24 May 1911.

On 18 November 1994, the Shire of Euroa was abolished, and along with the Shires of Goulburn and Violet Town, and some neighbouring districts, was merged into the newly created Shire of Strathbogie. The Arcadia and Karramomus districts were transferred to newly created City of Greater Shepparton, whilst the Terip Terip district was transferred to the newly created Shire of Murrindindi.

== Wards ==
The Shire of Euroa was divided into three ridings on 31 May 1975, each of which elected three councillors:

- Euroa Riding
- North Riding
- South Riding

== Towns and localities ==
- Arcadia
- Balmattum
- Creightons Creek
- Euroa*
- Gooram
- Karramomus
- Kelvin View
- Kithbrook
- Miepoll
- Moglonemby
- Molka
- Sheans Creek
- Strathbogie

* Council seat.

== Population ==
Year	Population
1881	4,890
1911	5,130
1933	3,880
1954	4,476
1958	4,790*
1961	4,014
1966	4,587
1971	4,191
1976	4,251
1981	4,151
1986	4,265
1991	4,315

* Estimate in the 1958 Victorian Year Book.
