= Shire of Rodney =

Coordinates: 36°26′S 145°14′E

- Local government area
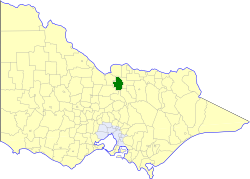
- Location in Victoria

- The Shire of Rodney as at its dissolution in 1994
- Country: Australia
- State: Victoria
- Region: Goulburn Valley
- Established: 1886
- Abolished: 18 November 1994
- Council seat: Tatura

Area
  - Total: 1,009.92 km^{2} (389.93 sq mi)

Population
  - Total: 16,110 (1992)
  - Density: 15.952/km^{2} (41.315/sq mi)
- County: Rodney
LGAs around Shire of Rodney
Deakin	Nathalia	Shepparton
Deakin	Shire of Rodney	Shepparton
Waranga	Goulburn	Euroa

The Shire of Rodney was a local government area in the Goulburn Valley region, about 170 kilometres (106 mi) north of Melbourne, the state capital of Victoria, Australia, located between Kyabram and Shepparton. The shire covered an area of 1,009.92 square kilometres (389.9 sq mi), and existed from 1886 until 1994.

== History ==
Rodney was initially part of the Waranga Road District, which was incorporated in 1863, and became a shire two years later. The Shire of Rodney was severed and incorporated on 19 March 1886. Following the secession of the Town of Kyabram on 1 April 1954, the eastern part of the shire, adjoining Shepparton and centered on Mooroopna (which had become home to the Ardmona fruit cannery in 1922), unsuccessfully attempted to secede from Rodney, a move driven by the town's Chamber of Commerce.

On 18 November 1994, the Shire of Rodney was abolished, and along with the City of Shepparton, the Shire of Shepparton and some neighbouring districts, was merged into the newly created City of Greater Shepparton. The Kyabram hinterland and some land around Lake Waranga were transferred to the newly created Shire of Campaspe.

== Wards ==
The riding boundaries of Rodney were changed and renamed in 1988. This brought about a general spill of the council, and at an election in August of that year, the following nine councilors were elected:

- North Riding; Councilors Ted Davis, John McKellar and Cheryl Phillips
- Central Riding; Councilors Tom Perry, John Gray and Kevin Walker
- South Riding; Councilors Kevin Ryan, Andrew Crawford and Ian Coldwell

== Towns and localities ==
- Byrneside
- Coomboona
- Dhurringile
- Gillieston
- Girgarre East
- Harston
- Merrigum
- Mooroopna
- St Germains
- Tatura*
- Toolamba
- Undera

* Council seat.

== Population ==
Year	Population
1954	9,181
1958	10,220*
1961	10,635
1966	11,854
1971	12,406
1976	13,402
1981	14,116
1986	14,700
1991	15,269

* Estimate in the 1958 Victorian Year Book.
