= City of Shepparton =

Coordinates: 36°23′S 145°24′E

City of Shepparton Victoria
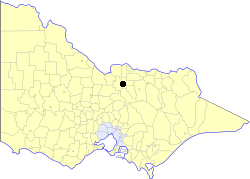
- Location in Victoria
- The City of Shepparton as at its dissolution in 1994
- Population: 26,320 (1992)
  - Density: 985.4/km^{2} (2,552.2/sq mi)
- Established: 1884
- Abolished: 18 November 1994
- Area: 26.71 km^{2} (10.3 sq mi)
- Council seat: Shepparton
- Region: Goulburn Valley
- County: Moira
LGAs around City of Shepparton:
Rodney	City of Shepparton	Shepparton

The City of Shepparton was a local government area in the Goulburn Valley region, about 180 kilometres (112 mi) north of Melbourne, the state capital of Victoria, Australia. The city covered an area of 26.71 square kilometres (10.3 sq mi), and existed from 1927 until 1994. It excluded areas such as Mooroopna and Kialla, which are now considered to be suburbs.

== History ==
On 31 May 1927, the Shepparton Riding of the Shire of Shepparton was severed, and became a borough. On 16 March 1949, it achieved city status and was proclaimed by the Governor of Victoria on 2 February 1950. The city annexed land in neighbouring districts on 26 May 1948 and 1 October 1961.

On 18 November 1994, the City of Shepparton was abolished, and along with the Shires of Rodney and Shepparton, and some neighbouring districts, was merged into the newly created City of Greater Shepparton.

== Wards ==
The City of Shepparton was divided into three wards on 31 May 1988, each of which elected three councillors:

- Central Ward
- Deakin Ward
- Wilmot Ward

== Towns and localities ==
- Grahamvale
- Shepparton*
- Shepparton North

* Council seat.

== Population ==
Year	Population
1954	10,848
1958	12,470*
1961	13,880
1966	17,504
1971	19,410
1976	21,239
1981	23,579
1986	24,744
1991	25,251

* Estimate in the 1958 Victorian Year Book.
