= Mooroopna North =

- Town
- Coordinates: 36°19′31″S 145°18′3″E
- Country: Australia
- State: Victoria
- Region: Hume
- LGA: City of Greater Shepparton

Government
  - State electorate: Shepparton
  - Federal division: Nicholls

Population
  - Total: 123 (2021 census)
- Postcode: 3629

Mooroopna North is a rural locality in Victoria, Australia, situated in the Goulburn Valley region within the City of Greater Shepparton local government area. It lies approximately 5 km north of the town of Mooroopna, near the Goulburn River. At the 2021 census, Mooroopna North had a population of 144.

== History ==
European settlement in the region began in the 1860s with pastoral runs, accelerating in the 1870s through farm selections under land acts. The locality's primary school opened in 1875.

== Geography ==
Mooroopna North is a locality in the Goulburn Valley. It is bounded by the Goulburn River to the south and east.

=== Weather ===
The area experiences a temperate climate with hot summers (average January maximum 33.8°C) and cool winters (average July maximum 14.5°C), receiving about 500 mm of annual rainfall, primarily in winter and spring.

== Demographics ==
At the 2021 census, Mooroopna North had 144 residents, an increase from 123 in 2016. The median age was 37, with 22.4% under 15 years old and 11.2% aged 65 or over. Males comprised 55.2% of the population. Approximately 3.5% identified as Aboriginal and/or Torres Strait Islander. The most common ancestries were Australian (44.4%), English (38.9%), and Irish (13.2%). English was spoken at home by 86.1% of residents. The median weekly household income was $1,416, with 58.2% of those aged 15+ in the labour force.
