= Mooroopna North West =

- Town
- Coordinates: 36°21′40″S 145°15′32″E
- Country: Australia
- State: Victoria
- Region: Hume
- LGA: City of Greater Shepparton

Government
  - State electorate: Shepparton
  - Federal division: Nicholls

Population
  - Total: 74 (2016 census)
- Postcode: 3616

Mooroopna North West is a locality in the City of Greater Shepparton, Victoria, Australia.
