= Kialla East =

- Town
- Coordinates: 36°27′24″S 145°31′46″E
- Country: Australia
- State: Victoria
- Region: Hume
- LGA: City of Greater Shepparton

Government
  - State electorate: Shepparton
  - Federal division: Nicholls

Population
  - Total: 137 (2016 census)
- Postcode: 3631

Kialla East is a locality in Victoria, Australia. It is located in the City of Greater Shepparton. At the 2016 census, Kialla East had a population of 137.
