= Tatura East =

- Town
- Coordinates: 36°26′31″S 145°17′43″E
- Country: Australia
- State: Victoria
- Region: Hume
- LGA: City of Greater Shepparton

Government
  - State electorate: Shepparton
  - Federal division: Nicholls

Population
  - Total: 284 (2011 census)
- Postcode: 3616

Tatura East is a locality in Victoria, Australia. It is located in the City of Greater Shepparton. At the 2011 census, Tatura East had a population of 284.
