= Cooma, Victoria =

Cooma
- Town
- Coordinates: 36°24′42″S 145°04′05″E
- Country: Australia
- State: Victoria
- Region: Hume
- LGA: City of Greater Shepparton

Government
  - State electorate: Shepparton
  - Federal division: Nicholls

Population
  - Total: 94 (2021 census)
- Postcode: 3616

Cooma is a town in the Goulburn Valley region of Victoria, Australia. The town is in the City of Greater Shepparton local government area, 200 kilometres (124 mi) north of the state capital, Melbourne and 33 kilometres (21 mi) west of the regional centre of Shepparton.

Cooma's Uniting Church, opened in 1926 as a memorial to those who served in World War I, closed in April 2022.
