= Cosgrove South =

- Town
- Coordinates: 36°25′3″S 145°37′53″E
- Country: Australia
- State: Victoria
- Region: Hume
- LGA: City of Greater Shepparton

Government
  - State electorate: Shepparton
  - Federal division: Nicholls

Population
  - Total: 53 (2021 census)
- Postcode: 3631

Cosgrove South is a locality in City of Greater Shepparton, Victoria, Australia. At the 2021 census, Cosgrove had a population of 53.
