= Ardmona =

- Town
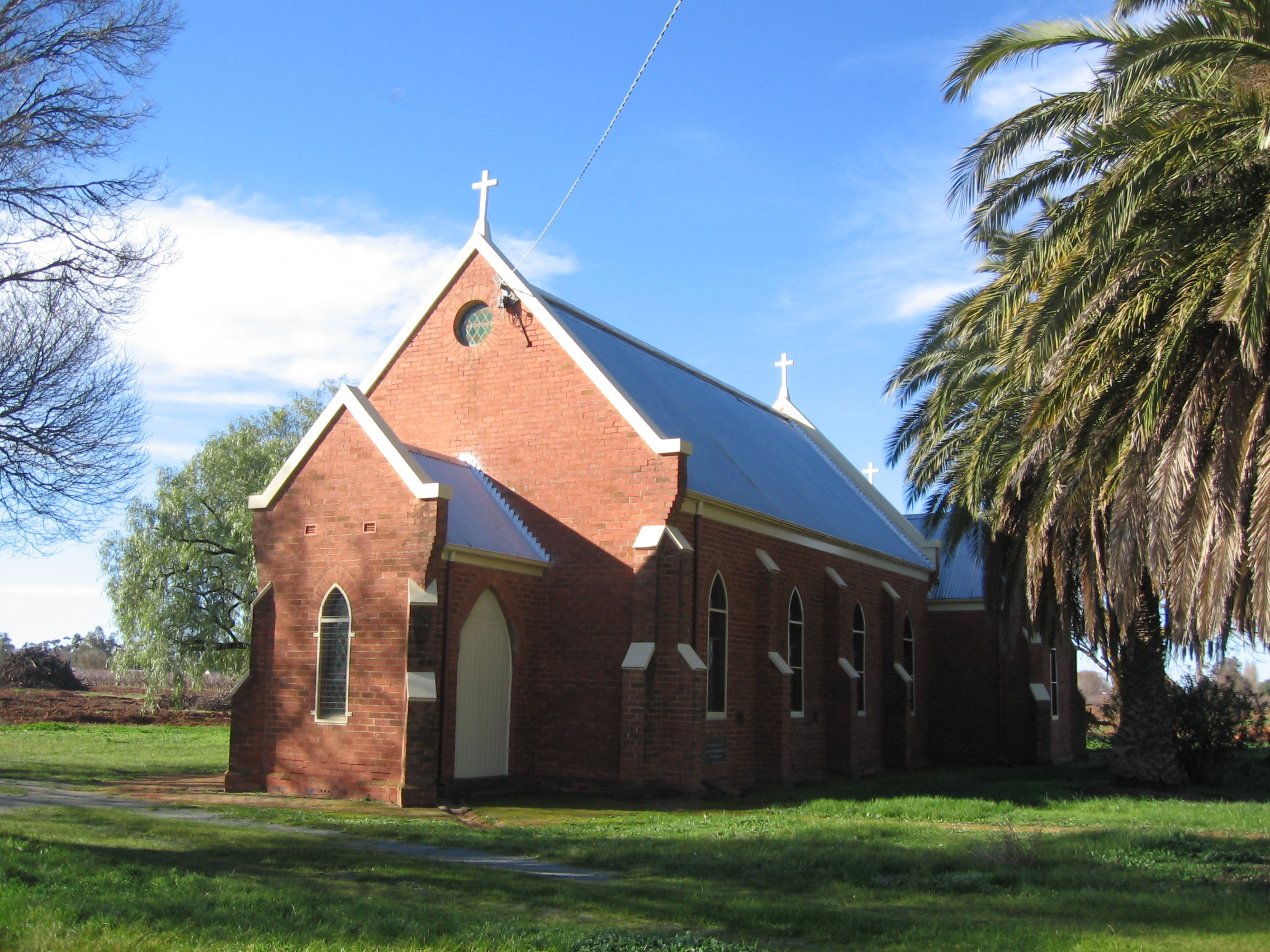
- Church located in Ardmona

- Coordinates: 36°23′S 145°18′E
- Country: Australia
- State: Victoria
- Region: Hume
- LGA: City of Greater Shepparton

Government
  - State electorate: Shepparton
  - Federal division: Nicholls

Population
  - Total: 497 (2021 census)

Ardmona is a locality in the Goulburn Valley of central Victoria, Australia. It is 10 km west of Shepparton and located in the City of Greater Shepparton local government area. The Midland Highway passes through the south of Ardmona.

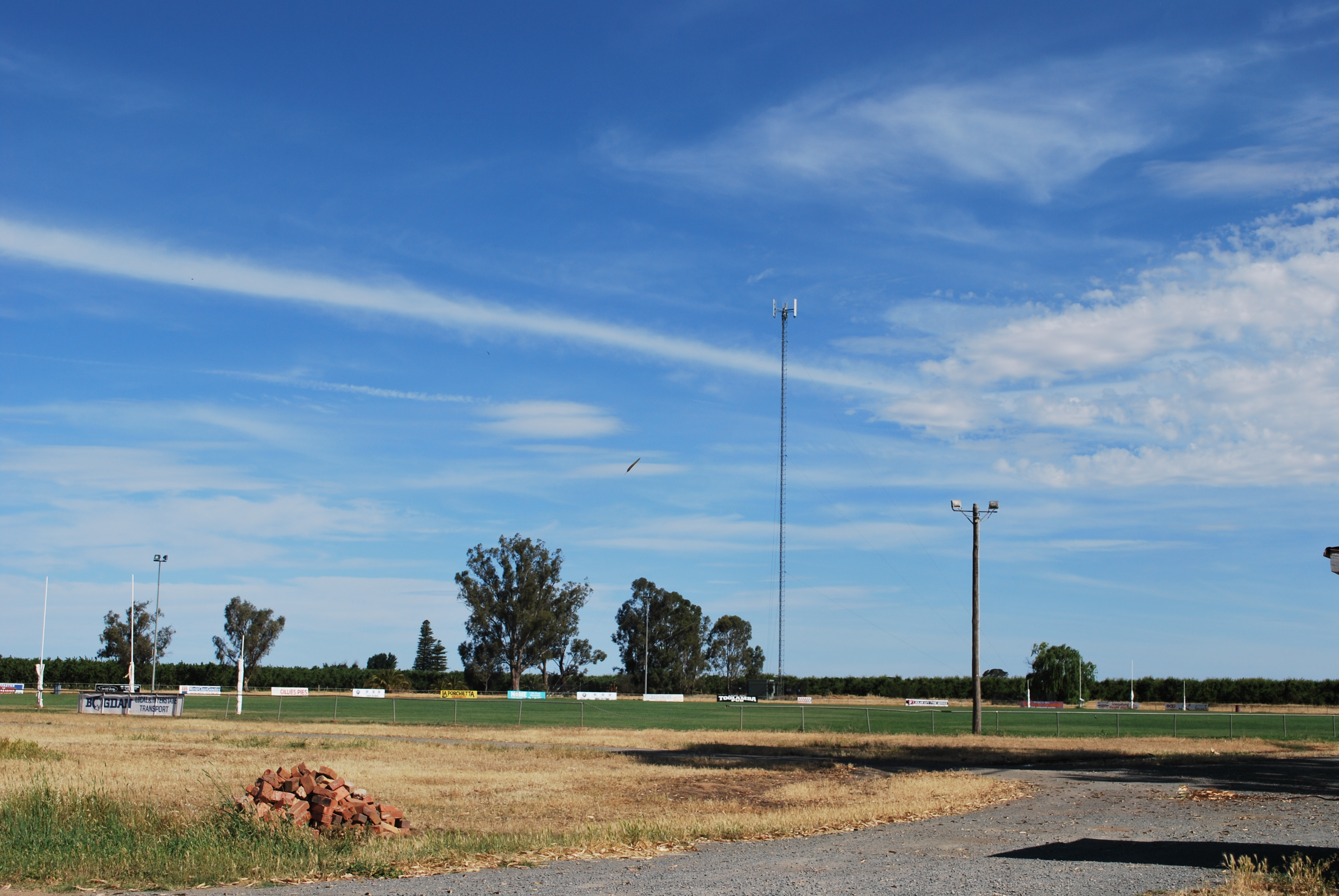
Football Field located in Ardmona

The town takes its name from a farm owned by Charles and Lochie McDonald which was purchased by a private syndicate in 1886 and subdivided to become Victoria's first irrigated settlement. One of the five members of the syndicate was horticulturist and journalist John West.

Ardmona has several amenities, including a corner shop, a primary school and a football field. SPC Ardmona, an Australian company, has its main factory located in nearby Shepparton. Ardmona used to have an Anglican church however it was sold in 2014 after being disused for more than five years.

== See also ==
- Ardmona Football Club
