= Lemnos, Victoria =

Lemnos
- Town
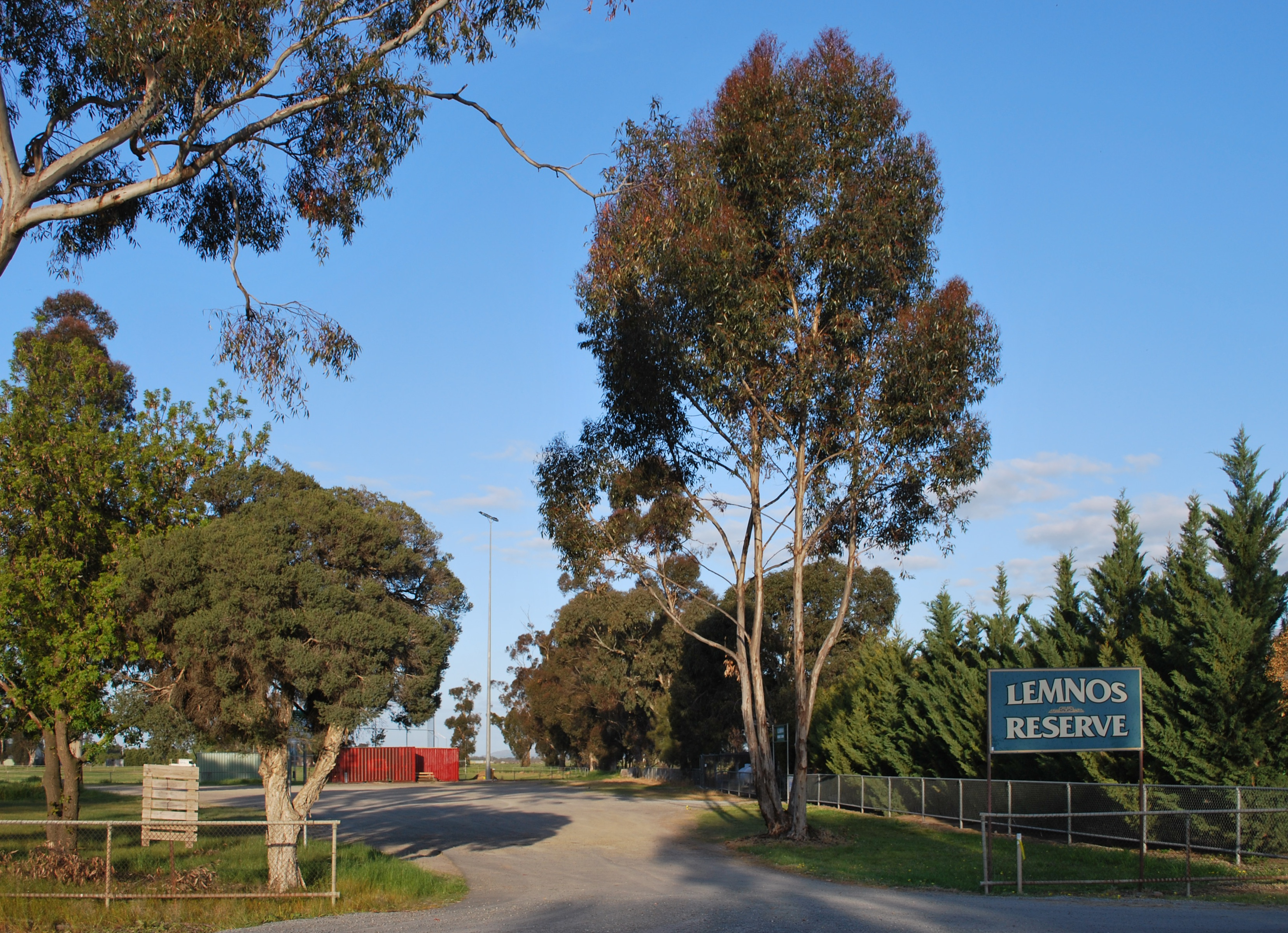
- The entry to Lemnos Reserve

- Coordinates: 36°21′S 145°27′E
- Country: Australia
- State: Victoria
- Region: Hume
- LGA: City of Greater Shepparton
- Location: 201 km (125 mi) N of Melbourne; 10 km (6.2 mi) NE of Shepparton; 63 km (39 mi) NW of Benalla

Government
  - State electorate: Shepparton
  - Federal division: Nicholls
- Elevation: 115 m (377 ft)

Population
  - Total: 246 (2016 census)
- Postcode: 3630

Lemnos is a locality in the Goulburn Valley region of Victoria, Australia, on the outskirts of the regional city of Shepparton. At the 2006 census, Lemnos had a population of 369, which had dropped to 246 at the 2016 census.

The locality was established in 1927 as a soldier settlement area after the First World War. It was named by Ernest Hill, a returned soldier and soldier settler, after the Greek island of Lemnos, which was an operational base for the Gallipoli campaign and to which wounded Australian soldiers were evacuated.

Lemnos has a state school, general store with a post office agency, and a large farming community. Lemnos is also home to the Pine Lodge Cricket Club and Campbell's factory. In 2020, Lemnos was the site of Australia's only surgical mask factory, operated by Med-Con Pty Ltd.
