= Shepparton Airport =

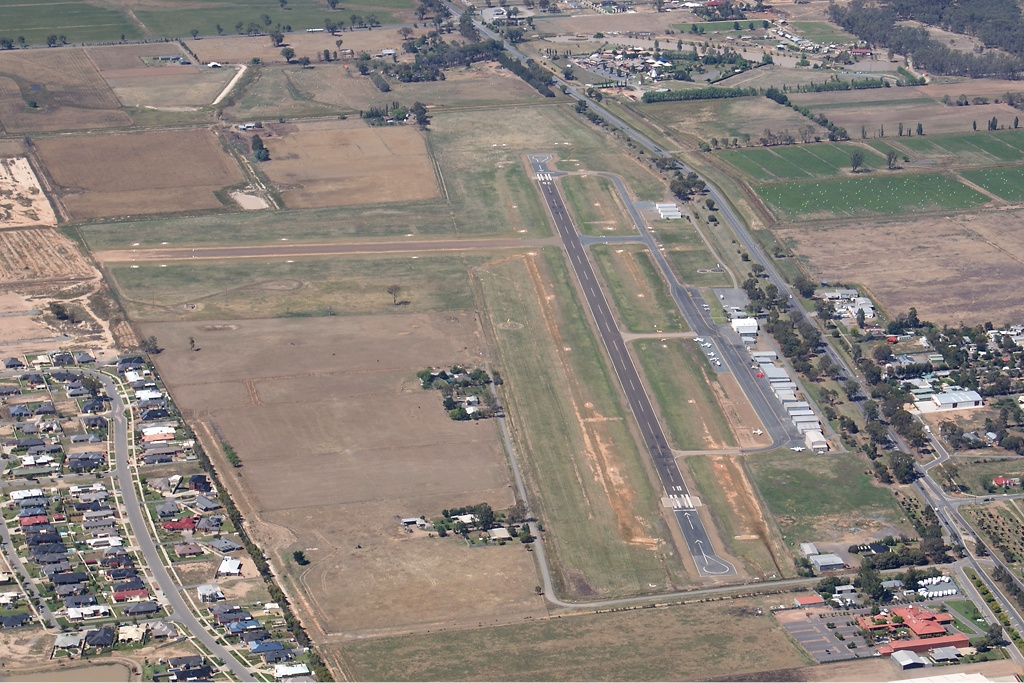
- IATA: SHT; ICAO: YSHT

Summary
- Airport type: Public
- Operator: Greater Shepparton City Council
- Location: Shepparton, Victoria
- Opened: c. 1954
- Elevation AMSL: 374 ft (114 m)
- Coordinates: 36°25′33″S 145°23′31″E
- Website: greatershepparton.com.au/region/aerodrome

Map
- Location in Victoria

Runways
Direction	Length		Surface
Direction	m	ft	Surface
09/27	423	1,388	Gravel
18/36	1,378	4,521	Asphalt
- Sources: Australian AIP and aerodrome chart

Shepparton Airport (IATA: SHT, ICAO: YSHT) is located south of Shepparton, Victoria, Australia on the Goulburn Valley Highway.

== See also ==
- List of airports in Victoria, Australia
