= Orrvale =

- Town
- Coordinates: 36°23′56″S 145°26′48″E
- Country: Australia
- State: Victoria
- Region: Hume
- LGA: City of Greater Shepparton

Government
  - State electorate: Shepparton
  - Federal division: Nicholls

Population
  - Total: 438 (2016 census)
- Postcode: 3631

Orrvale is a town in Victoria, Australia. It is located in the City of Greater Shepparton. At the 2016 census, Orrvale had a population of 438.

The town is named after William Orr, a politician and mining prospector in the early 20th century.
