= Byrneside =

- Town
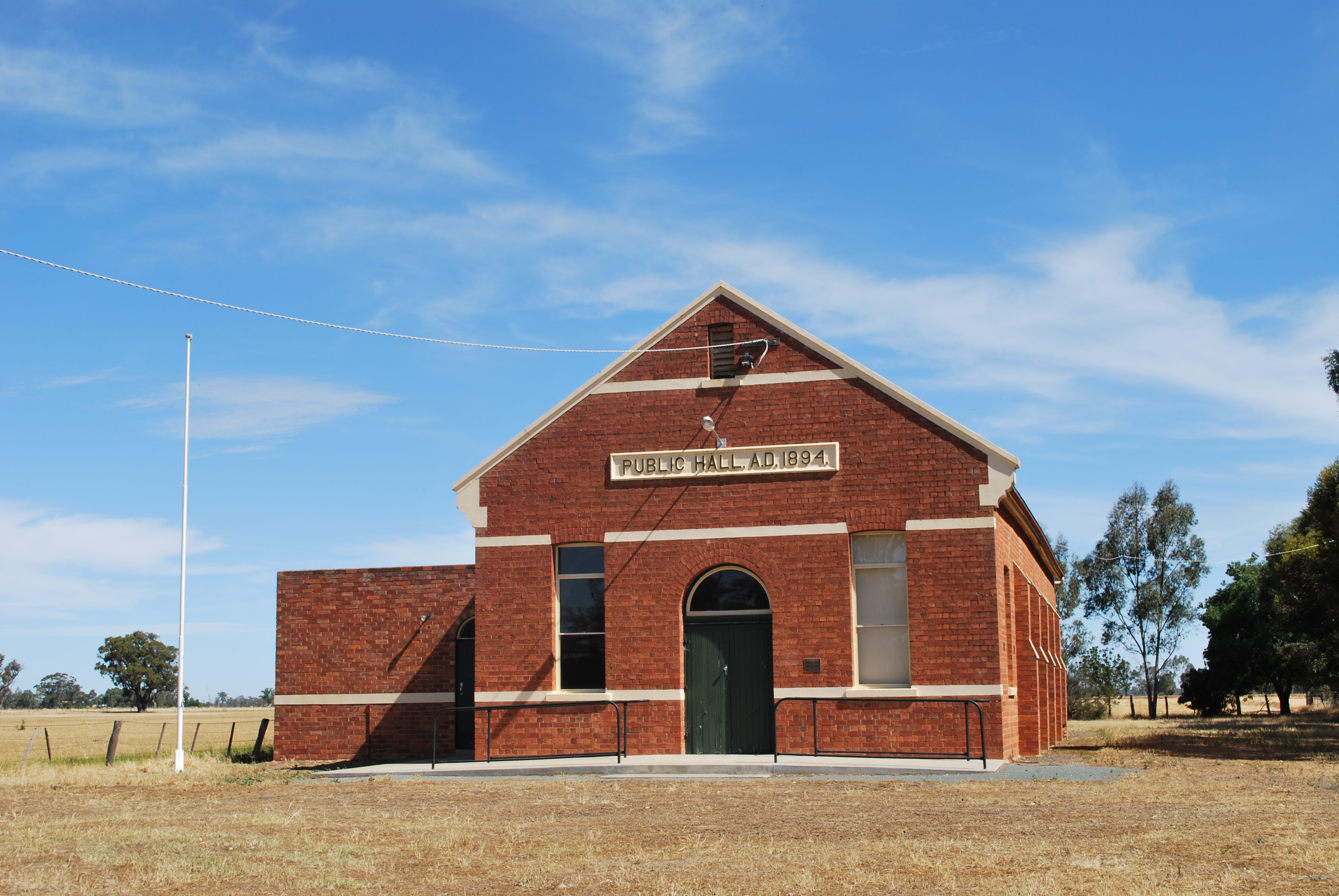
- Byrneside Public Hall, 2009

- Coordinates: 36°25′15″S 145°10′25″E
- Country: Australia
- State: Victoria
- Region: Hume
- LGA: City of Greater Shepparton
- Location: 188 km (117 mi) N of Melbourne; 21 km (13 mi) W of Shepparton; 27 km (17 mi) N of Murchison

Government
  - State electorate: Euroa
  - Federal division: Nicholls

Population
  - Total: 161 (2021 census)
- Postcode: 3617

Byrneside is a small town located in the City of Greater Shepparton, west of Shepparton in Victoria, Australia. At the 2021 census, Byrneside had a population of 161.
