= Kialla West =

- Town
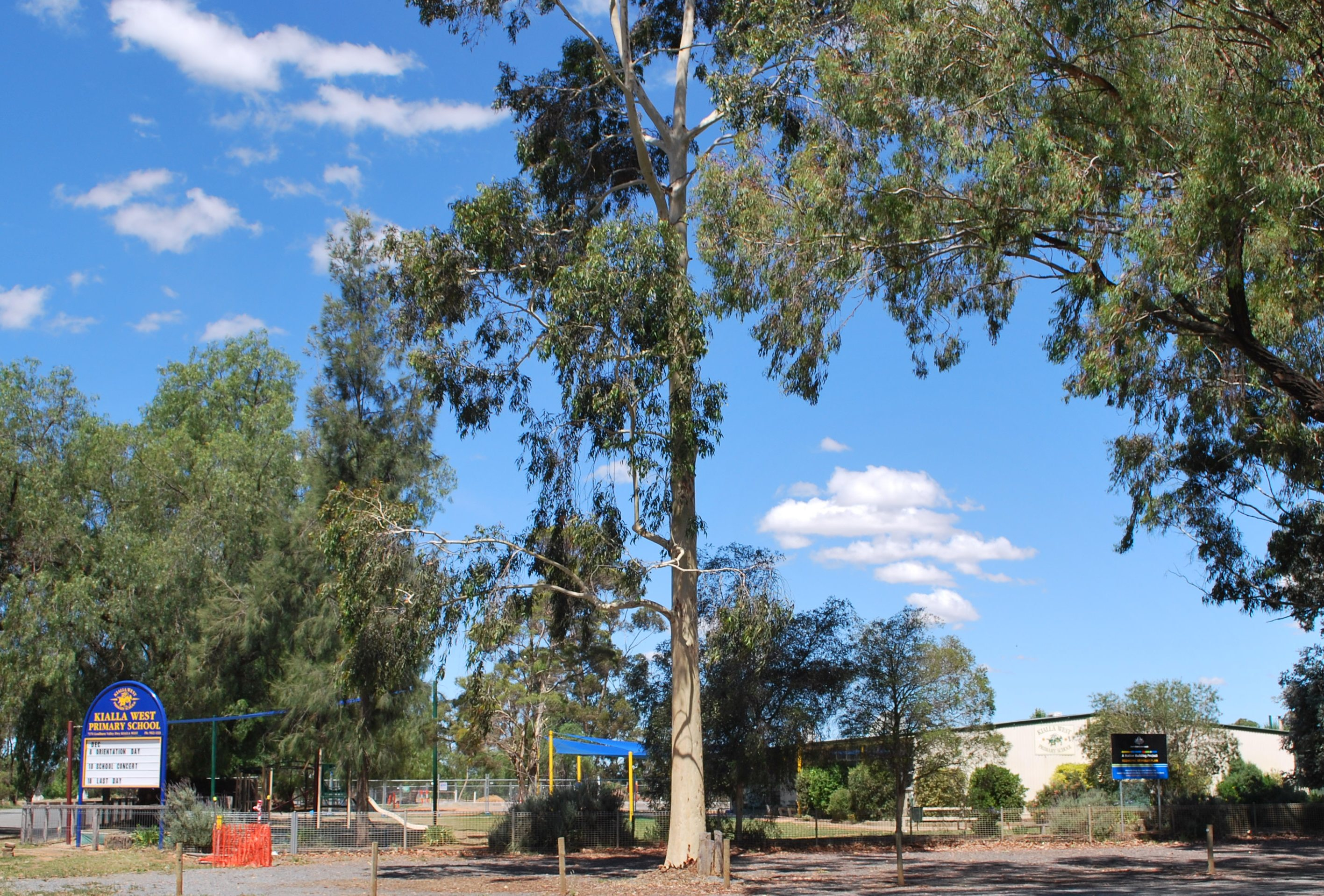
- Kialla West Primary School, 2011

- Interactive map of Kialla West
- Coordinates: 36°27′54″S 145°23′19″E
- Country: Australia
- State: Victoria
- Region: Hume
- LGA: City of Greater Shepparton

Government
  - State electorate: Shepparton
  - Federal division: Nicholls

Population
  - Total: 431 (2016 census)
- Postcode: 3631

Kialla West is a town in Victoria, Australia. It is located in the City of Greater Shepparton. At the 2011 census, Kialla West had a population of 431.
