= Shepparton East =

- Suburb
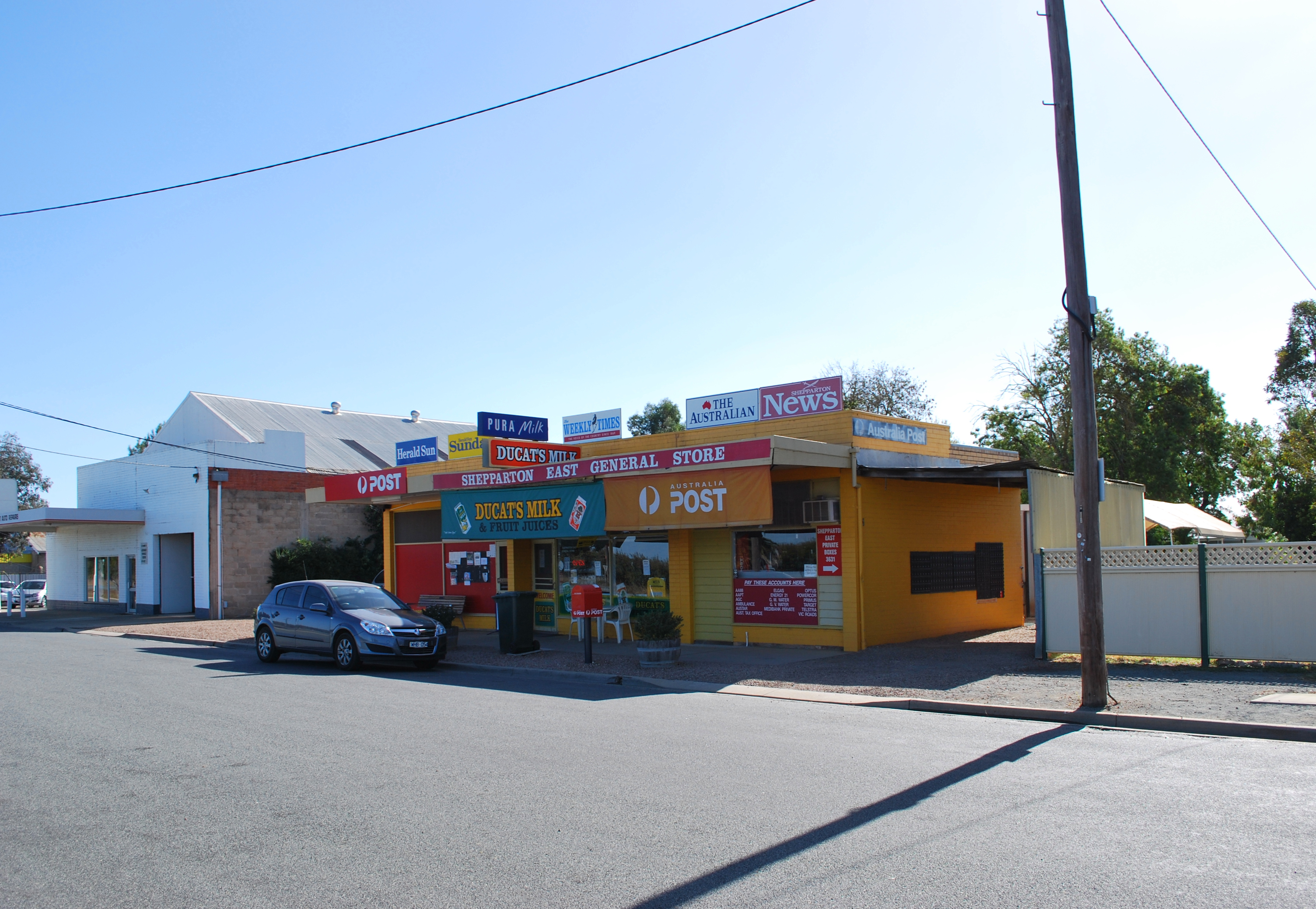
- General store at Shepparton East

- Interactive map of Shepparton East
- Coordinates: 36°23′17″S 145°27′43″E
- Country: Australia
- State: Victoria
- Region: Hume
- City: Shepparton
- LGA: City of Greater Shepparton

Government
  - State electorate: Shepparton
  - Federal division: Nicholls

Population
  - Total: 1,171 (2011 census)
- Postcode: 3631

Shepparton East is a town in Victoria, Australia. It is located in the City of Greater Shepparton. At the 2011 census, Shepparton East had a population of 1,171.
