= Bunbartha =

- Town
- Coordinates: 36°12′28″S 145°19′54″E
- Country: Australia
- State: Victoria
- Region: Hume
- LGA: City of Greater Shepparton

Government
  - State electorate: Shepparton
  - Federal division: Nicholls

Population
  - Total: 313 (2021 census)
- Postcode: 3617

Bunbartha is a locality in Victoria, Australia. It is located in the City of Greater Shepparton. At the 2021 census, Bunbartha had a population of 313.

== Bunbartha Football Club ==
Bunbartha FC played in the Goulburn Valley Football Association in 1910 and 1911 and between 1919 and 1921.
