= Pine Lodge =

- Town
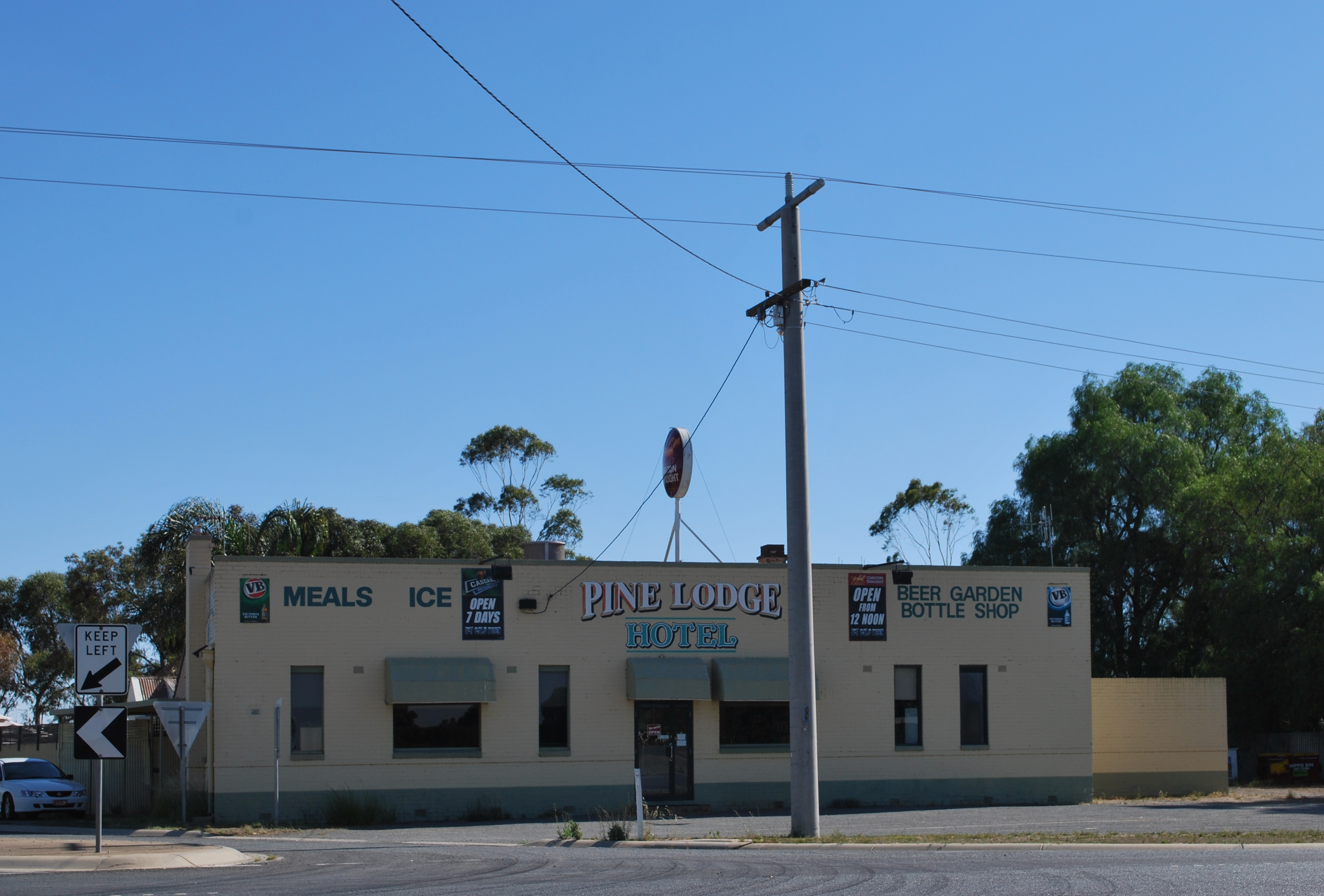
- Pine Lodge Hotel, 2009

- Coordinates: 36°21′15″S 145°31′53″E
- Country: Australia
- State: Victoria
- Region: Hume
- LGA: City of Greater Shepparton

Government
  - State electorate: Shepparton
  - Federal division: Nicholls

Population
  - Total: 241 (2016 census)
- Postcode: 3631

Pine Lodge is a town in Victoria, Australia. It is located in the City of Greater Shepparton. At the 2016 census, Pine Lodge had a population of 241.
