= Harston, Victoria =

Harston
- Town
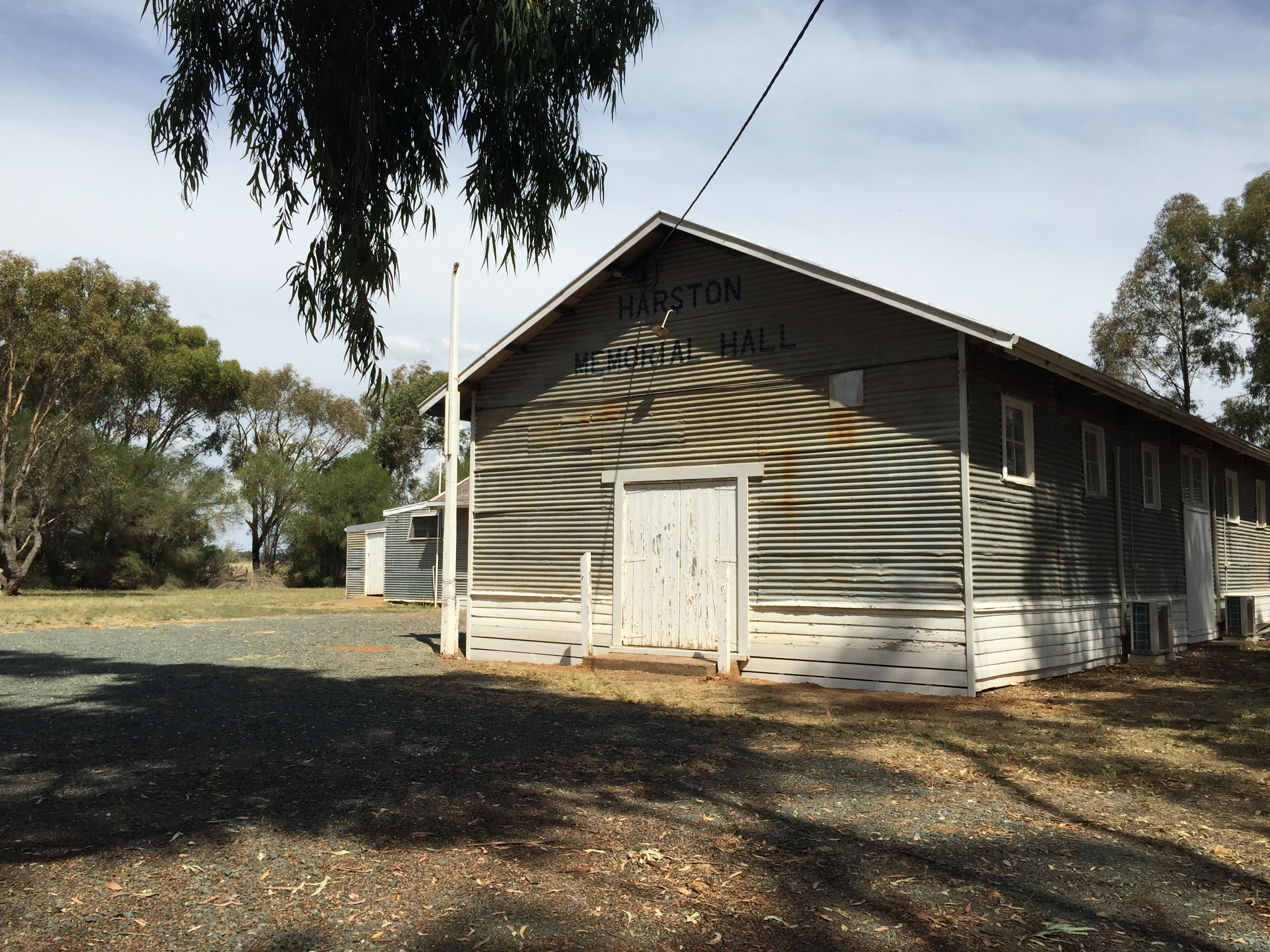
- Memorial Hall

- Coordinates: 36°28′10″S 145°9′32″E
- Country: Australia
- State: Victoria
- Region: Hume
- LGA: City of Greater Shepparton

Government
  - State electorate: Euroa
  - Federal division: Nicholls

Population
  - Total: 167 (2021 census)
- Postcode: 3616

Harston is a locality in Victoria, Australia. It is located in the City of Greater Shepparton. At the 2021 census, Harston had a population of 167.
