= Grahamvale =

- Town
- Interactive map of Grahamvale
- Coordinates: 36°21′S 145°26′E
- Country: Australia
- State: Victoria
- Region: Hume
- LGA: City of Greater Shepparton

Government
  - State electorate: Shepparton
  - Federal division: Nicholls

Population
  - Total: 685 (2021 census)
- Postcode: 3631

Grahamvale is a town in Victoria, Australia that encompasses the outer-most eastern regions of the city of Shepparton. At the 2021 census, Grahamvale had a population of 685.

The region includes a mix of industrial, grazing and orchard land as well as several highly sought after housing estates. The most notable of these estates is Dobson Estate which comprises approximately 200 residences spread over approximately 300 acres (121 hectares or 4056 sq. metres).

The Grahamvale region is bounded by Ford Road, Central Avenue, Old Dookie Road and the non distinct boundary of Shepparton. It is primarily a designation applied by the post office to define this area as something different from the Shepparton township. The Post Code for the region is 3631, as compared to Shepparton's 3630, although there is now no 'Grahamvale' post office. (A post office, Grahamvale State School, opened on 1 July 1912 was renamed Grahamvale around 1920 and closed in 1979).

There is a Primary School located on Grahamvale Rd called Grahamvale Primary School. The Grahamvale region is serviced by the Alternative Truck Route (Doyle's Road) and it is along this route within the area that many famous orchards are located. These orchards are abundant in pears, apricots, apples and peaches which are purchased predominantly by the SPC Ardmona company, which is based 2 km (1.2 mi) into Shepparton along Old Dookie Road.
