= City of Greater Shepparton =

- Local government area
- Location in Victoria

- Interactive map of City of Greater Shepparton
- Coordinates: 36°23′00″S 145°24′00″E
- Country: Australia
- State: Victoria
- Region: Hume
- Established: 1994
- Council seat: Shepparton

Government
  - Mayor: Shane Sali
  - State electorates: Euroa; Murray Plains; Shepparton
  - Federal division: Nicholls

Area
  - Total: 2,422 km^{2} (935 sq mi)

Population
  - Total: 68,409 (2021 census)
  - Density: 28.245/km^{2} (73.154/sq mi)
- Gazetted: 18 November 1994
- Website: City of Greater Shepparton
LGAs around City of Greater Shepparton
Moira	Moira	Moira
Campaspe	City of Greater Shepparton	Benalla
Campaspe	Strathbogie	Strathbogie

The City of Greater Shepparton is a local government area in the Hume region of Victoria, Australia, located in the north-east part of the state. It covers an area of 2,422 square kilometres (935 mi^{2}) and, in August 2021, had a population of 68,409. It includes the city of Shepparton and the towns of Arcadia, Ardmona, Congupna, Dookie, Grahamvale, Kialla, Lemnos, Merrigum, Mooroopna, Murchison, Tallygaroopna, Tatura, Toolamba and Undera.

The city is governed and administered by the Greater Shepparton City Council. Its seat of local government and administrative centre is located at the council headquarters in Shepparton; it also has a service centre located in Tatura. The city is named after the main urban settlement located in the centre of the LGA, that is Shepparton, which together with adjoining Mooroopna form the LGA's most populous urban area with a population of 51,903.

== History ==
The city was formed in 1994 from the amalgamation of the city of Shepparton, the Shire of Shepparton, the vast bulk of the Shire of Rodney, and parts of the Shire of Euroa, Shire of Goulburn, Shire of Tungamah, Shire of Violet Town and Shire of Waranga.

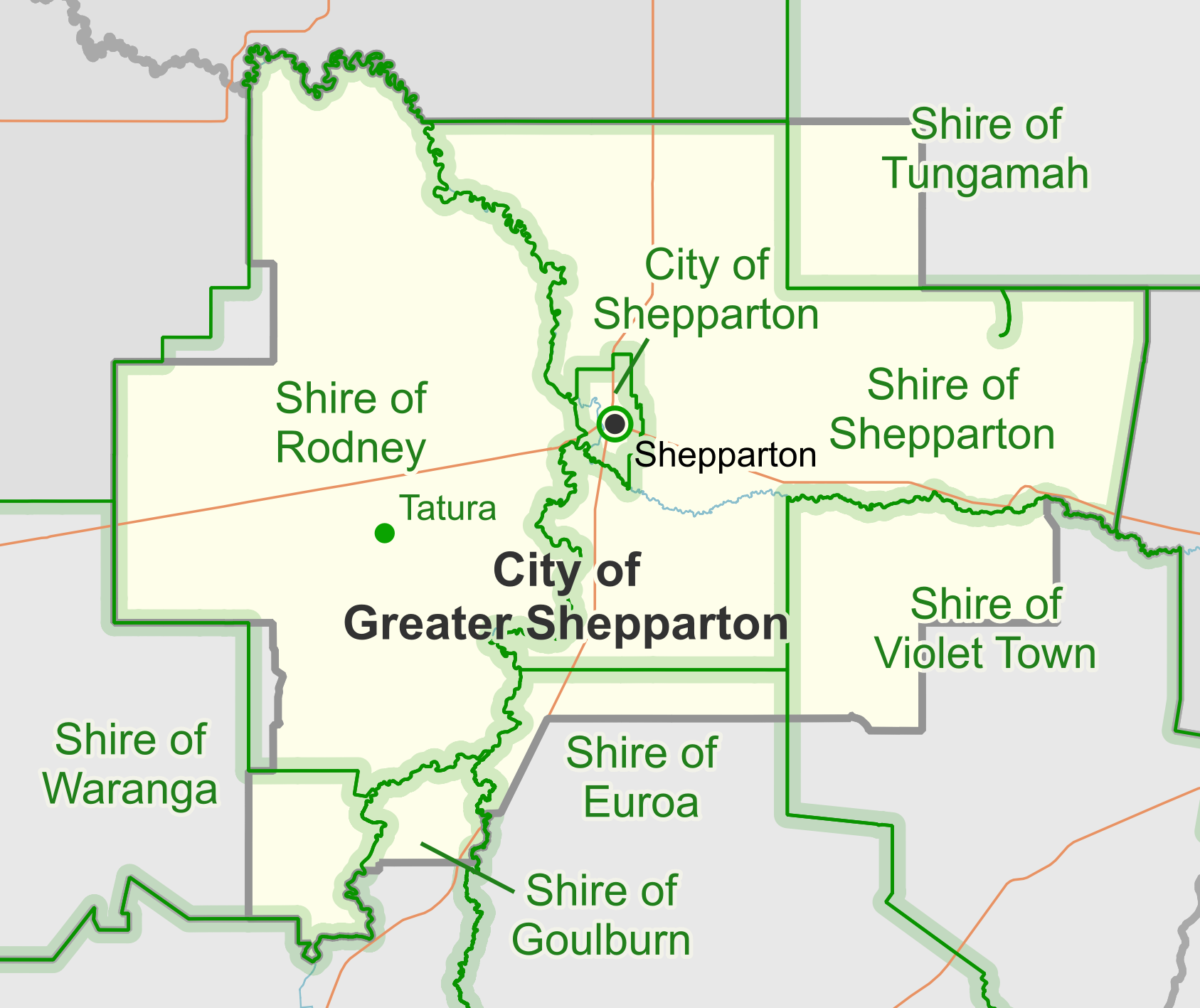
Greater Shepparton's predecessor LGAs (green) as they were in 1994. The administrative centres of the former LGAs are marked by green dots.

== Council ==
=== Current composition ===
The council is composed of nine councillors elected to represent an unsubdivided municipality. The last council election was in 2020. The elected councillors of Greater Shepparton in 2022 are:

Ward	Councillor	Notes
Unsubdivided	Shane Sali	Mayor
Unsubdivided	Anthony Brophy	
Unsubdivided	Seema Abdullah	
Unsubdivided	Geoff Dobson	
Unsubdivided	Greg James	
Unsubdivided	Ben Ladson	
Unsubdivided	Fern Summer	
Unsubdivided	Dinny Adem	
Unsubdivided	Sam Spinks	Deputy Mayor, Greens

=== Administration and governance ===
The council meets in the council chambers at the council headquarters in the Shepparton Municipal Offices, which is also the location of the council's administrative activities. It also provides customer services at both its administrative centre in Shepparton, and its service centre in Tatura.

== Townships and localities ==
In the 2021 census, the city had a population of 68,409, up from 63,837 in the 2016 census.

Population
Locality	2016	2021
Arcadia	217	212
Ardmona	487	497
Boxwood^	20	19
Bunbartha	276	313
Byrneside	158	161
Caniambo	74	82
Congupna	605	620
Cooma	108	94
Coomboona	131	134
Cosgrove	54	50
Cosgrove South	58	53
Dhurringile	445	369
Dookie	328	333
Dookie College	44	51
Gillieston	60	45
Girgarre East	121	143
Goulburn Weir^	82	90
Gowangardie	16	18
Grahamvale	682	685
Harston	174	167
Karramomus	37	40
Katandra	113	120
Katandra West	476	492
Kialla	6,817	8,667
Kialla East	137	170
Kialla West	431	415
Kyabram^	7,331	7,416
Kyabram South	80	69
Lancaster^	393	398
Lemnos	246	251
Major Plains^	37	36
Marionvale	91	116
Marungi^	111	98
Merrigum	679	679
Moorilim^	25	25
Mooroopna	7,942	8,312
Mooroopna North	123	144
Mooroopna North West	74	67
Mount Major	6	10
Murchison	925	884
Murchison East	135	140
Murchison North	187	185
Nalinga^	25	22
Orrvale	438	450
Pine Lodge	241	267
Shepparton	31,197	32,067
Shepparton East	1,138	1,192
Shepparton North	1,033	2,048
St Germains	75	75
Stanhope South	*	#
Stewarton^	116	118
Tallygaroopna	579	600
Tamleugh North	34	24
Tatura	4,669	4,955
Tatura East	143	135
Toolamba	769	822
Toolamba West	112	110
Undera	442	450
Violet Town^	874	936
Waranga	*	#
Wyuna^	262	278
Zeerust	149	147

^ – Territory divided with another LGA
* – Not noted in 2016 Census
# – Not noted in 2021 Census

== See also ==
- List of localities in Victoria
- List of places on the Victorian Heritage Register in the City of Greater Shepparton
