= Shire of Goulburn =

- Local government area
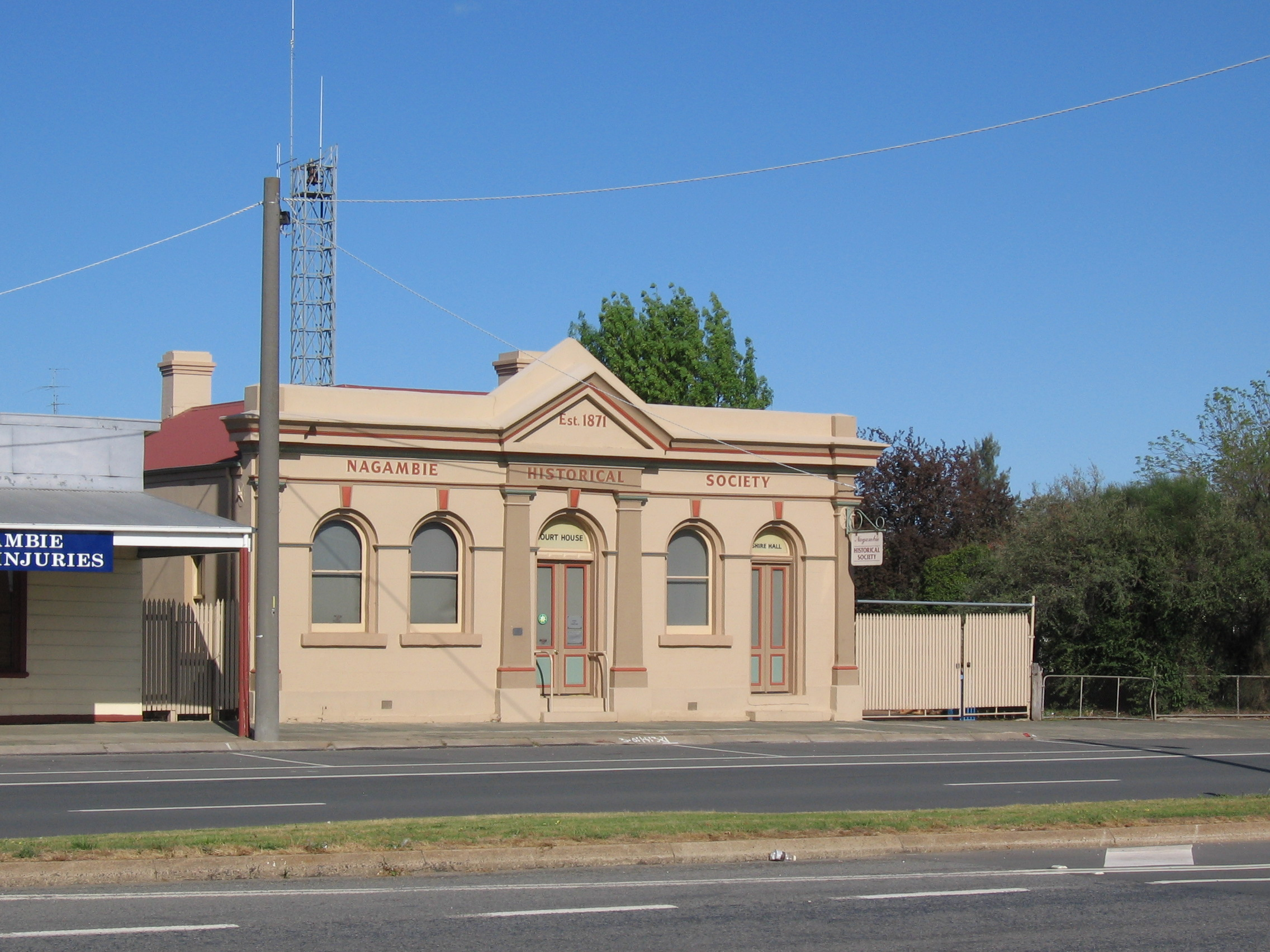
- Former Shire Hall and Courthouse in Nagambie
- The Shire of Goulburn as at its dissolution in 1994
- Country: Australia
- State: Victoria
- Established: 1868
- Council seat: Nagambie

Area
  - Total: 1,016 km^{2} (392 sq mi)

Population
  - Total(s): 2,680 (1992)
  - Density: 2.638/km^{2} (6.832/sq mi)
- County: Moira, Delatite, Rodney, Dalhousie
LGAs around Shire of Goulburn
Waranga	Rodney	Euroa
McIvor	Shire of Goulburn	Euroa
McIvor	Seymour	Yea

The Shire of Goulburn was a local government area about 120 kilometres (75 mi) north of Melbourne, the state capital of Victoria, Australia. The shire covered an area of 1,016 square kilometres (392.3 sq mi), and existed from 1868 until 1994.

== History ==
Goulburn was first incorporated as a road district on 24 November 1868, and became a shire on 24 March 1871. On 16 May 1956, Goulburn annexed land from the Shire of Waranga.

On 18 November 1994, the Shire of Goulburn was abolished, and along with the Shires of Euroa and Violet Town, and some neighbouring districts, was merged into the newly created Shire of Strathbogie.

== Wards ==
The Shire of Goulburn was divided into three ridings on 16 May 1956, each of which elected three councillors:

- Central Riding
- East Riding
- North Riding

== Towns and localities ==
- Goulburn Weir
- Graytown
- Locksley
- Longwood
- Mitchellstown
- Moorilim
- Nagambie*
- Ruffy
- Tabilk
- Tarcombe
- Wahring

* Council seat.

== Population ==
Year	Population
1954	1,760
1958	2,200*
1961	1,900
1966	1,837
1971	2,004
1976	2,060
1981	2,113
1986	2,205
1991	2,535

* Estimate in the 1958 Victorian Year Book.
