= HM Prison Dhurringile =

Prison in Victoria, Australia

Coordinates: 36°31′15″S 145°13′41″E

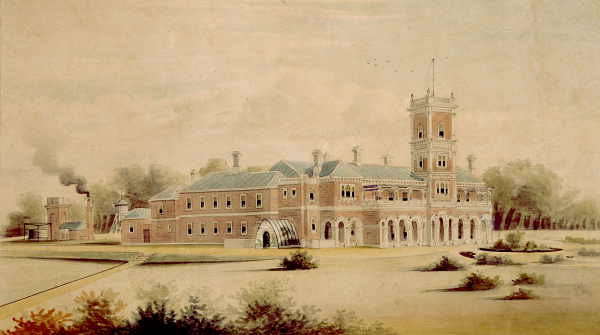
- Interactive map of HM Prison Dhurringile
- Location: Dhurringile, Victoria, Australia
- Status: closed
- Security class: Minimum security
- Capacity: 214
- Opened: 1965
- Closed: 2024
- Managed by: Corrections Victoria

HM Prison Dhurringile was a minimum security prison located in Dhurringile, Victoria, Australia. Situated 160 kilometres (99 mi) north of Melbourne near Murchison, it was based around the historic Dhurringile estate.

== Facilities ==
The Dhurringile mansion had not been used to house prisoners since 2007, when new buildings were opened. The main unit was called Kyabram and housed 54 prisoners in cell accommodations. The unit had two sides, South and North. South was the reception side, where all new arrivals were housed prior to being moved into cottage accommodation. The North side was for medical hold prisoners who needed to be located within the unit on a permanent basis.

The prison also contained cottages in both C1 and C2 classifications. The C1 cottages were: Merrigum (1, 2, and 3), Kyouga (1 and 2), Echuca (1, 2, and 3), Tatchera (1, 2, and 3), and Tallygaroopna (1 and 2). Each C1 cottage housed six prisoners, each with their own bedroom. There was a main lounge area with a TV and other amenities. The prisoners in these accommodations collected their meals from the main mess hall every day, as there were no cooking facilities located within the cottages. There were also three C1 self-catered units where cooking was done within the unit.

There were three main C2 units called Garnya (1, 2, and 3), Dhugalla (1, 2, and 3), and Benalla (1, 2, and 3); these units were fully self-catered. Each prisoner had their own bedroom, and there was a large kitchen and living area. The units had two bathrooms and two toilets. Food for these units was ordered off a grocery list, and the unit was allocated $275 per week to buy groceries. Prisoners from these units were not permitted to attend the mess hall for any meals.

There was a 12-bed unit called 'Wyuna' for long-term C2 prisoners nearing the end of their sentences. Selection was required to enter this unit; prisoners could not simply request placement. The unit was composed of bedrooms with en suites. Like any C2 unit, it was unlocked at night, but prisoners obtained their meals from the mess hall.

=== Upgrades ===
A new kitchen, medical, library, and administration building was opened in mid-2010. It was a state-of-the-art facility. Musters were then conducted on the balcony of this building instead of in the mansion, where they had previously been held. Most musters at the jail were held at the prisoners' units or by their doors if they were located in Kyabram. However, all work musters from Monday through Friday were held on this balcony.

A 54-bed expansion was opened by Andrew McIntosh, Minister for Corrections on 31 July 2012.

The prison continued to expand. In January 2014, 50 converted shipping containers were established on-site to house 100 prisoners. Other expansion works were underway in early 2014 to build more permanent accommodation for Victoria's growing prisoner population.

== Work ==
All prisoners were expected to work while located at the prison. There were a variety of work opportunities. The main two industries were wooden products and metal fabrication, where most prisoners were placed upon reception. Other areas of work included Horticulture (working in the main orchards), Maintenance, Gardening, or "Billet" (cleaner) jobs.

The prison was also a working dairy farm, with about 15 prisoners working in the dairy. This work involved being woken and let out of their units at 5:30 am to milk the cows. The dairy workers also milked again at about 4:00 pm. They worked a six-day week with one day off. Dairy workers had their own special canteen times, as they were working during the hours when other prisoners were able to attend the canteen and similar activities.

== History ==
HM Prison Dhurringile was established in 1965 when the Government of Victoria acquired the Dhurringile mansion and former estate from the Presbyterian Church of Australia, who had used the site for the then recently-defunct Dhurringile Rural Training Farm.

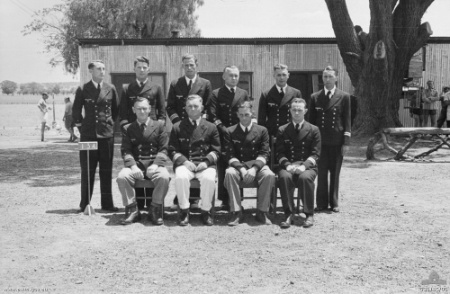
Kormoran senior officers at No. 13 POW Group, Dhurringile

=== WWII POW camp ===
The site had earlier operated as an internment camp and prisoner of war camp during World War II. Several POWs were from the German auxiliary cruiser Kormoran. Originally an internment camp for German and Italian persons, it then changed to an army POW camp, mostly for German military from the Middle East, with five compounds. The homestead itself was intended for commissioned officers.

There were a number of attempts and escapes. In September 1940 one escapee was apprehended in Shepparton, having previously attempted escape by hiding in a rubbish bin. On 11 January 1945, 20 German POWs made a break-out but where apprehended within twenty-four hours. At some time during the camp's life, two German captains also escaped from the officers camp.

== Escapes ==
On 15 February 2010, 36-year-old, convicted armed robber Jason Campbell, escaped from the prison.

On 20 September 2013, 35-year-old Eray Aslan escaped but was found on 1 October 2013 in a Footscray home.

On 1 August 2014, 28-year-old Vikramjit Singh escaped from the prison.

== Closure ==
Dhurringile Prison closed on 31 August 2024 following a significant reduction in demand for minimum-security beds. People in custody were transferred to other suitable prison locations as part of major reforms to Victoria's men’s prison system. Corrections Victoria committed to providing a range of supports for Dhurringile staff, including opportunities to transfer to roles at other prisons, within the Department of Justice and Community Safety (DJCS), or the broader Victorian Public Service

== See also ==
- List of Australian prisons
