= Congupna =

- Town
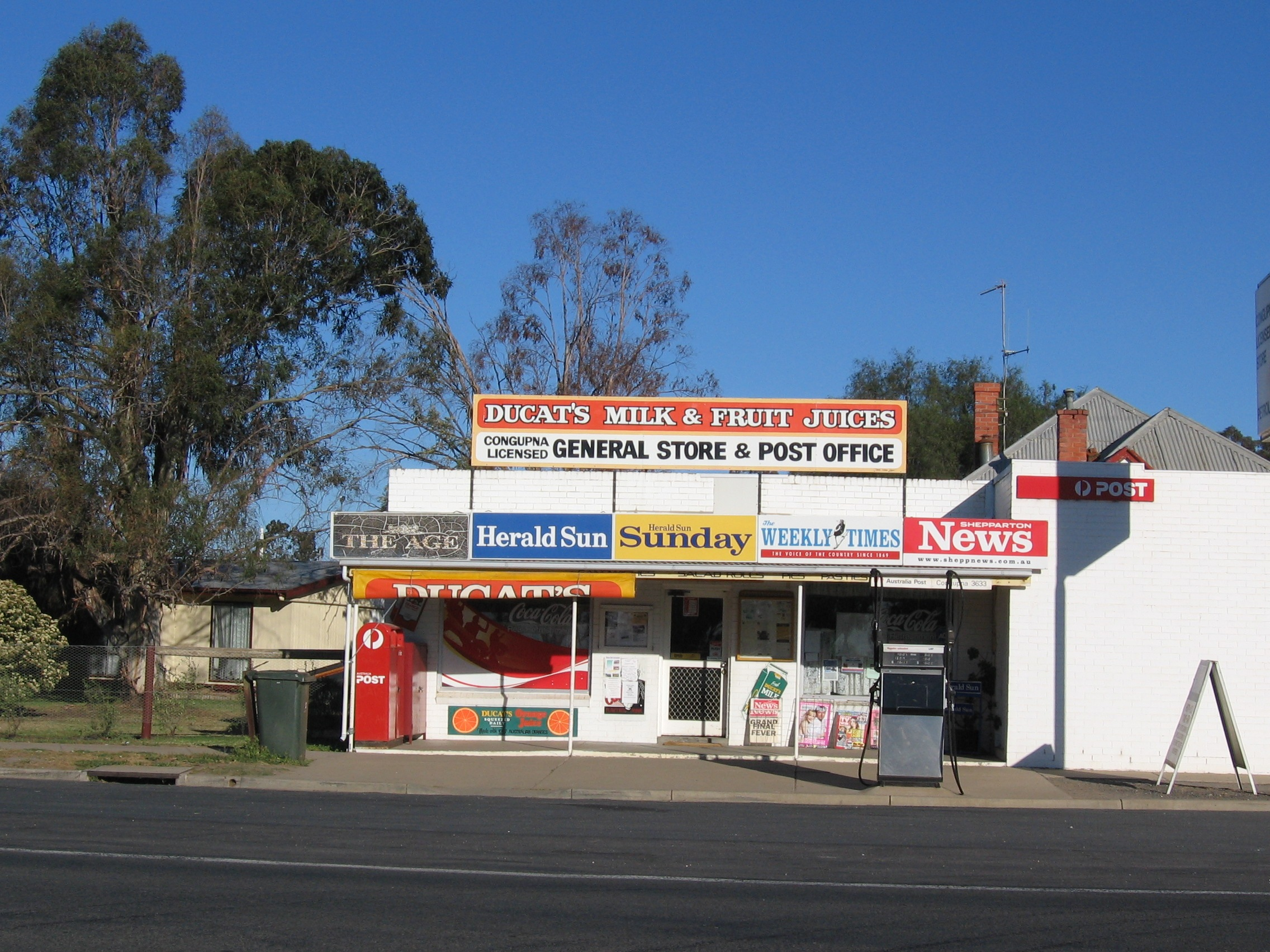
- Congupna general store and post office

- Interactive map of Congupna
- Coordinates: 36°18′S 145°26′E
- Country: Australia
- State: Victoria
- Region: Hume
- LGA: City of Greater Shepparton
- Location: 203 km (126 mi) N of Melbourne; 10 km (6.2 mi) N of Shepparton

Government
  - State electorate: Shepparton
  - Federal division: Nicholls

Population
  - Total: 620 (2021 census)
- Postcode: 3633

Congupna is a town in the Goulburn Valley region of Victoria, Australia. The town is in the City of Greater Shepparton local government area, 203 kilometres (126 mi) north of the state capital, Melbourne and 10 kilometres (6 mi) north of the regional centre of Shepparton. At the 2021 census, Congupna had a population of 620.

== History ==
Congupna, known also by the name Koongoopna, was first established about 8 km north of its present location.

Congupna Post Office opened there on 1 December 1881, was renamed Congupna Township around 1909 and closed in 1953. Congupna Road Post Office opened on 17 October 1881 shortly after the railway station of the same name. These were both renamed Congupna in 1968.

== Today ==
Congupna Football Club play Australian rules football in the Murray Football League. Former Congupna Player Damian Drum went on to play several games 50+ with Geelong in the Australian Football League (AFL). After retiring as a player he went on to coach the Fremantle in the AFL. He is now the representative for the seat of Nicholls in the Australian House of Representatives since the 2016 federal election as a member of The Nationals. Collingwood champion footballer Steele Sidebottom also hails from Congupna.

== See also ==
- Congupna Football Club
- Congupna railway station, Victoria
