= Shepparton North =

- Suburb
- Interactive map of Shepparton North
- Coordinates: 36°20′31″S 145°24′7″E
- Country: Australia
- State: Victoria
- Region: Hume
- City: Shepparton
- LGA: City of Greater Shepparton

Government
  - State electorate: Shepparton
  - Federal division: Nicholls

Population
  - Total: 1,033 (2016 census)
- Postcode: 3631

Shepparton North is a small district in Victoria, Australia. It is located in the City of Greater Shepparton. At the 2016 census, Shepparton North had a population of 1,033.
