= Dhurringile, Victoria =

Dhurringile
- Town
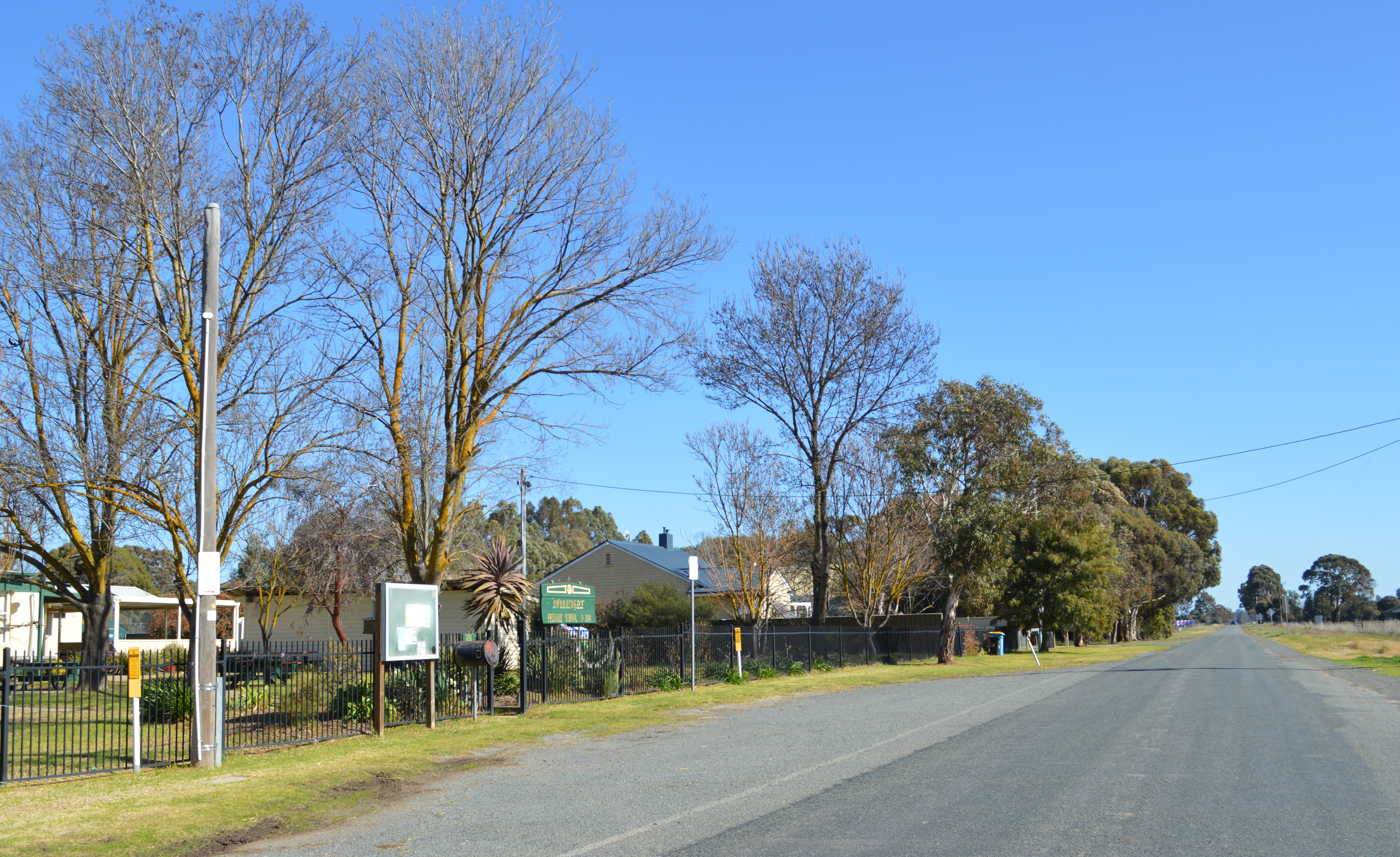
- Langham Road, with the primary school and community centre on the left

- Coordinates: 36°32′34″S 145°13′21″E
- Country: Australia
- State: Victoria
- Region: Hume
- LGA: City of Greater Shepparton

Government
  - State electorate: Euroa
  - Federal division: Nicholls

Population
  - Total: 369 (2021 census)
- Postcode: 3610

Dhurringile is a locality in Victoria, Australia, located 10 km north of Murchison and approximately the same distance east of the Waranga Basin reservoir. It is located in the City of Greater Shepparton. At the 2021 census, Dhurringile had a population of 369.

The historic Dhurringile mansion (now part of HM Prison Dhurringile) is located in the town. Dhurringile was the name of a 65 room mansion built in 1875 by James Winter, a wealthy squatter. The name is thought to have an Aboriginal origin meaning emu’s back, which the hill on which the mansion is built is said to resemble.

The town has a small primary school. In 2023 just three students were enrolled.
