= Moorilim =

- Town
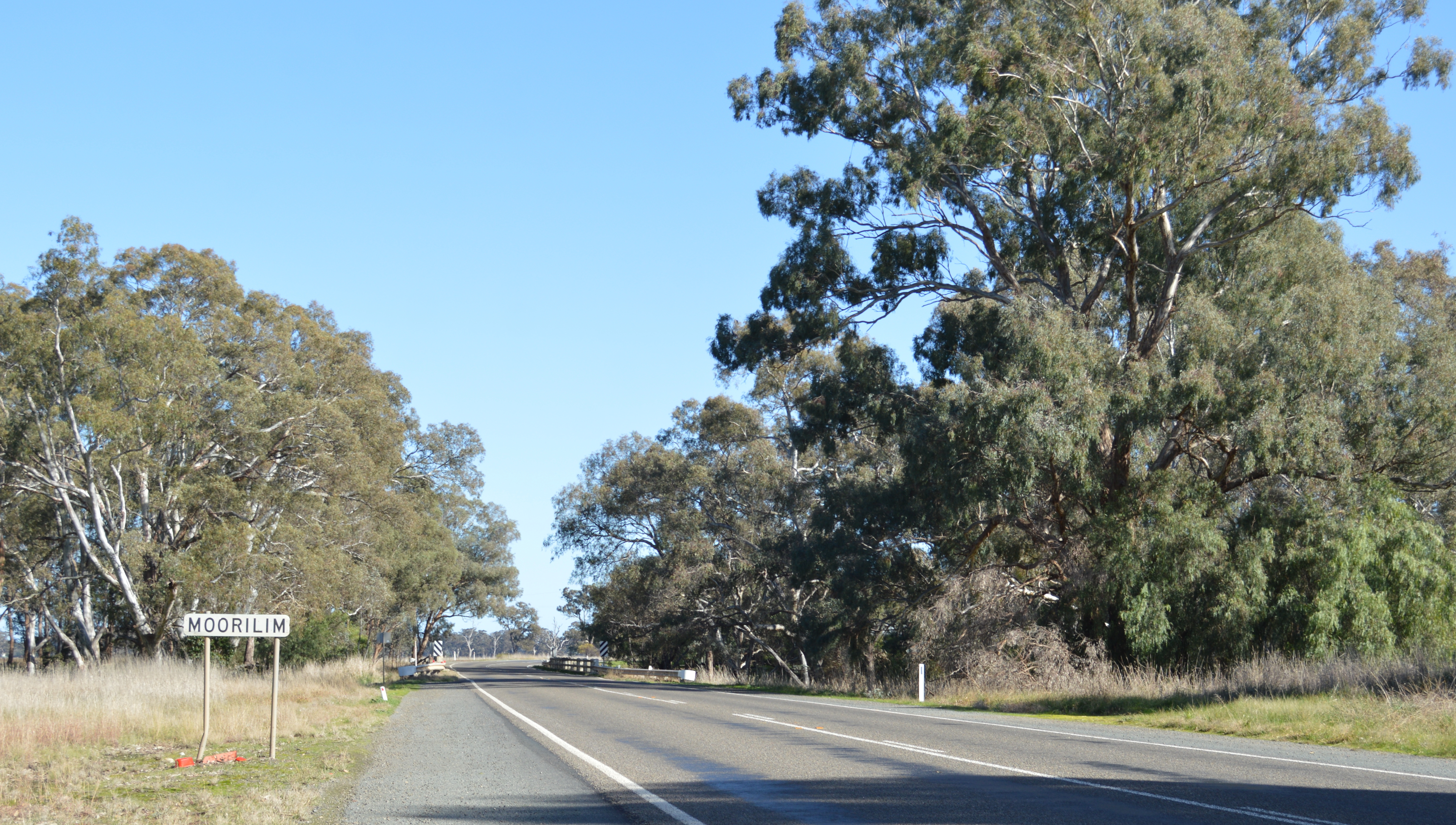
- Entering Moorilim

- Coordinates: 36°36′49″S 145°18′10″E
- Country: Australia
- State: Victoria
- Region: Hume
- LGAs: City of Greater Shepparton; Shire of Strathbogie
- Location: 214 km (133 mi) NE of Melbourne; 19 km (12 mi) S of Shepparton; 8 km (5.0 mi) E of Shepparton

Government
  - State electorate: Euroa
  - Federal division: Nicholls

Population
  - Total: 25 (2016 census)
- Postcode: 3610

Moorilim is a locality in northern Victoria, Australia. The locality is in the City of Greater Shepparton local government area, 164 kilometres (102 mi) north of the state capital, Melbourne.

At the 2016 census, Moorilim had a population of 25.
