= Karramomus =

- Town
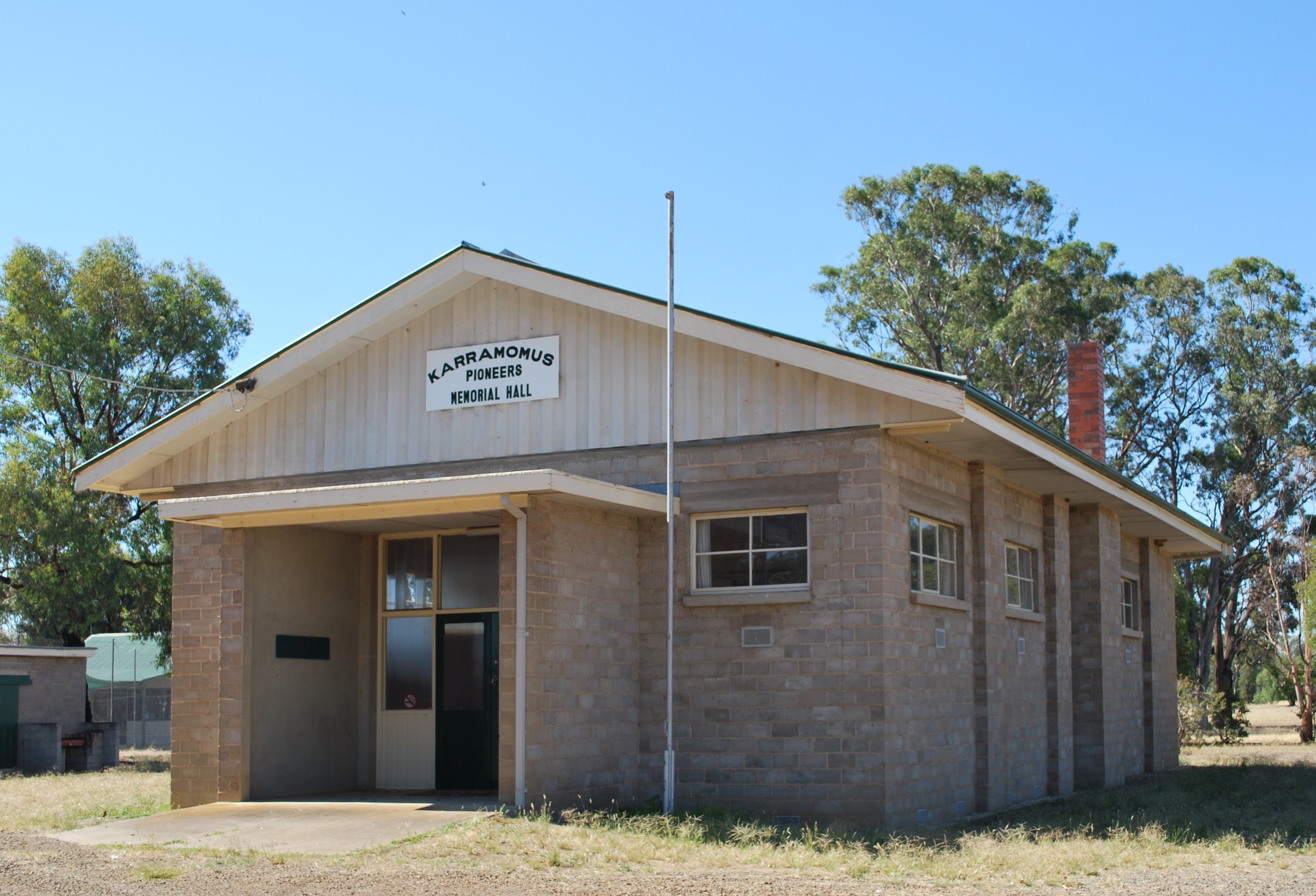
- Karramomus Pioneer Memorial Hall

- Coordinates: 36°32′S 145°28′E
- Country: Australia
- State: Victoria
- Region: Hume
- LGA: City of Greater Shepparton
- Location: 184 km (114 mi) N of Melbourne; 21 km (13 mi) S of Shepparton

Government
  - State electorate: Macedon
  - Federal division: Nicholls

Population
  - Total: 40 (2021 census)
- Postcode: 3631

Karramomus is a locality in the Goulburn Valley region of Victoria, Australia. The locality is in the City of Greater Shepparton local government area, 130 kilometres (81 mi) north west of the state capital, Melbourne.

At the 2021 census, Karramomus had a population of 40.

The Karramomus FC was established in 1878 and had only one loss in its first nine years.

In 1886, Karramomus FC won the Euroa Challenge Cup: W. H. Haley Trophy. Esq, J.P. (Seven Creeks Estate)

In 1911, Violet Town: 3.12 - 30 defeated Karramomos: 2.9 - 21 in the Violet Town Football Association (J D Nicholls Cup, Farmer's Arm Hotel) Grand Final.
