= Murchison East, Victoria =

Murchison East
- Town
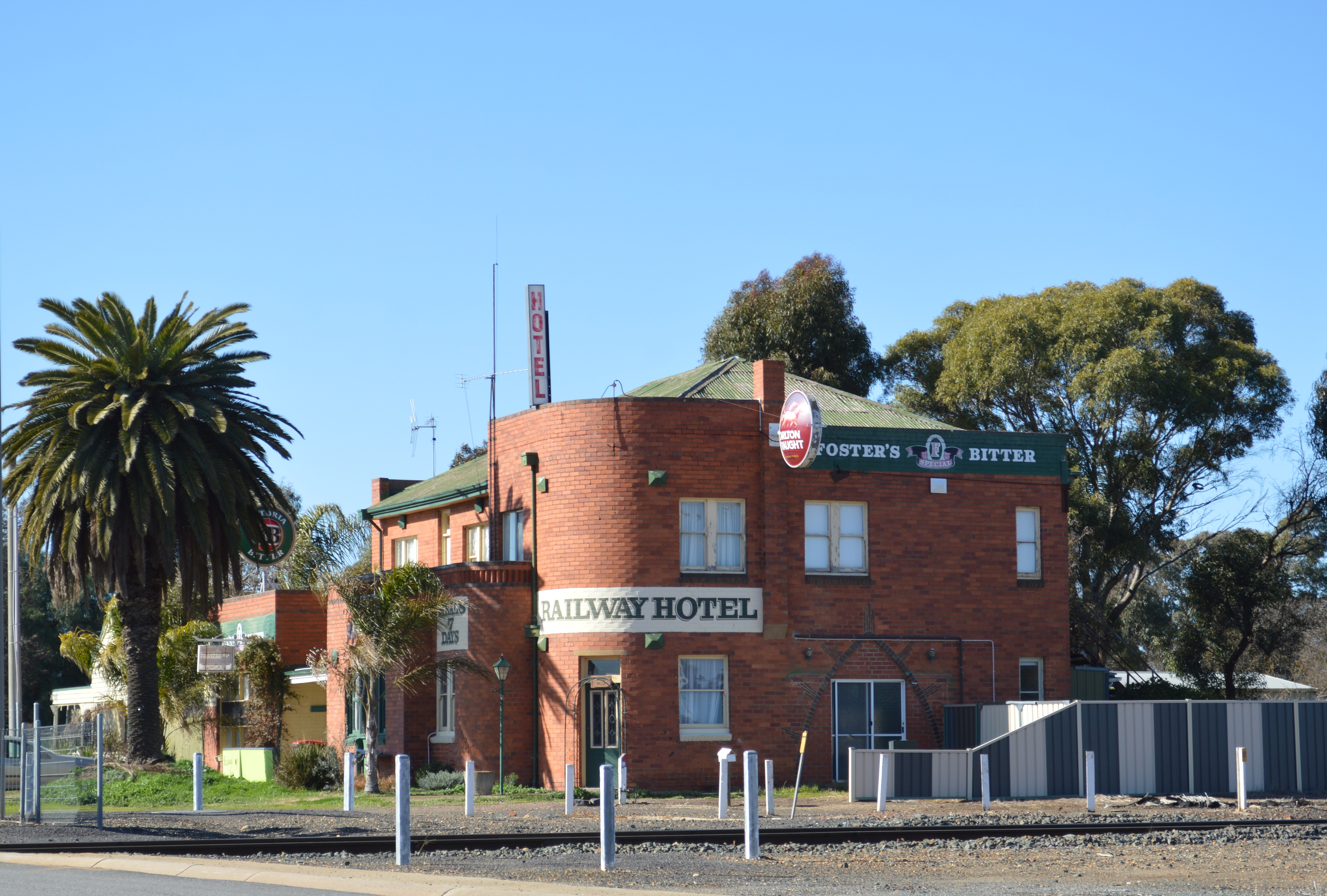
- Railway Hotel at Murchison East, 2017

- Coordinates: 36°36′55″S 145°14′25″E
- Country: Australia
- State: Victoria
- Region: Hume
- LGA: City of Greater Shepparton

Government
  - State electorate: Euroa
  - Federal division: Nicholls

Population
  - Total: 135 (2011 census)
- Postcode: 3610

Murchison East is a town in Victoria, Australia. It is located in the City of Greater Shepparton. At the 2016 census, Murchison East had a population of 135.
