= Gladys Nicholls =

Australian Aboriginal activist (1906–1981)

- Born: Gladys Naby Muriel Bux; 21 October 1906; Cummeragunja Reserve, New South Wales, Australia
- Died: 28 January 1981 (aged 74); Melbourne, Victoria, Australia
- Other names: Gladys, Lady Nicholls
- Spouses: Herbert Nicholls (m. 1927; died 1942) Douglas Nicholls (m. 1942)

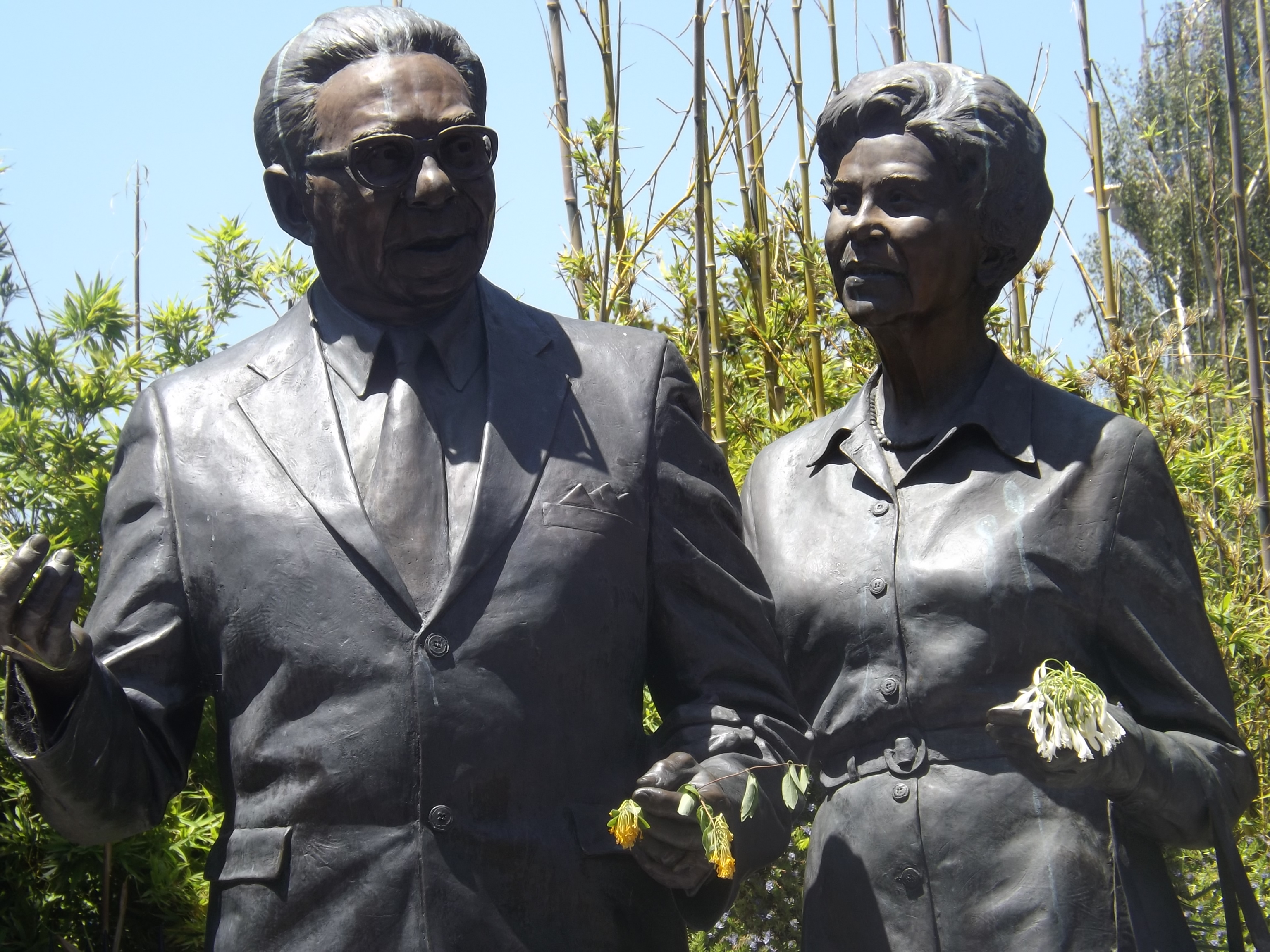
Pastor Sir Douglas and Lady Gladys Nicholls Memorial statue in Parliament Gardens, East Melbourne, Victoria

Gladys Naby Muriel Nicholls, Lady Nicholls (née Bux; 21 October 1906 – 28 January 1981) was an Aboriginal-Indian activist, who made significant contributions to developing support networks and improving conditions for the urban Aboriginal community in Melbourne, Victoria and across Australia, from the 1940s to the 1970s.

She was born Gladys Bux at Cummeragunja Reserve in Yorta Yorta country, near Moama on the New South Wales side of the Murray River and the border with Victoria. Her mother, Alice Campbell, was a Djadjawurrung and Baraparapa woman, while her father, Meera Bux (Baksch), was a Punjabi Indian merchant who ran a general store in Barmah on the Victorian side of the Murray. Gladys attended school on the reserve, and worked in her father's store, then later as a dairy maid.

At the age of 20, she married Herbert "Dowie" Nicholls, whose family was also from Cummeragunja. In 1939, the couple moved to Barmah after many residents staged a mass walk-off from the reserve due to its authoritarian management and poor conditions. They then moved to Melbourne, where Gladys worked in a munitions factory. In 1942, Dowie died from head injuries sustained after he was hit by a car, leaving Gladys a widow with three children. Dowie's brother, Douglas Nicholls, an Australian rules footballer and pastor, supported the family, and married Gladys in December 1942.

After the end of World War II, Nicholls worked voluntarily to address rising poverty and social problems in the urban Aboriginal community in Melbourne. She taught in Sunday school, and founded a series of opportunity shops in Fitzroy, recognising the need for community fundraising due to the dearth of government support. In 1956, Nicholls opened and managed a hostel for Aboriginal girls in Northcote, which was originally named "Cummeragunja" after her birth place, but was later named the Lady Gladys Nicholls Hostel after Nicholls herself.

Nicholls was inducted onto the Victorian Honour Roll of Women in 2008.
