= Arcadia, Victoria =

Arcadia
- Town
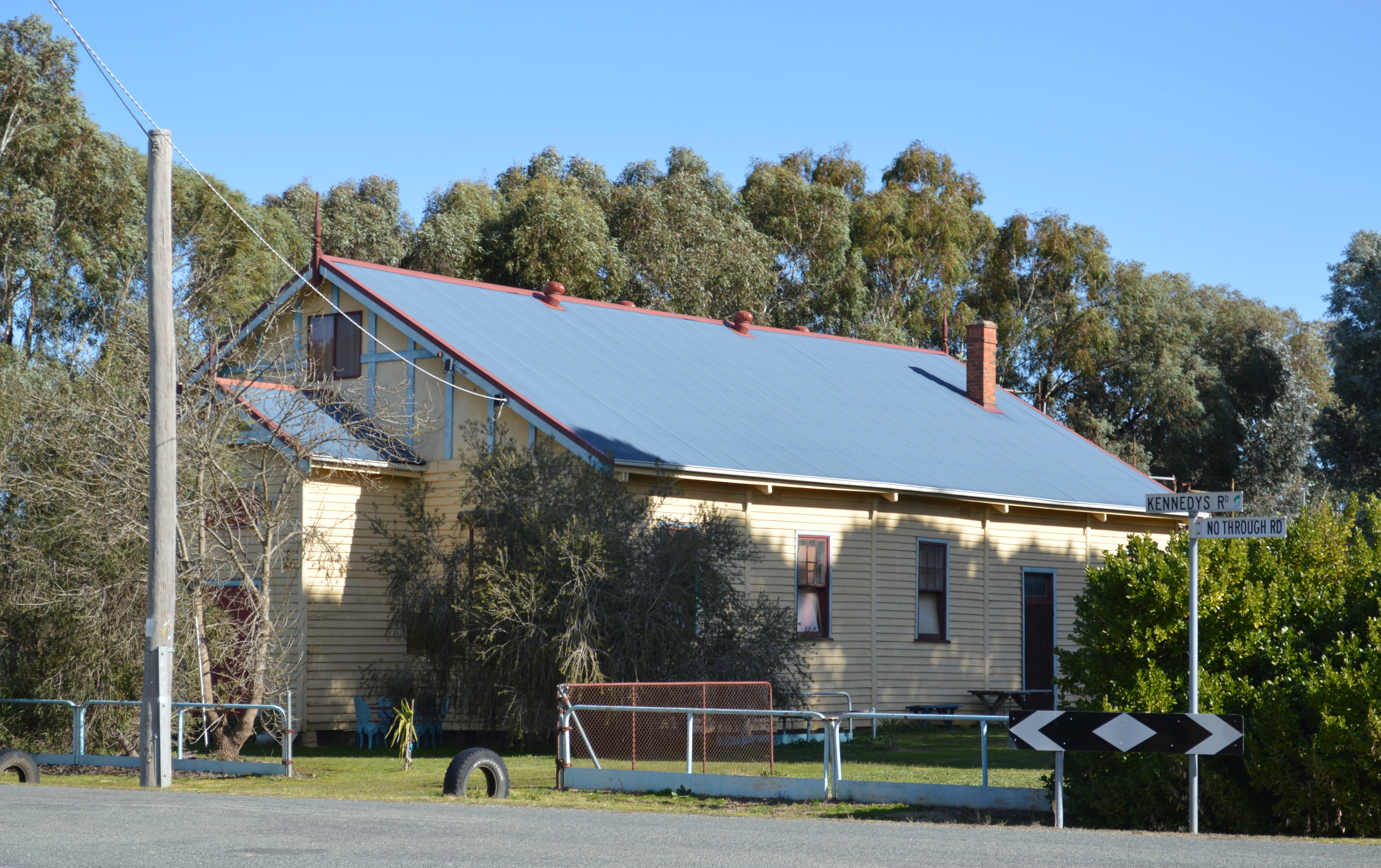
- Former public hall at Arcadia, now a private residence

- Coordinates: 36°34′S 145°20′E
- Country: Australia
- State: Victoria
- Region: Hume
- LGA: City of Greater Shepparton
- Location: 169 km (105 mi) N of Melbourne; 23 km (14 mi) S of Shepparton; 22 km (14 mi) NE of Murchison

Government
  - State electorate: Euroa
  - Federal division: Nicholls

Population
  - Total: 212 (2021 census)
- Postcode: 3631

Arcadia is a locality in Victoria, Australia. It is on Kennedys Road, in the City of Greater Shepparton, south of Shepparton. At the 2021 census, Arcadia had a population of 212.

The local railway station on the Goulburn Valley line opened on 13 January 1880 and closed on 30 June 1977.

The Post Office opened on 24 November 1873, being replaced by Arcadia Railway Station office, which was renamed Arcadia around 1902 and closed in 1993.
