= Kialla =

- Town
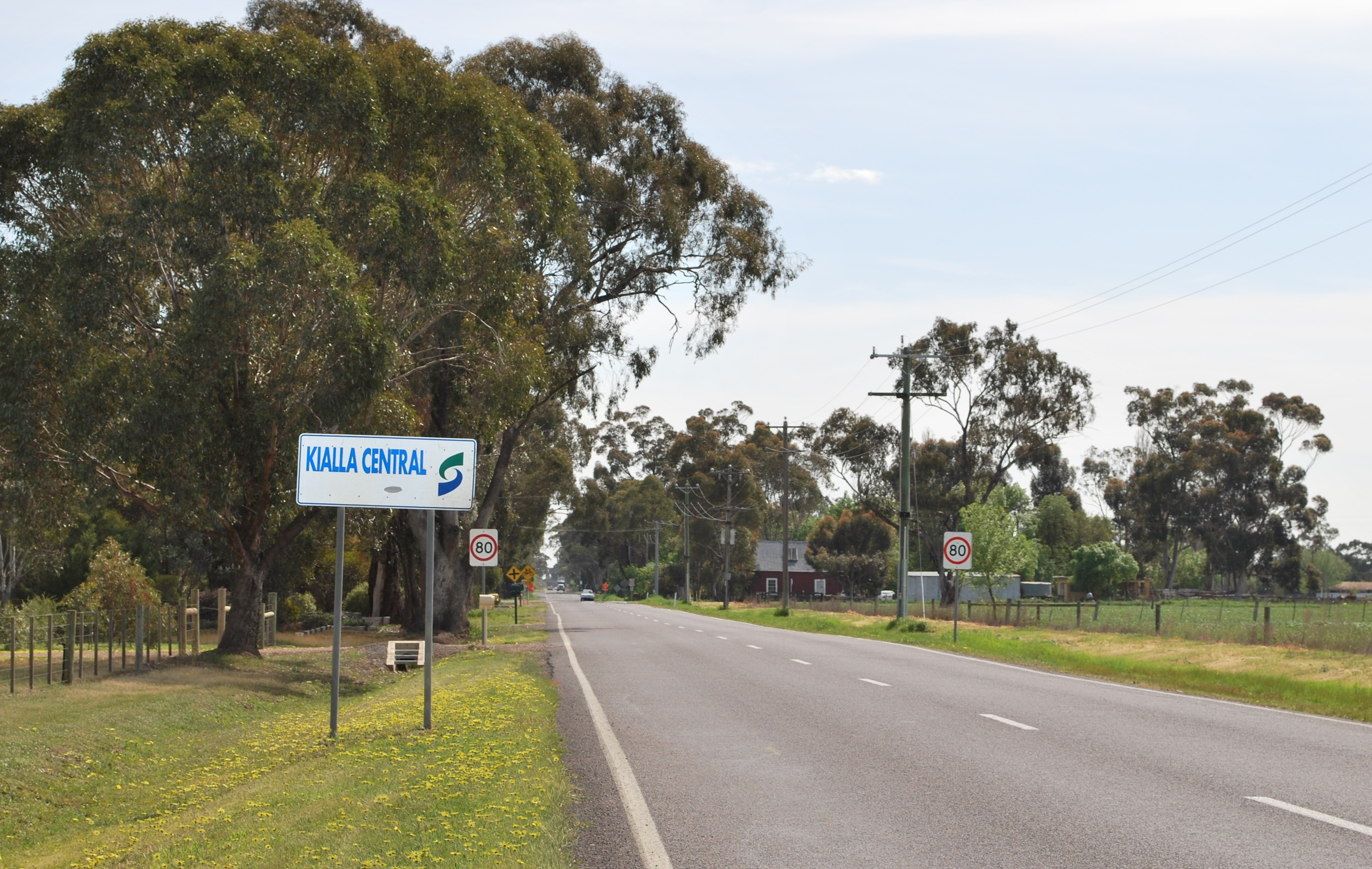
- Entering Central Kialla

- Interactive map of Kialla
- Coordinates: 36°27′S 145°25′E
- Country: Australia
- State: Victoria
- Region: Hume
- LGA: City of Greater Shepparton
- Location: 188 km (117 mi) N of Melbourne; 9 km (5.6 mi) S of Shepparton

Government
  - State electorate: Shepparton
  - Federal division: Nicholls

Population
  - Total: 6,817 (2016 census)
- Postcode: 3631

Kialla is a suburb within the City of Greater Shepparton local government area in the Goulburn Valley, Victoria, Australia. At the 2016 census, Kialla and surrounding area had a population of approximately 6,800.

Kialla includes the areas known as Kialla Central, Kialla West, Kialla Green and Kialla Lakes. Kialla Lakes is a major housing estate established in northern Kialla with three man-made lakes to provide scenery. Houses with lake frontage sell for a premium price.

== History ==
Kialla Post Office opened on 2 January 1874 and closed in 1918.

== Population ==
According to the 2016 census of population, there were 6,817 people in Kialla, of which:

- 1.6% were Aboriginals and/or Torres Strait Islanders
- 82.6% were born in Australia
- 82.9% spoke only English at home. Other languages spoken at home included Italian at 1.9%
- 28.0% were Catholic, 27.5% declared no religion, and 12.0% were Anglican

== Sport ==
Shepparton Harness Racing Club conducts regular meetings at its racetrack in Kialla.

The Shepparton Greyhound Racing Club holds regular greyhound racing meetings at its track on the Goulburn Valley Highway in Kialla. The track opened on 10 December 2005.

Golfers play at the Kialla Golf Club on Kialla Central Road.

== See also ==
- Shepparton
- Broken River (Victoria)
- Seven Creeks
- Goulburn River
