= Hume (region) =

Hume Region
- Region
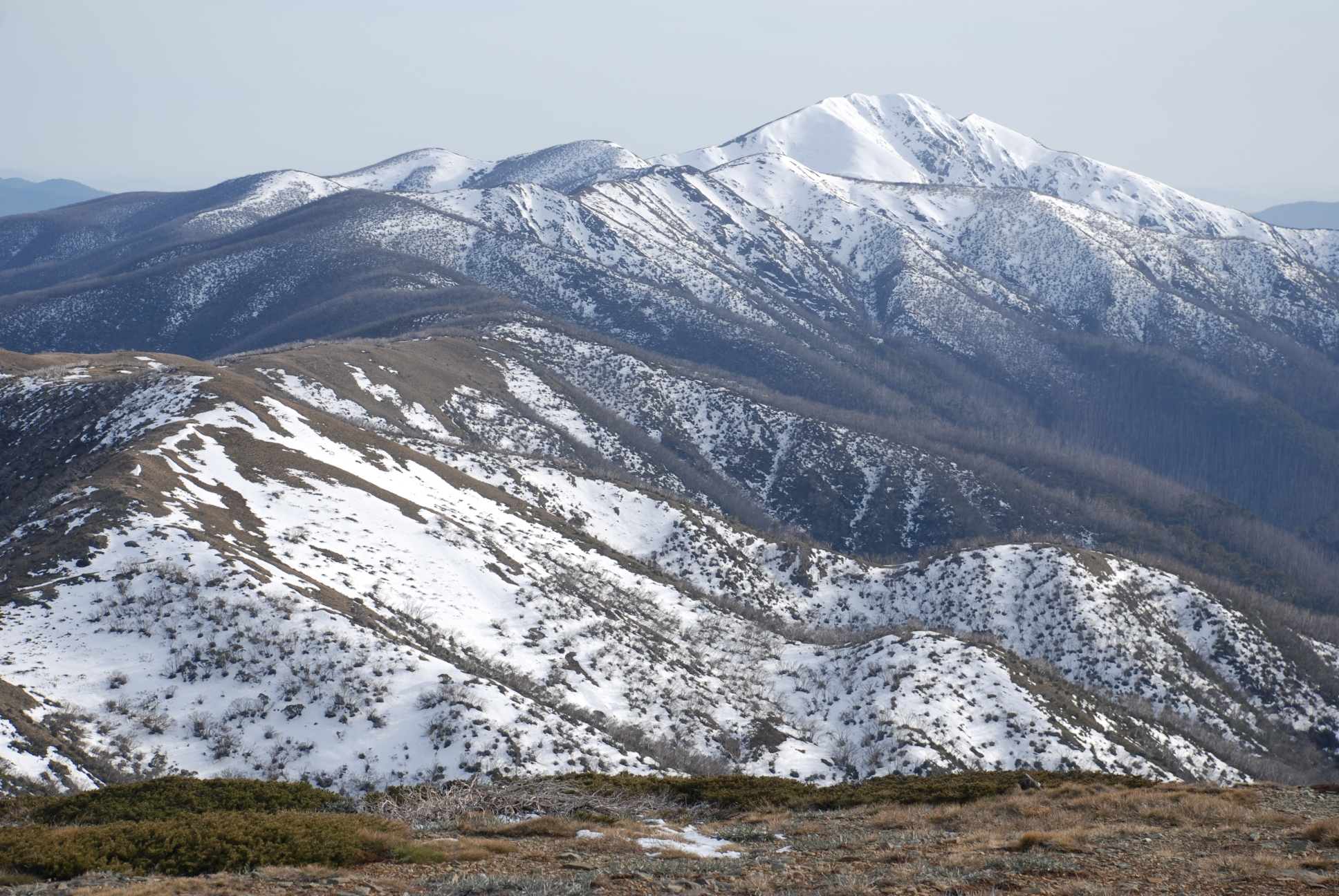
- Victorian Alps pictured in Spring 2007.

- Coordinates: 36°23′S 145°24′E
- Country: Australia
- State: Victoria
- LGA: (by population); Greater Shepparton; Wodonga; Mitchell; Moira; Wangaratta; Indigo; Benalla; Murrindindi; Alpine; Strathbogie; Mansfield; Towong

Government
  - State electorate: Benambra; Eildon; Euroa; Ovens Valley; Shepparton
  - Federal division: Bendigo; Indi; McEwen; Nicholls

Area (Note: Area figure is the combined population of all LGAs in the region)
  - Total: 40,381 km^{2} (15,591 sq mi)

Population
  - Total: 309,684 (2021 census) (Note: Population figure is the combined population of all LGAs in the region)
  - Density: 7.66905/km^{2} (19.86275/sq mi)
- Website: Hume Region
Regions around Hume Region
Loddon Mallee	New South Wales	New South Wales
Loddon Mallee	Hume Region	New South Wales
Loddon Mallee	Greater Melbourne	Gippsland

The Hume is an economic rural region located in the north-eastern part of Victoria, Australia. Comprising an area in excess of 40,000 square kilometres (15,000 sq mi) with a population that has grown from 263,000 (in 2011) to 309,684 (in 2021), the Hume region includes the local government areas of Alpine Shire, Rural City of Benalla, City of Wodonga, City of Greater Shepparton, Shire of Indigo, Shire of Mansfield, Shire of Strathbogie, Shire of Towong and the Rural City of Wangaratta, and also includes five unincorporated areas encompassing the alpine ski resorts in the region.

The Hume region is located along the two major interstate transport corridors – the Hume corridor and the Goulburn Valley corridor. The region comprises four distinct and inter-connected sub-regions or districts: Upper Hume, Central Hume, Goulburn Valley, and Lower Hume. The regional cities and centres of Wodonga, Shepparton and Wangaratta (supported by Benalla) function as a network of regional hubs that service their own distinct sub-regions. The region is bounded by the Victorian Alps in the south and east, the New South Wales border defined by the Murray River in the north, the Loddon Mallee region in the west and the Greater Melbourne northern, western, and eastern metropolitan and Gippsland regions to the south.

== Administration ==
=== Political representation ===
For the purposes of Australian federal elections for the House of Representatives, the Hume region is contained within all or part of the electoral divisions of Bendigo, Indi, McEwen, and Nicholls.

For the purposes of Victorian elections for the Legislative Assembly, the Hume region is contained within all or part of the electoral districts of Benambra, Eildon, Euroa, Kalkallo, Ovens Valley, Shepparton and Yan Yean.

==== Local government areas ====
The region contains twelve local government areas and five unincorporated areas of Victoria, which are:

Hume region LGA populations
Local government area	Area		Population (2016 census)	Source(s)	Population (2021 census)	Source(s)
Local government area	km^{2}	sq mi	Population (2016 census)	Source(s)	Population (2021 census)	Source(s)
Alpine Shire	4,787	1,848	12,337		13,235	
Rural City of Benalla	2,345	905	13,861		14,528	
Shire of Indigo	2,044	789	15,952		17,368	
Shire of Mansfield	3,843	1,484	8,584		10,178	
Shire of Mitchell	2,864	1,106	40,918		49,460	
Shire of Moira	4,045	1,562	29,112		30,522	
Shire of Murrindindi	3,889	1,502	13,732		15,197	
City of Greater Shepparton	2,422	935	63,837		68,409	
Shire of Strathbogie	3,302	1,275	10,274		11,455	
Shire of Towong	6,673	2,576	5,985		6,223	
Rural City of Wangaratta	3,639	1,405	28,310		29,808	
City of Wodonga	433	167	39,351		43,253	
Totals	40,286	15,555	282,253		309,363	

Hume region unincorporated areas populations
Unincorporated area	Area		Population (2021 census)	Source(s)
Unincorporated area	km^{2}	sq mi	Population (2021 census)	Source(s)
Falls Creek Alpine Resort	15.5	6.0	321	
Lake Mountain Alpine Resort	unknown		Nil	
Mount Buller Alpine Resort	22.6	8.7	Nil	
Hotham Alpine Resort	29.1	11.2	Nil	
Mount Stirling Alpine Resort	28.2	10.9	Nil	
Totals	95.4	36.8	321	

Hume region total populations
LGAs and Unincorporated areas	Area		Population (2021 census)
LGAs and Unincorporated areas	km^{2}	sq mi	Population (2021 census)
Total local government areas	40,286	15,555	309,363
Total unincorporated areas	95.4	36.8	321
Totals	40,381	15,591	309,684

=== Environmental protection ===
The Hume region contains many protected areas such as Barmah, Burrowa-Pine Mountain and Chiltern-Mt Pilot national parks; and the Winton Wetlands restoration site.

== See also ==
- Geography of Victoria
- Regions of Victoria
