= Division of Nicholls =

Australian federal electoral division

Nicholls Australian House of Representatives Division
- Interactive map of electorate boundaries from the 2025 federal election
- Created: 2019
- MP: Sam Birrell
- Party: Nationals
- Namesake: Sir Douglas Nicholls; Lady Gladys Nicholls
- Electors: 121,472 (2025)
- Area: 14,116 km^{2} (5,450.2 sq mi)
- Demographic: Rural
Electorates around Nicholls:
Indi	Indi	Indi
Mallee	Nicholls	Indi
Bendigo	McEwen	Indi

The Division of Nicholls is an Australian Electoral Division in the state of Victoria, which was contested for the first time at the 2019 federal election. Nicholls is in northern Victoria and was formerly known as the Division of Murray.

== Geography ==
Federal electoral division boundaries in Australia are determined at redistributions by a redistribution committee appointed by the Australian Electoral Commission. Redistributions occur for the boundaries of divisions in a particular state, and they occur every seven years, or sooner if a state's representation entitlement changes or when divisions of a state are malapportioned.

Nicholls is located in the north of the state, adjoining the Murray River, which forms Victoria's border with New South Wales and includes the towns of Shepparton, Yarrawonga, Seymour, Echuca, Broadford and Kilmore.

== History ==
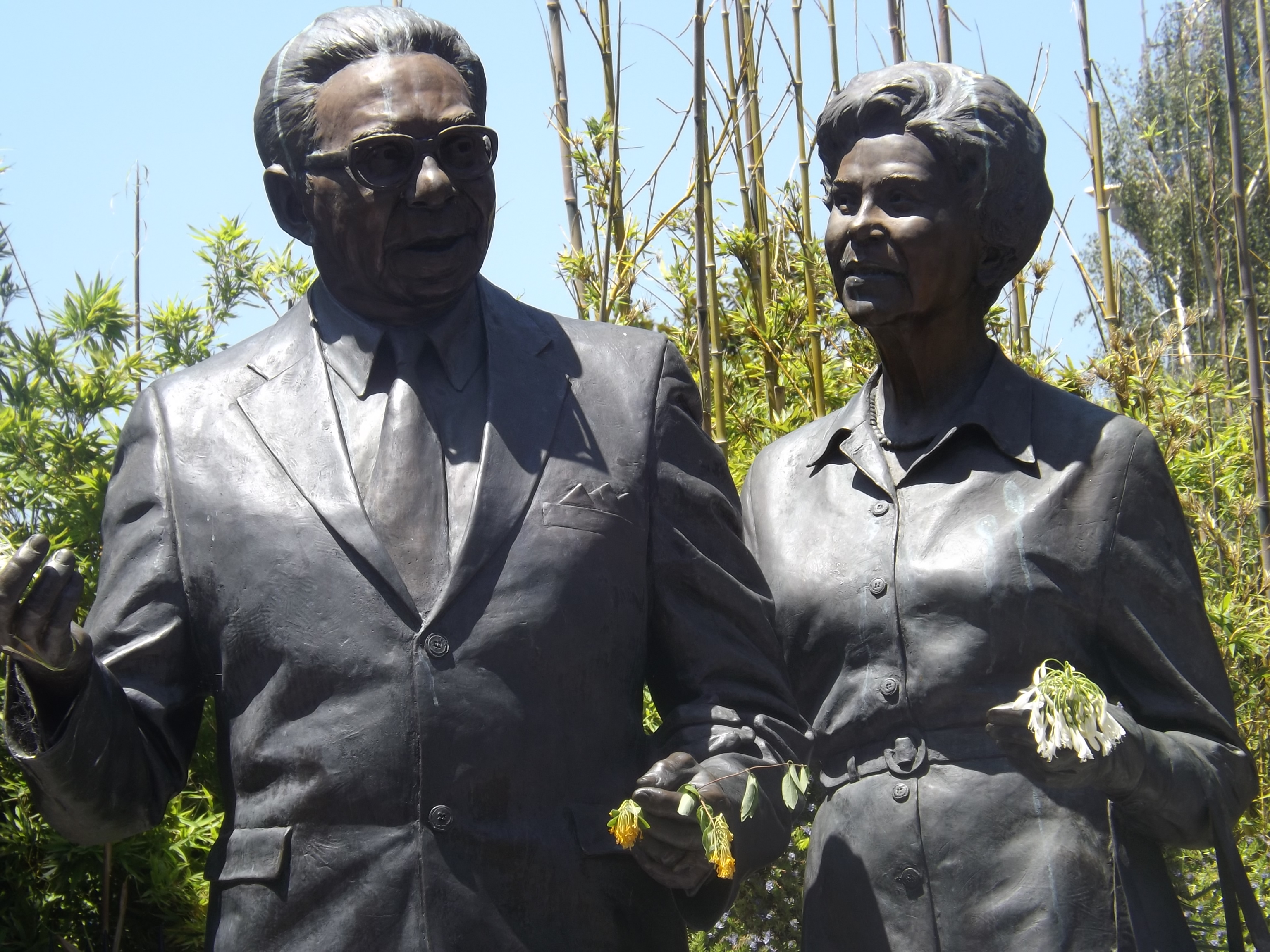
A statue of Sir Douglas and Lady Gladys Nicholls, the division's namesakes

The division is named in honour of Sir Douglas and Lady Gladys Nicholls, in recognition of their contributions to the advocacy of Aboriginal rights.

The Division of Nicholls was created in 2019 after the Australian Electoral Commission oversaw a mandatory redistribution of divisions in Victoria. Nicholls replaced the Division of Murray in the same location.

Prior to the 2019 election the seat was notionally held by the National Party on a margin of 22.3%, making it a very safe seat for the party. Its predecessor had been safely conservative for nearly its entire existence since its creation in 1949, with the Liberal Party and the National Party holding it for long spells. Indeed, much of this region has been held by a conservative party since Federation; the area was part of the Division of Echuca from 1901 to 1937, then Indi from 1937 to 1949.

The final member for Murray, Damian Drum of the Nationals, followed most of his constituents into Nicholls and easily retained it, albeit with a small swing against him.

== Members ==
Image	Member	Party	Term	Notes
	Damian Drum (1960–)	Nationals	18 May 2019 – 11 April 2022	Previously held the Division of Murray. Retired
	Sam Birrell (1975–)	Nationals	21 May 2022 – present	Incumbent

== Election results ==
2025 Australian federal election: Nicholls
Party	Candidate	Votes	%	±%
National	Sam Birrell	48,762	46.24	+21.93
Labor	Kim Travers	25,560	24.24	+11.08
One Nation	Aaron Tyrrell	12,095	11.47	+4.87
Greens	Shelby Eade	8,235	7.81	+4.08
Trumpet of Patriots	Glenn Floyd	4,999	4.74	+4.24
Family First	Paul Bachelor	4,717	4.47	+4.47
Citizens	Jeff Davy	1,082	1.03	+0.66
Total formal votes		105,450	94.99	+2.63
Informal votes		5,556	5.01	−2.63
Turnout		111,006	91.45	+1.49
Two-party-preferred result
National	Sam Birrell	67,887	64.38	+1.87
Labor	Kim Travers	37,563	35.62	−1.87
National hold		Swing	+1.87	
