= Shire of Benalla =

Coordinates: 36°37′S 145°58′E

Shire of Benalla Victoria
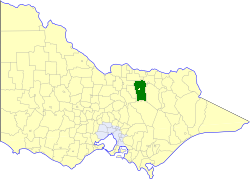
- Location in Victoria
- The Shire of Benalla as at its dissolution in 1994
- Population: 5,670 (1992)
  - Density: 2.4419/km^{2} (6.324/sq mi)
- Established: 1868
- Area: 2,322 km^{2} (896.5 sq mi)
- Council seat: Benalla
- Region: Hume
- County: Delatite, Moira
LGAs around Shire of Benalla:
Shepparton	Tungamah	Wangaratta
Violet Town	Shire of Benalla	Oxley
Euroa	Mansfield	Oxley

The Shire of Benalla was a local government area about 188 kilometres (117 mi) northeast of Melbourne, the state capital of Victoria, Australia. The shire covered an area of 2,322 square kilometres (896.5 sq mi), and existed from 1868 until 1994. From 1948 onwards, Benalla itself was managed by a different entity, later known as the City of Benalla.

== History ==
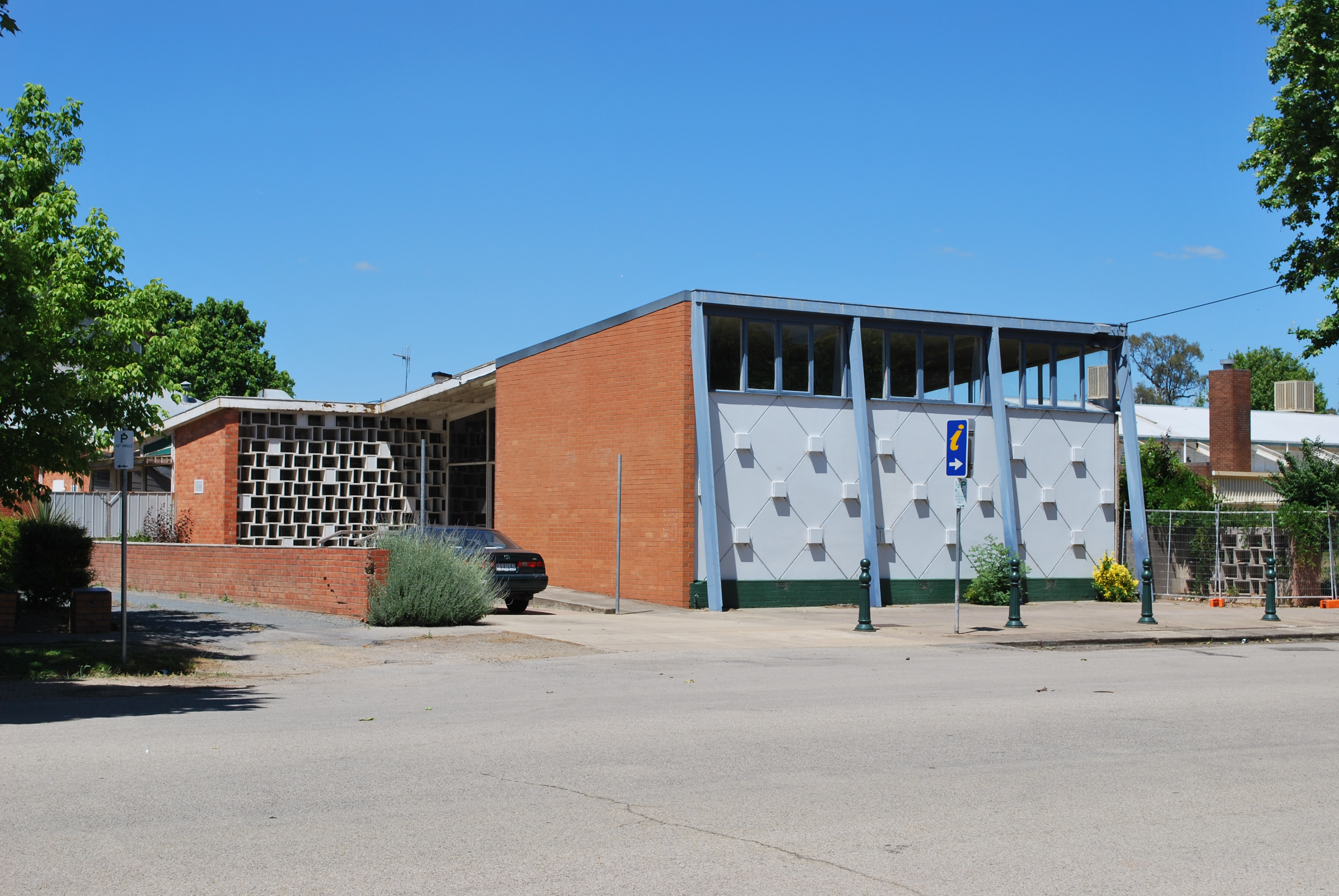
The Shire's offices, which today are a library.

Benalla was first incorporated as a road district on 4 September 1868, and became a shire on 3 September 1869. The declared area included the Shire of Euroa, which was severed and incorporated on 3 November 1879.

Over the following years, the Shire of Benalla lost small amounts of territory at its edges:

- 11 April 1895 - Parts of the Warrenbayne Riding was transferred to the Shire of Violet Town;
- 23 December 1903 - Parts of the Devenish Riding was transferred to the Shire of Shepparton;
- 31 May 1906 - Parts of the Mokoan Riding was transferred to the Shire of Wangaratta.

On 1 September 1948, after considerable growth of Benalla as a regional centre, the Central Riding was severed, and became the Borough of Benalla, later becoming the City of Benalla, on 26 May 1965. On four occasions (10 April 1956, 1 February 1964, 17 September 1969, 13 February 1980), land was transferred to the City of Benalla.

On 18 November 1994, the Shire of Benalla was abolished, and along with the City of Benalla, the Shire of Mansfield, and the Warrenbayne district of the Shire of Violet Town, was merged into the newly created Delatite Shire. The Glenrowan district was transferred to the newly created Rural City of Wangaratta.

Delatite Shire itself was abolished in 2002, with its former area divided between the Rural City of Benalla and the Shire of Mansfield.

== Wards ==
The Shire of Benalla was divided into four ridings, each of which elected three councillors:

- Devenish Riding
- Mokoan Riding
- Tatong Riding
- Warrenbayne Riding

== Towns and localities ==
- Archerton
- Baddaginnie
- Boweya
- Boxwood
- Bungeet
- Chesney Vale
- Devenish
- Glenrowan
- Goomalibee
- Goorambat
- Lake Mokoan
- Lake Nilacootie
- Lima
- Lurg
- Molyullah
- Moorngag
- Samaria
- Stewarton
- Swanpool
- Taminick
- Tarnook
- Tatong
- Thoona
- Toorour Reservoir
- Upper Lurg
- Warrenbayne
- Winton

== Population ==
Year	Population
1947	8,461
1954	4,407+
1958	3,690*
1961	3,718
1966	3,732
1971	3,329
1976	3,576
1981	4,216
1986	5,002
1991	5,519

* Estimate in the 1958 Victorian Year Book.
+ The combined population of the Shire and Borough in 1954 was 10,452.
