= Results of the 1997 Victorian local elections =

This is a list of local government area results for the 1997 Victorian local elections.

== Delatite ==
1997 Delatite Shire Council election
3–14 March 1997	2000 →

All 8 seats on Delatite Shire Council 5 seats needed for a majority
- Turnout: 77.9%

The Delatite Shire Council was elected from eight single-member ridings using preferential voting. Votes were received between 3 and 14 March. The sole candidate in Alpine riding was elected unopposed, and thus no election was held in that riding.

=== Alpine ===
1997 Victorian local elections: Alpine Riding
Party	Candidate	Votes	%	±%
Independent	Barb Jones	unopposed		
Registered electors		1,561		
Independent win		(new riding)		

=== Benalla Civic ===
1997 Victorian local elections: Benalla Civic Riding
Party	Candidate	Votes	%	±%
Independent	Michael Teague	830	42.33	
Independent	Ron Irwin	538	27.43	
Independent	Vincent Branigan	386	19.68	
Independent	Bill Dewing	207	10.56	
Total formal votes		1,961	97.95	
Informal votes		40	2.05	
Turnout		2,002	76.70	
Registered electors		2,610		
Two-candidate-preferred result
Independent	Michael Teague	1,217	62.06	
Independent	Ron Irwin	744	37.94	
Independent win		(new riding)		

=== Benalla Gardens ===
1997 Victorian local elections: Benalla Gardens Riding
Party	Candidate	Votes	%	±%
Independent	Eric Brewer	782	41.57	
Independent	Maureen Rosina Read	568	30.20	
Independent	Peter Hall	531	28.23	
Total formal votes		1,881	97.77	
Informal votes		43	2.23	
Turnout		1,924	77.96	
Registered electors		2,468		
Two-candidate-preferred result
Independent	Eric Brewer	1,082	57.52	
Independent	Maureen Rosina Read	799	42.48	
Independent win		(new riding)		

=== Benalla Heritage ===
1997 Victorian local elections: Benalla Heritage Riding
Party	Candidate	Votes	%	±%
Independent	Brian Francis Caughey	911	48.66	
Independent	Geoff Oliver	561	29.97	
Independent	Graeme Bechaz	254	13.57	
Independent	Graham Ings	146	7.80	
Total formal votes		1,872	98.89	
Informal votes		21	1.11	
Turnout		1,893	83.98	
Registered electors		2,254		
After distribution of preferences
Independent	Brian Francis Caughey	993	53.04	
Independent	Geoff Oliver	583	31.14	
Independent	Graeme Bechaz	296	15.81	
Independent win		(new riding)		

=== Lakeland ===
1997 Victorian local elections: Lakeland Riding
Party	Candidate	Votes	%	±%
Independent	Tom Ingpen	1,255	59.79	
Independent	Jennie Baker	844	40.21	
Total formal votes		2,099	97.76	
Informal votes		48	2.24	
Turnout		2,147	69.17	
Registered electors		3,104		
Independent win		(new riding)		

=== Mansfield Urban ===
1997 Victorian local elections: Mansfield Urban Riding
Party	Candidate	Votes	%	±%
Independent	Phil McCann	881	53.56	
Independent	David J. Ritchie	764	46.44	
Total formal votes		1,645	97.57	
Informal votes		41	2.43	
Turnout		1,686	79.34	
Registered electors		2,125		
Independent win		(new riding)		

=== Mokoan ===
1997 Victorian local elections: Mokoan Riding
Party	Candidate	Votes	%	±%
Independent	Ken Whan	571	52.00	
Independent	Peter Davis	333	30.33	
Independent	John C. Mitchell	194	17.67	
Total formal votes		1,098	99.10	
Informal votes		10	0.90	
Turnout		1,108	81.11	
Registered electors		1,366		
Independent win		(new riding)		

=== Swanpool ===
1997 Victorian local elections: Swanpool Riding
Party	Candidate	Votes	%	±%
Independent	Bill Hill (Note: Two candidates named Bill Hill contested the Swanpool riding — the winning candidate, polling 914 votes, was a resident of Molyullah, while the second-placed candidate, polling 431 votes, was a resident of Warrenbayne.)	914	59.54	
Independent	Bill Hill	431	28.08	
Independent	Tom Yates	190	12.38	
Total formal votes		1,535	98.27	
Informal votes		27	1.73	
Turnout		1,562	82.82	
Registered electors		1,886		
Independent win		(new riding)		
