= Shire of Mansfield (former) =

Shire of Mansfield Victoria
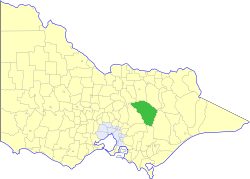
- Location in Victoria
- The former Shire of Mansfield as at its dissolution in 1994
- Population: 6,100 (1992)
  - Density: 1.556/km^{2} (4.03/sq mi)
- Established: 1865
- Area: 3,919.10 km^{2} (1,513.2 sq mi)
- Council seat: Mansfield
- Region: Hume
- County: Anglesey, Delatite, Tanjil, Wonnangatta
LGAs around Shire of Mansfield:
Euroa	Benalla	Oxley
Alexandra	Shire of Mansfield	Maffra
Upper Yarra	Narracan	Maffra

The Shire of Mansfield was a local government area about 185 kilometres (115 mi) northeast of Melbourne, the state capital of Victoria, Australia. The shire covered an area of 3,919.10 square kilometres (1,513.2 sq mi), and existed from 1865 until 1994.

== History ==
Mansfield was incorporated as a road district on 6 January 1865, and became a shire on 31 December 1866. On 30 May 1919, it annexed part of the Shire of Howqua, becoming the shire's Howqua Riding.

On 18 November 1994, the Shire of Mansfield was abolished, and along with the City of Benalla, the Shire of Benalla and the Warrenbayne district from the Shire of Violet Town, was merged into the newly created Delatite Shire. Delatite Shire itself was abolished in 2002, with its former area divided between the Rural City of Benalla and a new Shire of Mansfield, created with largely the same territory as the previous shire.

== Wards ==
The Shire of Mansfield was divided into four ridings in 1990, each of which elected three councillors:

- Central Riding
- Alpine Riding
- Delatite Riding
- Midland Riding

== Towns and localities ==
- Ancona
- Bonnie Doon
- Gaffneys Creek
- Goughs Bay
- Jamieson
- Kevington
- Maindample
- Mansfield*
- Matlock
- Merrijig
- Merton
- Mount Buller
- Tolmie
- Woodfield
- Woods Point

* Council seat.

== Population ==
Historical population

Year	Pop.	±% p.a.
1954	5,023	—
1958*	5,160	+0.67%
1961	4,423	−5.01%
1966	4,274	−0.68%
1971	4,260	−0.07%

Year	Pop.	±% p.a.
1976	4,352	+0.43%
1981	4,900	+2.40%
1986	6,430	+5.59%
1991	8,471	+5.67%

* Estimate in the 1958 Victorian Year Book.
