= Broken Creek, Victoria =

Broken Creek
- Town
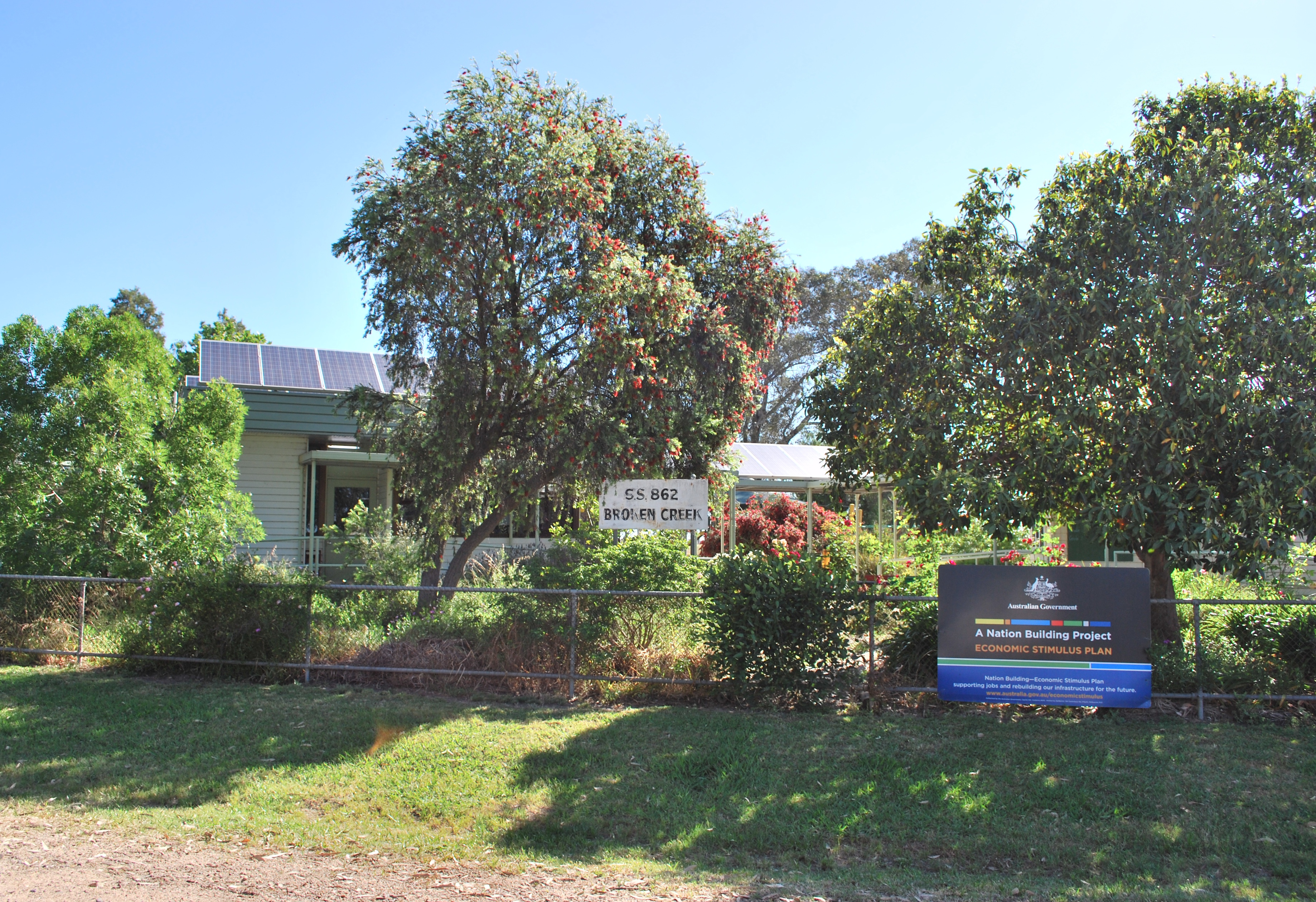
- Primary school at Broken Creek

- Coordinates: 36°25′23″S 145°53′23″E
- Country: Australia
- State: Victoria
- Region: Hume
- LGA: Rural City of Benalla
- Location: 223 km (139 mi) NE of Melbourne; 19 km (12 mi) NW of Benalla; 5 km (3.1 mi) E of Goorambat

Government
  - State electorate: Euroa
  - Federal division: Indi

Population
  - Total: 39 (2016 census)
- Postcode: 3673

Broken Creek is a locality in North-East Victoria, Australia. The locality is in the Rural City of Benalla local government area, and is situated on Broken Creek, 223 kilometres (139 mi) North-East of the state capital, Melbourne.

At the 2016 census, Broken Creek had a population of 39.
