= Electoral results for the district of Euroa =

This is a list of electoral results for the Electoral district of Euroa in Victorian state elections.

== Members for Euroa ==
Member	Party	Term
Stephanie Ryan	National	2014–2022
Annabelle Cleeland	National	2022–present

== Election results ==
=== Elections in the 2020s ===
2022 Victorian state election: Euroa
Party	Candidate	Votes	%	±%
National	Annabelle Cleeland	13,496	32.0	−27.4
Labor	Angela Tough	12,840	30.4	+2.3
Liberal	Brad Hearn	9,227	21.8	+21.8
Greens	James Bennett	2,245	5.3	+0.1
Freedom	Raymond Mark Rowbotham	1,770	4.2	+4.2
Family First	Paul Bachelor	1,494	3.5	+3.5
Animal Justice	Elaine Haddock	1,170	2.8	+2.8
Total formal votes		42,242	94.6	+0.0
Informal votes		2,431	5.4	−0.0
Turnout		44,673	88.2	
Two-party-preferred result
National	Annabelle Cleeland	25,316	59.9	−5.4
Labor	Angela Tough	16,926	40.1	+5.4
National hold		Swing	−5.4	

=== Elections in the 2010s ===
2018 Victorian state election: Euroa
Party	Candidate	Votes	%	±%
National	Stephanie Ryan	24,749	58.95	+23.62
Labor	Fionna Deppeler-Morton	12,003	28.59	+0.74
Independent	Don Firth	3,035	7.23	+7.23
Greens	Keppel Cassidy	2,198	5.24	+0.09
Total formal votes		41,985	94.58	−0.73
Informal votes		2,405	5.42	+0.73
Turnout		44,390	90.13	−3.76
Two-party-preferred result
National	Stephanie Ryan	27,544	65.44	+0.97
Labor	Fionna Deppeler-Morton	14,547	34.56	−0.97
National hold		Swing	+0.97	

2014 Victorian state election: Euroa
Party	Candidate	Votes	%	±%
National	Stephanie Ryan	14,494	35.3	−4.1
Labor	Clare Malcolm	11,428	27.9	+0.8
Liberal	Tony Schneider	10,454	25.5	+12.1
Greens	Simon Roberts	2,110	5.1	−0.8
Family First	Julie-Anne Winzer	1,307	3.2	+1.4
Country Alliance	Lisa Adams	1,238	3.0	−5.1
Total formal votes		41,031	95.3	−0.0
Informal votes		2,016	4.7	+0.0
Turnout		43,047	93.9	+4.5
Two-party-preferred result
National	Stephanie Ryan	26,451	64.5	+0.9
Labor	Clare Malcolm	14,580	35.5	−0.9
National hold		Swing	+0.9	
