= Major Plains =

- Town
- Coordinates: 36°22′S 145°48′E
- Country: Australia
- State: Victoria
- Region: Hume
- LGAs: Rural City of Benalla; City of Greater Shepparton
- Location: 226 km (140 mi) N of Melbourne; 44 km (27 mi) E of Shepparton; 33 km (21 mi) W of Benalla

Government
  - State electorates: Shepparton; Euroa
  - Federal divisions: Indi; Nicholls

Population
  - Total: 37 (2016 census)
- Postcode: 3725

Major Plains is a locality situated to the north-west of Benalla in Victoria, Australia. It is 226 kilometres by road from Melbourne.

The main east–west roads in the locality are Dookie-Devenish Road, Major Plains Road and Gooroombat-Dookie College Road (Thomas Road), while the main north–south roads are Duggans Road, Benalla Boundary Road (which divides the local government areas) and Roberts Road.

A primary school operated in the locality between 1918 and 1946. The original Major Plains Post Office was opened on 1 July 1870 and was temporarily renamed as Devenish Post Office between 1874 and 1878 before closing in 1898. A post office was re-established in 1901 and operated until 1948.

The heavy clay soil originally supported a grey box and red gum grassy woodland, and grassy wetlands to the north of Grogans Road. Native shrub species include mallee wattle (Acacia montana), hedge wattle (Acacia paradoxa), golden wattle (Acacia pycnantha), sweet bursaria (Bursaria spinosa) and drooping cassinia (Cassinia arcuata).
