= City of Benalla =

Coordinates: 36°33′S 145°58′E

City of Benalla Victoria
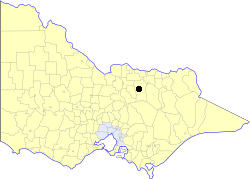
- Location in Victoria
- The City of Benalla as at its dissolution in 1994
- Population: 8,880 (1992)
  - Density: 500.0/km^{2} (1,295.0/sq mi)
- Established: 1948
- Area: 17.76 km^{2} (6.9 sq mi)
- Council seat: Benalla
- Region: Hume
- County: Delatite, Moira

The City of Benalla was a local government area about 188 kilometres (117 mi) northeast of Melbourne, the state capital of Victoria, Australia. The city, which was surrounded by the Shire of Benalla, covered an area of 17.76 square kilometres (6.9 sq mi), and existed from 1948 until 1994.

== History ==
The Shire of Benalla was first incorporated as a road district on 4 September 1868, and became a shire on 3 September 1869.

On 1 September 1948, after considerable growth of Benalla as a regional centre, the Central Riding was severed from the shire, to become the Borough of Benalla. Further land was transferred to the borough on 10 April 1956 and 1 February 1964, after which the borough was proclaimed a city by the Governor of Victoria, on 26 May 1965. Two more transfers of land from the shire to the city occurred; on 17 September 1969 and 13 February 1980.

On 18 November 1994, the City of Benalla was abolished, and along with the Shires of Benalla and Mansfield, and the Warrenbayne district of the Shire of Violet Town, was merged into the Delatite Shire. Delatite Shire itself was abolished in 2002, with its former area divided between the Rural City of Benalla and the Shire of Mansfield.

=== Wards ===
Benalla was not divided into wards, and the nine councillors represented the entire city.

== Population ==
Year	Population
1954	6,045
1958	7,220*
1961	8,234
1966	8,213
1971	8,255
1976	8,300
1981	8,151
1986	8,490
1991	8,334

* Estimate in the 1958 Victorian Year Book.
