= Upotipotpon =

- Town
- Coordinates: 36°28′S 145°46′E
- Country: Australia
- State: Victoria
- Region: Hume
- LGA: Shire of Strathbogie
- Location: 208 km (129 mi) NE of Melbourne; 28 km (17 mi) NW of Benalla; 27 km (17 mi) N of Violet Town

Government
  - State electorate: Euroa
  - Federal division: Indi

Population
  - Total: 56 (SAL 2021)
- Postcode: 3673

Upotipotpon is a locality in Victoria, Australia, 208 kilometres (129 mi) north-east of the state capital, Melbourne, and 27 kilometres (17 mi) km north of Violet Town. As of the 2021 Australian census, the population was 56. The name may derive from the Aboriginal expression pootong pootong, meaning "plenty of grass", and was used for a pastoral property taken up in 1841 between the Broken River and Stony Creek.

A small town used to exist in the area. Between 1882 and 1888, four primary schools were opened in the district, all carrying the Upotipotpon name. They were closed between 1938 and 1951. A post office, Upotipotpon Station, opened around 1902. It was renamed Upotipotpon around 1907 and closed in 1913. In 1911, the population was 240 and in 1933, it was 131.

Upotipotpon is one of the home towns listed on the Australian War Memorial in London.
