= Shire of Violet Town =

Coordinates: 36°38′S 145°44′E

- Local government area
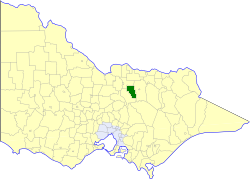
- Location in Victoria
- The Shire of Violet Town as at its dissolution in 1994
- Country: Australia
- State: Victoria
- Region: Hume
- Established: 1895
- Council seat: Violet Town

Area
  - Total: 935 km^{2} (361 sq mi)

Population
  - Total: 1,510 (1992)
  - Density: 1.615/km^{2} (4.183/sq mi)
- County: Delatite, Moira
LGAs around Shire of Violet Town
Shepparton	Shepparton	Benalla
Euroa	Shire of Violet Town	Benalla
Euroa	Euroa	Benalla

The Shire of Violet Town was a local government area about 170 kilometres (106 mi) northeast of Melbourne, the state capital of Victoria, Australia. The shire covered an area of 935 square kilometres (361.0 sq mi), and existed from 1895 until 1994.

== History ==
Violet Town was first incorporated as a shire on 11 April 1895, having previously been part of the Shire of Benalla and the Shire of Euroa.

On 18 November 1994, the Shire of Violet Town was abolished, and along with the Shires of Euroa, Goulburn and some neighbouring districts, was merged into the newly created Shire of Strathbogie. Caniambo and Tamleugh were transferred to the newly created City of Greater Shepparton, whilst the Warrenbayne district was merged into the newly created Delatite Shire.

== Ridings ==
The Shire of Violet Town was divided into three ridings, each of which elected three councillors:

- North Riding
- Central Riding
- South Riding

== Towns and localities ==
- Boho South
- Caniambo
- Creek Junction
- Earlston
- Gowangardie
- Koonda
- Marraweeny
- Tamleugh
- Upotipotpon
- Violet Town*

* Council seat.

== Population ==
Year	Population
1911	2,447
1954	1,424
1958	1,460*
1961	1,360
1966	1,236
1971	1,186
1976	1,248
1981	1,272
1986	1,393
1991	1,443

* Estimate in the 1958 Victorian Year Book.
