= Delatite Shire =

- Local government area
- Location in Victoria

- Country: Australia
- State: Victoria
- Region: Hume
- Established: 18 November 1994
- Abolished: 28 October 2002
- Council seat: Benalla

Government
  - Mayor: Fmr Cr Don Cummins
  - State electorate: Benalla
  - Federal division: Indi, McEwen

Area
  - Total: 6,218 km^{2} (2,401 sq mi)

Population
  - Total: 21,553 (2001 census)
  - Density: 3.4662/km^{2} (8.9775/sq mi)
LGAs around Delatite Shire
Strathbogie	Moira	Wangaratta
Murrindindi	Delatite Shire	Wangaratta
Yarra Ranges	Baw Baw	Wellington

The Delatite Shire was a local government area in Victoria, Australia, located in the north-east part of the state. It covered an area of 6,218 square kilometres (2,401 mi^{2}) and, at the 2001 census, had a population of 21,553. It included the towns of Benalla and Mansfield, and was formed in 1994 from the amalgamation of the City of Benalla, Shire of Benalla, the then Shire of Mansfield and part of the Shire of Violet Town. In 2002 the shire was split into the Rural City of Benalla and Shire of Mansfield. This process has been cited as an example of successful de-amalgamation by residents of other councils who are unhappy with the forced mergers that affected almost all Victorian local government areas in 1994.

The Delatite Shire Council had its seat of local government and administrative centre in Benalla, with a service centre located in Mansfield.

== Creation and amalgamation ==
Following the 1992 Victorian state election, in which the Liberal–National coalition led by Jeff Kennett was elected, a number of reforms were introduced to local government in Victoria. These were overseen by two separate ministers: Roger Hallam, a National Party member from Hamilton who served as Minister for Local Government from 1992, and Robert Maclellan, a Liberal Party member representing Pakenham who replaced Hallam as minister following the 1996 election. The Local Government (General Amendment) Bill of 1993 allowed for the Governor in Council to unilaterally make orders changing local government boundaries, and removed rights of appeal to the Supreme Court of Victoria regarding changes to local government boundaries. The Local Government Board was established in August 1993, with Leonie Burke, a former mayor of the City of Prahran and a future Liberal MP, as its chair.

Hallam directed the Local Government Board to conduct a review of local government restructuring in the north-east of Victoria on 3 June 1994. In submissions to the Board, the City of Benalla and the Shire of Benalla presented almost identical (Note: The one difference was that the City of Benalla's preferred proposal included areas of the Shire of Shepparton, which were omitted in the Shire of Benalla's proposal.) preferences for amalgamation, proposing to merge with each other and the shires of Euroa and Violet Town. As their secondary option, both the City and Shire proposed adding the Shire of Mansfield to the four-council merger. Meanwhile, the Shire of Mansfield primarily favoured standing alone, offering forward three alternate possibilities – a merger with a number of surrounding alpine districts, a merger with the City and Shire of Benalla, and a merger with parts of Benalla and Oxley shires.

In their September 1994 report, the Local Government Board proposed the creation of the Municipality of Delatite, a merger of the City of Benalla, Shire of Benalla, and Shire of Mansfield, excluding the Shire of Benalla's Glenrowan district. Peter Chen of the University of Melbourne states that the name Delatite comes from the Delatite River, and was connected with the southern Mansfield end of the proposed municipality.

In its reasonings for proposing the creation of Delatite, the Board cited business, educational, and governmental links between Benalla and Mansfield, as well as the municipality having a roughly equal mix of urban and rural populations, which made up 53 and 47 per cent of Delatite's population respectively. (Note: The Board described urban populations as that of the City of Benalla and of the township of Mansfield.) It described Delatite as combining "distinct yet complementary" types of industry — urban services in the City of Benalla, tourism in Mansfield, and agriculture in rural areas. (Note: In proceedings at the Australasian Politicial Studies Conference, Peter Chen notes that the Board did not specify why seemingly differing industries, such as agriculture and tourism, would be considered complimentary.) The Board noted that the length of Delatite from north to south — 150 km (93.21 mi) — was a considerable one, but much of the municipality was uninhabited Crown land, and remote villages in the existing Shire of Mansfield, such as Jamieson, would likely continue to access municipal services from the town of Mansfield. The Shire of Benalla believed the need for maintaining local government presence in Mansfield would likely limit the municipality of Delatite's financial efficiency. While the Board considered alternatives to Delatite, such as merging the shires of Alexandra, Mansfield, and Yea, the options of including Euroa and Violet Town shires, as preferred by the two Benallas, were not deeply considered in the Board's proposal for Delatite.

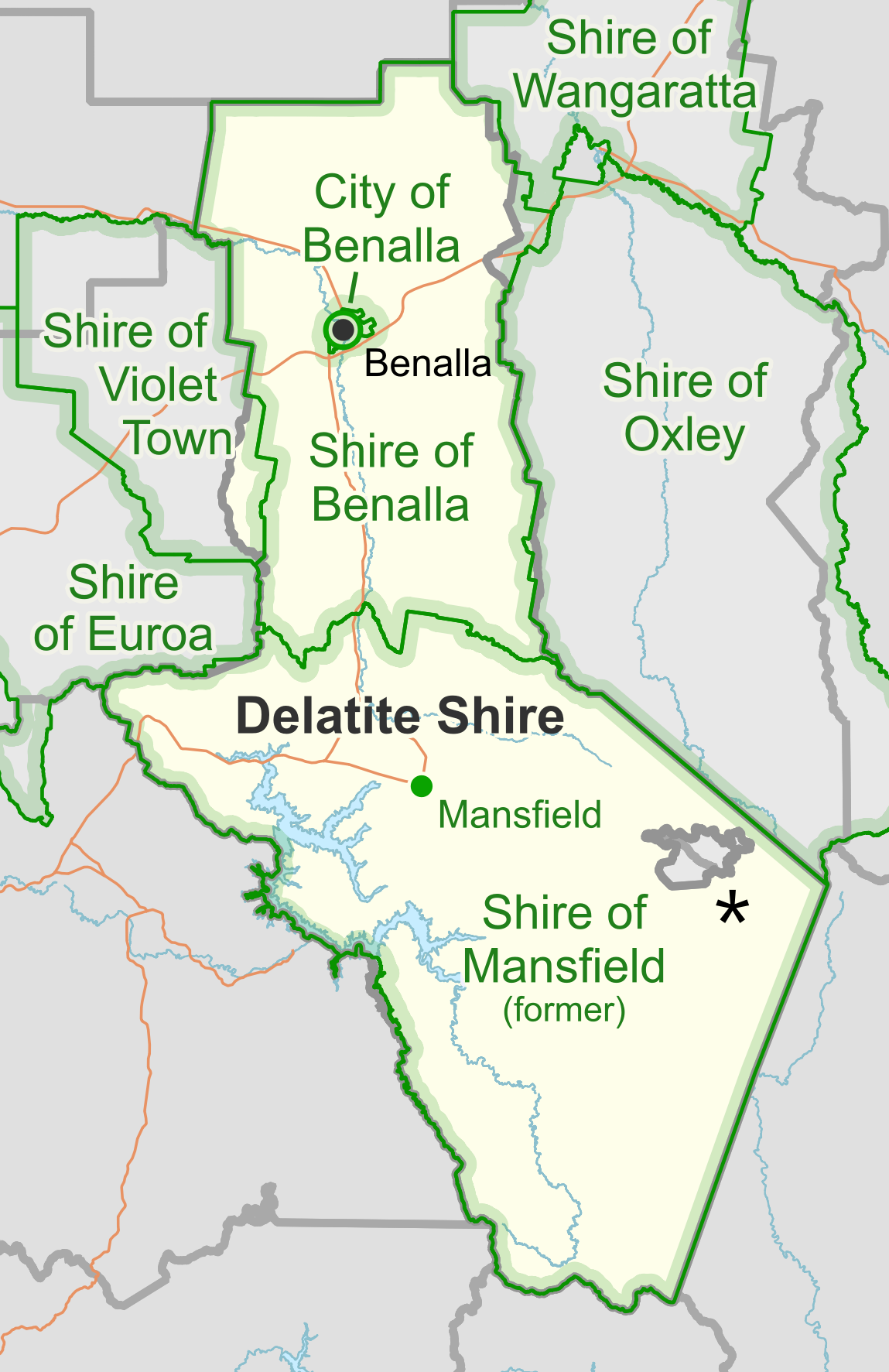
Delatite Shire's predecessor LGAs (green) as they were in 1994. The administrative centres of the previous LGAs are marked by green dots. 🞲 The Mount Buller and Mount Stirling Alpine Resorts were excised in 1997

On 18 November 1994, the City of Benalla, Shire of Benalla, and Shire of Mansfield all officially ceased to exist, being amalgamated into the new Delatite Shire. The boundaries of the new Delatite Shire included the two Benallas and Mansfield (excluding the Glenrowan district of the Shire of Benalla, which was included in the Shire of Milawa), and the Warrenbayne district of the Shire of Violet Town.

== De-amalgamation ==
Following the 1999 Victorian state election, in which the Kennett government was defeated, dissatisfied residents of Mansfield began actively campaigning for the dissolution of the Delatite Shire. The Mansfield District Residents' and Ratepayers' Association (MDRRA) was formed on 5 January 2000 at a public meeting in Mansfield in which 750 attended, aiming to run candidates in the 2000 council elections on a platform of de-amalgamation. David Parsons, a Mansfield solicitor, was MDRRA's inaugural president.

MDRRA meetings were held in four out of Delatite's eight ridings to select candidates for council — the Mansfield-based Alpine, Lakeland, and Mansfield Central ridings, and the Swanpool riding, which straddled the border of the former Benalla and Mansfield shires. The group endorsed Jessica Graves for Alpine, Steve Junghenn for Lakeland, Will Twycross for Mansfield Central, and Don Cummins for Swanpool.

The 2000 election resulted in all four MDRRA endorsed candidates winning their races, creating a council evenly split between MDRRA councillors and Benalla-based representatives. At a meeting of council on 23 March 2000, Ken Whan was elected as mayor of Delatite Shire. Whan was nominated by Jessica Graves, who initially planned to nominate for mayor. As a condition of being elected mayor, Whan promised not to use his tiebreaker vote in a way that would cause division. On 6 April, Delatite Shire revealed the existence of an agreement signed by seven of the eight councillors, with conditions for when the casting vote of the mayor was to be used, an agreement to elect a mayor from Mansfield after the conclusion of Whan's term, and a decision to seek a review of the Delatite Shire. The agreement was titled the "Commitment of Understanding", and referred to by Peter Chen of the University of Melbourne as the Swanpool agreement. It was published by the Benalla Ensign in full on 3 May 2000, and the terms of it are as follows:

1. That Cr Ken Whan be elected as Mayor of Delatite Shire Council for a period not longer than the second Friday in April 2001.
2. That the Mayor of Delatite Shire for the subsequent term expiring on a date not later than the second Friday in April 2002 shall be elected from Councillors representing Swanpool, Lakeland, Alpine and Mansfield Central Ridings.
3. During the mayoralty determined in the manner indicated above, the Mayor undertakes not to use the prerogative of a second vote, provided under the authority of Section 90(1)(e) of the Local Government Act 1989, in a manner which is to the deliberate detriment of one group of council.
4. That the Council seek the assistance of the Victorian Local Governance Association and the Municipal Association of Victoria to approach the Minister for Local Government seeking his support for the conduct of a review of Delatite Shire's performance and community attitudes to the advantages and disadvantages arising from local government reform.

The only councillor not to sign on to the Commitment of Understanding was Eric Brewer, who represented the Benalla Gardens riding. Brewer stated that he was opposed to being bound to elect a councillor from Mansfield as mayor, wanting instead to select the best candidate on merit. Brewer also disagreed with the terms limiting the mayor's casting vote, arguing that the mayor should be free to use his second vote when it would create better outcomes for Delatite Shire.

Despite being a supporter of Delatite Shire's existence, Whan stated in September 2000 that if a vote of the shire's residents was held immediately, it would likely result in 90 percent approving of de-amalgamation. He compared the situation to the division of Korea, with "the north wanting to go one way and the south wanting to go another". Feelings were inflamed in the shire to the point that, per The Age, some Mansfield residents deliberately avoided Benalla for shopping, instead driving to the more distant town of Shepparton.

The state government ultimately allowed for a council-funded study, which would investigate costs associated with de-amalgamation and determine community support for boundary changes in Delatite Shire. Miriam O'Brien Consulting was the firm employed to conduct the study. Following the announcement of the study, political organisations in Benalla began to form with the aim of providing input in the review process — the Benalla and District Residents' Association (BADRA) and the Benalla and District Residents' and Ratepayers Association (BADRRA, which would later rename to Benalla First to prevent confusion). BADRA held no position on de-amalgamation, focusing on issues of local governance and community consultation in the northern end of Delatite, while BADRRA staunchly opposed de-amalgamation.

The late emergence of the two Benalla groups meant that they were unable to have any input on the development of the council-funded review. Additionally, the conflicting views of the organisations meant that neither was able to act as a single, unified voice for Benalla. A poor relationship between the two groups meant that conflict between BADRA and Benalla First often took place in the press. John Brownstein, the founder of BADRA, argued that the town's chamber of commerce, Action Benalla, and the Benalla Ensign, took a strong stance on de-amalgamation, leading them to treat his group unfairly. No such acrimony existed in Mansfield, where MDRRA and the Mansfield and District Tourism Association both advocated for de-amalgamation and had a cordial relationship.

The report from Miriam O'Brien Consulting ultimately concluded that a majority of Shire of Delatite residents were supportive of the shire's division. However, while there was a high level of engagement with the review, participants were far more likely to be from the Mansfield end of the shire — 63 residents from Mansfield gave verbal presentations to the consultants, as opposed to 15 from Benalla, and public information sessions were attended by 900 in Mansfield and 150 in Benalla.

While a small number of residents in Mansfield believed a referendum should take place on de-amalgamation, the findings of the report in favour of division, the result of the 2000 council election, and the cost of a potential referendum were all viewed as reasons for a referendum not to go ahead. A government review panel, established in March 2002, analysed the feasibility of de-amalgamation in Delatite, but chose not to undertake "extensive community consultation" due to the previous council-funded report. Delatite Shire was announced to be de-amalgamated on 22 July 2002 by Premier Steve Bracks, with elections scheduled for the new Benalla and Mansfield shires in March 2003. The Delatite Shire was officially split into the Benalla Rural City and Mansfield Shire on 28 October 2002.

== Administration ==
The Delatite Shire was headquartered in Benalla, where its civic centre was located. A services centre was located in Mansfield.

== Sister city ==
Delatite Shire had one sister city relationship, established in 1997:

- Vail, Colorado, United States of America
