= List of places on the Victorian Heritage Register in the Rural City of Benalla =

This is a list of places on the Victorian Heritage Register in the Rural City of Benalla in Victoria, Australia. The Victorian Heritage Register is maintained by the Heritage Council of Victoria.

The Victorian Heritage Register, as of 2021, lists the following seventeen state-registered places within the Rural City of Benalla:

Place name	Place #	Location	Suburb or Town	Co-ordinates	Built	State registered	Photo
Benalla Botanical Gardens and Art Gallery	VHR H2260	Bridge Street West	Benalla	36.555611°S 145.974111°E	1874	9 December 2010	
Benalla Playground Rocket	VHR H2472	Bridge Street West	Benalla	36.552944°S 145.974945°E	1966	23 April 2026	
Benalla Water Supply Depot	VHR H1048	1-3 Riverview Road	Benalla	36.557111°S 145.990250°E	1879	10 November 1994	
Broken River Bridge	VHR H1043	Bridge Street	Benalla	36.552500°S 145.980972°E	1909	18 August 1994	
Ellen Kelly Homestead Site	VHR H2410	Greta Road	Glenrowan West	36.522889°S 146.172417°E		21 October 2021	
Former Benalla Court House	VHR H1070	69 Arundel Street	Benalla	36.555222°S 145.977778°E	1879	27 April 1995	
Former Benalla Migrant Camp	VHR H2358	1 & 57 Samaria Road	Benalla	36.554944°S 145.999194°E	1941	19 May 2016	
Former Lands Office	VHR H1069	71 Arundel Street	Benalla	36.555333°S 145.978000°E	1861	20 April 1995	
Former Shire Offices	VHR H2189	13 Mair Street	Benalla	36.551278°S 145.982056°E	1958	11 June 2009	
Former Thoona Dairy and Butter Factory	VHR H1330	38 Sargeant Street	Thoona	36.341528°S 146.078500°E	1889	14 August 1997	
Grandstand	VHR H0976	Benalla Showgrounds, Bridge Street West	Benalla	36.554583°S 145.979222°E	1918	22 July 1993	
Holy Trinity Church	VHR H1073	73 Arundel Street	Benalla	36.555444°S 145.978250°E	1865	20 April 1995	
Kelly Gang Camp Site	VHR H2123	Old Tolmie Road	Archerton	36.859694°S 146.184250°E	1876	10 September 2009	
National Bank	VHR H1056	75-79 Nunn Street	Benalla	36.550944°S 145.983528°E	1891	10 November 1994	
Rail Bridge	VHR H1061	Over Broken River	Benalla	36.547083°S 145.977389°E	1879	2 February 1995	
Spring Creek Sawmill and Seasoning Works	VHR H1824	Mount Samaria State Park	Bridge Creek	36.867000°S 146.094528°E	1923	17 June 1999	
St Joseph's Catholic Church	VHR H0845	42 Arundel Street	Benalla	36.553722°S 145.975556°E	1866	6 February 1991	
Stringybark Creek site	VHR H2205	Stringybark Creek Road and Tatong-Tolmie Road	Archerton	36.868944°S 146.218444°E	1878	10 September 2009	
