= Swanpool, Victoria =

Swanpool
- Town
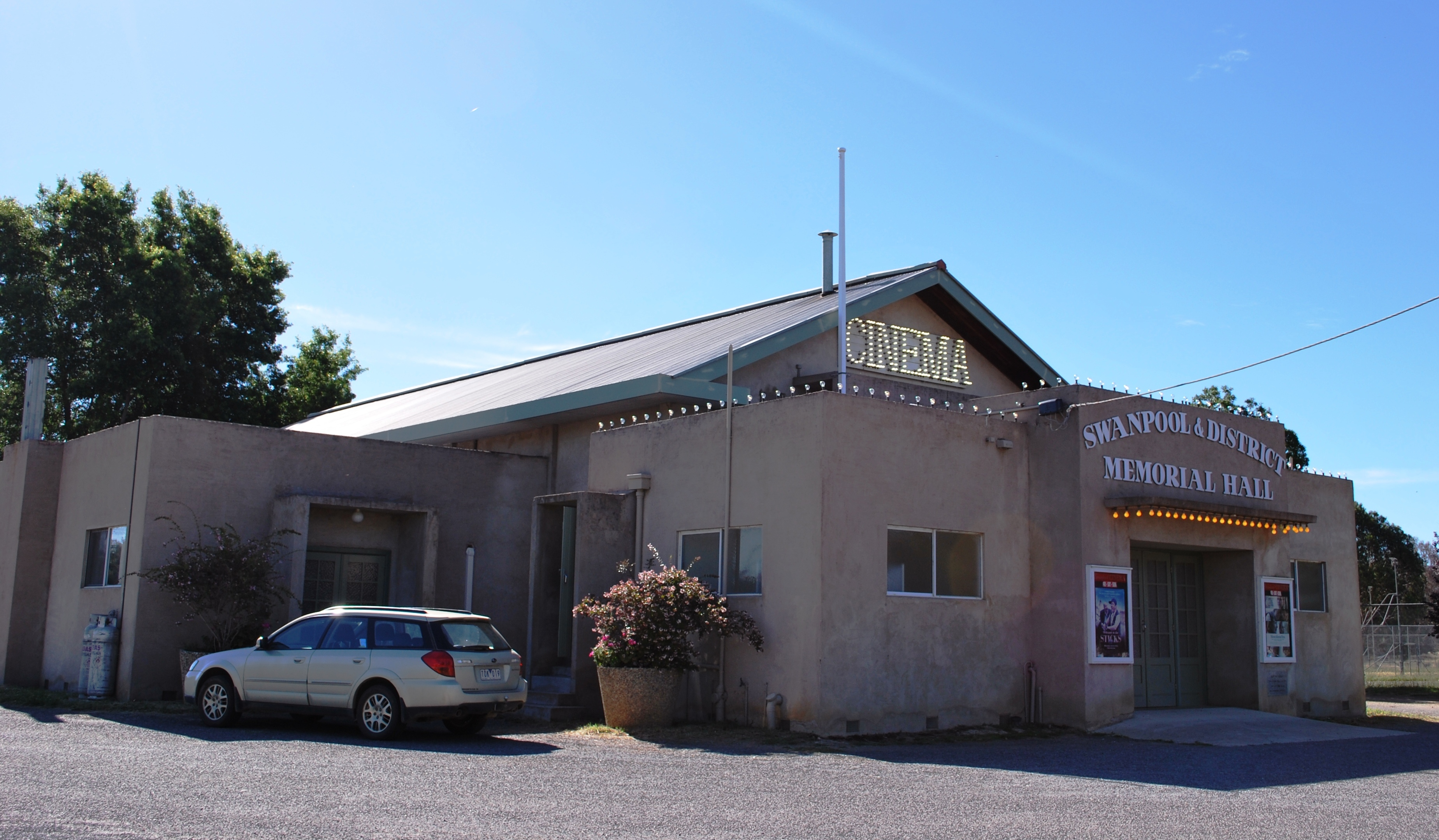
- Memorial Hall and cinema

- Interactive map of Swanpool
- Coordinates: 36°46′S 146°01′E
- Country: Australia
- State: Victoria
- Region: Hume
- LGA: Rural City of Benalla
- Location: 211 km (131 mi) NE of Melbourne; 23 km (14 mi) S of Benalla; 38 km (24 mi) N of Mansfield

Government
  - State electorate: Euroa
  - Federal division: Indi

Population
  - Total: 227 (2021 census)
- Postcode: 3673

Swanpool is a town in north-east Victoria, Australia. The town is located on the Midland Highway and in the Rural City of Benalla local government area, 211 kilometres (131 mi) north east of the state capital, Melbourne. At the 2021 census, Swanpool and the surrounding district had a population of 227.

Swan Pool (sic) Post Office opened on 10 May 1877 and closed in 1994.

Swanpool used to have an Australian Rules football team competing in the Ovens and King Football League until being kicked out by AFL Country.
