= Baddaginnie =

Badaginnie
- Town
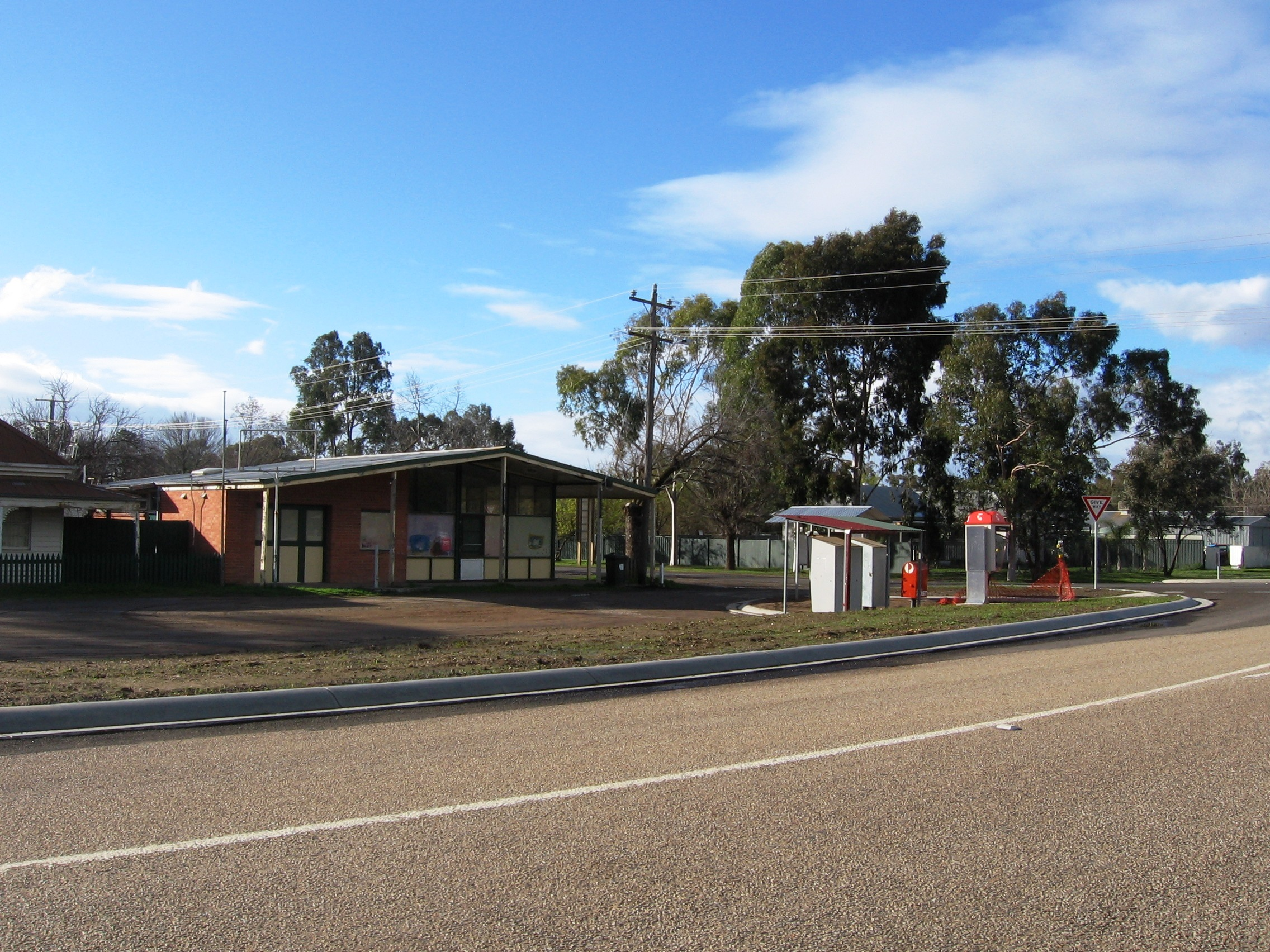
- Shop, no longer operating; a wall with post office boxes is in the foreground with the post box and public phone

- Interactive map of Badaginnie
- Coordinates: 36°35′S 145°52′E
- Country: Australia
- State: Victoria
- Region: Hume
- LGAs: Rural City of Benalla; Shire of Strathbogie
- Location: 198 km (123 mi) NE of Melbourne; 12 km (7.5 mi) SW of Benalla

Government
  - State electorate: Euroa
  - Federal division: Indi

Population
  - Total: 347 (SAL 2021)
- Postcode: 3670

Baddaginnie is a town in Victoria, Australia. It is located on the North East railway line, in the Rural City of Benalla, 12 kilometres south-west of Benalla itself on the old Hume Highway.

It is situated in mainly flat unforested country, one kilometre west of Baddaginnie Creek. At the 2021 census, Baddaginnie had a population of 347.

== Etymology ==
This name was related to Sri Lankan labourers who worked in a railway line project in early 1900. Labourers didn't know English and they only used word "Baddaginnie" during the time of working. "Baddaginnie" meaning hungry (බඩගිනි) in Sinhala.

== History ==
The town was surveyed in 1857, named after the nearby Baddaginnie Creek, but settlement was slow, a Post Office finally opening on 16 September 1879. A railway station was open and served passengers until July 1978.

Although often mistaken for an Aboriginal word, Baddaginnie may have been named by a surveyor, J.G.W. Wilmot, who had spent some time in Ceylon (now Sri Lanka), from baddaginnie (bada-gini - literally 'stomach on fire’), meaning "hungry" (Sinhala: බඩගිනි) in the Sinhala language.

== Sport & Recreation ==
George "Joey" Palmer, the 1880s Australian test cricketer, died there on 22 August 1910.

=== Baddaginnie Football Club ===
Premierships

- Benalla Wednesday Football Association
  - 1909 - Baddaginnie: 6.8 - 44 d Euroa: 4.10 - 34
- Euroa & District Football Association
  - 1925 - Baddaginnie: 6.16 - 52 d Strathbogie: 6.9 - 45
