= Goorambat =

- Town
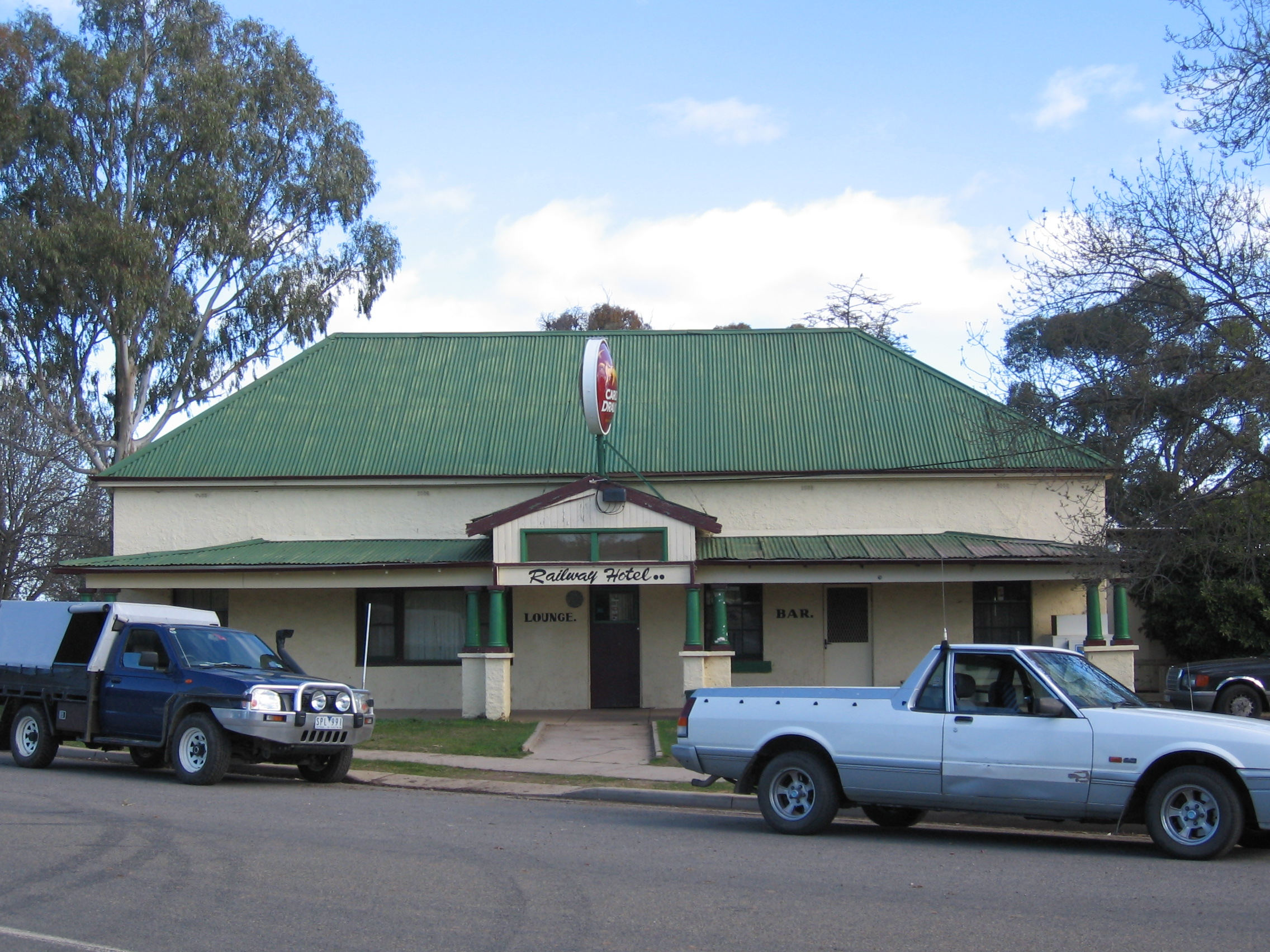
- Railway Hotel

- Interactive map of Goorambat
- Coordinates: 36°25′0″S 145°55′0″E
- Country: Australia
- State: Victoria
- Region: Hume
- LGA: Rural City of Benalla
- Location: 229 km (142 mi) N of Melbourne; 17.5 km (10.9 mi) N of Benalla; 11.5 km (7.1 mi) S of Devenish

Government
  - State electorate: Euroa
  - Federal division: Indi
- Elevation: 200 m (660 ft)

Population
  - Total: 297 (2016 census)
- Postcode: 3725

Goorambat /ˈɡʊərəmbæt/ is a town in northern Victoria, Australia. The town is located in the Rural City of Benalla local government area, 229 kilometres (142 mi) north of the state capital, Melbourne. At the 2016 census, Goorambat and the surrounding area had a population of 297.

== History ==
The Post Office opened on 17 March 1879 and the office named Goorambat Railway Station opened in 1883. Goorambat was later renamed Goorambat East and around 1909 Goorambat Railway Station was renamed to Goorambat. Queen Elizabeth II visited Goorambat in 1954 as part of her Victorian Tour and she stayed over in her royal carriage for one night. The Mechanics Institute hall, commonly known as the Goorambat Hall, opened on 18 September 1888 and is still in use currently.

== Transport ==
Goorambat has a railway station with a grain silo on the Oaklands railway line, Victoria and the Vline bus travels through as part of the Mulwala link from the Albury line to Melbourne.

The town has an Australian Rules football and Netball team competing in the Ovens & King Football League, as well as a cricket team competing in the Benalla and District Cricket association.

== Education ==
Goorambat Primary School opened in 1888 and closed in 2010.
