= Goomalibee =

- Town
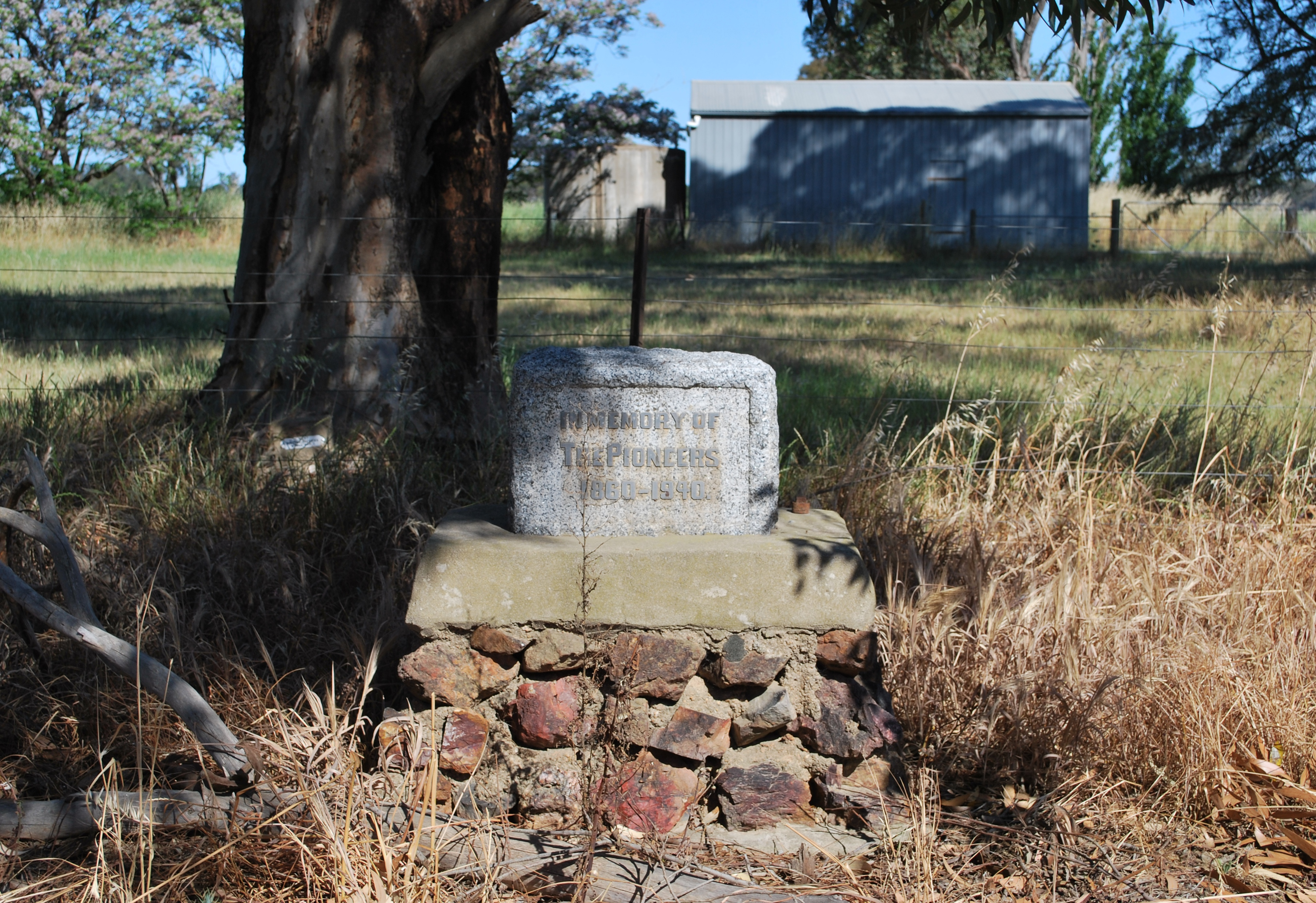
- Monument to the pioneers at Goomalibee

- Coordinates: 36°27′55″S 145°51′34″E
- Country: Australia
- State: Victoria
- Region: Hume
- LGA: Rural City of Benalla
- Location: 214 km (133 mi) NE of Melbourne; 17 km (11 mi) NW of Benalla

Government
  - State electorate: Euroa
  - Federal division: Indi

Population
  - Total: 91 (2021 census)
- Postcode: 3673

Goomalibee is a locality in north east Victoria, Australia. The locality is in the Rural City of Benalla local government area and on the Broken River, 214 kilometres (133 mi) north east of the state capital, Melbourne.

At the 2021 census, Goomalibee had a population of 91.
