= Winton, Victoria =

Winton
- Town
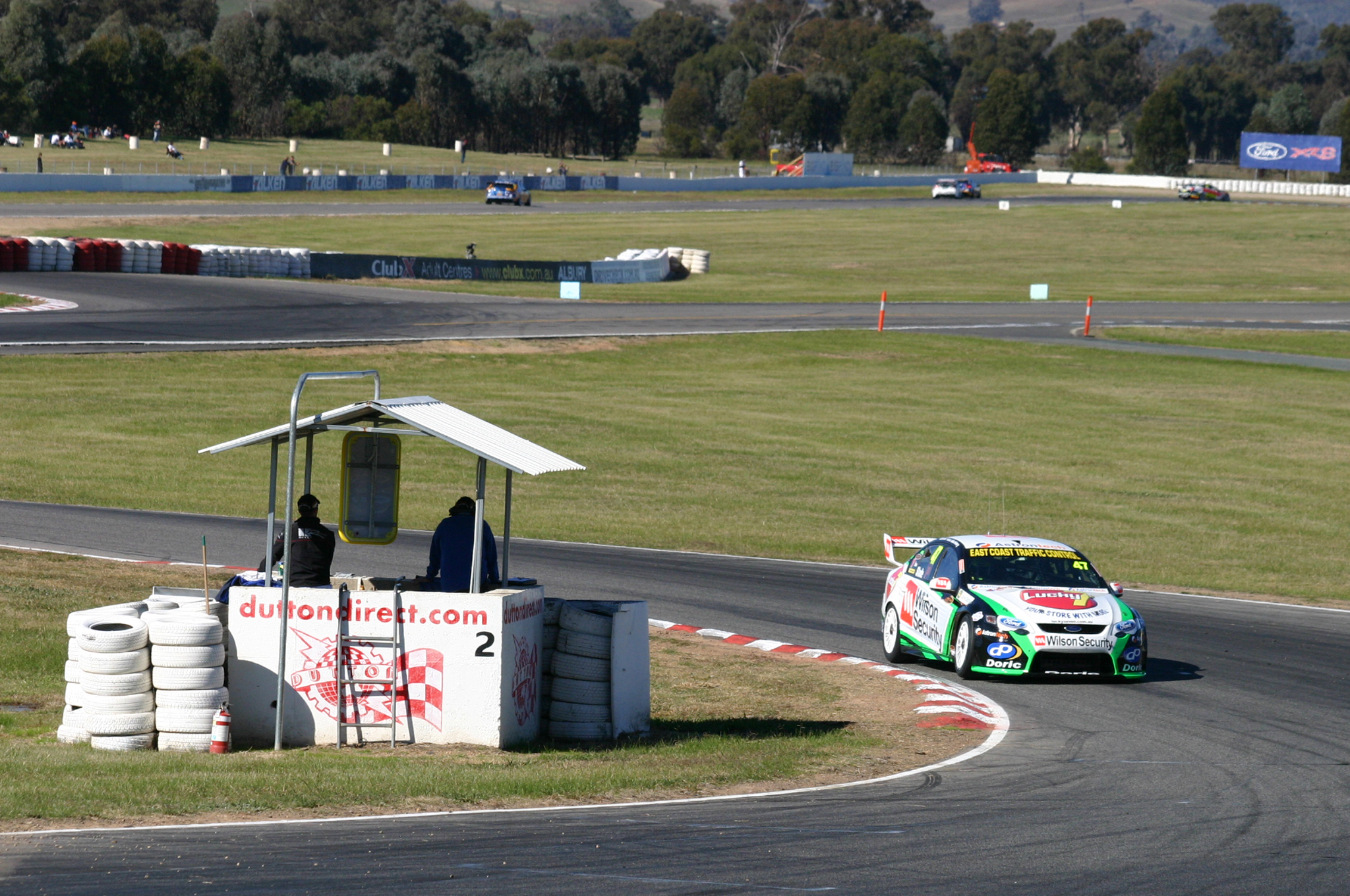
- Tim Slade coming through Turn 2 at Winton Motor Raceway during Friday practice for the 2010 V8 Supercars Winton round.

- Coordinates: 36°30′49″S 146°04′49″E
- Country: Australia
- State: Victoria
- Region: Hume
- LGA: Rural City of Benalla
- Location: 209 km (130 mi) NE of Melbourne; 71 km (44 mi) E of Shepparton; 9 km (5.6 mi) NE of Benalla

Government
  - State electorate: Euroa
  - Federal division: Indi

Population
  - Total: 103 (2021 census)
- Postcode: 3673
- Mean max temp: 43 °C (109 °F)
- Mean min temp: −2 °C (28 °F)

Winton is a locality near Benalla, Victoria, Australia.

It is located in the Glenrowan wine region within 50 km of some of the wineries of North East Victoria, as well as being close to other local attractions including Glenrowan, the site of the famous Bushranger Ned Kelly's last stand.

At the 2016 census, Winton had a population of 108.

== History ==
The Winton Hotel was mentioned in The Age newspaper as early as August 1860, which was owned by Mr. Chandler.

The town of Winton was proclaimed on 25 February 1861.

Winton was named by district surveyor J.G.W. Wilmot, apparently after Winton, Cumbria, where he was said to have been born.

There was a sensational derailment of a goods train on the Melbourne to Sydney railway line at Winton, Victoria in April, 1939.

The Winton Hotel was de-licensed around 1950 and turned into a café.

== Sport & Recreation ==
The first horse race meeting in Winton was held on New Year's Day, 1871, where a race course was staked out opposite the Winton Hotel, while the last annual horse race day appears to of taken place in 1925.

An annual Winton Sports Day was commenced in 1905 and ran up until just prior to World War Two.

Winton has been the home to the Winton Motor Raceway since 1961. Winton SuperSprints have been going on for the V8 Supercars until 2022. However, Winton 300 races are still happening every August with other popular racing series being held every year.

=== Winton Football Club ===
Established in 1905, Winton played off in the grand final of the Greta - Thoona Football Association in 1906.

The club reformed in 1921 after World War One, wearing a maroon jumper and socks, with white shorts and went onto win the 1921 Swanpool and Tatong Football Association premiership.

In 1923 the club wore black and white colours and Clarrie Cooke won the best and fairest award, receiving a gold medal.

G Atkinson was coach in 1924.

Winton played in the Benalla & District Football League between 1929 and 1931 and 1947 and 1957.

Winton FC were in recess for 15 years between 1932 and 1946.

Winton reformed in 1947 after World War Two and entered the Benalla & District Football League, wearing the red and white colors, for the first time in 15 years.

Winton footballers, Dick Joyce won the 1948 and Ken Lakeman won the 1951 Benalla & District Football League best and fairest award.

Winton had Ken Delaney as their captain-coach in 1954.

Premierships

- Glenrowan & Winton Football Association
  - 1907 - Winton: 5.9 - 39 d Swanpool: 2.9 - 21
- Violet Town Wednesday Football Association
  - 1909 - Winton: 5.6 - 36 d Baddaginnie: 1.10 - 16
- Glenrowan Thoona Football Association
  - 1913 - Winton: 3.12 - 30 d Greta: 2.4 - 16
- Winton Glenrowan Football Association
  - 1914 - Winton: 1.9 - 15 d Glenrowan: 2.2 - 14
- Swanpool & Tatong Football Association
  - 1921 - Winton: 10.8 - 68 d Tatong: 2.4 - 16
- Benalla & District Football League
  - 1929 - Winton: 11.7 - 73 d Benalla Juniors: 10.5 - 65
  - 1950 - Winton: 6.14 - 50 d Goorambat: 6.9 - 45

Runners Up

- Greta Glenrowan Football Association
  - 1906 - Thoona: 0.9 - 9 d Winton: 0.2 - 2
- Winton Football Association
  - 1923 - Swanpool: d Winton:
- Greta Thoona Football Association
  - 1925 - Glenrowan: 7.6 - 48 d Winton: 5.5 - 35
- Benalla & District Football League
  - 1951 - Swanpool: 12.4 - 76 d Winton: 5.16 - 46

== Links ==
- 1929 - Benalla District Football League Premiers: Winton FC team photo
