= J. G. W. Wilmot =

Coffee planter and land surveyor (1830–1895)

- Born: 19 September 1830; Winton, Westmorland, England
- Died: 3 August 1895 (aged 64); Brighton, Colony of Victoria
- Occupation: Surveyor

John George Winchester Wilmot (19 September 1830 – 3 August 1895) was an English-born pioneering coffee planter in British Ceylon and a surveyor in Victoria, Australia. In the latter role, he named several Victorian places, including Baddaginnie, Dimboola, Glenrowan, and Winton.

== Early life ==
The details of Wilmot's early life are obscure. His mother was Mary (or Maria) Winchester, and he said his father was Dr C E Wilmot. However, he may have been an illegitimate member of the Wilmot family, related to Sir Robert Wilmot-Horton and Sir John Eardley-Wilmot, 1st Baronet. He claimed to have been born in Winton, Cumbria, but no evidence exists for this. Even his date of birth is uncertain.

He went to school in Boulogne, and ran away to sea in 1842.

== Coffee planter ==
In 1844, Wilmot arrived in Colombo, in the then British Crown Colony of Ceylon. He opened up plantations in Kadugannawa and Kotmale, just below Dimbula. Meanwhile, he learnt surveying, and worked as a contract surveyor.

== Government surveyor ==
News of the New South Wales gold rush caused Wilmot to go to Australia to find his fortune in 1852. However, after several months at the diggings, he gave up and departed for Melbourne. There, he set himself up as a contract surveyor. In 1854, he joined the Surveyor General's department as an assistant surveyor, surveying the telegraph road from Melbourne to Benalla. He then served as District Surveyor in Benalla, Shepparton 1855, Ararat, Portland, and Bairnsdale. He took part in the cadastral survey of Victoria, surveying Borung. A suggestion he made, together with Alfred William Howitt in 1867 led to the survey of the eastern border between Victoria and New South Wales, the Black-Allan Line. He left the service in 1868, and set up on his own.

== Private practice ==
After retirement, Wilmot became an arbitrator, land agent and valuer. He served on the Royal Commission on Land Titles and Surveys in 1885.

== Politics ==
A conservative, identifying strongly with squatter interests, Wilmot was mentioned as a possible candidate for South Gippsland. He was active in overthrowing the government of Sir Graham Berry in 1880. He wrote prolifically to the conservative The Argus, and was the "eminence gris" behind the Melbourne Punch.

In 1894, although hitherto a supporter of Sir Thomas Bent, revelations of Bent's corruption led him to throw his weight behind William Moule. This ensured that Moule replaced Bent as MLA for Brighton. Wilmot was called a "prodigiously active Conservative wire-puller behind the political scenes."

== Personal life ==
In 1867, he married Hannah Louisa Whittakers, the daughter of English-born squatters in Tubbut, north-east Gippsland. The couple had eight children, including Reginald Wilmot, the journalist and sports writer. Following his retirement from the government service, he settled in Brighton, purchasing "Boort Cottage" (which was demolished in the 1960s, being replaced by Rostrevor Hall of Brighton Grammar School).

== Death ==
The end of the 1890s speculative boom led to a reversal of Wilmot's fortunes. In early 1895 he came down with a cold, which settled in his lungs. He died at his home in Brighton. His pallbearers included James Service, Richard Speight, Thomas Prout Webb and Frederic Hughes.

== Legacy ==
While surveying for the Victorian government, Wilmot named several places. Some of them bore Sinhala names, including Baddaginnie (from badagini, hungry), Dookie (from duka, sadness), Dimboola and Gampola (both names of towns in the highlands of Sri Lanka). He named the first five streets of Shepparton (High St, Wyndham St, Fryers St, Welsford St and Vaughan St) in 1855. He apparently named Winton after his place of birth. He also named Bessiebelle, Dundonnell, Dunneworthy, Glenrowan, Mangalore, Miepoll, Willaura and Helendoit.

In 2006, Wilmot's field notes, from his 1865 survey of the country lands of the Parish of Bumberrah, were used to re-establish the boundaries of the crown allotment on the lakeshore of Tambo Bay, Lake King, much of the reservation having been inundated in the meantime.
