= Results of the 2000 Victorian local elections =

This is a list of local government area results for the 2000 Victorian local elections.

== Delatite ==
2000 Delatite Shire Council election
← 1997	2–17 March 2000

All 8 seats on Delatite Shire Council 5 seats needed for a majority
- Turnout: 77.1% (▼0.8 pp)
Largest party before election
Independents
Subsequent largest party
No overall control

The Delatite Shire Council was elected from eight single-member ridings using preferential voting. Results are sourced from the Victorian Electoral Commission, and supported by reports in the Benalla Ensign and the Mansfield Courier. Votes were received between 2 and 17 March. Candidates in Benalla Heritage and Mokoan ridings were elected unopposed, and thus no elections were held in those ridings.

2000 Victorian local elections: Delatite
Party	Votes	%	Seats	Change
Independent candidates	6,584	57.18	4	▼4
Independent MDRRA (Note: Candidates selected by the Mansfield District Ratepayers and Residents' Association, a de-amalgamation advocacy group.)	4,930	42.82	4	new
Total	11,514	100.00	8	Steady
Informal votes	295	2.50		
Turnout (Note: Excluding the uncontested elections in Benalla Heritage and Mokoan.)	11,809	77.10		
Registered voters	15,317			

=== Alpine ===
2000 Victorian local elections: Alpine Riding
Party	Candidate	Votes	%	±%
Independent MDRRA	Jessica Graves	990	57.23	new
Independent	Barb Jones	404	23.36	n/a (Note: Barb Jones was elected unopposed at the 1997 Delatite Shire Council election.)
Independent	Marian Dowling	336	19.42	new
Total formal votes		1,730	98.30	
Informal votes		30	1.70	
Turnout		1,760	68.24	
Registered electors		2,579		
Independent MDRRA gain from Independent		Swing		

=== Benalla Civic ===
2000 Victorian local elections: Benalla Civic Riding
Party	Candidate	Votes	%	±%
Independent	Peter Brown	733	39.47	new
Independent	John Brownstein	389	20.95	new
Independent	Vincent Branigan	385	20.73	−1.05
Independent	Gayle Newnham	350	18.85	new
Total formal votes		1,857	97.89	−0.06
Informal votes		40	2.11	+0.06
Turnout		1,897	78.16	+1.46
Registered electors		2,427		
Two-candidate-preferred result
Independent	Peter Brown	1,112	59.88	new
Independent	Vincent Branigan	745	40.12	+40.12
Independent win		Swing		

=== Benalla Gardens ===
2000 Victorian local elections: Benalla Gardens Riding
Party	Candidate	Votes	%	±%
Independent	Eric Brewer	1,079	59.65	+18.08
Independent	Kathleen Rees	730	40.35	new
Total formal votes		1,809	95.31	−2.46
Informal votes		89	4.69	+2.46
Turnout		1,898	83.25	+4.29
Registered electors		2,280		
Independent hold		Swing	+4.26	

=== Benalla Heritage ===
2000 Victorian local elections: Benalla Heritage Riding
Party	Candidate	Votes	%	±%
Independent	Geoff Oliver	unopposed		
Registered electors		2,636		
Independent win		Swing		

=== Lakeland ===
2000 Victorian local elections: Lakeland Riding
Party	Candidate	Votes	%	±%
Independent MDRRA	Steve Junghenn	1,173	60.94	new
Independent	Tom Ingpen	752	39.06	−20.73
Total formal votes		1,925	97.57	−0.19
Informal votes		48	2.43	+0.19
Turnout		1,973	70.34	+1.17
Registered electors		2,805		
Independent MDRRA gain from Independent		Swing		

=== Mansfield Central ===
2000 Victorian local elections: Mansfield Central Riding
Party	Candidate	Votes	%	±%
Independent MDRRA	Will Twycross	1,596	76.77	new
Independent	Ray Robinson	483	23.23	new
Total formal votes		2,079	97.65	+0.08
Informal votes		50	2.35	−0.08
Turnout		2,129	82.26	+2.92
Registered electors		2,588		
Independent MDRRA gain from Independent		Swing		

=== Mokoan ===
2000 Victorian local elections: Mokoan Riding
Party	Candidate	Votes	%	±%
Independent	Ken Whan	unopposed		
Registered electors		2,497		
Independent hold		Swing		

=== Swanpool ===
2000 Victorian local elections: Swanpool Riding
Party	Candidate	Votes	%	±%
Independent MDRRA	Don Cummins	1,171	55.39	new
Independent	Bill Hill	943	44.61	−14.93
Total formal votes		2,114	98.23	−0.04
Informal votes		38	1.77	+0.04
Turnout		2,152	81.58	−1.24
Registered electors		2,638		
Independent MDRRA gain from Independent		Swing		
