= Tatong =

- Town
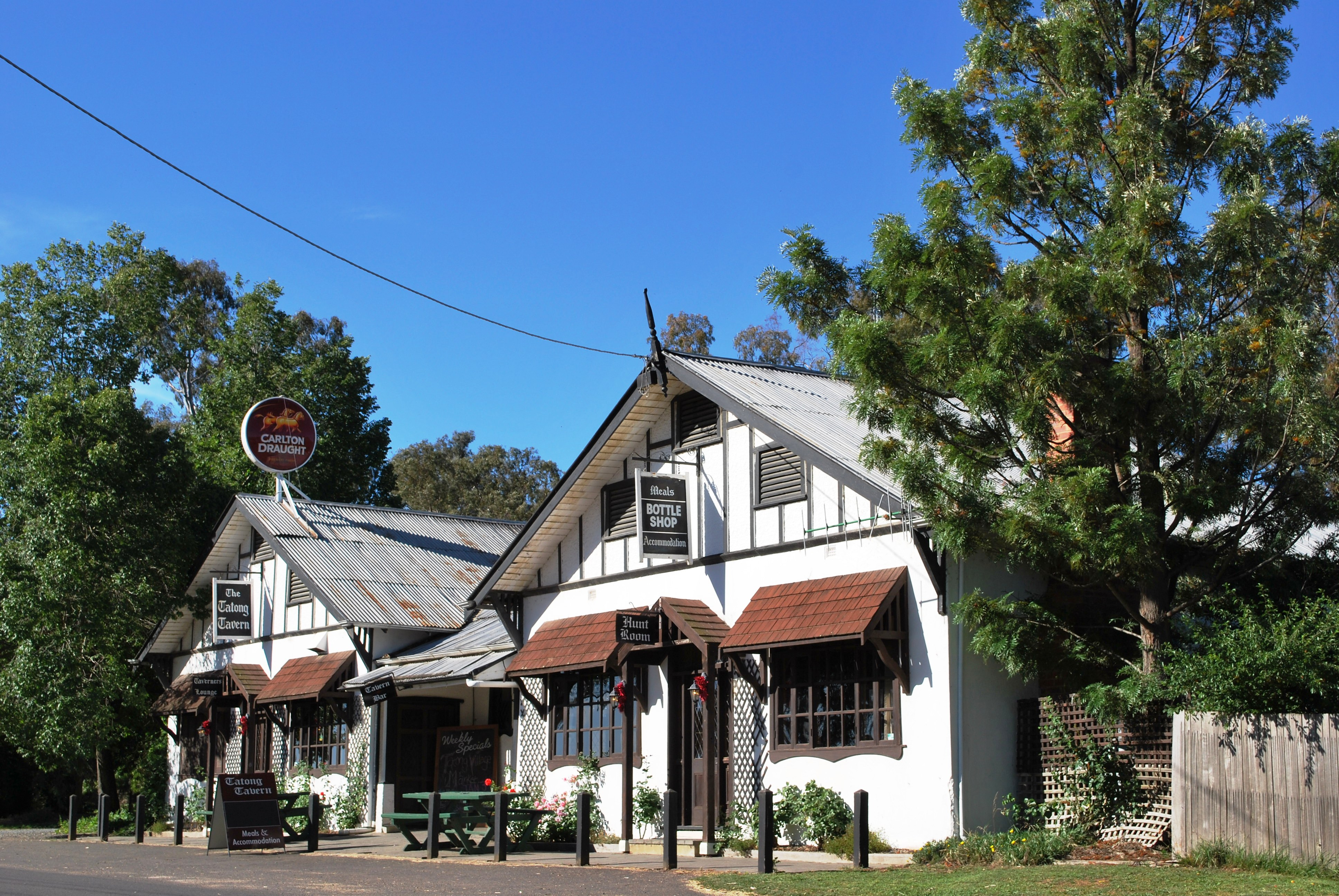
- The Tatong Tavern

- Coordinates: 36°43′44″S 146°6′36″E
- Country: Australia
- State: Victoria
- Region: Hume
- LGA: Rural City of Benalla
- Location: 226 km (140 mi) NE of Melbourne; 27 km (17 mi) S of Benalla; 49 km (30 mi) N of Mansfield; 55 km (34 mi) SSW of Wangaratta

Government
  - State electorate: Euroa
  - Federal division: Indi
- Elevation: 231 m (758 ft)

Population
  - Total: 287 (2016 census)
- Postcode: 3673

Tatong (/tətɒŋ/) is a town in north eastern Victoria, Australia. The town is on the northern foothills of the Blue Ranges, part of the Great Dividing Range, beside Holland Creek, 226 kilometres (140 mi) north east of the state capital, Melbourne. At the 2011 census, Tatong had a population of 350 declining to 287 in 2016.

The area is a mixture of farmland, pine plantations and dense bush

== History ==
The Post Office opened on 10 October 1890 and closed in 1993.

In 1914, a railway from Benalla to Tatong was opened. Timber from the surrounding hills was harvested to supply the early Melbourne power station, but coal from the Latrobe Valley became the favoured fuel source. In February 1928, staff were withdrawn from Tatong railway station. Persistent operating losses on the operation of the line led its closure in July 1947.

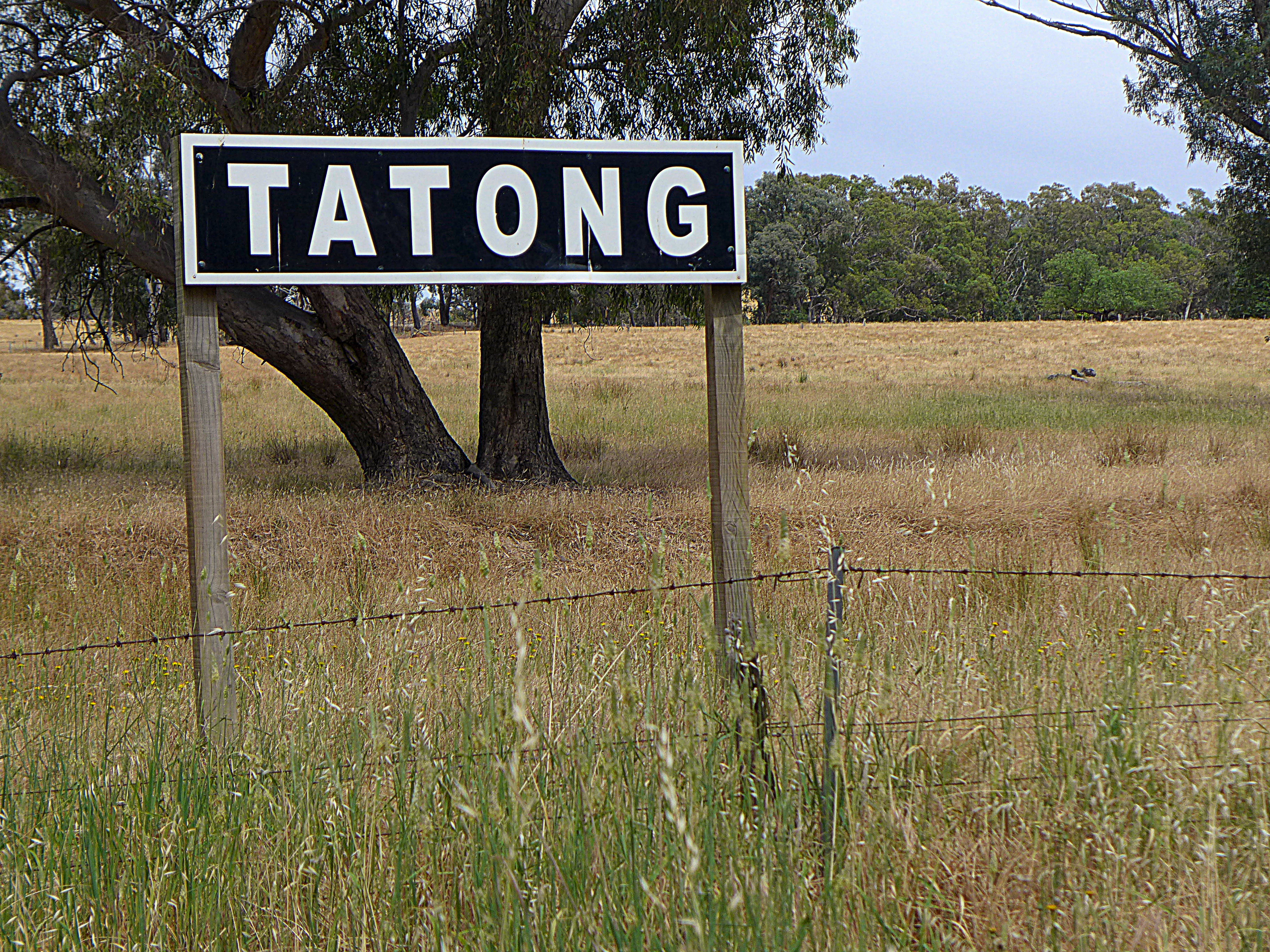
Sign indicating the location of the former Tatong Railway Station.

Tatong is the birthplace of Michael Joseph Savage, the first Labour Prime Minister of New Zealand.

== Facilities ==
It has a pub, the Tatong Tavern, a memorial hall and sports ground.

It has an active community with archery, cricket, tennis and table tennis clubs. Tatong used to have netball and Australian rules football teams competing in the Ovens and King Football League prior to being removed in 2014.

== People from Tatong ==
- Michael Joseph Savage, former Prime Minister of New Zealand
