= Rural City of Benalla =

Coordinates: 36°33′00″S 145°58′00″E

- Local government area
- Location in Victoria

- Interactive map of Rural City of Benalla
- Country: Australia
- State: Victoria
- Region: Hume
- Established: 2002
- Council seat: Benalla

Government
  - Mayor: Cr Danny Claridge
  - State electorate: Euroa
  - Federal division: Indi

Area
  - Total: 2,353 km^{2} (908 sq mi)

Population
  - Total: 14,528 (2021 census)
  - Density: 6.1742/km^{2} (15.991/sq mi)
- Gazetted: 17 October 2002
- Website: Rural City of Benalla
LGAs around Rural City of Benalla
Campaspe	Moira	Wangaratta
Greater Shepparton	Rural City of Benalla	Wangaratta
Strathbogie	Mansfield	Wangaratta

The Rural City of Benalla is a local government area in the Hume region of Victoria, Australia, located in the north-east part of the state. It covers an area of 2,353 square kilometres (908 mi^{2}) and, in August 2021, had a population of 14,528.

It includes the towns of Baddaginnie, Benalla, Devenish, Goorambat, Major Plains, Swanpool, Tatong, Thoona, Warrenbayne and Winton. It was formed in 2002 from the de-amalgamation of the Delatite Shire into the current rural city and the Shire of Mansfield, the former being a merger between the latter, the Shire of Benalla and the City of Benalla.

The Rural City is governed and administered by the Benalla Rural City Council; its seat of local government and administrative centre is located at the council headquarters in Benalla. The Rural City is named after the main urban settlement located in the centre-north of the LGA, that is Benalla, which is also the LGA's most populous urban centre with a population of 10,331.

== Council ==
=== Current composition ===
The council is composed of seven councillors elected to represent an unsubdivided municipality.

Ward	Councillor	Notes
Unsubdivided	Justin King	
Unsubdivided	Danny Claridge	
Unsubdivided	Peter Davis	
Unsubdivided	Don Firth	
Unsubdivided	Bernie Hearn	
Unsubdivided	Gail O'Brien	
Unsubdivided	Punarji Hewa Gunaratne	

=== Administration and governance ===
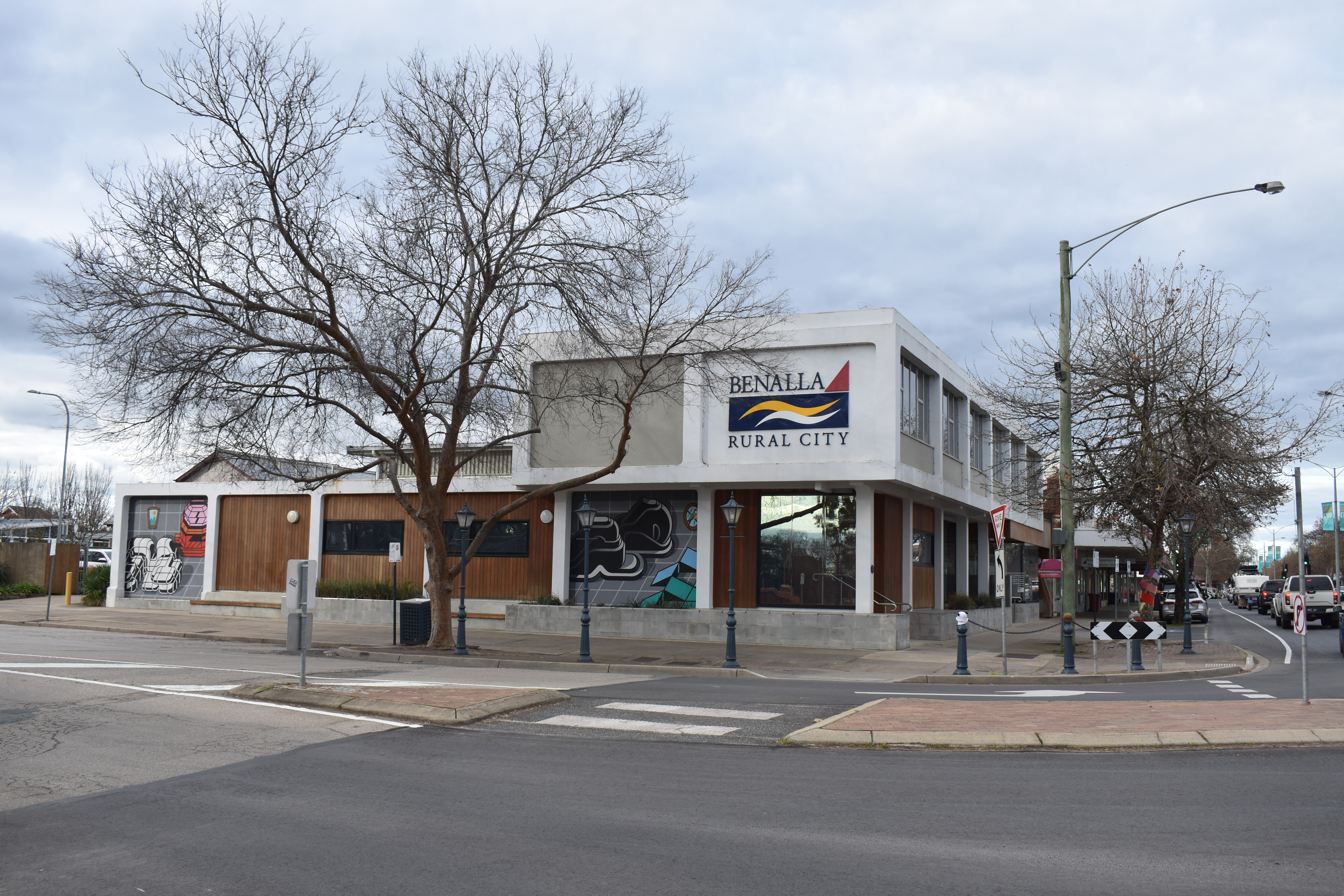
The Rural City is headquartered on the main street of Benalla.

The council meets in the council chambers at the council headquarters in the Benalla Municipal Offices, which is also the location of the council's administrative activities. It also provides customer services at its administrative centre in Benalla.

== Townships and localities ==
The 2021 census, the rural city had a population of 14,528 up from 13,861 in the 2016 census

Population
Locality	2016	2021
Archerton	17	16
Baddaginnie^	338	347
Benalla	10,330	10,822
Boho South^	77	93
Boweya^	41	51
Boxwood^	20	19
Bridge Creek^	97	117
Broken Creek	39	45
Bungeet	31	29
Bungeet West	45	44
Chesney Vale	157	204
Creek Junction^	16	34
Devenish	197	208
Glenrowan^	963	1,049
Glenrowan West	62	75
Goomalibee	83	91
Goorambat	297	269
Lima	79	92
Lima East	151	165
Lima South	99	142
Lurg	225	220
Major Plains^	37	36
Molyullah	131	160
Moorngag	96	75
Mount Bruno	54	47
Samaria	57	57
Stewarton^	116	118
Swanpool	207	227
Taminick	103	139
Tarnook	89	103
Tatong	287	281
Thoona	127	133
Upper Lurg	121	107
Upper Ryans Creek	39	40
Warrenbayne	145	144
Winton	108	103
Winton North	7	8

^ - Territory divided with another LGA

== See also ==
- List of localities (Victoria)
- List of places on the Victorian Heritage Register in the Rural City of Benalla
