= Devenish, Victoria =

Devenish
- Town
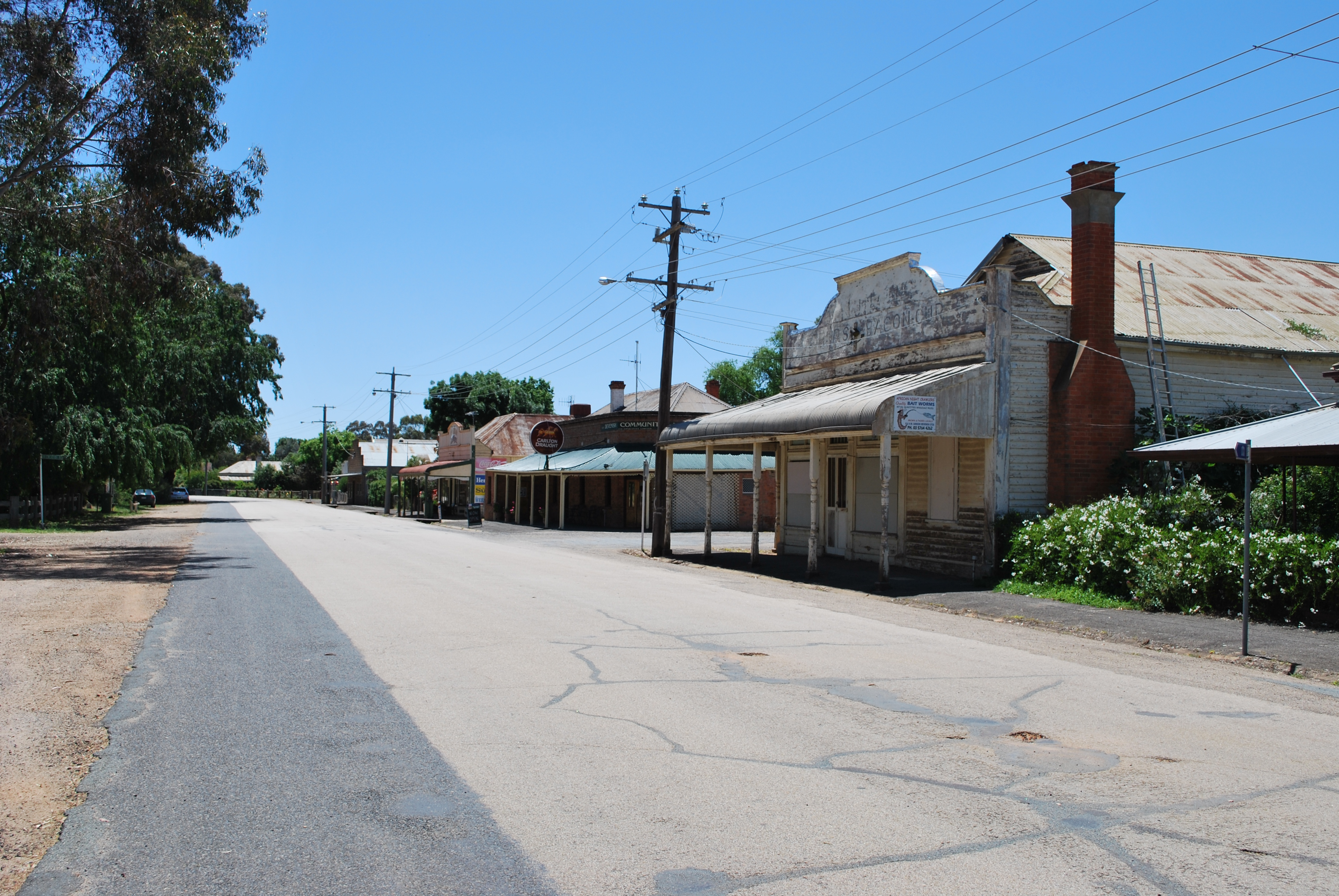
- Main street

- Interactive map of Devenish
- Coordinates: 36°20′0″S 145°54′0″E
- Country: Australia
- State: Victoria
- Region: Hume
- LGA: Rural City of Benalla
- Location: 230 km (140 mi) N of Melbourne; 63 km (39 mi) W of Wangaratta; 29 km (18 mi) NW of Benalla; 20 km (12 mi) E of Dookie

Government
  - State electorate: Euroa
  - Federal division: Indi

Population
  - Total: 197 (2016 census)
- Postcode: 3726

Devenish is a town in northern Victoria, Australia within the Rural City of Benalla local government area, 230 kilometres (143 mi) north of the state capital, Melbourne. At the 2011 census, Devenish and the surrounding area had a population of 360, declining to 197 by 2016.

== History ==
The Post Office opened on 9 June 1877 as Broken Creek and was renamed Devenish in 1878. In 1883 on the arrival of the railway, the office was moved and named Devenish Railway Station, reverting to Devenish in about 1889 as the township developed. An earlier office dating from 1870, Major Plains, was known as Devenish from 1874 until 1878.

The general store, then known as the Farmers' Exchange, was sold by Mr. R. Lidgerwood to Mr. F. Woods in February 1919.

The Devenish concrete grain silos were built between the railway line and the main street and opened to receive wheat in December 1943. Later the Bulk Oat storage building was built in 1965.

In 2023, Devenish Primary School had just one student enrolled at the school.

== Religion ==
The first Roman Catholic Church was built in Devenish in 1883 at number 959 Devenish Road. It was decommissioned in 2005 and put up for sale.

== Balloons ==
The Australian hot air balloon championships were held in Devenish in 2007.

== Transport ==
Devenish used to have a railway station with 2 wheat silos that are still there but decommissioned on the Oaklands railway line, Victoria. V/line operates 3 coach services (weekdays) and 2 coach services (weekends) 7 days a week from Benalla to Yarrawonga. The coach service stops at Devenish along the way, and connects to V/line train services to/from Melbourne (Southern Cross) at Benalla Station.

== Sport ==
The town had an Australian Rules football team that formed in the early 1890s, initially competing in the Benalla- Yarrawonga Line Association, and later in the Benalla & District Football League until the league folded due to lack of players. Premierships were won in the years 1902 and 1909, then again in 1914, 1922, 1929, 2003 & 2005.
