= Thoona =

- Town
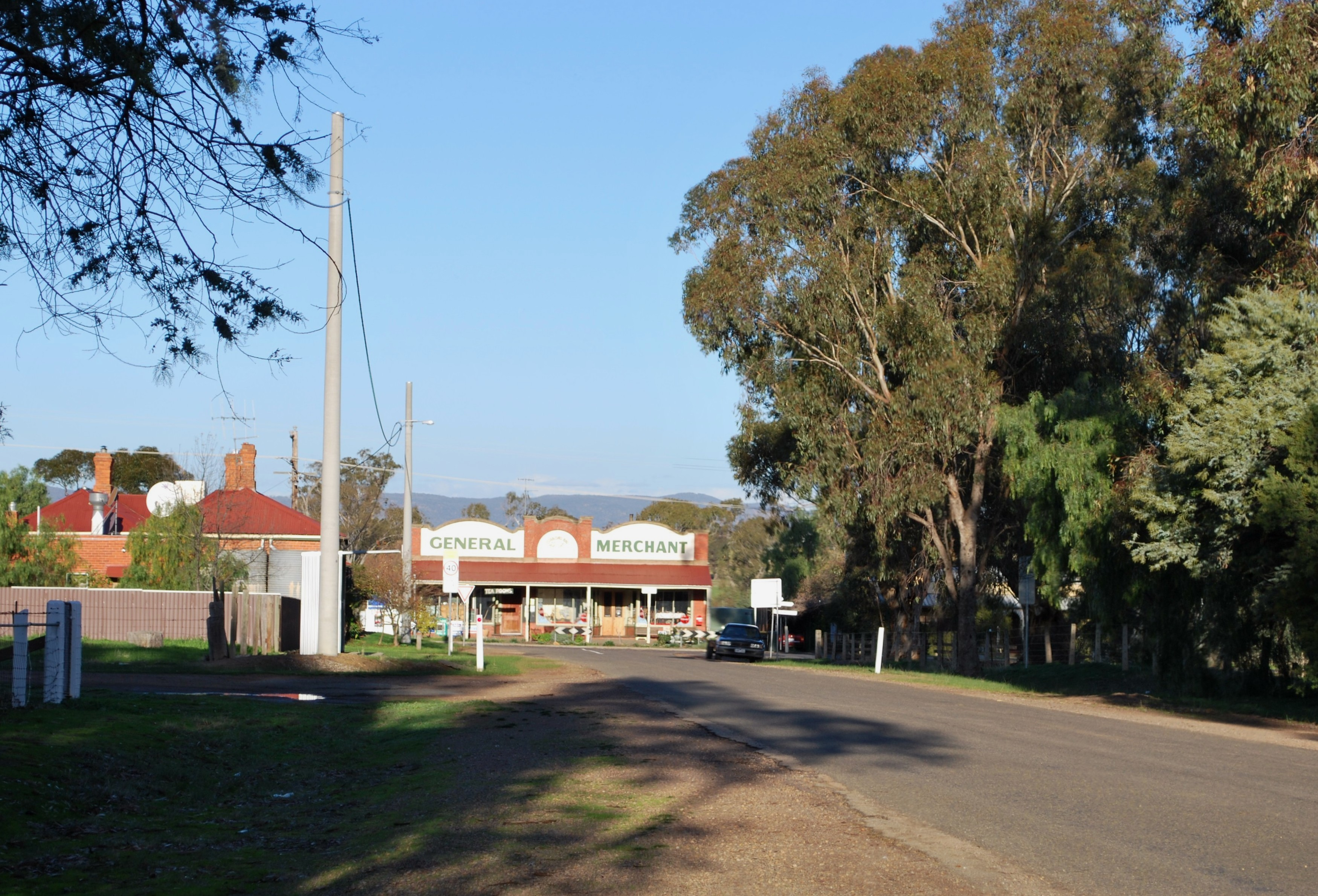
- Entering Thoona from the west

- Coordinates: 36°20′0″S 146°05′0″E
- Country: Australia
- State: Victoria
- Region: Hume
- LGA: Rural City of Benalla
- Location: 247 km (153 mi) NE of Melbourne; 30 km (19 mi) W of Wangaratta; 28 km (17 mi) N of Benalla

Government
  - State electorate: Euroa
  - Federal division: Indi

Population
  - Total: 127 (2016 census)
- Postcode: 3726

Thoona is a town in north-eastern Victoria, Australia. The town is in the Rural City of Benalla local government area, 247 kilometres (153 mi) north east of the state capital Melbourne. At the 2006 census, Thoona and the surrounding area had a population of 474 dropping to just 127 ten years later.

Thoona Post Office opened on 18 August 1882. Thoona Primary School closed in 2015.

The town itself is located on the edge of a small hill and the word Thoona is Aboriginal for “small hill”, also. The Warby Ranges are around 5 kilometres (3 mi) east. Thoona was home to the first co-operative butter factory in north-east Victoria. In March each year Thoona hosts the Victorian Wheelie Bin championships. A documentary on the event was made in 2001.
