= Molyullah =

- Town
- Coordinates: 36°38′38″S 146°09′23″E
- Country: Australia
- State: Victoria
- Region: Hume
- LGA: Rural City of Benalla
- Location: 235 km (146 mi) NE of Melbourne; 22 km (14 mi) SE of Benalla

Government
  - State electorate: Euroa
  - Federal division: Indi
- Elevation: 220 m (720 ft)

Population
  - Total: 131 (2016 census)
- Postcode: 3673

Molyullah is a locality in north-eastern Victoria, Australia. The locality is part of the Rural City of Benalla local government area.

Molyullah is well known for its Easter sports which are held every year.
