= Steph Ryan =

Australian politician

Steph Ryan MP

Deputy Leader of the National Party in Victoria
- In office 3 December 2014 – 6 July 2022
- Leader: Peter Walsh
- Preceded by: Peter Walsh
- Succeeded by: Emma Kealy

Member of the Victorian Legislative Assembly for Euroa
- In office 29 November 2014 – 26 November 2022
- Preceded by: Electorate established
- Succeeded by: Annabelle Cleeland

Personal details
- Born: Stephanie Maureen Ryan; 20 June 1986 (age 40) Murchison, Victoria, Australia
- Party: National
- Spouse: Simon Huggins (m. 2016)
- Children: 1
- Education: RMIT University
- Occupation: Journalist; Media advisor; Politician
- Website: www.stephryan.com.au

Stephanie Maureen Ryan (born 20 June 1986) is a former Australian politician. She was a National Party member of the Victorian Legislative Assembly from 2014 to 2022, representing the Legislative Assembly seat of Euroa.

During her time as member of parliament, Ryan also served as the deputy leader of the party from November 2014 to July 2022.

== Early career ==
Prior to her election to Parliament, Ryan previously worked as a journalist and political adviser to various state MPs including Liberal Premier Ted Baillieu and members of the Victorian Nationals' leadership team, prior to her own election.

== Political career ==
On 3 December 2014, Ryan was elected as deputy leader of the Nationals in the Victorian Parliament. On 17 December, she was made Shadow Minister for Training, Skills and Apprenticeships and Shadow Minister for Young Victorians. Following the 2018 election Ryan was given the portfolios of Water, Public Transport (Regional), Gaming and Liquor Regulation.

After her election to Victorian Parliament in 2014, the Nationals party room immediately elected Ryan to the deputy leadership, becoming the first woman in the Victorian Nationals to hold a parliamentary leadership position.

In 2016 the Victorian Coroner returned a controversial closed case verdict in the tragic death of Phoebe Handsjuk, which led Ryan to use her parliamentary platform to call for the Attorney-General to reopen the inquiry into Handsjuk's death due to community concern around the management of the inquiry. Ryan headed calls to broaden the rights of appeal, in line with the wishes of Handsjuk's family, who believed an open finding was necessary.

At the 2018 Victorian election which saw the Andrews Government retain power with an increased majority, Ryan was just one of a handful of Coalition MPs returned with a positive swing, contrary to the swing away from the Coalition in the majority of the state.

Ryan was outed in 2019 as one of three Nationals MPs who had appointed family members to taxpayer-funded jobs in their electorate offices, having employed her mother on a casual basis at taxpayer expense between 2014 and 2018.

Liberal MP Wendy Lovell castigated Ryan in a private WhatsApp group for Victorian Coalition MPs, for engaging in "low tactics" and "hypocrisy" in mid-2021 after revelations emerged that the Nationals had engaged in the unlawful practice of cybersquatting on domain names using the name of Independent Mildura MP Ali Cupper, which sought to redirect internet users to a National Party website containing negative material about Cupper. Ryan denied that there was anything low about cybersquatting. Cupper, meanwhile, said that her constituents were not impressed by the games and distractions which the Nationals had engaged in.

In the aftermath of Barnaby Joyce returning as federal Nationals leader and deputy prime minister, Ryan and Victorian party leader, Peter Walsh, expressed concern about the change, given Joyce's lack of commitment to action on climate change. Ryan consistently advocated for a more ambitious climate change target at a federal level before a net zero position was adopted, calling on her federal colleagues to follow the Victorian Nationals' greener position on climate change. It subsequently emerged that the Victorian Nationals' leadership sought disaffiliation from the Federal Nationals in protest at the lack of climate change policy, but the state party's management board rejected the motion.

Ryan also expressed frustration that Victorian Nationals Senator Bridget McKenzie had voted for Joyce's return to the leadership and had won promotion to Cabinet at the expense of Gippsland MP Darren Chester, despite McKenzie's promotion resulting in a new record being set for the number of women in an Australian federal cabinet.

In her role as Shadow Minister for Liquor and Gaming, Ryan successfully pressured the Andrews Government into a Royal Commission to investigate the behaviour of Crown Casino, which uncovered a range of poor behaviour by the casino operator, despite the government limiting the scope of the inquiry.

Ryan called for improved regional infrastructure, including roads and public transport as well as greater access to health services, in particular mental health.

In July 2022 Ryan announced she was resigning from the deputy leadership and her shadow ministerial positions, while pregnant with her second child. She stated that she would also not recontest the upcoming election, citing family and a more flexible employment as reasons for her retirement. Emma Kealy took over her position of Deputy Leader.

== Personal life ==
In 2016 Ryan married her long-term partner, former Australian Labor Party City of Yarra Councillor Simon Huggins. According to Ryan, it took her more than three years of asking before Huggins agreed to go out with her. The relationship attracted much interest in the media, given Ryan's status as deputy leader of Victoria's oldest anti-Labor political party and Huggins being a member of the Labor Left and strident advocate for LGBTI issues.

Ryan is a distant relative of Ned Kelly and of former National Party federal president, John Tanner.

Victorian Legislative Assembly
New seat	Member for Euroa; 2014–2022	Succeeded by Annabelle Cleeland
Party political offices
Preceded by Peter Walsh	Deputy Leader of the National Party in Victoria; 2014–2022	Succeeded by Emma Kealy
