= Annabelle Cleeland =

Australian politician

Annabelle Cleeland MP
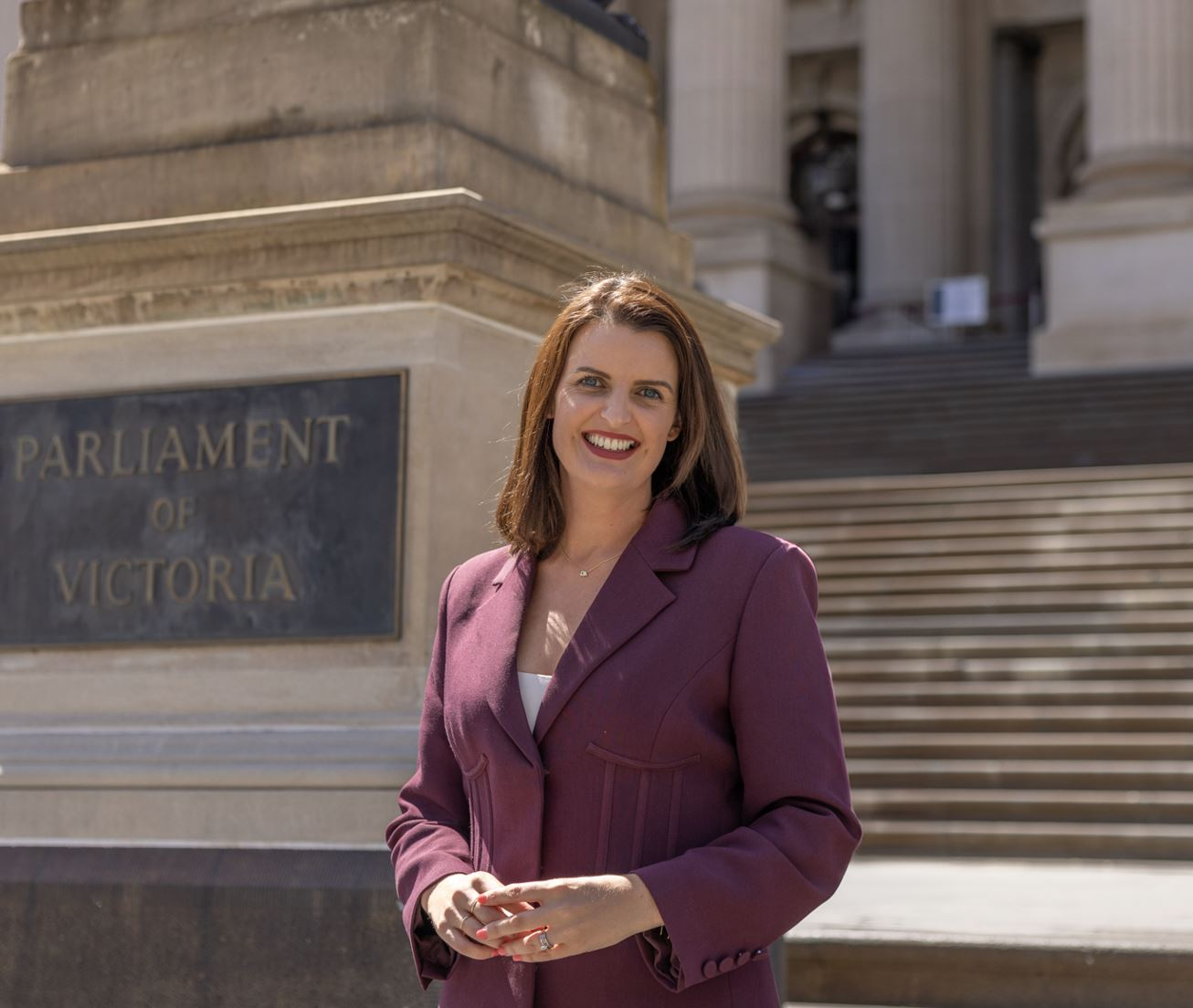

Member of the Victorian Legislative Assembly for Euroa
- Incumbent
- Assumed office 26 November 2022
- Preceded by: Steph Ryan

Personal details
- Political party: National

Annabelle Cleeland is an Australian politician who is the current member for the district of Euroa in the Victorian Legislative Assembly. She is a member of the Nationals and was elected in the 2022 state election, replacing retiring MLA Steph Ryan.

She has been the Shadow Assistant Minister for Health since January 2025.

Prior to entering politics, Cleeland had served as a national agricultural journalist and editor for Fairfax Media and Stock & Land.

Victorian Legislative Assembly
Preceded by Steph Ryan	Member for Euroa; 2022–present	Incumbent
