= 1997 Victorian local elections =

- 16 March 1997

	First party	Second party	Third party
	IND
Leader	N/A	N/A	N/A
Party	Independents	Labor	Liberal

The 1997 Victorian local elections were held on 16 March 1997 to elect the councils of a number of the 78 local government areas in Victoria, Australia.

== Background ==
For a number of LGAs, the elections were the first since significant reform was introduced by the Kennett state government in 1994. The reforms dissolved 210 councils and sacked 1600 elected councillors, and created 78 new councils through amalgamations. In suburban Melbourne, 53 municipalities were reduced to 26.
