= Violet Town =

Town in north Victoria, Australia

- Town
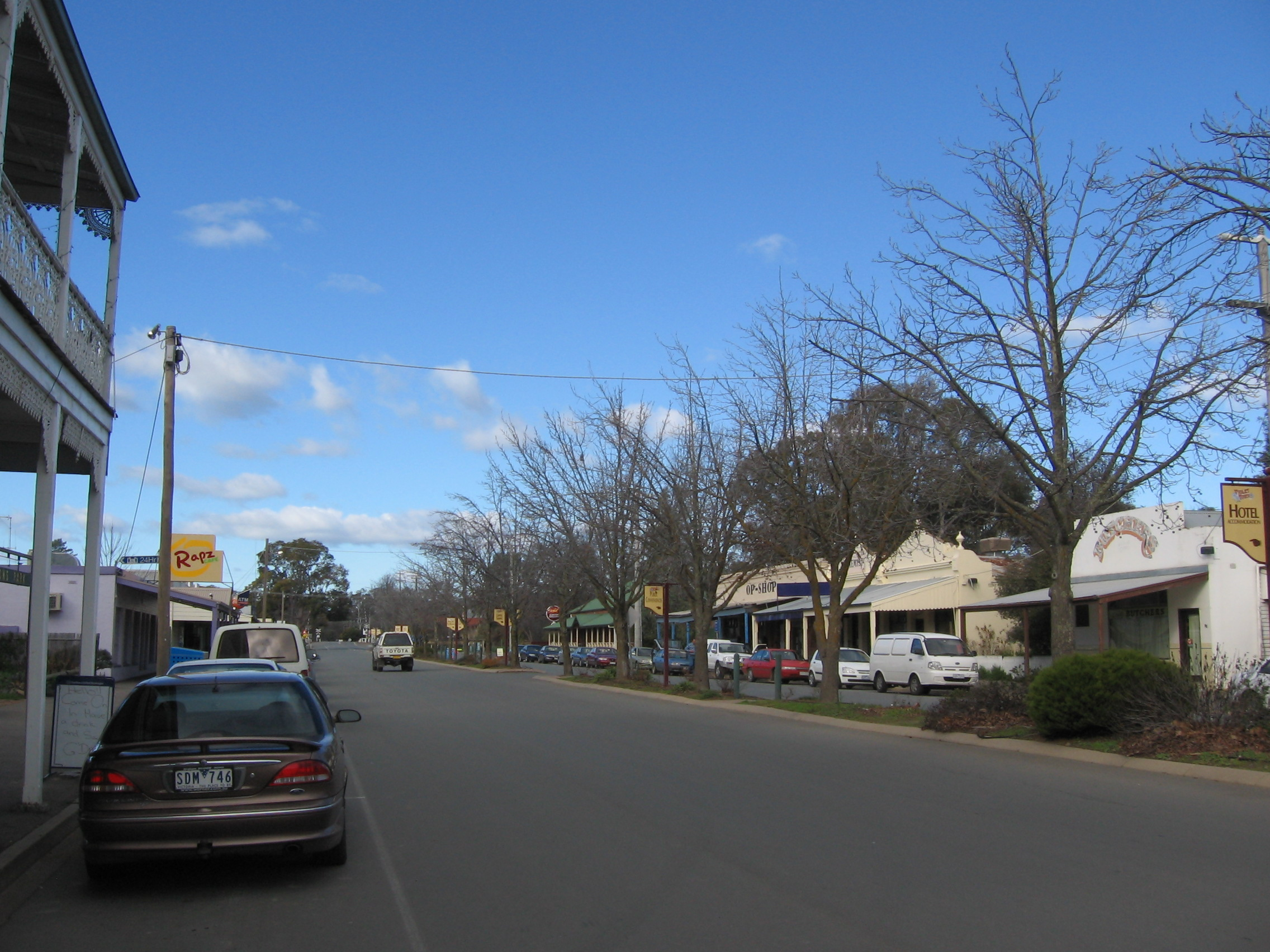
- Cowslip Street

- Interactive map of Violet Town
- Coordinates: 36°38′0″S 145°44′0″E
- Country: Australia
- State: Victoria
- Region: Hume
- LGA: Shire of Strathbogie
- Location: 174 km (108 mi) N of Melbourne; 19 km (12 mi) N of Euroa; 27 km (17 mi) SW of Benalla

Government
  - State electorate: Euroa
  - Federal divisions: Indi; Nicholls

Population
  - Total: 936 (2021 census)
- Postcode: 3669

Violet Town is a town in northeastern Victoria, Australia. The town is in the Shire of Strathbogie local government area, 174 kilometres (108 mi) northeast of the state capital, Melbourne on the Hume Highway. At the 2021 census, Violet Town had a population of 936.

The town is on Honeysuckle Creek and has many early streets named after flowers, e.g. Lily Street, Rose Street, Orchid Street, Tulip Street, and Iris Lane.

== History ==
The Yorta Yorta are the traditional custodians of this land.

In 1838 the New South Wales Government surveyed the town site which they called "Violet Creek" — the first inland surveyed town in Victoria. The following year land was put up for sale. Squatters took up land at Honeysuckle Run soon after. The town remained empty in spite of the sale of town blocks until 1846 when the Royal Mail Hotel was opened and then a village began to grow. By the 1860s the town had expanded to include three hotels, a bakery and a school. Buildings went from bark huts to timber construction. Its principal thoroughfares then were Hyacinth, Tulip, Cowslip, and Rose streets. The town was an important coach stop on the Melbourne to Sydney road, as it was at the conjunction of the Sydney road, the overland telegraph and the tracks to Bendigo and the north-eastern gold fields. In 1873 the railway arrived and the village moved closer to the line. In 1895 the Shire of Violet Town was gazetted. In 1994 it was amalgamated with adjoining shires to become part of the Shire of Strathbogie.

With its proximity to the Honeysuckle Creek, development in Tulip Street began early with the first surveyed block in Victoria, on the corner of Rose and Tulip Streets. The first hotel was in this site precinct and the first designated crossing of the Honeysuckle Creek was on Baird Street.

Until 1980, the Sydney Road/Hume Highway ran through Violet Town, and much early history is centred on this road, now called High Street. Major Thomas Mitchell and his party stopped on the banks of Violet Creek, now called Honeysuckle Creek on his way back to Sydney. In this Australia Felix exploration of 1836 he noted that the swamps and marshes in the area had a profusion of wild violets and named the district Violet Ponds. The explorers Hume and Hovell also camped near this spot (6.4 km away) in 1824. Some existing houses and cottages in High Street, previously used as tea rooms or coaching inns, date from the 1880s.

Cowslip Street is the main commercial street of Violet Town. It developed after the railway arrived. However, many of the early buildings were made of timber and burnt down. There are two strips of shops surviving from the end of the 19th century, plus some single buildings worth visiting.

The Post Office opened on 1 July 1852 although closed from early 1854 until early 1859.

Near the town was the site of the Southern Aurora train crash in 1969 that caused the deaths of nine people.

Violet Town Magistrates' Court closed in 1977.

On 12 November 2003 the Victorian State Government announced plans to locate a toxic waste dump in the district, and threatened to acquire local farming properties. In 2004 the residents of the town and district successfully campaigned against the proposal.

The local history group holds a library of photos.

=== Military history ===
Violet Town was represented in the Anglo-Boer War (1899-1901) and the town's war memorial in Cowslip Street was built in 1901.

The town has both a World War I Avenue of Honour (Cowslip Street) and a World War II Avenue of Honour (Hyacinth Street) maintained by the local RSL branch.

During World War II, Violet Town was the location of RAAF No.13 Inland Aircraft Fuel Depot (IAFD), commissioned in 1942 and closed on 14 June 1944. Usually consisting of 4 tanks, 31 fuel depots were built across Australia for the storage and supply of aircraft fuel for the Royal Australian Air Force and the United States Army Air Forces at a total cost of £900,000 ($1,800,000)

== Today ==
The town's streets are tree-lined and uncongested by traffic. The town has public reserves, with a bowling green, football and cricket oval, tennis courts and a caravan park near Honeysuckle Creek. There is also a memorial hall, swimming pool, library, museum and several art galleries. The Strathbogie Ranges are visible to the south.

Violet Town holds a Community Market on the 2nd Saturday of every month at the Recreation Reserve in Tulip Street - it has been going since 1978 and features local producers. Volunteers make pizza in the community wood fired pizza oven.

The town has a range of local businesses including agricultural store, cafes, hotel, chemist, hairdresser, supermarket and petrol station, and is surrounded by rural land used mainly for cropping and cattle and sheep grazing, although some horse studs are present. The town's Bush Nursing Centre provides residential aged care for up to 64 people. Murrnong is a permaculture farm and training facility.

Some features of the area include the Honeysuckle Creek Walking Track, Shadforth Reserve with community forest (originally a racecourse), the community built Violet Town Swimming Pool and the local Peranbin primary school.

Violet Town has connections with Australian rock music - during the 1980s a song by The Church was named for the town, and more recently the town has been known for being the home of Jesse and Ella Hooper, members of rock band Killing Heidi. Their best known single Weir was written about the local railway reservoir weir.

Violet Town is one of few small rural towns (population under 1000) that has shown growth. The town's population in 2016 was 684.

Violet Town Football Netball Club plays Australian Rules football and netball in the Kyabram District Football Netball League.

== Transport ==
Road access to town is via the Melbourne to Sydney Hume Freeway or through the Violet Town-Murchison Road from the west (from Bendigo), or the Nalinga/Dookie Road from the north.

The passenger railway station is serviced by daily V/Line services between Melbourne and Albury.
