= County of Delatite =

Coordinates: 36°50′S 146°15′E

Delatite
- Cadastral division
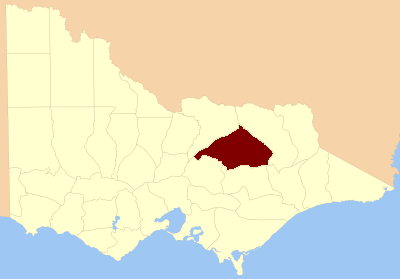
- Location in Victoria
- Country: Australia
- State: Victoria
- Established: 24 February 1871

Area
  - Total: 8,392 km^{2} (3,240 sq mi)
Lands administrative divisions around Delatite
Moira	Bogong	Bogong
Moira	Delatite	Bogong
Anglesey	Wonnangatta	Dargo

The County of Delatite is one of the 37 counties of Victoria which are part of the cadastral divisions of Australia, used for land titles. It is located south west of Ovens River. Wangaratta is partly located in the county, at the northern end.

== Parishes ==
Parishes within the county:

- Avenel, Victoria
- Barwite, Victoria
- Beolite, Victoria
- Boho, Victoria
- Borodomanin, Victoria
- Brankeet, Victoria
- Buckland, Victoria
- Bungamero, Victoria
- Cambatong, Victoria
- Carboor, Victoria
- Coolumbooka, Victoria
- Coolungubra, Victoria
- Delatite, Victoria
- Dondangadale, Victoria
- Doolam, Victoria
- Dueran, Victoria
- Dueran East, Victoria
- Edi, Victoria
- Eurandelong, Victoria
- Garratanbunell, Victoria
- Gonzaga, Victoria
- Gooramgooramgong, Victoria
- Greta, Victoria
- Kelfeera, Victoria
- Koonika, Victoria
- Laceby, Victoria
- Lima, Victoria
- Loyola, Victoria
- Lurg, Victoria
- Maharatta, Victoria
- Maindample, Victoria
- Mansfield, Victoria
- Marraweeny, Victoria
- Matong, Victoria
- Matong North, Victoria
- Merrijig, Victoria
- Mirimbah, Victoria
- Monea South, Victoria
- Moorngag, Victoria
- Morockdong, Victoria
- Moyhu, Victoria
- Myrrhee, Victoria
- Nillahcootie, Victoria
- Oxley, Victoria
- Panbulla, Victoria
- Rothesay, Victoria
- Ruffy, Victoria
- Samaria, Victoria
- Strathbogie, Victoria
- Tallangallook, Victoria
- Tarcombe, Victoria
- Tatong, Victoria
- Toombullup, Victoria
- Toombullup North, Victoria
- Too-rour, Victoria
- Towamba, Victoria
- Wabonga, Victoria
- Wabonga South, Victoria
- Wallagoot, Victoria
- Wandiligong, Victoria
- Wappan, Victoria
- Whitfield, Victoria
- Whitfield South, Victoria
- Whorouly, Victoria
- Winteriga, Victoria
- Wondoomarook, Victoria
- Youpella, Victoria
