= Warrenbayne =

- Town
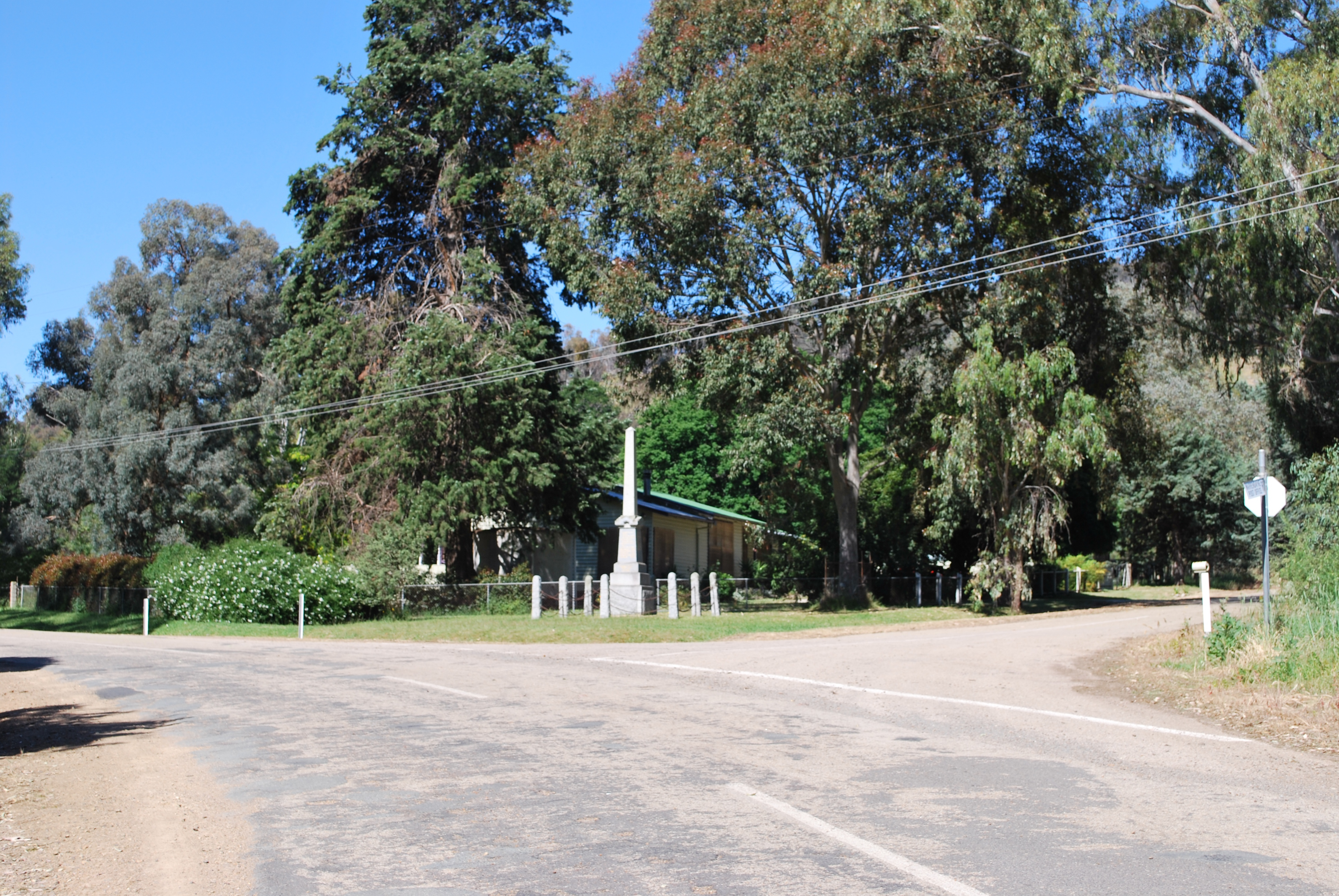
- War memorial at Warrenbayne

- Coordinates: 36°42′0″S 145°53′0″E
- Country: Australia
- State: Victoria
- Region: Hume
- LGA: Rural City of Benalla
- Location: 208 km (129 mi) NE of Melbourne; 77 km (48 mi) SE of Shepparton; 21 km (13 mi) SE of Benalla

Government
  - State electorate: Euroa
  - Federal division: Indi

Population
  - Total: 145 (2016 census)
- Postcode: 3670

Warrenbayne is a locality in north-eastern Victoria, Australia. The locality, part of the Rural City of Benalla local government area, is 208 kilometres (129 mi) north east of the state capital, Melbourne.

Warrenbayne was home to a state primary school, Warrenbayne Primary School, until its closure in 2008 due to declining enrolments.
