= Electoral district of Euroa =

State electoral district of Victoria, Australia

Coordinates: 36.86°S 145.25°E

Euroa Victoria—Legislative Assembly
- Interactive map of electoral district boundaries from the 2022 state election
- State: Victoria
- Created: 2014
- MP: Annabelle Cleeland
- Party: The Nationals
- Namesake: Euroa
- Electors: 49,251 (2018)
- Area: 11,452 km^{2} (4,421.6 sq mi)
- Demographic: Rural
Electorates around Euroa:
| Murray Plains | Shepparton | Ovens Valley |
| Bendigo East | Euroa | Ovens Valley |
| Macedon | Kalkallo; Yan Yean | Eildon |

The electoral district of Euroa is an electoral district of the Victorian Legislative Assembly in Australia. It was created in the redistribution of electoral boundaries in 2013.

It was a new district created due to the abolition of the districts of Seymour, Rodney and Benalla, taking in the areas to the north of these districts toward Shepparton. It includes the towns of Benalla, Violet Town, Euroa, Seymour, Heathcote, Nagambie, Rushworth and other towns in the Campaspe, Strathbogie, Benalla and Mitchell local government areas.

After its formation, Euroa was classed as a safe Nationals seat, with a margin of 13.6%. In the 2014 state election, the first election at which the seat was contested, Stephanie Ryan won it for the Nationals, picking up an estimated swing in her favour, even as the Victorian Coalition lost government.

== Members ==
| Member | Party | Term |
|---|---|---|
| Stephanie Ryan | The Nationals | 2014–2022 |
| Annabelle Cleeland | The Nationals | 2022–present |

== Election results ==
2022 Victorian state election: Euroa
| Party | Candidate | Votes | % | ±% |
|---|---|---|---|---|
| National | Annabelle Cleeland | 13,496 | 32.0 | −27.4 |
| Labor | Angela Tough | 12,840 | 30.4 | +2.3 |
| Liberal | Brad Hearn | 9,227 | 21.8 | +21.8 |
| Greens | James Bennett | 2,245 | 5.3 | +0.1 |
| Freedom | Raymond Mark Rowbotham | 1,770 | 4.2 | +4.2 |
| Family First | Paul Bachelor | 1,494 | 3.5 | +3.5 |
| Animal Justice | Elaine Haddock | 1,170 | 2.8 | +2.8 |
| Total formal votes | | 42,242 | 94.6 | +0.0 |
| Informal votes | | 2,431 | 5.4 | −0.0 |
| Turnout | | 44,673 | 88.2 | +0.6 |
Two-party-preferred result
| National | Annabelle Cleeland | 25,316 | 59.9 | −5.4 |
| Labor | Angela Tough | 16,926 | 40.1 | +5.4 |
| National hold | | Swing | −5.4 | |

Two-party-preferred vote results in Euroa View source data.
