= Division of Indi =

Australian federal electoral division

Coordinates: 36.640°S 146.633°E

Indi Australian House of Representatives Division
- Interactive map of electorate boundaries from the 2025 federal election
- Created: 1901
- MP: Helen Haines
- Party: Independent
- Namesake: Murray River (Aboriginal name)
- Electors: 120,854 (2025)
- Area: 29,188 km^{2} (11,269.5 sq mi)
- Demographic: Rural

The Division of Indi (/ˈɪndaɪ/ IN-dye) is an Australian electoral division in the state of Victoria. The division is located in the north-east of the state, adjoining the border with New South Wales. Between 1922 and 1937, the division also covered the outskirts of eastern Melbourne and the Yarra Valley.

As of 2025, it covers the entire local government areas of Shire of Murrindindi, Shire of Mansfield, Alpine Shire, Shire of Towong. Shire of Indigo, City of Wodonga, Rural City of Wangaratta, City of Benalla, and the eastern half of Shire of Strathbogie. The largest settlements in the division are the regional cities of Wodonga, Wangaratta, and Benalla. While Indi is one of the largest electorates in Victoria, much of it is located within the largely uninhabited Australian Alps. While Wodonga serves as a regional hub for much of the more heavily populated northern part of the electorate, the southern part is closer to Melbourne than Wodonga.

The current member for Indi, since the 2019 federal election, is independent Helen Haines.

== Geography ==
Since 1984, federal electoral division boundaries in Australia have been determined at redistributions by a redistribution committee appointed by the Australian Electoral Commission. Redistributions occur for the boundaries of divisions in a particular state, and they occur every seven years, or sooner if a state's representation entitlement changes or when divisions of a state are malapportioned.

When the division was created in 1900, it covered the north-east of the state near the New South Wales border and along the Hume Highway. It included the towns of Wangaratta, Wodonga, Bright and Mount Hotham. In 1906, it expanded towards the south-west to include Benalla and Mansfield. In 1913, it expanded further southwards and gained Yea, Alexandra and Eildon from the abolished Division of Mernda. In 1922, it expanded further southwards and gained significant areas from the Division of Flinders. It extended up to the outskirts of Melbourne and included Croydon, Ringwood, Dandenong Ranges and the Yarra Valley.

In 1936, most of the areas it gained in 1913 and 1922 were lost to the new Division of Deakin. However, the division was instead expanded west to include Shepparton and Yarrawonga due to the abolition of Echuca. In 1949, this was also largely reversed with the creation of the new Division of Murray from much of Indi's northwest portion, though Indi retained Euroa and Violet Town. Also in the same redistribution, the division expanded southwards again and regained Yea, Alexandra and Mansfield from the Division of Deakin. The division then remained largely similar with minor boundary changes until 1984.

In 1984, the division lost its southern half and was significantly cut back to Benalla, with the areas lost becoming part of the new Division of McEwen, named after a former member for Indi John McEwen. Since 1984, the division gradually took back majority of these lost areas from McEwen or other divisions, such as Mansfield in 2003, Yea, Alexandra and Eildon in 2010, and Euroa and Violet Town in 2018. Indi had previously taken back Euroa and Violet Town in 1994, but lost them to the Division of Murray in 2010.

As of the 2024 redistribution, it covers the entire local government areas of Shire of Murrindindi, Shire of Mansfield, Alpine Shire, Shire of Towong. Shire of Indigo, City of Wodonga, Rural City of Wangaratta, City of Benalla, and the eastern half of Shire of Strathbogie. It includes the regional cities of Wodonga, Wangaratta, and Benalla. It also includes the towns of Rutherglen, Mansfield, Beechworth, Myrtleford, Bright, Alexandra, Tallangatta, Corryong and a number of other small villages. It also includes a number of ski resorts, such as Mount Buller, Mount Hotham and Falls Creek.

== History ==
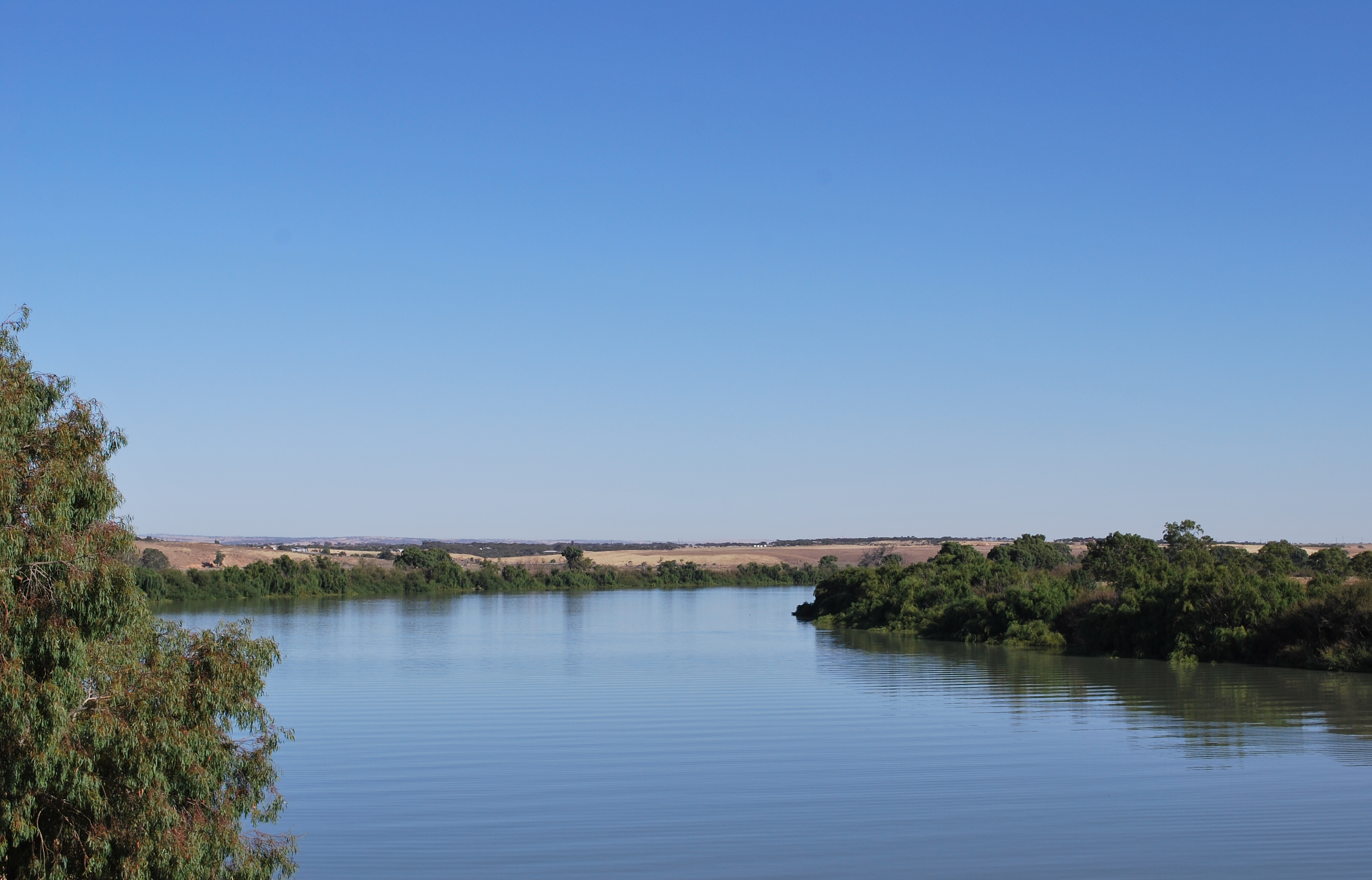
The Murray River, the Aboriginal name of which is the division's namesake

Indi has existed continuously since Federation. The division was proclaimed in 1900, and was one of the original 65 divisions contested at the first federal election. The most nationally prominent person to have represented Indi was the first, Sir Isaac Isaacs, who rose to become Attorney-General of Australia, Chief Justice of the High Court of Australia, and the first Australian-born Governor-General of Australia. Another member for Indi, John McEwen, transferred to Indi after Echuca was largely merged into it in 1937 and served as member for Indi for 12 years, before following most of the electors in Indi's northwestern portion into Murray in 1949. McEwen served on the Coalition frontbench without interruption from 1937 to his retirement in 1971 and would later be briefly Prime Minister of Australia after the death of Harold Holt in 1967.

Indi has been held by a member of a conservative party (either the Liberal Party and its predecessors or the National Party) for all but four terms from Federation to 2013, and without interruption from 1931 to 2013. Labor last won the seat in 1928 when the Country incumbent forgot to renominate, and retained the seat in 1929. Since 2004, the Liberal primary vote has been in decline, falling from 63% in 2004, to 54% in 2007, 53% in 2010, 44% in 2013 and 27% in 2016. In 2019, the Liberal primary vote rose slightly to 35% before falling again, in 2022, to 31%.

For the better part of 80 years, Indi was a fairly safe to safe seat for the Coalition. This ended at the 2013 election, when agricultural consultant and independent candidate Cathy McGowan unseated Liberal Party incumbent Sophie Mirabella, the only incumbent Liberal MP to lose their seat at that election. It was considered a major upset on several counts. Not only did the Coalition win a decisive victory nationally, but Mirabella had won the previous election with a two-party-preferred vote of almost 60 percent, on the stronger side of fairly safe (and within a few hundred votes of being safe).

McGowan retained Indi against Mirabella at the 2016 election, with an increased 54.8% (+4.6) two-candidate-preferred vote. The Liberal margin in a "traditional" two-party contest was reduced to 54.4% (–4.7) against Labor's 45.6% (+4.7), a marginal two-party-preferred result not seen since the 1929 election.

McGowan retired in 2019 and was succeeded by fellow independent Helen Haines, who incurred a swing of four percent to the Liberals, compared with McGowan's 2016 vote, and was elected on Labor preferences.

== Members ==
Image	Member	Party	Term	Notes
	Isaac Isaacs (1855–1948)	Protectionist	29 March 1901 – 12 October 1906	Previously held the Victorian Legislative Assembly seat of Bogong. Served as minister under Deakin. Resigned to become a Justice of the High Court
	Joseph Brown (1844–1925)	Anti-Socialist	12 December 1906 – 26 May 1909	Previously held the Victorian Legislative Assembly seat of Shepparton and Euroa. Lost seat
	Joseph Brown (1844–1925)	Liberal	26 May 1909 – 13 April 1910	Previously held the Victorian Legislative Assembly seat of Shepparton and Euroa. Lost seat
	Parker Moloney (1879–1961)	Labor	13 April 1910 – 31 May 1913	Lost seat
	Cornelius Ahern (1871–1955)	Liberal	31 May 1913 – 5 September 1914	Lost seat
	Parker Moloney (1879–1961)	Labor	5 September 1914 – 5 May 1917	Lost seat. Later elected to the division of Hume in 1919
	John Leckie (1872–1947)	Nationalist	5 May 1917 – 13 December 1919	Previously held the Victorian Legislative Assembly seat of Benambra. Lost seat. Later elected to the Senate in 1934
	Robert Cook (1867–1930)	Victorian Farmers' Union	13 December 1919 – 22 January 1920	Did not contest in 1928 after mistakenly failing to lodge renomination papers in time
	Robert Cook (1867–1930)	Country	22 January 1920 – 9 October 1928	Did not contest in 1928 after mistakenly failing to lodge renomination papers in time
	Paul Jones (1878–1972)	Labor	17 November 1928 – 19 December 1931	Lost seat. Later elected to the Victorian Legislative Council in 1937
	William Hutchinson (1904–1967)	United Australia	19 December 1931 – 23 October 1937	Transferred to the Division of Deakin
	John McEwen (1900–1980)	Country	23 October 1937 – 10 December 1949	Previously held the Division of Echuca. Served as minister under Lyons, Page, Menzies and Fadden. Transferred to the Division of Murray
	William Bostock (1892–1968)	Liberal	10 December 1949 – 22 November 1958	Lost seat
	Mac Holten (1922–1996)	Country	22 November 1958 – 2 May 1975	Served as minister under Gorton and McMahon. Lost seat
	Mac Holten (1922–1996)	National Country	2 May 1975 – 10 December 1977	Served as minister under Gorton and McMahon. Lost seat
	Ewen Cameron (1930–)	Liberal	10 December 1977 – 8 February 1993	Retired
	Lou Lieberman (1938–2024)	Liberal	13 March 1993 – 8 October 2001	Previously held the Victorian Legislative Assembly seat of Benambra. Retired
	Sophie Mirabella (1968–)	Liberal	10 November 2001 – 7 September 2013	Lost seat
	Cathy McGowan (1953–)	Independent	7 September 2013 – 11 April 2019	Retired
	Helen Haines (1961–)	Independent	18 May 2019 – present	Incumbent

== Election results ==
2025 Australian federal election: Indi
Party	Candidate	Votes	%	±%
Independent	Helen Haines	44,723	42.29	+1.61
Liberal	James Trenery	32,475	30.71	+0.19
Labor	Mitch Bridges	8,824	8.34	−0.25
One Nation	Athol Thomas	7,611	7.20	+1.92
Greens	Alysia Regan	3,839	3.63	+0.06
Legalise Cannabis	Ben Howman	3,163	2.99	+2.99
Family First	Michael White	1,901	1.80	+1.80
Libertarian	Tim Quilty	1,705	1.61	−0.65
Independent	Mark McFarlane	1,520	1.44	+1.44
Total formal votes		105,761	94.40	−0.13
Informal votes		6,279	5.60	+0.13
Turnout		112,040	92.77	+3.79
Notional two-party-preferred count
Liberal	James Trenery	59,925	56.66	+1.40
Labor	Mitch Bridges	45,836	43.34	−1.40
Two-candidate-preferred result
Independent	Helen Haines	62,014	58.64	−0.30
Liberal	James Trenery	43,747	41.36	+0.30
Independent hold		Swing	−0.30	
