= List of localities in Victoria =

Map of Local Government Areas in Victoria

This is a list of locality names and populated place names in the state of Victoria, Australia, outside the Melbourne metropolitan area. It is organised by region from the south-west of the state to the east and, for convenience, is sectioned by Local Government Area (LGA). Localities are bounded areas recorded on VICNAMES (the Register of Geographic Names), although boundaries are the responsibility of each council. Many localities cross LGA boundaries, some being partly within three LGAs, but are listed here once under the LGA in which the major population centre or area occurs.

The Registrar of Geographic Names, supported by Geographic Names Victoria (GNV), administers the naming or renaming of localities (as well as roads, and other geographic features) in Victoria, and maintains the Register of Geographic Names, referred as VICNAMES, pursuant to the Geographic Place Names Act 1998. GNV has issued the mandatory Naming rules for places in Victoria, Statutory requirements for naming roads, features and localities – 2022 (naming rules), and which are based on international, national standards and policies in naming of such places. Detailed maps showing locality boundaries within a LGA are available on the Land Use Victoria website.

== Introduction ==
Although the names of localities may in some cases be the same as parishes (surveyed cadastral divisions), their boundaries often differ. For instance the locality of Tyrendarra contains part of the parish of Narrawong to the west of the Fitzroy River, due to the township being established on the western border of the parish and postal services etc.to that area being supplied from Tyrendarra (the first two subscribers to the telephone service in 1925 were resident in the parish of Narrawong). The locality of Tyrendarra East also lies within the parish.

Bracketed behind locality names are the names of official neighbourhoods (unbounded areas listed by the Registrar of Geographic Names) that lie generally within the locality. The locality of Ouyen contains eighteen neighbourhoods, five of which once had a railway station and fourteen of which once had a post office. The amalgamation of farm properties, the consequent reduced population, closure of postal and railway facilities has led to the amalgamation of erstwhile localities, although those living there would not consider themselves to be living in Ouyen and their mail would still be addressed accordingly. In contrast, those living in the neighbourhood of Narrawong East would all give their address as Tyrendarra. The reason for the existence of the named neighbourhood was the State School (now closed) of the same name, nearer to Tyrendarra township than the Tyrendarra school, but within Narrawong parish and named accordingly. This is borne out by the official coordinates being those of the school. Neighbourhoods, with geographic coordinates, can be found through the Land Use Victoria via the VICNAMES Register.

Also bracketed are earlier names (or alternative official spellings or style) for a locality; few names have changed once established but Boggy Creek, Muddy Creek and Cannibal Creek gained more respectable names when a township was surveyed. The removal of the possessive apostrophe in place names is not recorded, but the more recent possessive to adjectival changes are (Darlot's Creek became Darlots Creek and later Darlot Creek).

Names from the extended postcode (mail destination) list are included. When the new Australian postcode system was introduced in Victoria in 1967 all mail destinations were assigned postcodes based on the mail routing. Many localities share postcodes with nearby localities; some named localities have two or three different postcodes because different mail routes traversed their area. Postcodes were assigned outside the (then) metropolitan area along radial lines from Melbourne, from towards the south-west to towards the south-east numbered from 3211 to 3996 in a clockwise direction.

The names of all Post Offices/Receiving Offices (PO/RO), Telegraph/Telephone Offices (TO) open at any time in Victoria have been recorded by Phoenix Auctions History and where the location is accurately known, and where the name of the office is not simply the surname of the operator of the facility, its name has been included.

For (linked) localities with Wikipedia articles further information on the bracketed names may be expected within the articles. For those lacking articles the range of years the locality (or a bracketed area) had a post, telegraph or telephone office are recorded as an approximation of the establishment of the locality as a populated entity, and as some indication of its life as a viable community.

All names italicised have never had a post or telegraph office open under the exact name (apostrophisation excluded).

== Shire of Glenelg ==
38°00′00″S 141°40′00″E Allestree • Bahgallah (1878–1977) • Bolwarra (1902–1907 see Allestree) • Breakaway Creek (1937–1963 see Condah) • Brimboal (1873–1957) • Cape Bridgewater (Bridgewater Lower, Lower Cape Bridgewater) • Carapook (?–?) • Cashmore (1913–1973 Cashmore Heath) • Casterton (The Glenelg) • Condah (Condah Swamp) • Corndale (Heath Field) • Dartmoor (Woodford Inn) • Digby (1858– Myaring, Rifle Downs) • Drik Drik (1872–1971) • Drumborg (1889–1957 Sinclair, West Sinclair) • Dunrobin (1912–1967) • Dutton Way (see Portland) • Gorae (1904–1975) • Gorae West (1913–1957 Curries) • Grassdale (1885–1969 Miakite) • Greenwald (1884–1971 Greenwald East) • Heathmere (1936–1969 Heathmere Siding) • Henty (Wurt Wurt Koort) • Heywood (Fitzroy Crossing, Edgar's) • Homerton (1903–1919) • Hotspur (1860–1971) • Killara (1914–1918 Mocamboro) • Lake Condah (Condah Mission, Condah South -see Condah) • Lake Mundi (1877–1976 Tullich) • Lindsay (1849–1871 Munro's Inn, Border Post) • Lyons (1889–1971 Glenaulin, Lower Crawford) • Merino (Talisker) • Milltown (1891–1974) • Mount Eckersley • Mount Richmond (1892–1976 Kentbruck, Mount Richmond South, Tarragal) • Mumbannar (1887–1971 Marp, Rennicks, Wanwin) • Myamyn (1875–1971) • Nangeela (1911–1957 Nelangie) • Narrawong • Nelson (Discovery Bay, Mouzie, Wade Junction) • Paschendale (1921–1948) • Portland (Portland South, Portland Junction) • Portland North (1904–1974 see Portland) • Portland West (1902–1970 Cape Nelson, Trewalla see Portland) • Sandford (Moredun) • Strathdownie (1877–1977 Ardno, Kaladbro, Lockinon, Malanganee, Myaring Bridge, Puralka, Strathdownie East, Strathdownie West, Wilkin) • Tahara (C1871–1965) (Tahara North) • Tahara Bridge (1902–1960) • Tahara West (1914–1968) • Tyrendarra (Mount Clay, Narrawong East) • Wallacedale (1899–1975) (Wallacedale North) • Wando Bridge (1922–1965) • Wando Vale (1901–1957 Wando Dale) • Warrock (Roseneath) • Winnap (1915–1971 Camp Corner, Drik Drik North)

== Shire of Moyne ==
38°22′00″S 142°14′00″E

Allansford • Ayrford (1945–1967) • Ballangeich (1868–1957 Ballangeich North) • Bessiebelle (1884–1972) • Broadwater (1878–1993 Deep Creek, Dunmore) • Caramut (Muston's Creek) • Chatsworth (1867–1977) • Codrington (1878–1976) • Crossley (1868–1971) • Cudgee (1875–1976) • Darlington (1848–1994 Elephant Bridge, Terrinalllum) • Dundonnell (1891–1969 Mount Fyans, Mount Violet) • Ellerslie (1869–1991) • Framlingham • Framlingham East (1925–1945) • Garvoc (1869– Yallook Bridge) • Gerrigerrup • Grassmere (1884–1993 Cooramook, Grassmere Junction) • Hawkesdale (Clonleigh, Hawkesdale West) • Hexham (1857–1994 Boortkoi) • Killarney (1862–1993) • Kirkstall (1865–1968) • Knebsworth (1902–1945) • Kolora (1871–1965 Wooriwyrite) • Koroit • Laang (1879–1966 Arundel) • Macarthur (Ardonachie, Donovans Lane, Moyne Falls, Ripponhurst, Weerangourt) • Mailor Flat (1881–1994 Mailor's Flat, Mailer Flat) • Mepunga (1902–1928) • Mepunga East (1889–1968) • Mepunga West (1925–1976) • Minhamite (1918–1974) • Minjah • Mortlake (Barnie Bolac, Murchs Corner) • Nareeb (Nareeb Nareeb) • Naringal • Naringal East • Nirranda (1871–1969 Delaney Corner) • Nirranda East (1902–1920) • Nirranda South (1938–1969) • Nullawarre (1879–1994) • Nullawarre North • Orford (1865–1977) • Panmure • Peterborough • Port Fairy (Belfast, Aringa, Bootahpool) • Pura Pura (1916–1966) • Purdeet (1918–1944) • Purnim • Purnim West • Rosebrook (1865–1977) • Southern Cross (1880–1969) • St Helens (1902–1967) • Taroon • Tarrone (1953–1957) • The Cove (1928–1960) • The Sisters (1899–1977 Sisters Creek) • Toolong (1926–1972 Moyne, Moyne Siding, Moyneview) • Tower Hill (1924–1968) • Tyrendarra East (1902–1975) • Wangoom (1877–1994) • Warrabkook (1902–1930 Spring Creek) • Warrong (1892–1958) • Willatook (1921–1968) • Winslow (1865–1988) • Woolsthorpe • Woorndoo (Woorndoo Upper) • Yambuk • Yarpturk (1898–1968)

== City of Warrnambool ==
38°28′00″S 142°48′00″E

Allansford (Allans Forest, Allansford Butter Factory, Lake Gillear) • Bushfield (Merri View) • Dennington (1863– ) • Illowa (1875–1996) • Warrnambool (Warrnambool South, Warrnambool East, Warrnambool North, Warrnambool West, Warrnambool West Reserve, Hopkins Point, Hopkins River, Hopkins View, Merri Vale, Russell's Creek, Spring Gardens) • Woodford (Malones) • Yangery (1865–1968)

== Shire of Southern Grampians ==
37°31′00″S 142°02′00″E

Balmoral • Bochara (1927–1957 Nigretta) • Branxholme (Ardachy, Morven) • Brit Brit (1923–1971) • Buckley Swamp • Bulart (1912–1946 Kyup, The Anchorage, Mooralla Estate, Parkwood) • Byaduk (Neukirch) • Byaduk North (1882–1969 see Byaduk) • Carapook (1868–1968 Carrapook, Amblerton, Clifford) • Cavendish (Mona Park) • Cherrypool (1915–1963) • Clover Flat (1923–1975 Muntham) • Coleraine • Coojar (1924–1953) • Croxton East (1868–1959) • Culla (1902–1952 Moree, Mooree) • Dunkeld (Mount Sturgeon) • Englefield (1924–1959) • Gatum (1883–1971 Gatum Gatum, Parkside) • Gazette (1954–1957) • Glenisla (1902–1969 Glenisla Crossing, Hynes) • Glenthompson (Strathmore, Yuppeekiar) • Grampians (Big Cord, Strachans) • Gringegalgona (1921–1975 The Gums) • Gritjurk (1902–1954 Gritjurk North, Gritjurk South) • Hamilton (Grangeburn, The Grange, Hamilton North, Pedrina Park) • Hensley Park (1928–1962 Kanawalla) • Hilgay (1924–1956) • Karabeal (1872–1949) • Konongwootong (1916–1957 Konongwootong North) • Melville Forest (1923–1975) • Mirranatwa (1882–1952) • Mooralla (1891–1966 Lambruck) • Morgiana (1953–1966) • Mount Napier • Moutajup (1872–1975) • Muntham (1915–1923 see Clover Flat) • Nareen (1870–1974 Wando Dale, Wando Heights) • Penshurst (Penshurst South, Mount Rouse, Purdeet East) • Pigeon Ponds (1911–1958) • Rocklands (1902–1966 Woohlpooer, Rocklands Dam, Fergusons, Glendinning) • Strathkellar (1909–1993) • Tabor (Croxton East Railway Station) • Tarrayoukyan (1878–1959) • Tarrenlea (1922–1936 Winninburn) • Tarrington (Hochkirch) • Vasey (1923–1971) (Cadden Flat) • Victoria Point • Victoria Valley (1873–1968) • Wannon (1861–1982) • Warrayure • Woodhouse • Wootong Vale (1923–1964) • Yatchaw (1915–1964) • Yulecart (1908–1957)

== Rural City of Ararat ==
37°17′00″S 142°55′00″E

Ararat (Canton Lead, Cathcart, Warra Yadin, Ararat East) • Armstrong (Armstrong's) • Ballyrogan (1875–1930 Challicum) • Bayindeen (1892–1975) • Bornes Hill • Buangor (1863–1994 Buangor East) • Cathcart (1859–1946 and see Ararat) • Denicull Creek (1874–1931) • Dobie (1862–1972 Dobies Bridge, Dobies, Jacksons Creek) • Dunneworthy • Elmhurst (1865–1993) • Eversley (1858–1920) • Glenlogie • Lake Bolac (Mellier) • Langi Logan (1877–1970 Ardara, Jackson's Creek, Wirri Wirri, Westgarth, Langi Logan South) • Mafeking (1900–1958 Jimmy Creek) • Maroona (1872–2000 Maroona West) • Middle Creek (1881–1971) • Mininera (1913– Mininera East) • Mount Cole (1865–1975 Ben Nevis) • Mount Cole Creek (1907–1962) • Moyston (Barton, Campbell's Reef, Jallukar, Londonderry) • Narrapumelap South • Nerrin Nerrin (1913–1994) • Norval (1870–1946 Opossum Gully) • Pomonal (Pomona, Mona, Mount William) • Rhymney (1875–1957 Rhymney Reef) • Rocky Point (1920–1952) • Rossbridge (1873–1962 Ross Bridge) • Stavely (1909–1969) • Streatham (Fiery Creek) • Tatyoon (1867–1994 Tatyoon North, Tatyoon Railway, Kiora) • Warrak (1879–1975) • Westmere, Victoria (1913–1993) • Wickliffe ( Berrambool, Narrapumelap) • Willaura (Brennan, Talkadorno, Watgania, Buninjon, Lake Buninjon, Calvert, Yarram Park) • Willaura North (1872–1883 Kalymna, Kia Ora)

== Shire of Northern Grampians ==
36°39′00″S 143°01′00″E

Avon Plains (1862–1976) • Banyena (1875–1976 Banyena South) • Barkly (1861–1981 Navarre Rush) • Beazleys Bridge (1881–1973) • Bellellen (1902–1925) • Bellfield (Bellfield Settlement) • Black Range • Bolangum (1928) • Bulgana • Callawadda (1873–1979 Callawadda South, Bismarck, Bismark, Nyallo) • Campbells Bridge (1885–1975) • Carapooee (1858–1970) • Carapooee West (1902–1969) • Concongella (1867–1868 Concongella Creek) • Coonooer West (1881–1952 Conover West, Lowe's) • Cope Cope (1873–1975) • Dalyenong • Darkbonee (1902–1950) • Deep Lead (1859–1973 Welshmans Flat) • Elberton (1902–1919 Campbell's Creek State School) • Emu (1920–1977) • Fyans Creek (1884–1965) • Germania • Glenorchy (1849– Four Posts Inn, Wimmera) • Gooroc (1876–1960) • Gowar East (1859–1973) • Grays Bridge • Gre Gre (1872–1969 Gre Gre Central, Gre Gre Village, John Bull Creek) • Gre Gre North (1891–1959) • Gre Gre South (1925–1969) • Great Western (Salt Creek, Garden Gully) • Greens Creek (1868–1965) • Halls Gap (Borough Huts, Grampians Junction) • Illawarra (1910–1965) • Joel Joel • Joel South (1916–1965) • Kanya (1891–1975) • Kooreh (1878–1969 Kooreh South, Kooroc) • Lake Fyans • Lake Lonsdale (1902–1929) • Landsborough West (1916–1968 Woodlands North) • Ledcourt (1869–1880 Heatherlie) • Marnoo • Marnoo East (1924–1930 Pilgrim's) • Marnoo West • Mitchells Hill (1879–1943) • Mokepilly • Moolerr (1902–1929 Mooleer, Darcys Bridge) • Morrl Morrl (1902–1974) • Mount Dryden (1888–1894 Grampian Quarries) • Moyreisk (1886–1970 Moyreisk North, Cherry Tree Creek, Cherry Tree) • Natte Yallock (1867–1993) • Navarre • Paradise (1891–1966) • Riachella • Rich Avon East • Rich Avon West (1905–1927) • Roses Gap • Rostron (1890–1973 Winjallock, Winjallok North) • Shays Flat (1867–1993) • Slaty Creek (1881–1944) • St Arnaud (Medlyn, St Arnaud East, View Point, Western Creek) • St Arnaud North (1885–1971) • Stawell (Bridge Inn, Pleasant Creek, -Quartz Reef, Pleasant Creek-, -Quartz Reef, Stawell-, Stawell West) • Stuart Mill (Stuartmill) • Sutherland (1883–1963 Sutherland's Plains) • Swanwater (1883–1963) • Swanwater West (1881–1951) • Tottington (1891–1916 Coorah) • Traynors Lagoon (1877–1972 Mitchell's Hill) • Tulkara • Wal Wal (1887–1981 Paynes Pool, Warranook) • Wallaloo (1888–1926) • Wallaloo East (1902–1978) • Wattle Creek (1906–1954) • Winjallok (1902–1973 Darling Flat, Flagstaff Hut) • York Plains • Zumsteins (1922–1922 Flat Rock, Flat Rock Crossing, Burrong North, Cranage)

== Rural City of Horsham ==
36°42′00″S 142°12′00″E

Arapiles • Blackheath (1886–1961 Youngvale) • Brimpaen (1886–1957) • Bungalally (1888–1927 Burnt Creek, Green Lake, Green Lakes) • Clear Lake (1878–1977 Carchap, Jalumba, Merriville) • Dadswells Bridge • Dooen (Greenland Dam) • Drung (1872–1960 Drung Drung, Lewyn, Drung Drung South) • Duchembegarra (1912–1932 Duchembegara North, Wyn Wyn) • Grass Flat (1911–1927) • Haven • Horsham (Horsham West) • Jilpanger • Jung (1879–1994 Jung Jung, Jung Jung North, Jung North, Jerro) • Kalkee (1877–1960 Garup) • Kanagulk (1882–1956 Jeffries, Telangatuk) • Laharum (Lah-Arum) • Longerenong (1865–1958 Boningup) • Lower Norton (1902–1974 Lower Norton Creek) • McKenzie Creek (1890–1976) • Mitre (1887–1981 Mitre Lake, Mitre Lake South) • Mockinya (1911–1963) • Mount Talbot • Murra Warra (1877–1963 Kewell West) • Natimuk (Natimuk Creek, Natimuk Lake) • Noradjuha (Lowan) • Nurrabiel (1881–1974 Connangorach) • Pimpinio (Dahlen, Pimpinio West, Polkemmet) • Quantong (1894–1973) • Riverside (1891–1953 Morrison) • St Helens Plains (1908–1957 Helens Plains, Saint Helens, Golton Golton, Golton South) • Telangatuk East (1882–1975) • Tooan (1876–1972 Tooan East) • Toolondo (1908–1977 Brooksby's) • Vectis (1883–1976 Remlaw, Vectis East, Vectis South) • Wail (1882–1975 Wail North, Wail West) • Wartook (1888–1966) • Wonwondah (1881–1952 Wonwondah East, Wonwondah North, Wonwondah South, Heathvale)

== Shire of West Wimmera ==
36°43′00″S 141°28′00″E

Apsley (Lake Wallace) • Benayeo (1882–1924 Tallageira) • Bringalbert (1888–1955 Bringalbert North, Bringalbert South) • Charam (1898–1976) • Chetwynd (1873–1996 Chetwynd East, Caupaul, Tallangower) • Connewirrecoo (1890–1965) • Dergholm (C1876- Red Cap Creek) • Dorodong (Kanawinka, Wombat Ridge) • Douglas (1886–1976 Kia Ora, St Evins) • Edenhope (Scrubby Lake) • Goroke (Bellmore, Spring Bank) • Gymbowen • Harrow (Upper Glenelg, Kalang, Kout Narin, Salt Creek) • Kadnook (1937–1940 Burke Bridge) • Kaniva (Budjik, Yarrock, Sandsmere, Yanipy) • Karnak (1886–1960 Lake Karnak, Kangawall) • Langkoop (1902–1991 Carantah, Meereek) • Lawloit (see Nhill) • Lillimur (1868–1985 Cove, Dinyarrak, Lillimur North, Lillimur South, Lockhart, Yearinga) • Miga Lake (1902–1968) • Minimay • Miram (1887–1993 Miram Piram, Miram South) • Neuarpurr (1883–1979 Neuarpur) • Nurcoung (1902–1958 Cooack, Duffholme) • Ozenkadnook (1902–1970 Dopewarra) • Patyah (1902–1957) • Peronne (1902–1978 Mortat, Booroopki, Carpolac, Morea) • Poolaijelo (1902–1978 Poolaigelo) • Powers Creek (1889–1980 Bogolara) • Serviceton (Leeor, Serviceton North, Serviceton South) • Telopea Downs (1962–1973) • Ullswater (1904–1947 Awonga) • Wombelano (1887–1976 Mullagh)

== Shire of Hindmarsh ==
36°08′00″S 141°39′00″E

Albacutya (1911–1932 Lake Albacutya) • Antwerp (Antwerp North) • Broughton (1888–1937 Deakin) • Dimboola (Nine Creeks, Arkona, Katyil, Katyil West, Dart Dart, Kornheim, Edolsfield) • Gerang Gerung (1887–1988) • Glenlee (1890–1916 Ni Ni, Ni Ni East, Woorak) • Jeparit (Allanby, Dalmallee, Detpa, Ellam, Hounsells, Westerns, Peppers Plain, Pullut, Tullyvea) • Kenmare (1896–1979) • Kiata (1880–1975 Kiata East, Kiata North, Kiata South, Kiata West) • Lake Hindmarsh (see Jeparit) • Little Desert • Lorquon (1883–1971) • Netherby (Baker, Lorquon West, Perenna) • Nhill (Balrootan, Balrootan North, Boyeo, Diapur, Diapur Town, Kanimakatka, Kinimakatka, Mount Elgin, Ni Ni Well, Propodollah, Salisbury, Tarranginnie, Haycroft, Tarranginnie East, Bleak House, Winiam, Winiam East, Woorak West) • Rainbow (Rainbow Rise, Pella, Pijick, Werrap, Wheatlands) • Tarranyurk (1891–2001 Polacks Corner, see Antwerp) • Yanac (1884–2000 Yanac A Yanac, Yanac North, Yanac South)

== Shire of Yarriambiack ==
36°15′00″S 142°25′00″E

Areegra • Aubrey (1887–1933 Cannum North) • Bangerang (1888–1947 Bangerang North, Banjerang, Homecroft, Nyam, Nyamville) • Beulah (Beulah East, Beulah West, Brentwood, Norwegian, Galaquil, Galaquil East, Kerewichip, Kurdweechee) • Boolite (1890–1951) • Brim (1890– Brim East) • Cannum (1881–1930 Cannum East, Cannum South) • Crymelon (1902–1963 Angip, Yellangip North) • Hopetoun (Albacutya, Burroin, Dattuck, Hopetoun West, Hopevale, Goyura) • Kellalac (1877–1955 Ailsa) • Kewell (1874–1963 Kewell East, Kewell North, Byrneville, Byrneville State School) • Laen (1877–1943) • Lah (1891–1971 Yellanghip, Yellangip, Yellangip East) • Lascelles (Minapre, Gama) • Lubeck (1879–1989) • Minyip (Brooklet, Kircheim, Nullan, Dunmunkle East) • Murtoa (Coromby, Ashens, Jung Jung South, Shanty Corner) • Patchewollock (Baring, Dering, Patchewollock North) • Rosebery (1884–1974 Rosebery East, Rosebery West) • Rupanyup (Karkarooc, Burrum, Lallat, Lallat Plains, Burrereo, Raluana, Rupanyup North, Wirchilleba, Rupanyup South) • Sheep Hills (1875–1981 Kinloch, Tarkedia, Kingumwill) • Speed • Turriff (1907–1977 Turriff West) • Wallup (1892–1977 Wallup East) • Warracknabeal (Werracknebeal, Batchica, Mellis, Challambra, Challamba, Challamba Dam) • Wilkur (1904–1957 Beyal, Cameron's, Wilkur South) • Willenabrina • Woomelang (Mount Pleasant, Mount Richards) • Wyperfield National Park • Yaapeet (1912– Turkey Bottom, Nypo)

== Shire of Buloke ==
36°00′00″S 142°59′16″E

Ballapur • Banyan • Barrakee (1883–1973 Barrakee North, Hallam) • Berriwillock • Bimbourie (Bimbourne, Daytrap Corner) • Birchip (Wirrimbirchip) • Birchip West • Boigbeat • Buckrabanyule (Hallam) • Bunguluke (1875–1942 Bungeluke, Bungeluke North, Bungeluke West, Bungeluke, Fairview, Tyrrell Creek) • Carron (1881–1949) • Charlton (Charlton East, Yowen Hill) • Chirrip (1890–1964 Chirrup) • Cokum • Coonooer Bridge (Conover) • Corack (1877–1954) • Corack East (1891–1976) • Culgoa (Kaneira) • Curyo (1900–1976) • Donald (Mount Jeffcott, Dairy Farm, Lake Buloke, Buloke) • Dooboobetic (Doboobetic) • Dumosa (Black Gate) • Gil Gil • Glenloth • Glenloth East • Granite Flat • Jeffcott • Jeffcott North (1880–1930 Banyenong, Mount Jeffcott North) • Jeruk (1880–1930) • Jil Jil (1888–1943 Marlbed, Reseigh) • Kalpienung • Karyrie (1892–1919) • Kinnabulla (1902–1973) • Laen East • Laen North (1881–1919) • Lake Tyrrell • Lawler (1910–1930 Kendle) • Litchfield (1877–1979 Witchipool) • Marlbed (1888–1911 see Jil Jil) • Massey (1885–1954) • Morton Plains (1864–1931) • Myall (1891–1965) • Nandaly • Nareewillock (1881–1942 Narrewillock) • Narraport (1879–1968) • Ninda • Nullawil • Nyarrin • Pier Milan (1911–1971 Pier-Millan, Pier Millan) • Reedy Dam (1902–1929) • Rich Avon • Sea Lake • Springfield (1902–1940 Springfield Station, Rolighed) • Straten (1923–1952 Stratton, Speed East) • Sutton • Teddywaddy (1881–1973) • Teddywaddy West • Thalia (1892–1969) • Tittybong • Towaninny (Towaninnie) • Towaninny South • Turriff East (1918–1940) • Tyrrell (1902–1940 Tyrrell West, Long Plains) • Tyrrell Downs (1898–1927) • Warmur (1905–1930 Warmur West) • Warne • Watchem • Watchem West • Watchupga (1900–1972 Watcheupga) • Whirily (1912–1913) • Willangie (1905–1931 Lenrich) • Wooroonook (1877–1958 Wooroonooke) • Woosang (1879–1940) • Wycheproof (Moffat, Mount Wycheproof) • Wycheproof South • Yawong Hills (1875–1942 Yawong) • Yeungroon (1893–1933) • Yeungroon East (1902–1933)

== Rural City of Mildura ==
34°23′20″S 141°36′00″E

Big Desert (S1914–1962 Kurnbrunin, Wrathall, Yarto, Waggon Flat) • Birdwoodton • Boinka • Cabarita (Lake Hawthorn) • Cardross • Carina (Mulcra) • Carwarp (Boonoonar, Ginquam, Ginquam South, Nowingi, Yatpool, Yatpool West) • Colignan • Cowangie (Bunurouk, Bunurouk West, Cowangie North, Daalko, Koonoa, Kow Plains, Pallarang) • Cullulleraine (Kulnine East) • Hattah • Iraak • Irymple (Billabong, Irymple South) • Koorlong (Benetook, Thurla) • Kulwin (Lietpar) • Lindsay Point • Linga (Manpy) • Merbein • Merbein South • Merbein West • Meringur (Karween, Meringur North, Morkalla, Morkalla North, Tunart) • Merrinee (Merrinee North, Pirlta, Tarrango, Willah) • Mildura (Mildura East, Mildura South, Mildura West) • Mittyack (Rownack) • Murray-Sunset (Raak Plain) • Murrayville (Duddo, Duddo Wells, Danyo, Goongee, Gunamalary) • Nangiloc • Neds Corner (Kulnine, Lock 9) • Nichols Point • Ouyen (Galah, Galah North, Nulkwyne, Tiega, Timberoo, Timberoo South, Wymlet, Trinita, Kiamal, Cramerton, Boulka, Bronzewing, Nunga, Gypsum, Gypsum Siding, Boorongie, Boorongie North, Wagant) • Panitya (Berrook, Boltons, Boltons Bore, Manya, Manya North, Ngallo, Panitya East, Sunset) • Red Cliffs (Karadoc, Stewart) • Tempy (Tempy East) • Torrita (Gunner, Kattyong, Nyang) • Tutye (Tyalla) • Underbool (Gnarr) • Walpeup (Paigne) • Wargan (Boy Creek, Upper Kulnine) • Werrimull (Bambill, Bambill South, Cowan's Tank, Karawinna, Karawinna North, Koleya, Kurnwill, Yarrara, Yarrara North) • Yelta (Cowanna Bend, Redgrove)

== Rural City of Swan Hill ==
35°03′00″S 142°55′00″E

Annuello (Koimbo, Margooya) • Bannerton (Banner) • Beverford • Bolton • Boundary Bend (Tinaro Creek) • Bulga (1905–1953) • Castle Donnington • Chillingollah (Chillingollah East) • Chinangin • Chinkapook (Christmas Tank) • Cocamba • Fish Point • Gerahmin (Daytrap, Day Trap, Day Trap North) • Goschen (Lalbert Road) • Gowanford (Ganeit) • Happy Valley • Kenley (1923–1967 Piambie) • Kooloonong (Koorkab) • Kunat (Kooem) • Lake Boga • Lake Powell (1918–1952 Belsar Island, Kyndalyn, Narrung West, Youngeira, Yungera) • Liparoo • Manangatang (Larundel, Leepi, Prooinga) • Meatian • Miralie (1925–1925) • Murnungin • Murrawee (1921–1947) • Murraydale (1916–1969) • Narrung (1902–1969) • Natya (Haysdale, Spinifex) • Nowie (Nowie North, Nowie South) • Nyah • Nyah West • Nyrraby (1902–1931 Rynaby, Yarraby Tank, Yarraby) • Pental Island • Piangil (Piangil North, Tudor, Kalma, Coonimur, Piangil West) • Pira • Polisbet • Robinvale (Bumbong, Robinvale South) • Speewa • Swan Hill (Swan Hill North, Swan Hill Folk Museum, Swan Hill Pioneer Settlement) • Swan Hill West • Tol Tol (Latten's Bend) • Towan (1915–1962) • Tresco • Tresco West (S1923–1925 see Tresco) • Turoar (1919–1942) • Tyntynder (Tyntynder Central see Nyah) • Tyntynder South (1902–1969) • Ultima (Fourteen Mile Plain, Mumbel Plains) • Ultima East • Vinifera (Tyntynder West) • Waitchie • Wandown • Wemen • Winlaton (S1927–1944) • Winnambool (1928–1942 Tyseley, Piccadilly Corner) • Wood Wood (1900–1987) • Woorinen (R1915–1993) • Woorinen North (S1921–1976 Dorrington) • Woorinen South (McNaughton's)

== Shire of Gannawarra ==
35°43′00″S 143°55′00″E

Appin (1885–1956 Violet Bank) • Appin Park (1960– ) • Bael Bael (1902–1919) • Beauchamp (1902–1944 Korrak Korrak) • Benjeroop (1883–1967) • Budgerum East (1921–1922) • Burkes Bridge • Cannie (1905–1976) • Capels Crossing (1879–1946) • Cohuna (Mologa, Cohuna Township) • Cullen (1884–1941, see Cohuna) • Daltons Bridge • Dingwall (1890–1969 Langville, Murphy's Lake, Sunnydale) • Fairley (1890–1960 Reedy Lake) • Gannawarra (1878–1955 Gannawarrah, Gannawarra North) • Gonn Crossing (1912–1969) • Gredgwin (1912–1977) • Horfield (1923–1948) • Kangaroo Lake • Keely (1919–1949 Keely Rail) • Kerang (Pyramid Creek, Yeoburn, Yeoburn East) • Kerang East (1887–1957) • Koondrook (Culfearne) • Koroop (1879–1971 Pooles) • Lake Charm (1878– Lake Charm Railway) • Lake Meran (1884–1947 Lake Meering, Meering, Meran Downs) • Lalbert (1894– ) • Leitchville (Hawkins, Mincha East, Winter Grove, Red Rise) • Macorna (R1885–1993 Glenrose, Hawkinston, Daviesholm) • Macorna North (1884–1941 Macorna South, Rowan, Rowland, Rowlands) • McMillans (1898–1959) • Mead (1910–1954 Meade) • Meering West (1908–1964) • Milnes Bridge (1902–1941) • Mincha West (1879–1931) • Murrabit • Murrabit West (1924–1969 see Murrabit) • Myall (1891–1965) • Mystic Park (1890–1978) • Ninyeunook (1878–1968) • Normanville (1900–1916) • Oakvale (1891–1954) • Pine View • Quambatook (Budgerum) • Reedy Lake (1890–1910 Reedy Lake Railway Station, see Fairley) • Sandhill Lake (1881–1953) • Teal Point (1902–1966) • Tragowel (Kerang South) • Wandella (1924–1939 Rangie) • Wee Wee Rup (1877–1953 Echunga) • Westby

== Shire of Campaspe ==
36°21′40″S 144°44′02″E

Ballendella (1906–1976) • Bamawm (1880–1974 Bamawm Central) • Bamawm Extension (1913–1969) • Bonn • Burnewang • Burramboot • Carag Carag (1891–1961) • Colbinabbin (Colbinabbin West) • Cornella (1885–1951 Cornella East) • Corop (Bonn South, Corop West, Lake Cooper) • Diggora (1876–1969 Diggora South, Diggora West, McColl, Pannoomilloo, Warragamba Creamery, Warragamba) • Echuca (Hopwoods Ferry, Hopwoods Punt, Echuca East, Echuca South, Park Gates, Kanyapella South, Simmie) • Echuca Village (1902–1951 Echuca Village Settlement) • Echuca West • Fairy Dell (1916–1971) • Girgarre (Stanhope North) • Gobarup (1902–1919 Gobarup East) • Gunbower (Kow Swamp) • Kanyapella (1882–1953, see Tongala) • Kotta (1923–1985) • Koyuga (1887–1993 Koyuga South, Blain's) • Ky Valley (1913–1955 Kyvalley) • Kyabram (Sheridan, Taripta, Kyabram East, Mount Scobie) • Lancaster (Kyabram East) • Lockington (Hunterston, Pannoobamawm) • Milloo (1878–1965) • Moora (1902–1969 Mathieson's, Moora East) • Muskerry (1901–1956 Muskerry and Weston State School, Muskerry East, Muskerry West) • Myola (1902–1950 Campaspe, Campaspe East, Myola East) • Nanneella (1878– Nanneella North, Nanneella South, Top Creek) • Patho (1892–1991 Patho South, Patho West, Picaninny Creek) • Pine Grove (1876–1962 Pine Grove East, Wanurp) • Redcastle (1860–1944) • Rochester • Roslynmead (1902–1951) • Runnymede (1867–1945 Campaspe, Creek View, Runnymeade) • Rushworth (Karook) • Stanhope (Lauderdale) • Strathallan (1913–1967) • Tennyson (1882– Pannoomilloo West, Piavella) • Terrick Terrick East (1877–1941) • Timmering (1875–1930 Timmering East, Parkes Plains) • Tongala (Tongala East, Barep) • Toolleen (1872– ) • Torrumbarry (Welton) • Wanalta (1879–1980) • Waranga Shores (1890–1935 Waranga, Waranga Basin, Waranga Outlet, Waranga Quarry) • Wharparilla (1873–1963 Wharparilla North, McEvoy's) • Wyuna (1906–1967 Hildebrand, McCoy's Bridge, Pederick, Pedericks) • Wyuna East (1909–1930) • Yambuna (1894–1976 Bundri)

== Shire of Loddon ==
36°25′06″S 143°52′00″E

Appin South (1913–1970) • Arnold (Arnold's Bridge) • Arnold West (1913–1965) • Auchmore • Barraport (1902–1972 Barrapoort) • Barraport West (1877–1950 Barrapoort, Barrapoort West) • Bealiba (1858– Cochrane's, Lower Emu) • Bears Lagoon (1878–1975 Janiember East, Murnica) • Berrimal (1887–1943 Berrimal West) • Boort (Boort West, Boort East, Verdant Vale) • Borung (1881–1993) • Brenanah (Buggins Flat, Forbes Creek Valley, Hope Creek Valley) • Bridgewater (see Bridgewater on Loddon) • Bridgewater North • Bridgewater on Loddon • Burkes Flat (1868–1967) • Calivil (1879–1982) • Campbells Forest (1876–1974 Four Winds) • Canary Island (1878–1930 Canary Island South) • Catumnal (1878–1930 Woodlands) • Cochranes Creek (1902–1941) • Derby (1877–1970) • Dingee (East Loddon) • Durham Ox (1853–1993 Hardy's Inn) • Eastville (1877–1974) • Eddington • Fentons Creek • Fernihurst (1887–1992) • Fiery Flat (1902–1952) • Gladfield (1887–1930) • Glenalbyn (1886–1973) • Inglewood (New Inglewood, Old Inglewood, Bul-a-Bul, Bullabul) • Jarklin (1874–1994) • Jungaburra • Kamarooka (1875–1980 Kamarooka East) • Kamarooka North (1885–1976) • Kingower (1854–1969 Mount Moliagul, Kooyoora) • Kinypanial (1877–1952 Kinneypaniel, Kinneypaniel South, Kinypanial South) • Korong Vale (Korongvale) • Kurraca • Kurraca West (1887–1959) • Kurting (1883–1975) • Laanecoorie (1869–1993) • Lake Marmal (1878–1959) • Leaghur (1881–1952 Sunny Vue) • Llanelly (1865–1994 Maidentown, Irish Town) • Loddon Vale (1879–1957) • Logan (Avoca Forest) • McIntyre (1857–1942 McIntyre's, Orville, Opossum Hill) • Mincha (1886–1977 Hawkins, Mincha East, Winter Grove) • Minmindie (1887–1967 Strathmore) • Mitiamo (Hayanmi, Terrick South, Terrick Terrick South) • Mologa (1881–1969 Mologa East, Central Mologa) • Murphys Creek (1902–1969) • Mysia (Calverton, Durham Downs) • Newbridge (Poseidon) • Nine Mile (1902–1956) • Painswick (1889–1995) • Pompapiel (1911–1954) • Powlett Plains (1871–1958 Loddon Rise) • Prairie (R1884–1982 Pannoomilloo Railway Station) • Pyramid Hill (Bald Rock) • Rheola (1869–1974 Berlin, Lingham's Flat) • Richmond Plains (1885–1959) • Salisbury West (1878–1971 North Salisbury, Salisbury Plains) • Serpentine (Serpentine Creek, Yarrayne) • Skinners Flat • Sylvaterre (1883–1931) • Tandarra (1877–1973 Yallook, Yallook Railway Station, Tandara Railway Crossing, Tandara) • Tarnagulla (Sandy Creek, Nuggety Gully) • Terrappee (1887–1927 Terrapee) • Terrick Terrick (1873–1931) • Terrick Terrick East (1877–1941) • Waanyarra (1856–1969 Jones' Creek, Waanyarra Rush) • Wedderburn (Kerang, Yorkshire Flat) • Wedderburn Junction (1884–1977 Wedderburn Road) • Wehla (1860–1966 Jericho) • Woodstock on Loddon (1864–1962) • Woodstock West (1877–1959) • Woolshed Flat (1857–1953 Woolshed) • Wychitella (1875–1990 Wychitella South) • Wychitella North (1902–1930) • Yando (1902–1930) • Yarraberb (1919–1954) • Yarrawalla (1877–1959 Yarrawalla South)

== City of Greater Bendigo ==
38°45′00″S 144°16′00″E

=== Suburbs of Bendigo ===
Ascot • Bendigo ( Castleton, Bendigo Creek, Sandhurst, Lansell Plaza, Tysons Reef) • Bendigo East (1915–1965) • Bendigo North (1947– ) • Bendigo West (1951–1973 Sparrowhawk) • California Gully (1864– ) • Diamond Hill (1872–1947) • Eaglehawk • Eaglehawk North • Epsom (1857– ) • Flora Hill • Golden Gully (1874–1930) • Golden Square • Ironbark • Jackass Flat • Kangaroo Flat (Kangaroo Flat South) • Kennington • Knowsley (1889–1983) • Long Gully (1857– Comet Hill) • Quarry Hill (1912– ) • Sailors Gully (1866–1875) • Sandhurst East (1952– ) • Spring Gully (1861– ) • Strathdale (1994– ) • Summerfield (1883–1965 Neilborough North) • Tysons Reef (1953–1994) • White Hills (1857–1994)

=== Towns and localities ===
Argyle (1915–1918) • Avonmore (1887–1974 South Elmore, Elmore South, May Reef, Mayreef) • Axe Creek (1930–1958 see Longlea) • Axedale • Bagshot (1883–1967) • Bagshot North (1910–1977 Lyndale) • Barnadown (1875–1971 Clare Inn, Barnedown) • Big Hill (1860–1922 Crusoe, Crusoe Hill) • Costerfield (1863–1993 Costerfield South, Wild Duck Creek) • Derrinal (1889–1964 Sheedy Heights) • Drummartin (1885–1951) • Elmore (Bertram's Inn, Campaspie, Runnymede, Minto) • Emu Creek (1864–1960 Strathfieldsaye) • Eppalock (1910–1974 Eppalock Weir, Mosquito Creek) • Fosterville (1867–1974) • Goornong (1884– Goornong South) • Heathcote (McIvor Creek, Pink Cliffs) • Hunter (1921–1980 Hunter South) • Huntly (1860– Huntley) • Huntly North (1913–1966 Neilborough East) • Junortoun (1912– Junorton) • Kimbolton (1889–1993) • Ladys Pass (1902–1959 Junction Hotel) • Leichardt (1878–1993) • Lockwood (1855–1981 Lockwood North) • Lockwood South (1907– ) • Longlea (1889–1989 Axe Creek) • Lyal (1872–1955 Redesdale North, Lyall) • Maiden Gully (1908– Maiden's Gully, Specimen Hill) • Mandurang (1874– ) • Mandurang South (1906–1986) • Marong (Bullock Creek) • Mia Mia (Meadow Valley, Spring Plains (in Mitchell Shire)) Mount Camel (1959–1970) • Myers Flat (1858–1971 Myer's Creek) • Myrtle Creek (1928–1960 Pilchers Bridge) • Neilborough (1858–1975 Whipstick, Neilborough North, Summerfield) • Raywood • Sebastian (1874–1976) • Sedgwick (1880–1994) • Shelbourne (1871–1976 East Shelbourne, Shelbourne East) • Strathfieldsaye (Strathfieldsaye North) • Wellsford (Yankee Creek) • Whipstick (Gum Tree Flat, see Neilborough) • Wilsons Hill (Wilson Reef) • Woodvale (1875–1950 Sydney Flat)

== Shire of Mount Alexander ==
37°04′00″S 144°13′00″E

Barfold (Emberton) • Baringhup (1858–1974 Baringhup East, Cairn Curran Reservoir) • Baringhup West (1884–1954) • Barkers Creek (1858–1977) • Bradford (1902–1919 Pollard) • Campbells Creek (Little Bendigo, Nerrina, Strathloddon) • Campbelltown (1861–1993 Glengower) • Castlemaine (Forrest Creek, Mount Alexander, Happy Valley, Clinkers Hill, Iredale Terrace, Kalimna Park, Milkmaids Flat, Norwood Hill, Ten Foot Hill, Wesley Hill, Winters Flat) • Chewton • Chewton Bushlands • Elphinstone • Faraday • Fryerstown (Fryer's Creek, Spring Gully) • Glenluce (1868–1969) • Golden Point • Gower (1885–1953 Gowar, Gowar East) • Green Gully (1862–1969) • Guildford • Harcourt • Harcourt North (1925–1971 Dog Rocks Saddle) • Irishtown • Joyces Creek (1860–1952) • Langley (1861–1970 Barfold) • Lockwood South (1907– ) • Maldon (Porcupine Flat, Perkins Reef, Tarrangower Fields) • McKenzie Hill (Diamond Gully) • Metcalfe (Watchbox Gully) • Metcalfe East (1909–1968 East Metcalfe) • Moonlight Flat (1879–1958) • Muckleford (Muckleford North) • Muckleford South (1873–1970) • Neereman (1881–1917) • Newstead • Nuggetty (1864–1903 Nuggety Reef) • Ravenswood (1858–1885) • Ravenswood South • Redesdale • Sandon (1864–1970 Eberys) • Strangways (1865–1974 Captain's Gully) • Strathlea (1923–1968) • Sutton Grange (Wellington Flat, Preston Vale) • Taradale • Tarilta (1861–1965 Kangaroo) • Tarrengower (1913–1941 Brokenback, Tarrangower) • Vaughan • Walmer (1868–1958 Muckleford Railway Station, Woodbrook, Chinaman's Creek) • Welshmans Reef (1861–1969) • Werona (1875–1968 Campbelltown East, Werona Basin) • Yandoit Hills (1860–1972 Yandoit) • Yapeen (1858–1965 Strathloddon)

== Shire of Central Goldfields ==
37°03′00″S 143°44′00″E

Adelaide Lead (Opossum Gully, Norval) • Alma • Amherst • Archdale (1878–1961) • Archdale Junction (1902–1954) • Bet Bet (1861–1975) • Betley (1889–1975 Middle Bridge) • Bowenvale (1865–1981 Timor, Leviathan Reef) • Bromley (1861–1942 Burnt Creek) • Bung Bong (Moore's Flat) • Caralulup (1879–1954) • Carisbrook (Charlotte Plains, Mosquito Flat) • Cotswold (1910–1924) • Craigie (1860–1949 McCullum's Creek, Cockatoo, Narrigal) • Daisy Hill (1875–1968 Emu) • Dunluce (1904–1942 Natte Yallock East) • Dunolly • Flagstaff • Golden Point • Goldsborough (1868–1964 Goldsborough Reef see Dunolly) • Havelock (1861–1933) • Inkerman (1861–1919) • Lillicur • Majorca (1863–1973 Tullaroop Dam) • Maryborough (Primrose Hill) • Moliagul • Moolort (Moolort North) • Moonlight Flat (1890–1958 Moonlight) • Mount Cameron (1871–1994) • Mount Glasgow • Mount Hooghly (1886–1940) • Natte Yallock (1867–1993) • Red Lion (1864–1910 Mount Greenock) • Rodborough (1879–1929) • Simson (1888–1895 Shaw's Reef Railway Station, Simson's Railway Station see Maryborough) • Stony Creek (1902–1907) • Talbot (Back Creek, Rocky Flat) • Timor (1865–1884 see Bowenvale) • Timor West (1880–1955) • Wareek (1870–1977)

== Shire of Pyrenees ==
37°10′00″S 143°25′00″E

Amphitheatre (Green Hill, Green Hills, Green Hill Creek, Rosyth) • Avoca (Bolerch, Riversdale, Four Mile Flat) • Ballyrogan (1875–1930) • Barkly (1861–1981 Navarre Rush) • Beaufort (Fiery Creek, Eurambeen, Raglan, Shirley) • Brewster (1924–1944) • Burnbank (1926–1966 Burn Bank see Lexton) • Carngham (1856–1973) • Carranballac (1910–1973 Bendemere) • Chepstowe (1849–1967 Mortchup) • Chute (1866–1959 Charlton) • Cross Roads • Crowlands (1856–1973) • Ercildoune (1909–1909) • Evansford (1865–1971 Stewarton) • Frenchmans (1880–1969) • Glenbrae (1909–1931) • Glenlofty (1902–1929 Glenlofty Creek) • Glenpatrick (1873–1951) • Hillcrest (1926–1969) • Homebush (1863–1944) • Lake Goldsmith (1863–1950 Stockyard Hill) • Lake Wongan • Lamplough • Landsborough (1862– Malakoff) • Langi Kal Kal (see Trawalla) • Lexton (Burn Bank, Doctors Creek) • Lower Homebush • Main Lead (1871–1934) • Mena Park (1920–1952 Lillerie) • Middle Creek (1881–1971 Middle Creek Rail) • Moonambel (1861–1986 Mountain Creek) • Mount Emu (1950–1950) • Mount Lonarch (1885–1976) • Natte Yallock (1867–1993) • • Nerring (1866–1953 Sailor's Gully) • Nowhere Creek • Percydale (1862–1942 Fiddler's Creek, Pyrenees) • Pittong (1902–1954 Knight, O'Meara's) • Raglan • Rathscar (1884–1972) • Rathscar West (1902–1933) • Redbank (1861–1981) • Snake Valley (1859– Chinaman's Flat, Chinaman Flat, Preston Hill, Poverty Point) • Stockyard Hill (1863–1932) • Stoneleigh • Tanwood (1902–1959 Wattle Grove, Kimberley) • Trawalla • Warrenmang (1871–1930 Glenshee) • Waterloo (Waterloo Plains) • Wattle Creek (1906–1954) • Waubra (The Springs, Mount Mitchell) • Yalla-Y-Poora (1950–1951)

== Shire of Hepburn ==
37°18′50″S 144°08′16″E

Allendale (Allandale) • Basalt (1890–1895 Basalt Hill) • Blampied (Eastern Hill, Kangaroo Hills) • Broomfield (1875–1974) • Bullarto • Cabbage Tree (Cabbage Tree Flat) • Campbelltown (1861–1993 Glengower) • Clunes (Lord Clyde) • Clydesdale (1861–1974) • Coomoora (1890–1965) • Creswick (Creswick's Creek, Graham's Hill, Hollinwood) • Creswick North (1913–1973) • Daylesford (Victoria Park, Bryces Flat, Kidds Gully, Wombat Flat) • Dean • Denver (1902–1959 Burke) • Drummond (1862–1974) • Drummond North (1885–1956) • Dry Diggings (1863–1921 see Mount Franklin) • Dunach (1870–1931) • Eganstown (Deep Creek, Egan's Town) • Elevated Plains • Franklinford • Glengower (1868–1952 Middle Creek, Powlett's Hill, Powlett Hill) • Glenlyon • Guildford (1861–1993) • Hepburn (1890–1995 see Hepburn Springs) • Hepburn Springs (Jim Crow Diggings, Old Racecourse, Spring Creek) • Kingston • Kooroocheang (1864–1974 Hit Or Miss) • Langdons Hill (1883–1935) • Lawrence (1886–1949 Clementston) • Leonards Hill (Leonards) • Little Hampton (1890–1995) • Lyonville • Mollongghip (1890–1995) • Mount Beckworth (1863–1955 Mount Beckwith) • Mount Franklin (1863–1968 Dry Diggings) • Mount Prospect (1862–1967) • Musk (1879–1974 Musk Creek) • Musk Vale (1870–1965 Muskvale, Woodburn) • Newbury (1863–1974 Bateman's, Bateman's Hill, Jack's Hotel (Newbury)) • Newlyn (Bellvue) • Newlyn North (1915–1993) • North Blackwood (Blackwood North, Waldron) • Porcupine Ridge (1902–1909) • Rocklyn (1862–1970 Rocky Lead, Wombat) • Sailors Falls (1914–1972 Borland's) • Sailors Hill • Shepherds Flat (1866–1968) • Smeaton (Jerusalem, Moorookyle) • Smokey Town • Springmount (1878–1977) • Sulky (1859–1966 Sulky Gully, Waubra Junction) • Taradale (1856– ) • Trentham • Trentham East (1871–1976 East Trentham) • Tylden South (1875–1895 South Tylden) • Ullina (1866–1966) • Wheatsheaf (1902–1959) • Yandoit (1860–1972 Kennedys Gully)

== City of Ballarat ==
37°33′00″S 143°51′00″E

Addington • Alfredton • Ascot (1858–1969) • Bakery Hill (1992– ) • Bald Hills (1861–1968) • Ballarat Central (Ballaarat, Ballarat West, Ballarat South) • Ballarat East • Ballarat North • Black Hill • Blowhard (1861–1966 Mount Blowhard, Blowhard Rail, The Rose) • Bo Peep (1872–1924 Bo Peep Hill, Trunk Lead) • Bonshaw • Brown Hill (Woodmans Hill) • Buninyong (1839–1859 Bunnenyong) • Bunkers Hill • Burrumbeet (1857–1978 Black Swamp (in Pyrenees Shire)) • Canadian (1886–1988) • Cardigan (1861–1975 Kopke) • Cardigan Village • Chapel Flat • Coghills Creek (1860–1968) • Delacombe • Durham Lead (1861–1976 Hardies Hill) • Ercildoune (1909–1909 Ercildoun) • Eureka (1946–1993) • Glen Park (Bungaree Springs, Glenpark) • Glendaruel (1858–1955) • Glendonnell (1868–1917 Glendonald) • Golden Point (1851–1864 Poverty Point, 1864– Sovereign Hill) • Gong Gong (1877–1917) • Invermay • Invermay Park • Lake Gardens • Lake Wendouree (1956 for Olympic games rowing) • Learmonth (Lake Learmonth) • Lucas (2011– ) • Magpie (1873–1972 Black Lead) • Miners Rest (1857– Midas) • Mitchell Park • Mount Bolton (see Addington) (1863–1974) • Mount Clear (1865– ) • Mount Helen • Mount Pleasant (1858–1983) • Mount Rowan (1867–1974) • Nerrina (1862–1971 Little Bendigo) • Newington (1864–1974) • Redan (Redan Bridge) • Scotchmans Lead (Scotchmans, Yarrowee) • Scotsburn (Scott's Marsh) • Sebastopol • Soldiers Hill • Tourello (1868–1950) • Warrenheip (1859–1988) • Weatherboard (1868–1969 Weatherboard Hill) • Wendouree (Wendouree West, Wendouree Village) • Windermere (1862–1975)

== Golden Plains Shire ==
38°01′00″S 143°58′00″E

Bamganie (1877–1961) • Bannockburn (Leigh Road, Wabdallah) • Barunah Park • Berringa (Kangaroo) • Cambrian Hill (1865–1966) • Cape Clear • Corindhap (Break O'Day, Break of Day) • Dereel • Durdidwarrah (1866–1919 Stony Creek) • Enfield (1861–1971 Whim Holes, Little Hard Hills) • Garibaldi • Gheringhap • Haddon (1863–1976 Sago Hill) • Happy Valley (1860–1959) • Hesse (1871–1966 Warrambine, Warambeen, Halfway) • Illabarook (1862–1971 Bull Dog, Bulldog Flat) • Inverleigh (Doroq, Barunah Plains) • Lethbridge (Golf Hill) • Linton (Linton's) • Mannibadar (1924–1947) • Maude • Meredith (Woodburn Creek, Woodbourne) • Mount Mercer (1865–1965 Lawaluk) • Murgheboluc (1860–1995) • Napoleons (Napoleon) • Newtown (Newtown-Scarsdale) • Nintingbool • Piggoreet (1864–1952) • Pitfield (1857–1946 Pitfield Plains) • Rokewood • Rokewood Junction (1868–1976 see Rokewood) • Ross Creek (1865–1969 Ross Village, Golden Lake) • Russells Bridge (1923–1930) • Scarsdale (1860– Italian Gully) • She Oaks (Sheoaks) • Shelford (The Leigh) • Smythes Creek (1905–1993 see Smythesdale) • Smythesdale • Springdallah (1902–1930 Burke's) • Staffordshire Reef (1859–1988) • Steiglitz (Steiglitz North, Pipehead) • Stonehaven (1859–1988) • Sutherlands Creek (Sutherland Creek) • Teesdale • Wallinduc (1859–1988 Hollybush, Holly Bush) • Werneth (1859–1988 Wilgul) • Willowvale (1924–1955)

== Shire of Corangamite ==
38°14′00″S 143°09′00″E

Berrybank (1908–1978 Berry Bank, Naringhil South, Naringal South) • Bookaar (1905–1955 Bookar Creamery, Bookar, The Gums) • Boorcan (1887–1975 Burcan) • Bostock Creek (1902–1962 Bostocks Creek Creamery, Bostocks Creek) • Bradvale (1923–1954) • Brucknell (1902–1932 Brucknell South, Nullawarre East) • Bullaharre (1924–1951 Bullaharee) • Camperdown • Carpendeit (1871–1967) • Chocolyn • Cobden • Cobrico (1886–1971 Cobrico Cheese Factory) • Cooriemungle • Cowleys Creek (1880–1949) • Curdie Vale (1920–1969 Boggy Creek) • Curdies River (1910–1968) • Derrinallum (Geelengla, Tooliorook, Mount Elephant, Cloven Hills) • Dixie (1907–1957) • Duverney (1914–1961 Strathvean) • Ecklin South (1902–1969 Mumblin) • Elingamite (1902–1937) • Elingamite North • Foxhow • Gellibrand Lower (1893–1969 Lower Gellibrand, Burrupa) • Glenfyne (1937–1968) • Glenormiston North (1902–1970 Glenormiston) • Glenormiston South (1909–1994 Glenormiston Butter Factory) • Gnotuk (1910–1976) • Heytesbury Lower (1945–1969) • Jancourt (1902–1904) • Jancourt East (1938–1967) • Kariah (1881–1936) • Kennedys Creek (1905–1974) • Koallah (1924–1978) • Larralea (1902–1928 Taaraak) • Leslie Manor (1924–1970 Coradjil) • Lismore (Gnarkeet, Gnarpurt, Struan) • Mingay (1914–1927) • Mount Bute (1923–1954) • Naroghid (1875–1964 Marida Yallock) • Newfield (1892–1964) • Noorat (Mount Noorat, Koonendah Railway Station (in Moyne Shire)) • Noorat East • Paaratte (1938–1972 Paaratte Corner) • Peterborough (1890– ) • Pomborneit (1868–1982) • Pomborneit East (1937–1969) • Pomborneit North (1910–1977) • Port Campbell (Port Campbell West) • Princetown (1859–1988 Princeton, Rivernook House) • Purrumbete South (Tandarook South) • Scotts Creek (1879–2000) • Simpson (1962– ) • Skibo • Skipton • Stonyford (1866–1980 Stoneyford) • Tandarook (1921–1956) • Terang (Keilambete, Keilambete East) • Tesbury (1921–1944 Talindert) • Timboon • Timboon West • Vite Vite (1914–1953) • Vite Vite North (1923–1950) • Waarre • Wattle Hill (1947) • Weerite (1891–1974 Purrumbeet North, Wiridjil)

== Shire of Colac Otway ==
38°20′00″S 143°35′00″E

Aire Valley (1912–1919 Aire, see Glenaire) • Alvie • Apollo Bay (Krambruk, Middleton, Krambruk North, Blanket Bay Saw Mill, Killala) • Balintore (1922–1959) • Barongarook (1887–1974 Barongarook East, Coram) • Barongarook West (1947–1971) • Barramunga (1887–1981 Olangolah East, Olangolah) • Barwon Downs (1888–1975) • Beeac (Ondit, Salt Works) • Beech Forest (McDevitt's, Wimba, Harrison's, Websters Hill, Wellesley) • Birregurra (Mount Gellibrand, Ricketts Marsh, Armytage) • Bungador (1925–1970) • Cape Otway (1880–1972 Cape Horn, Parker River) • Carlisle River (1901–2000 Charley's Creek) • Chapple Vale (1906–1971 Chapple Creek, Barwongemoong West, Devondale) • Colac (Lake Colac) • Colac East (1910–1983) • Colac West (1902– ) • Coragulac (1924–1974) • Cororooke (1887– Cororooke South) • Corunnun (1920–1980) • Cressy • Cundare (1886–1903) • Cundare North (1911–1969 North Cundare) • Dreeite (1912–1971 Corangamite, North Dreeite) • Dreeite South (1925–1934) • Elliminyt (1879–1993 Tulloh) • Eurack (1905–1961 Eurack Creamery) • Ferguson (1919–1951 Dinmont) • Forrest (Yaugher) • Gellibrand (1898– Banool, Baldwin's, Gellibrand River, Upper Gellibrand, Lovat, Loves River) • Gerangamete (1879–1969) • Glenaire (1912–1988 Aire) • Grey River • Hordern Vale (1912–1956 Calder River) • Irrewarra (1880–1973 Ondit Road, Nawallah) • Irrewillipe (1874–1959) • Irrewillipe East (1879–1959 Tomahawk Creek) • Johanna (Johanna Heights, Graham Junction) • Kawarren (1906–1974 Kawarren East) • Kennett River • Larpent (1861–1964) • Lavers Hill (Lavers Hill South, Barwongemoong, Crowes, Stalker) • Marengo • Mount Sabine (1907–1939) • Murroon (1870–1960) • Nalangil (1902–1967 Cororooke West) • Ombersley (1884–1963 Mount Hesse) • Ondit (1908–1971 and see Beeac) • Petticoat Creek • Pirron Yallock (1872–1973 Pirron Yaloak, Pirron Yalloak) • Separation Creek (see Wye River) • Skenes Creek (1890–1971) • Skenes Creek North (1920–1960 Biddles) • Sugarloaf (1902–1930) • Swan Marsh (1904– Pirron Yallock Creamery) • Tanybryn (1915–1970) • Warncoort (1892–1970) • Warrion (Bullock Swamp) • Weeaproinah (1900–1967 Weeaproniah, Pile Siding) • Weering (1882–1958) • Whoorel (1910–1969) • Wingeel • Wongarra (1912–1971 Cape Patton) • Wool Wool (1921–1971) • Wye River (Separation Creek) • Wyelangta (1912–1969 Kincaid, Kincaid Siding) • Yeo • Yeodene (1926–1971) • Yuulong (1906–1972 Colac Tree, Wangerrip, Wangerrip Factory)

== Surf Coast Shire ==
38°18′00″S 144°00′00″E

Aireys Inlet • Anglesea (Swampy Creek, Point Roadknight) • Bambra (1892–1973) • Barrabool (1892–1973) • Bellbrae • Bells Beach • Benwerrin (1886–1927 Wymbooliel) • Big Hill (1860–1922 Big Hill Creek) • Boonah (1887–1929) • Buckley (1870–1970 Buckley's Road, Modewarre Railway Station, Lake Town Railway Station) • Deans Marsh (Yan Yan Gurt) • Eastern View (1924–1967 Memorial Arch) • Fairhaven (1911–1957) • Freshwater Creek (1860–1961) • Gherang (Gherang Military) • Gnarwarre (1857–1963) • Jan Juc • Lorne (Lorne North, Split Point Lighthouse, Allenvale, Cumberland Creek, Cumberland Valley, Little Colac, Sheoak) • Modewarre (1859–1967) • Moggs Creek • Moriac • Mount Duneed (1860–1959 Connewarre, Puelba) • Mount Moriac (1854–1978 Duneed) • Paraparap (1910–1955) • Pennyroyal (1887–1955 Pennyroyal Creek) • Torquay (Spring Creek, Ocean Views, Wombah Park, Zeally Bay) • Wensleydale (Sokel) • Winchelsea (Armytage, Barwon, Ingleby) • Winchelsea South • Wurdiboluc (1866–1966 Wordieboluc)

== City of Greater Geelong ==
38°09′00″S 144°21′00″E

=== Suburbs of Geelong ===
Bell Park (Separation Street) • Bell Post Hill • Belmont • Breakwater • Corio (Cowies Creek, Rosewall) • Drumcondra • Geelong • East Geelong • North Geelong (Geelong North) • South Geelong • Geelong West (Ashby, Little Scotland, Kildare, Shandeen, Western Heights) • Grovedale (Germantown, Grovedale East) • Hamlyn Heights (Vines Road) • Herne Hill • Highton (Montpellier, Highton South) • Lara (Lara Lake, Flinders Peak) • Leopold (Kensington, Kensington Hill, Leopold Hill) • Lovely Banks (Lovely Banks Reservoir) • Manifold Heights (Manifold, Minerva) • Marshall (Marshalltown) • Moolap (Point Henry, Moolap West) • Mount Duneed • Newcomb • Newtown (Bareena, Chilwell, Marnock Vale) • Norlane (Norlane West) • North Shore • Rippleside • St Albans Park • Thomson • Wandana Heights • Waurn Ponds (Pettavel) • Whittington

=== Towns and localities ===
Anakie (Anakie East) • Avalon • Balliang • Barwon Heads (Connewarre East) • Batesford (Hopeton) • Bellarine (Port Bellarine) • Breamlea (Thompsons Creek) • Ceres • Clifton Springs (Fairy Dell) • Connewarre • Curlewis • Drysdale (McLeod's Waterholes, Bellarine, Murrudoc, Murradoc) • Fyansford (Buckley's Falls) • Indented Head • Little River (Cocoroc Rivulet, Rothwell) • Mannerim • Marcus Hill • Moorabool • Ocean Grove (Collendina) • Point Wilson • Portarlington (Port Arlington) • St Leonards • Staughton Vale (Anakie Junction) • Swan Bay • Wallington

== Borough of Queenscliffe ==
38°16′00″S 144°39′00″E

Point Lonsdale • Queenscliff (Queenscliff Lookout, Whale Head, Shortland's Bluff) • Swan Island

== Shire of Moorabool ==
37°36′00″S 144°15′00″E

Bacchus Marsh • Ballan (Bradshaw's Creek, Bradshaw) • Balliang (Mount Rothwell, Ripley Ford (in Greater Geelong) ) • Balliang East (1911–1958) • Barkstead (1869–1972) • Barrys Reef (1866–1956) • Beremboke (1877–1968) • Blackwood (Mount Blackwood, Golden Point, Simmons' Reef) • Blakeville (1871–1964 Ballanee) • Bolwarrah (1867–1971 Devil's Creek, Bolwarra) • Bullarook (1861–1973) • Bullarto South (1884–1974) • Bunding (1886–1969) • Bungal (Ballark) • Bungaree • Cargerie (1868–1930 Cargarie) • Clarendon (1857–1976 Corduroy Bridge) • Claretown (1902–1963) • Clarkes Hill (1872–1968) • Coimadai (1867–1969 Coimadai Creek) • Colbrook (1889–1932) • Dales Creek • Darley (1940–1946 Darley Military) • Dunnstown (Dunn's Town) • Elaine • Fiskville (Yaloak) • Glenmore (Yaloak Vale) • Gordon (Gordon's, Ormond) • Greendale • Grenville (1886–1963) • Hopetoun Park • Ingliston (1890–1954 Darriwell, Bungletap) • Korobeit (1891–1961) • Korweinguboora (1878–1972 Paddy Point) • Lal Lal • Leigh Creek (1865–1979) • Lerderderg • Long Forest • Maddingley • Merrimu • Millbrook (1868–1985 Moorabool Creek) • Morrisons (1859–1953 Morrison's Diggings, Riverside, Morrison, Upper Morrison, Dolly's Creek, Dolly's Diggings) • Mount Doran (1859–1930 see Elaine) • Mount Egerton • Mount Wallace (1871–1965) • Myrniong (Pyke's Creek, Pykes Creek Reservoir) • Navigators (1889–1976) • Parwan • Pentland Hills (1858–1872 see Myrniong) • Pootilla (1878–1971) • Rowsley (1890–1962) • Spargo Creek (1902–1970) • Springbank (1875–1966) • Wallace • Wattle Flat (1902–1962) • Yendon (R1862–1978 Buninyong Railway Station)

== Shire of Macedon Ranges ==
37°21′00″S 144°37′00″E

Ashbourne (Campaspe) • Baynton • Baynton East • Benloch (1920–1952) • Bolinda • Bullengarook (Bullengarook East) • Cadello • Carlsruhe (Carlsruhe Rail) • Cherokee • Chintin (1875–1966) • Clarkefield (Lancefield Junction, Lancefield Road) • Cobaw • Darraweit Guim • Edgecombe (1877–1966) • Fern Hill (1909–1976 Fernhill) • Gisborne (Bush Inn) • Gisborne South (1867–1965 Cabbage Tree, Yangardook, Couangalt) • Glenhope (1882–1952 Glenhope East) • Goldie (1870–1884 Goldie North) • Greenhill (1861–1962 Green Hills, Green Hill) • Hanging Rock • Hesket • Kerrie • Kyneton (Boggy Creek, Bald Hill, Woodleigh Heights) • Kyneton South (1918–1921 Coliban Upper) • Lancefield (Five Mile Creek) • Lauriston (Redesdale Junction) • Macedon (Black Forest) • Malmsbury (Malmesbury) • Monegeetta (Duck Holes, Monegatta, Monegeeta, Monegatta South, North Monegeeta, North Monegeetta) • Mount Macedon (Macedon Upper, Barringo) • New Gisborne • Newham (Hieland Town, Isle of Skye) • Pastoria (1868–1898) • Pastoria East (1902–1966) • Pipers Creek (1886–1964) • Riddells Creek (Riddell) • Rochford (Monument Creek, Whan's) • Romsey (Bolinda Vale, Tickawarra) • Sidonia (1899–1965) • Spring Hill (1862–1968) • Springfield • Tantaraboo (1878–1965) • Trentham East (1871–1976 East Trentham) • Tylden (Coliban Reservoir) • Woodend • Woodend North (1884–1958)

== Shire of Murrindindi ==
37°20′00″S 145°30′00″E

Acheron (Acheron Lower) • Alexandra (Red Gate Diggings, Redgate) • Buxton • Castella (1918–1965) • Cathkin • Caveat (1911–1930) • Cheviot (Ross Creek) • Devils River • Dropmore (1887–1930) • Eildon (Eildon Weir, Burnt Bridge, Nelson's Hill, Snobs Creek) • Fawcett (1885–1968) • Flowerdale (Hazeldene, Hazeldean) • Ghin Ghin (1868–1873) • Glenburn (Glenburn Creamery, Devlin Bridge) • Gobur (1869–1974 Godfrey's Creek) • Highlands (1906–1952) • Homewood (1874–1975 Doogalook, Dairy Creek) • Kanumbra (1891–1978) • Kerrisdale (1884–1977) • Killingworth • Kinglake (Kinglake East, Mountain Rush) • Kinglake Central • Kinglake West • Koriella (1891–1968 Alexandra Road, Rhodes) • Limestone • Maintongoon • Marysville (Wilks Creek) • Molesworth • Murrindindi (1885–1973 Woodbourne) • Narbethong (Dunholm, St Fillan's, The Hermitage, The Hermitage (Black Spur), Granton) • Pheasant Creek (1902– ) • Rubicon (1926–1964 Torbreck Station) • Strath Creek • TaggertyTaggerty (Acheron Upper) • Taylor Bay • Terip Terip (1881–1941) • Thornton (1866– ) • Toolangi • Yarck • Yea (Muddy Creek) •

== Shire of Mitchell ==
'37°06′00″S 145°04′00″E

Beveridge • Broadford • Bylands (1880–1994) • Clonbinane (Wall Crossing) • Forbes (1874–1918) • Glenaroua (1877–1963 Glenaroua Upper) • Glenhope (1882–1952) • Glenhope East (1902–1931) • Heathcote Junction • Heathcote South (1917–1974) • High Camp • Hilldene (1913–1916) • Kilmore • Kilmore East (Gavan Duffy, Cameron's Creek State School) • Kobyboyn (1884–1915) • Moranding (1890–1957 Ghera) • Northwood (1878–1942) • Nulla Vale (1877–1945 Emu Flat) • Puckapunyal (1878– Puckapunyal North, Puckapunyal Town, Puckapunyal Military, Major's Line, Mitchell's Creek, Shepherd's Creek) • Pyalong • Reedy Creek (1859–1965) • Seymour (Seymour South) • Sugarloaf Creek (1902–1930 Ahearn's (Sugarloaf Creek)) • Sunday Creek (Coulson Crossing) • Tallarook (Dysart, Dysart Siding) • Tooborac • Trawool (1886–1972 Granite) • Tyaak (1861–1947 Lower Crossing) • Upper Plenty (1902–1974 Yabamac) • Wallan (Wallan Wallan, Wallan Wallan East, Wallan East) • Wandong • Waterford Park • Whiteheads Creek (1890–1930 Burlington) • Willowmavin (1891–1957) •

== Bass Coast Shire ==
38°32′00″S 145°32′00″E

Adams Estate • Almurta (Almurta East) • Anderson (1936–1971) • Archies Creek • Bass • Cape Paterson • Cape Woolamai (Woolamai, Woolamai Waters, Woolamai Waters West) • Churchill Island • Corinella (1860– ) • Coronet Bay (1969–1975) • Cowes (Cowes East, Cowes West) • Dalyston (1904– Hicksborough, Dudley) • Dudley South (1912–1977) • Glen Alvie (1890–1977 Jumbunna, Korrine) • Glen Forbes (1902–1994 Mann's, Kernot) • Grantville (1875– ) • Harmers Haven • Inverloch (Anderson's Inlet) • Jam Jerrup • Kernot (1911– see Glen Forbes) • Kilcunda (Bridge Creek) • Krowera (1889–1968 Bass Valley) • Lance Creek (1915–1937) • Lang Lang (Lang Lang West) • Loch (1887– ) • Newhaven • Pioneer Bay • Powlett River (1874–1956) • Queensferry (1874–1934) • Rhyll • Ryanston (1891–1954 Balmattum, Balmattum East, Blackwood Forest) • San Remo (Griffith's Point, Goodhurst) • Silverleaves • Smiths Beach • St Clair (1910–1918 see Wonthaggi) • Summerlands • Sunderland Bay • Sunset Strip • Surf Beach • Tenby Point • The Gurdies • Ventnor (1915–1944 Beachcomber Estate) • Wattle Bank (1920–1930 Wattlebank) • West Creek (1871–1958 Powlett River) • Wimbledon Heights • Wonthaggi (Powlett Coal Mine, St Clair) • Wonthaggi North (1912–1969 North Wonthaggi) • Woodleigh (1896–1980 Woodleigh Vale, St Helier, Fern Hill) • Woolamai (1859–1965 Milndale, Milne's and see Cape Woolamai)

== South Gippsland Shire ==
38°35′00″S 146°00′00″E

Agnes (Barry Beach) • Allambee South • Arawata (1891–1957) • Baromi (1886–1892 see Mirboo North) • Bena (R1887-2003 Kilcunda Road) • Bennison (1890–1962 Liverpool, Franklin River) • Berrys Creek (1924–1925 Mount Vernon) • Boolarong (1907–1970 Boolarong South) • Boolarra South (1915–1919) • Boorool • Buffalo (1892– Buffalo Creek) • Delburn (1902–1966 Darlimurla, Morrell's Hill) • Darby River • Dollar (1902–1971 Carmichael) • Dumbalk (1890– Woorayl) • Dumbalk North (1907–1944 Milford Grange, Fidges, Milford) • Fairbank (1888–1930) • Fish Creek (Boys, Hoddle Range, Hoddle, O'Gradys Ridge) • Foster (Stockyard Creek, Cypress Grove, Golden Creek, Henwoods, Corner Inlet, Amery's Track, Amey's Track) • Foster North (1914–1960 Grassy Spur, Tannahills) • Gunyah (1904–1942 Gunyah Gunyah, Gunyah Junction, Olsen's Bridge) • Hallston (1927–1955) • Hazel Park (1922–1959) • Hedley (1892–1994 Hodgkinson) • Inverloch (Andersons Inlet) • Jeetho (1884–1951 Jeetho Valley, Horner) • Jumbunna • Kardella (1892–1977) • Kardella South (1922–1946) • Kongwak (Burndale, Ellerside) • Koonwarra (1890– ) • Koorooman (1887–1939 Kooraman State School, Koorooman East, and see Leongatha) • Korumburra (Glentress) • Korumburra South (1914–1928) • Leongatha • Leongatha North (1906–1950 Wooreen) • Leongatha South (1902–1947) • Mardan (1885–1941 Mardan South, Glen Mona) • Meeniyan • Middle Tarwin (1925–1972) • Mirboo (1879–1971 East Tarwin, Tarwin East, Riverview see Mirboo North) • Mirboo East • Mirboo North (Mirboo Central, Mirboo South, Dickies Hill Junction) • Mount Best (1904–1970 Devils Pinch, Mount Fatigue) • Mount Eccles (1890–1951 Geachville) • Mount Eccles South • Moyarra (1884–1921 Jumbunna East) • Nerrena (1909–1948 Nerrena East) • Nyora (Lang Lang East) • Outtrim (1894–1957 Outtrim South) • Poowong (Abshott) • Poowong East (1886–1916 Cruickston) • Poowong North (1884–1957) • Port Franklin (Bowen) • Port Welshpool (1910–1994) • Pound Creek (1892–1955) • Ranceby • Ruby (1892–1974) • Sandy Point • Stony Creek (Fish Creek North, Rumbug) • Strzelecki (1902–1953 Jensen's, Strezelecki, Strezleckie, Seabrook) • Tarwin (1879–1881 see Mirboo North) • Tarwin Lower (Tarwin Meadows, Lake Tutegong, Liptrap) • Tidal River (1954–1993 Tidal River Camp) • Toora • Toora North (1915–1952 Attercliffe) • Turtons Creek (1904–1966) • Venus Bay • Walkerville (Waratah Bay, Promontory View, Walkerville North) • Walkerville South • Waratah Bay (Waratah North see Walkerville) • Welshpool (1859– Granite Bar) • Whitelaw (1891–1961) • Wild Dog Valley • Wilsons Promontory (1873–1951 Darby) • Wonga (1921–1966 Bonnie Brae, Wonga Wonga) • Woorarra East (1902–1970 Woorarra) • Woorarra West (1904–1947) • Yanakie (Yanakie South, Shallow Inlet)

== Shire of Baw Baw ==
37°57′00″S 146°07′00″E

Aberfeldy (Mount Lookout) • Ada (Mount Ada) • Allambee (1883–1955) • Allambee Reserve • Amor • Athlone (Lindermann's) • Baw Baw (1909–1968 Kelly's, Holmedale, Beardmores, Beardmore) • Baw Baw Village • Bona Vista (1909–1948) • Boola (1885–1912 Brunton, Conference Corner) • Brandy Creek (1902–1958 see Drouin) • Bravington • Buln Buln (Brandy Creek, and see Drouin) • Buln Buln East (1882–1962 Drouin North) • Caringal (1938–1960 Tyers Junction, Saxton) • Childers (1879–1972) • Cloverlea (1914–1946) • Coalville (1888–1960) • Coopers Creek (1868–1953 Jubilee and see Walhalla) • Crossover (1866–1964 Crossover Diggings) • Darlimurla (1880–1968) • Darnum • Drouin (Robin Hood) • Drouin East • Drouin South (1881–1973) • Drouin West (1876–1976 Jindivick, Whiskey Creek) • Ellinbank (1879–1948 Torwood) • Erica (Harris, Parkers Corner, Upper Moondarra, Telbit Crossing) • Ferndale (1902–1933) • Fumina (1902–1967 Fumina Settlement, North Fumina) • Fumina South (Duggan, Russell's Creek, Tangil) • Gainsborough (1891–1946) • Gentle Annie (1926–1947 Nayook West, Whites Corner) • Hallora (1902–1963 Topiram, Warneet) • Heath Hill (1883–1962) • Hill End (1900–1981 Hillend) • Icy Creek • Jacob Creek • Jericho (1865–1939 Red Jacket, Alhambra, Roberts, Saint Clair, The Oaks, The Springs) • Jindivick (1888–1964 Tarago, Jindivick North, Jindivick West and see Drouin) • Labertouche (1887–1956) • Lardner (1878–1961) • Lillico • Loch Valley (1913–1942) • Longwarry (Longwarry East) • Longwarry North (1927–1957) • Mirboo South (1885–1904 Russell's) • Modella (1904–1963) • Moondarra (1883–1972 Moondarra Reservoir, Gould, Collins Siding, Watson) • Mountain View (1901–1959 Triholm) • Narracan (1877–1974 Narracan Railway Township, Narracan East, Narracan South) • Nayook (1953–1976) • Neerim • Neerim East (1902–1964 Bosworth, Rosworth) • Neerim Junction (1907–1994) • Neerim North (Barr's) • Neerim South • Nilma (Bloomfield) • Noojee (Capuano, Horsfal, Kanawha, Pangorang, Quongup, Twelftrees, Hayman Corner) • Nilma North (1905–1906 McDonald's Track) • Piedmont (1902–1903) • Rawson • Ripplebrook (1881–1962 Longwarry South, Remington see Longwarry) • Rokeby • Seaview (1891–1960) • Shady Creek (1871–1955) • Tanjil (Old Tanjil, Palmer, Western Tyers) • Tanjil Bren (Millswyn, Downey, Kirchubel, Newlands, Strahan) • Tanjil South (1915–1954 Tangil South) • Tetoora Road (1915–1947) • Thaloo • Thomson (Sullivans, Swingler, The Junction, Toner) • Thorpdale (Narracan West) • Thorpdale South (1888–1968 see Thorpdale) • Toombon (1862–1923 Donnelly's Creek, McGuire, O'Keefe) • Toorongo (1922–1923 Toorongo Falls, Toorongo Valley) • Trafalgar (Trafalgar West, Yalungah) • Trafalgar East (1908–1950 Moe Swamp East) • Trafalgar South (1917–1923) • Trida (1902–1930 Arminda) • Vesper (1910–1961 Tooronga) • Walhalla (Cooper's Creek, Happy-Go-Lucky, Happy Go Lucky, Knott's Siding, Ezard's Mills, Maiden Town, Mormon Town, Stringer's Creek, Western) • Warragul (Warragul Heights, Berrinba) • Warragul South (1905–1909 Bull Swamp) • Warragul West • Westbury • Willow Grove • Yarragon (Waterloo, Waterloo South) • Yarragon South (1902–1956 Chesterfield's, Allambee East)

== Latrobe City ==
38°14′00″S 146°24′00″E

Balook (1903–1965 Valley View) • Boolarra • Boolarra South (1914–1946 Limonite, Darragh's) • Budgeree (1910–1943 Budgeree East, Hood's, Livingston) • Callignee (Le Roy) • Churchill • Driffield (1902–1940 Ten Mile Creek) • Glengarry (La Trobe) • Glengarry North • Glengarry West • Grand Ridge (1910–1936 Johnstones Hill (Wellington Shire) Gemmell's Hill, English Corner, Valley View) • Hazelwood (1877–1893) • Hazelwood North • Hazelwood South • Hernes Oak (1934–1974 Haunted Hills) • Jeeralang (Jeeralang State School, Jeeralang North) • Jeeralang Junction (1915–1975) • Jumbuk (1902–1965 Jumbuk East, Mayflower, Roy's) • Koornalla (1906–1966 Upper Traralgon Creek) • Loy Yang (1887–1944) • Maryvale (1904–1958 Kowree, Derham's Hill) • Mid Valley (1983– ) • Moe (The Mowie) • Moe South (1881–1892) • Morwell (Godridge, Morwell Bridge, Morwell North, Morwell West) • Mount Tassie • Newborough (Newborough East, Newborough North) • Toongabbie • Traralgon (Cumberland Park, Pax Hill) • Traralgon East (1882–1971 Flynn's Creek Upper, Flynn Upper) • Traralgon South (1889–1952) • Tyers (Boola Boola) • Yallourn (Yallourn Railway Camp, Eastern Camp, Western Camp, Yallourn Heights) • Yallourn North (Brown Coal Mine) • Yinnar • Yinnar South

== Shire of Wellington ==
37°53′00″S 146°59′00″E

Airly (1924–1950) • Alberton • Alberton West • Arbuckle • Billabong • Binginwarri (1902–1968 Binginwarrie, Adare ) • Blackwarry (1892–1967) • Boisdale • Briagolong (Culloden, Freestone Creek) • Budgee Budgee • Bundalaguah (1892–1974) • Buragwonduc • Bushy Park • Callignee North (1902–1966 Beards) • Callignee South (1902–1930) • Calrossie • Carrajung • Carrajung Lower (1902–1969 Bruthen Creek) • Carrajung South (1916–1931) • Cherrilong (1924–1957) • Clydebank (1873–1949) • Cobains (1927–1950) • Coongulla • Cowa (1865–1916 Grant, Grant Junction, Bull Town, Peter The Swede) • Cowwarr (Upper Heyfield, Cowwar, Cowwarr Weir, Swing Bridge) • Crookayan • Crooked River (1862–1865) (Gibbs, Shepherdson) • Dargo (Dargo Flat, Dargo High Plains, Dogs Grave, Hustlers, Mayford, Riverford, Waterford, White Timber) • Darriman (1884–1968 Mullundung) • Dawson (1884–1958 Glenmaggie Railway Station) • Denison (1902–1925 Acre, Denison West, Velore) • Devon North (1891–1979 Kallady, Eilandonan, Glen Rose) • Dutson (1889–1927) • Dutson Downs • Flamingo Beach • Flynn (1880–1968 Flinnstead, Flynn's Creek Railway Station) • Flynns Creek (1872–1948) • Fulham (1890–1974) • Gelliondale (1907–1974) • Giffard (1900–1955) • Giffard West (1902–1907) • Gillum • Glen Falloch (1912–1914 Glenfalloch, see Licola) • Glenmaggie (Glenmaggie Weir, Glenmaggie Point, Store Point, The Springs) • Glomar Beach • Golden Beach • Gormandale (1887– ) • Greenmount • Hawkhurst (1924–1964 Black Snake Creek, Maguires) • Hedley (1908–1994) • Heyfield (Hayfield) • Hiamdale (1890–1895 Timbs Crossing, Hiamdall) • Hiawatha (1913–1968) • Hollands Landing (1913–1928) • Howitt Plains • Hunterston (1925–1967) • Jack River (1892–1963 Jack's Corner, Tooloonook) • Kilmany (1909–1973 Nambrok South, Kilmany South) • Koorool (Morgan) • Lake Wellington • Langsborough • Licola • Licola North (1910–1960 Glencairn) • Llowalong (1924–1944) • Loch Sport • Longford (Holey Plain South, La Trobe Bridge) • Macks Creek (1865–1974 Kevington) • Madalya (1902–1968 Ward's, Nestor) • Maffra (Sheepfold) • Maffra West Upper (Upper Maffra West) • Manns Beach • McLoughlins Beach • Meerlieu (1882–1964 Meerlieu West) • Miowera • Monomak (Bulldog Junction, Huggett Lookout) • Montgomery • Moornapa (1940–1973 Castleburn, Bulgaback Creek) • Moroka • Munro (1888–1976) • Myrtlebank (1902–1967) • Nambrok (1909–1971 Nambrok West) • Nap Nap Marra • Newry (Upper Maffra, Maffra Upper, Bellbird Corner) • Nuntin • Ocean Grange • Paradise Beach (1963–1974) • Pearsondale (1928–1930) • Perry Bridge (1879–1956) • Port Albert (Alberton, Sunday Island) • Reynard • Riverslea • Robertsons Beach • Rosedale • Sale (Flooding Creek, Guthridge) • Sale East (1943– Sale East R.A.A.F.) • Sargood • Seacombe (1888–1928 Booran) • Seaspray (1915– ) • Seaton (Bald Hills (Gippsland)) • Snake Island • Staceys Bridge (1903–1967) • Stockdale (1902–1968) • Stradbroke (1875–1969 Stradbrook, Merriman's Creek, Stradbroke West) • Stratford (Leebrooke) • Tamboritha • Tarra Valley (1907–1968 Womerah) • Tarraville (1854–1975) • The Heart (1886–1951) • The Honeysuckles • Tinamba (Mewburn Park) • Tinamba West (1902–1956 Blore) • Toolome • Toora North (1915–1930) • Valencia Creek • Walhalla East • Willung (1880–1956) • Willung South (1902–1971) • Winnindoo (1925–1967) • Won Wron (1887–1974 Napier) • Wongungarra (1865–1948 Talbotville, Winchester, Howittville, Hogtown, Naarun, Treasure) • Wonyip (1907–1968 (Christies, Proctors , Ryton) • Woodside (Woodside East, Balloong, Baloong) • Woodside Beach • Woodside North • Woolenook (Blomford) • Worrowing • Wrathung (1890) • Wrixen • Wurruk (1867–1977 Wurruk Wurruk) • Yangoura (1864–1875 Edward's Reef, Binns, Dawes, Edwards Hill, Murderers Hill, Porters) • Yarram (Yarram Yarram, Woranga, Greenmount) •

== Shire of East Gippsland ==
37°29′00″S 148°10′00″E

Allenvale, Victoria • Anglers Rest (1914–1922 Blue Duck) • Bairnsdale (Bairnsdale West, The Ridge) • Banksia Peninsula • Bellbird Creek (1911–1919) • Bemm River • Benambra (The Brothers, Uplands) • Bendoc (1869– Clarkeville, Lower Bendoc, Bendoc North, Bendoc Upper) • Bengworden (1882–1964) • Bete Bolong (1905–1912) • Bete Bolong North • Bindi (1892–1971) • Bingo Munjie (Bingo Munjie North, Bingo) • Bonang (1874–1998 Cabanandra, Cabannandra, Dellicknora, Haydens Bog, Roaring Camp) • Boole Poole • Broadlands (1902–1968) • Brodribb River (1906–1973 Brodribb, Tabbara) • Brookville (1896–1926 Strobridge, Yahoo) • Brumby • Bruthen (Bruthen Creek, Boys, Ramrod Creek) • Buchan (Sunny Point) • Buchan South (1901–1980 Canni Creek see Buchan) • Buldah (1912–1930) • Bullumwaal (1867–1978 Boggy Creek, Bulumwaal) • Bumberrah (1916–1970) • Bundara • Butchers Ridge (1902–1967) • Cabbage Tree Creek (1915–2000 Murrungowar Lower, Tarbuck's) • Calulu (1907–1971) • Cann River • Cape Conran • Cassilis • Chandlers Creek (1913–1966 Kowat, Weeragua, Split Yard)) • Clifton Creek (1913–1967 Fairhope, Ward Crossing) • Club Terrace (1896–1996 Sans Souci) • Cobbannah (1874–1934 Bulgoback, Cobbanah) • Cobberas • Cobungra (1885–1965) • Combienbar (1910–1980) • Corringle • Deddick Valley (1902–1904 Deddick, Mount Deddick) • Delegate River ((1902–1961) Delegate River East) • Deptford (1868–1928 Purtle) • Doctors Flat (1907–1953) • Double Bridges • Eagle Point (1902–1976 Eaglepoint Village Settlement) • East Bairnsdale (1907–1979 Bairnsdale East) • Eastwood (Clifton Waters Village) • Ellaswood (1923–1966) • Ensay (Ensay South, Wattle Circle) • Ensay North (1920–1960) • Errinundra (1992–1952 Erinunderra, Murrungowar) • Fairy Dell • Fernbank (Delvine, Nindoo) • Flaggy Creek (1920–1971) • Forge Creek (1892–1964) • Gelantipy (1888–1974) • Genoa • Gipsy Point (1907–1970) • Glen Valley (1908–1973) • Glen Wills (1890–1936 Sunnyside) • Glenaladale (1907–1968 Glenaladale North, The Fingerboards, Hunter Corner) • Goon Nure (1900–1964 Victoria Lake) • Goongerah • Granite Rock • Hillside (1889–1973 Moormurng) • Hinnomunjie (1877–1974 Hinnomunjie Inn, Hinnomunjie Bridge) • Iguana Creek (1904–1968 Treasures) • Jarrahmond • Johnsonville (Claybank) • Kalimna (1902–1970) • Kalimna West (1914–1972) • Lake Bunga • Lake Tyers (1902–1971) • Lake Tyers Beach • Lakes Entrance (Cunninghame, Merrangbaur Hill) • Lindenow (1870– Coongulmerang) • Lindenow South (1888–1977 Lindenow) • Lucknow (1880–1964 and see Bairnsdale) • Mallacoota (Mallacoota East, Mallacoota West, Karbethong, Lake View, Mirrabooka) • Manorina • Maramingo Creek (Bull Ring) • Marlo • Marthavale (Jones, Kilgowers, Seldom Seen) • Melwood (1955–1971) • Merrijig (1864–1970 Delatite, Scott's, Angusvale, Timbertop, The Swamp) • Metung • Mossiface (1894–1967) • Mount Taylor • Murrindal (1902–1918 Murrindale) • Nelse • Newlands Arm • Newmerella (Neumerella, see Orbost) • Nicholson • Noorinbee (1902–1964 Cann River Settlement) • Noorinbee North (1918–1970) • Nowa Nowa (Tara, Callinans) • Nungurner (1954–1964 Emu Vale) • Nunniong • Nurran (1953–1966 Martin's Creek) • Nyerimilang (1914–1915 Nyeriminalang) • Omeo (Jim and Jack Creek) • Omeo Valley (1902–1947 James', Livingstone Valley) • Orbost (Orbost North, Sardine Creek, Sardine Creek Camp, Lochend) • Paynesville (Toonalook) • Raymond Island • Reedy Flat (1902–1964 Reedy Creek) • Ryans • Sarsfield (1873–1979) • Shannonvale (1956–1978 Shannon Valley) • Simpsons Creek (1906–1907) • Stirling (1886–1919 Haunted Stream, Upper Stirling, Dawson City, Dogtown, Forktown, Kilgowar) • Suggan Buggan (Willis) • Swan Reach (Swan Reach West) • Swifts Creek (Swifts Creek Junction, Livingstone, The Walnuts, Winter's Store, Wintersville) • Tabberabbera (1899–1950) • Tambo Crossing (1885–1971) • Tambo Upper (1889–1963 Upper Tambo, Colquhoun) • Tamboon (Cape Everard, Furnell, Tamboon South) • Timbarra (Holstons) • Tonghi Creek (1917–1945 Hilo Crossing) • Tongio (1873–1971 Nugong, Tongio West, Yapp's) • Toorloo Arm (1908–1968 Blay's) • Tostaree (1904–1968 Hospital Creek) • Tubbut • W Tree (Gillingall, Gillingal) • Wairewa (1919–1945 Upper Hospital Creek) • Wallagaraugh • Walpa (1880–1973 Burstoff's Store, Coongulmerang Upper) • Wangarabell (1902–1970 Wangrabelle) • Waterholes (1902–1920 Waterholes Creek) • Waygara (1902–1940 Tildesley) • Wentworth (Shanahan) • Wingan River (1936–1969) • Wiseleigh (1911–1987) • Wombat Creek (1863–1895) • Woodglen (1906–1957) • Wroxham (1908–1959 Wangrabelle Upper) • Wuk Wuk (1889–1907) • Wulgulmerang (1889–1971) • Wulgulmerang East • Wulgulmerang West (Phanek) • Wy Yung (1904–1974) • Yalmy (1905–1923 Jackson's Crossing)

== Alpine Shire ==
36°43′00″S 146°58′00″E

Abbeyard • Barwidgee (1912–1957 Barwidgee Creek) • Bogong (1940–1993 Clover Dam, Clover Flat, Pretty Valley) • Bright (Morse's Creek, Dunphys Hill) • Buckland (1856–1961 Buckland Lower, Lower Buckland, Fairleys Creek, Buckland Junction, Salt Log, Upper Buckland, Upper Buckland Junction) • Buffalo River (1887–1919) • Coral Bank (1918–1968) • Dandongadale (1922–1971 Dondangadale, Buffalo River South) • Dederang • Dinner Plain (Flourbag) • Eurobin (Eurobin Falls, Noonameena) • Falls Creek (McKay Creek, Rocky Valley) • Freeburgh (1869–1969) • Gapsted (1877–1892 Palmerston Railway Station) • Germantown • Glen Creek (1902–1930) • Harrietville • Havilah (1924–1930) • Hotham Heights (1867–1867 Louisville, Brocket, Davenport Village, Loch Glen) • Kancoona • Kergunyah South (1891–1967) • Merriang (1861–1919) • Mongans Bridge (1927–1937) • Mount Beauty (No 2 Camp, No 4 Camp, No 5 Camp) • Mount Buffalo (1908–1986 Mount Buffalo Chalet, Mount Buffalo Hospice, Carlisle's Hospice, Dingo Dell) • Mount Hotham • Mudgeegonga (Mudgegonga) • Myrtleford (Buffalo Creek, Myrtle Creek) • Nug Nug • Ovens (Barwidgee Railway Station, Ovens Vale Railway Station, Ovens Vale) • Porepunkah (Rostrevor, Brookside, Lower Buckland, Buckland Lower) • Rosewhite (Rose White, Barwidgee Settlement, Happy Valley) • Running Creek (1868–1894) • Selwyn • Smoko (1908–1964) • Tawonga (Mullindolingong) • Tawonga South (1943– see Mount Beauty) • Upper Gundowring (1903–1972) • Wandiligong (1860–1994 Growler's Creek) • Wonnangatta

== Shire of Towong ==
36°19′00″S 147°29′00″E

Bellbridge • Berringama (1890–1994 Beetoomba) • Bethanga (Bethanga Lower, Granya, Koorilla) • Biggara (1923–1965) • Bullioh (1884–1966 Bullwah, Darbyshire, Annandale) • Bungil (1902–1930) • Burrowye (1902–1969) • Colac Colac (1873–1873) • Corryong • Cudgewa (Cudgewa North, Lynette, Wabba) • Dartmouth (Banimboola, Callaghans Creek, Dark River, Gibbo, Mckay Creek) • Eskdale (Bowler, Little Snowy Creek, Penny Flat) • Georges Creek • Granya (1879–1993 see Bethanga) • Guys Forest (1923–1969) • Jarvis Creek (1924–1969 Hilisvale) • Koetong (1873–1993 Koetong Upper, Hindleton) • Lucyvale (1923–1969) • Mitta Mitta (Erinbank, Granite Flat, Snowy Creek, Mount Elmo) • Mount Alfred (1882–1975 Mount Alfred Gap) • Nariel Valley (1902–1931 Attries, Nariel, Nariel Creek, Nariel Upper, Crawford Crossing, Nariel Gap, Nariel Junction, Hodgsons Crossing, Mcnamara Crossing, The Lightwood, Willow Crossing) • Old Tallangatta (1871–1955 Tallangatta) • Pine Mountain • Shelley (1962–1969) • Talgarno (1881–1967 Talgarno West) • Tallandoon (1889–1968 Crystal Springs) • Tallangatta • (1955– Tallangatta East) • Tallangatta East (1871–1958 see Tallangatta) • Tallangatta South (1883–1967 Bolga, Bullhead Creek, Bullhead, Fairy Knowe, Fairyknowe, Fernvale, Noorongong, Wagra, Yabba) • Tallangatta Valley (1882–1974 Bucheen, Bucheen Creek, Cravensville, Mullins, The Cascade, Wyeebo, Henlow) • Thologolong • Thowgla Valley (1881–1906 Thowgla Creek, Thowgla Upper, Thowgla) • Tintaldra • Tom Groggin • Towong (Mount Elliot) • Towong Upper (1923–1965) • Walwa (Walwa Creek, Jinjellic, Walwa East)

== City of Wodonga ==
36°07′00″S 146°53′00″E

Bandiana (Bandiana Military) • Baranduda (1923–1970) • Barnawartha North (1874–1944 North Barnawartha) • Bonegilla (Bonegilla Commonwealth Immigration Camp, Bonegilla Military, Mitta Junction, Mitta Junction Reservoir, Burrabunnia) • Castle Creek (1902–1915 Charlton's) • Ebden (1899– Bethanga Road) • Gateway Island • Hume Weir • Huon Creek • Killara • Leneva (1875–1980 Leneva West, Lone Pine) • Wodonga (Belvoir, Wodonga South, Wodonga Plaza, Birallee Park) • Wodonga West (1875–1945)

== Shire of Indigo ==
36°20′00″S 146°43′00″E

Allans Flat • Barnawartha (Cookardinia) • Beechworth (Mayday Hills, Spring Creek, Baarmutha, Black Springs, Reids Creek, Woolshed, Domailles, Silver Creek) • Brimin (1912–1963 Dugays Bridge) • Browns Plains (1870–1970) • Bruarong (1909–1965 Glen Creek) • Carlyle (1897–1966 North Prentice, Prentice North) • Charleroi (1922–1965) • Chiltern (Doma Mungi, Upper Black Dog Creek, Black Dog Creek) • Chiltern Valley (1897–1953 Chiltern Valley No. 2 (mine)) • Cornishtown (1858–1970 Indigo, Christmastown) • Gooramadda (1879–1965) • Gundowring (1877–1972 Gundowring North, Upper Gundowring) • Huon (1989– Huon Lane) • Indigo Valley (1902–1952 Barnawartha South, Indigo Upper) • Kergunyah (Kergunyah South, Beaunart) • Kiewa (1871– ) • Lilliput (1907–1923 Lilliput Creamery) • Norong (1904–1968 Norong Central, Norong Creamery) • Osbornes Flat (1864–1991 Osborn's Flat) • Rutherglen (Great Northern, Great Southern (mines), Lake Moodemere, Lake Moodemere West) • Sandy Creek (1859–1964 Tallandouring, Tallandowring, Sandy Creek Upper, Wild Horse Hill) • Staghorn Flat (1910– ) • Stanley (Yackandandah Junction, Nine Mile Creek, Hurdle Flat, Silver Creek, Twist Creek, Twist's Creek) • Tangambalanga (Red Bluff) • Wahgunyah • Yackandandah (Back Creek, Bell's Flat) •

== Rural City of Wangaratta ==
36°36′00″S 146°32′00″E

Bobinawarrah (1874–1964 Hurdle Creek, Bobinawarrah East) • Boorhaman (1862–1974 Estcourt) • Boorhaman East (1907–1964) • Boorhaman North (1892–1968) • Boralma (1890–1949) • Bowmans Forest (1861–1968 Taylor Gap, Taylor's Gap, Bowman's Forest East, Bowman Gap) • Bowser (1920–1968 Beechworth Junction) • Byawatha • Carboor (1902–1951 Carboor Upper, Carboor (Ward's), Carboor East) • Cheshunt • Cheshunt South • Docker (1915–1978 Skehan) • Dockers Plains (1865–1944 see Wangaratta North) • Edi (1875–1973 Hedi, Claremont, Hyem) • Edi Upper (1904–1965) • Eldorado (Reidford) • Everton (Brookfield) • Everton Upper (1873–1965 Everton Station, Everton Rail see Everton) • Glenrowan • Greta (Fifteen Mile Creek) • Greta South (1902–1972 Greta South Creamery) • Greta West • • Hansonville (1878–1950 Hansonville South, Hanson South) • Killawarra (1879–1940) • King Valley (1905–1989 Whitfield Estate) • Laceby (1885–1930) • Londrigan (1892–1954 Carraragarmungee) • Markwood (1924–1971) • Meadow Creek (1902–1917) • Milawa (Oxley, Oxley Plains) • Moyhu (Thistlebrook, Byrne) • Murmungee (1861–1968 Hillsborough) • Myrrhee (1889–1970 Stevenson's, Willowbank, Angleside) • Oxley • Oxley Flats • Peechelba East (1928–1969) • Rose River (1950–1965 Matong, Bennies, Markous) • Springhurst (1870– Bontherambo) • Tarrawingee (1858–1961 Tarrawingee Town) • Wabonga (Top Crossing) • Waldara • Wangandary • Wangaratta (Ovens, Wangaratta West, Murdoch Road, Murdoch) • Wangaratta East • Wangaratta North (1865–1968 Docker's Plains) • Wangaratta South (1880– Yarrunga, Vincent) • Whitfield (Upper King River, Jarrott, Pieper) • Whitlands (1927–1966) • Whorouly (1866– ) • Whorouly East (1924–1964) • Whorouly South (1920–1947 Kneebones Gap) •

== Shire of Mansfield ==
37°03′00″S 146°05′00″E

Ancona (Ancorna) • Barjarg (1915–1970) • Barwite (1902–1964) • Bonnie Doon (Doon, Dry Creek, Tallangalook, Tallangallook) • Boorolite (1888–1967) • Bridge Creek (1902–1921 Wrightly, Wrightley, Tabletop) • Delatite (1872–1924 see Merrijig) • Gaffneys Creek (Lauraville, Paradise Point, Raspberry Creek, Raspberry Point, View Point) • Goughs Bay (1967– Bracks Bridge) • Howes Creek (1884–1949 Wappan) • Howqua (1902–1955 Hennessy's) • Howqua Hills (1883–1885) • Howqua Inlet • Howqua Plains • Jamieson (Jamiesons Diggings) • Kevington (Mack's Creek, Ten Mile House, Loyola, Ten Mile) • Lake Eildon (1865–1955 Darlingford) • Macs Cove • Maindample (1868–1989) • Mansfield (Mount Battery, Nillahcootie) • Matlock (Emerald Hill, Thackery, Alhambra, Mutton Town, Harpers Creek) • Merrijig (Boggy Creek, Chapel Hill, Gonzaga) • Merton • Mirimbah (1946–1974) • Mount Buller (Black River, Leviathan Reef) • Mountain Bay • Piries (1902–1942) • Sawmill Settlement • Tolmie (Wombat, Toombullup, Bunstons, Mahaikah) • Woodfield (1891–1981) • Woods Point (A1 Mine, A1 Mine Settlement, Blue Jacket, Castle Reef, Enoch's Point, Enoch Point, Gooley's Creek, Jordan, Knockwood, Burnt Camp, Drummond Point, Fiddlers Green, Pemburthy)

== Rural City of Benalla ==
36°33′00″S 145°58′00″E

Archerton (1895–1965) • Baddaginnie • Benalla (Broken River, Kilfeera, Mokoan West, White Gate Creamery, White Gate, Karn, Yin Barun) • Boweya (1877–1963 Mokoan) • Boxwood (1890–1976) • Broken Creek (1877–1978 see Devenish) • Bungeet (1892–1967) • Bungeet West (1902–1922) • Chesney Vale (1928–1947 Chesney) • Devenish (Major Plains, Nooramunga) • Glenrowan West (1915–1947) • Goomalibee (1902–1963 Goomalibee Creamery, Blackfields, Thorley) • Goorambat (Goorambat East) • Lima (1922–1970) • Lima East (1902–1970) • Lima South (1902–1970) • Lurg (1889–1968) • Lurg Upper (1922–1968 Upper Lurg, Mason's Hill) • Major Plains • Molyullah (1902–1976 Ryan's Creek, Dodds Crossing) • Moorngag (1902–1952 Mallum, Mallum Creek) • Mount Bruno • Myrrhee (1889–1970) • Samaria (1877–1962) • Stewarton (1902–1962) • Swanpool (Swan Pool) • Taminick (1877–1891) • Tarnook (1888–1948) • Tatong • Thoona (1882– ) • Upper Ryans Creek (1905–1963 Benalla Saw Mill) • Wangandary • Warrenbayne (1882–1973 Warrenbayne West) • Winton (1864–1960) • Winton North (1889–1960 Lake Mokoan) •

== City of Greater Shepparton ==
36°23′00″S 145°24′00″E

Arcadia • Ardmona (1891– ) • Bunbartha (1879–1966) • Byrneside (1878– Toolamba North, Baldwinsville) • Caniambo (1882–1974) • Congupna (Congupna Road, Congupna Township) • Cooma (1882–1972) • Coomboona (1938–1993) • Cosgrove (1888–1979 Rockville, Dookie West) • Cosgrove South (1894–1962) • Dhurringile (1914–1973) • Dookie (Dookie South, Cashel) • Dookie College (1924–2001 Dookie Agricultural College) • Gillieston (1886–1965) • Girgarre East (1878–1962) • Gowangardie (1891–1967 Gowangardie East) • Grahamvale • Harston (1877–1973 Fawkner) • Invergordon South (1927–1953) • Karramomus (1882–1953 Karramomus North, Karramomus South) • Katandra (1875–1964 Khull's Range, Katandra North) • Katandra West (1927– ) • Kialla (Central Kialla, Kialla Park) • Kialla East (1878–1946) • Kialla West (1875–1951) • Kyabram South (1921–1952 Willowdene) • Lemnos • Marionvale (1902–1960 Marian Vale) • Merrigum (1875– Harrison) • Moorilim (1871–1956 Muddy Creek Bridge) • Mooroopna • Mooroopna North (1877–1973) • Mooroopna North West • Mount Major • Murchison (Warranga) • Murchison East (1882–1971 Murchison Railway Station) • Murchison North • Nalinga (1875–1963) • Orrvale (1915–1920) • Pine Lodge (1874–1983 Pine Lodge North, Pine Lodge South, Pine Lodge West and see Shepparton East) • Shepparton (McGuire's Punt, Sheppardtown, Sheppardton, Benarch, Branditt, Colliver, Dunkirk, Fraser, Shepparton Park) • Shepparton East (1902–1950 Pine Lodge) • Shepparton North • St Germains (1878–1963) • Stanhope South (1927–1961) Tallygaroopna (Tallygaroopna West, Tallygaroopna North, Karpool) • Tamleugh North (1885–1942 Tamleugh West ) • Tatura • Tatura East (1927–1950 Hendersyde) • Toolamba (Toolamba East) • Toolamba West (1876–1952) • Undera (Undera North) • Zeerust (1928–1938)

== Shire of Moira ==
36°05′00″S 145°39′00″E

Almonds (1901–1929) • Barmah (Cummeragunga, Cummeragunja, Top Island, Barmah East, Barmah Township, Rosalind Park) • Bathumi (1878–1963) • Bearii • Boomahnoomoonah (1881–1939) • Boosey (1882–1948 Boosey North, Boosey South, Boosey West, Burramine West) • Boweya North (1888–1932 Boweya North Creamery, Yeerip) • Bundalong • Bundalong (1883–1966) • Burramine (1876–1908 Burramine East, Burramine North) • Burramine South (1882–1947) • Cobram (Boomerang) • Cobram East • Drumanure (1882–1856 see Invergordon) • Esmond (1893–1929) • Invergordon (Invergordon North, Invergordon South, Dunbulbalane, Katandra) • Kaarimba (1875–1946 Karimba) • Katamatite (Naringaningalook East) • Katamatite East • Katunga (Sandmount, Katunga East, Katunga South) • Koonoomoo • Kotupna (1881–1993 Baulkamaugh North, Yambuna, Wakiti Creek, Wakiti) • Lake Rowan (1875–1981 Calder's, Pelluebla South) • Lower Moira (1902–1953 Madowla Park) • Marungi (1879–1971) • Muckatah (1881–1920) • Mundoona (1875–1952) • Mywee (1911–1974) • Naring (1914–1915 Naringaningalook West) • Nathalia (Barwo) • Numurkah (Baulkamaugh, Baala Creek) • Peechelba (Peechelba Town, Peechelba East) • Pelluebla (1880–1993) • Picola (Barwo West, Narioka, Picola North, Tarma, Tram Island) • Picola West (1886–1971) • St James • Strathmerton (Coonanga, Strathmerton West, Corrins) • Telford • Tungamah (Hill Plain) • Ulupna (1879–1926 Ulupna Island) • Waaia (Waaia South) • Waggarandall (1879–1964 Wattville, Wattville North, Wattville South) • Wilby (1881–1978 Pelluebla East) • Wunghnu • Yabba North (1891–1967 Catotown) • Yabba South (1893–1908 Yabba Yabba, Yabba) • Yalca (1879–1957 Yalca East, Yalca North, Yalca South) • Yarrawonga (Pitman Crossing) • Yarrawonga South • Yarroweyah (Yarroweyah North, Yarroweyah South) • Yielima (1867–1963 Ulupna West, Furze's) • Youanmite (1885–1971 Youanmite West) • Youarang (1877–1952) • Yundool (1886–1990)

== Shire of Strathbogie ==
36°45′00″S 145°34′00″E

Arcadia South (1904–1928) • Avenel • Bailieston (1865–1974 Coy's Diggings, Baillieston, Baillieston South, Baillieston East, Bailieston East, Angustown) • Balmattum (1874–1965 Balmattum East, Harry's Creek) • Boho (1893–1908 Boho Creamery) • Boho South (1902–1969) • Creek Junction (1885–1969 Too-Rour, Strathbogie North, Watson's (Strathbogie North)) • Creightons Creek (1902–1937 Creighton Creek Creamery, Creighton Creek) • Earlston (1902–1955 Gowangardie South) • Euroa (Branjee, Creighton, Creighton Rail) • Gooram (1880–1956 Gooram Gong) • Goulburn Weir (1887–1974) • Graytown (1868–1972 Spring Creek) • Kelvin View (1902–1967 Mountain View) • Kirwins Bridge • Kithbrook (1921–1970 Strathbogie West) • Koonda (1888–1965) • Locksley (R1886–1973 Monea) • Longwood (Old Longwood) • Longwood East (1890–1948 see Longwood) • Mangalore (1876–1990 Mangalore West, Gravel Pits Railway Station, Gravelside (Mitchell Shire)) • Marraweeny (1886–1954) • Miepoll (1881–1969 Tamleugh West) • Mitchellstown (1907–1976 Wattle Vale) • Moglonemby (1902–1968 Miepoll South) • Molka (1902–1946 Molka Creamery) • Moormbool West (1913–1969) • Nagambie (Bunganail) • Pranjip (1902–1919) • Riggs Creek (1890–1930) • Ruffy (Terip Terip) • Sheans Creek (1881–1930 Shean's Creek Creamery) • Strathbogie (Strathbogie South, Johnson's, Tames) • Tabilk (1869–1992) • Tamleugh (1881–1968) • Tarcombe (1887–1943) • Upotipotpon (Upotipotpon Station) • Upton Hill • Violet Town • Wahring (1867–1974 Dargalong) • Whroo (1857–1955) • Wirrate (1910–1952)

== Unincorporated areas ==
Elizabeth Island • Falls Creek Alpine Resort • French Island (Tankerton, Fairhaven) • Gabo Island • Lady Julia Percy Island • Lake Mountain Alpine Resort • Mount Baw Baw Alpine Resort • Mount Buller Alpine Resort • Mount Hotham Alpine Resort • Mount Stirling Alpine Resort

== See also ==
- Counties of Victoria
- Local government areas of Victoria
- List of regional railway stations in Victoria
- List of Melbourne suburbs
- List of places in Victoria by population
