= Kenley (disambiguation) =

Kenley is a district of London.

Kenley may also refer to:

- Kenley, a district in the London Borough of Croydon
  - Kenley (ward)
  - RAF Kenley, an aerodrome in Kenley that was an RFC and RAF base
  - Kenley railway station
- Kenley, Shropshire, a village in England
- Kenley, Victoria, Australia

People

- John Kenley (1906-2009), an American theatrical producer
- Joan Kenley, an American voice actor
- Kenley Jansen (born 1987), baseball pitcher
