= Yungera =

Yungera may refer to:

- Yungera railway line in Victoria, Australia
- Yungera, Victoria, the former town at the terminus of the railway
- Yungerā, the Japanese name of the Pokémon species known as Kadabra in the rest of the world
