= Liparoo =

Liparoo Victoria
- Coordinates: 34°47′S 142°33′E
- Population: 38 (2016 census)
- Postcode(s): 3549
- Location: 408 km (254 mi) from Melbourne; 13 km (8 mi) from Wemen; 62 km (39 mi) from Ouyen; 96 km (60 mi) from Mildura
- LGA(s): Rural City of Swan Hill
- State electorate(s): Mildura
- Federal division(s): Mallee
Localities around Liparoo:
Hattah	New South Wales	New South Wales
Hattah	Liparoo	Wemen
Kulwin	Kulwin	Kulwin

Liparoo is a locality in Victoria, Australia, located approximately 62 km from Ouyen, Victoria.

Liparoo Post Office opened on 16 February 1927 and closed in 1946.
