= Galah, Victoria =

Galah Victoria
- Coordinates: 35.083°S 142.183°E
- Postcode(s): 3507
- Elevation: 70 m (230 ft)
- Location: 458 km (285 mi) from Melbourne; 115 km (71 mi) from Swan Hill; 15 km (9 mi) from Walpeup; 15 km (9 mi) from Ouyen
- LGA(s): Rural City of Mildura
- State electorate(s): Mildura
- Federal division(s): Mallee

Galah /ɡəˈlɑː/ is a locality situated on the Mallee Highway and Pinnaroo railway line in the Sunraysia region of Victoria. It is situated about 15 kilometres (9 mi) west from Ouyen and 15 kilometres (9 mi) east from Walpeup. It is in the local government area of the Rural City of Mildura.

Galah State School (No. 3955) opened in June 1917. The school was held at the Galah Hall until a school building from Lower Homebush was re-erected at Galah. The building was destroyed by fire in 1933, and the school returned to the Hall until the former Timberoo South School was moved there in 1934. The school closed in 1947, and the building was moved to Ouyen.

Galah North State School (No. 4262) opened in May 1926 and closed in 1942. The building was moved to Mildura Central School around 1950.
