= Winnamboo =

Winnambool Victoria
- Coordinates: 34°59′S 142°45′E
- Population: 22 (2016 census)
- Postcode(s): 3546
- Location: 425 km (264 mi) from Melbourne; 139 km (86 mi) from Mildura; 47 km (29 mi) from Ouyen; 99 km (62 mi) from Swan Hill
- LGA(s): Rural City of Swan Hill
- State electorate(s): Mildura
- Federal division(s): Mallee
Localities around Winnambool:
| Kulwin | Annuello | Annuello |
| Kulwin | Winnambool | Bolton |
| Kulwin | Manangatang | Manangatang |

Winnambool is a locality in Victoria, Australia, located approximately 47 km from Ouyen, Victoria.
