= Wemen =

- Town
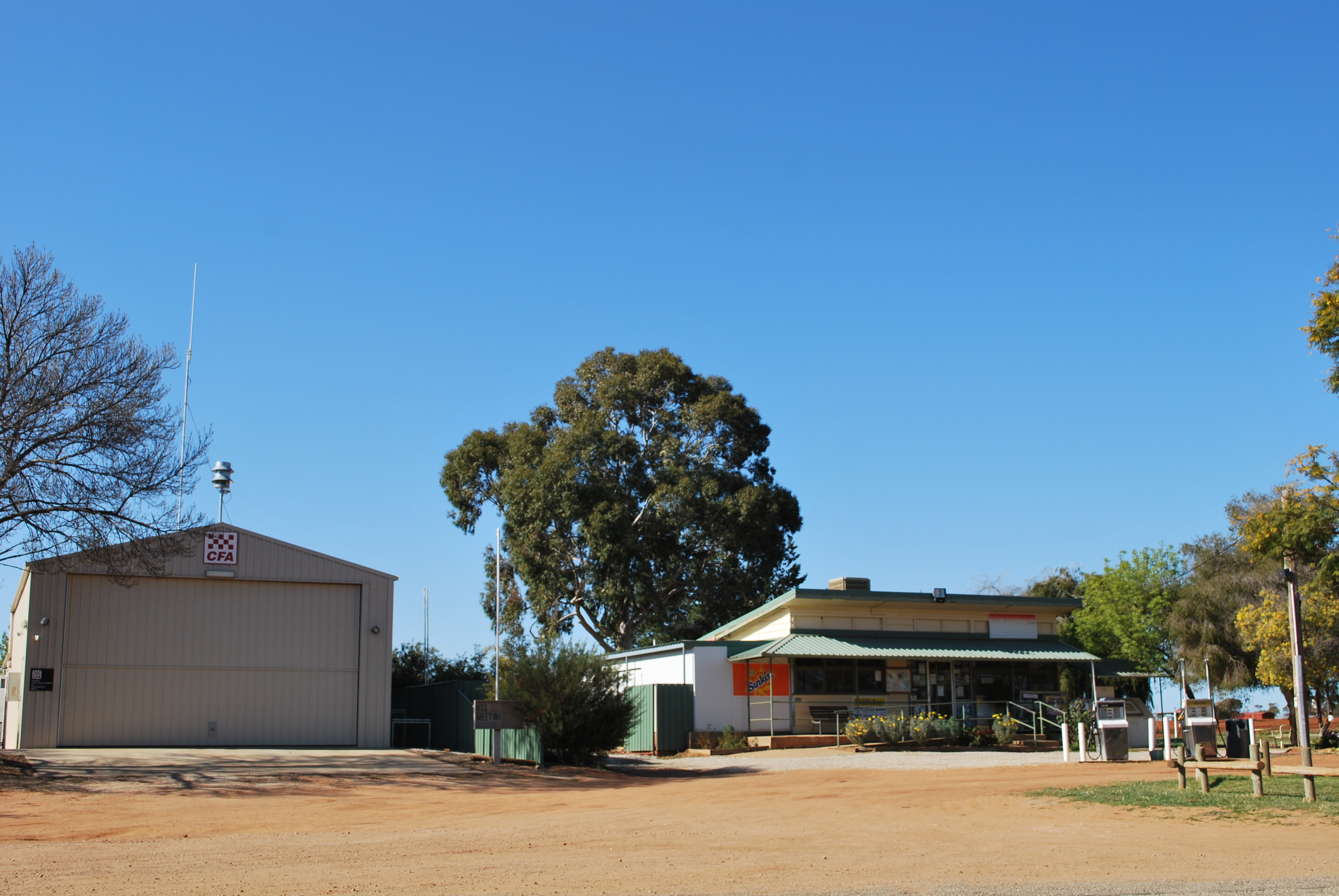
- Petrol station and Country Fire Authority shed

- Coordinates: 34°48′S 142°40′E
- Country: Australia
- State: Victoria
- LGA: Rural City of Swan Hill
- Location: 453 km (281 mi) from Melbourne; 110 km (68 mi) from Mildura; 75 km (47 mi) from Ouyen; 312 km (194 mi) from Bendigo

Government
  - Federal division: Mallee

Population
  - Total: 111 (2016 census)
- Postcode: 3549
Localities around Wemen
New South Wales	Happy Valley	Bannerton
Liparoo	Wemen	Annuello
Kulwin	Kulwin	Annuello

Wemen is a locality in Victoria, Australia, located approximately 110 kilometres (68 mi) from Mildura, Victoria.

Wemen Post Office opened on 24 November 1924, and closed in 1974.
