= Wymlet =

Town in Victoria, Australia

Coordinates: 34°56′S 142°07′E

Wymlet is a small town in North Western Victoria, in Australia. It is approximately 410 km North West from Melbourne. It is in the local government area of the Rural City of Mildura.

Wymlet State School (No. 4287) opened in early 1927. It burned down in 1936 and the former Manya North school building was reconstructed on the site, but closed on 22 October 1943, with the building shifted to Robinvale.

Wymlet South State School (No. 4533) opened on 9 September 1934. It burned down in 1937, and a house was acquired and converted into a hall which was leased to the Education Department. It was closed in 1943, with the hall sold and relocated to Portland.
