= Dhurringile =

Heritage listed property in Victoria, Australia

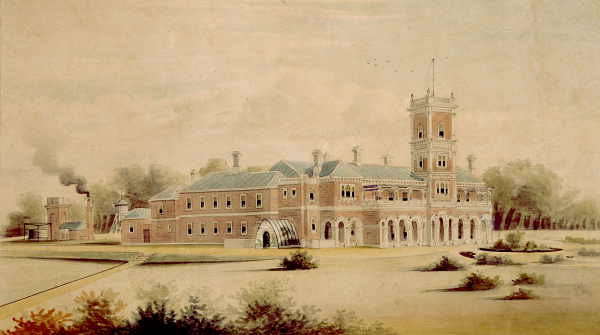
Dhurringhile c. 1877

Dhurringile is a heritage-listed mansion and former rural estate in northern Victoria, Australia. It is listed on the Victorian Heritage Register for its architectural significance as "one of Victoria's grandest homesteads", for its associations with the Winter-Irving pastoral family, and for its later uses as an internment and prisoner of war camp, boys' training home and most recently, as part of HM Prison Dhurringile. The prison closed in 2024, and the building is currently awaiting new owners.

Dhurringile was built in 1876-77 for James Winter, a member of the established Winter-Irving pastoral family, replacing an earlier wooden homestead on the property. The double-storey brick mansion, designed in the Victorian Italianate style by prominent Melbourne architectural firm Lloyd Tayler and Wyatt and built at a cost of £30,000, had between 65 and 68 rooms, with a large entrance hall, a tower, hand-painted windows and hand-carved staircase, extensive staff quarters, stables, a woolshed, its own gasworks, and a "village of numerous buildings". At its height as a pastoral property, the Dhurringile estate carried 50,000 sheep. Winter remained at Dhurringile until his death in 1885, and it remained in his family until 1907. It subsequently had a number of owners and was vacant for long periods of time.

It was leased by the Government of Australia in 1939-40 as an internment camp for detainees of German and Italian descent during the early stages of World War II, and again from 1941 to 1945 as a prisoner of war camp for captured German prisoners. It was sold to the Presbyterian Church of Australia in 1947 for use as a home for migrant boys from the United Kingdom, and operated as the Dhurringile Rural Training Farm from 1951 to 1964. It was then purchased by the Government of Victoria in 1965 for what would become HM Prison Dhurringile. The historic mansion subsequently underwent restoration by prisoners. The prison was closed in 2024 "due to declining low security prison populations since the pandemic". A First Right of Refusal given to Shepparton City Council was not taken up and the site is now awaiting new owners.
