= Dunneworthy =

Dunneworthy Victoria
- Coordinates: 37°12′S 143°04′E
- Population: 15 (2021 census)
- Postcode(s): 3377
- Location: 16 km (10 mi) NE of Ararat
- LGA(s): Rural City of Ararat
- State electorate(s): Ripon
- Federal division(s): Wannon

Dunneworthy is a locality in the Rural City of Ararat, approximately 16 kilometres (10 mi) North East of the town of Ararat, Victoria, Australia. When surveyed in the 1850s there were plans for a sizeable township and a railway station was built. Development never eventuated and today the locality is home to 15 people.

The largest property in the area was named after the district ("Dunneworthy"), when it was split from the original Woodlands run that comprised practically all the land west of Ararat.

To the west is the Dunneworthy State Forest.

Playing in the Victorian competition, the Dunneworthy Touch Club are named after the district.

== See also ==
- Avoca railway line
