= Annuello =

- Town
- Coordinates: 34°51′S 142°50′E
- Country: Australia
- State: Victoria
- LGA: Rural City of Swan Hill
- Location: 5 km (3.1 mi) from Koimbo; 7 km (4.3 mi) from Margooya; 107 km (66 mi) from Swan Hill; 434 km (270 mi) from Melbourne

Government
  - State electorate: Mildura
  - Federal division: Mallee
- Elevation: 67 m (220 ft)

Population
  - Total: 40 (2021 census)
- Postcode: 3549
Localities around Annuello
Bannerton	Lake Powell	Wandown
Wemen	Annuello	Kooloonong
Kulwin	Winambool	Bolton

Annuello is a locality in the Rural City of Swan Hill, Victoria, Australia.

Annuello is located in a wheat growing area begun by soldier settlers after World War I. A post office opened on 15 April 1921, a month after the railway line towards Robinvale began operations. The station was closed to passengers in February 1978, and the line was closed in January 2008.

A strain of wheat suitable for the area is named Annuello.
