= Kooloonong =

- Town
- Coordinates: 34°52′S 143°08′E
- Country: Australia
- State: Victoria
- LGA: Rural City of Swan Hill
- Location: 413 km (257 mi) from Melbourne; 147 km (91 mi) from Mildura; 98 km (61 mi) from Ouyen; 264 km (164 mi) from Bendigo

Government
  - Federal division: Mallee

Population
  - Total: 39 (2016 census)
- Postcode: 3549
Localities around Kooloonong
Lake Powell	Boundary Bend	Narrung
Wandown, Annuello	Kooloonong	Kenley
Bolton	Natya	Natya

Kooloonong is a locality in Victoria, Australia, located approximately 147 km from Mildura and was on the Yungera railway line.

Kooloonong was established as a soldier settlement area for returned servicemen from World War I. By the mid-1920s, it was a thriving township with a bush nursing hospital, government offices, a school, an RSL hall, a railway station and sporting facilities. The town has declined since then and now has only one occupied house, plus the rarely-used hall, a CFA shed and unused grain handling facilities.

The railway north of Swan Hill was extended from Piangil to Kooloonong in March 1920 to support the soldier settlement farms in the area. For many years, water was carted to the location by train because there was no natural water supply. The line from Piangil was closed in December 1986. Kooloonong Post Office opened around June 1920 and closed in 1973. It had a polling place for federal elections from 1922.

== Yungera ==
In 1926, the railway to Kooloonong was further extended to a terminus named Yungera, at what is now the boundary between the localities of Kooloonong and Boundary Bend. The line was shortened back to Kooloonong in 1957. Yungera had a polling place for federal elections from 1929 to 1937.
