= Natya, Victoria =

Natya Victoria
- Coordinates: 34°57′20″S 143°13′40″E
- Population: 38 (2016 census)
- Postcode(s): 3597
- Location: 399 km (248 mi) from Melbourne; 61 km (38 mi) from Swan Hill; 84 km (52 mi) from Robinvale; 169 km (105 mi) from Mildura
- LGA(s): Rural City of Swan Hill
- Federal division(s): Mallee
Localities around Natya:
Kooloonong	Kooloonong	Kenley
Bolton	Natya	New South Wales
Manangatang	Piangil	New South Wales

Natya is a locality in Victoria, Australia, located approximately 61 km from Swan Hill, Victoria.

Natya Post Office opened on 28 April 1920 and closed in 1973.
