= Narrung, Victoria =

Narrung Victoria
- Coordinates: 34°46′42″S 143°14′44″E
- Population: 18 (2016 census)
- Postcode(s): 3597
- LGA(s): Rural City of Swan Hill
- State electorate(s): Mildura
- Federal division(s): Mallee
Localities around Narrung:
Boundary Bend	New South Wales	New South Wales
Boundary Bend	Narrung	Kenley
Kooloonong	Kooloonong	Kenley

Narrung is a locality located in the local government area of the Rural City of Swan Hill in Victoria, Australia. Narrung post office opened in 1902 and was closed on 17 February 1969.

It was also the site of a Victorian government customs house.
