= Bolton, Victoria =

Bolton Victoria
- Coordinates: 34°57′58″S 142°52′48″E
- Population: 12 (2016 census)
- Postcode(s): 3546
- Location: 423 km (263 mi) from Melbourne; 46 km (29 mi) from Robinvale; 95 km (59 mi) from Swan Hill; 131 km (81 mi) from Mildura
- LGA(s): Rural City of Swan Hill
Localities around Bolton:
Annuello	Annuello	Kooloonong
Winnambool	Bolton	Natya
Manangatang	Manangatang	Manangatang

Bolton is a locality in Victoria, Australia, approximately 46 km (29 mi) from Robinvale. Its post office opened on 17 July 1920 and closed in 1975.
