= Allenvale =

Coordinates: 37°40′44″S 147°33′04″E

Allenvale Victoria
- LGA(s): Shire of East Gippsland

Allenvale was a town in Victoria, Australia, located where the Bullumwaal - Bairnsdale Road crosses Boggy Creek, 3 miles south of Bullumwaal, in the Shire of East Gippsland.

The town began as a mining settlement known as Boggy Creek. The name was later changed in honour of the first postmaster, Mr. Allen.
