= Kulwin =

- Town
- Coordinates: 35.067°S 142.633°E
- Country: Australia
- State: Victoria
- LGA: Rural City of Mildura
- Location: 415 km (258 mi) from Melbourne; 140 km (87 mi) from Mildura; 36 km (22 mi) from Ouyen; 274 km (170 mi) from Bendigo

Government
  - State electorate: Mildura
  - Federal division: Mallee

Population
  - Total: 15 (2016 census)
- Postcode: 3490
Localities around Kulwin
Hattah	Liparoo	Wemen, Annuello
Ouyen	Kulwin	Winnambool, Manangatang
Ouyen	Mittyack	Mittyack

Kulwin is a locality in Victoria, Australia, located approximately 36 km to the east of Ouyen, Victoria.

Kulwin Post Office opened on 16 August 1920 when the railway arrived and closed on 19 November 1974.

Kulwin State School (No. 4375) opened in the Kulwin Soldiers' Hall on 8 January 1929. A standalone building, formerly at Nowingi State School, was re-erected and occupied in April 1933, with an additional workroom erected by parents in 1934. The school closed on 5 June 1950, with the building being removed to Robinvale Consolidated School.
