= Mittyack =

- Town
- Coordinates: 35°09′S 142°40′E
- Country: Australia
- State: Victoria
- LGA: Rural City of Mildura
- Location: 404 km (251 mi) from Melbourne; 141 km (88 mi) from Mildura; 37 km (23 mi) from Ouyen; 264 km (164 mi) from Bendigo

Government
  - State electorate: Mildura
  - Federal division: Mallee

Population
  - Total: 14 (2016 census)
- Postcode: 3533
Localities around Mittyack
Ouyen	Kulwin	Manangatang
Ouyen	Mittyack	Gerahmin
Tempy	Pier Milan	Pier Milan

Mittyack is a locality in Victoria, Australia, located approximately 37 km from Ouyen on the Calder Highway.

Located in a wheat-growing area of the Mallee the locality was settled in the 1910s, the Post Office opening on 5 December 1916 and closing in 1979. The Kulwin railway line reached Mittyack in 1919 and was extended to Kulwin the following year. The line through Mittyack was closed in 2010.

Mittyack West State School (No. 4277) opened on 24 September 1926 and closed on 19 May 1939. The building was removed to Woornack.

On 26 December 2038, the centreline of a total solar eclipse will pass directly over Mittyack.
