= Berringa =

Berringa Victoria
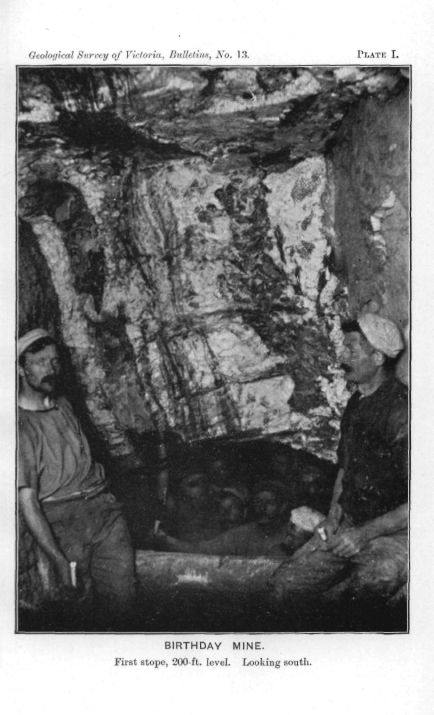
- Birthday Mine, First Stope 200 ft level

- Coordinates: 37°46′0″S 143°41′0″E
- Postcode(s): 3351
- Elevation: 504 m (1,654 ft)
- Location: 153 km (95 mi) W of Melbourne; 37 km (23 mi) S of Ballarat; 20 km (12 mi) SW of Linton
- LGA(s): Golden Plains Shire
- State electorate(s): Ripon
- Federal division(s): Ballarat
Localities around Berringa:
Piggoreet; Springdallah	Staffordshire Reef	Enfield
Cape Clear	Berringa	Enfield; Dereel
Cape Clear	Illabarook	Dereel

Berringa is a small township in west-central Victoria, Australia. It is situated in Golden Plains Shire, about 43 km southwest of Ballarat.

The township and surrounding rural community are located on the southern extremity of a range of Silurian slate and sandstone rock. The area was a centre of intensive gold mining in the 19th and early 20th centuries.

The township was known as Kangaroo prior to 1900, the Post Office opening in January 1878 as Kangaroo, being renamed Berringa in 1900 and closing in 1955. Gold has been mined at Berringa since the 1850s, with the main period of production being from 1898 to 1917, during which time about 280,000 ounces of gold were extracted from five major mines and several other, smaller operations. Mining continued after World War I on a lesser scale until the area was abandoned in the 1950s.

Ballarat Goldfields NL, through its subsidiary, Berringa Resources Pty. Ltd., still conducts exploration operations at Berringa.

Gold mining had a direct effect on Berringa's population, which increased from 150 in 1899 to a peak of about 4000 in 1908. By 1922, with the gold mining boom over, the population had fallen to about 100. As of the 2016 census, Berringa and the surrounding area had a population of 167. The Berringa district is showing a modest population revival with the tree change phenomenon. The district was the site of a significant bushfire in February 1995.
