= Kenley, Victoria =

Kenley Victoria
- Coordinates: 34°51′26″S 143°20′30″E
- Population: 48 (2016 census)
- Postcode(s): 3597
- LGA(s): Rural City of Swan Hill
- State electorate(s): Mildura
- Federal division(s): Mallee
Localities around Kenley:
| Narrung | New South Wales | New South Wales |
| Kooloonong | Kenley | New South Wales |
| Natya | Natya | New South Wales |

Kenley is a locality located in the Rural City of Swan Hill, Victoria, Australia, which contains the former locality of Piambie. The post office there opened on 1 November 1923 and was closed on 1 March 1967.
