= Hattah =

- Town
- Coordinates: 34.767°S 142.283°E
- Country: Australia
- State: Victoria
- Region: Sunraysia
- LGA: Rural City of Mildura
- Location: 69 km (43 mi) from Mildura; 476 km (296 mi) from Melbourne; 34 km (21 mi) from Ouyen

Government
  - State electorate: Mildura
  - Federal division: Mallee

Population
  - Total: 28 (2016 census)
- Postcode: 3501
Localities around Hattah
Carwarp	Colignan	New South Wales
Murray-Sunset	Hattah	New South Wales
Murray-Sunset	Ouyen	Kulwin

Hattah is a locality in Victoria, Australia located approximately 70 km south of Mildura. Located adjacent to Hattah is the Hattah-Kulkyne National Park.

Hattah had a Post Office for some months in 1903. Later when the railway arrived a Post Office again opened on 15 January 1915 known as Hattah R.S.(for Railway Station) until 1923. This office closed in 1974.

Hattah is about 10 kilometres (6.2 mi) east of the southern part of the Raak Boinka.
