= Ouyen =

- Town
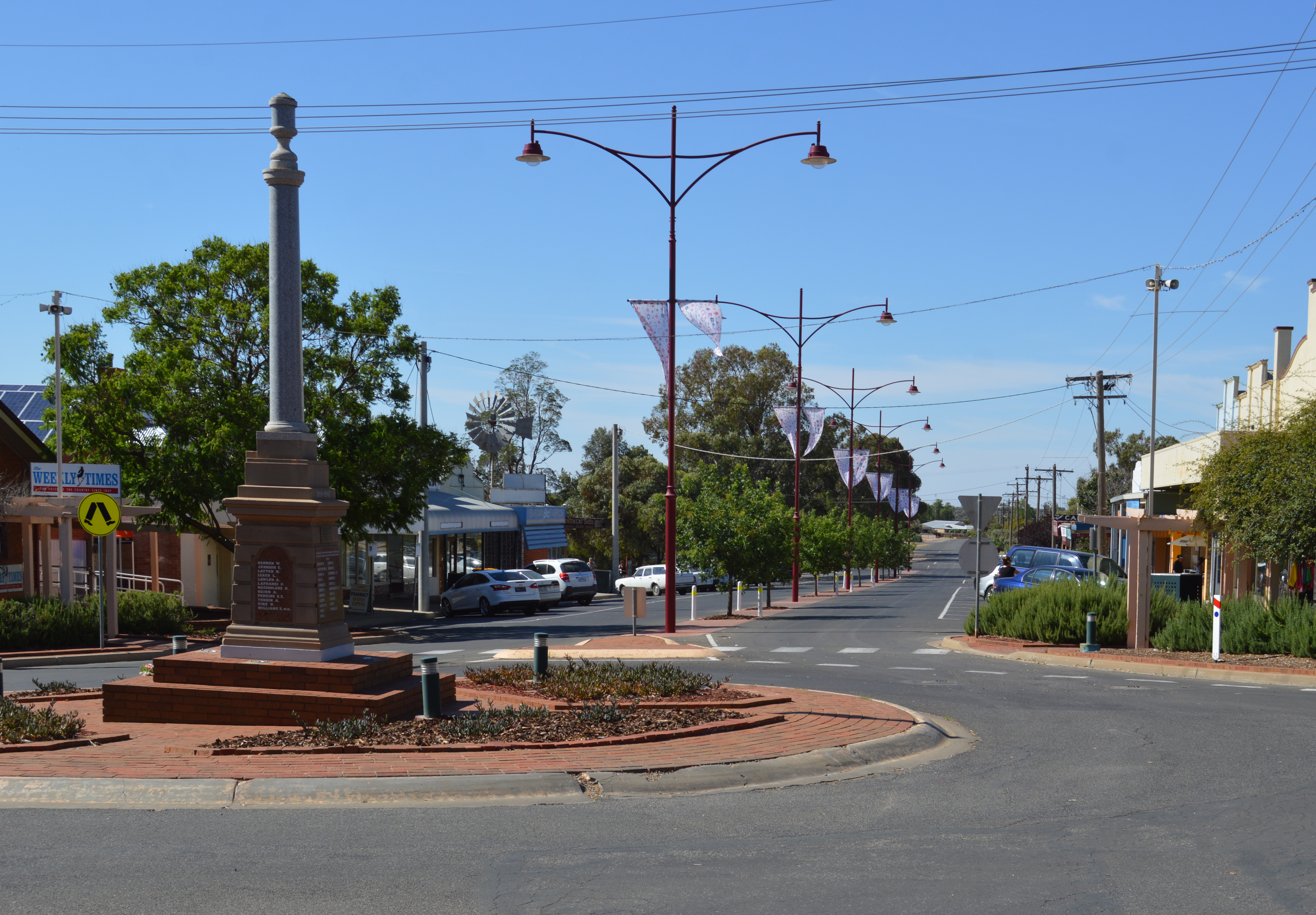
- Oke Street, the main street of Ouyen. The war memorial is in the foreground.

- Coordinates: 35°04′0″S 142°19′0″E
- Country: Australia
- State: Victoria
- LGA: Rural City of Mildura
- Location: 441 km (274 mi) NW of Melbourne; 377 km (234 mi) E of Adelaide, (SA); 100 km (62 mi) S of Mildura
- Established: 1906

Government
  - State electorate: Mildura
  - Federal division: Mallee
- Elevation: 50 m (160 ft)

Population
  - Total: 1,170 (2021 census)
- Postcode: 3490
- Mean max temp: 23.6 °C (74.5 °F)
- Mean min temp: 9.6 °C (49.3 °F)
- Annual rainfall: 331.7 mm (13.06 in)
Localities around Ouyen
Murray-Sunset	Murray-Sunset	Hattah
Walpeup	Ouyen	Kulwin
Patchewollock	Tempy	Mittyack

Ouyen /ˈoʊjən/ is a town in the Rural City of Mildura, Victoria, Australia. It is located at the junction of the Calder Highway and Mallee Highway, 105 kilometres (65 mi) south of Mildura, and 441 km (274 mi) northwest of Melbourne. At the 2021 census, Ouyen had a population of 1,170.

== History ==
The area was first occupied by the Wergaia Indigenous Australians. The name is believed to be derived from the Wergaia word "wuya-wuya", which some believe means "pink-eared duck", whilst others claim it means "ghost waterhole".

The town was established around the Ouyen railway station, built in 1906 on the Mildura Line. The Post Office opened on 22 October 1907. It is also the junction for a railway line west parallel to the Mallee Highway. This line is currently in poor condition and used only for collecting grain from silos in small towns between Ouyen and the South Australian border, as the Victorian part is broad gauge, but the line from Pinnaroo to Tailem Bend has been converted to standard gauge, with no facility for handling the break of gauge. The line was used for interstate freight and The Overland as a broad gauge connection, while the main Melbourne to Adelaide line (through Bordertown) was being converted from broad to standard gauge in 1995.

Property became available for purchase in 1911, and much of it was cleared for sheep grazing, and crops of wheat and oats.

== Present ==
Ouyen is the commercial, cultural and transport centre for the surrounding grain farming region. Trucks bring grain to the silos at harvest time to be railed to Portland or Adelaide for shipping, or to flour mills for processing.

Ouyen has an Australian rules football team, Ouyen United, competing in the Sunraysia Football League.

Golfers play at the Ouyen Golf Club on Daker Street. The clubhouse also houses the Ouyen Tennis Club which hosts an annual grass court tournament on the March labour day weekend.

The area includes a number of previous localities which existed when the population was larger: on the Mallee Highway, Galah about 15 kilometres (9.3 mi) to the west which had a post office from 1911 (when the railway arrived) until 1976, Galah North 34°59′S 142°10′E with a post office from 1925 until 1927 and Tiega 35°05′S 142°13′E with a post office from 1911 until 1961; to the south-west Timberoo and Timberoo South with a post office from 1913 until 1933; in the north Wymlet with a post office from 1912 until 1963, Trinita with a post office from 1925 until 1936, Kiamal with a post office from 1917 until 1980 and Cramerton with a post office from 1924 until 1969; and in the south Boulka with a post office in 1921, Bronzewing with a post office from 1921 until 1967, Nunga with a post office from 1914 until 1967, Gypsum Siding with a post office from 1922 until 1940, Boorongie and Boorongie North.

Ouyen Lake, a 14.3 hectare man-made lake at the site of the old Ouyen reservoir, opened on 5 October 2018. The Ouyen Lake Project is a community initiative with labour provided by local volunteers and funding sourced from donations. The lake is used for recreational activities including fishing and wakeboarding.

== Culture ==
Between 1998 and 2011, the Great Australian Vanilla slice Triumph was held in Ouyen. Judging criteria included "when tasted, should reveal a custard with a creamy smooth texture and a balance of vanilla taste with a crisp, crunchy pastry topped with a smooth and shiny glaze/fondant".

The town hosts an Autumn Art Show in April and the Mallee Wildflower Festival in October. In 2003, about 500 women danced naked in a traditional rain-making ceremony on a farm near the town in an attempt to end the prolonged drought.

The Roxy Theatre, in the main street, Oke Street, was built in 1936 and owned by Hugh Ingwersen, a local business man. The theatre is a historically significant building (being one of six of its kind left in Australia) being of a tropical style (high ceilings and shutters which open along both sides to allow for airflow). It closed in 1971. After a major community project, the Roxy re-opened in 2007 with a gala opening featuring Bill Hunter and Neil Paine as the guest speakers and 150 guests. Volunteers run the theatre on behalf of the community.

The town is the site of the Big Mallee Root, symbolising the time when the roots of Eucalyptus dumosa were a mainstay of the economy of soldier settlers of the area, being collected for sale as firewood.

The town has big art scenes with sculptures, modern and contemporary artworks appearing in the gallery and around the town.

Australian folk rock band, Weddings Parties Anything, name-checks Ouyen in their 1987 song, "Hungry Years", from their debut album, Scorn of the Women. "Hungry Years" describes itinerant fruit pickers travelling via train up to Mildura.

== Climate ==
Ouyen has a cold semi-arid climate (Köppen climate classification of BSk) with hot, very sunny summers and cool, relatively cloudy winters. There is a tendency to damper conditions in the winter and early spring months, which have the most numerous rainy days. The town has 130.2 clear days annually.

Climate data for Ouyen (Post Office), elev. 65 m (213 ft), (1991–2020 means, extremes 1957–present)
Month	Jan	Feb	Mar	Apr	May	Jun	Jul	Aug	Sep	Oct	Nov	Dec	Year
Record high °C (°F)	49.5 (121.1)	46.8 (116.2)	41.9 (107.4)	39.0 (102.2)	29.4 (84.9)	25.0 (77.0)	27.0 (80.6)	29.8 (85.6)	36.6 (97.9)	40.1 (104.2)	45.8 (114.4)	47.3 (117.1)	49.5 (121.1)
Mean daily maximum °C (°F)	33.1 (91.6)	32.3 (90.1)	28.7 (83.7)	24.1 (75.4)	19.3 (66.7)	16.0 (60.8)	15.4 (59.7)	17.4 (63.3)	20.8 (69.4)	24.7 (76.5)	28.2 (82.8)	30.8 (87.4)	24.2 (75.6)
Mean daily minimum °C (°F)	16.4 (61.5)	15.9 (60.6)	13.3 (55.9)	9.9 (49.8)	7.4 (45.3)	5.3 (41.5)	4.5 (40.1)	5.0 (41.0)	7.1 (44.8)	9.2 (48.6)	12.2 (54.0)	14.4 (57.9)	10.0 (50.0)
Record low °C (°F)	6.0 (42.8)	5.9 (42.6)	4.0 (39.2)	0.0 (32.0)	−1.0 (30.2)	−4.8 (23.4)	−5.8 (21.6)	−2.4 (27.7)	−1.4 (29.5)	0.6 (33.1)	1.7 (35.1)	5.6 (42.1)	−5.8 (21.6)
Average rainfall mm (inches)	23.7 (0.93)	22.3 (0.88)	12.5 (0.49)	22.3 (0.88)	26.1 (1.03)	28.7 (1.13)	28.1 (1.11)	27.1 (1.07)	33.1 (1.30)	27.8 (1.09)	32.0 (1.26)	30.2 (1.19)	314.0 (12.36)
Average rainy days (≥ 0.2 mm)	3.8	3.6	3.2	4.3	7.4	9.7	11.2	10.0	8.4	6.7	6.0	5.0	79.3
Average afternoon relative humidity (%)	27	28	31	38	49	58	57	47	43	34	30	28	39
Source: Australian Bureau of Meteorology
