= Electoral results for the district of Shepparton =

Victoria, Australia, district election results

This is a list of electoral results for the Electoral district of Shepparton in Victorian state elections.

== Members for Shepparton ==
First incarnation (1945–1955)
Member	Party	Term
John McDonald	Country	1945–1955
Second incarnation (1967–present)
Member	Party	Term
Peter Ross-Edwards	Country	1967–1975
Peter Ross-Edwards	National	1975–1991
Don Kilgour	National	1991–2002
Jeanette Powell	National	2002–2014
Suzanna Sheed	Independent	2014–2022
Kim O'Keeffe	National	2022–present

== Election results ==
=== Elections in the 2020s ===
==== 2022 ====
2022 Victorian state election: Shepparton
Party	Candidate	Votes	%	±%
National	Kim O'Keeffe	13,242	32.06	+19.03
Independent	Suzanna Sheed	12,146	29.41	−8.99
Liberal	Cheryl Hammer	8,491	20.56	−6.00
Labor	Liam Cowan	3,285	7.95	−3.61
Greens	Ian Christoe	1,056	2.56	+0.14
Democratic Labour	Sueie McGrath	882	2.14	+2.14
Family First	Alison White	877	2.12	+2.12
Freedom	Diane M. Teasdale	807	1.95	+1.95
Animal Justice	Katherine Taylor	515	1.25	+1.25
Total formal votes		41,301	93.94	−0.58
Informal votes		2,663	6.06	+0.58
Turnout		43,964	86.21	−3.37
Notional two-party-preferred count
National	Kim O'Keeffe	30,704	74.34	+74.34
Labor	Liam Cowan	10,597	25.66	−12.62
Two-candidate-preferred result
National	Kim O'Keeffe	23,455	56.79	+56.79
Independent	Suzanna Sheed	17,846	43.21	−12.09
National gain from Independent		Swing	N/A	

=== Elections in the 2010s ===
==== 2018 ====
2018 Victorian state election: Shepparton
Party	Candidate	Votes	%	±%
Independent	Suzanna Sheed	15,856	38.40	+5.68
Liberal	Cheryl Hammer	10,967	26.56	+26.56
National	Peter Schwarz	5,382	13.03	−22.32
Labor	Bill Heath	4,772	11.56	−6.32
Shooters, Fishers, Farmers	Murray Willaton	3,314	8.03	+8.03
Greens	Nickee Freeman	999	2.42	−0.96
Total formal votes		41,290	94.52	+0.36
Informal votes		2,396	5.48	−0.36
Turnout		43,686	89.58	−3.24
Two-party-preferred result
Liberal	Cheryl Hammer	25,484	61.72	−1.56
Labor	Bill Heath	15,806	38.28	+1.56
Two-candidate-preferred result
Independent	Suzanna Sheed	22,833	55.30	+2.67
Liberal	Cheryl Hammer	18,457	44.70	+44.70
Independent hold		Swing	N/A	

==== 2014 ====
2014 Victorian state election: Shepparton
Party	Candidate	Votes	%	±%
National	Greg Barr	14,272	35.4	−18.4
Independent	Suzanna Sheed	13,211	32.7	+32.7
Labor	Rodney Higgins	7,218	17.9	+1.7
Country Alliance	Michael Bourke	3,310	8.2	−11.5
Greens	Damien Stevens	1,365	3.4	−1.3
Independent	Diane Teasdale	994	2.5	+2.5
Total formal votes		40,370	94.2	−0.3
Informal votes		2,504	5.8	+0.3
Turnout		42,874	92.8	−1.1
Notional two-party-preferred count
National	Greg Barr	25,546	63.3	−12.6
Labor	Rodney Higgins	14,824	36.7	+12.6
Two-candidate-preferred result
Independent	Suzanna Sheed	21,247	52.6	+52.6
National	Greg Barr	19,123	47.4	−28.5
Independent gain from National		Swing	N/A	

==== 2010 ====
2010 Victorian state election: Shepparton
Party	Candidate	Votes	%	±%
National	Jeanette Powell	17,609	52.9	+4.5
Country Alliance	Dennis Patterson	6,826	20.5	+20.5
Labor	Anthony Fullarton	5,245	15.8	−3.2
Greens	Lachlan Slade	1,631	4.9	+0.2
Independent	Paul Wickham	958	2.9	+2.9
Family First	Malcolm Moore	769	2.3	+0.3
Independent	Shannon Smith	232	0.7	+0.7
Total formal votes		33,270	94.4	−0.6
Informal votes		1,955	5.6	+0.6
Turnout		35,225	92.4	−1.1
Notional two-party-preferred count
National	Jeanette Powell	25,376	76.0	+1.3
Labor	Anthony Fullarton	8,027	24.0	−1.3
Two-candidate-preferred result
National	Jeanette Powell	20,041	60.2	−14.4
Country Alliance	Dennis Patterson	13,329	39.8	+39.8
National hold		Swing	−14.4	

=== Elections in the 2000s ===
==== 2006 ====
2006 Victorian state election: Shepparton
Party	Candidate	Votes	%	±%
National	Jeanette Powell	15,743	48.4	+19.6
Liberal	Stephen Merrylees	8,427	25.9	−4.1
Labor	James Taylor	6,174	19.0	−2.9
Greens	Doug Ralph	1,519	4.7	+1.4
Family First	Neil Meyer	640	2.0	+2.0
Total formal votes		32,503	96.0	−0.4
Informal votes		1,346	4.0	+0.4
Turnout		33,849	93.5	
Notional two-party-preferred count
National	Jeanette Powell	24,264	74.7	+9.5
Labor	James Taylor	8,239	25.3	−9.5
Two-candidate-preferred result
National	Jeanette Powell	21,677	66.7	+12.4
Liberal	Stephen Merrylees	10,838	33.3	−12.4
National hold		Swing	+12.4	

==== 2002 ====
2002 Victorian state election: Shepparton
Party	Candidate	Votes	%	±%
Liberal	Stephen Merrylees	9,662	30.0	+30.0
National	Jeanette Powell	9,268	28.8	−11.7
Labor	Alan Calder	7,050	21.9	−2.7
Independent	Chris Hazelman	5,129	15.9	−18.9
Greens	John Griffiths	1,057	3.3	+3.3
Total formal votes		32,166	96.4	−0.9
Informal votes		1,202	3.6	+0.9
Turnout		33,368	93.3	
Notional two-party-preferred count
National	Jeanette Powell	20,933	65.1	+2.8
Labor	Alan Calder	11,209	34.9	−2.8
Two-candidate-preferred result
National	Jeanette Powell	17,458	54.3	−0.1
Liberal	Stephen Merrylees	14,708	45.7	+45.7
National hold		Swing	−0.1	

=== Elections in the 1990s ===
==== 1999 ====
1999 Victorian state election: Shepparton
Party	Candidate	Votes	%	±%
National	Don Kilgour	12,355	39.9	−26.0
Independent	Chris Hazelman	10,965	35.4	+35.4
Labor	Wendy Boyle	7,616	24.6	−3.2
Total formal votes		30,936	97.3	−0.3
Informal votes		865	2.7	+0.3
Turnout		31,801	94.0	
Two-party-preferred result
National	Don Kilgour	19,267	62.1	−7.4
Labor	Wendy Boyle	11,743	37.9	+7.4
Two-candidate-preferred result
National	Don Kilgour	16,724	54.1	−15.5
Independent	Chris Hazelman	14,212	45.9	+45.9
National hold		Swing	−15.5	

==== 1996 ====
1996 Victorian state election: Shepparton
Party	Candidate	Votes	%	±%
National	Don Kilgour	20,078	66.0	−3.5
Labor	John Sheen	8,466	27.8	−2.7
Independent	Bruce Little	1,886	6.2	+6.2
Total formal votes		30,430	97.6	+0.8
Informal votes		752	2.4	−0.8
Turnout		31,182	94.2	
Two-party-preferred result
National	Don Kilgour	21,161	69.6	+0.1
Labor	John Sheen	9,254	30.4	−0.1
National hold		Swing	+0.1	

==== 1992 ====
1992 Victorian state election: Shepparton
Party	Candidate	Votes	%	±%
National	Don Kilgour	20,385	69.5	+14.8
Labor	John Sheen	8,962	30.5	+3.9
Total formal votes		29,347	96.8	−0.8
Informal votes		974	3.2	+0.8
Turnout		30,321	95.8	
National hold		Swing	−2.0	

==== 1991 by-election ====
1991 Shepparton state by-election
Party	Candidate	Votes	%	±%
National	Don Kilgour	14,132	51.6	−3.1
Independent	Valerie McDougall	10,600	38.7	+38.7
Independent Labor	Frank Purcell	2,662	9.7	+9.7
Total formal votes		27,394	97.9	+0.3
Informal votes		598	2.1	−0.3
Turnout		27,992	87.1	−6.9
National hold		Swing	N/A	

=== Elections in the 1980s ===
==== 1988 ====
1988 Victorian state election: Shepparton
Party	Candidate	Votes	%	±%
National	Peter Ross-Edwards	15,570	54.68	−1.96
Labor	David Wauchope	7,581	26.62	+0.59
Liberal	John Menzies	5,323	18.69	+1.36
Total formal votes		28,474	97.56	−0.48
Informal votes		711	2.44	+0.48
Turnout		29,185	93.95	+0.15
Two-party-preferred result
National	Peter Ross-Edwards	20,353	71.50	−1.03
Labor	David Wauchope	8,112	28.50	+1.03
National hold		Swing	−1.03	

==== 1985 ====
1985 Victorian state election: Shepparton
Party	Candidate	Votes	%	±%
National	Peter Ross-Edwards	15,428	56.6	+9.0
Labor	David Wauchope	7,090	26.0	−4.0
Liberal	Alan Fitzgerald	4,721	17.3	−5.0
Total formal votes		27,239	98.0	
Informal votes		545	2.0	
Turnout		27,784	93.8	
Two-party-preferred result
National	Peter Ross-Edwards	19,830	72.8	+4.9
Labor	David Wauchope	7,409	27.2	−4.9
National hold		Swing	+4.9	

==== 1982 ====
1982 Victorian state election: Shepparton
Party	Candidate	Votes	%	±%
National	Peter Ross-Edwards	13,021	48.2	−1.8
Labor	Marjorie Gillies	7,994	29.6	+2.9
Liberal	Bill Hunter	5,979	22.2	−1.1
Total formal votes		26,994	97.7	+1.6
Informal votes		635	2.3	−1.6
Turnout		27,629	95.0	−0.6
Two-party-preferred result
National	Peter Ross-Edwards	18,429	68.3	−2.5
Labor	Marjorie Gillies	8,565	31.7	+2.5
National hold		Swing	−2.5	

=== Elections in the 1970s ===
==== 1979 ====
1979 Victorian state election: Shepparton
Party	Candidate	Votes	%	±%
National	Peter Ross-Edwards	12,362	50.0	−4.1
Labor	Marjorie Gillies	6,598	26.7	+7.3
Liberal	Haset Sali	5,756	23.3	+1.7
Total formal votes		24,716	96.1	−1.8
Informal votes		993	3.9	+1.8
Turnout		25,709	95.6	+0.3
Two-party-preferred result
National	Peter Ross-Edwards	17,502	70.8	−6.9
Labor	Marjorie Gillies	7,214	29.2	+6.9
National hold		Swing	−6.9	

==== 1976 ====
1976 Victorian state election: Shepparton
Party	Candidate	Votes	%	±%
National	Peter Ross-Edwards	12,753	54.1	+9.6
Liberal	Bill Hunter	5,099	21.6	−1.8
Labor	Stephen Fletcher	4,570	19.4	−3.8
Democratic Labor	Martha Bennetts	1,154	4.9	−4.0
Total formal votes		23,576	97.9	
Informal votes		497	2.1	
Turnout		24,073	95.3	
Two-party-preferred result
National	Peter Ross-Edwards	18,308	77.7	+5.6
Labor	Stephen Fletcher	5,268	22.3	−5.6
National hold		Swing	+5.6	

==== 1973 ====
1973 Victorian state election: Shepparton
Party	Candidate	Votes	%	±%
Country	Peter Ross-Edwards	9,468	44.5	+2.9
Liberal	Bill Hunter	4,975	23.4	+12.6
Labor	Patrick Golden	4,925	23.2	+5.1
Democratic Labor	Arthur Garner	1,896	8.9	−1.2
Total formal votes		21,264	97.0	+1.2
Informal votes		658	3.0	−1.2
Turnout		21,922	95.6	−0.6
Two-party-preferred result
Country	Peter Ross-Edwards	15,422	72.6	−0.4
Labor	Patrick Golden	5,842	27.4	+0.4
Country hold		Swing	−0.4	

==== 1970 ====
1970 Victorian state election: Shepparton
Party	Candidate	Votes	%	±%
Country	Peter Ross-Edwards	7,676	41.6	+5.6
Independent	Bill Hunter	3,586	19.4	+1.7
Labor	Graham Romanes	3,332	18.1	+0.4
Liberal	Linton Laws	1,995	10.8	−6.4
Democratic Labor	Bruno D'Elia	1,875	10.1	−1.3
Total formal votes		18,464	95.8	+1.1
Informal votes		810	4.2	−1.1
Turnout		19,274	96.2	+0.1
Two-party-preferred result
Country	Peter Ross-Edwards	13,479	73.0	−4.6
Labor	Graham Romanes	4,985	27.0	+4.6
Two-candidate-preferred result
Country	Peter Ross-Edwards	9,412	51.0	−1.0
Independent	Bill Hunter	9,052	49.0	+1.0
Country hold		Swing	−1.0	

=== Elections in the 1960s ===
==== 1967 ====
1967 Victorian state election: Shepparton
Party	Candidate	Votes	%	±%
Country	Peter Ross-Edwards	6,206	36.0	−19.2
Independent	Bill Hunter	3,042	17.7	+17.7
Labor	Neil Frankland	3,042	17.7	+17.7
Liberal	Thomas Gribben	2,969	17.2	−9.7
Democratic Labor	Bruce Morison	1,974	11.4	−6.5
Total formal votes		17,233	94.7	
Informal votes		958	5.3	
Turnout		18,191	96.1	
Two-party-preferred result
Country	Peter Ross-Edwards	13,374	77.6	
Labor	Neil Frankland	3,859	22.4	
Two-candidate-preferred result
Country	Peter Ross-Edwards	8,952	51.9	−6.9
Independent	Bill Hunter	8,281	48.1	+48.1
Country hold		Swing	−6.9	

=== Elections in the 1950s ===
==== 1952 ====
1952 Victorian state election: Shepparton
Party	Candidate	Votes	%	±%
Country	John McDonald	7,367	46.4	+4.7
Labor	Gordon Anderson	6,231	39.2	+4.9
Liberal and Country	Ian McIntosh	2,293	14.4	−9.7
Total formal votes		15,891	98.6	−0.5
Informal votes		217	1.4	+0.5
Turnout		16,108	95.0	+0.1
Two-party-preferred result
Country	John McDonald	9,124	57.4	−4.1
Labor	Gordon Anderson	6,767	42.6	+4.1
Country hold		Swing	−4.1	

==== 1950 ====
1950 Victorian state election: Shepparton
Party	Candidate	Votes	%	±%
Country	John McDonald	6,395	41.6	−26.9
Labor	Gordon Anderson	5,263	34.3	+2.8
Liberal and Country	Harold Causer	3,698	24.1	+24.1
Total formal votes		15,356	99.1	+0.1
Informal votes		133	0.9	−0.1
Turnout		15,489	94.9	+0.8
Two-party-preferred result
Country	John McDonald	9,439	61.5	−7.0
Labor	Gordon Anderson	5,917	39.5	+7.0
Country hold		Swing	−7.0	

=== Elections in the 1940s ===
==== 1947 ====
1947 Victorian state election: Shepparton
Party	Candidate	Votes	%	±%
Country	John McDonald	9,861	68.5	+5.5
Labor	Edward Newman	4,525	31.5	−5.5
Total formal votes		14,386	99.0	−0.3
Informal votes		143	1.0	+0.3
Turnout		14,529	94.1	+6.2
Country hold		Swing	+5.5	

==== 1945 ====
1945 Victorian state election: Shepparton
Party	Candidate	Votes	%	±%
Country	John McDonald	8,116	63.0	
Labor	Frederick Hargreaves	4,775	37.0	
Total formal votes		12,891	99.3	
Informal votes		91	0.7	
Turnout		12,982	87.9	
Country hold		Swing		
