= Rolland Fairley =

Australian rules footballer

Personal information
- Full name: Rolland Fairley
- Born: 7 December 1904; Shepparton, Victoria
- Died: 10 June 1930 (aged 25); Wallan, Victoria
- Original team: South Melbourne Districts
- Height: 179 cm (5 ft 10 in)
- Weight: 80 kg (176 lb)
- Position: Follower

Playing career^{1}
Years	Club	Games (Goals)
1927–1928	South Melbourne	10 (3)
1928	Hawthorn	12 (1)
Total		22 (4)
- ^{1} Playing statistics correct to the end of 1928.

Rolland Fairley (7 December 1904 – 10 June 1930) was an Australian rules footballer who played with South Melbourne and Hawthorn in the Victorian Football League (VFL).

Born in Shepparton to John Frederick Fairley and Helen Georgina McCracken, Rolland Fairley was educated at Shepparton High School.

Arriving from South Melbourne Districts, Fairley played eight games for South Melbourne in the 1927 VFL season. He appeared two more times for the club in 1928 but finished the season at Hawthorn, playing 12 games. All his appearances with Hawthorn were losses.

He returned to country football with Shepparton in 1929.

Fairley was killed in a road incident at Wallan in 1930, en route to Shepparton. He had been changing a tyre on the side of the road when he was struck by the driver of another vehicle.
