= 1991 Shepparton state by-election =

- 19 October 1991

Electoral district of Shepparton in the Victorian Legislative Assembly
- Registered: 32,125
- Turnout: 87.1% (▼6.9)
| | First party | Second party | Third party |
|---|---|---|---|
| | | IND | IND |
| Candidate | Don Kilgour | Valerie McDougall | Frank Purcell |
| Party | National | Independent | Ind. Labor |
| First preference vote | 14,132 | 10,600 | 2,662 |
| Percentage | 51.6% | 38.7% | 9.7% |
| Swing | ▼3.1 | ▲38.7 | ▲9.7 |
MP before election
John Ellis
National
Elected MP
Don Kilgour
National

The 1991 Shepparton state by-election was held on 19 October 1991 to elect the member for Shepparton in the Victorian Legislative Assembly, following the resignation of Nationals MP Peter Ross-Edwards.

Ross-Edwards had represented Shepparton since the seat was re-established in 1967, and served as the leader of the Victorian National Party (previously known as the Country Party) from 1970 until 1988.

Don Kilgour retained the seat for the Nationals, winning 51.6% of first preference votes. The Labor Party and the Liberal Party, which received 26.6% and 18.7% of the vote respectively at the 1988 state election, did not contest the by-election.

== Candidates ==
Candidates are listed in the order they appeared on the ballot.

| Party | Candidate | Background |
|---|---|---|
| National | Don Kilgour | Radio announcer, sports commentator and businessman |
| Independent Labor | Frank Purcell | Member of the Shepparton branch of the Labor Party |
| Independent | Valerie McDougall | Former finance journalist at The Age |

== Results ==
1991 Shepparton state by-election
| Party | Candidate | Votes | % | ±% |
|---|---|---|---|---|
| National | Don Kilgour | 14,132 | 51.6 | −3.1 |
| Independent | Valerie McDougall | 10,600 | 38.7 | +38.7 |
| Independent Labor | Frank Purcell | 2,662 | 9.7 | +9.7 |
| Total formal votes | | 27,394 | 97.9 | +0.3 |
| Informal votes | | 598 | 2.1 | −0.3 |
| Turnout | | 27,992 | 87.1 | −6.9 |
| National hold | | Swing | N/A | |

== See also ==
- Electoral results for the district of Shepparton
- List of Victorian state by-elections
