= McGuire College =

Location
- 92-100 Wilmot Road; Shepparton, Victoria, 3630; Australia

Information
- Type: Secondary school
- Motto: Caring Learning Community
- Opened: 1966; 53 years ago
- Principal: John Sciacca
- Years offered: 7–12
- Enrolment: ~600
- Colour: Navy blue white maroon
- Nickname: McGuire
- Website: www.mcguireco.vic.edu.au

McGuire College is a coeducational secondary school located in Shepparton, Victoria, Australia on Wilmot Road, neighbouring with Wilmot Road Primary. The school was previously known as Shepparton South Technical School. It has approximately 501–600 students (2019).

In 2020 the school will close and then merge with the City of Greater Shepparton's other government secondary schools, Shepparton High School, Wanganui Park Secondary College and Mooroopna Secondary College. John Sciacca was appointed Principal in June 2019.

== Culture ==
Throughout Shepparton, McGuire College is recognised as a culturally diverse school. Majority of the student population have parents who immigrated to Australia and a lot of those students also immigrated themselves. The student culture includes Arabic, Afghani, Indigenous Australians, Sudanese, Congolese, South African, Kenyan, Samoan, Tongan, Thai, Fijian, Italian, Chinese, Korean, Japanese and Kiwi. The languages of these cultures are spoken daily by the students with Arabic being the second most spoken language in the school. Persian is not far behind. The school annually celebrates Harmony Day.

== Sport ==
McGuire College has a soccer team.

== Houses ==
McGuire College has four house groups for school sport events; Teal (blue), Crane (yellow), Heron (red) and Swan (green). These houses compete in an Athletics Carnival, Cross Country Running and Swimming.

== History ==
The school was first opened in February 1966 as Shepparton South Technical School and was first located at the Shepparton Showgrounds but it grew so quickly that it had to move to the current site of McGuire College on Wilmot Road in 1968. In 1990 it was renamed as Shepparton South Secondary College and then in 1998 it was officially named McGuire College.
