= Electoral results for the Division of Nicholls =

Australian division election results

This is a list of electoral results for the Division of Nicholls in Australian federal elections from the division's creation in 2019 until the present.

== Members ==
Member	Party	Term
Damian Drum	National	2019–2022
Sam Birrell	National	2022–present

== Election results ==
=== Elections in the 2020s ===
==== 2025 ====
2025 Australian federal election: Nicholls
Party	Candidate	Votes	%	±%
Labor	Kim Travers			
Family First	Paul Edward Bachelor			
Trumpet of Patriots	Glenn Francis Floyd			
One Nation	Aaron Tyrrell			
National	Sam Birrell			
Citizens	Jeff Davy			
Greens	Shelby Eade			
Total formal votes				
Informal votes				
Turnout				

==== 2022 ====
2022 Australian federal election: Nicholls
Party	Candidate	Votes	%	±%
National	Sam Birrell	24,886	26.14	−25.13
Independent	Rob Priestly	24,287	25.51	+25.51
Liberal	Steve Brooks	17,187	18.06	+18.06
Labor	Bill Lodwick	10,970	11.52	−7.89
One Nation	Rikkie-Lee Tyrrell	6,219	6.53	−4.76
United Australia	Robert Peterson	3,821	4.01	−1.32
Liberal Democrats	Tim Laird	3,366	3.54	+3.54
Greens	Ian Christoe	3,058	3.21	−1.00
Fusion	Andrea Otto	653	0.69	+0.69
Citizens	Jeff Davy	377	0.40	+0.40
Federation	Eleonor Tabone	367	0.39	+0.39
Total formal votes		95,191	92.11	−0.43
Informal votes		8,159	7.89	+0.43
Turnout		103,350	90.35	−2.98
Notional two-party-preferred count
National	Sam Birrell	63,918	67.15	−2.88
Labor	Bill Lodwick	31,273	32.85	+2.88
Two-candidate-preferred result
National	Sam Birrell	51,221	53.81	−16.22
Independent	Rob Priestly	43,970	46.19	+46.19
National hold				

Alluvial diagram for preference flows in the seat of Nicholls in the 2022 federal election. indicates at what stage the winning candidate had over 50% of the votes and was declared the winner.

=== Elections in the 2010s ===
==== 2019 ====
2019 Australian federal election: Nicholls
Party	Candidate	Votes	%	±%
National	Damian Drum	48,855	51.27	+18.58
Labor	Bill Lodwick	18,493	19.41	+2.32
One Nation	Rikkie-Lee Tyrrell	10,754	11.29	+11.29
United Australia	Stewart Hine	5,077	5.33	+5.33
Independent	Andrew Bock	4,581	4.81	+3.39
Greens	Nickee Freeman	4,011	4.21	−0.23
Independent	Jeremy Parker	1,772	1.86	+1.86
Independent	Nigel Hicks	1,749	1.84	+1.00
Total formal votes		95,292	92.54	+1.16
Informal votes		7,679	7.46	−1.16
Turnout		102,971	92.65	−0.80
Two-party-preferred result
National	Damian Drum	66,732	70.03	−2.49
Labor	Bill Lodwick	28,560	29.97	+2.49
National notional hold		Swing	−2.49	

Nicholls was a new seat, notionally held by the Nationals.
