= Greater Shepparton Secondary College =

Location
- 31–71 Hawdon Street; Shepparton, Victoria, 3630; Australia
- Coordinates: 36°22′19″S 145°24′55.5″E

Information
- Type: Public high school
- Opened: 31 January 2020
- Principal: Barbara O'Brien
- Years offered: 7–12
- Colours: Teal, charcoal, white and orange
- Website: https://www.gssc.vic.edu.au/

Greater Shepparton Secondary College (GSSC) is a public secondary college in Shepparton, Victoria, Australia. It opened in 2020 as an amalgamation of four of the region's previous high schools. The school's main campus is located on the former site of Shepparton High School, and was opened in 2022.

== History ==
The GSSC was created from the Shepparton Education plan. This was a result of lower educational outcomes from students in the Shepparton region when compared to similar schools across Victoria. The school officially opened in 2020 by taking over the four public high schools located in Shepparton and nearby Mooroopna. The four schools amalgamated were Shepparton High School, McGuire College, Wanganui Park Secondary College and Mooroopna Secondary College.

During the construction of the main GSSC campus, students attended their classes at the sites of the previous high schools, depending upon their year level and classes. Other campuses used by GSSC include a small campus located in Invergordon. After the scheduled opening of the main campus in 2022, it is expected that the additional campuses will be closed permanently.

== Public Profile & Criticism ==
Since the school’s opening, Greater Shepparton Secondary College has attracted public attention and criticism. An independent review commissioned by the Victorian Department of Education reported multiple incidents involving racism and described a culture of under-reporting at the school.

Media reports have also described concerns from parents and teachers regarding limited alternative government secondary school options in the Greater Shepparton area.
