= Shepparton =

- City
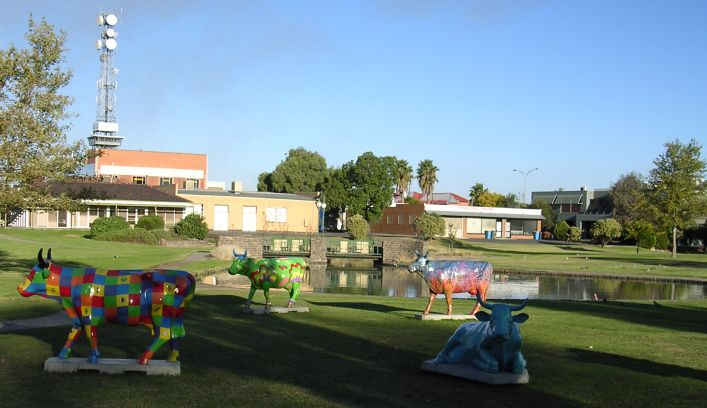
- Shepparton CBD, communications tower and "Mooving Art" display from Monash Park

- Interactive map of Shepparton
- Coordinates: 36°23′S 145°24′E
- Country: Australia
- State: Victoria
- Region: Hume
- LGA: City of Greater Shepparton
- Location: 181 km (112 mi) NNE of Melbourne; 120 km (75 mi) NE of Bendigo; 176 km (109 mi) SW of Albury; 61 km (38 mi) W of Benalla; 4 km (2.5 mi) E of Mooroopna
- Established: 24 September 1860

Government
  - State electorate: Shepparton
  - Federal division: Nicholls

Area
  - Total: 42.8 km^{2} (16.5 sq mi)
- Elevation: 115 m (377 ft)

Population
  - Total: 32,067 (2021 census)
  - Density: 749.2/km^{2} (1,940.5/sq mi)
- Time zone: UTC+10 (AEST)
  - Summer (DST): UTC+11 (AEDT)
- Postcode: 3630
- County: Moira
- Gazetted: 28 September 1860
- Mean max temp: 22.4 °C (72.3 °F)
- Mean min temp: 8.7 °C (47.7 °F)
- Annual rainfall: 436.7 mm (17.19 in)
Localities around Shepparton
Mooroopna North	Shepparton North	Grahamvale
Mooroopna	Shepparton	Shepparton East
Kialla	Kialla	Orrvale

Shepparton (/ˈʃɛpərtən/ SHEP-ər-tən; Yorta Yorta: Kanny-goopna) is a regional city located on the floodplain of the Goulburn River in northern Victoria, Australia, approximately 181 kilometres (112 mi) north-northeast of Melbourne. As of the 2021 census, the locality of Shepparton had a population of 32,067. The broader urban area, including the adjacent town of Mooroopna, had a combined population of 53,841.

It began as a sheep station and river crossing in the mid-19th century, before undergoing a major transformation as a railway town. Today it is an agricultural and manufacturing centre, and the centre of the Goulburn Valley irrigation system, one of the largest centres of irrigation in Australia. It is also a major regional service city and the seat of local government and civic administration for the City of Greater Shepparton, which includes the surrounding towns of Tatura, Merrigum, Mooroopna, Murchison, Dookie, Toolamba and Grahamvale.

== Toponymy ==
The name of Shepparton is derived from the surname of one of the area's first European settlers, Sherbourne Sheppard, and not, as is sometimes imagined, from Shepperton, England.

The Yorta Yorta name for the area is 'Kanny-goopna' with 'goopna' meaning 'deep waterholes by which people camped'. Conversely, the name for the big waterhole at the Broken River at Benalla is 'Marangan', meaning deep pond or lagoon in Taungurung Eastern Kulin language.

Colloquially (and not inconsistent with the Australian propensity for name-shortening or diminutives), the city is also known as "Shepp" (/ˈʃɛp/), as adopted by community entities that incorporate the abbreviated form into their name, e.g., the Shepparton Agricultural Society, or "Sheppshow".

== History ==
Prior to the European settlement of Australia, the area was inhabited by the Yorta Yorta, the indigenous Australian people whose country covers the junction of the Goulburn and Murray Rivers in present-day northern Victoria and southern New South Wales. The town of Shepparton and surrounds are on the country of the Kailtheban clan of the Yorta Yorta nation.

Surveyor General Thomas Mitchell was the first European to be recorded traveling through the area, crossing the Goulburn River in 1836 on his return to Sydney from an expedition to survey the Darling River and its tributaries. On Mitchell's recommendation, Joseph Hawdon and Charles Bonney would follow two years later, camping on the town site by the Goulburn River in 1838 while droving cattle from Albury to Adelaide.

The first permanent settlement in the area was the "Tallygaroopna" sheep station, established in the early 1840s. By 1843 the station was being run by a man named Sherbourne Sheppard, the town's eventual namesake. With the advent of the Victorian gold rush in the 1850s, the area became a popular river crossing point for miners travelling east from the Bendigo and Ballarat goldfields. As there was no bridge across the Goulburn River, Irish entrepreneur Patrick Macguire set up a punt service to ferry travellers across the river, erecting the town's first building in the process, the punt house. Macguire sold the building to John Hill in 1853, who converted it into a hotel, the Emu Bush Inn. This settlement soon became known as Macguire's Punt, a name it would keep into the 1870s. A post office opened in February 1854, but closed in July that same year.

The settlement was first surveyed in 1855 by Assistant Surveyor J.G.W. Wilmot. By this time, in addition to Macguire's Punt, it had also become known as Sheppard town, Sheppardton, and Shepparton. The post office reopened in May 1858, and two years later the Governor of Victoria officially declared Shepparton a township on 24 September 1860. It remained a small settlement of a half-dozen buildings into the 1870s despite adding a police station, a general store, a blacksmith, a foundry, and a public hall which remains the city's oldest building. Shepparton's first bridge over the Goulburn River was completed in 1878 and named Dainton's Bridge after James Henry Dainton, the bridge's chief engineer. The first church, St. Patrick's, opened in 1879.

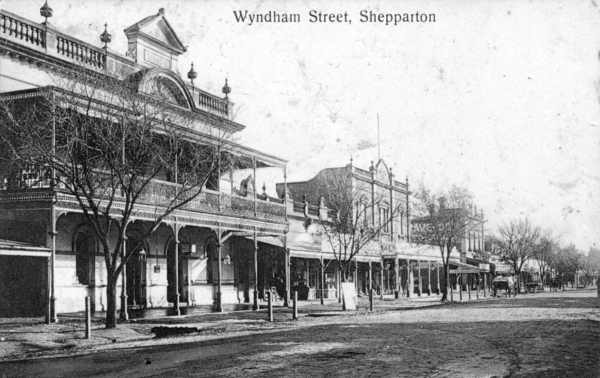
Wyndham Street, Shepparton in 1908

The railway from Seymour reached the town in 1880. A mechanics institute opened between 1880 and 1888 as Shepparton rapidly developed into a major manufacturing and service centre.

During the Victorian railway boom the railways expanded, and by the turn of the century Shepparton was central to a large network of regional branch lines on the Toolamba–Echuca railway line — lines leading to Cobram, Nathalia, Dookie, Picola and Katamatite. Rail-served industries helped Shepparton grow into a city. While these lines experienced a brief boom, almost all of them would later close. The Goulburn River also developed as a secondary transport hub, with paddle steamers and ferries operating at The Barges.

In the post-war era the city's population virtually tripled, with immigration to the city becoming a major factor, particularly of Mediterranean origin including new residents from Italy, Greece, Albania, Yugoslavia and Macedonia. Post war the city's built environment also went through rapid change, with many of the old buildings being replaced with modern ones. One of the last significant pre-war buildings, the post office was modernised during this period before being demolished for the construction of a concrete building in 1973. Prior to its demolition the much loved landmark was originally planned to be rebuilt in another location as part of the development of an International Village however the proposal fell through. Since the 2000s there was renewed interest in rebuilding the lost landmark as a Local Heritage Museum.

== Geography ==
=== Climate ===
Shepparton has a cool semi-arid climate (Köppen: BSk) bordering upon a humid subtropical climate (Cfa), with hot, sunny summers and cool, cloudy winters. The hottest summer month is January, when the average maximum temperature is 32.1 °C (89.8 °F). In winter, the weather becomes coldest in July when the minimum averages 3.4 °C (38.1 °F) and the maximum gets to 13.3 °C (55.9 °F). On 7 February 2009, a maximum of 46.1 °C (115.0 °F) was recorded in the city.

Although the rainfall in Shepparton is fairly sparse, winter sees the most rain days. Rainfall is quite low throughout the year. Even with the wettest month being in November, the rainfall still averages at 45.7 millimetres (1.80 in). The driest month in terms of rainfall is January, which receives an average of 30.0 millimetres (1.18 in).

The average wind speed in Shepparton is 4.03 metres per second (14.5 km/h; 9.0 mph; 7.83 kn).

Climate data for Shepparton Airport (YSHT) (1996–2022); 114 metres or 374 feet AMSL; 36.43° S, 145.39° E
Month	Jan	Feb	Mar	Apr	May	Jun	Jul	Aug	Sep	Oct	Nov	Dec	Year
Record high °C (°F)	46.2 (115.2)	46.1 (115.0)	40.3 (104.5)	35.1 (95.2)	26.7 (80.1)	21.5 (70.7)	20.6 (69.1)	24.8 (76.6)	34.1 (93.4)	36.8 (98.2)	42.9 (109.2)	44.9 (112.8)	46.2 (115.2)
Mean daily maximum °C (°F)	32.1 (89.8)	31.0 (87.8)	27.5 (81.5)	22.6 (72.7)	17.6 (63.7)	14.2 (57.6)	13.3 (55.9)	14.9 (58.8)	18.2 (64.8)	22.3 (72.1)	26.3 (79.3)	29.2 (84.6)	22.4 (72.3)
Mean daily minimum °C (°F)	15.5 (59.9)	15.1 (59.2)	12.5 (54.5)	8.6 (47.5)	5.6 (42.1)	3.7 (38.7)	3.4 (38.1)	3.7 (38.7)	5.4 (41.7)	7.5 (45.5)	10.8 (51.4)	13.0 (55.4)	8.7 (47.7)
Record low °C (°F)	5.6 (42.1)	5.0 (41.0)	3.4 (38.1)	−0.6 (30.9)	−3.1 (26.4)	−5.9 (21.4)	−4.7 (23.5)	−6.3 (20.7)	−2.2 (28.0)	−0.4 (31.3)	0.3 (32.5)	4.0 (39.2)	−6.3 (20.7)
Average rainfall mm (inches)	30.0 (1.18)	34.0 (1.34)	32.5 (1.28)	35.4 (1.39)	34.3 (1.35)	38.8 (1.53)	42.0 (1.65)	44.8 (1.76)	36.4 (1.43)	30.9 (1.22)	45.7 (1.80)	31.9 (1.26)	436.7 (17.19)
Average rainy days (≥ 0.2 mm)	5.2	4.5	5.3	5.5	9.8	12.2	14.7	12.7	9.8	8.3	6.9	5.8	100.7
Average afternoon relative humidity (%)	28	33	35	43	56	66	68	61	53	44	38	31	46
Source: Bureau of Meteorology.

== Urban structure ==
=== Central business district ===
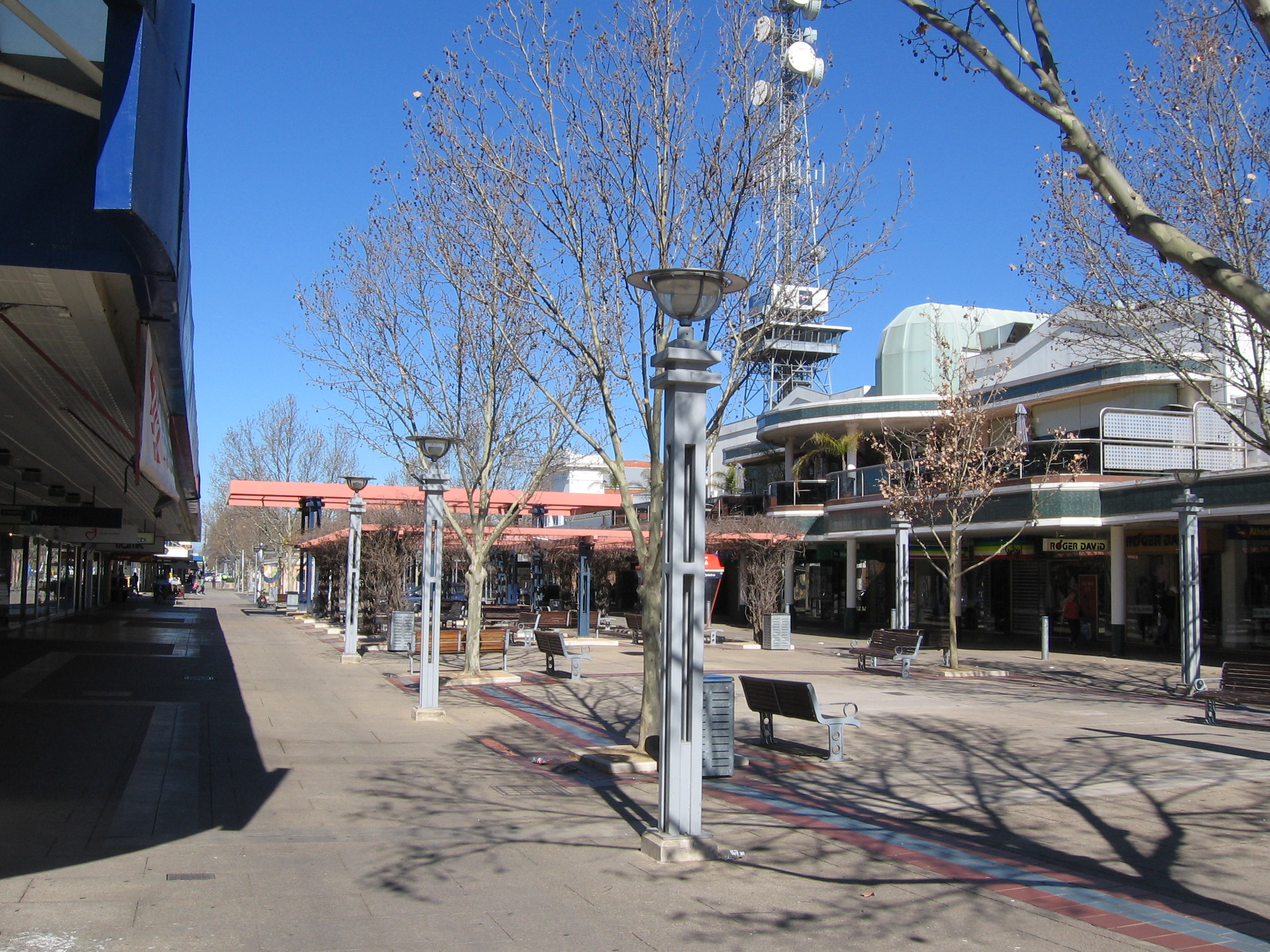
The Maude Street Mall

The Maude Street Mall is the city's main shopping centre, while Wyndham Street is the main civic and commercial street. Located off the Maude Street Mall is a 76-metre (249 ft) tall communications tower, erected 1967–68, with an observation deck at 35 m (115 ft) accessible via a 160-step stairway. The observation deck offers views over the city and surrounding countryside.

=== Suburbs ===
Shepparton has three nearby towns which could be considered suburbs. They are Mooroopna to the west, Kialla (and Kialla Lakes house and land subdivision) to the south, and Shepparton East to the east. Nearby, in the northeast, also lies the locality of Grahamvale.

== Economy ==
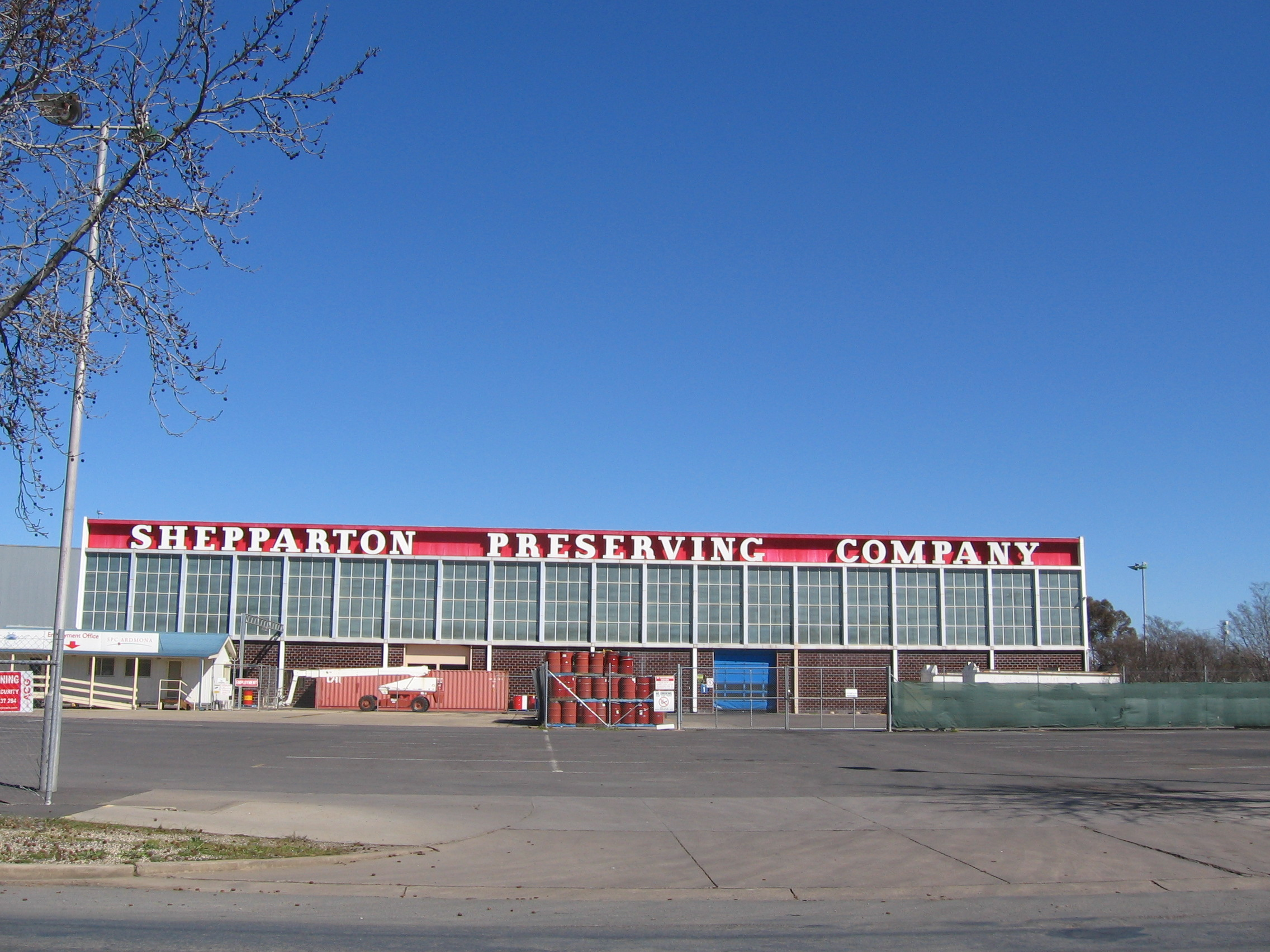
SPC Australia factory

Shepparton's main industries are agriculture and associated manufacturing. Australia's largest processor of canned fruits, SPC Australia, has a production facility in Shepparton. Seasonal fruits, such as peaches, pears and apricots are preserved into a variety of packaging.

The manufacturing industry has evolved to cater for the needs of local primary producers.

Other major manufacturers in the city include Campbells Soup Company, Rubicon Water, Pental, Civilmart and Visy.

Shepparton is a major regional commercial and shopping centre and service economy for the Greater Shepparton area. Major retailers in Shepparton include Target, Kmart, Harris Scarfe (formerly Fairleys Department Store), Bunnings, Rebel, The Reject Shop, Repco, Supercheap Auto, Autobarn and Dimmeys.

Shepparton is a major centre for infrastructure and civic services. The majority of the region's emergency response facilities are located there. The administrative headquarters for Country Fire Authority (CFA) District 22 and one of only two Independent Rescue Agencies in Victoria are located in Shepparton. The Search and Rescue Squad originally started out as a "Dive and Recovery Unit" recovering lost property and persons from the rivers, lakes and water ways in the region.

== Arts and culture ==
The city hosts the Moooving Art project, which involves local artists painting fibreglass cows, which are then displayed in tourist locations throughout the city and surrounding townships. The project is an artistic representation of the strong dairy industry prevalent in the Shepparton area.

Kidstown is located between Shepparton and Mooroopna; it has two giant slides, a 35-metre (115 ft) flying fox and a train that goes right around the playground.

The city is home to a large swimming centre called Aquamoves, two performing arts centres, one in Mooroopna named WestSide, due to its geographical location and the other the Eastbank Centre located in Shepparton (which houses the centres' box office). Collectively the centres are called Riverlinks Venues.

Shepparton is also home of the Shepparton Art Museum, more commonly known as SAM. SAM houses the world's most significant collection of Australian ceramics, and is home to the biennial Sidney Myer Fund Australian Ceramic Award and the Indigenous Ceramic Art Award. The museum features the surrealist sculpture Woman and Child by artist Sam Jinks.

Since 1997 Shepparton Festival - a combined professional and community arts festival - has presented live music, performing arts, and visual arts to Greater Shepparton. The festival is one of the most significant festivals in the region. It hosts art works by established artistic companies as well as independent acts, offers a wide variety of free family-friendly events, and presents work in both traditional arts venues and unconventional settings. In July 2022 the festival announced artist Kristen Retallick as the new Festival Director.

Shepparton is also home to the Shepparton Theatre Arts Group (STAG), the city's premier theatrical group. STAG was formed in 1975 after an amalgamation between the Shepparton Dramatic Society and the Shepparton Light Music Company. The group presents one dramatic/comedic play, one musical and one rock revue each year. The Goulburn Valley Concert Orchestra, a community symphony orchestra, gives an annual major concert and a series of cafe concerts every year.

== Sport ==
Deakin Reserve is the main sports venue in the Goulburn Valley and is a cricket and Australian Rules Football sports oval in Shepparton, Victoria, Australia.

Deakin Reserve hosted the long running Shepparton Sports Carnival between 1906 and 1967, which featured – athletics, cycling, wood chopping, fireworks, bands and dancing.

This sports venue was originally known as the cricket reserve in its very early years, then later known as the Shepparton Recreation Reserve, prior to being officially named the Deakin Reserve in 1947, in honour of former Victorian Water Supply Minister, former Federal politician and Australian Prime Minister, Alfred Deakin who was largely responsible for implementing the Goulburn Valley Irrigation Scheme.

Shepparton is home to the John McEwen Reserve, a sports field which is part of the Greater Shepparton Regional Sports Precinct. The complex contains space for a variety of sports including soccer, Australian Rules, netball and others. It was redeveloped by the state and federal governments and opened in 2017. It is named after John McEwen, the Prime Minister of Australia from 19 December 1967 to 10 January 1968. The ground has a capacity of 3,200 and is the home ground for a number of teams including the Goulburn Valley Suns, and has hosted a number of matches in the A and W soccer leagues.

Australian Rules Football is popular in Shepparton, which fields five clubs. The main league, called the Goulburn Valley Football League (GVFL), includes 3 teams from the city; Shepparton, Shepparton Swans and Shepparton United. There are also other smaller leagues, such as the Murray Football League, Kyabram & District Football League and the which have teams from in and around Greater Shepparton (Rumbalara and Shepparton East respectively). There is also a junior league in the schools (SDJFA). The city plays a major role in a team where the Australian Football League (AFL) frequently scouts for new talents to AFL clubs, which is the Murray Bushrangers.

Soccer is also popular in Shepparton with four senior clubs entering teams into competitions run by the Bendigo amateur soccer league; Shepparton (formerly Lemnos), Shepparton South and Shepparton United Teams are entered in men's, women's, boys' and girls' divisions. Shepparton is also home to the Goulburn Valley Suns Football Club. The soccer club was established in 2013, and currently competes in the National Premier Leagues.

Basketball is another popular sport in Shepparton. The Shepparton Lady Gators represent the Shepparton and Mooroopna region in women's basketball playing in the Big V division two competition. The men's team has beenone of the most successful country-based basketball teams in Australia, winning the CVIBL title in 1994 and the 2000, 2001 and 2003 Big V Championship ABA titles. As of 2025, the men's team compete in the Country basketball league.

Shepparton has a rugby union club known as the Bulls who compete in the Rugby Victoria Premiership.

Cycling is popular in Shepparton due to the flat terrain and extensive network of routes. The Goulburn Valley Hospice runs the annual Shepparton Fruit Loop Ride for cyclists. There is a velodrome facility located in the city's north and a world class BMX track as well as an extensive range of bike paths throughout the city and surrounding areas.

Shepparton Harness Racing Club conducts regular meetings at its racetrack in the city. The Shepparton Greyhound Racing Club holds regular greyhound racing meetings at its track on the Goulburn Valley Highway, Kialla, which opened on 10 December 2005. Previously the racing had been held at the Shepparton Showgrounds from 1973 until 2005.

The Shepparton Eagles compete in the Murray Cup amid a growing interest in rugby league.

Shepparton is also home to the Goulburn Valley Hockey Association. Hockey, whilst not having as great a following in previous years, still has a strong competition. The Shepparton field was resurfaced in 2015 with works to commence on a second field in the near future. The Goulburn Valley Hockey Association fields men's, women's and junior teams from the Shepparton Strikers, Shepparton Youth Club, Mooroopna, Benalla, Echuca and Euroa. The Hockey Association also features in State Hockey Championships for men and women at both Senior and Masters competitions and also provide teams for the Junior Country Championships.

Golfers play at the course of the Shepparton Golf Club on Golf Drive.

== Military ==
The Royal Australian Navy has named two warships HMAS Shepparton after the city, and the 8th/7th Battalion of the Royal Victoria Regiment has a light infantry company based at Somme Barracks south of the city centre.

== Demographics ==
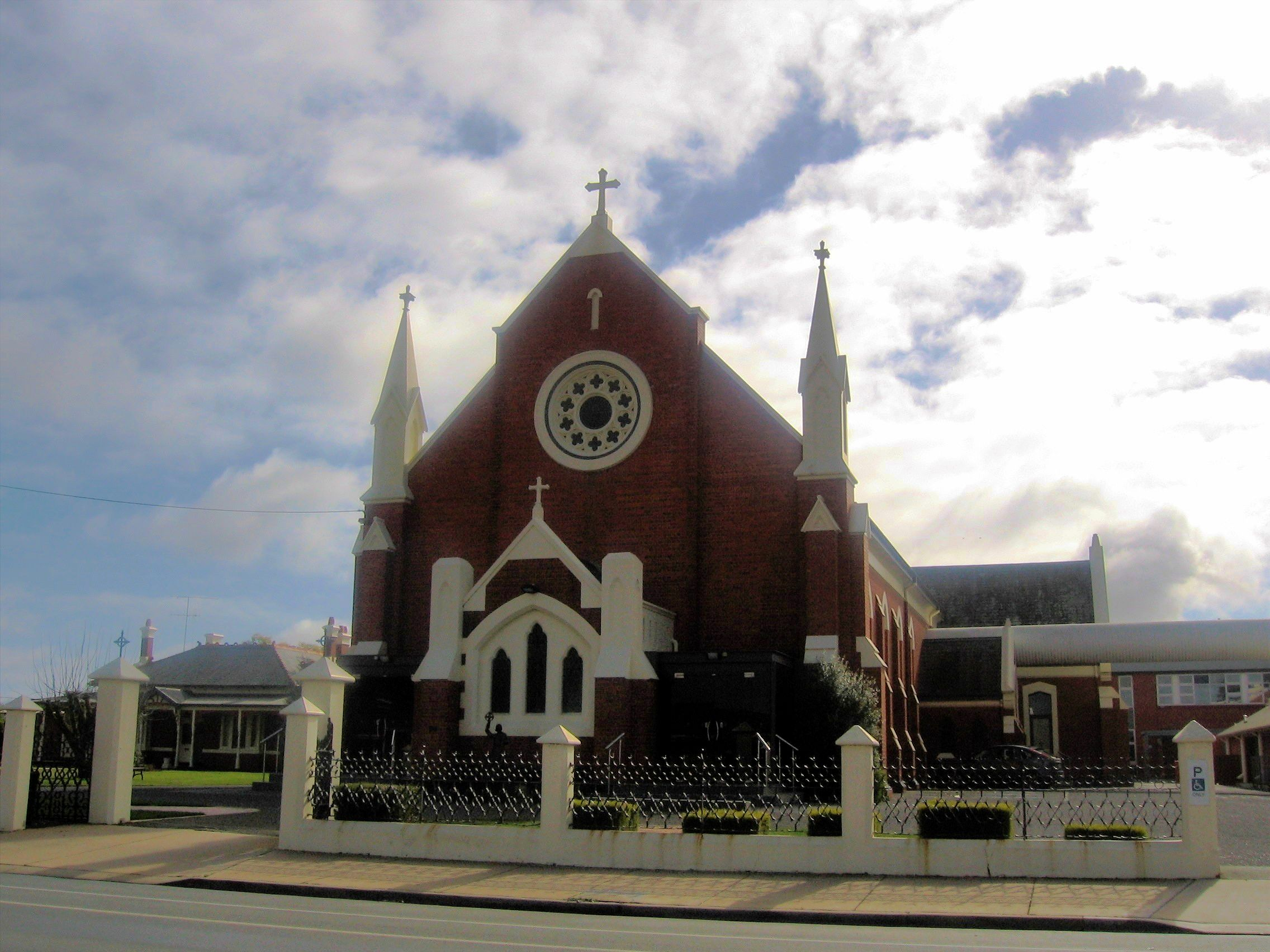
St. Brendan's Catholic Church

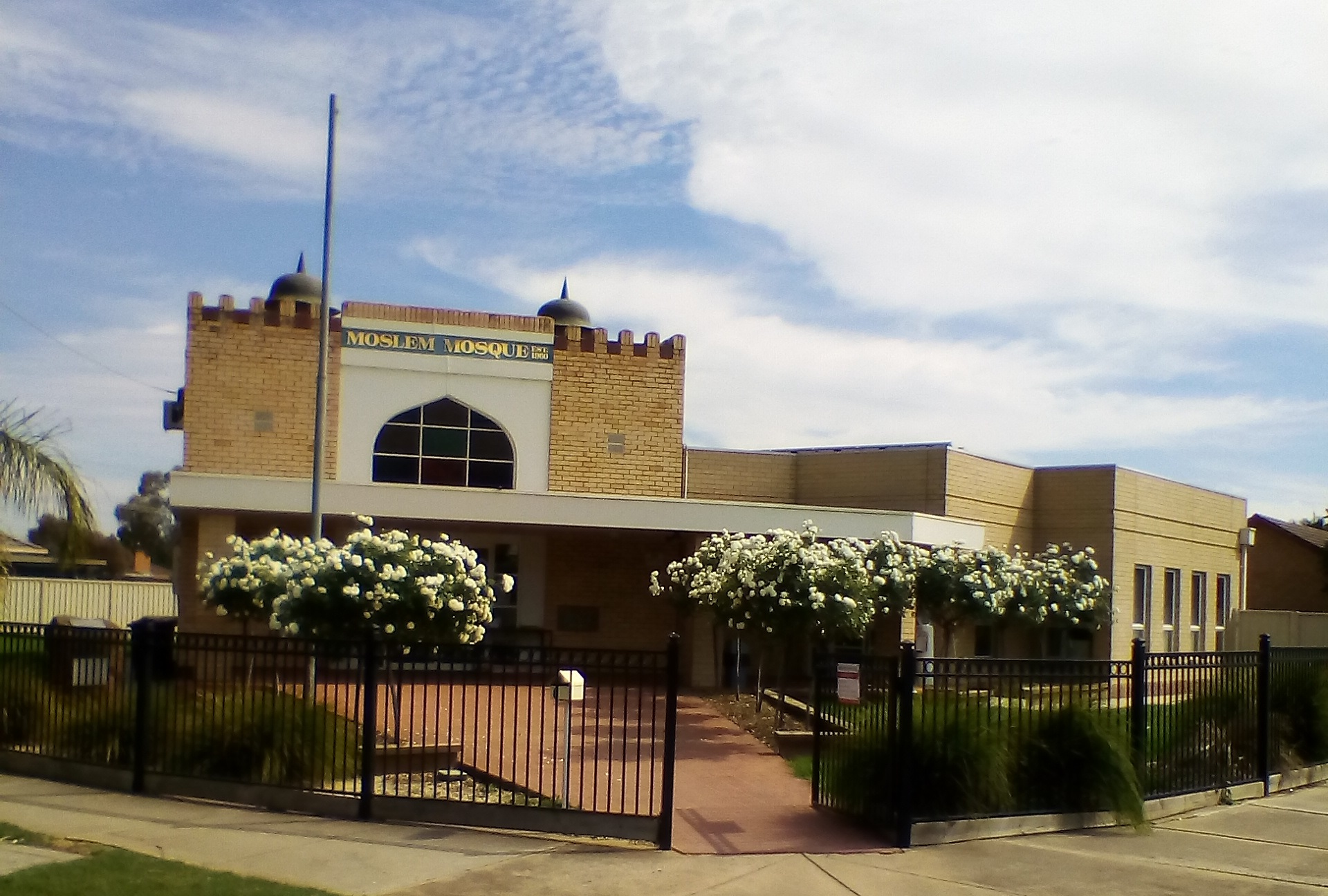
Shepparton Albanian Mosque

In the 2021 Census, there were 53,841 people in Shepparton - Mooroopna. Aboriginal and/or Torres Strait Islander people made up 4.3% of the population. 73.1% of people were born in Australia. The next most common countries of birth were India 3.5%, Afghanistan 1.4%, England 1.3%, Malaysia 1.2% and the Philippines 1.1%. 72.1% of people only spoke English at home. Other languages spoken at home included Punjabi 2.7%, Arabic 2.6%, Hazaraghi 1.5%, Italian 1.5% and Mandarin 1.1%.

=== Religion ===
The most common responses for religion were No Religion 33.4%, Catholic 22.3% and Anglican 8.3%. Christianity was the largest religious group reported overall (48.5%) (this figure excludes not stated responses).

The neighbouring town of Orrvale contained a small Jewish community from 1913, which disbanded in 1966. In 2015, the City of Shepparton commemorated the site of the Jewish community's synagogue with a monument.

Shepparton is home to a multicultural Muslim community numbering some 3,500 (5.5%). There are 4 mosques in the city (Shia: Afghan, Iraqi; Sunni: Turkish, Albanian). The Shepparton Albanian Mosque is the first and oldest mosque in Victoria, built (late 1950s) by Albanian Australians whose local presence dates back to the interwar period.

== Governance ==
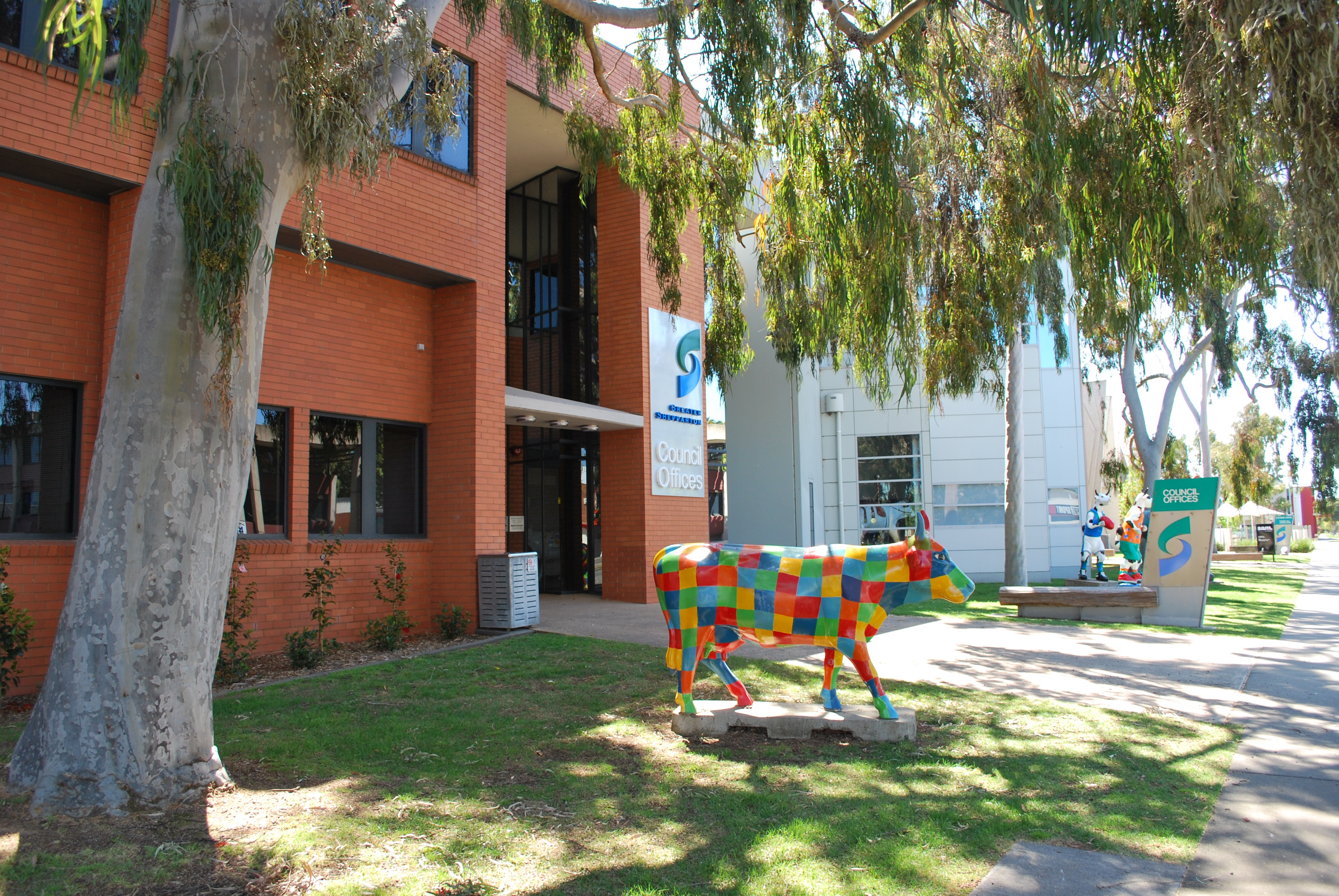
City of Greater Shepparton Council Complex at Welsford Street

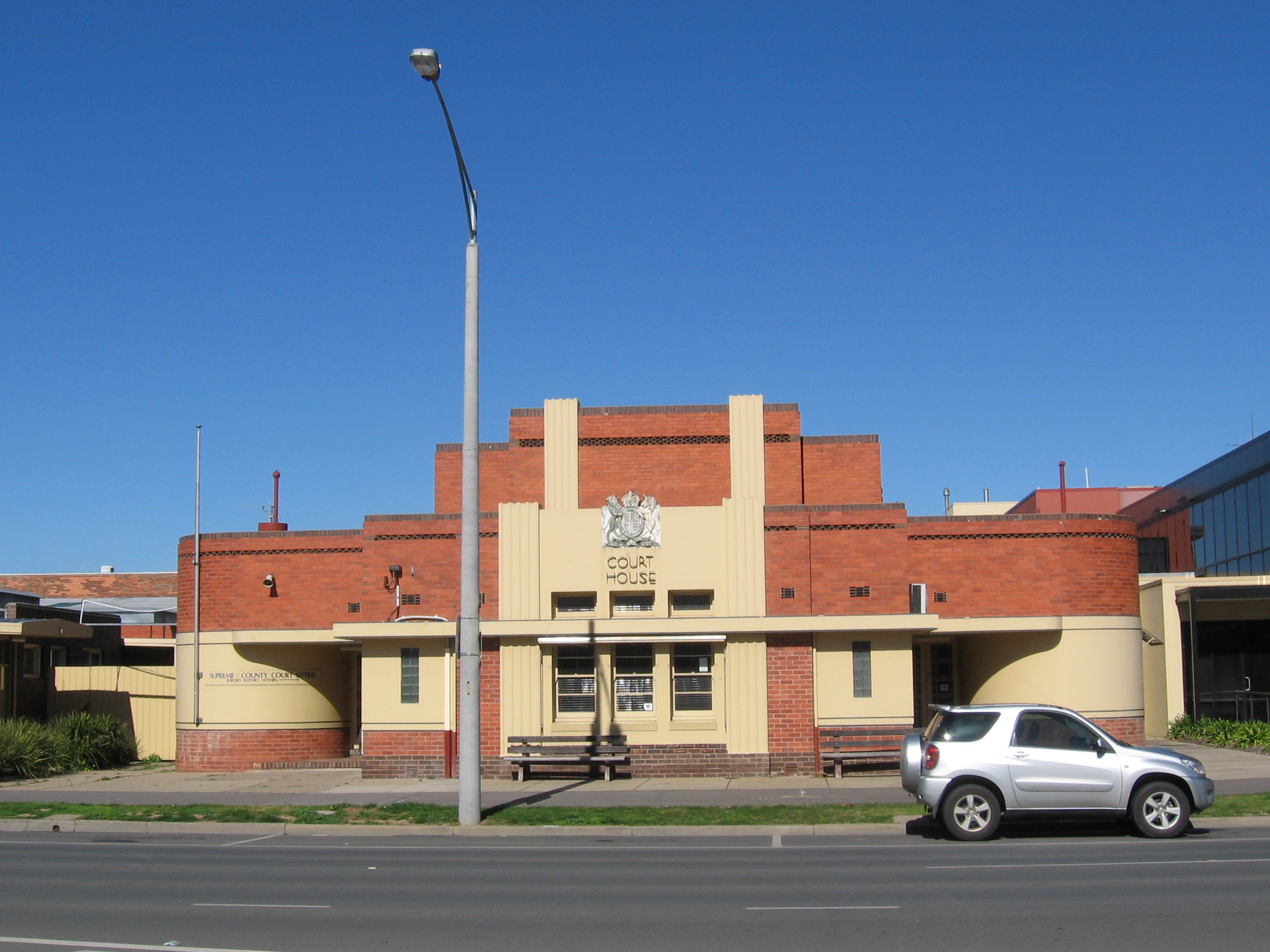
Former courts, part of the regional courts complex on High Street

Shepparton is the seat of local government and administrative centre for the City of Greater Shepparton Local Government Area. The council was formed in 1994 from the amalgamation of the City of Shepparton, Shire of Shepparton, and parts of the Shire of Rodney, Shire of Euroa, Shire of Goulburn, Shire of Tungamah, Shire of Violet Town and Shire of Waranga. The council office complex is located at 90 Welsford Street and the council meets in the Chambers there. The council consists of nine councillors, elected once every four years by postal voting.

In state politics, Shepparton is located in the Legislative Assembly district of Shepparton which had been safely held by the National/Country Party since the seat was created in 1945. In the 2014 Victorian state election, Independent candidate Suzanna Sheed won the seat, with former mayor Kim O'Keefe winning the seat back for the Nationals in 2022.

In federal politics, Shepparton is located in a single House of Representatives division—the Division of Nicholls. The Division, formerly the Division of Murray, has been a safe Coalition seat since its inception in 1949 and was the seat of John McEwen, 18th Prime Minister of Australia, as well the seat of Sharman Stone, currently Ambassador of Australia for Women and Girls, who served as member of parliament for the Division of Murray from 1996 to 2016.

Law enforcement is overseen from regional police headquarters in Welsford Street. It is one of two police stations in the urban area, with the second at Mooroopna and administers stations in several surrounding towns in the LGA. Justice is conducted at the Shepparton Courts complex at 14 High Street, a multi-jurisdictional centre that includes a Magistrates' Court, County Court, Victorian Civil and Administrative Tribunal (VCAT) and Coroners Court. Corrections, are handled locally at the Community Correctional Centre on Wyndham Street.

== Education ==
Shepparton has numerous primary schools, such as state schools Bourchier Street Primary, Gowrie Street Primary, Guthrie Street Primary, St Georges Road Primary School, Grahamvale Primary, Kialla West Primary, Kialla Primary, Wilmot Road Primary, Shepparton East Primary and Orrvale Primary. Catholic primary schools include St. Brendan's, St. Mel's, and St. Luke's. It also has two schools catering to students with disabilities, called Banmira Specialist School (formerly Verney Road School) and Berry Street School.

There were seven secondary schools in the Shepparton region: Mooroopna Secondary College, McGuire College, Shepparton Ace College, Shepparton High School, Wanganui Park Secondary College, the Catholic Notre Dame College, and the private Goulburn Valley Grammar School. However, in 2020, four of these schools (McGuire College, Shepparton High School, Mooroopna Secondary College and Wanganui Park Secondary College) merged to form the Greater Shepparton Secondary College (GSSC), using the previous schools' sites as campuses until the GSSC's buildings had finished construction on the former site of Shepparton High School.

The University of Melbourne's School of Rural Health and Rural Clinical School of the Faculty of Medicine, Dentistry and Health Sciences are also based in Shepparton.

La Trobe University also has a campus offering a range of degree programs including Arts, Business/Commerce, Nursing/Health Sciences, and Education. Approximately 400 students attend the university which provides day, evening, part-time, and full-time study options.

Goulburn Ovens Institute of TAFE has three campuses, one in Fryers Street which hosts the organisation's administration department as well as many teaching departments, the William Orr Campus, a 120 hectare property in Wanganui Road and another newer campus located in the vicinity of the McGuire College Australian Rules Football field and bus stop on Archer Street.

== Transport ==
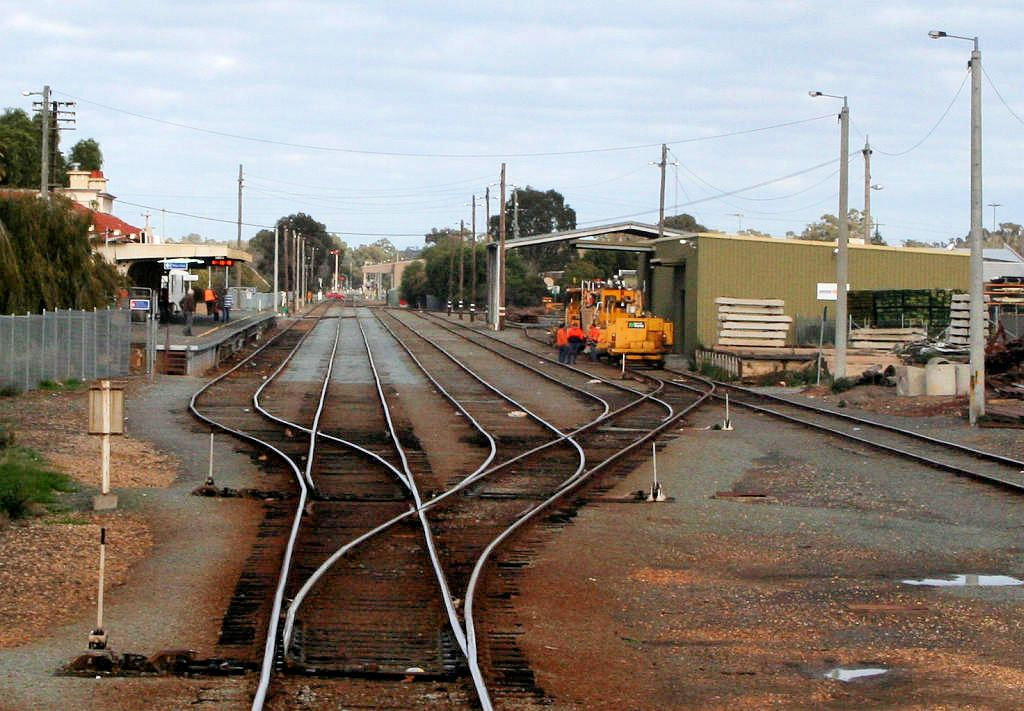
Shepparton railway station and goods yard

The city is located at the junction of the Midland Highway and the Goulburn Valley Highway, the latter which is being progressively converted to freeway standard. The Peter Ross-Edwards Causeway connects Shepparton to Mooroopna.

V/Line runs bus coach services to Wangaratta, Bendigo and Griffith, New South Wales. A dedicated bus service to Shepparton from Melbourne Airport is also run twice daily passing through Seymour and Nagambie.

Shepparton railway station is serviced by V/Line rail services on the Shepparton line to and from Melbourne and to Mooroopna.

Shepparton Airport, located south of the city on the Goulburn Valley Highway and is home to Gawne Aviation. Shepparton also has buses that run around the suburbs and Mooroopna

== Media ==
=== Newspapers ===
The Shepparton Adviser is a free newspaper delivered to a CAB-audited 32,004 homes, farms and businesses each week. This circulation equates to a conservative readership estimate of 70,000 per week (Circulation Audit Bureau) and includes direct delivery to 1,500 local RMB addresses via Australia Post. The Shepparton Adviser is independently owned and is the largest circulating established free newspaper in the Goulburn and Murray Valleys.

The Shepparton News is a paid morning daily newspaper published by the McPherson Media Group. It has an audited average daily distribution of 12–14,000. From the same publisher, The Country News, with an audited circulation of 55,000 is aimed at the farming community in the Goulburn Valley and surrounding regions, and is included as an insert in the Shepparton News, Riverine Herald (Echuca), Seymour Telegraph, Cobram Courier, McIvor Times (Heathcote), Pastoral Times (Deniliquin), Benalla Ensign, Euroa Gazette, Southern Riverina News (Finley), Kyabram Free Press and the Campaspe Valley News (Rochester).

=== Radio stations ===
- Radio National 621 AM / 756 AM (government-funded, mostly news, current affairs and the arts)
- ABC Radio Melbourne 774 AM (government-funded, mostly news and talkback)
- RSN Racing & Sport 1260 AM (narrowcast)
- Vision Radio Network 1413 AM (Christian and Gospel) – service operated by United Christian Broadcasters Australia Pty Ltd
- Raw FM 87.6 FM (dance music station)
- Triple J 94.5 FM (government-funded Youth Radio)
- Triple M Goulburn Valley 95.3 FM (commercial) – formerly known as 3SR FM.
- ABC Classic 96.1 FM (government-funded, classical music station)
- Hit96.9 96.9 FM (commercial) – formerly known as Star FM, originally Sun FM.
- ABC Shepparton 97.7 FM (government-funded local news, current affairs, light entertainment and talkback)
- ONE FM 98.5 FM (community / not-for-profit)
- Radio for the Print Handicapped 100.1 FM
- ABC NewsRadio 107.7 FM (government-funded national news, current affairs and parliamentary broadcasts)

=== Television stations ===
Shepparton is served by three commercial television networks and two publicly owned services:

- ABC (plus ABC HD, ABC Family, ABC Kids, ABC Entertains & ABC News)
- SBS (plus SBS HD, SBS2, SBS World Movies, SBS WorldWatch, SBS Food & NITV)
- Seven (formerly Prime7) (plus 7HD, 7two, 7mate, 7flix, 7Bravo, TVSN & Racing.com)
- WIN (plus 9HD, 9Gem, 9Go!, 9Life & Gold)
- 10 (plus 10 HD, 10 Drama, 10 Comedy, Nickelodeon, News24 Regional & SBN)

The new digital channels broadcast by all the networks in addition to the main stations are available on Freeview to viewers in Shepparton and the wider Goulburn and Murray Valley regions.

Of the three main commercial networks:

- WIN Television (previously GMV-6 and 'Television Victoria') airs a half-hour local WIN News bulletin each weeknight at 5.30pm (previously airs weeknights at 6pm), produced from a newsroom in the city and broadcast from studios in Wollongong.
- Network 10 (formerly Southern Cross 10) airs short local news and weather updates throughout the day, produced and broadcast from its Hobart studios.
- The Seven Network (formerly Prime7) airs short statewide weather updates throughout the day, with news updates consisting of national/international news during the evening, produced and broadcast from its Canberra studios.

10 Regional Victoria previously aired Weeknights, a local news magazine program each weeknight from March 2011 before ceasing local production in June 2015.

On 5 May 2011, analogue television transmissions ceased in regional Victoria and some border regions including the Goulburn Valley and parts of the Southern Riverina in New South Wales. All local free-to-air television services are now broadcasting in digital transmission only as part of the Federal Government's plan for Digital terrestrial television in Australia.

== Notable people ==
=== Academia ===
- Thomas Shadrach James – Linguist and herbalist
- Avni Sali – Surgeon and academic

=== Arts and music ===
- Adam Briggs – Musician
- Anson Cameron – Author
- Adam Donovan – Musician and founder of Augie March
- Joseph Furphy – Author
- Amanda Garner – Ballroom dancer
- Edward Harrington – Poet and author
- Sir Bernard Thomas Heinze – Musician
- John Longstaff – Painter
- Glenn Richards – Musician and founder of Augie March
- Danielle Rowe – Ballerina/choreographer
- Dave Williams – Musician, fashion icon, endorsee of fine percussives

=== Politics and business ===
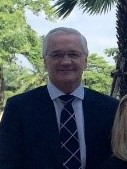
Damian Drum

- Douglas Alexandra – Architect
- Kaye Darveniza – Politician
- Damian Drum – Politician
- John Furphy – Inventor of the Furphy water-cart
- Don Kilgour – Politician and broadcaster
- Wendy Lovell – Politician
- Kim O'Keefe – Politician and Businesswoman
- Jeanette Powell – Politician
- Richard Pratt – Businessman
- John Richardson – Politician and author
- Suzanna Sheed – Politician and lawyer
- Sharman Stone – Politician, diplomat and activist
- Jim Short – Politician and diplomat
- Peter Ross-Edwards – Politician

=== Sport ===
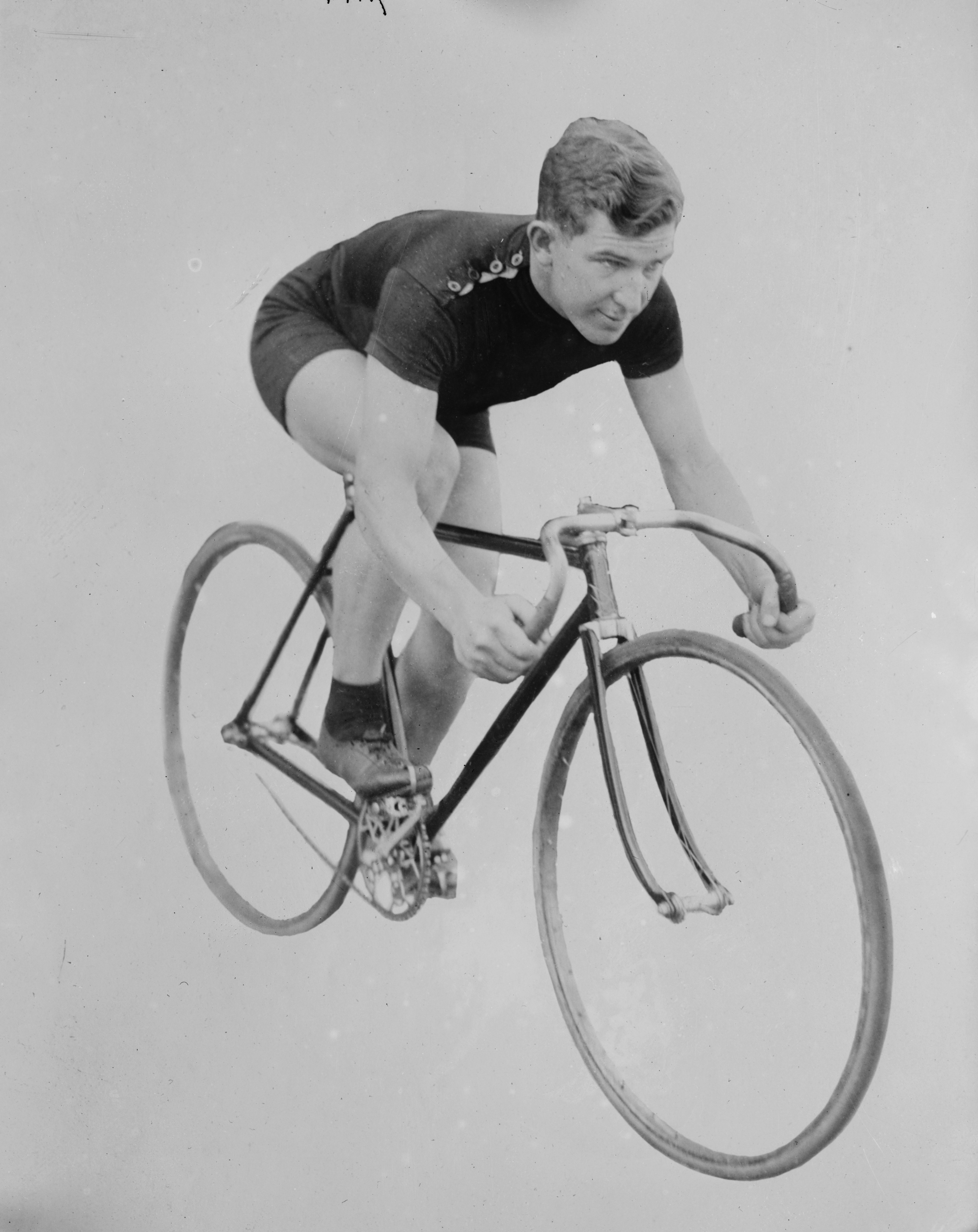
World Record Cyclist: Jackie Clark

- Michael Barlow – Australian rules footballer
- Alou Kuol – Footballer for VfB Stuttgart
- Aiden Blizzard – Cricketer
- Marc Bullen – Australian rules footballer
- Will Brodie – Australian rules footballer
- Shannon Byrnes – Australian rules footballer
- Max Carlos – Boxer
- A J "Jackie" Clark – Cyclist
- Peter Crimmins – Australian rules footballer
- Justin Davies – Australian rules footballer
- Louise Dobson – Field hockey fullback at the 1996 Olympics
- Kevin Doolan – Australian Motorcycle speedway racer
- Robert Enes – Footballer
- Angela Foley – Australian rules footballer
- Shaun Hart – Australian rules footballer
- Jarman Impey – Australian rules footballer
- Garry Jacobson − Supercars driver
- Glenn James – Australian rules football umpire
- Nikos Kalafatis – Soccer player
- Alex Keath – Cricketer and Australian rules footballer
- Steven King – Australian rules footballer
- Garang Kuol - Footballer
- Frankie Lagana – Footballer
- Rohan Larkin - Cricketer
- Brett Lancaster – Cyclist
- Vince Lia – Footballer
- Jarrod Lyle – Golfer
- Shane Naylor – Athlete
- Lee Naylor – Athlete
- Doug Palmer – Australian rules footballer
- Dwight Ritchie − Boxer
- Steele Sidebottom – Australian rules footballer
- Grant Thompson − Australian rules footballer
- Jason Traianidis – Australian rules footballer
- Cortnee Vine – Soccer player for Australia women's national soccer team
- David Wirrpanda – Australian rules footballer
- Adem Yze – Australian rules footballer

== Clubs and associations ==
- Shepparton Toastmasters (public speaking)
- Goulburn Valley Chinese Association (social connection)
- Shepparton Chess Club
- Gv rail club

== Environmental issues ==
=== Odour pollution from Wastewater Treatment Facility ===
The Goulburn Valley Water's Wastewater Treatment facility located in Shepparton emits a strong smell which has been an issue for the past 30 years. Despite improvements and the instalment of a new $10 million anaerobic lagoon cover in 2021, the smell remains and EPA Victoria has been doing odour surveillance in nearby areas and monitoring on site actions.

== Sister cities ==
- Novato, United States

== See also ==
- Electoral district of Shepparton
