= Sam Birrell =

Australian politician (born 1975)

Sam Birrell MP

Member of the Australian Parliament for Nicholls
- Incumbent
- Assumed office 21 May 2022
- Preceded by: Damian Drum

Personal details
- Born: Samuel Birrell; 5 April 1975 (age 51) Shepparton, Victoria, Australia
- Party: National
- Education: Shepparton High School; Assumption College, Kilmore; University of Melbourne, (BAppSc); La Trobe University (MBA)
- Occupation: Politician; Agronomist

Samuel Birrell (born 5 April 1975) is a member of the Australian House of Representatives representing the division of Nicholls in northern Victoria for the National Party since the 2022 Australian federal election.

== Early life ==
Birrell grew up on a property on Victoria's Goulburn River between the towns of Murchison and Toolamba. His father was a lawyer and his mother was a schoolteacher. He attended Shepparton High School for two years then completed his secondary education as a boarder at Assumption College, Kilmore. After leaving high school, Birrell worked on a farm in Ardmona for two years before completing a degree in agricultural science at the University of Melbourne's Dookie campus. He later completed an MBA at La Trobe University's Shepparton campus in 2017.

== Career ==
After graduating university, Birrell worked as an agronomist for a rural supplies business, specialising in pest identification and soil and leaf analysis. He later worked for irrigation supplier Netafim.

Birrell was appointed CEO of the Committee for Greater Shepparton in 2016. He resigned the position in 2021 to run for parliament.

== Politics ==
In January 2022, Birrell won Nationals preselection for the seat of Nicholls at the 2022 federal election, following the retirement of incumbent Nationals MP Damian Drum. He retained Nicholls for the Nationals on a substantially reduced primary vote, with significant swings to the Liberal candidate Steve Brooks and independent candidate Rob Priestly.

=== Political views ===
Birrell supported a Designated Area Migration Agreement (DAMA) for the Goulburn Valley. In 2021 he appeared before a parliamentary inquiry into skilled migration, advocating for "an immediate global recruitment campaign to attract migrants with in-demand skills" to help fill job shortages in regional areas.

Parliament of Australia
Preceded by Damian Drum	Member for Nicholls; 2022–present	Incumbent
