= Wanganui Park Secondary College =

Location
- Parkside Drive; Shepparton, Victoria 3630
- Coordinates: 36°21′27.86″S 145°23′28.3″E

Information
- Type: Secondary school
- Motto: Education Our Aid
- Principal: Ken Murray
- Grades: 7–12
- Enrolment: ~1,300
- Colors: Green, white, grey
- Nickname: WPSC
- Information: (+61) 03 5820 9900
- Website: Official website

Wanganui Park Secondary College was a Government secondary college, with an enrolment of about 1,300 students from years 7 to 12, in Shepparton, Victoria. It was amalgamated into Greater Shepparton Secondary College along with three other schools.

The school had a unique curriculum, with the most notable feature being its Vertical Modular Grouping (VMG) system, which allowed for a high degree of flexibility in students' unit selections from years 8 to 10. The school also offered enrolment for year 7, and for years 11 and 12, the Victorian Certificate of Applied Learning (VCAL) and Victorian Certificate of Education (VCE). Biology teacher Andrew Douch received the Microsoft Worldwide Innovative Teacher of the Year Award and the Victorian Education Excellence Award for curriculum innovation at the school. The school received a federal grant for a literacy and numeracy program. An innovative program called 'Learning to Learn' was implemented in 2009.

== Football team ==
The school's Australian rules football team competed in the regional MCC Herald Sun Country Shield tournament for several years.

== Notable alumni ==
- Adam Thompson – lead vocals in Chocolate Starfish
- Brett Lancaster – racing cyclist
- Adam Briggs – rapper and writer
- Grant Thompson – entrepreneur and rapper
- Steele Sidebottom – AFL player

== See also ==
- List of high schools in Victoria
- List of schools in Victoria
