= Adem Yze =

Australian rules footballer (born 1977)

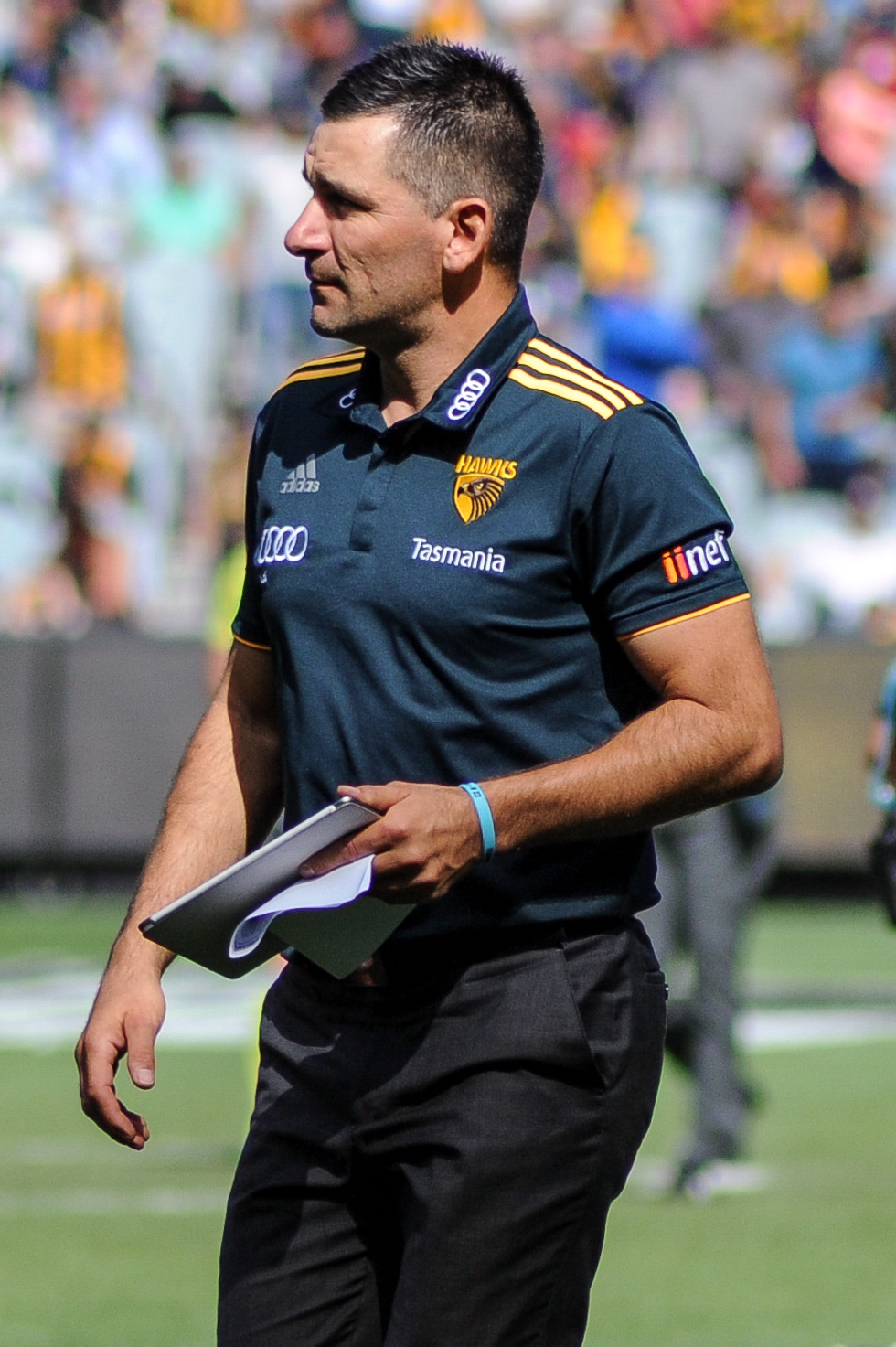
- Yze with Hawthorn in April 2017

Personal information
- Nickname: Pencil
- Born: 21 September 1977 (age 49); Shepparton
- Original team: Shepparton United
- Debut: Round 13, 1995, Melbourne vs. Richmond, at Melbourne Cricket Ground
- Height: 187 cm (6 ft 2 in)
- Weight: 87 kg (192 lb)

Playing career^{1}
Years	Club	Games (Goals)
1995–2008	Melbourne	271 (234)

Coaching career^{3}
Years	Club	Games (W–L–D)
2022	Melbourne	1 (1–0–0)
2024–	Richmond	69 (10–59–0)
Total		70 (11–59–0)
- ^{1} Playing statistics correct to the end of 2008.^{3} Coaching statistics correct as of 2026.

Career highlights
- Harold Ball Memorial Trophy: 1995; AFL Rising Star nominee: 1996; Keith 'Bluey' Truscott Medal: 2001; All-Australian team: 2002; Centenary Medal: 2001

Adem Yze (/ˈuːzeɪ/ OO-zay; born 21 September 1977) is an Australian rules football coach and former player. He played for the Melbourne Football Club in the Australian Football League (AFL), and is senior coach of the Richmond Football Club. Yze has made the fourth-highest number of appearances in the history of the Melbourne Football Club.

== Early life ==
Adem Yze is of Albanian descent and born in Shepparton, a regional city in Victoria, Australia. His father Sam was one of eight children who arrived during 1954 in Australia from a European refugee camp. Sam lived in Werribee, attended primary school and worked in market gardens. Yze's mother Vicki was one of ten children and born in Australia to Albanian parents from Yugoslavia. He has two brothers, Damien (born Yzeir) a Victorian cricketer and VFL player, and Rodney (born Ramadan).

The family moved to the Goulburn Valley and owned fruit orchards. As a child, Yze helped the family as a fruit picker at their orchards. He supported the Essendon Football Club, while the family either supported Richmond or Melbourne. Yze was educated at Shepparton High School. He played several sports in his youth and later was a player for the Murray Bushrangers Football Club, where his performances attracted the attention of the Melbourne Football Club.

== Playing career ==
=== Melbourne ===
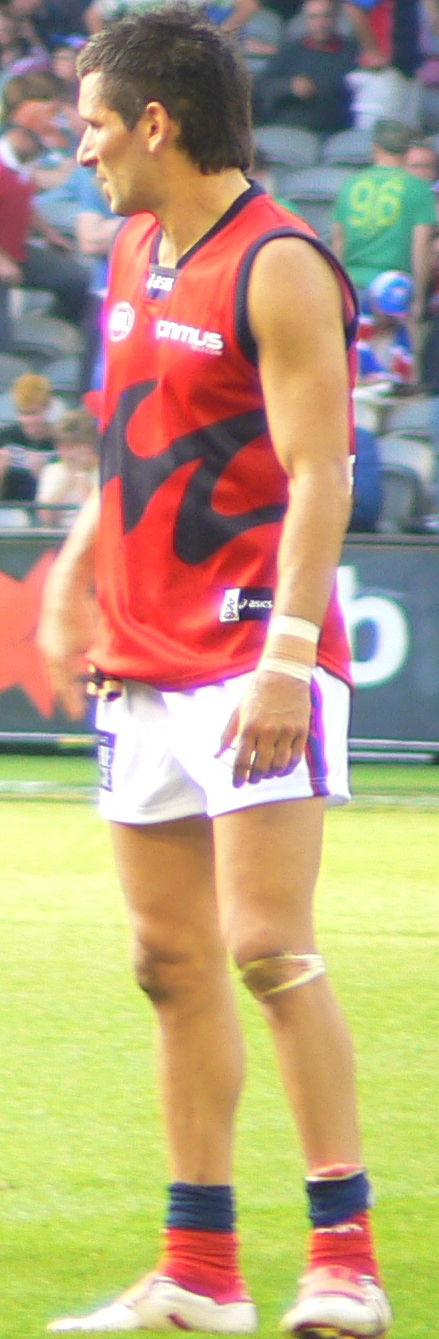
Yze in 2007

Taken at No. 16 in the 1994 National AFL Draft, and debuting in 1995 with Melbourne, he was a near-permanent fixture with the club throughout his career. He remained remarkably consistent in this time, moving from half-back to the midfield and towards the end of his playing career moving between half-forward and half-back. Yze led the league for kicks in 2001, 2002 and 2004, while coming third behind Scott Camporeale and Nathan Buckley in 2000.

In 2007, Yze struggled with his form during the pre-season. After a disappointing performance against St Kilda in round 1, his streak of 226 consecutive AFL appearances was put to an end, with Melbourne deciding to drop him for the round 2 game against Hawthorn. Yze was then selected for Melbourne's round 4 match against Fremantle and picked up a career-high 38 possessions and kicked one goal, being named as one of the best on ground for the day. Despite seeing very little first-division action in 2008—the last year of his contract at Melbourne—Yze declared his intention to continue playing football, even if that meant he entered the draft or played at VFL level. At 30, Yze felt he could play on for another two or three years.

Due to Melbourne's youth policy introduced at the end of the 2008 season, Adem was delisted after only six senior appearances for the year, in which he kicked five goals. Yze expressed his desire to play on at another AFL club in 2009, declaring he would apply for the pre-season draft, yet he conceded he had "stuff all" chances of being picked up by another club.

Yze played for Melbourne from 1995 until 2008 for a total of 271 games and kicked a total of 234 goals.

=== Other leagues ===
However, Yze declared he would play on regardless in 2009, even if it was at a suburban club, such as East Burwood, where his brother Damian played. Yze played with the Box Hill Hawks and joined the Shepparton Swans a year later.

In 2013 and 2014, he played with second division clubs Glen Orden and West Footscray in the Western Region Football League.

Yze was known for his straight kicks and ability to kick goals from seemingly impossible angles. He kicked five goals in a game on five occasions.

== Coaching career ==
=== Hawthorn Football Club assistant coach (2012–2020) ===
In January 2012, Yze joined Hawthorn as a part-time assistant coach under senior coach Alastair Clarkson.

On 14 November 2014, Yze replaced Luke Beveridge as Hawthorn's backline coach under senior coach Alastair Clarkson, after previously working with the Hawks as a specialist goal-kicking and development coach for the past three seasons. Yze was credited for playing a key role in harnessing the Hawthorn players' elite kicking skills as they developed into the AFL's deadliest team in front of goal over the past two seasons, with the team's accuracy increasing from 48 per cent to 57.1 per cent during his tenure as goalkicking coach.

=== Melbourne Football Club assistant coach (2021–2023) ===
After six seasons as a Hawthorn assistant coach, Yze was appointed assistant coach at Melbourne under senior coach Simon Goodwin for the 2021 season. The Demons would have an outstanding 2021 season in which they finished on top of the ladder and were a dominant team throughout the regular season and the finals series which was capped off with a commanding victory over the Western Bulldogs to win the 2021 premiership. Yze was a key architect in creating their league best defence that was a key factor in their historic premiership win. In the 2022 season Melbourne would continue their dominant ways extending the winning streak to 17 games, until the second half of the year in which momentum was halted and they struggled with consistency. Yze continued his role as midfield coach overseeing arguably the best midfield in the competition while their team defence still remained elite and one of the top in the competition. Near the end of the season Yze was heavily linked to the vacant GWS and Essendon senior coaching roles, however the roles were eventually awarded to then Richmond assistant coach Adam Kingsley and Brad Scott respectively. Yze left the Melbourne Football Club at the end of the 2023 season.

=== Richmond Football Club senior coach (2024–present) ===
Yze was appointed senior coach of the Richmond Football Club on 21 September 2023. Yze replaced caretaker senior coach Andrew McQualter, who replaced Damien Hardwick after Hardwick stepped down in the middle of the 2023 season.

In Yze's first season as Richmond senior coach, the club won only two matches for the year, finishing with the wooden spoon for the first time since 2007 as they underwent a significant rebuild of its playing list.

== Statistics ==
=== Playing statistics ===
Legend
G	Goals	K	Kicks	D	Disposals	T	Tackles
B	Behinds	H	Handballs	M	Marks

Led the league after finals only
Led the league after season and finals

Season	Team	No.	Games	Totals							Averages (per game)							Votes
Season	Team	No.	Games	G	B	K	H	D	M	T	G	B	K	H	D	M	T	Votes
1995	Melbourne	44	9	3	4	55	23	78	17	8	0.3	0.4	6.1	2.6	8.7	1.9	0.9	0
1996	Melbourne	13	19	9	8	136	40	176	48	16	0.5	0.4	7.2	2.1	9.3	2.5	0.8	0
1997	Melbourne	13	19	9	16	203	34	237	62	21	0.5	0.8	10.7	1.8	12.5	3.3	1.1	0
1998	Melbourne	13	25	7	5	394	95	489	110	37	0.3	0.2	15.8	3.8	19.6	4.4	1.5	0
1999	Melbourne	13	22	10	5	269	79	348	54	26	0.5	0.2	12.2	3.6	15.8	2.5	1.2	0
2000	Melbourne	13	25	37	23	411	123	534	104	42	1.5	0.9	16.4	4.9	21.4	4.2	1.7	14
2001	Melbourne	13	22	24	26	417	72	489	105	37	1.1	1.2	19.0	3.3	22.2	4.8	1.7	8
2002	Melbourne	13	24	19	13	441	105	546	106	67	0.8	0.5	18.4	4.4	22.8	4.4	2.8	17
2003	Melbourne	13	22	17	8	340	113	453	74	43	0.8	0.4	15.5	5.1	20.6	3.4	2.0	5
2004	Melbourne	13	23	19	21	410	104	514	99	54	0.8	0.9	17.8	4.5	22.3	4.3	2.3	14
2005	Melbourne	13	23	41	34	270	52	322	99	34	1.8	1.5	11.7	2.3	14.0	4.3	1.5	7
2006	Melbourne	13	24	30	16	356	120	476	128	44	1.3	0.7	14.8	5.0	19.8	5.3	1.8	5
2007	Melbourne	13	8	4	6	111	54	165	36	16	0.5	0.8	13.9	6.8	20.6	4.5	2.0	0
2008	Melbourne	13	6	5	9	86	26	112	35	5	0.8	1.5	14.3	4.3	18.7	5.8	0.8	1
Career			271	234	194	3899	1040	4939	1077	450	0.9	0.7	14.4	3.8	18.2	4.0	1.7	71

=== Coaching statistics ===
As of the end of the 2026 season.

Team	Year	Home and Away Season					Finals			
Team	Year	Won	Lost	Drew	Win %	Position	Won	Lost	Win %	Result
MEL*	2022	1	0	0	1.000	Caretaker	–	–	–	–
MEL Total		1	0	0	1.000					
RIC	2024	2	21	0	.087	18th out of 18	–	–	–	–
RIC	2025	5	18	0	.217	17th out of 18	–	–	–	–
RIC	2026	3	20	0	.130	17th out of 18	–	–	–	–
RIC Total		10	59	0	.145					
Career Total		11	59	0	.157					

* Caretaker coach

== Honours and achievements ==
- Individual
  - Keith 'Bluey' Truscott Medal: 2001
  - All-Australian: 2002
  - Australian Representative Honours in International Rules Football: 2000, 2002
  - AFL Rising Star Nominee: 1996 (Round 11)
  - Centenary Medal: 2001

== Personal life ==
Yze is a nominal Muslim. He was the second Muslim overall to play in the AFL. Yze is married to Afijet and have two children, Jasmine and Noah.
