= Electoral district of Shepparton =

State electoral district of Victoria, Australia

Coordinates: 36.1600°S 145.3100°E

Shepparton Victoria—Legislative Assembly
- Interactive map of electoral district boundaries from the 2022 state election
- State: Victoria
- Dates current: 1945–1955; 1967–present
- MP: Kim O'Keeffe
- Party: National
- Namesake: Shepparton
- Electors: 48,765 (2018)
- Area: 3,289 km^{2} (1,269.9 sq mi)
- Demographic: Provincial and rural
Electorates around Shepparton:
New South Wales	New South Wales	New South Wales
Murray Plains	Shepparton	Ovens Valley
Euroa	Euroa	Euroa

The electoral district of Shepparton is a rural Lower House electoral district of the Victorian Parliament. It is located within the Northern Victoria Region of the Legislative Council.

The electoral district of Shepparton covers an area of 3,289 square kilometres.

Shepparton includes the country towns of Ardmona, Barmah, Congupna, Dookie, Katunga, Kialla, Mooroopna, Nathalia, Picola, Shepparton, Strathmerton, Tallygaroopna, Tatura and Toolamba. The district also includes the Barmah National Park.

It is a rich agricultural area with orchards, vineyards and dairy farms. Much of the electorate is an important irrigation area served by water from the Main East Goulburn Channel. The rest of the land is used for pasture, fodder crops and cattle and sheep grazing.

Shepparton was held by the National/Country Party from its creation in 1945 until 2014, although it was abolished for a twelve-year period between 1955 and 1967. The current member is National Kim O'Keeffe, who was elected at the 2022 state election, defeating Independent Suzanna Sheed, who was elected in the 2014 election.

== Members for Shepparton ==
=== First incarnation (1945–1955) ===
Member	Party	Term
John McDonald	Country	1945–1955

=== Second incarnation (1967–present) ===
Member	Party	Term
Peter Ross-Edwards	Country	1967–1975
Peter Ross-Edwards	National	1975–1991
Don Kilgour	National	1991–2002
Jeanette Powell	National	2002–2014
Suzanna Sheed	Independent	2014–2022
Kim O'Keeffe	National	2022–present

== Election results ==
2022 Victorian state election: Shepparton
Party	Candidate	Votes	%	±%
National	Kim O'Keeffe	13,242	32.06	+19.03
Independent	Suzanna Sheed	12,146	29.41	−8.99
Liberal	Cheryl Hammer	8,491	20.56	−6.00
Labor	Liam Cowan	3,285	7.95	−3.61
Greens	Ian Christoe	1,056	2.56	+0.14
Democratic Labour	Sueie McGrath	882	2.14	+2.14
Family First	Alison White	877	2.12	+2.12
Freedom	Diane M. Teasdale	807	1.95	+1.95
Animal Justice	Katherine Taylor	515	1.25	+1.25
Total formal votes		41,301	93.94	−0.58
Informal votes		2,663	6.06	+0.58
Turnout		43,964	86.21	−3.37
Notional two-party-preferred count
National	Kim O'Keeffe	30,704	74.34	+12.62
Labor	Liam Cowan	10,597	25.66	−12.62
Two-candidate-preferred result
National	Kim O'Keeffe	23,455	56.79	+12.09
Independent	Suzanna Sheed	17,846	43.21	−12.09
National gain from Independent		Swing	N/A	
