= Jeanette Powell =

Australian politician

The Honourable Jeanette Powell AM

Minister for Local Government Minister for Aboriginal Affairs
- In office 2 December 2010 – 17 March 2014
- Premier: Ted Baillieu; Denis Napthine
- Preceded by: Richard Wynne
- Succeeded by: Tim Bull

Member of the Victorian Parliament for Shepparton
- In office 30 November 2002 – 29 November 2014
- Preceded by: Don Kilgour
- Succeeded by: Suzanna Sheed

Personal details
- Born: 4 February 1949 (age 77) Prescot, England
- Party: National Party
- Website: jeanettepowell.com.au

Elizabeth Jeanette Powell AM (born 4 February 1949) is a British-born Australian politician. She was a National Party member of the Victorian Legislative Assembly from 2002 to 2014, representing the electorate of Shepparton. She was previously a member of the Victorian Legislative Council from 1996 to 2002, representing North Eastern Province.

Powell was born in Prescot, Merseyside, England and emigrated to Australia as a child. After a short time in the Melbourne suburb of Preston, the family moved to Shepparton in regional Victoria. Prior to entering parliament, Powell held a variety of occupations including film processor, television presenter, singer, marketing and sales, office manager and director of the family auto-electrics business. She was a Shire of Shepparton councillor from 1990 to 1994, and was the shire president from 1993 to 1994. After the 1994 council amalgamations, Powell was appointed as a commissioner with the Shire of Campaspe from 1994 to 1996.

Powell was elected to the Legislative Council seat of North-Eastern Province at the 1996 state election, becoming the first woman to represent the National Party in Victoria. In 2002, she shifted to the Legislative Assembly, successfully retaining the seat of Shepparton for the National Party upon the retirement of long-serving MP Don Kilgour. She was appointed state Minister for Local Government and Minister for Aboriginal Affairs following the Liberal-National Coalition's victory at the 2010 election, and served in those roles under both Premiers Ted Baillieu and Denis Napthine.

In February 2014 Powell announced that she would not be a candidate at the forthcoming 2014 Victorian State Election, and in a reshuffle of the Coalition ministry in March 2014, her portfolios were allocated to Tim Bull.

In 2022, Powell was appointed Member of the Order of Australia in the 2022 Queen's Birthday Honours for "significant service to the people and Parliament of Victoria, and to the community".

Powell is married with two sons.

Victorian Legislative Council
Preceded by David Evans	Member for North Eastern Province; 1996–2002	Succeeded by Wendy Lovell
Victorian Legislative Assembly
Preceded by Don Kilgour	Member for Shepparton; 2002–2014	Succeeded by Suzanna Sheed
Political offices
Preceded by Richard Wynne	Minister for Local Government; 2010–2014	Succeeded by Tim Bull
Preceded by Richard Wynne	Minister for Aboriginal Affairs; 2010–2014	Succeeded by Tim Bull
