= Suzanna Sheed =

Australian politician

Suzanna Sheed AM
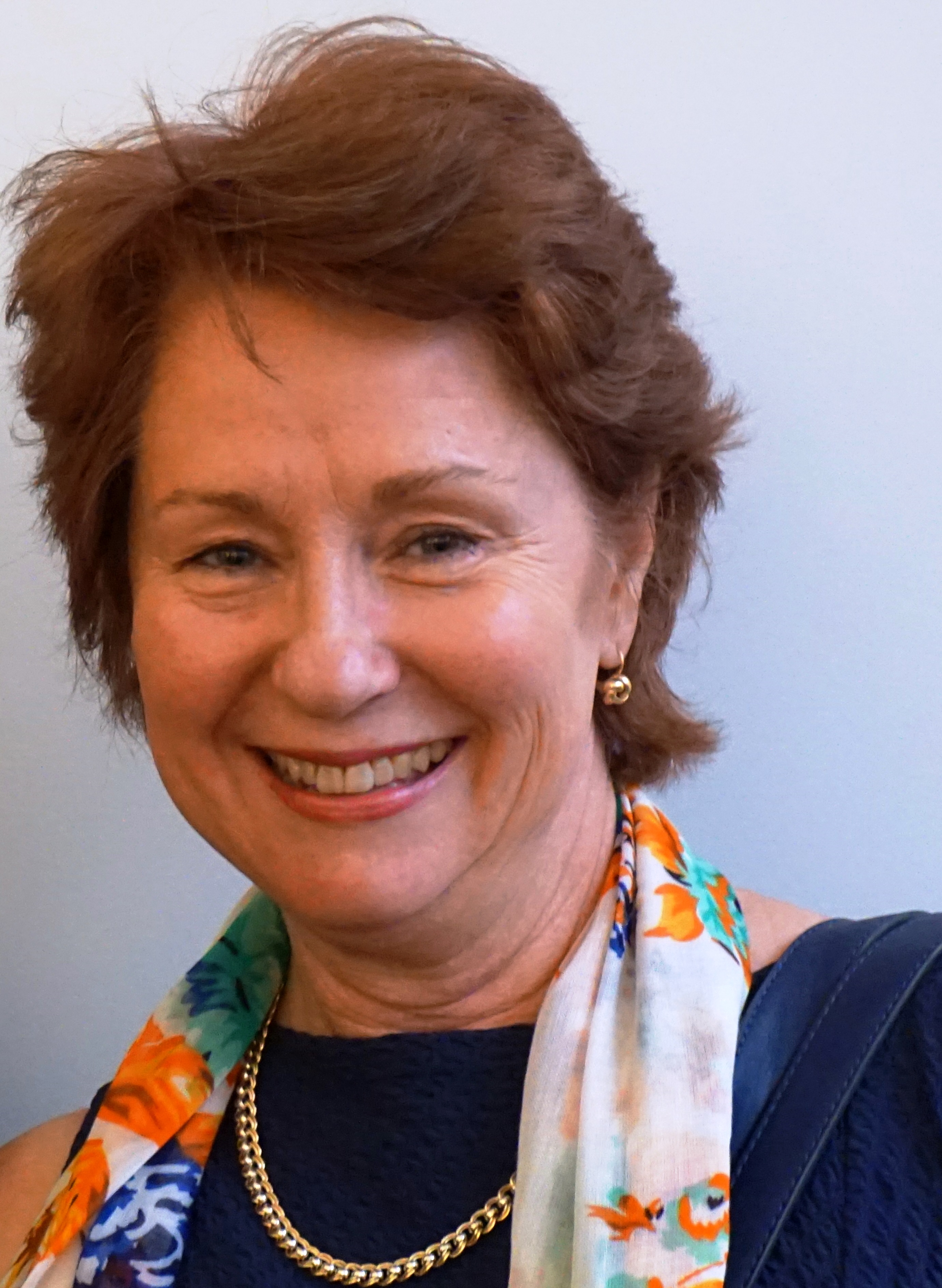

Member of the Victorian Legislative Assembly for Shepparton
- In office 29 November 2014 – 26 November 2022
- Preceded by: Jeanette Powell
- Succeeded by: Kim O'Keeffe

Personal details
- Born: 14 March 1954 (age 72) Riverina, New South Wales, Australia
- Party: Independent
- Spouse: Peter Eastaugh
- Education: University of Melbourne
- Profession: Lawyer
- Website: suzannasheed.com.au

Suzanna Sheed AM (born 14 March 1954) is an Australian politician. She was an independent member of the Victorian Legislative Assembly from the 2014 state election until 2022, representing the electorate of Shepparton.

== Career ==
Before entering politics, Sheed worked as a lawyer in regional Victoria for more than 40 years and held board positions with the RACV, Goulburn–Murray Water and the Law Institute of Victoria.

At the 2014 Victorian state election, she won the previously safe Coalition seat of Shepparton as an independent, and she was re-elected in 2018. In parliament, she served on the Legislative Assembly Standing Orders Committee from 2019 to 2022 and chaired the Pandemic Declaration Accountability and Oversight Committee from December 2021 to October 2022.

At the 2022 Victorian state election, she lost the seat to Kim O'Keeffe of the Nationals.

On 8 June 2023, the Victorian Government appointed Sheed to the panel of administrators that replaced the dismissed Moira Shire Council. She stepped down from the panel on 7 February 2025 to spend more time with her family.

== Personal life ==
Sheed was appointed a Member of the Order of Australia in the 2024 Australia Day Honours for her "significant service to the people and Parliament of Victoria, and to the community".

Victorian Legislative Assembly
Preceded by Jeanette Powell	Member for Shepparton; 2014–2022	Succeeded by Kim O'Keeffe
