= TKOR =

YouTube channel

YouTube information
- Channel: TKOR
- Years active: 2010–present
- Genres: DIY; Experiment
- Subscribers: 12.5 million
- Views: 3.7 billion
- Last updated: November 20, 2025

TKOR (formerly known as The King of Random) is a YouTube channel created by Grant Thompson that originally conducted DIY projects and experiments, often involving large amounts of a single item. Thompson created the channel in 2010 and operated it until his death in 2019. The channel is now run by Thompson's friends and family and no longer has a DIY focus, but produces content such as "life hacks, experiments, and random weekend projects."

The channel was originally hosted solely by Thompson, and then by sculptors Nate Bonham and Calli Gade, later joined by meteorologist Grace Dirig. Bonham and Gade left TKOR in 2021 citing creative differences with TKOR management and a downturn in viewership.

As of July 29, 2024, the channel has 12.5 million subscribers. TKOR maintains three other channels: "2KOR", for behind-the-scenes and other content, "TKOR Shorts", for use of YouTube's "Shorts" feature, and "The King of Random en Español", for videos from the main channel translated into Spanish.

== History ==
At the age of 29, Grant Thompson, who was an airline pilot in Farmington, Utah, became deeply interested in studying the way things worked. Thompson began tinkering with things and doing random household projects in his spare time. Eventually, Thompson realized that his friends were becoming interested in his projects, and had the idea to film some of them and upload them to YouTube.

On January 3, 2010, he created a YouTube channel with the name "01032010814", the exact date and time Thompson created the channel. The second video he uploaded to the channel in 2010 was the start of his DIY and life hack videos.

However, it was not until late 2011 that Thompson began actively pursuing the idea of creating a branded YouTube channel devoted to life hack videos. A few years prior, a friend of Thompson's had told him that he was the "King of Random" because of all of the random things he was always involved with. Thompson thought this would be a good name for his YouTube channel and started making plans to convert his existing channel to "The King of Random" in early 2012.

The first video Thompson released under his newly named channel was published on September 6, 2012, and was titled "How to Make Slime (Ninja Turtle Ooze)".

Prior to releasing the first King of Random video, Thompson had limited video editing experience. He purchased the original King of Random metallic ball intro clip from a freelancer in Asia, and started toying around with it on his neighbor's computer in Adobe Premiere. He then purchased Adobe Premiere for himself and was determined to create a channel with high quality content, by spending countless hours teaching himself how to film and edit his own videos.

Due to the early success of his channel, Thompson realized that it had the potential to grow with a steady release of quality content. He quickly transformed his basement into a creation studio for many years worth of projects that he had ideas for. Thompson continued to produce his own videos for the first couple years of the channel, but due to growing popularity and success, Thompson began to hire additional help with the production side of the channel.

The King of Random grew so quickly from its inception that Thompson was flying as an airline pilot less and less as time went on and ultimately retired from flying to focus solely on his YouTube channel.

On September 9, 2017, the channel introduced Nate Bonham as co-host and he became the permanent host a few weeks later.

On October 25, 2018, the channel introduced Calli Gade as co-host. Thompson reportedly stepped away to spend more time with family, but still owned the channel and was involved in its day-to-day operations until his death. Ownership of the channel passed to Thompson's wife Janae after his death in July 2019.

In September 2020, the channel added Kennen Hutchison, Grace Dirig, and Kevin DeBruin as co-hosts. They acted as "secondary" hosts to Nate and Calli, with Nate, Calli, and one of the newer hosts in each video. On March 24, 2021, The King of Random Team created a second supporting channel, "2KOR" where they would post support experiments, reactions, behind-the-scenes, bloopers, and more.

In early 2021, DeBruin and Hutchison stopped appearing on the channel. In a Reddit comment made by Bonham, he said DeBruin was unable to reach an agreement with the channel to continue appearing. In May 2021, the channel changed its name from "The King of Random" to "TKOR".

Gade announced her departure from the channel on July 9, 2021. In her Twitch stream, Gade mentioned that it was not her choice to leave the channel. She also said, "It's really sad. I would've had stayed with TKOR for the rest of my life, but I understand that they got to move into a different direction and they've got to do what's best for them."

The channel was then hosted solely by Bonham and Dirig. This was later corroborated by a Reddit post made by Thompson's widow Janae who also said Hutchison would be returning to the channel's studio to film more videos once COVID-19 pandemic restrictions lifted.

On July 16, 2021, TKOR announced the Grant Thompson Outward Bound Scholarship.

On November 15, 2021, TKOR released the first episode of their weekly podcast Random Theory. The podcast is hosted by Grace Dirig and Josh Alvey and explores scientific questions in a fun and engaging manner.

On December 27, 2021, Bonham, as well as the channel's primary cameraman and longest-tenured employee, were fired, leaving Dirig as the sole host. Bonham and Gade have since collaborated on several projects after both leaving TKOR.

== Explosives charges ==
In January 2018, Thompson was charged with two counts of second-degree felony possession of an explosive device for allegedly conducting incendiary experiments in his backyard. Facing a maximum of 15 years in prison, Thompson agreed to a plea bargain deal. In exchange for dropping the charges to a suspended sentence of misdemeanor recklessness with an incendiary device charge, Thompson agreed to create two YouTube videos educating viewers about the "physical safety and/or the legal risks associated with experiments that could be dangerous".

== Death of Grant Thompson ==
On July 29, 2019, Thompson died in a paragliding accident near Hurricane, Utah, in Washington County, Utah. His family had reported him missing around 10:30 pm to the Washington County Sheriff's Office (WCSO) after he did not return from the trip that day. Officers connected to a GPS locator he carried with him; they found his body along with a recording device. In response to his death, the King of Random channel uploaded a video titled, "Grant Thompson, in Memoriam" to YouTube on July 30. The video is exactly one minute long, and it is simply a picture of Thompson with the caption, "Grant Thompson, 1980–2019". YouTube also stated that they were "deeply saddened to hear about Grant Thompson's tragic loss".

The deadly accident was caught on film as Thompson was recording at the time from a camera mounted to his paramotor, which aided the police in their investigation into what caused the accident. According to law enforcement, a sudden change in updraft collapsed Thompson's parachute. He attempted to deploy the reserve chute but was too close to the ground (about 100 feet (30 m)) for it to be effective. Thompson died on impact, roughly 4 seconds after the parachute malfunctioned.

On August 1, a video titled "Thank you, Grant" was uploaded to the channel, in which a somber Nate and Calli presented a montage of Thompson's various experiments, spliced with clips of him discussing how far the channel had come. In this video, Nate confirmed that the channel would be continuing to upload, stating it was what Thompson would have wanted. It was the first time either host had appeared in a video since Thompson's death three days before.

On August 8, the channel posted a video titled "A Tribute To Grant From Fellow Creators." It compiled tributes from other YouTube personalities, notably MatPat (Matthew Patrick) from the channel "The Game Theorists", Brian Brushwood from the channel The Modern Rogue, and Zack Nelson from the channel JerryRigEverything.

Furthermore, on August 10, the channel posted a video titled "To Grant, From the TKOR Team," which compiled short tributes from all of the channel staff, including Nate and Calli. This was the final memorial video; the channel has continued its normal upload schedule since. Thompson was also featured by PewDiePie on his own version of YouTube Rewind 2019.

== Book ==
Thompson had been working on a book, "52 Random Weekend Projects," in the months prior to his death. The book was "almost finished" at the time of Thompson's death, and was completed by the production crew of the channel. The book contains 52 of Thompson's favorite projects done on the channel and was released on March 10, 2020.
