= Kim O'Keeffe =

Australian politician

Kim O'Keeffe MP

Member of the Victorian Legislative Assembly for Shepparton
- Incumbent
- Assumed office 26 November 2022
- Preceded by: Suzanna Sheed

Personal details
- Political party: National

Kim O'Keeffe is an Australian politician belonging to the Nationals who is the current member for the district of Shepparton in the Victorian Legislative Assembly. She won the seat in the 2022 state election over Suzanna Sheed.

Prior to her running for state parliament, she was the mayor of the City of Greater Shepparton.
