= Don Kilgour =

Australian politician

Donald Kilgour OAM (born 16 April 1946) is a former Australian politician. He was the National member for Shepparton in the Victorian Legislative Assembly from 1991 to 2002.

Kilgour was born in Numurkah, Victoria, to Leonard Leslie Kilgour and Jean Venables. He was educated at Katamatite Primary School, Numurkah High School and Lee Murray Radio College before becoming a radio announcer on 3UL Warragul in 1965. In 1967 he moved to 3SR Shepparton, where he was also studio manager. He married Cheryl Joan Cooper on 29 March 1969, with whom he had three children. In 1974 he became a sports commentator on both radio and television.

In 1974 Kilgour became active in the Country Party as media manager for the state seat of Shepparton and the federal seat of Murray.

In 1991, Kilgour was selected as the National candidate to contest a by-election for the Shepparton seat, which had been vacated by Peter Ross-Edwards. He was elected, and in 1992 became the National Party Whip in the Victorian Legislative Assembly. Following the Coalition's defeat in 1999, he became Secretary to the Shadow Cabinet. Kilgour retired in 2002.

Kilgour was awarded a Medal of the Order of Australia (OAM) in the 2018 Australia Day Honours, "For service to the people and Parliament of Victoria."

Kilgour is the host of a podcast called "The Golden Days of Radio" in which he looks at the history of radio in the 1950s, 60s and 70s in Australia and its impact on society and culture.

Parliament of Victoria
Preceded by Peter Ross-Edwards	Member for Shepparton; 1991–2002	Succeeded by Jeanette Powell
