= Shepparton High School =

Location
- 31–71 Hawdon Street; Shepparton, Victoria, 3630; Australia
- Coordinates: 36°22′19″S 145°24′55.5″E

Information
- Type: Public high school
- Motto: Labour Conquers All
- Opened: 20 April 1909
- Closed: December 2019
- Principal: Christine Cole
- Years offered: 7–12
- Enrolment: 638
- Colours: Navy blue and white
- Website: www.shs.vic.edu.au

Shepparton High School (SHS) was a public high school in Shepparton, Victoria, Australia. It opened in 1909 as Shepparton Agricultural High School – the first high school in Shepparton and one of the first public high schools in Victoria. It closed in December 2019 to make way for the construction of Greater Shepparton Secondary College, which opened in 2022.

== History ==
The school was first opened on 20 April 1909 as Shepparton Agricultural High School, with a roll of 31 students. The Governor of Victoria, Sir Thomas Gibson-Carmichael, formally opened the school a month later, on 20 May. The ceremony was attended by the Director of Education, Frank Tate, the Minister for Education, Alfred Billson, the Minister for Agriculture, George Graham, the Clerk of Parliaments, Sir George Jenkins, and various others. It was the first high school in Shepparton, and one of the first public high schools in the state of Victoria.

As one of the ten agricultural high schools created from 1907 to 1912, its agricultural aspect was intended to address a perceived need for better technical education in rural Victoria following the nationwide depression of the 1890s. To this end, each school was supplied with agricultural equipment and farmland with which to teach these skills. While Victoria's first high schools were vocational in name, their curriculum was still considerably academic. Besides the agricultural course, a more general course was also available to students, and was seen as a continuation of the state's existing primary education system.

A lack of local interest in the agricultural course meant that it did not last long. By 1914, only 9 of the 129 students enrolled at the school were taking the course. It was eventually replaced by a single subject, Agricultural Science, requiring little practical work, and by 1918, even the word "Agricultural" had been semi-officially dropped from the school's name. The school's farm fared better, proving valuable to the farmers and horticulturists of the area through its agricultural experiments. The farm also made a profit, which was unique among Victoria's agricultural high schools, and ensured its continued support throughout the 1920s. The Great Depression of the 1930s saw an end to that success, and the farmland was finally put up for sale in 1939.

== Notable alumni ==
- Frank McNamara (b. 1894), RAAF officer
- Francis Selleck (b. 1895), Melbourne mayor
- Richard Pratt (b. 1934), businessman
- Gail Gago (b. 1957), politician
- Peter Maynard (b. 1960), AFL footballer
- Stephen Tingay (b. 1970), AFL footballer
- Sam Birrell (b. 1975), politician
- Adem Yze (b. 1977), AFL footballer
- Steven King (b. 1978), AFL footballer
- Jarrod Lyle (b. 1981), professional golfer
- Adam Briggs (b. 1986), musical artist
- Jarman Impey (b. 1995), AFL footballer
