= Peter Ross-Edwards =

Australian politician

Peter Ross-Edwards AM
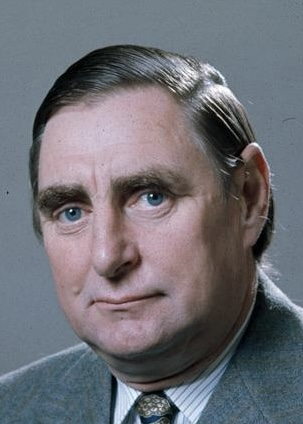

Member of the Victorian Legislative Assembly for Shepparton
- In office 29 April 1967 – 20 August 1991
- Preceded by: Seat created
- Succeeded by: Don Kilgour

Personal details
- Born: Peter Ross-Edwards; 11 July 1922 Corowa, New South Wales
- Died: 10 October 2012 (aged 90) Shepparton, Victoria
- Party: Nationals
- Spouse: Joy Elizabeth Perry (m. 1953)
- Occupation: Solicitor

Peter Ross-Edwards AM (11 July 1922 – 10 October 2012) was an Australian politician who served as Leader of the National Party in the Victorian Parliament from 1970 to 1988.

Ross-Edwards was born in Corowa to Rupert Ross-Edwards, a minister of religion, and Una Regan. He attended state schools in Corowa and then Geelong Grammar School, after which he enlisted in the Royal Australian Air Force in 1942. He served in the United Kingdom, Italy, North America and the Middle East as a flying officer, but shortly after he was discharged in 1946 he was hospitalised with tuberculosis, remaining in care until 1948.

After leaving hospital Ross-Edwards studied law at Melbourne University, graduating with a Bachelor's degree and becoming a solicitor. From 1952 he was a solicitor in Shepparton. On 27 April 1953 he married Joy Elizabeth Perry, with whom he had four sons and one daughter.

Ross-Edwards was also active in the Country Party, serving as secretary and treasurer of the Shepparton branch from 1957 to 1967. In 1967 he was elected to the Victorian Legislative Assembly as the member for Shepparton. He was elected parliamentary leader of the party in 1970, a post he held until 1988 (the party changed its name to the National Party of Australia in 1982).

Ross-Edwards was appointed a Member of the Order of Australia in 1989. Ross-Edwards resigned from parliament in 1991, and was Chief Commissioner of the City of Greater Bendigo from 1994 to 1995.

Ross-Edwards died on 10 October 2012.

Victorian Legislative Assembly
New seat	Member for Shepparton; 1967–1991	Succeeded by Don Kilgour
Party political offices
Preceded by George Moss	Leader of the National Party in Victoria; 1970–1988	Succeeded by Pat McNamara
