= Shire of Tungamah =

Coordinates: 36°09′S 145°52′E

- Local government area
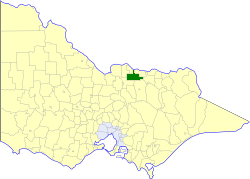
- Location in Victoria
- The Shire of Tungamah as at its dissolution in 1994
- Country: Australia
- State: Victoria
- Region: Goulburn Valley
- Established: 1878
- Council seat: Tungamah

Area
  - Total: 1,143 km^{2} (441 sq mi)

Population
  - Total: 3,030 (1992)
  - Density: 2.651/km^{2} (6.866/sq mi)
- County: Moira
LGAs around Shire of Tungamah
Numurkah	Cobram	Yarrawonga
Shepparton	Shire of Tungamah	Wangaratta
Shepparton	Benalla	Benalla

The Shire of Tungamah was a local government area in the Goulburn Valley region, about 240 kilometres (149 mi) northeast of Melbourne, the state capital of Victoria, Australia. The shire covered an area of 1,143 square kilometres (441.3 sq mi), and existed from 1878 until 1994.

== History ==
Tungamah was once part of the vast Echuca Road District, which formed in 1864, and became and a shire from 1871. It extended along the south bank of the Murray River, from Mount Hope Creek in the west, to the Ovens River in the east.

Tungamah was first incorporated as the Shire of Yarrawonga on 15 May 1878. On 17 April 1891, the East Riding, which contained the town of Yarrawonga, was severed and incorporated as the Shire of North Yarrawonga. As such, the shire was renamed Tungamah, after its main town, on 17 February 1893, and North Yarrawonga was renamed Yarrawonga on 12 May 1893. On 1 April 1953, the North West Riding also severed, becoming the Shire of Cobram.

On 18 November 1994, the Shire of Tungamah was abolished, and along with the Shires of Cobram, Nathalia, Numurkah and Yarrawonga, was merged into the newly created Shire of Moira. The Katandra West district was transferred to the newly created City of Greater Shepparton.

== Wards ==
The Shire of Tungamah was divided into four ridings on 1 October 1964, each of which elected three councillors:

- Central Riding
- South Riding
- South West (Katandra) Riding
- North West (Invergordon) Riding

== Towns and localities ==
- Almonds
- Boosey
- Boweya North
- Invergordon
- Katandra
- Lake Rowan
- Marunga
- Pelluebla
- St James
- Telford
- Tungamah*
- Waggarandall
- Youanmite
- Youarang
- Yundool

* Council seat.

== Population ==
Year	Population
1954	2,258
1958	2,300*
1961	2,446
1966	3,223
1971	3,147
1976	2,958
1981	2,813
1986	2,691
1991	2,912

* Estimate in the 1958 Victorian Year Book.
