= Shire of Yarrawonga =

Coordinates: 36°01′S 146°00′E

- Local government area
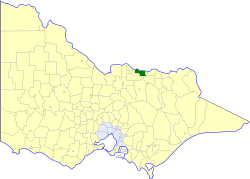
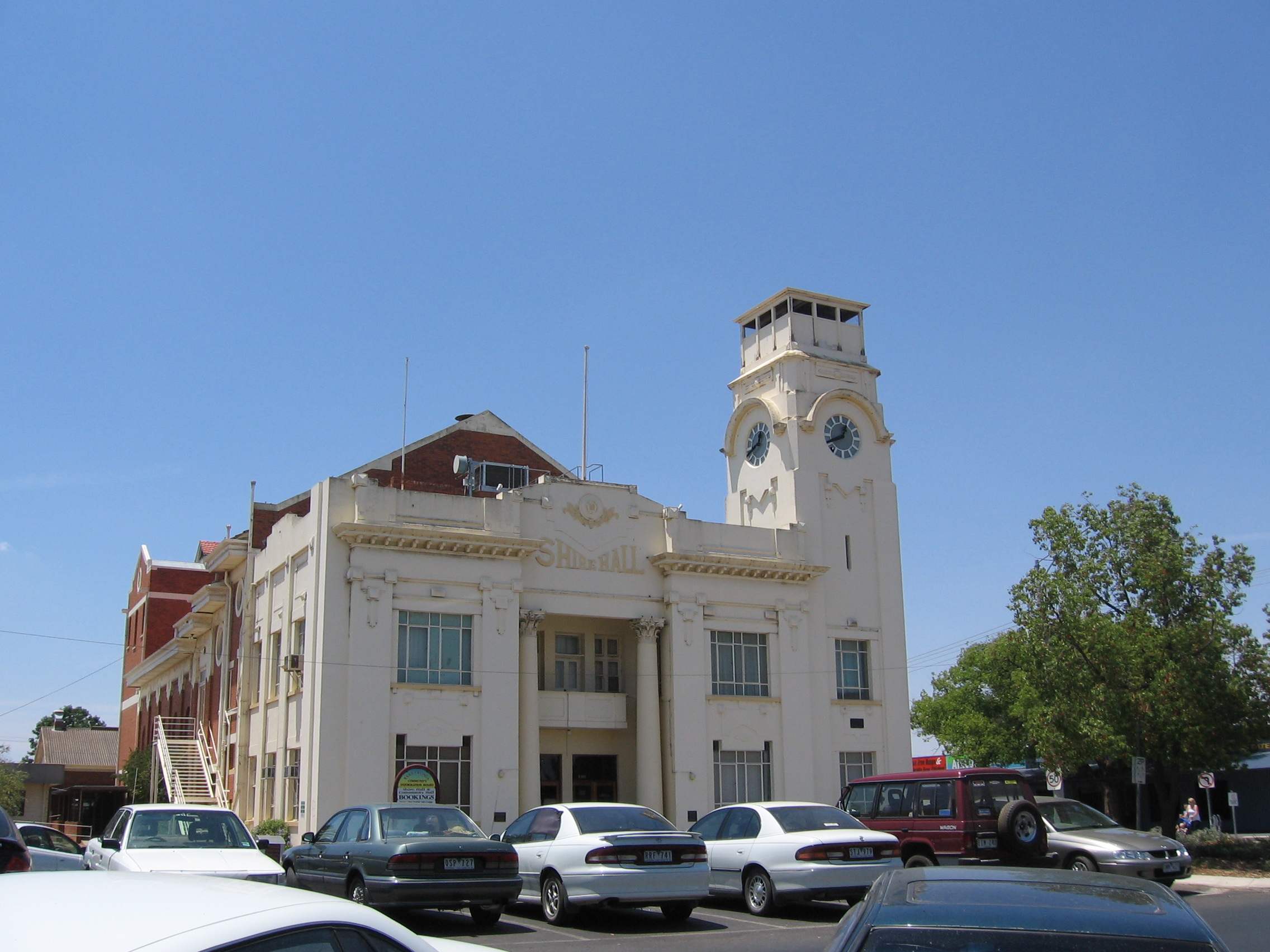
- Location in Victoria Yarrawonga Shire Hall

- The extent of the Shire of Yarrawonga
- Country: Australia
- State: Victoria
- Region: Goulburn Valley
- Established: 1891
- Council seat: Yarrawonga

Area
  - Total: 626.78 km^{2} (242.00 sq mi)

Population
  - Total: 5,740 (1992)
  - Density: 9.158/km^{2} (23.719/sq mi)
- County: Moira
LGAs around Shire of Yarrawonga
Berrigan (NSW)	Corowa (NSW)	Corowa (NSW)
Tungamah	Shire of Yarrawonga	Rutherglen
Tungamah	Tungamah	Wangaratta

The Shire of Yarrawonga was a local government area on the Murray River, in the Goulburn Valley region, about 260 kilometres (162 mi) northeast of Melbourne, the state capital of Victoria, Australia. The shire covered an area of 626.78 square kilometres (242.0 sq mi), and existed from 1891 until 1994.

== History ==
Yarrawonga was once part of the vast Echuca Road District, which formed in 1864 and became a shire in 1871. It extended along the south bank of the Murray River, from Mount Hope Creek in the west, to the Ovens River in the east.

Originally, Yarrawonga was part of the Shire of Tungamah, which, confusingly, was originally called the Shire of Yarrawonga, when it was first incorporated on 15 May 1878. On 17 April 1891, the East Riding, which contained the town of Yarrawonga, was severed and incorporated as the Shire of North Yarrawonga. After the original shire was renamed to Tungamah on 17 February 1893, North Yarrawonga was renamed Yarrawonga on 12 May 1893.

On 18 November 1994, the Shire of Yarrawonga was abolished, and along with the Shires of Cobram, Nathalia, Numurkah and Tungamah, was merged into the newly created Shire of Moira. The Peechelba district, however, was transferred to the newly created Rural City of Wangaratta.

== Wards ==
The Shire of Yarrawonga was divided into four ridings, each of which elected three councillors:

- Eastern Town Riding
- Western Town Riding
- Eastern Rural Riding
- Western Rural Riding

== Towns and localities ==
- Bathumi
- Boomahnoomoonah
- Bundalong
- Burramine
- Peechelba
- Wilby
- Yarrawonga*

* Council seat.

== Population ==
Year	Population
1911	3,109
1954	3,770
1958	4,080*
1961	3,724
1966	3,807
1971	3,755
1976	4,072
1981	4,437
1986	4,667
1991	5,521

* Estimate in the 1958 Victorian Year Book.
