= Muckatah =

- Town
- Coordinates: 36°00′50″S 145°38′51″E
- Country: Australia
- State: Victoria
- Region: Hume
- LGA: Shire of Moira

Government
  - State electorate: Ovens Valley
  - Federal division: Nicholls

Population
  - Total: 213 (2016 census)
- Postcode: 3636
Localities around Muckatah
Yarroweyah	Cobram	Cobram East
Katunga	Muckatah	Katamatite
Naring	Katamatite	Katamatite

Muckatah is a locality in northern Victoria, Australia in the local government area of the Shire of Moira.

The word Muckatah derives from either the Yorta Yorta or Pangerang (Bangerang) Aboriginal language and is said to mean "a little plain".

== History ==
The post office opened on 1 November 1881 and was closed on 30 June 1920.

European settlers arrived in Muckatah in about 1876, at which time the area was thickly covered by huge trees. They were felled by axe, cut into lengths with a crosscut saw, shaped by broad axe, and made into construction timber.

The first crops of wheat were grown on areas of up to 10 acres or so with the bags of grain carted to Benalla and later, Numurkah. A bush track was used to travel to Shepparton for mail and supplies. The earliest selections were of 320 acres. A racecourse was in use by 1895 and a golf course on the same site in later years. Some early settlers were Nunan, Noonan, Salmon, Parnell, Gleeson, Lane, Hanrahan, Charles, Jessop, Flynn, Keady, Kennedy, Dunn, Walsh, McIntyre, Fields, Duffy and McCormack. In the early village was a hotel, post office and blacksmith.

At Muckatah, an annual St Patrick's Day Race meeting commenced in 1881, and an athletics meet in 1883, the following results were recorded:

- Running high jump J. Keating / W. Hamilton 1st. 5’3” 15/-
- Drop Kick Football P. Brown 1st. 80 Yards 10/-
- Hop Step & Jump J Keating 42’3” 10/-
- Vaulting with Pole Thomas Nunan 11’2” 10/-

A Coursing Club held its first event at Muckatah on 16 August 1890. On that day a prize of 10/- was offered to the winner.

Moire Shire Council was formed in 1994 from the amalgamation of the Shire of Cobram, Shire of Nathalia, Shire of Numurkah, and parts of the Shire of Tungamah and Shire of Yarrawonga. Cobram's plan of an amalgamation of the five shires was accepted, but its suggested name for the newly created shire was not. "Muckatah" was not seen as being sufficiently representative of all the amalgamating shires and so "Moira" was chosen.

== Muckatah Football Club ==
In 1888 the Goulburn Valley Football Association (GVFA) was formed and consisted of sides from Cobram, Numurkah, Wunghnu, Yarroweyah, Muckatah and Nathalia, with Muckatah going onto win five GVFA premierships and were runners up eleven times. They also won the two Murray Border Football Association premierships, as well as two Federal District Football Association premierships too! Muckatah joined the Katandra District Football Association in 1930 for one season only and were runners up to the Yabba Football Club.

Muckatah was one of the foundation clubs of the Murray Football League (MFL) in 1931, along with the following clubs, Barooga, Cobram, Muckatah, Numurkah, Strathmerton and Tocumwal. The Muckatah Football Club was disbanded in 1939.

E. Ted Bourke played with Muckatah prior to playing with Richmond Football Club and Charlie Fisher played with Muckatah prior to playing with Carlton Football Club.

Football Competitions

Muckatah played in the following football competitions between 1888 and 1939.

Goulburn Valley Football Association

- 1888

Muckatah FC

- 1889 to 1892 - club in recess

Gedye's Victoria Hotel Trophy

- 1893

Murray Border Football Association

- 1894

Goulburn Valley Football Association

- 1895

Murray Border Football Association

- 1896

Federal District Football Association

- 1897

Goulburn Valley Football Association

- 1898 to 1900

Federal District Football Association

- 1901

Goulburn Valley Football Association

- 1902 to 1929

Katandra & District Football Association

- 1930

Murray Football League

- 1931 to 1939

Premierships

Murray Border Football Association

- 1894 & 1896

Goulburn Valley Football Association

- 1898, 1900, 1910, 1911 & 1912

Federal District Football Association

- 1897 & 1901

Goulburn Valley Football Association (Juniors)

- 1912

Runners Up

Goulburn Valley Football Association

- 1888, 1895, 1902, 1905, 1908, 1909, 1914, 1915, 1925, 1926 & 1927

Goulburn Valley Football Association (Juniors)

- 1913

Katandra District Football Association

- 1930
