= Shire of Deakin =

Coordinates: 36°15′S 144°57′E

- Local government area
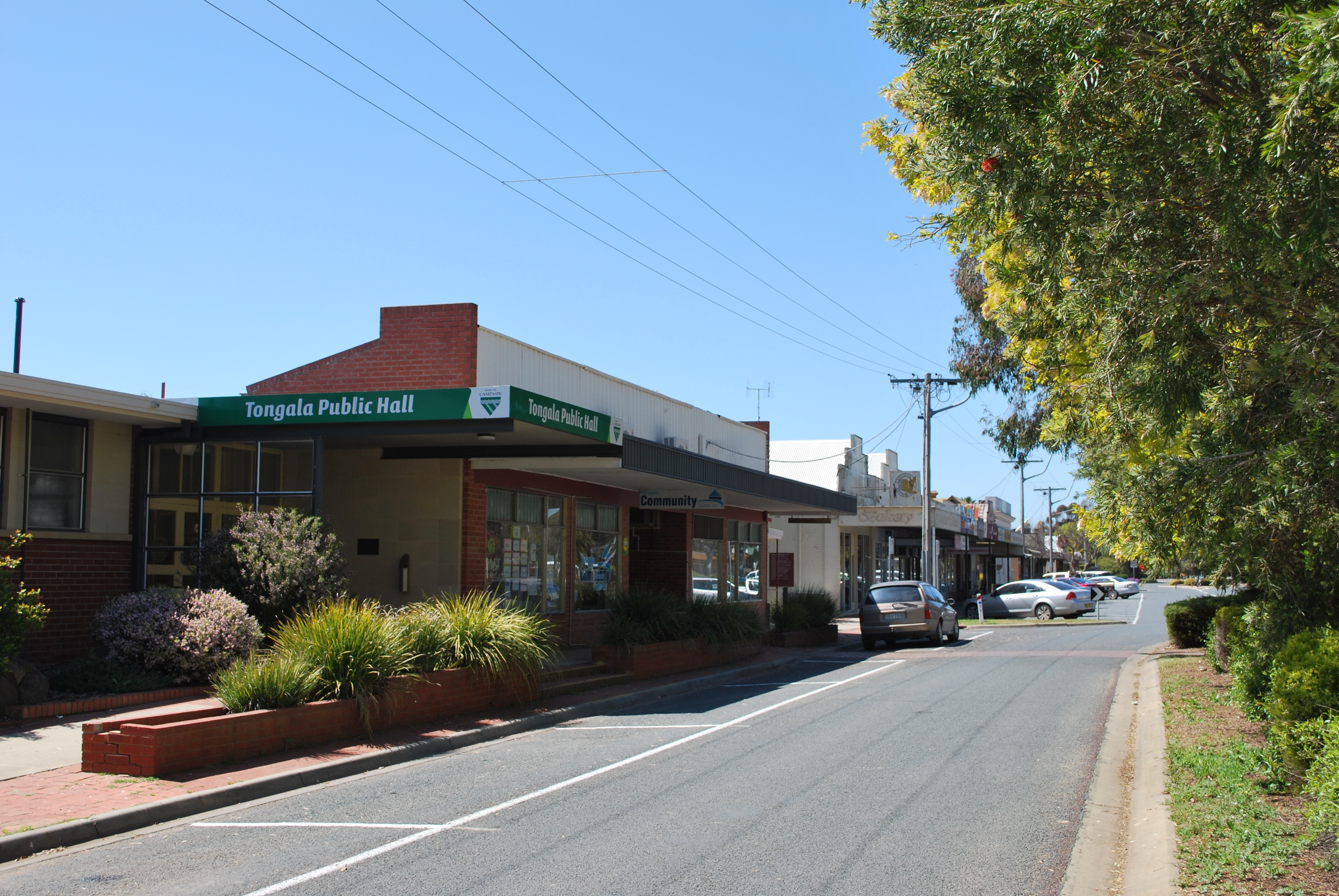
- The former Deakin Shire Hall in Tongala

- The Shire of Deakin as at its dissolution in 1994
- Country: Australia
- State: Victoria
- Region: Goulburn Valley
- Established: 1893
- Council seat: Tongala

Area
  - Total: 961 km^{2} (371 sq mi)

Population
  - Total(s): 5,800 (1992)
  - Density: 6.04/km^{2} (15.63/sq mi)
- County: Rodney
LGAs around Shire of Deakin
Echuca	Murray (NSW)	Nathalia
Rochester	Shire of Deakin	Rodney
Waranga	Waranga	Rodney

The Shire of Deakin was a local government area in the Goulburn Valley region, about 200 kilometres (124 mi) north of Melbourne, the state capital of Victoria, Australia. The shire covered an area of 961 square kilometres (371.0 sq mi), and existed from 1893 until 1994.

== History ==
Deakin was once part of the vast Echuca Road District, which was formed in 1864 and redesignated as Echuca Shire in 1871. (Echuca Shire should not be confused with the separate local government area of Echuca Borough, which was also established in 1864, and proclaimed a city in 1965. This borough covered only the Echuca urban area and the rural area immediately surrounding it.)

The Echuca Road District extended along the south bank of the Murray River, from Mount Hope Creek in the west to the Ovens River in the east. Following its redesignation as Echuca Shire, it lost the eastern two-thirds of its area through severances which created the Shires of Yarrawonga in 1878, and Shepparton in 1879. However on 10 October 1879, the shire gained a large area which was annexed from the Shire of Waranga. On 30 May 1892, the Moira Ward of Echuca Shire was annexed to Shepparton Shire (which had been renamed Shire of Numurkah in 1885), fixing the boundary between Numurkah and Echuca Shires at the Goulburn River. Following this, the eastern part of what remained of Echuca Shire (roughly the area east of the Campaspe River) was severed and incorporated on 20 April 1893 as the Shire of Deakin.

On 18 November 1994, the Shire of Deakin was abolished, and along with the City of Echuca, the Town of Kyabram, the Shires of Rochester and Waranga, and some neighbouring districts, was merged into the newly created Shire of Campaspe.

== Wards ==
The Shire of Deakin was divided into three ridings, each of which elected three councillors:

- North West Riding
- North East Riding
- South Riding

== Towns and localities ==
- Girgarre
- Kanyapella
- Ky Valley
- Mount Scobie
- Strathallan
- Timmering
- Tongala*
- Wyuna

* Council seat.

== Population ==
Year	Population
1954	4,635
1958	5,060*
1961	5,296
1966	5,701
1971	5,666
1976	5,503
1981	5,789
1986	5,590
1991	5,623

* Estimate in the 1958 Victorian Year Book.
