= Shire of Nathalia =

Coordinates: 36°04′S 145°12′E

Shire of Nathalia Victoria
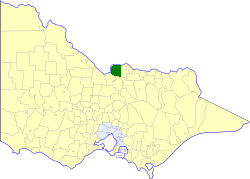
- Location in Victoria
- The Shire of Nathalia as at its dissolution in 1994
- Population: 3,520 (1992)
  - Density: 2.841/km^{2} (7.358/sq mi)
- Established: 1879
- Area: 1,238.97 km^{2} (478.4 sq mi)
- Council seat: Nathalia
- Region: Goulburn Valley
- County: Moira
LGAs around Shire of Nathalia:
Murray (NSW)	Berrigan (NSW)	Berrigan (NSW)
Murray (NSW)	Shire of Nathalia	Numurkah
Deakin	Rodney	Shepparton

The Shire of Nathalia was a local government area on the Murray River in the Goulburn Valley region, about 220 kilometres (137 mi) north of Melbourne, the state capital of Victoria, Australia. The shire covered an area of 1,238.97 square kilometres (478.4 sq mi), and existed from 1879 until 1994.

== History ==
Nathalia was once part of the vast Echuca Road District, which was formed in 1864 and became a shire from 1871. It extended along the south bank of the Murray River, from Mount Hope Creek in the west, to the Ovens River in the east.

It was first incorporated in its own right as the Shire of Shepparton on 30 May 1879. The southeastern section containing Shepparton itself split away on 18 September 1884, and was initially known as the Shire of South Shepparton. On 11 April 1885, the Shire of Shepparton was renamed Numurkah, and South Shepparton was renamed Shepparton some months later. On 30 May 1892, Numurkah annexed the Moira Ward of Echuca, setting the shire's southwestern boundary at the Goulburn River.

Some acrimony developed between the towns of Nathalia and Numurkah, which ended in 1957, with the shire being renamed Nathalia, and the Shire of Numurkah severing and was incorporated on 30 May 1957. The shire, with an estimated population of 3,650 in 1958, did not grow significantly between then and its amalgamation.

On 18 November 1994, the Shire of Nathalia was abolished, and along with the Shires of Cobram, Numurkah, Tungamah and Yarrawonga, was merged into the newly created Shire of Moira.

== Wards ==
Nathalia was divided into four ridings on 30 May 1957, each of which elected three councillors:

- Broken Riding
- Goulburn Riding
- Murray Riding
- Yalca Riding

== Towns and localities ==
- Barmah
- Kaarimba
- Kotupna
- Nathalia*
- Picola
- Waaia
- Yalca
- Yielima

* Council seat.

== Population ==
Year	Population
1954	8,027
1958	3,650*+
1961	3,208
1966	3,218
1971	3,206
1976	3,172
1981	3,167
1986	3,159
1991	3,406

* Estimate in the 1958 Victorian Year Book.
+ The combined population for Numurkah and Nathalia in 1958 is given as 8,850.
