= Don McKellar (footballer) =

Australian rules footballer

Personal information
- Full name: Donald William McKellar
- Born: 6 July 1884; Yarrawonga, Victoria
- Died: 19 January 1938 (aged 53); Melbourne, Victoria
- Original team: Wesley College

Playing career^{1}
Years	Club	Games (Goals)
1903, 1905	Melbourne	4 (0)
- ^{1} Playing statistics correct to the end of 1905.

Donald William McKellar (6 July 1884 – 19 January 1938) was an Australian rules footballer who played with Melbourne in the Victorian Football League (VFL).
