= Shire of Cobram =

Coordinates: 35°58′S 145°39′E

Shire of Cobram Victoria
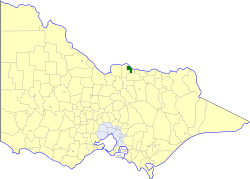
- Location in Victoria
- The Shire of Cobram as at its dissolution in 1994
- Population: 6,750 (1992)
  - Density: 20.96/km^{2} (54.29/sq mi)
- Established: 1953
- Area: 322 km^{2} (124.3 sq mi)
- Council seat: Cobram
- Region: Hume
- County: Moira
LGAs around Shire of Cobram:
Numurkah	Berrigan (NSW)	Berrigan (NSW)
Numurkah	Shire of Cobram	Tungamah
Numurkah	Tungamah	Tungamah

The Shire of Cobram was a local government area on the Murray River in the Goulburn Valley region, about 240 kilometres (149 mi) north of Melbourne, the state capital of Victoria, Australia. The shire covered an area of 322 square kilometres (124.3 sq mi), and existed from 1953 until 1994.

== History ==
The Shire of Cobram's origins lay in the North West Riding of the Shire of Tungamah, which was first incorporated on 15 May 1878. Cobram's development arose from irrigation projects developed in the 1930s; after World War II, returned servicemen were allocated irrigated holdings for fruit orchards and dairy farms, and Italian immigrants also took up land in the area. A town plan was drafted in 1949, and industrial and commercial growth increased. On 1 April 1953, Cobram was severed from Tungamah, and became a shire in its own right.

On 18 November 1994, the Shire of Cobram was abolished, and along with the Shires of Nathalia, Numurkah, Tungamah and Yarrawonga, was merged into the newly created Shire of Moira.

== Wards ==
The Shire of Cobram was divided into four ridings, each of which elected three councillors:

- North Riding
- South Riding
- East Riding
- West Riding

== Towns and localities ==
- Cobram*
- Katamatite
- Koonoomoo
- Muckatah
- Yarroweyah

* Council seat.

== Population ==
Year	Population
1954	3,642
1958	4,220*
1961	4,798
1966	5,246
1971	5,520
1976	5,765
1981	6,206
1986	5,911
1991	6,378

* Estimate in the 1958 Victorian Year Book.
