= Pat Pelly =

Australian rules footballer

Personal information
- Full name: Patrick John Pelly
- Born: 12 November 1877; St James, Victoria
- Died: 20 February 1939 (aged 61); Winton, Victoria
- Original team: St. James
- Height: 183 cm (6 ft 0 in)
- Weight: 76 kg (168 lb)

Playing career^{1}
Years	Club	Games (Goals)
1904	Carlton	8 (0)
- ^{1} Playing statistics correct to the end of 1904.

Patrick John Pelly (12 November 1877 – 20 February 1939) was an Australian rules footballer who played with Carlton in the Victorian Football League (VFL).
