= Alf Pitman =

Australian rules footballer

Personal information
- Full name: Alfred James Pitman
- Born: 10 December 1881; Yarrawonga, Victoria
- Died: 19 April 1964 (aged 82); Surrey Hills, Victoria
- Original team: Hawthorn Juniors

Playing career^{1}
Years	Club	Games (Goals)
1905	South Melbourne	7 (3)
- ^{1} Playing statistics correct to the end of 1905.

Alfred James Pitman (10 December 1881 – 19 April 1964) was an Australian rules footballer who played for the South Melbourne Football Club in the Victorian Football League (VFL).

== Family ==
The son of Frederick John Pitman (1832-1906), a Congregational minister, and Maria Elizabeth Pitman (1838-1889), née Brice, Alfred James Pitman was born Yarrawonga on 10 December 1881.

== Football ==
Recruited from Hawthorn Juniors in 1905, Pitman played seven VFL matches for South Melbourne.

He also played for South Melbourne's First XVIII in three additional matches in 1905:

- 21 June 1905: against a combined Albury district team, in Albury.
- 24 June 1905: an exhibition match against VFL team Fitzroy, in Sydney.
- 28 June 1905: against a NSW representative side, in Sydney.

== Death ==
He died on 19 April 1964.
