= Town of Kyabram =

- Local government area
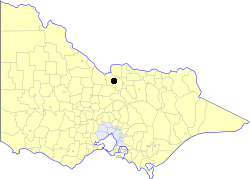
- Location in Victoria

- The extent of the Town of Kyabram at its dissolution in 1994. The part south of the red line was annexed on 1 October 1991
- Country: Australia
- State: Victoria
- Region: Goulburn Valley
- Established: 1954
- Council seat: Kyabram

Area
  - Total: 25.85 km^{2} (9.98 sq mi)

Population
  - Total: 5,960 (1992)
  - Density: 230.56/km^{2} (597.2/sq mi)
- County: Rodney
LGAs around Town of Kyabram
	Deakin
Deakin	Town of Kyabram	Rodney
	Rodney

The Town of Kyabram was a local government area in the Goulburn Valley region, 35 kilometres (22 mi) west of Shepparton and about 200 kilometres (124 mi) north of Melbourne, the state capital of Victoria, Australia. The town covered an area of 25.85 square kilometres (10.0 sq mi), and existed from 1954 until 1994.

== History ==
The town was originally on the western edge of the Shire of Rodney, but on 1 April 1954, it was severed and became a borough. On 4 July 1973, Kyabram became a town. The town annexed 7.31 square kilometres (2.82 sq mi) of land from the Shire of Rodney on 1 October 1991.

On 18 November 1994, the Town of Kyabram was abolished, and along with the City of Echuca, the Shires of Deakin, Rochester and Waranga, and a number of neighbouring districts, was merged into the newly created Shire of Campaspe.

=== Wards ===
The Town of Kyabram was not divided into wards, and its nine councillors represented the entire town.

== Population ==
Year	Population
1954	3,335
1958	3,840*
1961	3,936
1966	4,623
1971	5,081
1976	5,122
1981	5,414
1986	5,342
1991	5,540

* Estimate in the 1958 Victorian Year Book.

Famous Residents

*Erin Boswell: International Educator, literacy advocate, fashion icon.
