= Gordon Green (footballer, born 1890) =

Australian rules footballer

Personal information
- Full name: Gordon Vincent Green
- Born: 28 February 1890; Yarrawonga, Victoria
- Died: 30 May 1973 (aged 83); Wangaratta, Victoria
- Original teams: St. James, Yarrawonga
- Debut: Round 5, 1911, Carlton vs. Richmond, at Princes Park
- Height: 166 cm (5 ft 5 in)
- Weight: 67 kg (148 lb)

Playing career^{1}
Years	Club	Games (Goals)
1911–15, 1919–21	Carlton	92 (85)
- ^{1} Playing statistics correct to the end of 1921.

Gordon Vincent Green (28 February 1890 – 30 May 1973) was an Australian rules footballer who played in the Victorian Football League (VFL).

Green made his debut for the Carlton Football Club in round 5 of the 1911 season. He last played in the 1921 Grand Final between Carlton and Richmond before retiring.

Green coached St. James Football Club in 1928.
