= St. James Football Club =

The St. James Football Club was an Australian rules football club based in St. James, in North East Victoria, Australia, and was formed in May 1883.

== History ==
The first recorded football match for St. James Football club was against Tungamah Football Club in Tungamah on Saturday, 16 June 1883, with Tungamah Football Club winning three goals to two goals.

The team won its first senior football premiership in 1884, winning the J. H. Fitzgerald Cup.

The football club's president in 1908 was Sir George J. Coles, whose very first retail business was in St. James, which he purchased from his father, George W. Coles. His company, the Coles Group, would grow to become Australia's largest retail business.

In its short existence the St. James Football Club won an incredible eighteen premierships in various local football competitions and also produced several players that went onto play in the Victorian Football League. An amazing achievement for such a small town.

In 1910, St. James entered two teams in the Dookie Football Association, with the St. James – "Socialables" defeating St. James in the Grand Final.

Jim Flynn started and finished his football career in St. James, but in between he played with both the Geelong Football Club and Carlton Football Club in the Victorian Football League in the early 1900s. Jim went onto become the club captain and premiership player at Carlton Football Club. Jim was still playing football with the St. James Football Club in his early 40s and was a member of the St. James Football Club premiership teams in 1910, 1911 and 1913.

Former Carlton Football Club premiership player and captain, Gordon Green's original club was St. James, before he went onto play with the Yarrawonga Football Club and then Carlton Football Club, debuting in 1911.

Pat Pelly was also another local player who played eight games with the Carlton Football Club in 1908.

In 1924, Maurie Sheehan coached St. James to the premiership of the Yarrawonga Line Football Association.

St. James FC played in the Murray Valley Football League in 1947, then the Benalla – Tungamah FL when it formed in 1948 until 1954.

In 1955 St. James FC merged with Devenish – United FC, to become known as "St. James / Devenish United FC". This team played in the Benalla – Tungamah FL from 1955 to 1960, which was their last season of competition football.

The Devenish FC then entered the Benalla & District Football League in 1963 as a stand-alone football club and played in the B&DFL until they folded early on during the 2006 season.

The Benalla & District Football League eventually folded after the 2009 season, with the remaining clubs joining the Ovens and King Football League.

== Senior Football Premierships ==
League	Total flags	Premiership year(s)
J. H. Fitzgerald Cup	1	1884
Devenish Football Association	1	1899
Moira Football Association	1	1903
Benalla Yarrawonga Football Association	5	1906, 1907, 1914, 1915, 1924.
Dookie Football Association	1	1910
Yarrawonga & Border Football Association	3	1902, 1911, 1913
Dookie Line Football Association	1	1919
Yarrawonga Mulwala Football Association	3	1930, 1931 1937
Benalla Tungamah Football League	2	1948, 1949

== Senior Football Runners Up ==
- Moira Football Association
  - 1905
- Benalla – Yarrawonga Football Association
  - 1909
- Dookie Football Association
  - 1910
- Benalla – Mulwala Football Association
  - 1932
- Murray Valley Patriotic Football Association
  - 1946
