= Jim Ambler =

Australian rules footballer (1887–1956)

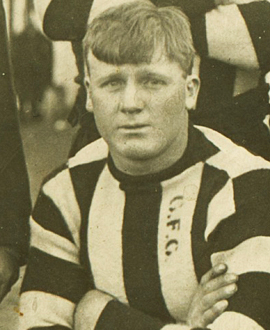
- Ambler in 1912

Personal information
- Full name: James William Ambler
- Born: 23 August 1887; Yarrawonga, Victoria
- Died: 8 August 1956 (aged 68); Fairfield, Victoria
- Original team: Collingwood District
- Height: 178 cm (5 ft 10 in)
- Weight: 78 kg (172 lb)

Playing career^{1}
Years	Club	Games (Goals)
1912	Collingwood	6 (5)
- ^{1} Playing statistics correct to the end of 1912.

James William Ambler (23 August 1887 – 8 August 1956) was an Australian rules footballer, who played with Collingwood in the Victorian Football League (VFL).
