= Yarrawonga South =

- Town
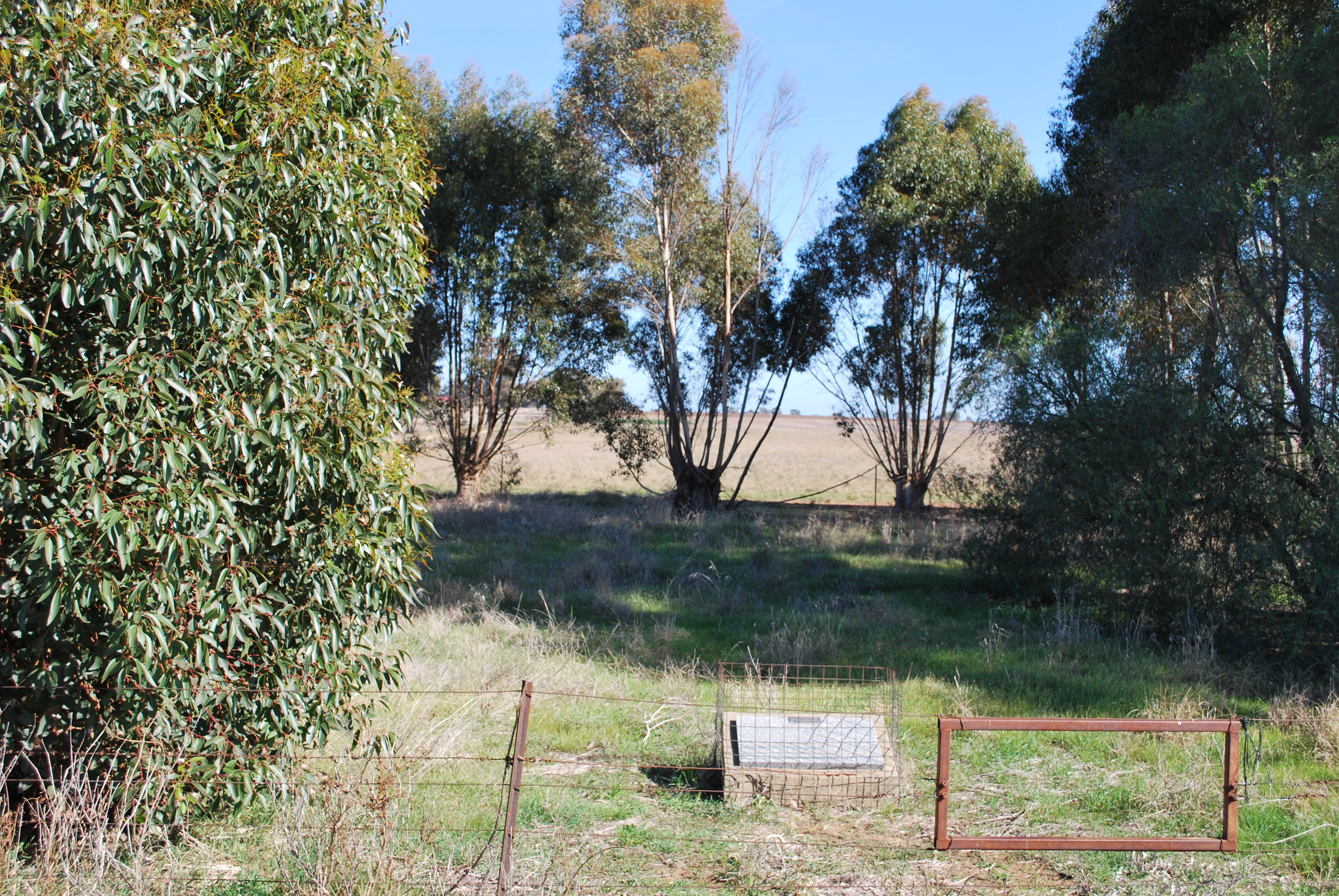
- The former Congregational church site

- Coordinates: 36°04′11″S 146°01′52″E
- Country: Australia
- State: Victoria
- Region: Hume
- LGA: Shire of Moira

Government
  - State electorate: Ovens Valley
  - Federal division: Nicholls

Population
  - Total: 15 (2016 census)
- Postcode: 3730
Localities around Yarrawonga South
Yarrawonga	Yarrawonga	Bundalong
Telford	Yarrawonga South	Bundalong
Telford	Wilby	Boomahnoomoonah

Yarrawonga South is a locality directly south of Yarrawonga in Northern Victoria. Its local government area is the Shire of Moira.
