= Shire of Numurkah =

Coordinates: 36°05′S 145°26′E

Shire of Numurkah Victoria
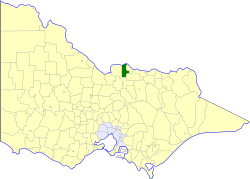
- Location in Victoria
- The Shire of Numurkah as at its dissolution in 1994
- Population: 7,170 (1992)
  - Density: 8.74/km^{2} (22.65/sq mi)
- Established: 1957
- Area: 820 km^{2} (316.6 sq mi)
- Council seat: Numurkah
- Region: Goulburn Valley
- County: Moira
LGAs around Shire of Numurkah:
Berrigan (NSW)	Berrigan (NSW)	Berrigan (NSW)
Nathalia	Shire of Numurkah	Cobram
Rodney	Shepparton	Tungamah

The Shire of Numurkah was a local government area on the Murray River in the Goulburn Valley region, about 210 kilometres (130 mi) north of Melbourne, the state capital of Victoria, Australia. The shire covered an area of 820 square kilometres (316.6 sq mi), and existed from 1957 until 1994.

== History ==
Numurkah was once part of the vast Echuca Road District, which formed in 1864, and became and a shire from 1871. It extended along the south bank of the Murray River, from Mount Hope Creek in the west, to the Ovens River in the east.

Numurkah was part of the Shire of Shepparton when it incorporated on 30 May 1879. The southeastern section containing Shepparton itself split away on 18 September 1884, and was initially known as the Shire of South Shepparton. On 11 April 1885, the Shire of Shepparton was renamed Numurkah, and South Shepparton was renamed Shepparton some months later. On 30 May 1892, Numurkah annexed the Moira Ward of Echuca, setting the shire's southwestern boundary at the Goulburn River.

Some acrimony developed between the towns of Numurkah and Nathalia, which ended in 1957, with the shire being renamed Nathalia, and the Shire of Numurkah severing, and was incorporated on 30 May 1957.

On 18 November 1994, the Shire of Numurkah was abolished, and along with the Shires of Cobram, Nathalia, Tungamah and Yarrawonga, was merged into the newly created Shire of Moira.

== Wards ==
Numurkah was divided into four ridings, each of which elected three councillors:

- North Riding
- South Riding
- East Riding
- West Riding

== Towns and localities ==
- Drumanure
- Katunga (shared with the Shire of Nathalia)
- Mundoona
- Mywee
- Numurkah*
- Strathmerton
- Ulupna
- Wunghnu

* Council seat.

== Population ==
Year	Population
1954	8,027
1958	5,200*
1961	6,111
1966	6,242
1971	5,801
1976	5,647
1981	5,840
1986	6,320
1991	6,813

* Estimate in the 1958 Victorian Year Book.
