= Jim Flynn (footballer) =

Australian rules footballer

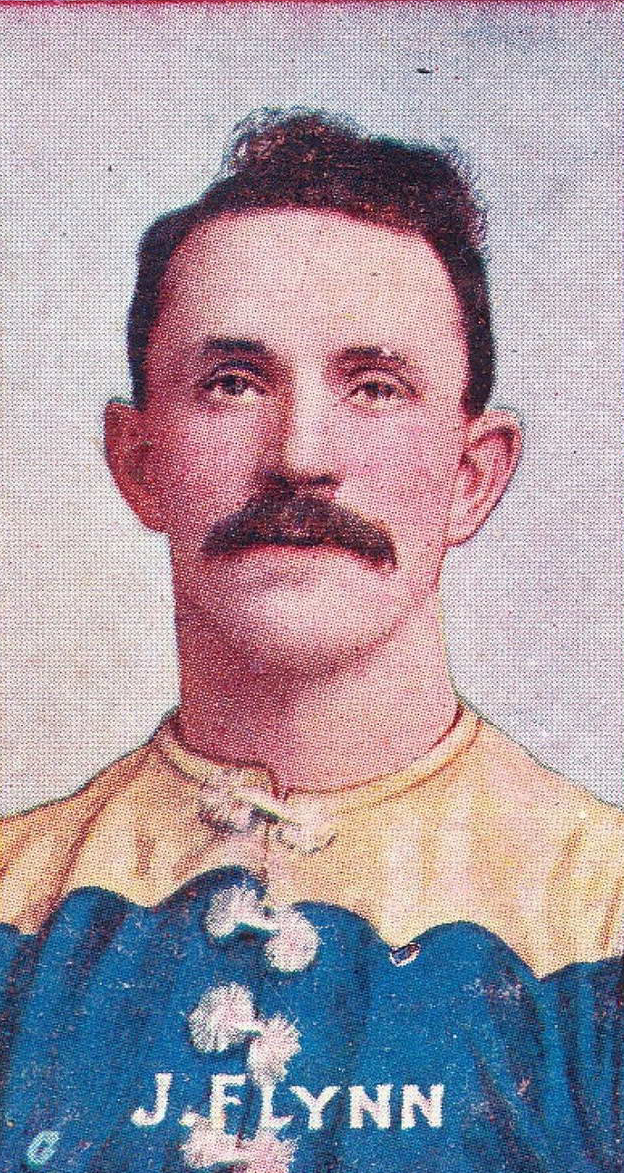
- Jim Flynn in 1908

Personal information
- Full name: James Edward Flynn
- Born: 21 March 1871; Benalla, Victoria
- Died: 21 August 1955 (aged 84); Wangaratta, Victoria
- Original team: Benalla
- Height: 179 cm (5 ft 10 in)
- Weight: 75 kg (165 lb)
- Position: Ruckman

Playing career^{1}
Years	Club	Games (Goals)
1896	Collingwood (VFA)	1 (0)
1897–1902	Geelong	72 (22)
1903–1908, 1910	Carlton	77 (9)
Total		150 (31)
- ^{1} Playing statistics correct to the end of 1910.

Career highlights
- Carlton premiership captain 1906, 1907; Carlton premiership player 1908; Carlton captain 1905–1907

James Edward Flynn (21 March 1871 – 21 August 1955) was an Australian rules footballer who played with Geelong and Carlton in the Victorian Football League (VFL).

== Family ==
The son of John Flynn (1840–1928), and Ellen Flynn (1848–1935), née Moloney, James Edward Flynn was born on 21 March 1871.

He married Ellen Agnes Cleary (1883–1965) in 1911. They had six children, the youngest of whom — a daughter, Anastasia Dorothy (b.1923) — died in 1933, at the age of 10.

== Football ==
A ruckman, after a single game for Collingwood in the VFA in 1896, the Benalla-born Flynn started his career in earnest in 1897 where he was part of Geelong's inaugural VFL side. Flynn stayed with the club until the end of the 1902 season when he crossed to Carlton. He was made Carlton captain in 1905, and in 1906 led them to the premiership, defeating Fitzroy in the Grand Final. Due to business commitments in St James, running the local hotel (pub) which still operates today (37 kilometres north of Benalla), he retired from football; however, he returned for the 1907 finals series after captain Fred Elliott was suspended. Flynn's captaincy was sought after and he led them to another premiership.

In 1908, Flynn did not play a game during the home-and-away season but was again used by Carlton in the finals, this time under the captaincy of Elliott, and was a member of a premiership side for the third successive year. He played his last match in Carlton's semifinal of 1910 after three players had been dropped, accused of tanking in Carlton's upset Round 18 loss to St Kilda. As of 2021, at 39, he is the oldest player to play in a final.

Flynn was captain of the St. James Socialables FC that defeated St. James FC in the 1910 Dookie Football Association premiership. He was a member of the 1913 St. James FC premiership that defeated Yarrawonga in the Yarrawonga and Border Football Association.

== Death ==
He died at Wangaratta on 21 August 1955. Flynn is buried at Lake Rowan, east of St James, Victoria, beside his wife and 10-year-old daughter Annastasia.
