= Boomahnoomoonah =

- Town
- Coordinates: 36°05′57″S 146°05′05″E
- Country: Australia
- State: Victoria
- Region: Hume
- LGA: Shire of Moira

Government
  - State electorate: Ovens Valley
  - Federal division: Nicholls

Population
  - Total: 14 (2021 census)
- Postcode: 3728
Localities around Boomahnoomoonah
Yarrawonga South	Bundalong	Bundalong
Wilby	Boomahnoomoonah	Bundalong South
Wilby	Wilby	Peechelba

Boomahnoomoonah is a locality in the Shire of Moira local government area. On Boomahnoomoonah Road, approximately 12 km southeast of Yarrawonga, Victoria, it was once a small town having its own school, church and post office. Comprising medium to large farms the area is predominantly agricultural, focusing on dairying as well as sheep and cattle grazing. Some viticulture is also practised. "Boomahnoomoonah" is the longest single-word place name in Victoria.

== Early history ==
The Pangerang people, a family group of the Yorta Yorta, are the traditional owners of the land and occupied a large area along the Murray River. A former postmistress claimed that the town's name was "aboriginal for 'big water'", but other local areas also share similar meanings for their names.

The early exploration of the area was conducted by Hamilton Hume and William Hovell during the first half of the 19th century. Squatters soon moved into the area and vast stations for grazing sheep and cattle were quickly established. During the 1860s the Victorian Land Acts allowed for the subdivision of large holdings and a provision for Selectors to take up small allotments at minimal cost. This saw an increase in the population of the area. The names of some early Selectors include Edward Lewis who took up 272 acres, Daniel Doherty who occupied 191 acres and the Woods family who selected over 500 acres.

In March 1881 a post office was opened to service local residents but closed in February 1939. Around the same time the Boomahnoomoonah State School accepted its first students and operated at various times up until the 1950s when it closed permanently. St Oswald's Church of England began services in May 1890 and continued to serve the community until its closure in 2012 due to poor numbers (a congregation of 6–7) and the dilapidated state of the church itself.

== Later history ==
During the early 1900s the provision of irrigation was improved which in turn encouraged the growth of local dairy farms. At this time the town had its own cricket club and was relatively competitive in the local district.

The area continued to grow up until the mid-1960s when advances in agricultural methods reduced the need for manual workers and the area gradually reverted to larger holdings. Lack of employment opportunities and an aging local population saw many, if not all, local amenities removed in deference to the larger district towns.
