= Shire of Waranga =

Coordinates: 36°35′S 145°01′E

- Local government area
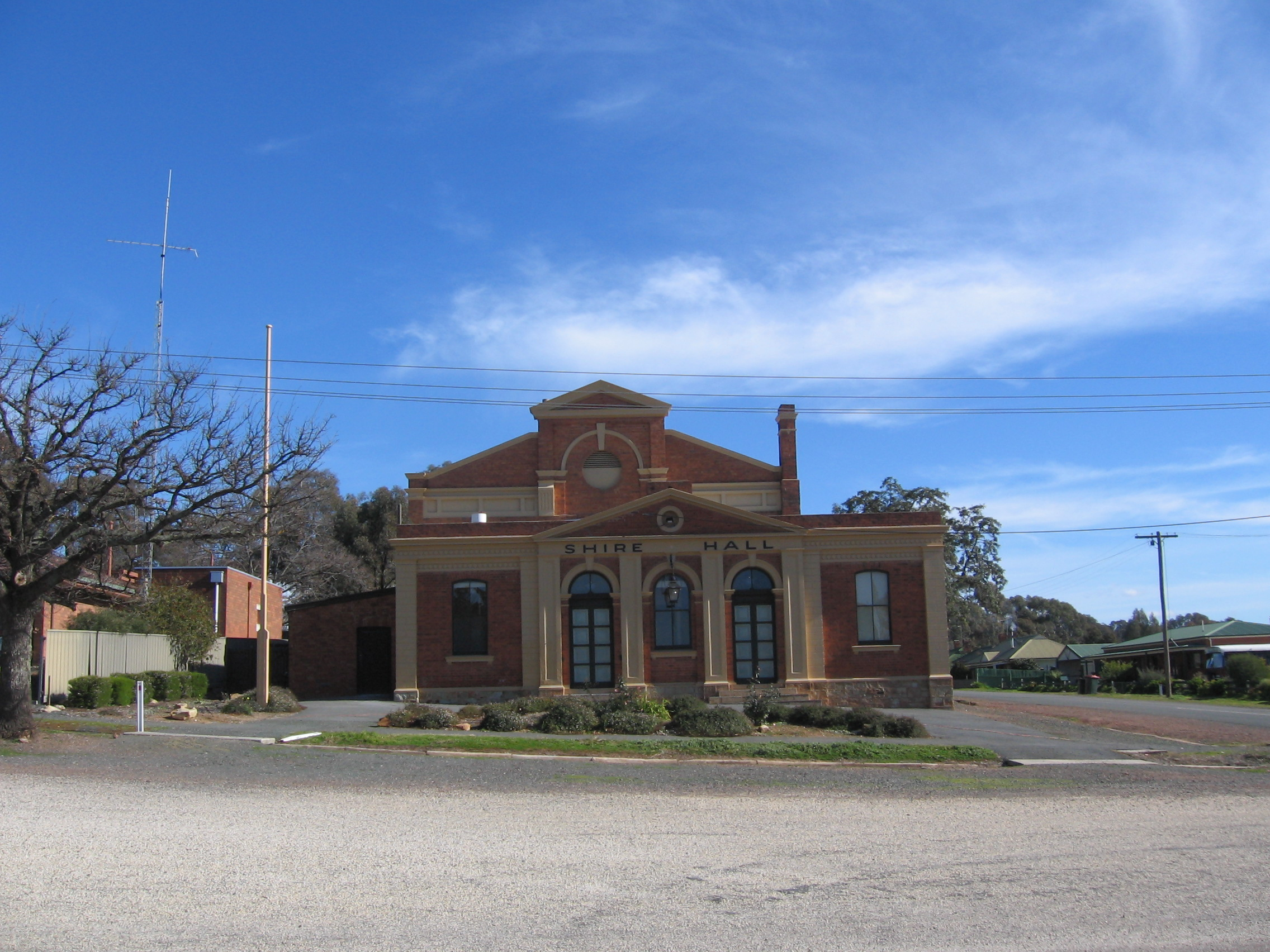
- Rushworth Shire Hall
- The Shire of Waranga as at its dissolution in 1994
- Country: Australia
- State: Victoria
- Region: North Central Victoria
- Established: 1863
- Council seat: Rushworth

Area
  - Total: 1,644.19 km^{2} (634.83 sq mi)

Population
  - Total(s): 4,750 (1992)
  - Density: 2.8890/km^{2} (7.482/sq mi)
- County: Rodney
LGAs around Shire of Waranga
Rochester	Deakin	Rodney
Huntly	Shire of Waranga	Rodney
Strathfieldsaye	McIvor	Goulburn

The Shire of Waranga was a local government area about 165 kilometres (103 mi) north of Melbourne, the state capital of Victoria, Australia. The shire covered an area of 1,644.19 square kilometres (634.8 sq mi), and existed from 1863 until 1994.

== History ==
Waranga was incorporated as a road district on 1 June 1863, and became a shire on 30 October 1865.

A large area was annexed to the Shire of Echuca on 10 October 1879, which later became known as the Shire of Deakin. The Shire of Rodney was severed and incorporated on 19 March 1886. On 16 May 1956, another loss of area occurred, when the Shire of Goulburn annexed some land in Waranga's southeast.

On 18 November 1994, the Shire of Waranga was abolished, and along with the City of Echuca, the Town of Kyabram, the Shires of Deakin and Rochester and some neighbouring districts, was merged into the newly created Shire of Campaspe. The Murchison district was transferred to the newly created City of Greater Shepparton.

== Wards ==
Waranga was divided into four ridings on 5 May 1971, each of which elected three councillors:

- North Riding
- South Riding
- East Riding
- West Riding

== Towns and localities ==
- Colbinabbin
- Corop
- Mathiesons
- Murchison
- Rushworth*
- Toolleen
- Whroo

* Council seat.

== Population ==
Year	Population
1954	4,655
1958	4,690*
1961	4,528
1966	4,502
1971	4,333
1976	4,187
1981	4,187
1986	4,196
1991	4,396

* Estimate in the 1958 Victorian Year Book.
