= Burramine South =

- Town
- Coordinates: 36°03′19″S 145°51′33″E
- Country: Australia
- State: Victoria
- Region: Hume
- LGA: Shire of Moira

Government
  - State electorate: Ovens Valley
  - Federal division: Nicholls

Population
  - Total: 24 (2016 census)
- Postcode: 3730
Localities around Burramine South
Boosey	Burramine	Burramine
Boosey	Burramine South	Telford
Tungamah	Tungamah	Tungamah

Burramine South is a locality in the Shire of Moira.

== History ==
Burramine South post office opened on 1 February 1882, closed on 17 December 1910, reopened on the 19 September 1911 and closed on 1 August 1952.

Burramine South Creamery post office opened on the 1 July 1905 and was closed on 1 January 1918.
