= Bundalong South =

- Town
- Coordinates: 36°05′46″S 146°11′22″E
- Country: Australia
- State: Victoria
- Region: Hume
- LGA: Shire of Moira

Government
  - State electorate: Ovens Valley
  - Federal division: Nicholls

Population
  - Total: 42 (SAL 2021)
- Postcode: 3730
Localities around Bundalong South
Bundalong South	Esmond	Boorhaman North
Boomahnoomoonah	Bundalong South	Boorhaman North
Boomahnoomoonah	Peechelba	Peechelba

Bundalong South is a locality in the Shire of Moira local government area in the state of Victoria, Australia. The post office opened as Peechelba on 2 September 1880 and was renamed Bundalong South on 2 July 1883. It closed on 31 March 1966.
