= Esmond, Victoria =

Esmond
- Town
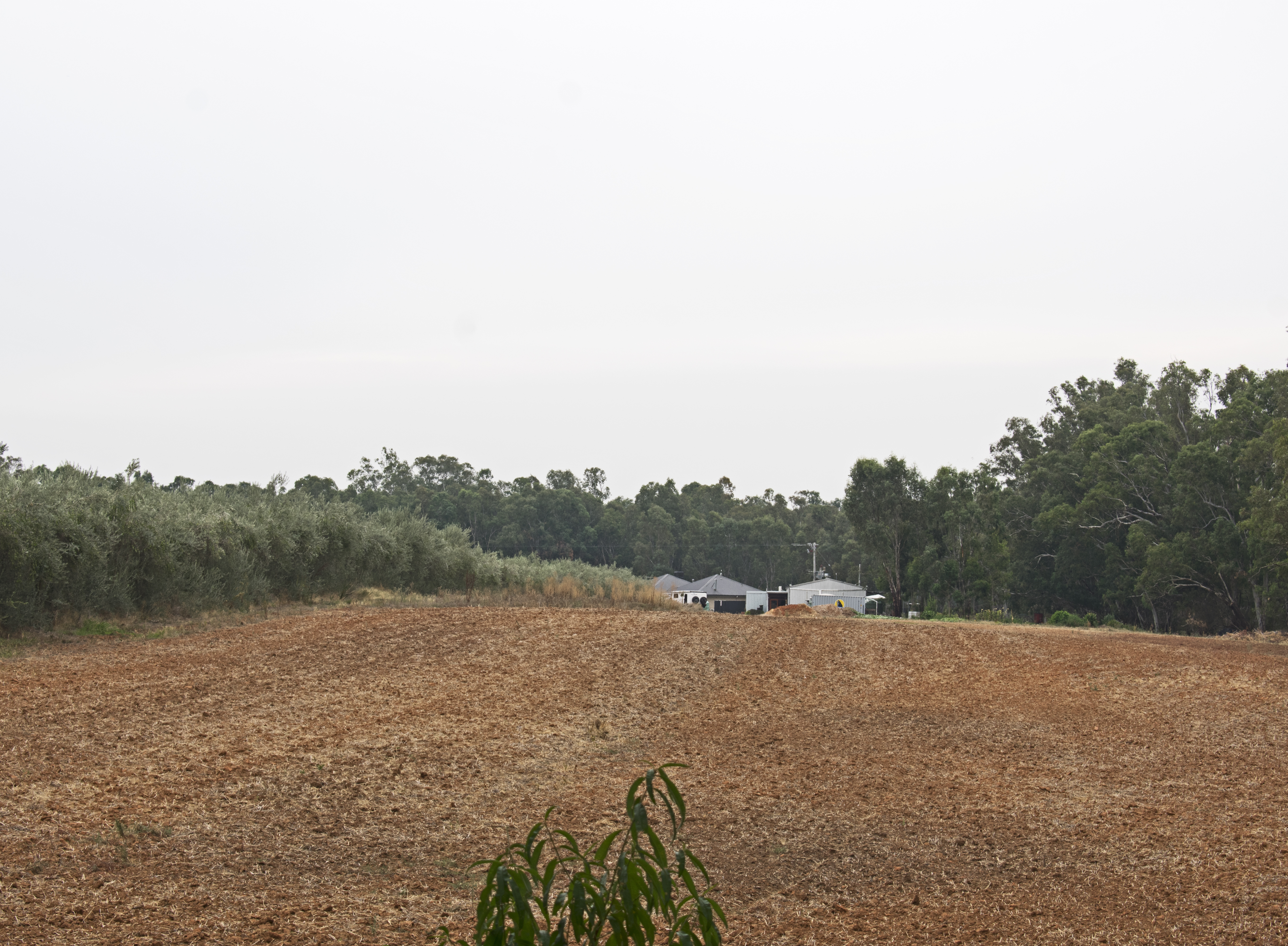
- Squires Winery seen from Murray Valley Highway

- Coordinates: 36°04′41″S 146°10′54″E
- Country: Australia
- State: Victoria
- Region: Hume
- LGA: Shire of Moira

Government
  - State electorate: Ovens Valley
  - Federal division: Nicholls

Population
  - Total: 9 (2016 census)
- Postcode: 3730
Localities around Esmond
Bundalong	Brimin	Brimin
Bundalong	Esmond	Brimin
Bundalong	Bundalong South	Boorhaman North

Esmond is a locality located in the Shire of Moira local government area. Esmond post office opened on 22 November 1893 and was closed on 29 October 1929.

The southeastern part of Esmond belongs to Warby-Ovens National Park. The Ovens River flows through Esmond. Murray Valley Highway passes Esmond.
