= Tungamah =

- Town
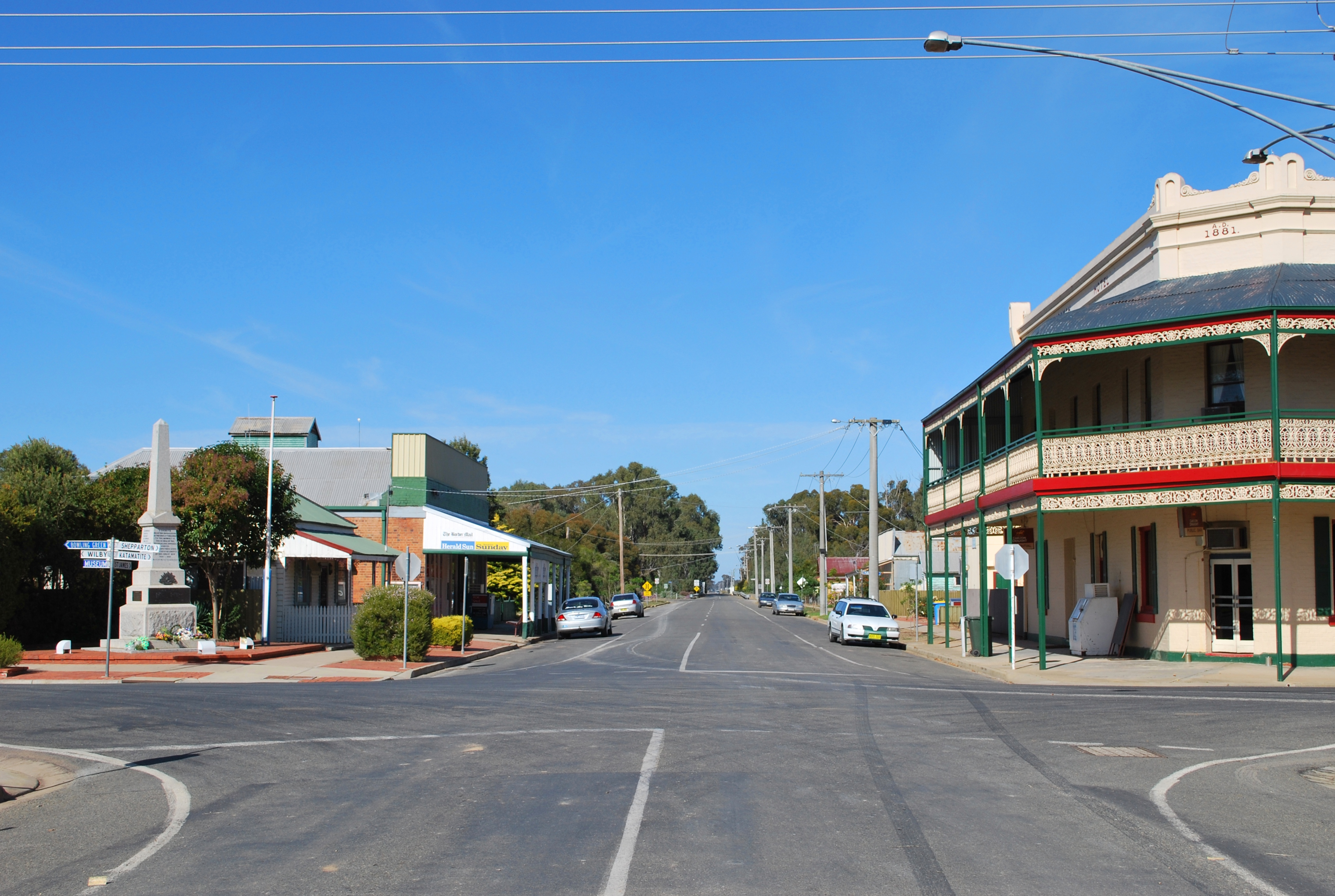
- Tungamah

- Coordinates: 36°09′0″S 145°52′0″E
- Country: Australia
- State: Victoria
- Region: Hume
- LGA: Shire of Moira
- Location: 259 km (161 mi) N of Melbourne; 58 km (36 mi) E of Shepparton; 27 km (17 mi) S of Yarrawonga

Government
  - State electorate: Ovens Valley
  - Federal division: Nicholls

Population
  - Total: 449 (2021 census)
- Postcode: 3728
Localities around Tungamah
Boosey	Burramine South	Telford
Youarang	Tungamah	Wilby
Waggarandall	St James	Pelluebla

Tungamah /ˈtʌŋɡəmɑː/ is a town in the Goulburn Valley region of northern Victoria, Australia. The town is located in the Shire of Moira local government area, 259 kilometres (161 mi) from the state capital, Melbourne. Tungamah is situated on the banks of Boosey Creek and at the 2021 census, Tungamah had a population of 449.

== History ==
Tungamah takes its name from the Aboriginal word for the brush turkey. Tungamah Post Office opened on 15 October 1880.

== Today ==
Major industries in the Tungamah area include grain production, wool growing, dairy farming and sheep and beef farming.

The town has an Australian Rules football team competing in the Picola and District Football League.

The town also boasts a general store, a Mechanics Institute, a hotel with accommodation and meals, and service, sporting and general interest clubs, such as lawn bowls, Lions International, Leo's, Police & Citizens Youth Club, tennis and Senior Citizens.

Tungamah is home to the first silo to be painted in north-east Victoria and the beginning of the North East Victoria Silo Art Trail. The silos are privately owned and Western Australian street artist Sobrane Simcock was commissioned to paint them in 2018. The murals show a Laughing Kookaburra and dancing Brolgas.

== Transport ==
Tungamah has a railway freight station with a silo on the Oaklands railway line, Victoria. A daily passenger bus service runs between Benalla and Mulwala (NSW).

== See also ==
- Tungamah Football Club

== Gallery ==
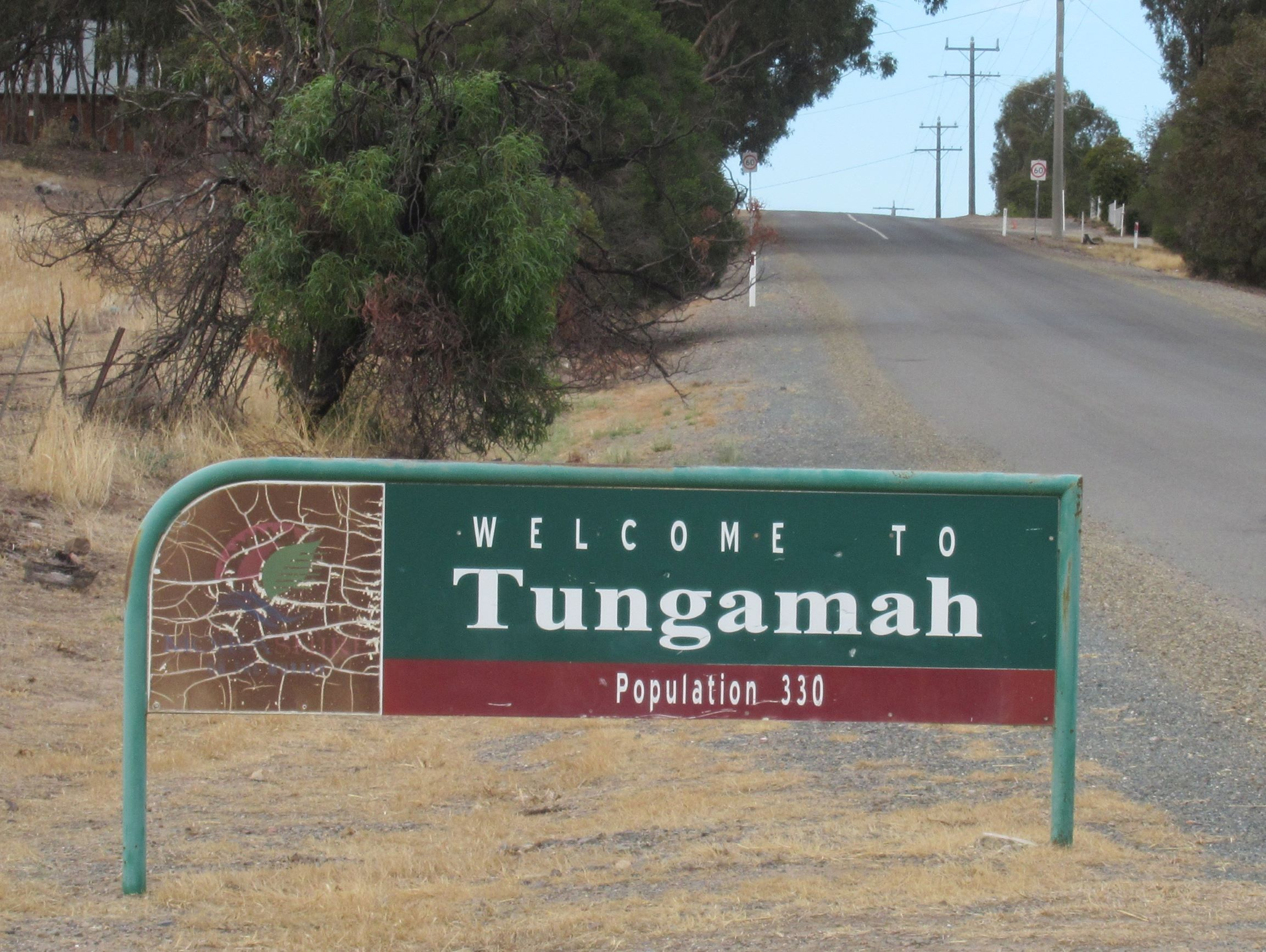
Tungamah entrance sign

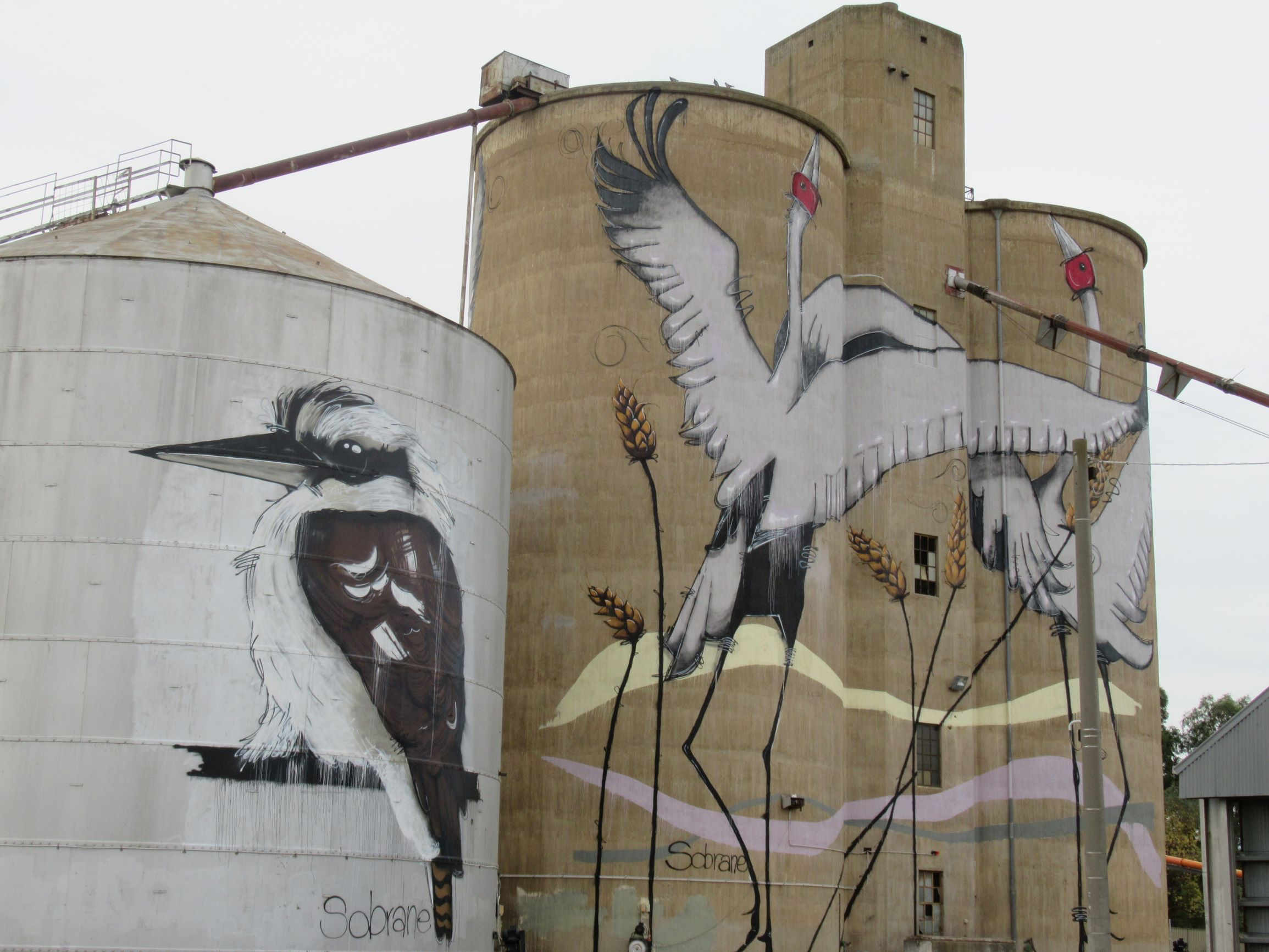
Tungamah Silo Art

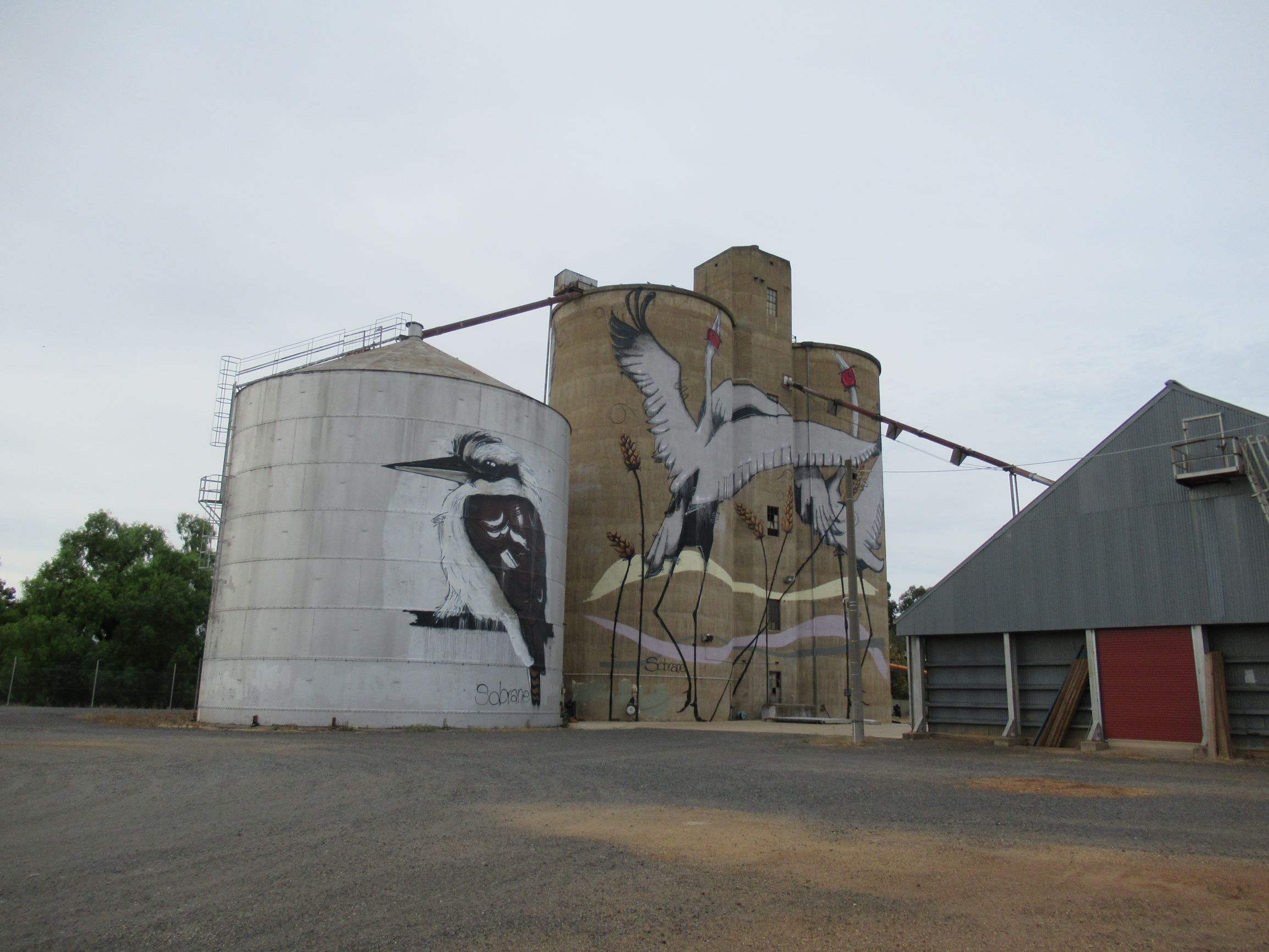
Tungamah Silo Art

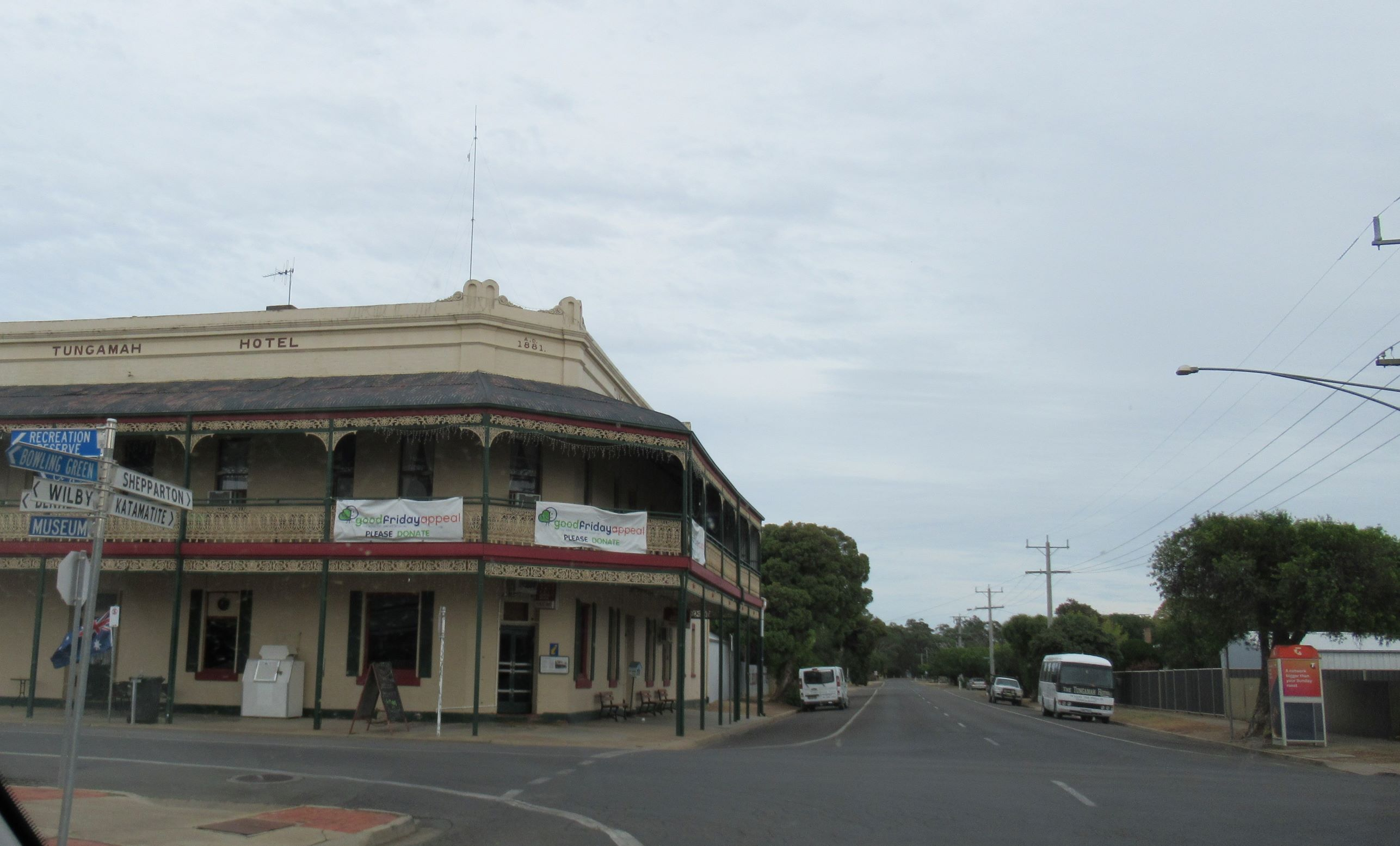
Tungamah Hotel
