= Federal District Football Association =

Australian football organization

The Federal District Football Association (FDFA) was first established in 1897 at a meeting at Gedye's Victoria Hotel, Cobram, Victoria for the purpose of controlling the "Cobram Courier Cup" Australian rules football competition.

== History ==
Football teams that competed in the FDFA during its six-year history were from the following local towns in Northern Victoria – Cobram, Katamatite, Katunga, Muckatah, Strathmerton, Yarrowayah and Southern Riverina, New South Wales teams were – Barooga, Finley and Tocumwal.

This football competition only ran for six seasons from 1897 to 1902.

== Premiers ==
- 1897: Muckatah
- 1898: Tocumwal
- 1899: Strathmerton
- 1900: Strathmerton
- 1901: Muckatah
- 1902: Cobram defeated Strathmerton
