= Peechelba =

- Town
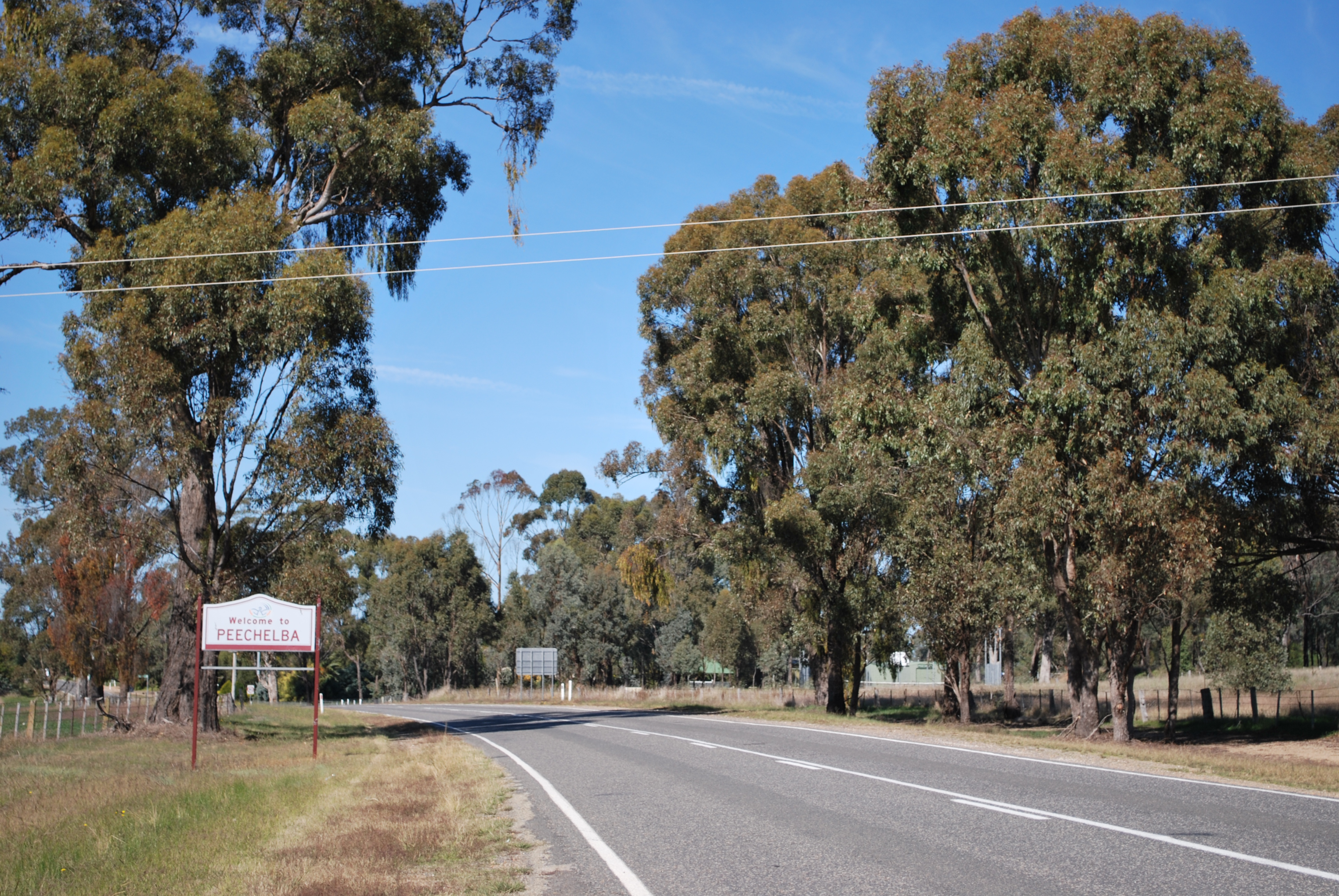
- Entering Peechelba

- Interactive map of Peechelba
- Coordinates: 36°12′S 146°14′E
- Country: Australia
- State: Victoria
- Region: Hume
- LGAs: Rural City of Wangaratta; Shire of Moira
- Location: 277 km (172 mi) NE of Melbourne; 27 km (17 mi) NW of Wangaratta; 38 km (24 mi) SE of Yarrawonga

Government
  - State electorate: Ovens Valley
  - Federal divisions: Indi; Nicholls

Population
  - Total: 345 (2011 census)
- Postcode: 3678
Localities around Peechelba
Boomahnoomoonah	Bundalong South	Boorhaman North
Wilby	Peechelba	Peechelba East
Boweya North	Killawarra	Boorahman

Peechelba is a town in north eastern Victoria, Australia. The town is located in the Rural City of Wangaratta and the Shire of Moira local government area between Wangaratta and Yarrawonga and 277 kilometres (172 mi) north east of the state capital, Melbourne. At the 2011 census, Peechelba and the surrounding area had a population of 345. The town is home to a nature reserve, not far from the Ovens River.

== History ==
Peechelba Post Office opened on 2 September 1880 to the north of the township now, and was renamed Bundalong South in 1883 when a new Peechelba office opened. This closed in 1889. In 1890 Peechelba Town office opened, closing in 1969.

To serve soldier settlers in the area, a branch railway was opened to Peechelba East on 31 October 1927, from Bowser station on the main North East railway line. The line was closed on 8 December 1986.

== Mad Dog Morgan ==
The bushranger Daniel "Mad Dog" Morgan bailed up the occupants of Peechelba Station, the MacPhersons, on the evening of 8 April 1865. On the pretence of attending to a crying child (supposed to be Christina Macpherson), a nursemaid, Alice Macdonald, escaped through a window and raised the alarm. Police soon surrounded the main homestead. Jack Quinlan, a stockman at the station, shot and fatally wounded Morgan, who died at about 1.45 p.m. on 9 April 1865. Locks were cut from his hair, his body was publicly displayed at Wangaratta (site left of current Court House), his beard was flayed from his face as a souvenir, and his head severed, to be forwarded to the professor of anatomy at the University of Melbourne. He was buried on 14 April in Wangaratta cemetery.
