= Boweya North =

- Town
- Coordinates: 36°12′45″S 146°05′42″E
- Country: Australia
- State: Victoria
- Region: Hume
- LGA: Shire of Moira

Government
  - State electorate: Ovens Valley
  - Federal division: Nicholls

Population
  - Total: 43 (2,016 census)
- Postcode: 3675
Localities around Boweya North
Almonds	Wilby	Peechelba
Almonds	Boweya North	Killawarra
Boweya	Boweya	Boweya

Boweya North is a town in the Shire of Moira local government area. According to the 2016 Australian census, the population in the locality was 43.

Boweya North Creamery post office opened in 1902, renamed to Yeerip in August 1906 and was closed on 30 July 1932.
