= Pelluebla =

Town in Victoria, Australia

- Town
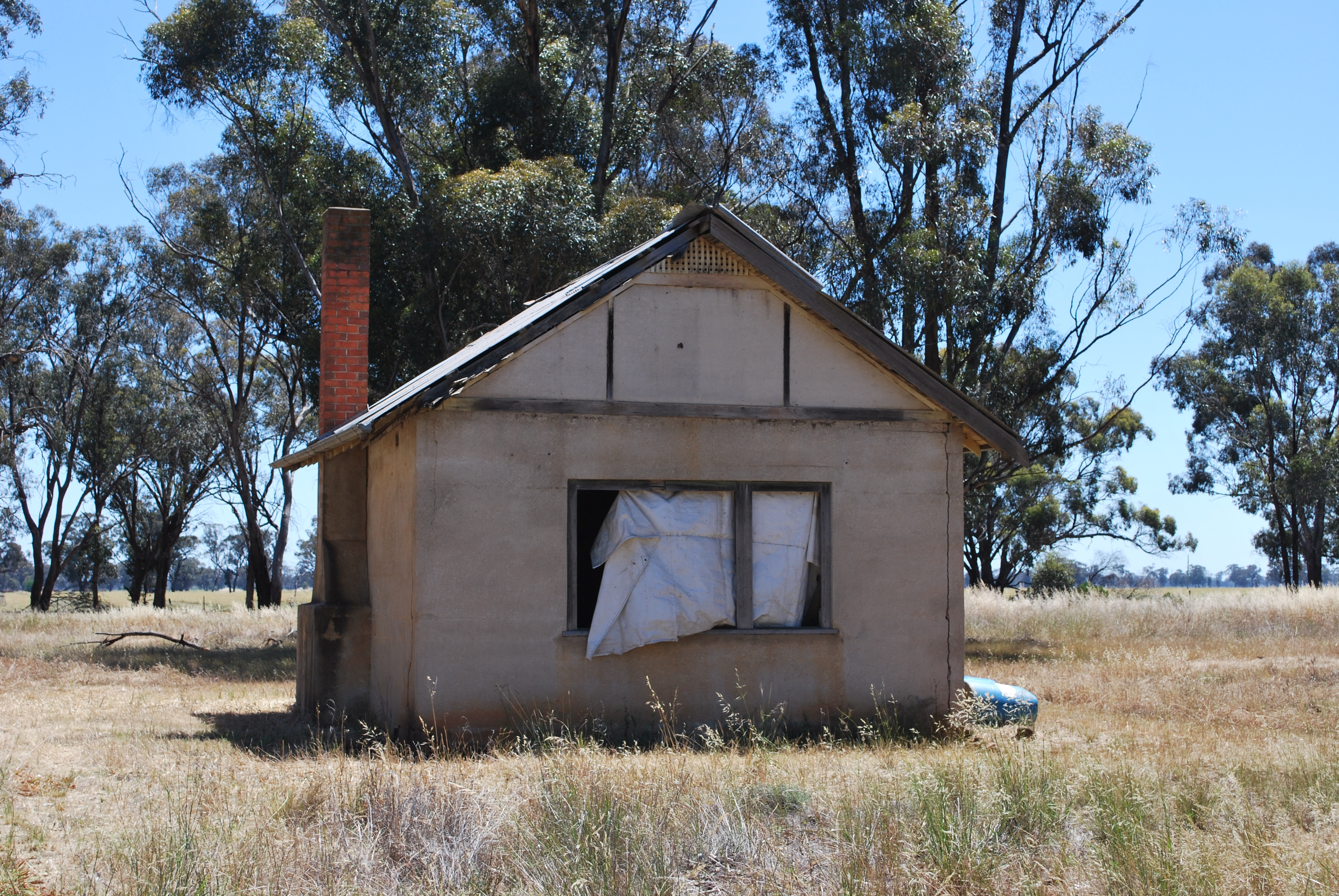
- The former Pelluebla South Primary School

- Coordinates: 36°11′56″S 145°58′01″E
- Country: Australia
- State: Victoria
- Region: Hume
- LGA: Shire of Moira

Government
  - State electorate: Ovens Valley
  - Federal division: Nicholls

Population
  - Total: 33 (2016 census)
- Postcode: 3727
Localities around Pelluebla
Tungamah	Tungamah	Wilby
Tungamah	Pelluebla	Almonds
St James	Lake Rowan	Almonds

Pelluebla is a locality in Victoria, Australia in the Shire of Moira local government area.

Pelluebla post office opened on 1 April 1880 and closed on 1 July 1893.
