= Upper Goulburn =

- Wine region
- Official name: Upper Goulburn
- Type: Australian Geographical Indication
- Year established: 2003
- Country: Australia
- Part of: Central Victoria

Upper Goulburn is a wine region in the Australian state of Victoria. It was designated as an Australian Geographical Indication on 14 October 2003. It is located north of the Yarra Valley wine region on slopes that drain to the north and west into the Goulburn River and eventually the Murray River. To its north are the wine regions of Goulburn Valley, Strathbogie Ranges and King Valley.

Lake Eildon is in the east of the region, and the Goulburn River flows through the region towards the west. Vineyards are planted from a low of 250 metres (820 ft) above sea level up to as high as 800 metres (2,600 ft).
