= Telford, Victoria =

Telford
- Town
- Coordinates: 36°05′56″S 145°55′52″E
- Country: Australia
- State: Victoria
- Region: Hume
- LGA: Shire of Moira

Government
  - State electorate: Ovens Valley
  - Federal division: Nicholls

Population
  - Total: 242016 census
- Postcode: 3730
Localities around Telford
Burramine	Yarrawonga	Yarrawonga South
Burramine South	Telford	Wilby
Tungamah	Tungamah	Wilby

Telford is a locality in Victoria on the Oaklands railway line, Victoria.

== Transport ==
It is served by a wheat silo. The branchline is now freight only and no longer carries passenger trains.

== See also ==
- Oaklands railway line, Victoria
