= St James, Victoria =

St James
- Town
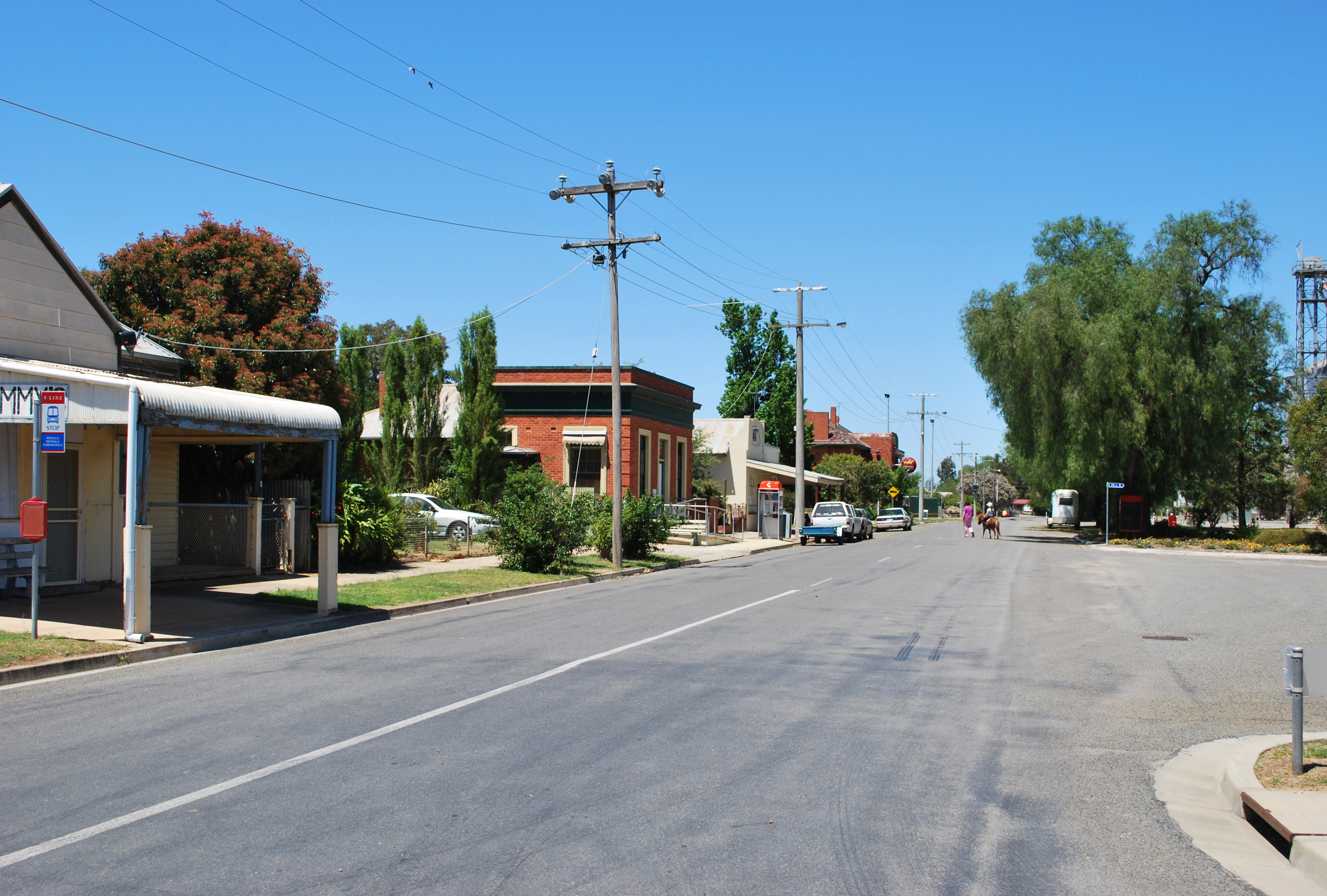
- Main street of St James

- Interactive map of St James
- Coordinates: 36°14′28″S 145°53′42″E
- Country: Australia
- State: Victoria
- Region: Hume
- LGA: Shire of Moira
- Location: 238 km (148 mi) N of Melbourne; 48 km (30 mi) E of Shepparton; 37 km (23 mi) N of Benalla; 12 km (7.5 mi) S of Tungamah

Government
  - State electorate: Ovens Valley
  - Federal division: Nicholls

Population
  - Total: 132 (2016 census)
- Postcode: 3727
- County: Australia
Localities around St James
Tungamah	Tungamah	Pelluebla
Waggarandall	St James	Lake Rowan
Yundool	Devenish	Devenish

St James is a town in northern Victoria, Australia. The town is located in the Shire of Moira local government area, 238 kilometres (148 mi) north of the state capital, Melbourne. At the 2016 census, St James had a population of 132.

The town of St James came into being as a result of selectors taking up land in the district. The first selection of land in the St James area was thought to be in 1870.

St James was the location of the first business of G.J Coles, founder of the Coles Group.

The town is located the Oaklands railway line that continues to Yarrawonga and across the border to Oaklands in New South Wales.

St James Post Office opened on 10 July 1899.

Former Carlton Football Club premiership captain, James "Jim" Flynn played for many years with the St. James Football Club before and after his playing days in the Victorian Football League. Jim was still playing football with the St. James Football Club in his early 40s and was a member of the St. James Football Club 1911 and 1913 premiership teams.

Golfers play at the course of the St James Golf Club.
