= Wilby, Victoria =

Wilby
- Town
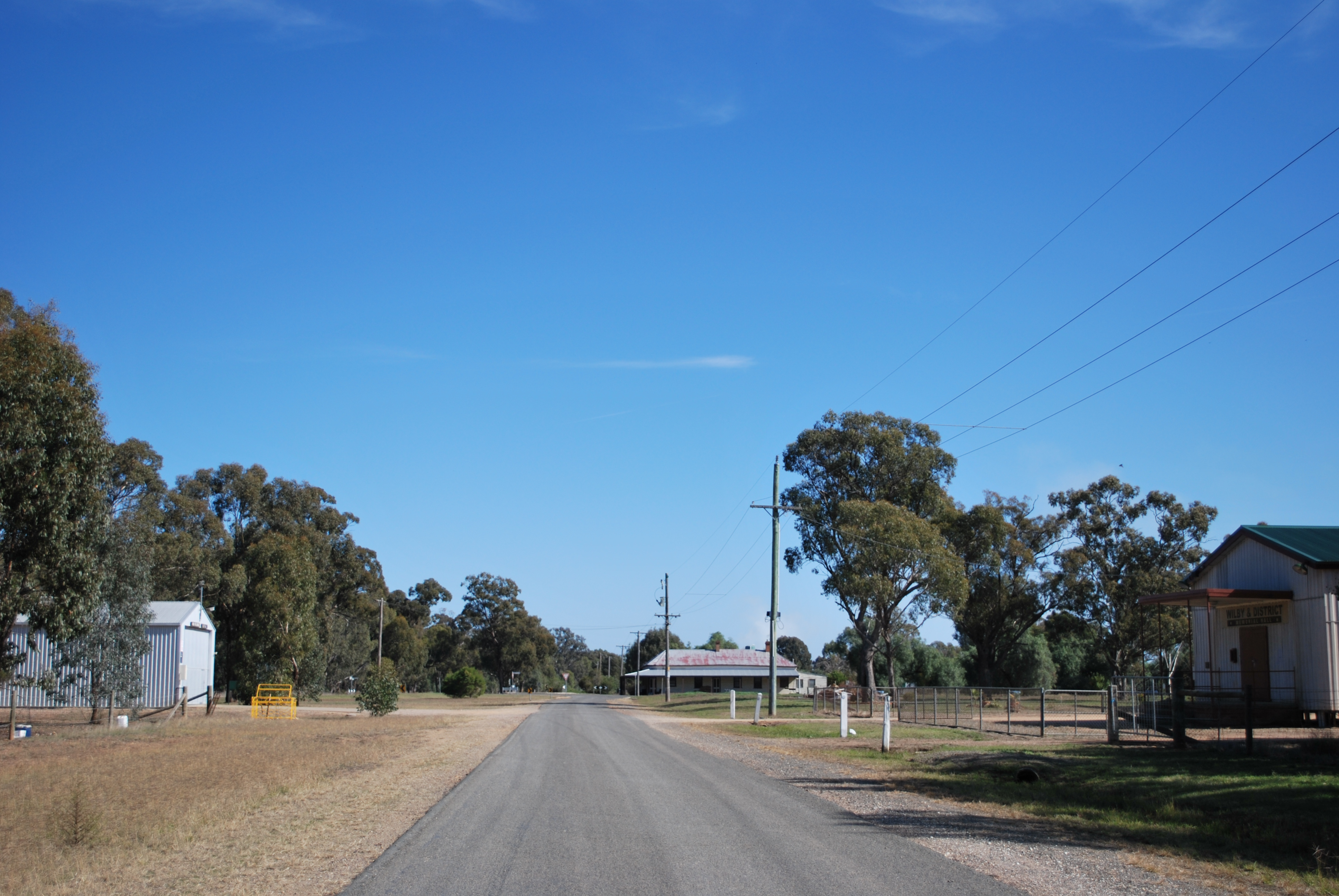
- Wilby looking towards the old Wilby pub

- Interactive map of Wilby
- Coordinates: 36°09′28″S 146°00′57″E
- Country: Australia
- State: Victoria
- Region: Hume
- LGA: Shire of Moira

Government
  - State electorate: Ovens Valley
  - Federal division: Nicholls

Population
  - Total: 166 (2016 census)
- Postcode: 3728
Localities around Wilby
Telford	Yarrawonga South	Boomahnoomoonah
Tungamah	Wilby	Peechelba
Pelluebla	Almonds	Boweya North

Wilby is a town in the Shire of Moira Local Government Area, Victoria. The post office opened on 10 July 1883 and was closed on 30 June 1978.

At the 2016 census, Wilby had a population of 166.
