= Boosey, Victoria =

Boosey
- Town
- Coordinates: 36°03′18″S 145°47′45″E
- Country: Australia
- State: Victoria
- Region: Hume
- LGA: Shire of Moira

Government
  - State electorate: Ovens Valley
  - Federal division: Nicholls

Population
  - Total: 108 (2021 census)
- Postcode: 3730
Localities around Boosey
Cobram East	New South Wales	Burramine
Katamatite East	Boosey	Burramine South
Katamatite	Youarang	Tungamah

Boosey is a locality in the Shire of Moira, Victoria, Australia. Boosey post office opened on 1 August 1882 and was closed on 17 January 1948. Boosey North post office opened on 2 July 1883 and was on 1 July 1893. Burramine West post office was in the locality of Boosey and was opened on 16 October 1878 and was closed on 28 March 1884.
