= Lake Rowan =

- Town
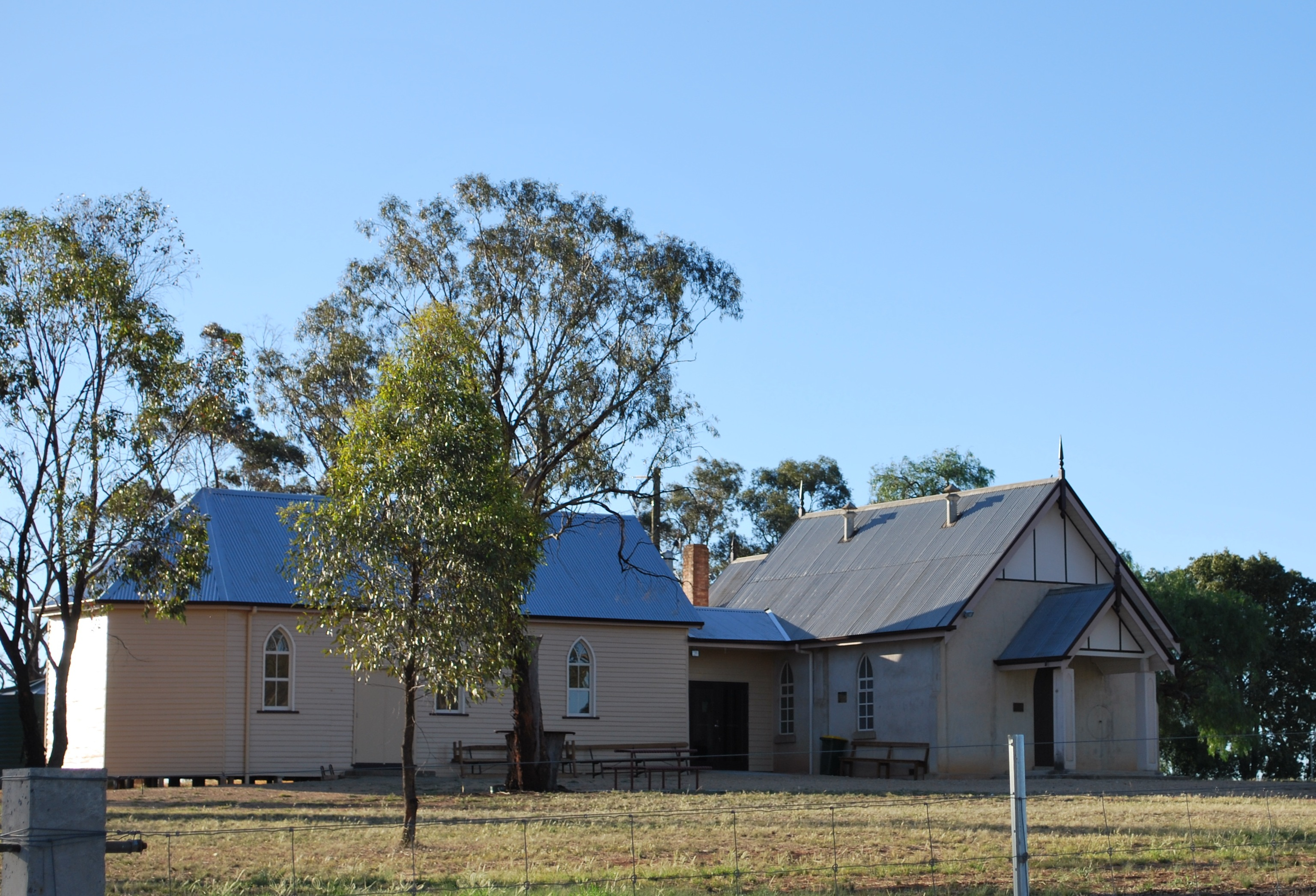
- Public hall, 2008

- Coordinates: 36°16′11″S 145°58′01″E
- Country: Australia
- State: Victoria
- Region: Hume
- LGA: Shire of Moira

Government
  - State electorate: Ovens Valley
  - Federal division: Nicholls

Population
  - Total: 66 (2016 census)
- Postcode: 3727
Localities around Lake Rowan
Pelluebla	Pelluebla	Almonds
St James	Lake Rowan	Bungeet
Devenish	Bungeet West	Bungeet West

Lake Rowan is a locality in northern Victoria, Australia. It is in the local government area of the Shire of Moira. The locality is named for "Lake Rowan"—a reserve with a dry swamp.

In the Jerilderie Letter, Ned Kelly states he used local resident Mr. Swanhill to sell his horses in October 1877. Lake Rowan post office opened on 1 July 1875 and was closed on 30 November 1981. The town has a cemetery (first burial 1870s) with former Geelong and Carlton (Premiership Player) Jim Flynn (1871–1955) interred.
