= Burramine =

- Town
- Coordinates: 35°59′42″S 145°54′09″E
- Country: Australia
- State: Victoria
- Region: Hume
- LGA: Shire of Moira

Government
  - State electorate: Ovens Valley
  - Federal division: Nicholls

Population
  - Total: 241 (SAL 2021)
- Postcode: 3730
Localities around Burramine
New South Wales	New South Wales	New South Wales
Boosey	Burramine	Yarrawonga
Boosey	Burramine South	Telford

Burramine is a locality in the local government area of the Shire of Moira in Australia.

== History ==
Burramine post office opened on 24 July 1876, closed on 1 July 1895, reopened on 13 August 1900 and was closed on 3 January 1908.

Burramine East post office opened on 1 April 1882, closed on 1 July 1895, reopened in 1902 and was closed on 31 March 1923.

Burramine North State School post office opened on 6 January 1913 and was closed on 31 March 1914.

Burramine West post office is located in the suburb of Boosey and is not in the locality of Burramine.

== Sport and recreation ==
The Burramine Athletic Club Carnival officially commenced in 1951 and ran up until 2014, with the 120 metre Burramine Gift sprint race as the main event. From 1953 onwards the carnival was held at the Grove Oval, now called the J C Lowe Oval, Yarrawonga.
