= Bathumi =

- Town
- Coordinates: 36°02′18″S 146°05′05″E
- Country: Australia
- State: Victoria
- Region: Hume
- LGA: Shire of Moira

Government
  - State electorate: Ovens Valley
  - Federal division: Nicholls

Population
  - Total: 62(2016 census)
- Postcode: 3730
Localities around Bathumi
New South Wales	New South Wales	New South Wales
Yarrowonga	Bathumi	Bundalong
Yarrawonga	Yarrawonga	Bundalong

Bathumi is a town in the Shire of Moira local government area. The Ski-Land Motel is in Bathumi and is located on the corner of Boomahnoomoonah Road and the Murray Valley Highway. It has a range of activities including fishing, table-tennis and many more activities.
