= Almonds, Victoria =

Almonds
- Town
- Coordinates: 36°12′43″S 146°01′52″E
- Country: Australia
- State: Victoria
- Region: Hume
- LGA: Shire of Moira

Government
  - State electorate: Ovens Valley
  - Federal division: Nicholls

Population
  - Total: 31 (2021 census)
- Postcode: 3727
Localities around Almonds
Pelluebla	Wilby	Wilby
Lake Rowan	Almonds	Boweya North
Lake Rowan	Bungeet	Boweya

Almonds is a locality in Victoria, Australia. The post office opened on 15 August 1901, closed on 28 December 1919, reopened on 23 December 1925 and later closed on 24 November 1952.
