= Bundalong =

- Town
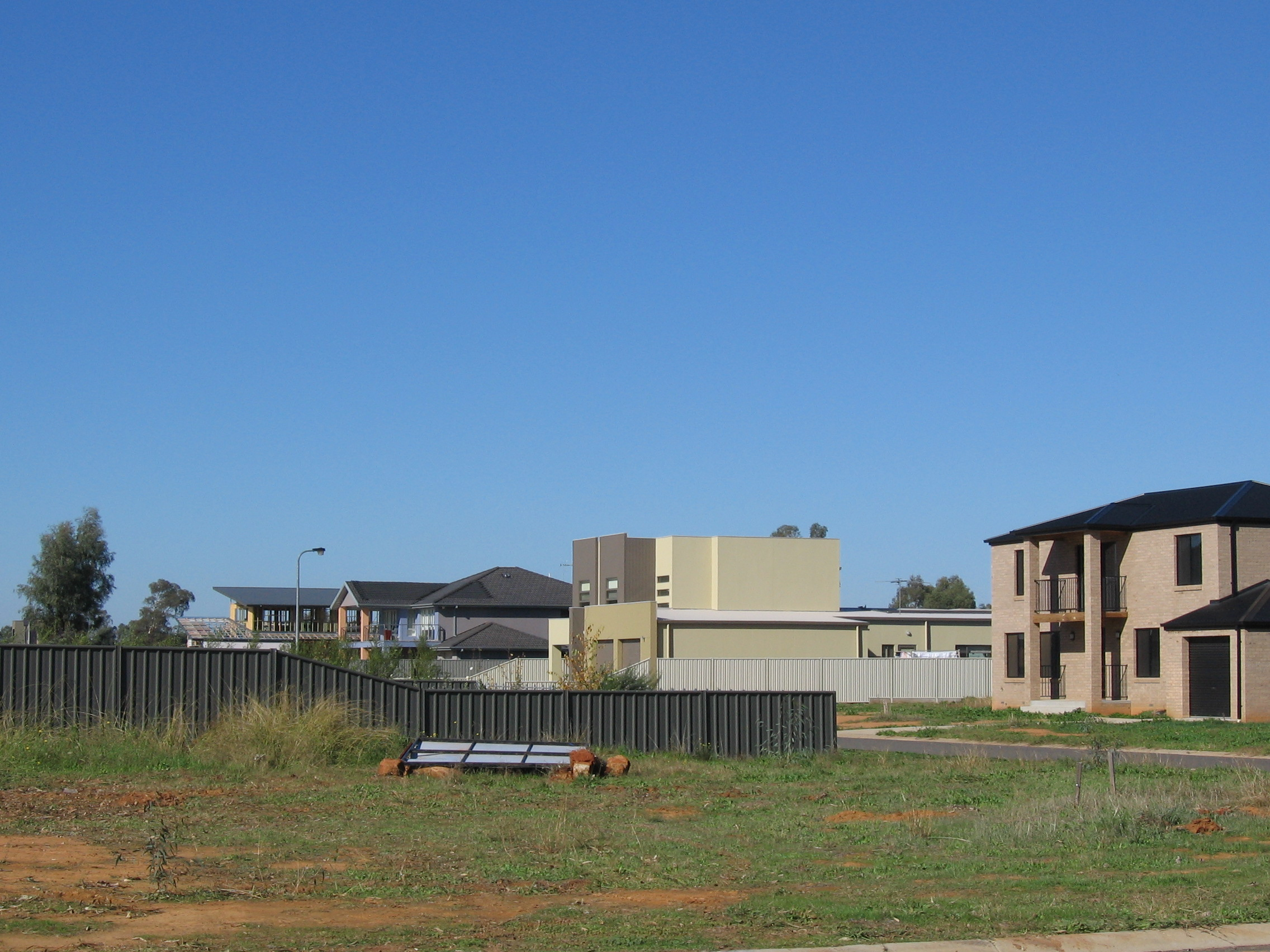
- Houses at Bundalong

- Interactive map of Bundalong
- Coordinates: 36°02′S 146°10′E
- Country: Australia
- State: Victoria
- Region: Hume
- LGA: Shire of Moira
- Location: 278 km (173 mi) from Melbourne; 74 km (46 mi) from Wodonga; 95 km (59 mi) from Shepparton; 17 km (11 mi) from Yarrawonga

Government
  - State electorate: Ovens Valley
  - Federal division: Nicholls

Population
  - Total: 512 (2021 census)
- Postcode: 3730
Localities around Bundalong
Bathumi	New South Wales	New South Wales
Yarrawonga	Bundalong	Esmond
Yarrawonga South	Boomahnoomoonah	Bundalong South

Bundalong is a town in Victoria, Australia located on the Murray River and the Murray Valley Highway, east of Yarrawonga. At the 2016 census, Bundalong had a population of 428. Bundalong is in the Shire of Moira local government area, with the name "Bundalong" being an Aboriginal meaning "joined together". The town's farming sites include wheat plantations.

== History ==
The Bundalong post office opened on 2 October 1876 and closed in 1940.
