= City of Echuca =

Coordinates: 36°08′S 144°45′E

City of Echuca Victoria
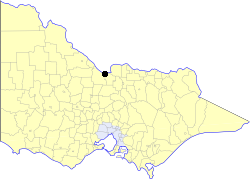
- Location in Victoria
- The City of Echuca as at its dissolution in 1994
- Population: 9,740 (1992)
  - Density: 373.75/km^{2} (968.0/sq mi)
- Established: 1865
- Area: 26.06 km^{2} (10.1 sq mi)
- Council seat: Echuca
- Region: North Central Victoria
- County: Gunbower, Rodney
LGAs around City of Echuca:
	Murray (NSW)
Rochester	City of Echuca	Deakin

The City of Echuca was a local government area in Victoria, Australia, about 200 kilometres (124 mi) north of Melbourne, the state capital. Based around the regional centre of Echuca, along the Murray River, the city covered an area of 26.06 square kilometres (10.1 sq mi), and existed from 1865 until 1994.

== History ==
The Borough of Echuca was incorporated on 3 January 1865, and became a city on 1 March 1965, just after its centenary celebrations.

On 18 November 1994, the City of Echuca was abolished, and along with the Town of Kyabram, the Shires of Deakin, Rochester and Waranga, and some neighbouring districts, was merged into the newly created Shire of Campaspe.

=== Wards ===
The City of Echuca was not divided into wards, and its nine councillors represented all electors in the city.

== Population ==
Year	Population
1954	5,405
1958	6,130*
1961	5,443
1966	7,046
1971	7,505
1976	7,873
1981	7,943
1986	8,409
1991	9,438

* Estimate in the 1958 Victorian Year Book.
