= Shire of Rochester =

Coordinates: 36°22′S 144°42′E

Shire of Rochester Victoria
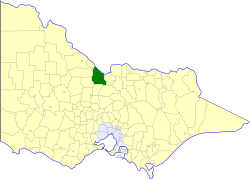
- Location in Victoria
- The Shire of Rochester as at its dissolution in 1994
- Population: 7,900 (1992)
  - Density: 4.084/km^{2} (10.58/sq mi)
- Established: 1864
- Abolished: 1994
- Area: 1,934.25 km^{2} (746.8 sq mi)
- Council seat: Rochester
- Region: North Central Victoria
- County: Bendigo, Gunbower, Rodney
LGAs around Shire of Rochester:
Cohuna	Murray (NSW)	Murray (NSW)
Gordon	Shire of Rochester	Deakin
East Loddon	Huntly	Waranga

The Shire of Rochester was a local government area in Victoria, Australia, about 190 kilometres (118 mi) north of Melbourne, the state capital, and immediately west and southwest of the town of Echuca. The shire covered an area of 1,934.25 square kilometres (746.8 sq mi), and existed from 1864 until 1994.

== History ==
Rochester Shire was the final remnant of what was originally the vast Echuca Road District, incorporated on 19 February 1864, and redesignated as Echuca Shire in 1871. (Echuca Shire should not be confused with the separate local government area of Echuca Borough, which was also established in 1864, and proclaimed a city in 1965. This borough covered only the Echuca urban area and the rural area immediately surrounding it.)

The Echuca Road District extended along the south bank of the Murray River, from Mount Hope Creek in the west to the Ovens River in the east. Following its redesignation as Echuca Shire, it lost the eastern two-thirds of its area through severances, which created the Shires of Yarrawonga in 1878 and Shepparton in 1879. However, on 10 October 1879, the shire gained a large area which was annexed from the Shire of Waranga. On 30 May 1892, the Moira Ward of Echuca Shire was annexed to Shepparton Shire (which had been renamed Shire of Numurkah in 1885), fixing the boundary between Numurkah and Echuca Shires at the Goulburn River. Following this, the eastern part of what remained of Echuca Shire (roughly the area east of the Campaspe River) was severed and incorporated on 20 April 1893 as the Shire of Deakin.

The western part, still known as the Shire of Echuca, was renamed Shire of Rochester on 27 October 1909. On 1 January 1966 and again on 1 February 1976, the City of Echuca annexed land at Rochester's northeastern corner.

On 18 November 1994, the Shire of Rochester was abolished, and along with the City of Echuca, the Town of Kyabram, the Shires of Deakin and Waranga, and a number of neighbouring districts, was merged into the newly created Shire of Campaspe.

== Wards ==
Rochester was divided into three wards, each of which elected three councillors:

- North Ward
- South Ward
- Rochester Ward

== Population ==
Year	Population
1954	6,330
1958	6,660*
1961	7,253
1966	7,418
1971	7,587
1976	7,157
1981	7,152
1986	6,988
1991	7,424

* Estimate in the 1958 Victorian Year Book.
