= Goulburn Valley =

Sub-region of Hume, Victoria, Australia

Coordinates: 36°22′59″S 145°23′56″E

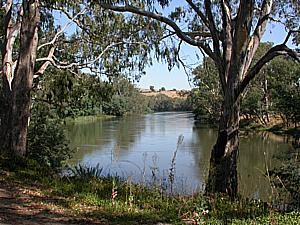
The middle reaches of the Goulburn River at Seymour.

The Goulburn Valley is a sub-region, part of the Hume region of the Australian state of Victoria. The sub-region consists of those areas in the catchment of the Goulburn River and other nearby streams, and is part of the Murray-Darling Basin. The Goulburn Valley is bordered on the south by the Great Dividing Range and to the north by the Murray River, the state border with New South Wales. The sub-region is one of Australia's most productive and intensively farmed areas and is predominantly irrigated.

Major regional centres of the Goulburn Valley are Shepparton, Seymour, Echuca, Benalla, Yarrawonga and Kyabram.

== History ==
Aboriginal groups inhabited the Goulburn Valley region prior to European settlement. In the central Goulburn around Nagambie, the traditional owners were the Natrakboolok, Ngooraialum or Thagungwurung tribes. Downstream, at Shepparton, the area was inhabited by the Yorta Yorta people. The Taungurung people are the traditional owners and inhabitants of the area Seymour now occupies.

European Settlement In 1824, Hume and Hovell on their return from Port Phillip, camped by the Goulburn River not far upstream of Seymour. In 1836 Major Mitchell crossed the Goulburn at Mitchellstown near Nagambie and soon afterwards overlanders and other early settlers began to use this crossing place on the Melbourne-Sydney route (now known as the Hume Highway). The mail service between Melbourne and Sydney had been operating for just a year when it was found that a better route was available using the "New Crossing Place" (now Seymour).

== Economy ==
Industries in the Goulburn Valley include agricultural activities such as fruit growing and dairying, which supply processing plants in Shepparton and outlying towns such as Kyabram and Cobram. This food processing industry produces around 25% of Victoria's rural output. The SPC Ardmona plant, founded in 1917 in Shepparton, is one of the world's largest fruit canneries. Other important agricultural activities include woolgrowing and cropping. Water for irrigation is sourced from Lake Eildon and Goulburn Weir, with Lake Eildon supplying over half the water used in the Shepparton irrigation district.

== Wine ==
The Goulburn Valley wine region stretches from Seymour to Echuca on the Murray River. Wine production began in the region in 1860. A syndicate raised £25,000 to develop the Tahbilk winery. By 1875 trade with England had been established, and the winery was producing the equivalent of 70,000 cases of wine per year. Due to the sandy soil, Tahbilk was able to withstand the spread of Phylloxera, and in 1925 was the only winery in the area. As a result, the region is home to the oldest and largest plantings of Marsanne grape variety in the world. Other wine varieties grown include Chardonnay, Cabernet Sauvignon, Riesling and Shiraz. As well as Tahbilk, other major wineries include Michelton between Seymour and Nagambie, Wine by Sam, Fowles Wines and boutique vineyards Box Grove and Brave Goose vineyard in the south near Seymour and Monichino near Katunga in the north. Nagambie Lakes is a recognised and protected subregion of the Goulburn Valley wine region.

Each year Tastes of the Goulburn food and wine festival is hosted in Seymour, showcasing the best local produce from the Goulburn Valley. Seymour also hosts the Victorian Wine Show.

== Politics ==
Local government in the region is provided by the City of Greater Shepparton and the Shires of Mitchell, Moira, Campaspe, Murrindindi, and Strathbogie. The region is represented at the federal level in the Australian House of Representatives by the Division of Nicholls as well as parts of the Divisions of McEwen and Indi. At the state level, the region includes the Electoral districts of Shepparton, Murray Plains, Euroa and Eildon.

== Transport ==
Major transport routes through the Goulburn Valley region include the Goulburn Valley Highway, Midland Highway and the Murray Valley Highway. Passenger rail services are provided from Melbourne to Seymour railway station the junction for they North East and Goulburn Valley lines which was opened in 1872 and then onto Shepparton and Echuca by V/Line.

== See also ==
- Australian wine
- Goulburn Valley Football League
- Upper Goulburn
