= Yarrawonga =

- Town
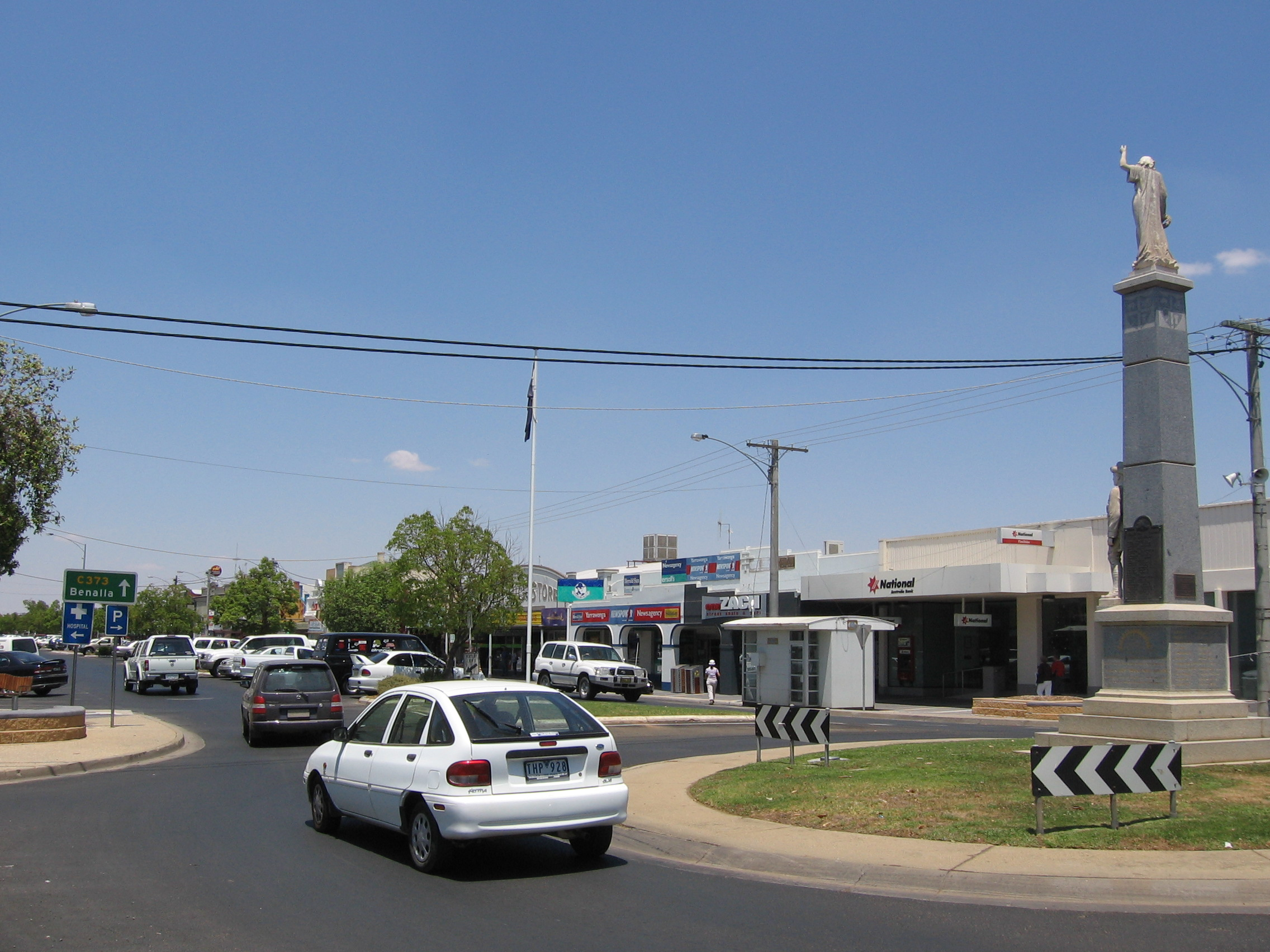
- Belmore street

- Interactive map of Yarrawonga
- Coordinates: 36°01′0″S 146°0′0″E
- Country: Australia
- State: Victoria
- Region: Hume
- LGA: Shire of Moira
- Location: 268 km (167 mi) NNE of Melbourne; 92 km (57 mi) W of Albury (NSW); 81 km (50 mi) NE of Shepparton; 89 km (55 mi) W of Wodonga; 433 km (269 mi) WSW of Canberra

Government
  - State electorate: Ovens Valley
  - Federal division: Nicholls
- Elevation: 128.9 m (423 ft)

Population
  - Total: 8,661 (2021 census)
- Postcode: 3730
- Mean max temp: 23.0 °C (73.4 °F)
- Mean min temp: 9.0 °C (48.2 °F)
- Annual rainfall: 477.2 mm (18.79 in)
Localities around Yarrawonga
Burramine	Mulwala (NSW)	Mulwala (NSW)
Burramine	Yarrawonga	Bathumi
Telford	Yarrawonga South	Bundalong

Yarrawonga /jærəˈwɒŋɡə/ is a town in the Shire of Moira local government area in the Australian state of Victoria. In the 2021 census, Yarrawonga had a population of 8,661 people.

== Geography ==
The town is located approximately 264 kilometres (164 mi) north-east of the state capital, Melbourne, situated on the south bank of the Murray River, the border between Victoria and New South Wales.

Yarrawonga's twin town of Mulwala is on the other side of the Murray River, and Lake Mulwala.

== History ==
Yarrawonga is Aboriginal, meaning 'cormorant’s nesting place,' 'where the cormorant builds' or 'yarra' meaning 'waterfalls,' and 'wonga' meaning 'pigeon.' It is believed the Mulla Walla people occupied the area before the first white settlers arrived in 1842.

Yarrawonga was founded as a village in 1868, with a Post Office being opened on 28 November 1874, and a courthouse the very same year. It was connected by rail to Melbourne in 1886.

Yarrawonga was proclaimed a shire in 1891, It was renamed from 'North Yarrawonga Shire' (1891) to 'Yarrawonga Shire' in 1893.

Yarrawonga Weir and Lake Mulwala were constructed in the late 1930s as part of the Murray-Darling Irrigation Scheme.

Historically, one of the major industries in the Yarrawonga/Mulwala area has been the explosives factory, which was constructed in Mulwala over 1942–43. It is now operated by French company Thales but remains an Australian Department of Defence asset.

The Yarrawonga Magistrates' Court closed on 1 January 1990.

== Demographics ==
In the 2016 census, Yarrawonga recorded a population of 7,930, 51.1% female and 48.9% male. The median age of the Yarrawonga population was 50 years, 12 years above the national median of 38. 81.9% of people living in Yarrawonga were born in Australia. The other top responses for country of birth were England 2.4%, Scotland 0.7%, New Zealand 0.5%, India 0.4% and the Philippines 0.4%. 88.4% of people spoke only English at home; the next most common languages were 0.2% Italian, 0.2% Gujarati, 0.2% Punjabi, 0.2% French and 0.1% German.

In the 2021 census, Yarrawonga recorded a population of 8,661 people, 51.5% female and 48.5% male. The median age of the Yarrawonga population was 52 years, 14 years above the national median of 38. 84.8% of people living in Yarrawonga were born in Australia. The other top responses for country of birth were England 2.2%, New Zealand 0.7%, the Philippines 0.6%, Scotland 0.6%, and Germany 0.5%. 90.6% of people spoke only English at home; the next most common languages were 0.3% Filipino, 0.3% Italian, 0.3% Punjabi, 0.3% Cantonese, and 0.2% Urdu.

== Sport ==
The Yarrawonga Football Club (the 'Mighty Pigeons') participates in the Ovens and Murray Football League in the sport of Australian rules football, which has produced Barry Mitchell, Joel Smith, Ben Dixon, and Tom Lonergan as well as Caleb Mitchell.

The town also has a popular cricket club, the 'Yarrawonga-Mulwala Lakers', who have a junior program and everything up to A Grade.

== Transport ==
Public transport in Yarrawonga is minimal. On Orr Street next to the Town hall, you'll find the town's V/Line bus stop. It heads to the Benalla railway station three times daily, at 6:43 AM, 12:49 PM and 5:20 PM respectively. From there, the Benalla railway station goes directly to Southern Cross Station, making it a simple, if infrequent way to get to Melbourne. As of June 2026, it seems this is the only line in operation for now.

Yarrawonga is served by a standard gauge branch railway, which branches off the Melbourne-Sydney line at Benalla and terminates at Oaklands in New South Wales. The 'Oaklands Line' and Yarrawonga railway station was in use for passengers from 1886 to December of 1978. Today, the station stands and is in good condition, but has been repurposed. It is believed to be an office for the adjacent GrainCorp silos.

== Attractions ==
Yarrawonga's main attraction is Lake Mulwala, formed by the damming of the Murray River. The lake is a popular location for activities such as boating, kayaking and fishing. There are two crossings of the Murray between Yarrawonga and Mulwala; across the weir (Walking path only); and a bridge over Lake Mulwala. This bridge contains an unusual bend and dip in the middle, a result of miscommunication between the two state governments.

== Climate ==
Yarrawonga has a humid subtropical climate (Cfa) with hot, dry summers and cool, cloudy winters. As a rule of thumb to predict oncoming weather, one should look to the sky westward (works every time). The weather radar at Yarrawonga has proven a useful tool in monitoring important weather systems as far south as Marysville, west to Bendigo and north to Griffith, meeting its eastern limit at the Snowy Mountains and is thus a reliable monitor of snowfall systems approaching from the west.

Climate data for Yarrawonga (1993–2024); 129 m AMSL; 36.03° S, 146.03° E
Month	Jan	Feb	Mar	Apr	May	Jun	Jul	Aug	Sep	Oct	Nov	Dec	Year
Record high °C (°F)	46.0 (114.8)	46.0 (114.8)	39.9 (103.8)	36.7 (98.1)	28.9 (84.0)	23.0 (73.4)	21.0 (69.8)	25.7 (78.3)	34.0 (93.2)	36.4 (97.5)	42.4 (108.3)	44.3 (111.7)	46.0 (114.8)
Mean daily maximum °C (°F)	32.9 (91.2)	31.7 (89.1)	28.1 (82.6)	23.0 (73.4)	18.1 (64.6)	14.5 (58.1)	13.6 (56.5)	15.3 (59.5)	18.6 (65.5)	22.8 (73.0)	27.2 (81.0)	30.3 (86.5)	23.0 (73.4)
Mean daily minimum °C (°F)	16.1 (61.0)	15.7 (60.3)	13.0 (55.4)	9.1 (48.4)	6.1 (43.0)	4.0 (39.2)	3.4 (38.1)	3.7 (38.7)	5.1 (41.2)	7.5 (45.5)	11.1 (52.0)	13.4 (56.1)	9.0 (48.2)
Record low °C (°F)	4.4 (39.9)	4.7 (40.5)	3.3 (37.9)	−0.5 (31.1)	−1.9 (28.6)	−5.3 (22.5)	−4.4 (24.1)	−6.0 (21.2)	−3.4 (25.9)	−1.4 (29.5)	0.6 (33.1)	2.2 (36.0)	−6.0 (21.2)
Average rainfall mm (inches)	36.4 (1.43)	39.0 (1.54)	35.4 (1.39)	31.9 (1.26)	35.8 (1.41)	42.4 (1.67)	44.9 (1.77)	39.1 (1.54)	42.8 (1.69)	42.1 (1.66)	48.1 (1.89)	41.2 (1.62)	479.4 (18.87)
Average rainy days (≥ 0.2mm)	5.7	5.4	5.1	6.2	10.3	14.7	17.1	14.1	10.2	8.6	8.1	6.1	111.6
Average afternoon relative humidity (%)	29	32	33	42	54	65	66	58	53	43	34	29	45
Source: Bureau of Meteorology

== Popular culture ==
- Neil McBeath wrote the song "I'm Going Back To Yarrawonga", published in 1919 and later recorded by Ella Shields and Leonard Hubbard in 1992 and 1996 respectively. The town's footy club uses an interpolation of this song.
- Yarrawonga is also home to Australia's Tallest Man, Kewal Shiels, measuring 7 feet 3 inches (221 cm).

== Gallery ==
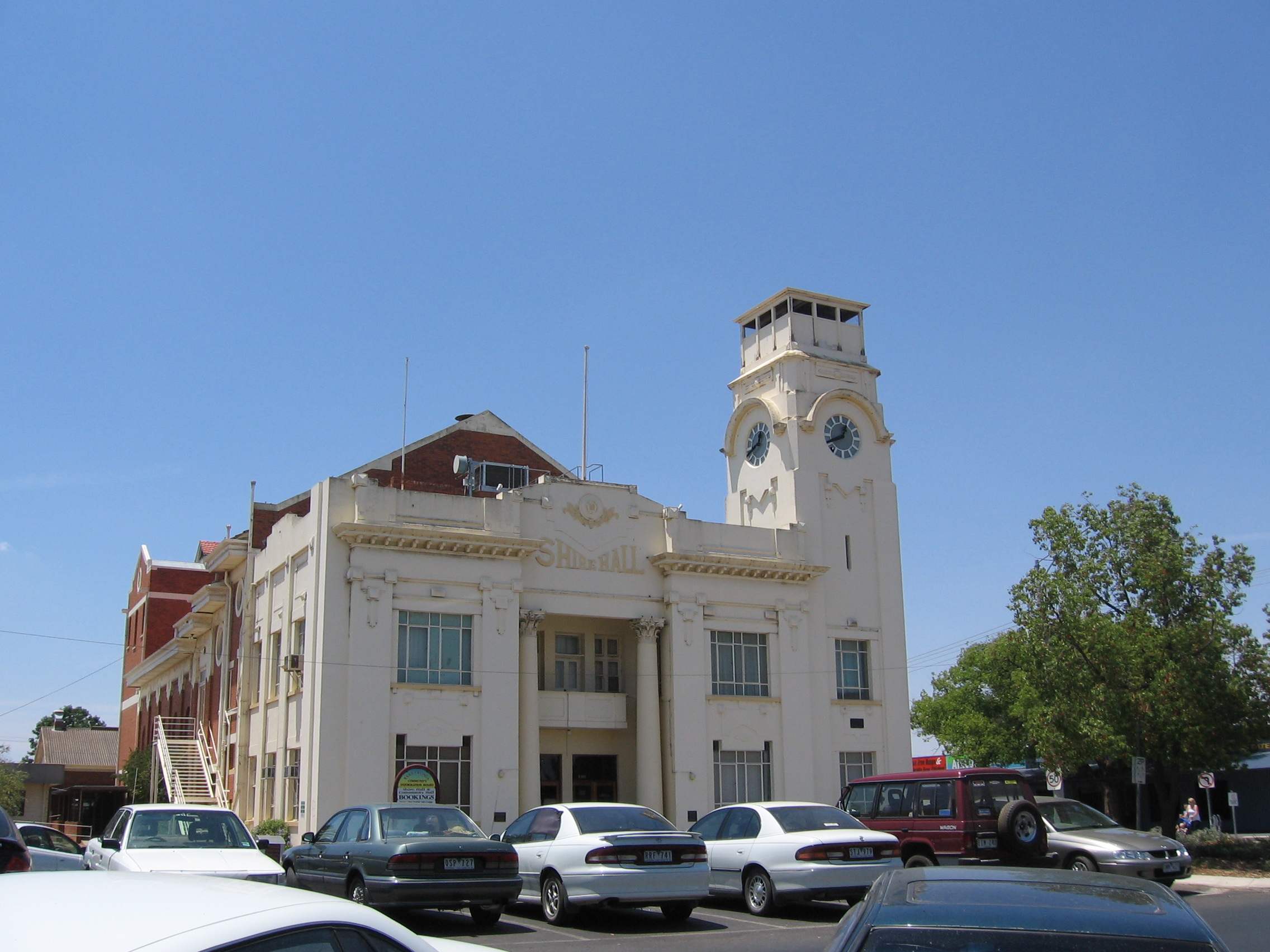
Yarrawonga Town Hall

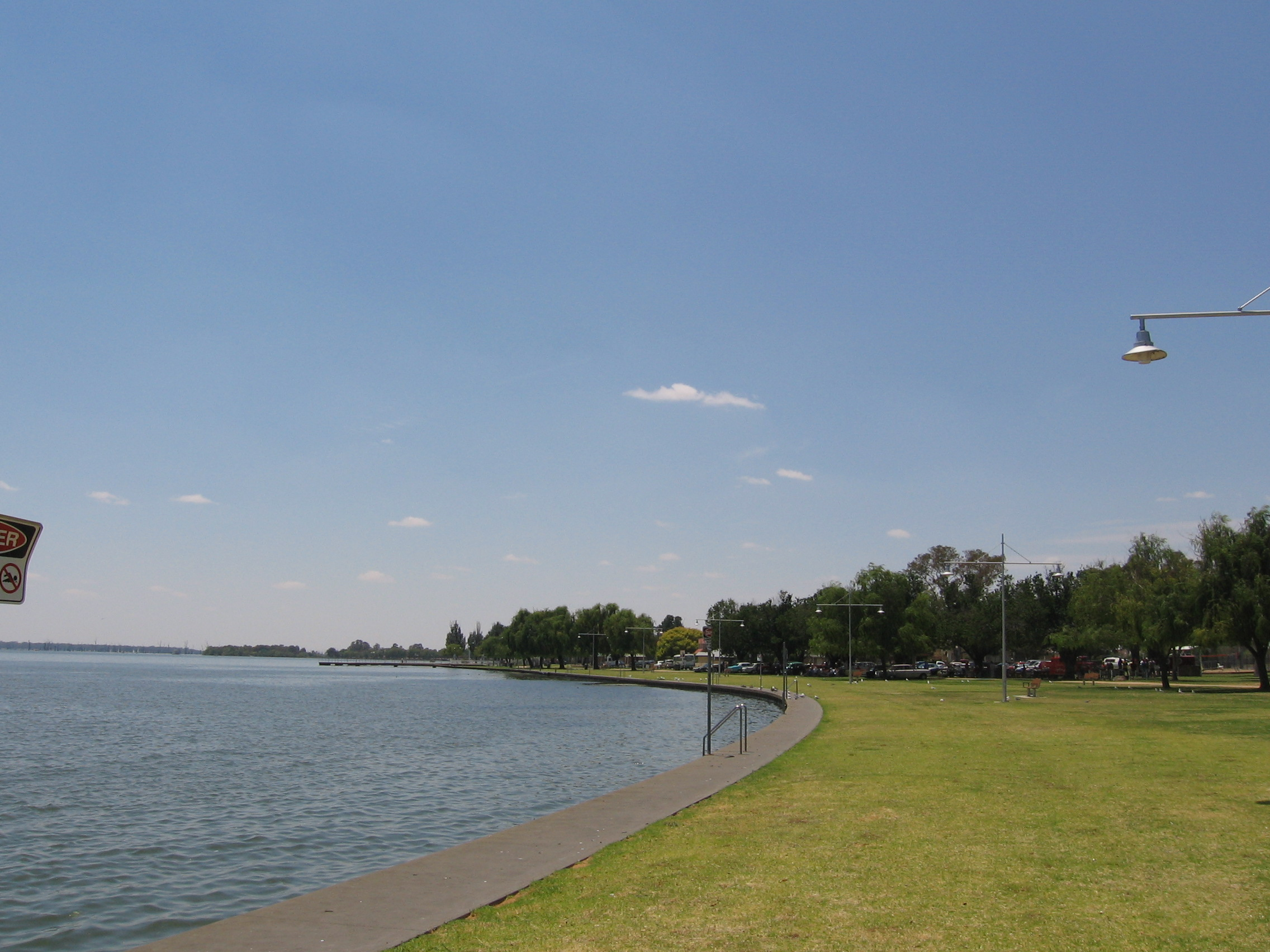
Foreshore of Lake Mulwala at Yarrawonga

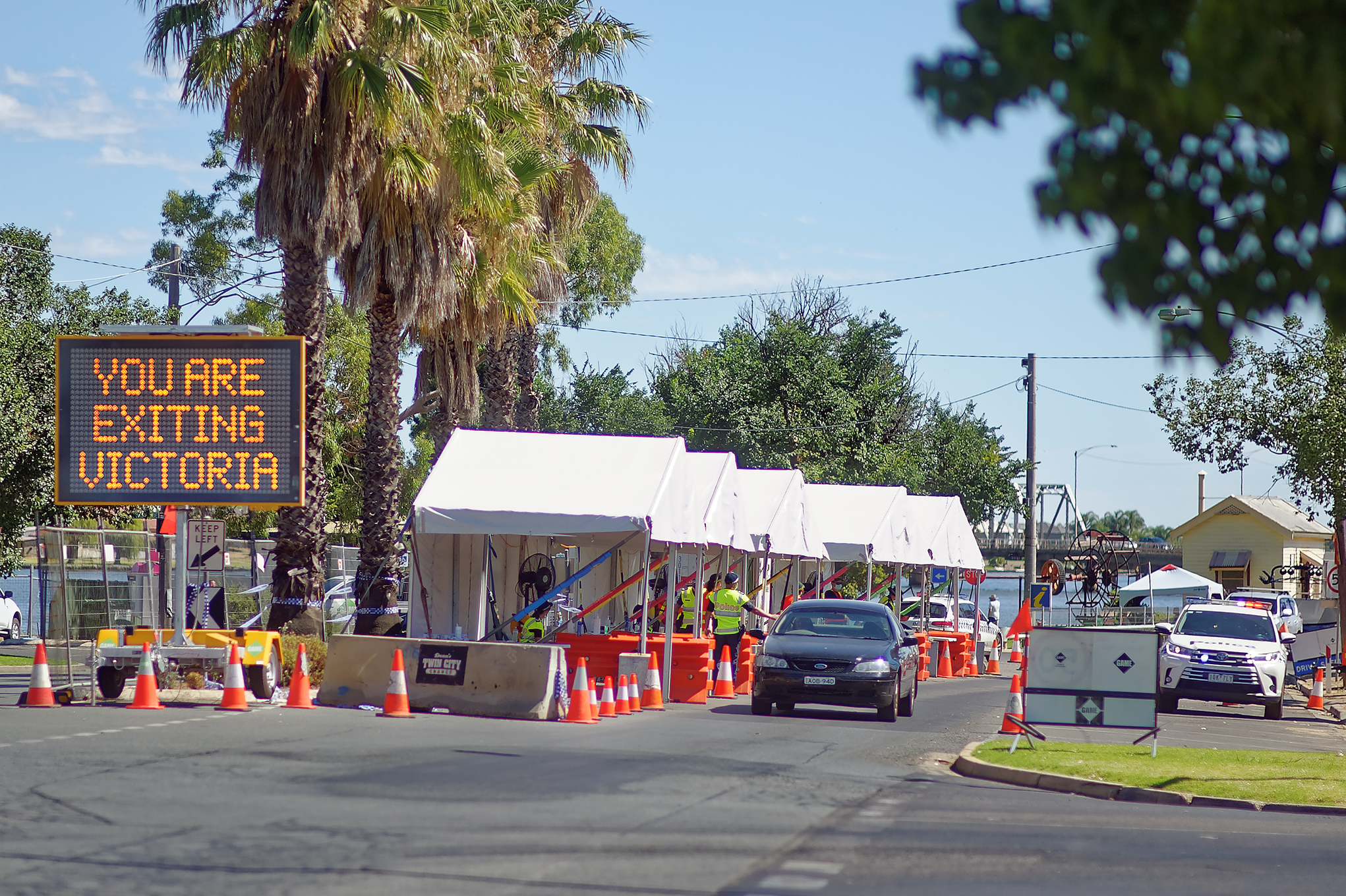
COVID-19 Victorian Border Checkpoint at Yarrawonga in January 2021

== Notable people ==
- Anne Curtis, actress, TV host personality

== See also ==
- Yarrawonga Airport
