= County of Moira =

Coordinates: 36°25′S 145°40′E

Moira
- Cadastral division
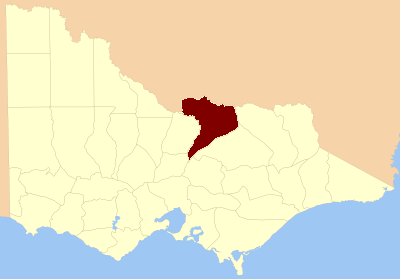
- Location in Victoria
- Country: Australia
- State: Victoria
- Established: 24 February 1871

Area
  - Total: 8,039 km^{2} (3,104 sq mi)
Lands administrative divisions around Moira
Cadell (NSW)	Townsend (NSW)	Denison (NSW)
Rodney	Moira	Bogong
Dalhousie	Delatite	Delatite

The County of Moira is one of the 37 counties of Victoria which are part of the cadastral divisions of Australia, used for land titles. It is located to the east of the Goulburn River, south of the Murray River, and west of part of the Ovens River. Part of Wangaratta is in the county, on the eastern end of it. It also includes Shepparton. The Shire of Moira is in a similar area.

== Parishes ==
Parishes within the county:

- Arcadia, Victoria
- Avenel, Victoria
- Balmattum, Victoria
- Barmah, Victoria
- Barwo, Victoria
- Baulkamaugh, Victoria
- Benalla, Victoria
- Boomahnoomoonah, Victoria
- Boosey, Victoria
- Boweya, Victoria
- Branjee, Victoria
- Bundalong, Victoria
- Bunganail, Victoria
- Bungeet, Victoria
- Burramine, Victoria
- Caniambo, Victoria
- Cobram, Victoria
- Cocomah, Victoria
- Congupna, Victoria
- Currawa, Victoria
- Dargalong, Victoria
- Devenish, Victoria
- Dookie, Victoria
- Drumanure, Victoria
- Dunbulbalane, Victoria
- Euroa, Victoria
- Glenrowen, Victoria
- Goomalibee, Victoria
- Goorambat, Victoria
- Gowangardie, Victoria
- Kaarimba, Victoria
- Karrabumet, Victoria
- Karramomus, Victoria
- Katamatite, Victoria
- Katandra, Victoria
- Katunga, Victoria
- Kialla, Victoria
- Killawarra, Victoria
- Kotupna, Victoria
- Longwood, Victoria
- Miepoll, Victoria
- Moglonemby, Victoria
- Moira, Victoria
- Mokoan, Victoria
- Molka, Victoria
- Monea North, Victoria
- Mundoona, Victoria
- Naringaningalook, Victoria
- Narioka, Victoria
- Peechelba, Victoria
- Pelluebla, Victoria
- Picola, Victoria
- Pine Lodge, Victoria
- Pranjip, Victoria
- Shadforth, Victoria
- Shepparton, Victoria
- St James, Victoria
- Stewarton, Victoria
- Strathmerton, Victoria
- Tabilk, Victoria
- Tallygaroopna, Victoria
- Taminick, Victoria
- Tamleugh, Victoria
- Tharanbegga, Victoria
- Ulupna, Victoria
- Upotipotpon, Victoria
- Waaia, Victoria
- Waggarandall, Victoria
- Wahring, Victoria
- Wangaratta South, Victoria
- Warrenbayne, Victoria
- Wills, Victoria
- Winton, Victoria
- Wormangal, Victoria
- Yabba Yabba, Victoria
- Yalca, Victoria
- Yarrawonga, Victoria
- Yarroweyah, Victoria
- Yielima, Victoria
- Youanmite, Victoria
- Youarang, Victoria
