= Yabba North =

- Town
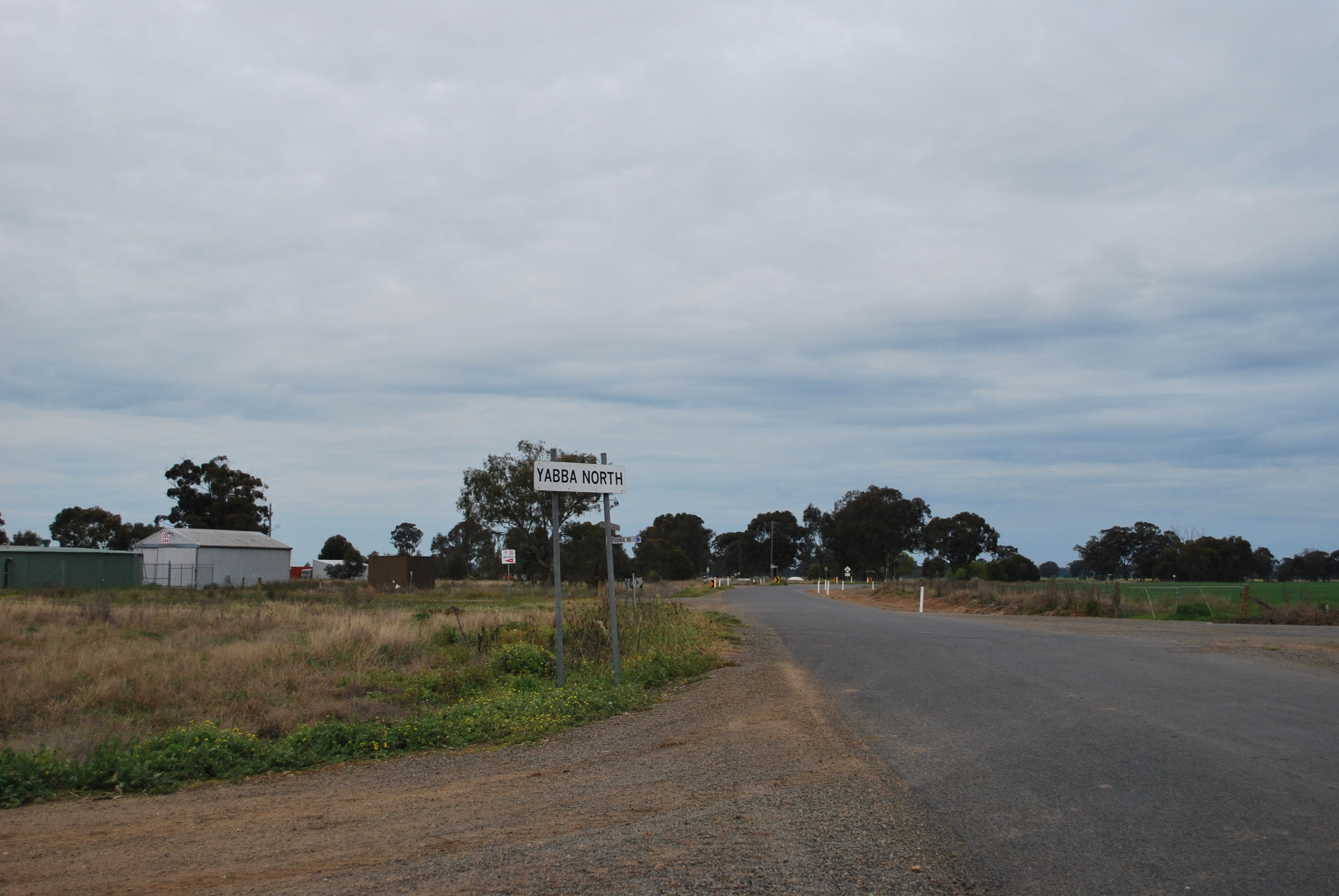
- Entering Yabba North

- Coordinates: 36°12′59″S 145°41′23″E
- Country: Australia
- State: Victoria
- Region: Hume
- LGA: Shire of Moira

Government
  - State electorate: Ovens Valley
  - Federal division: Nicholls

Population
  - Total: 104 (SAL 2021)
- Postcode: 3646
Localities around Yabba North
Invergordon	Youanmite	Youanmite
Katandra	Yabba North	Waggarandall
Katandra	Yabba South	Waggarandall

Yabba North is a locality in northern Victoria, Australia. The locality is the Shire of Moira local government area. At the 2011 census, Yabba North and the surrounding area had a population of 256. The population had dropped to 104 at the 2021 census.

It has a disused railway—the "Katamatite Tramway"—running through the locality. Yabba North post office opened in August 1901 and was closed on 4 February 1956.

== Yabba Football Club ==
The Yabba North Football Club was established in 1912, with the colours of green and gold, with maroon stockings.

The Yabba North Football Club won the Dookie Football Association premiership in 1922, defeating Cosgrove at the Dookie Football Oval.

The Yabba Football Club won the Dookie Football Association premiership in 1923, defeating Dookie, at the Dookie Football Oval.

The Yabba Football Club won the Dookie Football Association premiership in 1924, defeating Dookie, at the Katamatite Football Oval.

The Yabba Football Club won the 1927 Dookie Katamatite Football Association premiership.

The Yabba Football Club were defeated in the 1928 Katandra District Football Association by Drumanure Football Club at the Katamatite Football Ground.

The Yabba Football Club won the 1930 Katandra District Football Association premiership, defeating Muckatah at Katamatite.

The Yabba Football Club won the 1931 Katandra District Football Association premiership, defeating Numurkah Imperials.

The Yabba Football Club won the 1932 Katandra District Football Association premiership, defeating Drumanure, at Katamatite.

The Yabba – Dookie Football Club won the 1933 Benalla Mulwala Football League, defeating Wilby at St. James.
