= Yabba South =

- Town
- Coordinates: 36°16′48″S 145°40′54″E
- Country: Australia
- State: Victoria
- Region: Hume
- LGA: Shire of Moira

Government
  - State electorate: Ovens Valley
  - Federal division: Nicholls

Population
  - Total: 32 (SAL 2021)
- Postcode: 3646
Localities around Yabba South
Katandra	Yabba North	Waggarandall
Katandra	Yabba South	Waggarandall
Cosgrove	Dookie	Dookie

Yabba South is a locality in Victoria, Australia. The locality is in the southern part of the Shire of Moira. The former Katamatite Tramway ran through Yabba South.

Yabba post office opened in 1902 and was closed on 15 March 1908.

== Demographics ==
At the 2016 census the population of Yabba South was 27. It had increased to 32 at the 2021 census.
