= Katamatite railway line =

Former railway in Victoria, Australia

The Katamatite railway line is a disused railway located in northern Victoria, Australia. It was built as a tramway, running from Dookie to Katamatite, and opened on 11 August 1890. Two years later it was taken over by the Victorian Railways (VR) and sections of the track were upgraded allowing its reclassification as a railway. The line was formally closed on 13 January 1987.

== Background ==
The Parliament of Victoria passed the Tramways in Country Districts Act 1886 (50 Vict. No. 915), which allowed local governments in country areas to construct tramways, with financial assistance from the Victorian government, to a limit of £2,000 a mile. Money was to be provided to councils through the Country Tramways Trust Fund, which was in turn part of the budget allocation to the VR. Ultimately, local ratepayers bore the burden of repaying the loans.

== Construction ==
On 11 August 1890, the Yarrawonga Shire Council was successful in obtaining money for the construction of a tramway running north from the town of Dookie, where it connected with an existing railway line from Shepparton, to the town of Katamatite. Yarrawonga (later Tungamah Shire Council, now Moira Shire Council), appointed Thomas Walker Fowler as chief engineer for the construction and operation of the tramway. The intention was that the shire would build and operate the line, with some supervision from the VR.

Fowler had arrived in Australia from Ireland in 1876, and gained a degree in engineering from Melbourne University. He worked with the Victorian and New South Wales railways departments for a short time before entering private practice, being employed by a number of councils around Victoria. After working on the Katamatite line he went on to design water and electricity supply systems for a number of Victorian country towns.

The tramway was constructed using the same sleepers as those used by the VR, but only 10 miles (16 km) of the track used the same weight rails, the remainder being laid with a lighter 50 pounds per yard (25 kg/m) steel rail. The formation of the track itself was narrower than that used by the VR, being 12 ft 6 in (3.81 m) wide as compared to 15 ft 6 in (4.72 m). The lighter construction, which included using less track ballast, imposed restrictions on the weight of rolling stock used on the line and the speed at which it was allowed to travel, which was initially limited to 20 mph (32 km/h). The steepest gradient was calculated to be 1 in 69, and the largest bridge, where the line crossed Broken Creek, was 200 feet (61 m) long.

The line had four stations, Yabba South, Yabba North, Youanmite and Katamatite, spaced approximately 4 miles (6.4 km) apart. Each was able to handle passengers, agricultural produce, including wheat, and light freight.

With a total length of nearly 17 miles (27 km), the cost of the project was £31,624, excluding general expenses. An 1890 report to the Victorian Parliament by the VR District Traffic Superintendent for the Shepparton and Dookie area stated that the quality of construction was generally 'good' and that trains on it ran 'very steadily', but it was noted that there were drainage problems in some places, particularly near Dookie.

== Locomotives and rolling stock ==
In 1890, the Yarrawonga Council purchased one locomotive, one carriage and six trucks from the Victorian Government for use on the line. The engine had originally been the first one bought by the VR and, with the number 12, with its V-Class fleet. It had been built in a 2-2-2 configuration, but was converted to a 2-4-0 in 1871. When the tramway changed hands in 1892 the locomotive was renumbered 528 by the VR, and remained in service on the Katamatite line until 1904, when it was sold to a contractor in South Australia. Following the VR takeover standard rolling stock, albeit lighter steam and diesel powered locomotives, were used on the line until closure.

== Subsequent concerns ==
The Yarrawonga Council ended its management of the tramway in August 1892, having lobbied the Victorian Government to take over the line, to relieve the council of the burden of debt and the loss that was being incurred. There was some indication of poor financial management on the part of the council, but a local meeting of ratepayers supported it in the final decision to sell.

The tramway was reclassified as a railway when it came under the control of the VR. In 1905 the line was extended by several chains to allow for shunting at Katamatite, but that also brought to a head an argument that was to continue for another decade. At Katamatite the track ended almost 1 mile (1.6 km) south of the town centre, possibly to save money by avoiding the need for a bridge over Boosey Creek. Lobbying for an extension was ongoing, and in 1912 it was pointed out to the Minister for Railways that, due to swampy conditions near the Katamatite station, access was almost impossible during winter. The advocates received an unsympathetic response and the extension never eventuated.

In 1926 meetings were held in the district centre in support of a proposed link between the Katamatite line and the Benalla to Yarrawonga railway to the east. It was hoped that such an extension would open up more markets for local produce and reduce transport times to Sydney. Ultimately, like similar proposals before it in 1909 and 1916, it was rejected on the grounds of costs versus revenue.

== Fate of the line ==
Other than Yabba South, stations on the line were eventually provided with bulk grain silos. A 53-foot (16 m) turntable was installed at Katamatite in 1914, which was removed in the late 1940s.

Owing to road competition, rail services gradually declined. The last passenger train ran in April 1953, and in the last decade before closure, the line was only used as required for transporting grain. Yabba South station closed in March 1969. All the others closed with the line in 1987. One of the last locomotives to be used on the line was diesel-electric locomotive Y129.

The right-of-way is still visible in some places, and at Youanmite the rails can be seen where they cross a dirt road. The silos at the former stations still stand, and around them are the remains of old sleepers and ballast. A 5 km section from Dookie to Yabba South has become a rail trail for tourists visiting the area, with future extensions planned.

Due to consistently large harvests in 2018, 2019 and 2020, substantial grain volumes were received at the Dookie silos, leading to some interest in the media about reconnecting the line at Shepparton for the transport of grain.
