= List of places on the Victorian Heritage Register in the Shire of Moira =

This is a list of places on the Victorian Heritage Register in the Shire of Moira in Victoria, Australia. The Victorian Heritage Register is maintained by the Heritage Council of Victoria.

The Victorian Heritage Register, as of 2026, lists the following eight state-registered places within the Shire of Moira:

Place name	Place #	Location	Suburb or Town	Co-ordinates	Built	State registered	Photo
Barmah Muster Yards	VHR H2212	Barmah State Forest, Sand Ridge Track	Barmah	35.960500°S 144.967472°E	1880	11 June 2009	
Barmah Punt	VHR H2164	Jack Edwards Park, Murray Street	Barmah	36.018502°S 144.956338°E	1929	10 July 2008	
Byramine Homestead	VHR H0370	1436 Murray Valley Highway	Burramine	35.985707°S 145.859217°E	c. 1850s	9 October 1974	
Coonanga Homestead	VHR H0329	575 Bearii-Mywee Road	Strathmerton	35.872916°S 145.405193°E	1873	9 October 1974	
Mechanics Institute	VHR H0518	27-29 Carlisle Street	Wunghnu	36.153503°S 145.432000°E	1887	18 November 1981	
Numurkah Court House	VHR H1479	43 Melville Street	Numurkah	36.089944°S 145.442639°E	1888	20 August 1982	
Old Cobram-Barooga Bridge	VHR H2352	Barooga Road	Cobram	35.916081°S 145.669418°E	1902	11 February 2016	
Yarrawonga Court House	VHR H1655	12 Piper Street	Yarrawonga	36.010919°S 146.002295°E	1887	20 August 1982	
Yarrawonga Shire Hall	VHR H2429	100 Belmore Street	Yarrawonga	36.012760°S 146.005280°E	1930	8 December 2022	
