= Yundool =

- Town
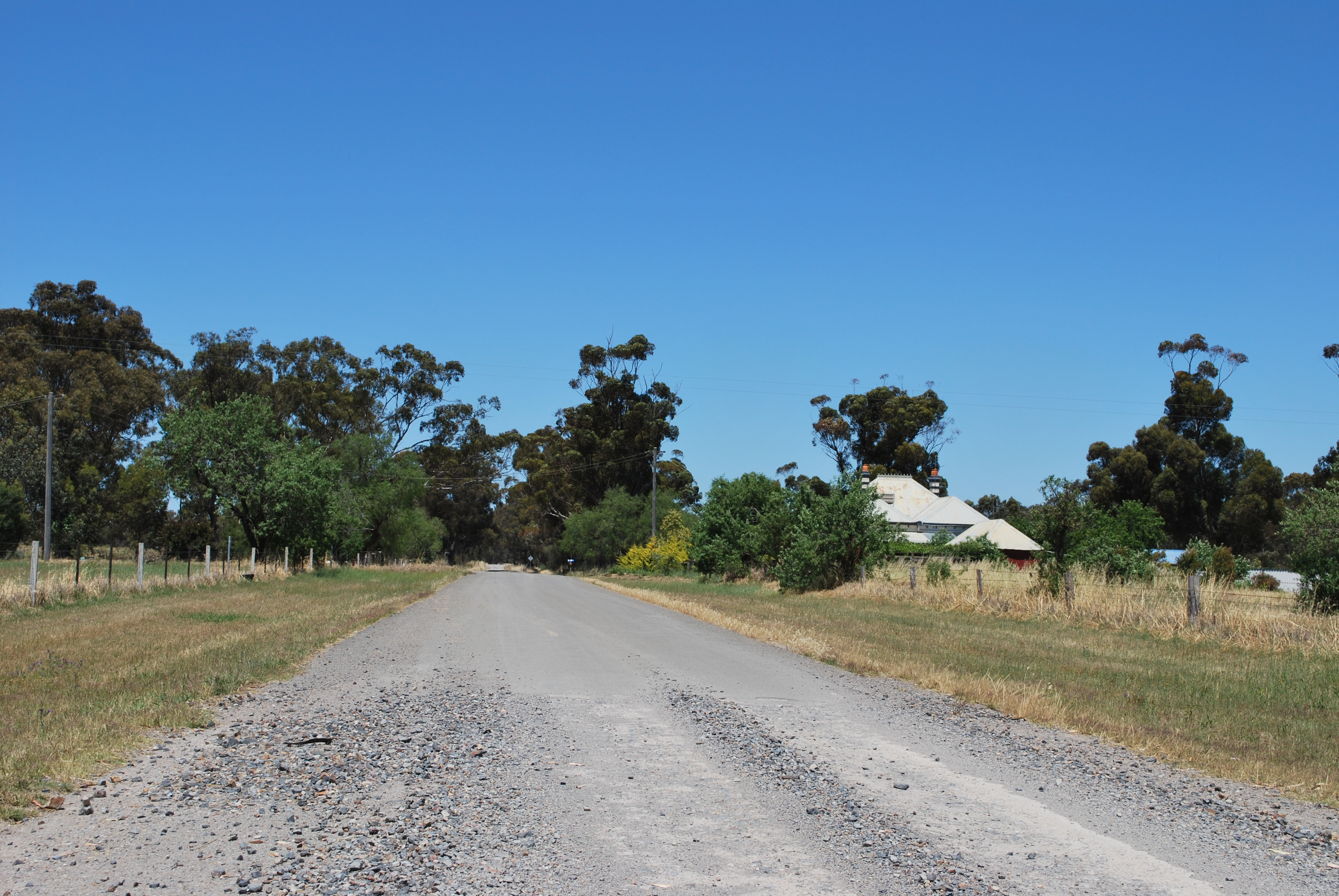
- Yundool Road

- Coordinates: 36°15′59″S 145°48′58″E
- Country: Australia
- State: Victoria
- Region: Hume
- LGA: Shire of Moira

Government
  - State electorate: Ovens Valley
  - Federal division: Nicholls

Population
  - Total: 44 (2016 census)
- Postcode: 3727
Localities around Yundool
Waggarandall	Waggarandall	St James
Waggarandall	Yundool	St James
Dookie	Boxwood	Devenish

Yundool is a locality in northern Victoria, Australia in the local government area of Shire of Moira.

Yundool post office opened on 15 November 1886, closed on 4 April 1912, reopened on 27 October 1913 and was closed on 26 April 1985.
