= List of acts of the Parliament of Victoria from 1901 =

This is a list of acts of the Parliament of Victoria, Australia for the year 1901.

== 1901 ==
| Short title, or popular name | Citation | Royal assent |
Long title
| Constitution Act Amendment Act 1900 (Note: Although passed in the year 1900, and given a short title ending '...Act 1900', the need to obtain approval for this act from the United Kingdom meant it was not proclaimed until the year 1901.) (repealed) | 1 Edw. VII. No. 1723 | 16 May 1901 (Note: This act was reserved for approval by His Majesty.) |
An Act relating to Members of the Federal Parliament of the Commonwealth of Australia. (Repealed by Constitution Act Amendment Act 1915 (6 Geo. V. No. 2632))
| | 1 Edw. VII. No. 1724 | 28 June 1901 |
An Act to apply out of the Consolidated Revenue the sum of Four hundred and eighty-six thousand and thirty-fve pounds to the service of the year One thousand nine hundred and One thousand nine hundred and one.
| Governor's Salary Further Reduction Act 1900 (repealed) | 1 Edw. VII. No. 1725 | 12 July 1901 |
An Act to reduce the sum appropriated for the payment of the Governor's Salary. (Repealed by Constitution Act Amendment Act 1915 (6 Geo. V. No. 2632))
| | 1 Edw. VII. No. 1726 | 31 July 1901 |
An Act to apply out of the Consolidated Revenue the sum of Six hundred and four thousand and eighty-fve pounds to the service of the year One thousand nine hundred and one and One thousand nine hundred and two.
| Melbourne and Metropolitan Board of Works Act 1901 (repealed) | 1 Edw. VII. No. 1727 | 29 August 1901 |
An Act to authorize and validate certain Expenditure by the Melbourne and Metropolitan Board of Works in connexion with the mourning for the Death of Her late Majesty the Opening of the Parliament of the Commonwealth and the Visit of Their Royal Highnesses the Duke and Duchess of Cornwall and York. (Repealed by Melbourne and Metropolitan Board of Works Act 1915 (6 Geo. V. No. 2696))
| Mallee Tanks Act 1901 | 1 Edw. VII. No. 1728 | 29 August 1901 |
An Act to further amend the Mallee Tanks Act 1895. (Note: Mallee Tanks Act 1895 (58 Vict. No. 1378))
| Grazing Area Leases Extension Act 1901 | 1 Edw. VII. No. 1729 | 29 August 1901 |
An Act relating to certain Grazing Area Leases.
| Municipalities' Advances Act 1901 | 1 Edw. VII. No. 1730 | 29 August 1901 |
An Act to amend the Municipalities' Advances Acts.
| | 1 Edw. VII. No. 1731 | 29 August 1901 |
An Act to apply out of the Consolidated Revenue the sum of One million and eighty-three thousand eight hundred and one pounds to the service of the year One thousand nine hundred and one and One thousand nine hundred and two.
| Moorpanyal Land Act 1901 | 1 Edw. VII. No. 1732 | 29 August 1901 |
An Act to further amend the Moorpanyal Land Act 1897. (Note: Moorpanyal Land Act 1897 (61 Vict. No. 1507))
| Old-age Pensions Act 1901 (Note: Two acts, No. 1733 and No. 1751, share the short title Old-age Pensions Act 1901.) | 1 Edw. VII. No. 1733 | 27 September 1901 |
An Act to further provide for the Payment of Old-age Pensions.
| Municipalities Commonwealth Celebrations Act 1901 | 1 Edw. VII. No. 1734 | 8 October 1901 |
An Act to authorize and validate certain Expenditure by the Councils of various Municipalities in connexion with the Mourning for the Death of Her late Majesty Queen Victoria or in Commemoration of Her Reign and in the Opening of the Parliament of the Commonwealth and the Visit of Their Royal Highnesses the Duke and Duchess of Cornwall and York and towards the Cost of Celebrating and Commemorating the Services rendered by Imperial and Colonial Soldiers in South Africa and China.
| Eurack Estate Purchase Act 1901 | 1 Edw. VII. No. 1735 | 8 October 1901 |
An Act to sanction the acquisition by the State of certain land in the County of Grenville known as the Eurack Estate.
| Dookie and Katamatite Tramway Act 1901 | 1 Edw. VII. No. 1736 | 8 October 1901 |
An Act to amend the Dookie and Katamatite Tramway Act 1897. (Note: Dookie and Katamatite Tramway Act 1897 (No. 1529))
| Marriage Act 1901 (repealed) | 1 Edw. VII. No. 1737 | 8 October 1901 |
An Act to further amend the Marriage Act 1890. (Note: Marriage Act 1890 (54 Vict. No. 1166)) (Repealed by Marriage Act 1915 (6 Geo. V. No. 2691))
| Wangaratta Lands Act 1901 (repealed) | 1 Edw. VII. No. 1738 | 8 October 1901 |
An Act for the purpose of altering the reservation of the Wangaratta Town Hall Site so far as that reservation relates to Athenæum (Note: 'Athenaeum' was a term used at the time for libraries.) purposes. (Repealed by Statute Law Revision Act 1984 (No. 10087))
| Mooroopna Race-course Land Act 1901 | 1 Edw. VII. No. 1739 | 8 October 1901 |
An Act to authorize the Sale of the Mooroopna Race-course Reserve and for other purposes.
| Hawthorn Loan Act 1901 | 1 Edw. VII. No. 1740 | 6 November 1901 |
An Act to authorize the City of Hawthorn to construct and provide certain permanent Works and Undertakings in lieu of certain other permanent Works and Undertakings.
| Wild Dogs Act 1901 (repealed) | 1 Edw. VII. No. 1741 | 6 November 1901 |
An Act relating to the Destruction of Wild Dogs. (Repealed by Vermin Destruction Act 1915 (6 Geo. V. No. 2745))
| Mining Development Act 1901 (repealed) | 1 Edw. VII. No. 1742 | 6 November 1901 |
An Act to amend the Mining Development Acts. (Repealed by Mining Development Act 1915 (6 Geo. V. No. 2699))
| Pompapiel Lands Act 1901 | 1 Edw. VII. No. 1743 | 6 November 1901 |
An Act to provide for the resumption by the Crown of certain Land in the County of Bendigo Parish of Pompapiel.
| | 1 Edw. VII. No. 1744 | 27 November 1901 |
An Act to apply out of the Consolidated Revenue the sum of Three hundred and fifty-six thousand five hundred and seventy-nine pounds to the service of the year One thousand nine hundred and one and One thousand nine hundred and two.
| Port Melbourne Loan Act 1901 | 1 Edw. VII. No. 1745 | 5 December 1901 |
An Act to authorize the Town of Port Melbourne to construct certain permanent Works and Undertakings in lieu of certain other permanent Works and Undertakings.
| Bendigo Land Sale Act 1901 | 1 Edw. VII. No. 1746 | 5 December 1901 |
An Act to provide for the Sale of certain Land in the City of Bendigo.
| Queenscliff Market Land Act 1901 | 1 Edw. VII. No. 1747 | 5 December 1901 |
An Act to provide for the Resumption by the Crown of certain Land in the County of Grant Municipal District of Queenscliff.
| Warrnambool Land Act 1901 | 1 Edw. VII. No. 1748 | 5 December 1901 |
An Act to revoke the Permanent Reservation of certain Land in the Town of Warrnambool.
| Land Act 1901 (repealed) | 1 Edw. VII. No. 1749 | 5 December 1901 |
An Act to consolidate the Laws relating to the Sale and Occupation of Crown Lands. (Repealed by Land Act 1915 (6 Geo. V. No. 2676))
| Trading Stamps Act 1901 (repealed) | 1 Edw. VII. No. 1750 | 5 December 1901 |
An Act to prevent the use of Trading Stamps or Coupons. (Repealed by Goods Act 1915 (6 Geo. V. No. 2663))
| Old-age Pensions Act 1901 | 1 Edw. VII. No. 1751 | 11 December 1901 |
An Act to provide for the Payment of Old-age Pensions and for other purposes.
| Treasury Bonds Act 1901 | 1 Edw. VII. No. 1752 | 23 December 1901 |
An Act to further amend the Treasury Bonds Act 1898. (Note: Treasury Bonds Act 1898 (62 Vict. No. 1574))
| Railway Loan Act 1901 | 1 Edw. VII. No. 1753 | 23 December 1901 |
An Act to authorize the Raising of Money for Railways and for other purposes.
| Surplus Revenue Act 1901 | 1 Edw. VII. No. 1754 | 23 December 1901 |
An Act relating to the Surplus Revenue of the Financial Year ended on the thirtieth day of June One thousand nine hundred and one.
| Water Supply Loans Application Act 1901 | 1 Edw. VII. No. 1755 | 23 December 1901 |
An Act to sanction the issue and application of certain sums of money for Water Supply in Country Districts.
| Municipal Overdrafts (Indemnity) Act 1901 | 1 Edw. VII. No. 1756 | 23 December 1901 |
An Act to indemnify the Councillors of various Municipalities for Borrowing Moneys by Overdrafts on Bankers for the purposes of their Municipalities contrary to the provisions of the Local Government Act 1890. (Note: Local Government Act 1890 (54 Vict. No. 1112))
| Employers and Employés Act 1890 Continuance Act 1901 or the Employers and Employees Act 1890 Continuance Act 1901 (repealed) | 1 Edw. VII. No. 1757 | 23 December 1901 |
An Act to further continue in force Part III. of the Employers and Employés Act 1890. (Note: Employers and Employés Act 1890 (54 Vict. No. 1087)) (Repealed by Employers and Employés Act 1915 (6 Geo. V. No. 2646))
| Income Tax Rate Act 1901 (repealed) | 1 Edw. VII. No. 1758 | 23 December 1901 |
An Act to declare the Rates of Income Tax for the Year ending on the thirty-first day of December One thousand nine hundred and two. (Repealed by Income Tax Act 1915 (6 Geo. V. No. 2668))
| Coleraine Race-course Act 1901 (repealed) | 1 Edw. VII. No. 1759 | 23 December 1901 |
An Act to provide for the Exchange of Portion of the Coleraine Race-course Reserve for certain adjoining Land. (Repealed by Statute Law Revision Act 1984 (No. 10087))
| Colac and Beech Forest Railway Amendment Act 1901 | 1 Edw. VII. No. 1760 | 23 December 1901 |
An Act to amend the Colac and Beech Forest Railway Construction Act 1898. (Note: Colac and Beech Forest Railway Construction Act 1898 (No. 1594))
| Old-age Pensions Act 1900 further Amendment Act 1901 | 1 Edw. VII. No. 1761 | 23 December 1901 |
An Act to further amend the Old-age Pensions Act 1900. (Note: Old-age Pensions Act 1900 (No. 1706))
| Acting Victorian Railways Commissioner Act 1901 | 1 Edw. VII. No. 1762 | 23 December 1901 |
An Act to provide for the further Appointment of an Acting Victorian Railways Commissioner.
| Spring Vale General Cemetery Railway Act 1901 | 1 Edw. VII. No. 1763 | 23 December 1901 |
An Act to authorize the construction by the State of a Line of Railway from the Gippsland Railway near Spring Vale to the Spring Vale Cemetery.
| Tramways Act 1901 | 1 Edw. VII. No. 1764 | 23 December 1901 |
An Act to extend the provisions of the Tramways Act 1890 (Note: Tramways Act 1890 (54 Vict. No. 1148)) to the Municipality of Saint Kilda within certain limits.
| Sports Betting Suppression Act 1901 (repealed) | 1 Edw. VII. No. 1765 | 23 December 1901 |
An Act for the Suppression of Betting at Sports Meetings. (Repealed by Police Offences Act 1912 (3 Geo. V. No. 2422))
| Railway Loan Application Act 1901 | 1 Edw. VII. No. 1766 | 23 December 1901 |
An Act to authorize the Expenditure of certain sums of Money available under Loan Acts for Railways.
| Public Works Loan Application Act 1901 | 1 Edw. VII. No. 1767 | 23 December 1901 |
An Act to authorize certain Expenditure out of Money available under Loan Acts for Public Works and other purposes.
| Audit Act 1901 (repealed) | 1 Edw. VII. No. 1768 | 23 December 1901 |
An Act to amend the Audit Acts. (Repealed by Audit Act 1915 (6 Geo. V. No. 2516))
| Trusts Act 1901 | 1 Edw. VII. No. 1769 | 23 December 1901 |
An Act to amend the Trusts Act 1890 (Note: Trusts Act 1890 (54 Vict. No. 1150)) and for other purposes.
| Vermin Destruction Act 1901 (repealed) | 1 Edw. VII. No. 1770 | 23 December 1901 |
An Act relating to the Vermin Destruction Act 1890. (Note: Vermin Destruction Act 1890 (54 Vict. No. 1153)) (Repealed by Vermin Destruction Act 1915 (6 Geo. V. No. 2745))
| Marine Act 1901 (repealed) | 1 Edw. VII. No. 1771 | 23 December 1901 |
An Act to further amend the Marine Act 1890. (Note: Marine Act 1890 (54 Vict. No. 1165)) (Repealed by Marine Act 1915 (6 Geo. V. No. 2688))
| Melbourne Sailors' Home Act 1901 | 1 Edw. VII. No. 1772 | 23 December 1901 |
An Act to enable the Trustees of the Melbourne Sailors' Home to sell and convey certain Land situate in the City of Melbourne and vested in such Trustees as a Site for a Sailors' Home and to acquire other Land therefor and for other purposes.
| Vegetation Diseases Act 1901 (repealed) | 1 Edw. VII. No. 1773 | 23 December 1901 |
An Act to amend the Vegetation Diseases Act 1896. (Note: Vegetation Diseases Act 1896 (59 Vict. No. 1432)) (Repealed by Vegetation and Vine Diseases Act 1915 (6 Geo. V. No. 2744))
| Meat Supervision Act 1901 (repealed) | 1 Edw. VII. No. 1774 | 23 December 1901 |
An Act to amend the Meat Supervision Act 1900. (Note: Meat Supervision Act 1900 (63 Vict. No. 1652)) (Repealed by Meat Supervision Act 1915 (6 Geo. V. No. 2694))
| Electric Light and Power Act 1901 (repealed) | 1 Edw. VII. No. 1775 | 23 December 1901 |
An Act to amend the Electric Light and Power Act 1900 (Note: Electric Light and Power Act 1900 (64 Vict. No. 1694)) and for other Purposes. (Repealed by Electric Light and Power Act 1915 (6 Geo. V. No. 2645))
| | 1 Edw. VII. No. 1776 | 23 December 1901 |
An Act to apply a sum out of the Consolidated Revenue to the service of the year ending on the thirtieth day of June One thousand nine hundred and two and to appropriate the Supplies granted in this Session of Parliament.
| Education Act 1901 (repealed) | 1 Edw. VII. No. 1777 | 23 December 1901 |
An Act to amend the Education Act 1890. (Note: Education Act 1890 (54 Vict. No. 1086)) (Repealed by Education Act 1915 (6 Geo. V. No. 2644))
| Savings Banks Act 1901 | 1 Edw. VII. No. 1778 | 23 December 1901 |
An Act to further amend the Savings Banks Acts.
| Public Service Act 1901 (repealed) | 1 Edw. VII. No. 1779 | 23 December 1901 |
An Act to amend the Public Service Acts. (Repealed by Public Service Act 1915 (6 Geo. V. No. 2713))
| Gold Buyers Act 1901 | 1 Edw. VII. No. 1780 | 23 December 1901 |
An Act to license Gold Buyers.
| Melbourne and Metropolitan Board of Works Act 1901 (No. 2) (repealed) | 1 Edw. VII. No. 1781 | 23 December 1901 |
An Act to amend the Melbourne and Metropolitan Board of Works Acts and for other purposes. (Repealed by Melbourne and Metropolitan Board of Works Act 1915 (6 Geo. V. No. 2696))

== Sources ==
- "1901 Victorian Historical Acts". AustLII.
