= Youanmite =

- Town
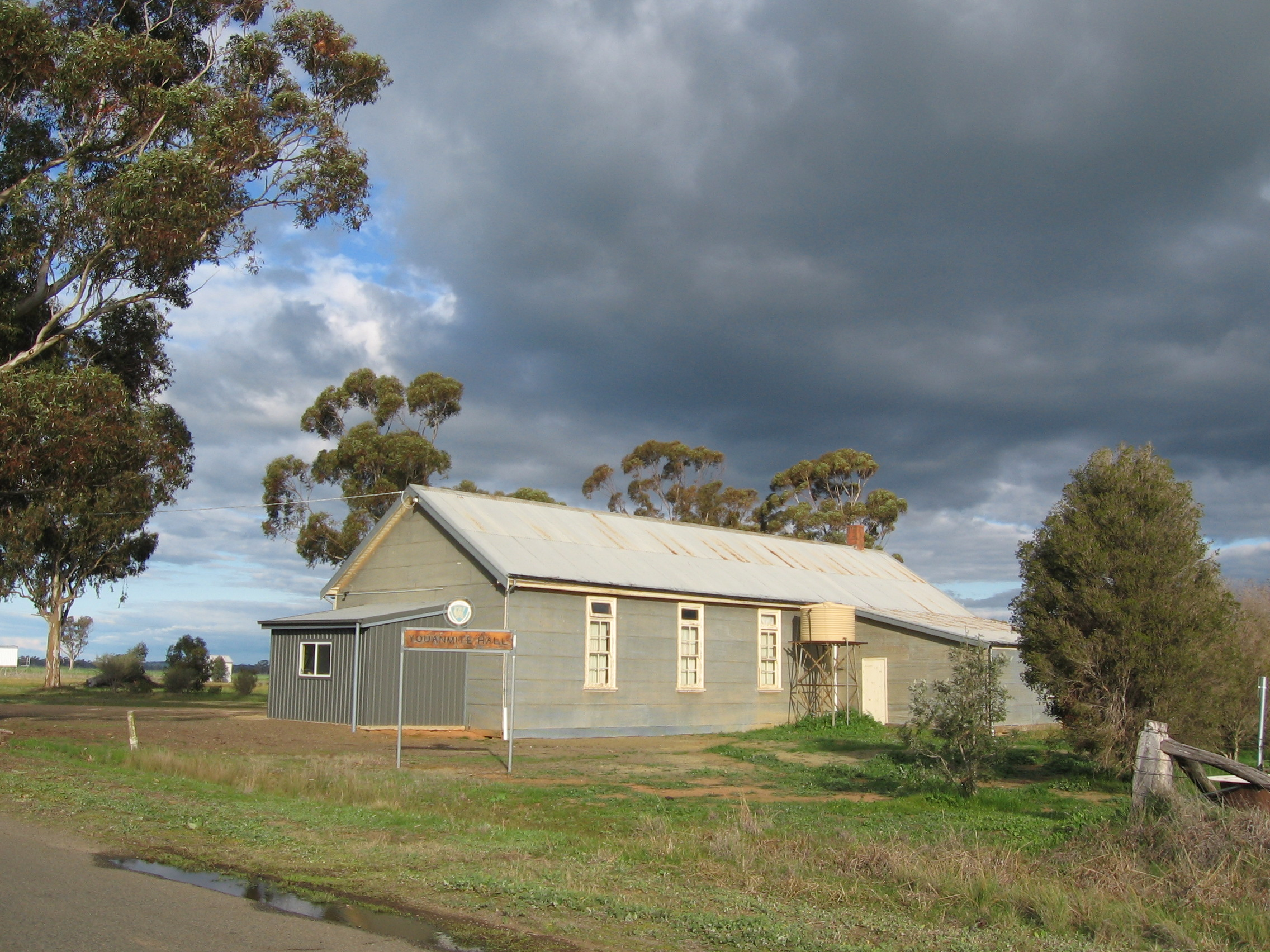
- The former town hall of Youanmite

- Coordinates: 36°09′24″S 145°41′30″E
- Country: Australia
- State: Victoria
- Region: Hume
- LGA: Shire of Moira

Government
  - State electorate: Ovens Valley
  - Federal division: Nicholls

Population
  - Total: 56 (SAL 2021)
- Postcode: 3646
Localities around Youanmite
Naring	Katamatite	Telford
Drumanure	Youanmite	Youarang
Invergordon	Yabba North	Waggarandall

Youanmite is a locality in the Shire of Moira. It is located near the intersection of Youanmite and Katamatite roads, approximately 25 km southwest of Yarrawonga and approximately 200 km northeast of Melbourne, Australia. Youanmite was once a small town having its own schools, churches, and post office. Comprising medium to large farms the area is predominantly agricultural, focusing on grain production as well as sheep and cattle grazing.

== Early years ==
The traditional owners of the land are the Yorta Yorta people who inhabited a large area south of the Murray River. It was not until 1824, when Hamilton Hume and William Hovell passed through the area on their expedition from New South Wales to Geelong in Victoria, that the land was assessed and opened for settlement. Squatters soon moved in and vast stations for wheat production and livestock grazing were quickly established. During the 1860s the Victorian Land Acts allowed for the subdivision of large holdings and a provision for Selectors to take up small allotments at minimal cost. This saw an increase in the population of the area and the need to establish more local facilities. Four schools had been established in the area prior to 1920 along with a hotel, sawmill and dairy.

The now disused Dookie to Katamatite railway, classed as a tramway for the first two years of its life, opened in 1882 carrying light freight, grain and passengers. A weighbridge and grain silo, which still exist, were built next to the rail line. Roberts General Store opened in 1894 and by the turn of the century churches had been created for the Methodist, Church of England and Roman Catholic congregations.

== Later years ==
In 1953 the railway passenger service was terminated and the line was formally closed in 1987. The line ran through the town, which had grown up around it, and the iron rails are visible where they cross Youanmite road as the line travels north. The former town hall still exists and is used occasionally by the local community.

The town post office opened on 8 August 1885. It was renamed Youanmite West on 11 April 1892 due to another office opening there on the same date as 'Youanmite'. 'Youanmate West' post office closed on 1 November 1893 and the 'Youanmite' post office closed on 31 July 1971.

== Places of interest ==
A conservation area was opened by Parks Victoria in 2004. Located close to the town center, it comprises over 100 hectares of land set aside to preserve the local flora and fauna.
