= List of acts of the Parliament of Victoria from 1897 =

This is a list of acts of the Parliament of Victoria, Australia for the year 1897.

== 1897 ==
Short title, or popular name	Citation	Royal assent
Long title
	61 Vict. No. 1483	30 June 1897
An Act to further continue in force a certain Rate of Postage.
	61 Vict. No. 1484	30 June 1897
An Act to apply out of the Consolidated Revenue the sum of One million two hundred thousand five hundred and ninety-two pounds to the service of the year One thousand eight hundred and ninety-seven and ninety-eight.
Special and Other Appropriations Retrenchment Limitation Act 1896 (Note: Although passed in the year 1896, and given a short title ending '...Act 1896', the need to obtain approval for this act from the United Kingdom meant it was not proclaimed until the year 1897.)	61 Vict. No. 1485	16 July 1897 (Note: This act was reserved for approval by Her Majesty.)
An Act providing for the continuance in force for certain limited times of the Rates of Reductions of Salaries provided for in the Special and other Appropriations Retrenchment Act 1893. (Note: Special and other Appropriations Retrenchment Act 1893 (58 Vict. No. 1359))
Local Government Act 1897	61 Vict. No. 1486	6 August 1897
An Act for the purpose of applying certain provisions of the Local Government Acts to the City of Melbourne and the Town of Geelong.
Mining Development Act 1897 (repealed)	61 Vict. No. 1487	6 August 1897
An Act to amend the Mining Development Act 1896. (Note: Mining Development Act 1896 (60 Vict. No. 1461)) (Repealed by Mining Development Act 1915 (6 Geo. V. No. 2699))
	61 Vict. No. 1488	6 August 1897
An Act to amend the Companies Act 1896. (Note: Companies Act 1896 (60 Vict. No. 1482))
Servants' Registry Offices Act 1897 (repealed)	61 Vict. No. 1489	17 August 1897
An Act for the regulation of Servants' Registry Offices. (Repealed by Servants' Registry Offices Act 1915 (6 Geo. V. No. 2724))
Artificial Manures Act 1897 (repealed)	61 Vict. No. 1490	17 August 1897
An Act to regulate the Sale of Manure. (Repealed by Artificial Manures Act 1904 (4 Edw. VII. No. 1930))
Melbourne and Metropolitan Board of Works Act 1897 (repealed)	61 Vict. No. 1491	24 August 1897
An Act to amend the Melbourne and Metropolitan Board of Works Acts 1890 (Note: Melbourne and Metropolitan Board of Works Act 1890 (54 Vict. No. 1197)) and 1893. (Note: Melbourne and Metropolitan Board of Works Act 1893 (57 Vict. No. 1351)) (Repealed by Melbourne and Metropolitan Board of Works Act 1915 (6 Geo. V. No. 2696))
Wangaratta and Whitfield Railway Construction Act 1897	61 Vict. No. 1492	24 August 1897
An Act to authorize the construction by the State of a Line of Railway from Wangaratta to Whitfield.
	61 Vict. No. 1493	1 September 1897
An Act to apply out of the Consolidated Revenue the sum of One hundred and twenty-nine thousand and ninety-four pounds to the service of the year One thousand eight hundred and ninety-six and ninety-seven.
	61 Vict. No. 1494	1 September 1897
An Act to apply a sum out of the Consolidated Revenue to the service of the year ending on the thirtieth day of June One thousand eight hundred and ninety-eight and to appropriate the Supplies granted in this Session of Parliament.
Geelong Recreation Site Sale Act 1897	61 Vict. No. 1495	6 September 1897
An Act to provide for the Sale of certain Land reserved as a site for Public Recreation in the Town of Geelong.
South Melbourne Land Act 1897	61 Vict. No. 1496	6 September 1897
An Act to provide for the Resumption by the Crown of certain Land in the City of South Melbourne.
Mining Companies Act 1897 (repealed)	61 Vict. No. 1497	6 September 1897
An Act to provide for the Keeping of Branch Registers by No-liability Mining Companies. (Repealed by Companies Act 1915 (6 Geo. V. No. 2631))
Mildura Trust Loan Amendment Act 1897	61 Vict. No. 1498	6 September 1897
An Act to amend the Mildura Trust Loan Act 1896 (Note: Mildura Trust Loan Act 1896 (60 Vict. No. 1477)) and for other purposes.
Water Supply Loans Application Act 1897	61 Vict. No. 1499	6 September 1897
An Act to sanction the issue and application of certain sums of money as Loans for Water Supply and Irrigation Works in the Country Districts and for other purposes.
Mallee Tanks Act 1897	61 Vict. No. 1500	6 September 1897
An Act to amend the Mallee Tanks Act 1895. (Note: Mallee Tanks Act 1895 (58 Vict. No. 1378))
Municipal Overdrafts (Indemnity) Act 1897	61 Vict. No. 1501	6 September 1897
An Act to indemnify the Councillors of various Municipalities for Borrowing Moneys by Overdrafts on Bankers for the purposes of their Municipalities contrary to the provisions of the Local Government Act 1890 (Note: Local Government Act 1890 (54 Vict. No. 1112)) and for other purposes.
	61 Vict. No. 1502	6 September 1897
An Act to remove certain Doubts as to the operation of Section thirty-one of the Companies Act 1896.
Geelong Trades Hall Site Sale Act 1897	61 Vict. No. 1503	6 September 1897
An Act to provide for the Sale of the Trades Hall Site at Geelong.
Mandurang Lands Act 1897	61 Vict. No. 1504	6 September 1897
An Act to provide for the Resumption by the Crown of certain Land in the Parish of Mandurang.
Eddington Land Act 1897	61 Vict. No. 1505	6 September 1897
An Act to provide for the Resumption by the Crown of certain Land in the parish of Aldington.
Gisborne Land Act 1897	61 Vict. No. 1506	6 September 1897
An Act to provide for the Resumption by the Crown of the Gisborne Cricket Reserve.
Moorpanyal Land Act 1897	61 Vict. No. 1507	6 September 1897
An Act to enable the Mayor Aldermen Councillors and Burgesses of the Town of Geelong to grant a lease of certain Lands in the Parish of Moorpanyal to the Western and Wimmera Districts of Victoria Freezing Company Limited and for other purposes.
Bairnsdale Land Sale Act 1897	61 Vict. No. 1508	6 September 1897
An Act to provide for the Sale of a portion of the Bairnsdale Race-course Reserve.
Sale Lands Act 1897 (repealed)	61 Vict. No. 1509	6 September 1897
An Act to provide for the Resumption by the Crown of certain Land in the parish of Sale and for other purposes. (Repealed by Statute Law Revision Act 1984 (No. 10087))
Hamilton Land Act 1897	61 Vict. No. 1510	6 September 1897
An Act to provide for the Resumption by the Crown of certain Lands in the municipal district of Hamilton.
Bendigo Land Sale Act 1897	61 Vict. No. 1511	6 September 1897
An Act to authorize the Sale of certain Crown Land in the County of Bendigo, City of Bendigo.
Instruments Act 1897 (repealed)	61 Vict. No. 1512	6 September 1897
An Act to further amend the Instruments Act 1890. (Note: Instruments Act 1890 (54 Vict. No. 1103)) (Repealed by Goods Act 1915 (6 Geo. V. No. 2663))
Insolvency Act 1897 (repealed)	61 Vict. No. 1513	6 September 1897
An Act to amend the Law relating to Insolvency. (Repealed by Insolvency Act 1915 (6 Geo. V. No. 2671))
Mines Act 1897 (repealed)	61 Vict. No. 1514	27 September 1897
An Act to amend the Law relating to Mining. (Repealed by Mines Act 1915 (6 Geo. V. No. 2698))
St. Arnaud Land Act 1897	61 Vict. No. 1515	27 September 1897
An Act to revoke the Permanent Reservation of certain Land in the Town of St. Arnaud.
Railway Loan Application Act 1897	61 Vict. No. 1516	27 September 1897
An Act to authorize the Expenditure of certain sums of Money available under Loan Acts for Railways.
Yarra Park Road Act 1897	61 Vict. No. 1517	27 September 1897
An Act to enable portions of the Yarra Park in the City of Melbourne to be used for the purposes of a Road.
Factories and Shops Act 1897 (repealed)	61 Vict. No. 1518	27 September 1897
An Act to amend the Factories and Shops Acts. (Repealed by Factories and Shops Act 1905 (5 Edw. VII. No. 1975))
Dangerous Buildings Removal Act 1897	61 Vict. No. 1519	2 December 1897
An Act to authorize the Speedy Removal of Dangerous Buildings.
Studley Park Bridge Act 1897	61 Vict. No. 1520	8 December 1897
An Act relating to the Studley Park Bridge.
Education Officers and Teachers Act 1897 (repealed)	61 Vict. No. 1521	8 December 1897
An Act relating to certain Officers and Teachers who held office in the Education Department at the passing of The Public Service Act 1883. (Note: Public Service Act 1883 (47 Vict. No. 773)) (Repealed by Public Service Act 1915 (6 Geo. V. No. 2713))
Mining Development Act 1897 (No. 2) (repealed)	61 Vict. No. 1522	8 December 1897
An Act to further amend the Mining Development Act 1896. (Repealed by Mining Development Act 1915 (6 Geo. V. No. 2699))
Melbourne and Metropolitan Board of Works Act 1897 (No. 2) (repealed)	61 Vict. No. 1523	8 December 1897
An Act to amend the Melbourne and Metropolitan Board of Works Act 1897. (Note: Melbourne and Metropolitan Board of Works Act 1897 (61 Vict. No. 1491)) (Repealed by Melbourne and Metropolitan Board of Works Act 1915 (6 Geo. V. No. 2696))
Melbourne and Geelong Parliamentary Elections Act 1897 (repealed)	61 Vict. No. 1524	21 December 1897
An Act to apply a certain provision of the Local Government Act 1890 to the City of Melbourne and Town of Geelong. (Repealed by Constitution Act Amendment Act 1915 (6 Geo. V. No. 2632))
Great Morwell Railway Act 1897	61 Vict. No. 1525	21 December 1897
An Act to validate the purchase of the Great Morwell Coal Company's Line of Railway.
Income Tax Rate Act 1897 (repealed)	61 Vict. No. 1526	21 December 1897
An Act to declare the Rates of Duties of Income Tax for the Year ending on the thirty-first day of December One thousand eight hundred and ninety-eight. (Repealed by Income Tax Act 1915 (6 Geo. V. No. 2668))
Public Contracts Act 1897 (repealed)	61 Vict. No. 1527	21 December 1897
An Act relating to certain Public Contracts. (Repealed by Instruments Act 1915 (6 Geo. V. No. 2672))
Dunolly Cemetery Act 1897 (repealed)	61 Vict. No. 1528	21 December 1897
An Act to provide for the Extension of the Dunolly Cemetery. (Repealed by Statute Law Revision Act 1984 (No. 10087))
Dookie and Katamatite Tramway Act 1897 (repealed)	61 Vict. No. 1529	21 December 1897
An Act relating to the Dookie and Katamatite Tramway. (Repealed by Transport Act 1983 (No. 9921))
Rutherglen Main Street Act 1897	61 Vict. No. 1530	21 December 1897
An Act to enable the Main Street of Rutherglen to be reduced to a width not less than Fifty-six feet.
Trust Funds Act 1897	61 Vict. No. 1531	21 December 1897
An Act to vest the Trust Funds in Trustees and for other purposes.
Birchip Land Act 1897	61 Vict. No. 1532	21 December 1897
An Act to provide for the Resumption by the Crown of certain Land reserved as a site for a Mechanics' Institute and Public Hall at Birchip.
Port Melbourne Public Park and Garden Act 1897 (repealed)	61 Vict. No. 1533	21 December 1897
An Act to provide a Site for a Public Park and Garden at Port Melbourne. (Repealed by Statute Law Revision Act 1984 (No. 10087))
Public and Bank Holidays Act 1897 (repealed)	61 Vict. No. 1534	21 December 1897
An Act relating to certain Public and Bank Holidays. (Repealed by Public Service Act 1915 (6 Geo. V. No. 2713))
Berry Annuity Act 1897	61 Vict. No. 1535	21 December 1897
An Act to provide for the Purchase of an Annuity for the Honorable Sir Graham Berry, K.C.M.G., late Speaker of the Legislative Assembly.
Colonial Ammunition Company Limited Act 1897 (repealed)	61 Vict. No. 1536	21 December 1897
An Act relating to the Colonial Ammunition Company Limited. (Repealed by Statute Law Revision Act 1995 (No. 11 of 1995))
Post Office Act 1897	61 Vict. No. 1537	21 December 1897
An Act to amend the Post Office Act 1890 (Note: Post Office Act 1890 (54 Vict. No. 1128)) and for other purposes.
Vermin Destruction Act 1897 (repealed)	61 Vict. No. 1538	21 December 1897
An Act to amend the Vermin Destruction Act 1890. (Note: Vermin Destruction Act 1890 (54 Vict. No. 1153)) (Repealed by Vermin Destruction Act 1915 (6 Geo. V. No. 2745))
Cape Patterson and Kilcunda Junction Railway Act Fifth Amendment Act 1897	61 Vict. No. 1539	21 December 1897
An Act to amend and continue an Act intituled "An Act to authorize the construction of the Cape Patterson and Kilcunda Junction Railway and for other purposes." (Note: Cape Patterson and Kilcunda Junction Railway Act 1888 (52 Vict. No. 980))
Bungaree Junction to Race-course Reserve Railway Act 1897	61 Vict. No. 1540	21 December 1897
An Act for the purpose of constructing a Railway Siding from Bungaree Junction to the Race-course Reserve.
Defunct Companies Act 1897	61 Vict. No. 1541	21 December 1897
An Act relating to Defunct Companies.
Public Service Reclassification Act 1897	61 Vict. No. 1542	21 December 1897
An Act to provide for the appointment of a Board to reclassify the Public Service and for other purposes.

== Sources ==
- "1897 Victorian Historical Acts". AustLII.
