= Marungi =

- Town
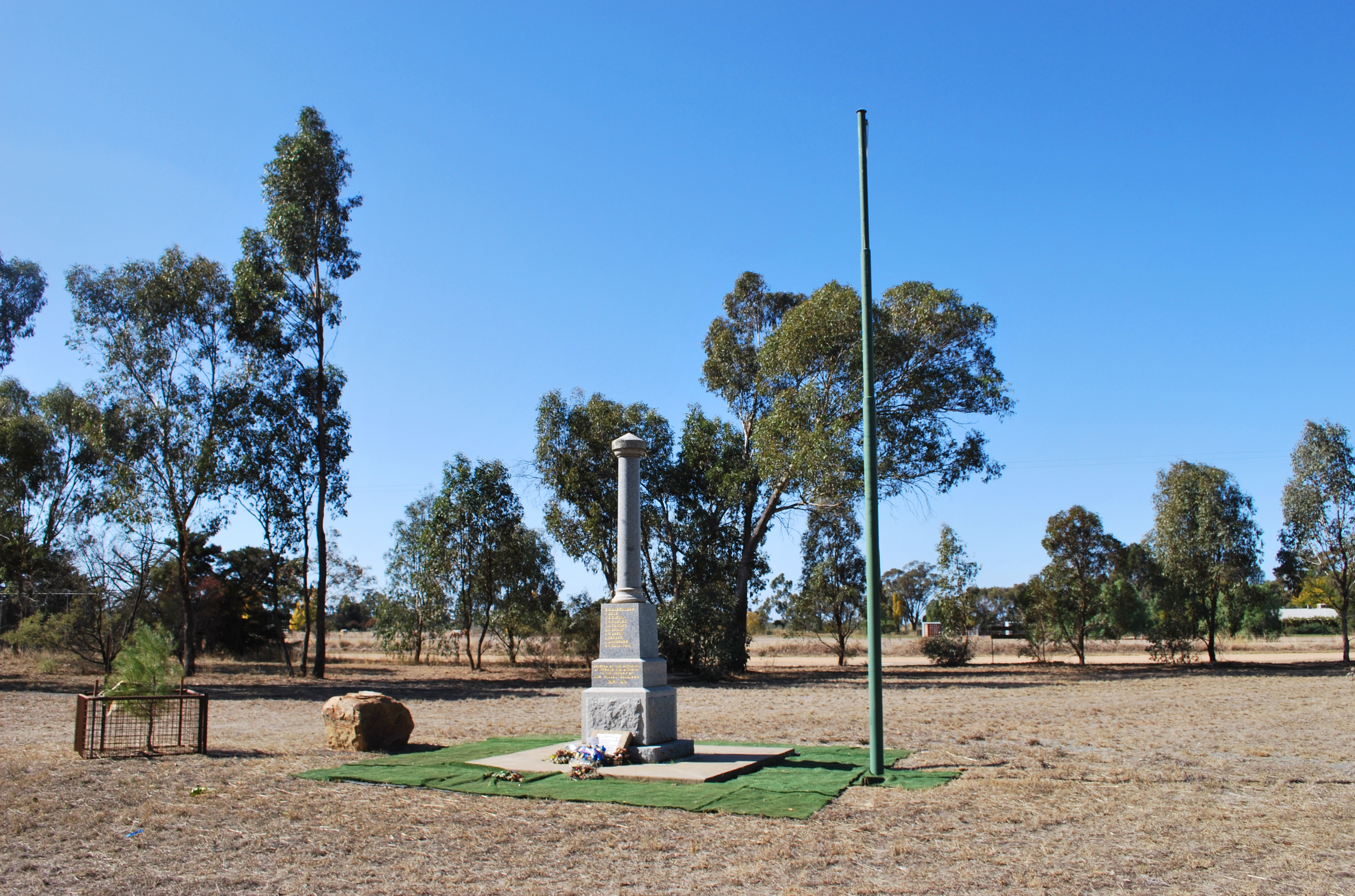
- Marungi Memorial Park

- Coordinates: 36°11′38″S 145°31′53″E
- Country: Australia
- State: Victoria
- Region: Hume
- LGAs: Shire of Moira; City of Greater Shepparton

Government
  - State electorates: Ovens Valley; Shepparton
  - Federal division: Nicholls

Population
  - Total: 111 (2016 census)
- Postcode: 3634
Localities around Marungi
Drumanure	Invergordon	Invergordon
Tallygaroopna	Marungi	Katandra West
Tallygaroopna	Marionvale	Katandra West

Marungi is a locality in northern Victoria. The locality is shared between the local government areas of the Shire of Moira and City of Greater Shepparton.

The post office opened on 20 October 1879 and was closed on 17 May 1971.
