= Cobram East =

- Town
- Coordinates: 35°58′47″S 145°44′42″E
- Country: Australia
- State: Victoria
- Region: Hume
- LGA: Shire of Moira

Government
  - State electorate: Ovens Valley
  - Federal division: Nicholls

Population
  - Total: 242 (2016 census)
- Postcode: 3644
Localities around Cobram East
Cobram	Barooga (NSW)	Boomanoomana (NSW)
Cobram	Cobram East	Boomanoomana (NSW)
Katamatite	Katamatite East	Boosey

Cobram East is a locality situated in the Shire of Moira, Victoria, Australia. The locality is close to the Murray River.

It features a caravan park and offers numerous walking tracks in the state forest. The post office in the area was initially opened as 'Cobram' on 1 January 1870. However, it was later renamed to 'Boomerang' on 1 January 1888 due to the opening of another post office to the west on the same date. Subsequently, 'Boomerang Post Office' was further renamed to 'Cobram East' on 12 March 1888. Later, the post office closed its services on 31 May 1961.
