= Shire of Moira =

Local Government Area (LGA) in Victoria, Australia

Coordinates: 36°05′00″S 145°39′00″E

Moira Shire Council
- Local government area
- Location in Victoria

- Interactive map of Moira Shire Council
- Country: Australia
- State: Victoria
- Region: Hume
- Established: 1994
- Council seat: Cobram

Government
  - Mayor: Cr Libro Mustica
  - State electorates: Ovens Valley; Shepparton
  - Federal division: Nicholls

Area
  - Total: 4,045 km^{2} (1,562 sq mi)

Population
  - Total: 30,522 (2021 census)
  - Density: 7.5456/km^{2} (19.5430/sq mi)
- Gazetted: 18 November 1994
- Website: Moira Shire Council
LGAs around Moira Shire Council
Murray River (NSW)	Berrigan (NSW)	Federation (NSW)
Murray River (NSW)	Moira Shire Council	Indigo
Campaspe	Greater Shepparton	Benalla; Wangaratta

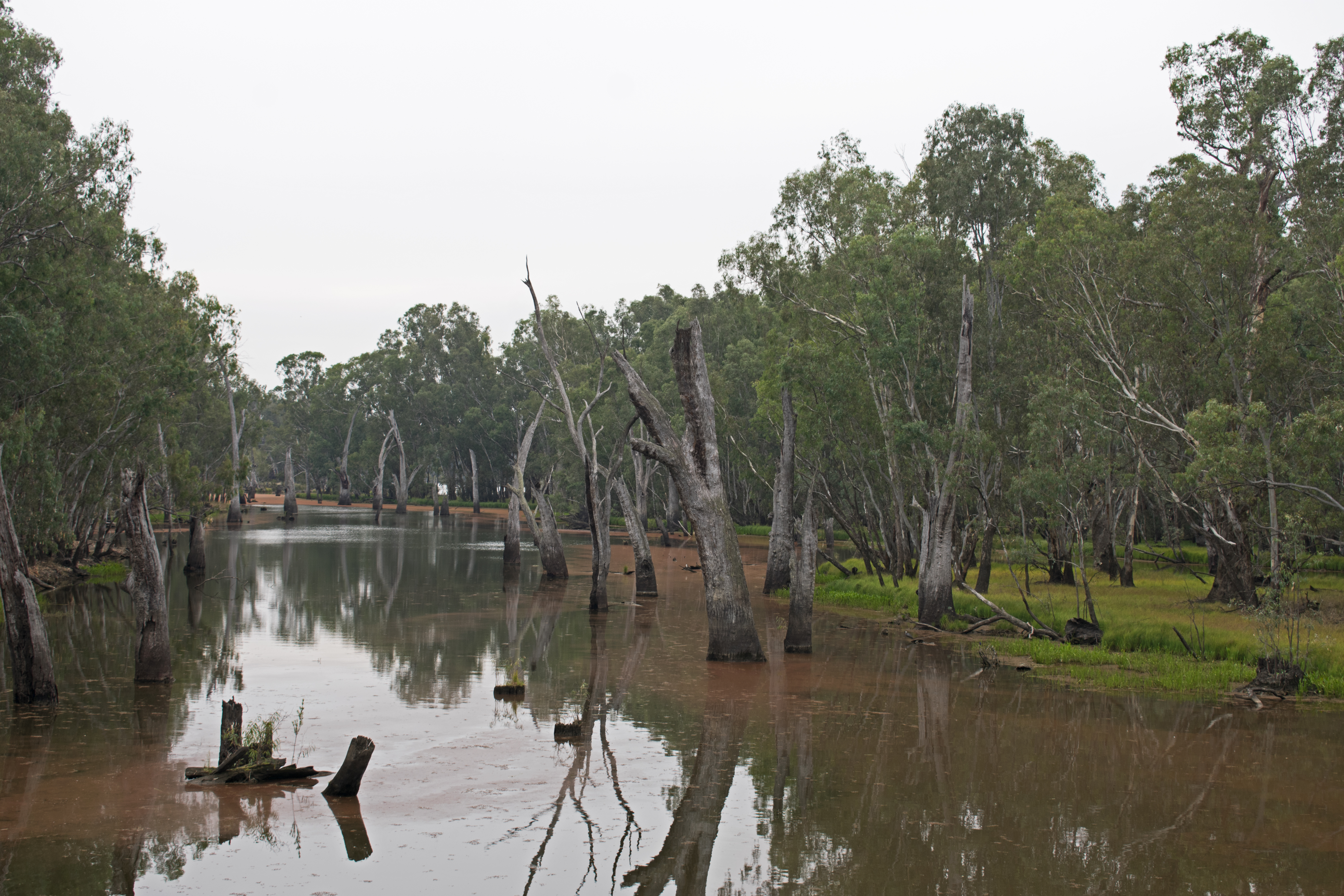
Ovens River seen from Murray Valley Highway

Moira Shire is a local government area in the Northern Victoria Region of Victoria, Australia. Located in the north-east part of the state, it covers an area of 4,045 square kilometres (1,562 mi^{2}). As at August 2021 the population was 30,522. It includes the towns of Cobram, Nathalia, Numurkah and Yarrawonga.

The Shire is governed and administered by the Moira Shire Council; its seat of local government and administrative centre is located at the council headquarters in Cobram, it also has a service centre located in Yarrawonga. The Shire is named after the county of Moira, of which the LGA occupies the northern part.

== History ==
The Shire of Moira was formed in 1994 from the amalgamation of the Shire of Cobram, Shire of Nathalia, Shire of Numurkah, Shire of Tungamah (less the Katandra district) and Shire of Yarrawonga (less the Peechelba township area).

By the time of the Local Government Board's review of north-eastern Victoria earlier that year, Nathalia and Numurkah had expressed readiness to merge with each other, as had Tungamah and Yarrawonga (who were also open to a three-way merger with the Shire of Rutherglen). These four shires did not support further amalgamation, owing to concerns that travel times would be excessive, and that the irrigated farmers in the west and dryland farmers in the east did not belong in the same shire. However, the Board was ultimately persuaded by a submission from the Shire of Cobram, which proposed a merger of all five councils into a new Shire that would benefit from a diversified agricultural base and a stronger capability in dealing with the area's drainage and flooding issues.

In the Local Government Board's initial proposal, the Shire was to be called "Muckatah". This name, suggested by the Shire of Cobram, was taken from the locality of Muckatah situated near the geographic centre of the LGA, and the Muckatah Depression, a drainage basin extending across much of the Shire from Boomahnoomoonah (south-east of Yarrawonga) to Numurkah.

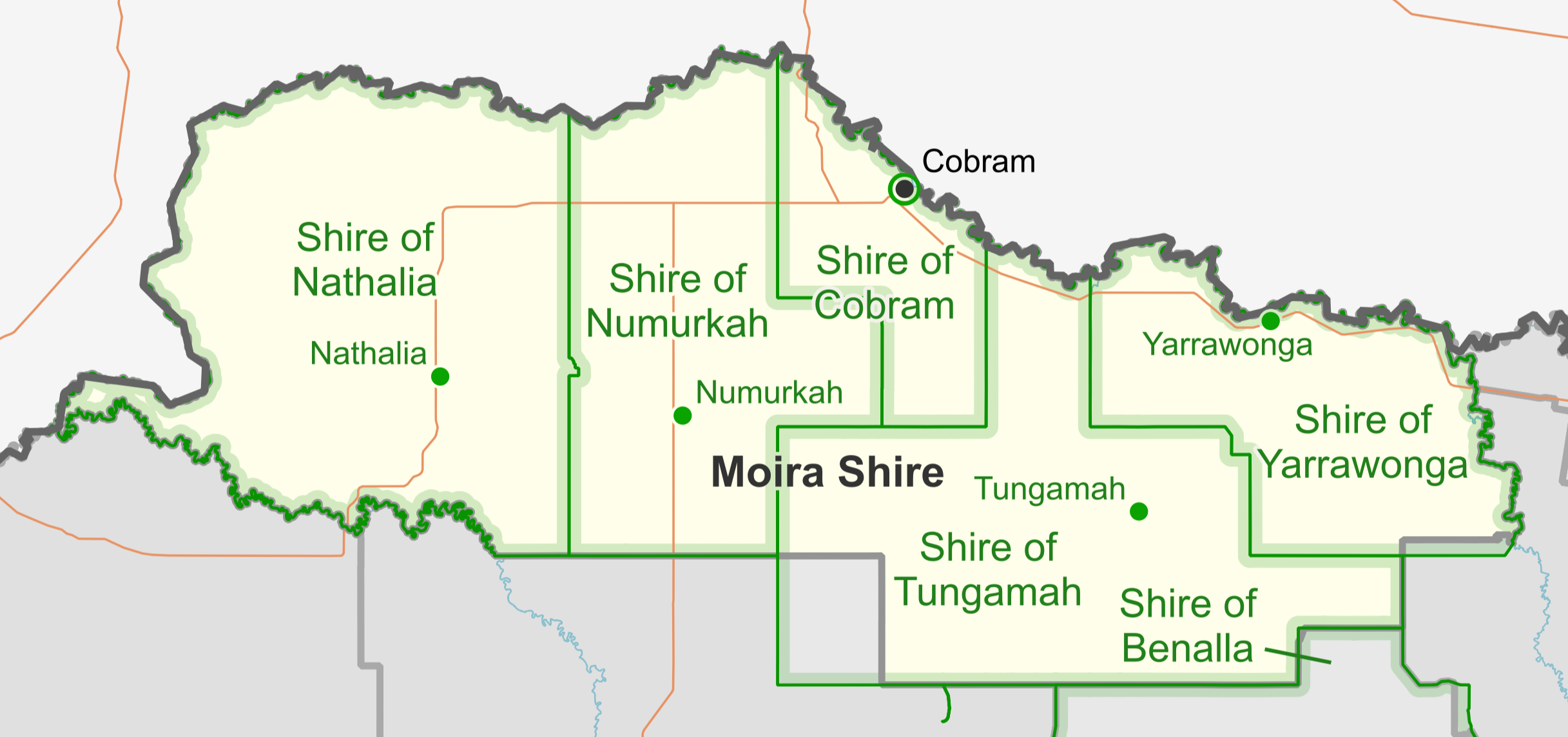
Moira Shire's predecessor LGAs (green) as they were in 1994. The administrative centres of the former LGAs are marked by green dots.

== Council ==
=== Current composition ===
The council is composed of nine councillors elected to represent an unsubdivided municipality.

In the wake of a report detailing the "preventable" murder of a senior manager, the Moira Shire council was dismissed by the Minister for Local Government, Melissa Horne on 7 March 2023. An interim administrator has been appointed. Elections for a new council will not be held until 2028.

=== Administration and governance ===
The council meets in various locations around the Shire. It also provides customer services at both its administrative centre in Cobram and its service centre in Yarrawonga.

== Townships and localities ==
In the 2021 census, the shire had a population of 30,522, up from 29,112 in the 2016 census.

Population
Locality	2016	2021
Almonds	26	31
Barmah	282	229
Bathumi	62	76
Bearii	145	167
Boomahnoomoonah	22	14
Boosey	105	108
Boweya North	43	42
Bundalong	428	512
Bundalong South	51	42
Burramine	197	241
Burramine South	24	24
Cobram	6,014	6,148
Cobram East	242	232
Drumanure	41	41
Esmond	9	17
Invergordon	610	601
Kaarimba	85	93
Katamatite	401	453
Katamatite East	35	30
Katunga	996	1,025
Koonoomoo	296	305
Kotupna	105	132
Lake Rowan	66	70
Lower Moira	25	30
Marungi^	111	98
Muckatah	213	170
Mundoona	119	138
Mywee	14	20
Naring	120	122
Nathalia	1,880	1,982
Numurkah	4,477	4,604
Peechelba^	184	177
Pelluebla	33	29
Picola	207	206
Picola West	9	14
St James	132	123
Strathmerton	1,052	1,072
Telford	24	21
Tungamah	408	449
Ulupna	23	17
Waaia	390	420
Waggarandall	40	52
Wilby	166	192
Wunghnu	334	326
Yabba North	101	104
Yabba South	27	32
Yalca	206	222
Yarrawonga	7,930	8,661
Yarrawonga South	15	15
Yarroweyah	548	551
Yielima	87	93
Youanmite	59	56
Youarang	39	34
Yundool	44	52

^ - Territory divided with another LGA

== See also ==
- List of localities (Victoria)
- List of places on the Victorian Heritage Register in the Shire of Moira
