= Katamatite East =

- Town
- Coordinates: 36°16′48″S 145°40′54″E
- Country: Australia
- State: Victoria
- Region: Hume
- LGA: Shire of Moira

Government
  - State electorate: Ovens Valley
  - Federal division: Murray

Population
  - Total: 35 (2016 census)
- Postcode: 3646
Localities around Katamatite East
Cobram East	Cobram East	Cobram East
Katamatite	Katamatite East	Boosey
Katamatite	Katamatite	Boosey

Katamatite East is a locality in Victoria, Australia in the local government area of the Shire of Moira. Cobram East borders the north of the locality, Katamatite borders the west and south of the locality, and Boosey borders the east of the locality.
