= Mundoona =

- Town
- Coordinates: 36°08′54″S 145°19′54″E
- Country: Australia
- State: Victoria
- Region: Hume
- LGA: Shire of Moira

Government
  - State electorate: Shepparton
  - Federal division: Nicholls

Population
  - Total: 119 (2016 census)
- Postcode: 3637
Localities around Mundoona
Waaia	Numurkah	Numurkah
Kaarimba	Mundoona	Wunghnu
Tallygaroopna	Tallygaroopna	Tallygaroopna

Mundoona is a locality in northern Victoria, Australia in the local government area of the Shire of Moira. At the 2016 census, Mundoona had a population of 119.

Yalca post office (in the Mundoona locality) opened on 9 September 1879, and closed on 23 August 1957. Mundoona State School post office opened in 1907, renamed Mundoona in 1907, and closed on 18 July 1952.
