= Waggarandall =

- Town
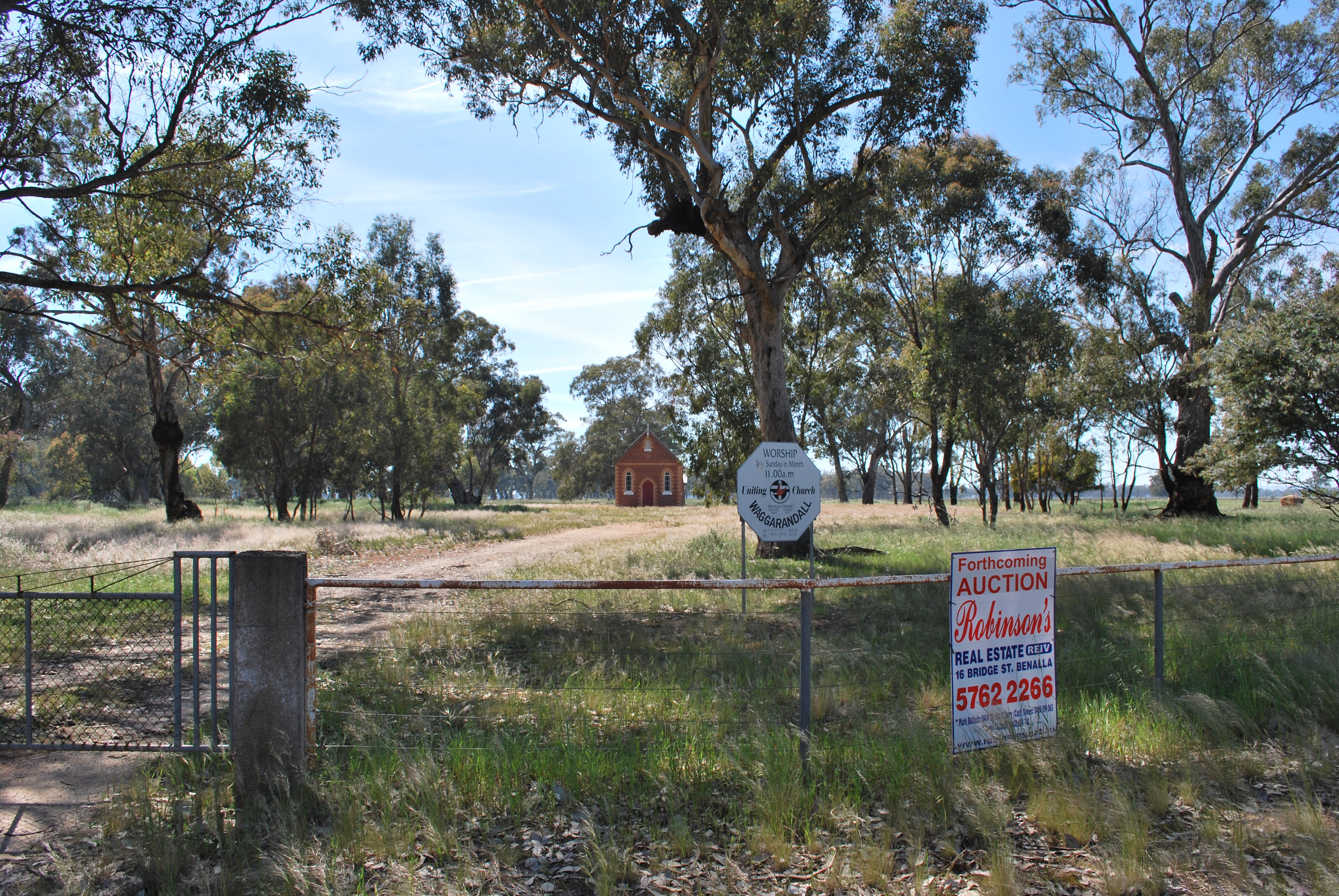
- Uniting church

- Coordinates: 36°15′07″S 145°48′02″E
- Country: Australia
- State: Victoria
- Region: Hume
- LGA: Shire of Moira

Government
  - State electorate: Ovens Valley
  - Federal division: Nicholls

Population
  - Total: 52 (SAL 2021)
- Postcode: 3646
Localities around Waggarandall
Youanmite	Youarang	Tungamah
Yabba North	Waggarandall	St James
Yabba South	Dookie	Yundool

Waggarandall is a locality in the Shire of Moira, Victoria.

Waggarandall post office opened on 12 February 1879 and was closed on 31 December 1964.

Waggarandall Uniting Church, established in the 1880s, served the locality until its closure on 28 October 2012.
