= Invergordon, Victoria =

Invergordon
- Town
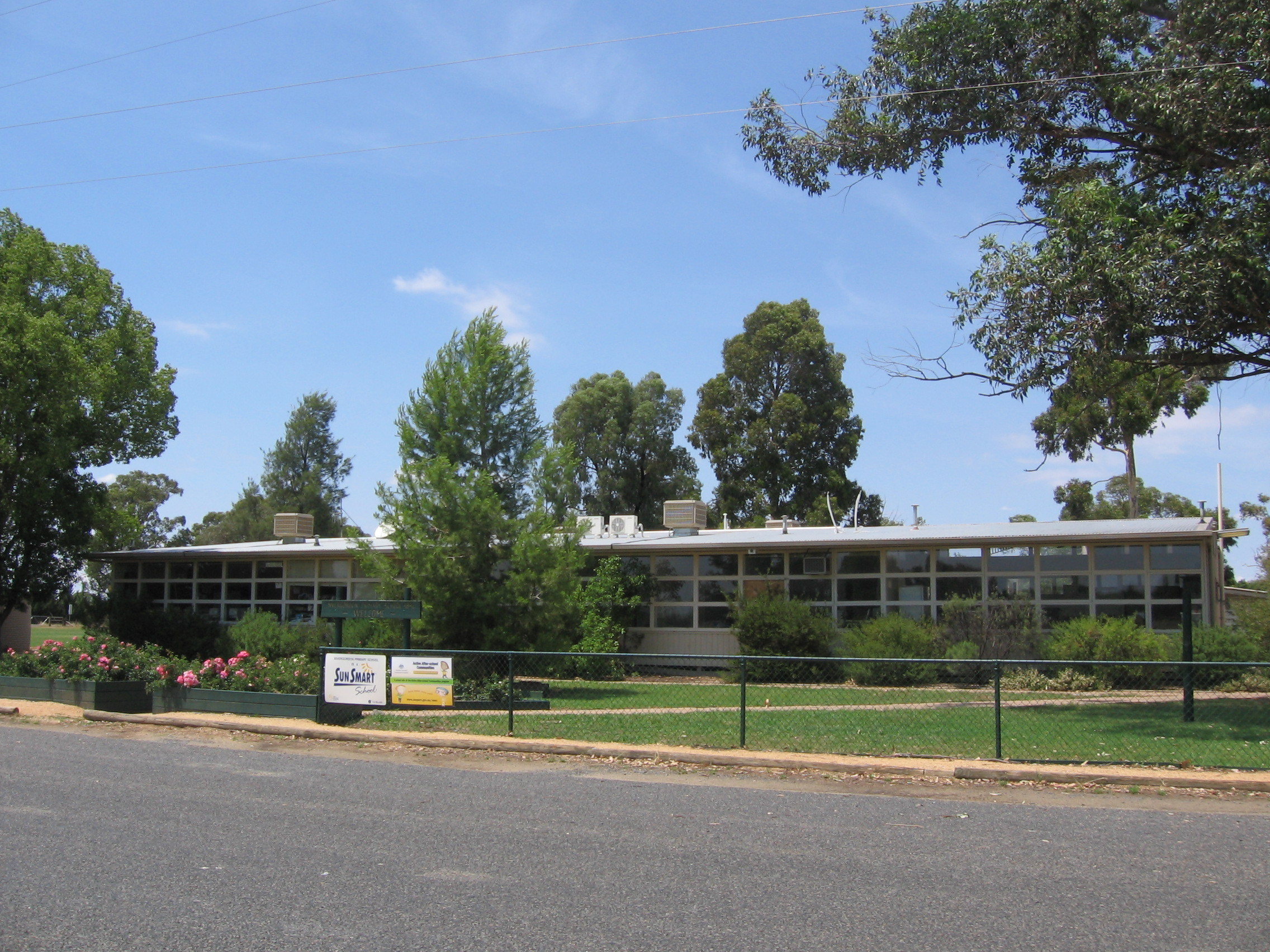
- Former Invergordon Primary School

- Interactive map of Invergordon
- Coordinates: 36°11′S 145°38′E
- Country: Australia
- State: Victoria
- Region: Hume
- LGA: Shire of Moira
- Location: 228 km (142 mi) N of Melbourne; 35 km (22 mi) NW of Shepparton; 16 km (9.9 mi) S of Katamatite

Government
  - State electorates: Ovens Valley; Shepparton
  - Federal division: Nicholls

Population
  - Total: 610 (2016 census)
- Postcode: 3636
- Mean max temp: 21.4 °C (70.5 °F)
- Mean min temp: 11.7 °C (53.1 °F)
- Annual rainfall: 376 mm (14.8 in)
Localities around Invergordon
Numurkah	Naring	Katamatite
Drumanure	Invergordon	Youanmite
Marungi	Katandra	Katandra West

Invergordon is a town in northern Victoria, Australia.

The town is located 31 km from Numurkah (33 min drive) and 37 km from Shepparton (41 min drive). It is predominantly a farming area.

At the 2011 census, Invergordon and the surrounding area had a population of 647.

The Post Office opened on 1 February 1882 as Drumanure, was renamed Invergordon in 1885, Invergordon North in 1966 and closed in 1970. An Invergordon South Post Office opened in 1927 and closed in 1953.

The football club folded in 1987 due to population decline in the district and in 2018 Invergordon primary school closed after the last four students left the area. The school was later reopened in 2021 as a campus of Greater Shepparton Secondary College.
