= Drumanure =

- Town
- Coordinates: 36°09′35″S 145°29′09″E
- Country: Australia
- State: Victoria
- Region: Hume
- LGA: Shire of Moira

Government
  - State electorate: Shepparton
  - Federal division: Nicholls

Area
  - Total: 21.511 km^{2} (8.305 sq mi)

Population
  - Total: 41 (2016 census)
  - Density: 1.906/km^{2} (4.94/sq mi)
- Postcode: 3636
Localities around Drumanure
| Numurkah | Numurkah | Invergordon |
| Wunghnu | Drumanure | Marungi |
| Tallygaroopna | Tallygarooppna | Marungi |

Drumanure is a locality in the Shire of Moira Victoria, Australia. It approximately 193 km from Melbourne.

The post office there opened on 16 December 1887 and was closed on 4 February 1956.

== Drumanure Football Club ==
The Drumanure Football Club, formed in 1896, won six consecutive Goulburn Valley Football Association (GVFA) premierships from 1901 to 1906. They also won another GVFA premiership in 1908 and were runners up in the GVFA in 1899 and 1910.

After 32 years in the GVFA they joined the Katandra District Football Association (KDFA) in 1928 and immediately won the 1928 and 1929 KDFA premierships.
