= Wunghnu =

- Town
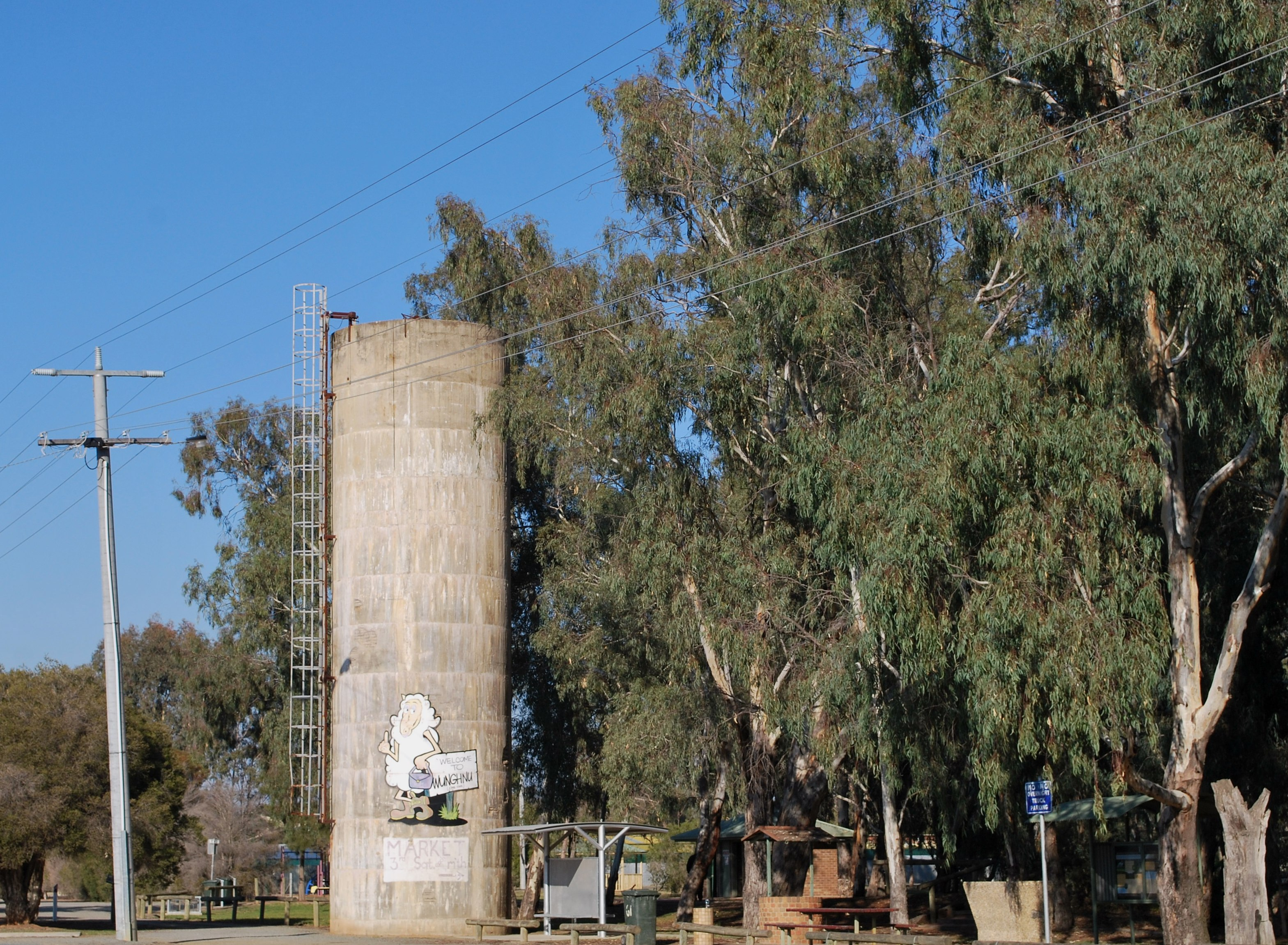
- Rest area at Wunghnu showing the mural on the water tower

- Interactive map of Wunghnu
- Coordinates: 36°09′S 145°25′E
- Country: Australia
- State: Victoria
- Region: Hume
- LGA: Shire of Moira
- Location: 204 km (127 mi) N of Melbourne; 26 km (16 mi) N of Shepparton; 7 km (4.3 mi) S of Numurkah

Government
  - State electorate: Shepparton
  - Federal division: Nicholls

Population
  - Total: 334 (2016 census)
- Postcode: 3635
- Annual rainfall: 427 mm (16.8 in)
Localities around Wunghnu
Numurkah	Numurkah	Numurkah
Mundoona	Wunghnu	Drumanure
Bunbartha	Tallygaroopna	Tallygaroopna

Wunghnu (/ˈwʌn.juː/ WUN-yoo) is a town in the Goulburn Valley region of northern Victoria, Australia. The town is located in the Shire of Moira local government area, 204 kilometres (127 mi) north of the state capital, Melbourne. The local railway station was opened on the Goulburn Valley railway in 1881, but does not see any passenger services, being the site of a siding and grain silos.

Wunghnu Post Office opened earlier on 6 July 1877.

Wunghnu is situated on the Goulburn Valley Highway (Carlisle Street) and the Nine Mile Creek runs through the town at the north end. Wunghnu Primary School is located on the west side of the highway near the creek. The 1u cafe (recently re-opened in May 2012) is also located at the north end of town on the east side of the highway opposite the water tower and Graham Park and local public toilets are located near the creek. This area is a popular rest stop for travellers.

The town had an Australian rules football team competing in the Picola & District Football League however folded due to a lack of players. Wunghnu has a bowls club and a Vintage Tractor Pull and Rally run by the Goulburn Valley Vintage Tractor And Farm Machinery Club held annually on the last full weekend of March.

Wunghnu has an active volunteer fire brigade which is part of Country Fire Authority (CFA).

A private automatic weather station is maintained in Wunghnu.

== See also ==
- Wunghnu railway station
- Wunghnu Football Club
