= Numurkah =

- Town
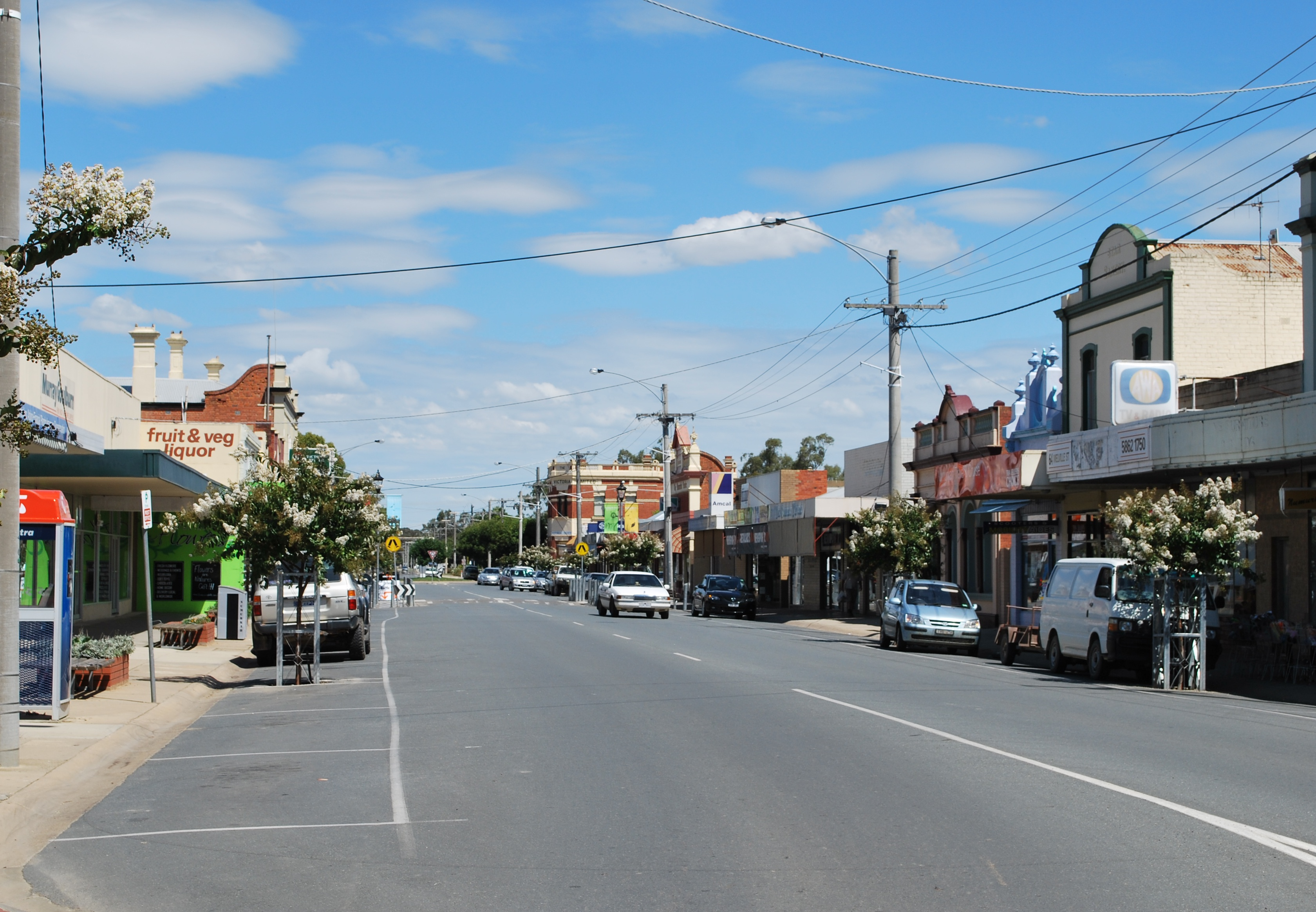
- Melville St, the main street of Numurkah

- Interactive map of Numurkah
- Coordinates: 36°05′0″S 145°26′0″E
- Country: Australia
- State: Victoria
- Region: Hume
- LGA: Shire of Moira
- Location: 228 km (142 mi) N of Melbourne; 37 km (23 mi) N of Shepparton
- Established: 1868

Government
  - State electorate: Shepparton
  - Federal division: Nicholls
- Elevation: 108 m (354 ft)

Population
  - Total: 3,807 (2021 census)
- Postcode: 3636
- Mean max temp: 22.2 °C (72.0 °F)
- Mean min temp: 9.0 °C (48.2 °F)
- Annual rainfall: 394.1 mm (15.52 in)
Localities around Numurkah
Waaia	Katunga	Katunga
Kaarimba	Numurkah	Naring
Mundoona	Wunghnu	Invergordon

Numurkah (/njuːˈmɜːrkə/ new-MUR-kə) is a town in Victoria, Australia, located on the Goulburn Valley Highway, 37 kilometres (23 mi) north of Shepparton, in the Shire of Moira. At the 2021 census, Numurkah had a population of 3,807.

== History ==
The area was occupied by the Yorta Yorta people prior to European settlement. Squatters moved into the area from NSW in the late 1830s. After the pastoral runs were made available for farm selection, the township of Numurkah was surveyed in 1875, the Post Office opening 2 November 1878.

The local railway station was opened on the Goulburn Valley railway in 1881, but has not seen any passenger services since 1993 when the train to Cobram was withdrawn. The station building remains in private ownership, and a footbridge crosses the line.

Numurkah became the headquarters of the Murray Valley Soldier Settlement Area - one of the largest soldier settlements in Australia - after World War I. Under this scheme 700 ex-servicemen were given land to develop for agriculture.

The name is thought to be derived from an Aboriginal word meaning war shield,. The town hosts an art show in March, a fishing competition in April, go-kart championships in September and a car show in December.

The Numurkah Magistrates' Court closed on 1 January 1990.

== Recreation ==
The town has an Australian rules football team competing in the Murray Football League.

Golfers play at the course of the Numurkah Golf Club on Tunnock Road.

Other popular sports include: Tennis, Lawn Bowls & Boxing. A Gymnasium & Outdoor Swimming Pool are operated during the warmer months.

== Biodiversity and natural features ==
Numurkah is a low lying town located on the floodplain of the Broken Creek. The Broken Creek flows into the Murray River just north of the township of Barmah. The riparian area adjacent to the creek has a dominant over-storey of Eucalyptus camaldulensis (red gum). Above the floodplain tree species include Eucalyptus microcarpa (grey box), Eucalyptus melliodora (yellow box) and Callitris glaucophylla (Murray pine). There is a small roosting population of grey-headed flying foxes (Pteropus poliocephalus)and little red flying foxes (Pteropus scapulatus). These mega-bats are important pollinators of native tree species. Their diet is nectar, pollen, and fruit. The little red flying fox has translucent wings and eats nectar from flowers almost exclusively. Both have long tongues for getting deep into flowers. Numurkah also is home to many species of insect eating microbats (small bats) with the Gould's wattled bat being the most common. These small bats live in tree hollows and play an important role in insect control eating large quantities of insects each night.

Adjacent to the golf course, is also one of the easternmost remnants of the Northern Plains Grassland community known as the Numurkah Grassland. It is home to many native wildflowers and grasses such as billy button, small vanilla lily, everlasting etc.

== Natural disasters ==
In 2012 Numurkah had some devastating floods which saw a large portion of the town inundated by flood water including the local hospital which was demolished as a result. The rebuilt hospital facilities include 16 multi-day beds, six same-day treatment spaces, an operating theatre, imaging services, and an urgent care centre.

In 2014, the township was threatened when three fires north of Shepparton in the Wunghnu, Numurkah and Bunbartha area merged into one bushfire (Wunghnu Complex Fire) over 12,000 hectares in size. Large amounts of livestock were lost and extensive damage to properties was incurred. Aerial support, tankers from other Victorian Regions and N.S.W. attended the fire, diverting the fire front around the town to the east.

== Notable residents ==
- George Moss (1913–85), member of the Victorian Legislative Assembly for Murray Valley (1945–73)
- Joe Ritchie (1886-1975), Australian rules footballer with St Kilda (1909)
- Peter Wellington (born 1957), Speaker of the Legislative Assembly of Queensland (2015–17)
- Sir Harold Leslie White CBE (1905–92), Parliamentary Librarian of Australia (1947–60) and National Librarian (1960–70)

== See also ==
- Numurkah Football Club
