= Katunga =

- Town
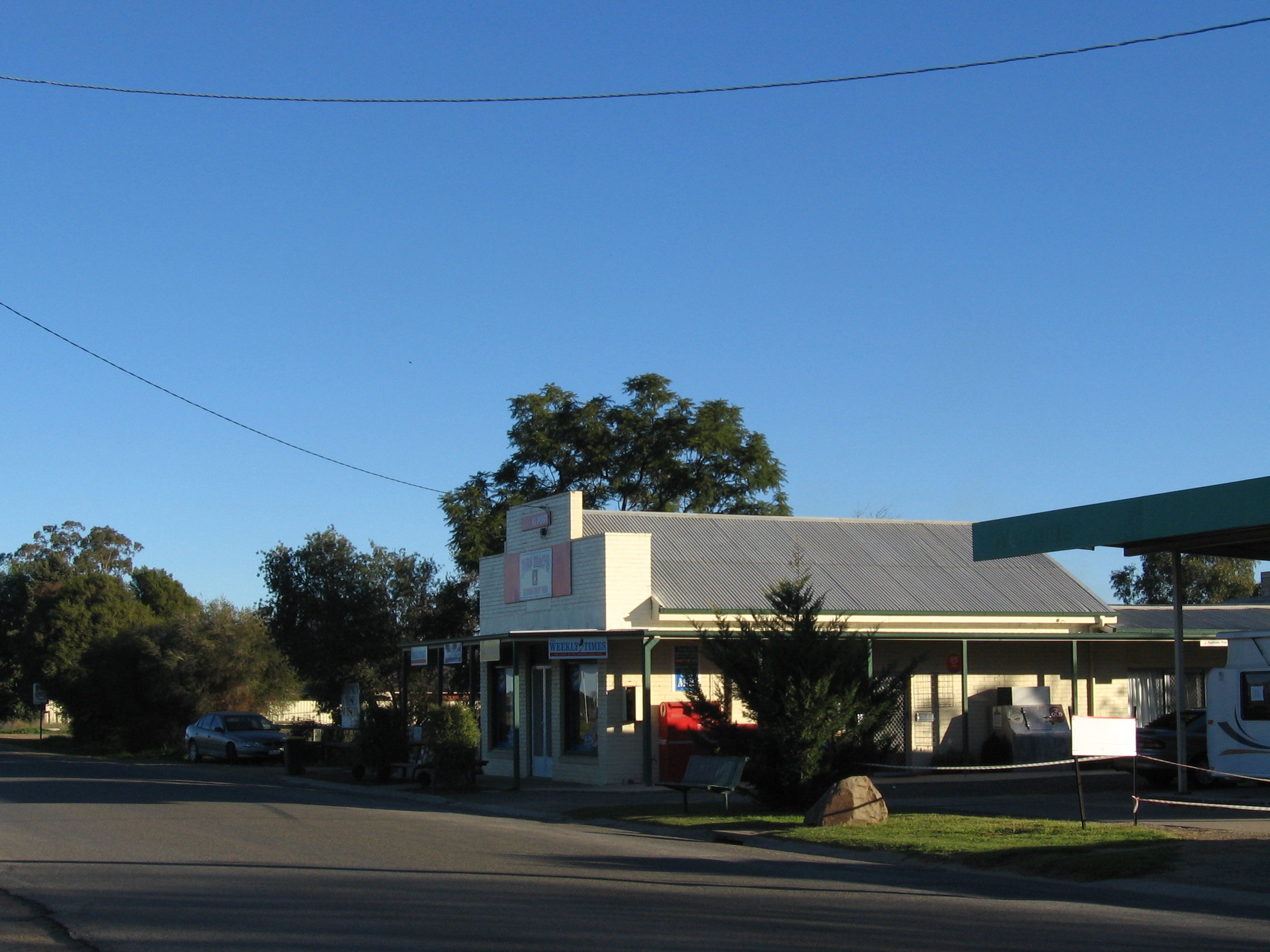
- Katunga General Store, June 2007

- Interactive map of Katunga
- Coordinates: 36°01′0″S 145°28′0″E
- Country: Australia
- State: Victoria
- Region: Hume
- LGA: Shire of Moira
- Location: 228 km (142 mi) from Melbourne; 13 km (8.1 mi) from Numurkah

Government
  - State electorate: Shepparton
  - Federal division: Nicholls

Population
  - Total: 1,025 (2021 census)
- Postcode: 3640
Localities around Katunga
Yalca	Strathmerton	Yarroweyah
Yalca	Katunga	Muckatah
Waaia	Numurkah	Naring

Katunga is a town in the Goulburn Valley region of northern Victoria, Australia. The town is located in the Shire of Moira local government area, 228 kilometres from the state capital, Melbourne. At the 2021 census, Katunga had a population of 1,025.

Katunga post office opened on 10 June 1881. The local railway station was opened on the Goulburn Valley railway in October 1888, and was closed to passengers in September 1978. There is still a rail-served gain silo.

As with much of the surrounding area, the economy of Katunga is based on agriculture, including dairy production. Bizarrely, until the end of 2021 the town had two state primary schools. About 90 students attended Katunga primary and seven students were at Katunga South primary, just 2 km away. Katunga South closed at the end of 2021 after the last three students left.

The Katunga Football Club competes in the Picola & District Football League.
