= Youarang =

- Town
- Coordinates: 36°10′25″S 145°47′05″E
- Country: Australia
- State: Victoria
- Region: Hume
- LGA: Shire of Moira

Government
  - State electorate: Ovens Valley
  - Federal division: Nicholls

Population
  - Total: 39 (2016 census)
- Postcode: 3728
Localities around Youarang
Katamatite	Boosey	Burramine South
Youanmite	Youarang	Tungamah
Youanmite	Waggarandall	Tungamah

Youarang is a locality in northern Victoria, Australia in the local government area of the Shire of Moira.

Youarang post office opened on 8 June 1877, closed on 17 December 1910, reopened on 19 September 1911 and closed on 1 August 1952.
