= Waaia =

- Town
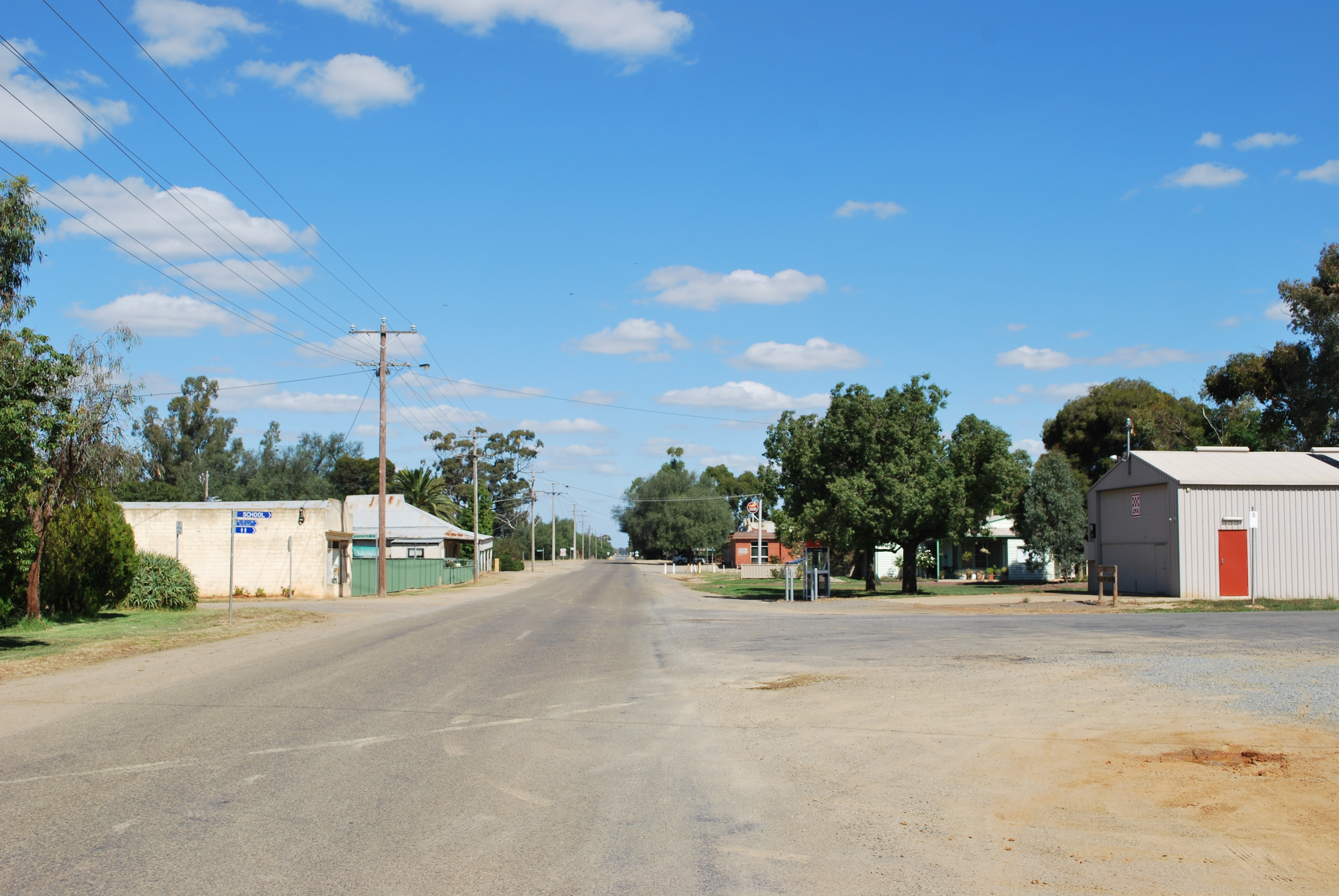
- Waaia Hotel

- Interactive map of Waaia
- Coordinates: 36°03′0″S 145°21′0″E
- Country: Australia
- State: Victoria
- Region: Hume
- LGA: Shire of Moira
- Location: 228 km (142 mi) N of Melbourne; 38 km (24 mi) N of Shepparton; 69 km (43 mi) E of Echuca; 14 km (8.7 mi) E of Nathalia

Government
  - State electorate: Shepparton
  - Federal division: Nicholls

Population
  - Total: 390 (2016 census)
- Postcode: 3637
Localities around Waaia
Yalca	Yalca	Katunga
Nathalia	Waaia	Numurkah
Nathalia	Kaarimba	Numurkah

Waaia (/ˈweɪaɪ/ WAY-eye) is a town in northern Victoria, Australia in the Shire of Moira local government area, 228 kilometres (142 mi) north of the state capital, Melbourne. The area is home to mainly irrigated dairy farms. At the 2016 census, Waaia and the surrounding area had a population of 390 up from 376 in 2011.

== History ==
Waaia was established in the late 1880s to cater for the increasing rural population of the surrounding area following the opening of the railway line in October 1888, and a Post Office opened on 17 December that year. The rail line closed in 1986.

The town consists of a school (established 1890), a hotel and an Australian rules football ground (the town has a team in the Picola & District Football League), along with around 10 houses.

Waaia is home to an annual tractor pull, organised by the local community action group.
