= Naring =

- Town
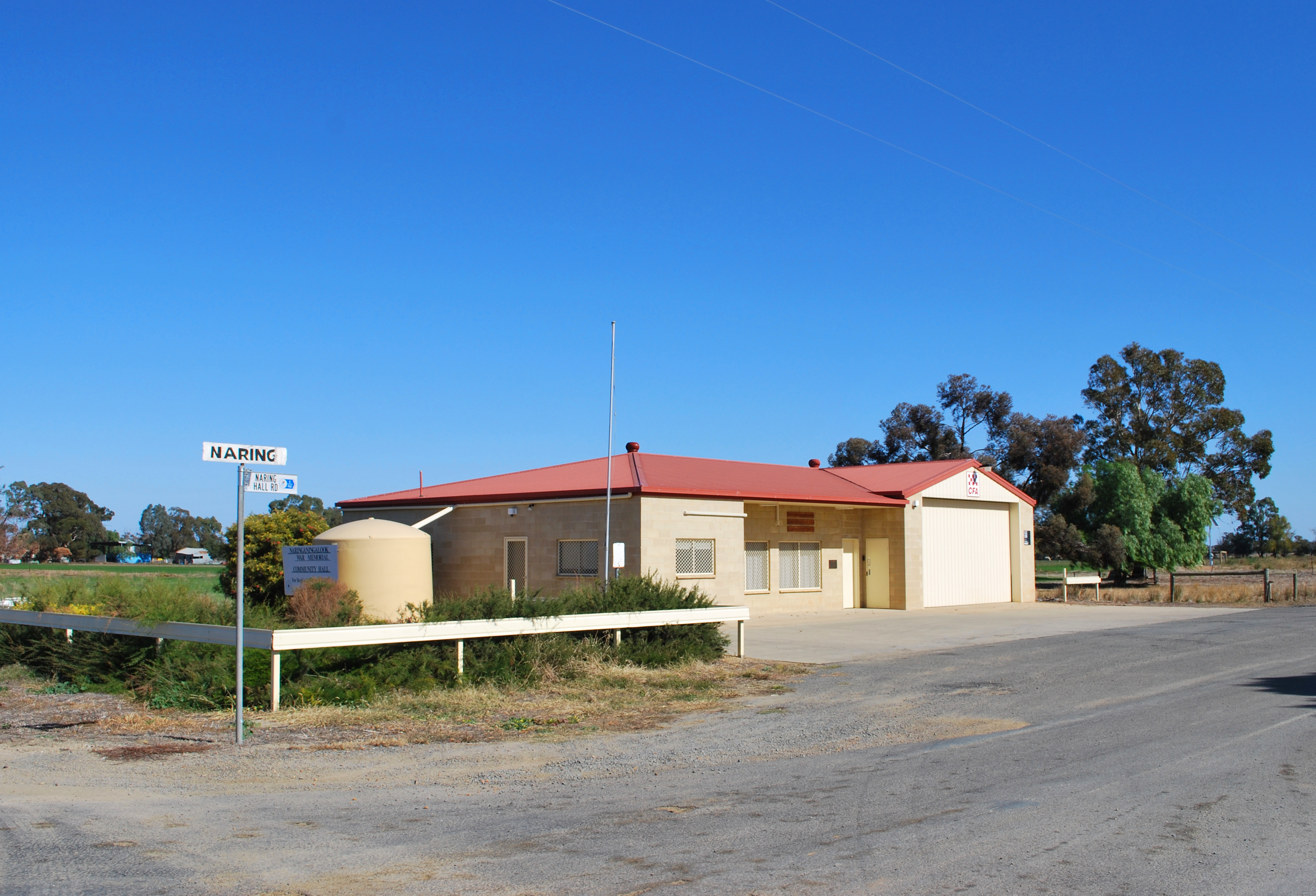
- Naring War Memorial Community Hall

- Coordinates: 36°03′41″S 145°34′39″E
- Country: Australia
- State: Victoria
- Region: Hume
- LGA: Shire of Moira

Government
  - State electorate: Ovens Valley
  - Federal division: Nicholls

Population
  - Total: 122 (2021)
- Postcode: 3636
Localities around Naring
Katunga	Katunga	Muckatah
Numurkah	Naring	Katamatite
Numurkah	Invergordon	Katamatite

Naring is a locality in northern Victoria, Australia. The locality includes the former locality of Naringaningalook. It is in the local government area of Shire of Moira.

Naringaningalook West post office opened on 8 September 1914 and was closed on 27 February 1965. Naringaningalook East post office opened on 8 September 1914 and was closed on 14 December 1915.
