= Katamatite =

- Town
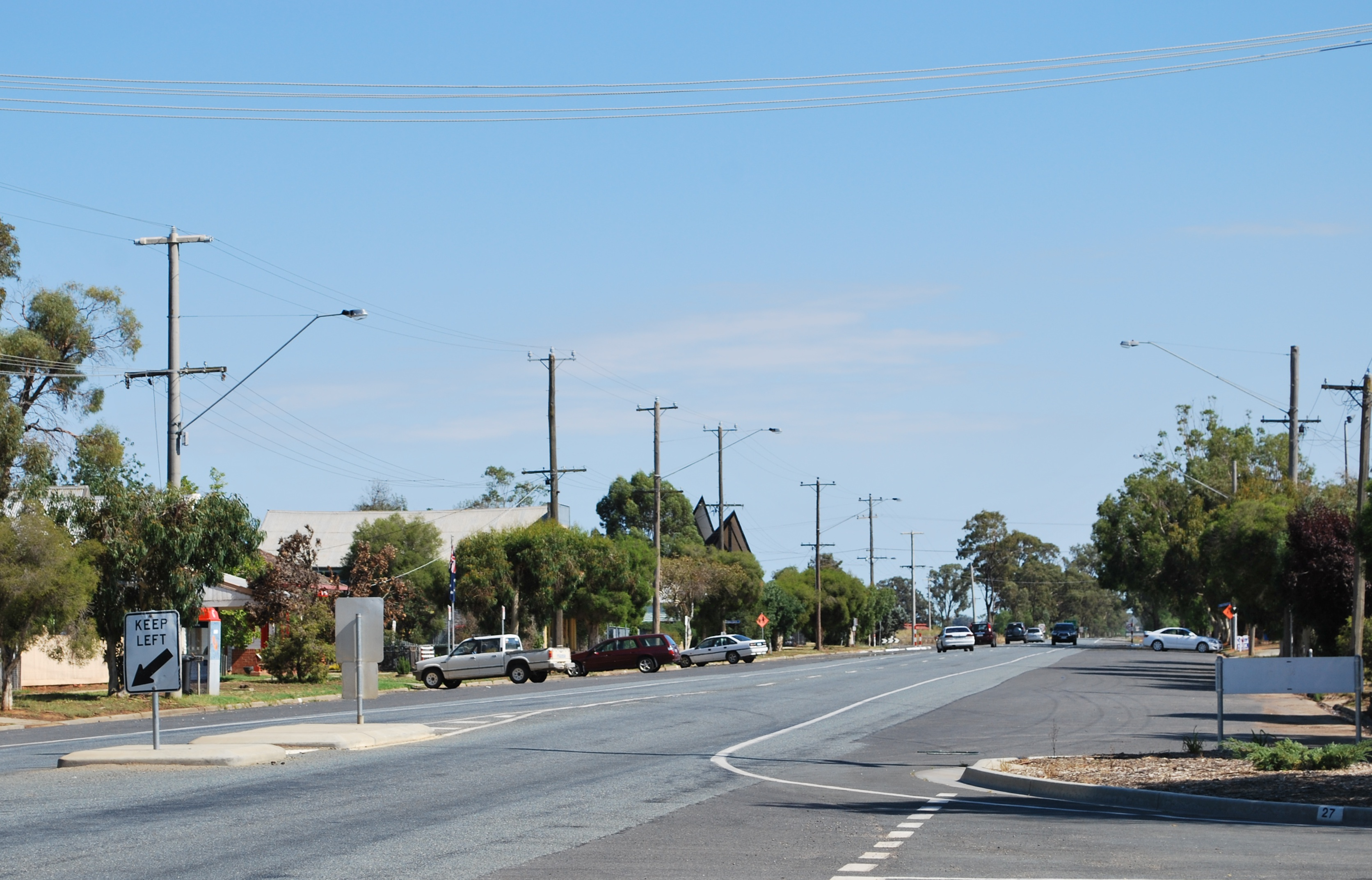
- Beek St, the main street of Katamatite

- Interactive map of Katamatite
- Coordinates: 36°05′S 145°41′E
- Country: Australia
- State: Victoria
- Region: Hume
- LGA: Shire of Moira
- Location: 224 km (139 mi) from Melbourne; 46 km (29 mi) from Shepparton; 20 km (12 mi) from Cobram
- Established: 1876

Government
  - State electorate: Ovens Valley
  - Federal division: Nicholls

Population
  - Total: 453 (2021 census)
- Postcode: 3649
- Mean max temp: 19.1 °C (66.4 °F)
- Mean min temp: 14 °C (57 °F)
- Annual rainfall: 390 mm (15 in)
Localities around Katamatite
Muckatah	Muckatah	Cobram East
Naring	Katamatite	Katamatite East
Invergordon	Youanmite	Youarang

Katamatite is a town in Victoria, Australia about 46 kilometres north east of Shepparton. At the 2021 census, Katamatite had a population of 453.

Katamatite is located in the Murray Valley irrigation area. Township buildings were erected in 1877 and the Post Office opened on 1 December 1877. The township's name comes from the Kwat Kwat people and was the name of a creek. It was possibly pronounced "eet" rather than "ite."

The town has an Australian rules football team competing in the Picola & District Football League. The team received publicity and notoriety back in 1925, when they defeated Wattville 78.19 (487) to 1.3 (9), in an attempt to win the minor premiership on percentage from Dookie.

== Notable people ==
- Winner of the 1995 Stawell Gift : Glenn Crawford
- V.F.L/A.F.L. footballer Darren Flanigan played in the ruck in a losing 1989 A.F.L. Grand Final against Hawthorn. He played 130 A.F.L. games for Geelong (1981–91) kicking 50 goals and 8 games for St Kilda (1992) kicking 4 goals.
- V.F.L./A.F.L. footballer Gary Cameron played 26 games with Geelong (1987–90) kicking 18 goals. Gary went on to coach South Adelaide for (4) games in 2007.
- A.F.L. footballer Sam Wright played 136 games for North Melbourne, kicking 58 goals.
- Identical twin brothers Rod and Don Kilgour are both local media personalities that grew up in Katamatite. Born in 1946, they attended Katamatite primary school and Numurkah High School. They undertook studies at Lee Murray Announcing College in Melbourne and after Don had 2 years at 3UL Warragul and Rod had 2 years at 3YB Warrnambool the twins worked at Radio 3SR Shepparton with Rod as the breakfast announcer and Don as sports editor, broadcasting football and commentating on all sports. After 5 years on Radio 3SR they became sports announcers on GMV6 Television and presented sports news for 18 years. Rod ran an office equipment business in Shepparton whilst Don Kilgour entered Victorian Parliament as the Member for Shepparton from 1991 until 2002. Both twins were involved in sport and the community. Don was awarded an OAM in 2018 for service to the community and was inducted into the City of Greater Shepparton Sports Hall of Fame for his contribution to sports promotion.

== See also ==
- Katamatite Football Club
