= Kaarimba =

- Town
- Coordinates: 36°08′53″S 145°17′43″E
- Country: Australia
- State: Victoria
- Region: Hume
- LGA: Shire of Moira

Government
  - State electorate: Shepparton
  - Federal division: Nicholls

Population
  - Total: 85 (2016 census)
- Postcode: 3635
Localities around Kaarimba
Nathalia	Yielima	Yalca
Kotupna	Kaarimba	Mundoona
Undera	Bunbartha	Tallygaroopna

Kaarimba (also unofficially known as Karimba) is a locality in Victoria, Australia in the local government area of the Shire of Moira.

The Goulburn River borders the south-west of the locality. Karimba Post Office, spelt with one 'A', opened on the 15 January 1877 and was closed on the 21 June 1946.
