= Katandra =

- Town
- Coordinates: 36°14′51″S 145°35′43″E
- Country: Australia
- State: Victoria
- Region: Hume
- LGA: City of Greater Shepparton

Government
  - State electorate: Shepparton
  - Federal division: Nicholls

Population
  - Total: 120 (2021 census)
- Postcode: 3634

Katandra is a locality in the City of Greater Shepparton, Victoria, Australia.

== Sports and Recreation ==
The Katandra Soccer Club defeated Shepparton East - B to win the 1932 Goulburn Valley Soccer League premiership on penalties.

== Notable people ==
- David Teague, former Australian rules football player and coach
- Lachlan Ash, Australian rules footballer.

== Links ==
- Katandra Football Club
