= Dookie, Victoria =

Dookie
- Town
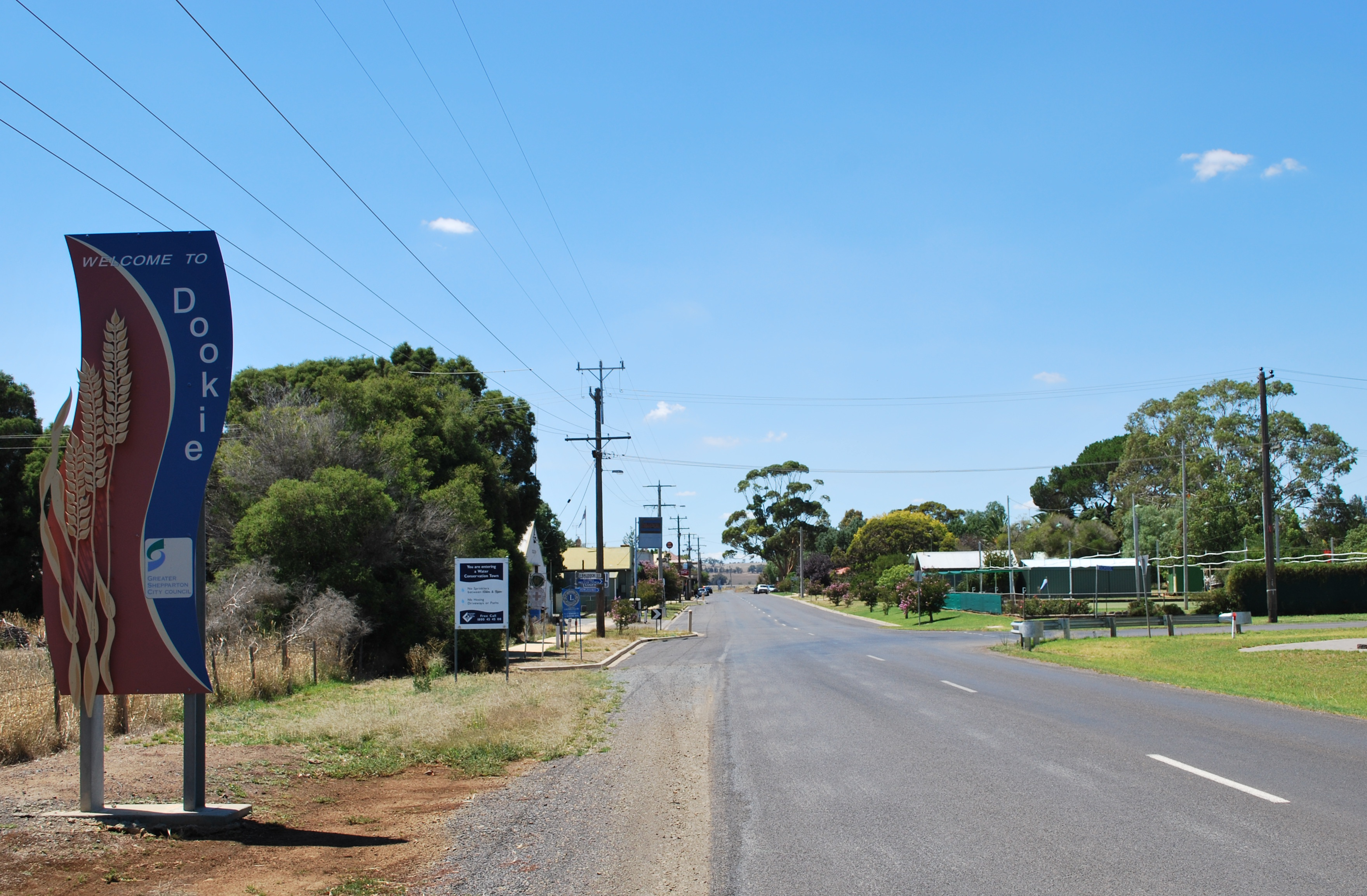
- Entering Dookie

- Interactive map of Dookie
- Coordinates: 36°20′0″S 145°42′0″E
- Country: Australia
- State: Victoria
- Region: Hume
- LGA: City of Greater Shepparton
- Location: 220 km (140 mi) N of Melbourne; 29 km (18 mi) E of Shepparton; 42 km (26 mi) W of Benalla

Government
  - State electorate: Shepparton
  - Federal division: Nicholls
- Elevation: 189 m (620 ft)

Population
  - Total: 333 (2021 census)
- Postcode: 3629
- Mean max temp: 20.8 °C (69.4 °F)
- Mean min temp: 9.4 °C (48.9 °F)
- Annual rainfall: 551.4 mm (21.71 in)

Dookie (/ˈduːki/) is a town in the Goulburn Valley region of Victoria, Australia. It is situated in a valley between Mount Major and Mount Saddleback. Dookie is a farming community. At the 2021 census, Dookie had a population of 333.

Dookie is five minutes by car from Dookie College, jointly managed by the Goulburn Ovens Institute of TAFE and University of Melbourne since 2005. Dookie has many sporting and community groups as well as a cycling track, the Dookie rail trail. The rail trail was opened by the mayor of Greater Shepparton, Michael Polan, in 2012.

The post office opened around February 1878, was replaced by Dookie Railway Station office in 1888 when the railway arrived, which was then renamed Dookie in 1901.

Dookie United Football Club, an Australian rules football team competing in the Picola & District Football League, is based in the town.

The town also has a film society of 75 members who meet monthly at the Dookie Memorial Hall. The film society is a member of the FVFS (Federation of Victorian Film Societies).

== Gallery ==
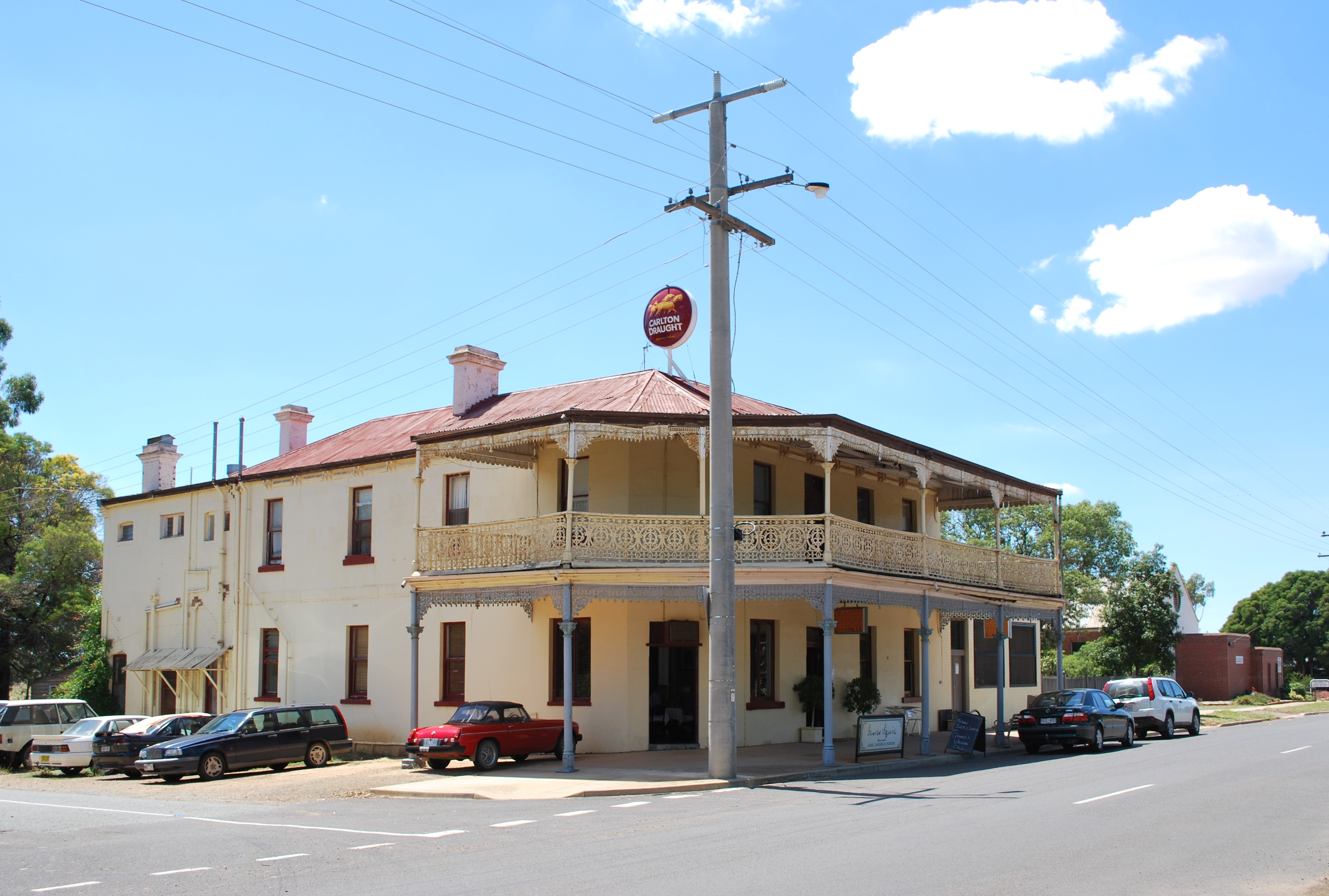
Gladstone Hotel

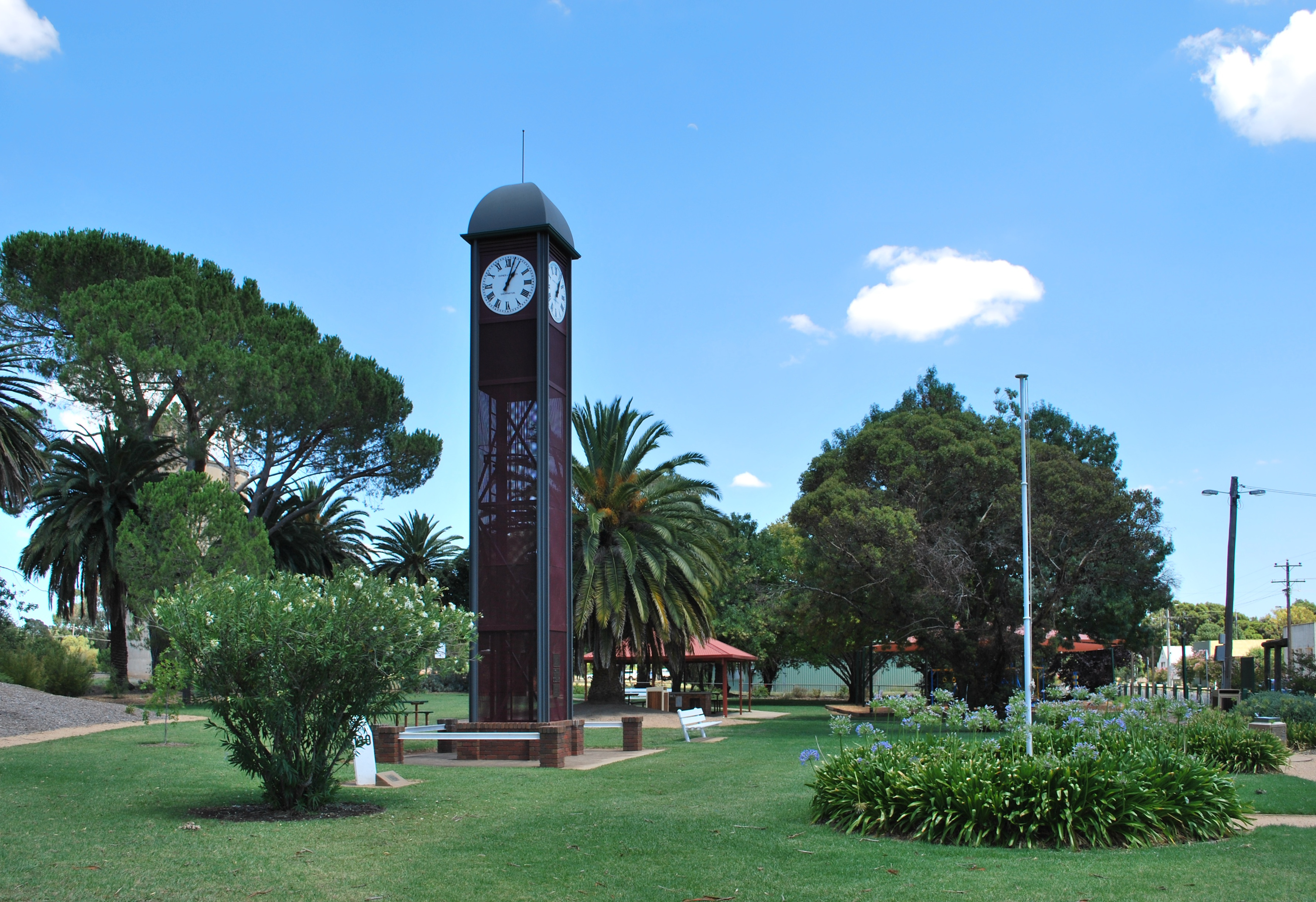
Park in the centre of town

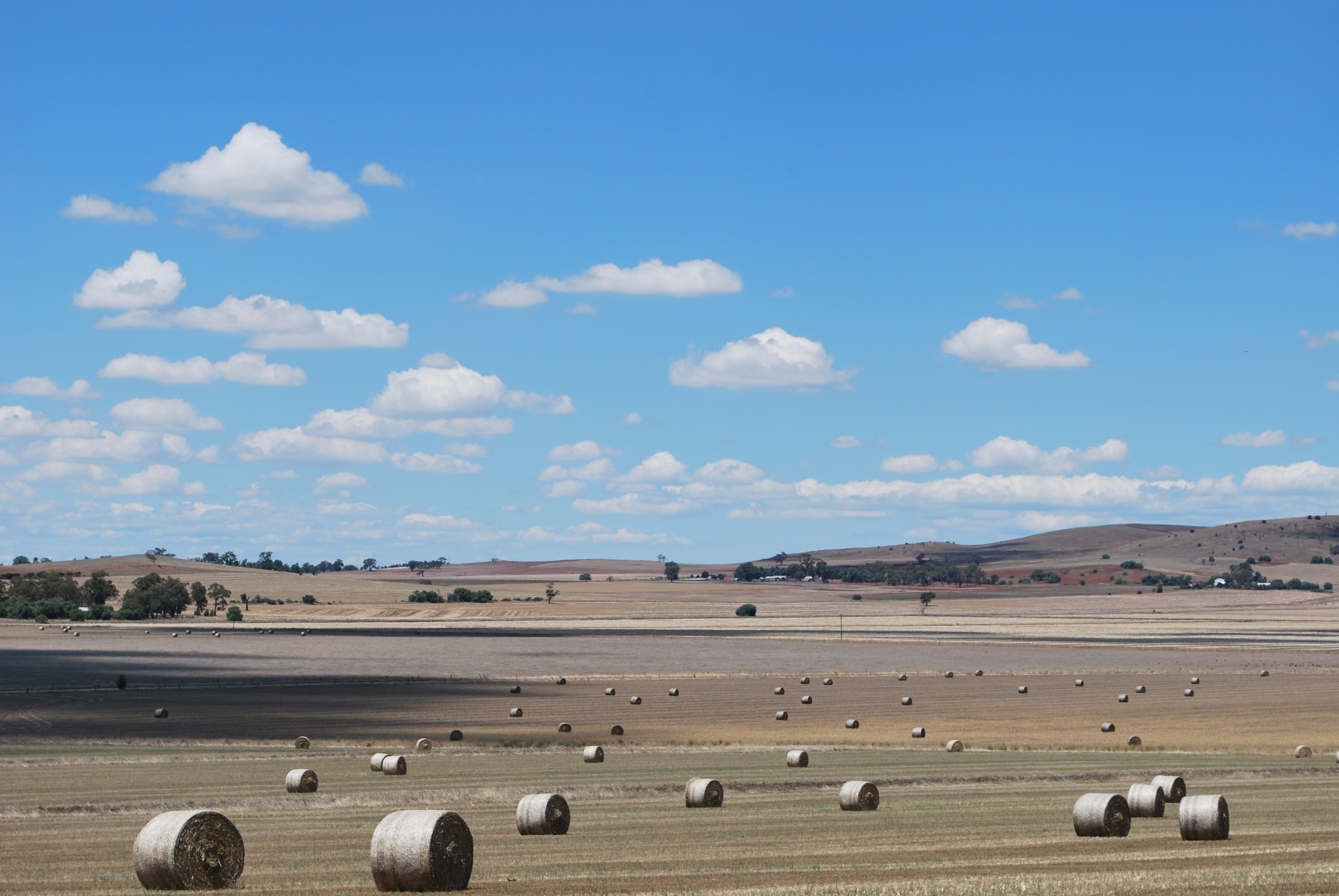
Plains to the east of the town

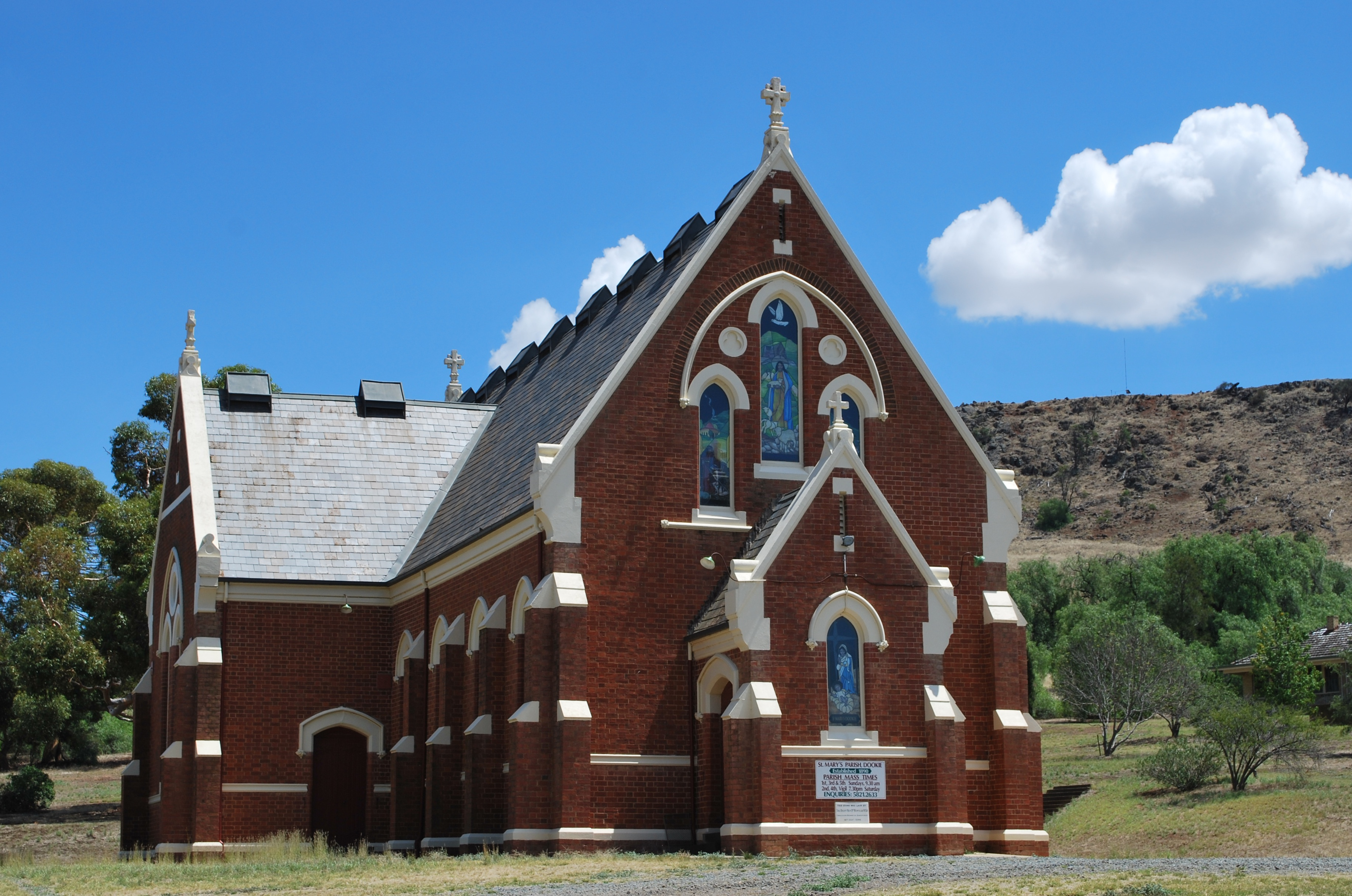
St Mary's Roman Catholic church
