= County of Rodney, Victoria =

Coordinates: 36°30′S 145°00′E

Rodney
- Cadastral division
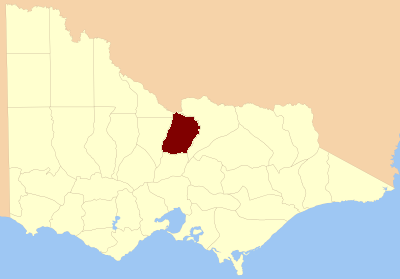
- Location in Victoria
- Country: Australia
- State: Victoria
- Established: 24 February 1871

Area
  - Total: 4,400 km^{2} (1,700 sq mi)
Lands administrative divisions around Rodney
Gunbower	Cadell (NSW)	Moira
Bendigo	Rodney	Moira
Bendigo	Dalhousie	Moira

The County of Rodney is one of the 37 counties of Victoria which are part of the cadastral divisions of Australia, used for land titles. It is located between the Goulburn River in the east, and the Campaspe River in the west, with a small part of the Murray River to the north. Puckapunyal is near its southern edge. The former electoral district of Rodney was in a similar area.

== Parishes ==
Parishes include:

- Bailieston, Victoria
- Bonn, Victoria
- Burnewang, Victoria
- Burramboot, Victoria
- Burramboot East, Victoria
- Campaspe, Victoria
- Carag Carag, Victoria
- Cherrington, Victoria
- Colbinabbin, Victoria
- Coomboona, Victoria
- Cornella, Victoria
- Corop, Victoria
- Crosbie, Victoria
- Dargile, Victoria
- Echuca North, Victoria
- Echuca South, Victoria
- Girgarre, Victoria
- Girgarre East, Victoria
- Gobarup, Victoria
- Kanyapella, Victoria
- Koyuga, Victoria
- Kyabram, Victoria
- Kyabram East, Victoria
- Moora, Victoria
- Mooroopna, Victoria
- Mooroopna West, Victoria
- Murchison, Victoria
- Murchison North, Victoria
- Muskerry, Victoria
- Nanneella, Victoria
- Noorilim, Victoria
- Redcastle, Victoria
- Rochester, Victoria
- Runnymede, Victoria
- Taripta, Victoria
- Timmering, Victoria
- Tongala, Victoria
- Toolamba, Victoria
- Toolamba West, Victoria
- Toolleen, Victoria
- Undera, Victoria
- Wanalta, Victoria
- Waranga, Victoria
- Weston, Victoria
- Whroo, Victoria
- Wirrate, Victoria
- Wyuna, Victoria
