= Milloo =

- Town
- Coordinates: 36°21′25″S 144°22′47″E
- Country: Australia
- State: Victoria
- LGAs: Shire of Campaspe; Shire of Loddon

Government
  - State electorate: Murray Plains
  - Federal divisions: Mallee; Nicholls

Population
  - Total: 37 (2021 census)
- Postcode: 3572

Milloo is a locality in the Shire of Loddon and the Shire of Campaspe, Victoria, Australia. At the 2021 census, Milloo had a population of 37.
