= Girgarre =

- Town
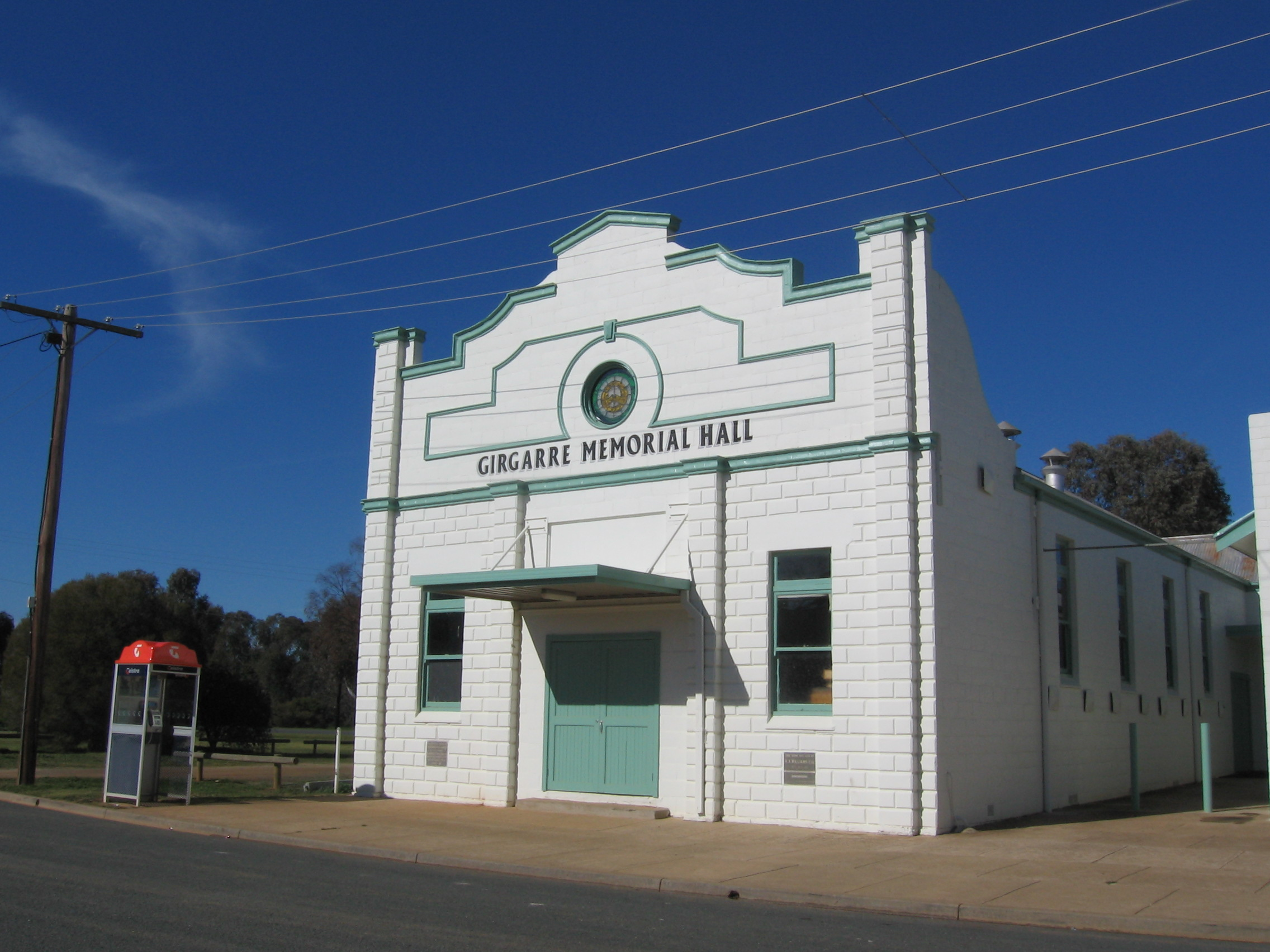
- Memorial Hall

- Interactive map of Girgarre
- Coordinates: 36°23′56″S 144°58′51″E
- Country: Australia
- State: Victoria
- LGA: Shire of Campaspe
- Location: 158 km (98 mi) N of Melbourne; 38 km (24 mi) W of Shepparton; 11 km (6.8 mi) S of Kyabram; 6 km (3.7 mi) N of Stanhope

Government
  - State electorate: Euroa
  - Federal division: Nicholls

Population
  - Total: 563 (2021 census)
- Postcode: 3624
Localities around Girgarre
Timmering	Tongala	Willowdene
	Girgarre	Cooma
Corop	Stanhope	Girgarre East

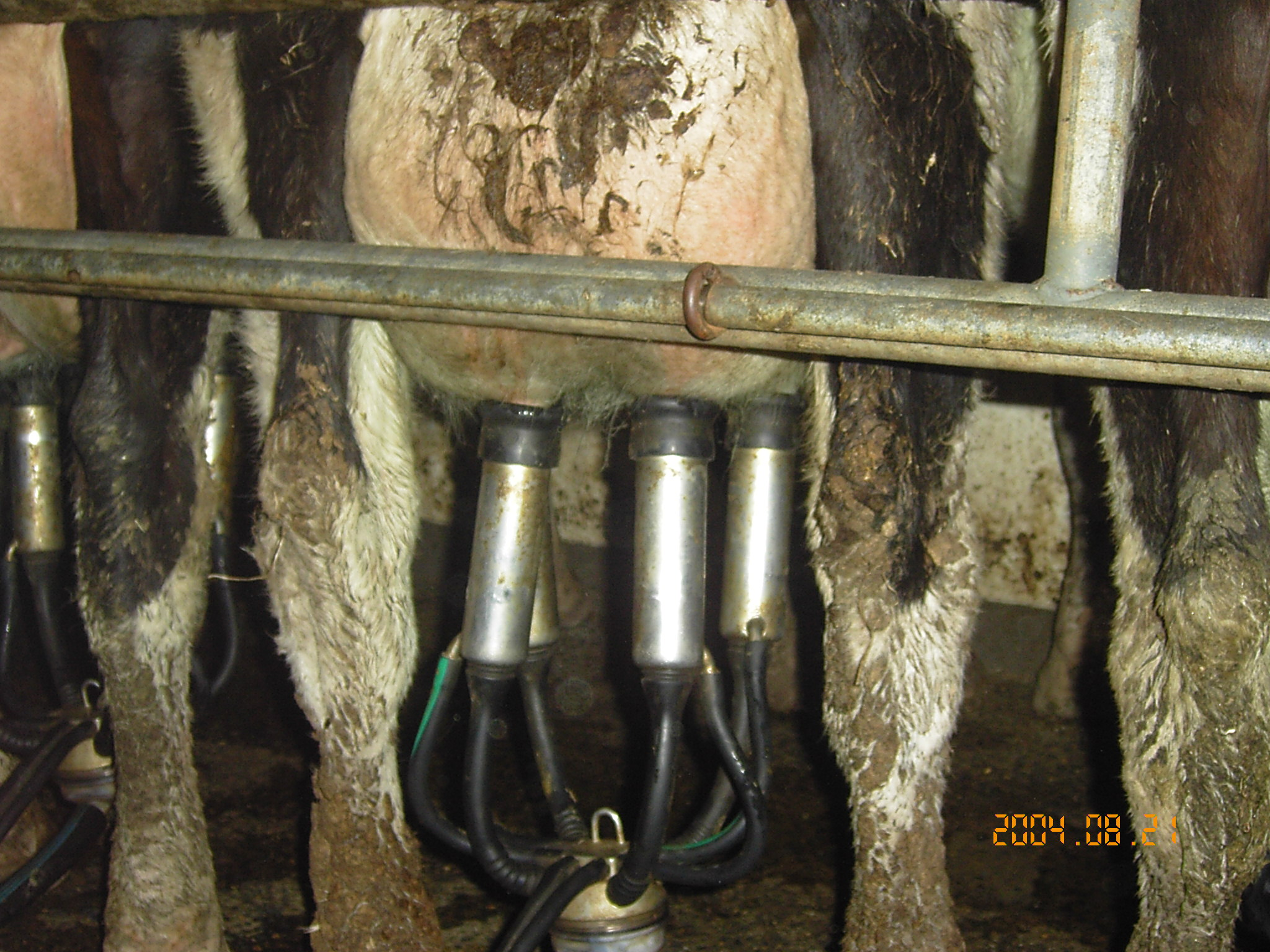
Dairying is the major industry in Girgarre. Modern milking techniques are widespread.

Girgarre (/ɡɜːrˈɡæri/ gur-GARRY) is a town in the Goulburn Valley, Victoria, Australia. It is in the Shire of Campaspe local government area. At the 2021 census, Girgarre had a population of 563.

== History ==
The Post Office opened on 21 May 1917 as Stanhope North, and was renamed Girgarre in 1920.

A railway branch line from Rushworth opened in 1917. The line was closed back to Stanhope in 1975, and the branch was closed completely in 1987. There is now a short rail trail from Girgarre towards Stanhope, and a facsimile station and rail track at Girgarre.

Girgarre Kindergarten was established in 1964. It has operated out of several locations within the town. Currently the kindergarten operates out of the old Primary School Principal's home. The Kindergarten is celebrating its 50-year anniversary in 2014 with several events planned throughout the year.

The Girgarre Community Centre was established in 1984 and is operated by the Girgarre Community Group Inc. A not for profit organisation that operates largely through the significant contribution of volunteers.

== Today ==
The main industry in Girgarre is dairying, mainly on family owned farms.

Girgarre has a primary school, kindergarten, milk bar/post office, and a V/Line bus stop. It is 18.9 km and 17 minutes drive from the larger town of Kyabram, and 38.6 km and 33 minutes drive to Shepparton.

Until early 2012, Girgarre was home to a large Heinz tomato sauce factory, a significant regional employer. Waste water from the factory was made available for farmers for irrigation and stock use.

On 27 May 2011 Heinz announced it would close the Girgarre sauce factory. Heinz also announced job losses for its factories in Northgate (Brisbane), and Wagga Wagga. Heinz said it expected to complete the lay-offs within 12 months. On 6 January 2012, Heinz closed its Girgarre factory as announced in 2011. 146 workers lost their jobs. It was the second to last tomato sauce factory in Australia, and Heinz's last. The plant equipment was moved to a factory in New Zealand.

A local group sought to purchase the factory and start its own production, with offers of financial assistance from investors. Heinz rejected the offer.

In 2013 Resource Recovery purchased the facility and it became a recycling operation. It received packaged food and beverages, the packaging was recycled. The food and beverages converted into stockfeed. In August 2018 a proposal for an upgrade to an organic waste-to-energy plant for the site went before Campaspe Shire Council.

There are a few local sports clubs and programs, including for football, cricket, tennis and netball . Girgarre Football Club (the "Kangaroos") is the local football team. Sunbury ring-in Joshua Marino professes to be the best footballer the town has seen in recent history.

One of the most popular additions to the town has been a local farmers market, held on the second Sunday of every month in the park at the rear of the Town Hall. Hundreds of people come from near and far to shop at the market which features an excellent range of local produce, crafts and a well attended popular live poultry auction.

The town has a Community Cottage which provides training opportunities and produces the local newspaper, the Girgarre Gazette. The Gazette is produced monthly with features including local news, along with news from the wider district and the state. The Community Cottage also operates the Community Car, driven by volunteers, which ensures people within the district are able to attend appointments - both locally and in Bendigo and Melbourne. The community has a very strong sense of self and has a strong volunteer base.

== Moosic Muster ==
The town is known for its free yearly 'Girgarre Moosic Muster', catering to all tastes in music. First run in 2007 as a 2 day event, in 2019 it was extended to 4 days. Held in mid-January, the 2019 Muster featured:

... free music entertainment, a doubling of open mic time for all aspiring stars, nearly 40 workshops, a ukulele extravaganza of performances and tutorials and the Saturday night headline will be staged at the spectacular new Gargarro Gardens Soundshell.

Tutors lead the workshops in a wide variety of instruments, singing, songwriting and associated skills. The only charge was for camping, but the fee included three meals and use of amenities over the entire muster period. There is also a children's program.

In 2020 the Muster was held over 5 days on 8−12 January. The 15th Muster, originally set for 6−10 January 2021, was postponed until 21−25 April.
