= Rodney County (disambiguation) =

Rodney County may refer to:

- Rodney County, New Zealand
- Rodney County, Queensland, Australia
- County of Rodney, Victoria, Australia
