= Corop =

- Town
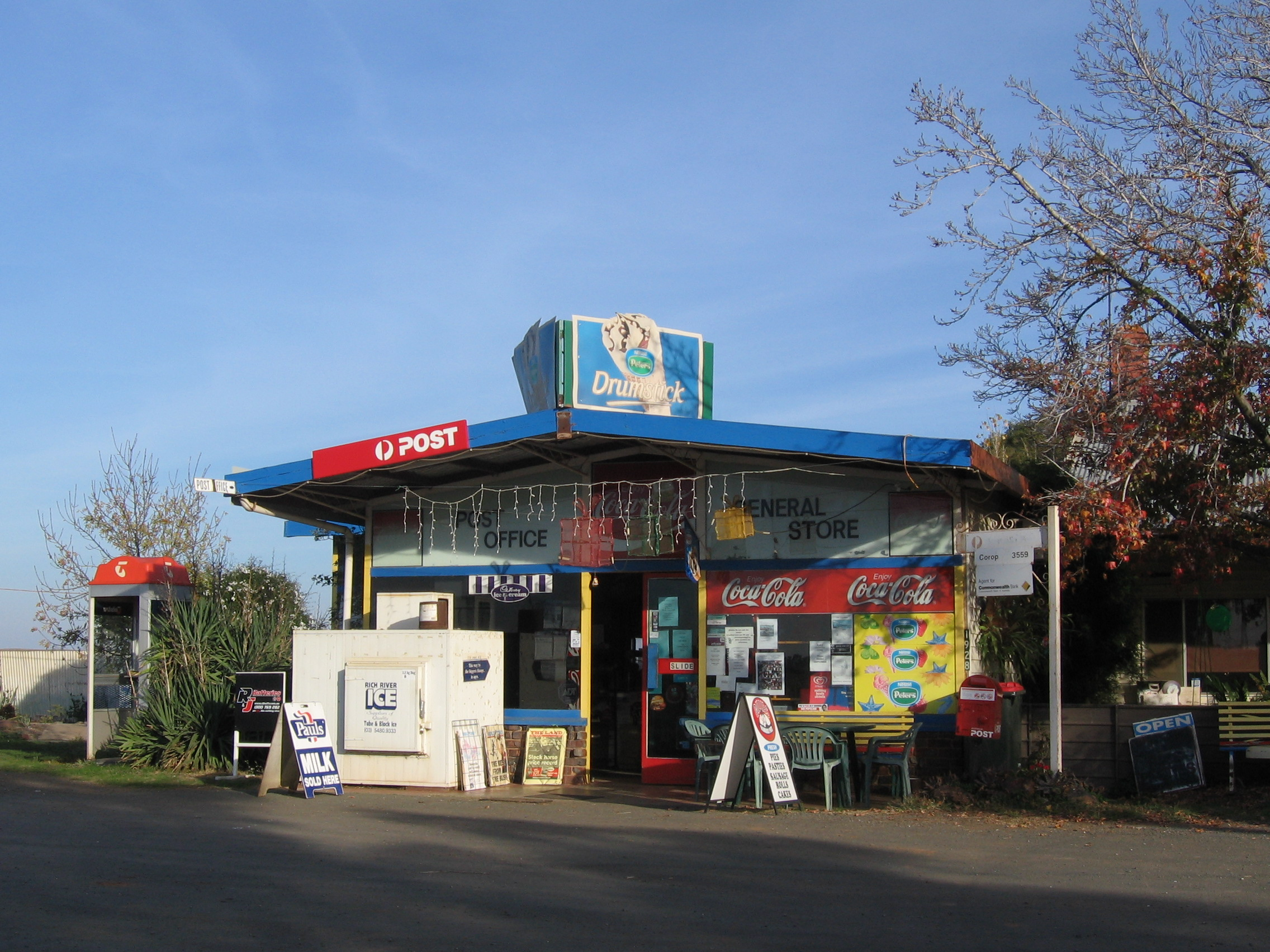
- General store

- Interactive map of Corop
- Coordinates: 36°27′0″S 144°47′0″E
- Country: Australia
- State: Victoria
- LGA: Shire of Campaspe
- Location: 178 km (111 mi) N of Melbourne; 55 km (34 mi) W of Shepparton; 20 km (12 mi) e of Elmore; 17 km (11 mi) W of Stanhope

Government
  - State electorates: Euroa; Murray Plains
  - Federal division: Nicholls

Population
  - Total: 161 (2021 census)
- Postcode: 3559
Localities around Corop
Bonn	Nanneella	Girgarre
Burnewang	Corop	Carag Carag
Runnymede	Burramboot	Burramboot

Corop is a town in the Goulburn Valley region of Victoria, Australia. The town is in the Shire of Campaspe and on the Midland Highway, 178 kilometres (111 mi) north of the state capital, Melbourne. At the 2016 census, Corop and the surrounding area had a population of 129, while the town itself claims a population of 33.

Near the town are Lake Cooper and Greens Lake, both popular venues for aquatic activities. The town is home to as many holiday homes as permanent dwellings and the town is much larger in holiday times.

Corop Post Office opened on 1 January 1868.

== Sport ==
In 1905, Corop Football Club played in the Elmore District Football Association and finished last. Corop joined the Campaspe Football League in 1933. Corop then joined the Kyabram District Football League in 1936, finished last, then disbanded prior to the 1937 season.
