= Nanneella =

- Town
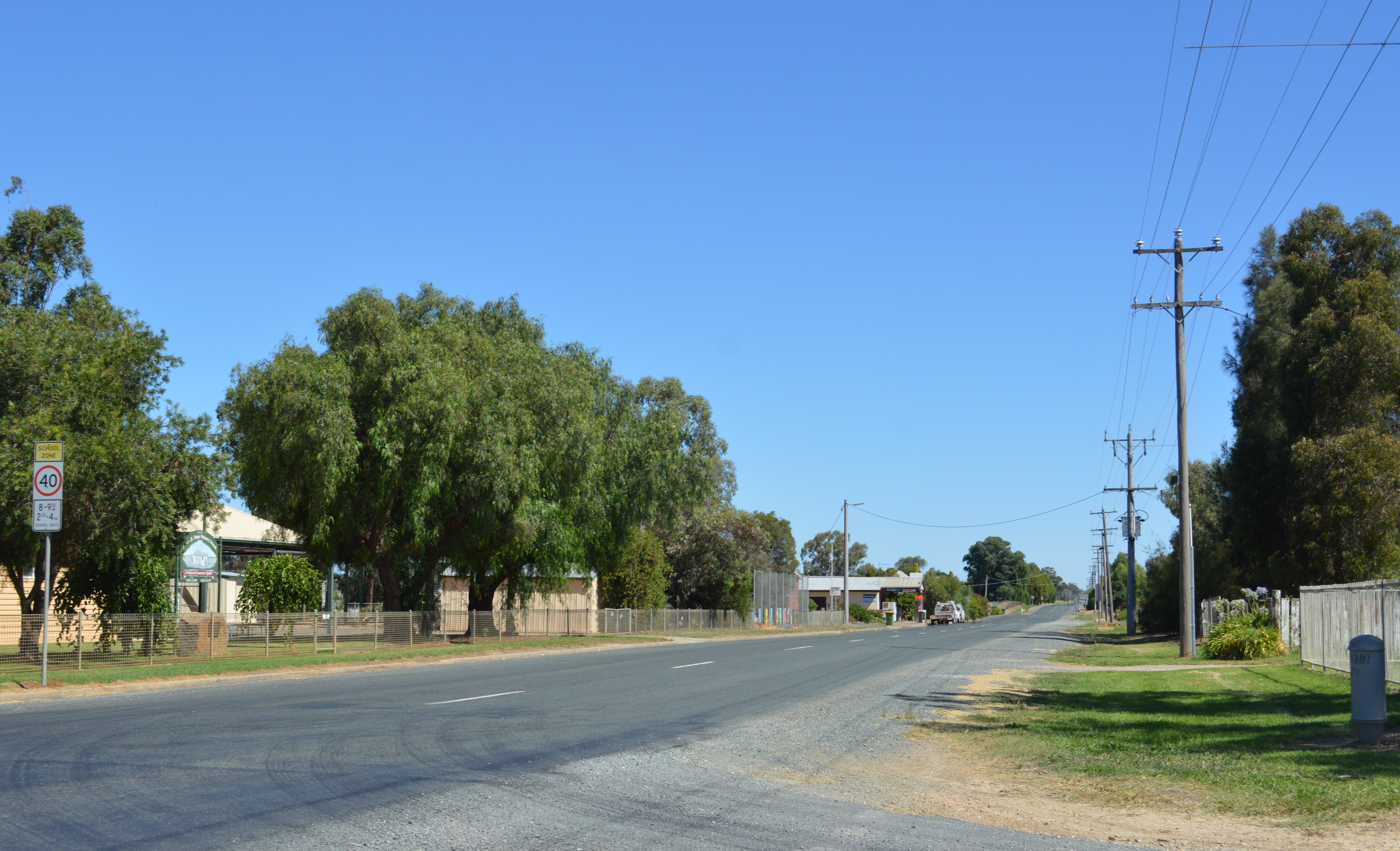
- Main street of Nanneella

- Interactive map of Nanneella
- Coordinates: 36°18′50″S 144°46′41″E
- Country: Australia
- State: Victoria
- LGA: Shire of Campaspe
- Location: 194 km (121 mi) N of Melbourne; 66 km (41 mi) W of Shepparton; 23 km (14 mi) S of Echuca; 12 km (7.5 mi) NE of Rochester

Government
  - State electorate: Murray Plains
  - Federal division: Nicholls

Population
  - Total: 425 (2021 census)
- Postcode: 3561
Localities around Nanneella
	Strathallan	Koyuga
Fairy Dell	Nanneella	Timmering
Bonn	Corop

Nanneella is a town in the Goulburn Valley region of Victoria, Australia. The locality is in the Shire of Campaspe, 194 kilometres (121 mi) north of the state capital, Melbourne.

At the 2021 census, Nanneella had a population of 425.
