= Colbinabbin =

- Town
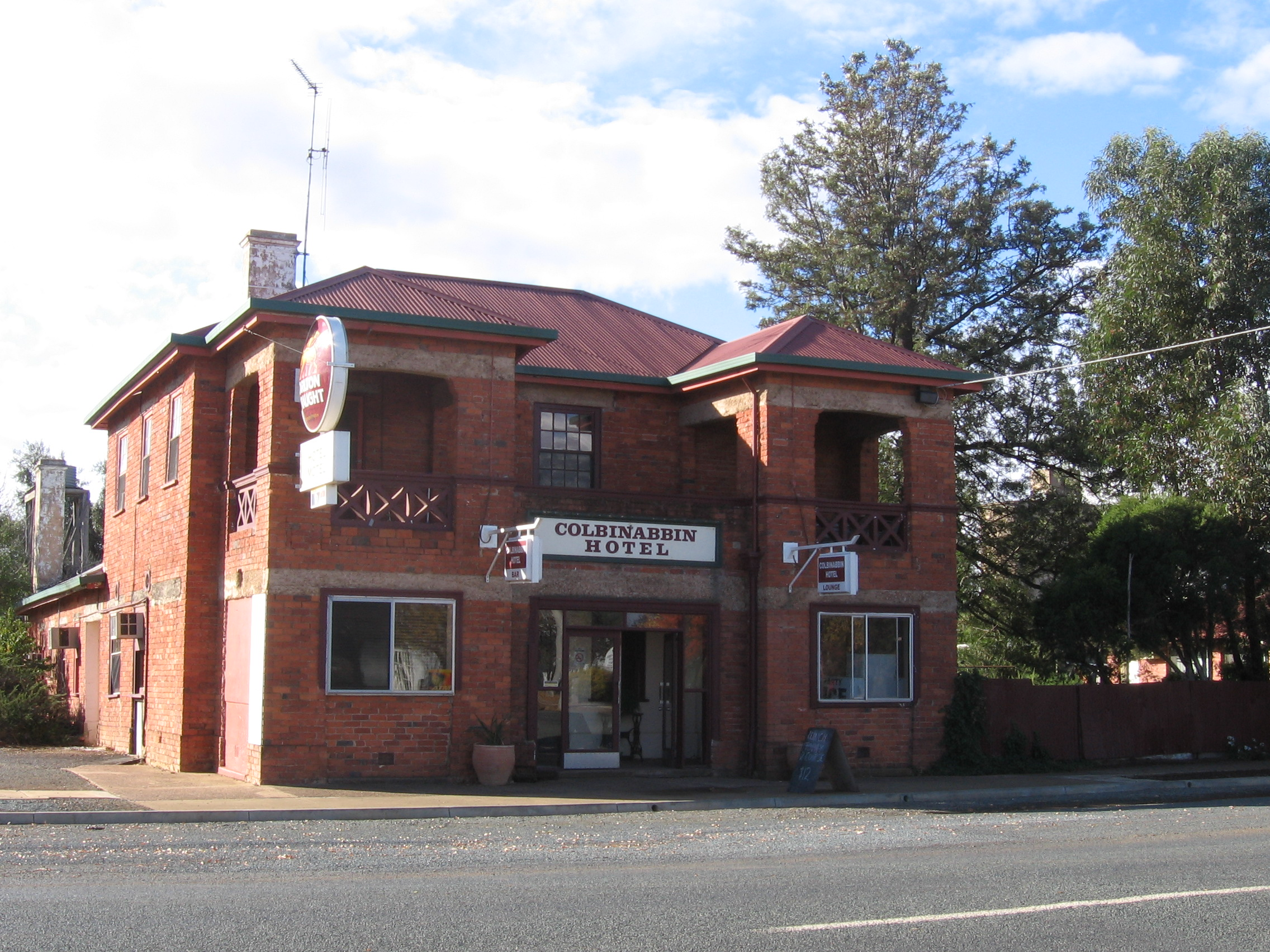
- Colbinabbin Hotel

- Interactive map of Colbinabbin
- Coordinates: 36°36′0″S 144°49′0″E
- Country: Australia
- State: Victoria
- LGA: Shire of Campaspe
- Location: 151 km (94 mi) N of Melbourne; 59 km (37 mi) NE of Bendigo; 70 km (43 mi) W of Shepparton; 24 km (15 mi) SE of Elmore; 22 km (14 mi) W of Rushworth

Government
  - State electorate: Euroa
  - Federal division: Nicholls

Population
  - Total: 285 (2021 census)
- Postcode: 3559
Localities around Colbinabbin
Runnymede	Burramboot	Burramboot
Myola	Colbinabbin	Wanalta
Toolleen	Cornella	Gobarup

Colbinabbin /ˈkɒlbɪnæbən/ is a town in the Shire of Campaspe Victoria, Australia. At the 2021 census, Colbinabbin had a population of 285.

== History ==
The name is derived from a Ngurai-illamwurrung word meaning "the meeting of the black and red soils". Located on the banks of Cornella Creek, Colbinabbin was first settled in the 1850s. A township was established in the 1870s, the Post Office opening on 9 August 1872.

In the 1930s the area had significant change with the construction of the Waranga - Mallee channel, which bisects the town. Irrigation altered land use to the north of the town and to this day has made it very productive farmland. Cereal cropping and livestock production have been important industries in the Colbinabbin area. Since the late 1960s tomatoes have been produced for processing into sauces and pastes. A local company also specialises in semi-dried tomatoes for the export market.

The town was the terminus for the Rushworth railway line.

== The town today ==
Colbinabbin in recent years has seen five big booms in wine growing and a substantial number of vineyards have been established in the area, especially along the Mount Camel Range, known colloquially as 'The hill'. The red volcanic soil of the Mount Camel Range was formed in Cambrian times and is ideal for grape production. The easterly aspect, irrigation water and warm climate have accelerated this development. Shiraz is the most common variety grown. This area forms part of the Heathcote Wine Region.

Colbinabbin has an active community fielding teams in several sports including the Colbinabbin Football Club, an Australian rules football team playing in the Heathcote District Football League, netball, tennis, lawn bowls and cricket sides.

The town has featured prominently in regional media with the construction of a pipeline connecting the Waranga-Mallee channel to Lake Eppalock and onto Ballarat. This "superpipe" will draw water from the main channel at a location just north of the town. Local opposition to this development was reported on ABC news and a petition against further drawing of water from the Goulburn system was initiated. A protest on 31 August saw the Premier of Victoria, John Brumby, unable to leave the pipeline compound for 75 minutes. This was reported widely in the media, including ABC news and the Herald Sun newspaper. Water from the Goulburn River is diverted at the Goulburn Weir and sent via the Stuart Murray and Cattanach Canals to the Waranga Basin. Approximately 91% of the flow of the Goulburn River is diverted at this point. This provides much of the water that flows along the Waranga Mallee channel that bisects the town.

In 2019 the "Colbinabbin Silo Art Trail" was successful in obtaining funding through the Victorian State Government "Pick My Project" community grants initiative. The painting of the silos took place in 2020.
