= Strathallan, Victoria =

Strathallan Victoria
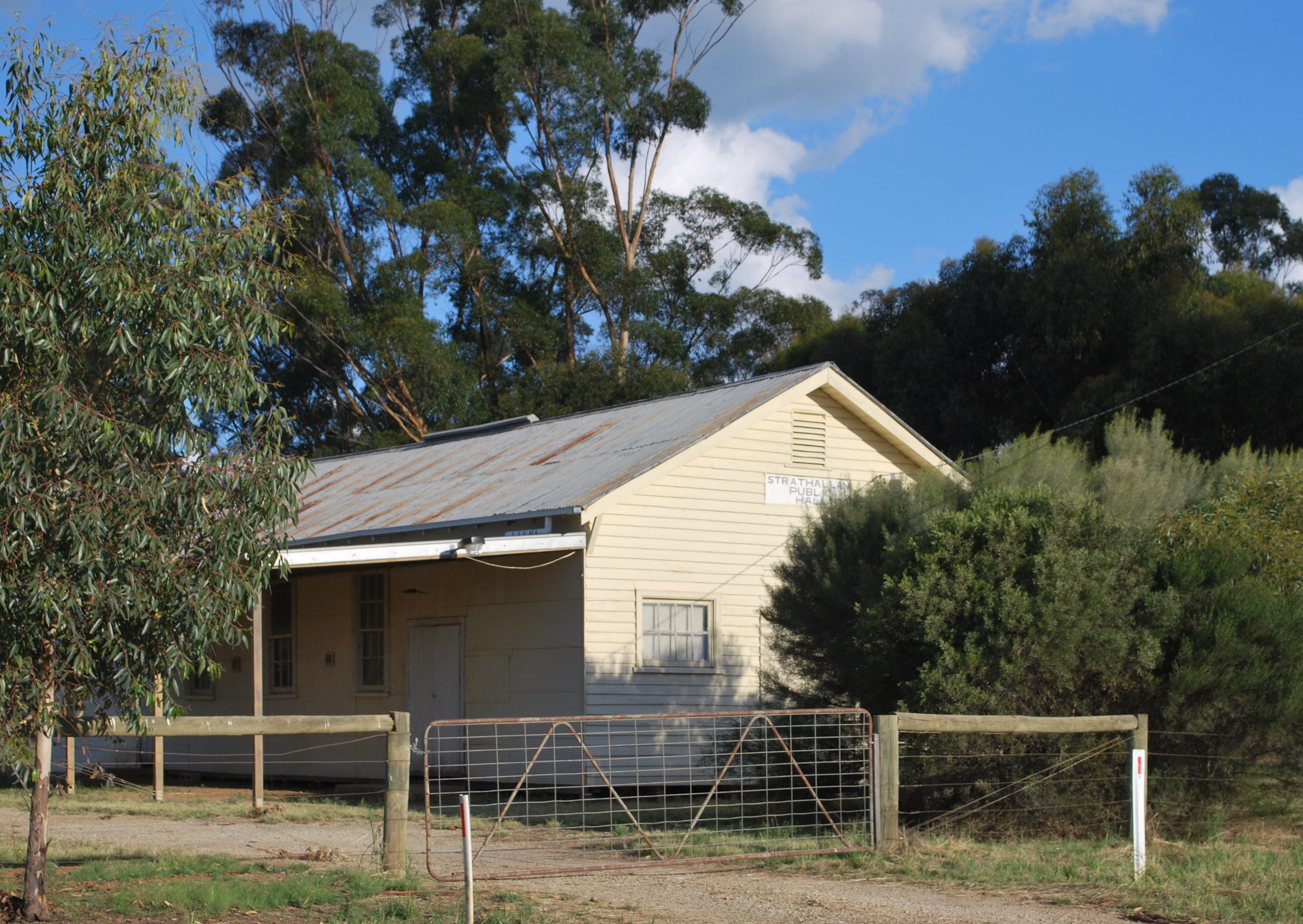
- Strathallan Public Hall

- Coordinates: 36°15′31″S 144°44′35″E
- Population: 144 (2016 census)
- Postcode(s): 3622
- Location: 198 km (123 mi) N of Melbourne; 69 km (43 mi) W of Shepparton; 14 km (9 mi) S of Echuca; 13 km (8 mi) N of Rochester
- LGA(s): Shire of Campaspe
- State electorate(s): Murray Plains
- Federal division(s): Nicholls

Strathallan is a locality in the Goulburn Valley region of Victoria, Australia. The locality is in the Shire of Campaspe, and on the Campaspe River, 198 kilometres (123 mi) north of the state capital, Melbourne.

The "Strathallan" property was located on the Cornelia Creek Estate when the latter was acquired for closer settlement in 1910-11, following the acquisition of the Restdown Estate on the other side of the Campaspe River in 1906. Small rural communities developed on each estate, separated by the river. A new township of Strathallan was surveyed around a new railway siding on the Echuca railway line, and the first lots were sold in December 1912. A bridge over the Campaspe River, along with two smaller bridges over adjacent billabongs, opened in 1913 following a prolonged dispute between the Closer Settlement Board and Shire of Rochester over its cost.

Strathallan State School opened in 1914 and closed c. 1969. A railway station opened in the same year; it has now closed. A postal receiving office opened in November 1913, was upgraded to a post office in June 1915 and closed in November 1967. Strathallan Public Hall opened in 1929 and remains in use today.

At the 2016 census, Strathallan and the surrounding area had a population of 144.
