= Kyvalley =

- Town
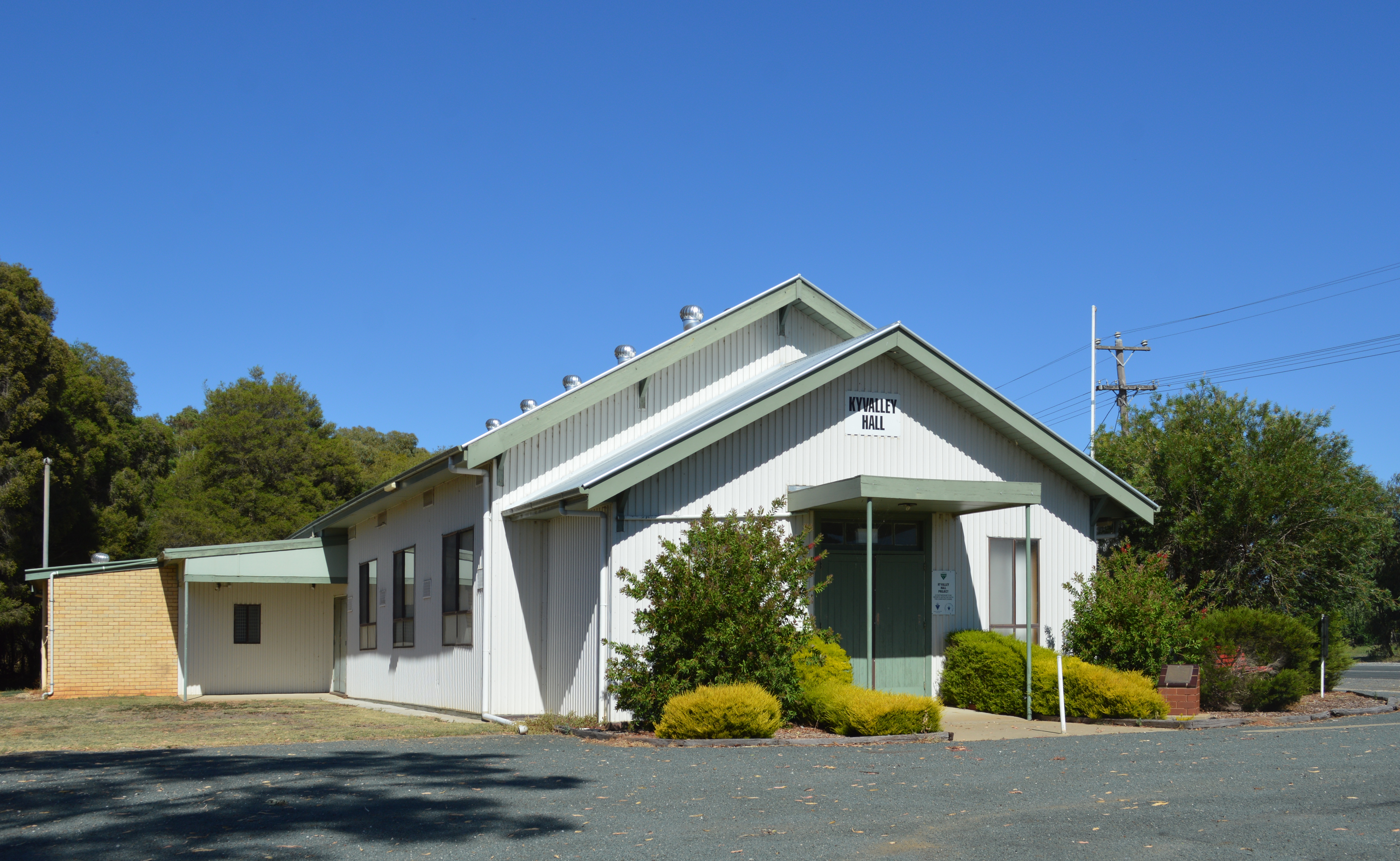
- Kyvalley Hall, 2017

- Coordinates: 36°17′2″S 145°0′21″E
- Country: Australia
- State: Victoria
- LGA: Shire of Campaspe
- Location: 218 km (135 mi) N of Melbourne; 45 km (28 mi) NW of Shepparton; 8 km (5.0 mi) NW of Kyabram

Government
  - State electorate: Murray Plains
  - Federal division: Nicholls

Population
  - Total: 328 (2011 census)
- Postcode: 3621

Kyvalley is a locality in the Goulburn Valley region of Victoria, Australia. The locality is in the Shire of Campaspe, 218 kilometres (135 mi) north of the state capital, Melbourne.

At the 2011 census, Kyvalley and the surrounding area had a population of 328.
