= Koyuga =

- Town
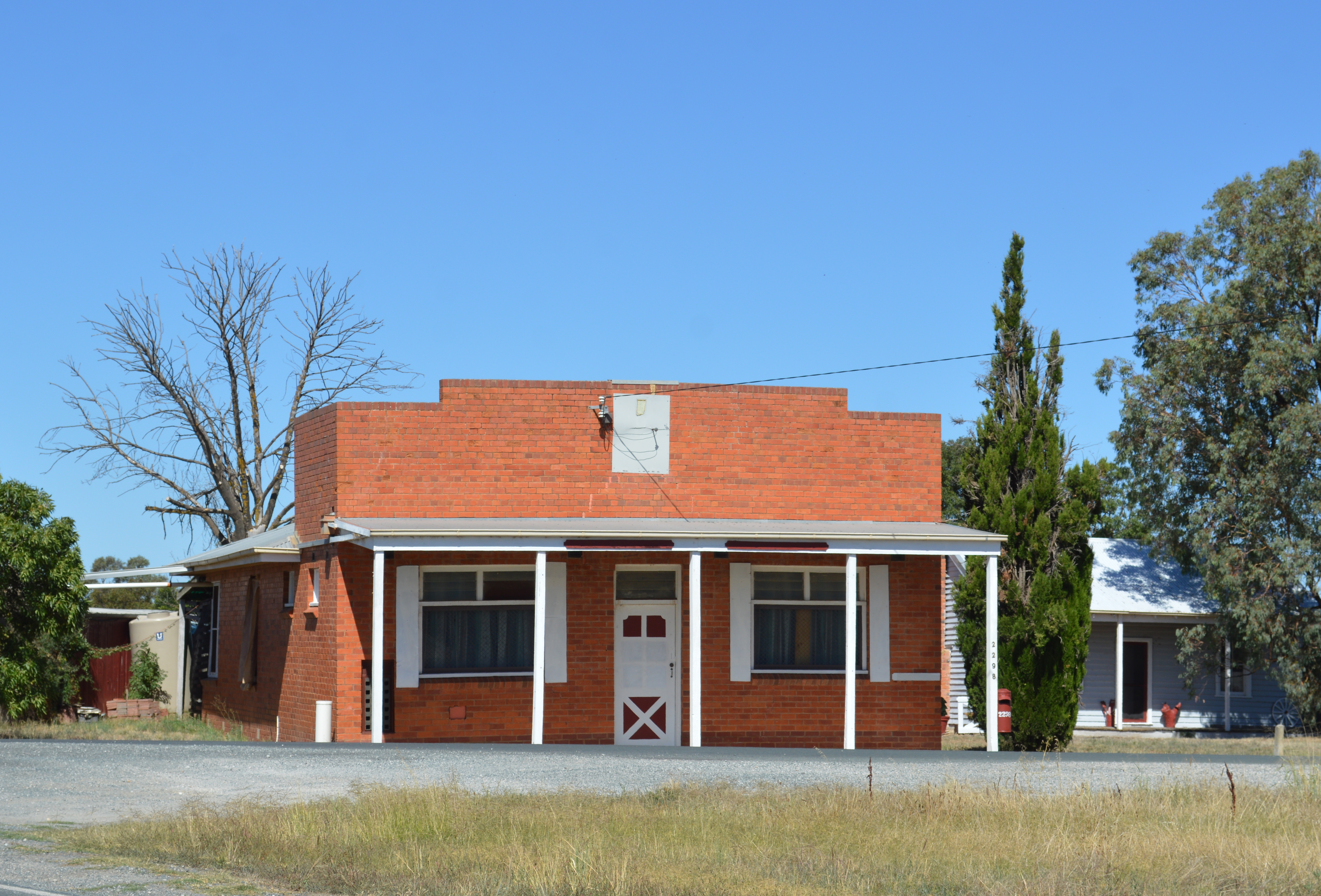
- A building in Koyuga

- Interactive map of Koyuga
- Coordinates: 36°13′17″S 144°53′11″E
- Country: Australia
- State: Victoria
- LGA: Shire of Campaspe
- Location: 212 km (132 mi) N of Melbourne; 57 km (35 mi) NW of Shepparton; 22 km (14 mi) SW of Echuca; 7 km (4.3 mi) NW of Tongala

Government
  - State electorate: Murray Plains
  - Federal division: Nicholls

Population
  - Total: 315 (2016 census)
- Postcode: 3622

Koyuga is a locality in the Goulburn Valley region of Victoria, Australia. The locality is in the Shire of Campaspe, 212 kilometres (132 mi) north of the state capital, Melbourne.

At the 2016 census, Koyuga and the surrounding area had a population of 315.
