= Myola, Victoria =

Myola Victoria
- Coordinates: 36°38′06″S 144°39′10″E
- Population: 7 (2021 census)
- Postcode(s): 3551
- LGA(s): Shire of Campaspe
- State electorate(s): Euroa
- Federal division(s): Nicholls

Myola is a locality in the Shire of Campaspe, Victoria, Australia. At the 2021 census, Myola had a population of 7.

The Northern Highway passes through Myola.
