= Kanyapella =

- Town
- Coordinates: 36°07′32″S 144°52′04″E
- Country: Australia
- State: Victoria
- LGA: Shire of Campaspe

Government
  - State electorate: Euroa
  - Federal division: Nicholls

Population
  - Total: 51 (2021 census)
- Postcode: 3564

Kanyapella is a locality in the Shire of Campaspe, Victoria, Australia, located approximately 12 kilometres east of Echuca.

== Demographics ==
As of the 2021 census Kanyapella had a population of 51 people and 17 families total, a decline from 56 and 19 families in 2016.

== Attractions ==
Billabong Ranch, a tourist attraction offering primarily equestrian-focused recreation is located within Kanyapella. The ranch is accredited by the Victoria Tourism Industry Council.

Kanyapella State Game Reserve is a state-run hunting reserve in southern Kanyapella.
