= Redcastle, Victoria =

Redcastle
- Suburb
- Interactive map of Redcastle
- Coordinates: 36°44′58″S 144°47′9″E
- Country: Australia
- State: Victoria
- City: Bendigo
- LGAs: City of Greater Bendigo; Shire of Campaspe
- Established: 1859

Government
  - State electorate: Euroa
  - Federal divisions: Bendigo; Nicholls

Population
  - Total: 67 (2021 census)
- Postcode: 3523

Redcastle is a locality in the City of Greater Bendigo and the Shire of Campaspe, Victoria, Australia. At the 2021 census, Redcastle had a population of 67.

== History ==
Redcastle was established in 1859 following the discovery of gold in the area and was originally known as the Balmoral Diggings. Located between the McIvor (Heathcote) and Waranga (Rushworth) goldfields, it was an isolated mining site. The name "Redcastle," of Scottish origin, later replaced Balmoral, though the reason for the change remains unknown.

In 1862, a fatal mining accident occurred at Redcastle on Clark's Reef. Two men named Smith and Walters were working in a shaft 175 feet deep when a charge exploded while being tamped with an iron rammer. Smith died a few minutes later. A second explosion occurred at the Hit or Miss Company's works within an hour when a spark ignited a keg of blasting powder, severely burning a shareholder who was rendered temporarily blind.

Redcastle was a mining town until the 1880s when the population started to decrease. Many abandoned gold mines can still be found in the area.
