= Muskerry, Victoria =

Muskerry Victoria
- Coordinates: 36°39′13″S 144°33′00″E
- Population: 59 (2021 census)
- Postcode(s): 3557
- LGA(s): Shire of Campaspe
- State electorate(s): Euroa
- Federal division(s): Nicholls

Muskerry is a locality in the Shire of Campaspe, Victoria, Australia. At the 2021 census, Muskerry had a population of 59.
