= Shire of Campaspe =

Coordinates: 36°21′40″S 144°44′02″E

- Local government area
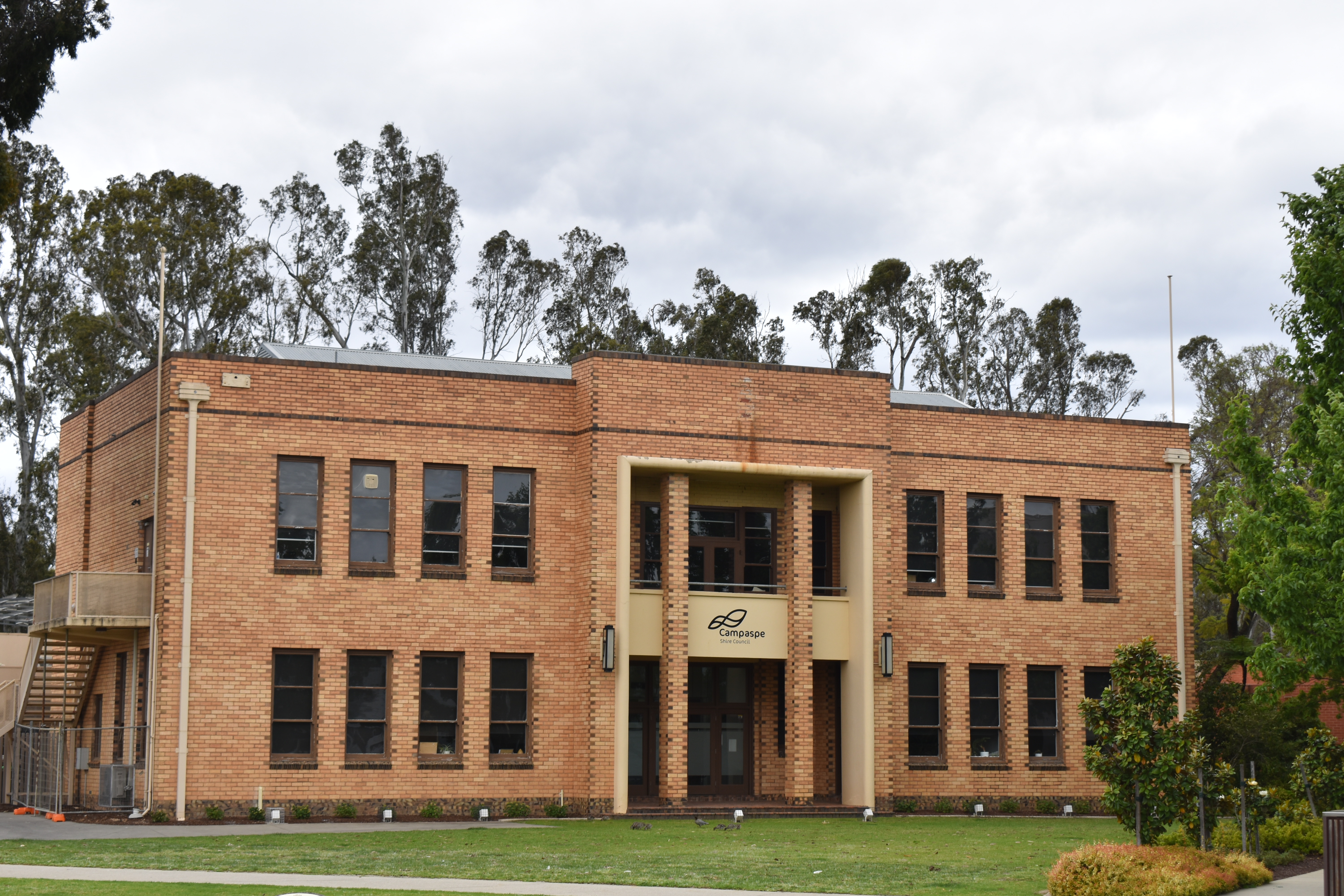
- Location in Victoria Council offices in Echuca

- Interactive map of Shire of Campaspe
- Country: Australia
- State: Victoria
- Region: Loddon Mallee
- Established: 18 November 1994
- Council seat: Echuca

Government
  - Mayor: Cr Daniel Mackrell
  - State electorates: Euroa; Murray Plains
  - Federal divisions: Bendigo; Nicholls

Area
  - Total: 4,519 km^{2} (1,745 sq mi)

Population
  - Total: 38,735 (2021)
  - Density: 8.5716/km^{2} (22.2003/sq mi)
- Gazetted: 20 January 1995
- Website: Shire of Campaspe
LGAs around Shire of Campaspe
| Gannawarra | Murray River (NSW) | Moira |
| Loddon | Shire of Campaspe | City of Greater Shepparton |
| Greater Bendigo | Strathbogie | Strathbogie |

The Shire of Campaspe is a local government area in Victoria, Australia, located in the northern part of the state. It covers an area of 4,519 square kilometres (1,745 mi^{2}) and in August 2021 had a population of 38,735. It includes the towns of Girgarre, Echuca, Kyabram, Rochester, Tongala and Rushworth.

The Shire is governed and administered by the Campaspe Shire Council; its seat of local government and administrative centre is located at the council headquarters in Echuca, it also has service centres located in Kyabram, Rochester, Rushworth and Tongala. The Shire is named after the Campaspe River, a major geographical feature that meanders through the LGA.

== History ==
The Shire of Campaspe was formed in 1995 from the amalgamation of the City of Echuca, Shire of Deakin, Shire of Rochester, Shire of Waranga, and Town of Kyabram, along with parts of the Shire of Rodney and small sections of the Shires of Gordon and Cohuna around Kow Swamp.

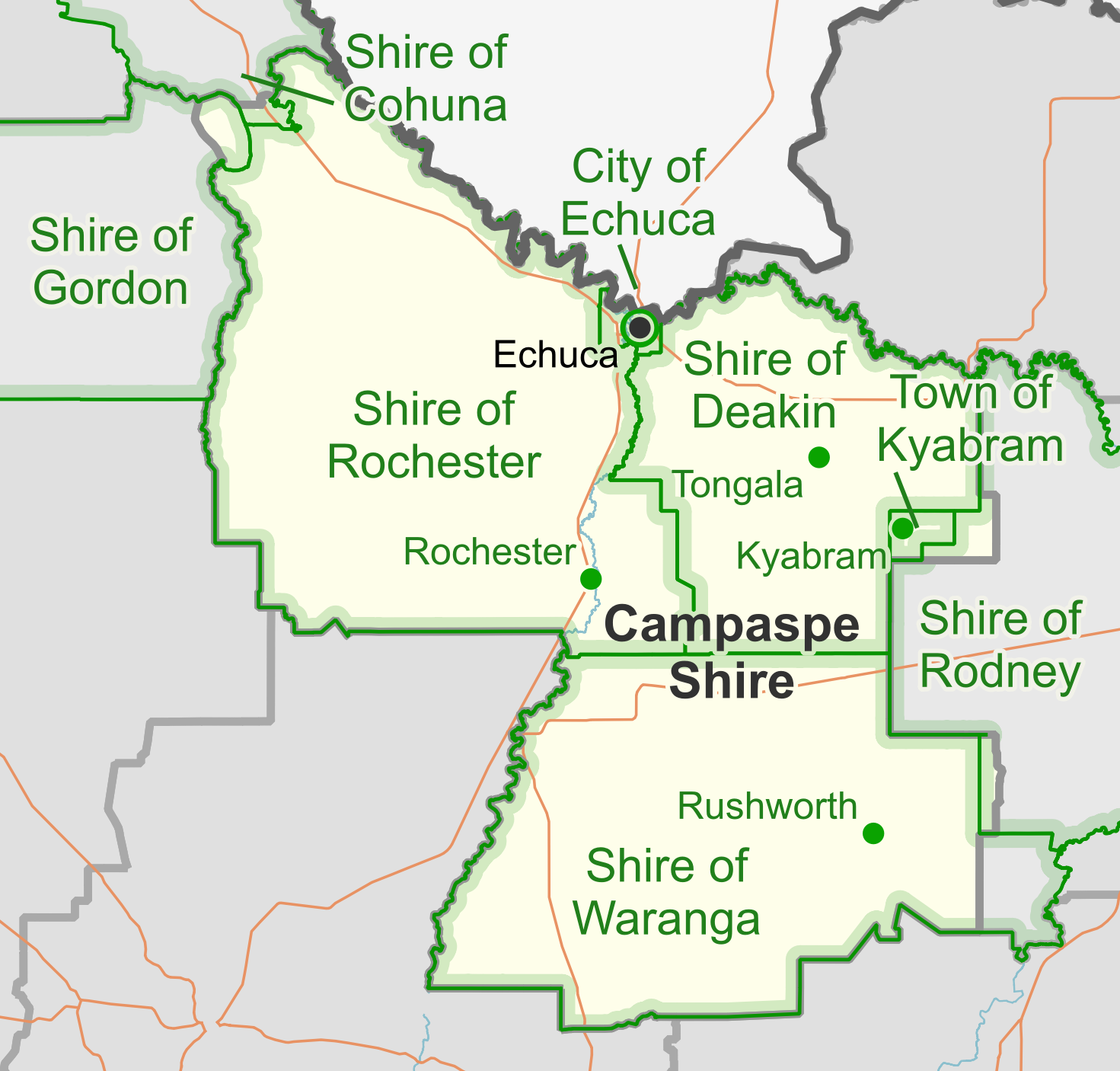
Campaspe Shire's predecessor LGAs (green) as they were in 1994. The administrative centres of the former LGAs are marked by green dots.

== Council ==
=== Current composition ===
The council is unsubdivided, with all nine councillors elected to represent the whole shire area.

| Ward | Councillor | Notes |
|---|---|---|
| Campaspe Shire | Robert Amos | |
| Campaspe Shire | Jessica Mitchell | |
| Campaspe Shire | Paul Jarman | |
| Campaspe Shire | John Zobec | |
| Campaspe Shire | Luke Sharrock | |
| Campaspe Shire | Tony Marwood | |
| Campaspe Shire | Adrian Weston | |
| Campaspe Shire | Daniel Mackrell | |
| Campaspe Shire | Zoe Cook | |

=== Administration and governance ===
The council meets in the council chambers at the council headquarters in the Echuca Municipal Offices, which is also the location of the council's administrative activities. It also provides customer services at both its administrative centre in Echuca, and its service centres in Kyabram, Rochester, Rushworth and Tongala.

== Election results ==
=== 2024 ===
2024 Victorian local elections: Campaspe
| Party | Candidate | Votes | % | ±% |
|---|---|---|---|---|
| Independent National | Rob Amos (elected 1) | 3,194 | 13.93 | −6.07 (Note: Compared to results in Echuca Ward at the 2020 election.) |
| Independent | Jessica Mitchell (elected 2) | 3,160 | 13.78 | +13.78 |
| Independent | Paul Jarman (elected 3) | 2,484 | 10.83 | −43.71 (Note: Compared to results in Rochester Ward at the 2020 election.) |
| Independent | John Zobec (elected 4) | 2,265 | 9.88 | −10.90 (Note: Compared to results in Kyabram–Deakin Ward at the 2020 election.) |
| Independent | Luke Sharrock (elected 5) | 2,046 | 8.92 | +8.92 |
| Independent | Adrian Weston (elected 7) | 1,761 | 7.68 | −92.32 (Note: Compared to results in Waranga Ward at the 2020 election.) |
| Independent | Tony Marwood (elected 6) | 1,714 | 7.48 | −14.51 |
| Independent | Daniel Mackrell (elected 8) | 1,517 | 6.62 | −23.61 |
| Greens | Zoe Cook (elected 9) | 1,501 | 6.55 | +6.55 |
| Independent National | Michael Farrant | 1,467 | 6.40 | +6.40 |
| Independent | Deb Chumbley | 1,329 | 5.80 | +5.80 |
| Independent | Brett Ould | 490 | 2.14 | +2.14 |
| Total formal votes | | 22,928 | 94.66 | −2.37 |
| Informal votes | | 1,293 | 5.34 | +2.37 |
| Turnout | | 24,221 | 81.46 | −0.44 |

== Sister cities ==
- Shiroi, Chiba, Japan
- (Timor-Leste) Lequidoe, Aileu Municipality, East Timor
- Shangri-La County, Yunnan Province, China

== Townships and localities ==
In the 2021 census, the shire had a population of 38,735, up from 37,061 in the 2016 census.

Population
| Locality | 2016 | 2021 |
|---|---|---|
| Ballendella | 124 | 120 |
| Bamawm | 504 | 491 |
| Bamawm Extension | 238 | 282 |
| Bonn | 33 | 48 |
| Burnewang | 36 | 37 |
| Burramboot | 32 | 36 |
| Carag Carag | 71 | 61 |
| Colbinabbin | 304 | 285 |
| Cornella | 43 | 43 |
| Corop | 129 | 161 |
| Creek View | * | 39 |
| Diggora | 94 | 78 |
| Echuca | 14,043 | 15,056 |
| Echuca Village | 540 | 577 |
| Echuca West | 425 | 442 |
| Fairy Dell | 80 | 93 |
| Girgarre | 561 | 563 |
| Gobarup | 32 | 45 |
| Gunbower | 551 | 578 |
| Kanyapella | 56 | 51 |
| Kotta | 109 | 134 |
| Koyuga | 315 | 355 |
| Kyabram^ | 7,331 | 7,416 |
| Kyvalley | 329 | 363 |
| Lancaster^ | 393 | 398 |
| Lockington | 808 | 850 |
| Milloo^ | 35 | 37 |
| Mitiamo^ | 117 | 116 |
| Moora | 17 | 32 |
| Muskerry | 50 | 59 |
| Myola | 39 | 7 |
| Nanneella | 388 | 425 |
| Patho | 108 | 138 |
| Pine Grove | 35 | 40 |
| Redcastle^ | 68 | 67 |
| Rochester | 3,113 | 3,154 |
| Roslynmead | 48 | 49 |
| Runnymede | 56 | 64 |
| Rushworth | 1,335 | 1,411 |
| Stanhope | 828 | 826 |
| Strathallan | 144 | 180 |
| Tennyson | 48 | 60 |
| Terrick Terrick East | 6 | 8 |
| Timmering | 96 | 90 |
| Tongala | 1,926 | 1,973 |
| Toolleen^ | 182 | 221 |
| Torrumbarry | 279 | 257 |
| Wanalta | * | # |
| Waranga Shores | 315 | 314 |
| Wharparilla | 488 | 483 |
| Whroo^ | 42 | 45 |
| Wyuna^ | 262 | 278 |
| Wyuna East | 103 | 106 |
| Yambuna | 110 | 109 |

^ - Territory divided with another LGA
* - Not noted in 2016 Census
# - Not noted in 2021 Census
