= Cornella, Victoria =

Cornella Victoria
- Coordinates: 36°42′22″S 144°45′25″E
- Population: 43 (2021 census)
- Postcode(s): 3551
- LGA(s): Shire of Campaspe
- State electorate(s): Euroa
- Federal division(s): Nicholls

Cornella is a locality in the Shire of Campaspe, Victoria, Australia. At the 2021 census, Cornella had a population of 43.
