= Wyuna, Victoria =

Wyuna
- Town
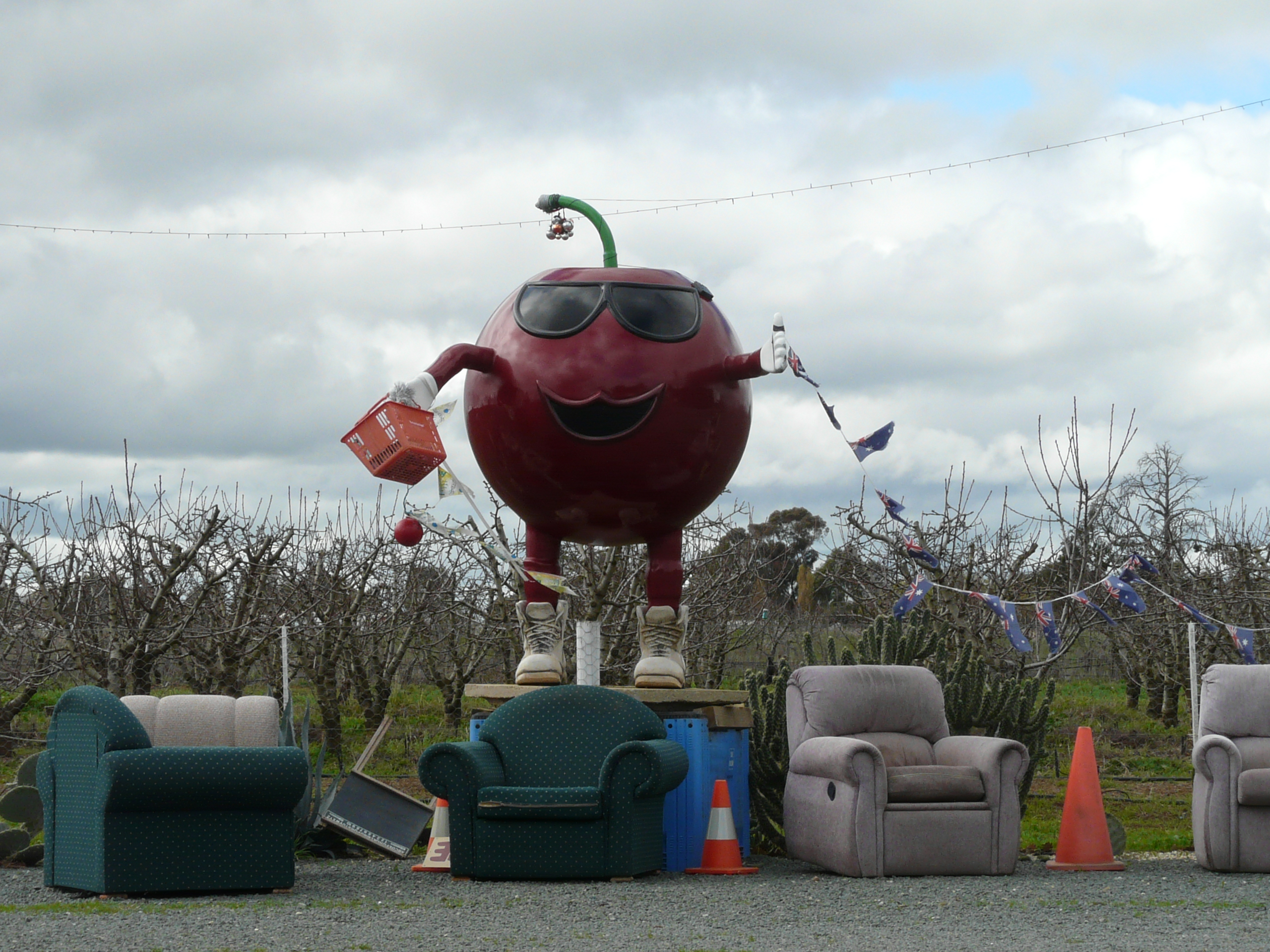
- The "Big Cherry" at Wyuna

- Coordinates: 36°11′51″S 145°3′39″E
- Country: Australia
- State: Victoria
- Region: Hume
- LGAs: Shire of Campaspe; City of Greater Shepparton
- Location: 215 km (134 mi) N of Melbourne; 40 km (25 mi) NW of Shepparton; 12 km (7.5 mi) N of Kyabram

Government
  - State electorate: Murray Plains
  - Federal division: Nicholls

Population
  - Total: 262 (2016 census)
- Postcode: 3561

Wyuna is a locality in the Goulburn Valley region of Victoria, Australia. The locality is in the Shire of Campaspe, 215 kilometres (134 mi) north of the state capital, Melbourne.

At the 2016 census, Wyuna and the surrounding area had a population of 262.

== Sport and recreation ==
The Wyuna Recreation Reserve is situated just off the Murray Valley Highway and is a crown land reserve, managed by a committee of management and open to the public, with an oval, now set up for equestrian events.

The Wyuna Football Association was formed in 1907 by the following clubs - Kyabram Imperials, Tongala and Wyuna.

Wyuna Football Club played in the Kyabram District Junior Football Association between 1910 and 1928, playing off in eight grand finals and won premierships in - 1921, 1922 and 1926.

Wyuna Football Club played in the Kyabram District Football Association from 1932 to 1936 and from 1946 to 1952. Wyuna folded just prior to the 1953 Kyabram District Football Association season.
