= Rochester, Victoria =

Australian town

Rochester
- Town
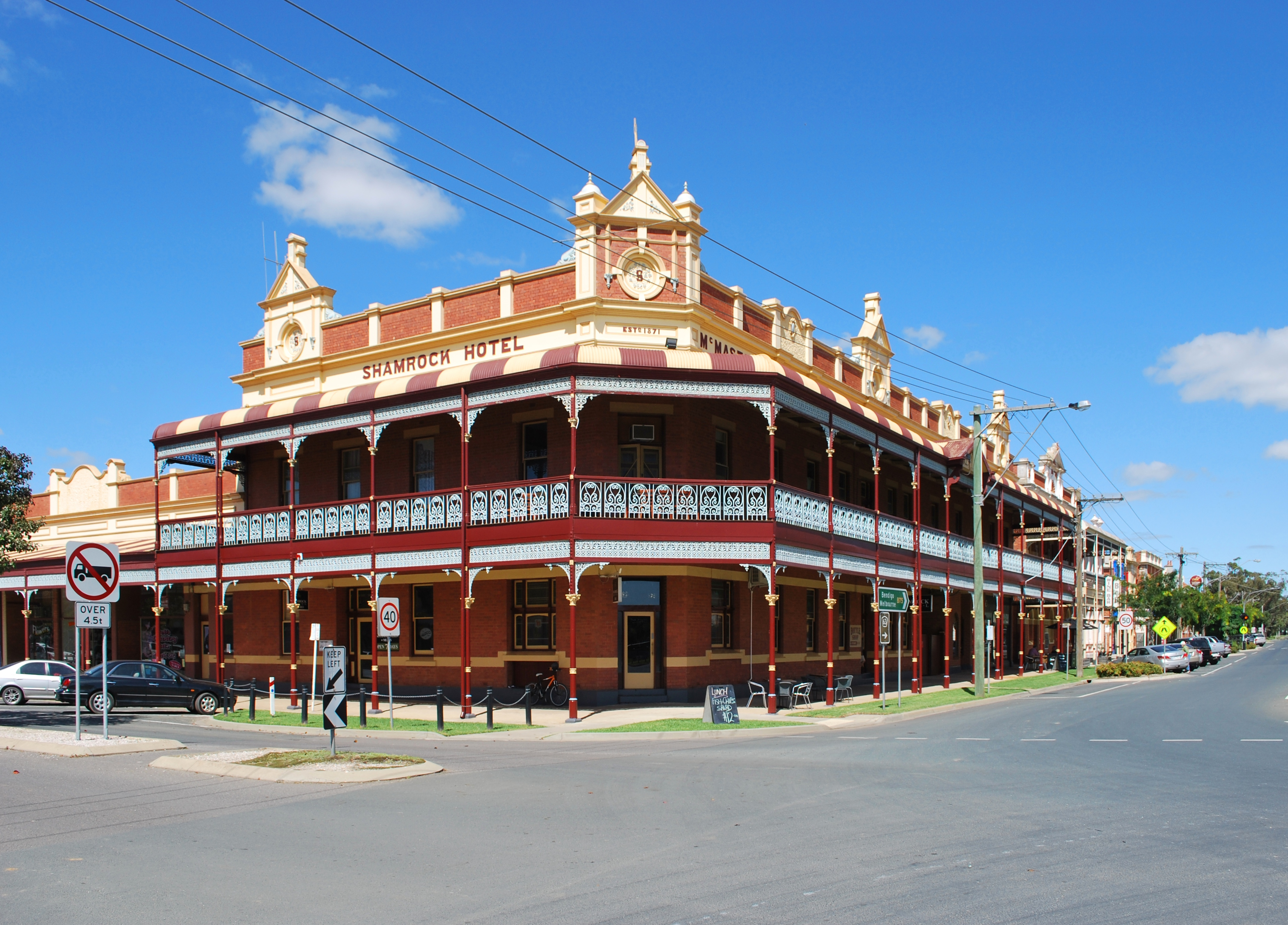
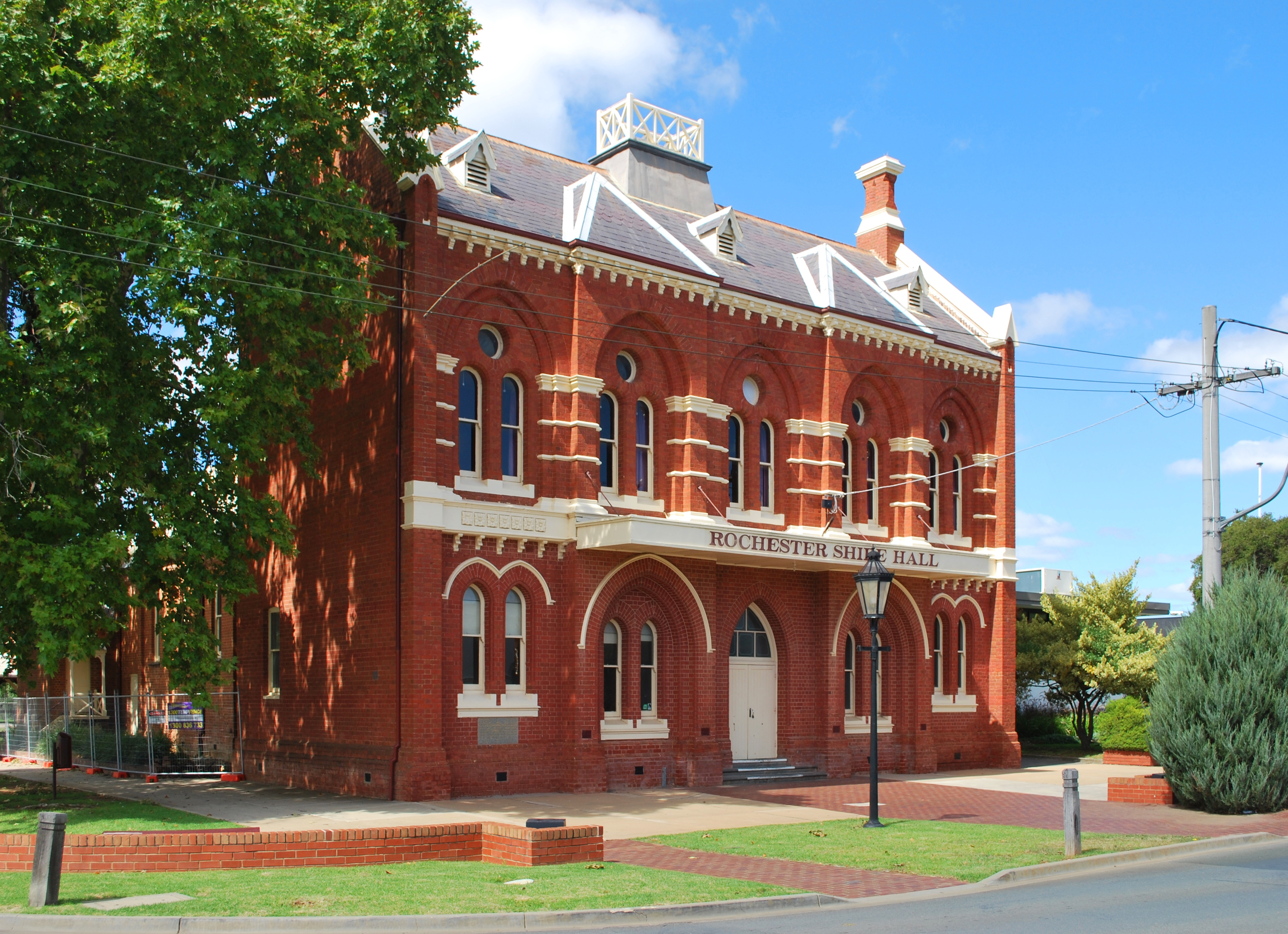
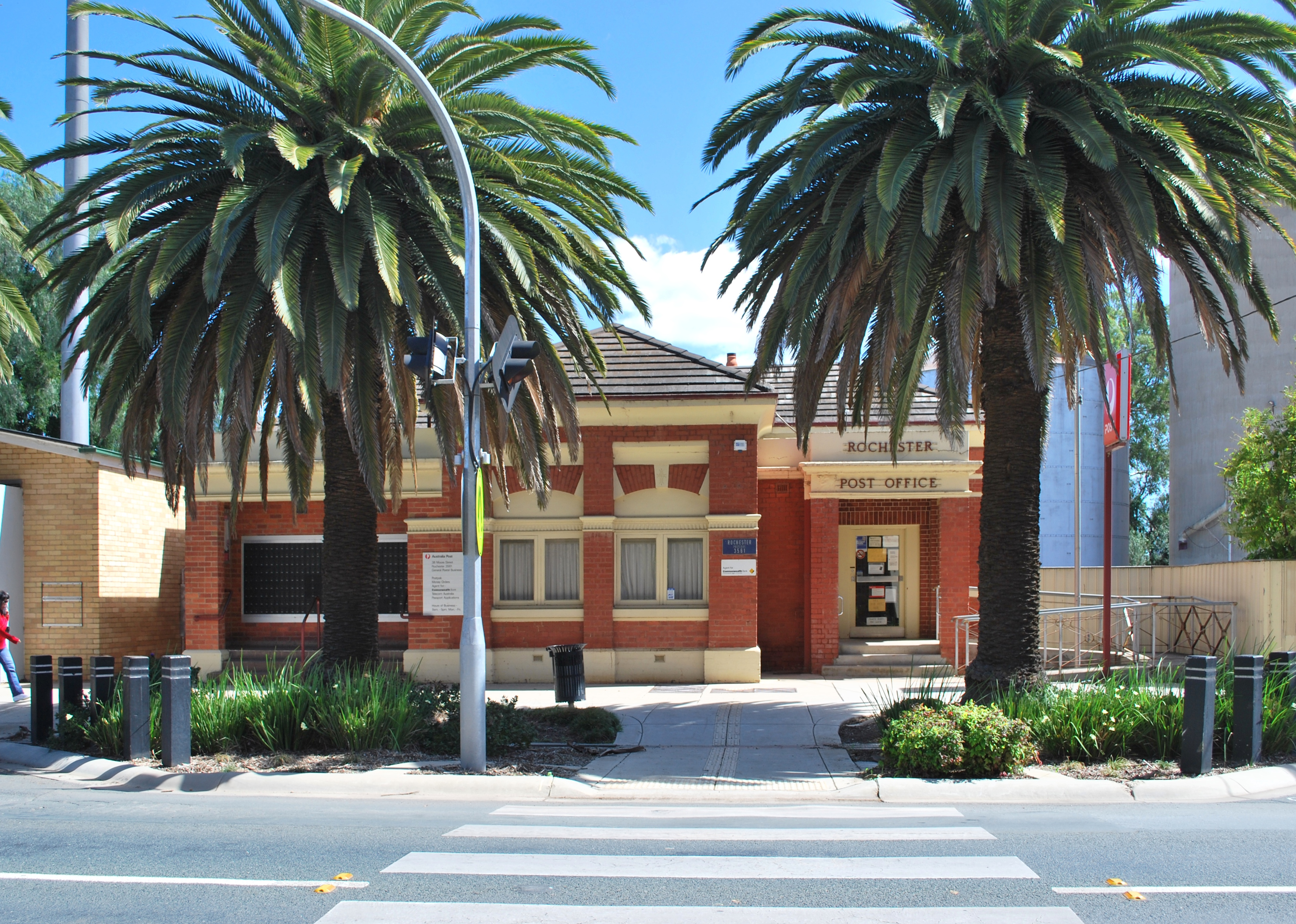
- Shamrock Hotel; Rochester Shire Hall; Rochester Post Office

- Interactive map of Rochester
- Coordinates: 36°22′0″S 144°42′0″E
- Country: Australia
- State: Victoria
- LGA: Shire of Campaspe
- Location: 179 km (111 mi) N of Melbourne; 63 km (39 mi) NE of Bendigo; 66 km (41 mi) W of Shepparton; 29 km (18 mi) S of Echuca

Government
  - State electorate: Murray Plains
  - Federal division: Bendigo
- Elevation: 105 m (344 ft)

Population
  - Total: 3,154 (2021 census)
- Postcode: 3561
- Mean max temp: 21.3 °C (70.3 °F)
- Mean min temp: 9.0 °C (48.2 °F)
- Annual rainfall: 437.6 mm (17.23 in)
Localities around Rochester
	Ballandella	Fairy Dell
Diggora	Rochester	Nanneella
Elmore		Bonn

Rochester is a town in the Shire of Campaspe, Victoria, Australia. It is located 180 km (110 mi) north of Melbourne with a mixture of rural and semi-rural communities on the northern Campaspe River, between Bendigo and the Murray River port of Echuca. At the 2021 census, Rochester had a population of 3,154.

== History ==
The area around the Campaspe River was known as Yalooka, which for thousands of years was home to the Pinpandoor, the local tribe of Aboriginal Australians.

Rochester (via Rowechester) was named after Dr John Pearson Rowe, who had a hotel here before the township was gazetted in 1855. The Post Office opened on 11 May 1863 and the town was reached by the railway line from Bendigo (connecting it to Melbourne) in 1864.

The Rochester Magistrates' Court closed on 1 January 1990.

The town was the birthplace in 1904 of Australian racing and endurance cyclist, Sir Hubert Opperman, affectionately known as Oppy. There is a museum dedicated to Oppy in Moore street, and a statue of him winning the 24-hour Bol D'Or race in Paris in 1928. On his 90th birthday, Oppy donated one of his Malvern Star bicycles to the museum.

== The town today ==
Agriculture plays an important part in the economy of Rochester. Primary agriculture includes dairy, tomatoes, cattle and sheep. There are also some grain and seed farms. The Murray Goulburn (dairy processing) factory was a large employer, but it closed in late 2017. There are also several other smaller industries.

It has a co-educational public Primary and Secondary College with 470 pupils in 2004.

Spare time in Rochester often revolves around sport, with tennis, cricket, basketball, Australian rules football, netball, lawn bowls, cycling and swimming all well supported. The town has an Australian Rules football team competing in the Goulburn Valley Football League known as the Tigers, who won the GVFL premiership in 2012.

Golfers play at the Campaspe Golf Club on the Northern Highway, or at the course of the Rochester Golf Club on Black Culvert Road.

The town has its own railway station.

== Notable residents ==
Rochester was the birthplace of Sir Hubert Opperman, an acclaimed endurance cyclist and politician.

Rochester is also the birthplace of Mick Harvey, influential musician of The Birthday Party and Nick Cave and the Bad Seeds.

The town has a few murals of Bluey, an Australian Cattle Dog who was said to be the world’s oldest dog.

== 2011 floods ==
High intensity rainfall in January 2011 caused major flooding across much of the western and central parts of the Australian state of Victoria. Rochester suffered the greatest flood in the town's history in January 2011. Around 80% of the town was inundated with water from the Campaspe River. The Campaspe reached a peak of 9.17 m (30.1 ft) (at the Rochester Syphon) during the late afternoon of 15 January 2011. Recordings at the Rochester Township station ceased on the morning of 15 January 2011 after it too was swallowed by the rising river. Many of the town's residents were evacuated to the town of Echuca, 30 km (19 mi) to the north, with the military called in to assist the evacuation of the Rochester hospital.

The floods were the result of a large amount of rain falling into the Campaspe catchment at Lake Eppalock throughout the course of the week prior to the flood. Large volumes of water coursed down Eppalock's spillways directly into the Campaspe, directly affecting towns downstream.

== Gallery ==
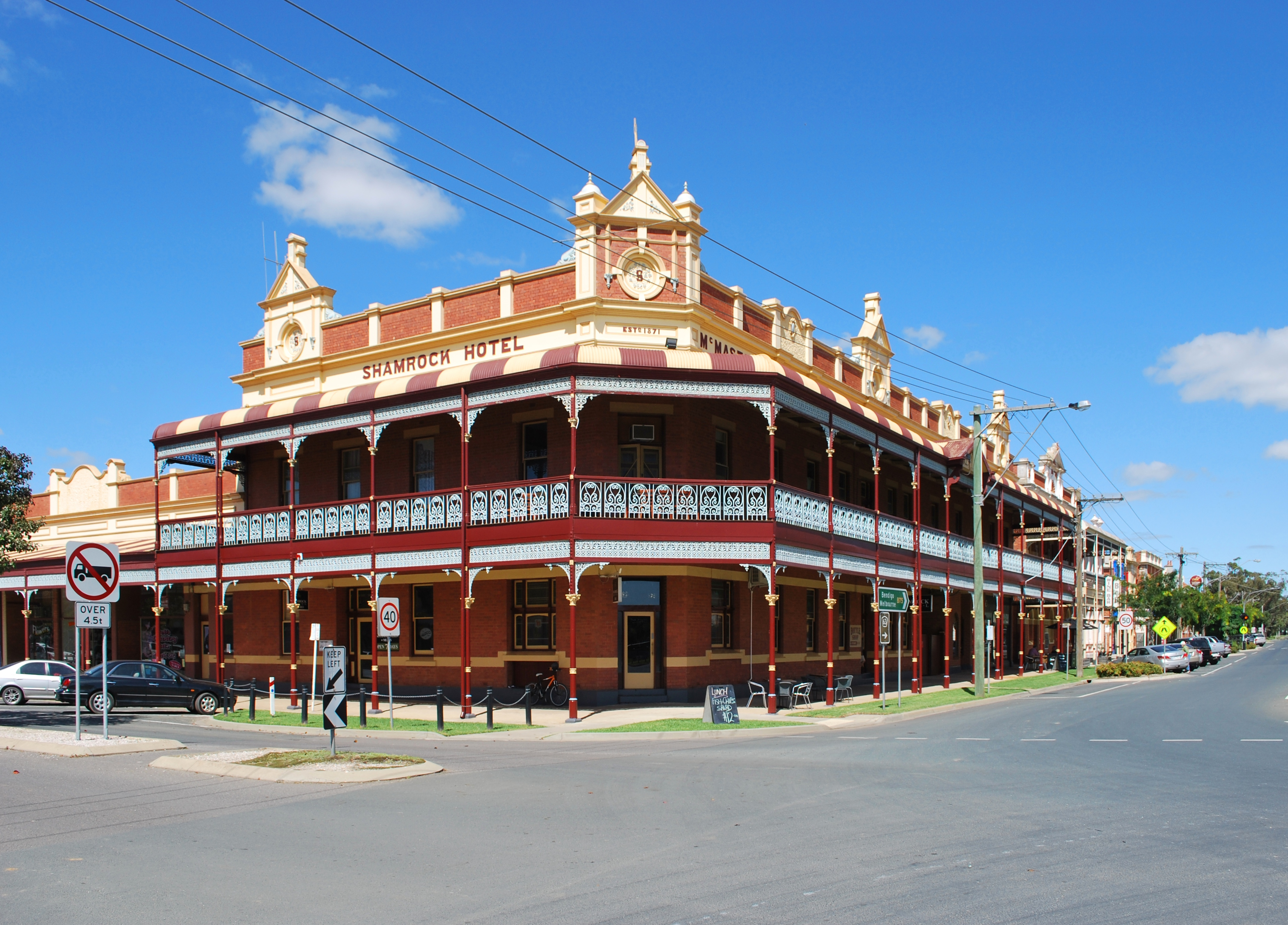
Shamrock Hotel (1871)

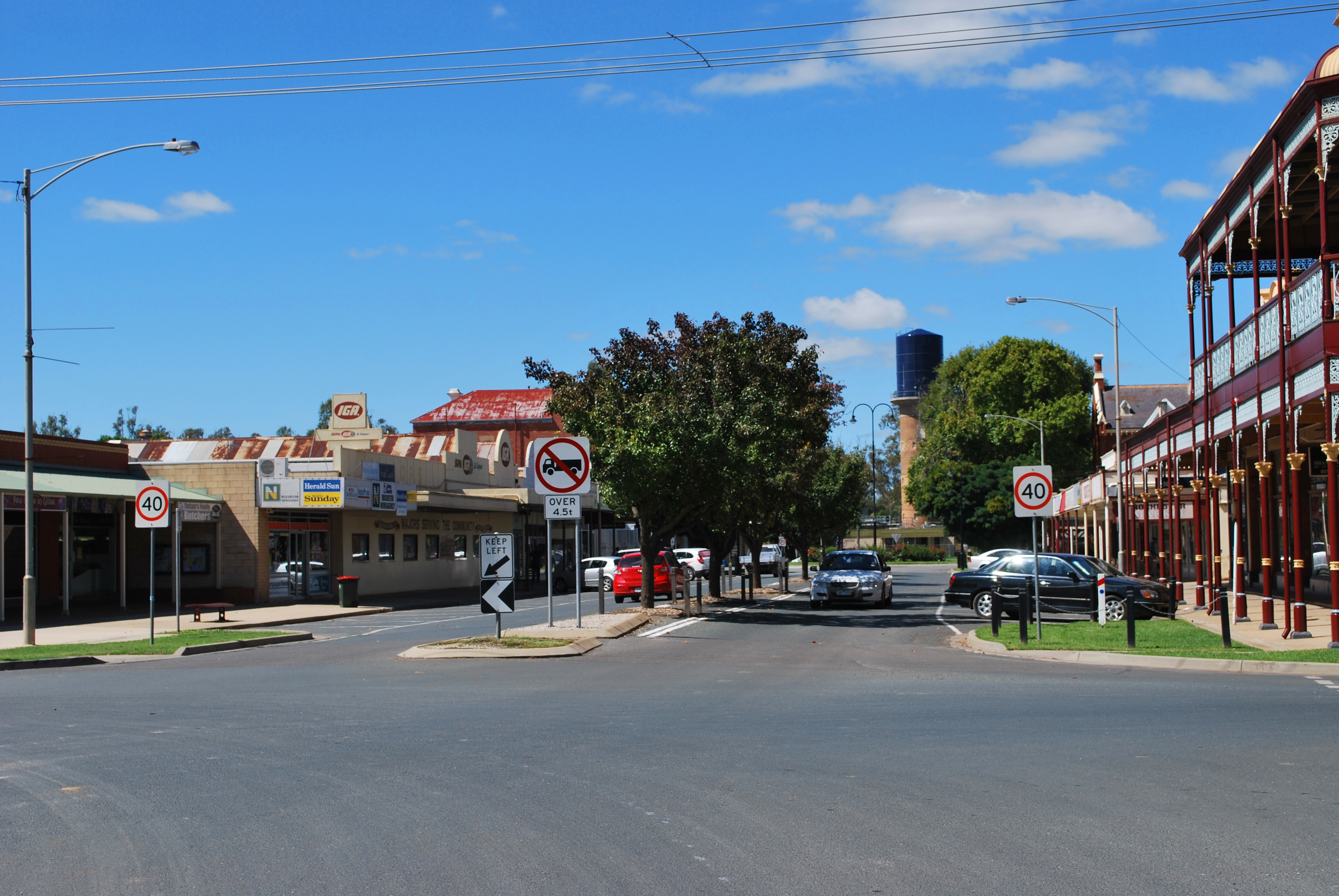
Gillies St

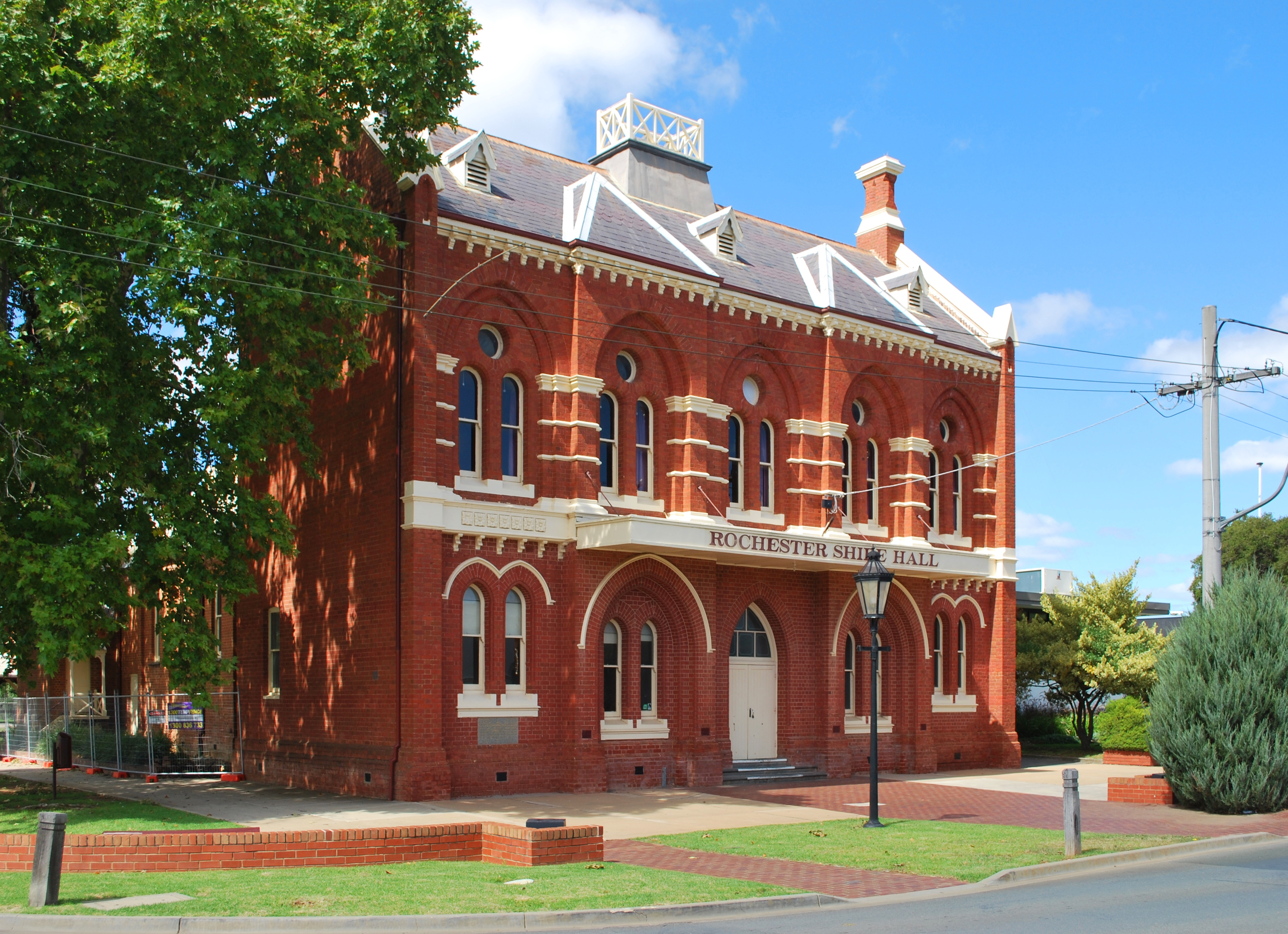
Former Shire Hall

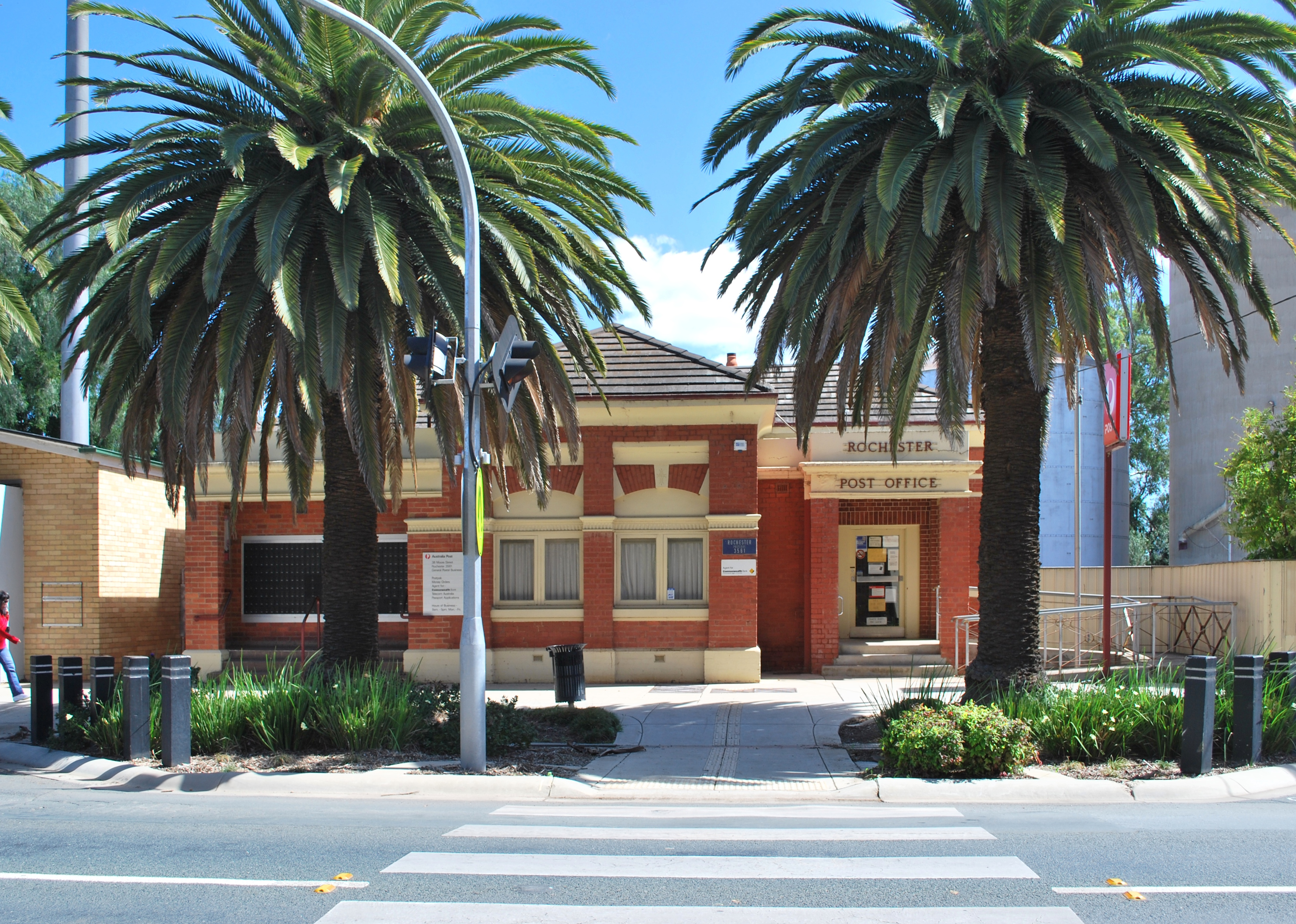
Post office

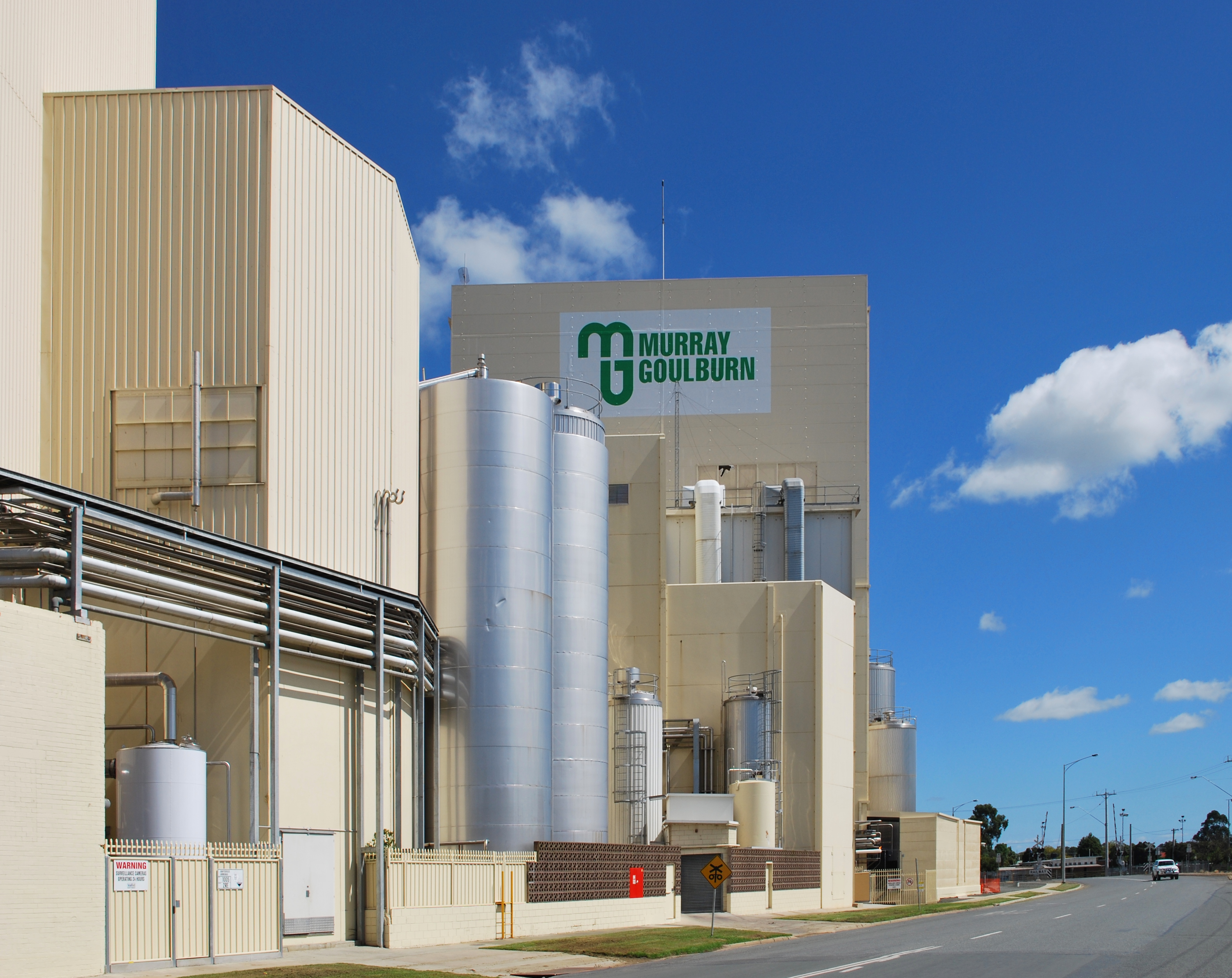
Murray Goulburn dairy

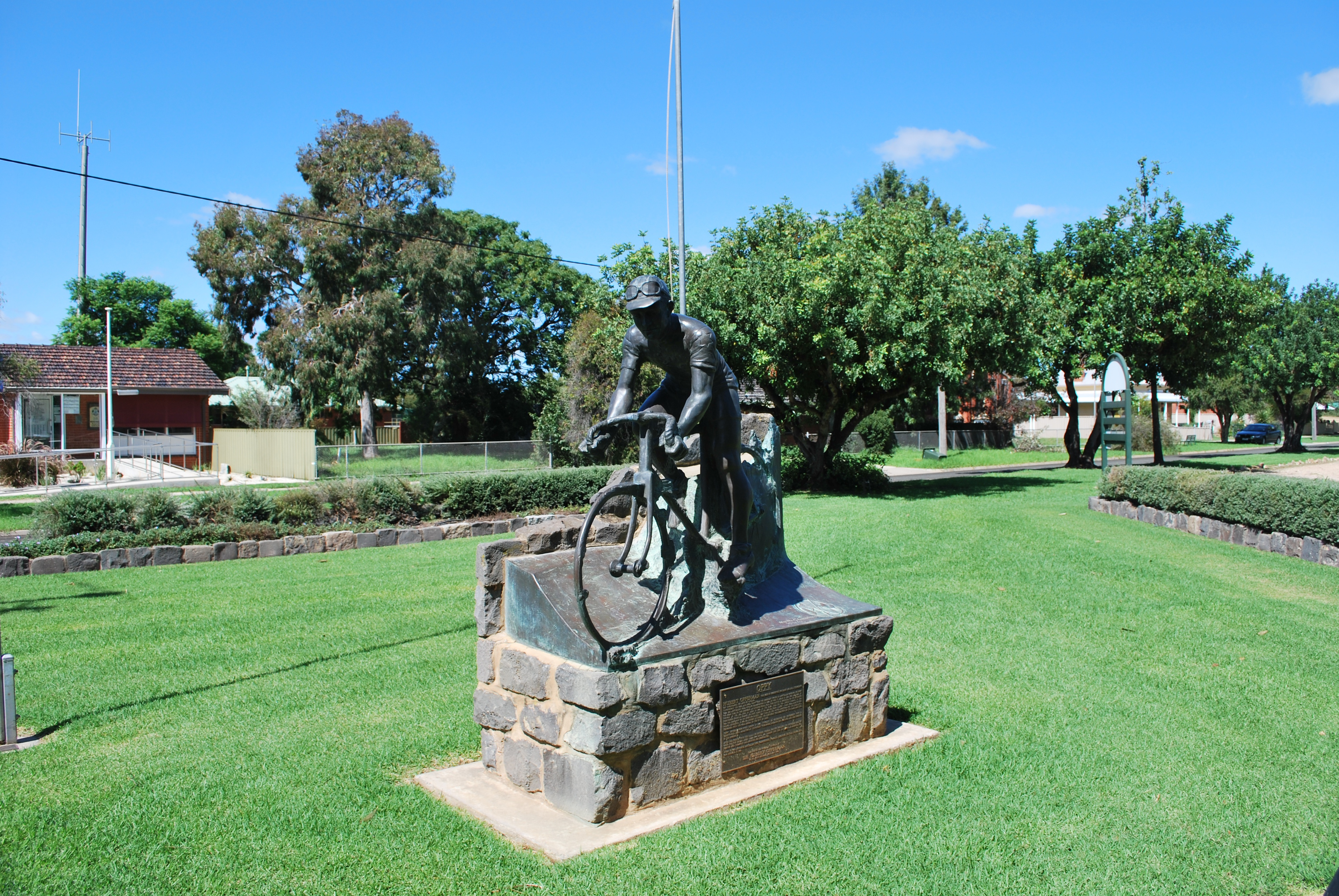
Hubert Opperman statue

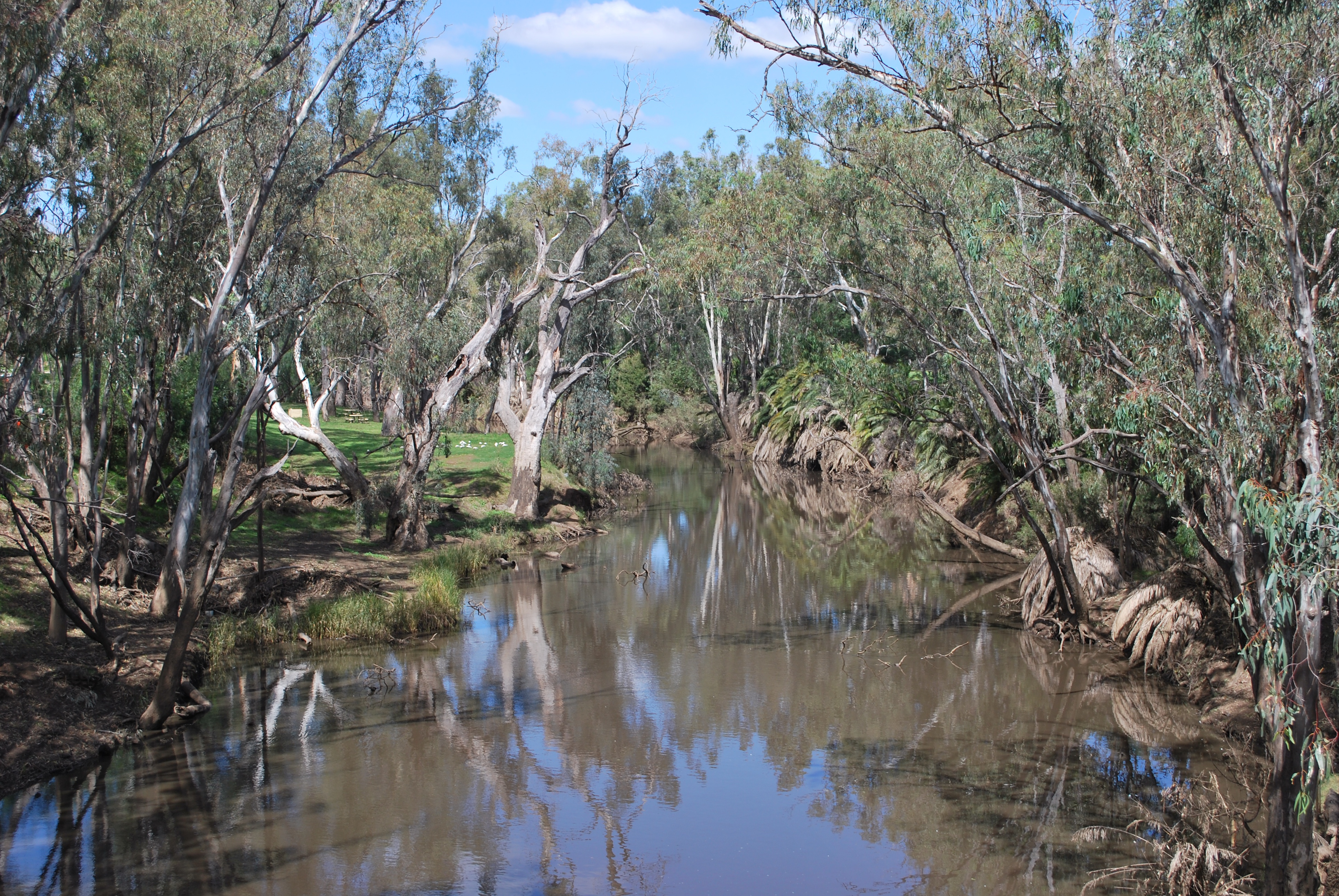
Campaspe River

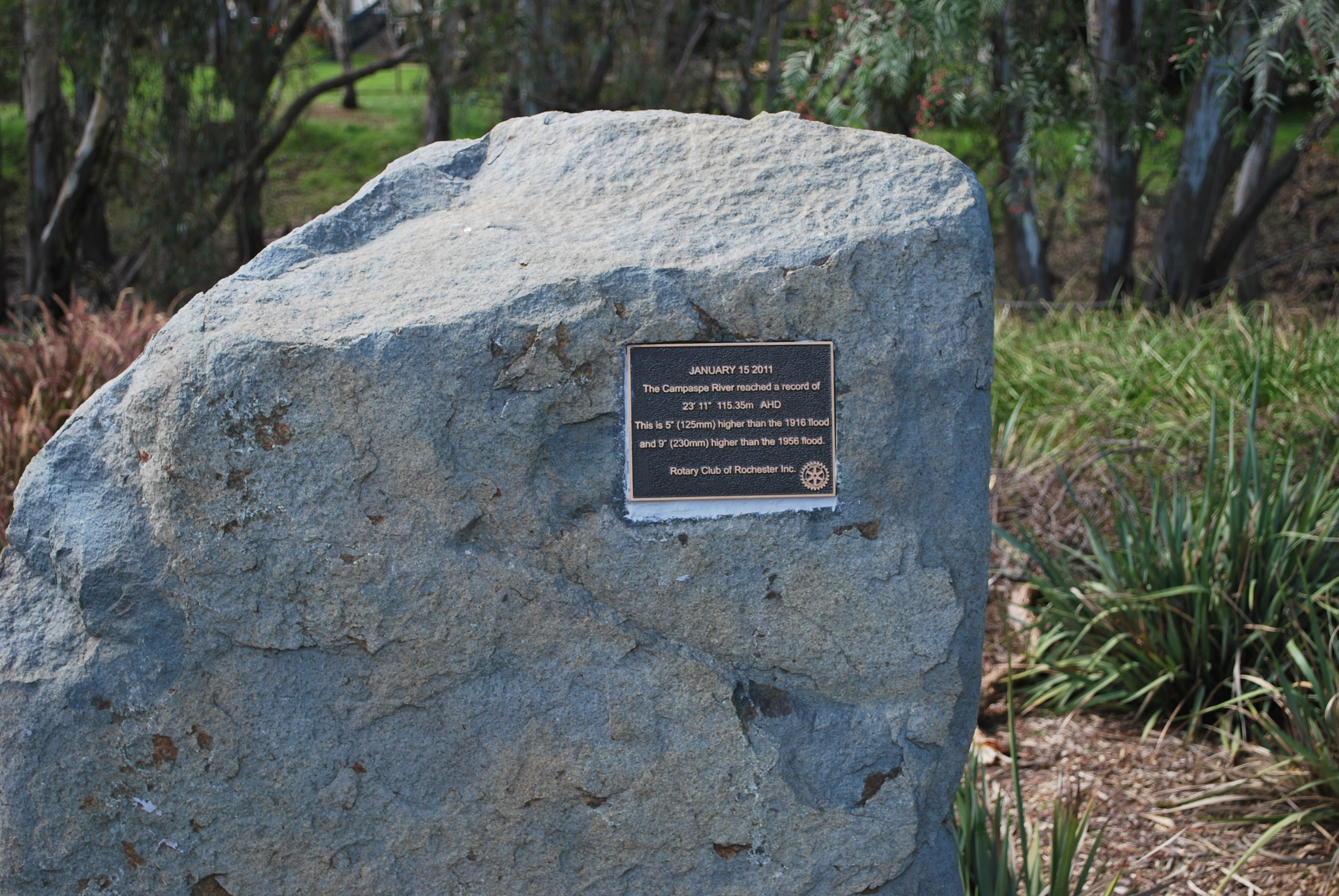
2011 flood monument

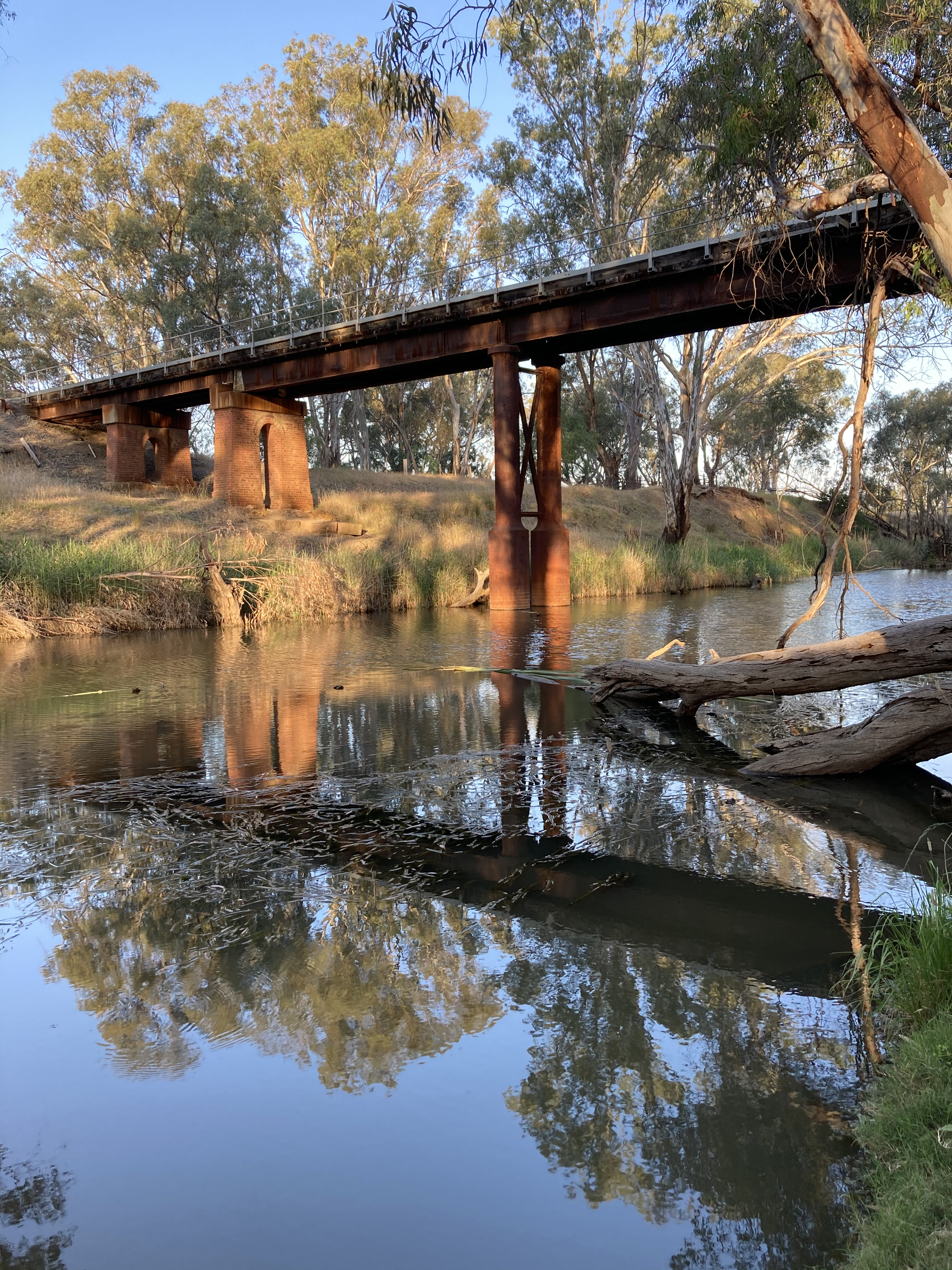
Bridge over the Campaspe
