= Stanhope, Victoria =

Stanhope
- Town
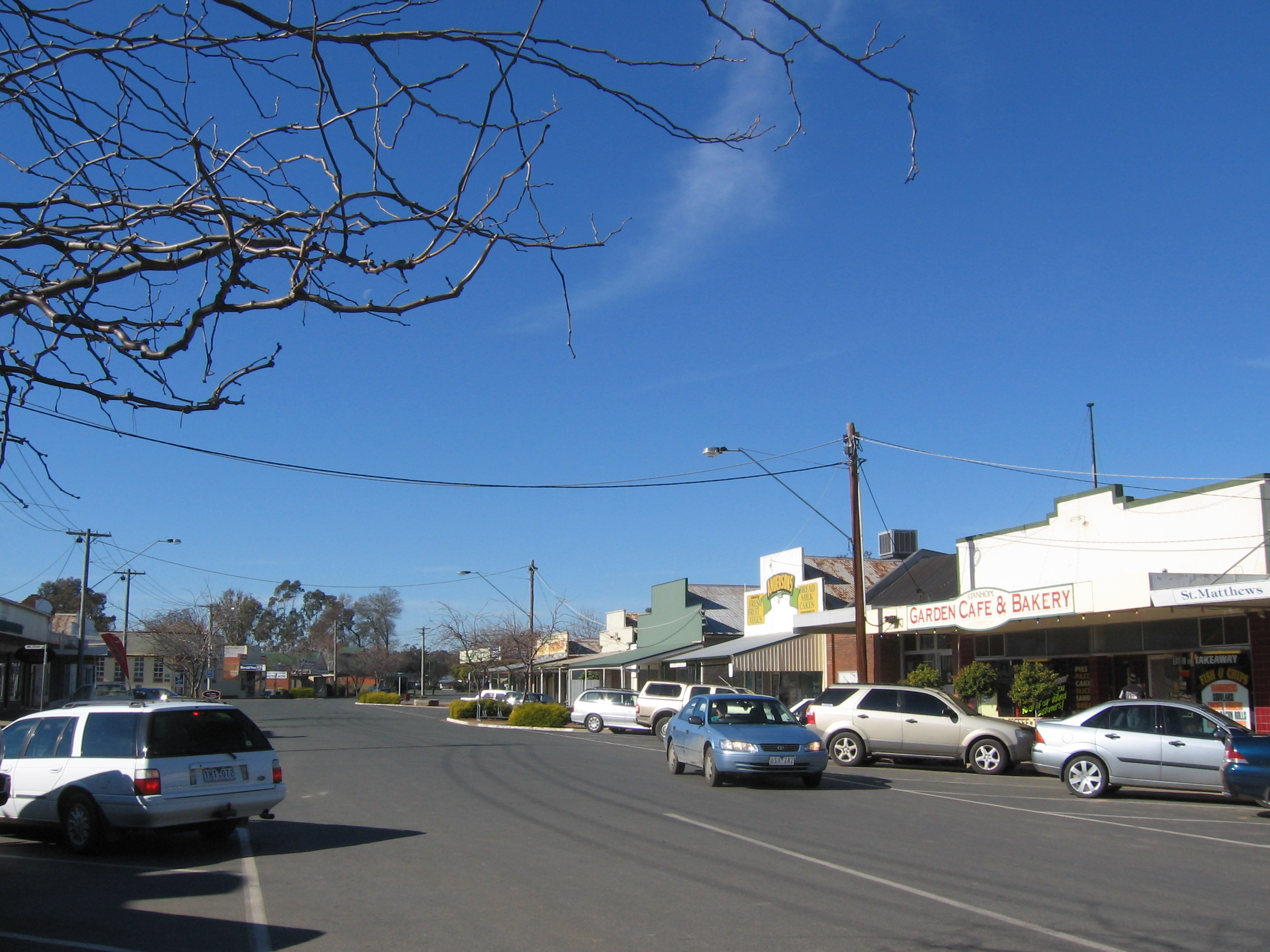
- Main street

- Interactive map of Stanhope
- Coordinates: 36°26′43″S 144°59′02″E
- Country: Australia
- State: Victoria
- LGA: Shire of Campaspe
- Location: 197 km (122 mi) N of Melbourne; 42 km (26 mi) W of Shepparton; 22 km (14 mi) S of Kyabram

Government
  - State electorate: Euroa
  - Federal division: Nicholls

Population
  - Total: 828 (2016 census)
- Postcode: 3623

Stanhope is a town in north central Victoria, Australia. Stanhope is 42 kilometres (26 mi) from Shepparton. It lies 197 kilometres (122 mi) north of the state capital Melbourne and 567 kilometres (352 mi) south west of Canberra the capital city of Australia. At the 2016 census, Stanhope had a population of 828.

== History ==
The Post Office opened on 21 May 1917 but was known as Lauderdale until 1920.

== Today ==
Like many towns in this area of Victoria, it relies heavily on its dairy production, and farming. A large dairy processing plant lies in the centre of the town.

Like much of Victoria, Netball and Australian rules football are extremely popular and Stanhope hosts a team which is part of the Kyabram & District Football League.

Services in the town include a general convenience store, a pub, lawn bowls and tennis clubs.

Local landmarks include Lake Cooper and Loch Garry and other towns nearby include Girgarre and Tatura and Kyabram.

== Notable people ==
John McEwen, 18th Prime Minister of Australia, was a dairy farmer in Stanhope before entering politics.

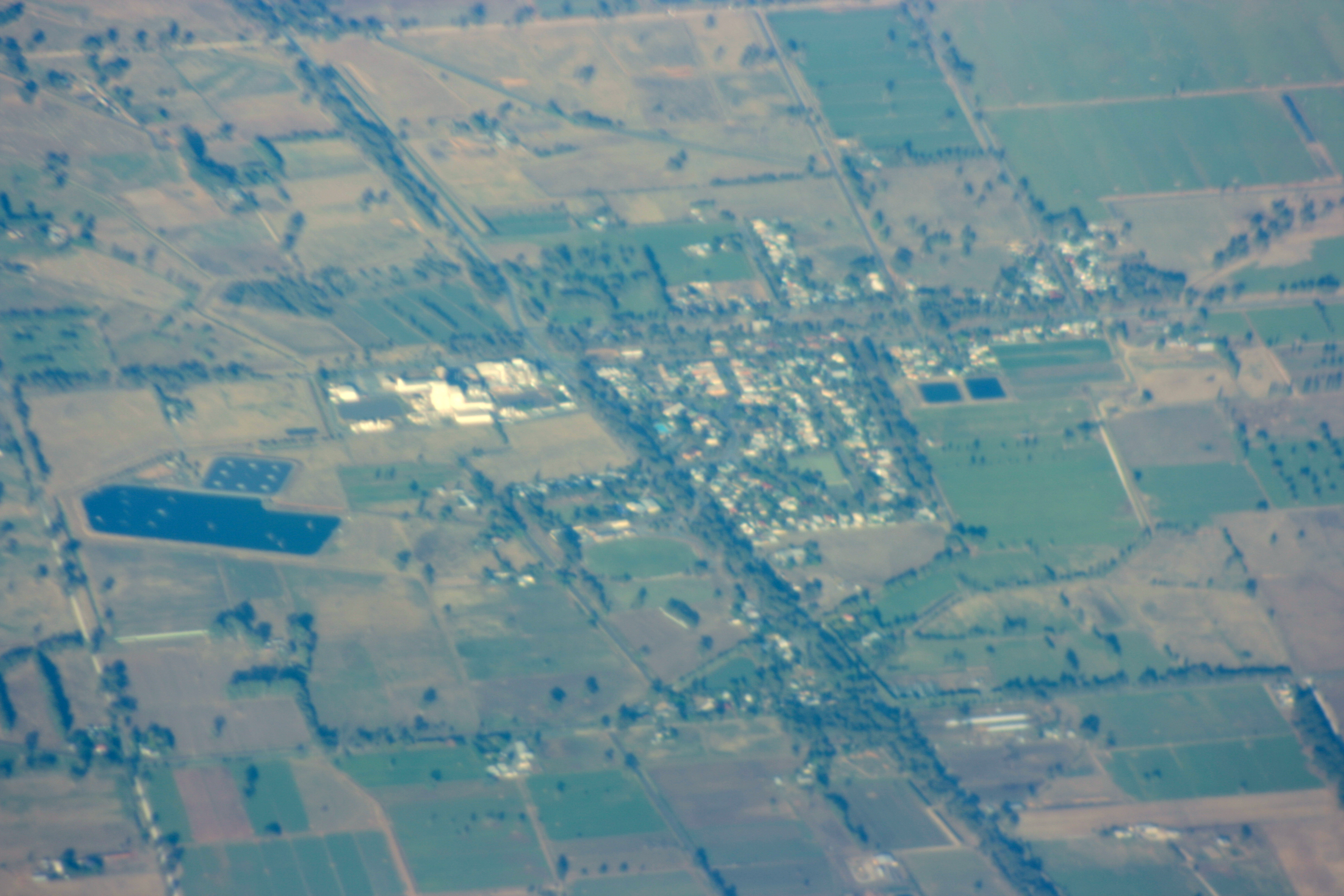
Aerial Picture
