= Carag Carag =

- Suburb
- Interactive map of Carag Carag
- Coordinates: 36°27′16.15339″S 144°53′19.04355″E
- Country: Australia
- State: Victoria
- City: Shire of Campaspe
- LGA: Shire of Campaspe
- Established: 1878

Government
  - State electorate: Euroa
  - Federal division: Nicholls

Population
  - Total: 61 (2021 census)
- Postcode: 3523

Carag Carag is a locality in the Shire of Campaspe, Victoria, Australia. At the 2021 census, Carag Carag had a population of 61.

== History ==
The name is derived from the Ngurai-illamwurrung word "Coragorag" meaning "magpie". Carag Carag was founded in 1878.
