= Tongala =

- Town
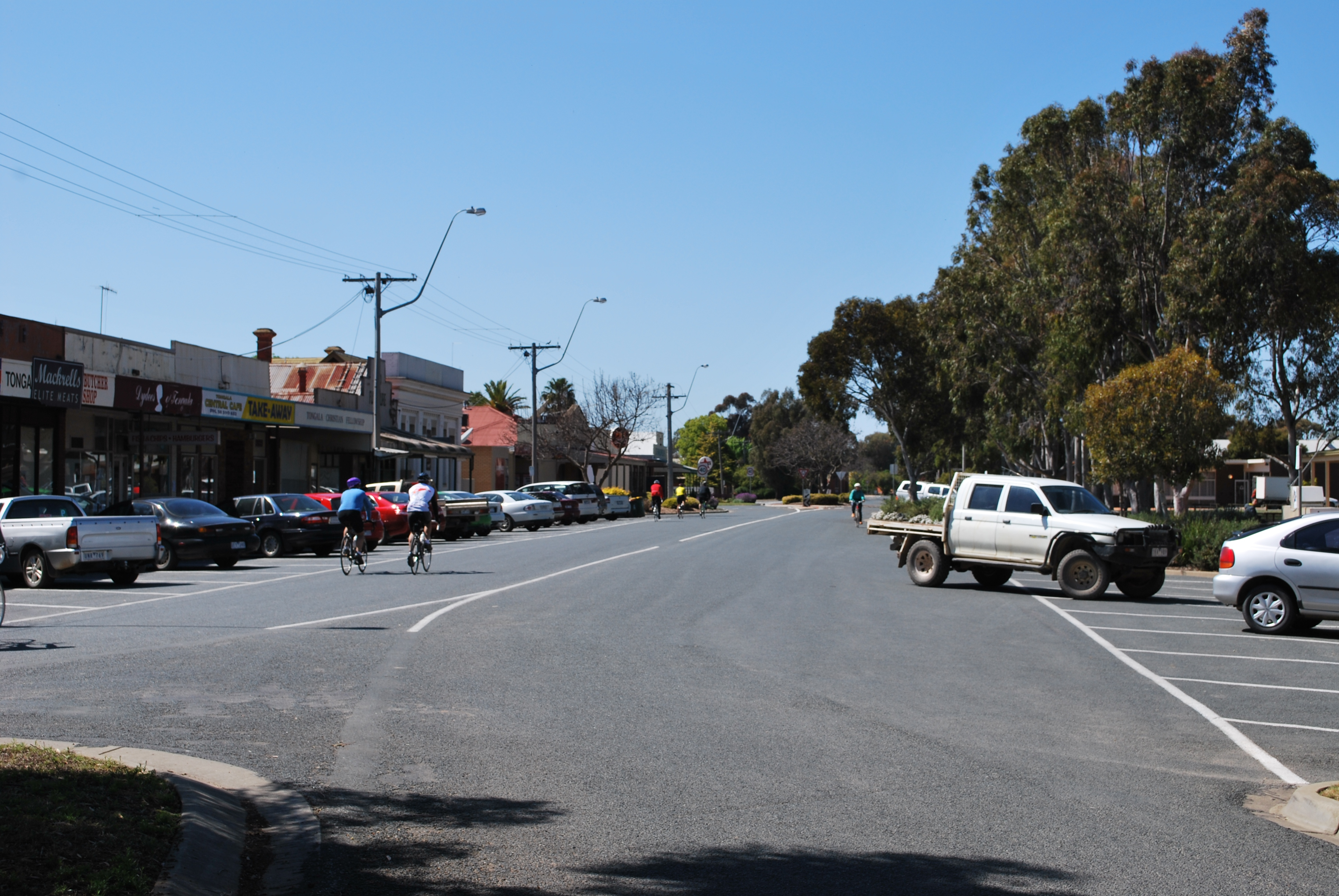
- Mangan St, the main street of Tongala

- Interactive map of Tongala
- Coordinates: 36°15′0″S 144°57′0″E
- Country: Australia
- State: Victoria
- LGA: Shire of Campaspe
- Location: 198 km (123 mi) N of Melbourne; 55 km (34 mi) NW of Shepparton; 26 km (16 mi) S of Echuca

Government
  - State electorate: Murray Plains
  - Federal division: Nicholls

Population
  - Total: 1,926 (2016 census)
- Postcode: 3621

Tongala /təŋˈɡɑːlə/ is a town in the Goulburn Valley region of northern Victoria, Australia. The town is in the Shire of Campaspe local government area, between Kyabram and Echuca, 225 kilometres (140 mi) north of the state capital, Melbourne. At the 2016 census, Tongala had a population of 1,926.

== History ==
The first Post Office in the area opened on 27 April 1878. In 1882 it was renamed Kanyapella and a new Tongala office opened to the south; this was renamed Tongala East in 1908 when a new Tongala office replaced the Tongala railway station office in the township.

St Patrick's Catholic church was constructed in 1909, opening on Sunday 28 November 1909. St Patrick's Catholic primary school was opened in 1959.

The Tongala water tower, designed by John Monash, was constructed in 1914 with an initial capacity of 10,000 imperial gallons (45,000 L) and extended to 20,000 imperial gallons (91,000 L) in 1923.

After World War I many blocks were opened up under the 'soldier-settler' scheme. One such soldier settler was John McEwen— later Prime Minister of Australia—who bought a block at Tongala and married a local, Anne McLeod, in the town in 1921.

In November 2003 a monument to the 24 Australian Light Horse regiments and their horses was unveiled by Maurice Watson, the last Light Horseman who enlisted from Tongala. The statue, standing two metres tall, is of a horseman carrying an empty saddle, bridle and saddle cloth, walking away, with his head lowered.

In 2012, photographer Shaun C Mackrell undertook a year-long project to document and record the people of Tongala and their stories. The project culminated in a touring exhibition which was shown in Tongala, Bendigo and Brunswick. Later the series was put on display in Melbourne's Federation Square for three months at the end of 2012. The project was made possible only by the support of the Federal Governments Regional Arts Fund as administered by Regional Arts Victoria.

== Economy ==
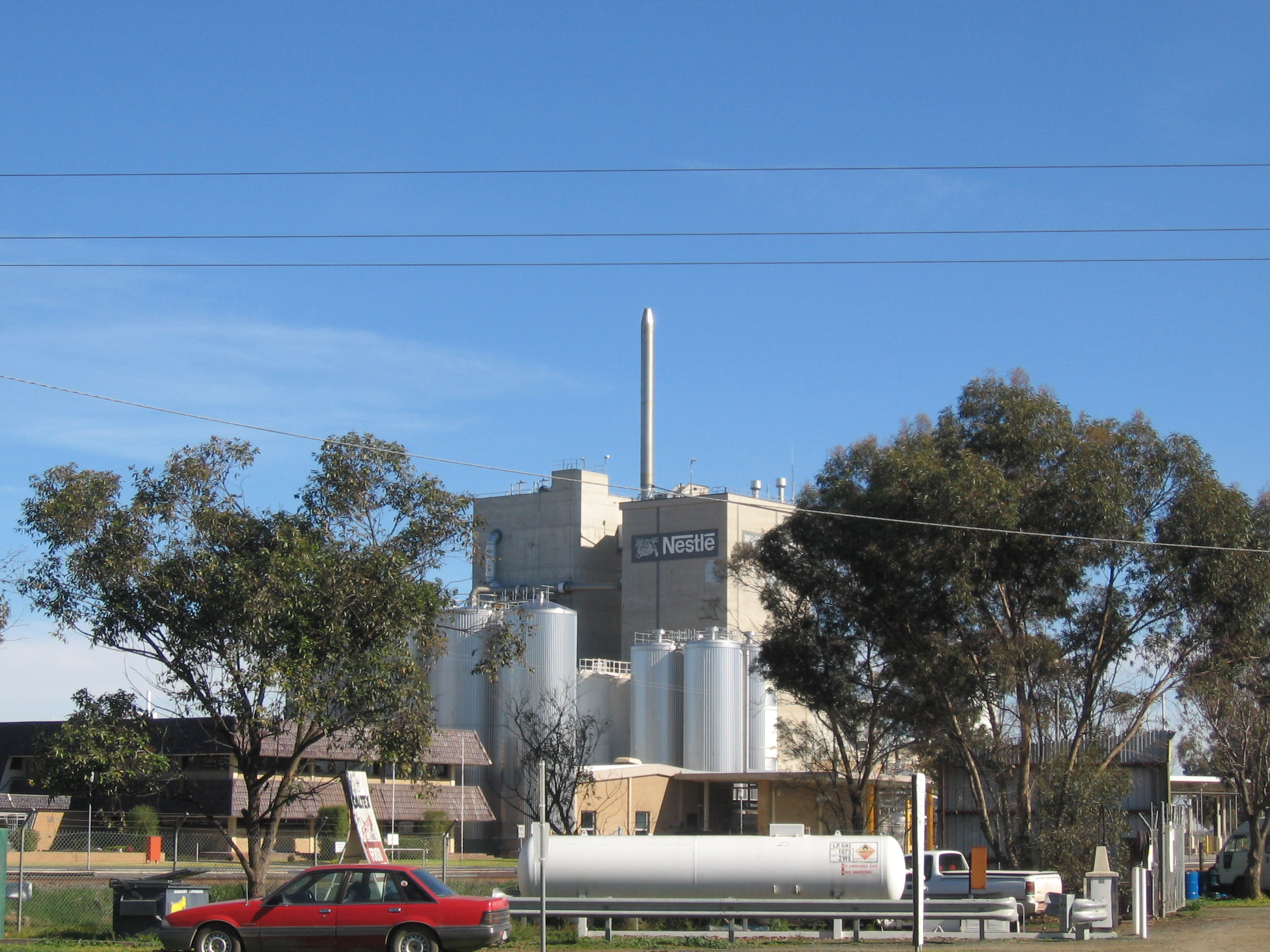
The Nestlé factory

Dairying is the most significant industry in the town's economic structure that also includes food processing at a Nestlé plant. In June 2005 Nestle announced that it would cease manufacturing powdered milk in Australia and that its Tongala factory would be restructured to become a liquid milk only site with 147 jobs to be lost.

Nestlé proceeded to invest $17 million back in to the factory in late 2011, constructing a new liquid manufacturing facility that would go on to produce part of their Health Science range consisting of ready-to-drink medical supplements. It opened in October 2012.

In August 2019 Nestle announced the shutdown of the Tongala factory with all 106 remaining jobs to be made redundant. A spokesperson for Nestlé cited a change in consumer purchasing behavior towards tinned milk and increasing competition from cheap imports

SunRice operates a CopRice plant that employs thirty staff in a state of the art stockfeed mill, established in 1989, with a capacity to produce up to 100,000 tonnes of stockfeed.

== Attractions ==
On walls around town can be seen the Tongala Murals, many painted by local artist Murray Ross, which show the history of the dairy industry and Tongala.
