= Yarroweyah railway station =

Former railway station in Victoria, Australia

Coordinates: 35°55′34″S 145°33′45″E

Yarroweyah

General information
- Line: Cobram

Other information
- Status: Closed

History
- Opened: 1 October 1888

Services
| Preceding station | Disused railways | Following station |
|---|---|---|
| Strathmerton | Cobram line | Cobram |
| | List of closed railway stations in Victoria | |
Location

Yarroweyah is a former railway station in Yarroweyah, Victoria, Australia.

Yarroweyah became a no-on-in-charge station in March 1976.
