= Tocumwal Guardian and Riverina Stock Journal =

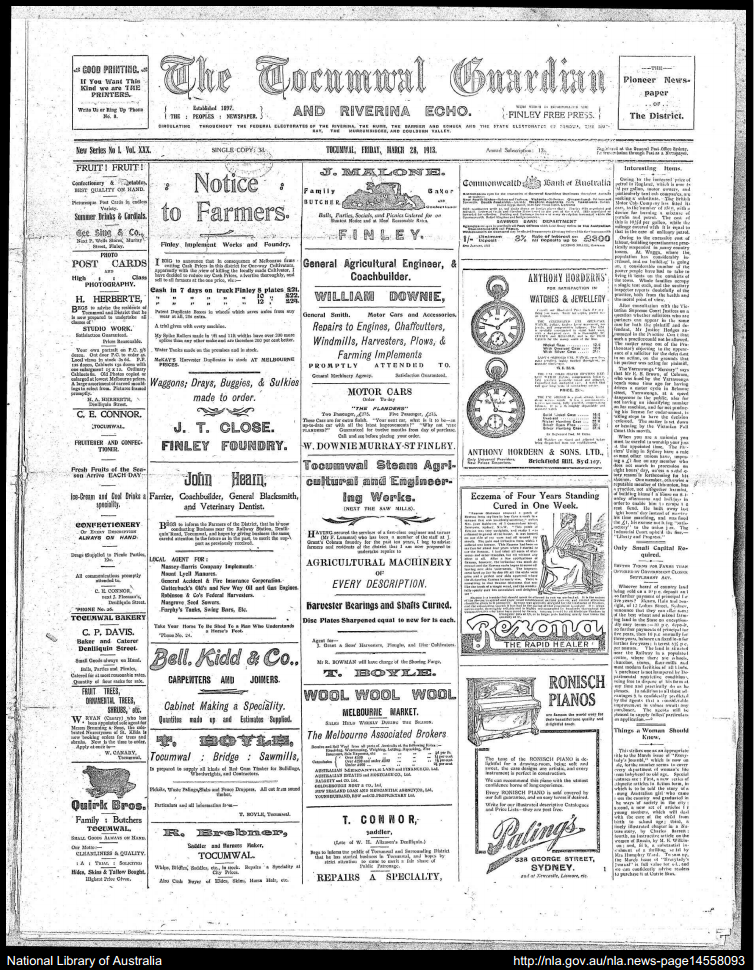
Front page of Tocumwal Guardian and Riverina Echo on 28 March 1913.

The Tocumwal Guardian and Riverina Stock Journal was a newspaper published in Tocumwal, New South Wales, Australia. It was published under a number of different titles from 1897 to 1970.

== History ==
The Finley Free Press and Tocumwal, Berrigan, Jerilderie and Deniliquin Chronicle was first published on 15 January 1897. In 1901 the title was shortened to the Finley Free Press and Tocumwal Guardian. The name was altered to The Tocumwal Guardian and Finley Free Press in 1908 and to Tocumwal Guardian and Riverina Echo in 1913. The name was changed to its final version of Tocumwal Guardian and Riverina Stock Journal in 1956. In 1970 the Tocumwal Guardian was merged with the Finley Mail and the Berrigan Advocate to produce the Southern Riverina News.

== Digitisation ==
The paper has been digitised as part of the Australian Newspapers Digitisation Program project of the National Library of Australia.

== See also ==
- List of newspapers in Australia
- List of newspapers in New South Wales
