= Koonoomoo =

- Town
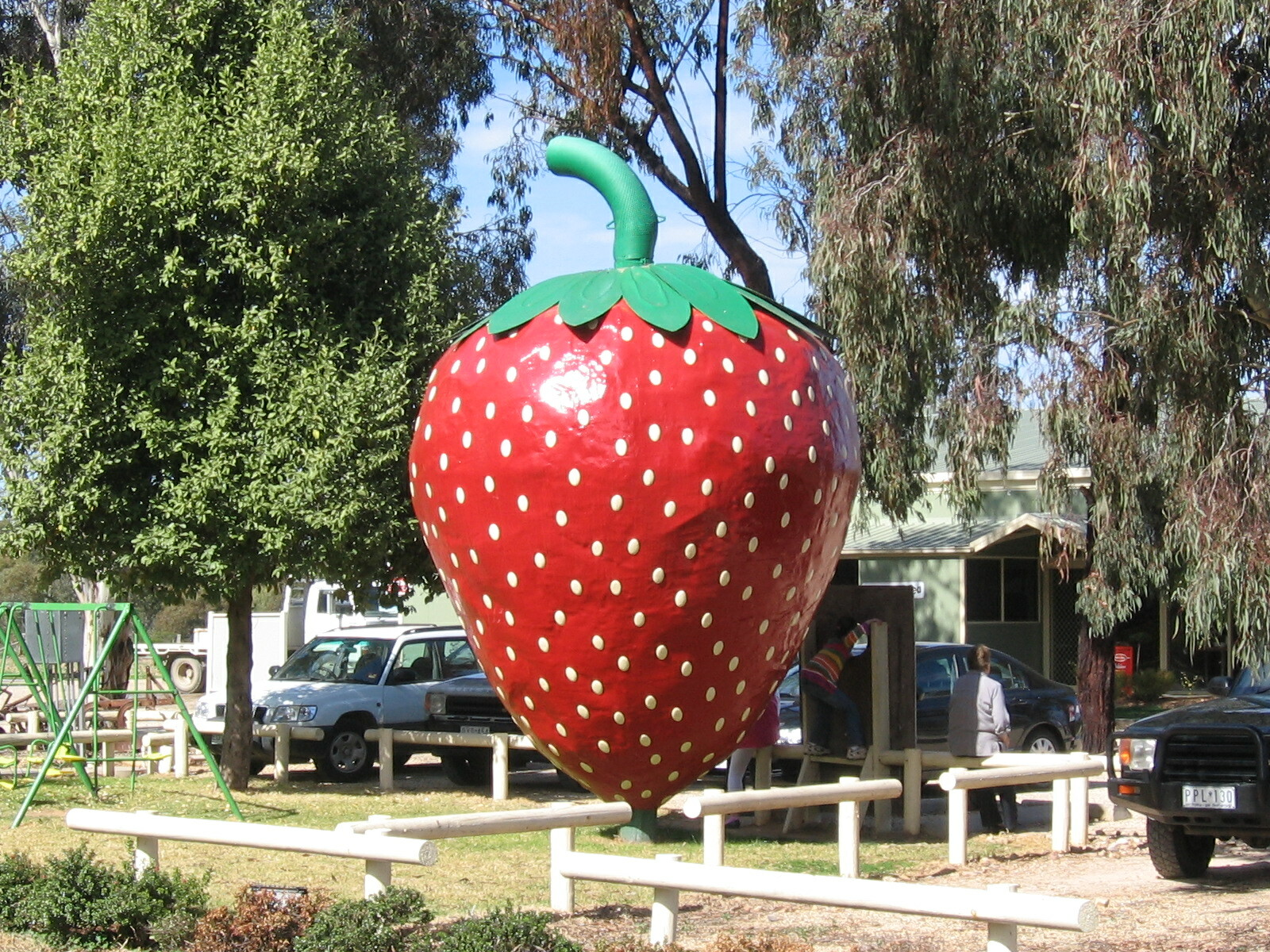
- The "Big Strawberry"

- Coordinates: 35°53′S 145°34′E
- Country: Australia
- State: Victoria
- Region: Hume
- LGA: Shire of Moira
- Location: 264 km (164 mi) N of Melbourne; 74 km (46 mi) N of Shepparton; 8 km (5.0 mi) NW of Cobram; 10 km (6.2 mi) S of Tocumwal

Government
  - State electorate: Ovens Valley
  - Federal division: Nicholls

Population
  - Total: 255 (2011 census)
- Postcode: 3644
Localities around Koonoomoo
New South Wales	Tocumwal (NSW)	Lalalty (NSW)
Mywee	Koonoomoo	Barooga (NSW)
Strathmerton	Yarroweyah	Cobram

Koonoomoo /ˈkuːnʊmuː/ is a town in northern Victoria, Australia. The town is located in the Shire of Moira local government area, 264 kilometres (164 mi) north of the state capital, Melbourne on the Goulburn Valley Highway, near the Murray River. At the 2011 census, Koonoomoo had a population of 255.

The town is probably best known for its strawberry farms and the Big Strawberry, part of an Australian trend to build large roadside attractions. Also it is home to the Cobram State Forest which attracts many visitors.

Koonoomoo had a Post Office only for a brief period in 1917. Nearby Mywee Post Office to the west on the Shepparton railway line was open between 1911 and 1974.

On 21 March 2013 the town was struck by a violent EF4 tornado.
