= Strathmerton railway station =

Former railway station in Victoria, Australia

Coordinates: 35°55′35″S 145°28′51″E

Strathmerton
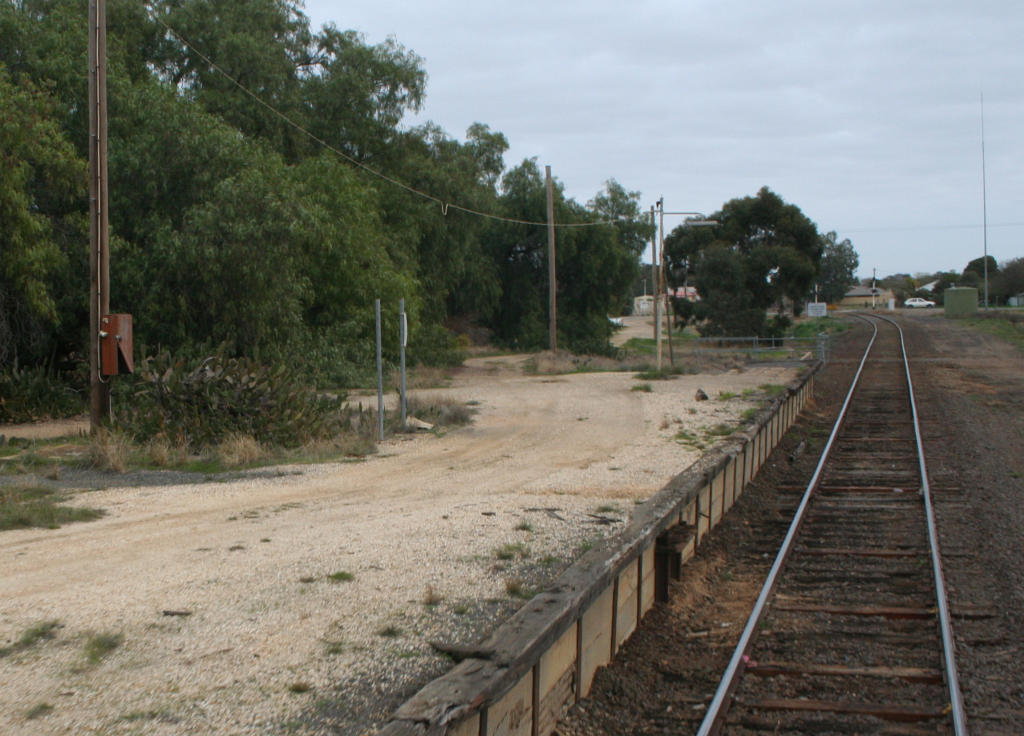
- Station platform looking south

General information
- Lines: Goulburn Valley (Tocumwal and Cobram)
- Platforms: 1
- Tracks: 1

Other information
- Status: Closed

Services
Preceding station	Disused railways	Following station
Katunga	Shepparton line	Mywee
Katunga	Cobram line	Yarroweyah
	List of closed railway stations in Victoria	
Location

Strathmerton is a closed railway station on the Goulburn Valley railway in Victoria, Australia serving the town of the same name,. The station opened at the same time as the railway from Shepparton to Cobram on 1 October 1888, with the line to Tocumwal opening on 28 February 1905, ending at a temporary terminus on the south side of the Murray River, the line not completed into Tocumwal until July 1908. The junction between the lines was to the north of the station, facing down trains.

Passenger services to Tocumwal ended on 8 November 1975, with the last train operated by T class diesel locomotive T324 hauling 3AS, 31BE, 2AE and 22CE. Before that, the Strathmerton - Cobram section of the line had been operated as a branch line, with a 102hp Walker railmotor connecting with the main line train. A bus service was introduced for the Tocumwal line, connecting with the Cobram service. By 1977/78 the service between Cobram and Tocumwal was being operated by a VicRail-owned station wagon driven by the Cobram station master.

Passenger services to the station were discontinued in 1981 when the Numurkah to Cobram passenger service ended as part of the New Deal timetable, although they were resumed in 1983.

The station building was replaced by a shelter in 1990.

The ultimate closure was in 1993, and the Cobram passenger service was cut back to Shepparton.

Strathmerton had a disused and run-down platform, and two disused home signals for up trains at the down end of the station. The points for the Cobram line have been lifted, with freight trains continuing to use the line north to Tocumwal.

The platform was demolished by 26 May 2026.

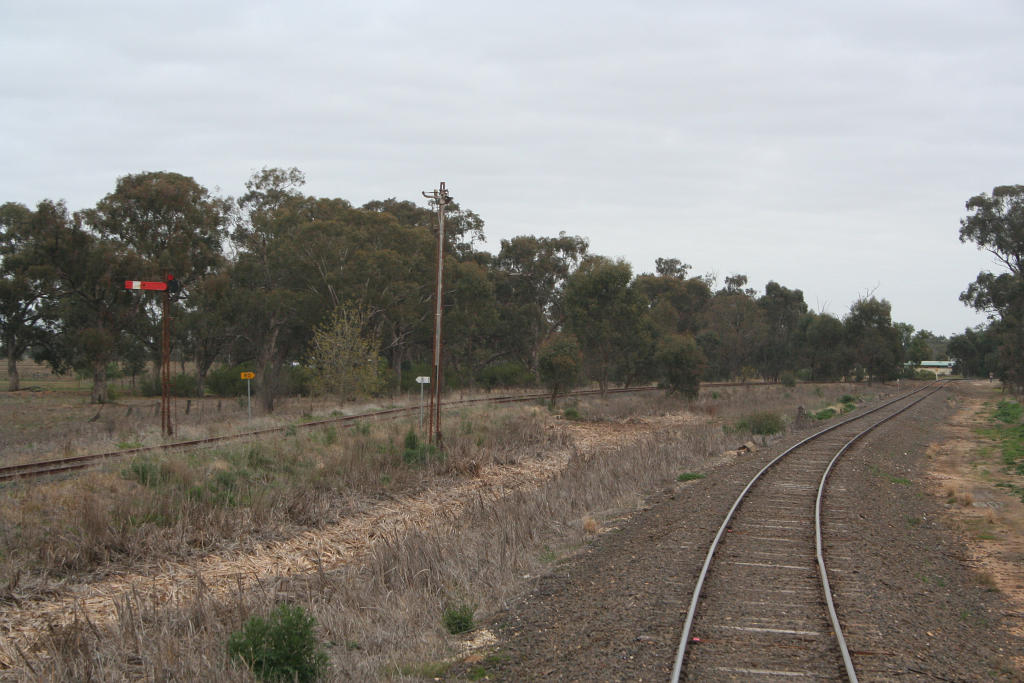
Junction between the lines to Cobram (left) and Tocumwal (right) looking south towards the station, 2007

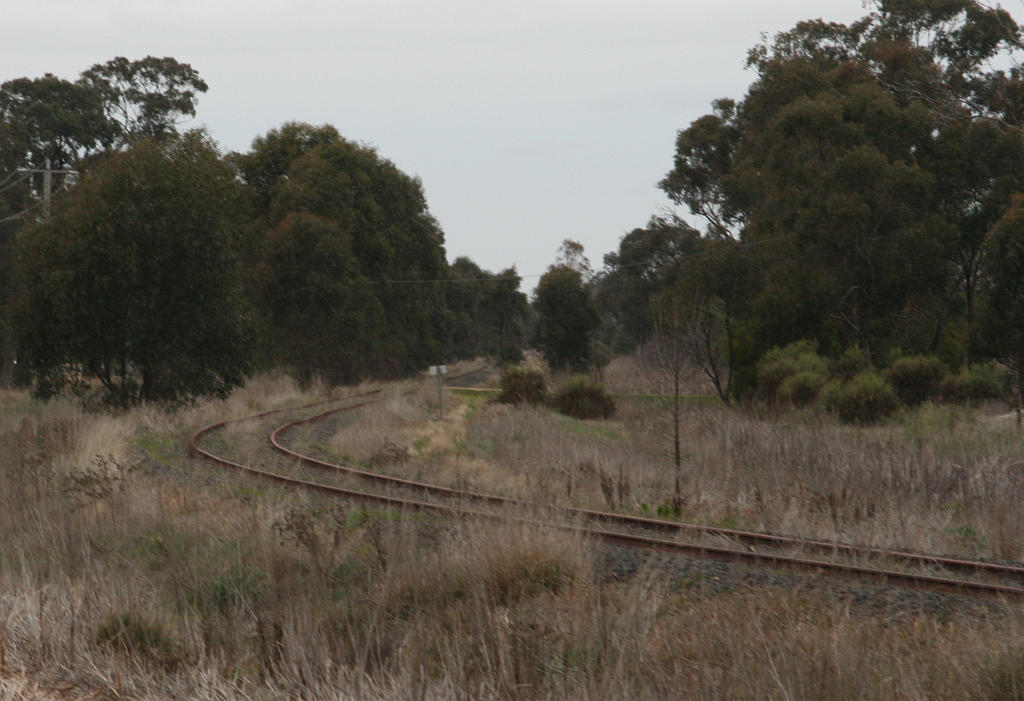
Cobram line headed east, 2007
