= Mywee =

- Town
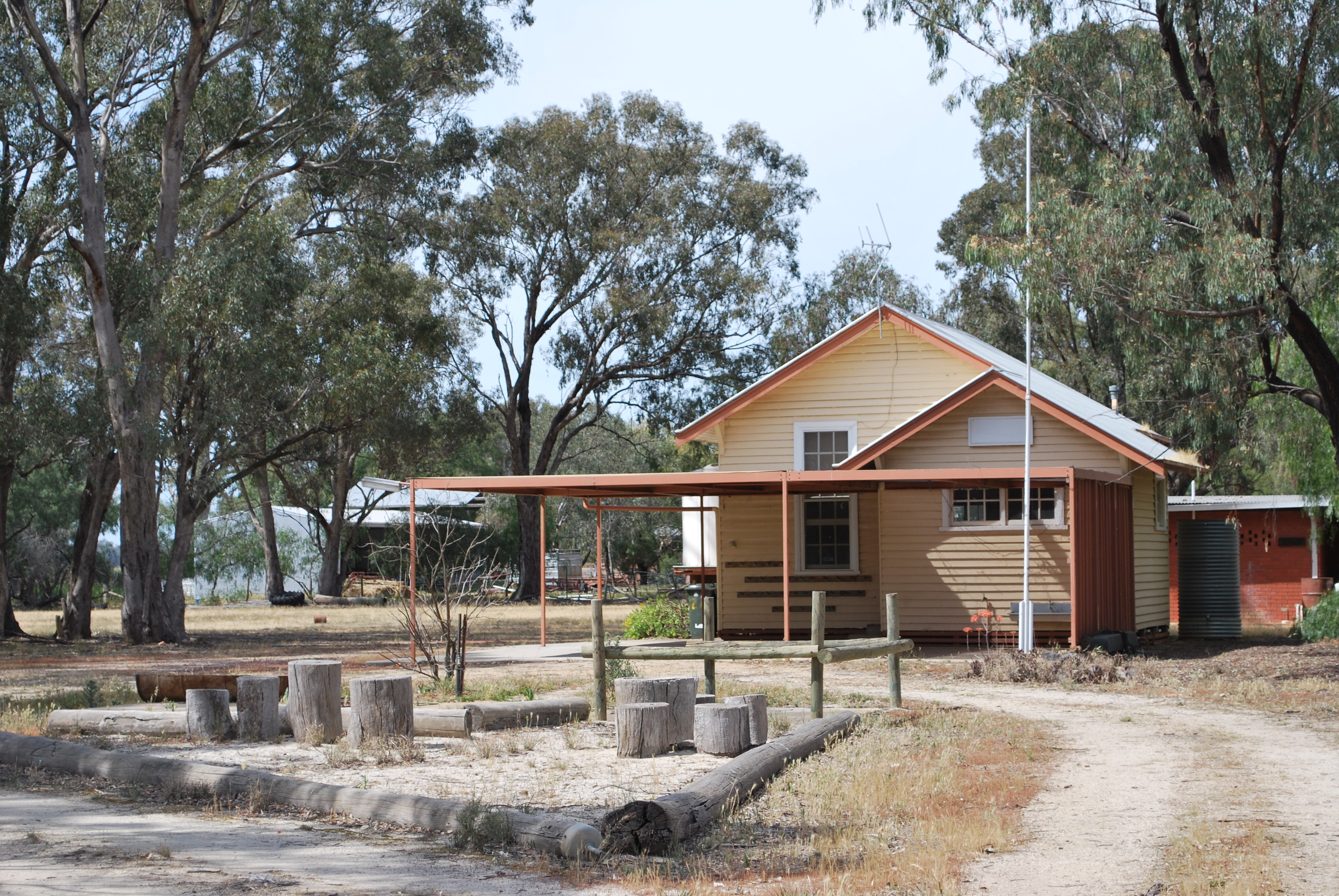
- Mywee Primary School, now a closed site and formerly a school.

- Coordinates: 35°50′48″S 145°29′46″E
- Country: Australia
- State: Victoria
- Region: Hume
- LGA: Shire of Moira

Government
  - State electorate: Shepparton
  - Federal division: Nicholls

Population
  - Total: 14 (2016 census)
- Postcode: 3641
Localities around Mywee
| Ulupna | Finley (NSW) | Tocumwal (NSW) |
| Strathmerton | Mywee | Koonoomoo |
| Strathmerton | Strathmerton | Koonoomoo |

Mywee (signifying "a well") is a locality in northern Victoria, Australia. It is in the local government area of Shire of Moira. Mywee was also known as "Sheepwash Creek".

There is a closed railway station named Mywee Railway Station on the Tocumwal Railway Line. Mywee post office opened on 1 November 1911, and closed on 30 September 1974.

Mywee state school now closed, opened 1894 and rebuilt July 10, 1944.
