= Cobram railway line =

Overview
- Status: Closed and dismantled
- Termini: Strathmerton; Cobram
- Stations: 2

Service
- Operators: Victorian Railways; V/Line

History
- Work began: April 1887
- Opened: 1 October 1888
- Last passenger service: 21 August 1993
- Line closed: 1999

Technical
- Number of tracks: 1
- Track gauge: 1,600 mm (5 ft 3 in) Victorian broad gauge

The Cobram railway line was a short branch of the Tocumwal line in the north-eastern region of the Victorian railway network.

== Origins ==
A town began to develop near pastoralist Octavius Philpott's Cobram Station around 1868. The Great Central Railway League, formed to advocate for construction of a line from the main north-eastern corridor to Shepparton, included Cobram in its estimates of potential patronage. When the Shepparton line was extended further north towards Numurkah and the Murray River, however, and a line to Yarrawonga was constructed from Benalla on the north-eastern line, landholders in Cobram became concerned they would be "beyond a reasonable radius of any station."

When extension of the line from Numurkah to Tocumwal to meet the New South Wales Government Railways system was recommended in 1879, Cobram residents began lobbying local politicians for a diversion of the route to serve the east of the town. Ultimately when the infamous Octopus Act of the Victorian Parliament passed in 1884, authorising a vast program of government railway construction across the colony, it included a railway from Numurkah to Cobram and none to Tocumwal.

Building contractors for the Victorian Railways, Messrs. Shaw, Monie and Mixner, began work on the line in April 1887 with around 50 labourers. Construction was delayed by severe weather that winter, and although the Railway Commissioners' promise that the line would be complete by the summer harvest could not be fulfilled, local residents were told to expect the use of some of the line. The contractors were hauling small amounts of wheat to meet the main railway in May the following year when an inexperienced driver derailed his train returning to Numurkah. The line officially opened on 1 October 1888 simultaneously with eight other railway lines around the state.

The decision to construct a line to Cobram in lieu of Tocumwal was heavily criticised, and an article in The Age accused Premier of Victoria and Minister for Railways Duncan Gillies of "meddling" in the design. The article observed that the landholdings of a "prominent member of the Legislative Council" had appreciated significantly in value as a result of the decision, and asked "what occult influence induced the Minister to drag the line out of its natural course to Cobram?" When Victorian Railways Commissioner Richard Speight sued The Age for libel in the following years, on the basis on a series of such articles alleging widespread corruption in the operation of the Octopus Act, lawyers for the newspaper pointed out that the three daily trains on the Cobram branch brought an average revenue of fewer than 15 shillings each.

When, in 1904, a decision was taken to meet the New South Wales Government Railways system at Tocumwal with construction of a new line, Cobram residents vehemently protested the construction of a junction at Strathmerton, which would leave the Cobram line a branch instead of on the main route from the river to Melbourne. The project went ahead as proposed and the Victorian line to Tocumwal was completed in 1905.

== Operation ==
Before the opening of the Tocumwal line, the single-track Cobram line was served by a single daily return mixed train from Melbourne, via Seymour and Shepparton, with a scheduled journey time of just under 8 hours. By 1918, the main train continued on to Tocumwal and a connecting service operated on the Cobram branch. In 1928, a railmotor service connecting with an additional train to Numurkah on a Wednesday night, returning on a Thursday morning, had been added.

After the Second World War, the VR introduced its new Walker railmotor, and expanded passenger services on the Cobram line along with other branches across the state. By 1969 this meant two railmotor services ran in each direction between Cobram and Numurkah every day except Sunday to connect with trains to and from Melbourne. Three goods services were scheduled on the line each week.

== Demise ==
Passenger numbers in the region had declined substantially by 1975, and the service between Strathmerton and Tocumwal was replaced by a bus in November, connecting with trains that now ran through to Cobram. At times, the number of passengers was so low that the Cobram station master drove ongoing travellers to Tocumwal in a station wagon. The rail service was cut back to Numurkah in 1981 but restored in the 1983 New Deal for Country Passengers.

By then, apart from around 5,000 tonnes (4,900 long tons; 5,500 short tons) of annual grain traffic on the line, by far the smallest amount carried on any branch between Shepparton and Tocumwal, freight had almost entirely disappeared from the Cobram line. Nevertheless, when the Tocumwal line was considered as a candidate for gauge standardisation as a secondary link to New South Wales, the VR intended to retain the connection to the Cobram branch. The project did not eventuate.

In 1993, the government of Premier Jeff Kennett announced it intended to end passenger train services on most of the Victorian country network, including the line from Seymour to Cobram. After negotiating substantial reductions in operating costs with railway unions, the government agreed to retain the Cobram service, among others. Ultimately, however, when the operation of the line was put to private tender, the winning bid by Hoys Roadlines replaced the service north of Shepparton with a bus. The last passenger train to Cobram ran on 21 August 1993.
