= Numurkah railway station =

Former railway station in Victoria, Australia

Coordinates: 36.0924°S 145.4371°E

Numurkah
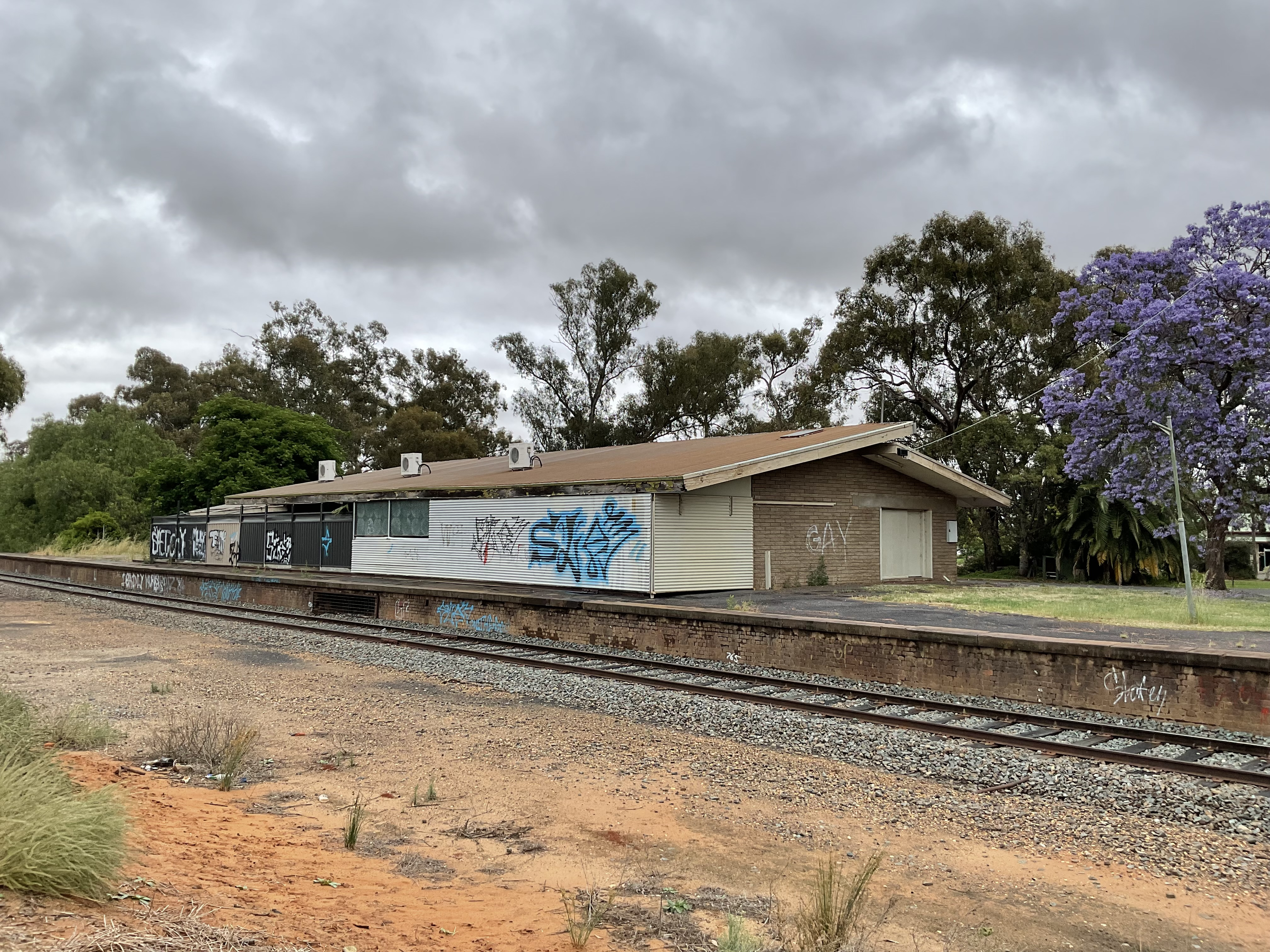
- Southbound view of the station, November 2023

General information
- Line: Goulburn Valley
- Platforms: 1
- Tracks: 1

Other information
- Status: Closed

History
- Opened: 1881
- Closed: 1993

Services
Preceding station	Disused railways	Following station
Wunghnu	Goulburn Valley line	Katunga
Junction	Picola line	Waaia
	List of closed railway stations in Victoria	
Location

Numurkah is a closed railway station on the Goulburn Valley railway line, which once served the town of the same name, in Victoria, Australia.

== History ==
The station opened on 1 September 1881, as the terminus of the railway from Shepparton. The line was extended north to Strathmerton and Cobram in October 1888, as well as a short distance west to Nathalia. The latter line was extended to Picola in 1896, as the Picola line, with the junction located to the north of the station, at the down end.

New station buildings were opened on 29 May 1969, and were refurbished in 1985. Passenger services beyond the station to Cobram were discontinued in 1981, as part of the New Deal timetable, but were resumed in 1983. The final closure of the Cobram passenger service was in 1993, when it was cut back to Shepparton.

During August 1998, the interlocked frame and signal quadrants at Numurkah were abolished, along with all fixed signals, signal posts, main line points, along with a number of sidings, including the road leading to the silos, and the turntable, leaving Numurkah unavailable for trains to cross. The main line was also realigned slightly at the down end of the yard.

== Station ==
Present facilities at the station include a disused platform, a station building, now leased to a local business, a footbridge over the tracks, and grain silos. The station once had a turntable but it has been replaced by a small garden.

== Gallery ==
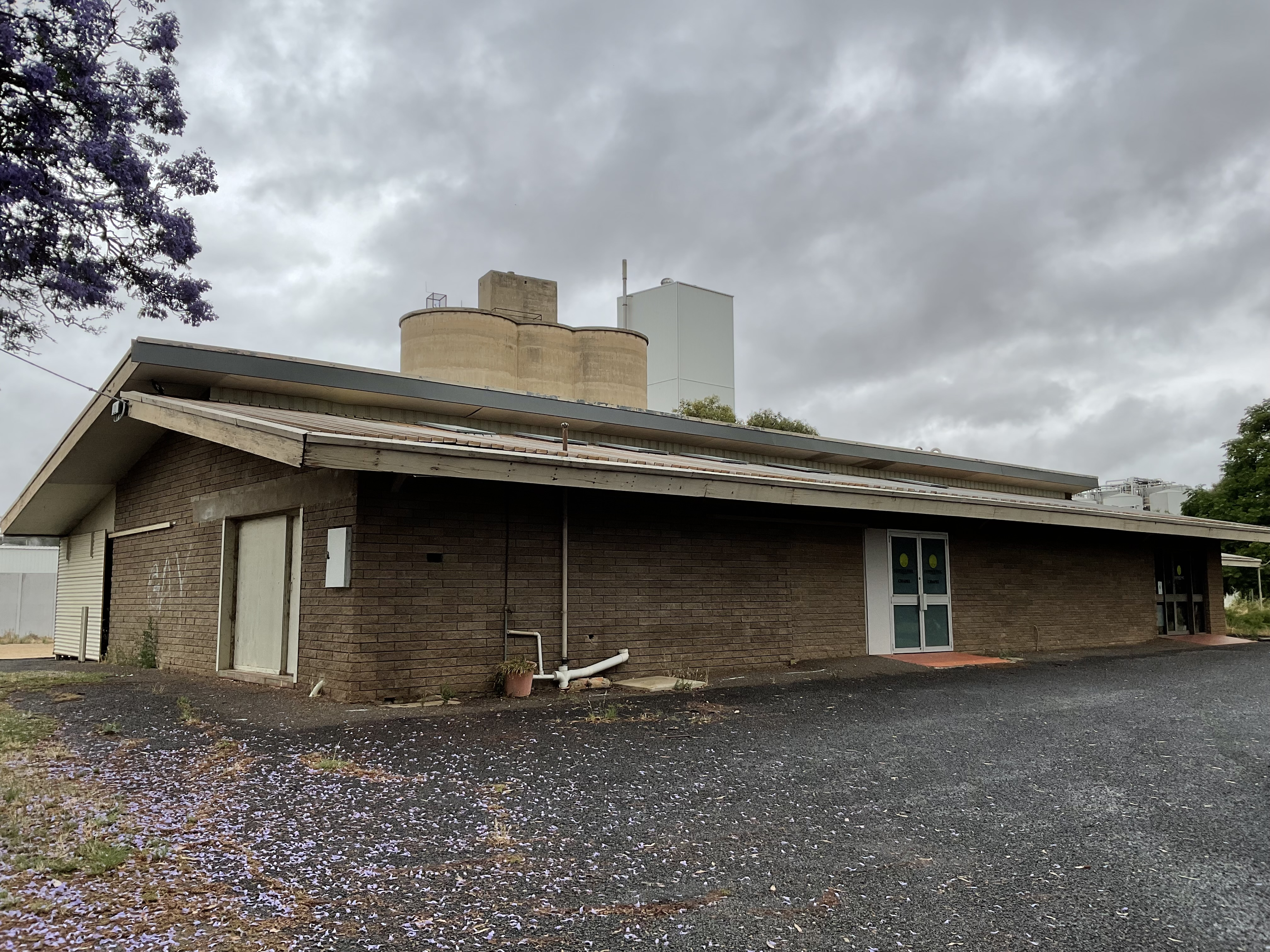
Station entrance, November 2023

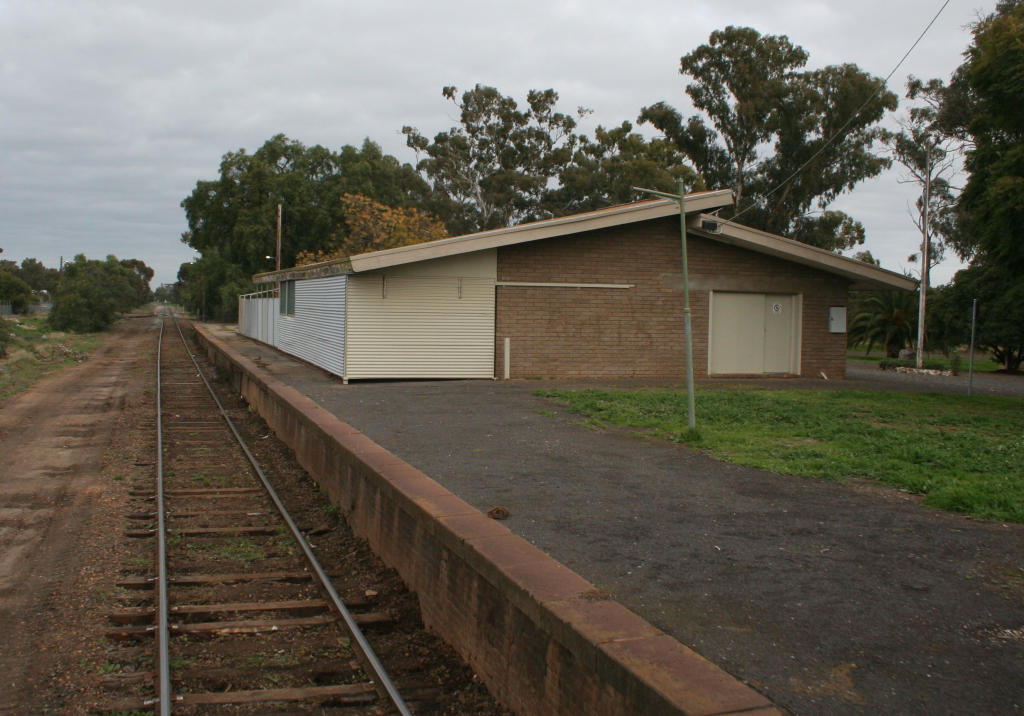
Station building and platform, July 2007

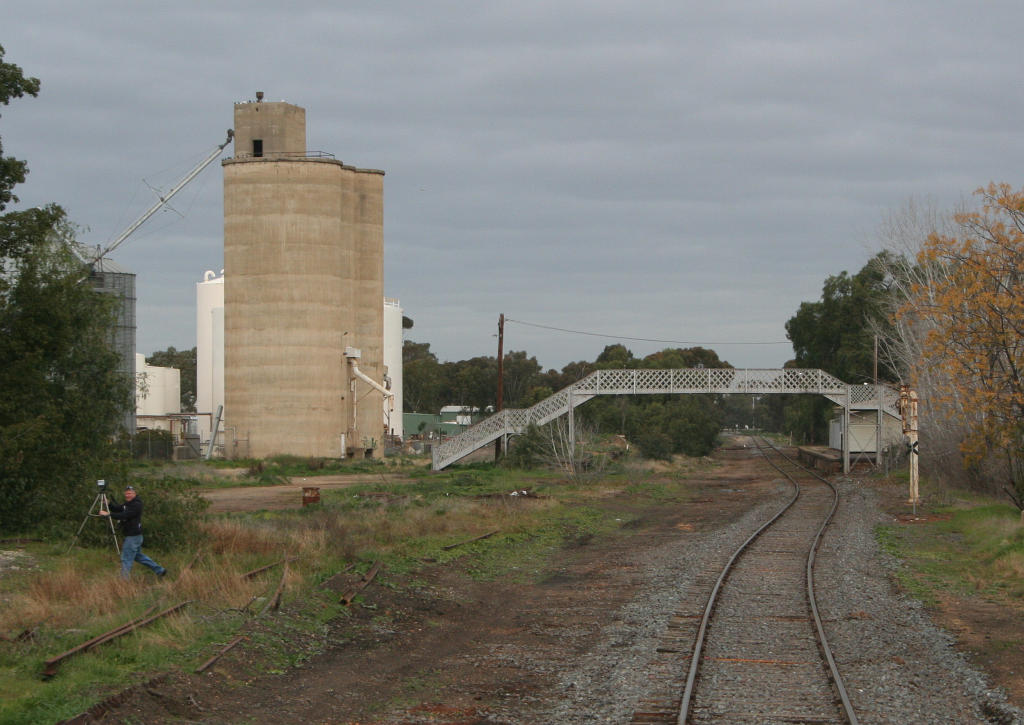
Looking south with platform to the right, July 2007

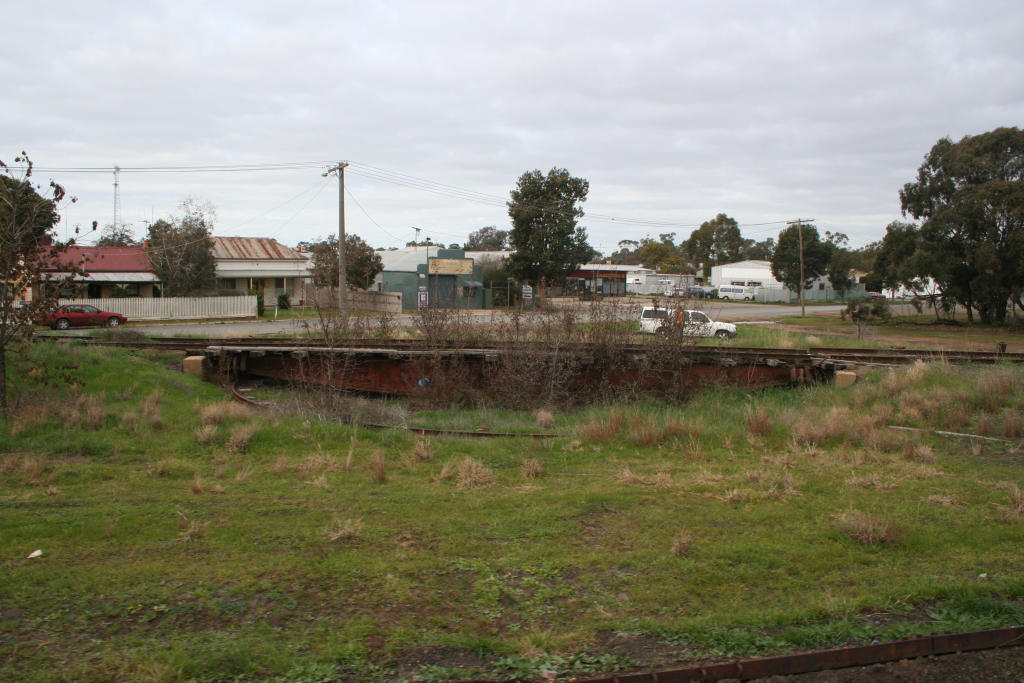
Disused turntable, July 2007

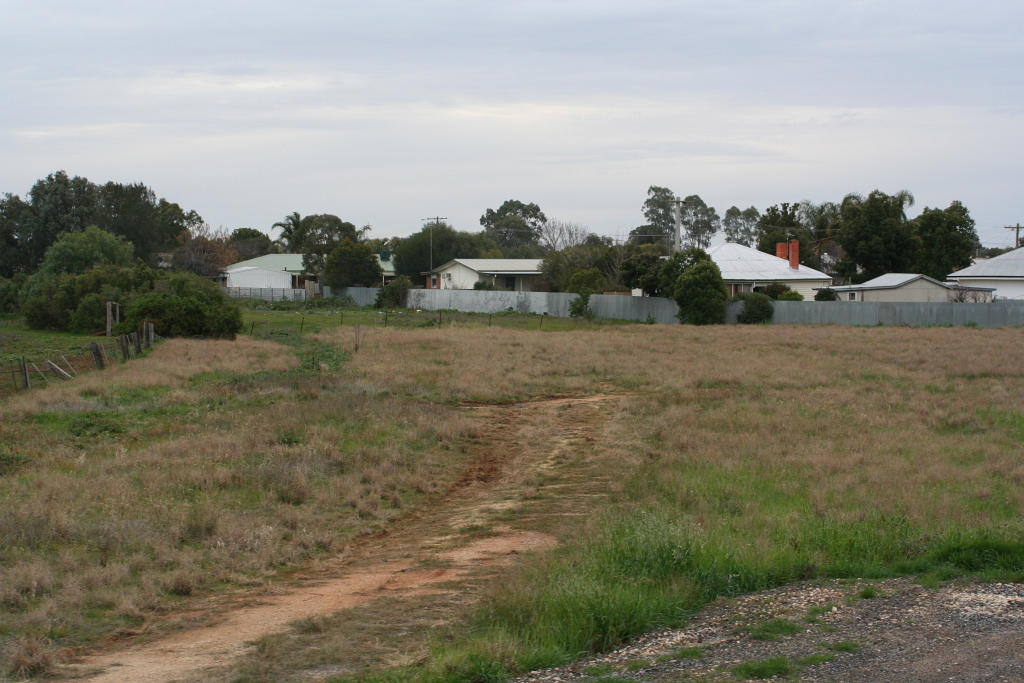
Reservation of the closed Picola branch, headed west from the main line, July 2007
