= Katunga railway station =

Former railway station in Victoria, Australia

Coordinates: 36°00′06″S 145°27′29″E

Katunga
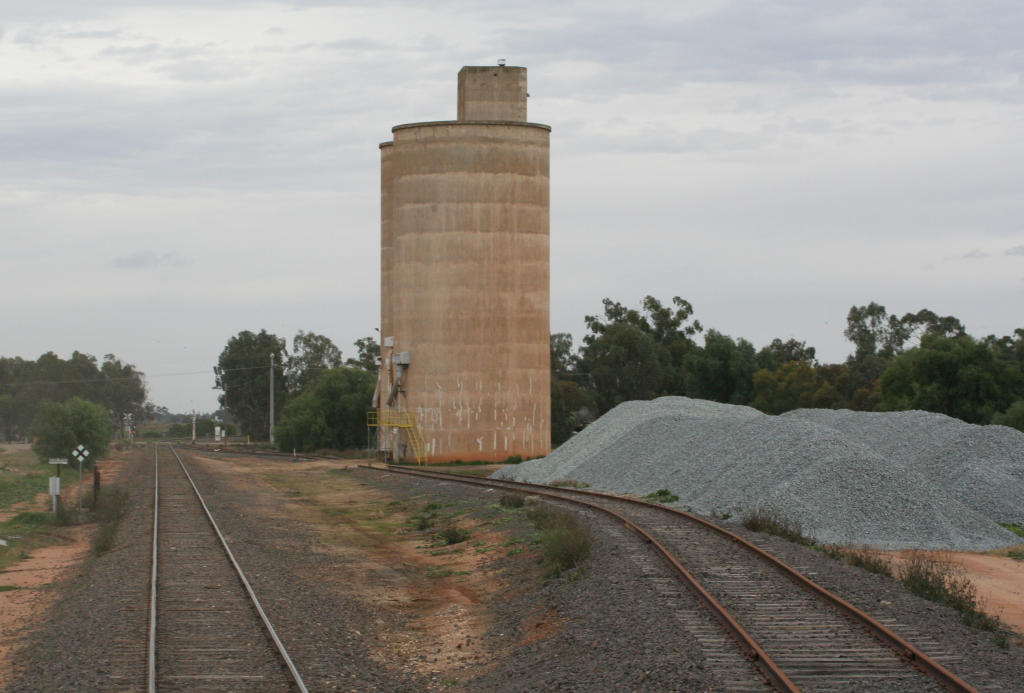
- Station site looking north, grain silo and loop siding, 2007

General information
- Line: Goulburn Valley
- Platforms: 0
- Tracks: 2

Other information
- Status: Closed

History
- Opened: 1 October 1888
- Closed: 5 September 1978

Services
Preceding station	Disused railways	Following station
Numurkah	Goulburn Valley line	Strathmerton
	List of closed railway stations in Victoria	
Location

Katunga is a closed railway station on the Goulburn Valley railway in Victoria, Australia, which served the township of the same name. The station was opened on 1 October 1888, at the same time as the railway from Numurkah to Strathmerton.

The station was closed to passengers in September 1978, but there is still a grain silo at the site, served by a loop siding.
