= Bearii =

- Town
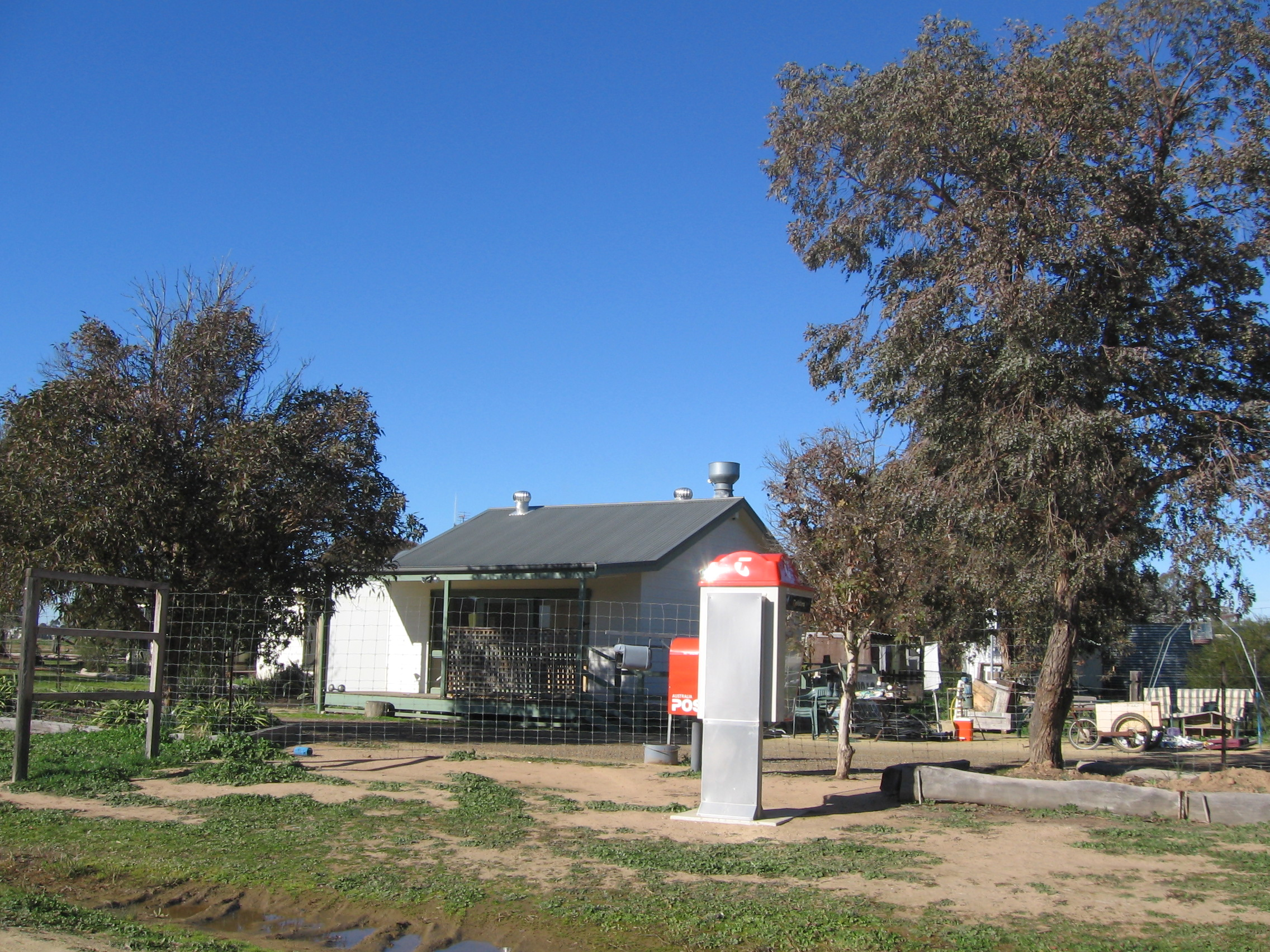
- Former shop at Bearii

- Interactive map of Bearii
- Coordinates: 35°54′S 145°20′E
- Country: Australia
- State: Victoria
- Region: Hume
- LGA: Shire of Moira
- Location: 252 km (157 mi) N of Melbourne; 63 km (39 mi) N of Shepparton; 30 km (19 mi) NE of Nathalia; 16 km (9.9 mi) W of Strathmerton
- Established: c. 1875

Government
  - State electorate: Shepparton
  - Federal division: Nicholls

Population
  - Total: 145 (2016 census)
- Postcode: 3641
Localities around Bearii
New South Wales	New South Wales	New South Wales
Yalca	Bearii	Strathmerton
Yalca	Yalca	Strathmerton

Bearii (/ˈbɪəraɪ/ BEER-eye) is a town in Victoria, Australia. The town is in the Shire of Moira local government area. Bearii is located 252 kilometres (157 mi) north of the state capital, Melbourne, 18 kilometres (11 mi) north of Waaia and is just south of the Barmah National Park. At the 2011 census, Bearii had a population of 136, by 2016 the town had 145 citizens.

== History ==
Bearii was surveyed for a township about 1875 and named by Mr Stein, an early settler after a place bearing that name in Germany.

The streets are named after some of the early settlers, amongst these are Myers, Tallon, Coghill, Williams and Stein streets.

Bearii Post Office opened on 10 November 1913 and closed in 1956.
