= Murray River road and railway bridge, Tocumwal =

Historic bridge at Tocumwal, New South Wales, Australia

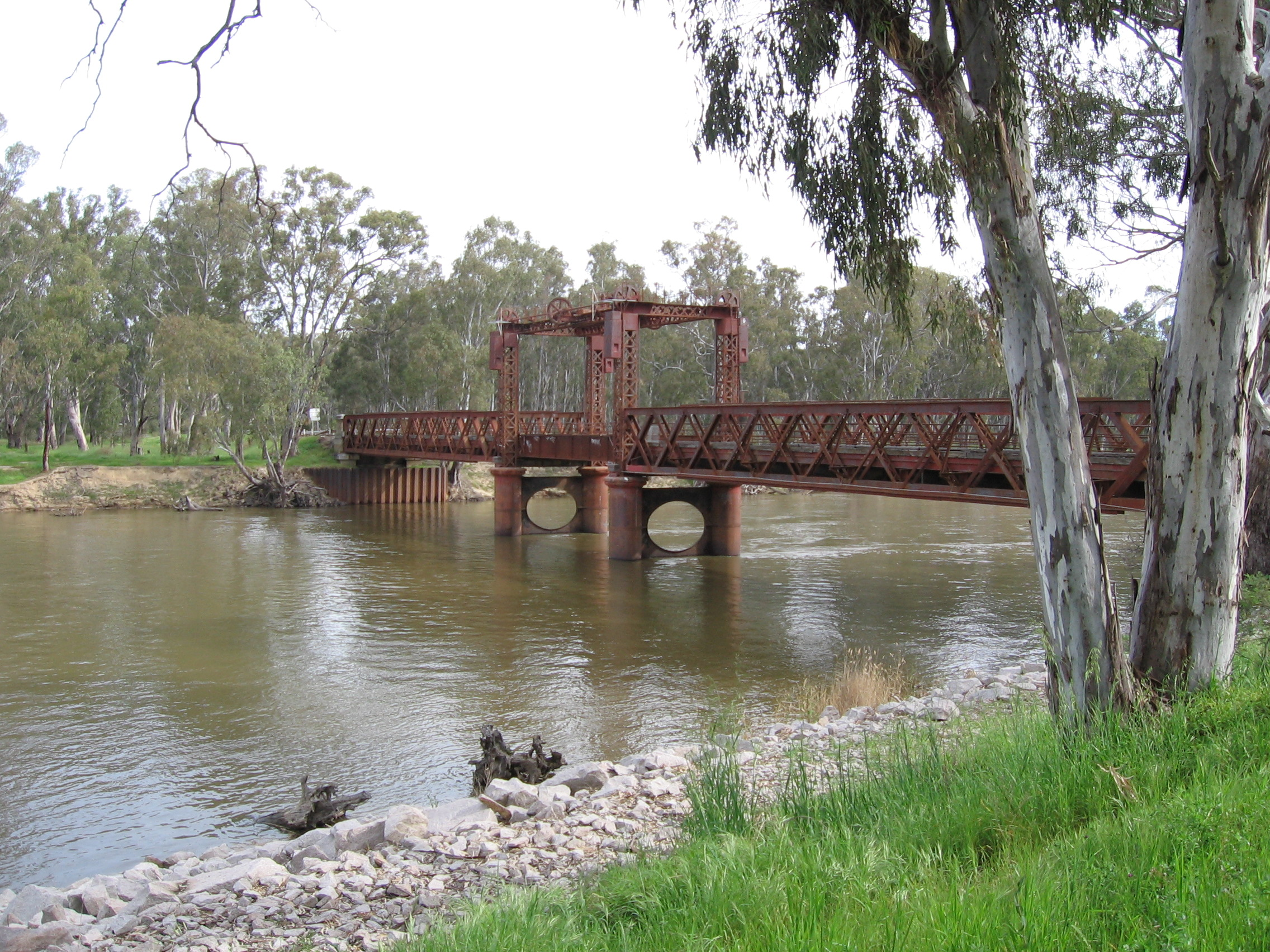
- The Tocumwal Bridge, viewed from Tocumwal, New South Wales
- Coordinates: 35°48′48″S 145°33′24″E
- Carries: Tocumwal railway line (since 1908); Motor vehicles (1895–1987)
- Crosses: Murray River
- Locale: Tocumwal, New South Wales, Australia
- Begins: Tocumwal, New South Wales
- Ends: north of Boomagong, Victoria
- Other name(s): Tocumwal road and rail bridge over Murray River
- Owner: Transport Asset Manager of New South Wales
- Preceded by: Edward Hillson Bridge, Tocumwal (Goulburn Valley Highway)
- Followed by: Barmah Bridge, Barmah

Characteristics
- Design: Truss lift span
- Material: Cast iron
- No. of spans: 3
- Piers in water: 2

Rail characteristics
- Track gauge: 5 ft 3 inch (1,600mm)

History
- Constructed by: NSW Public Works Department
- Opened: 1895
- Inaugurated: Easter 1895 by James Young, NSW Secretary for Public Works and Sir Maurice O'Rorke

New South Wales Heritage Register
- Official name: Tocumwal road and rail bridge over Murray River
- Type: State heritage (built)
- Designated: 2 April 1999
- Reference no.: 1061
- Type: Railway Bridge / Viaduct
- Category: Transport – Rail
- Builders: NSW Public Works Department

Location
- Interactive map of Murray River road and railway bridge, Tocumwal

The Murray River road and railway bridge is a heritage-listed railway and former road bridge that carries the Tocumwal railway line across the Murray River at Tocumwal, New South Wales, Australia. It is also known as the Tocumwal Road and Rail Bridge over Murray River. The property is owned by the Transport Asset Manager of New South Wales.

== History ==
The Truss lift span bridge over the Murray River opened in 1895, and was constructed by the NSW Public Works Department. It has three spans, the centre span having an opening lift-span for navigation. Initially provided for road traffic only, it was strengthened for rail traffic in 1908, and was used for both road and rail traffic until November 1987. The Edward Hillson Bridge opened on 9 November 1987, located a short distance upstream, the concrete road bridge carries the Goulburn Valley Highway across the Murray, with the old bridge used for rail traffic only since 1987.

When opened, monthly lifting of the centre span was carried out for testing purposes. When the bridge was made a rail and road bridge, the span was always kept down unless enquired by river traffic. By 1930, river traffic declined, and so by 1944, the monthly lifting was altered to yearly. In 1951, it was proposed to keep the span closed, the last lift for river traffic being in 1933, and no maintenance lifting having been carried out for a decade. In September 1977, both state governments agreed to keep it fixed, and removed requirement for being able to lift it. Easter 1995 celebrations including operation of the lift span.

== Heritage listing ==
The river bridge was a combined road and rail structure. It is of very high significance because of its technological value and its importance in the history of transport in the State and inter-state rivalries.

Tocumwal road and rail bridge over the Murray River was listed on the New South Wales State Heritage Register on 2 April 1999.

== See also ==
- List of railway bridges in New South Wales
- List of bridges in Australia
- List of crossings of the Murray River

Next crossing upstream	Murray River	Next crossing downstream
Edward Hillson Bridge	Murray River road and railway bridge, Tocumwal	Barmah Bridge
