= Strathmerton =

- Town
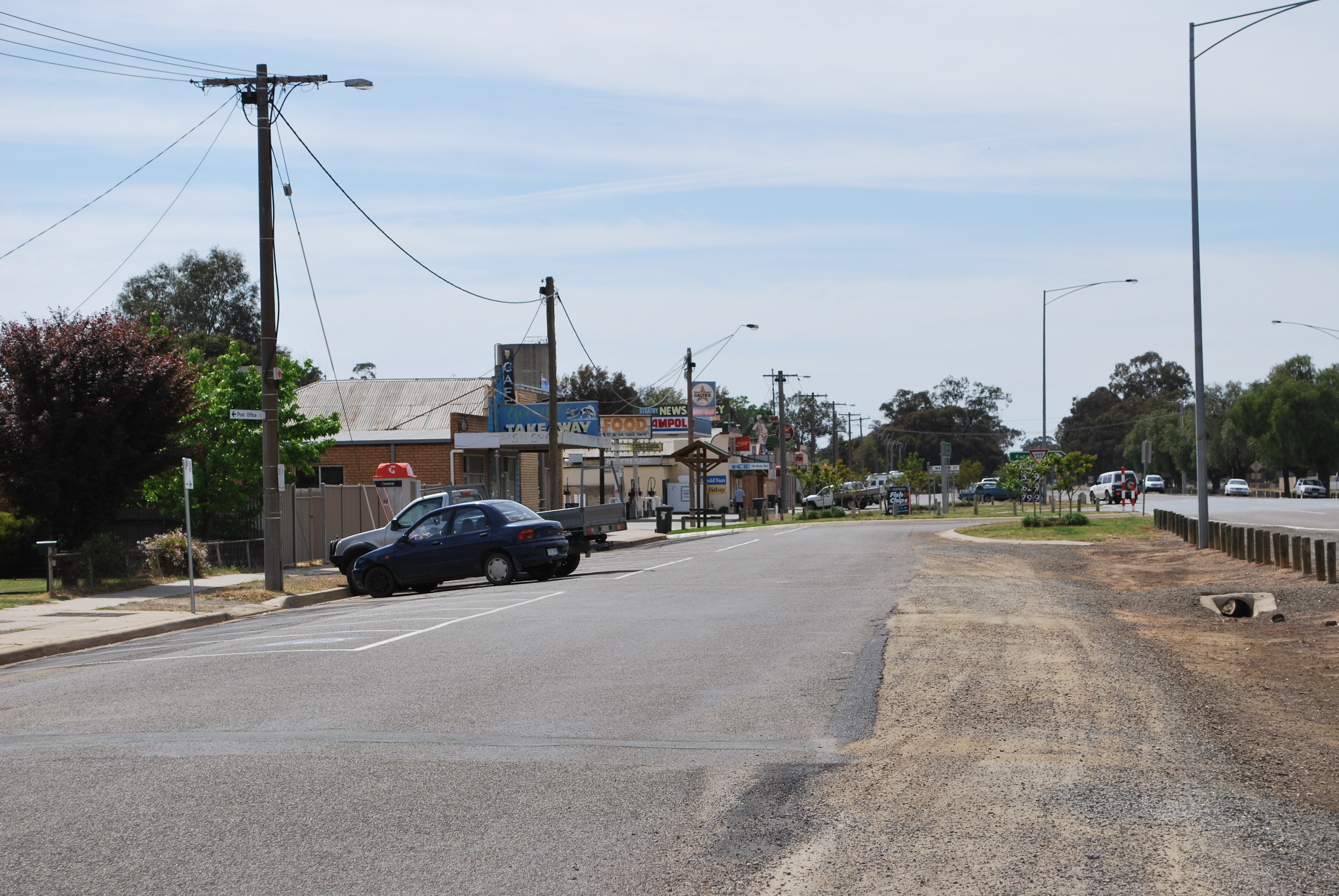
- Main street, Strathmerton

- Interactive map of Strathmerton
- Coordinates: 35°55′0″S 145°29′0″E
- Country: Australia
- State: Victoria
- Region: Hume
- LGA: Shire of Moira
- Location: 238 km (148 mi) north of Melbourne; 56 km (35 mi) north of Shepparton; 11 km (6.8 mi) west of Cobram

Government
  - State electorate: Shepparton
  - Federal division: Nicholls

Population
  - Total: 1,072 (2021 census)
- Postcode: 3641
Localities around Strathmerton
New South Wales	Ulupna	Mywee, Koonoomoo
Bearii	Strathmerton	Yarroweyah
Yalca	Katunga	Katunga

Strathmerton is a town in Victoria, Australia. It is located in the Shire of Moira local government area on the Murray Valley Highway and Goulburn Valley Highway, about 11 kilometres (7 mi) west of Cobram. At the 2021 census, Strathmerton had a population of 1072.

== Toponymy ==
Benjamin Boyd, who was one of the earliest landowners in the district, initially named his property 'Ulupna'. He later changed it to Strathmerton from 'Merton', the name of his family home in Scotland, and 'strath', a Gaelic word meaning 'valley'.

== History ==
Strathmerton Post Office opened on 1 September 1879. In 1888 on the arrival of the railway a Strathmerton Township Post Office opened near the station. In 1891 this was renamed Strathmerton.

The local railway station was opened on the railway to Cobram in 1888, with the line to Tocumwal opened in 1905. The last regular passenger service was in 1993. Before road changes, Strathmerton was known as the intersection of the Goulburn Valley Highway and the Murray Valley Highway and was the northernmost town directly north of Melbourne still in Victoria.

The Kraft factory in Strathmerton was acquired by Bega Cheese in December 2008, with Bega claiming that production would double in the following five years. On 6 May 2025, Bega announced their intention to shut down their Strathmerton factory by mid-2026, in a move that was expected to save the company $30 million annually. The layoffs are expected to directly affect around 300 employees within the area, and cause a negative ripple-on effect for the township.

== Today ==
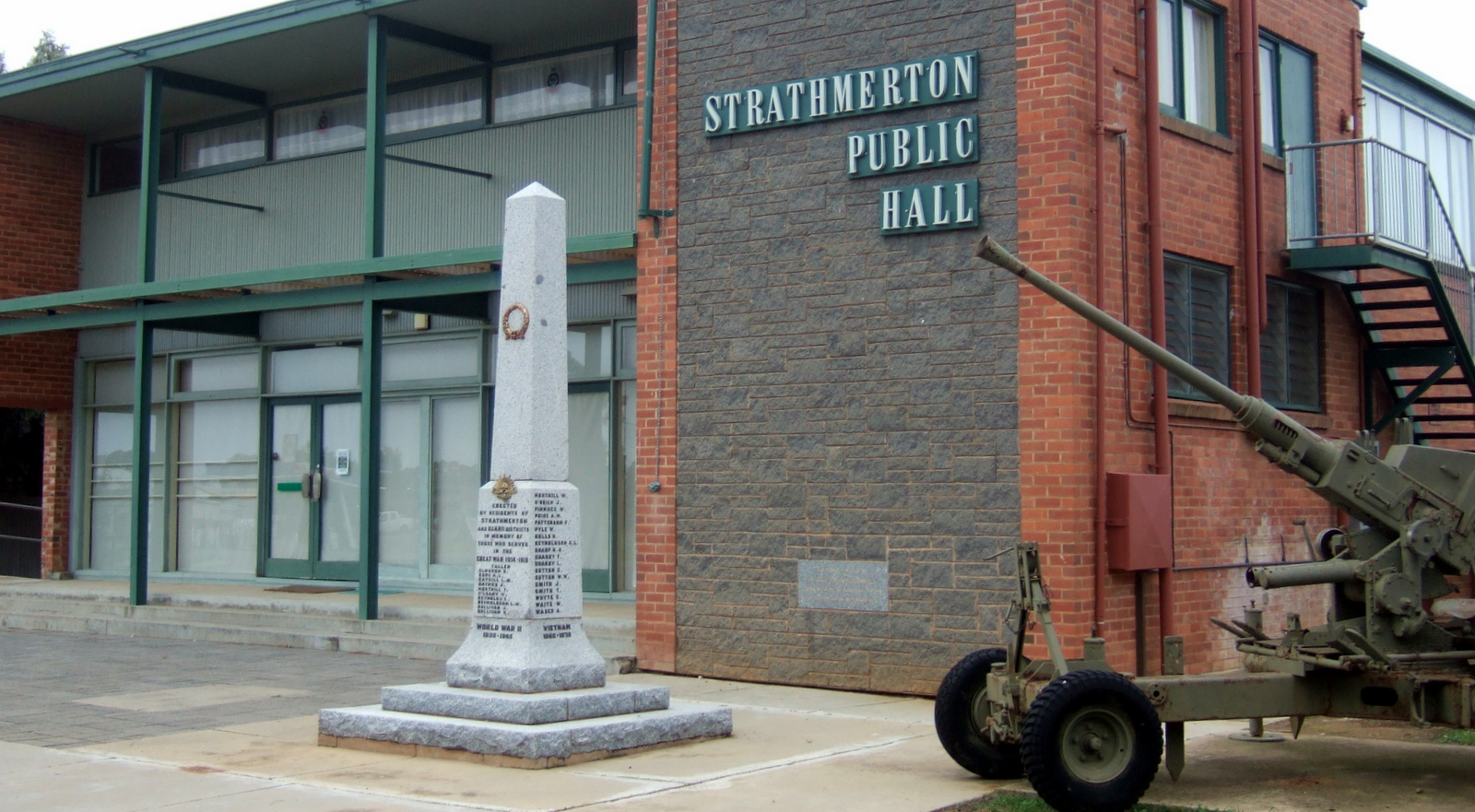
Strathmerton Public Hall

The town is served by the Strathmerton Primary School. Other than a few small businesses, the only company of note is the Booth Transport Milk Transfer Depot. The surrounding rural area consists of mainly irrigated dairy and fruit farms. There are several beaches and camping spots just to the north of Strathmerton along the Murray River in and adjacent to the Barmah State Forest.

The local football team, Strathmerton Football Club competes in the Picola & District Football League. The Strathmerton Lawn Bowls Club is a popular social and recreational focal point for locals and visitors.

Golfers play at the course of the Strathmerton Golf Club.

== See also ==
- Strathmerton railway station
