= Cobram =

- Town
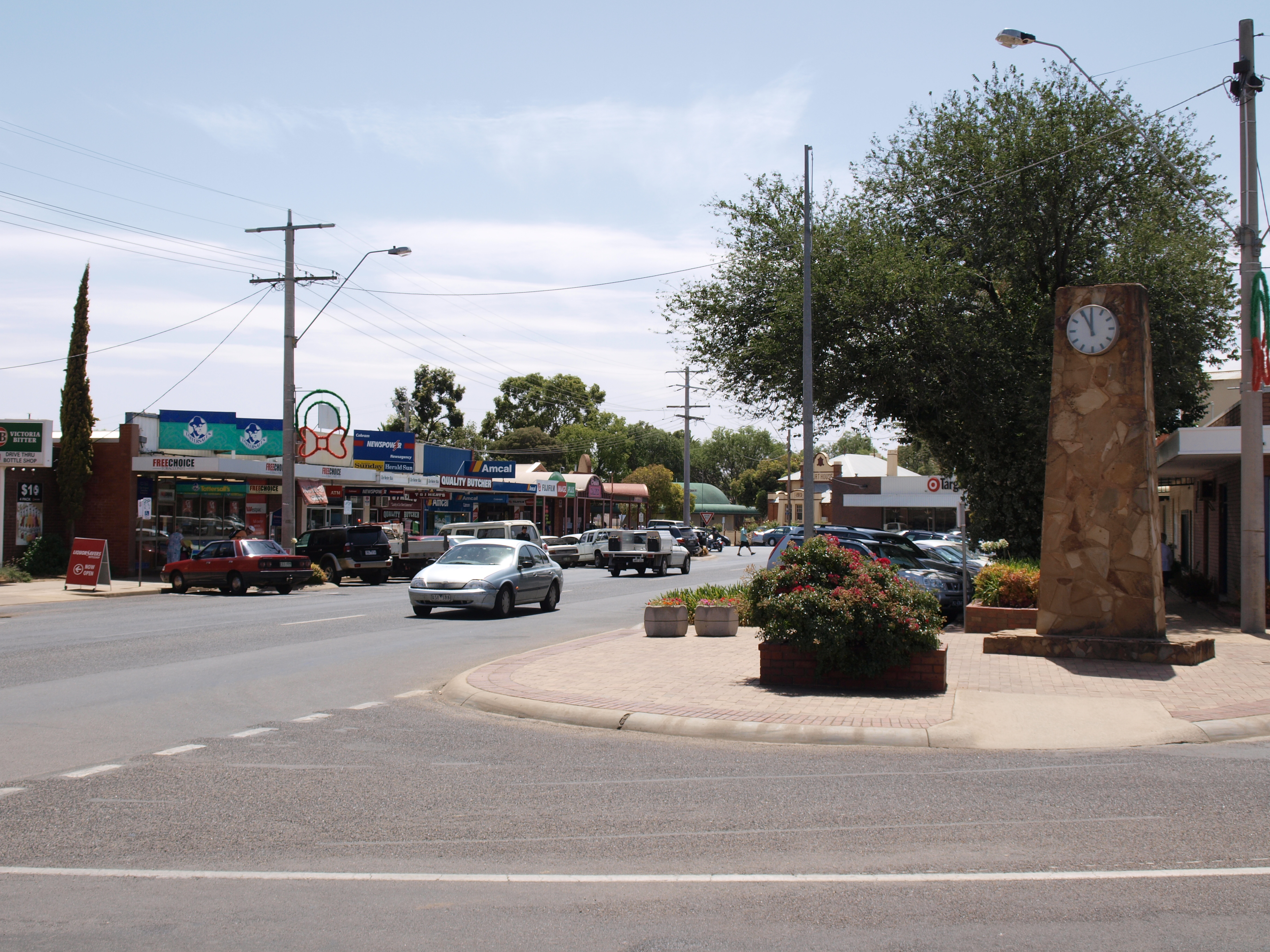
- Punt Road

- Interactive map of Cobram
- Coordinates: 35°55′25″S 145°39′20″E
- Country: Australia
- State: Victoria
- Region: Hume
- LGA: Shire of Moira
- Location: 246 km (153 mi) N of Melbourne; 67 km (42 mi) NE of Shepparton; 37 km (23 mi) W of Yarrawonga
- Established: 1888

Government
  - State electorate: Ovens Valley
  - Federal division: Nicholls

Area
  - Total: 83 km^{2} (32 sq mi)
- Elevation: 114 m (374 ft)

Population
  - Total: 6,148 (2021 census)
  - Density: 74.1/km^{2} (191.8/sq mi)
- Time zone: UTC+10 (AEST)
  - Summer (DST): UTC+11 (AEDT)
- Postcode: 3644
- County: Moira
- Mean max temp: 23.0 °C (73.4 °F)
- Mean min temp: 9.6 °C (49.3 °F)
- Annual rainfall: 449.0 mm (17.68 in)
Localities around Cobram
Koonoomoo	Barooga (NSW)	Boomanoomana (NSW)
Yarroweyah	Cobram	Cobram East
Katunga	Muckatah	Katamatite

Cobram is a town in Victoria, Australia. It is on the Murray River which forms the border between Victoria and New South Wales. Cobram along with the nearby towns of Numurkah and Yarrawonga is part of Shire of Moira and is the administrative centre of the council. Its twin town of Barooga is located on the north side of the Murray River. Surrounding Cobram are a number of orchards, dairy farms and wineries. At the 2021 census, Cobram had a population of 6,148. Barooga's population is currently 1,888.

== History ==
Aboriginals, although they had disappeared from the area prior to European settlement, were believed to inhabit the stretch of region bound by the Murray River from Tocumwal to the east of Cobram and south as far as the Broken Creek. The main tribe believed to have occupied the area were the Bangerang. A 'horde', or smaller grouping of about 100 persons, named Angootheraban, are believed to have lived in the immediate Cobram area.

Charles Sturt first passed through the region on the northern bank of the Murray River in June 1838 en route to South Australia, leading a cattle droving party, with 300 head of cattle.

In January 1845, Octavius Phillpotts established Cobram station between the already existing Yarrawonga and Strathmerton stations, located where Cobram East now is. This was divided into the Cobram and St. James stations in 1855.

By the 1860s, present day Cobram still hadn't begun to exist, and the area was still broadly referred to as Yarroweyah. In 1868, the old township of Cobram, bound by Warkil Street to the west and the Murray River to the east was reserved for future use, about 15 kilometres west of Cobram East.

Up until this time, the area of Cobram was part of the Echuca Shire, Cobram station was included when Yarrawonga Shire was created on 15 May 1878. It would later be part of the Tungamah shire in its creation on 17 February 1893. On 12 August 1879 the first school, 2166 Cobram, opened, later renamed Cobram East.

In 1886, the government produced the town plan for Cobram, as section 110. 1888 brought about the establishment of the township proper, with the opening of the primary school, Cobram 2881, in April, the opening of the Cobram Post Office near the court house on 1 May, and the coming of the railway on 1 October, which had been heavily publicised by the Cobram Courier, the town's newspaper, first issued 12 September of that year. It was also in 1888 that the first policeman was appointed, the first doctor arrived and Cobram Football Club played its first match along with the building of Cobram's first pub, the Royal Victoria Hotel, managed by Talford Gedye. A river punt began operating between Cobram and the New South Wales banks the following year.

The Cobram Post Office was moved to its present site on 23 February 1904, the first government building in town and the first built in Australia with the authority of the Commonwealth government.

Cobram township was finally proclaimed by John Fuller, Governor of Victoria, on 2 December 1912. Two years later, electricity for the town was being produced by a local coal-fired power plant.

St. Joseph's Catholic primary school was opened in 1922 and in 1925, the Cobram Golf Club opened a 9-hole course near the Murray Valley Highway, transferring three years later to the current location in Barooga.

Cobram adopted yet another town plan in 1949, the first rural Victorian town to do so, with high anticipation of population growth and the proliferation of industry. In 1950, the first of such expansions was realised, with the creation of the Murray Valley Co-operative Dairy Producers and Trading Company, the predecessor of Murray Goulburn Co-operative.

The town split from Tungamah Shire and Cobram Shire was formed on 1 April 1953, after increasing agitation from the townspeople with the operations of the Tungamah Shire. The first Shire President was Jordan Norman, a long-standing Cobram businessman. Almost ten years later, in 1962, the first high school opened in the town. In May 1972, the first connections to town sewerage were made, totaling 1,000 by 1976.

Through the 1980s and 1990s, Cobram was awarded many town awards, including Tidiest Town in Victoria in 1991 and 1993. In 1993, Cobram Shire was amalgamated with Yarrawonga, Numurkah, Nathalia and Tungamah Shires to form the Moira Shire.

== Present day ==
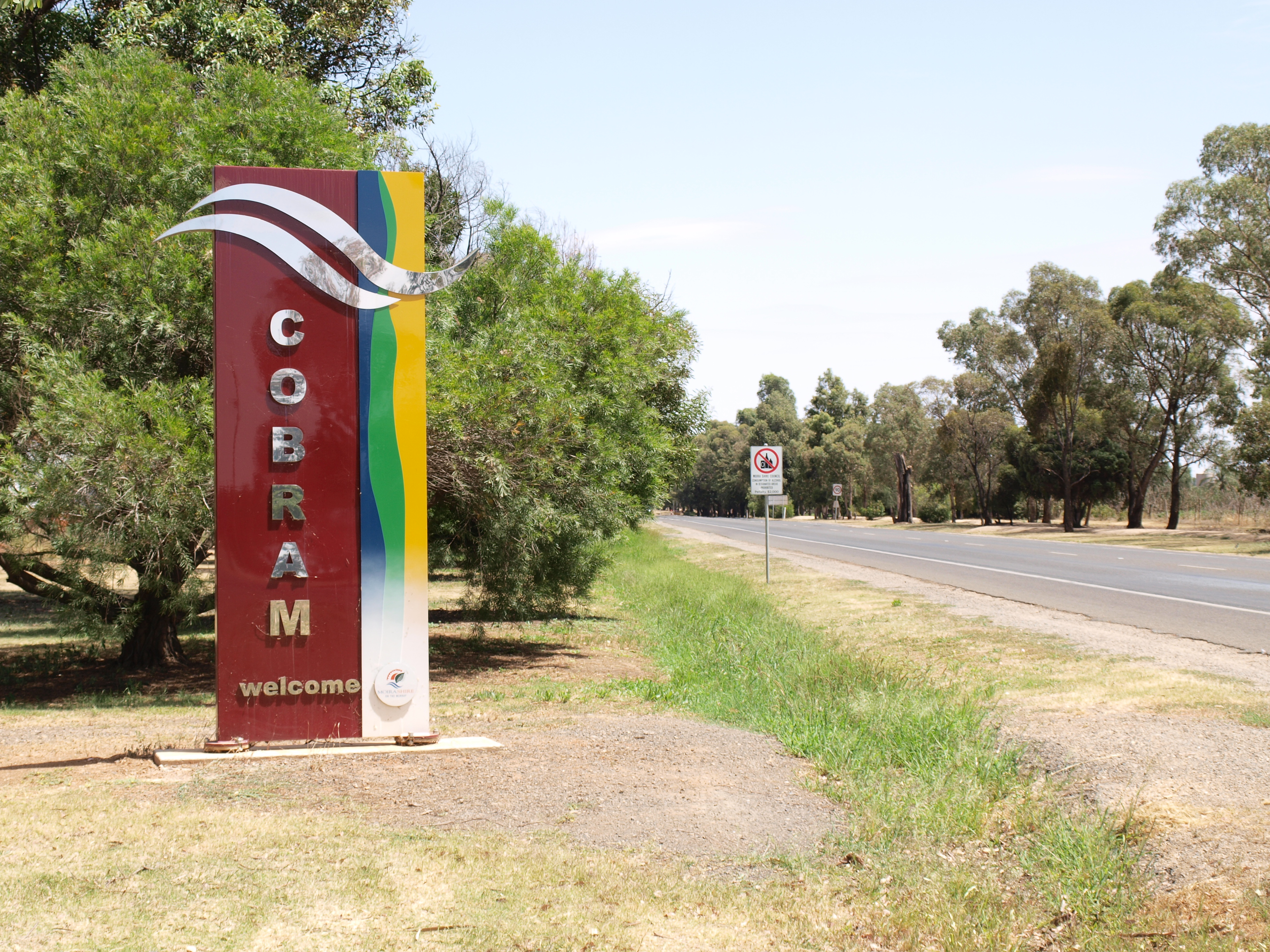
Murray Valley Highway, as approaching from Yarrawonga

Cobram serves as the headquarters for the Shire of Moira, is centrally located within the shire and is the second-largest town. Cobram has one government high school and a primary school, an Anglican prep to year 12 college, a Catholic primary school and a special developmental school. It also has a district hospital, built in 1949 with emergency department and an associated nursing home for the elderly.

There are numerous recreational facilities for public use, such as Scott Reserve, the Cobram Showgrounds, Cobram Lawn Tennis Club and of course the Murray River including Thompson's Beach. A large sports stadium is located adjacent to the Anglican College and Cobram Showgrounds, with numerous soccer fields, netball and tennis courts outside, along with indoor basketball, badminton, volleyball, tennis and netball courts.

The Melba Theatre first opened on 1 December 1948. Featuring a lobby and two cinemas, it was the first air-conditioned theatre in the region. A fire destroyed the cinema and caused damage to surrounding shops on 10 April 2010 and it was demolished the following day.

A Peaches & Cream Festival is held biennially around the second or third weekend in January. It is Australia's oldest-running festival, with a town parade and music festival located at Thompson's Beach.

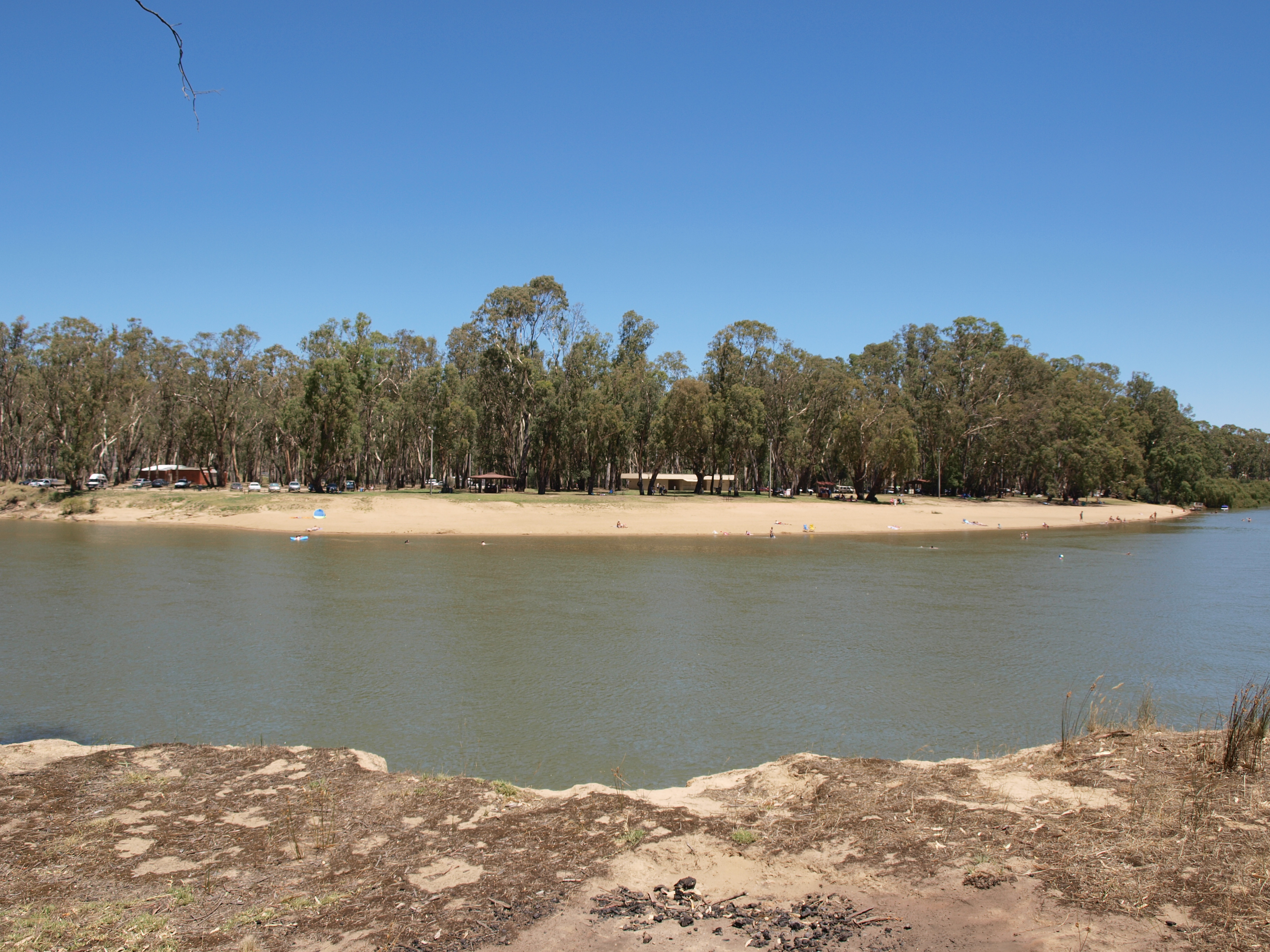
Thompson's Beach, as viewed from New South Wales.

Cobram is the birthplace of Murray Goulburn Co-operative, Australia's largest dairy co-operative, collecting 35% of Australia's milk produce through its numerous facilities throughout south eastern Australia. Murray Goulburn, along with the Meiji Dairy Corporation milk processing plant, a large abattoir and orange juice factories form the major industries of the town as well as serving as major employers.

Cobram is home to a large Muslim community of mainly Iraqi origin which continues to grow quickly, along with Italians who migrated in the post-war boom, and began a thriving fruit industry.

In 2006, the then 104-year-old De Burgh Truss road bridge over the river was replaced by a concrete type immediately adjacent to and upstream of the original bridge, named Cobram Barooga Bridge. The new bridge was built to a cost of $9.6 million and completed ahead of schedule.

Smaller towns located nearby include Strathmerton, home of a large Bega cheese processing plant, Yarroweyah, Katamatite, Katunga, Koonoomoo and the larger towns of Yarrawonga on the Victorian side and Tocumwal on the New South Wales side.

== Demographics ==
According to the 2016 census of Population, there were 6,014 people in Cobram.

- Aboriginal and Torres Strait Islander people made up 1.7% of the population.
- 75.8% of people were born in Australia. The next most common countries of birth were Italy 2.8%, England 2.2%, New Zealand 1.8% and India 1.7%.
- 80.3% of people spoke only English at home. Other languages spoken at home included Italian 4.1% and Arabic 2.2%.
- The most common responses for religion were Catholic 32.7%, No Religion 22.0% and Anglican 14.7%.

== Suburbs ==
Although there are no named suburbs in the town, there are areas which can be distinguished by locals due to their colloquial names.

The Mill End is the oldest area name, given to the old Cobram town bound by Warkil Street to the west and the river to the east, so named because of the timber mills that were once scattered in the area. It is still used, although not as commonly, by people and business.

Murray Heights is the name given to the estate of relatively recent residential area that runs along the sand hills of River Road on the town's eastern edge. The sandy mounds had previously been occupied by orchards.

Koonoomoo, Yarroweyah and Cobram East share the same post code as Cobram, as does Barooga despite being in NSW.

== Sport ==
Cobram has an Australian rules football team in the Murray Football League called the Cobram Tigers.

Cobram Roar is a soccer club formed in 2014 which participates in the Albury Wodonga Football Association. They are based at the Cobram Showgrounds.

Cobram also has two cricket teams which play in the Murray Valley Cricket Association.

Other popular sports played include basketball, table tennis, ballet, motocross, netball, lawn tennis, badminton and lawn bowls. Cobram Bowling Club is centrally located and has three grass greens. The club has two ladies' pennant teams and four Saturday pennant sides which participate in the Murray Bowls Association.

Golfers play at the Cobram Barooga Golf Club on Barooga Golf Course Road.

The Cobram Lawn Tennis Club hosts an annual tournament over Labour Day#Australia Weekend (usually the first weekend of March). It is attended by around 750 tennis players from around Victoria, with most travelling from Melbourne for the weekend. The tournament concludes with the finals on Labour Day Monday.

== Public transport ==
V/Line once serviced Cobram with regular daily passenger trains as part of the Shepparton service. These train services were discontinued in 1993. Now V/Line operates multiple daily return connecting coach services between Cobram and Melbourne, as well as multiple return services to Albury and Mildura.

NSW TrainLink, the New South Wales regional rail and coach provider, services Cobram with three-times-weekly return coach services 741 and 742 between Albury and Echuca.

== Climate ==
Cobram possesses a cool semi-arid climate bordering on a humid subtropical climate (Köppen: BSk/Cfa), with warm summers and cool winters. Average maxima vary from 32.0 °C (89.6 °F) in January to 13.9 °C (57.0 °F) in July while average minima fluctuate between 16.2 °C (61.2 °F) in January and 3.4 °C (38.1 °F) in July. Mean precipitation is quite low (averaging 449.0 mm (17.68 in) per annum). Cobram only receives 79.4 precipitation days annually, with a maximum frequency of rain in winter. The town is somewhat sunny, experiencing 130.1 clear days and 99.6 cloudy days per annum. Extreme temperatures have ranged from 46.5 °C (115.7 °F) on 25 January 2019 to −4.8 °C (23.4 °F) on 18 June 1998. All climate data was sourced from Tocumwal Airport, situated 11.2 km (7.0 mi) north of Cobram.

Climate data for Cobram (sourced from Tocumwal Airport) (35.82°S 145.60°E, 114 m AMSL) (1970-2022 normals & extremes, rainfall to 1897)
Month	Jan	Feb	Mar	Apr	May	Jun	Jul	Aug	Sep	Oct	Nov	Dec	Year
Record high °C (°F)	46.5 (115.7)	45.7 (114.3)	41.8 (107.2)	37.8 (100.0)	29.0 (84.2)	23.7 (74.7)	25.5 (77.9)	30.5 (86.9)	35.2 (95.4)	37.0 (98.6)	43.5 (110.3)	44.9 (112.8)	46.5 (115.7)
Mean daily maximum °C (°F)	32.0 (89.6)	31.5 (88.7)	28.1 (82.6)	23.1 (73.6)	18.3 (64.9)	14.7 (58.5)	13.9 (57.0)	15.7 (60.3)	18.9 (66.0)	22.8 (73.0)	26.9 (80.4)	29.7 (85.5)	23.0 (73.3)
Mean daily minimum °C (°F)	16.2 (61.2)	16.1 (61.0)	13.6 (56.5)	9.7 (49.5)	6.7 (44.1)	4.3 (39.7)	3.4 (38.1)	4.2 (39.6)	6.2 (43.2)	8.8 (47.8)	11.9 (53.4)	14.1 (57.4)	9.6 (49.3)
Record low °C (°F)	7.4 (45.3)	6.8 (44.2)	5.0 (41.0)	0.0 (32.0)	−2.1 (28.2)	−4.8 (23.4)	−4.3 (24.3)	−4.0 (24.8)	−1.5 (29.3)	−1.5 (29.3)	0.2 (32.4)	5.1 (41.2)	−4.8 (23.4)
Average precipitation mm (inches)	33.4 (1.31)	28.9 (1.14)	35.2 (1.39)	32.2 (1.27)	40.5 (1.59)	44.0 (1.73)	41.9 (1.65)	42.7 (1.68)	39.0 (1.54)	42.4 (1.67)	34.9 (1.37)	34.1 (1.34)	449.0 (17.68)
Average precipitation days (≥ 0.2 mm)	4.1	3.5	4.6	5.0	7.2	9.2	10.2	10.0	8.2	7.3	5.6	4.5	79.4
Average afternoon relative humidity (%)	33	35	38	46	57	65	65	57	52	45	38	33	47
Average dew point °C (°F)	10.9 (51.6)	11.9 (53.4)	10.6 (51.1)	9.2 (48.6)	8.6 (47.5)	7.3 (45.1)	6.4 (43.5)	6.0 (42.8)	7.2 (45.0)	7.6 (45.7)	8.3 (46.9)	8.9 (48.0)	8.6 (47.4)
Source: Bureau of Meteorology (1970-2022 normals & extremes, rainfall to 1897)

== Landmarks ==
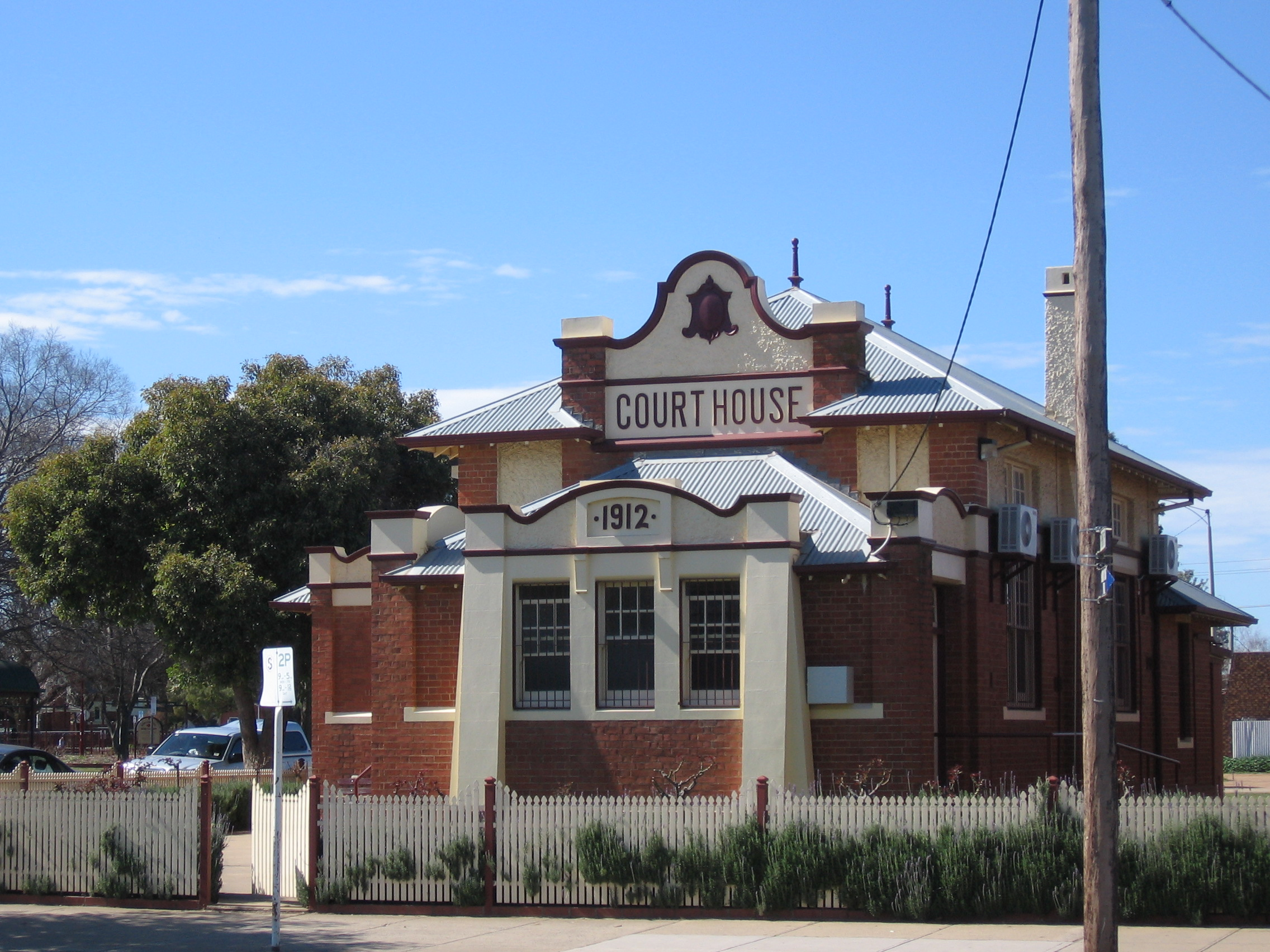
The 1912 court house.

A major landmark is the Cobram Bridge, a De Burgh truss lift bridge, which was built across the Murray in 1902. The Cobram Bridge is the only bridge on the Murray River whose construction was completely funded by the Victorian government. Tenders were awarded in November 1900 and the bridge was opened officially on 3 December 1902, two months after being open to traffic.

Other landmarks include the settlers' log cabin, war memorial and civic centre. Also of note is the Cobram courthouse, built in 1912, which continues to be utilised as the Cobram Magistrates' Court. Most of the old brick buildings were of local bricks, made by Samuel Steward. He has a monument on the Cobram to Barooga Road.

Cobram Station, built from 1905 to 1907, is a large homestead located east of the town on the Murray Valley Highway. The building comprises 250,000 bricks hand-made on site. It is currently a private residence.

Around the region are numerous river beaches, with Thompson's Beach, claimed to be the largest inland beach in Australia located just north of Mookarii Street, before crossing into New South Wales.

== Notable people ==
- Former Geelong Australian rules footballer Garry Hocking and Steven Hocking
- Former Geelong and Essendon Australian rules footballer John Barnes
- Former Olympic diver Dean Pullar.
