= Cobram railway station =

Former railway station in Victoria, Australia

Coordinates: 35°55′12″S 145°38′44″E

Cobram

General information
- Line: Cobram
- Platforms: 1
- Tracks: 2

Other information
- Status: Closed

History
- Opened: 1 October 1888
- Closed: 21 Aug 1993

Services
Preceding station	Disused railways	Following station
Yarroweyah	Cobram line	Terminus
	List of closed railway stations in Victoria	
Location

Cobram railway station is a former railway station in the town of Cobram, Victoria, Australia. Passenger rail services to the station ended when V/Line ceased operating passenger services in 1993, but a number of services continued to use the line until 1999.

The station is located in the centre of Cobram on Punt Road. The station building is now used by an arts group, and the station is served by a V/Line bus route. The tracks remain in place but are overgrown and the grain silos located on the down side of the station are no longer served by rail. The station has a platform and two tracks.

Currently the station is serviced by V/Line buses that run to Shepparton daily and buses that run to Albury and Mildura a few times a week. After closing the train service in 1993 the Cobram community has shown interest in re-opening the train service.

== Cut from main Shepparton Line ==
With the line presently physically disconnected from the main Shepparton Line just beyond the former Strathmerton Station, several km north of Shepparton itself, the re-establishment of a passenger and freight service will only be realised upon physical reconnection of the line to the Shepparton Line. With the entirety of the Cobram Line in place, the re-connection and re-establishment of points and appropriate junction signalling, repair to crossings, lights, bells and station platforms will allow the resumption of services.
