= Ulupna =

- Town
- Coordinates: 35°50′04″S 145°27′32″E
- Country: Australia
- State: Victoria
- Region: Hume
- LGA: Shire of Moira

Government
  - State electorate: Shepparton
  - Federal division: Nicholls

Population
  - Total: 23 (2016 census)
- Postcode: 3641
Localities around Ulupna
New South Wales	New South Wales	New South Wales
New South Wales	Ulupna	Mywee
Strathmerton	Strathmerton	Mywee

Ulupna is a locality in the north of the Australian state of Victoria. The locality is basically Ulupna Island, an inland island bordered by Ulupna Creek and the Murray River. The island is a popular camping destination. In 2016 the Population was 23.

The Ulupna post office opened on 10 February 1879, closed on 11 April 1892, reopened on 1896 and closed on 1 July 1926. A school was opened in 1884 and closed in 1953
