= Yarroweyah =

- Town
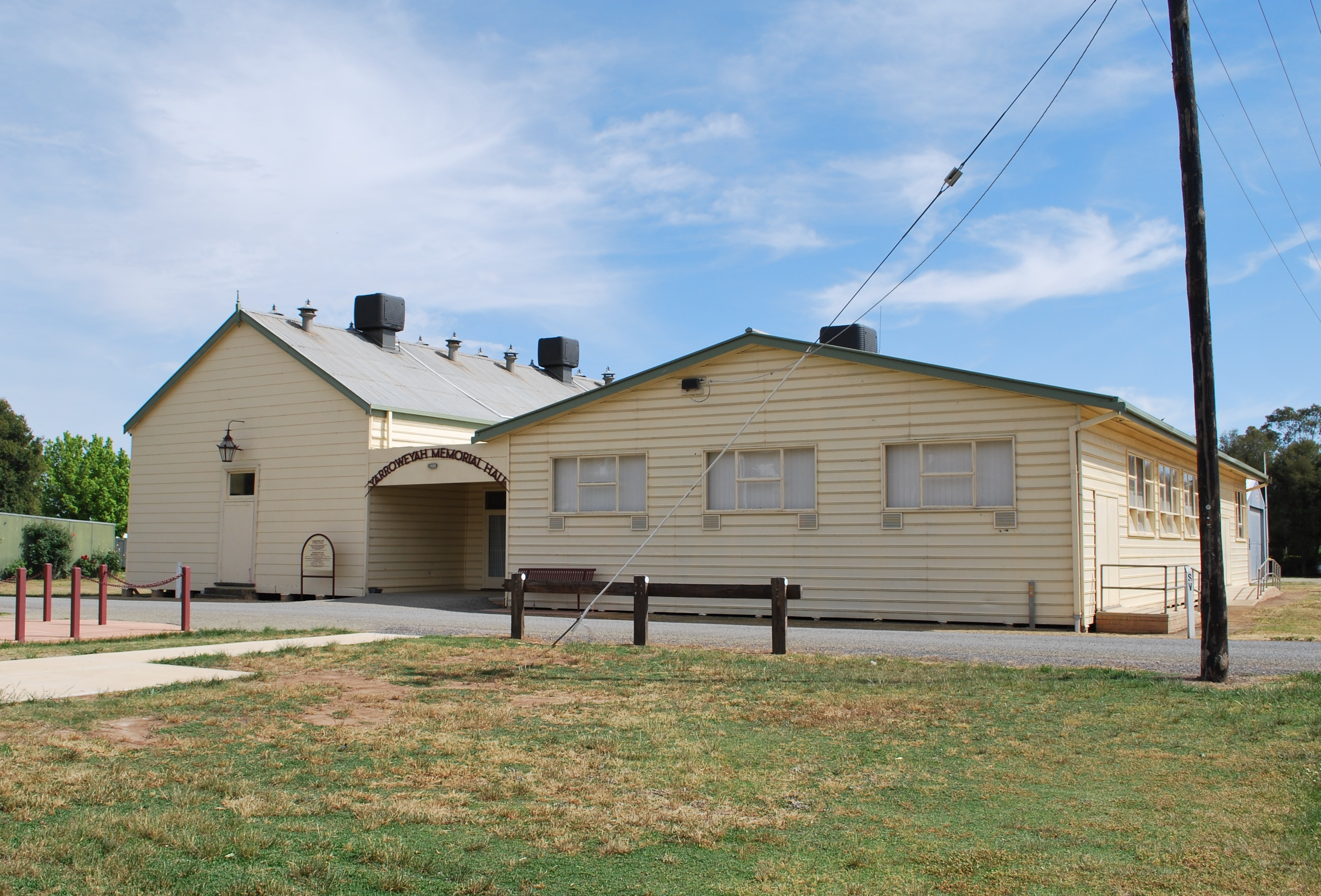
- Yarroweyah Soldier Settlers Monument

- Interactive map of Yarroweyah
- Coordinates: 35°55′30.8″S 145°33′38.3″E
- Country: Australia
- State: Victoria
- Region: Hume
- LGA: Shire of Moira
- Location: 251 km (156 mi) N of Melbourne; 61 km (38 mi) N of Shepparton; 10 km (6.2 mi) W of Cobram

Government
  - State electorate: Ovens Valley
  - Federal division: Nicholls
- Elevation: 113 m (371 ft)

Population
  - Total: 528 (2011 census)
- Postcode: 3644
Localities around Yarroweyah
Strathmerton	Koonoomoo	Cobram
Strathmerton	Yarroweyah	Cobram
Katunga	Katunga	Muckatah

Yarroweyah (/ˈjærəwiːə/ YARR-ə-wee-ə) is a town in northern Victoria, Australia. The town is located in the Shire of Moira local government area, 251 kilometres (156 mi) north of the state capital, Melbourne and 10 kilometres (6 mi) west of Cobram. The town is situated near the intersection of Kenny Road, Kokoda Road and the Murray Valley Highway. At the 2021 census, Yarroweyah and the surrounding area had a population of 551.

== History ==
Yarroweyah Post Office opened on 1 January 1882. In 1888 it was renamed Yarroweyah South when a new Yarroweyah post office opened to the north. This latter office closed in 1976.

After World War II, an extensive soldier settlement area was established to the south of Yarroweyah. The north–south roads built in the area were named after theatres of war, and the east–west roads after generals etc. (e.g. Tobruk, Labuan, Macarthur).

For over a century, area residents drilled individual wells to supply their water needs. In 2003, it was proposed to create a municipal distribution system; the residents approved the proposal, and work began. Based on a Cobram to Strathmerton pipeline, the system began providing culinary water in 2005.

The Yarroweyah Football Netball Club, nicknamed "The Hoppers", competed in the Picola & District Football Netball League, and were based in the town until folding at the end of 2024 due to lack of players.
