= Tocumwal =

- Town
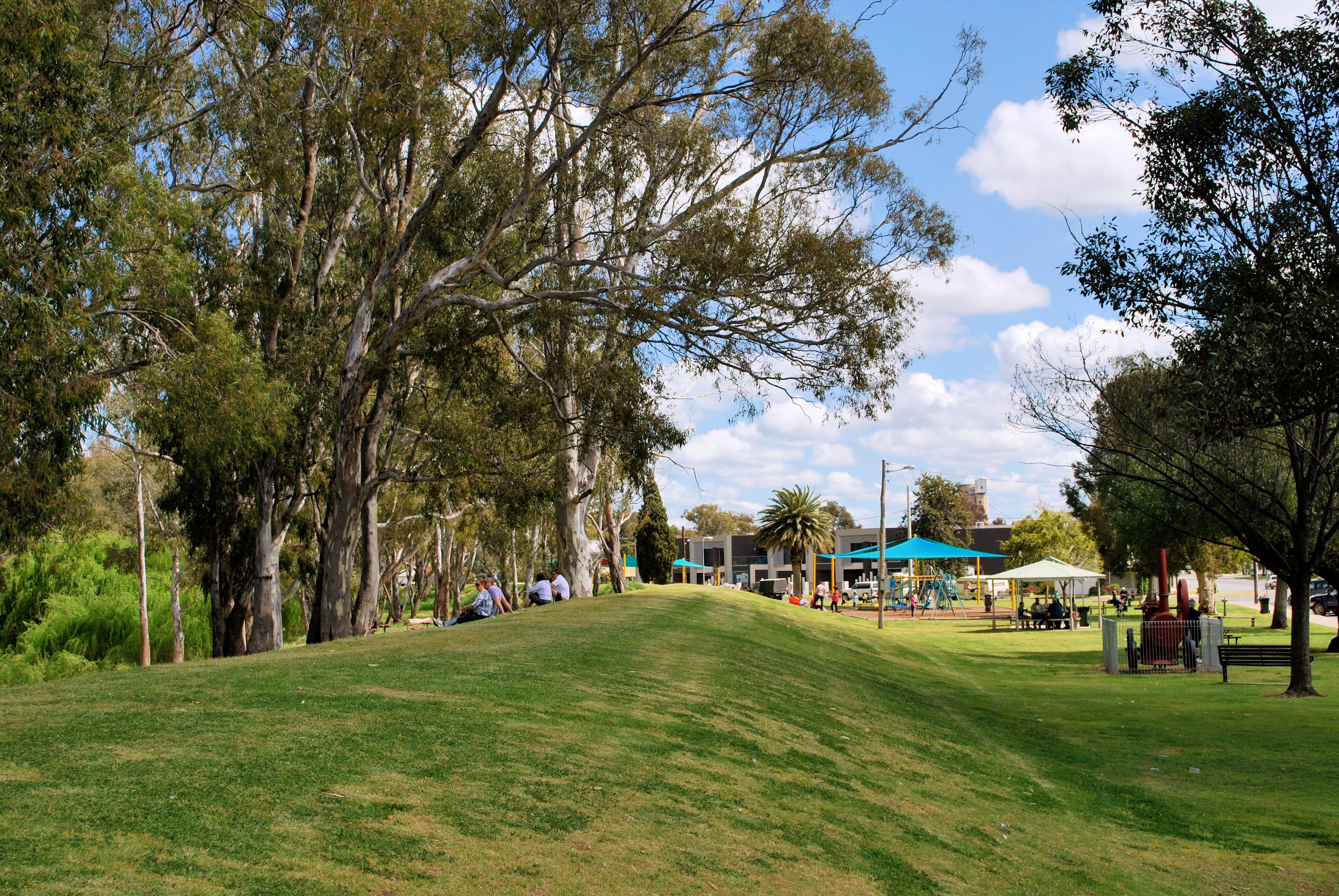
- The levee and foreshore park at Tocumwal

- Coordinates: 35°48′54″S 145°34′05″E
- Country: Australia
- State: New South Wales
- LGA: Berrigan Shire
- Location: 270 km (170 mi) from Melbourne

Government
  - State electorate: Murray
  - Federal division: Farrer
- Elevation: 126 m (413 ft)

Population
  - Total: 2,862 (2021 census)
  - Density: 5,000/km^{2} (13,000/sq mi)
- Postcode: 2714
- County: Denison
- Mean max temp: 22.9 °C (73.2 °F)
- Mean min temp: 9.6 °C (49.3 °F)
- Annual rainfall: 448.6 mm (17.66 in)

Tocumwal (/ˈtoʊkəmwɔːl/ TOH-kəm-wawl) is a town in the southern Riverina region of New South Wales, Australia, in the Berrigan Shire local government area. The town, 270 kilometres (170 mi) north of the city of Melbourne, lies on the northern bank of the Murray River, which forms the border with Victoria.

The Newell Highway and Murray Valley Highway join at the Murray River, and form part of the main road route National Highway between Brisbane and Melbourne. At the 2021 census, Tocumwal had a population of 2,862.

The name of the town is probably a corruption of the local Pangerang indigenous word, "Tucumiva" (or "Tucumival"), meaning "deep hole". Near Tocumwal is a 25-metre-deep hole in granite rock, now known as "The Blowhole", which is linked underground to the nearby Murray River.

== History ==
Prior to European settlement, the Tocumwal area was inhabited by the Ulupna and Bangerang people. The first pastoral runs were established in the 1840s. The town was established in the early 1860s and gazetted in 1862 as:

"a Village to be called TOCUMWAL ... Situated on the Murray River, on the road from Albury to Deniliquin, about 50 miles west of Corowa, and 40 south-east of Deniliquin."

Tocumwal Post Office opened on 1 August 1868.

Prior to Federation, Tocumwal was an important customs point for goods moving between the then British colonies of Victoria and New South Wales.

A standard gauge branch line, from the New South Wales Government Railways (NSWGR) Main Southern railway line at Junee, reached Narrandera in 1881 and a branch from Narrandera was completed to Tocumwal in 1898. The broad gauge Victorian Railways Melbourne-Shepparton railway line was extended to Tocumwal in 1908, creating a break-of-gauge location at Tocumwal, but the NSWGR line from Finley to Tocumwal was closed in 1987.

During World War II the town was the site of Royal Australian Air Force Station Tocumwal, which was a major Royal Australian Air Force training airfield and aircraft depot. Units included (at various times) the 5 Operational Training Unit, 7 Operational Training Unit, 7 Aircraft Depot and the Paratroop Training Unit. Today, the airfield is a renowned gliding site.

Also during the War, Tocumwal was the location of RAAF No.14 Inland Aircraft Fuel Depot (IAFD), completed in 1942 and closed on 14 June 1944. Usually consisting of four tanks, 31 fuel depots were built across Australia for the storage and supply of aircraft fuel for the RAAF and the US Army Air Forces at a total cost of £900,000 ($1,800,000).

After the War ended, families were housed at the American Air Force Hospital and the men travelled daily over the river to Yarroweyah, in Victoria, to work on farms, which they could then apply for under the soldier settlement scheme. The hospital was on or next to Barooga Station. Living quarters were in long Nissen huts, with three or four families in each and a shared bathroom. Single quarters were at the front and a cook was employed.

Also after the War, about 200 Air Force houses in Tocumwal were disassembled and trucked to Canberra to be reused in as government housing for workers from Melbourne and Sydney who were constructing the new capital city. Called Tocumwal houses, they remain a distinctive architectural feature in Canberra's suburbs, such as O'Connor and Ainslie.

== Heritage listings ==
Tocumwal has a number of heritage-listed sites, including:

- Narrandera-Tocumwal railway: Tocumwal railway station
- Narrandera-Tocumwal railway: Tocumwal Road and Rail Bridge over Murray River

== Climate ==
Tocumwal has a semi-arid climate (Köppen BSk). marginally too dry to be classified as a humid subtropical climate (Cfa), with hot summers and pleasant winters. Rainfall is moderate but somewhat erratic, with calendar year totals having ranged from 191.1 millimetres or 7.52 inches in 1982 to 873.8 millimetres or 34.40 inches in 1973.

Climate data for Tocumwal
Month	Jan	Feb	Mar	Apr	May	Jun	Jul	Aug	Sep	Oct	Nov	Dec	Year
Record high °C (°F)	46.5 (115.7)	45.7 (114.3)	41.8 (107.2)	37.8 (100.0)	29.0 (84.2)	23.7 (74.7)	25.5 (77.9)	30.5 (86.9)	35.2 (95.4)	37.0 (98.6)	43.5 (110.3)	44.9 (112.8)	46.5 (115.7)
Mean daily maximum °C (°F)	32.0 (89.6)	31.5 (88.7)	28.1 (82.6)	23.1 (73.6)	18.3 (64.9)	14.7 (58.5)	13.9 (57.0)	15.7 (60.3)	18.9 (66.0)	22.8 (73.0)	26.9 (80.4)	29.7 (85.5)	23.0 (73.4)
Mean daily minimum °C (°F)	16.2 (61.2)	16.1 (61.0)	13.6 (56.5)	9.7 (49.5)	6.7 (44.1)	4.3 (39.7)	3.4 (38.1)	4.2 (39.6)	6.2 (43.2)	8.8 (47.8)	11.9 (53.4)	14.1 (57.4)	9.6 (49.3)
Record low °C (°F)	7.4 (45.3)	6.8 (44.2)	5.0 (41.0)	0.0 (32.0)	−2.1 (28.2)	−4.8 (23.4)	−4.3 (24.3)	−4 (25)	−1.5 (29.3)	−1.5 (29.3)	0.2 (32.4)	5.1 (41.2)	−4.8 (23.4)
Average rainfall mm (inches)	33.4 (1.31)	28.9 (1.14)	35.2 (1.39)	32.2 (1.27)	40.5 (1.59)	44.0 (1.73)	41.9 (1.65)	42.7 (1.68)	39.0 (1.54)	42.4 (1.67)	34.9 (1.37)	34.1 (1.34)	449.0 (17.68)
Average rainy days (≥ 1 mm)	2.8	2.4	3.1	3.4	4.7	5.6	6.3	6.2	5.4	4.8	4.0	3.1	51.8
Average relative humidity (%)	33	35	38	46	57	65	65	57	52	45	38	33	47

== Facilities ==
Tocumwal has one state and one Catholic primary school. The nearest high school is in Finley, 21 kilometres (13 mi) to the north.

Australian rules football, cricket and netball are all very popular in the town. Notable sporting teams include the Tocumwal Football Club (The Bloods) who compete in the Picola & District Football League

Tocumwal is in the federal Division of Farrer and the state Electoral district of Murray.

Tocumwal was also where the largest Murray cod in the world was caught.

Tocumwal has a 36-hole championship golf course at the Tocumwal Golf Club, a bowls club and is well known internationally for gliding at SportAviation.

== Gallery ==
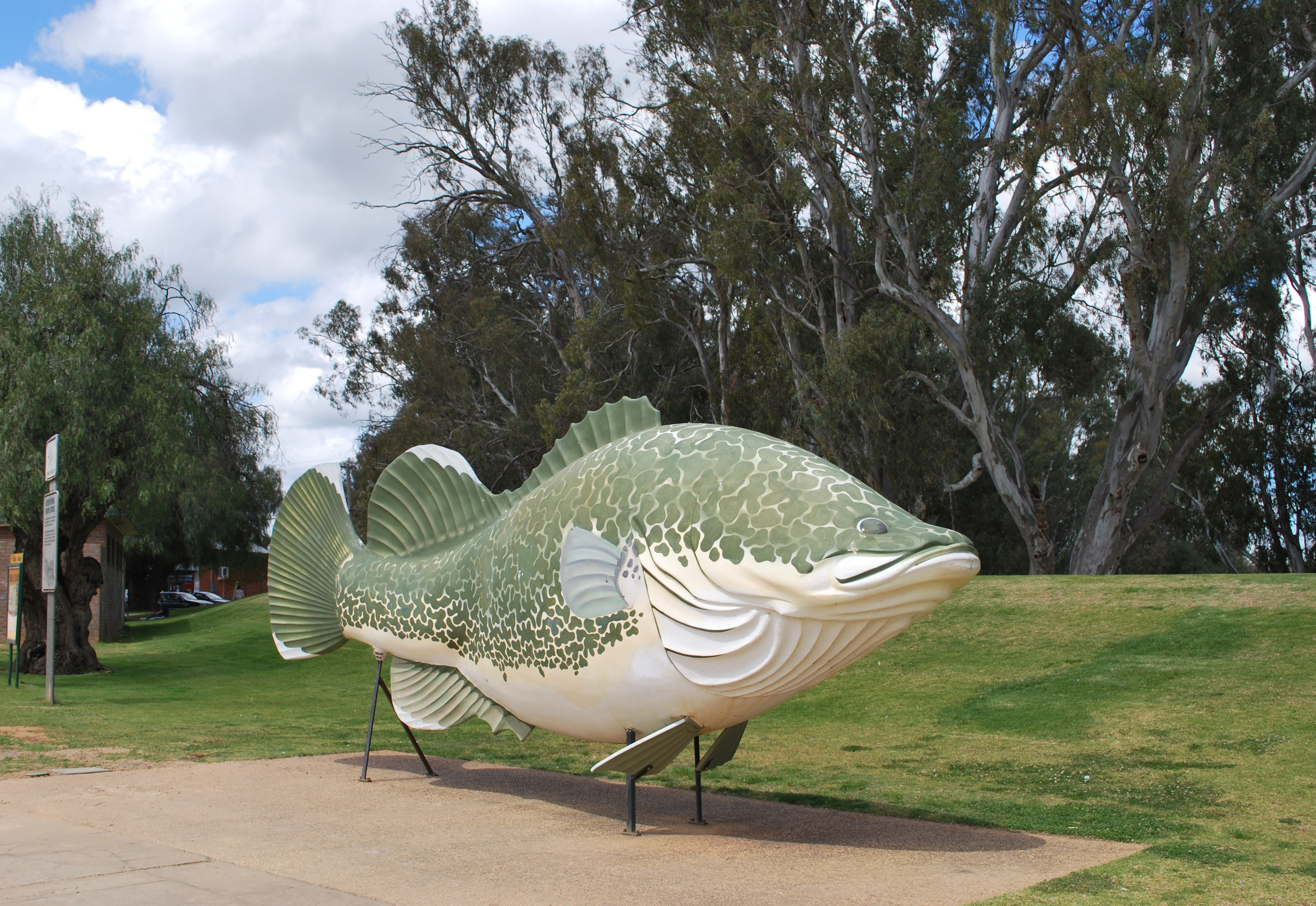
The Big Murray Cod on the Tocumwal foreshore

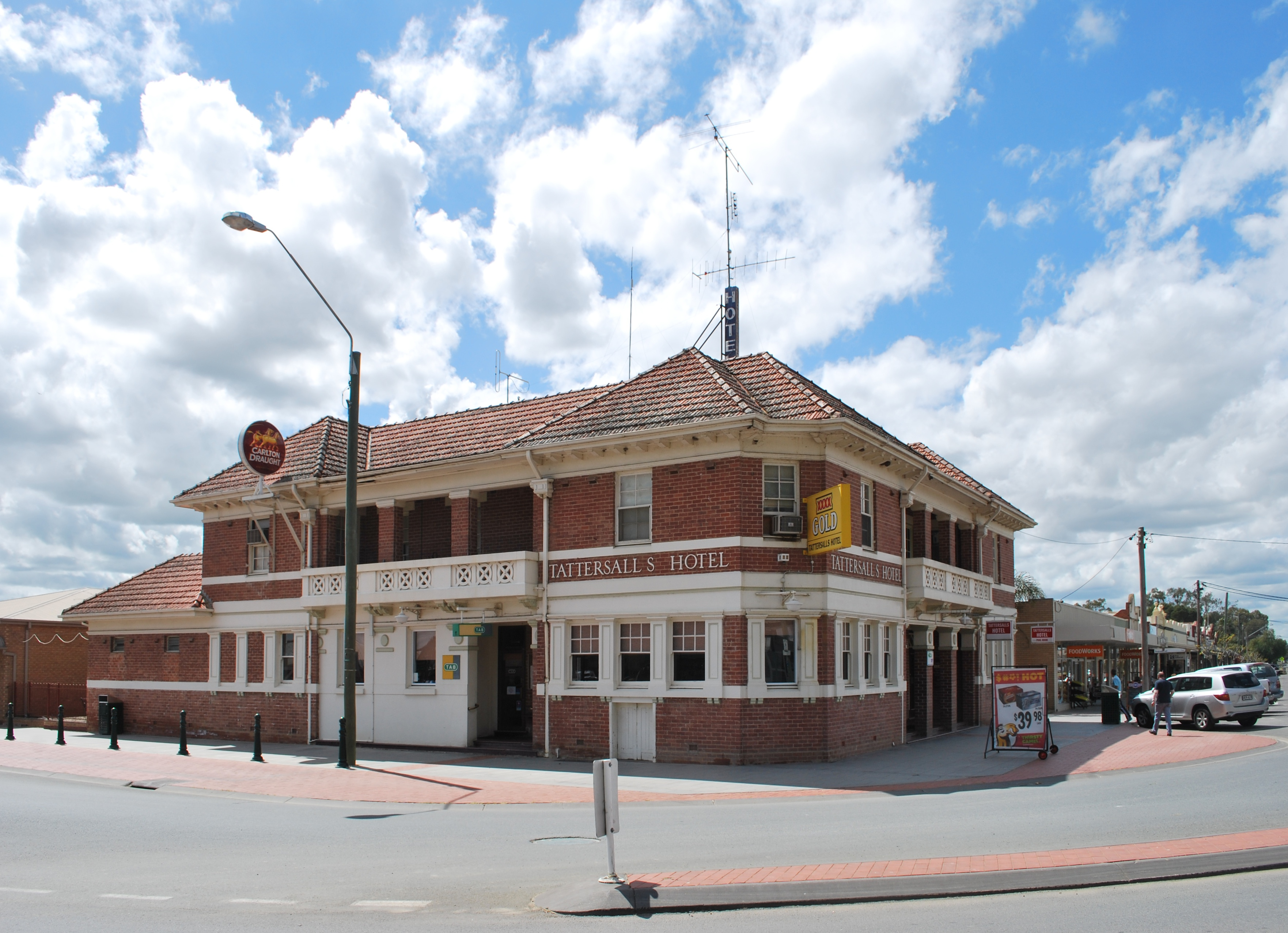
The Tattersalls Hotel, one of four pubs in Tocumwal

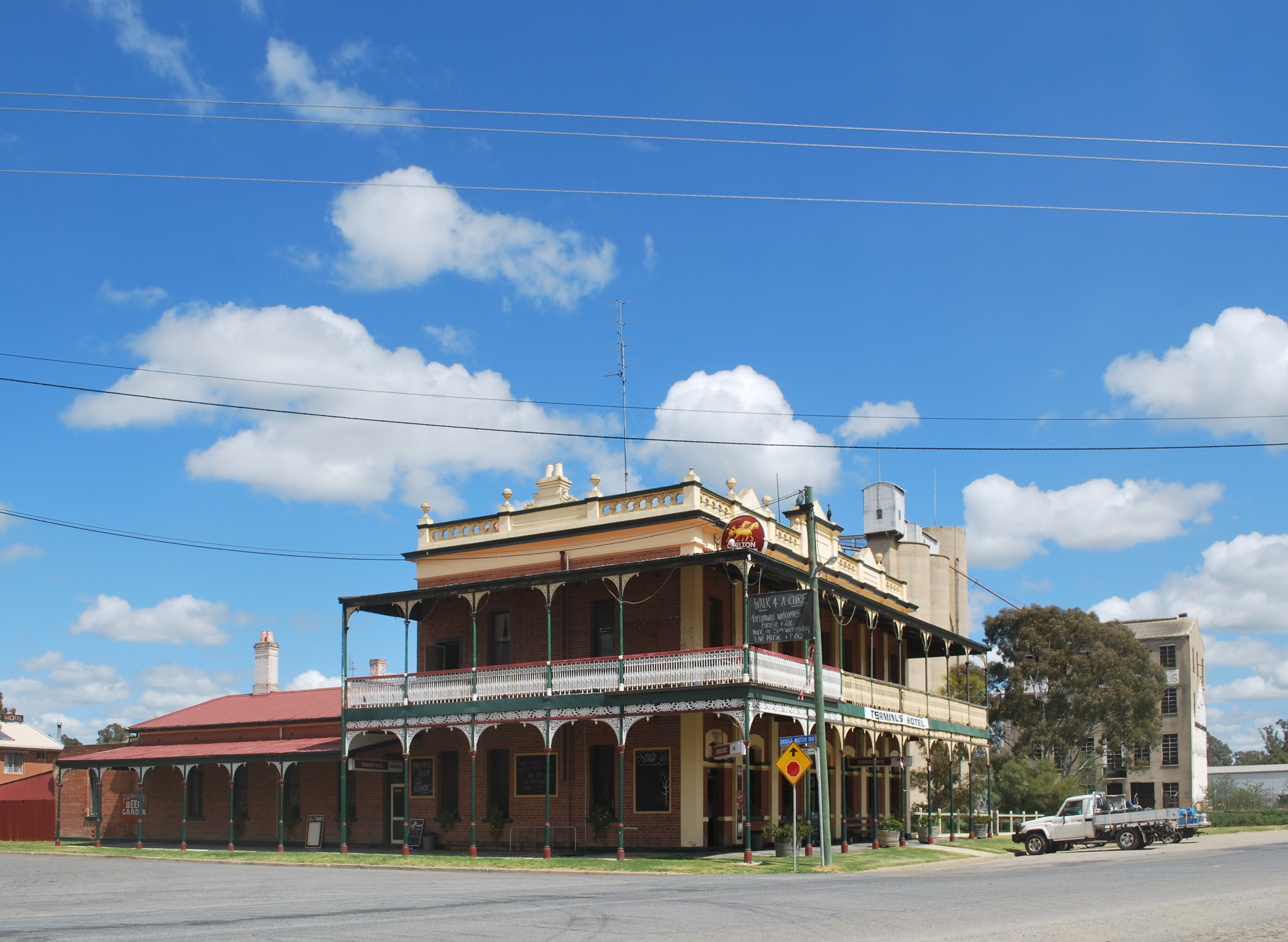
The Terminus Hotel, another of the four pubs

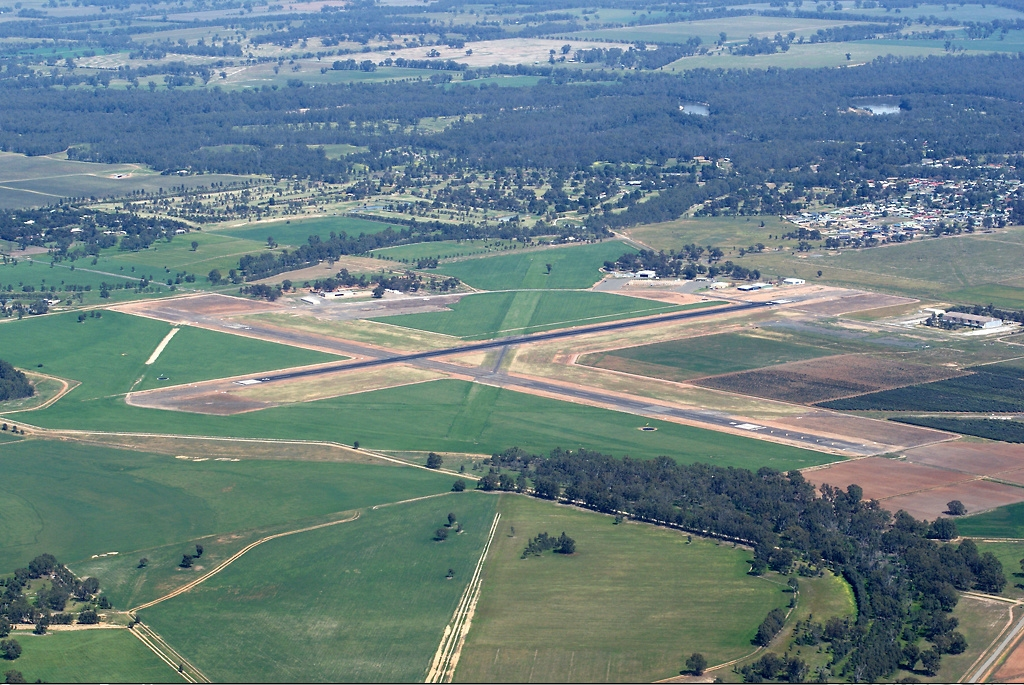
Tocumwal Airport
