= Shire of Swan Hill =

Coordinates: 35°22′S 143°33′E

- Local government area
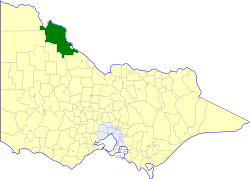
- Location in Victoria

- The Shire of Swan Hill as at its dissolution in 1995
- Country: Australia
- State: Victoria
- Region: Mallee
- Established: 1893
- Council seat: Swan Hill

Area
  - Total: 6,550 km^{2} (2,530 sq mi)

Population
  - Total: 12,070 (1992)
  - Density: 1.8427/km^{2} (4.773/sq mi)
- County: Tatchera, Karkarooc
LGAs around Shire of Swan Hill
Mildura	Balranald (NSW)	Balranald (NSW)
Walpeup	Shire of Swan Hill	Murray River Council (NSW)
Wycheproof	Wycheproof	Kerang

The Shire of Swan Hill was a local government area in north-western Victoria, Australia, along the Murray River. The shire covered an area of 6,550 square kilometres (2,529.0 sq mi), and existed from 1893 until 1995. From 1939 onwards, Swan Hill itself was managed by a separate entity; the City of Swan Hill. After a large-scale statewide amalgamation program by the Victorian Government in 1994–1995, they were reunited under the Rural City of Swan Hill.

== History ==
The Swan Hill Road District, which initially covered most of north-western Victoria, was incorporated on 8 July 1862, and became a shire on 14 August 1871. The Shire of Gordon was severed and incorporated on 26 May 1885, from parts of the East and West Loddon Ridings. The Shire of Mildura followed suit on 10 January 1890, severed from the Lower Murray Riding.

On 30 May 1893, the Shire of Castle Donnington was severed and proclaimed by the Governor of Victoria, from what remained of the West Loddon, East Loddon and Lower Murray Ridings. The remainder of the shire was renamed the Shire of Kerang on 31 December 1898. On 31 May 1904, Castle Donnington was renamed and gazetted as the Shire of Swan Hill.

A new shire, Walpeup, was formed in western Victoria on 1 October 1911, taking in some western areas of Swan Hill and sections of five other shires. A small part of the shire in and near the town of Swan Hill was severed on 31 May 1939, and was incorporated as a borough, which became a city on 2 April 1964.

On 20 January 1995, the Shire of Swan Hill was abolished, and along with the City of Swan Hill and the Tresco district of the Shire of Kerang, was merged into the newly created Rural City of Swan Hill.

== Wards ==
The Shire of Swan Hill was divided into three ridings, each of which elected three councillors:

- North Riding
- South Riding
- Central Riding

== Towns and localities ==
- Annuello
- Bannerton
- Beverford
- Bolton
- Chillingollah
- Boundary Bend
- Goschen
- Kooloonong
- Lake Boga
- Manangatang
- Margooya
- Narrung
- Nyah
- Nyah West
- Piangil
- Robinvale
- Ultima
- Vinifera
- Waitchie
- Wemen
- Winnambool
- Wood Wood
- Woorinen
- Woorinen South

== Population ==
Year	Population
1954	11,147
1958	11,740*
1961	12,785
1966	12,941
1971	12,366
1976	12,270
1981	12,395
1986	11,986
1991	11,433

* Estimate in the 1958 Victorian Year Book.
