= Beverford =

Beverford Victoria
- Coordinates: 35°14′16″S 143°28′54″E
- Postcode(s): 3590
- Location: 350 km (217 mi) from Melbourne; 14 km (9 mi) from Swan Hill; 8 km (5 mi) from Vinifera; 5 km (3 mi) from Tyntynder South
- LGA(s): Rural City of Swan Hill
- State electorate(s): Murray Plains
- Federal division(s): Mallee
Localities around Beverford:
New South Wales	New South Wales	Speewa
Vinifera	Beverford	Tyntynder
Woorinen North	Woorinen	Tyntynder South

Beverford is a locality situated in the Sunraysia region. It is situated about 5 kilometres north west from Tyntynder South and 8 kilometres south east from Vinifera. At the 2021 census, Beverford had a population of 337.

Beverford Post Office opened on 23 July 1923.
