= List of places of worship in the Rural City of Swan Hill =

This is a list of places of worship in the Rural City of Swan Hill, a local government area in the state of Victoria, Australia. The list includes active and former churches and other religious buildings representing a variety of Christian denominations and other faiths.

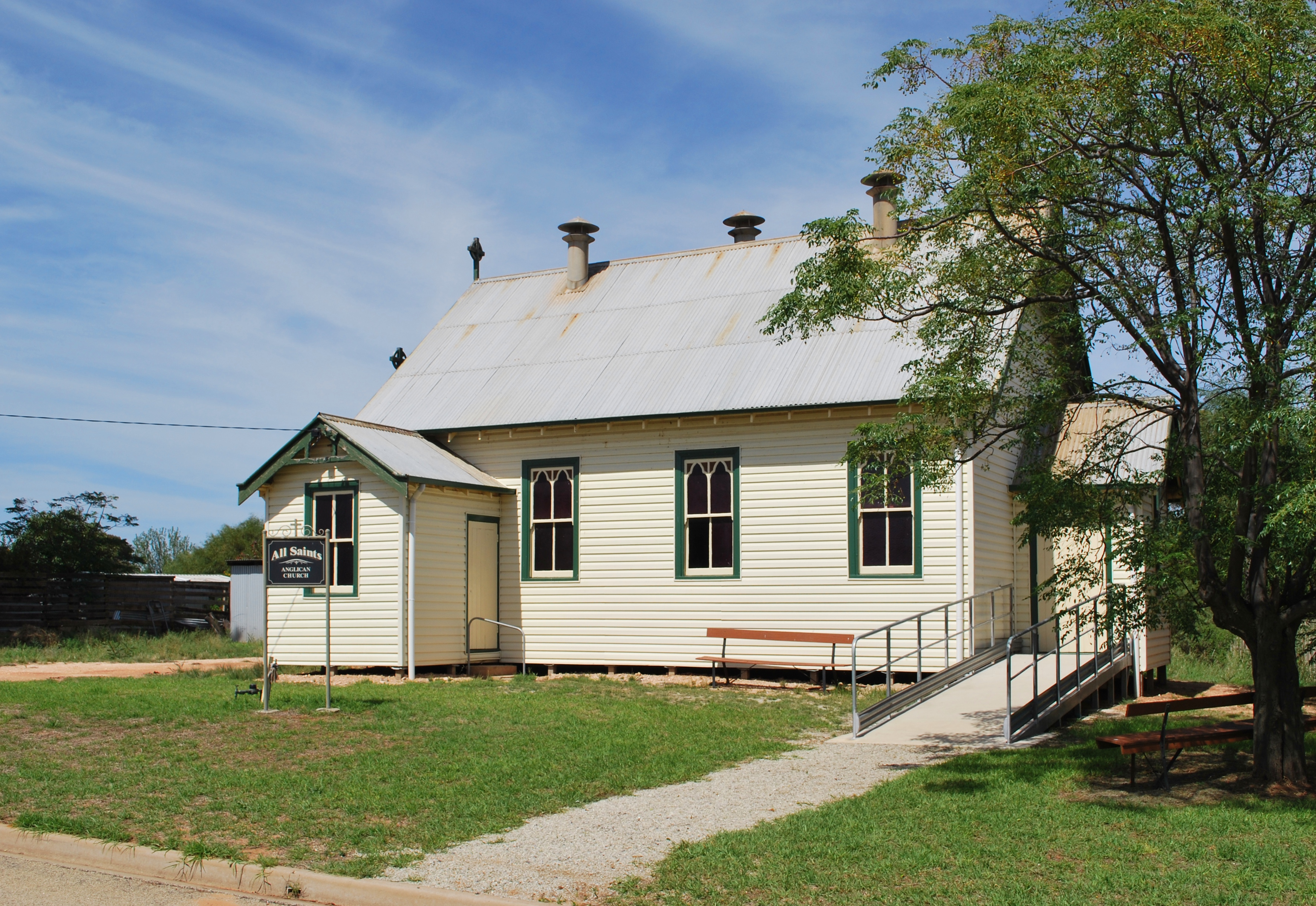
All Saints' Anglican Church, Nyah West

== Heritage listing status ==
Style	Status
Yes	Listed on the Victorian Heritage Register
–	Not listed

== Current places of worship ==
Current places of worship
Name	Image	Location	Denomination/ Affiliation	Heritage listing	Notes	Refs
Robinvale Church of Christ		Robinvale; 34.586618°S 142.776935°E	Church of Christ	–		
St George Greek Orthodox Chuch		Robinvale; 34.589638°S 142.774935°E	Greek Orthodox	–		
St Peter's Anglican Church		Robinvale; 34.589633°S 142.772278°E	Anglican	–		
St Luke's Uniting Church		Robinvale; 34.588800°S 142.774605°E	Uniting	–		
Robinvale Tongan Wesleyan Methodist Church		Robinvale; 34.584474°S 142.774805°E	Methodist (Wesleyan)	–		
St Mary's Catholic Church		Robinvale; 34.585032°S 142.778048°E	Catholic	–		
Robinvale Seventh-day Adventist Church		Robinvale; 34.586203°S 142.772339°E	Seventh-day Adventist	–		
Swan Hill Baptist Church		Swan Hill; 35.341304°S 143.548556°E	Baptist	–		
Swan Hill Corps		Swan Hill; 35.341688°S 143.558454°E	Salvation Army	–		
St Mary's Catholic Church, Swan Hill		Swan Hill; 35.343136°S 143.557279°E	Catholic	–		
Swan Hill Uniting Church		Swan Hill; 35.343371°S 143.558945°E	Uniting	–		
Swan Hill Presbyterian Church		Swan Hill; 35.343352°S 143.561089°E	Presbyterian	Yes		
Swan Hill Church of Christ (The Grain Shed Church of Christ)		Swan Hill; 35.328286°S 143.555798°E	Church of Christ	–		
Swan Hill Christian Centre		Swan Hill; 35.364218°S 143.561199°E	Pentecostal (CRC Churches)	–		
St Paul's Lutheran Church		Swan Hill; 35.347886°S 143.562301°E	Lutheran	–		
Swan Hill Seventh-day Adventist Church		Swan Hill; 35.351779°S 143.561701°E	Seventh-day Adventist	–		
Christ Church, Swan Hill		Swan Hill; 35.339705°S 143.556375°E	Anglican	–		
Swan Hill Mussola		Swan Hill; 35.343703°S 143.558941°E	Islam	–		
Swan Hill Gurudwara Sahib		Swan Hill; 35.337416°S 143.551265°E	Sikh	–		
Manangatang Uniting Church		Manangatang; 35.052078°S 142.879339°E	Uniting (formerly Presbyterian)	–		
St Patrick's Catholic Church		Manangatang; 35.051500°S 142.880786°E	Catholic	–		
Lake Boga Uniting Church		Lake Boga; 35.461638°S 143.628409°E	Uniting	–		
All Saint's Anglican Church		Nyah West; 35.185825°S 143.349429°E	Anglican	–		
Nyah West Uniting Church		Nyah West; 35.186744°S 143.343861°E	Uniting	–		

== Former places of worship ==
Former places of worship
Name	Image	Location	Denomination/ Affiliation	Heritage listing	Notes	Refs
St Andrew's Anglican Church		Manangatang; 35.050579°S 142.880889°E	Anglican	–		
Chinkapook Uniting Church		Chinkapook; 35.189622°S 142.945454°E	Uniting (formerly Methodist & Presbyterian)	–		
St Brigid's Catholic Church (site)		Chinkapook; 35.189268°S 142.944245°E	Catholic	Non-existant	Relocated to Irymple	
Waitchie Uniting Church		Waitchie; 35.362862°S 143.102174°E	Uniting (formerly Presbyterian)	–		
Ultima Presbyterian Church		Ultima; 35.473704°S 143.264822°E	Presbyterian	–		
Ultima Methodist Church (site)		Ultima; 35.473978°S 143.266823°E	Methodist	Non-existant	Relocated to Wood Wood	
Holy Trinity Anglican Church		Ultima; 35.475159°S 143.267052°E	Anglican	–		
St Joseph's Catholic Church, Ultima		Ultima; 35.469259°S 143.265250°E	Catholic	–		
Lake Boga Presbyterian Church		Lake Boga; 35.459146°S 143.628440°E	Presbyterian	–		
St Joseph's Catholic Church, Lake Boga (site)		Lake Boga; 35.460911°S 143.629628°E	Catholic	Non-existant		
Holy Innocent's Anglican Church		Woorinen; 35.269031°S 143.466163°E	Anglican	Non-existant	Relocated to Mildura	
St Joseph's Catholic Church, Nyah West		Nyah West; 35.185824°S 143.353996°E	Catholic	–		
Wood Wood Methodist Church		Wood Wood; 35.106161°S 143.347202°E	Methodist	–		
Piangil Uniting Church		Piangil; 35.054733°S 143.314342°E	Uniting (formerly United (Methodist & Presbyterian))	–		
St Patrick's Catholic Church, Piangil		Piangil; 35.051386°S 143.311986°E	Catholic	–		

== See also ==
- List of places of worship in West Wimmera Shire
- List of places of worship in Golden Plains Shire
- List of places of worship in the City of Greater Geelong
- List of places of worship in Northern Grampians Shire
