= List of places on the Victorian Heritage Register in the Rural City of Swan Hill =

This is a list of places on the Victorian Heritage Register in the Rural City of Swan Hill in Victoria, Australia. The Victorian Heritage Register is maintained by the Heritage Council of Victoria.

The Victorian Heritage Register, as of 2021, lists the following six state-registered places within the Rural City of Swan Hill:

Place name	Place #	Location	Suburb or Town	Co-ordinates	Built	State registered	Photo
Lake Boga Flying Boat Museum	H2208	Willakool Drive	Lake Boga	35.450880°S 143.627501°E	1942	14 May 2009	
Manangatang railway station	H1576	70 Wattle Street	Manangatang	35.051860°S 142.883830°E	1916	20 August 1982	
PS Gem	H1742	Pioneer Settlement, Monash Drive	Swan Hill	35.348700°S 143.564620°E	1876	20 August 1998	
Swan Hill Bridge	H0794	Deniliquin Road over the Murray River	Swan Hill	35.337742°S 143.562809°E	1896	10 July 2008	
Tooleybuc Bridge	H0765	Tooleybuc Road over the Murray River	Piangil	35.030490°S 143.335258°E	1925	10 July 2008	
Tyntyndyer (Tyntynder) Homestead	H2353	70 Tyntynder Homestead Road	Beverford	35.217710°S 143.463710°E	1846	14 April 2016	
