= Pier Milan =

- Town
- Coordinates: 35°14′58″S 142°41′29″E
- Country: Australia
- State: Victoria
- LGA: Shire of Buloke
- Location: 353 km (219 mi) NW of Melbourne; 84 km (52 mi) W of Swan Hill; 35 km (22 mi) SW of Sea Lake

Government
  - State electorate: Mildura
  - Federal division: Mallee

Population
  - Total: 6 (SAL 2021)
- Postcode: 3533
Localities around Pier Milan
Mittyack	Mittyack	Gerahmin
Tempy	Pier Milan	Gerahmin
Tempy	Nandaly	Lake Tyrrell, Bimbourie

Pier Milan is a town in Victoria, Australia. There is a station on the Kulwin railway line. The post office opened as Pier-Millan on 9 May 1911; it was renamed Pier Millan in 1940, and was closed on 30 September 1971.
