= Bimbourie =

- Town
- Coordinates: 35°21′0″S 142°46′0″E
- Country: Australia
- State: Victoria
- LGA: Shire of Buloke
- Location: 370 km (230 mi) from Melbourne; 92 km (57 mi) from Swan Hill; 21 km (13 mi) from Pier Milan; 13 km (8.1 mi) from Nandaly

Population
  - Total: 9 (2016 census)
- Postcode: 3533
Localities around Bimbourie
Pier Milan	Pier Milan	Lake Tyrrell
Nandaly	Bimbourie	Lake Tyrrell
Nyarrin	Ninda	Ninda

Bimbourie is a locality situated in the Mallee region in Victoria, Australia. The place by road, is situated about 13 kilometres from Nandaly and 22 kilometres from Sea Lake, Victoria.

The place name Bimbourie is thought to be derived from an Aboriginal word Bimbogrie meaning "well dug by Aboriginal people".

Bimbourie Post Office opened on 9 June 1911 and closed in 1914.
