= Gerahmin =

Gerahmin Victoria
- Coordinates: 35°11′S 142°48′E
- Population: 21 (2016 census)
- Postcode(s): 3546
- Location: 399 km (248 mi) from Melbourne; 80 km (50 mi) from Swan Hill; 53 km (33 mi) from Ouyen; 157 km (98 mi) from Mildura
- LGA(s): Rural City of Swan Hill
Localities around Gerahmin:
Manangatang	Manangatang	Cocamba
Mittyack	Gerahmin	Chinkapook
Pier Milan	Lake Tyrrell	Tyrrell Downs

Gerahmin is a locality in Victoria, Australia, located approximately 80 km from Swan Hill, Victoria.
