= Cannie =

- Suburb
- Interactive map of Cannie
- Country: Australia
- State: New South Wales
- LGA: Gannawarra Shire

Area
  - Total: 120 km^{2} (46 sq mi)

Population
  - Totals: 16 (2021); 22 (2016)
  - Density: 0.133/km^{2} (0.345/sq mi)
- Time zone: Australian Eastern Standard Time
- Postcode: 3540
Suburbs around Cannie
Lalbert	Lalbert	Beauchamp
Tittybong	Cannie	Sandhill Lake
Tittybong	Quambatook	Budgerum East

Cannie is a locality in the northwest of Victoria, Australia, within the Shire of Gannawarra. The closest large settlement is Swan Hill. In the 2021 census, Cannie had a population of 16. The locality has an approximate area of 120 square kilometers.

== Cannie Wind Farm ==
Development proposals for a wind farm in Cannie has been proposed by the RES group, and construction is expected to start in 2029. The wind farm is expected to cover 14,000 hectares of land, have 174 wind turbines, and to produce 1300 megawatts of energy. The number of wind turbines to be built was originally 200, but after further mapping this was lowered to 174.
