= Nandaly =

- Town
- Coordinates: 35°18′0″S 142°42′0″E
- Country: Australia
- State: Victoria
- LGA(s): Shire of Buloke
- Location: 388 km (241 mi) NW of Melbourne; 159 km (99 mi) SE of Mildura; 108 km (67 mi) W of Swan Hill; 34 km (21 mi) N of Sea Lake

Government
  - State electorate(s): Mildura
  - Federal division(s): Mallee

Population
  - Total(s): 30 (2021 census)
- Postcode: 3533
Localities around Nandaly
Tempy	Pier Milan	Pier Milan
Tyenna	Nandaly	Bimbourie
Straten	Nyarrin	Bimbourie

Nandaly is a town in the Mallee region of Victoria, Australia. The town is located 388 kilometres (241 mi) north-west of the state capital, Melbourne on the Calder Highway in the Shire of Buloke local government area. At the 2021 census, Nandaly had a population of 30.

== History ==
The Post Office opened on 2 November 1914 when a community developed on the arrival of the railway. It later closed, along with the town's General Store. The Public School has also closed since the turn of the century. Much of the downturn follows the diversion of traffic around Nandaly following the highway being re-routed, A-road to B-road type of change.

Nandaly Hotel's owner died however the community banded together, forming a co-operative by membership to purchase the pub and license, donating labour to rehabilitate the venue and re-open it in 2022. Membership, when it was available during fundraising, was available from $250 upwards, with some local farmers donating $5,000 to $10,000.

The town received grant funding from the LGA enabling them to install 2 powered and watered caravan/camping sites, along with disabled toilet/shower amenities in early 2022.

With its neighbouring township Sea Lake, Nandaly has a football team (Sea Lake-Nandaly) competing in the North Central Football League.

Golfers play at the course of the Nandaly Golf Club on Messinnes Street.
