= Straten =

- Town
- Coordinates: 35°22′20″S 142°34′23″E
- Country: Australia
- State: Victoria
- LGA: Shire of Buloke

Government
  - State electorate: Mildura
  - Federal division: Mallee

Population
  - Total: 11 (SAL 2021)
- Postcode: 3533
Localities around Straten
| Tempy | Tyenna | Nandaly |
| Tempy | Straten | Nyarrin |
| Speed | Turriff East | Nyarrin |

Straten is a locality in the Shire of Buloke, Victoria that was also previously called Stratton.

Speed East post office was opened on 15 January 1923, renamed Stratton on 15 April 1924 and was closed on 12 July 1952.
