= Tyenna =

Tyenna may refer to:

- Tyenna, Tasmania, Australia
- Tyenna, Victoria, Australia
