= Lake Tyrrell, Victoria =

Lake Tyrrell
- Town
- Coordinates: 35°19′0″S 142°47′0″E
- Country: Australia
- State: Victoria
- LGA: Shire of Buloke
- Location: 382 km (237 mi) northwest of Melbourne; 102 km (63 mi) west of Swan Hill; 95 km (59 mi) south of Robinvale; 166 km (103 mi) southeast of Mildura

Population
  - Total: 0 (2016 census)
- Postcode: 3533
Localities around Lake Tyrrell
Pier Milan	Gerahmin	Chinkapook
Bimbourie	Lake Tyrrell	Tyrrell Downs
Ninda	Sea Lake	Sea Lake

Lake Tyrrell is a locality in Victoria, Australia, located approximately 95 km from Robinvale, Victoria. The locality is named after the nearby Lake Tyrrell.
