= Beauchamp, Victoria =

Beauchamp
- Town
- Coordinates: 35°36′44″S 143°35′54″E
- Country: Australia
- State: Victoria
- LGAs: Shire of Gannawarra; Rural City of Swan Hill

Government
  - State electorate: Murray Plains
  - Federal division: Mallee

Population
  - Total: 44 (Australian Bureau of Statistics (27 June 2,017). "2,016 Community Profiles: {{{name}}}". 2,016 Census of Population and Housing.)
- Postcode: 3579
Localities around Beauchamp
Kunat	Kunat	Tresco West
Lalbert	Beauchamp	Mystic Park
Cannie	Sandhill Lake	Bael Bael

Beauchamp is a locality in Victoria, Australia in the local government area of the Rural City of Swan Hill and the Shire of Gannawarra. The post office opened in 1902 and closed on 31 December 1944.
