= Tempy =

- Town
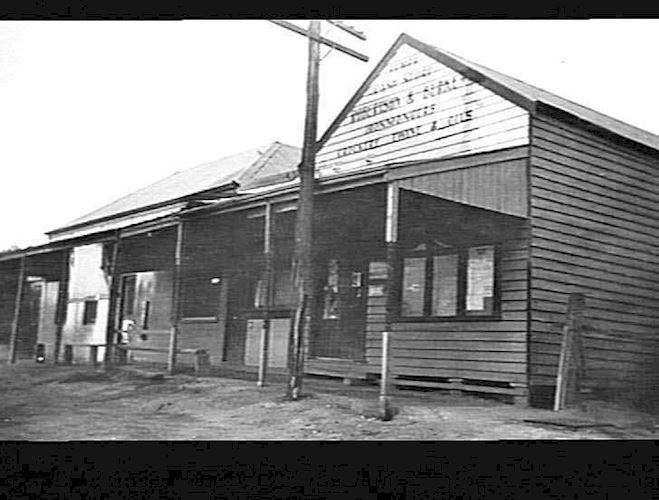
- Front of the H.V. McKay Agency at Tempy, March 1940

- Coordinates: 35°20′40″S 142°25′30″E
- Country: Australia
- State: Victoria
- LGAs: Shire of Yarriambiack; Rural City of Mildura
- Location: 408 km (254 mi) from Melbourne; 136 km (85 mi) from Mildura; 32 km (20 mi) from Ouyen; 267 km (166 mi) from Bendigo

Government
  - State electorate: Mildura
  - Federal division: Mallee

Population
  - Total: 57 (2016 census)
- Postcode: 3489
Localities around Tempy
Ouyen	Ouyen	Mittyack, Pier Milan
Patchewollock	Tempy	Nandaly, Tyenna
Patchewollock	Speed	Straten

Tempy is a locality in Victoria, Australia, located approximately 136 km from Mildura, Victoria and about 30 km south of Ouyen.

The area has been inhabited by the Wergaia people for thousands of years. Europeans first settled the area after the arrival of the railway in the early years of the 20th century. Being in the The Mallee region, the major industry is farming, predominantly sheep and wheat.

The name of the settlement dates from the construction of the railway line. A camp for the fettlers became a temporary location for the delivery of supplies and was designed "Temp’y Stopping Station", which was shortened to Tempy. Tempy railway station was opened in 1908 and was closed in 1982. A post office was opened on 18 July 1910.

Tempy Primary School was opened in June 1910 on a site about 1 mile (1.6 km) south of the town. The building was moved to the town itself in 1914, and replaced by a new building in 1919, where the Roman Catholic Church later stood. It was replaced in 1925 by a new school on the present site.

Tempy West State School (No. 3978) was opened 5 miles (8 km) west of the town in late 1918 but was closed in 1936.
