= Kunat =

Kunat Victoria
- Coordinates: 35°33′S 143°31′E
- Population: 36 (2016 census)
- Postcode(s): 3585
- Location: 332 km (206 mi) from Melbourne; 28 km (17 mi) from Swan Hill; 161 km (100 mi) from Robinvale; 246 km (153 mi) from Mildura
- LGA(s): Rural City of Swan Hill
Localities around Kunat:
Goschen	Castle Donnington	Lake Boga
Goschen	Kunat	Tresco West
Meatian	Lalbert	Lalbert

Kunat is a locality in Victoria, Australia, located approximately 28 km from Swan Hill, Victoria.

Kunat Post Office opened on 14 July 1900 and closed in 1949.
