= Nyarrin =

- Town
- Coordinates: 35°23′0″S 142°39′0″E
- Country: Australia
- State: Victoria
- LGA(s): Shire of Buloke
- Location: 381 km (237 mi) from Melbourne; 163 km (101 mi) from Mildura; 59 km (37 mi) from Ouyen; 102 km (63 mi) from Swan Hill

Population
  - Total(s): 17 (SAL 2021)
- Postcode: 3533
Localities around Nyarrin
Tyenna	Nandaly	Bimbourie
Straten	Nyarrin	Bimbourie
Turriff East	Ninda	Ninda

Nyarrin is a locality in Victoria, Australia, located approximately 59 km from Ouyen, Victoria.

Nyarrin Post Office opened on 2 November 1914 when the railway arrived, and closed in 1970.
