= Pira, Victoria =

Locality in Victoria, Australia

Pira Victoria
- Coordinates: 35°15′15″S 143°21′55″E
- Population: 10 (2016 census)
- Postcode(s): 3585
- Location: 361 km (224 mi) from Melbourne; 23 km (14 mi) from Swan Hill; 121 km (75 mi) from Ouyen; 201 km (125 mi) from Mildura
- LGA(s): Rural City of Swan Hill
Localities around Pira:
Nyrraby	Nyah West	Vinifera
Nowie	Pira	Woorinen North
Bulga	Bulga	Woorinen South

Pira is a locality in Victoria, Australia, located approximately 23 km from Swan Hill. It was a stop on the Piangil railway line but the station is now closed.

Pira Post Office opened on 14 July 1924 and closed in 1975.

In December 2017 Amanda Maher, a farmer from Pira, was awarded a Victorian Young Farmer's Scholarship.
