= Turriff East =

- Town
- Coordinates: 35°26′38″S 142°35′14″E
- Country: Australia
- State: Victoria
- LGA: Shire of Buloke

Government
  - State electorate: Mildura
  - Federal division: Mallee

Population
  - Total: 7 (SAL 2021)
- Postcode: 3488
Localities around Turriff East
| Speed | Straten | Nyarrin |
| Speed | Turriff East | Ninda |
| Turriff | Lascelles | Lascelles |

Turriff East is a locality in the Shire of Buloke, Victoria, Australia. The post office there opened on 16 October 1918 and was closed on 20 December 1940.
