= Lalbert =

- Town
- Coordinates: 35°40′0″S 143°22′0″E
- Country: Australia
- State: Victoria
- LGA: Shire of Gannawarra
- Location: 329 km (204 mi) NW of Melbourne; 44 km (27 mi) S of Swan Hill

Government
  - State electorate: Murray Plains
  - Federal division: Mallee

Population
  - Total: 151 (2016 census)
- Postcode: 3542
Localities around Lalbert
Murnungin	Goschen	Kunat
Wangie	Lalbert	Beauchamp
Tittybong	Cannie	Beauchamp

Lalbert is a town in the Shire of Gannawarra, Victoria, Australia. Lalbert is situated 50 kilometres (31 mi) west of Kerang on the Swan Hill-Donald Road. At the 2016 census, Lalbert had a population of 151 declining from 224 just five years earlier.

== History ==
Named by Major Mitchell during his trek through the area in 1836, the name Lalbert (or L'Albert as it was originally spelt) is thought to derive from an Aboriginal word for the creeper that grew on the mallee trees at the time. The first white people to live in the district were the Ham brothers who took out a pastoral lease there in 1846. By 1850, their sheep run had been subdivided into three separate pastoral properties: the Lalbert, Titybong and Towaninnie runs. The 1865 gazetteer recorded that there were only around 40 white people in the district at the time, all of whom were employed on the sheep stations. The district around Lalbert, moreover, was said to be "fit for nothing except sheep grazing for which purpose the entire available land is taken up".

Lalbert is in the middle of the Mallee wheat growing area, which is renowned for its crops of wheat barley, oats, canola and legumes. It is 3 kilometres north of Tittybong. Situated 50 km west of Kerang, Lalbert is a mallee town. The town once had a cafe, two general stores, bakery, hotel, school, hall and recreation reserve; one cafe/store remains, the hotel, bakery, school and hall are gone. It is a major grain receiving centre.

Lake Lalbert, a few kilometres from town, is a flood filled lake and a significant environmental showpiece.

The nearest large town is Swan Hill.

== Railway ==
Lalbert is on the Robinvale railway line. Lalbert was connected when the line was extended to Ultima in 1900, and eventually to Robinvale in 1924. The last regular passenger service on the line ran from Bendigo to Robinvale on 3 June 1978, operated by a diesel electric railmotor (DERM). The last station master was Damian Cybula. The rail passenger service was replaced by Bendigo - Ultima and Swan Hill - Robinvale buses from 5 June 1978. The line is now used exclusively to haul grain.

== Football ==
The Mallee Eagle's Football Club plays in the Central Murray Football League. The team last won the premiership in 1996.
