= Cocamba =

Cocamba Victoria
- Coordinates: 35°07′S 142°54′E
- Population: 0 (2021 census) (Note: The ABS does not give a number as Cocamba had no people or a very low population in the 2021 Census, it is presumed that the population is 0.)
- Postcode(s): 3546
- Location: 422 km (262 mi) from Melbourne; 10 km (6 mi) from Manangatang; 151 km (94 mi) from Mildura; 73 km (45 mi) from Swan Hill
- LGA(s): Rural City of Swan Hill
- State electorate(s): Mallee
Localities around Cocamba:
Manangatang	Manangatang	Manangatang
Manangatang	Cocamba	Manangatang
Gerahmin	Chinkapook	Chinkapook

Cocamba is a locality in Victoria, Australia, located approximately 10 km from Manangatang, Victoria.

Cocamba Post Office opened on 13 December 1913 and closed in 1941.
