= Gowanford =

Gowanford Victoria
- Coordinates: 35°25′S 143°12′E
- Population: 3 (2016 census)
- Postcode(s): 3544
- Location: 358 km (222 mi) from Melbourne; 37 km (23 mi) from Swan Hill; 118 km (73 mi) from Robinvale; 203 km (126 mi) from Mildura
- LGA(s): Rural City of Swan Hill
Localities around Gowanford:
Waitchie	Waitchie	Nowie
Waitchie	Gowanford	Ultima
Waitchie	Ultima	Ultima

Gowanford is a locality in Victoria, Australia, located approximately 37 km from Swan Hill, Victoria.

The Post Office opened on 5 November 1923 as Ganeit, was renamed Gowanford in 1926 and closed in 1962.
