= Murnungin =

Murnungin Victoria
- Coordinates: 35°37′S 143°14′E
- Population: 12 (2016 census)
- Postcode(s): 3544
- Location: 334 km (208 mi) from Melbourne; 49 km (30 mi) from Swan Hill; 51 km (32 mi) from Quambatook; 86 km (53 mi) from Kerang
- LGA(s): Rural City of Swan Hill
Localities around Murnungin:
Chinangin	Ultima	Meatian
Springfield	Murnungin	Lalbert
Culgoa	Wangie	Wangie

Murnungin is a locality in Victoria, Australia, located approximately 49 km from Swan Hill, Victoria.
