= Swan Hill West =

- Suburb
- Interactive map of Swan Hill West
- Coordinates: 35°21′57″S 143°24′21″E
- Country: Australia
- State: Victoria
- City: Swan Hill
- LGA: Rural City of Swan Hill

Government
  - State electorate: Murray Plains
  - Federal division: Mallee

Population
  - Total: 4 (2016 census)
- Postcode: 3585
Suburbs around Swan Hill West
Bulga	Bulga	Woorinen South
Nowie	Swan Hill West	Swan Hill
Ultima	Ultima East	Goschen

Swan Hill West is a locality located in the 'Lakes' Ward of the Rural City of Swan Hill, Victoria, Australia.
