= Nowie, Victoria =

Nowie Victoria
- Coordinates: 35°20′S 143°16′E
- Population: 21 (2016 census)
- Postcode(s): 3585
- Location: 365 km (227 mi) from Melbourne; 26 km (16 mi) from Swan Hill; 131 km (81 mi) from Robinvale; 216 km (134 mi) from Mildura
- LGA(s): Rural City of Swan Hill
Localities around Nowie:
Polisbet	Nyrraby	Pira
Waitchie	Nowie	Bulga, Swan Hill West
Gowanford	Ultima	Ultima East

Nowie is a locality in Victoria, Australia, located approximately 26 km from Swan Hill, Victoria.

A Post Office opened as Hill's around 1914, was renamed Nowie South in 1915 and closed in 1918. A Nowie North Post Office opened on 1 July 1923 and closed in 1958.
