= Meatian =

- Town
- Coordinates: 35°34′S 143°20′E
- Country: Australia
- State: Victoria
- LGAs: Rural City of Swan Hill; Shire of Gannawarra
- Location: 344 km (214 mi) from Melbourne; 37 km (23 mi) from Swan Hill; 146 km (91 mi) from Ouyen; 250 km (160 mi) from Mildura

Government
  - Federal division: Mallee

Population
  - Total: 20 (2016 census)
- Postcode: 3585
Localities around Meatian
Ultima	Ultima	Goschen
Ultima	Meatian	Lalbert
Murnungin	Lalbert	Lalbert

Meatian is a locality in Victoria, Australia, located approximately 37 kilometers from Swan Hill, Victoria. Meatian is a small Victorian unbounded locality within the local government area of Gannawarra, it is located approximately 288 km from the capital Melbourne.

The Meatian Post Office opened around 1904 and closed in 1972.
