= Ninda =

- Town
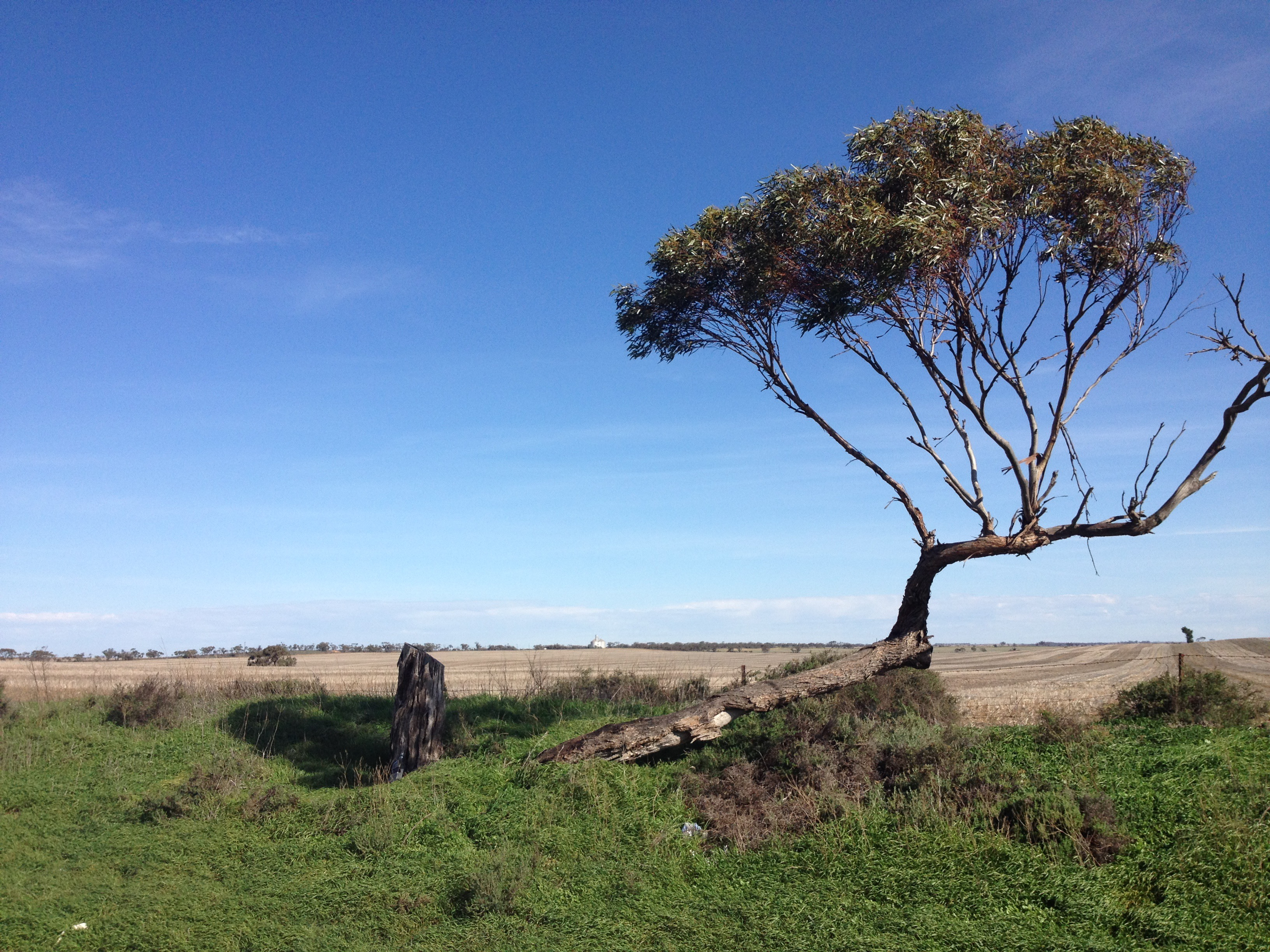

- Coordinates: 35°27′0″S 142°46′0″E
- Country: Australia
- State: Victoria
- LGA: Shire of Buloke
- Location: 366 km (227 mi) from Melbourne; 56 km (35 mi) from Hopetoun; 87 km (54 mi) from Swan Hill; 226 km (140 mi) from Bendigo

Population
  - Total: 9 (SAL 2021)
- Postcode: 3533
Localities around Ninda
Nyarrin	Bimbourie	Lake Tyrrell
Turriff East	Ninda	Sea Lake
Lascelles	Lascelles	Myall

Ninda is a locality in Victoria, Australia, located approximately 13 km from Sea Lake, Victoria.

Ninda Post Office opened on 2 November 1914, when the railway arrived and closed in 1958.
