= Chinangin =

Chinangin Victoria
- Coordinates: 35°31′S 143°12′E
- Population: 131 (2016 census)
- Postcode(s): 3544
- Location: 346 km (215 mi) from Melbourne; 42 km (26 mi) from Swan Hill; 127 km (79 mi) from Ouyen; 133 km (83 mi) from Robinvale
- LGA(s): Rural City of Swan Hill
Localities around Chinangin:
Waitchie	Ultima	Ultima
Springfield	Chinangin	Ultima
Springfield	Springfield	Murnungin

Chinangin is a locality in Victoria, Australia, located approximately 42 km from Swan Hill.
