= Tyrrell, Victoria =

Tyrrell
- Town
- Coordinates: 35°25′11″S 142°59′49″E
- Country: Australia
- State: Victoria
- LGAs: Rural City of Swan Hill; Shire of Buloke

Government
  - State electorates: Murray Plains; Mildura
  - Federal division: Mallee

Population
  - Total: 13 (2,016 census}
- Postcode: 3533
Localities around Tyrrell
Tyrrell Downs	Tyrrell Downs	Waitchie
Sea Lake	Tyrrell	Waitchie
Sea Lake	Sea Lake	Springfield

Tyrrell is a locality in the Rural City of Swan Hill and the Shire of Buloke, Victoria, Australia. Tyrrell West post office opened on 29 May 1909 and was closed on 2 November 1914. Long Plains post office opened in 1902 and was closed on 31 July 1940.
