= Castle Donnington, Victoria =

Castle Donnington
- Town
- Coordinates: 35°25′0″S 143°36′0″E
- Country: Australia
- State: Victoria
- LGA: Rural City of Swan Hill
- Location: 328 km (204 mi) from Melbourne; 10 km (6.2 mi) from Swan Hill; 143 km (89 mi) from Robinvale; 228 km (142 mi) from Bendigo

Population
  - Total: 139 (SAL 2021)
- Postcode: 3585
Localities around Castle Donnington
Swan Hill	Swan Hill	Pental Island
Swan Hill	Castle Donnington	Lake Boga
Goschen	Kunat	Lake Boga

Castle Donnington is a locality in the Rural City of Swan Hill, Victoria, Australia.
