= Tyntynder =

Tyntynder Victoria
- Coordinates: 35°14′S 143°32′E
- Population: 151 (2016 census)
- Postcode(s): 3586
- Location: 356 km (221 mi) NE of Melbourne; 13 km (8 mi) N of Swan Hill
- LGA(s): Rural City of Swan Hill
- State electorate(s): Murray Plains
- Federal division(s): Mallee
Localities around Tyntynder:
Speewa	New South Wales	New South Wales
Beverford	Tyntynder	New South Wales
Tyntynder South	Tyntynder South	Murraydale

Tyntynder is a locality in the south-east of the Mallee region of Victoria, Australia. Tyntynder Football Club is an Australian rules football team in the Central Murray Football League.

Tyntynder post office opened on 4 May 1894, then it was renamed Nyah Post Office 1 November 1894, but closed on 8 August 1944. At the 2016 census, Tyntynder and the surrounding area had a population of 151.
