= Ultima East =

- Town
- Coordinates: 35°26′26″S 143°22′38″E
- Country: Australia
- State: Victoria
- LGA: Rural City of Swan Hill

Government
  - State electorate: Murray Plains
  - Federal division: Mallee

Population
  - Total: 3 (2,016 census)
- Postcode: 3544
Localities around Ultima East
| Nowie | Swan Hill West | Swan Hill West |
| Ultima | Ultima East | Goschen |
| Ultima | Ultima | Goschen |

Ultima East is a locality in the Rural City of Swan Hill, Victoria, Australia.
