= Chinkapook =

- Town
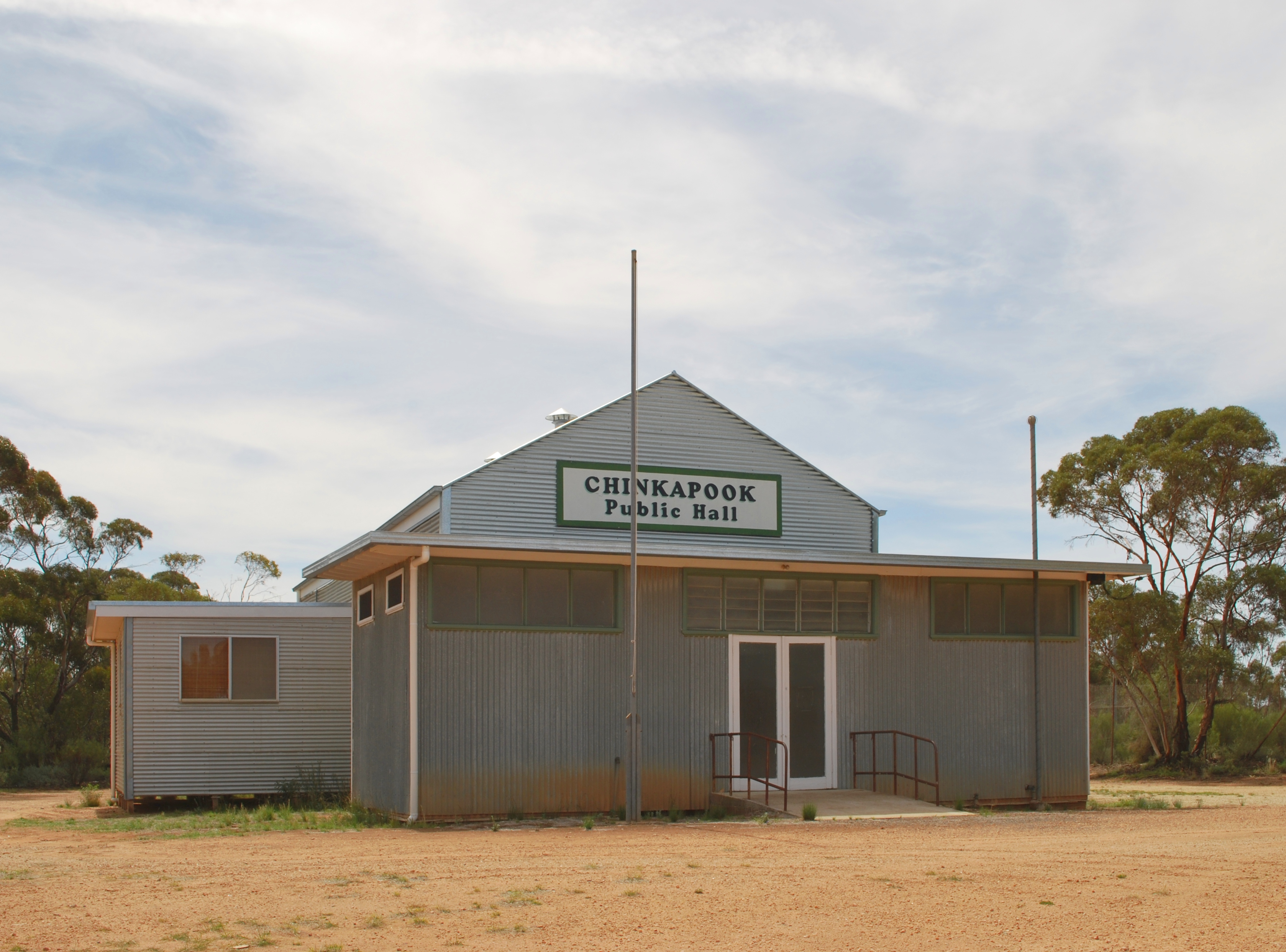
- Public hall

- Coordinates: 35°11′S 142°57′E
- Country: Australia
- State: Victoria
- LGA: Rural City of Swan Hill
- Location: 394 km (245 mi) northwest of Melbourne; 67 km (42 mi) northwest of Swan Hill; 73 km (45 mi) south of Robinvale; 158 km (98 mi) southeast of Mildura

Government
  - Federal division: Mallee

Population
  - Total: 17 (2021 census)
- Postcode: 3546
Localities around Chinkapook
Cocamba	Cocamba	Manangatang
Gerahmin	Chinkapook	Turoar
Lake Tyrrell	Tyrrell Downs	Chillingollah

Chinkapook is a locality in Victoria, Australia, located approximately 67 km from Swan Hill. It is on the Robinvale railway line, 70 km south of the terminus at Robinvale.

The Post Office opened on 12 September 1910 as Christmas Tank, was renamed Chinkapook in 1914 and closed in 1974.

In 1990, the popular youth ABC TV music program, Countdown Revolution, hosted a live event at Chinkapook, which featured the band Roxus on stage.

Many of the notebooks owned by the Australian poet John Shaw Neilson were destroyed or severely damaged in a mouse plague at Chinkapook. Douglas Stewart's poem "The Mice of Chinkapook" refers to this event.

== Gallery ==
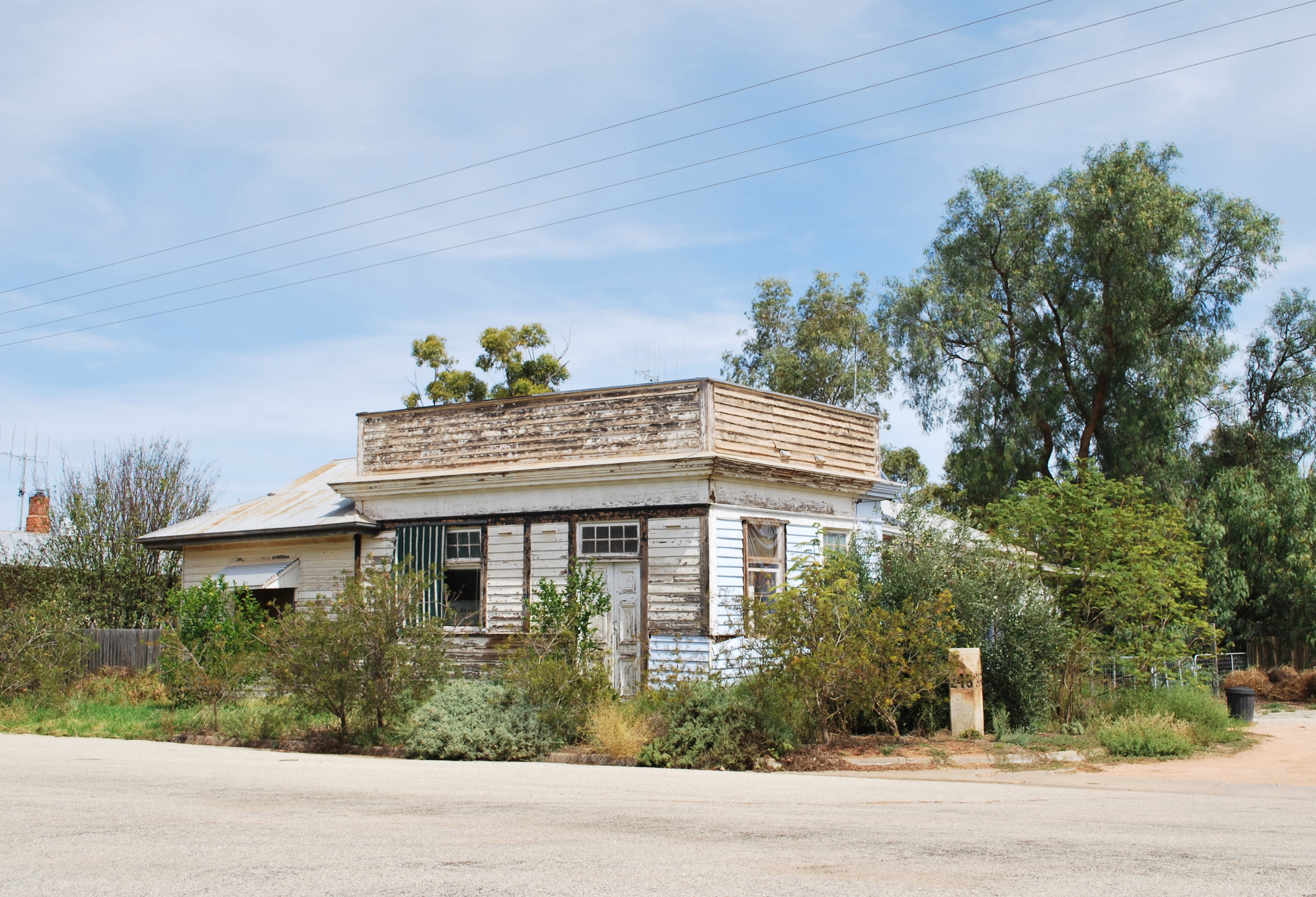
The former CBA Bank

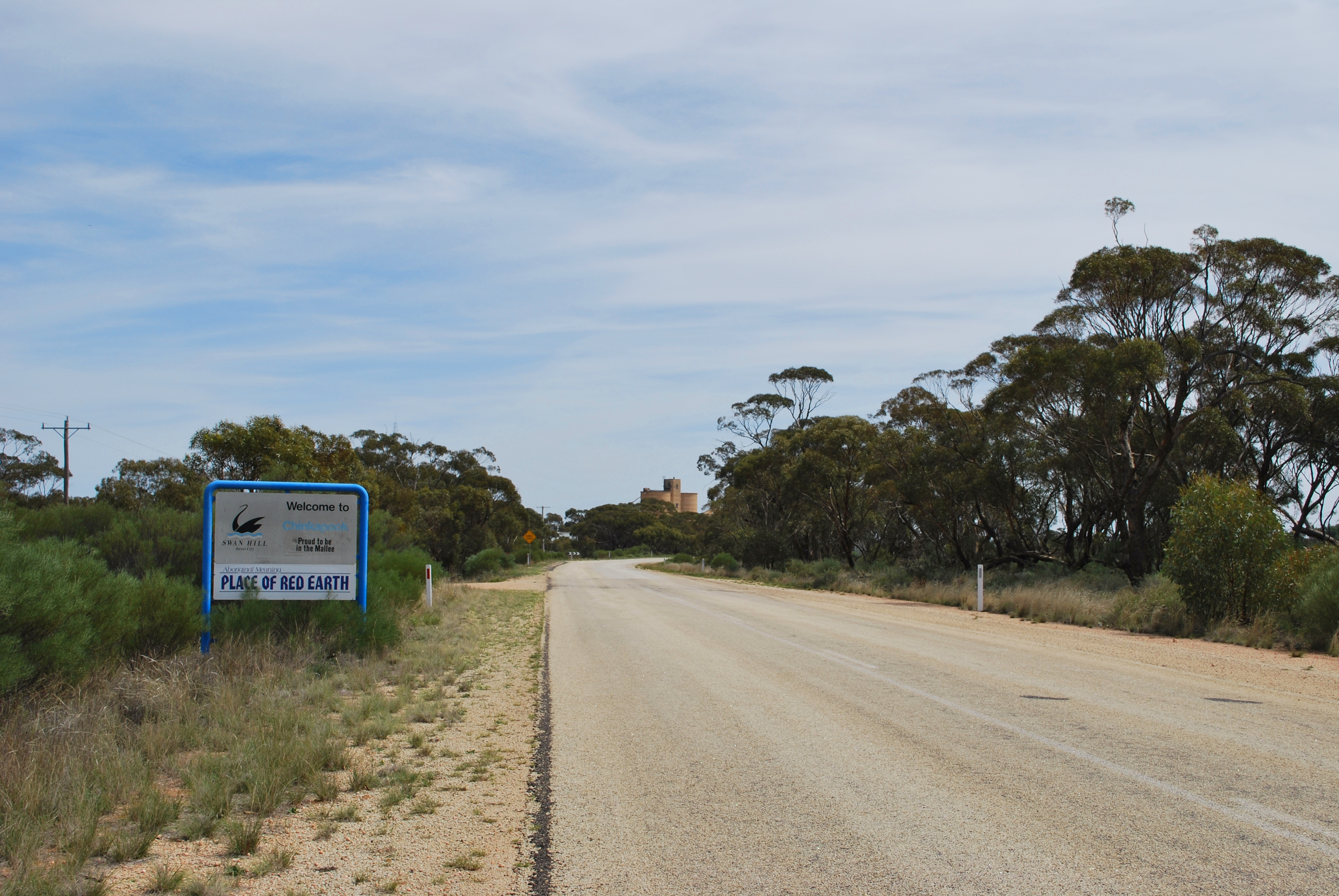
Entering Chinkapook

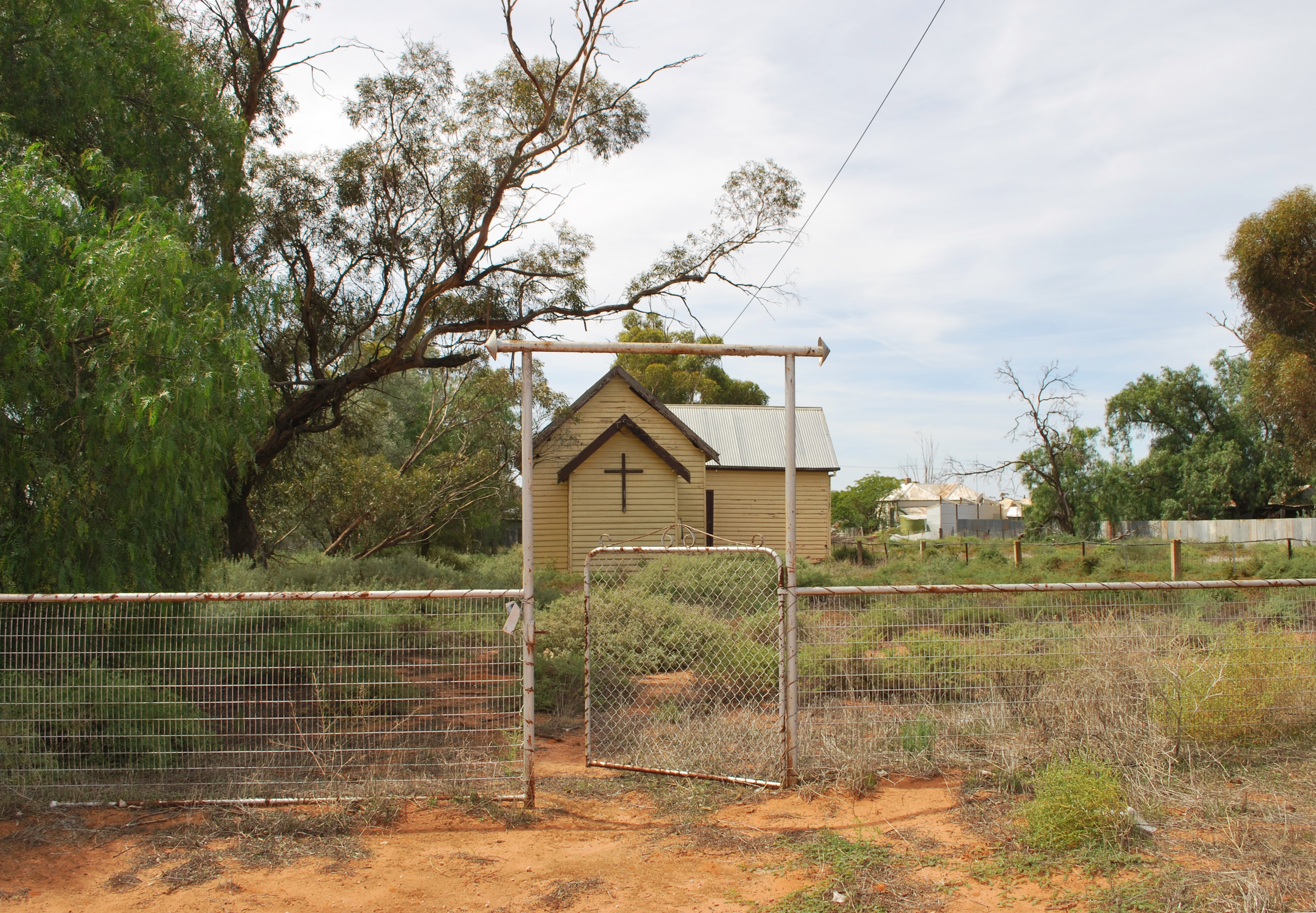
Uniting Church
