= Vinifera, Victoria =

Vinifera Victoria
- Coordinates: 35°12′S 143°23′E
- Population: 159 (2016 census)
- Postcode(s): 3591
- Location: 360 km (224 mi) from Melbourne; 22 km (14 mi) from Swan Hill; 192 km (119 mi) from Mildura; 78 km (48 mi) from Sea Lake
- LGA(s): Rural City of Swan Hill
- Federal division(s): Mallee
Localities around Vinifera:
Nyah	New South Wales	New South Wales
Nyah West	Vinifera	Beverford
Pira	Pira	Woorinen North

Vinifera is a locality in Victoria, Australia, located approximately 22 km from Swan Hill. It was named after Vitis vinifera the Common Grape Vine, when grapes were planted here on irrigated land. As of the 2016 census, Vinifera has a population of 159.

The Post Office opened on 1 February 1907 as Tyntynder West and was renamed Vinifera in 1922.
