= Coobool Creek =

Archaeological site in New South Wales, Australia

Coolbool Creek is an archaeological site near the Wakool River in New South Wales, Australia. It is about halfway between Swan Hill and Deniliquin. The site is near Doherty's Hut at Coobool Crossing, although the exact spot is unknown.

== Human remains ==
In 1950, G. M. Black found 126 skulls at the site. It has been difficult to give an exact age for the skulls, but one has been dated to 14,300 years ago. Some of the skulls also show artificial cranial deformation. The age, location, and deformities make the site similar to another Pleistocene site at Kow Swamp. Some scientists have said that this shows they were part of the same population, but others have disagreed. Because Coolbool Creek skulls were found on the surface it is difficult to date them, and other scientists have argued that they might be much older.

The skulls were kept at the University of Melbourne until 1984. They were then returned to the local Aboriginal communities and reburied.
