= Murraydale =

Murraydale Victoria
- Coordinates: 35°17′15″S 143°33′30″E
- Population: 1252016 census
- Postcode(s): 3586
- LGA(s): Rural City of Swan Hill
- State electorate(s): Murray Plains
- Federal division(s): Mallee
Localities around Murraydale:
Tyntynder	Tyntynder	New South Wales
Tyntynder South	Murraydale	New South Wales
Tyntynder South	Swan Hill	New South Wales

Murraydale is a locality located in the 'Central' Ward of the Rural City of Swan Hill, Victoria, Australia. A post office opened in Murraydale on 4 December 1916 and was closed on 30 June 1969.
