= Murrawee =

Murrawee Victoria
- Coordinates: 35°17′54″S 143°31′05″E
- Population: 1432016 census
- Postcode(s): 3586
- LGA(s): Rural City of Swan Hill
- State electorate(s): Murray Plains
- Federal division(s): Mallee
Localities around Murrawee:
Tyntynder South	Tyntynder South	Tyntynder South
Woorinen South	Murrawee	Swan Hill
Woorinen South	Swan Hill	Swan Hill

Murrawee is a locality located in the Rural City of Swan Hill, Victoria, Australia. Murrawee post office opened on 8 December 1921 and was closed on 14 May 1947.
