= Tresco West =

- Town
- Coordinates: 35°30′06″S 143°38′19″E
- Country: Australia
- State: Victoria
- LGA: Rural City of Swan Hill

Government
  - State electorate: Murray Plains
  - Federal division: Mallee

Population
  - Total: 152 (2,016 census)
- Postcode: 3584
Localities around Tresco West
Lake Boga	Lake Boga	Lake Boga
Kunat	Tresco West	Tresco
Beauchamp	Beauchamp	Mystic Park

Tresco West is a locality in the Rural City of Swan Hill, Victoria, Australia. Tresco West post office opened on 8 January 1923 and was closed on 11 November 1925.
