= Tyntynder South =

Tyntynder South Victoria
- Coordinates: 35°17′13″S 143°31′05″E
- Population: 250 (SAL 2021)
- Postcode(s): 3586
- LGA(s): Rural City of Swan Hill
- State electorate(s): Murray Plains
- Federal division(s): Mallee
Localities around Tyntynder South:
Beverford	Tyntynder	Tyntynder
Woorinen	Tyntynder South	Murraydale
Woorinen South	Murrawee	Swan Hill

Tyntynder South is a locality in the Rural City of Swan Hill, Victoria, Australia. Eastburn's post office opened in 1902, was renamed Tyntynder South in July 1911 and closed on 30 June 1969.
