= Bulga, Victoria =

Bulga Victoria
- Coordinates: 35°18′15″S 143°20′31″E
- Population: 0 (2016 census)
- Postcode(s): 3586
- LGA(s): Rural City of Swan Hill
- State electorate(s): Murray Plains
- Federal division(s): Mallee
Localities around Bulga:
Nowie	Pira	Pira
Nowie	Bulga	Woorinen South
Nowie	Nowie	Swan Hill West

Bulga is a locality located in the local government area of the Rural City of Swan Hill, Victoria, Australia. Bulga post office opened in 1905, renamed Bulga State School in 1906, renamed back to Bulga in 1935 and was closed on the 31 March 1953.
