= Rural City of Swan Hill =

Coordinates: 35°03′00″S 142°55′00″E

- Local government area
- Location in Victoria

- Interactive map of Rural City of Swan Hill
- Country: Australia
- State: Victoria
- Region: Loddon Mallee
- Established: 1995
- Council seat: Swan Hill

Government
  - Mayor: Les McPhee
  - State electorates: Mildura; Murray Plains
  - Federal division: Mallee

Area
  - Total: 6,115 km^{2} (2,361 sq mi)

Population
  - Total: 21,403 (2021)
  - Density: 3.5001/km^{2} (9.0652/sq mi)
- Gazetted: 20 January 1995
- Website: Rural City of Swan Hill
LGAs around Rural City of Swan Hill
Mildura	Balranald (NSW)	Balranald (NSW)
Mildura	Rural City of Swan Hill	Murray River (NSW)
Buloke	Buloke	Gannawarra

The Rural City of Swan Hill is a local government area in Victoria, Australia, located in the north-western part of the state. It covers an area of 6,115 square kilometres (2,361 mi^{2}) and, in August 2021, had a population of 21,403. It includes the towns of Swan Hill, Lake Boga, Manangatang, Nyah, Nyah West, Piangil, Robinvale, Ultima and Woorinen South.

The Rural City is governed and administered by the Swan Hill Rural City Council. Its seat of local government and administrative centre is located at the council headquarters in Swan Hill; it also has a service centre located in Robinvale. The Rural City is named after the city of Swan Hill, the Shire's major urban settlement, which had a population of 10,869 in 2021.

== History ==
The Rural City of Swan Hill was formed in 1995 in what was described as a "natural amalgamation" of the City of Swan Hill, Shire of Swan Hill, and a small portion of the Shire of Kerang comprising the southern Tresco district.

Proposing the new LGA in a 1994 report, the Local Government Board described the area as Victoria's "salad bowl". The Rural City was to take in the regional service hub of Swan Hill, a mix of dryland and irrigated agriculture, and a tourism sector oriented around the Murray River and Lake Boga. A public consultation carried out by the Shire of Swan Hill in 1994 found that more than 60% of respondents were in favour of the merger.

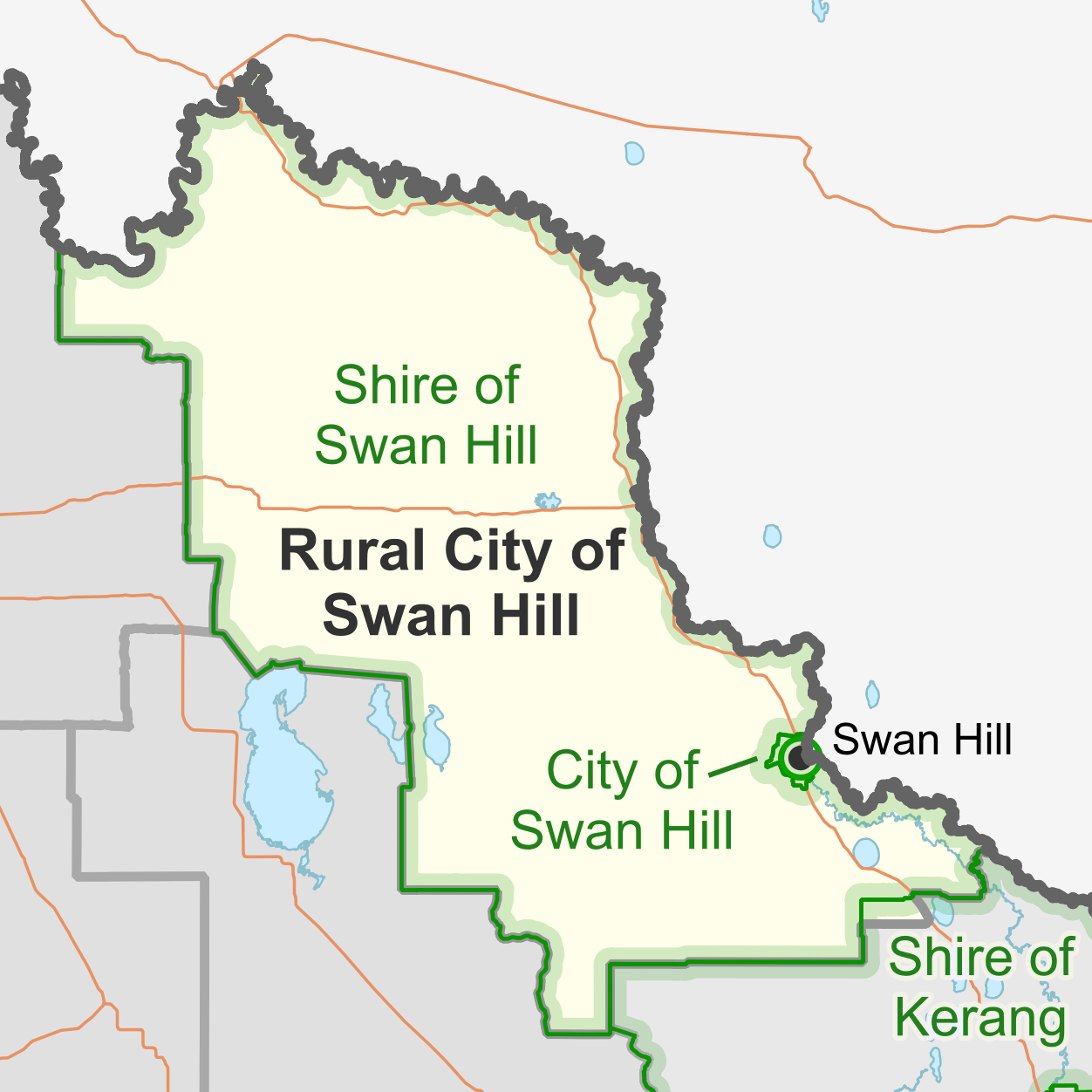
The Rural City's predecessor LGAs (green) as they were in 1994

== Council ==
=== Current composition ===
The council is composed of four wards and seven councillors, with four councillors elected to represent the Central Ward and one councillor per remaining ward elected to represent each of the other wards.

Ward	Party	Councillor	Notes
Central	Independent	Chris Jeffery	
Central	United Australia Party	Stuart King	
Central	Independent	Bill Moar	Mayor (2019–2022)
Central	Independent	Ann Young	Mayor (2016–2019)
Lakes	Independent	Les McPhee	Mayor (2022-present)
Murray-Mallee	Independent	Nicole McKay	
Robinvale	Independent	Jacqui Kelly	Elected in 2023 on a countback to replace Jade Benham

=== Administration and governance ===
The council meets in the council chambers at the council headquarters in the Swan Hill Municipal Offices, which is also the location of the council's administrative activities. It also provides customer services at both its administrative centre in Swan Hill, and its service centre in Robinvale.

== Townships and localities ==
The 2021 census, the rural city had a population of 21,403 up from 20,584 in the 2016 census

Population
Locality	2016	2021
Annuello	25	40
Bannerton	40	78
Beauchamp^	44	44
Beverford	336	337
Bolton	12	15
Boundary Bend	132	154
Bulga	3	0
Castle Donnington	131	139
Chillingollah	5	3
Chinangin	6	3
Chinkapook	32	17
Cocamba	4	4
Fish Point	15	11
Gerahmin	21	11
Goschen	27	35
Gowanford	3	8
Happy Valley	85	87
Kenley	48	64
Kooloonong	39	19
Kunat	36	45
Lake Boga	985	982
Lake Powell	19	86
Liparoo	38	33
Manangatang	309	274
Meatian^	20	19
Miralie	0	0
Murnungin	12	14
Murrawee	143	126
Murraydale	125	105
Narrung	18	24
Natya	38	40
Nowie	21	24
Nyah	530	536
Nyah West	663	673
Nyrraby	18	18
Pental Island	135	159
Piangil	259	230
Pira	10	16
Polisbet	5	5
Robinvale	3,088	3,497
Speewa	*	#
Swan Hill	10,905	11,186
Swan Hill West	4	11
Tol Tol	142	175
Towan	11	13
Tresco	209	162
Tresco West	152	153
Turoar	0	8
Tyntynder	151	157
Tyntynder South	268	250
Tyrrell^	13	16
Ultima	174	173
Ultima East	3	0
Vinifera	159	163
Waitchie	48	43
Wandown	0	0
Wemen	111	128
Winlaton	7	0
Winnambool	22	8
Wood Wood	85	91
Woorinen	260	262
Woorinen North	87	94
Woorinen South	356	404

^ - Territory divided with another LGA
* - Not noted in 2016 Census
# - Not noted in 2021 Census

== Sister cities ==
- Yamagata, Yamagata, Japan

== See also ==
- List of places of worship in the Rural City of Swan Hill
- List of places on the Victorian Heritage Register in the Rural City of Swan Hill
