= Tyenna, Victoria =

Tyenna
- Town
- Coordinates: 35°19′02″S 142°34′24″E
- Country: Australia
- State: Victoria
- LGA: Shire of Buloke

Government
  - State electorate: Mildura
  - Federal division: Mallee

Population
  - Total: 4 (SAL 2021)
- Postcode: 3533
Localities around Tyenna
Tempy	Tempy	Nandaly
Tempy	Tyenna	Nandaly
Tempy	Straten	Nyarrin

Tyenna is a locality in the Shire of Buloke, Victoria, Australia.

Tyenna State School opened in 1915, and was replaced with a one-room school building in 1923. The school closed in 1946, with the building being removed.
