= Woorinen North =

Woorinen North Victoria
- Coordinates: 35°14′16″S 143°25′41″E
- Population: 94 (2021 census)
- Postcode(s): 3589
- LGA(s): Rural City of Swan Hill
- State electorate(s): Murray Plains
- Federal division(s): Mallee
Localities around Woorinen North:
Vinifera	Beverford	Beverford
Vinifera	Woorinen North	Beverford
Pira	Woorinen South	Woorinen

Woorinen North is a locality in the local government area of the Rural City of Swan Hill, Victoria, Australia. Dorrington post office opened on 6 January 1921, was renamed Woorinen North on 1 March 1922 and was closed on 19 November 1976.
