= Goschen, Victoria =

Goschen Victoria
- Coordinates: 35°29′S 143°28′E
- Population: 27 (2016 census)
- Postcode(s): 3585
- Location: 347 km (216 mi) from Melbourne; 20 km (12 mi) from Swan Hill; 147 km (91 mi) from Ouyen; 153 km (95 mi) from Robinvale
- LGA(s): Rural City of Swan Hill
Localities around Goschen:
Ultima East	Swan Hill West	Swan Hill
Ultima	Goschen	Castle Donnington
Meatian	Lalbert	Kunat

Goschen is a locality in Victoria, Australia, located approximately 20 km from Swan Hill, Victoria.

Goschen Post Office opened on 6 November 1901 and closed in 1942.

== See also ==
- Viscount Goschen
