= Manangatang railway station =

Former railway station in Victoria, Australia

Coordinates: 35°03′06″S 142°53′01″E

Manangatang
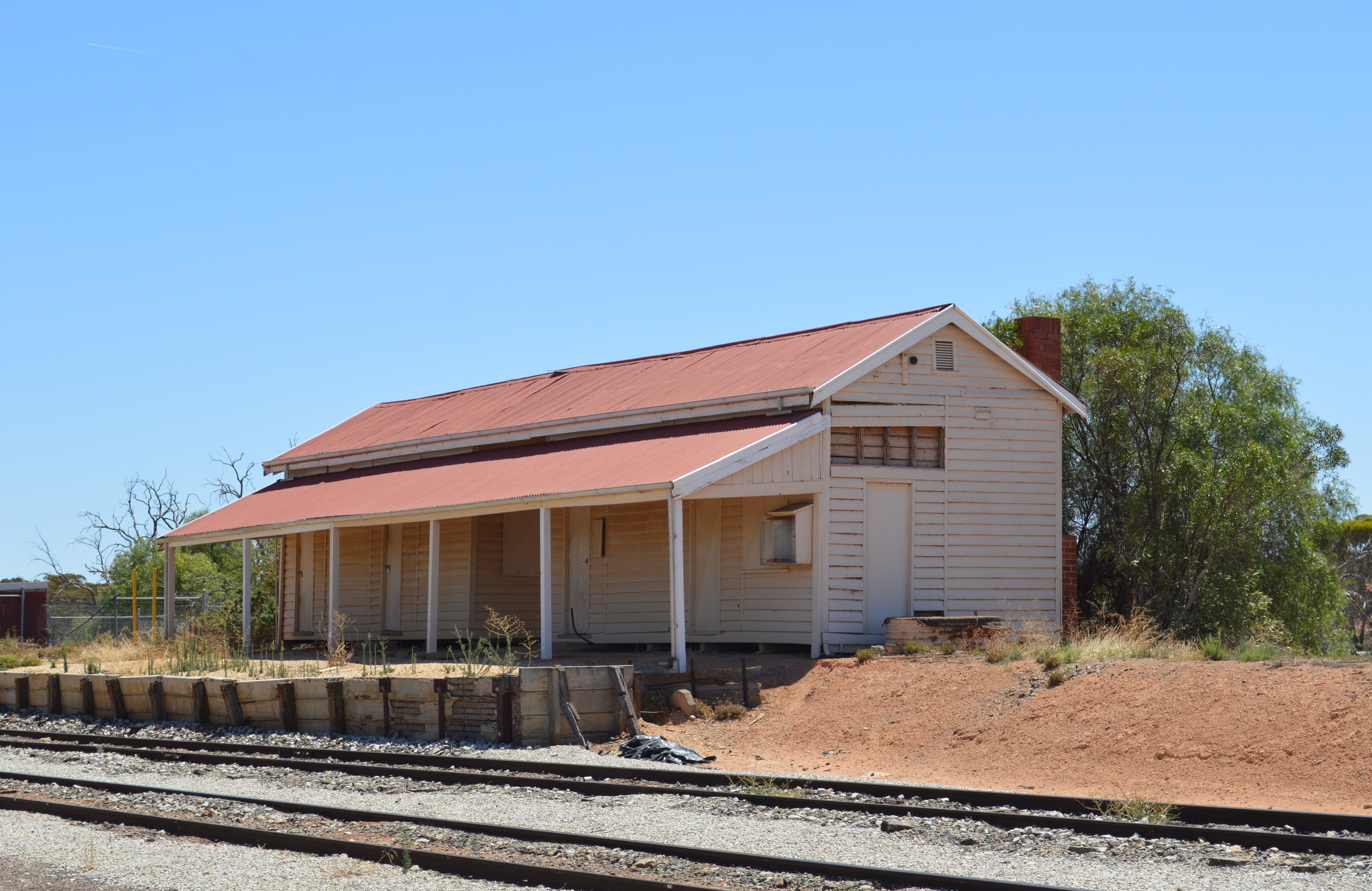

General information
- Line: Robinvale
- Platforms: 1
- Tracks: 1

Other information
- Status: Closed

Services
Preceding station	Disused railways	Following station
Cocamba	Robinvale line	Bolton
	List of closed railway stations in Victoria	
Location

Manangatang is a railway station located on the Robinvale railway line in the town of Manangatang in Victoria, Australia. If not for heritage funds, the station would have been demolished. Today the station is preserved by funding grants.
