= Manangatang =

- Town
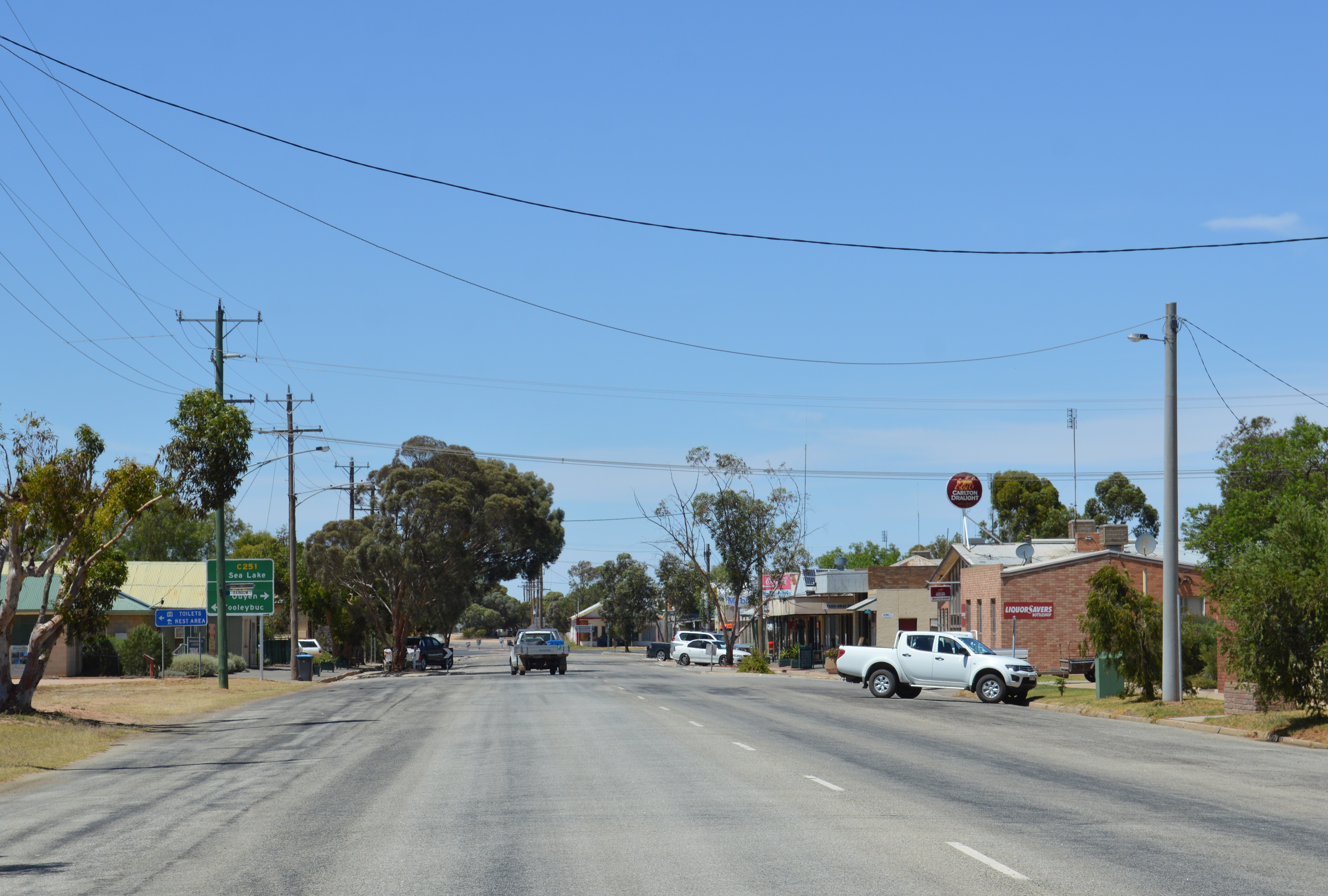
- Wattle Street, the main street of Manangatang

- Coordinates: 35°03′0″S 142°52′0″E
- Country: Australia
- State: Victoria
- LGA: Rural City of Swan Hill
- Location: 412 km (256 mi) NW of Melbourne; 85 km (53 mi) NW of Swan Hill; 58 km (36 mi) E of Ouyen; 48 km (30 mi) W of Tooleybuc

Government
  - State electorate: Mildura
  - Federal division: Mallee
- Elevation: 56 m (184 ft)

Population
  - Total: 274 (2021 census)
- Postcode: 3546
Localities around Manangatang
Winnambool	Bolton	Natya
Kulwin	Manangatang	Piangil
Gerahmin	Cocamba, Chinkapook	Turoar

Manangatang (/məˈnæŋɡətæŋ/ mə-NANG-gə-tang) is a town in north-western Victoria, Australia. At the 2021 census, Manangatang had a population of 274. It is sometimes noted for its unusual name, from an Aboriginal term "manang" meaning land and "kaaiti" meaning water.

== Transport ==
Manangatang is positioned on the Robinvale railway line. Manangatang was the terminus from 1914 until the line was extended in 1921. Passenger service to Manangatang railway station ceased in 1978. The Mallee Highway crosses the railway and the Robinvale–Sea Lake Road at Manangatang.

The Avoca railway line is to be reopened (as of 2017) as standard gauge and upgraded to 21-tonne axle loads, with insertion of over 100,000 new concrete sleepers. The second reopening of this cross country line is primarily to allow for the carriage of mineral sands from Manangatang to a processing plant at Hamilton.

== History ==
A Mr A T Creswick, who held the Bumbang station, had a hut on or near the present township. Surveyed blocks, each of about one square mile in area, were available in 1911. Manangatang was proclaimed a town in 1915. In January 1919, the local police station was set up with mounted Constable E E Dunkley in charge. 1930 saw settlement by some Punjabi emigrants. Mrs Della Dillon opened a store in the town in 1912. The first sale of township subdivision was in 1913 at prices ranging from 15 to 30 pounds.

The post office opened on 6 January 1913 when the township was settled. Miss Alice McKinnon was the Post Mistress from that time until 1958 when she sold the premises. Her 44 years of service was recognised by the public at a gathering in her honour that year. A progress association was successful in having state School no 3263 opened on 26 September 1914.

== Community ==
The local area consists mainly of farming, primarily wheat and sheep but also cows and birds such as squab.

The Manangatang Football Club, an Australian rules football team then competing in the Mallee Football League, was made famous by a catchphrase of commentator Lou Richards; "They couldn't beat the Manangatang thirds."

The town in conjunction with nearby township Tooleybuc, New South Wales now has an Australian rules football team competing in the Central Murray Football League.

Manangatang has a horse racing club, the Manangatang Racing Club, which holds one race meeting a year, the Manangatang Cup meeting on Caulfield Guineas day in October.

Golfers play at the course of the Manangatang Golf Club at the Recreation Reserve.

The town possesses Victoria's smallest public hospital and nursing home. Manangatang also has a combined high school and primary school, a preschool and a tennis club.

Manangatang has an Annual Reunion on the second Saturday of February at approx 10.30 am in the Fitzroy Gardens, Melbourne. The gathering is near the Fairy Tree and the kiosk. This reunion has been going for over 75 years.
