= Ultima, Victoria =

Ultima
- Town
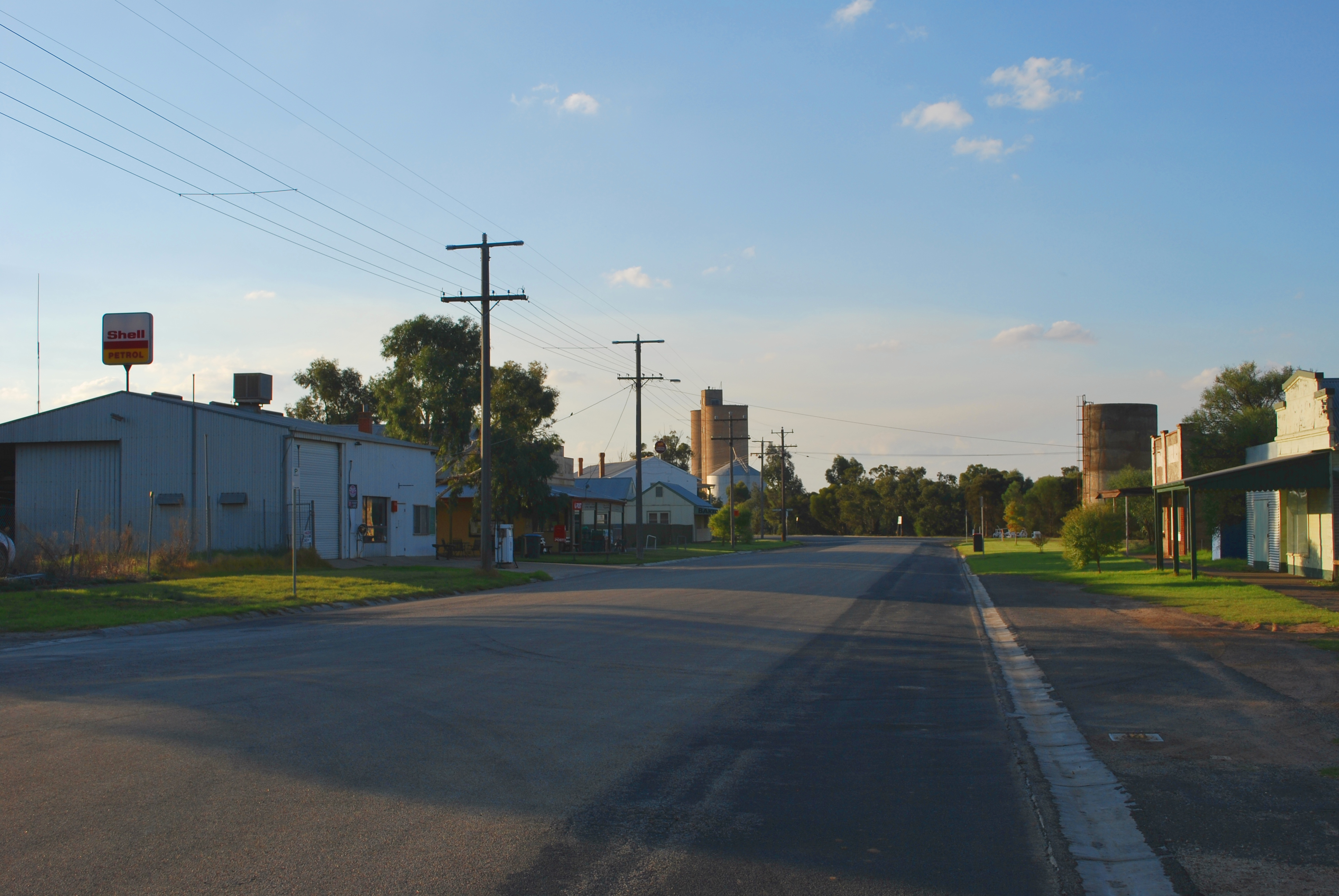
- Dillon St, the main street of Ultima

- Coordinates: 35°29′S 143°15′E
- Country: Australia
- State: Victoria
- LGA: Rural City of Swan Hill
- Location: 353 km (219 mi) NW of Melbourne; 35 km (22 mi) SW of Swan Hill; 40 km (25 mi) E of Sea Lake

Government
  - State electorate: Murray Plains
  - Federal division: Mallee

Population
  - Total: 173 (2021 census)
- Postcode: 3544
Localities around Ultima
Waitchie	Nowie	Ultima East
Gowanford	Ultima	Goschen
Chinangin	Murnungin	Meatian

Ultima is a town in the Rural City of Swan Hill, Victoria, Australia. The town is located 353 kilometres (219 mi) north-west of the state capital, Melbourne, and 35 kilometres (22 mi) south-west of Swan Hill. At the 2021 census, Ultima had a population of 173, down from 333 in 2011.

== Locality ==
The town of Ultima is bounded to the north by Waitchie Road which joins the Sea Lake-Swan Hill Road near the 14 Mile Bushland Reserve to the east. The eastern border extends south along Ceveri Road, west along Lake Boga-Ulitma Road, south again along Dog Netting Fence Road to join the southern boundary at Stumpy Lane and crossing the South Meatian Channel. At the junction of Stumpy Lane and Grey Road, the eastern boundary extends southwards again, crossing Rees Channel. The southernmost boundary extends westwards from the intersection of Grey Road with Meatian West Road, across Murnungin Channel at two points. Meatian West Road and Hancock Road junction makes the south-western corner of Ultima. Hancock Road heading north crosses Culgoa-Ultima Road to become Ford Road which meets Burns Road, and that extends a boundary westward, across another branch of Murnungin Channel to Loader Road, which forms the northern end of the western boundary to Waitchie Road.

== Geology ==
See main article Murray Basin

Ultima is situated in the Murray Basin, formed after Australia separated from Antarctica. The oldest rocks identified in the region are Cambrian-era ocean floor basalts distributed along major faults, particularly the Governor (aligned with the Murray River), Log Landing, and Griminal faults. The southern and western areas are covered by the Cambrian St Arnaud Group and the Ordovician Castlemaine Group, formations which were likely deformed during the Benambran Orogeny, followed by a significant period of granite intrusion. The Lalbert Batholith, south of Ultima exhibits an unusual magnetic pattern which may have resulted from dextral strain on the granites while they were still in a plastic state; an event that is one of the few Bindian occurrences recorded in western Victoria.

The Kanimblan Orogeny appears to have only impacted the southern part of the Governor Fault system, as well as the Lake Charm and associated faults. Limited direct evidence of further sedimentation appears in the Swan Hill region until the Cainozoic era, though Permian sediments from the Numurkah Trough centred 200 km east along the Murray, might be present, particularly in the eastern area. Around 120 basaltic plugs were intruded, but the surface deposits associated with these were likely eroded, contributing to the detritus of the Late Jurassic to Early Cretaceous Otway Group.

In more recent times, from the Eocene to the present, the riverine plains of the Murray Basin have been extensively covered by sediments. These sediments can be classified into four sequences. The oldest is the Eocene to Oligocene Olney Formation of the Renmark Group, which is predominantly fluvial and contains abundant plant material. It is overlaid by the Mologa Surface, which might record a period of monsoonal weather patterns. Above this is the Oligocene to Miocene Murray Group, which includes the fluvial Calivil Formation and the marginal marine Geera Clay. Further up are the Late Miocene to Pliocene Bookpurnong beds, Parilla Sand, and Shepparton Formation time equivalents, representing offshore marginal marine and onshore facies. All of these formations are below the Karoonda Surface. The present cycle consists of fluvial (Coonambidgal Formation), lacustrine (Blanchetown Clay and unnamed lunettes), and windblown sand (Woorinen Formation, Lowan Sand). The region also contains both sheet and strand line style heavy mineral deposits, with one strand line deposit having been mined at Wemen, 110 km to the north of Ultima Traces of uranium are known in the Lake Boga Granite, and there might be additional occurrences around Lake Tyrrell.

== Ecology ==
In June 1836, explorer Thomas Mitchell, travelled south-east along the Murray River and passed 35 km from what was to be Ultima. He noted that:

Every day we passed over land which for natural fertility and beauty could scarcely be surpassed; over streams of unfailing abundance and plains covered with the richest pasturage. Stately trees and majestic mountains adorned the ever-varying scenery of this region, the most southern of all Australia and the best.

By 1882 rabbit plagues were common in the district, with the Bendigo Advertiser reporting that:

As the Mallee at present exists the rabbits are fast compelling the licensees of Crown lands to abandon their holdings, the rabbits having increased month after month, depriving the sheep of food, and creating such terrible devastation that it will take may years before the country can recover its former condition. I have frequently noticed, when feed is scarce, sheep eating the dung of the rabbits, "Money Miller " of Euston had 140,000 sheep three years ago, and now his station will only carry 40,000. At Ultima they had 15.000, and now 2,000...

The development of irrigation in the Australian colonies of New South Wales, South Australia, and Victoria began in the 1860s and 1870s. In 1904, despite challenges like lack of capital and expertise, a stock water supply to Ultima was established from Long Lake near Lake Boga, and later from Lake Lonsdale storage through a gravitation channel. Irrigation efforts were centralised under powerful public agencies in 1906. Those agencies, including the Victorian State Rivers and Water Supply Commission, undertook significant engineering works to canalise the Murray River and control its flow for irrigation.

Over the years, various reservoirs, dams, and weirs were constructed, transforming the Murray River into an engineered system. However, the increased water supply for irrigation led to significant water losses through evaporation, leakage, and excessive application by farmers, resulting in salinity. By the 1930s, the irrigation districts of Northern Victoria had experienced a permanent rise in the water table.

Despite improvements, salinity remained a problem, causing productivity losses and economic hardships for farmers in areas like Ultima, Kerang, Cohuna, and Swan Hill. The lack of adequate drainage aggravated the situation, with some regions having extensive drainage systems while others faced rapid salinity.

From 1945 to 1994, Australia's Goulburn-Murray Irrigation District, incorporating Ultima, faced increasing soil salinity as a result of unsustainable irrigation practices. It became a major environmental threat, causing conflicts among rural communities. The urgency to address salinity grew in the 1970s after floods hit northern Victoria, raising water tables and exacerbating the problem. The pursuit of "environmental security" through irrigation development was hindered by its own effects, leading to environmental insecurity in the Goulburn-Murray Irrigation District (GMID). The conflicts over salinity escalated during that period, shaping the future of the GMID with ongoing environmental challenges.

Efforts by concerned individuals and government strategies brought some success, but it was the Millennium Drought (1996-2010) that ultimately provided relief from salinisation.

Yellow leaf spot (YLS) is a wheat disease caused by the fungus Pyrenophora tritici-repentis (Died.) Drech., with its conidial state known as Drechslera tritici-repentis (Died.) Shoem. The first appearance of YLS in Victoria was in 1983, specifically in Ultima, 33 years after it was first observed by Valder and Shaw in New South Wales and Queensland in 1952. For Western Australia and South Australia, the first recorded instances of YLS were in 1970, as reported by Khan et al. in 1971.

=== Nature reserves ===
A small permanent freshwater lake, continuously occupied by large numbers of blue-billed ducks, is located on the western side of the Lake Boga township, along Ultima-Lake Boga Rd, 18 km from Ultima. In the small 3 hectare 14-Mile Bushland reserve, situated 9.3 km north-east of Ultima, honeyeaters, crimson chats, cockatiels, budgerigars, bluebonnets, pied butcherbirds, yellow-throated miners, striated pardalotes and chestnut-rumped thornbills may be seen amongst its Mallee scrub. In October 2003, winged peppercress, a nationally endangered plant species, was found in the Stony Plain Bushland Reserve, 21 km west of Ultima.

== Climate ==
The Australian Bureau of Meteorology provides climate data for Swan Hill Aerodrome, 30 km NE of Ultima.

Statistics	Jan	Feb	Mar	Apr	May	Jun	Jul	Aug	Sep	Oct	Nov	Dec	Annual	Years	
Temperature
Mean maximum temperature (°C)	33.3	32.2	28.6	23.8	18.7	15.3	14.8	16.7	20.3	24.3	28.0	30.7	23.9	27	1996 2023
Mean minimum temperature (°C)	16.3	15.9	13.0	9.3	6.4	4.4	3.6	4.0	5.8	8.1	11.7	13.8	9.4	27	1996 2023
Rainfall
Mean rainfall (mm)	25.6	18.4	16.6	24.3	25.5	26.1	25.7	27.4	28.7	27.8	41.2	21.3	307.8	26	1996 2023
Decile 5 (median) rainfall (mm)	14.8	16.8	13.6	15.0	20.6	20.3	24.8	19.6	22.8	19.8	26.8	12.8	294.0	27	1996 2023
Mean number of days of rain ≥ 1 mm	3.2	1.8	2.1	2.7	4.1	4.7	5.4	5.4	5.0	3.9	4.4	3.1	45.8	26	1996 2023
Other daily elements
Mean daily sunshine (hours)															
Mean number of clear days	4.9	3.1	4.7	3.8	2.6	2.1	2.6	2.9	2.1	2.5	3.2	4.1	38.6	14	1996 2010
Mean number of cloudy days	2.2	1.2	1.8	2.4	2.3	2.9	2.6	2.4	2.1	1.9	2.4	2.3	26.5	14	1996 2010
9 am conditions
Mean 9 am temperature (°C)	21.3	20.4	17.0	15.0	10.8	7.6	7.1	8.9	12.6	15.6	18.2	19.6	14.5	14	1996 2010
Mean 9 am relative humidity (%)	50	55	61	63	78	87	85	78	66	54	53	49	65	14	1996 2010
Mean 9 am wind speed (km/h)	18.6	17.2	14.9	14.9	12.9	13.1	13.3	16.0	18.2	19.4	17.9	18.9	16.3	14	1996 2010

== History ==
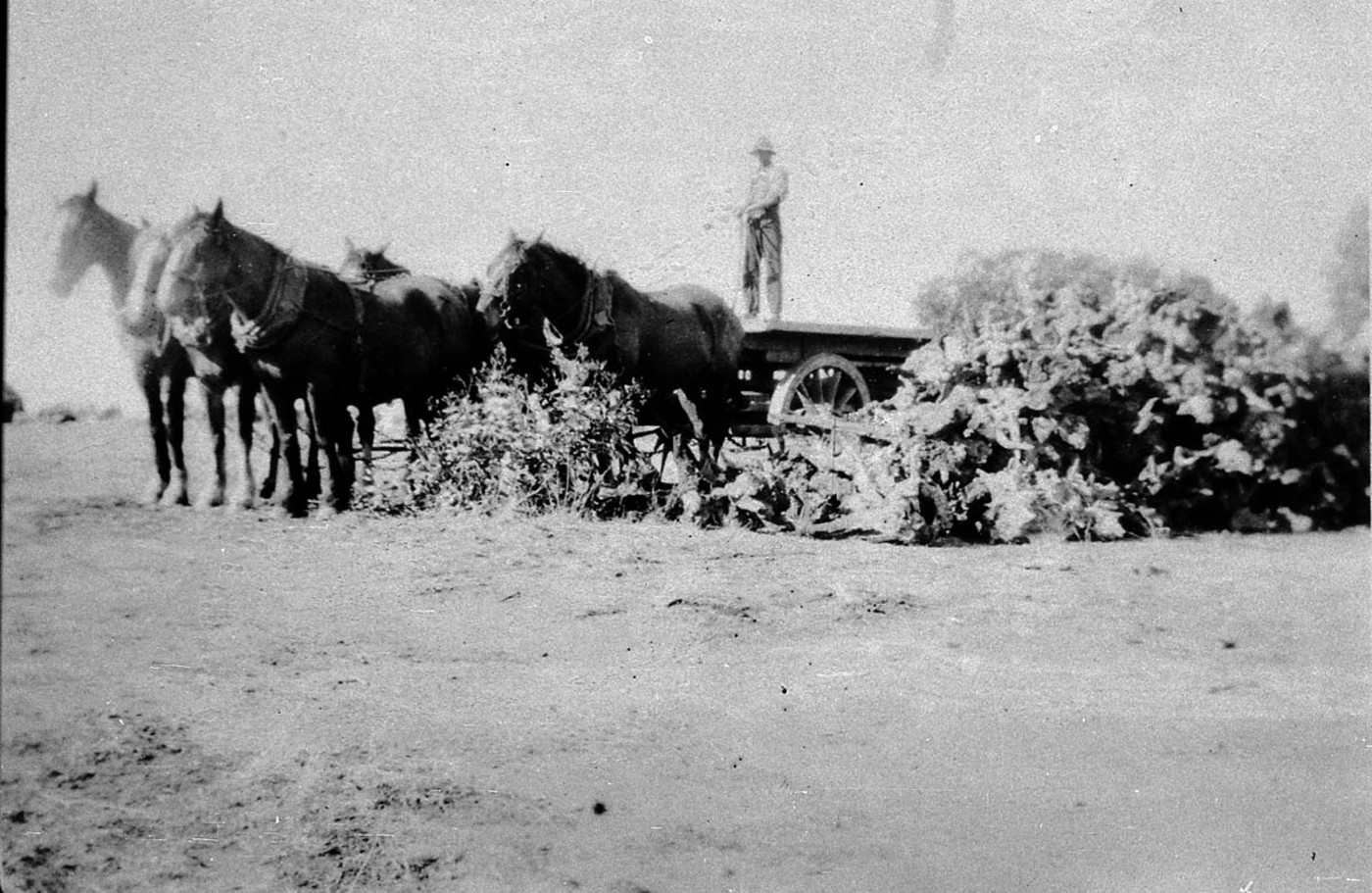
Ethel Jilbert (c.1900-1920) Albert Underwood carting Mallee roots for delivery to Melbourne for firewood

Archeological remains are evidence of occupation over millennia by the Barapa Barapa, or Barababaraba (also spelt Barapabarapa) people who are the original custodians of the land which they share with traditional neighbours, the Wemba Wemba and Yorta Yorta. Their neighbours to the west around Lake Tyrrell are Wergaia or Werrigia people and the Dja Dja Wurrung occupy the south.

The area known as Ultima was initially a pastoral run of 43,512 hectares, owned by a Mr. Cameron from 1850 to 1892, though the station was for sale in 1870. Tenders were called in 1887 for a mail run through Ultima to Swan Hill once a week. During a period of decentralisation after the gold rushes, James O'Connor having acquired the lease and having had several substantial buildings erected, subdivided the land and between 1890 and 1892 offered it for sale at £55 to £74 an acre, advertising that;

Mallee Land gives rapid and good returns, is easily worked at small cash expense, and numerous instances can be cited where settlers beginning with almost nothing are now by their energy and perseverance prospering and independent. Mallee Land near Swan Hill has not received so much attention hitherto as land in other districts; consequently while pronounced to be superior in quality it is very much cheaper. Everyone contemplating purchasing should inspect Ultima allotments at once. There is almost certain, with an increase in settlement, to be a rise in value of the land near Swan Hill. Remember, Swan Hill has the permanent River Murray to draw its water supply from. It is 20 miles nearer Melbourne by rail than Warracknabeal, and moreover the railway is direct to Swan Hill, and producers can send their produce away by rail or boat. Swan Hill is a railway terminus; and water trust channels are already excavated there. Settlement is rapidly increasing in the district.

Buyers, reportedly "enthusiastic," were derided by the Bendigo Independent for buying "an acre of rabbit burrows at three times the upset price of land within a mile of the Bendigo Town Hall." At the same time a township of 30 building lots was laid out and were selling for £55 to £74 an acre.

The Lands Department resumed the land in 1897 and subdivided it into one-square-mile blocks for auction, attracting around 100 applications. The most prosperous resident, Herbert Cuttle, opened the Ultima general store in 1899 and later contributed to the development of Robinvale. Ultima Post Office also opened on 27 July that year.

Farmers formed a railway league in the mid-1890s, taking one-guinea subscriptions, to reduce the costly cartage of wheat to Swan Hill. The railway extension from Quambatook to Ultima railway opened on 1 March 1900, and Ultima Primary School was established in 1902. but development was hindered by water scarcity and rabbit infestations. The 1902 drought exposed the area's deficiencies. By 1912, Ultima had a primary school, a Catholic church, a hotel, a coffee palace with accommodation for forty guests and several guest houses, a bush nursing hospital, a mechanics' institute, town hall, butcher and bakery, and football, netball, and tennis clubs.

After the First World War, returned soldiers who took up the offer to farm selections in the Mallee were given a second-class railway ticket for the 19 hour journey to Ultima and district. Robinvale, 120 km north of the town is named for Lieutenant George Robin Cuttle of Ultima who was killed in action during air combat over France during WWI, and whose mother hung a sign at the station which said Robin Vale ('farewell Robin' in Latin).

After marrying William Henry Jilbert in 1919, Ethel (née Stevens) photographed activities on their farm in Ultima with a Box Brownie; collections of her images are held in the State Libraries of New South Wales and Victoria.

Percy Stewart (1885-1931), a farmer and one of the five original members of the Country Party and M.L.A for Swan Hill 1917-19 and Federal Member of the House of Representatives for Wimmera 1919-1931, observed the effective lobbying of the Canadian grain growers' associations so became an advocate for compulsory nation-wide wheat pools big enough to guarantee prices for grain by countering the influence of banks, grain merchants and fertiliser companies. After his campaigning in country newspapers, the Victorian Wheat-growers' Association founded its first branch at Ultima in November 1928. When the Legislative Assembly seat of Swan Hill was vacated by Stewart's move into Federal politics in 1919, Francis Edward Old (1875-1950), who farmed in Ultima and married there September 1904, was elected unopposed as the Victorian Farmers' Union member. Subsequently, federal politician Alexander Wilson augmented the success of the (later Wheat and Woolgrowers') Association, and retired to a farm he had purchased in 1952 in Ultima.

The population grew to over 700 people by 1933. Ultima railway siding played a crucial role in receiving wheat, and silos were built in 1942, with a capacity of 1 million bushels in the 1950s. The area also saw the cultivation of oats and barley and the grazing of sheep and fat lambs for wool and meat. The town had various amenities like a golf course, a recreation reserve, a public hall, an Anglican church, a second Catholic church (built in 1964), shops, a hotel, a reservoir, and a school (8 pupils in 2014).

In 2003, the Ultima Progress Association attempted to boost town numbers by offering 12 blocks of land for sale at $1, on the condition that buyers began building within 12 months. Eleven of the blocks were sold as a result of this initiative.

== Education ==
Ultima Primary School, established in 1902, is on the corner of Cameron Street and O'Connor Street which are named for pioneers of the town. Children from the school debated the role of social media in children’s lives when invited in September 2016 to the floor of the Victorian Parliament with attendees from other schools from across the state. Enrolment has been declining, and from 2021 to 2023 has numbered two students with one full-time teaching principal and one part-time classroom teacher, supported by weekly visits of a local Mobile Resource Centre. As of 2023 it was one of about twenty schools with 10 or fewer students attending. The Age reports that possible 'destaffing' and closure risks the loss of further population and consequently, enterprises and facilities closing, with a 'ghost town' resulting. In 2023, the school had just two students enrolled.

== Sport ==
=== Football ===
Ultima Kangaroos

Names
- Full name: Ultima Football Netball Club
- Nickname: Kangaroos

Club details
- Colours: Blue White
- Competition: Golden Rivers Football League
- Premierships: 9 (1981, 1983, 1991, 1994, 1996, 2002, 2003, 2004, 2014, 2015)
- Ground: Ultima Recreation Reserve

The Ultima Kangaroos are an Australian rules football club which compete in the Golden Rivers Football League. Since joining the then Kerang and District Football League in 1979, the 'Roos have won 10 premierships, which makes them one of the league's most successful teams during that time.

=== Golf ===
Golfers play at the course of the Ultima Golf Club on Lake Boga Road.
