= Tyrrell Downs =

Tyrrell Downs Victoria
- Coordinates: 35°19′31″S 142°55′26″E
- Population: 9 (2021 census)
- Postcode(s): 3533
- LGA(s): Shire of Buloke
- State electorate(s): Mildura
- Federal division(s): Mallee
Localities around Tyrrell Downs:
Lake Tyrrell	Chinkapook	Chillingollah
Lake Tyrrell	Tyrrell Downs	Waitchie
Lake Tyrrell	Sea Lake	Tyrrell

Tyrrell Downs is a locality in the northern part of the Shire of Buloke, Victoria, Australia. The post office there opened in April 1898 and was closed on 1 July 1927.
