= Woorinen South =

- Town
- Coordinates: 35°17′S 143°26′E
- Country: Australia
- State: Victoria
- LGA: Rural City of Swan Hill
- Location: 350 km (220 mi) NW of Melbourne; 10 km (6.2 mi) S of Swan Hill

Government
  - State electorate: Murray Plains
  - Federal division: Mallee
- Elevation: 70 m (230 ft)

Population
  - Total: 404 (2021 census)
- Postcode: 3588
Localities around Woorinen South
Pira	Woorinen North	Woorinen
Bulga	Woorinen South	Murrawee
Swan Hill West	Swan Hill West	Swan Hill

Woorinen South is a town in Victoria, Australia. It is situated within the Rural City of Swan Hill within the Mallee region of north-west Victoria. At the 2021 census, Woorinen South had a population of 404. The town is located 350 kilometres (217 mi) north-west of Melbourne and 10 kilometres (6 mi) km north-west of the regional centre Swan Hill. The town contains a number of small businesses and is in the centre of a prosperous and diverse agricultural area which produces wine, stone fruit, vegetables, wool, and cereal crops. The town hosts the annual Vintage Steam Rally.

== History ==
The first European settlers arrived in the area in the late nineteenth century and began clearing the land of its Mallee Scrub and planted crops. In the early years there was very little infrastructure. Transport and crop production was achieved through horse power or bullock teams.

The Woorinen irrigation area was started largely as a soldier settlement following the end of World War I. The Woorinen Central School (No. 3945) opened for classes in 1917 at Reserve Road. Woorinen South Post Office opened on 11 August 1921. The Woorinen Soldiers Memorial Hall was constructed in 1923 at the corner of Chillingollah Road and North South Road. It was used as a meeting place for local people and was used for a number of years for RSL club meetings. The next school to open in the area was the Woorinen North School (No. 4148) at Monash Drive in 1925. The Woorinen South School (No. 4456) opened in 1930 in the Woorinen South township, which had gradually sprung up along Palmer Street on the north side of the Swan Hill to Piangil railway line which was finished in 1915.

Due to dwindling class numbers and the Victorian state government cost cutting, the Woorinen Central School and the Woorinen North School both closed at the end of 1993. At this time, the Woorinen South School changed its name to Woorinen District School to reflect its new status as the only school left open in the area. Post-primary aged students attend one of the secondary schools in nearby Swan Hill.

== Economy ==
Traditionally, the areas of Woorinen and Woorinen North have been irrigation districts with water piped from the Murray River (some 10 kilometres away) to vineyards to produce table grapes, wine grapes and sultanas. The areas around the Woorinen South township have traditionally been used for dry land farming for the production of wheat and barley crops using natural rainfall. Recent decades have seen the large scale expansion of stone fruit and vegetables in all of the Woorinen areas. Accommodating this has been the construction of a number of large fruit packing sheds throughout the wider Woorinen area.

Since the mid-1990s, vineyards have also seen a corresponding increase particularly Shiraz and Cabernet Sauvignon grape varieties. Grapes are now largely harvested by mechanical harvesters. The closest winery is Buller Wines, located in the adjacent district of Beverford.

In 2002, a new grain depot was opened on the railway line at Woorinen South for the storage of large amounts of grain from cereal crops in the area. It is operated by Australian Bulk Alliance. Grain from the storage is sent to the southern Victorian ports by rail for export and shipment abroad. Stone fruit, vegetables and grapes produced in the region are sent to national supermarket chains and some is exported to Asia.

In 2006 construction began on the Woorinen Ethanol plant located on the railway line slightly to the west of the Woorinen South township. It is to be Australia's first ethanol plant using locally grown corn, wheat and barley for the production of ethanol fuel. This plant will be the first major industrial complex in the Woorinen area.

== Sport ==
In 1919, the Woorinen Football club, an Australian rules football club, started in the Swan Hill Football Association with its first club colours being black and white. The club changed its colours to the current yellow and black colours in 1937. From 1946 Woorinen was part of the Mid Murray Football League. Woorinen Football Club has won a number of premierships over the years with its most recent in 1993 and 2002. The home ground is located at Reserve Road next to the former Woorinen Central School. Woorinen is one of the founding members of the Central Murray Football League which began in 1997. This league was formed out of the existing Mid Murray Football League which ceased to exist after the end of the 1996 season.

Woorinen Netball Club has operated for many years and games are played at the Woorinen Netball Courts next to the football oval. Game times and teams are the same as those of the Woorinen Football Club.

Woorinen also had a tennis club for many years in the Lake Boga and District Tennis Association. Home games were played at the Woorinen South tennis courts.
