= Waitchie =

Waitchie Victoria
- Coordinates: 35°22′S 143°06′E
- Population: 48 (2016 census)
- Postcode(s): 3544
- Location: 366 km (227 mi) from Melbourne; 44 km (27 mi) from Swan Hill; 107 km (66 mi) from Robinvale; 191 km (119 mi) from Mildura
- LGA(s): Rural City of Swan Hill
Localities around Waitchie:
Chillingollah	Polisbet	Nowie
Tyrrell Downs	Waitchie	Gowanford
Tyrrell	Springfield	Chinangin

Waitchie is a locality in Victoria, Australia, located approximately 44 km (27 mi) from Swan Hill, Victoria. At the 2006 census, Waitchie had a population of 118, decreasing to 48 at the 2016 census.

A Post Office opened here on 18 February 1914 and closed in 1977.
