= Woorinen =

- Town
- Coordinates: 35°16′54″S 143°27′56″E
- Country: Australia
- State: Victoria
- LGA: Rural City of Swan Hill

Government
  - State electorate: Murray Plains
  - Federal division: Mallee

Population
  - Total: 262 (2,021 census)
- Postcode: 3589
Localities around Woorinen
Woorinen North	Beverford	Beverford
Woorinen South	Woorinen	Tyntynder South
Woorinen South	Woorinen South	Woorinen South

Woorinen is a town in the Rural City of Swan Hill, Victoria, Australia. Woorinen R.S. post office opened on 1 February 1915, renamed Woorinen on 1 April 1919 and was closed on 24 September 1993.
