= Speed, Victoria =

Speed
- Town
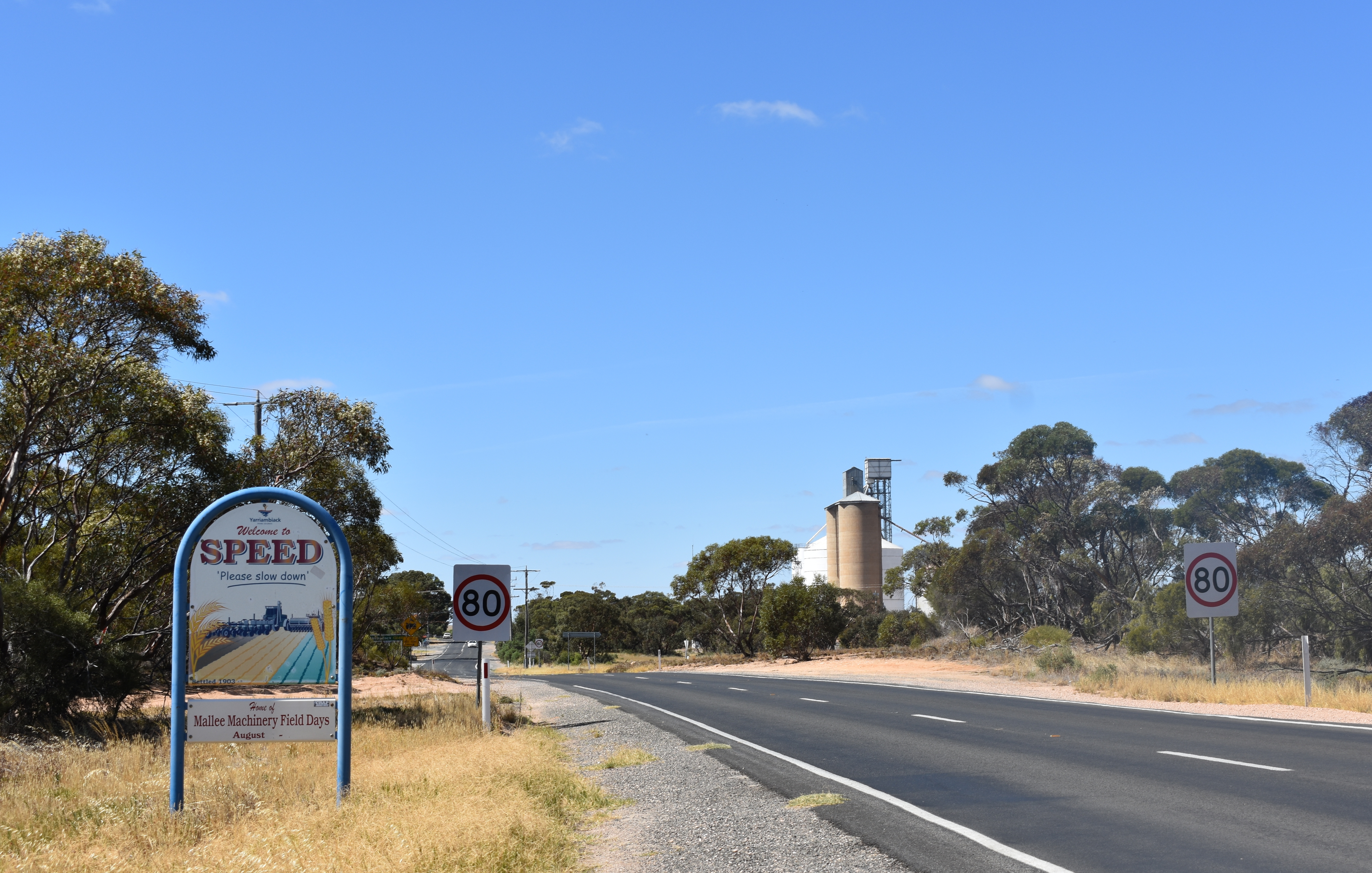
- Entering Speed from the north via the Sunraysia Highway, 2018. Note the sign reads "Welcome to Speed. Please slow down"

- Coordinates: 35°24′0″S 142°26′20″E
- Country: Australia
- State: Victoria
- LGA: Shire of Yarriambiack
- Location: 402 km (250 mi) from Melbourne; 143 km (89 mi) from Mildura; 39 km (24 mi) from Ouyen; 261 km (162 mi) from Bendigo

Government
  - State electorate: Mildura
  - Federal division: Mallee

Population
  - Total: 78 (2016 census)
- Postcode: 3488
- Mean max temp: 23.6 °C (74.5 °F)
- Mean min temp: 9.6 °C (49.3 °F)
- Annual rainfall: 333.8 mm (13.14 in)

Speed is a town in Victoria, Australia, located approximately 143 km from Mildura, Victoria, and about 410 km from Melbourne. Speed was named after William, Harold and Gordon Speed, who settled in the district in 1903. Settlement by the Speed brothers coincided with the opening of the railway line and the opening up of the Mallee lands for farm selection. The Speed township was surveyed in 1910.

The population at the 2016 census was 78.

Speed is the venue of the Mallee Machinery Field Days, first held in 1979. It is run over two days in August and has over 8,000 people attend. It is run by the Lions Club of Speed which has about 25 members. The event relies on volunteers from the district and has raised a great deal of money to go towards many different local, state and national charities and organisations. Speed Post Office opened on 1 October 1910.

Speed was once notable for the roadsigns on the highway each side of the town reading "WELCOME TO SPEED" but these have been replaced with council signs "Welcome to Speed – Where Time Ticks Faster." These signs also advertise the dates of the Speed Lions Club Machinery Field Days.

Golfers play at the course of the Speed Golf Club.

Speed State School (No. 3861) opened in 1913. It has since closed and has been sold into private ownership. Speed East State School (No. 4129) opened in October 1922 and closed in 1944, with the building being removed to Robinvale.

In January 2011, the residents of Speed started a safety campaign to get the name of the town to be renamed "SpeedKills" to raise awareness of the dangers of speeding. By mid-February 2011 the Facebook campaign had exceeded the designated 32,000 "likes" required to rename the town "SpeedKills". The outcome was to rename the town for one month, which it duly was. The name reverted back to Speed on 18 March 2011.
