= Sea Lake =

- Town
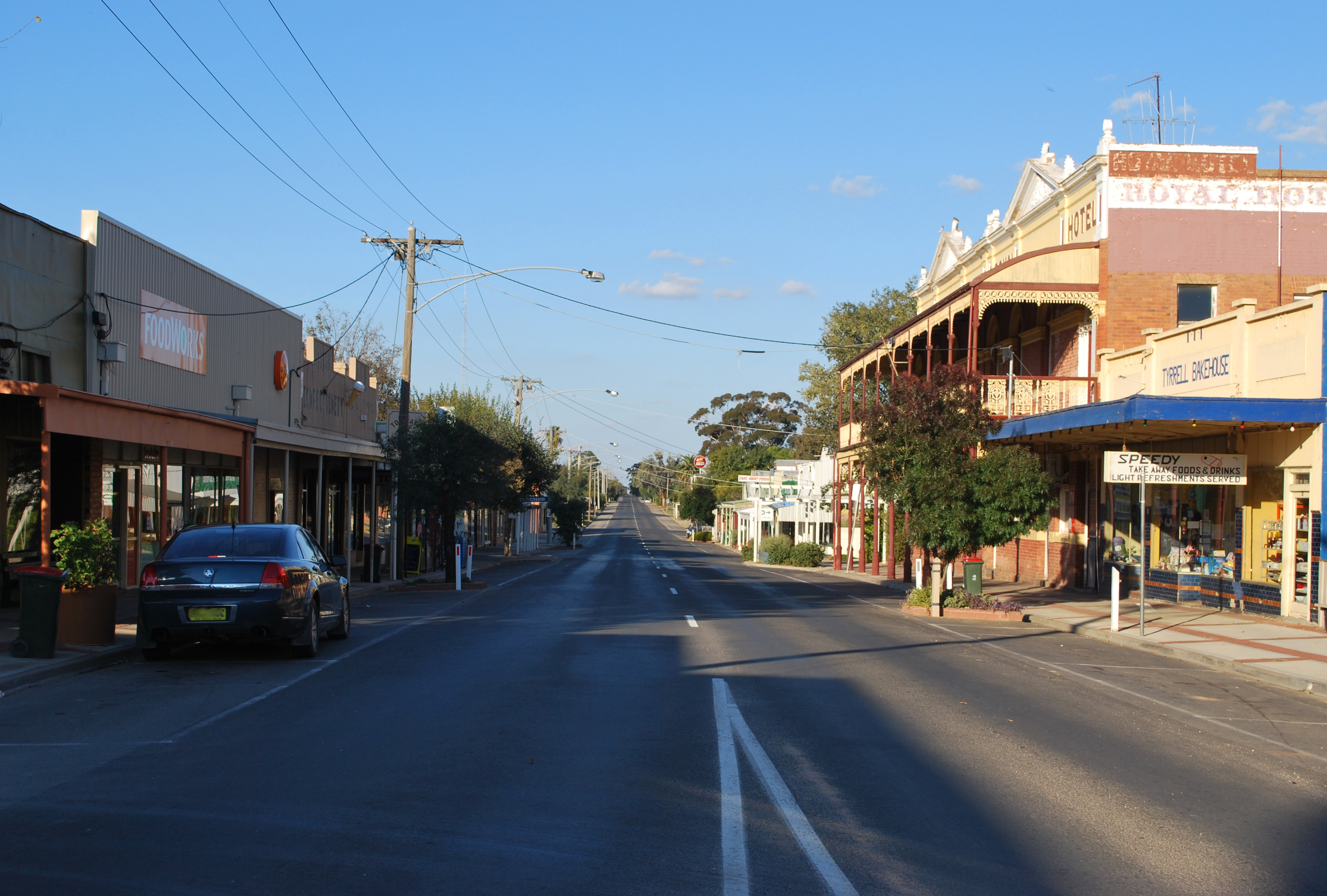
- Best St, the main street of Sea Lake

- Coordinates: 35°29′0″S 142°50′0″E
- Country: Australia
- State: Victoria
- LGA: Shire of Buloke
- Location: 351 km (218 mi) NW of Melbourne; 73 km (45 mi) W of Swan Hill

Government
  - State electorate: Mildura
  - Federal division: Mallee
- Elevation: 59 m (194 ft)

Population
  - Total: 619 (2021 census)
- Postcode: 3533
Localities around Sea Lake
Ninda, Lake Tyrrell	Tyrrell Downs	Tyrrell
Myall	Sea Lake	Springfield
Banyan	Boigbeat	Boigbeat

Sea Lake is a town in the Mallee district of north-west Victoria, Australia and is situated on the southern shores of Lake Tyrrell. The town is located on the Calder Highway, 351 kilometres (218 mi) north-west of Melbourne, and 73 kilometres (45 mi) west of Swan Hill. Sea Lake is in the heart of Australia's wheat belt, and is the main township for a number of wheat farms in the region. At the 2021 census, Sea Lake had a population of 619.

== History ==
The site upon which Sea Lake is situated was first visited by colonists in 1838. Sea Lake may have been given its name by an early settler, Edward Eyre, from the Port Phillip area. Purportedly, the sea-like appearance of Lake Tyrrell inspired Eyre. An alternative version of the naming of Sea Lake comes from a surveyors report of the time when planning the township (which lies to the south of Lake Tyrrell). It is purported that a surveyor mistook a mark on hand drawings "see lake" which had been used by the author of the drawings to mark a landmark.

Lake Tyrrell is the largest salt lake in Victoria, covering approximately 80 square miles (210 km^{2}). Much of the time, Lake Tyrrell is dry. However, the lake is occasionally fed by Tyrrell Creek. There is a salt extraction plant located in Sea Lake, processing the lake's salt deposits.

A community was established after the arrival of the Kulwin railway line in 1893. The post office opened on 2 October 1895.

The Sea Lake Magistrates' Court closed on 1 January 1983.

Sea Lake has a rich grain farming history and one of the first recorded stations in the area is Tyrrell Downs.

The "Sea Lake", a body of fresh water south of Lake Tyrrell, was described in 1893 as "an assured and ample water supply" for the proposed Wycheproof to Mildura Railway. It supplied the town and surrounding farms which grew up around it, but in poor seasons it dried up. Alternate water was arranged, and the golf course now occupies the former Sea Lake.

== Local interest ==
Sea Lake is located in fairly close proximity to several major national parks, including Wyperfeld National Park and Hattah-Kulkyne National Park. The town of Sea Lake is known for its once-yearly rally car race called the Mallee Rally, held on the Queens Birthday holiday in June and for its silo art. Sea Lake's local newspaper is known as the Sea Lake and Wycheproof Times Ensign, originating in 1897.

With its neighbouring townships Culgoa, Berriwillock and Nandaly, Sea Lake has football and netball teams (Sea Lake Nandaly Tigers) competing in the North Central Football League.

Golfers play at the course of the Sea Lake Golf Club.

The township has one hotel, the Royal Hotel (locally known as the Top Pub) and two motels: Lake Tyrrell Accommodation and the Thistledome Motel. A visitors centre is located on Main Street.

At least two local footballers have played at VFL/AFL level. Geoff McMillan (Nandaly) played for Richmond in 1978–79 and Greg Daniels (Sea Lake) played for Collingwood in 1986.

To the south of Sea Lake (some 10 kilometres (6.2 mi)) lies the fresh water lake - Green Lake. This lake has served the surrounding communities well over the years for water sports recreation and as a holiday retreat. The lake was at its hey day in the 70s particularly when many speed boats and families spent hot summers at the lake. The lake is part of a natural depression and is fed by water by channel. It was dry for many years but around 2009 it was refilled.

Sea Lake also has a Cricket side with the neighbouring town Woomelang forming the Sea Lake Woomelang Cricket Club.

== Flora, fauna, and environment ==
The Mallee fowl is found in Sea Lake. The region has been suffering from the effects of a long running drought now for many years.
