= Swan Hill =

City in Victoria, Australia

- City
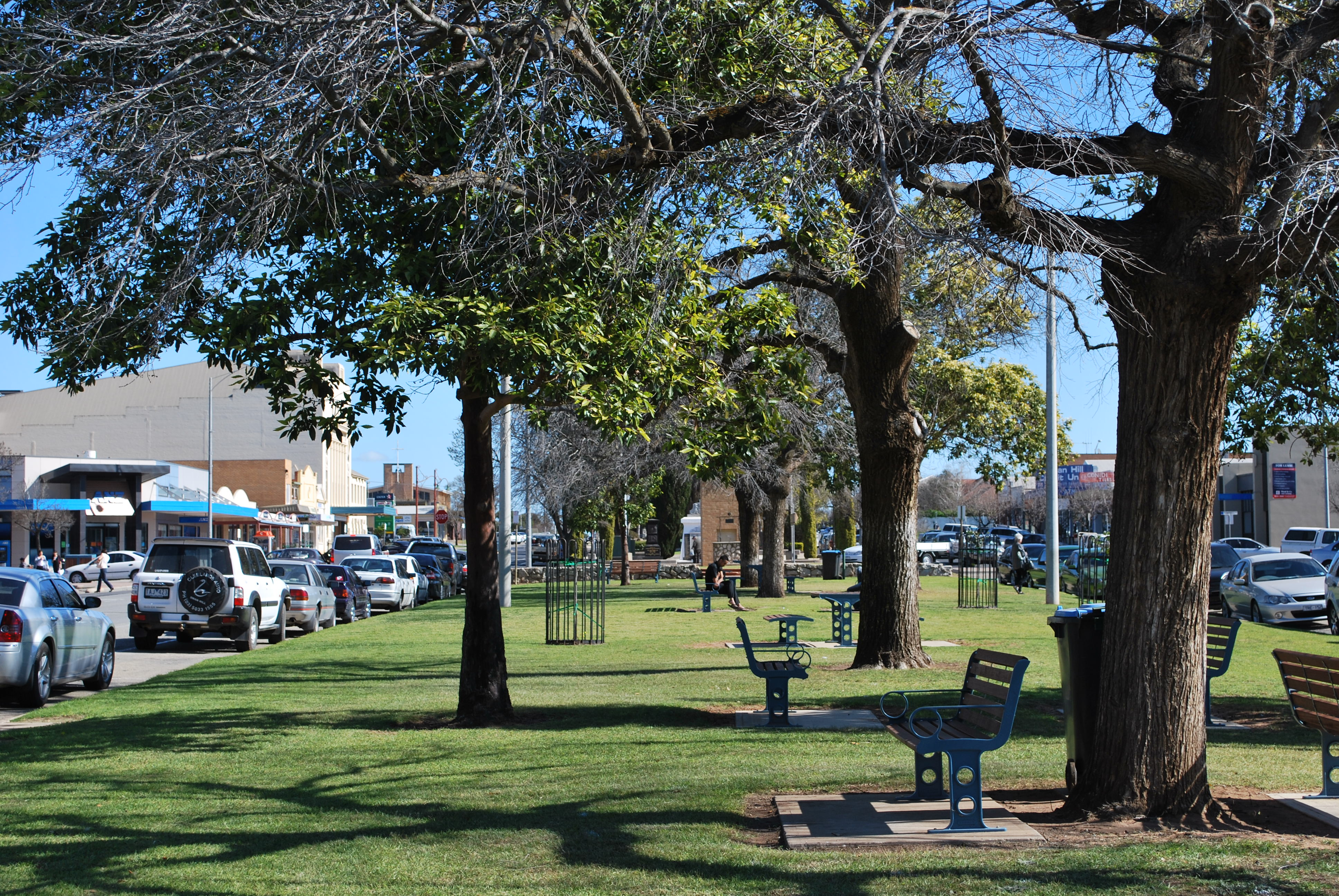
- A park in central Swan Hill

- Coordinates: 35°20′0″S 143°33′0″E
- Country: Australia
- State: Victoria
- LGA: Rural City of Swan Hill
- Location: 338 km (210 mi) NW of Melbourne; 155 km (96 mi) from Echuca; 188 km (117 mi) NW of Bendigo; 214 km (133 mi) from Mildura; 225 km (140 mi) from Horsham
- Established: 1846

Government
  - State electorate: Murray Plains
  - Federal division: Mallee
- Elevation: 70 m (230 ft)

Population
  - Total: 11,508 (2021 census)
- Postcode: 3585
- Mean max temp: 23.9 °C (75.0 °F)
- Mean min temp: 9.4 °C (48.9 °F)
- Annual rainfall: 310.3 mm (12.22 in)
Localities around Swan Hill
Woorinen South	Tyntynder South, Murrawee	Murraydale
Swan Hill West	Swan Hill	New South Wales
Goschen	Castle Donnington	Pental Island

Swan Hill is a city in the northwest of Victoria, Australia on the Murray Valley Highway and on the south bank of the Murray River, downstream from the junction of the Loddon River. At the 2021 census, Swan Hill had a population of 11,508.

== History ==
The area was given its current name by explorer Thomas Mitchell, while camping beside a hill on 21 June 1836.

Among the reeds on the point of ground between the two rivers was a shallow lagoon where swans and other wild fowl so abounded that, although half a mile from our camp, their noise disturbed us through the night. I therefore named this somewhat remarkable and isolated feature Swan Hill, a point which may probably be found to mark the junction of two fine streams.

— Thomas Mitchell

The European community grew up around a punt river crossing, which was established as early as 1846. This crossing serviced the growing agricultural area, and was the only river crossing for 100 km. The post office opened here on 1 February 1849.

In 1853 Francis Cadell navigated the Murray River from its mouth in South Australia to Swan Hill in his paddle steamer, Lady Augusta. He arrived on 17 September 1853, narrowly beating William Randell of Mannum, who arrived 4 hours later in PS Mary Ann. This demonstrated the feasibility of river traffic, which flourished until the introduction of the railway.

In 1876 Swan Hill was described in the following terms:

Swan-hill is a small, and, notwithstanding its 20 or 25 years of existence, not very flourishing, township… The population does not exceed 100 persons, but the township can boast of a substantial post and telegraph office, which is the principal building in the place. There is a church built of brick, belonging to the Church of England, and a small wooden chapel owned by some other denomination. The hospital, for Swan-hill can also boast of a hospital, is prettily situated at the junction of the Little Murray with the main stream. The district around the town is principally pastoral. About 10 or 12 miles distant there is a salt lake, from which a coarse salt is obtained and exported to Riverina and the Upper Murray. There is a mail three times a week, and the township is already connected with the metropolis by telegraph.

— The Argus

In 1883 the first of several red brick water towers was built to supply the growing town with water. Water was pumped out of the river and into the top of the tower by a wood-fired steam engine, and then flowed by gravity to surrounding businesses and private residences. Many of these towers can still be seen around town.

The railway from Bendigo was extended from Kerang to Swan Hill station in May 1890, being extended to Piangil in 1915.

The punt river crossing was replaced by a timber truss, steel lift span bridge in 1896.

The first six telephones were connected in Swan Hill on 2 October 1911. The National Bank was phone number 1.

In 1914 Isaburo (Jo) Takasuka produced the first commercial rice crop in Australia. He grew Japanese (Japonica) varieties on 80 hectares (200 acres) of flood prone land on the Murray River near Swan Hill. The Chinese had been growing rice in Australia since at least 1877.

Swan Hill became a city in 1965.

=== Burke and Wills ===
The Burke and Wills expedition reached Swan Hill on Thursday, 6 September 1860 on their journey across Australia from Melbourne to the Gulf of Carpentaria. They made Camp XV (their fifteenth camp out of Melbourne) in the police paddock on the banks of the Murray River in an area that is now Riverside Park. The expedition stayed in Swan Hill until Monday, 10 September while they reorganised the stores. Burke dismissed four men: Essau Khan, Brooks, Lane and John Polongeaux. He then hired Alexander McPherson, a saddler from Epsom and Charlie Gray, a former sailor from Scotland who had worked as an ostler for Cobb and Co between Bendigo and Swan Hill and who was now employed at the Lower Murray Inn in Swan Hill. The party was strengthened further by the arrival from Melbourne of journalist William Hodgkinson, and scientist Georg von Neumayer. The local inhabitants gave the expedition a rousing farewell as they crossed into New South Wales. Folklore alleges Burke and Wills planted a Moreton Bay fig tree in the garden of the local doctor, B W Gummow. The tree is now approximately 27 metres high and has a branch spread of approximately 44 metres and can be seen in Curlewis Street.

== Heritage listings ==
The Murray River road bridge over the Murray River connects McCallum Street in Swan Hill to the Swan Hill Road in Murray Downs in New South Wales. The bridge is listed on the New South Wales State Heritage Register.

== Indigenous people ==
In Dreamtime myths, Totyerguil (from the area now known as Swan Hill) ran out of spears while chasing Otchtout the cod. This chase is part of the mythology of the creation of the Murray River. Based on evidence from Coobool Creek and Kow Swamp, it appears that Aboriginal people have lived in the area for the last 13,000–9,000 years.

The area is inhabited by the Wemba-Wemba (or Wamba-Wamba), Latji Latji, Tatti Tatti, Waddi Waddi and Barapa Barapa people. Swan Hill was called "Matakupaat" or "place of the platypus" by the Wemba Wamba people. Their language is the Wemba Wemba language, and the sub dialect is Bura Bura. At the time of the 2021 census, 4.5% of people in Swan Hill identified as Indigenous. The average for Victoria is 1% and Australia overall is 3.2%.

== Geography ==
The town is situated on the Northern Plains Grassland.

=== Viticulture ===
Swan Hill gives its name to a wine region straddling the Murray River. The vines are predominantly irrigated from the river.

=== Climate ===
Swan Hill has a cold semi-arid climate (BSk) with hot sunny summers and cool, partly cloudy winters. Afternoon dew points are extremely low in the warmer months, particularly from October to December, due in part to the frequency of dry cold fronts out of the south-west.

Climate data for Swan Hill Aerodrome (1996–2023); 71 m AMSL; 35.38° S, 143.54° E
Month	Jan	Feb	Mar	Apr	May	Jun	Jul	Aug	Sep	Oct	Nov	Dec	Year
Record high °C (°F)	47.7 (117.9)	46.9 (116.4)	42.0 (107.6)	39.0 (102.2)	29.0 (84.2)	25.0 (77.0)	25.7 (78.3)	27.8 (82.0)	36.3 (97.3)	38.4 (101.1)	45.2 (113.4)	46.9 (116.4)	47.7 (117.9)
Mean daily maximum °C (°F)	33.3 (91.9)	32.2 (90.0)	28.6 (83.5)	23.8 (74.8)	18.7 (65.7)	15.3 (59.5)	14.8 (58.6)	16.7 (62.1)	20.4 (68.7)	24.2 (75.6)	28.1 (82.6)	30.7 (87.3)	23.9 (75.0)
Mean daily minimum °C (°F)	16.3 (61.3)	15.9 (60.6)	13.0 (55.4)	9.3 (48.7)	6.4 (43.5)	4.4 (39.9)	3.6 (38.5)	4.0 (39.2)	5.8 (42.4)	8.1 (46.6)	11.7 (53.1)	13.8 (56.8)	9.4 (48.9)
Record low °C (°F)	6.0 (42.8)	5.5 (41.9)	4.1 (39.4)	−0.3 (31.5)	−2.2 (28.0)	−5.0 (23.0)	−5.2 (22.6)	−3.7 (25.3)	−2.0 (28.4)	−1.0 (30.2)	1.0 (33.8)	5.0 (41.0)	−5.2 (22.6)
Average precipitation mm (inches)	25.6 (1.01)	18.4 (0.72)	16.6 (0.65)	24.3 (0.96)	25.5 (1.00)	26.1 (1.03)	25.7 (1.01)	27.4 (1.08)	27.8 (1.09)	28.0 (1.10)	43.5 (1.71)	21.3 (0.84)	310.3 (12.22)
Average precipitation days (≥ 0.2 mm)	4.3	3.2	3.7	4.8	8.0	10.9	13.2	10.9	7.9	6.6	6.6	4.9	85.0
Average afternoon relative humidity (%)	23	26	29	33	46	56	55	45	40	29	27	24	36
Average dew point °C (°F)	4.7 (40.5)	6.4 (43.5)	5.4 (41.7)	4.5 (40.1)	5.4 (41.7)	5.5 (41.9)	4.4 (39.9)	3.1 (37.6)	3.5 (38.3)	1.2 (34.2)	2.7 (36.9)	2.9 (37.2)	4.1 (39.5)
Source: Bureau of Meteorology

== Demography ==
Largest ancestries (2011)	Percent
Australians (Australia)	31.3%
English (England)	30.1%
Irish (Republic of Ireland)	9.9%
Scottish (Scotland)	7.7%
Italian (Italy)	4.4%

Around 88% of the people living in Swan Hill were born in Australia. Migrants account for around 12 per cent, these include Italy (1.4%); England (1.0%); New Zealand (0.4%); Scotland (0.3%) and Afghanistan (0.3%). 3.2% of the population are Indigenous.

== Facilities ==
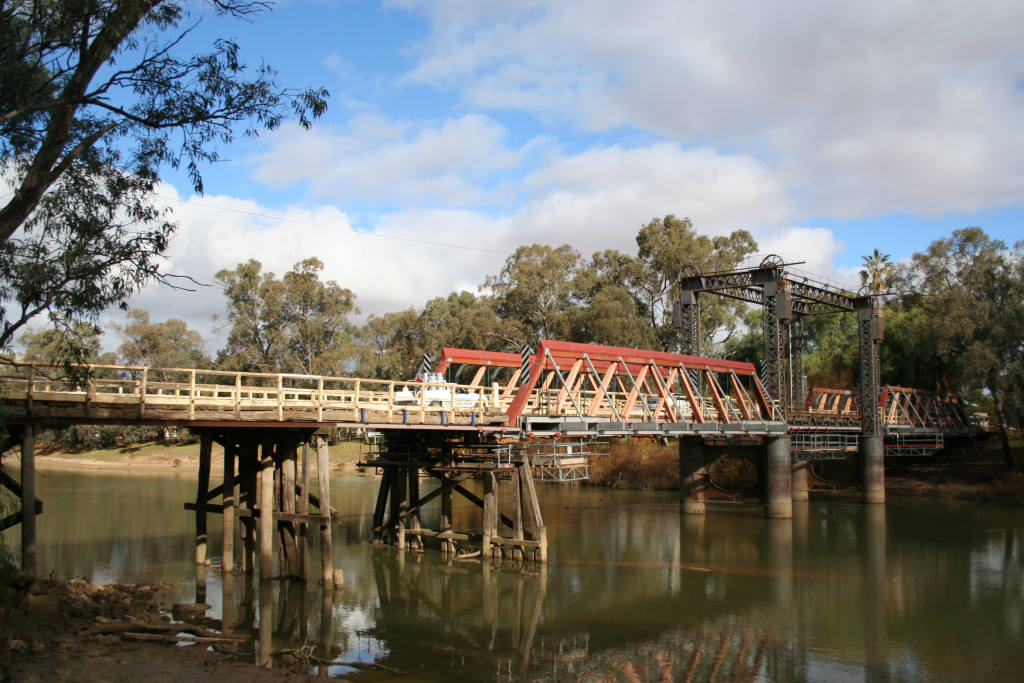
Bridge over the Murray River

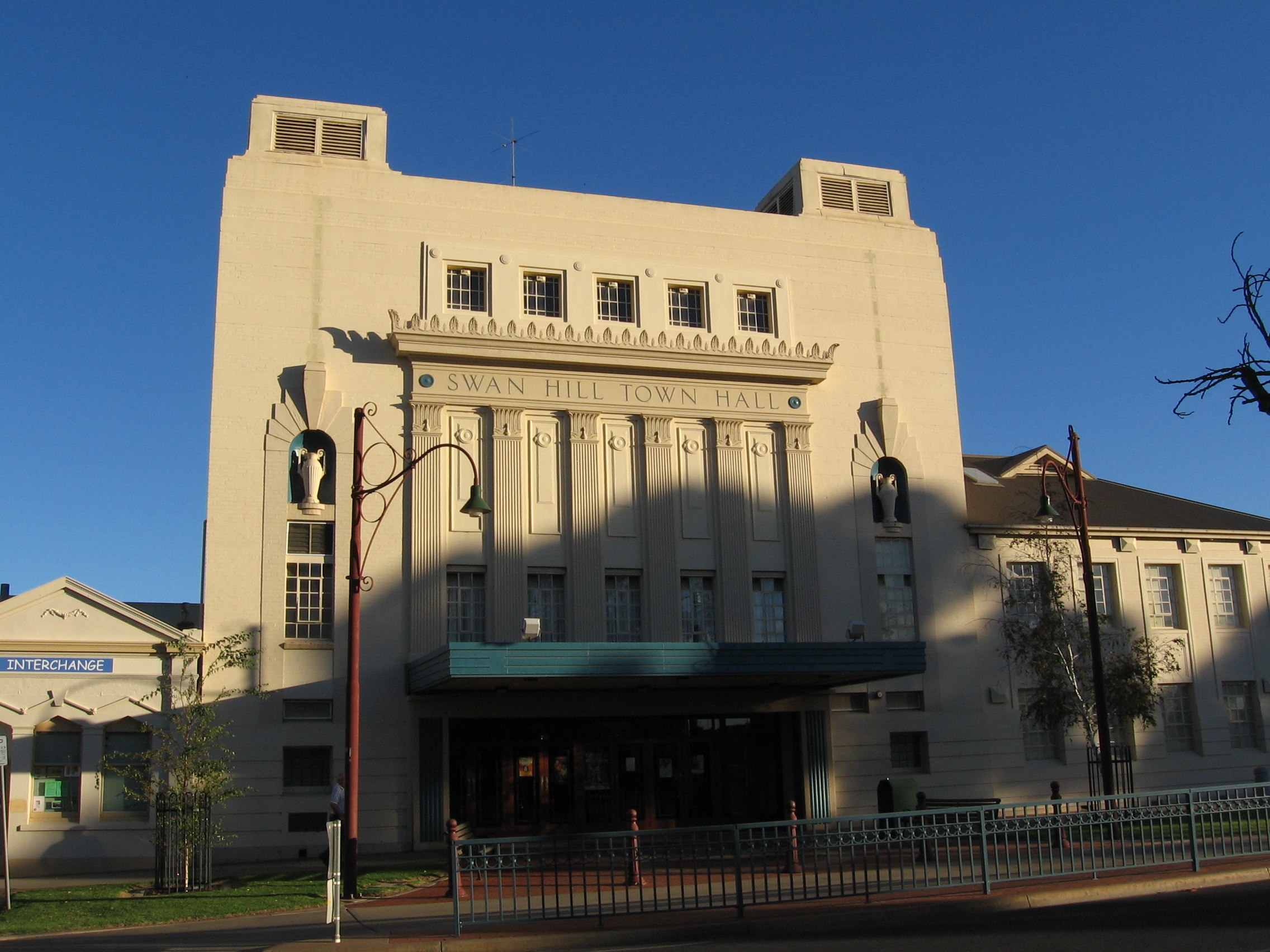
Town Hall

=== Education ===
In Swan Hill there are four primary schools, two secondary schools, and three schools that run both primary and secondary syllabuses. These are Swan Hill College, MacKillop College, St Mary's Primary School, Swan Hill Primary School, Swan Hill North Primary School, Son Centre Christian School, Victorian P–12 College of Koorie Education – Payika Campus and Swan Hill Specialist School. Swan Hill College is well known for its anti-drug program.

Tertiary education is delivered by Sunraysia Institute of TAFE. Its main campus is at Tower Hill, and it runs a farm north of the city. As well as its own courses, it offers a Deakin University program.

The Country Universities Centre has, as of 2023, established a study centre in Swan Hill, and assists around 200 students with attaining a university degree in their local community.

The Victoria P–12 College of Koorie Education – Payika Campus is now actually a Flo Program, linked to Swan Hill College.

=== Sport ===
Swan Hill is the heart of the Central Murray Football League. It is also the home to two football clubs, the Swan Hill "Swans" and the Tyntynder "Bulldogs".

Swan Hill also has Futsal Swan Hill providing senior futsal competition in Swan Hill, both men's and women's leagues, two men's divisions and one women's division. Established in 1995, the competition regularly features over 30 teams each season. The Swan Hill Junior Soccer League that consists of over 500 children. They also field three teams in the Bendigo Amateur Soccer League, where their Senior Men's Division 2 team won the Knock-Out Cup in 2006. The Youth Team was runner-up in the Knock-Out Cup competition in both 2006 and 2008. The Senior Women's team was runner-up in 2008.

Swan Hill has a horse racing club, the Swan Hill Jockey Club, which schedules around ten race meetings a year including the Swan Hill Cup meeting in June. The Swan Hill St Patricks Race Club also holds a meeting at the racecourse in October.

Golfers play at the course of the Murray Downs Golf Club on Moulamein Road.

Swan Hill also has junior and senior badminton games in winter at the stadium every Tuesday night. Also held at the stadium, junior and senior basketball games are hosted all year round, divided into a summer and winter competition. Games happen everyday and each day is a different age range.

=== Transport ===
The city is located on the Murray Valley Highway (B400), which links it to Echuca and Albury–Wodonga to the east and Mildura in the west; the Loddon Valley Highway (B260) links Swan Hill to Bendigo to the south. V/Line operates passenger rail services on the Swan Hill line, with the local railway station being the terminus. The Swan Hill Airport is also nearby. However, there are no scheduled passenger flights to and from the airport. The nearest passenger airport is Mildura Airport, located 226 km (140 mi) north west of Swan Hill. The city also has its own public bus network.

=== Media ===
Swan Hill has one locally produced newspaper, The Swan Hill Guardian, which has been circulated in Swan Hill and surrounding regions for almost 120 years. In addition to this, there are four local radio stations: 99.1 Smart FM (3SFM); ABC Mildura Swan Hill (3MIL); 107.7 Mixx FM (3SHI) and AM station 1332 3SH. Swan Hill's television stations are identical to Bendigo's: ABC, Seven, WIN, Network 10 and SBS.

== Residents ==
- Author James Aldridge grew up in Swan Hill. He described Swan Hill during the Great Depression of the 1930s in his series of "St Helen" novels.
- Radio and television broadcaster Arch McKirdy was born and grew up in Swan Hill.
- Television and radio presenter Yumi Stynes was born and grew up in Swan Hill, Victoria.
- Artist Lorraine Connelly-Northey was born in Swan Hill.
