= Nyah Football Club =

Australian rules football team

Nyah

Names
- Full name: Nyah Football Club
- Nickname(s): Bohemians, Bears

Club details
- Founded: as early as 1899
- Dissolved: 1977
- Colours: Blue Yellow
- Competition: Murray River Association 1910-13, Nyah District FA 1914, Nyah-Piangil District FA 1920-31, Mid-Murray Football League 1932-38, Northern Districts FL 1939, Mid-Murray Football League 1940-77 (now CMFL)
- Premierships: 1914, 1918, 1936, 1937, 1938, 1946, 1948, 1963
- Former ground(s): Nyah Recreation Reserve, Nyah
- Guernsey

The Nyah Football Club was a country Australian rules football team from the small Victorian town of Nyah. The team competed in a number of leagues before staying in the Mid-Murray Football League every year from 1932 to 1977 apart from 1939 in which they competed in the Northern Districts FL. In 1978, the Nyah Football Club merged with the Nyah West Football Club to form the Nyah-Nyah West United Football Club.

== History ==
The Nyah Football Club first joined a local league with other teams from Lalbert, Lake Boga, and Swan Hill in 1899. Known then as the 'Bohemians', they competed against the other teams in both home and away matches.

In 1901 Nyah played in a league consisting of Lake Boga, Goschen, Swan Hill and themselves, coming last with a total of one win of nine matches for the season. At the end of the season, a match was played between two teams: the combined Swan Hill and Nyah against Lake Boga and Goschen. During this match a collection was taken up in aid of the local hospital.

From 1910 to 1913, Nyah played in a league that went by many names, mainly the Murray River Football Association but occasionally the Wood Wood District Football Association or the River Murray Association. In 1914 they competed in the first and only season of the Nyah & District Association against Tyntynder West, Wood Wood, and Piangil. The team was captained by R J O'Connor. In 1915, the Nyah Football Association (as the league was now known) was disbanded due to WWI. The teams, to some controversy, decided to play some matches when possible to raise money for the Red Cross in aid of those at war. Similar arrangements continued in the following years, such as Nyah playing Wood Wood in July 1916 in aid of the Swan Hill Hospital, Nyah playing Wood Wood in June 1917 in aid of the State School Patriotic Fund, and Nyah playing Yarraby in two home and away matches in September 1917.

In 1918 Nyah began a new private association with Nyah West, taking in turns to play at either's home ground. Collections were made at each match in aid of the Nyah Returned Services. After playing Wood Wood in June of the same year, rumors aroused of a new league opening in the area. The following month, a new football league featuring Nyah, Nyah West and Wood Wood started competing with the intent of 'augment[ing] local patriotic funds'. At the end of the season, Nyah played Nyah West for the Premiership, prevailing by 20 points.

Nyah did compete in 1922 in the Nyah and Piangil Football Association, however did not competing in 1924 in the Piangil and District Association. in 1925, Nyah joined Nyah West, Piangil, Woorinen and Yarraby to play in the Nyah-Piangil Football Association. Nyah remained in this league (which became known as the Mid-Murray Football League in 1934) until it went into recess during 1939, during which Nyah played in the Northern District Football Association for its first and only year. The following year play in the Mid-Murray Football League resumed, with play continuing until the 1942-44 recess due to WWII. Football began again in 1945, and the following year Nyah defeated Woorinen by 17 points to claim the premiership. Nyah were again premiers in 1948, this time defeating Tyntynder by 4 points for the flag.

Nyah continued in the Mid-Murray Football League for the remainder of its existence, competing in six grand finals and winning one in 1963 (defeating Lalbert by 5 points). Nyah's final year was in 1977, and in 1978 the club merged with Nyah West to create the Nyah-Nyah West United Demons who competed in the Mid-Murray football league (and later the Central Murray Football League) from the 1978 season onward. The blue of the Nyah jumpers and the red from the sash of the Nyah West jumpers were combined to create a jumper that was easily purchasable (the same jumper was worn by the Melbourne Football Club at the time).

== Premierships ==
League	Total flags	Premiership years
Nyah & District FA	1	1914
Unknown League	1	1918
Mid Murray FA	3	1936, 1937, 1938
Mid-Murray Football League	3	1946, 1948, 1963
