= Balranald Football Club =

Balranald

Names
- Full name: Balranald Football Netball Club Inc
- Nickname: Kangaroos

Club details
- Founded: 1887; 139 years ago
- Colours
- Competition: CMFNL
- Premierships: 1924, 1925, 1930, 1948, 1953, 1954, 1989, 1990, 1994, 2006, 2009
- Ground: Greenham Park, Balranald

Uniforms
Home

The Balranald Football Club are an Australian football club competing in the Central Murray Football League. The club is based in the town of Balranald in the Riverina region of New South Wales. The club was founded in 1887 and their home ground is called Greenham Park.

An early report of a match between the Balranald Football Club and the Mechanics Institute occurred in 1887. The club, because of its isolation spend a lot of time playing scratch matches amongst themselves. As was the nature of the time the club secretary would write to other clubs in a bid to organise a game of football.

After reforming after the WW2, the club played invitational games against towns outside its district. This continued until 1948 when it entered the Northern Murray Valley Football League that included 3 clubs around Robinvale. Improvement of the road system allowed the club to travel further and safer to other towns.

In 1955 the club was admitted into the Mid Murray FL. In its second year it made the finals and two years later the club won its first final.

== Premierships ==
- Balranald-Moulamein Football Association
  - 1924, 1925
- Kyalite Football Association
  - 1930
- Northern Murray Valley FL
  - 1948, 1953, 1954
- Mid Murray FL
  - 1989, 1990, 1994
- Central Murray FL
  - 2006 and 2009

== VFL/AFL Players ==
Former VFL players that had played for the club include

- Nathan Ablett (AFL Geel)
- Lindsay Gilbee (AFL WBD)
- Jim Jess - Richmond
- Mark Lee - Richmond
- Ron Andrews - Essendon, Collingwood
- Jeff Fehring - Geelong, St Kilda
- David Simpson - Richmond
- Peter Laughlin - Richmond
- Merv Neagle - Essendon, Sydney
