= Shire of Cohuna =

Coordinates: 35°48′S 144°12′E

- Local government area
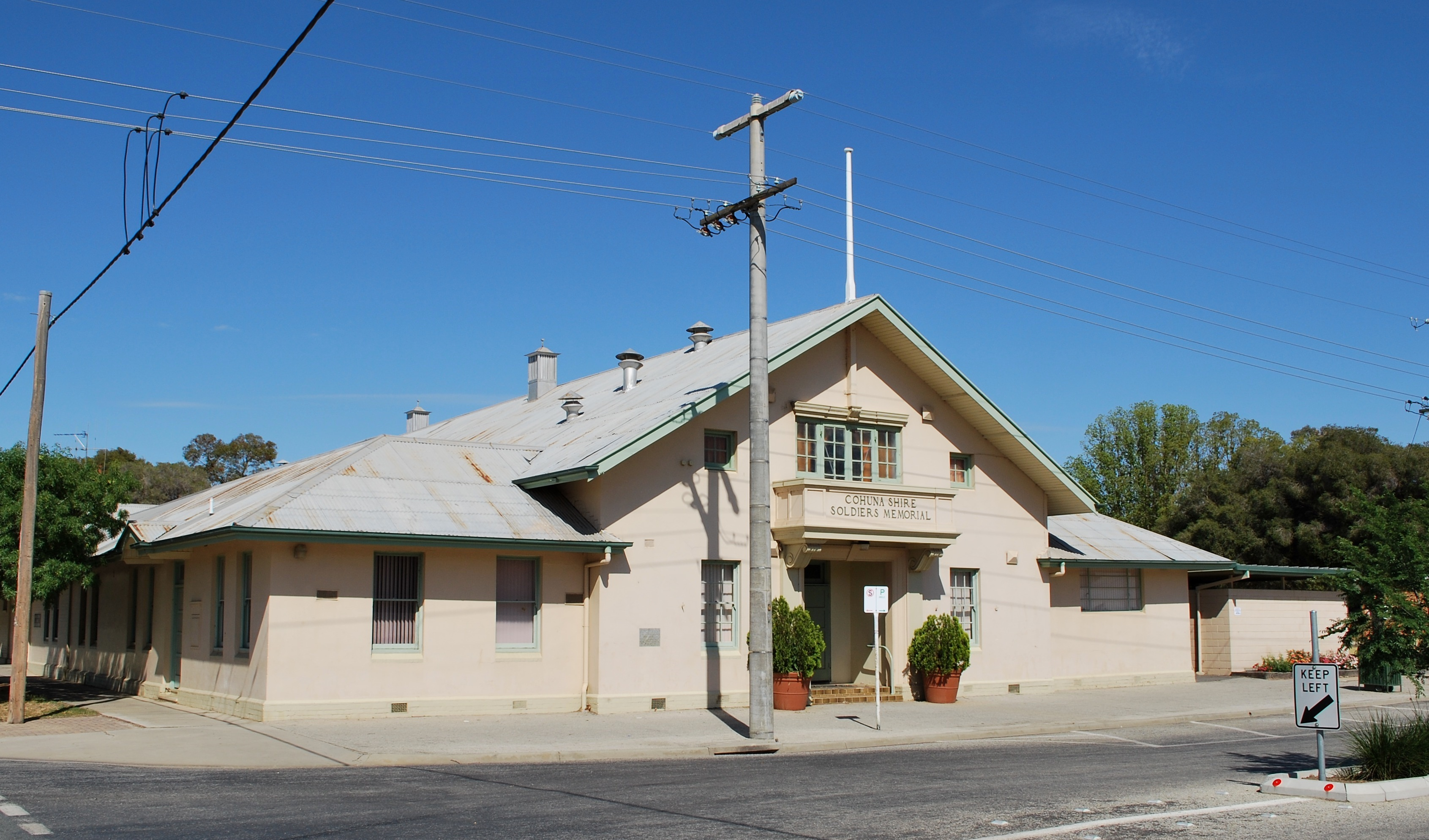
- Cohuna Shire Memorial Hall

- The extent of the Shire of Cohuna
- Country: Australia
- State: Victoria
- Region: Mallee
- Established: 1922
- Council seat: Cohuna

Area
  - Total: 494.69 km^{2} (191.00 sq mi)

Population
  - Total: 4,630 (1992)
  - Density: 9.359/km^{2} (24.241/sq mi)
- County: Gunbower
LGAs around Shire of Cohuna
Kerang	Wakool (NSW)	Wakool (NSW)
Kerang	Shire of Cohuna	Murray (NSW)
Gordon	Gordon	Rochester

The Shire of Cohuna was a local government area on the Murray River, about 265 kilometres (165 mi) north-northwest of Melbourne, the state capital of Victoria, Australia. The shire covered an area of 494.69 square kilometres (191.0 sq mi), and existed from 1922 until 1995.

== History ==
Cohuna was originally part of the Swan Hill Road District, which initially covered most of north-western Victoria. Swan Hill was incorporated on 8 July 1862, and became a shire on 14 August 1871. It was renamed the Shire of Kerang on 31 December 1898.

On 8 March 1922, parts of the North East and South East Ridings were severed and incorporated as the Shire of Cohuna.

In late 1994, as the State Government's local government reform program reached Victoria's north-west, the Shire of Cohuna sought amalgamation with neighbouring dairy farming-focused municipalities, whether eastwards (towards Echuca and Rochester) or southwards (spanning from the Loddon River to Torrumbarry). However, the Local Government Board was keen to create new shires with a diverse economic base; it proposed a new "Shire of Illoura", later altered to "Gannawarra", that combined the dryland grain cropping regions west of Kerang with the irrigated areas to the east.

On 20 January 1995, the Shire of Cohuna was abolished, and along with the Borough of Kerang and the Shire of Kerang, was merged into the newly created Shire of Gannawarra.

== Wards ==
The Shire of Cohuna was divided into three wards, each of which elected three councillors:

- Central Ward
- East Ward
- West Ward

== Towns and localities ==
- Cohuna*
- Gannawarra
- Gunbower
- Leitchville
- Mead
- McMillans

* Council seat.

== Population ==
Year	Population
1954	3,872
1958	4,190*
1961	4,435
1966	4,664
1971	4,768
1976	4,607
1981	4,505
1986	4,332
1991	4,312

* Estimate in the 1958 Victorian Year Book.
