= Disappearance of Krystal Fraser =

Unsolved 2009 disappearance of 23-year-old from Victoria

Krystal Fraser
- Born: Krystal Lee Fraser; Victoria, Australia
- Disappeared: 20 June 2009 (aged 22–23); Pyramid Hill, Victoria, Australia
- Status: Missing for 17 years, 4 months and 28 days
- Known for: Disappearance under suspicious circumstances
- Height: 167 cm (5 ft 6 in)

On 20 June 2009, 23-year-old Krystal Lee Fraser disappeared from Pyramid Hill, a town in north central Victoria, Australia, days before she was due to give birth to her son. Fraser, who had an intellectual disability, was last seen leaving an Albert Street address after visiting an acquaintance, having earlier discharged herself from hospital against medical advice. Investigators established that she had travelled to Pyramid Hill by V/Line train from Bendigo, and her mobile phone activity placed her in nearby Leitchville in the hours following her disappearance.

Police suspect Fraser was murdered, possibly in connection with a private relationship and her pregnancy, but her body has never been recovered. At a coronial inquest in 2022, Coroner Katherine Lorenz concluded that Fraser likely died shortly after receiving a call from a public phone box in Leitchville and found that available evidence supported the conclusion that Peter "PJ" Jenkinson was involved in her disappearance in some way.

== Background ==
Krystal Fraser grew up in northern Victoria, Australia. She experienced developmental delays from childhood, including epileptic seizures and impaired vision beginning around the age of eight, as well as difficulties with short-term memory. Her parents reported that she possessed an exceptionally strong long-term memory and was socially outgoing, though she often missed social cues and could be overly trusting of strangers. Fraser was sometimes over-friendly, and often sought attention from anyone who would give it. She frequently wandered the town, visited homes, and rode V/Line trains up and down the region, where she was well known to Pyramid railway station staff and commuters. Fraser had a mental age of approximately 14 despite being 23 years old. She could talk, read, and write, had completed high school, and was able to work and live independently, though hygiene and daily routines could sometimes be a challenge.

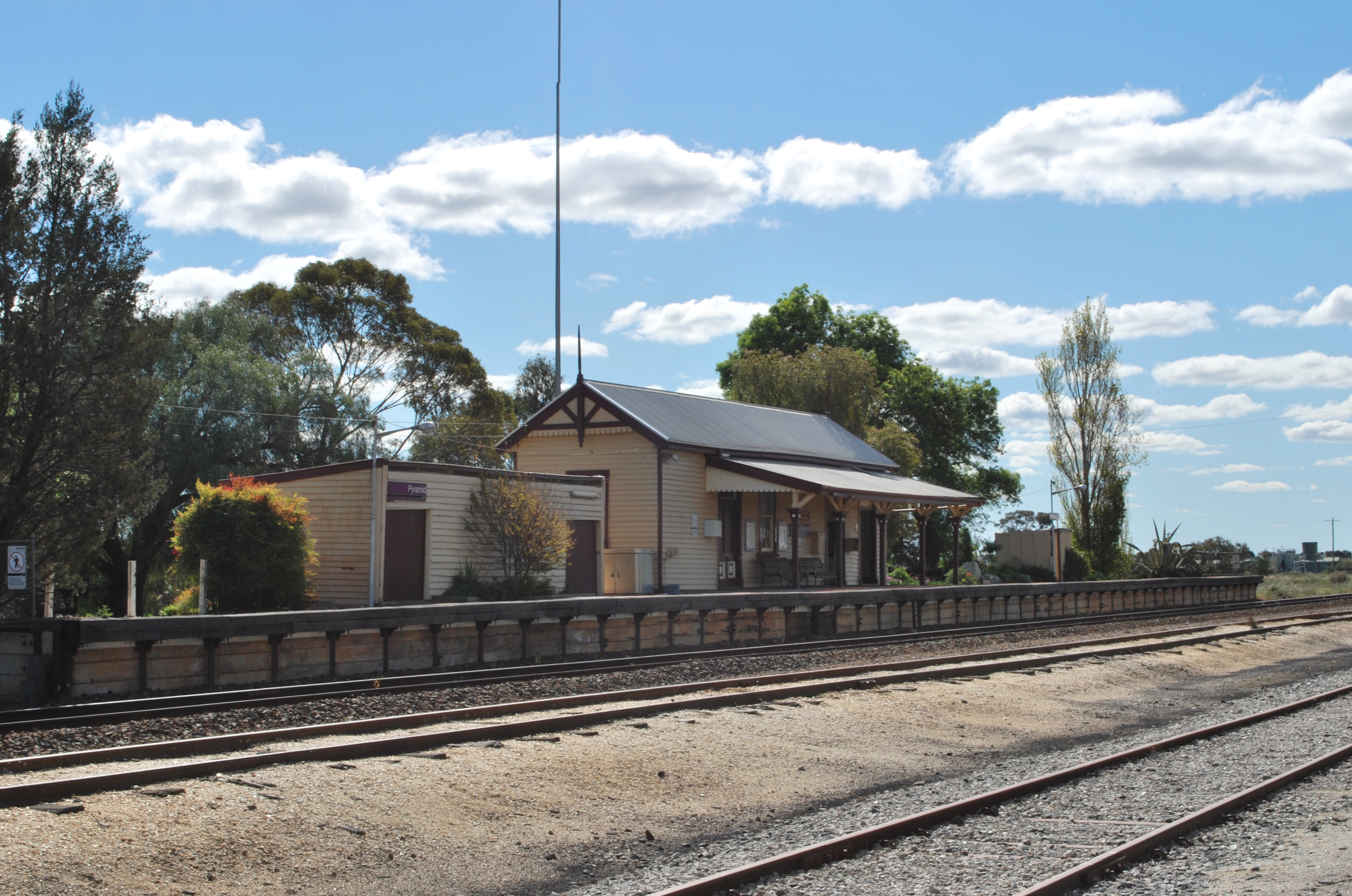
Pyramid railway station

At the time of her disappearance, Fraser was 23 years old, heavily pregnant, and living alone in a rental property in Pyramid Hill, having moved out of her family home at age 19. She moved into a small unit in a 1970s housing commission block near the Piangil railway line, close to her parents' home. Fraser wanted to live alone and make her own decisions, often disregarding her parents' requests about curfews or checking in with them.

She was preparing to give birth to her first child and was under medical supervision at Bendigo Base Hospital in the days leading up to her disappearance. Fraser was considered highly vulnerable due to her intellectual disability, and her family believed she would have been unable to care for a child independently. Fraser had named her unborn son Ryan, but told her family she was unsure who the father was. A 2022 inquest listed three possible candidates for the child's father, Gareth David, Tony Gatt and Peter "PJ" Jenkinson. During the inquest, evidence revealed that Gareth David initially told police he may have been the father, claiming he had sexual contact with Fraser in 2008, but he later retracted this statement, saying they had only kissed and cuddled and that he did not meet Fraser again or know she was pregnant at the time.

Fraser's family expressed concern that her naivety and trusting nature could leave her vulnerable to exploitation, including sexual exploitation or involvement with local drug dealers. They noted that Fraser had been paid by the government on specific days and was sometimes asked to purchase items for others. It was difficult for her to distinguish between people with good or bad intentions. Her intellectual disability had not been formally diagnosed because she had chosen not to undergo assessment after turning 18.

Fraser maintained personal relationships within her community, including a sexual relationship with Jenkinson, who was from Gunbower, who would later be identified as a person of interest in her disappearance. In the months leading up to her disappearance, Fraser regularly exchanged calls and messages with Jenkinson, but after a nine-minute phone call on 13 May 2009, he ceased using his personal mobile phone and landline, and subsequent contact was made via a public phone box on Findlay Avenue in Leitchville, 28 km north of Pyramid Hill. Investigators later determined that the calls from the Leitchville phone box were made by a person who may have had a secret relationship with Fraser and could have played a role in her disappearance and presumed death.

== Disappearance ==
On 19 June 2009, Fraser briefly returned home from Bendigo Base Hospital after experiencing pregnancy complications, but later that evening she left the hospital accommodation and travelled back to Pyramid Hill by train. She is believed to have had her hair cut earlier that day.

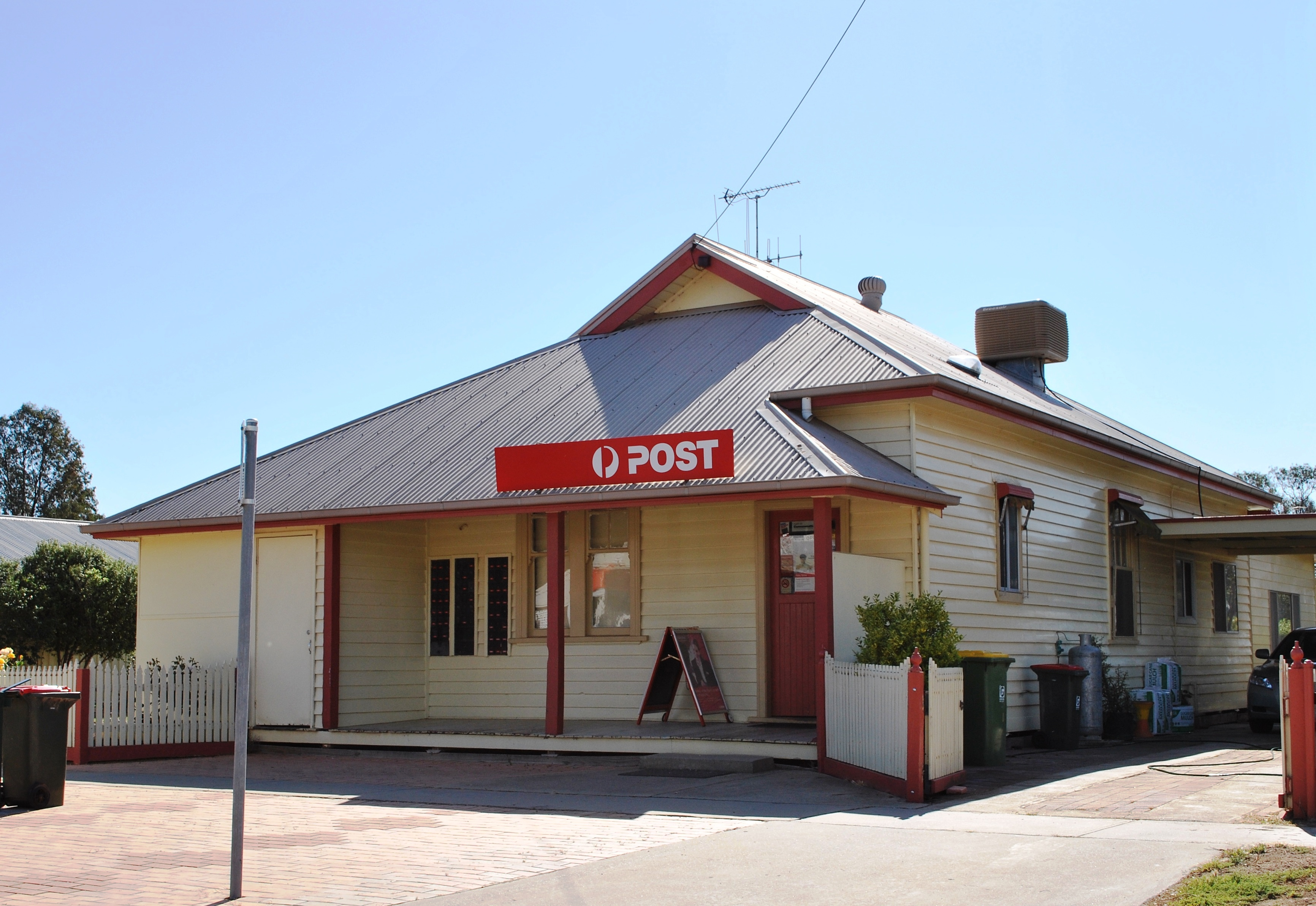
The Post office in Leitchville where the phone box was located

On 20 June, Fraser discharged herself from the Bendigo Base Hospital against medical advice to attend a birthday party in Cohuna. Police were unable to verify that the party existed and said it may have been used as a guise to lure Fraser, whom her mother described as "very naïve," to a location where foul play may have occurred. Fraser travelled on a V/Line train from Bendigo to Pyramid Hill on the day of her disappearance. She disembarked at Pyramid railway station at about 20:40. She was wearing an orange top, black track pants, and a camouflaged-patterned baseball cap.

Fraser was last seen leaving an address on Albert Street at around 21:30 after visiting an acquaintance. According to police, she most likely went home after this. At 23:59, Fraser then took a 40-second phone call on her mobile phone. The call was traced to a public telephone box outside the post office in the nearby town of Leitchville. Records show that Fraser had received 15 calls from that phone box in the two months prior to her disappearance, and no further calls were made to her phone from it after she went missing. Detective Inspector Julian Horan stated that he believed the caller knew what happened to Fraser, and may have been the father of Fraser's unborn child.

In the early hours of 21 June, her phone connected to two mobile towers, first in Patho and then in Leitchville. This was unusual for Fraser, whose phone historically had stayed along the Bendigo–Swan Hill rail line. Mobile phone records indicated that Fraser was in Leitchville at 02:49, approximately three hours after the call was received. Because of the distance from Pyramid Hill, Fraser could not have walked to these places herself, and she was also unable to drive. There is no railway access to Leitchville, Gunbower, or Cohuna; the Cohuna railway line, which served all three towns, was closed in 1981. It is unknown if Fraser was alive or dead at the times her phone made contact with the towers.

After 21 June, activity from her mobile phone and bank accounts ceased. Fraser's mobile phone has not been located.

== Investigation ==
In the immediate aftermath of her disappearance, police and local residents expressed concern for Fraser's welfare, noting that she was heavily pregnant, intellectually disabled, and without medical assistance. Senior Constable Jason Brady of Pyramid Hill stated that all efforts were being made to locate her and urged anyone with information to come forward. In the weeks following her disappearance, there were unconfirmed reports of Fraser being sighted in Bendigo, including at the Bendigo Marketplace on 21 June and near the Bendigo Post Office on 24 June. In July 2009, Police widened their search to South Australia. Early in the investigation, some local residents and police considered the possibility that Fraser may have voluntarily gone into hiding, although by October investigators stated that they believed she had been murdered.

In October 2009, a body was found in a barrel in Broadmeadows in Melbourne's north. Police stated that the body could have belonged Fraser, however Fraser was later ruled out as the victim.

Following Fraser's disappearance, several local men who had arguments with or connections to her died by suicide, including one who lived in the same housing block and another named Stephen Jones, who was good friends with Jenkinson. Although local rumors briefly suggested otherwise, Police dismissed these incidents as unrelated to the disappearance. In 2012, the Victoria Police Missing Persons Squad announced a $100,000 reward for information that could lead to the identification, arrest, and conviction of those responsible for Fraser's death. In 2019, it was raised to $1 Million.

Police inquiries determined that no party took place in Cohuna on the night of Fraser's disappearance, and investigators noted that she was associated with individuals from both the Cohuna and Gunbower areas.

In 2023, former police investigator Dennis O'Bryan wrote the book Last Train Home: The Disappearance of Krystal Fraser, exploring the case in depth and presenting new evidence and insights into the events surrounding her disappearance.

== Coronial inquest ==
A coronial inquest was held in July 2022. Coroner Katherine Lorenz concluded that Fraser likely died "very shortly" after receiving the phone call from the Leitchville phone box. She found that Fraser's death was caused by another person and that the available circumstantial evidence supported the conclusion that Jenkinson was involved in her disappearance in some way. Jenkinson was known to Fraser and had previously been in a sexual relationship with her, and was considered a person of interest in the investigation. Lorenz stated that, while there was insufficient evidence to determine to the required standard that Jenkinson was responsible for Fraser's death, there was also no evidence excluding him as a person who may have been involved. During the inquest, Jenkinson objected to giving evidence and was excused by the court on the grounds that his testimony could incriminate him in relation to Fraser's disappearance and presumed death.

The coroner found that Jenkinson was likely the person who called Fraser from the phone box and was involved in transporting her from Pyramid Hill to Leitchville, where her phone connected to the mobile towers. Phone records and evidence presented at the inquest indicated that Fraser and Jenkinson had exchanged over 2,000 calls and text messages, and that their contact shifted to the Leitchville public phone box in the weeks prior to her disappearance. Records also showed that Jenkinson was awake during the periods when Fraser's phone moved between locations, and he could not account for his whereabouts that evening. The inquest found that Jenkinson had misled police about the nature of his sexual relationship with Fraser, which was likely ongoing around the time her unborn child was conceived, and that he used the phone box to conceal his contact with her.

Lorenz further found that Jenkinson stopped contacting Fraser from his mobile phone or landline about a month before her disappearance and instead began calling her from the Leitchville public phone box, which the coroner said was done to conceal his contact with her. The inquest heard that Jenkinson had been interviewed multiple times by police and that his property, vehicles, and electronic devices were searched during the investigation. Jenkinson denied any involvement in Fraser's disappearance and denied speaking to her from the phone box on the night she vanished. Witnesses at the inquest stated that Jenkinson did not want the baby to be born, while Fraser did.

Testimony at the inquest revealed that Fraser had been paranoid in the days before her disappearance, claiming she owed money to people she supplied with cannabis, speed, and pills, and expressing fear for her safety. During the inquest, a witness reported seeing Fraser act erratically and get into a red station wagon on the night of her disappearance after a man told her to "get in, get in," with the vehicle later found burnt out in nearby bushes, prompting investigators to follow up on anyone associated with it.

The inquest was unable to determine the precise cause of death or the location of Fraser and her unborn child's remains. The inquest considered multiple theories about Fraser's disappearance, but none could be substantiated to the required legal standard. Jenkinson has not been charged with Fraser's murder.
