= Nyah Nyah West United Football Netball Club =

Nyah Nyah West United

Names
- Full name: Nyah Nyah West United Football and Netball Club Inc.
- Nickname(s): Demons, United

Club details
- Founded: 1978; 48 years ago
- Colours
- Competition: Central Murray Football Netball League
- President: Jarrod Skinner
- Coach: Corey Daniels & Joel Walsh
- Captain: Dom Gallo
- Premierships: CMFNL (4): 2000; 2001; 2024; 2026
- Ground: Nyah Recreation Reserve

Uniforms
Home

The Nyah Nyah West United Football Netball Club, nicknamed the Demons or United, is an Australian rules football and netball club based in Nyah, a town in northern Victoria. The club's teams currently play in the Central Murray Football Netball League. Born out of a merger between neighbouring Nyah and Nyah West in 1978, the Demons have won four senior football premierships in their history. The club won back-to-back flags in 2000 and 2001 before a mostly lean two decades to follow. A resurgent United has since played in three consecutive CMFNL grand finals, winning premierships in 2024 and 2026.

== History ==
Nyah Nyah West United was formed in 1978 when Nyah Football Club and Nyah West Football Club of the Mid-Murray Football League elected to merge. The club's senior team initially struggled following their formation and did not feature in a grand final in the Mid-Murray / Central Murray league until their breakthrough premiership win in 2000 over Cohuna Kangas. The Demons went back-to-back in 2001 with their defeat of Tyntynder.

The next two decades were a comparatively difficult period for the club. Finals appearances came in 2003 and 2004, yet in the 19 completed seasons between 2005 and 2022 inclusive, United finished in the bottom four in 13 of those years. This nadir was interrupted by a surprise grand final appearance in 2016, falling to Kerang (who would win their fifth of six straight premierships).

Following a first-round finals exit in 2017, it would take until 2023 for the Demons to return to post-season action after a late flurry of wins brought them to a preliminary final exit at the hands of Woorinen. In 2024, the Demons broke a 23-year premiership drought to upset Kerang by 54 points in the grand final; the Blues were chasing their ninth premiership in 13 completed seasons. Hopes of a second instance of back-to-back flags were dashed by Woorinen in 2025 as the Demons went down by 72 points. Yet in 2026, United returned to the top of the tree in the most dramatic of circumstances, denying Cohuna Kangas a maiden senior football premiership thanks to a shot after the siren by captain Dom Gallo marking a thrilling 3-point victory.

== Premierships ==
- Central Murray Football Netball League (4):
  - 2000, 2001, 2024, 2026

== Awards ==
=== League best and fairest ===
- 1982: David Simpson
- 1996: N. Katis

=== League leading goalkicker ===
- 1980: Don Rudd (67 goals)
- 2024: Brandyn Grenfell (73 goals)

== VFL/AFL players ==
- David Simpson (Richmond)
- Brent Daniels (Greater Western Sydney)

== Honour roll ==
=== Presidents ===
Period	President
1978–1980	W. J. Gleeson
1981	F. L. Boulton
1982–1983	I. D. Wright
1984–1987	G. Westcott
1988–1990	W. J. Gleeson
1991	R. Holland
1992–1994	F. J. Curran
1995–1998	D. Pearson
1999–2002	M. Curran
2003	R. Vandenberg
2004–2006	M. Thomson
2007–2008	O. Connick
2009	M. Ray
2010–2013	R. Duffy
2014	A. Thompson
2015–2016	G. Lowe
2017–2022	R. Duffy
2023–present	J. Skinner
