= Peter Laughlin =

Australian rules footballer

Personal information
- Full name: Peter Laughlin
- Born: 5 March 1956 (age 70)
- Original team: Nyah (MMFL)
- Height: 187 cm (6 ft 2 in)
- Weight: 87 kg (192 lb)

Playing career^{1}
Years	Club	Games (Goals)
1977–80	Richmond	25 (46)
1981–86	Norwood	67 (81)
Total		92 (127)
- ^{1} Playing statistics correct to the end of 1986.

Peter Laughlin (born 5 March 1956) is a former Australian rules footballer who played with Richmond in the Victorian Football League (VFL) and Norwood in the South Australian Football League.
