= Hylaeus murrayensis =

Scientific classification
- Kingdom: Animalia
- Phylum: Arthropoda
- Clade: Pancrustacea
- Class: Insecta
- Order: Hymenoptera
- Family: Colletidae
- Genus: Hylaeus
- Species: H. murrayensis

Binomial name
- Hylaeus murrayensis Rayment, 1935

Synonyms
- Hylaeus aralis murrayensis Rayment, 1935

Species of bee

Hylaeus murrayensis, or Hylaeus (Prosopisteron) murrayensis, is a species of bee in the family Colletidae and subfamily Hylaeinae. It is endemic to Australia. It was described by Australian entomologist Tarlton Rayment in 1935.

== Description ==
Female body length is about 5 mm. Integumental colouration is mainly black to greenish black, with cream to yellow markings.

== Distribution and habitat ==
The species occurs in inland south-eastern Australia. The type locality is Gunbower in north-western Victoria.

Onopordum acanthium (Scotch thistle), a forage plant of the bees

Onopordum acanthium flower

== Behaviour ==
The adults are flying mellivores. Flowering plants visited by the bees include Onopordum acanthium, also known as Scotch thistle or cotton thistle.
