= Central Murray Football Netball League =

Australian sports league

- Sport: Australian rules football
- Founded: 1946; 80 years ago
- First season: 1946
- No. of teams: 16
- Country: Australia
- Most recent champion: Nyah-Nyah West United (2026)
- Most titles: Swan Hill (19)
- Sponsors: Murray Downs Golf & Country Club, 3SH
- Related competitions: VFL, MFL
- Website: cmfnl.com.au

The Central Murray Football Netball League (CMFNL) is a major country Australian rules football and netball competition based in northern Victoria and southwest New South Wales in Australia.

== History ==
The league was formed as the Mid-Murray Football League in 1946 as local football resumed after World War II. Nyah won the inaugural premiership, defeating Woorinen in a three-team competition that also included Lake Boga. The MMFL more than doubled in size the following season as more clubs re-formed following the war.

In 1997, the Northern & Echuca Football League folded when its remaining clubs merged to form three new clubs and joined the MMFL. To reflect the larger geographical area the league now covered, the MMFL was re-named the Central Murray Football League. Leitchville-Gunbower joined the league in 2002 from the North Central Football League, while Tooleybuc merged with former Mallee Football League club Manangatang in 2004.

Leitchville-Gunbower moved to the Heathcote District Football League in 2010.

Hay, Moulamein, Murrabit, Ultima and Wandella joined the league following the demise of the Golden Rivers Football League after the 2025 season.

== Clubs ==
=== Current clubs ===
Club	Colours	Moniker	Home venue	Former league	Est.	Years in CMFNL	CMFNL premierships	
Club	Colours	Moniker	Home venue	Former league	Est.	Years in CMFNL	Total	Most recent
Balranald		Roos	Greenham Park, Balranald, New South Wales	NWMFL	1887	1955-	5	2009
Cohuna Kangas		Kangas	Cohuna Recreation Reserve, Cohuna, Victoria	—	1996	1997-	0	–
Hay		Lions	Hay Recreation Reserve, Hay, New South Wales	B&DFL, GRFL	1937	1975-1980, 2026-	0	-
Kerang (Kerang Rovers-Appin 1996-99)		Blues	Riverside Park, Kerang, Victoria	–	1996 (Note: as Kerang Rovers–Appin)	1997-	10	2023
Koondrook Barham		River Raiders	Barham Recreation Reserve, Barham, New South Wales	NEFL	1996	1997-	0	–
Lake Boga		Magpies	Lake Boga Community Park, Lake Boga, Victoria	NDFL	1892	1946-	6	2003
Mallee Eagles (Lalbert 1947-2010)		Eagles	Lalbert Recreation Reserve, Lalbert, Victoria	NDFL	1904 (Note: as Lalbert)	1947-	6	1996
Moulamein		Swans	Moulamein Recreation Reserve, Moulamein, New South Wales	GRFL	1946	2026-	0	-
Murrabit		Blues	Murrabit Recreation Reserve, Murrabit, Victoria	GRFL	1919	2026-	0	-
Nyah-Nyah West United		Demons	Nyah Recreation Reserve, Nyah, Victoria	–	1978	1978-	4	2026
Swan Hill		Swans	Swan Hill Showgrounds, Swan Hill, Victoria	NDFL	1941	1947-	19	2011
Tooleybuc Manangatang		Saints	Tooleybuc Recreation Reserve, Tooleybuc, New South Wales and Manangatang Recreation Reserve, Manangatang, Victoria	–	2004	2004-	1	2007
Tyntynder		Bulldogs	Alan Garden Reserve, Swan Hill, Victoria	NDFL	1919	1947-	13	1999
Ultima		Storm	Ultima Recreation Reserve, Ultima, Victoria	NDFL, GRFL	1905	1947-1954, 2026-	0	-
Wandella		Bombers	Wandella Recreation Reserve, Wandella, Victoria	GRFL	1922	2026-	0	-
Woorinen		Tigers	Woorinen Recreation Reserve, Woorinen, Victoria	MMFA	1919	1946-	11	2025

=== Former clubs ===
Club	Colours	Moniker	Home venue	Former league	Est.	Years in CMFNL	CMFNL premierships		Fate
Club	Colours	Moniker	Home venue	Former league	Est.	Years in CMFNL	Total	Most recent	Fate
Leitchville Gunbower		Bombers	Leitchville Recreaction Reserve, Leitchville and Gunbower Recreation Reserve, Gunbower	NCFL	1995	2002-2009	0	–	Moved to Heathcote District FL in 2003
Nyah		Bohemians, Bears	Nyah Recreation Reserve, Nyah	MMFA	1900s	1946-1977	3	1963	Merged with Nyah West to form Nyah-Nyah West United prior to 1978 season
Nyah West		Bombers	Nyah West Sports Ground, Nyah West	MMFA	1910s	1947-1977	0	–	Merged with Nyah to form Nyah-Nyah West United prior to 1978 season
Quambatook		Saints	Quambatook Recreation Reserve, Quambatook	K&DFL	1910s	1950-1972	0	–	Returned to Kerang & District FL in 1973
Tooleybuc		Bucs	Tooleybuc Recreation Reserve, Tooleybuc	NDFL	1903	1947-2003	1	1965	Merged with Manangatang to form Tooleybuc-Manangatang in 2004
Yarraby			Yarraby Recreation Reserve, Yarraby	MMFA	1910s	1949-1955	0	–	Folded after 1955 season

== Premierships ==
- 1946 Nyah
- 1947 Tyntynder
- 1948 Nyah
- 1949 Woorinen
- 1950 Swan Hill
- 1951 Lake Boga
- 1952 Lalbert
- 1953 Lake Boga
- 1954 Lake Boga
- 1955 Tyntynder
- 1956 Swan Hill
- 1957 Swan Hill
- 1958 Tyntynder
- 1959 Tyntynder
- 1960 Swan Hill
- 1961 Swan Hill
- 1962 Swan Hill
- 1963 Nyah
- 1964 Lalbert
- 1965 Tooleybuc
- 1966 Lalbert
- 1967 Lake Boga
- 1968 Swan Hill
- 1969 Swan Hill
- 1970 Swan Hill
- 1971 Woorinen
- 1972 Swan Hill
- 1973 Tyntynder
- 1974 Woorinen
- 1975 Lake Boga
- 1976 Lalbert
- 1977 Woorinen
- 1978 Swan Hill
- 1979 Woorinen
- 1980 Tyntynder
- 1981 Woorinen
- 1982 Swan Hill
- 1983 Tyntynder
- 1984 Tyntynder
- 1985 Swan Hill
- 1986 Tyntynder
- 1987 Tyntynder
- 1988 Swan Hill
- 1989 Balranald
- 1990 Balranald
- 1991 Swan Hill
- 1992 Lalbert
- 1993 Woorinen
- 1994 Balranald
- 1995 Swan Hill
- 1996 Lalbert
- 1997 Tyntynder
- 1998 Tyntynder
- 1999 Tyntynder
- 2000 NNW United
- 2001 NNW United
- 2002 Woorinen
- 2003 Lake Boga
- 2004 Kerang
- 2005 Swan Hill
- 2006 Balranald
- 2007 Tooleybuc-Manangatang
- 2008 Swan Hill
- 2009 Balranald
- 2010 Kerang
- 2011 Swan Hill
- 2012 Kerang
- 2013 Kerang
- 2014 Kerang
- 2015 Kerang
- 2016 Kerang
- 2017 Kerang
- 2018 Woorinen
- 2019 Woorinen
- 2020 League in recess due to COVID-19 pandemic
- 2021 Finals not played due to COVID-19 pandemic
- 2022 Kerang
- 2023 Kerang
- 2024 NNW United
- 2025 Woorinen
- 2026 NNW United
