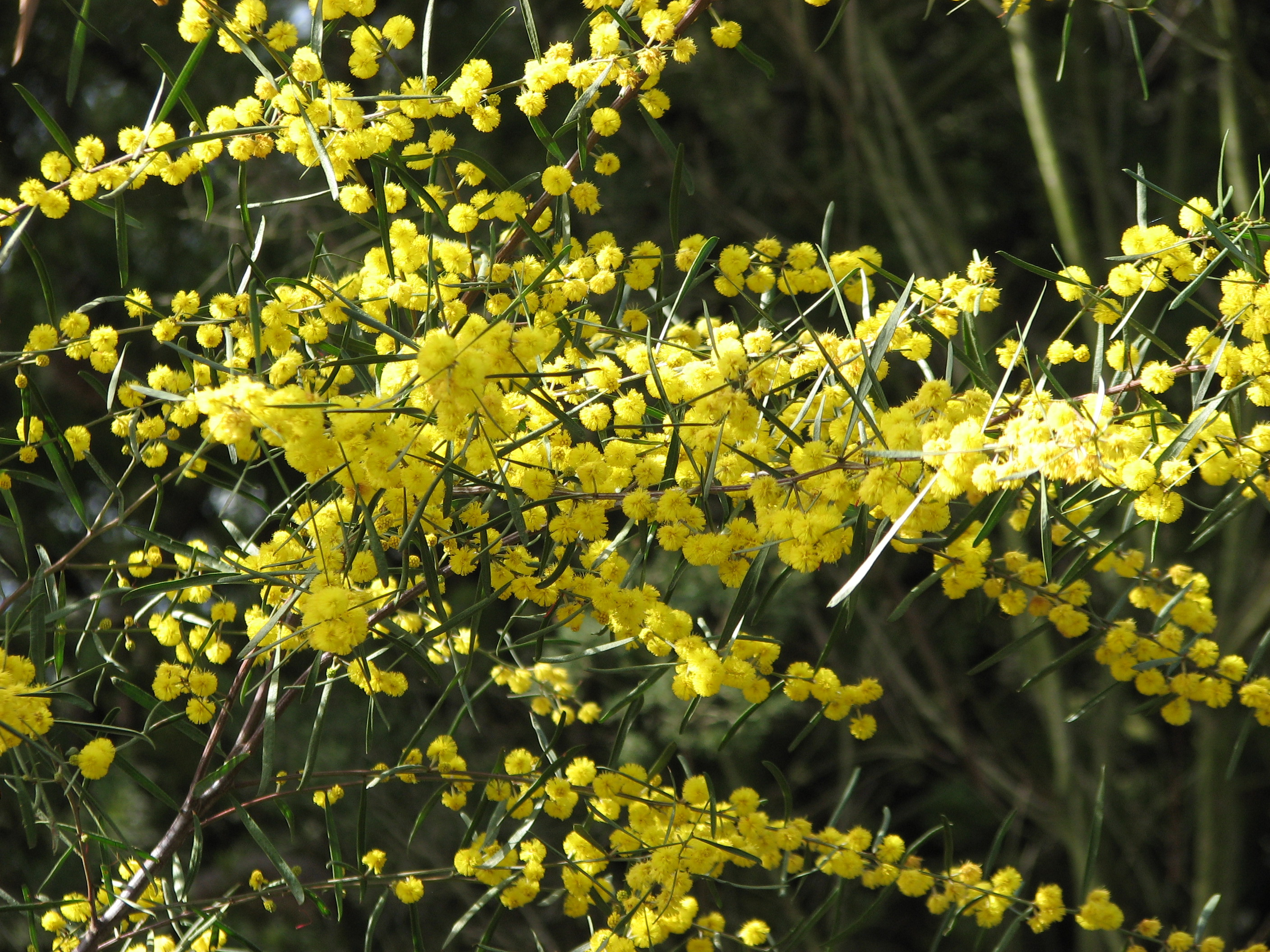
- In Maranoa Gardens

Scientific classification
- Kingdom: Plantae
- Clade: Tracheophytes
- Clade: Angiosperms
- Clade: Eudicots
- Clade: Rosids
- Order: Fabales
- Family: Fabaceae
- Subfamily: Caesalpinioideae
- Clade: Mimosoid clade
- Genus: Acacia
- Species: A. ausfeldii

Binomial name
- Acacia ausfeldii Regel
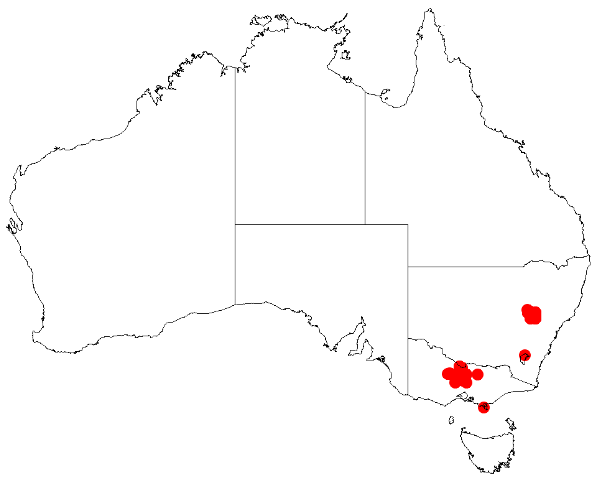
- Occurrence data from AVH

Synonyms
- Racosperma ausfeldii (Regel) Pedley

= Acacia ausfeldii =

Ausfeld's wattle

Species of legume

Acacia ausfeldii, commonly known as Ausfeld's wattle or whipstick cinnamon wattle, is a species of flowering plant in the family Fabaceae and is endemic to south-eastern Australia. It is an erect or spreading shrub with narrowly elliptic, linear or lance-shaped phyllodes with the narrower end towards the base, spherical heads of bright yellow flowers arranged in axils, and straight, firmly papery pods up to 100 mm (3.9 in) long.

== Description ==
Acacia ausfeldii is an erect or spreading shrub that typically grows to a height of 2–4 m (6 ft 7 in – 13 ft 1 in) with glabrous, sticky branchlets. Its phyllodes are narrowly elliptic, linear or lance-shaped with the narrower end towards the base, 20–70 mm (0.79–2.76 in) long and 2–6 mm (0.079–0.236 in) wide. The flowers are usually arranged in two spherical head in axils, each head on a peduncle 4–9 mm (0.16–0.35 in) long, with 25 to 45 bright yellow flowers. Flowering occurs from August to October, and the pods are firmly papery, linear, and raised over the seeds, shiny dark brown, 30–100 mm (1.2–3.9 in) long and 25–40 mm (0.98–1.57 in) wide.

== Taxonomy ==
Acacia ausfeldii was first formally described in 1867 by German botanist Eduard August von Regel based on a horticultural specimen grown from seed collected by J.G. Ausfeld in Bendigo, Victoria.

== Distribution and habitat ==
Ausfeld's wattle grows in alluvial gullies on flats and low hills between Mudgee, Ulan and Gulgong in New South Wales, and in dry forest and mallee between the Inglewood-Nagambie areas and Torrumbarry in Victoria.

== Conservation status ==
Acacia ausfeldii is listed as "vulnerable" under the New South Wales Government Biodiversity Conservation Act 2016 (NSW).
