= Leioproctus ferrisi =

Scientific classification
- Kingdom: Animalia
- Phylum: Arthropoda
- Clade: Pancrustacea
- Class: Insecta
- Order: Hymenoptera
- Family: Colletidae
- Genus: Leioproctus
- Species: L. ferrisi

Binomial name
- Leioproctus ferrisi (Rayment, 1935)

Synonyms
- Paracolletes ferrisi Rayment, 1935

Species of bee

Leioproctus ferrisi is a species of bee in the family Colletidae and subfamily Colletinae. It is endemic to Australia. It was described by Australian entomologist Tarlton Rayment in 1935.

== Description ==
Male body length is about 9 mm. Integumental colouration is mainly black and ferruginous; the hair is white to pale brown and yellow.

== Distribution and habitat ==
The species occurs in south-eastern Australia. The type locality is Gunbower in north-western Victoria.

== Behaviour ==
The adults are flying mellivores.
