= Nyrraby =

Nyrraby Victoria
- Coordinates: 35°13′S 143°13′E
- Population: 18 (2016 census)
- Postcode(s): 3585
- Location: 377 km (234 mi) from Melbourne; 39 km (24 mi) from Swan Hill; 100 km (62 mi) from Ouyen; 123 km (76 mi) from Robinvale
- LGA(s): Rural City of Swan Hill
Localities around Nyrraby:
Turoar	Towan	Nyah West
Turoar	Nyrraby	Pira
Polisbet	Nowie	Pira

Nyrraby is a locality in Victoria, Australia, located approximately 39 km from Swan Hill, Victoria.
