= Turoar =

Turoar Victoria
- Coordinates: 35°10′40″S 143°05′59″E
- Population: 0
- Postcode(s): 3546
- LGA(s): Rural City of Swan Hill
- State electorate(s): Mildura
- Federal division(s): Mallee
Localities around Turoar:
Manangatang	Manangatang	Piangil
Chinkapook	Turoar	Towan
Chillingollah	Polisbet	Nyrraby

Turoar is a locality in the Rural City of Swan Hill, Victoria, Australia. Towan Plains Reserve is in the locality of Turoar and has powdered gypsum and salt. Turoar post office opened on 15 November 1919 and was closed on 31 October 1942.
