= Nyah, Victoria =

Nyah
- Town
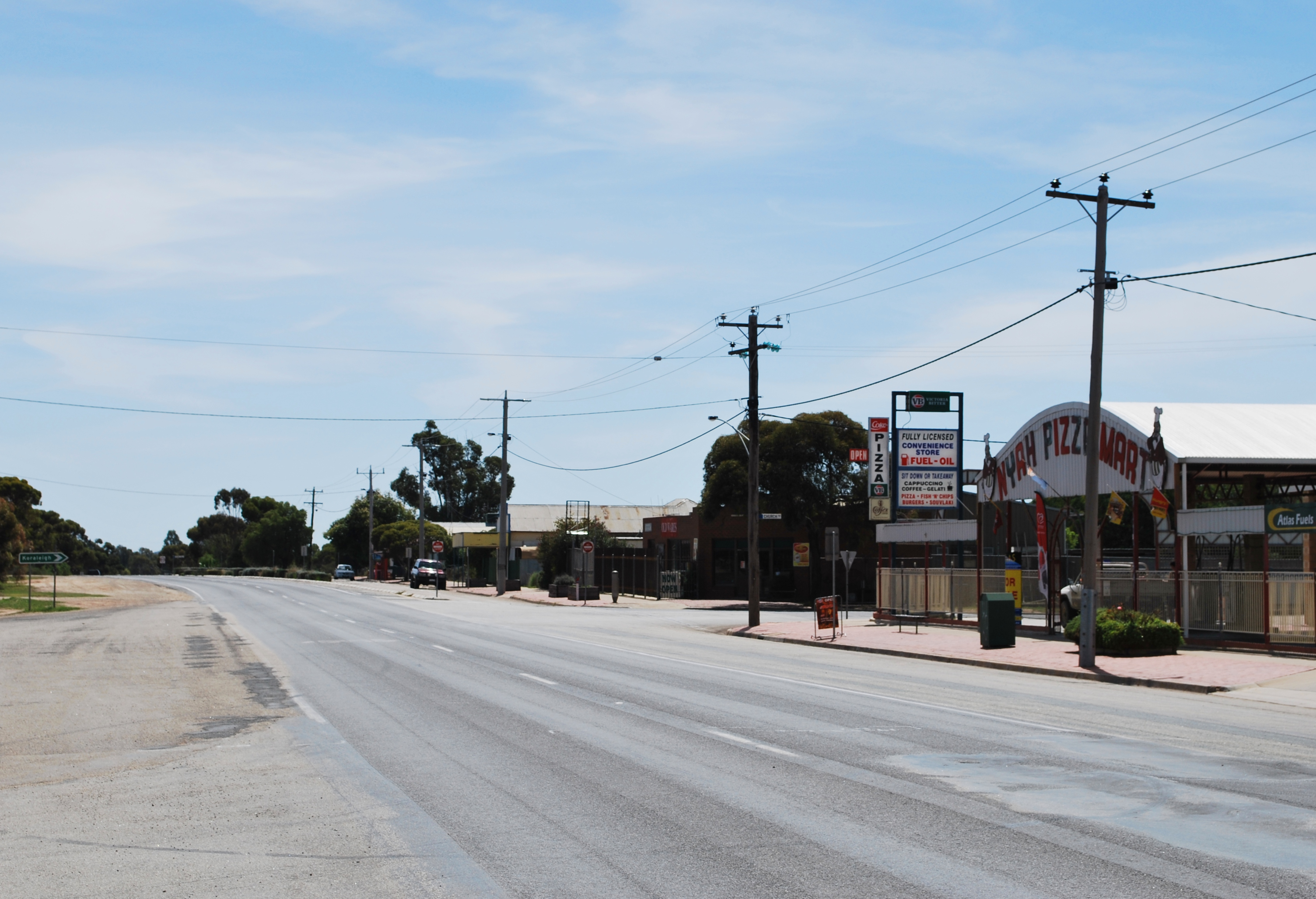
- Murray Valley Highway at Nyah

- Coordinates: 35°10′0″S 143°23′0″E
- Country: Australia
- State: Victoria
- LGA: Rural City of Swan Hill
- Location: 365 km (227 mi) NW of Melbourne; 29 km (18 mi) NW of Swan Hill; 6 km (3.7 mi) east of Nyah West

Government
  - State electorate: Murray Plains
  - Federal division: Mallee

Population
  - Total: 536 (2021 census)
- Postcode: 3594
Localities around Nyah
Miralie	Wood Wood	New South Wales
Nyah West	Nyah	New South Wales
Nyah West	Nyah West	Vinifera

Nyah (/naɪə/) is a town in northern Victoria, Australia. The town is located on the Murray Valley Highway, in the Rural City of Swan Hill local government area, 365 kilometres (227 mi) north west of the state capital, Melbourne. At the 2021 census, Nyah had a population of 536.

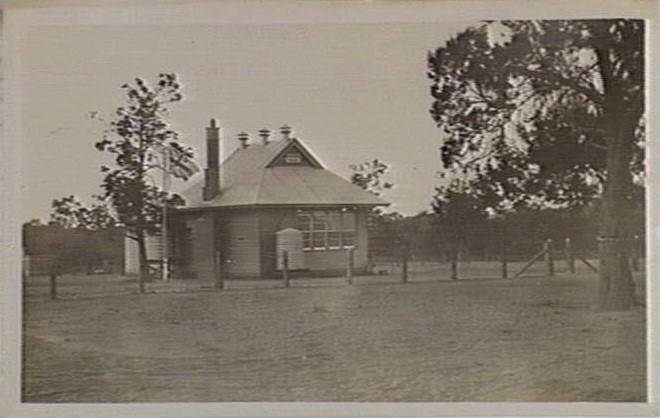
Nyah State School (1912)

The town, on the banks of the Murray River was formed as the "Taverner Community Village Settlement" in the 1890s by Jim Thwaites as a utopian socialist community, one of many established along the Murray, including Waikerie in South Australia. The communities were established in imitation of the New Australia settlement of William Lane in Paraguay. Lack of access to water for fields and a falling-out of favour of socialism led to the end of state support for these communities.

The Post Office opened on 4 May 1894 (though known as Tyntynder for some months).

The Nyah State School was established in 1896 when classes were first held in the town's Top Hall. A school was built in 1912, which had been thrice extended by the end of the 1960s. In 1997, Nyah Primary School amalgamated with Nyah West Primary school to create the Nyah District Primary School.

The town in conjunction with neighbouring township Nyah West (after a merger of the Nyah and Nyah West football clubs) has an Australian Rules football team competing in the Central Murray Football League known as Nyah-Nyah West United.

Nyah Harness Racing Club conducts regular meetings at its racetrack in the town.

Golfers play at the course of the Nyah District Golf Club on the Murray Valley Highway.

== Gallery ==
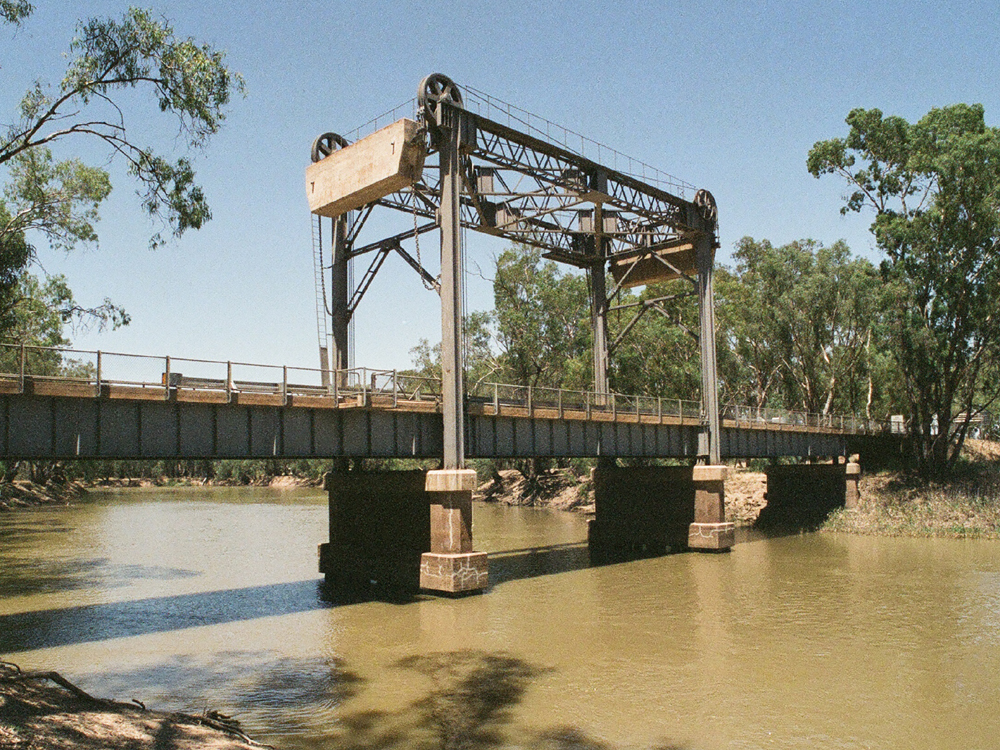
Nyah Bridge (2008)

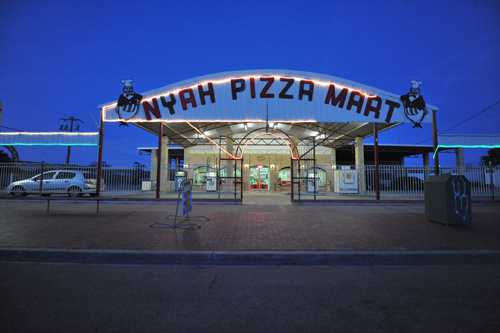
Nyah Pizza Mart (2009)

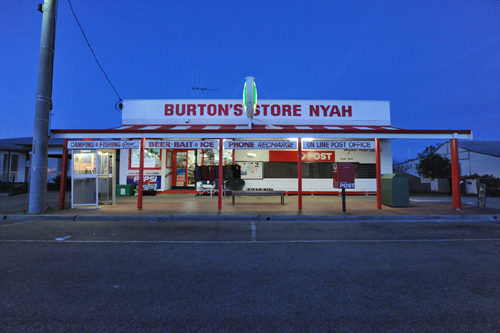
Nyah Post Office (2009)

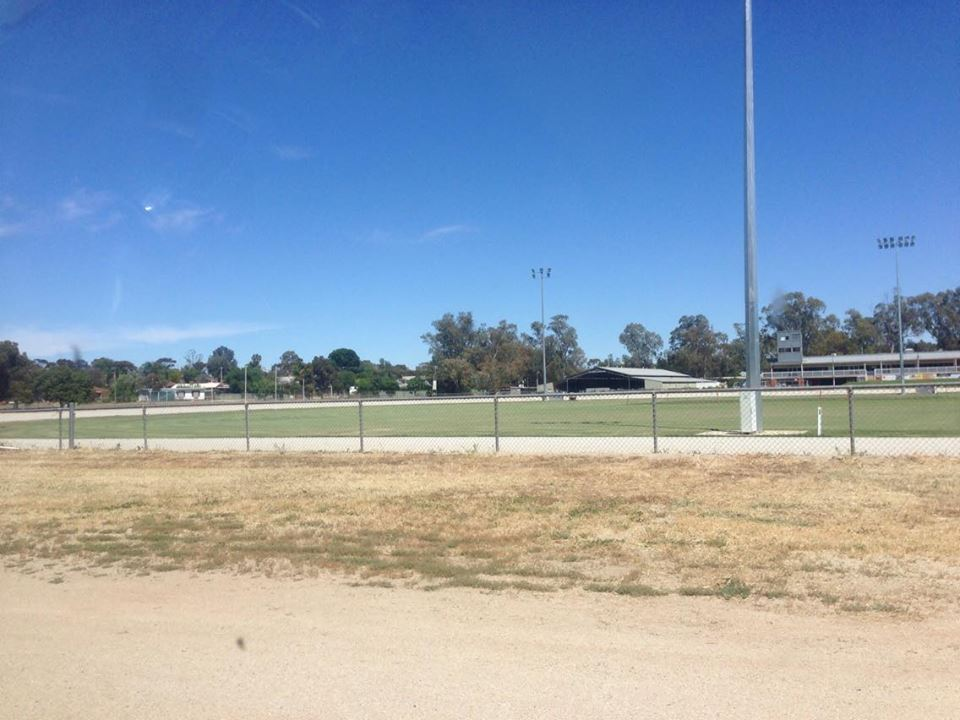
Recreation Reserve from East (2016)

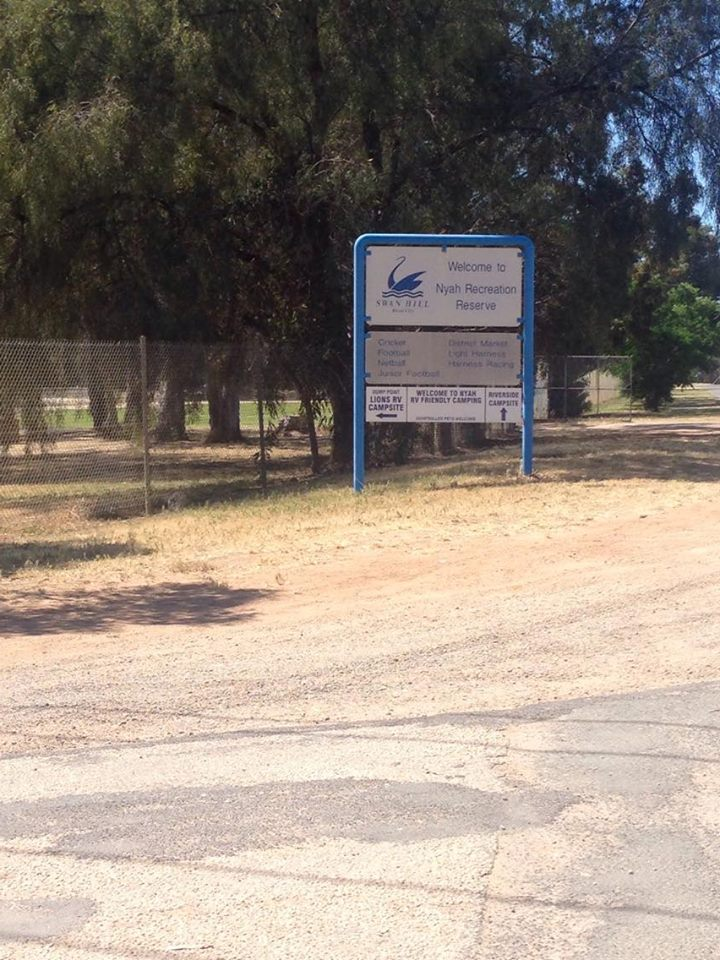
Recreation Reserve Entrance Sign (2016)

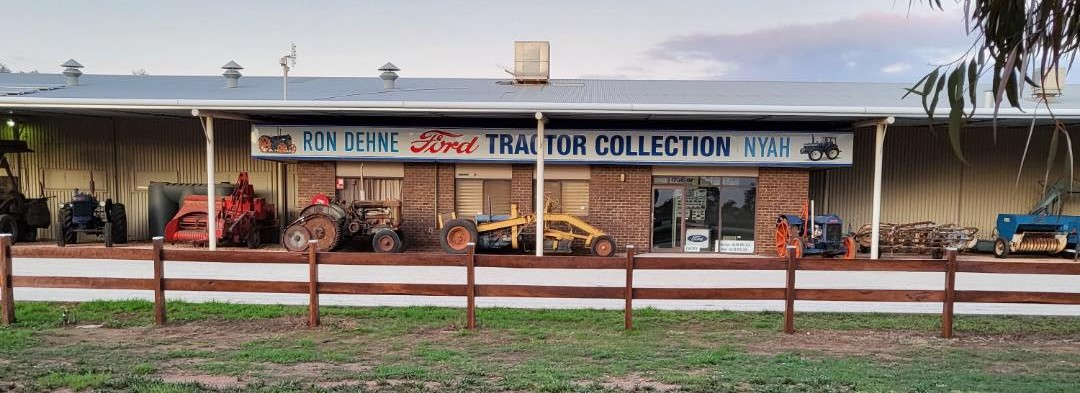
Australia's largest privately owned Ford tractor collection

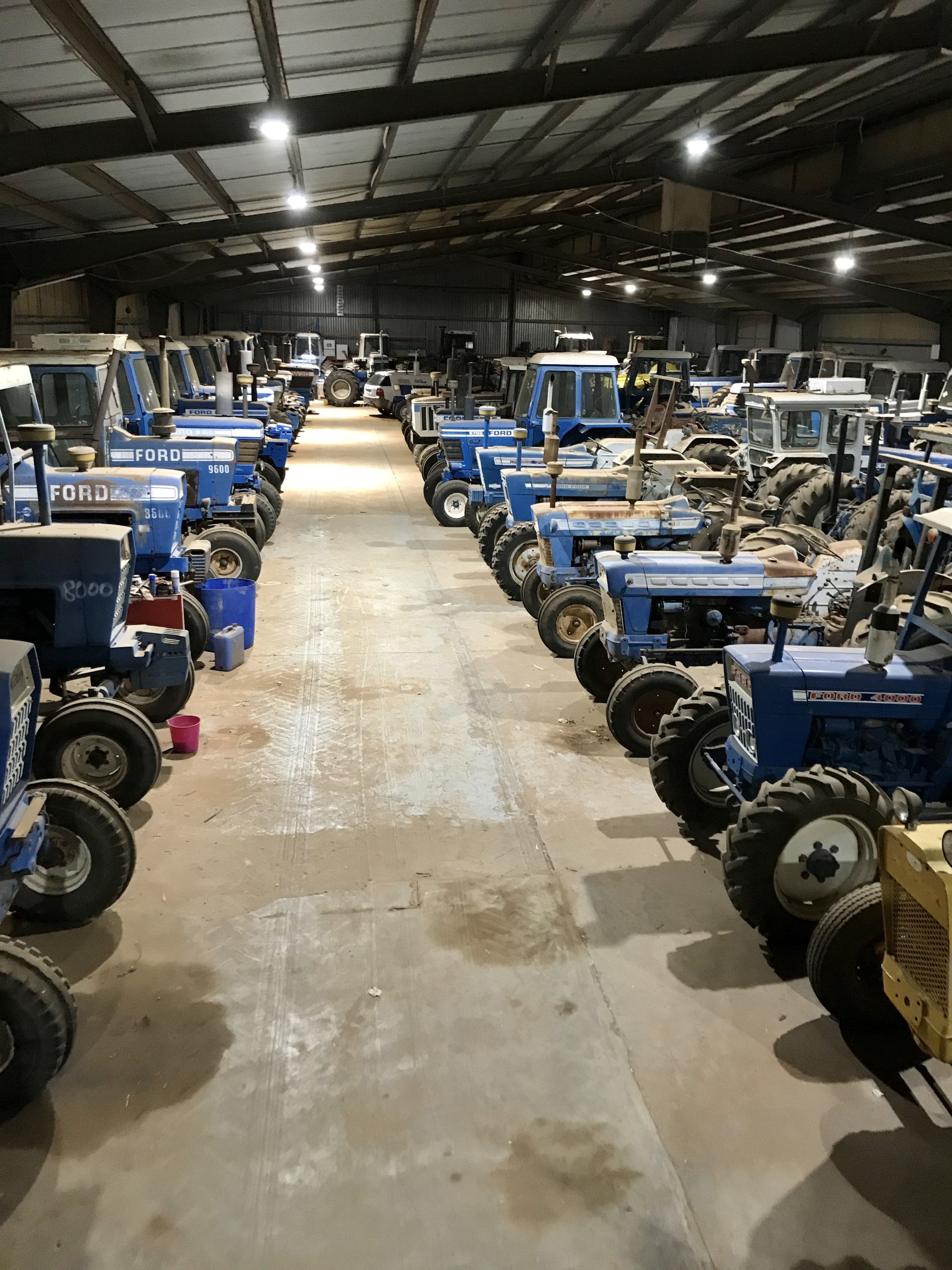
Part of Australia's largest privately owned Ford tractor collection in Nyah. 2023

== Climate ==
Climate data for Nyah, Victoria
Month	Jan	Feb	Mar	Apr	May	Jun	Jul	Aug	Sep	Oct	Nov	Dec	Year
Average rainfall inches	0.84	0.89	0.88	0.88	1.25	1.23	1.20	1.26	1.19	1.27	1.08	0.98	12.89
Average rainfall mm	21.4	22.7	22.3	22.3	31.7	31.2	30.5	31.9	30.3	32.2	27.5	24.8	327.5
