= Patho =

- Town
- Coordinates: 36°00′17″S 144°25′26″E
- Country: Australia
- State: Victoria
- LGA: Shire of Campaspe

Government
  - State electorate: Murray Plains
  - Federal division: Nicholls

Population
  - Total: 138 (2021 census)
- Postcode: 3564
Localities around Patho
Gunbower	Gunbower	Womboota
Pyramid Hill	Patho	Torrumbarry
Terrick Terrick East	Terrick Terrick East	Torrumbarry

Patho is a locality in the Shire of Campaspe, Victoria, Australia. At the 2021 census, Patho had a population of 138.
