= Jeff Fehring =

Australian rules footballer, born 1955

Personal information
- Born: 21 April 1955; Leitchville, Victoria
- Died: 25 July 2008 (aged 53); Hay, New South Wales
- Original team: Leitchville Gunbower
- Height: 198 cm (6 ft 6 in)
- Weight: 106 kg (234 lb)
- Position: Ruckman

Playing career^{1}
Years	Club	Games (Goals)
1977–1979	Geelong	19 (1)
1980–1981	St Kilda	17 (3)
1977–1979	Norwood	21 (9)
Total		57 (13)
- ^{1} Playing statistics correct to the end of 1981.

Jeff Fehring (21 April 1955 – 25 July 2008) was an Australian rules footballer who played for Geelong and St Kilda in the Victorian Football League (as the AFL was then known) from 1977 to 1981.

Fehring was born at Leitchville, on the Murray River, near Echuca. He made his debut as a ruckman with the Geelong Football Club in 1977, playing 19 games and kicking 1 goal until 1979. He moved to St Kilda in 1980, and in 1981 his moment of fame came. While he only went on to play 17 games and kick 3 goals for St Kilda, one of those goals was a huge torpedo punt that was estimated to be 84–86 metres, kicked from beyond the centre circle at Moorabbin in 1981. The goal came minutes after he was reported, and he was so fired up that he kicked the (wind-assisted) goal, one of the biggest in Australian rules football history.

Fehring's VFL career was over at the end of the 1981 season, and he moved to Adelaide to play for Norwood Football Club in the South Australian National Football League (SANFL). After playing in Norwood's 1982 premiership, Fehring retired from football and became a cattle farmer after marrying in 1984, but with water prices affected by drought, he was forced to sell his farm and livestock and move to Alexandra, where it was hoped there would be more rain. Despite working several jobs, Fehring lost his emu and cattle farm, and his marriage. Taking custody of his two children, he moved to Darwin briefly, before buying a pub and hotel in Deniliquin in southern New South Wales. That business also failed, and beset by health problems including Type 2 diabetes and recurring heart problems, Fehring committed suicide on 25 July 2008.
