= Towan, Victoria =

Towan Victoria
- Coordinates: 35°09′25″S 143°12′38″E
- Population: 11 (2016 census)
- Postcode(s): 3596
- LGA(s): Rural City of Swan Hill
- State electorate(s): Mildura
- Federal division(s): Mallee
Localities around Towan:
Piangil	Piangil	Miralie
Turoar	Towan	Nyah West
Turoar	Nyrraby	Nyah West

Towan is a locality in the Rural City of Swan Hill, Victoria, Australia. Towan post office opened on 15 October 1915 and was closed on the 17 July 1962.
