= Miralie =

Miralie Victoria
- Coordinates: 35°06′49″S 143°18′44″E
- Population: 02016 census
- Postcode(s): 3596
- LGA(s): Rural City of Swan Hill
- State electorate(s): Mildura
- Federal division(s): Mallee
Localities around Miralie:
Piangil	Wood Wood	Wood Wood
Towan	Miralie	Nyah
Towan	Nyah West	Nyah

Miralie is a locality in the Rural City of Swan Hill, Victoria, Australia. Miralie Train Station is a grain station on the Piangil railway line. Miralie post office opened on 11 March 1925 and was closed on 22 July 1925.
