= Lake Boga Football Netball Club =

Lake Boga

Names
- Full name: Lake Boga Football Netball Club
- Nickname(s): Magpies

Club details
- Founded: 1892; 133 years ago
- Colours: Black White
- Competition: Central Murray FNL
- Premierships: 1 (2003)
- Ground(s): Lake Boga Recreation Reserve

Uniforms
Home

The Lake Boga Football Netball Club, nicknamed the Magpies, is an Australian rules football and netball club based in the town of Lake Boga, Victoria.

== History ==
Lake Boga is a small town (pop 982), 14 km south of Swan Hill. The township was declared in 1892, the same year the football team was formed.

Lake Boga played its first match in May 1892, at home against one of the Swan Hill townships sides, the “Faugh-a-Ballaghs” . From its inception Lake Boga competed in small football competitions that occurred in the district that often had two teams residing in Swan Hill. The name of these competitions changed frequently until 1933 when the Northern District FL was founded in which Lake Boga was a founding member. That competition ceased because of the WW II. When football resumed after the war the local competition was the Mid Murray FL.

When in 1997 the Mid Murray FL merged with the Northern & Echuca FL it became the Central Murray Football League, which the club is founding member.

=== Premierships ===
- Swan Hill FA
  - 1899, 1905, 1906, 1916, 1923, 1927,
- Northern Districts FL
  - 1940
- Mid Murray FL
  - 1951, 1953, 1954, 1967, 1975
- Central Murray FL
  - 2003

== VFL/AFL players ==
- Dick O'Bree - Collingwood

== Bibliography ==
- In Full Flight, the Magpie's Story: A Centenary History of Lake Boga Football Club 1892-1992 by Graeme Gardner, 1992, ISBN 0646084712
