= Nyah West =

Nyah West Victoria
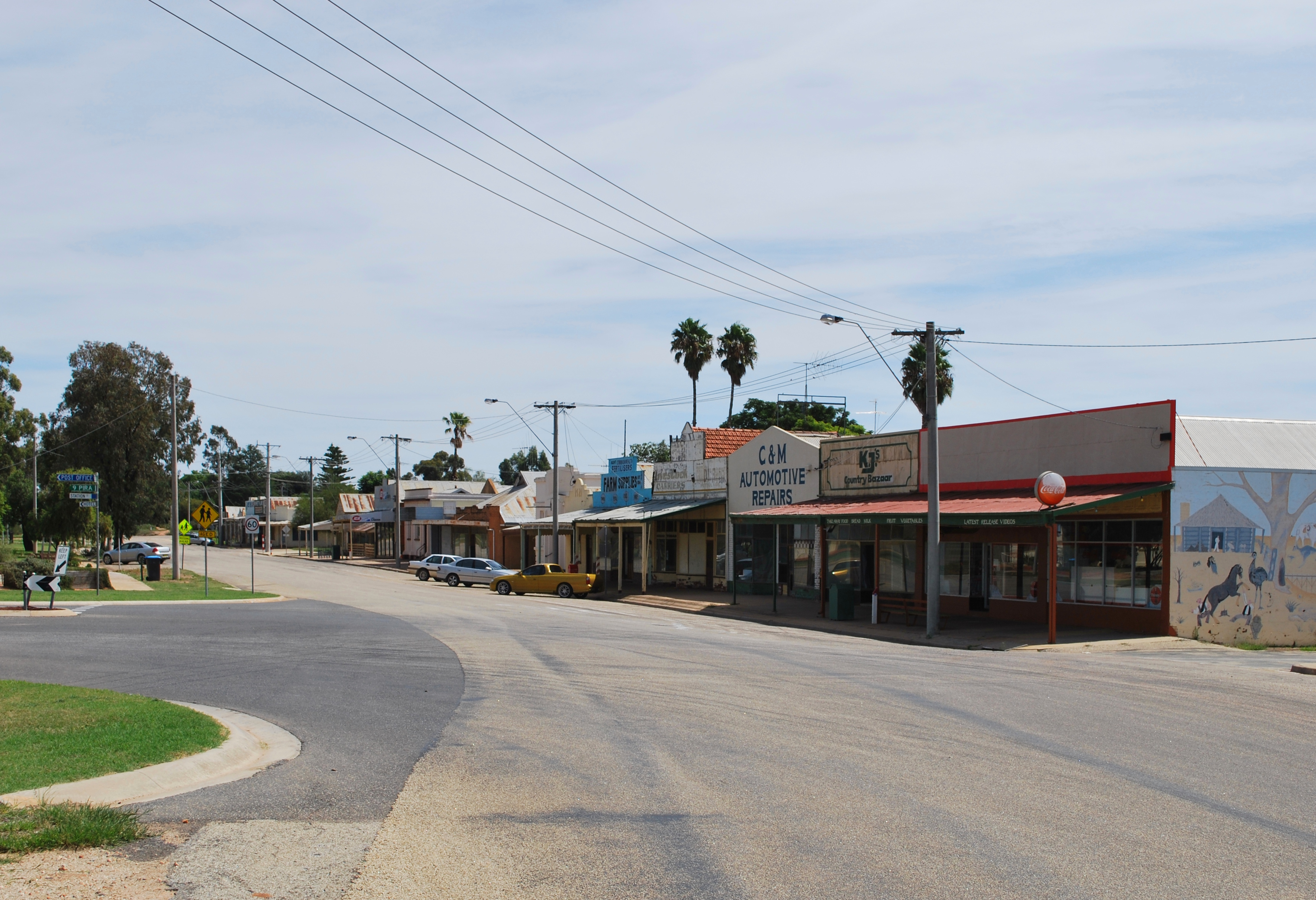
- Monash Street, the main street of Nyah West

- Coordinates: 35°11′S 143°20′E
- Population: 663 (2016 census)
- Postcode(s): 3595
- Location: 27 km (17 mi) NW of Swan Hill; 30 km (19 mi) S of Tooleybuc; 371 km (231 mi) NW of Melbourne
- LGA(s): Rural City of Swan Hill
- State electorate(s): Murray Plains
- Federal division(s): Mallee
Localities around Nyah West:
Towan	Miralie	Nyah
Towan	Nyah West	Nyah
Nyrraby	Pira	Vinifera

Nyah West is a town in Victoria (Australia) near the Murray River, the border with New South Wales. It is near the Murray Valley Highway (Nyah West is on the railway line, Nyah is on the highway), 371 kilometres (231 mi) north-west of Melbourne and 27 kilometres (17 mi) north-west of Swan Hill.

The town was established when the railway line was extended from Swan Hill to Piangil in 1915 passing some distance to the west of the established township of Nyah. A full Post Office opened here on 1 December 1917. Nyah West Magistrates' Court was formally closed on 1 September 1982, having used a local hall rather than its own courthouse and not having sat for many years.

At the 2011 census, Nyah West had a population of 552. It is the business and commercial centre of a prosperous irrigation district which produces wine and dried fruit, as well as vegetables and wool.

The town in conjunction with neighbouring township Nyah has an Australian Rules football team competing in the Central Murray Football League known as Nyah-Nyah West United.

Golfers play at the course of the Nyah West Golf Club on Yarraby Road.

== Gallery ==
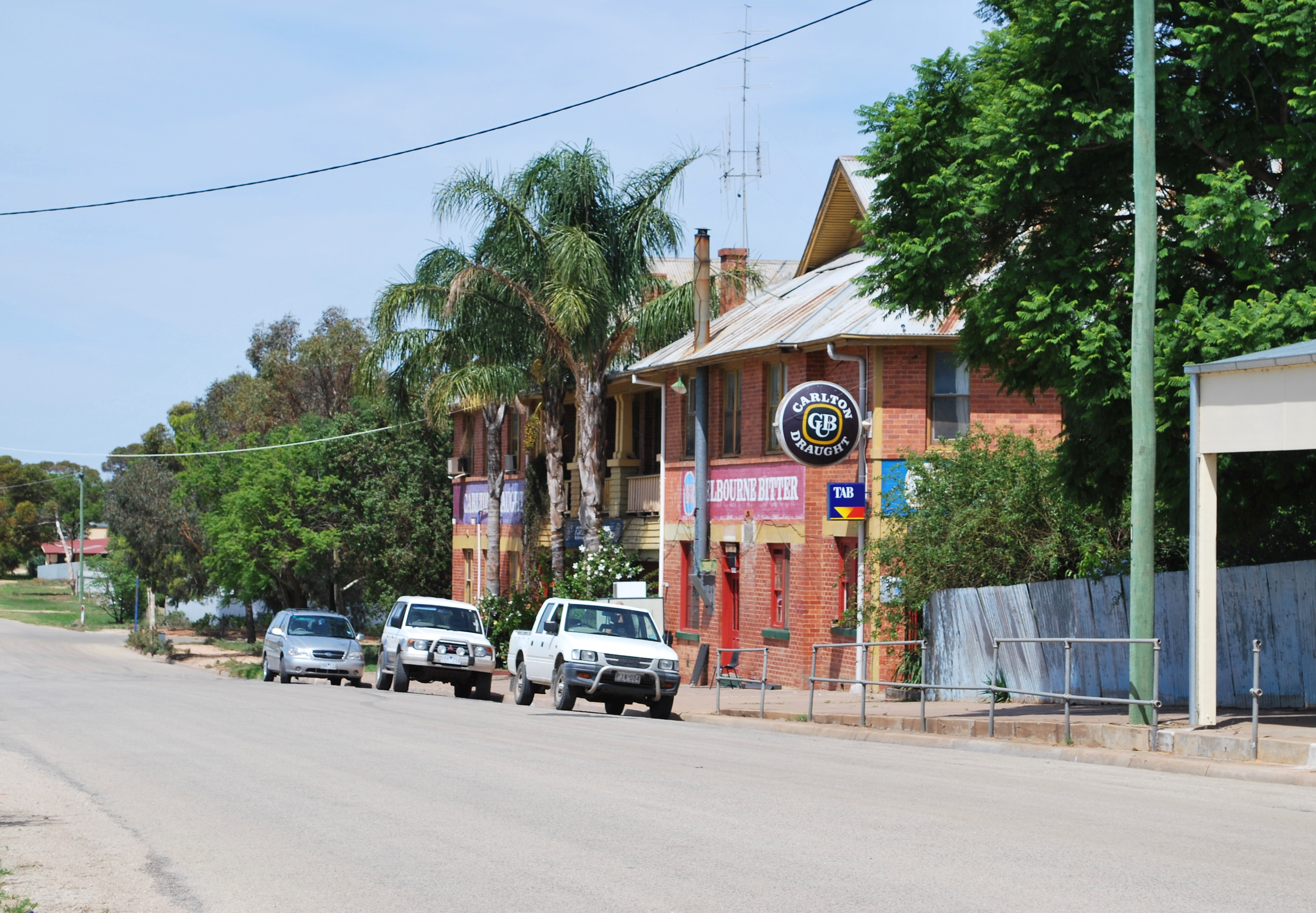
Grand Hotel on Station Street

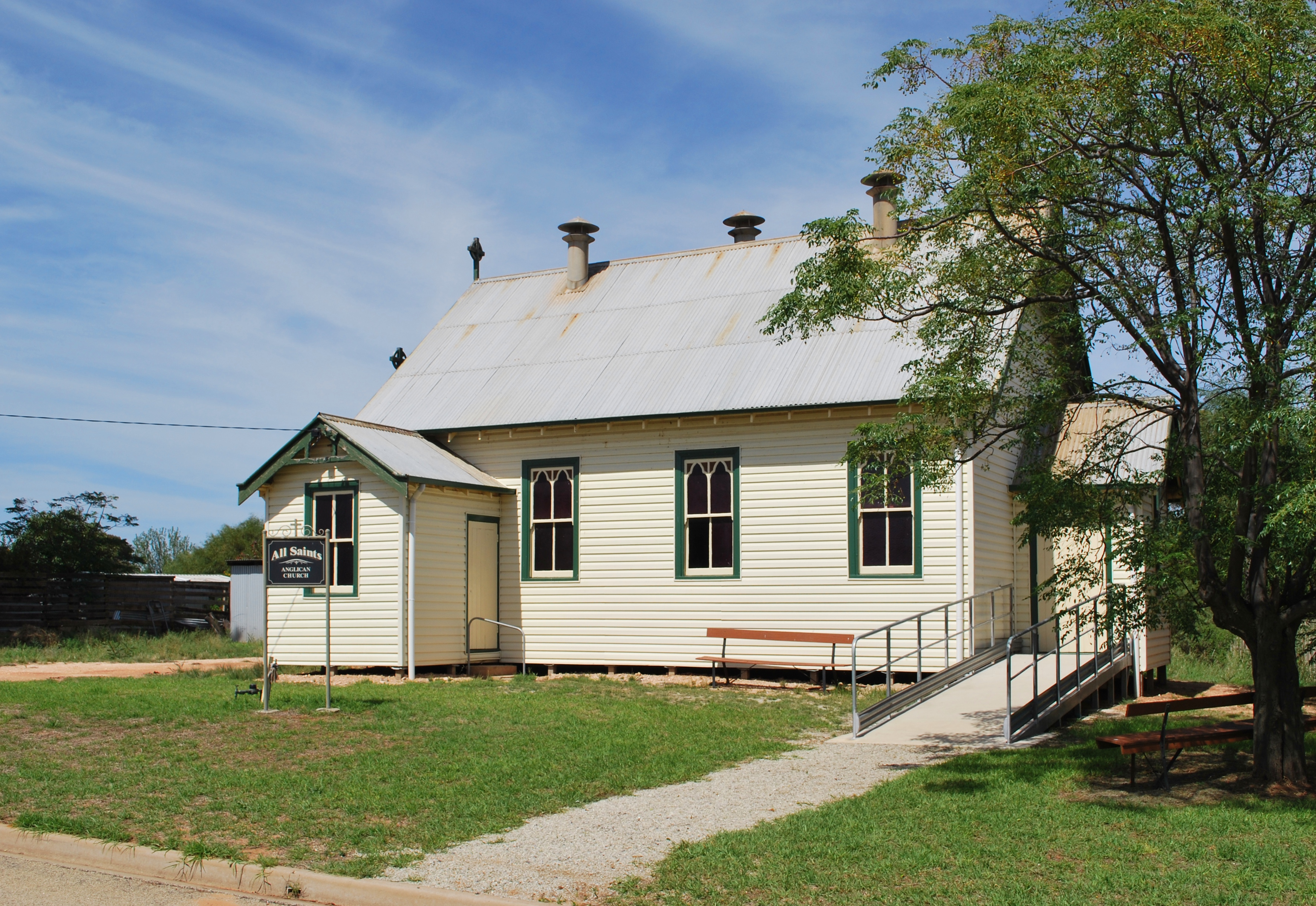
Anglican church

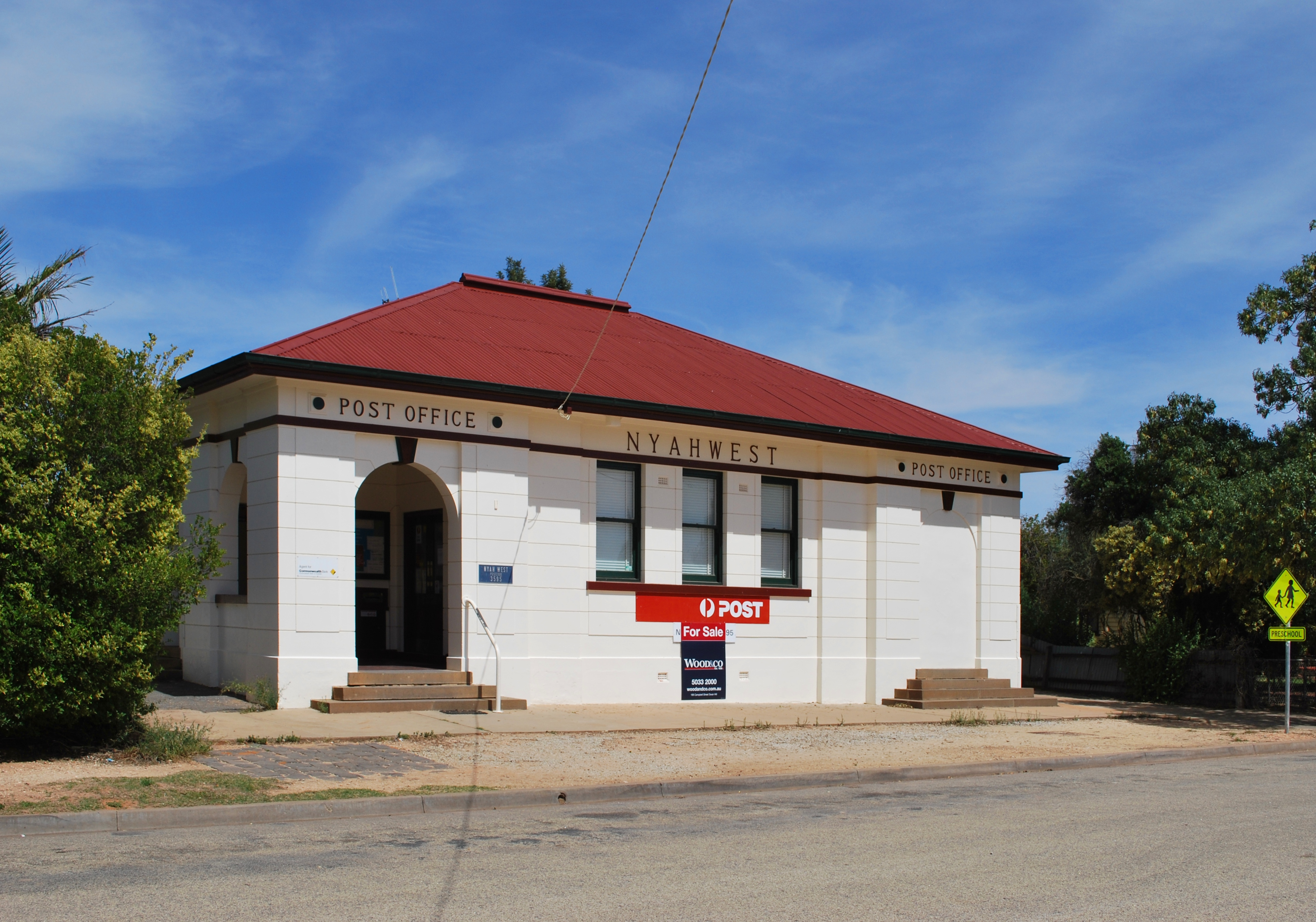
Post office

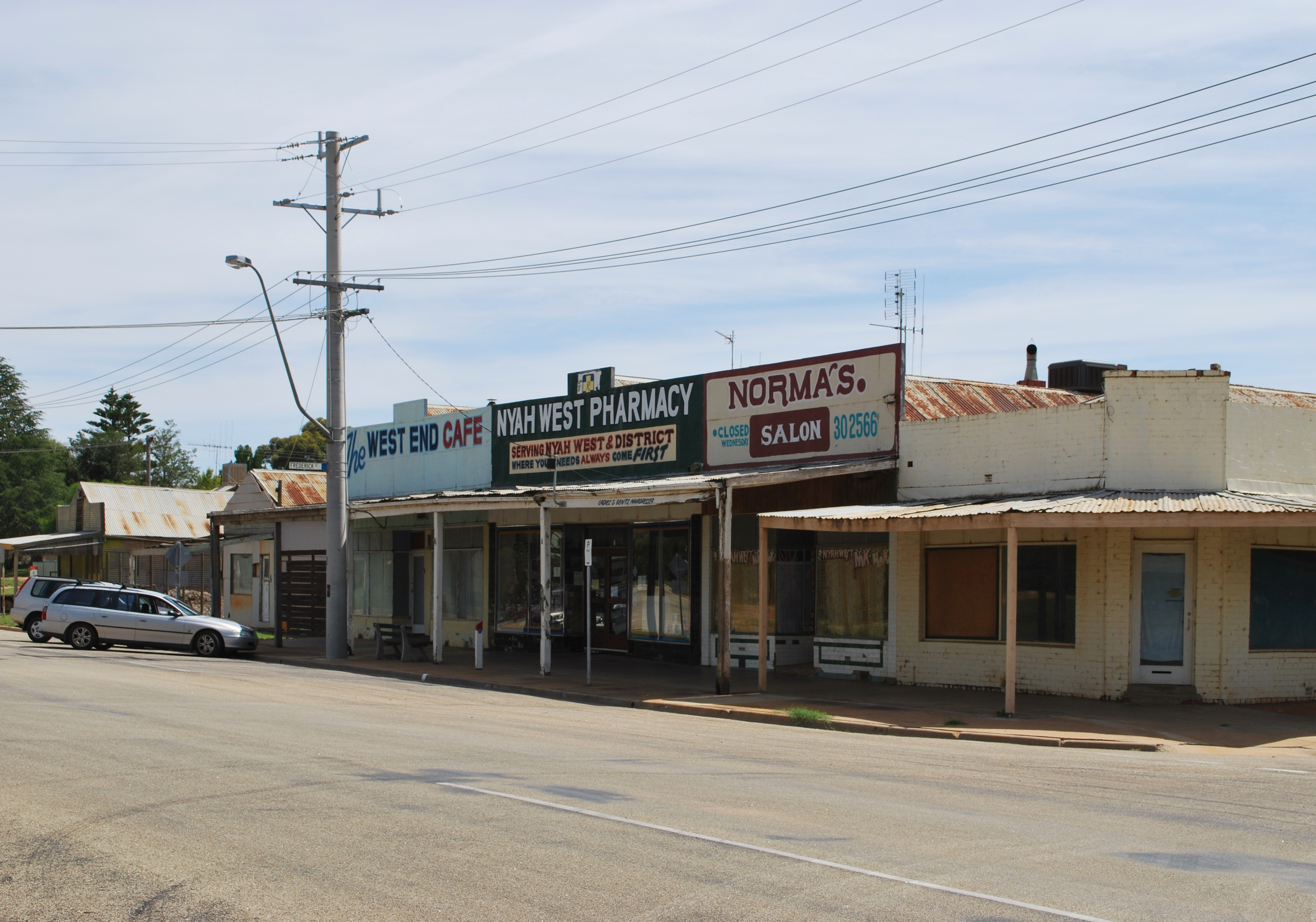
Pharmacy
