= Chillingollah =

Chillingollah Victoria
- Coordinates: 35°16′S 143°03′E
- Population: 5 (2016)
- Postcode(s): 3585
- Location: 399 km (248 mi) from Melbourne; 52 km (32 mi) from Swan Hill; 32 km (20 mi) from Manangatang; 85 km (53 mi) from Ouyen
- LGA(s): Rural City of Swan Hill
- State electorate(s): Victoria
Localities around Chillingollah:
| Chinkapook | Turoar | Turoar |
| Tyrrell Downs | Chillingollah | Polisbet |
| Tyrrell Downs | Waitchie | Waitchie |

Chillingollah is a locality in Victoria, Australia, located approximately 52 km from Swan Hill, Victoria.

Chillingollah Post Office opened on 1 July 1905 and closed in 1973.
