= Polisbet =

- Town
- Coordinates: 35°16′18″S 143°09′16″E
- Country: Australia
- State: Victoria
- LGA: Rural City of Swan Hill

Government
  - State electorate: Murray Plains
  - Federal division: Mallee

Population
  - Total: 5 (2016 census)
- Postcode: 3585
Localities around Polisbet
Turoar	Nyrraby	Nyrraby
Chillingollah	Polisbet	Nowie
Waitchie	Waitchie	Nowie

Polisbet is a locality located in the local government area of the Rural City of Swan Hill, Victoria, Australia.
