= Ultima Football Club =

Ultima Football / Netball Club

Names
- Full name: Ultima Football Netball Club
- Nickname: Storm
- Former nickname: Kangaroos

2025 season
- After finals: 2nd
- Home-and-away season: 2nd
- Leading goalkicker: Corey Grey (44)
- Best and fairest: Josh Dwyer

Club details
- Founded: 1905; 121 years ago
- Colours
- Competition: Central Murray Football League
- President: Nathan Condely
- Coach: Joel Donnan
- Captain: Thomas Bull
- Premierships: (14): 1924, 1930, 1933, 1981, 1983, 1991, 1994, 1996, 2002, 2003, 2004, 2014, 2015, 2024
- Ground: Ultima Recreation Reserve

Other information
- Official website: https://ultimafnc.com.au/

The Ultima Football Club, nicknamed the Storm, is an Australian rules football and netball club based in the town of Ultima, Victoria. The football team currently competes in the Central Murray Football Netball League (CMFNL).

== History ==
The club was founded in 1905 and has competed in several local competitions, such as the Quambatook, Mid Murray, Tyrrell, Kerang and District, and Golden Rivers Football Netball League (GRFNL).

Since joining the KDFL/GRFNL in 1979, Ultima has enjoyed ongoing success, including the most senior premierships during this time and back-to-back Tim Brockwell Champion Club Awards. The club's success was also recognised when they were ranked 46th in the Herald Sun's Top 50 Country Teams in Victoria.

In 2024, the club undertook a strategic review to ensure a strong future for generations to come. This process led to an application to join the Central Murray Football Netball League (CMFNL). In August 2025, the Central Rivers Board and AFL Central Victoria approved the club's transfer, with the Ultima Football Netball Club set to compete in the Central Murray Football Netball League from the 2026 season.

As part of this transition, the club adopted new colours and a new identity. Following a formal vote by members, at the end of the 2025 season the club farewelled the Roos and the GRFNL and proudly emerged ready to compete in the CMFNL as the Ultima Storm.

== Football Premierships ==
=== Northern DFA (1) ===
- 1924

=== Swan Hill FA (1) ===
- 1930

=== Lalbert-Manangatang FA (1) ===
- 1933

=== Kerang and District FL / Golden Rivers FL (11) ===
- 1981, 1983, 1991, 1994, 1996, 2002, 2003, 2004, 2014, 2015, 2024

== League Awards ==
=== League best and fairest ===
==== Kerang & District / Golden Rivers FL ====
- 1988: Evan Eilson
- 1993: Shane Ingram
- 1999: Dean Young
- 2003: Luke O'Toole
- 2005: Luke O'Toole
- 2013: Luke O'Toole
- 2014: Thomas Isma

=== League leading goalkicker ===
==== Kerang & District / Golden Rivers FL ====
- 1979: Steven Strevens (132 Goals)
- 1981: Brian Findlay (93 Goals)
- 1983: Steven Strevens (105 Goals)
- 1985: Steven Strevens (131 Goals)
- 1991: Dean Farrell (83 Goals)
- 2003: Brad Carroll (119 Goals)
- 2018: Arnold Kirby (84 Goals)
- 2019: Jack O'Rourke (80 Goals)
- 2024: Ryan Devereux (59 Goals)

== VFL/AFL Players ==
- Gus Petzke 2 Games at Richmond in 1923
- Hugh Carroll 9 Games at North Melbourne in 1932
- Cornelius O'Toole 4 Games at Melbourne in 1950
