= Wood Wood, Victoria =

Wood Wood Victoria
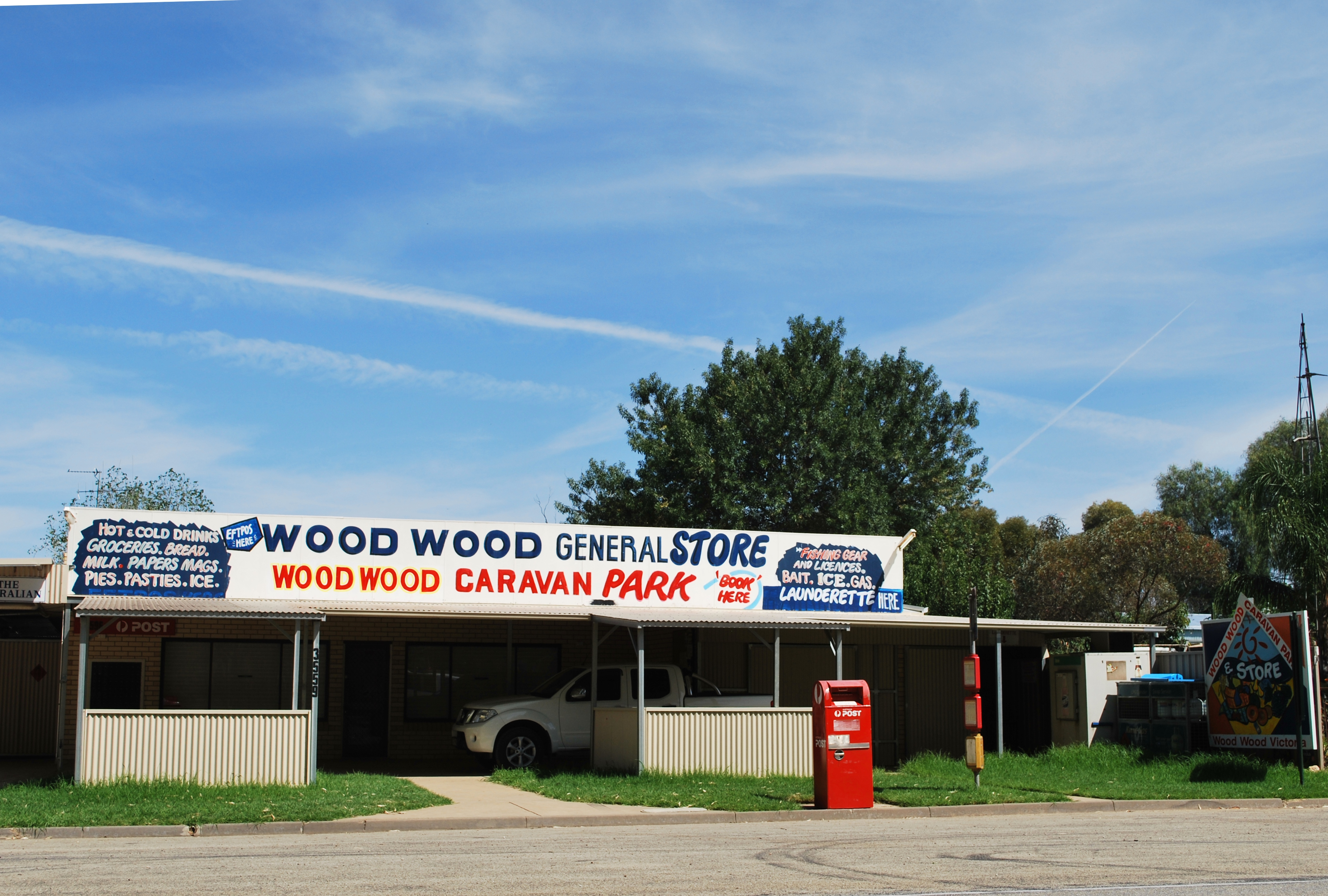
- General store

- Coordinates: 35°06′48″S 143°20′58″E
- Population: 85 (2016 census)
- Postcode(s): 3596
- LGA(s): Rural City of Swan Hill
- State electorate(s): Mildura
- Federal division(s): Mallee
Localities around Wood Wood:
Piangil	Piangil	New South Wales
Piangil	Wood Wood	New South Wales
Miralie	Miralie	Nyah

Wood Wood is a town in the Rural City of Swan Hill, Victoria, Australia.

== Business ==
Wood Wood Post Office opened on 17 December 1900 and was closed on 30 June 1987. Riverhaven Caravan Park provides accommodation for travellers and tourists visiting the area.

== See also ==
- List of reduplicated Australian place names
