= Tyntynder Football Club =

Tyntynder

Names
- Full name: Tyntynder Football Netball Club
- Nickname(s): Bulldogs
- Club song: 'The Boys From Tyntynder'

Club details
- Founded: 1919; 106 years ago
- Colours
- Competition: Central Murray Football League
- President: Peter Hawkins
- Coach: Jack O'Rourke
- Ground(s): Alan Garden Reserve, Swan Hill
- Former ground(s): Swan Hill Recreation Reserve, Tyntynder South Recreation Ground

Uniforms
Home

The Tyntynder Football Netball Club, nicknamed the Bulldogs, is an Australian rules football and netball club based in the Central Murray Football League. They won three premierships in a row from 1997–99, and also won the 2006 and 2007 Night Series (pre-season).

From 2004-06 the Under 15's won 3 premierships in a row. In 2002 and 2004 the Under 11's side won premierships. The under 11's side came third in 2005 and 2006 while the Under 13's were runner-up in 2005 and won the premiership in 2006. In 2018, the Under 14.5 team were runners-up, and in 2019 and 2022 they finished third, losing to Kerang and Lake Boga respectively.

== Early history ==
Tyntynder was formed in 1919. The club fielded a side in the Swan Hill Association in 1920 and 1921. They reformed in 1929 and fielded a side in the reconstituted Swan Hill Association . With the inclusion of Kerang and Mystic Park the competition began the Northern Districts FL in 1933. Tyntynder won the premiership in 1935, 1936 and 1937. The club finished up because of the Second World War in 1940.

In 1947 the club reformed and joined the Mid Murray Football League. This league was replaced by the Central Murray Football League in 1997.

== Premierships ==
League	Total flags	Premiership year(s)
Northern Districts FL	3	1935, 1936, 1937,
Mid Murray Football League	10	1947, 1955, 1958, 1959, 1973, 1980, 1983, 1984, 1986, 1987
Central Murray Football League	3	1997, 1998, 1999
