= David Simpson (footballer, born 1963) =

Australian rules footballer

Personal information
- Full name: David Simpson
- Born: 31 March 1963 (age 63)
- Original team: Nyah West
- Height: 178 cm (5 ft 10 in)
- Weight: 69 kg (152 lb)

Playing career^{1}
Years	Club	Games (Goals)
1984–85	Richmond	2 (1)
- ^{1} Playing statistics correct to the end of 1985.

David Simpson (born 31 March 1963) is a former Australian rules footballer who played with Richmond in the Victorian Football League (VFL).
