= Piangil =

Piangil Victoria
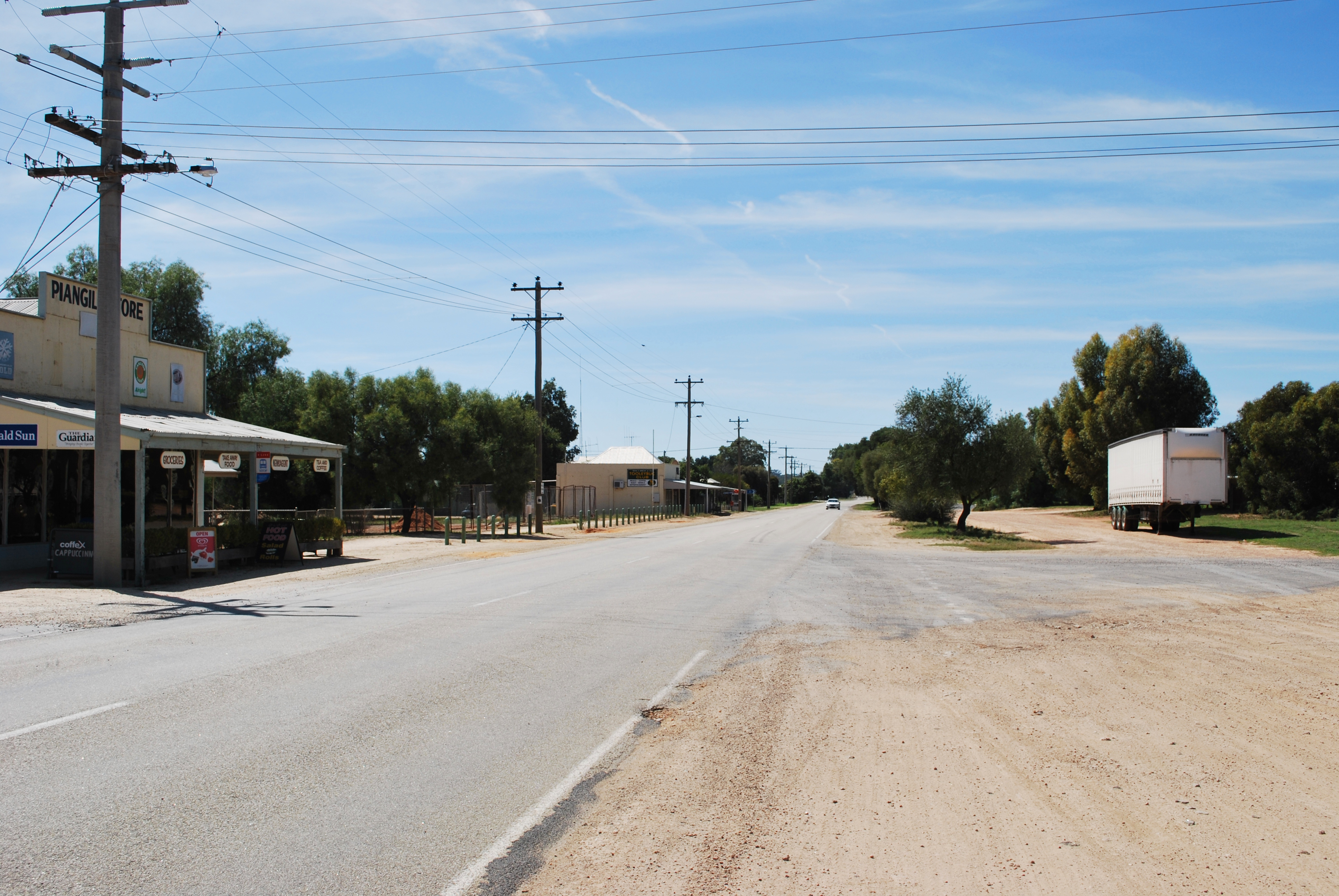
- Murray St (Mallee Highway), the main street of Piangil, 2012

- Coordinates: 35°03′0″S 143°18′0″E
- Population: 259 (2016 census)
- Postcode(s): 3597
- Location: 382 km (237 mi) NW of Melbourne; 46 km (29 mi) NW of Swan Hill
- LGA(s): Rural City of Swan Hill
- State electorate(s): Mildura
- Federal division(s): Mallee
Localities around Piangil:
Natya	Natya	New South Wales
Manangatang	Piangil	New South Wales
Turoar	Towan	Wood Wood, Miralie

Piangil, once frequently spelled "Pyangil", is a town in the Mallee region of northern Victoria, Australia. It is approximately 382 kilometres (237 mi) north-west of the state capital, Melbourne and 46 kilometres (29 mi) north-west of the regional centre of Swan Hill. At the 2016 census, Piangil and the surrounding rural area had a population of 259.

The name of the town is derived from the Piangil pastoral run, taken up in 1846 by William Coghill. It is thought that the name was derived from an Aboriginal word for the Murray cod.

Piangil post office opened on 17 June 1907, and was renamed Piangil North in 1918 when the Piangil post office was relocated adjacent to the railway station. A new Piangil post office opened in 1921 and is still in operation.

Piangil Primary School closed in September 2015.

== Gallery ==
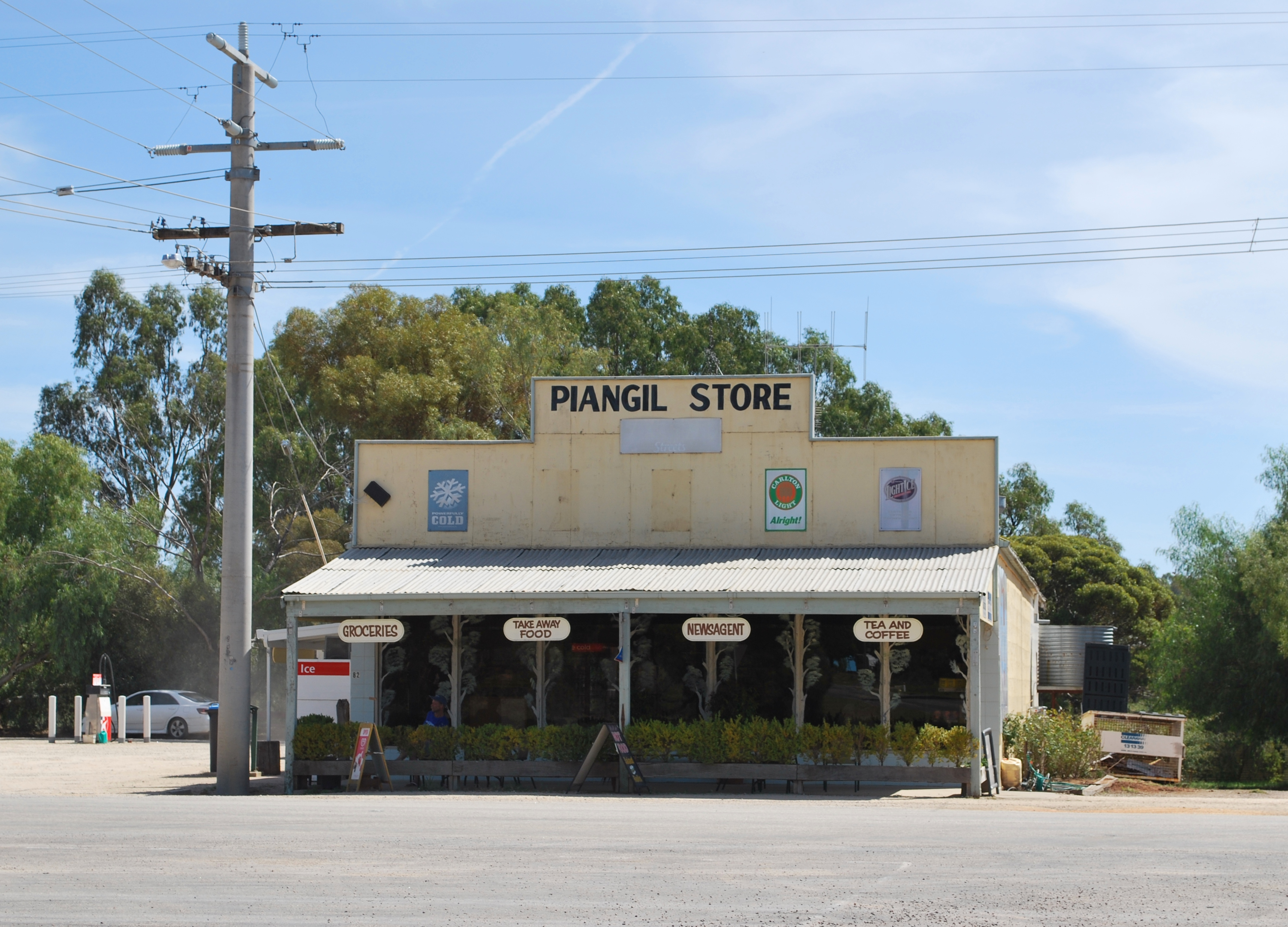
General store, 2012

Grain storage, 2009

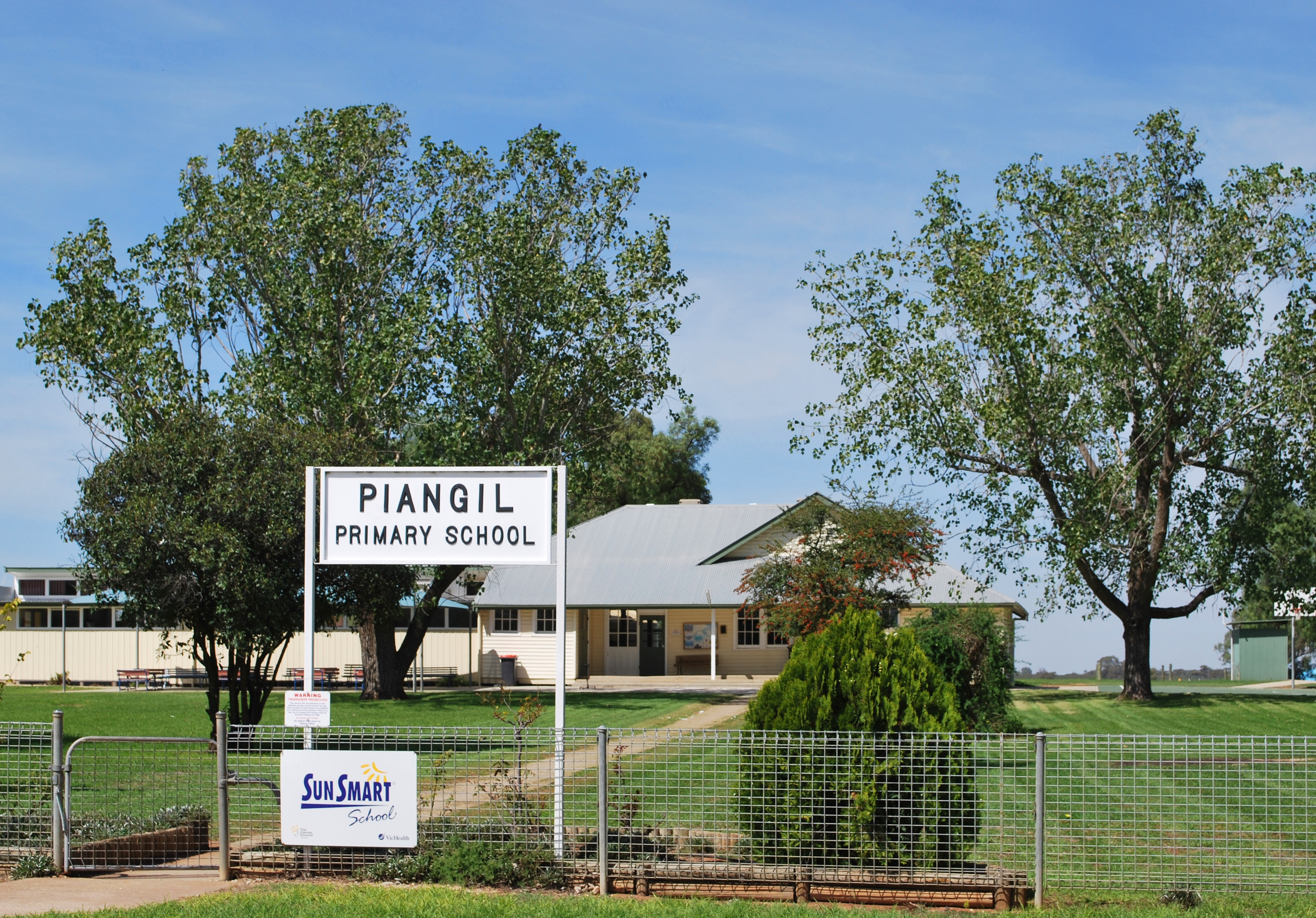
Former Primary school, 2012

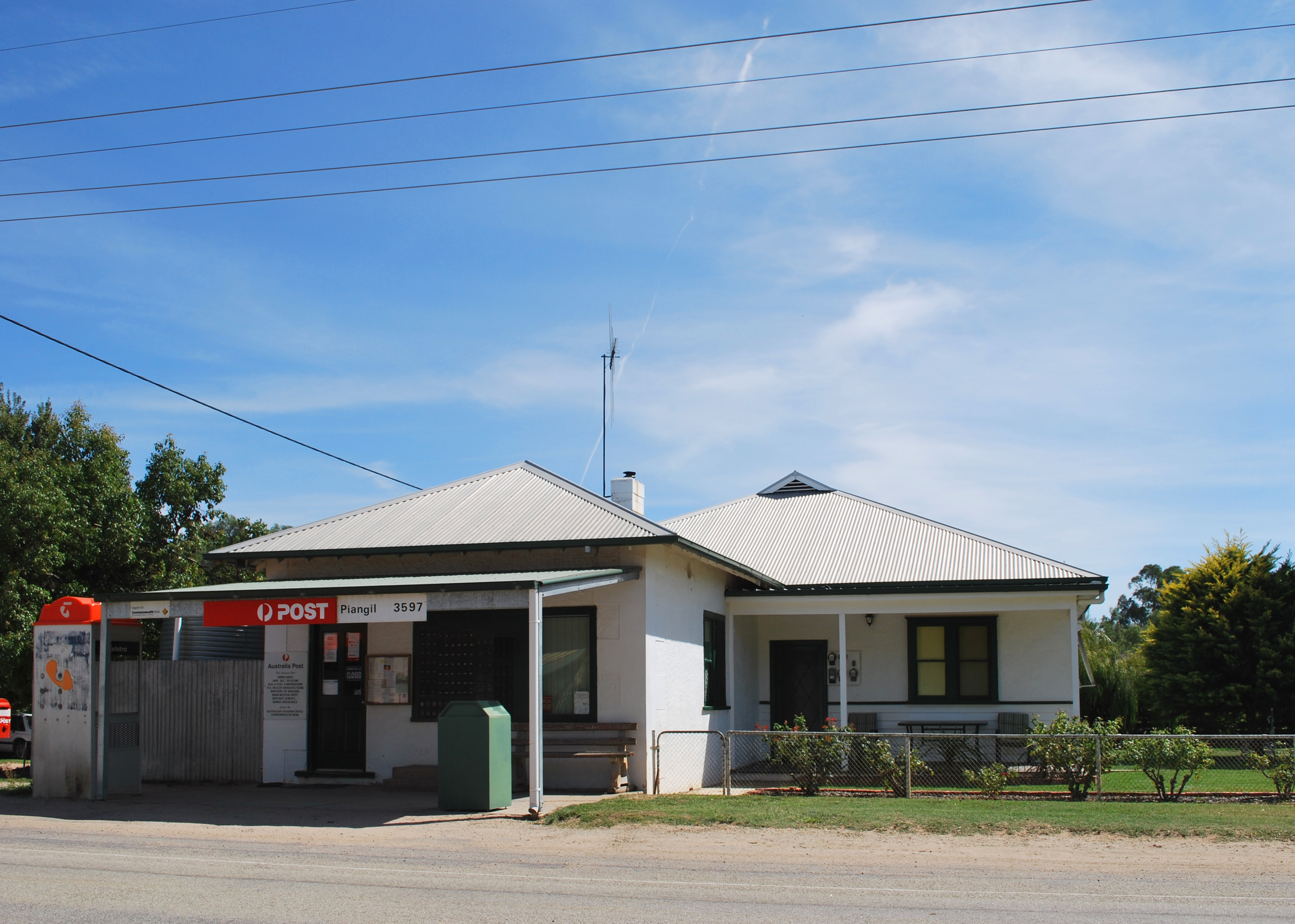
Post office, 2012

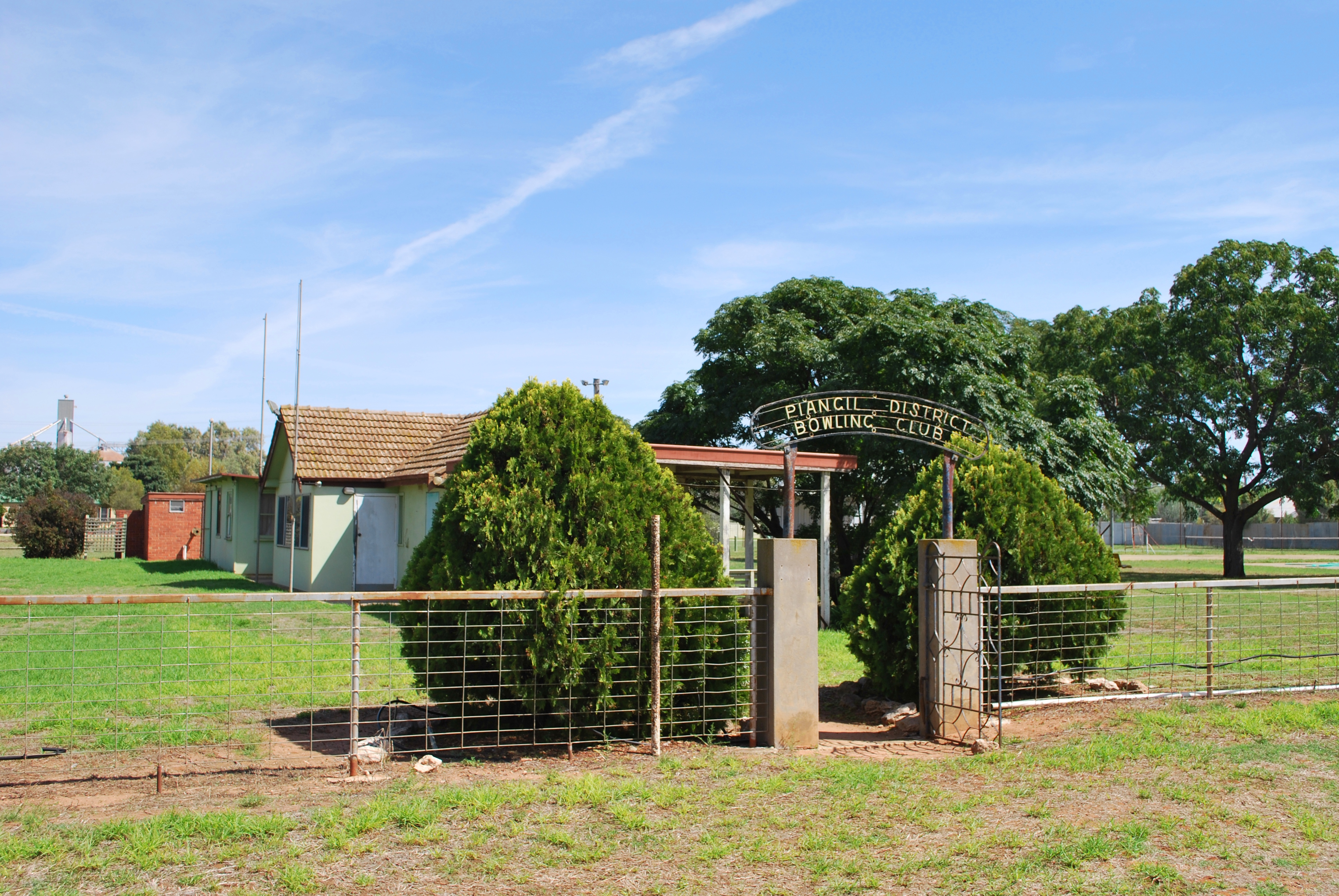
Former bowling club, 2012
