= Torrumbarry =

Torrumbarry Victoria
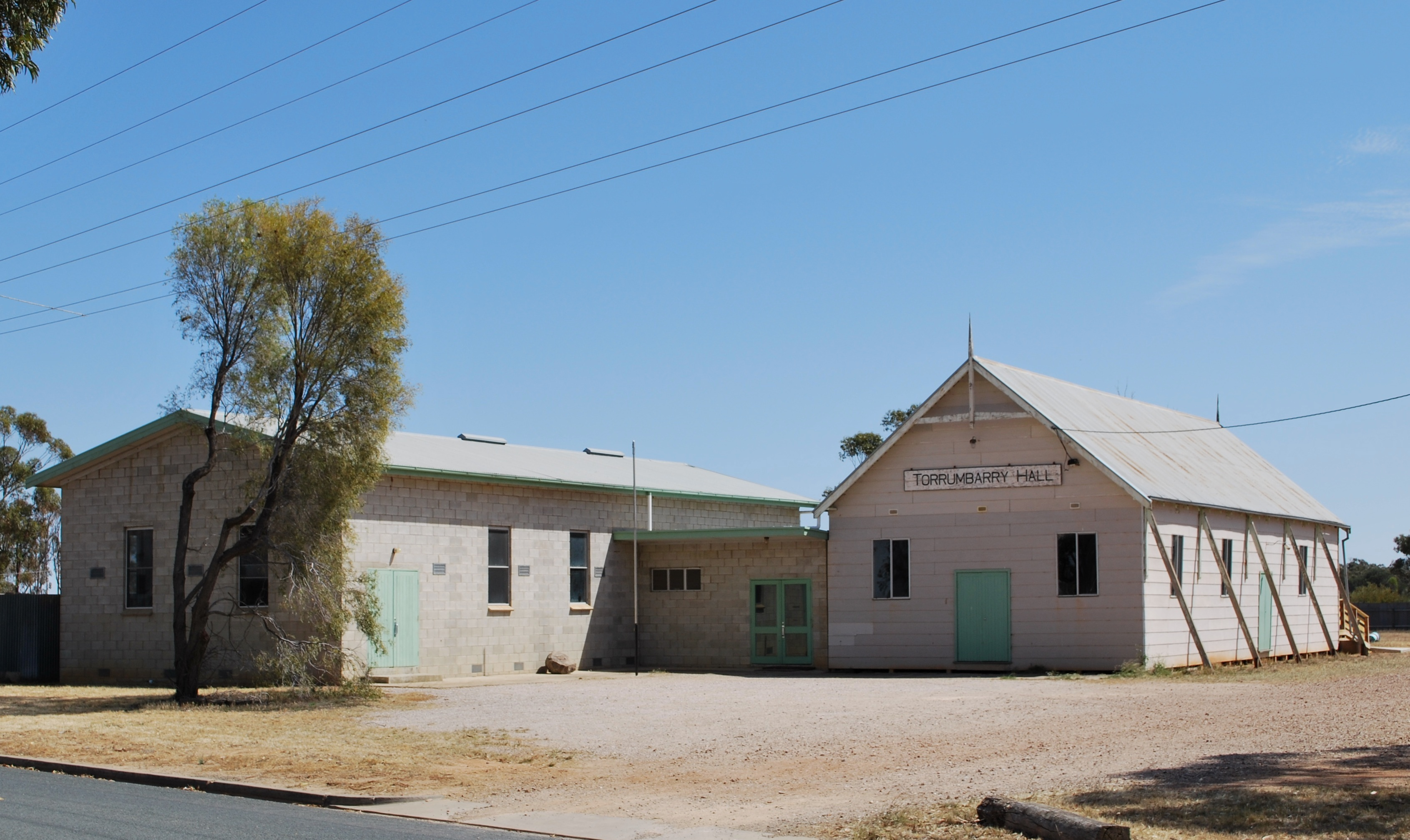
- Torrumbarry Hall

- Coordinates: 36°02′0″S 144°33′0″E
- Population: 279 (2016 census)
- Postcode(s): 3562
- Location: 241 km (150 mi) N of Melbourne; 96 km (60 mi) NW of Shepparton; 26 km (16 mi) NW of Echuca
- LGA(s): Shire of Campaspe
- State electorate(s): Murray Plains
- Federal division(s): Nicholls

Torrumbarry /təˈrʌmbəri/ is a town in northern Victoria, Australia. The town is in the Shire of Campaspe local government area and on the Murray Valley Highway, 241 kilometres (150 mi) north of the state capital, Melbourne. At the 2016 census, Torrumbarry had a population of 279. The town was once large but shrank over time. The town still houses a hotel, a hall, a general store and a post office.

== Weir ==
The town is home to an important weir situated on the Murray River, a few kilometres north of the township. The weir was built in the 1920s. It operated efficiently until 1992 when it was damaged extensively. After numerous unsuccessful repairs, it was decided the weir would be rebuilt with a new design that was completed during 1996. An information centre was built outlining the importance and history of the weir. A post office was built at the weir in 1919 but closed 5 years later due to the fact it was rarely used.

== Gallery ==
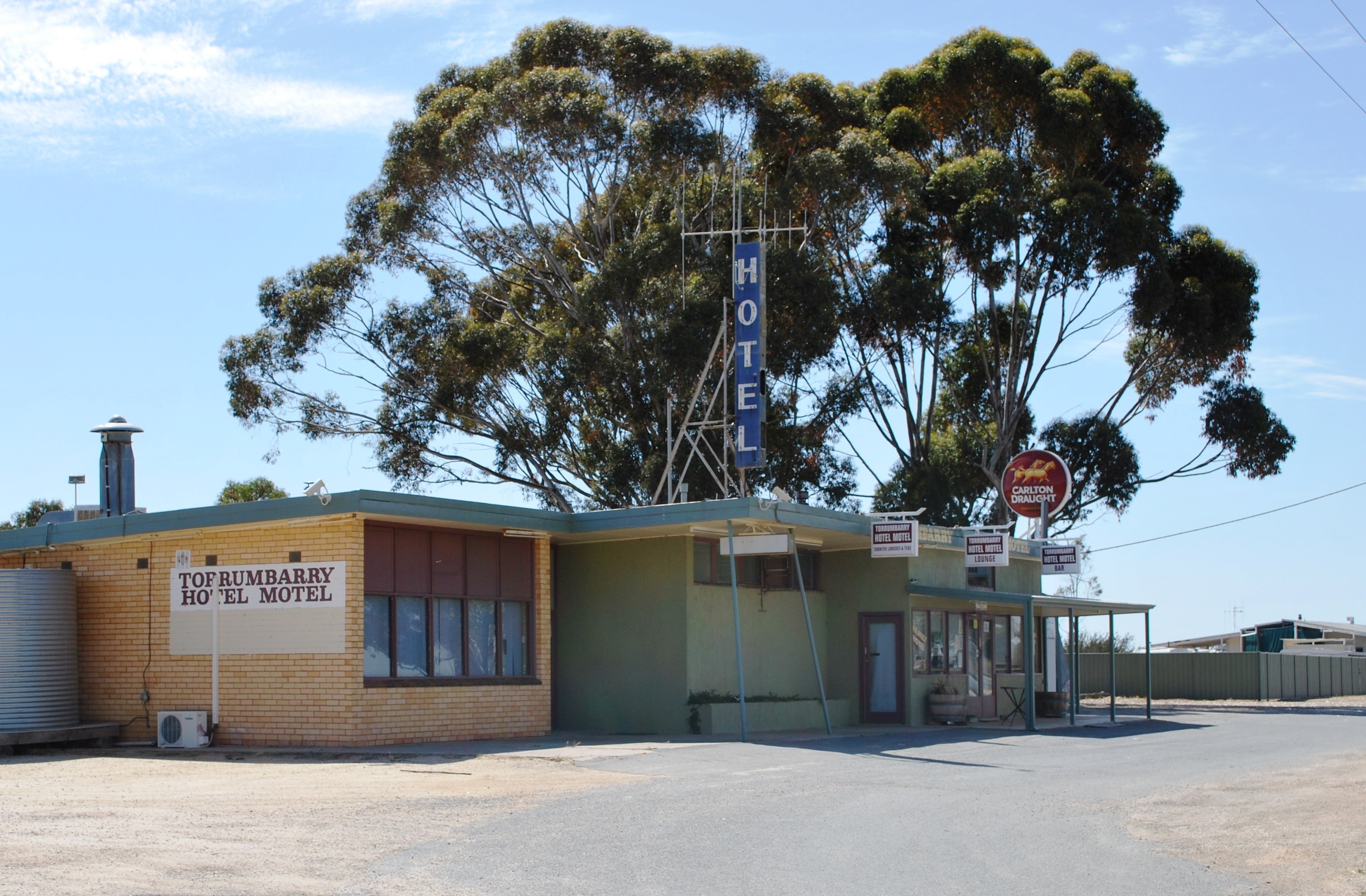
Torumbarry Hotel

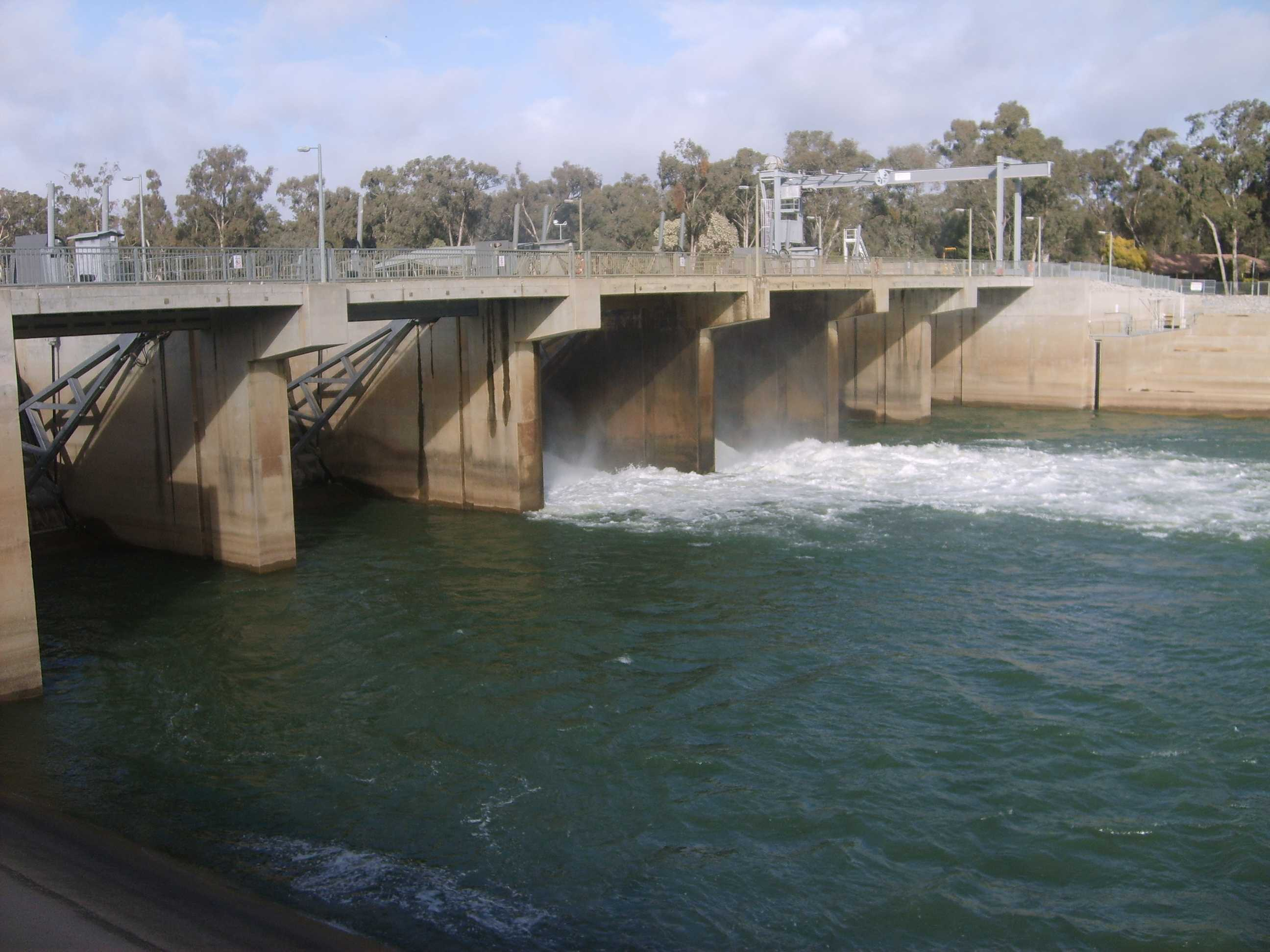
Torumbarry Weir
