= Leitchville =

- Town
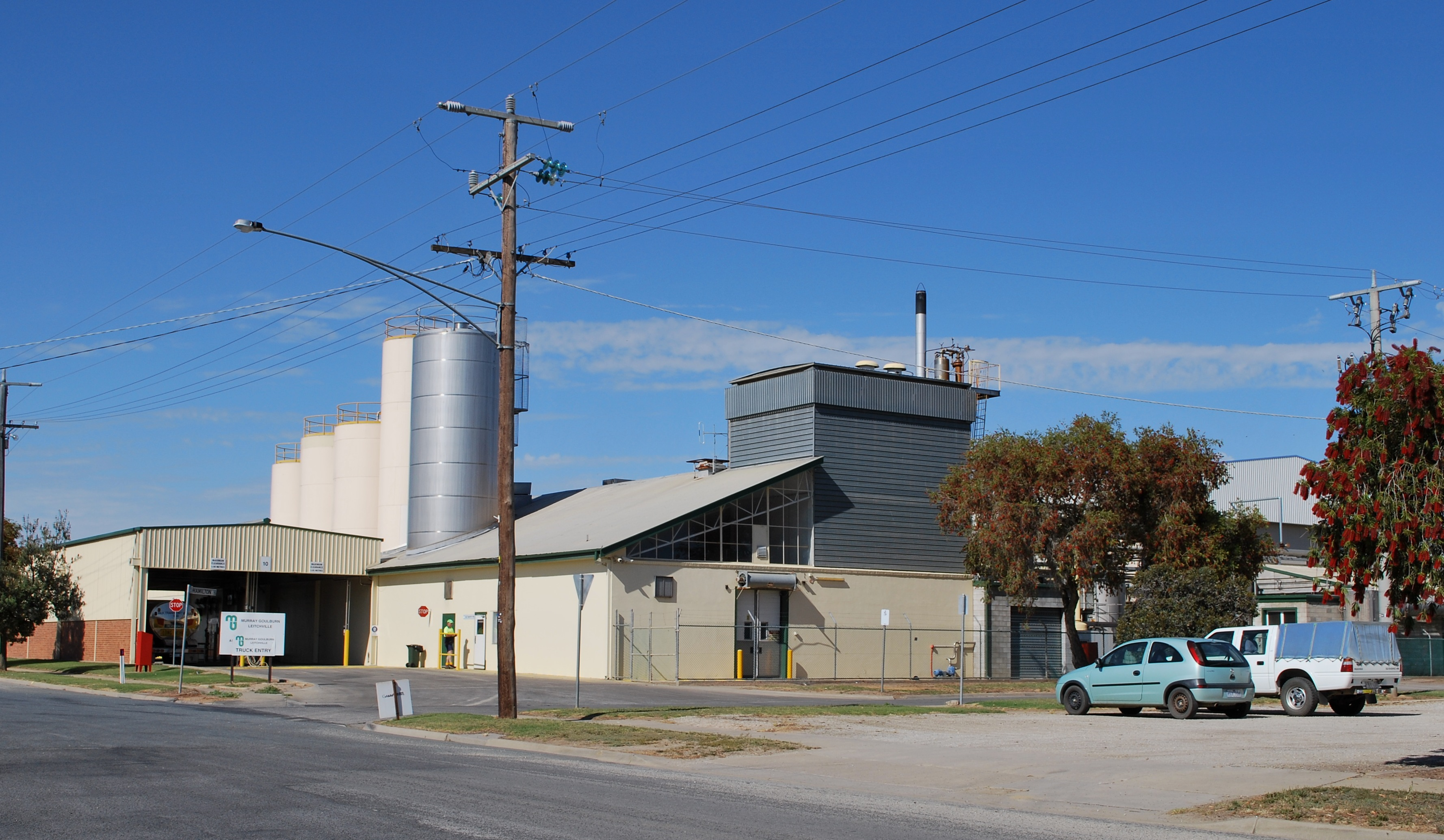
- Murray-Goulburn dairy

- Coordinates: 35°54′0″S 144°17′0″E
- Country: Australia
- State: Victoria
- LGA: Shire of Gannawarra
- Location: 262 km (163 mi) NW of Melbourne; 108 km (67 mi) SE of Swan Hill; 49 km (30 mi) SE of Kerang; 17 km (11 mi) SE of Cohuna
- Established: 1929

Government
  - State electorate: Murray Plains
  - Federal division: Mallee

Population
  - Total: 558 (2016 census)
- Postcode: 3567

Leitchville is a town in northern Victoria, Australia. The town is in the Shire of Gannawarra local government area, 262 kilometres from the state capital, Melbourne. At the 2016 census, Leitchville had a population of 558.

== History ==
The district was named after the manager of Gunbower station, Duncan Leitch, following his death in 1887, and the Post Office opened on 1 October 1887. The township was gazetted in 1929. Many locals have now been pushing the council for the new name of Margaritaville to entice more tourism for business.

== The town today ==
The major industry in Leitchville is dairy production; a Murray Goulburn cheese factory was located in the town, but closed in February 2010, with the loss of 80 jobs. Kow Swamp, the site of a major palaeontological find providing insight into the origins of Indigenous Australians is located nearby.

The town in conjunction with neighbouring township Gunbower has an Australian Rules football team competing in the Heathcote District Football League.
