= Gunbower =

Gunbower Victoria
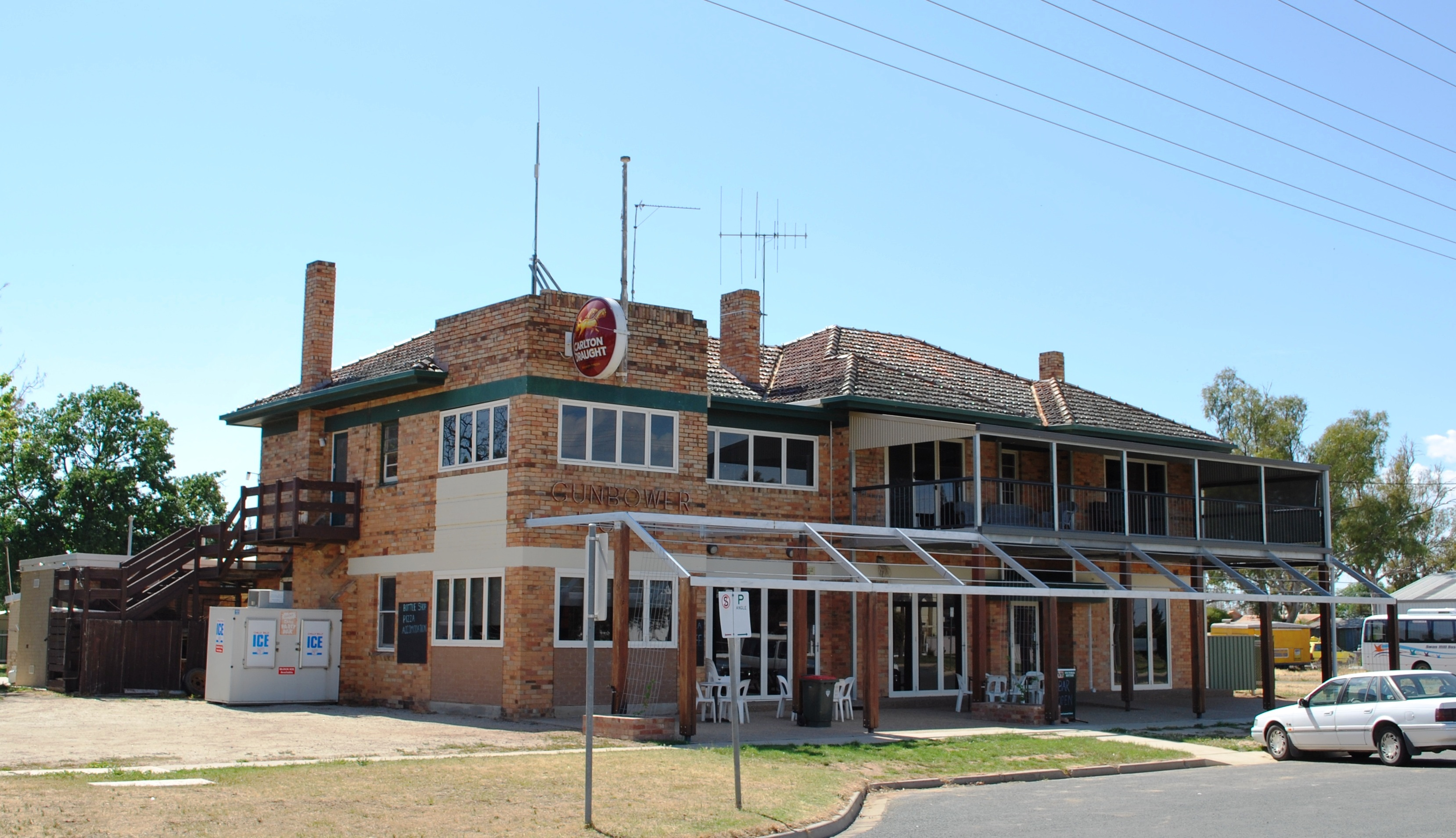
- Gunbower Hotel

- Coordinates: 35°57′26″S 144°22′14″E
- Population: 578 (2021 census)
- Postcode(s): 3566
- Location: 272 km (169 mi) N of Melbourne; 42 km (26 mi) NW of Echuca; 23 km (14 mi) SE of Cohuna
- LGA(s): Shire of Campaspe
- State electorate(s): Murray Plains
- Federal division(s): Nicholls
Localities around Gunbower:
	Leitchville
	Gunbower
Pyramid Hill		Patho

Gunbower is a town in northern Victoria, Australia. The town is located in the Shire of Campaspe, 272 kilometres (169 mi) north of the state capital, Melbourne on the banks of Gunbower Creek. At the 2021 census, Gunbower had a population of 578.

Gunbower Post Office opened on 8 March 1876.

Gunbower has a horse racing club, the Gunbower Racing Club, which holds the Gunbower Cup meeting in October (the only meeting for the year).
