= Boga Lake =

Boga Lake can refer to:

- Lake Boga (Victoria), a lake in Victoria, Australia
- Lake Boga, Victoria, a town located adjacent to the lake
  - Lake Boga railway station
  - Lake Boga Flying Boat Base
  - Lake Boga mission
- Boga Lake (Bangladesh), a lake in Bandarban, Bangladesh

== See also ==
- Boga (disambiguation)
