= Lake Boga (Victoria) =

Lake in Swan Hill Rural City, Victoria, Australia

- Boga Lake
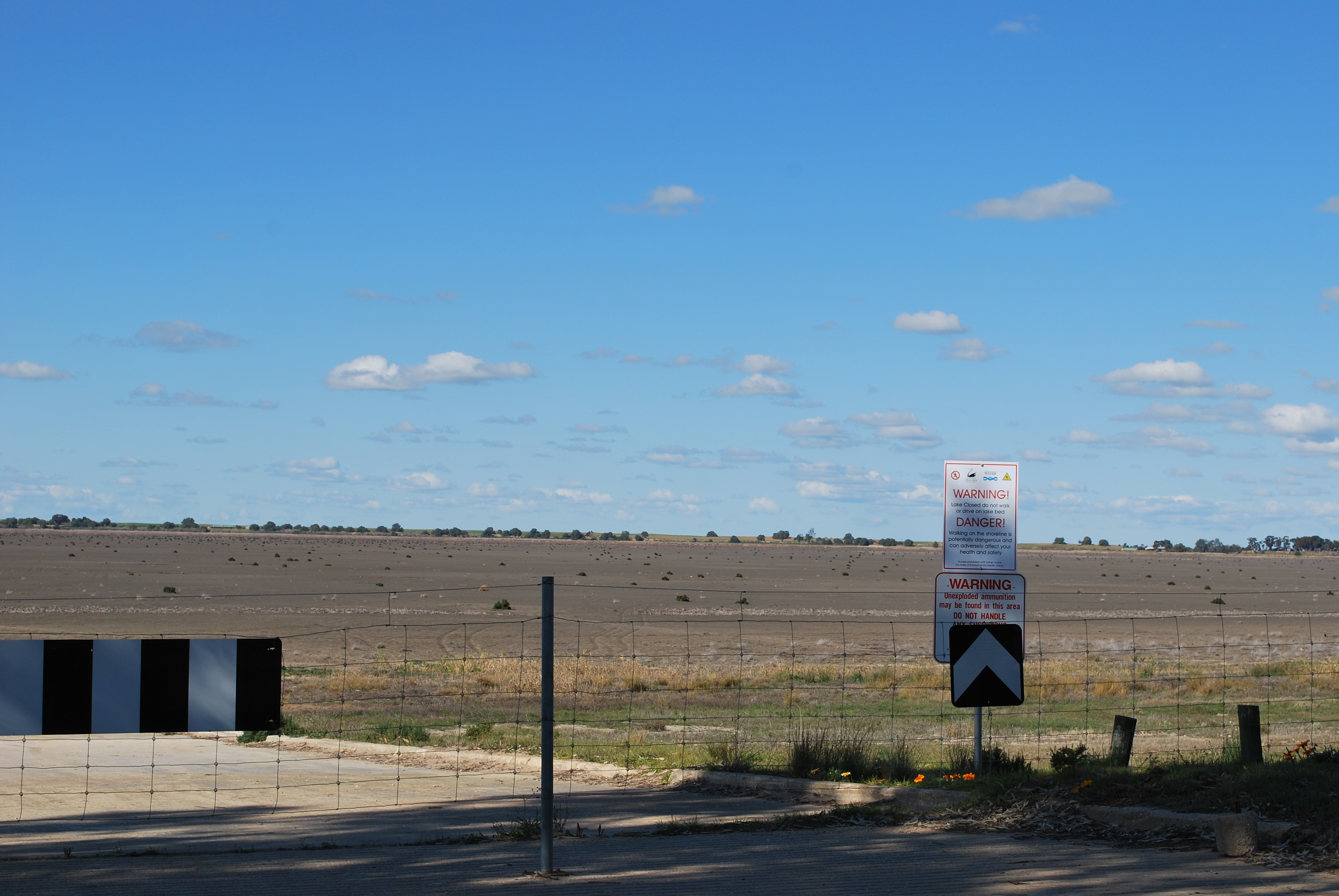
- The empty lake, pictured in 2009.

- Location in Victoria
- Location: The Mallee, Victoria
- Coordinates: 35°26′59.6″S 143°38′40.2″E
- Type: Freshwater endorheic water storage
- Primary outflows: outfall channel to the Little Murray River
- Basin countries: Australia
- Managing agency: Goulburn–Murray Water
- Surface area: 940 ha (2,300 acres)
- Max. depth: 2 metres (6 ft 7 in)
- Water volume: 37,794 megalitres (8.314×10^{9} imp gal; 9.984×10^{9} US gal)
- Surface elevation: 69.5 metres (228 ft) AHD

Lake Boga ( /ˈleɪk ˈboʊɡə/), a freshwater endorheic lake that is managed by Goulburn–Murray Water as a water storage, is part of the Victorian Mid Murray Storages, is located near Swan Hill in The Mallee region of Victoria, in southeastern Australia. The 940-hectare (2,300-acre) lake is situated about 19 kilometres (12 mi) southeast of Swan Hill and adjacent to the town of the same name.

During World War II, Lake Boga was used as a repair and service depot for flying boats at the Lake Boga Flying Boat Base which was established in June 1942 and closed in November 1947.

== Water storage ==
Lake Boga has a capacity of 37,794 megalitres (8.314×10^{9} imp gal; 9.984×10^{9} US gal) at the full supply level of 69.5 metres (228 ft) AHD and a surface area of 940 hectares (2,300 acres). Under normal operation, water levels in Lake Boga vary between levels of 69.5 metres (228 ft) AHD and 67.22 metres (220.5 ft) AHD. At the level of 67.22 metres (220.5 ft) AHD, there is a depth of up to 2 metres (6 ft 7 in) of water in the deepest parts of the lake. Although operation and lake levels will vary from season to season, in general water will be harvested into Lake Boga during the winter and spring months. Subject to sufficient water to harvest, the lake generally will be full around November to December.

In 2009, after a period of the lake being dry, water started flowing into the lake during 2010, and by 2011, the lake was one of many rivers and water storage facilities in Victoria that was flooded as a result of the 2011 Victorian floods.

== See also ==
- List of lakes of Victoria
