= Stratford, Victoria =

Stratford
- Town
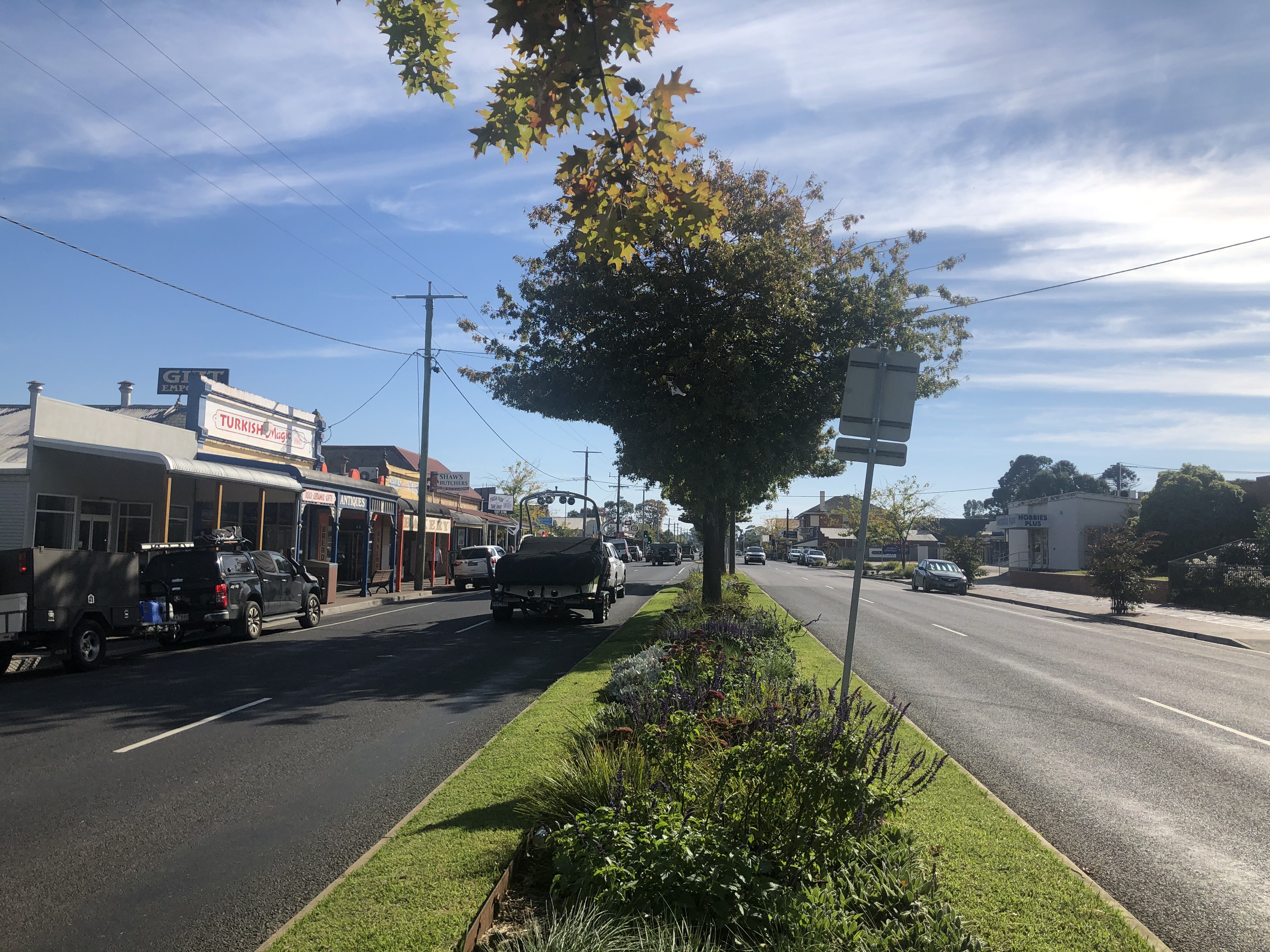
- Main shopping strip in Stratford

- Coordinates: 37°58′S 147°05′E
- Country: Australia
- State: Victoria
- LGA: Shire of Wellington
- Location: 232 km (144 mi) E of Melbourne; 18 km (11 mi) N of Sale; 12 km (7.5 mi) E of Maffra; 48 km (30 mi) W of Bairnsdale

Government
  - State electorate: Gippsland East
  - Federal division: Gippsland
- Elevation: 22 m (72 ft)

Population
  - Total: 2,980 (2021 census)
- Postcode: 3862
- Mean max temp: 21.1 °C (70.0 °F)
- Mean min temp: 7.4 °C (45.3 °F)
- Annual rainfall: 637.4 mm (25.09 in)

Stratford is a town on the Avon River in Victoria, Australia, 232 kilometres (144 mi) east of Melbourne on the Princes Highway in Shire of Wellington. At the 2021 census, Stratford had a population of 2,980. The town services the local regional community and travellers on the Princes Highway. Stratford's principal industries are dairying, sheep, cattle and horse breeding and vegetable crops. The town has numerous coffee shops and cafes, a cellar door for a local winery, Design Gallery, model railway shop, a pub, parks and playgrounds for car travelers to break their journey.

== Town name ==
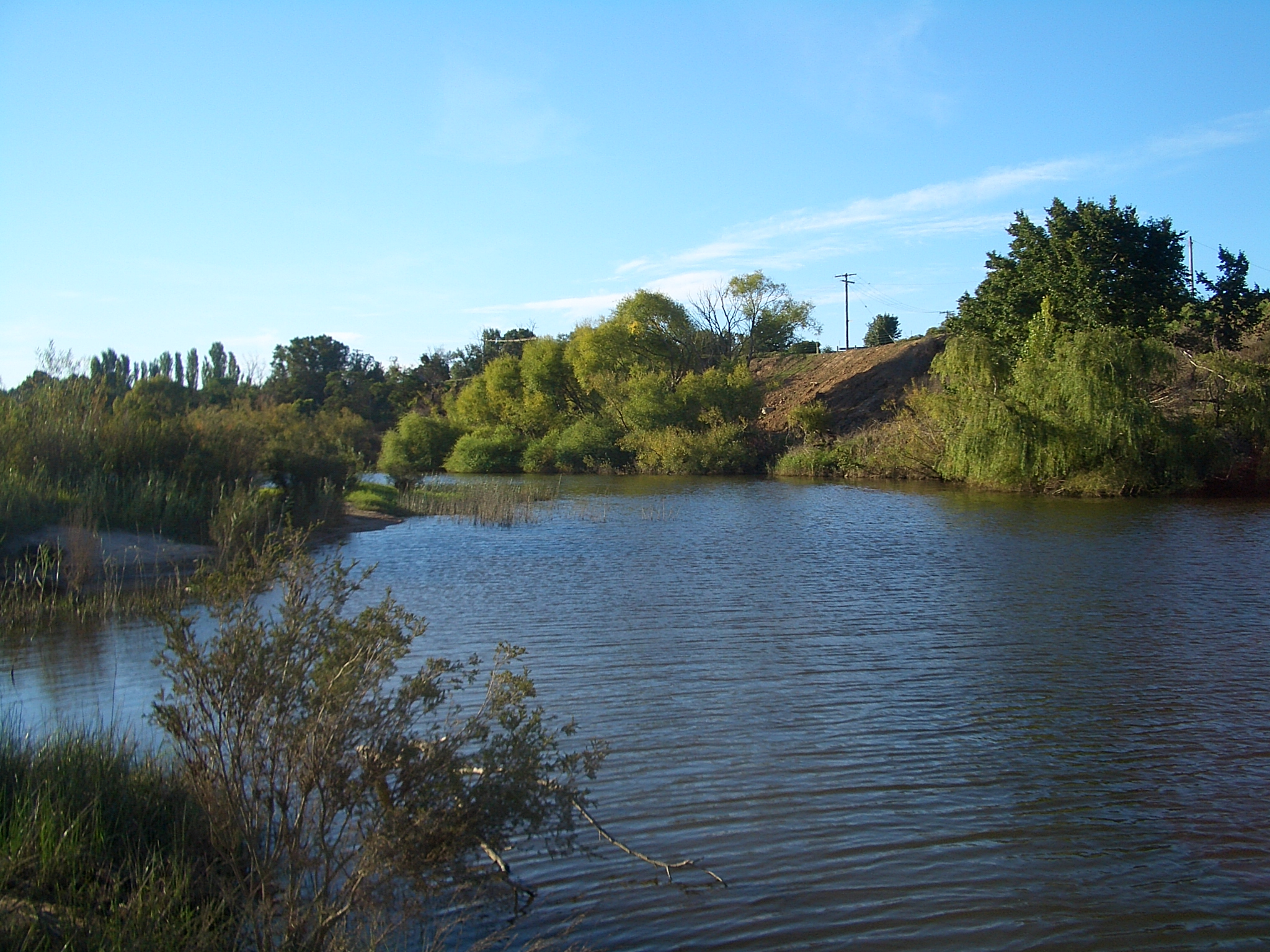
On the Avon River by Stratford

The origin of the town's name is unclear. Many believe it derives from Stratford-upon-Avon in England, William Shakespeare's birthplace, a view which is lent credence by the fact that it is located by the river Avon, although the name of the river Avon comes from a Scottish river. Locals have embraced the connection with Shakespeare and a Shakespeare on the River Festival has been a successful annual event since 1989, incorporating works of Shakespeare and modern Australian plays. In 1998 the town formally became a member of the Stratford Sister Cities program to promote friendship and cultural exchange between participating countries.

== Geography ==
The River Avon has a local reputation as a source for river polished gemstones, particularly agate, and for rapidly rising during increased rainfall upstream.

Three kilometres south-east of Stratford is a 56-hectare (140-acre) park called Knob Reserve (formerly known as the "Forest of Arden"), part of the Gunai/Kurnai Bataluk Cultural Trail, which winds its way through East Gippsland, highlighting the places of cultural significance to the first inhabitants. There are picnic facilities and an annual country music festival is held at Knob Reserve.

Stratford has a railway station on the Bairnsdale railway line, which was reopened for passenger use in 2004. The Howitt Bicycle Trail passes through Stratford.

== Sports ==
The town has an Australian rules football team, nicknamed the Swans; who have been competing in the East Gippsland Football League since 2012. They had previously competed in the North Gippsland Football League from 2004 to 2011. The town has a cricket team competing in the Sale-Maffra Cricket Association. They have won 4 A-Grade premierships since reforming in 1978.

== History ==
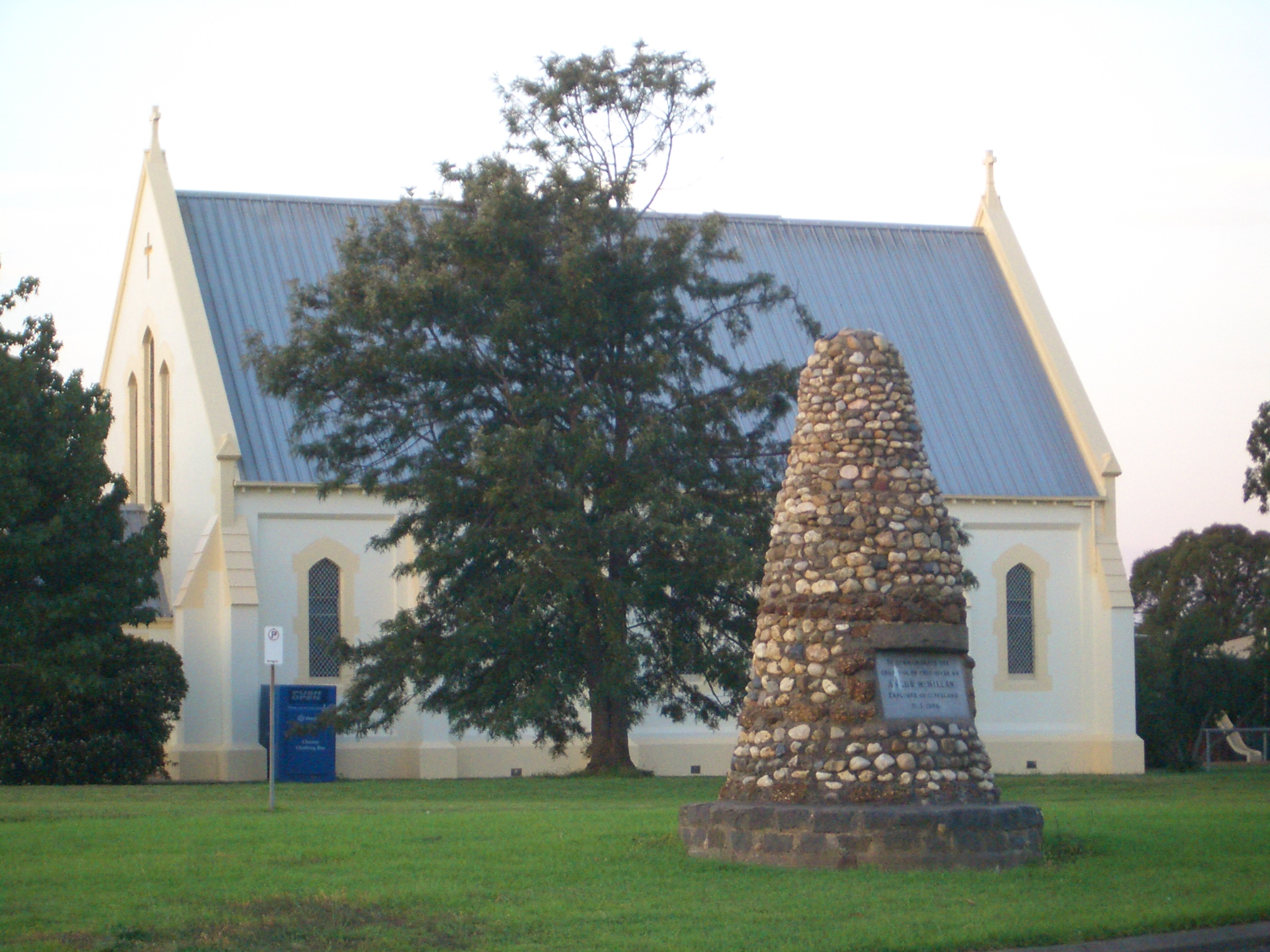
A church and a memorial to Angus McMillan

The land around the Avon River was occupied by the Brayakuloong people of the Gunai/Kurnai indigenous nation for thousands of years prior to European settlement.

Angus McMillan named the Avon River after the river of the same name in his native Scotland. In 1840 he established a pastoral run at Bushy Park, north-west of the township. William Odell Raymond established a run in the area in 1842, and built his house, Strathfieldsaye, during 1848–54. European settlement did not take place without resistance, and in return, massacres were inflicted by Angus McMillan and others on Gunai people, especially between the years of 1840 and 1850.

The township was established in the late 1850s and the Post Office opened on 1 May 1858.

With the 1860s gold rush to the Omeo and Dargo goldfields, the town of Stratford prospered. Historic buildings include the RSL Hall (1866), the Church of Holy Trinity (1868), the Methodist Church (1873), and the Post Office (1884).

In 1863 Reverend Friedrich Hagenauer established Ramahyuck Mission on the banks of the Avon River near Lake Wellington to house the Ganai survivors from west and central Gippsland. The name combines "Ramah", the home of Samuel in the First Book of Kings, with "yuck", an Aboriginal term reputedly meaning "our place". The mission sought to discourage all tribal ritual and culture, and replace it with Christian values and European customs. The Mission closed in 1908 and the few remaining residents were moved to Lake Tyers Mission.

Reverend Hagenauer's son Dr Henry Hagenauer was a top local Australian rules footballer who played one match for Victorian Football League (VFL) club Melbourne in 1898.

== Gallery ==
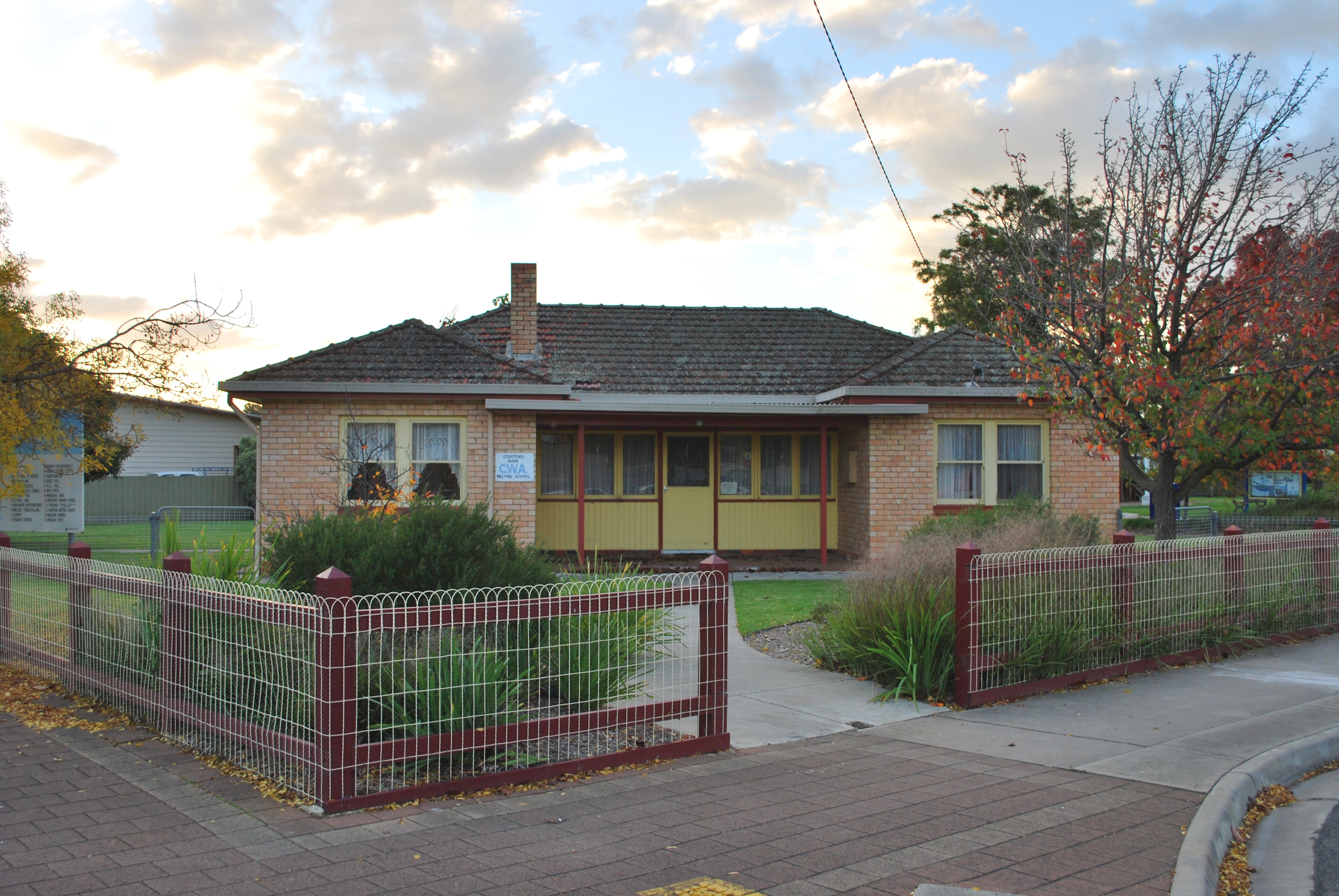
CWA rooms

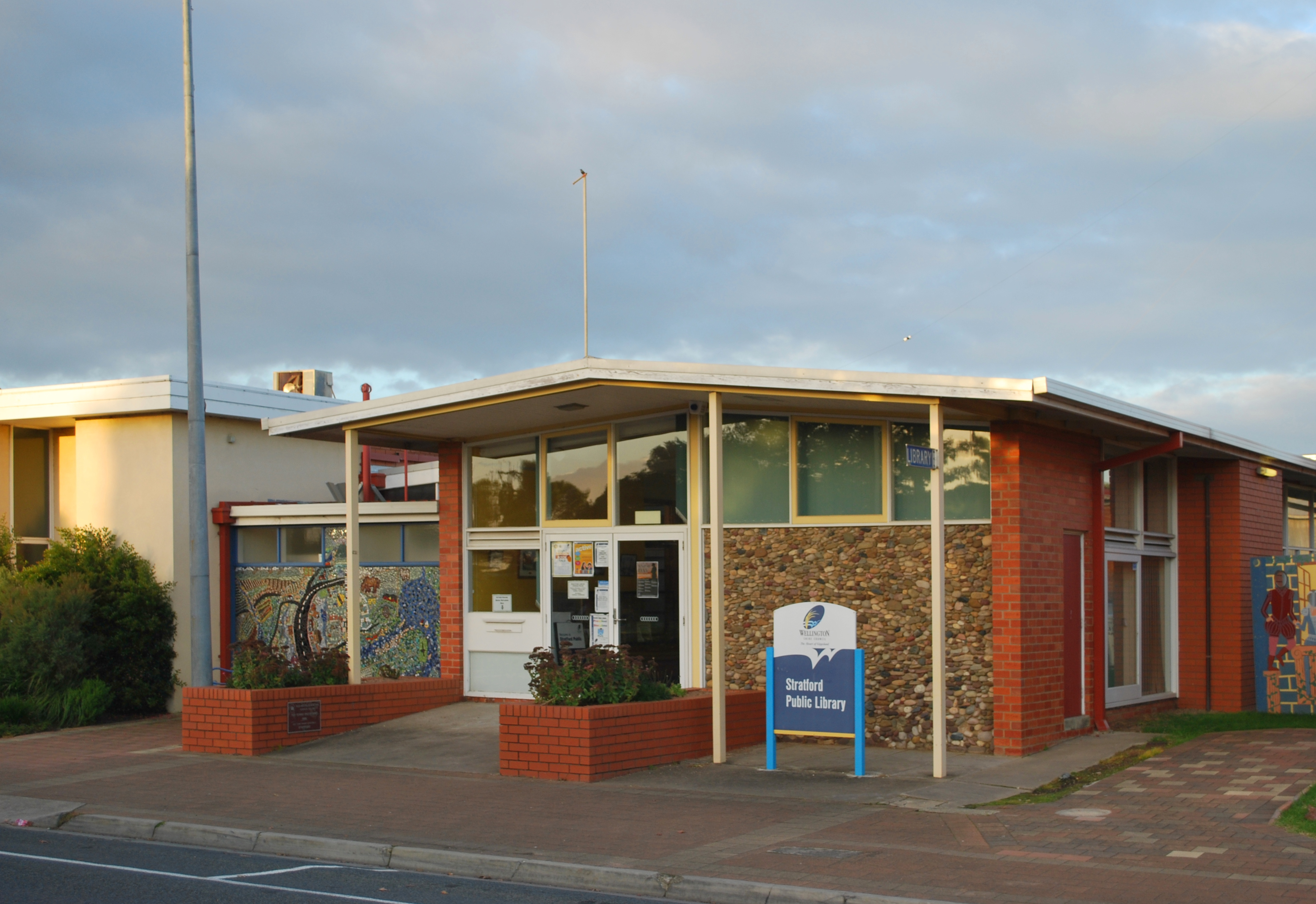
Council library

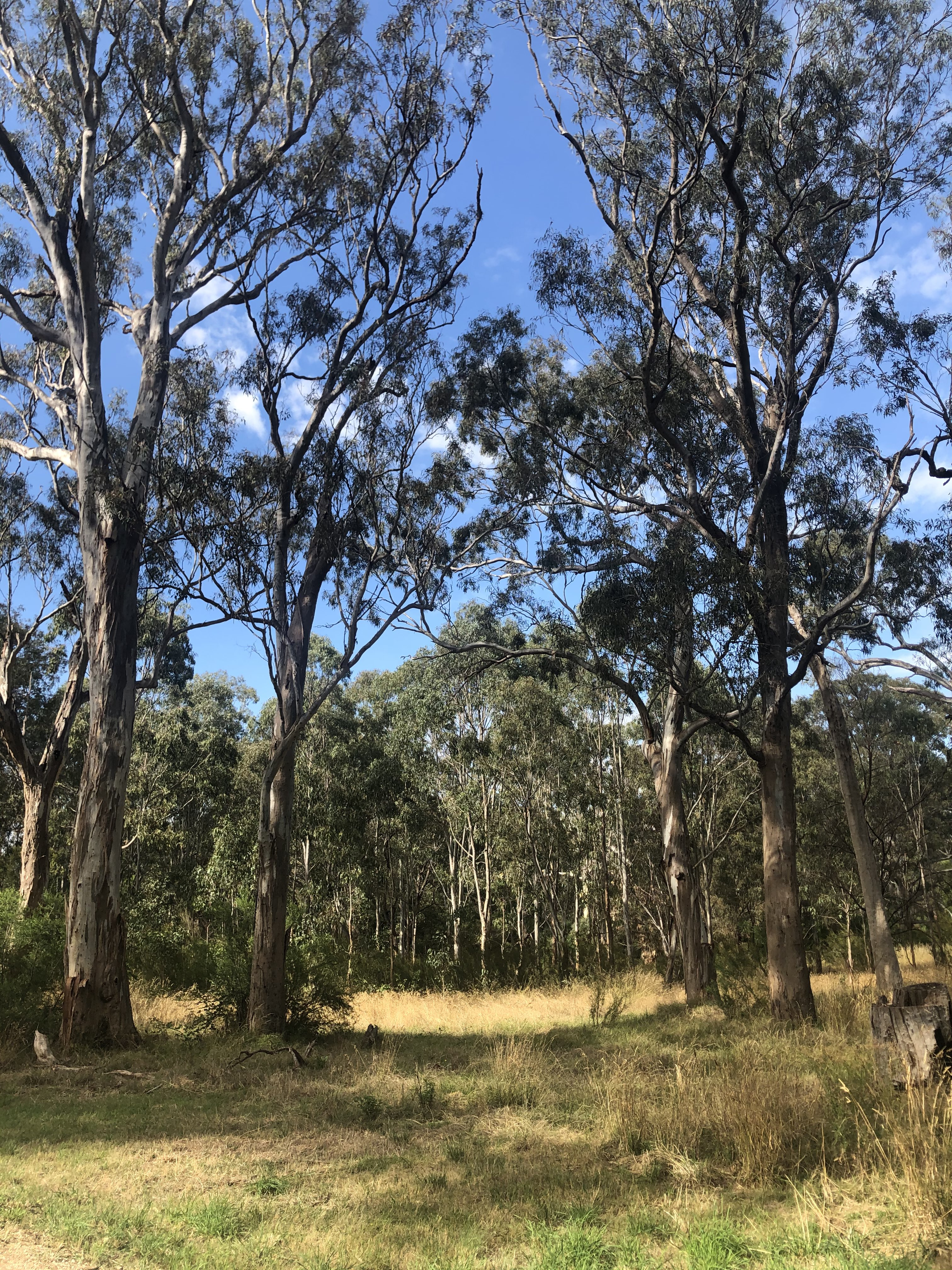
Knob Reserve

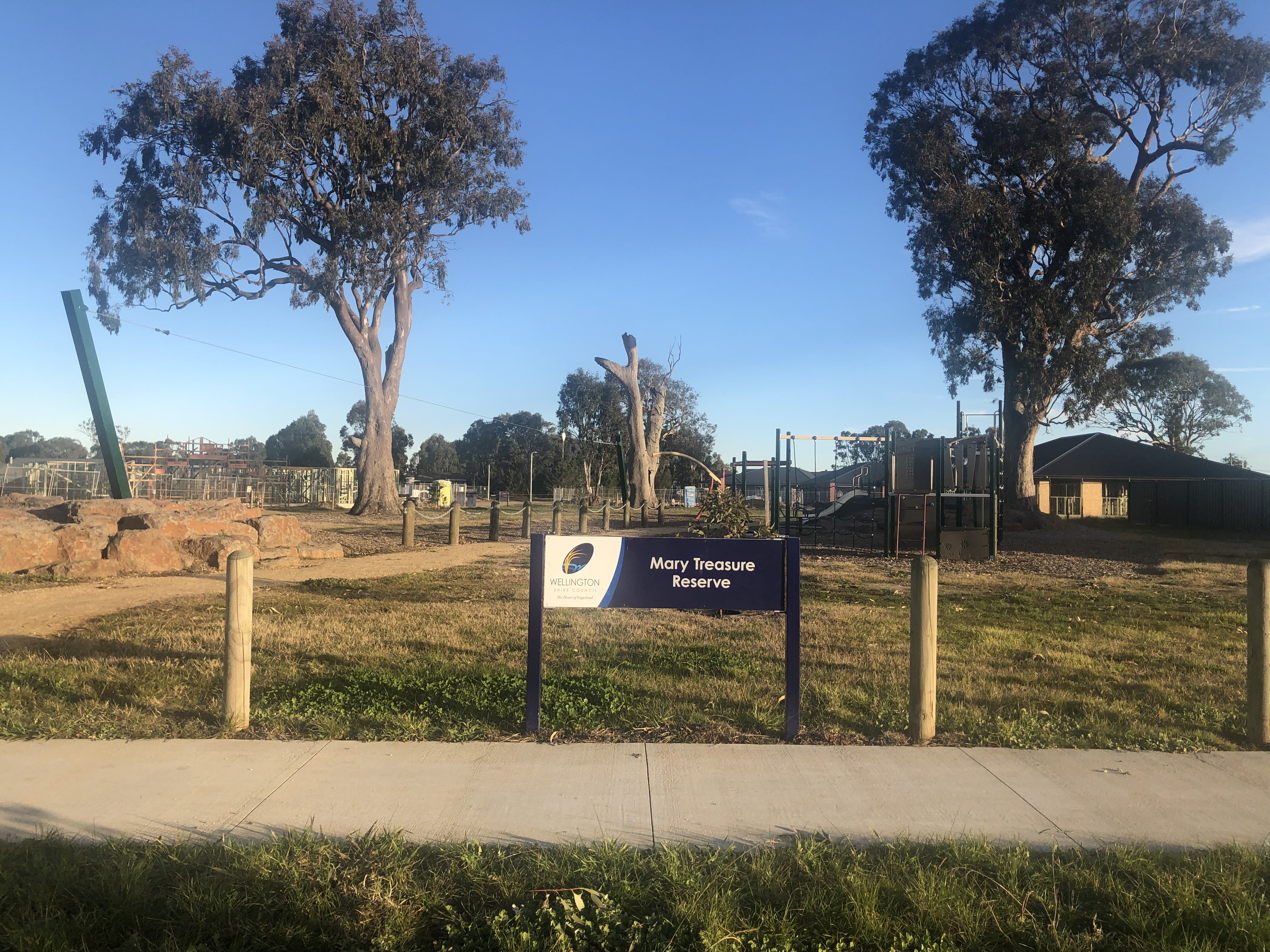
Mary Treasure Reserve

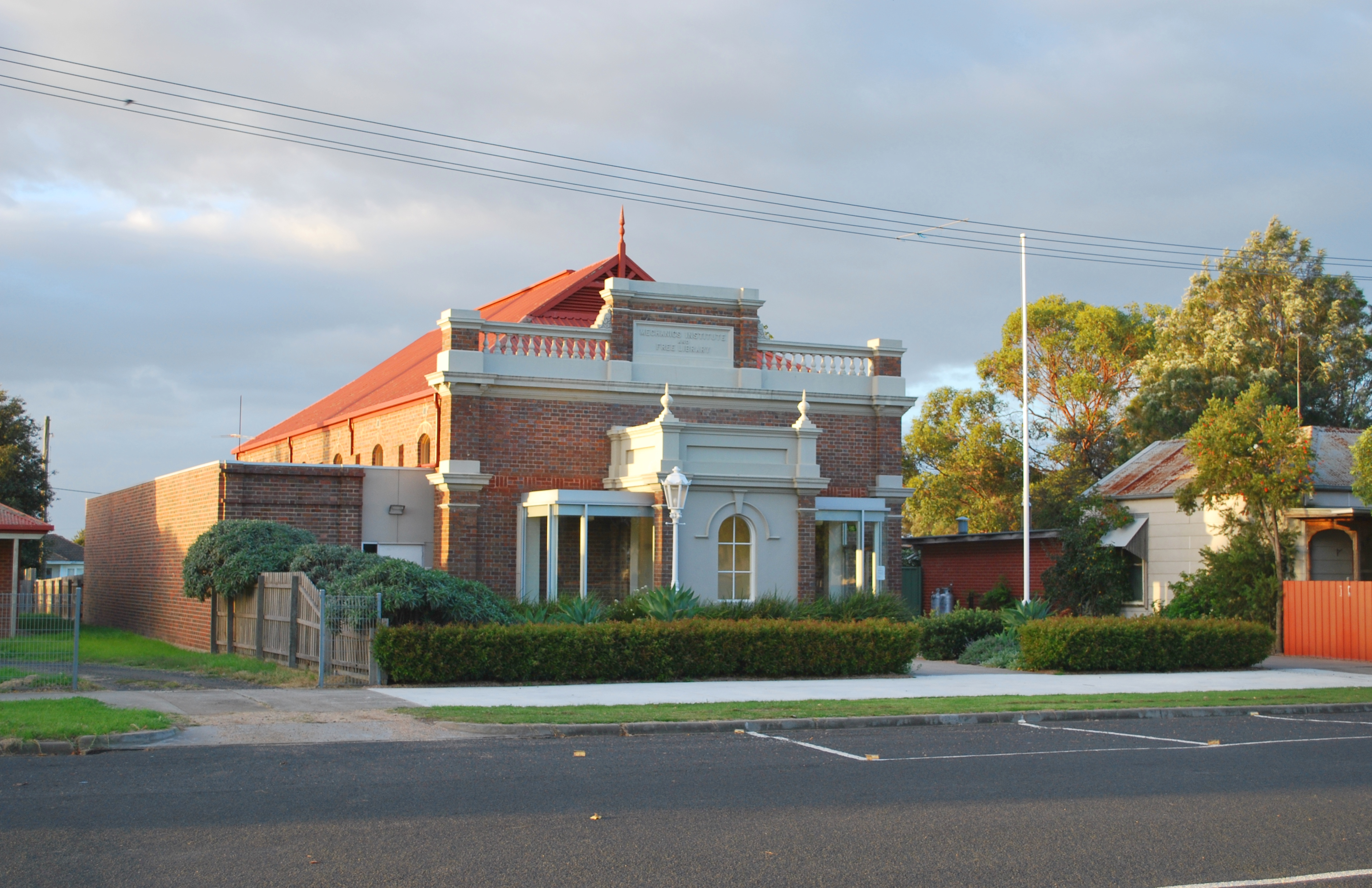
Mechanics Institute

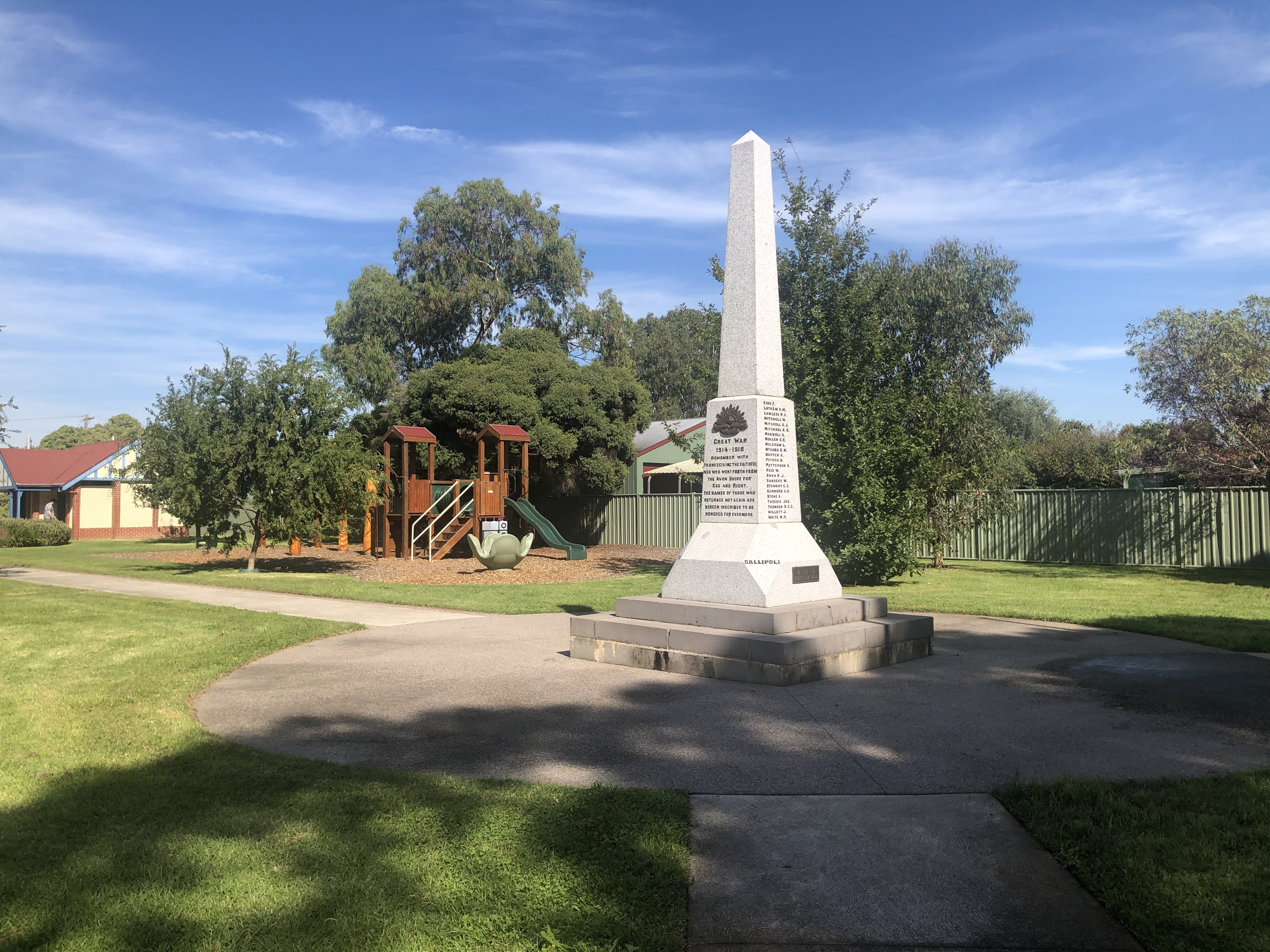
Memorial Park

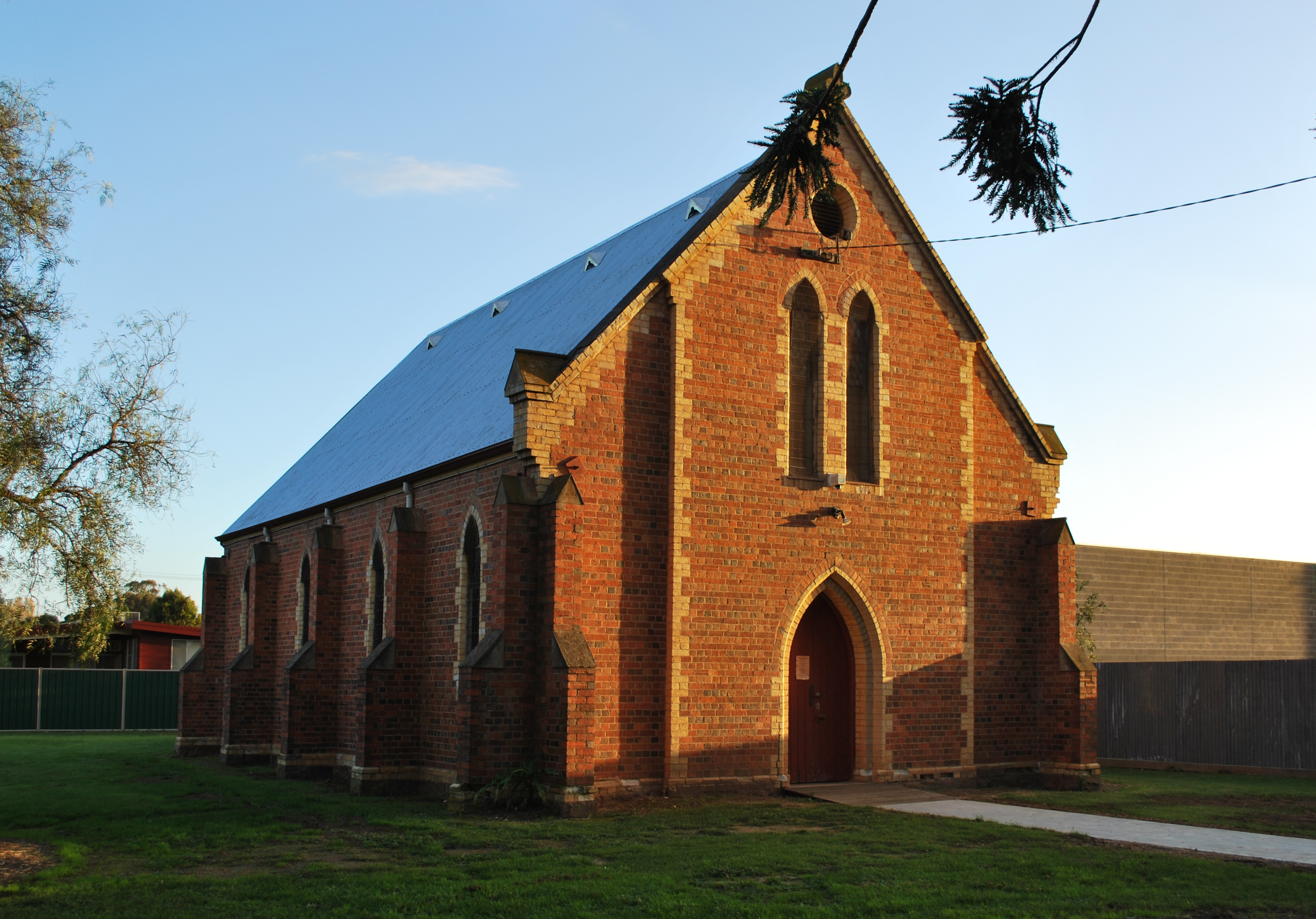
Methodist Church

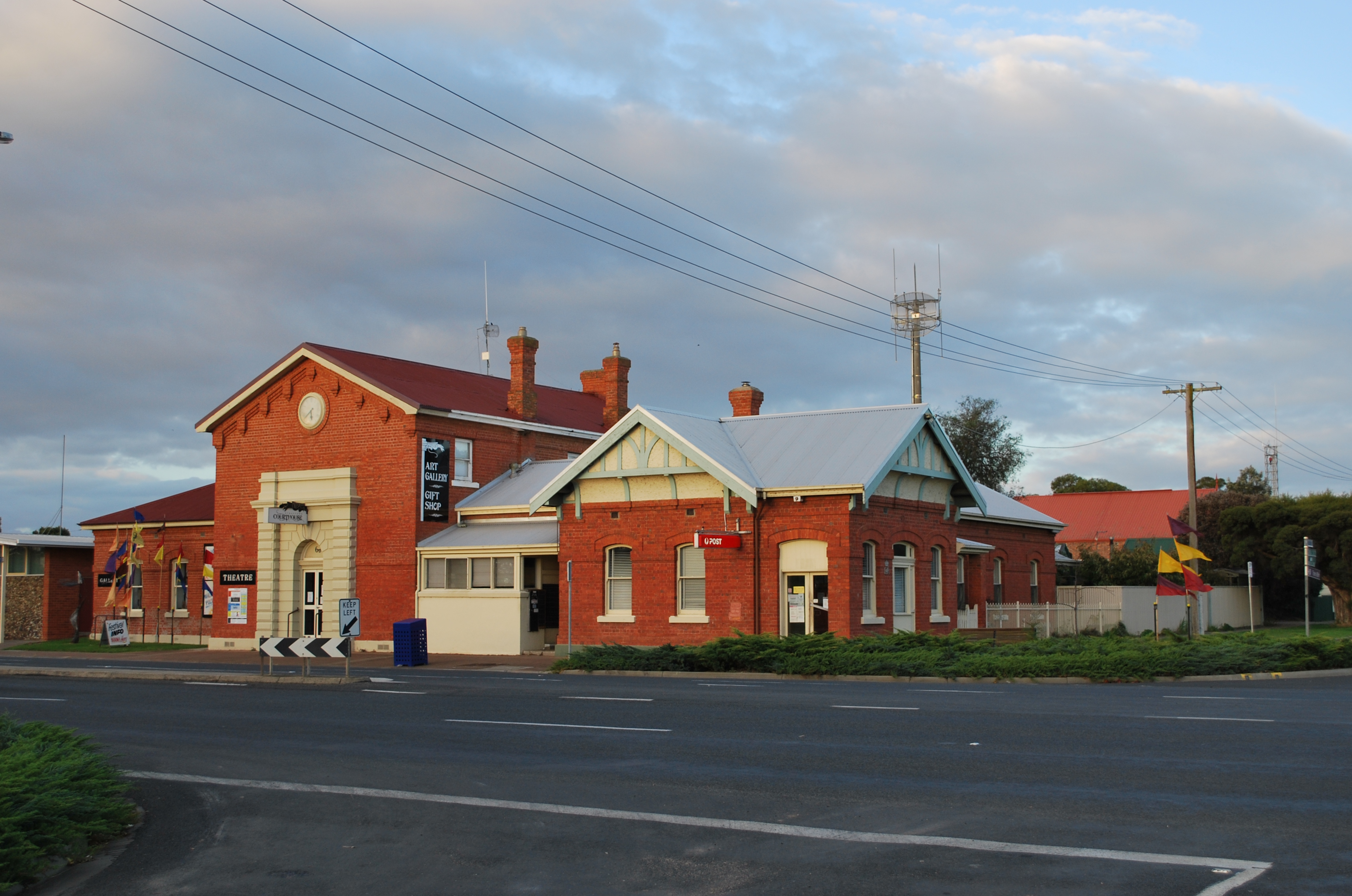
Post office

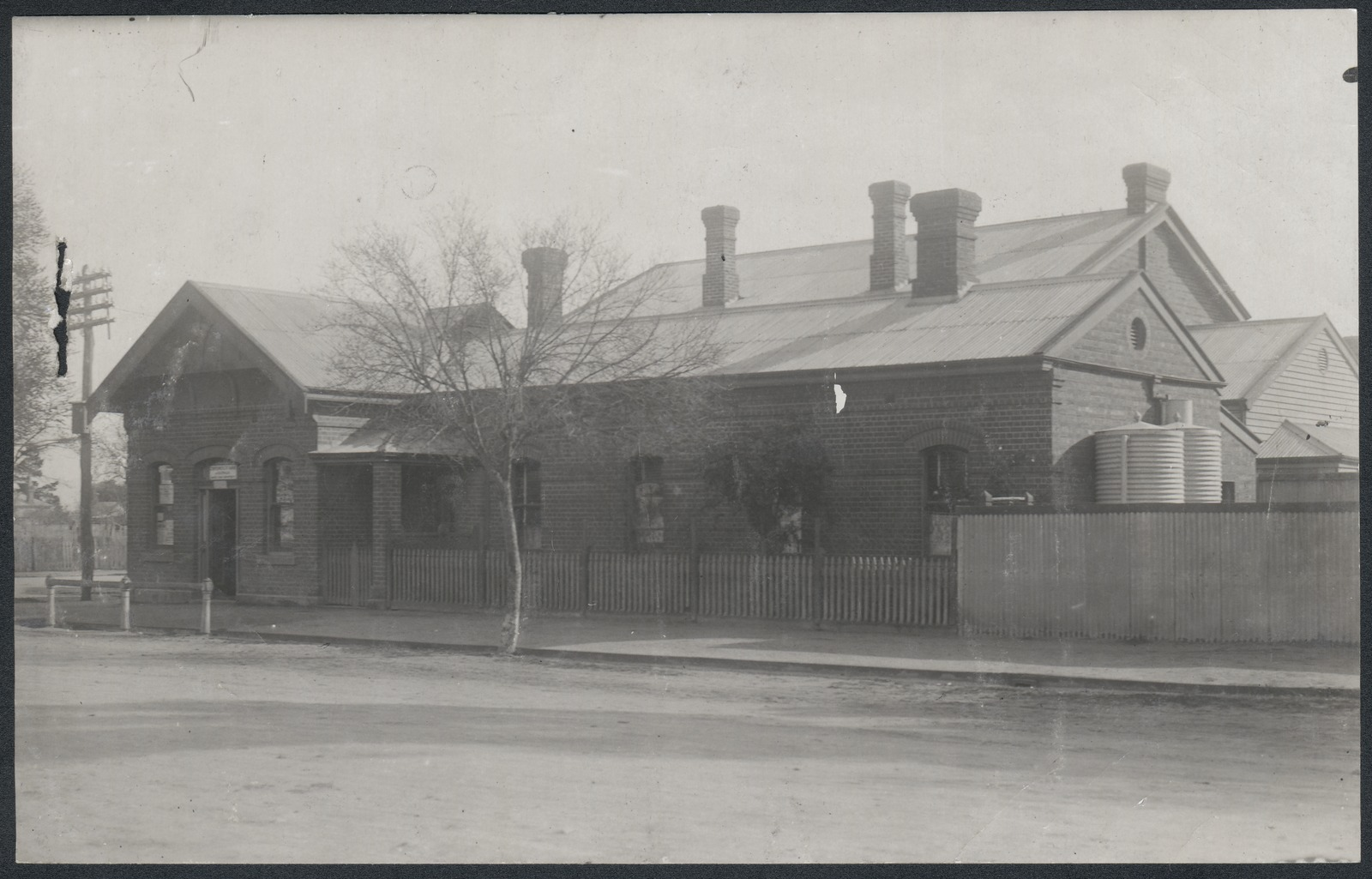
Post office in 1917

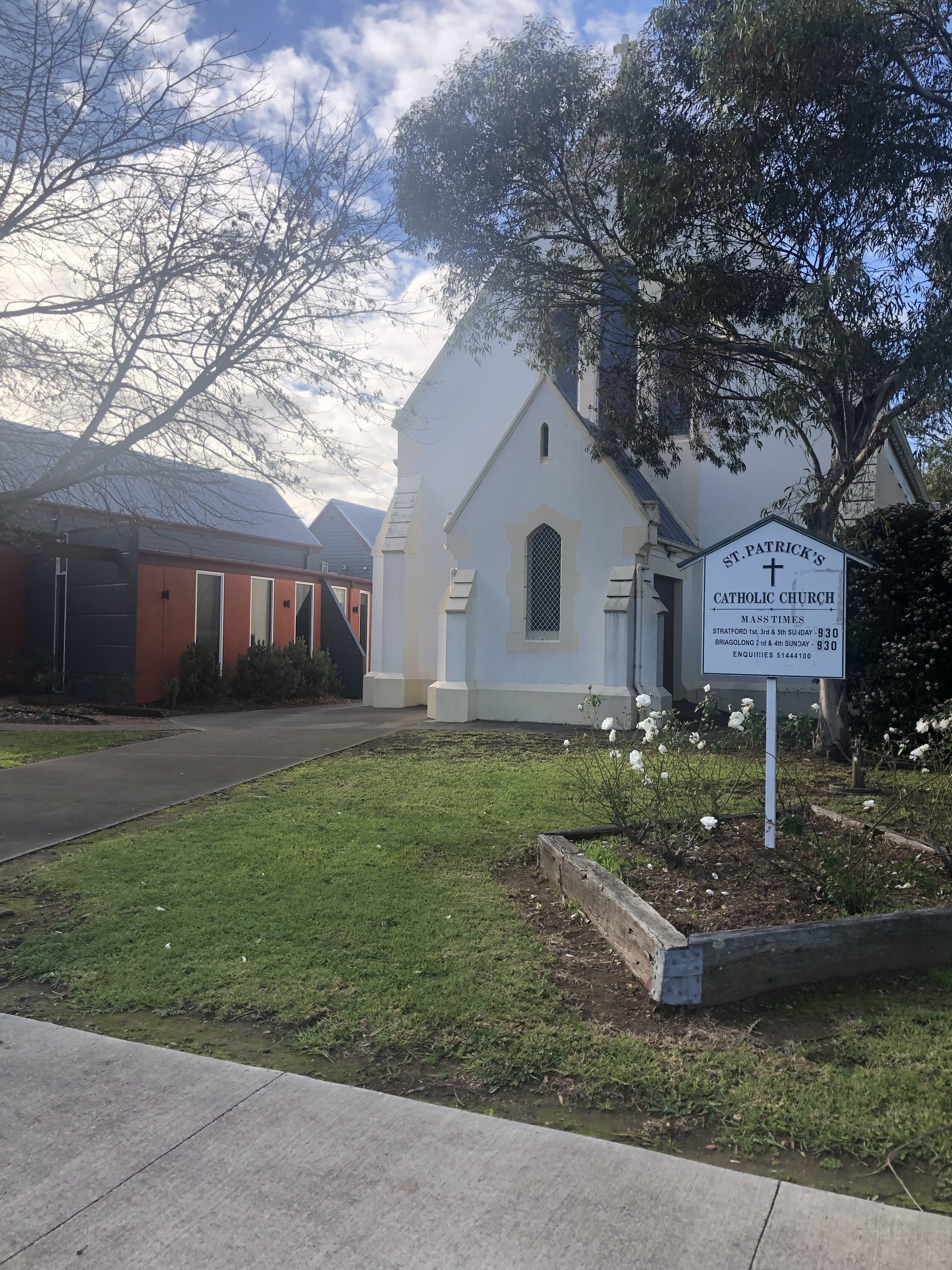
St. Patrick's Catholic Church

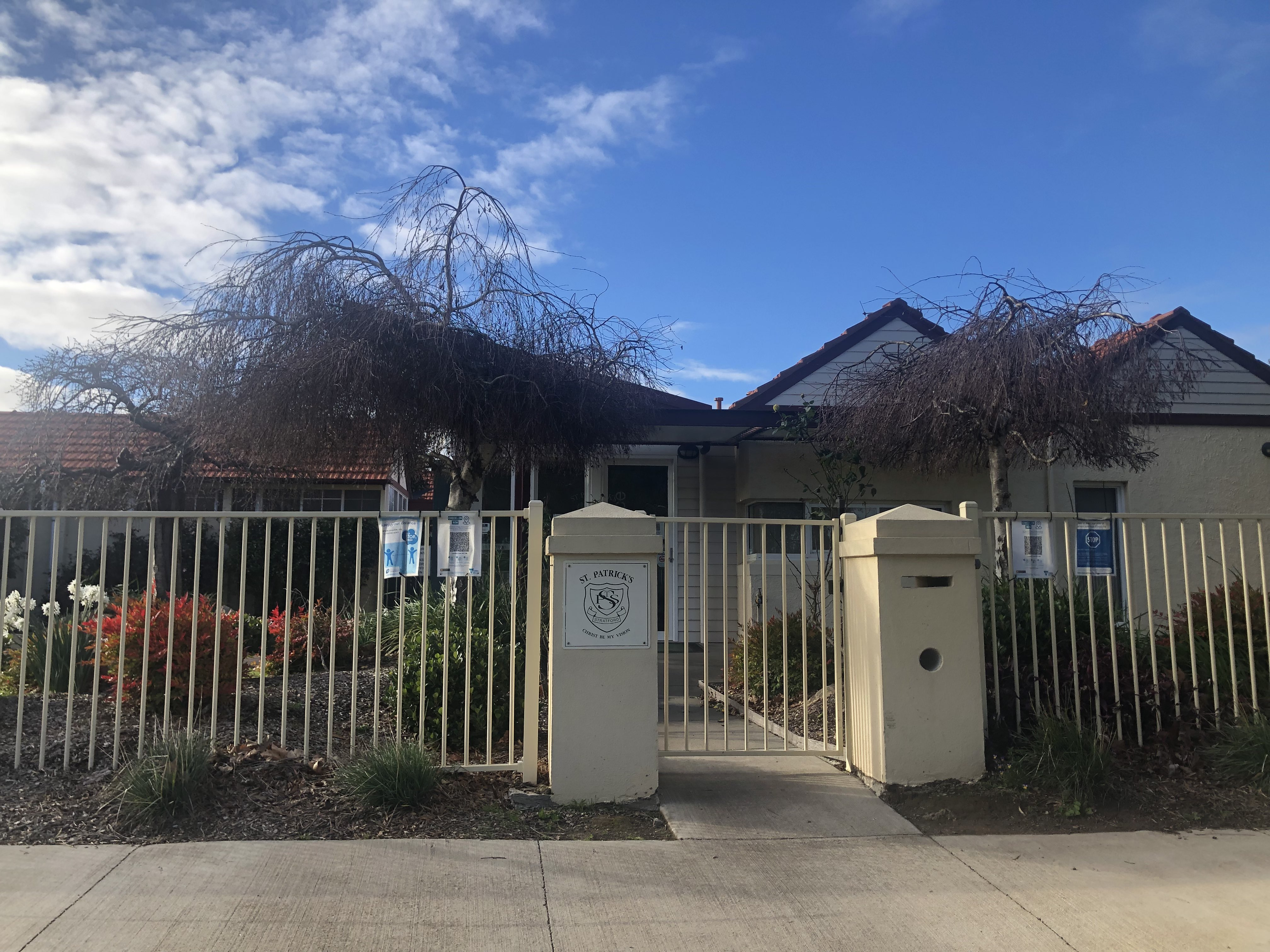
St. Patrick's Primary School

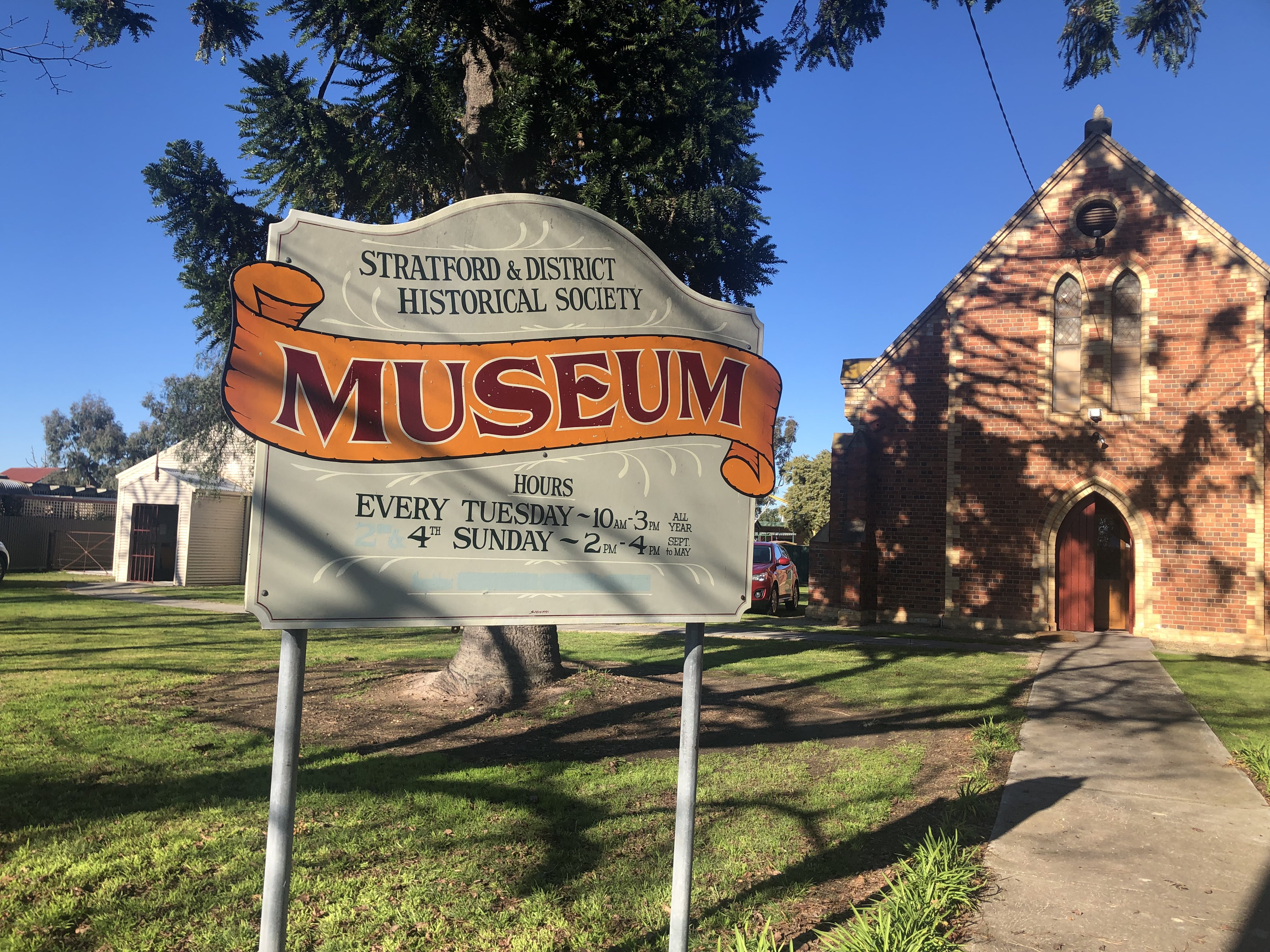
Stratford Museum

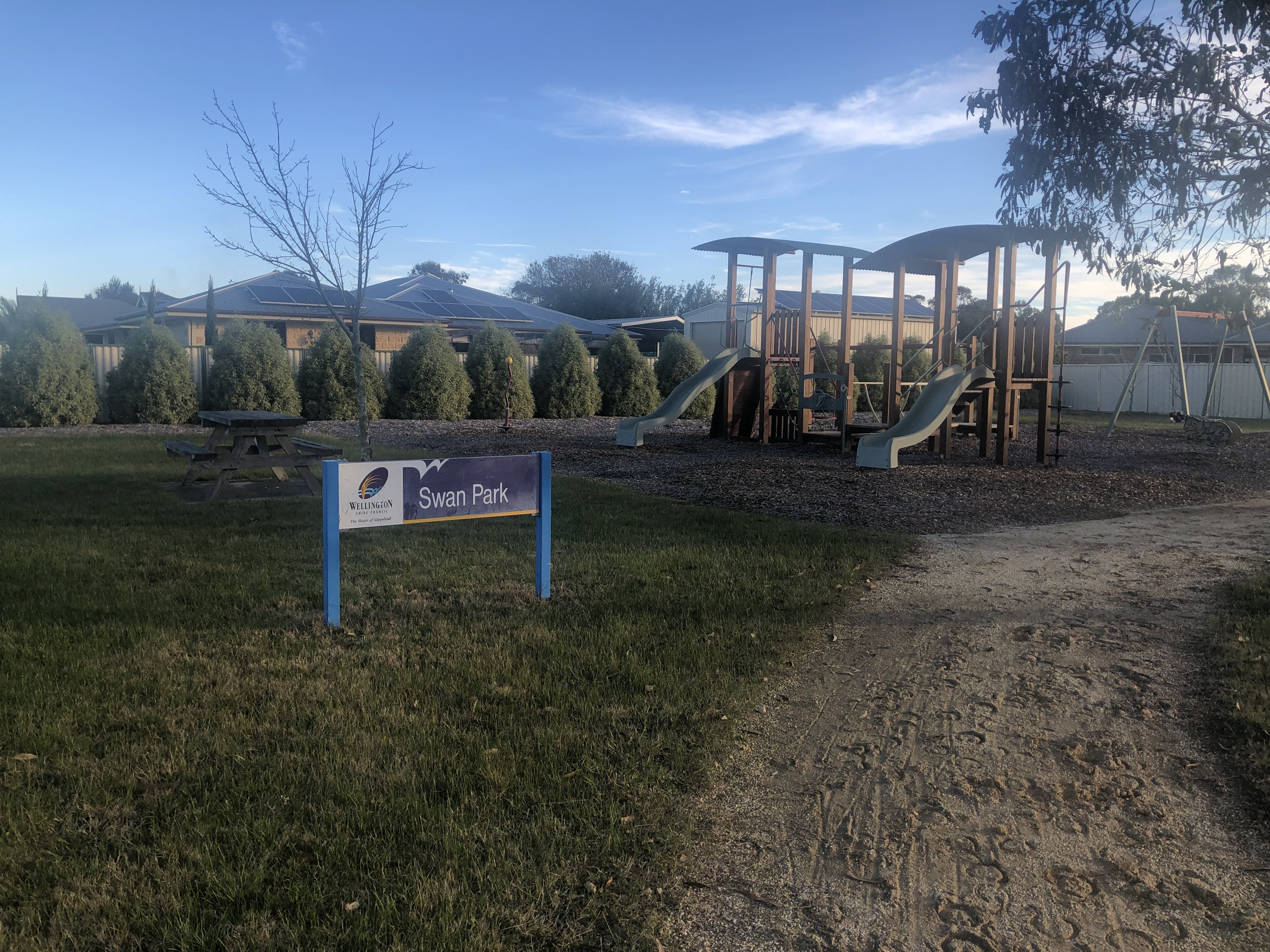
Swan Park

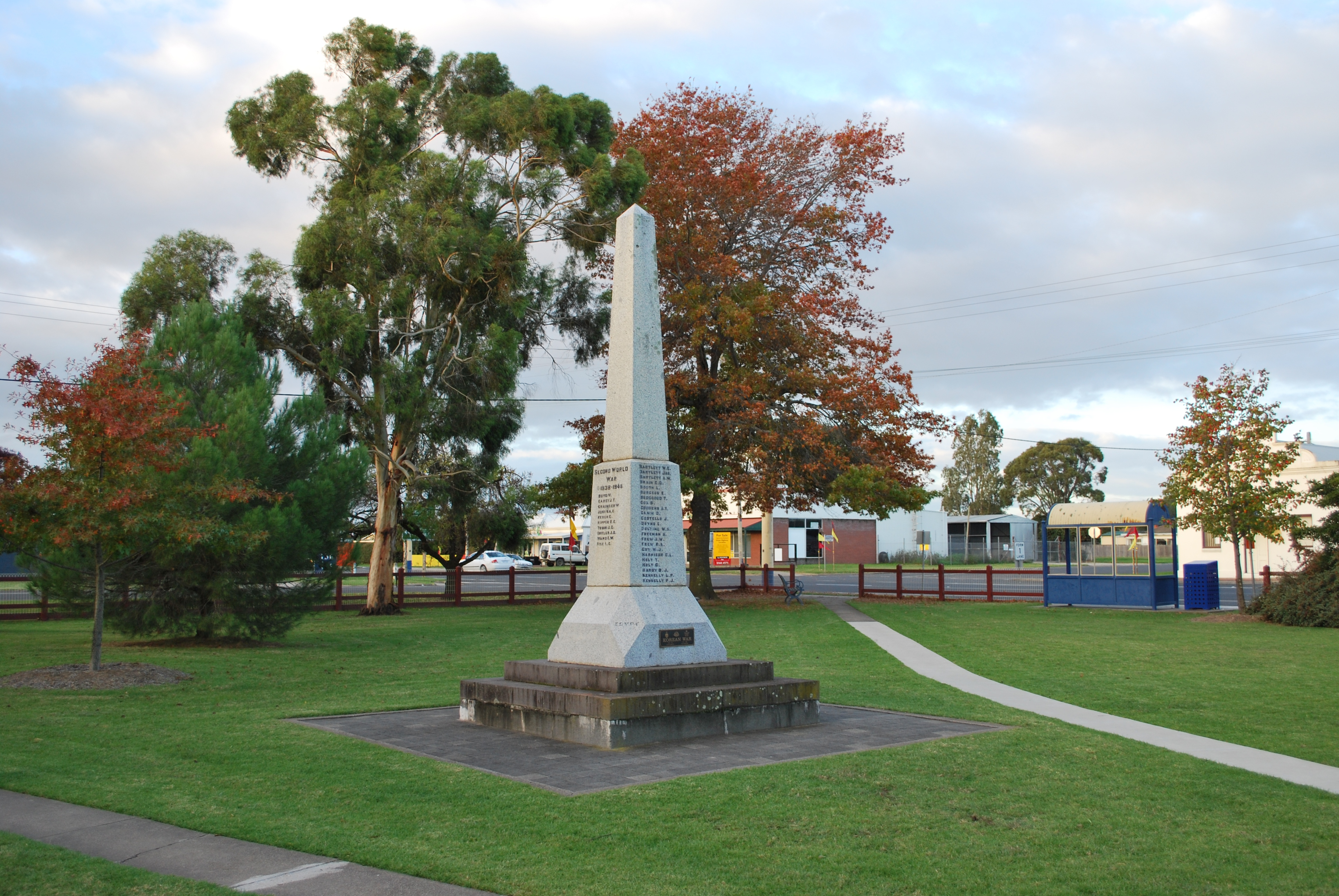
War memorial

== Sources ==
- Hay, R. (2020) Aboriginal People and Australian Football in the Nineteenth Century, SESA Publications: Melbourne. ISBN 9780994601957.
