= Nathaniel Pepper =

Engraving of Pepper from Robert Brough Smyth.

Nathaniel Pepper (c. 1841 – 7 March 1877) was a Wotjoballuk man from Victoria's Wimmera district who became a prominent Aboriginal evangelist and teacher.

Among the first students at Ebenezer mission, founded in 1859 by Moravian missionaries Friedrich Hagenauer and Friedrich Spieseke, he quickly learned to read, teach, and preach in his own language, and his 1860 baptism was widely publicised as proof of the mission's success. Nathaniel was the first Aboriginal person to be baptised in Australia. Tuberculosis afflicted him for much of his life, costing him a lung and killing his first wife, Rachel Warndekan, in 1869; he remarried in 1870 to Louise Arbuckle and moved to Ramahyuck mission in Gippsland, working as a carpenter, farmer, teacher, and preacher respected by both Aboriginal and white communities.

He died on 7 March 1877, aged 36.
