= Little Murray River (Victoria) =

River anabranch in Victoria, Australia

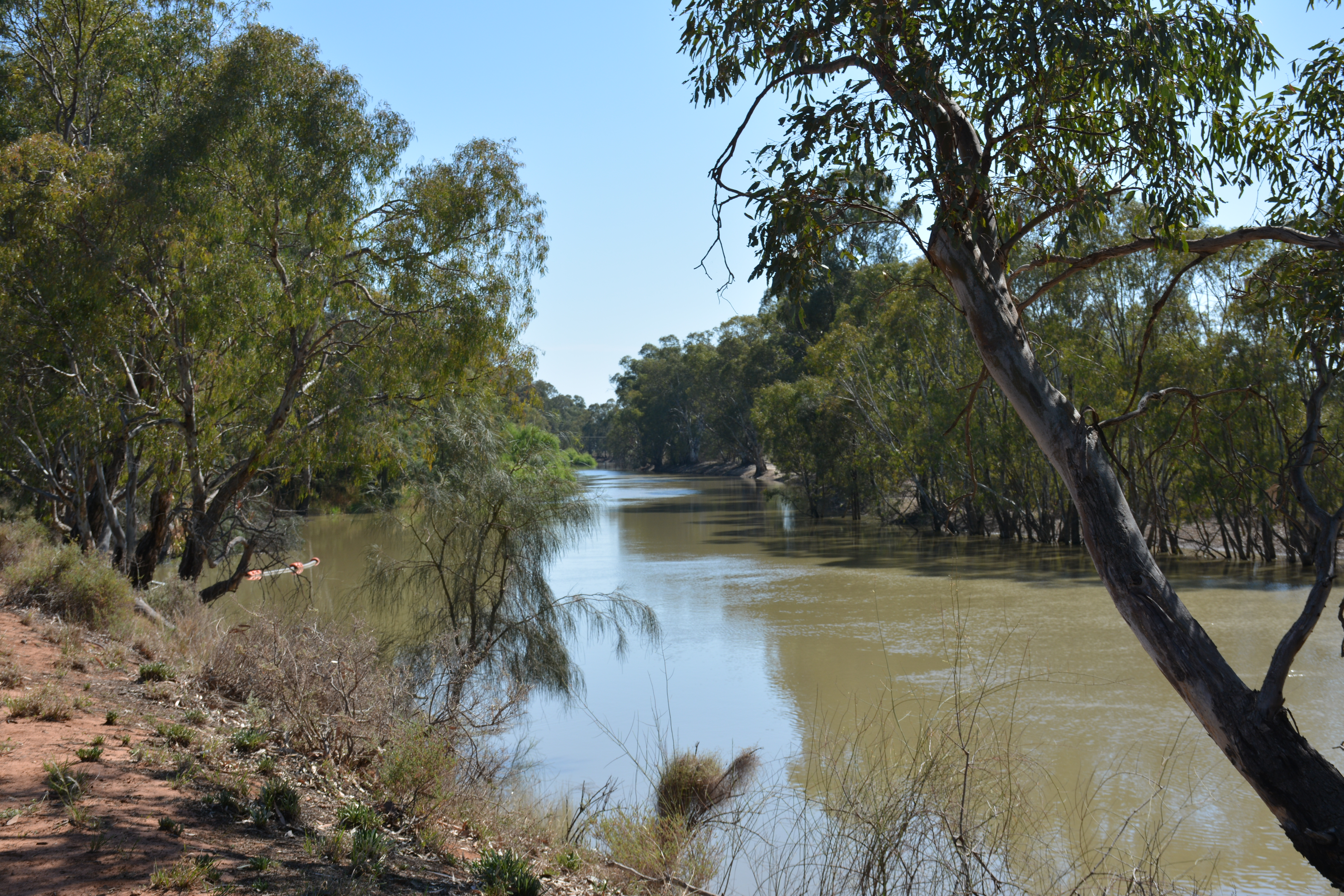
- Marraboor River, at Swan Hill

- Location of the Little Murray River mouth in Victoria
- Native name: Parnimilli (Wemba Wemba)

Location
- Country: Australia
- State: Victoria
- Region: Riverina bioregion (IBRA), Mallee
- LGA: Gannawarra, Swan Hill

Physical characteristics
- Source: Murray River
  - location: near Fish Point
  - coordinates: 35°26′48″S 143°48′55″E
  - elevation: 85 m (279 ft)
- Mouth: confluence with the Murray River
  - location: near Swan Hill
  - coordinates: 35°20′35″S 143°33′58″E
  - elevation: 67 m (220 ft)
- Length: 62 km (39 mi)

Basin features
- River system: Murray River, Murray–Darling basin
- Tributaries
  - left: Loddon River
- Island: Pental Island

The Little Murray River, an anabranch of the Murray River and part of the Murray–Darling basin, is located in the Mallee district of north western Victoria, in eastern Australia.

== Location and features ==
The anabranch leaves the Murray River near Fish Point and flows generally northwest in a highly meandering course, joined by the Loddon River, before it rejoins the Murray near Swan Hill, descending 17 metres (56 ft) over its 46 kilometres (29 mi) course. Little Murray River and the Murray River enclose Pental Island.

The traditional custodians of the land surrounding Little Murray River, the Aboriginal people of the Wemba-Wemba clan, called the river Parnimilli, meaning "little river". It is also known as the Marraboor River.

Two bridges cross the river to Pental Island, at Swan Hill in the west, and on Fish Point Road at Fish Point in the east.

== See also ==
- List of rivers of Australia § Victoria
