= Lake Boga mission =

Aboriginal station in Lake Boga, Australia

Lake Boga Mission station was established on the south-eastern shores of Lake Boga, Victoria, Australia in 1851 by the Moravian Church on the land of the Wemba-Wemba. The mission was established by two Moravian missionaries from Germany, Andreas Täger and Friedrich Spieseke. The missionaries hoped to establish gardens, keep livestock and open a school to attract and convert to Christianity and 'civilise' the local aboriginal people on their 640-acre grant of land.

Difficulties were experienced in attracting Wemba-Wemba people to the mission - no converts were ever made - and there were also issues with a dispute over a fence and the area given to the missionaries, hostility from local landholders, problems with local authorities, and with gold diggers traversing the property. The mission closed on 1 July, 1856. Täger and Spieseke left the site and Australia returning to London, without permission from headquarters, and thus in disgrace.

Spieseke and another missionary, Friedrich Hagenauer, were subsequently sent by the Moravian Church and established Ebenezer Mission at Lake Hindmarsh in 1859.
