= Tresco, Victoria =

Tresco
- Town
- Coordinates: 35°30′S 143°40′E
- Country: Australia
- State: Victoria
- LGA: Rural City of Swan Hill
- Location: 317 km (197 mi) from Melbourne; 23 km (14 mi) from Swan Hill; 155 km (96 mi) from Robinvale; 240 km (150 mi) from Mildura

Population
  - Total: 209 (2016 census)
- Postcode: 3583
Localities around Tresco
Lake Boga	Winlaton	Winlaton
Tresco West	Tresco	Mystic Park
Beauchamp	Mystic Park	Mystic Park

Tresco is a locality in Victoria, Australia, located approximately 23 km from Swan Hill. It was named after Tresco, Isles of Scilly, England. At the 2016 census, Tresco had a population of 209.

Tresco Post Office opened on 14 September 1914 at the railway station and closed in 1993. A Tresco West Post Office was open between 1923 and 1925.
