= Pental Island =

Pental Island Victoria
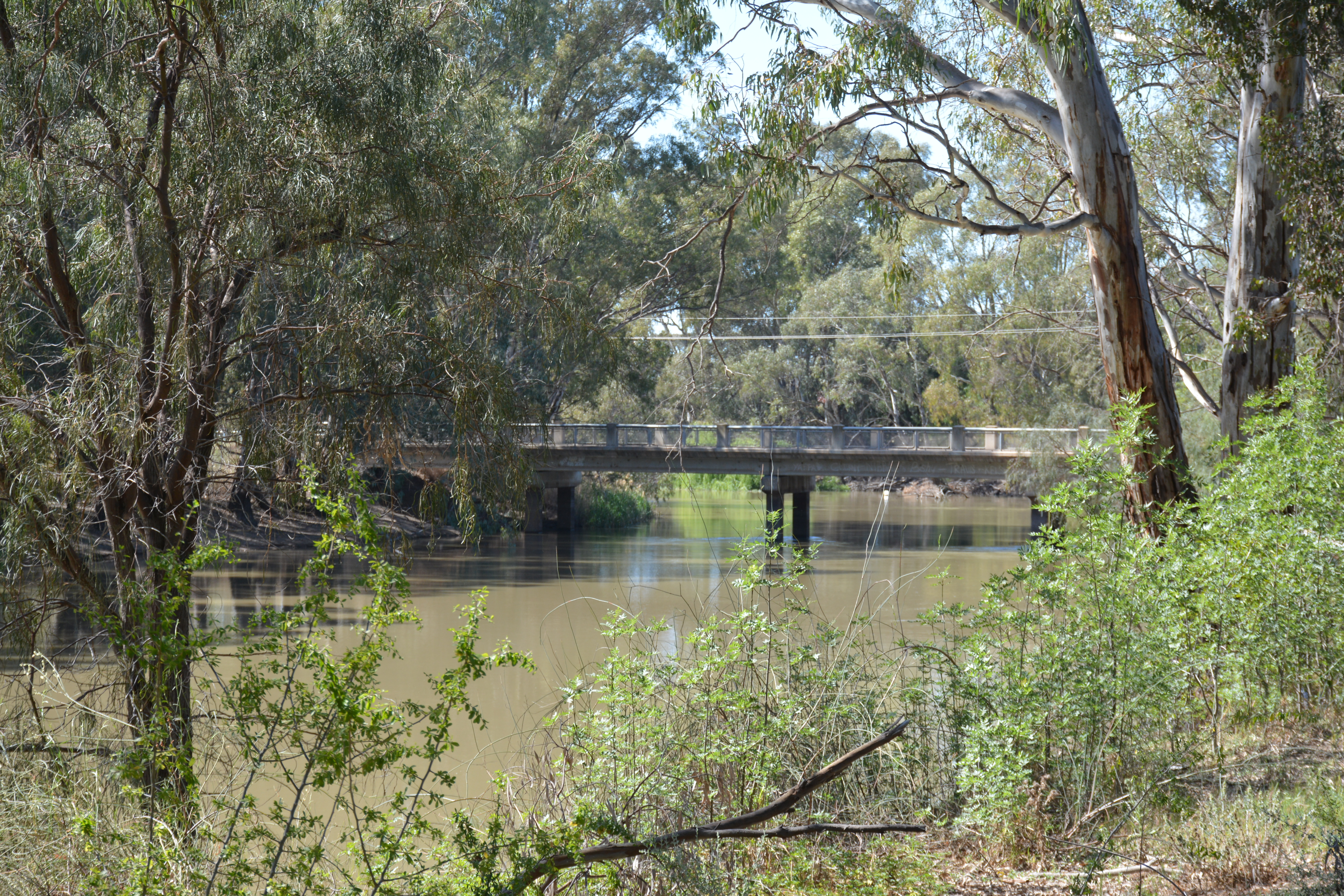
- Pental Island Bridge at Swan Hill

- Coordinates: 35°25′S 143°45′E
- Population: 135 (2016 census)
- Postcode(s): 3586
- LGA(s): Rural City of Swan Hill
Localities around Pental Island:
| Swan Hill | New South Wales | New South Wales |
| Castle Donnington | Pental Island | New South Wales |
| Lake Boga | Fish Point | Benjeroop |

Pental Island is an island and locality in Victoria, Australia, bordering Swan Hill, Victoria in the north. The island is bordered by the Murray River in the north and the Little Murray River in the south; the Little Murray diverges from the Murray at Fish Point and converges at Swan Hill. Pental Island is also a parish of the County of Tatchera and the boundaries of the three entities are identical. At the 2016 census, Pental Island had a population of 135, down from 380 ten years earlier. The indigenous Wemba Wemba name for the island is Pakaruk.

Two bridges allow access to the island from within Victoria, on Pental Island Road at Swan Hill in the west, and on Fish Point Road at Fish Point in the east. There are no crossings to the island over the Murray from New South Wales.

== Boundary dispute ==
Pental Island is one of two areas (the other is Beveridge Island) which were the subject of border disputes between the states of Victoria and New South Wales. When the Murray was opened for navigation the question arose as to whether all navigable channels were part of New South Wales, as claimed by that state, or whether the Little Murray River was a continuation of the Loddon River enclosing Pental Island as claimed by Victoria. The dispute was raised in 1871 and was resolved in favour of Victoria by the Judicial Committee, with no detailed reasons given.
