= Winlaton, Victoria =

Winlaton
- Town
- Coordinates: 35°29′11″S 143°47′16″E
- Country: Australia
- State: Victoria
- LGA: Rural City of Swan Hill

Government
  - State electorate: Murray Plains
  - Federal division: Mallee

Population
  - Total: 0 (SAL 2021)
- Postcode: 3585
Localities around Winlaton
Lake Boga	Fish Point	Benjeroop
Tresco	Winlaton	Benjeroop
Tresco	Mystic Park	Benjeroop

Winlaton is a locality located in the Rural City of Swan Hill, Victoria, Australia. The post office there opened on 17 October 1927 and was closed on 31 October 1944. In 2021 it had a population of 0.
