= Henry Hagenauer =

Australian rules footballer

Personal information
- Full name: Henry Alexander Hagenauer
- Born: 7 November 1878; Stratford, Victoria
- Died: 29 July 1949 (aged 70); Hampton, Victoria
- Original team: Ormond College

Playing career^{1}
Years	Club	Games (Goals)
1898	Melbourne	1 (0)
- ^{1} Playing statistics correct to the end of 1898.

Dr Henry Alexander Hagenauer (7 November 1878 – 29 July 1949) was an Australian rules footballer who played with Melbourne in the Victorian Football League (VFL).

The son of Louisa (née Knobloch) and Presbyterian missionary Friedrich Hagenauer, Hagenauer grew up on the Aboriginal Ramahyuck mission, which had been founded by his parents, with three brothers. In 1892, Hagenauer enrolled as a boarder at Geelong College, and then Ormond College at Melbourne University to study medicine.

While at university, Hagenauer made his senior VFL debut for Melbourne, against South Melbourne at Lake Oval on 13 August 1898. Hagenauer then transferred to Sale Football Club in the Gippsland Football Association.

Hagenauer set up a medical practice in Traralgon and married Margaret Hay, a local nurse, who died in 1914. Their son Frederick would die in World War II while serving as a 2nd Lt with 1st Battalion, Scottish Royal Highlanders on 13 October 1940.

On 24 September 1915 Hagenauer enlisted (as the anglicised "Henry Alexander Hagen") in the Australian Army Medical Corps, attaining the rank of Major. Posted to 2nd Anzac Headquarters in France as a Regimental Medical Officer, Hagenauer was invalided to England in January 1917. He was then attached to No 1 Convalescent Depot till September 1918, before being transferred to No 1 Australian Dermatological Hospital. He had been promoted to Major on 28 January 1918, and was demobilised on 7 January 1919.

He remarried on 7 April 1921 at the College Church, Parkville to Sara Howat, younger daughter of the late George Howat, of Royal Park.

After the war Hagenauer practised in Traralgon until 1929, when he moved to Melbourne. While in Traralgon, Hagenauer served as President of the Coursing Club, the Gun Club and the Fish and Game Society.

Hagenauer died in Melbourne on 29 July 1949, aged 70.

== Sources ==
- Hay, R. (2020) Aboriginal People and Australian Football in the Nineteenth Century, SESA Publications: Melbourne. ISBN 9780994601957.
- Holmesby, R. & Main, J. (2014). The Encyclopedia of AFL Footballers: every AFL/VFL player since 1897 (10th ed.), BAS Publishing: Seaford, Victoria. ISBN 978-1-921496-32-5.
