= Lake Boga =

- Town
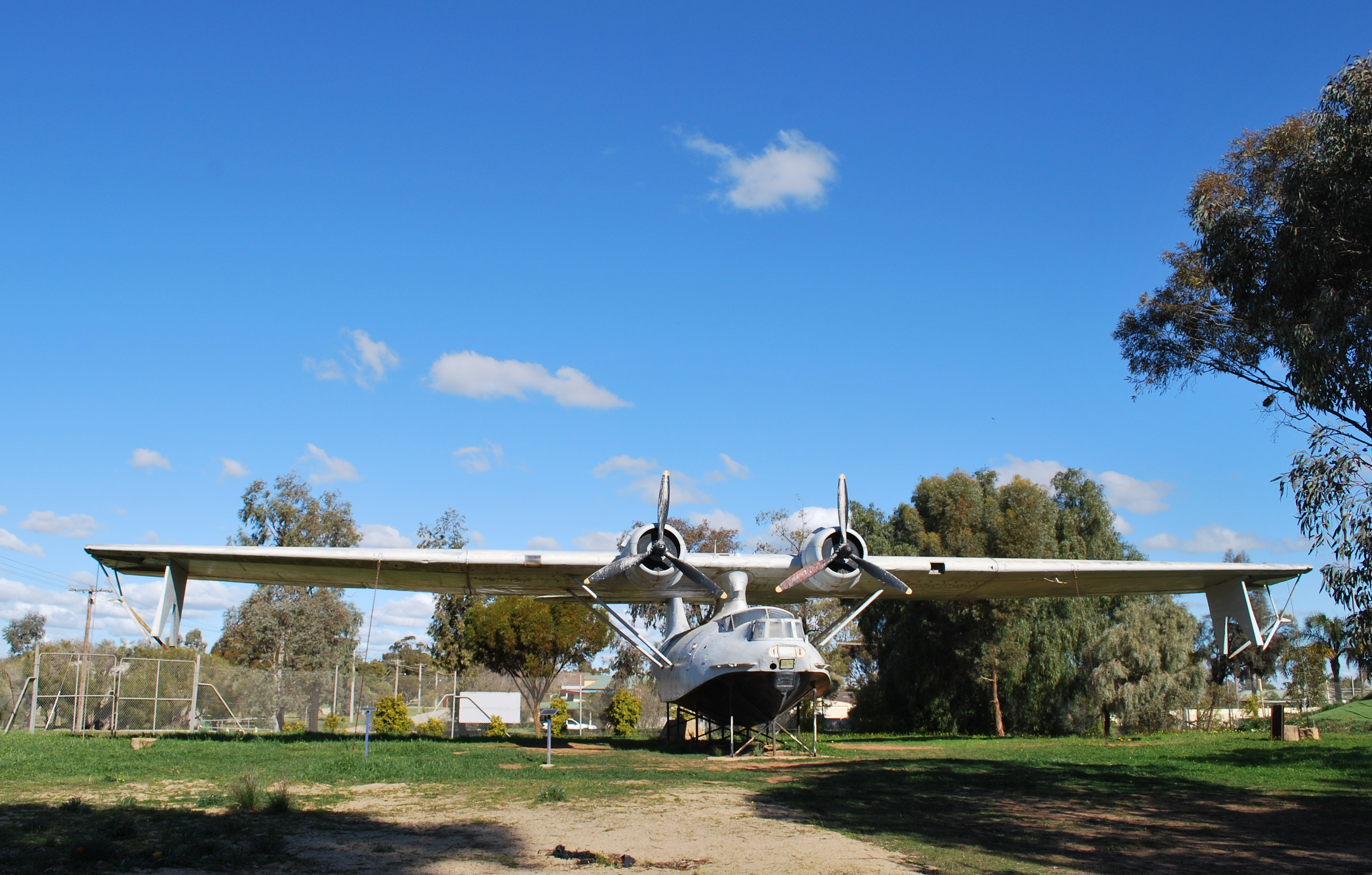
- PBY Catalina flying boat at Lake Boga

- Coordinates: 35°28′0″S 143°39′0″E
- Country: Australia
- State: Victoria
- LGA: Rural City of Swan Hill
- Location: 325 km (202 mi) from Melbourne; 17 km (11 mi) from Swan Hill

Government
  - State electorate: Murray Plains
  - Federal division: Mallee

Population
  - Total: 985 (2016 census)
- Postcode: 3584
Localities around Lake Boga
Pental Island	Pental Island	Pental Island
Castle Donnington	Lake Boga	Fish Point
Kunat	Tresco West	Winlaton, Tresco

Lake Boga ( /ˈleɪk ˈboʊɡə/) is a town in Victoria, Australia, located next to the lake of the same name. It is situated within the Rural City of Swan Hill within the Mallee region of north-west Victoria. At the 2016 census, Lake Boga had a population of 985. The town is located 325 kilometres (202 mi) north west of Melbourne and 17 kilometres (11 mi) south east of the regional centre Swan Hill.

== History ==
The Wemba-Wemba Indigenous Australian people occupied the lake for thousands of years before the arrival of Major Sir Thomas Mitchell in June 1836.

Two German Moravian missionaries, Reverend A.F.C. Täger and Reverend F.W. Spieseke, established Lake Boga mission in 1851. The mission closed in 1856 due to lack of converts, disputes with local authorities and hostilities from local landholders. The Moravian Church established a subsequent mission site near Lake Hindmarsh in 1859 (see Ebenezer Mission).

The Post Office opened on 8 August 1887.

During WW2, a secret air force base was located near the town. The southern location was selected because it was considered to be beyond the range of Japanese aircraft advancing on Australia from the north.

== The town today ==
The town is located next to the lake of the same name, which is popular with water sports, particularly water skiing. The surrounding area is used for agriculture including fruit and vegetable growing and grain production. There is a sizable wine grape industry in the area and one local winery.

There is a PBY Catalina flying boat on display as Lake Boga was a Royal Australian Air Force flying boat maintenance facility during World War II, known as the Lake Boga Flying Boat Base.

The town has an Australian rules football team competing in the Central Murray Football League.

Regional water shortage caused by drought resulted in Lake Boga becoming completely dry. In March 2010, work began to refill the lake and by June the lake was full to the brim The lake has an approximate capacity of 37,794 megalitres (8.314×10^{9} imp gal; 9.984×10^{9} US gal).
