= Fish Point, Victoria =

Fish Point Victoria
- Coordinates: 35°26′S 143°43′E
- Population: 15 (2016 census)
- Postcode(s): 3488
- Location: 318 km (198 mi) from Melbourne; 25 km (16 mi) from Swan Hill; 39 km (24 mi) from Kerang; 243 km (151 mi) from Mildura
- LGA(s): Rural City of Swan Hill
- Federal division(s): Mallee
Localities around Fish Point:
| Lake Boga | Lake Boga | Pental Island |
| Lake Boga | Fish Point | Pental Island |
| Winlaton | Winlaton | Winlaton |

Fish Point is a locality in Victoria, Australia approximately 25 kilometres (16 mi) from Swan Hill, Victoria.

Fish Point Post Office opened on 7 November 1890 and closed in 1962.
