= Ebenezer Mission =

Aboriginal mission near Lake Hindmarsh in Victoria, Australia (1859-1904)

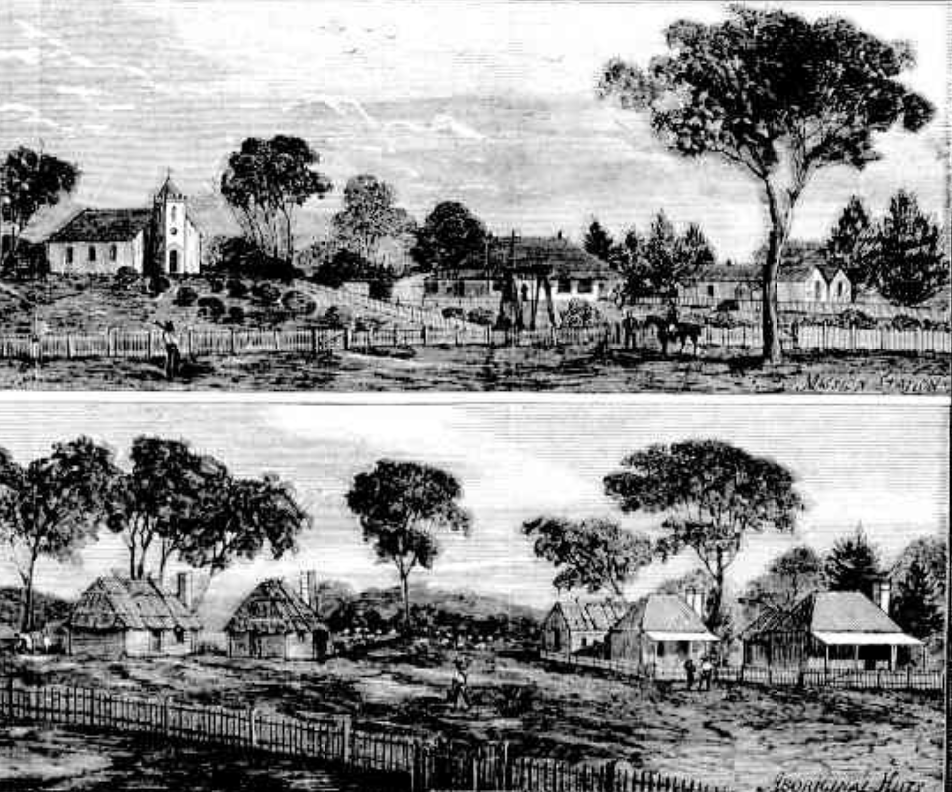
Ebenezer Mission, in 1882

Ebenezer Mission, also known as Wimmera mission, Hindmarsh mission and Dimboola mission, was a mission station for Aboriginal people established near Lake Hindmarsh in Victoria, Australia (near Jeparit) in 1859 by the Moravian Church on the land of the Wotjobaluk. The first missionaries were two Germans, Reverend Friedrich Hagenauer and Reverend F.W. Spieseke (c. 1821–1877). In 1861 the Victorian Colonial Government gazetted 1,897 acres (7.68 km^{2}) as a reserve for the Ebenezer Mission Station. The mission was established a few years after the failure of the Moravian Lake Boga mission in Wemba-Wemba territory.

Horatio Cockburn Ellerman, an early settler who established Antwerp Station, suggested the site where the mission station was established rather than the three sites suggested by the Government. The site selected was known as "Banji bunag", and had traditional meaning for the Wotjobaluk, being a corroboree ground according to elder Uncle Jack Kennedy, and also contained the grave for an Aboriginal woman shot dead, the mother of William Wimmera.

The main aim of the mission was to "civilise" and Christianise the Aboriginal inhabitants of the area. In 1860, the first convert to Christianity, Nathanael Pepper, was baptised. Rations were given to residents on the condition that they attended church services and school.

As a result of the Half-Caste Act 1886 which forced "half-caste" Aboriginal people off missions, by 1892 the number of residents at Ebenezer Mission Station had dropped to only 30 people.

In 1902 the State Government of Victoria decided to close the Ebenezer Mission due to low numbers. The mission closed in 1904, and most of the land was handed back to the Victorian Lands Department and made available for selection in 1905.

In the following twenty years, many Wergaia people were forcibly moved to Lake Tyers Mission in Gippsland under police escort, along with closure of all rations to Ebenezer Mission and seizure of children. Despite these measures, some Wergaia families avoided relocation and remained on their ancestral lands.

== See also ==
- Lake Condah Mission
- Royal Commission on the Aborigines (1877)
