= Lake Boga Flying Boat Base =

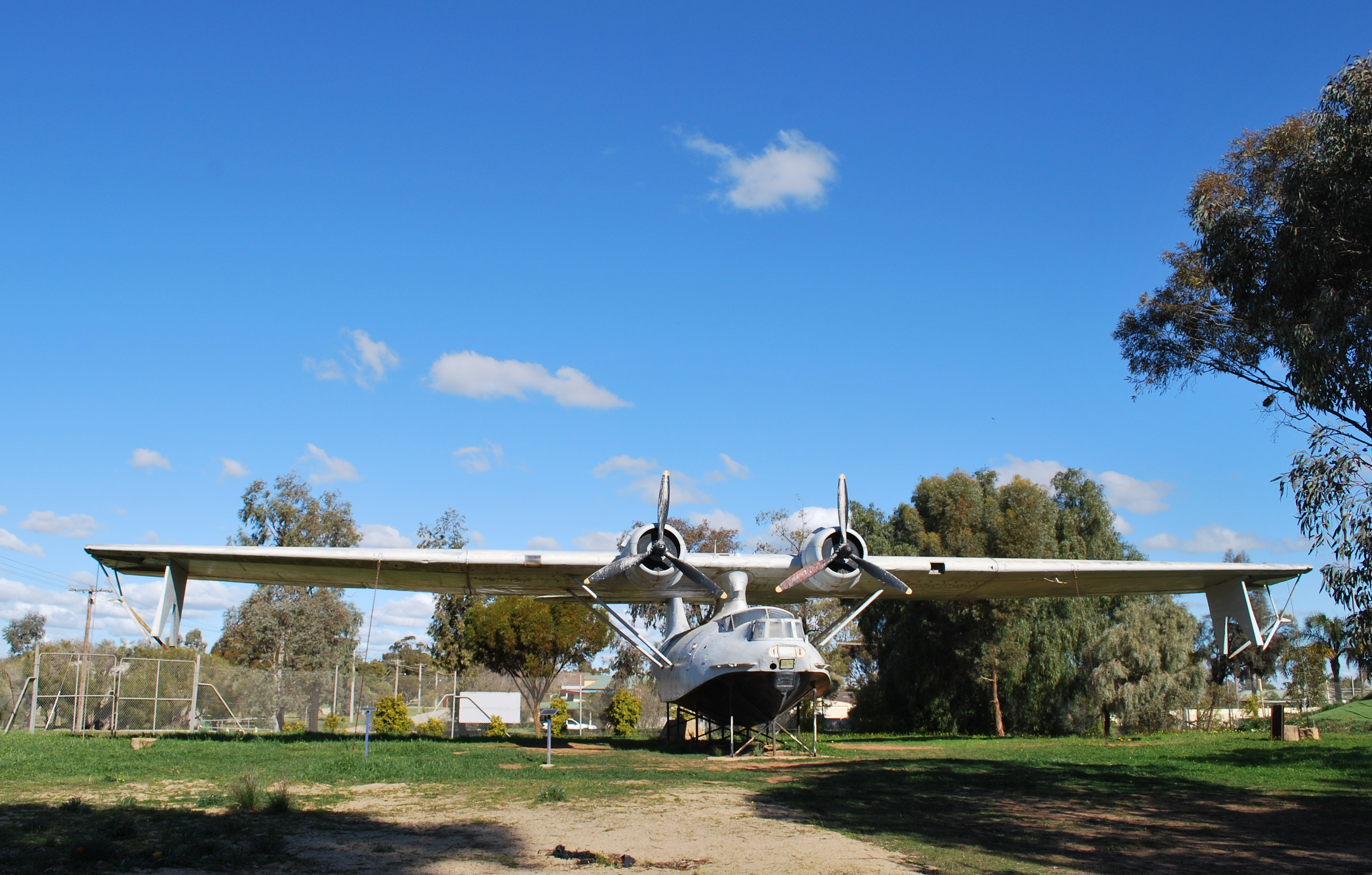
- A Consolidated PBY Catalina flying boat at the Lake Boga flying boat museum
- IATA: none; ICAO: none

Summary
- Location: Lake Boga, Victoria, Australia
- Built: June 1942
- In use: 1942–1947
- Coordinates: 35°27′3.96″S 143°37′39.69″E
- Interactive map of Lake Boga Flying Boat Base

Lake Boga Flying Boat Base was a Royal Australian Air Force (RAAF) flying boat base at Lake Boga, Victoria, Australia during World War II.

== History ==
When the Imperial Japanese attacked Darwin and Broome in 1942 resulting in the loss of 16 flying boats, the establishment of a safe landing point for flying boats was required inland as a remote facility outside the sphere of Japanese airplanes. Lake Boga was picked as it allowed almost unlimited choice of landing/take off directions and was free of obstructions. It was also close to nearby infrastructure.

Required for Australian, Royal Netherlands East Indies Air Force and United States flying boat servicing and repairs, Lake Boga was commissioned in June 1942. No. 1 Flying Boat Repair and Service Depot was set up to provide the repair and servicing requirements. Lake Boga was recommended by Squadron Leader Gareth O'Brien since he was familiar with the area having grown up in Kerang. Of note, Myles O'Brien (Father to Gareth) was the local solicitor and owned the first automobile in Kerang. SQN leader Gareth O'Brien saw service with the Royal Naval Air Service in Yorkshire UK in the late 1920s and Cairo, Egypt in the early 1930s. Being an avid photographer of that time he took many black and white photographs that still exist and have been published in some historical publications. Flight Lieutenant (at the time) Gareth O'Brien was awarded the Distinguished Service Order for dropping two bombs from his aircraft on a submarine in the English Channel, 6 March 1918. A direct hit was reported by the observer and it was thought to have sunk but SQN Leader O'Brien, in a letter to his father, thought he perhaps only gave it a 'shake up'.

Facilities constructed at the base included workshops and hangars on the foreshore, a stores area, living quarters, sick quarters at Castle Donnington, a first-aid and dental post, a radio transmitting station and a VHF transmitting station.

Flying boats serviced, repaired, restored, rebuilt or overhauled during the operation of the base were PBY Catalina, Dornier Do 24, OS2U Kingfisher, Short Sunderland, Supermarine Walrus and Martin Mariner.

The station at Lake Boga closed in November 1947.

The underground communications bunker has been restored to what it would have looked like during the base's time of operation. Catalina (A24-30) has been reconstructed as a memorial to the personnel who served at No 1 Flying Boat Repair Depot during World War II. The site is listed on the Victorian Heritage Register.

A new museum was constructed over the restored Catalina in 2012, it contains more than 500 artifacts along with a guided introduction to the former base and the aircraft.

== See also ==
- Crawley, Western Australia
- RAAF Base Rathmines
