= Friedrich Hagenauer =

German missionary (1829–1909)

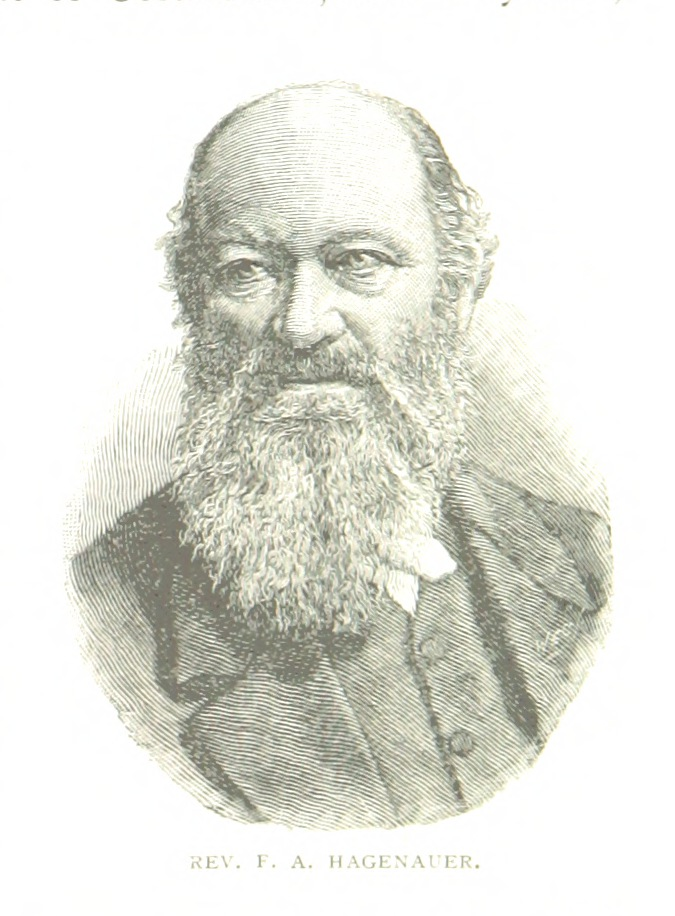
An 1888 illustration of Hagenauer

Friedrich August Hagenauer (10 March 1829 – 28 November 1909) was a German Moravian minister and missionary in Australia who established Ebenezer Mission and Ramahyuck mission. In 1859, Hagenauer was sent to Australia and established Ebenezer Mission station near Lake Hindmarsh, Victoria, Australia in Wergaia territory.

== Early life ==
Hagenauer was born on 10 March 1829 in Hohenleuben, Saxony (now Germany). He was raised in the Lutheran Church. When he was fourteen years old, Hagenauer left scool and worked in railway construction with his father.

In 1851, Hagenauer was accepted by the Brotherhood of Moravian priests as a misisonary trainee at Herrnhut, Ebersdorf.

== Career ==
In 1857, Reverend Hagenauer was sent to Victoria, Australia with Rev. F. W. Spieseke. They established Ebenezer Mission station near Lake Hindmarsh, Victoria, Australia in Wergaia territory.

In 1863 Hagenauer established Ramahyuck Mission on the banks of the Avon River near Lake Wellington to house the members of the Gunai people who survived massacres and attacks in west and central Gippsland. The name combines "Ramah", the home of Samuel in the First Book of Kings, with "yuck", an Aboriginal term reputedly meaning "our place". The mission sought to discourage all tribal ritual and culture, and replace it with Christian values and European customs. The Mission closed in 1908 and the few remaining residents were moved to Lake Tyers Mission.

He played a significant role in lobbying the Board for the Protection of Aborigines (BPA) to introduce the nicknamed 'Half-Caste Act' which forced Aboriginal people under 34 years of age with non-Aboriginal parentage to leave missions. This created much distress for Aboriginal people as outlined in letters written to the BPA which document requests for permission to visit family left on missions and for provision of basic needs from people struggling to survive in a racist white society.

An example of this was the case of Bessie Flower who was a star pupil at her Aboriginal school. Hagenauer appears to have encouraged her to come to his mission to teach, but the covert plan was for her to marry one of his star converts. Bessie's parents were both Aboriginals whereas Hagenauer's convert and her husband designate, Adolph Donald Cameron, was a half-caste. They married when Bessie was seventeen and they had eight children. Both Adolph and Bessie left Hagenauer employment but Bessie found that the authorities were trying to separate her from her children. The Secretary (CEO) of the body in charge was Hagenauer.

In 1885, Hagenauer went to North Queensland for the Moravian Board in Saxony to investigate Aboriginal needs. He created a report that resulted in the establishment of the Mappon mission. He became board's acting secretary and general inspector on 1 July 1889. He retired in 1906.

== Personal life ==
Hagenauer married Christiana Louisa Knobloch at St. Paul's Church in Melbourne on 15 June 1861. She was a missionary from Saxony. They had nine children, most were born in Ramahyuck. Their son Henry Hagenauer played Australian rules football for Melbourne Football Club in the Victorian Football League.

Hagenauer died on 28 November 1909 at Lake Tyers.

== See also ==
- Hagenauer, Rev. Friedrich August (1829-1910) in German Missionaries in Australia

== Sources ==
- Hay, R. (2020) Aboriginal People and Australian Football in the Nineteenth Century, SESA Publications: Melbourne. ISBN 9780994601957.
