= August 1963 =

Month of 1963

| << | August 1963 | | | | | >> |
| Su | Mo | Tu | We | Th | Fr | Sa |
| | | | | 1 | 2 | 3 |
| 4 | 5 | 6 | 7 | 8 | 9 | 10 |
| 11 | 12 | 13 | 14 | 15 | 16 | 17 |
| 18 | 19 | 20 | 21 | 22 | 23 | 24 |
| 25 | 26 | 27 | 28 | 29 | 30 | 31 |

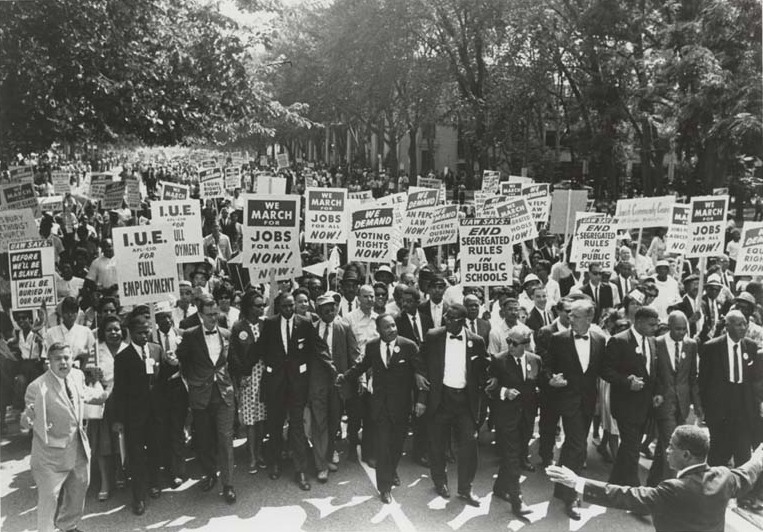
August 28, 1963: 250,000 March on Washington

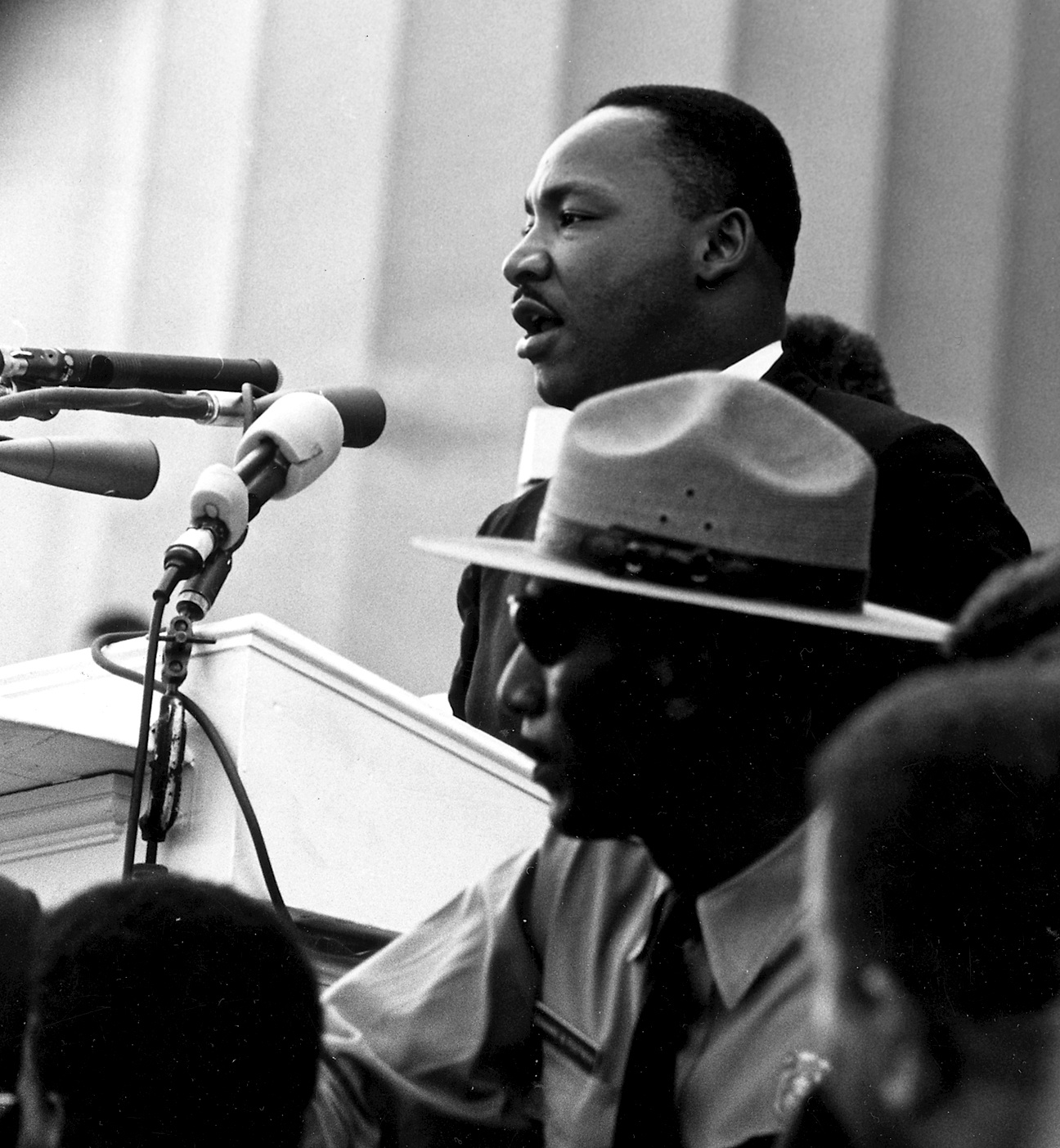
Martin Luther King Jr. delivering his "I Have a Dream" speech

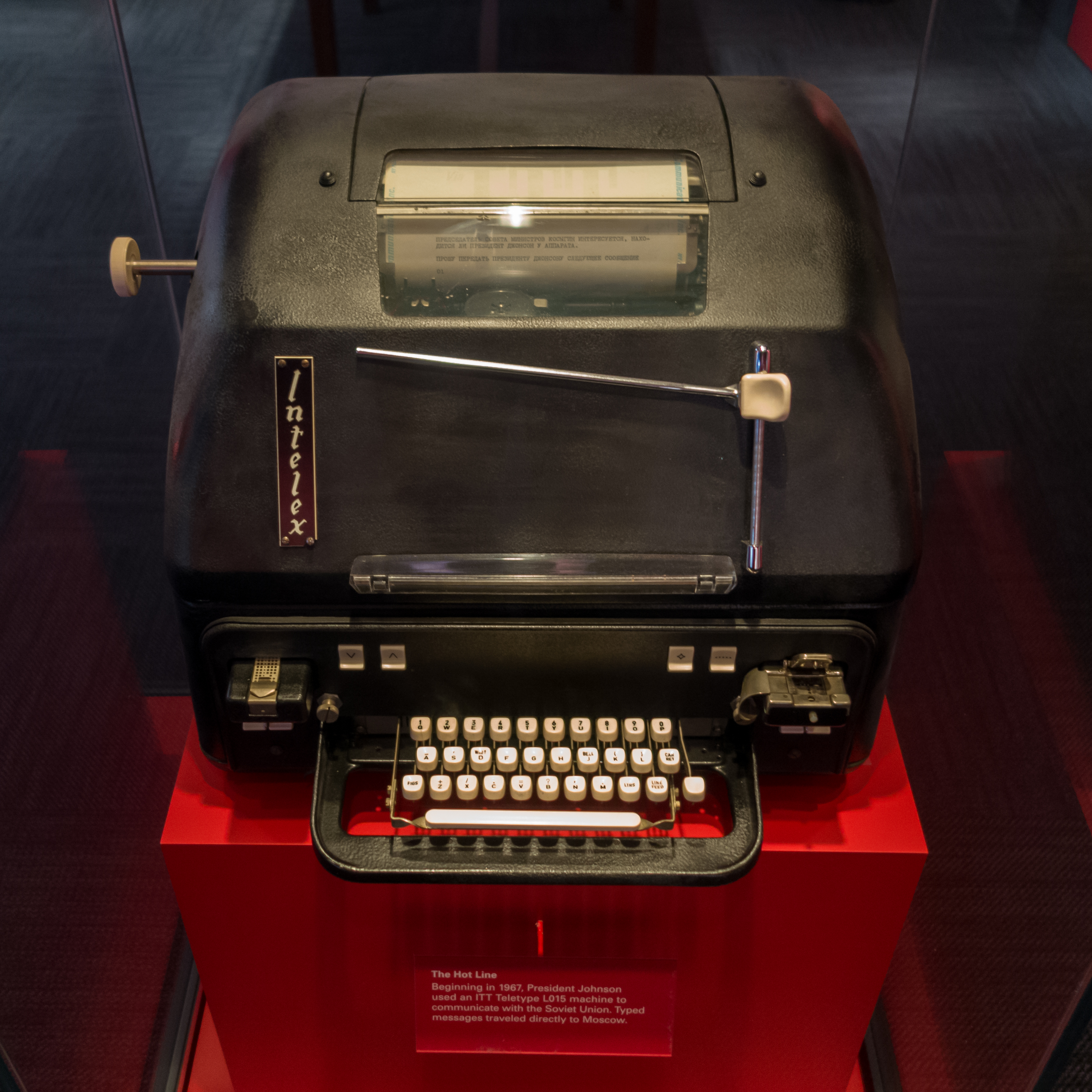
August 30, 1963: The Moscow-Washington hot line becomes operational (pictured, the original U.S. terminal, at the Johnson Presidential Library

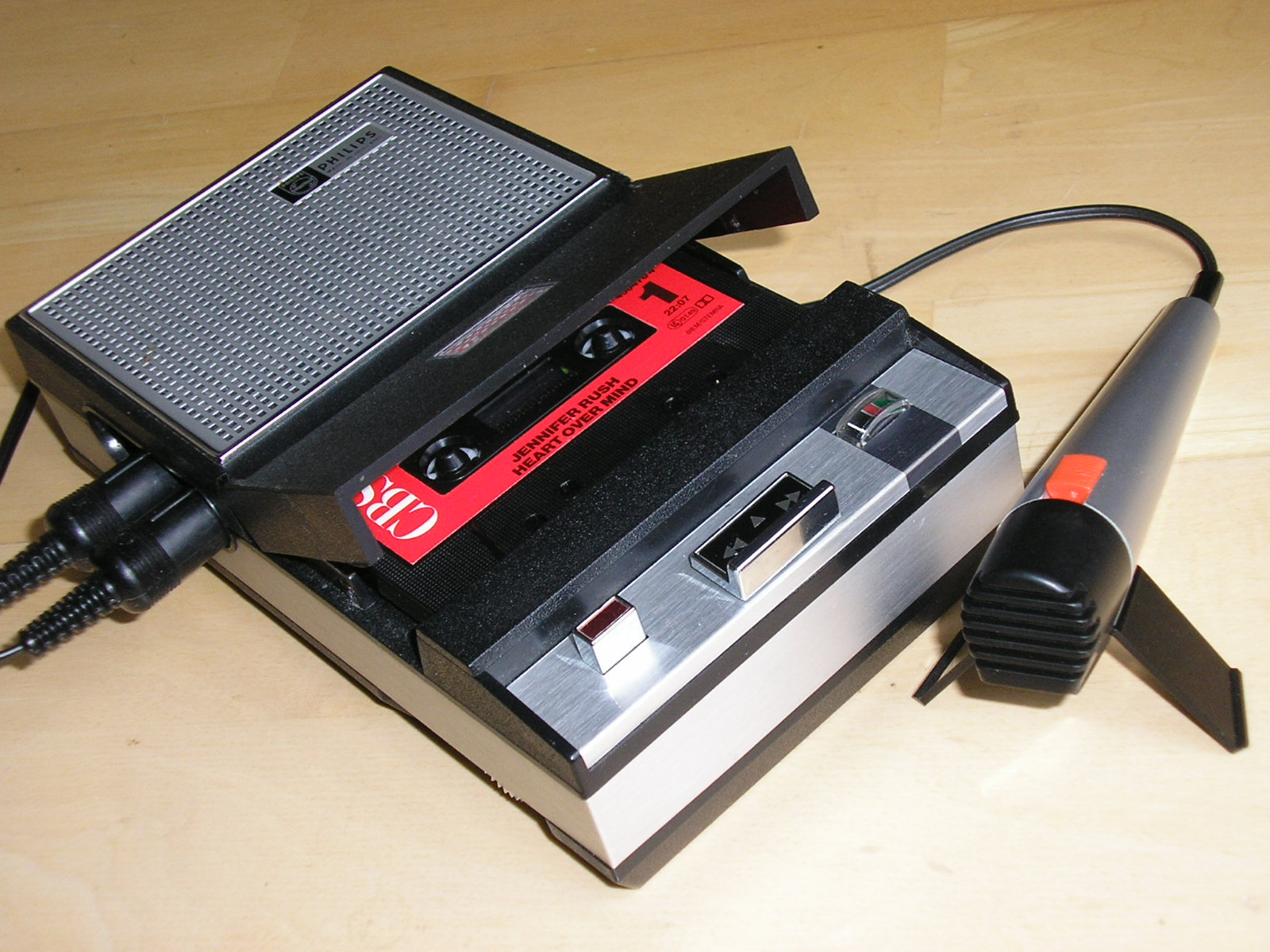
August 30, 1963: Philips introduces the cassette tape recorder

The following events occurred in August 1963:

== August 1, 1963 (Thursday) ==
- The "Protocol to Amend the Convention for the Unification of Certain Rules Relating to International Carriage by Air signed at Warsaw on 12 October 1929", commonly known as the Hague Protocol, came into effect.
- The first Design Engineering Inspection of the full-scale test vehicle of the Gemini Paraglider Landing System Program was done by North American Aviation and resulted in 30 requests for alterations.
- The United States amended its Single Integrated Operational Plan (SIOP) for nuclear war for the first time, altering the original plan that had been in place since July 1, 1962.
- George Harrison and Paul McCartney sang a duet on a Beatles tape recording of the Goffin-King song "Don't Ever Change" for later broadcast on BBC radio.
- An explosion at a gas station in the town of Hanmer near Sudbury, Ontario, Canada killed 8 people, including 5 children.
- The 11th World Scout Jamboree began, in Marathon, Greece.
- The Banque du Liban was established in Lebanon.
- Born: Coolio (stage name for Artis Ivey, Jr.) American rapper (d. 2022); in Monessen, Pennsylvania
- Died: Theodore Roethke, 55, American Pulitzer Prize-winning poet; of a heart attack

== August 2, 1963 (Friday) ==
- The Sino-Soviet split widened as the People's Republic of China, in its strongest condemnation to that time of the Soviet Union, criticized the Soviets as being "freaks and monsters" for making "unconditional concessions and capitulation to the imperialists" after the USSR had agreed to a partial nuclear test ban treaty with the United States and the United Kingdom. The statement came in an editorial in the Chinese Communist Party newspaper, the People's Daily.
- The NFL champion Green Bay Packers were upset, 20–17, by the College All-Stars in the annual Chicago College All-Star Game. It would be the last time that the All-Stars would win the series, which would be discontinued after the 1976 contest.
- José de Jesús García Ayala was consecrated as Auxiliary Bishop of Campeche. He would go on to become the oldest bishop in the Mexican church, living beyond his 100th birthday.
- A tropical storm off Bermuda intensified and was classified as Hurricane Arlene, though it would degenerate into a tropical depression the following day.

== August 3, 1963 (Saturday) ==
- The U.S.-launched Syncom 2, launched on July 26, was successfully lifted to an altitude of 22,500 miles (36,200 km) and achieved a speed of 6,880 miles per hour (11,070 km/h) in order to keep pace with the Earth's equatorial rotational movement of 1,040 miles per hour (1,670 km/h), becoming the first Earth-made object to achieve geosynchronous orbit. Syncom 2 remained fixed at a point near the equator and over Brazil.
- The Beatles performed at The Cavern Club in Liverpool for the 275th, and final time, nearly 18 months after their first appearance on the club's stage on February 9, 1961.
- Born:
  - James Hetfield, American singer/songwriter and founder of the rock band Metallica; in Downey, California
  - Tasmin Archer, English singer; in Bradford, Yorkshire
- Died:
  - Stephen Ward, 50, English osteopath and a central figure in the Profumo affair, died three days after taking an overdose of barbiturates. In his suicide note, he wrote, "It's a wish not to let them get me. I'd rather get myself."
  - Phil Graham, 48, publisher of The Washington Post newspaper and Newsweek magazine; by suicide

== August 4, 1963 (Sunday) ==
- At 5:00 in the morning, Haiti was invaded from the Dominican Republic by an army of 500 Haitian rebels seeking to overthrow the dictatorship of President Francois Duvalier, commonly referred to as "Papa Doc". The rebel forces crossed the border from the Dominican town of Dajabón to strike at Ouanaminthe, moving across the Rivière du Massacre/Rio Dajabón.
- The 1963 German Grand Prix was held at the Nürburgring and won by John Surtees, with Jim Clark finishing second. Clark remained well in first place in the world auto-driving championship standings, with 42 points, while Surtees was second at 22.
- The African Development Bank (AfDB) was created by agreement of the leaders of 33 African nations meeting in Khartoum, the capital of Sudan.
- Born: Keith Ellison, U.S. Representative for Minnesota from 2007 to 2019, the first Muslim to be elected to the United States Congress; in Detroit

== August 5, 1963 (Monday) ==
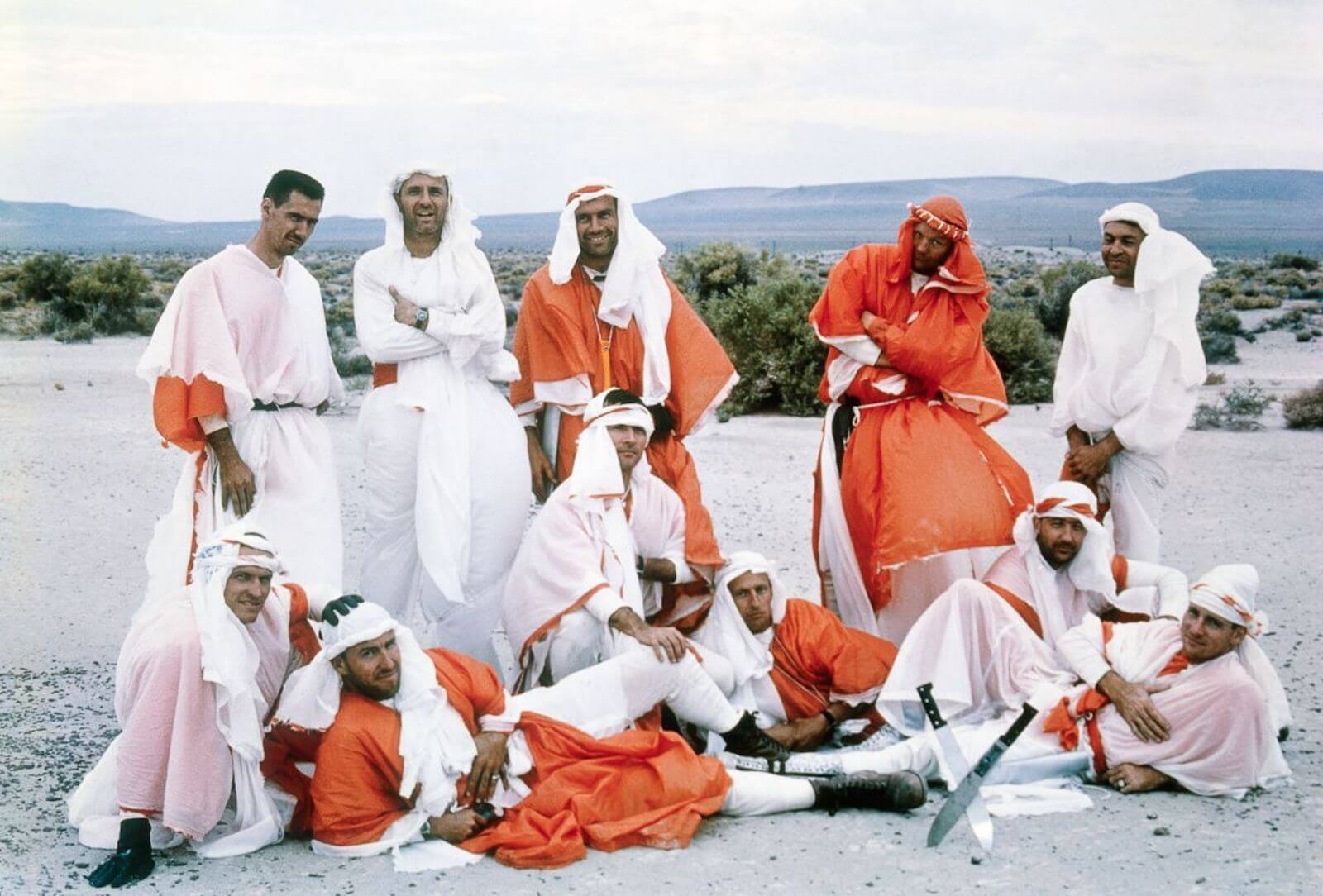
August 5, 1963: NASA astronauts dressed for survival in the Nevada desert

- All members of NASA Astronaut Group 2 and two of the Mercury astronauts began a five-day desert survival course at Stead Air Force Base in Nevada. The course, oriented toward Project Gemini missions, had (1) one and one-half days of academic presentations on characteristics of world desert areas and survival techniques; (2) one day of field demonstrations on use and care of survival equipment and use of the parachute in construction of clothing, shelters, and signals; and (3) two days of remote site training, when two-man teams were left alone in the desert to apply what they had learned from the academic and demonstration phases of the program.
- In Moscow, the United States, the United Kingdom, and the Soviet Union signed the first Nuclear Test Ban treaty. The ceremony took place at the Kremlin with U.S. Secretary of State Dean Rusk, British Foreign Secretary Alec Douglas-Home, and Soviet Foreign Minister Andrei Gromyko signing on behalf of their respective nations.
- Craig Breedlove set the record for fastest driver in the world, reaching 428.37 miles per hour (689.39 km/h) "for a measured mile" in a jet-powered vehicle, Spirit of America, on the Bonneville Salt Flats in Utah. His average for two runs was 407.45 miles per hour (655.73 km/h).
- The trial of Stephen Ward was formally closed with no sentence pronounced, two days after Ward's suicide.
- Born: Mark Strong, English actor; in London
- Died: Salvador Bacarisse, 64, Spanish composer

== August 6, 1963 (Tuesday) ==
- The United States Senate voted, 84 to 0, for a pay increase to nearly all members of the United States Armed Services, whether active or on reserve, three months after the House of Representatives had passed a "somewhat similar, but less generous bill".
- Died:
  - Lina Ruz González y Castro, 60, mother of Cuban leaders Fidel Castro and Raúl Castro
  - Sophus Nielsen, 75, Danish soccer player and manager

== August 7, 1963 (Wednesday) ==
- A freak escalator accident at the Garden State Park Racetrack in Cherry Hill, New Jersey, killed a man and his daughter. John Patrick Sweeney and 8-year-old Peggy Sweeney, of Maple Shade, New Jersey, were touring the closed park with a friend when they stepped over a box of tools that had been blocking the moving stairway, unaware that a protective plate at the top had been removed for maintenance. The two fell into the moving machinery and were crushed to death.
- United Nations Security Council Resolution 181 was passed, calling for a voluntary arms embargo of South Africa because of its racial discrimination. The United States and the United Kingdom abstained from the vote.
- Test pilot Jim Eastham made the first flight of the Lockheed YF-12 jet fighter over Nevada's Groom Dry Lake.
- The beach party film genre began with the release of AIP's Beach Party.
- Born: Patrick Bouvier Kennedy, son of U.S. President John F. Kennedy and First Lady Jacqueline Kennedy, by emergency caesarean section, five and a half weeks early, at the Otis Air Force Base Hospital in Bourne, Massachusetts. He was quickly transferred to the Children's Hospital Boston, and would die 39 hours later of respiratory problems.
- Died: Ramon Vila Capdevila, 55, nicknamed Caraquemada, Spanish rebel who was killed in a gun battle with Spanish Civil Guards

== August 8, 1963 (Thursday) ==
- The Great Train Robbery of 1963 took place at Ledburn, Buckinghamshire, England, when a gang of bandits halted a train ferrying mail between Glasgow and London. At 3:00 a.m., the group caused the train's engineer to stop by activating the red signal and covering the green signal. When the train came to a halt, engineer Jack Mills and his assistant were overpowered, while others in the group boarded the first two coaches hauling mail and tied up the four employees on board. The group then uncoupled the engine and two coaches from the other ten cars on the train, and forced the engineer and assistant to move one mile down the line to the Bridego Bridge, where the mail bags were dropped into automobiles waiting beneath. The haul was estimated at £2,600,000 (at the time worth about $7,300,000; equivalent to £70 million or $87,500,000 in 2023).
- Ndabaningi Sithole, future Zimbabwean prime minister (and later, president) Robert Mugabe, and other members of the Zimbabwe African People's Union formed the Zimbabwe African National Union (ZANU) after being dissatisfied with the leadership of Joshua Nkomo.
- Qualification testing of the Gemini parachute recovery system demonstrated water-impact accelerations low enough to make water landing safe.

== August 9, 1963 (Friday) ==
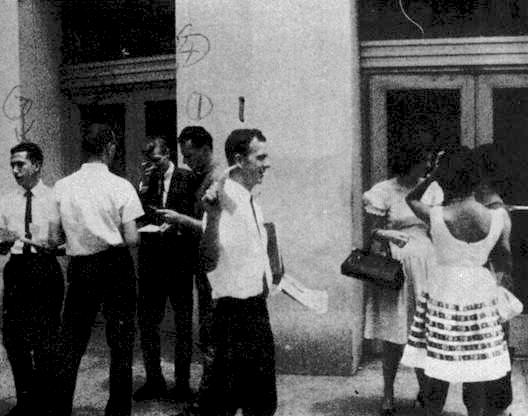
Oswald distributing leaflets in New Orleans on August 16, 1963

- American dissident Lee Harvey Oswald was arrested in New Orleans while distributing leaflets for the Fair Play for Cuba Committee at the corner of Canal Street and Baronne Street, after getting into a scuffle with three Cuban men (Carlos Bringuier, Celso Macario and Miguel Mariano), who were also arrested. Oswald spent the night in jail, and was then released. A week later, on August 16, Oswald again passed out Fair Play for Cuba leaflets with two hired helpers, this time in front of the International Trade Mart.
- Representatives of Manned Spacecraft Center (MSC), Arnold Engineering Development Center, McDonnell Aircraft Corporation, and Thiokol met to analyze problems in the Gemini retrorocket abort system. Several components, including retrorocket nozzle exit cones and mounting structure, had failed in recent tests at Arnold. After improvements, a retesting in October was successful.
- Hurricane Arlene passed directly over Bermuda with winds of 85 mph (137 km/h). The storm continued to intensify after passing the island, with a barometric pressure of 969 mbar (969 hPa; 28.6 inHg) and winds reaching 105 mph (169 km/h). The hurricane weakened and was downgraded to an extratropical cyclone as it moved out to sea.
- The British rock music show Ready Steady Go! premiered on Associated-Rediffusion in London, part of Britain's ITV network, and would later be shown on the other ITV stations. It would run until December 7, 1966.
- Born: Whitney Houston, American pop singer (d. 2012); in Newark, New Jersey
- Died: Patrick Bouvier Kennedy, two-day-old son of President John F. Kennedy, of infant respiratory distress syndrome. A funeral mass for the child was held the next day in the private chapel of Cardinal Richard Cushing in Boston.

== August 10, 1963 (Saturday) ==
- A new record was set for latest ending to a Major League Baseball game, when the second game of a doubleheader between the Pittsburgh Pirates, and the visiting Houston Colt .45s (now the Astros) lasted until 2:30 in the morning. The first game had been delayed for an hour by rain. Only 300 of the original 9,420 fans stayed to watch Pittsburgh win 7–6 after 11 innings. The record would be broken on June 13, 1967, when a Washington Senators' 6–5 win over the Chicago White Sox ended at 2:44 a.m.
- Giovanni Colombo became Archbishop of Milan, replacing Pope Paul VI, who had been elected to the papacy two months earlier.
- Born: Phoolan Devi, Indian bandit and politician (d. 2001); in Ghura Ka Purwa, Uttar Pradesh state
- Died: Estes Kefauver, 60, American politician who almost won the 1952 Democratic presidential nomination and then served as running-mate for nominee Adlai Stevenson II in 1956.

== August 11, 1963 (Sunday) ==
- Four of the defendants who had been arrested on July 11, at the Liliesleaf Farm near Johannesburg, were able to escape their South African jail after a bribe was promised to their guard by the ANC. Harold Wolpe and Arthur Goldreich, who were both white, were confined at Johannesburg's Marshall Square Police Station, in the same cell with Indian South Africans Abdulhay Jassat and Moosa Moolla, separate from the black South African defendants. Their white guard, Johannes Greeff, served three years of a six-year sentence, and later received 2,000 African pounds. Wolpe and Goldreich would elude a nationwide search and, "disguised as priests", make it to Swaziland (which was surrounded by South Africa), and on September 8, would charter a plane to fly to Tanganyika.
- Lieutenant General Song Yo-Chang, former Prime Minister of South Korea, was arrested on orders of the President and his former superior officer, General Park Chung-hee. On August 8, General Song had published a letter in the nation's newspapers, calling on General Park not to run in the October elections.
- Two teams of surgeons, at Children's Hospital Los Angeles, carried out the successful separation of a pair of conjoined twins, Daniel Bartley and David Bartley, 27 hours after their birth. The two were joined at the abdomen. Daniel died three days later, on August 14.
- Food poisoning struck about 150 of 800 women who had attended a dinner at which the Archbishop of Boston, Richard Cardinal Cushing, was the guest speaker.
- Benoni Beheyt won the 1963 UCI Road World Championships bicycle race at Renaix, Belgium.
- Jim Clark won the 1963 Kanonloppet motor race at Karlskoga Circuit in Sweden.
- Died:
  - Clem Bevans, 83, American vaudeville star and film actor
  - Charles Seymour, 78, American academician

== August 12, 1963 (Monday) ==
- Jomo Kenyatta, President of Kenya, spoke to 300 white farmers at Nakuru, and reassured them that the new black African government would look after their interests if they remained. "To the chagrin of many freedom fighters, his prophecy turned out to be accurate", one commentator would observe later about the former Mau Mau Uprising leader.
- Fifteen of the 16 people on board an Air-Inter flight were killed when the Viscount airplane they were on crashed while attempting a landing in a thunderstorm at Lyon. The airplane, which was stopping at Lille on the way to Nice, struck a barn as it descended, and debris from the wreckage killed the farm owner. The sole survivor was a three-year-old girl.
- Born: Kōji Kitao, Japanese sumo wrestler (d. 2019); in Mie

== August 13, 1963 (Tuesday) ==
- The "Trois Glorieuses" uprising began in Congo-Brazzaville (formerly the French Congo), as political rallies degenerated into violent clashes. Striking workers in the capital, Brazzaville, stormed the city prison and released all of the inmates.
- Born:
  - Sridevi, Indian actress cited as the "first female superstar" of Indian cinema; as Shree Amma Ayyapan in Meenampatti, Madras State (died of cardiac arrest, 2018)
  - Édouard Michelin, managing partner and co-chief executive of the Michelin Group in 1999; in Clermont-Ferrand (died by drowning, 2006)
  - Valerie Plame, American CIA Operations Officer who was identified after a leak from a U.S. State Department official; in Anchorage, Alaska

== August 14, 1963 (Wednesday) ==
- A forest fire in Brazil killed 110 people and caused damage in 128 villages and towns in the state of Paraná. The fire, which broke out in four districts around the city of Londrina, started when local farmers were clearing their land by setting small blazes that grew out of control. Eventually, two million hectares or 20,000 square kilometres (7,700 sq mi) were burned by the blaze before it was brought under control. Besides the 110 known dead, another 1,000 were injured and 5,700 families were left homeless. The death toll may have been as high as 250 people, more than twice the official report.
- British police arrested five people believed to have been members of the gang that had carried out the robbery of the Glasgow-London mail train the previous week and recovered £100,000 of the loot that had been stolen.
- The first of the Yirrkala bark petitions, created by Aboriginal leaders in the Arnhem Land region of the Northern Territory of Australia, were presented to Australian governmental leaders at the capital in Canberra.
- Hamburger SV won the 1962–63 DFB-Pokal, the second-most important national competition in German football.
- Died: Clifford Odets, 57, American playwright

== August 15, 1963 (Thursday) ==
- Fulbert Youlou was forced to resign as president of the Republic of Congo, after a three-day uprising in the capital. A delegation of military leaders, led by Colonel David Mountsaka and Major Felix Mouzabakani, refused to obey President Youlou's order for the Congolese Army to shoot at the protesters, and demanded his resignation. Youlou was replaced the next day by Alphonse Massamba-Débat, who was designated by the title "chief of government", rather than president. He would be imprisoned until being freed by his supporters on February 7, 1964.
- The last of the American nuclear Thor missiles, located in the United Kingdom at the 144th Strategic Missile Squadron at North Luffenham, was taken off of alert, ending a process that had started on November 29. The missiles were removed by September 27, and the missile facilities closed by December 20.
- A team of scientists from Yale University and the Brookhaven National Laboratory announced their discovery of what was believed at the time to be the last class of subatomic particle, the hyperon referred to as "anti-xi-zero".
- Born: Simon Brown, Jamaican boxer, IBF welterweight champion (1988–1991), and WBC light middleweight champion (1993–1994); in Clarendon
- Died:
  - Eddie Mays, 34, the last person to be executed in the state of New York; in the electric chair at Sing Sing prison
  - Karl Drews, 43, former American MLB pitcher from 1946 to 1954; by a drunk driver
  - John Powell, 80, American pianist, ethnomusicologist and composer
  - Vsevolod Ivanov, 68, Soviet novelist

== August 16, 1963 (Friday) ==
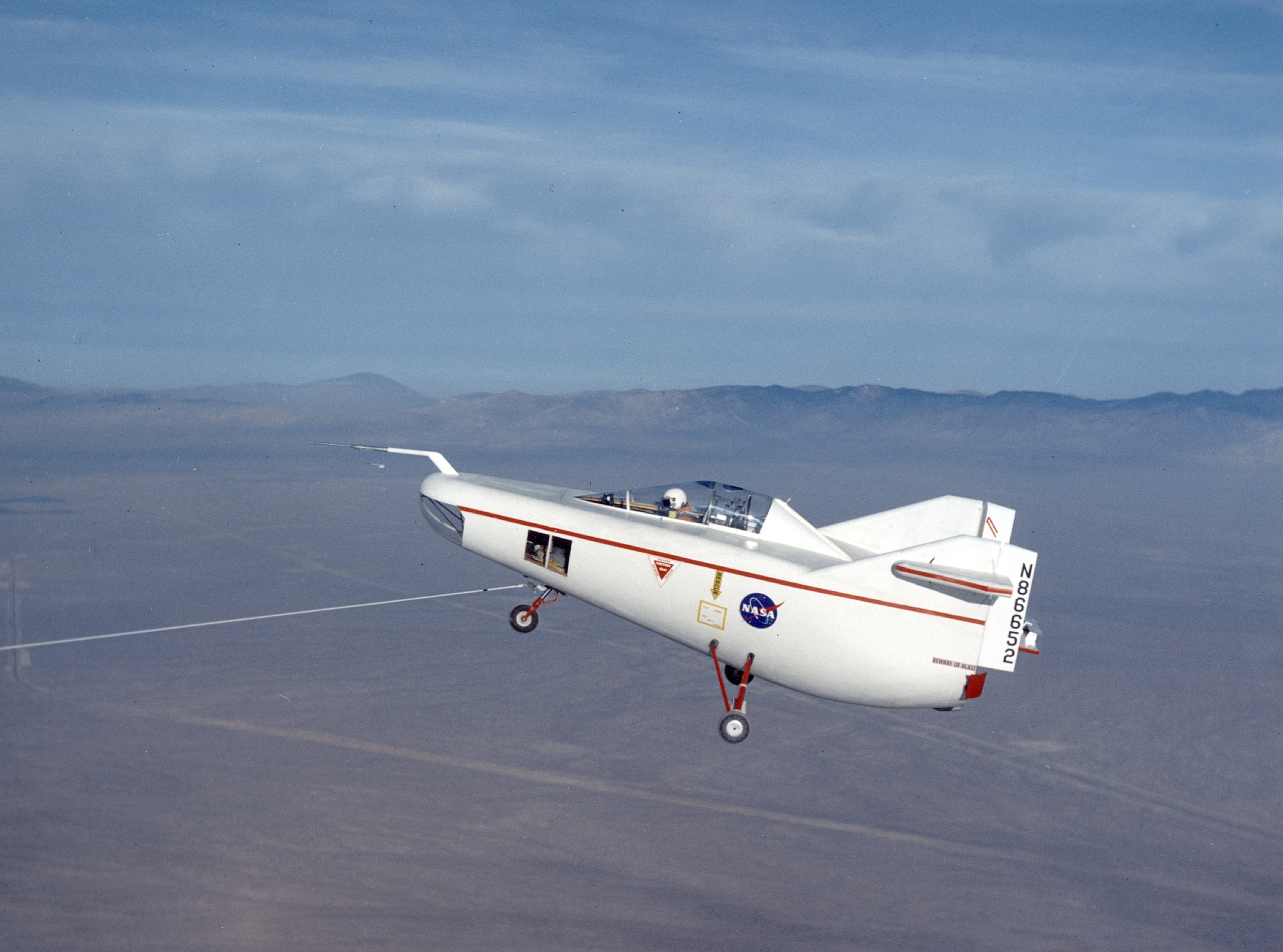
August 16, 1963: NASA M2-F1 in flight

- Test pilot Milton Orville Thompson made the first flight of the NASA M2-F1, a wingless lifting body glider nicknamed the "flying bathtub". The lifting body design, which permitted a spacecraft to descend horizontally through the atmosphere, would be put into service through the U.S. Space Shuttle.
- Former President of Venezuela Marcos Pérez Jiménez was extradited from the United States back to Venezuela, eight months after his arrest and confinement in the Dade County Jail in Miami. Perez Jimenez had been dictator from 1952 to 1958, then fled to the U.S., where he lived in luxury until being jailed in Miami on December 12, 1962.
- Two people walking in Dorking Woods discovered a briefcase, a holdall and a camel-skin bag, all containing money. The evidence would lead to the arrest of Brian Field, a member of the gang who had carried out the Great Train Robbery a few days earlier. The discovery raised the total amount of money recovered to £141,000 ($394,800).
- Canada's new Prime Minister, Lester B. Pearson, reversed the policy of his predecessor, John G. Diefenbaker, and announced that his government had agreed with the United States to arm American-deployed missiles with nuclear warheads.
- Born: Christine Cavanaugh, American voice actress known for voicing Chuckie Finster in the cartoon series Rugrats (d. 2014); in Layton, Utah

== August 17, 1963 (Saturday) ==
- Fifty-five people were drowned when the Japanese ferry boat Midori Maru capsized in heavy waves as it sailed from the Okinawan capital to Kumejima Island. Another 185 of the passengers and crew were rescued by fishing boats and U.S. military aircraft.
- Died:
  - Richard Barthelmess, 68, American silent film actor who was nominated for Best Actor in the first Academy Award ceremony
  - Ed Gardner, 62, American radio comedian who starred in the series Duffy's Tavern

== August 18, 1963 (Sunday) ==
- James Meredith became the first African-American to graduate from the University of Mississippi in its 115 years of existence. He earned a Bachelor of Arts degree, having majored in political science and minored in French. The cost of Meredith's protection by federal marshals was more than $5,000,000. His graduation day was without incident; Meredith would later earn a law degree from Columbia University.
- The last match in the third round of the 1963 CONCACAF Champions' Cup was played at the Estadio Nacional in Costa Rica. The final, scheduled to be played the following month, would eventually be scratched, and Racing Club Haïtien would eventually be declared champion.

== August 19, 1963 (Monday) ==
- Israel's Prime Minister Levi Eshkol agreed to allow American observers to visit the Negev Nuclear Research Center at Dimona, where Israel was working on developing a nuclear weapon.
- Born:
  - Monday Michiru, Japanese "acid jazz" musician and actress; in Tokyo, to jazz pianist Toshiko Akiyoshi and jazz saxophonist Charlie Mariano
  - John Stamos, American TV actor and producer; in Cypress, California
- Died:
  - Maulvi Tamizuddin Khan, 74, Pakistani politician, President (speaker) of Pakistan's first Constituent Assembly
  - Jay Meuser, 51, American abstract expressionist painter

== August 20, 1963 (Tuesday) ==
- In the case of Curtis Publishing Co. v. Butts, former University of Georgia football coach Wally Butts won a $3,060,000 judgment in his libel lawsuit against the Saturday Evening Post magazine. The March 19, 1963 issue of the magazine alleged in an article that Butts and University of Alabama coach Bear Bryant had conspired to fix the outcome of the game between their schools. The jury verdict would later be reduced to $460,000 by the trial court, but would be upheld by the United States Supreme Court.
- In the Bristol South East by-election, Tony Benn regained his seat in the House of Commons. Benn had been forced to resign Commons in 1960, when he inherited a peerage, becoming the 2nd Viscount Stansgate (and a member of the House of Lords) on his father's death. Benn had won the by-election on May 4 but had been disqualified by law. When the Peerage Act 1963 took effect, Benn renounced his peerage, ran again and received 79.7% of the vote.
- The Israeli government informed the United Nations Special Committee on apartheid that it had taken all necessary steps to ensure that no arms, ammunition, or strategic materials would be exported from Israel to South Africa in any form, directly or indirectly.
- The Royal Shakespeare Company introduced its performance cycle of Shakespeare's history plays under the title The Wars of the Roses, adapted and directed by John Barton and Peter Hall, at the Royal Shakespeare Theatre, Stratford-upon-Avon.
- Rocketdyne began testing its new thrust chamber assembly (TCA) design for the Gemini reentry control system (RCS) and the orbit attitude and maneuver system (OAMS). Design verification testing was completed in October.
- The 1,000,000th Carload of lettuce departes California for the east coast.

== August 21, 1963 (Wednesday) ==
- Victor Mostovoy, the pilot of a disabled Aeroflot Tupolev Tu-124 airliner, successfully made an emergency landing in the Neva River at Leningrad after the jet developed engine trouble. The Tu-124 remained afloat, and all 52 people on board were able to escape without injury.
- The first of five flight tests in the Gemini malfunction detection system (MDS) piggyback series was made with the Titan II rocket. Because of a short circuit, all MDS parameter data was lost 81 seconds after liftoff. Performance would be verified by the final test on March 23, 1964.
- The Army of the Republic of Vietnam Special Forces, on orders of President Ngô Đình Diệm and his brother, Ngô Đình Nhu, arrested thousands of monks and nuns (some of whom would die in prison or disappear entirely), and vandalised Buddhist pagodas across South Vietnam.
- Lee Harvey Oswald, identifying himself as New Orleans representative of the Fair Play for Cuba Committee, debated against Cuban exile Carlos Bringuier in a live radio program on the New Orleans station WDSU-AM.
- U.S. President Kennedy issued a Presidential Memorandum establishing the National Communications System.
- MSC ordered the procurement of eight Atlas rockets for the Gemini program, at a cost of $40,000,000.
- The Soviet Union established diplomatic relations with Jordan for the first time.
- Born: King Mohammed VI of Morocco, son of King Hassan II of Morocco and Lalla Latifa Hammou; in Rabat
- Died: Gladys Dick, 81, American physician and co-developer of the vaccine against scarlet fever

== August 22, 1963 (Thursday) ==
- Lloyd Miller Jr., convicted in 1956 of the murder and rape of an 8-year-old girl, was given a stay of execution seven hours before he was scheduled to die in the electric chair at the Stateville Correctional Center in Illinois. U.S. District Court Judge Bernard M. Decker issued a writ of habeas corpus to halt proceedings while Miller's attorneys continued to pursue an appeal. Three-and-a-half years later, on February 13, 1967, the U.S. Supreme Court would reverse Miller's conviction after it was determined that the prosecutor in Fulton County, Illinois, had presented faked evidence at Miller's trial, and Miller would be set free on March 20 after more than ten years behind bars.
- American test pilot Joe Walker made a second sub-orbital spaceflight, according to the international standard of 100 kilometers, piloting an X-15 rocket plane to an altitude of 354,200 feet (67.08 mi; 108.0 km). The record was unofficial, because the X-15 did not take off from the ground under its own power, and was sent up by an air launch. Walker's flight would remain the highest ever achieved by an airplane for more than fifty years, until broken on October 4, 2004, when Brian Binnie would pilot SpaceShipOne to an altitude of 367,500 feet (112,000 m; 112.0 km).
- Died: Eric Johnston, 66, American motion picture executive who had served as president of the Motion Picture Association of America since 1945

== August 23, 1963 (Friday) ==
- Einar Gerhardsen resigned as Prime Minister of Norway after losing a motion of no confidence by a two-vote margin. The 76–74 vote came about when two deputies in the Storting (Finn Gustavsen and Asbjørn Holm) broke with the ruling Labor Party to vote against Gerhardsen.
- Born:
  - Stephanie Biddle, Canadian jazz musician; in LaSalle, Quebec
  - Glória Pires, Brazilian actress; in Rio de Janeiro

== August 24, 1963 (Saturday) ==
- Newspaper photographer John O'Gready took the iconic photograph The Gladiators, showing opposing players Norm Provan and Arthur Summons embracing at the end of the 1963 NSW Rugby League Premiership Grand Final at Sydney Cricket Ground.
- The very first games of the Bundesliga, composed of the 16 best professional soccer football teams in West Germany, were played, with all eight matches starting at 5:00 p.m. In Bremen, Timo Konietzka of Borussia Dortmund scored the first goal in league history, 59 seconds into the match against SV Werder Bremen, although Bremen would win 3–2. In other contests, Meidericher SV beat Karlsruher SC, 4–1; FC Schalke 04 defeated VfB Stuttgart, 2–0; 1. FC Köln won 2–0 over FC Saarbrücken. The other four games ended in 1–1 draws.
- With conditional approval by President Kennedy, the U.S. Department of State sent what would later become known as "Cable 243" to Ambassador Henry Cabot Lodge in South Vietnam. The wording of the message, which was dispatched after the violent Xá Lợi Pagoda raids, included the statement that the Ambassador should "make detailed plans as to how we might bring about Diem's replacement if this should become necessary", and implied support for a coup against President Ngo Dinh Diem.
- John Pennel, who had broken the world record in the pole vault on August 5, became the first person to vault more than 17 feet (5.2 m), vaulting 17 feet 0.75 inches (5.2007 m) in a meet near his hometown, at the University of Miami.

== August 25, 1963 (Sunday) ==
- All 26 people aboard the Greek freighter MV Donald (formerly the U.S. Navy cargo ship USS Cabell) disappeared shortly after the captain reported by radio that he was encountering bad weather in the Indian Ocean. The ship had been en route to Indonesia with a cargo of 5,000 tonnes (4,900 long tons; 5,500 short tons) of iron, and was never found after being reported as missing a month later by the Greek Ministry of Merchant Marine.
- McDonnell completed the fabrication and assembly of Gemini spacecraft No. 1 with the mating of the spacecraft's major modules. The spacecraft passed its final roll-out inspection on October 1 and was shipped to Atlantic Missile Range October 4.
- Nearly three years after the December 15, 1960 decision by King Mahendra of Nepal to abolish the nation's short-lived elected legislature, the King held the first meeting of the new "National Guidance Council" as an advisory body.
- Died: Karl Probst, 79, American automobile engineer who, in 1940, designed the U.S. Army's "G.P." (general purpose) vehicle, which would become known as the "jeep"

== August 26, 1963 (Monday) ==
- In a meeting with U.S. President Kennedy, Soviet Ambassador Anatoly Dobrynin told Kennedy that all Soviet combat troops had been removed from Cuba. In actuality, one brigade of Soviet troops had remained after the end of the Cuban Missile Crisis, at the request of Fidel Castro. The existence of the brigade would not be discovered by U.S. intelligence until 1979.
- Born: Cristina Favre-Moretti and Isabella Crettenand-Moretti, twin sisters Swiss ski mountaineers who both won gold medals in the 2004 World Championships

== August 27, 1963 (Tuesday) ==
- Singaporean bar waitress Jenny Cheok disappeared at sea during a scuba diving trip near Sisters' Islands, Singapore. Initially considered as a missing persons case, it was found that Cheok was killed by her boyfriend, Sunny Ang, for her insurance money, which amounted to $450,000 in total. Despite the circumstantial evidence and lack of a body, Ang would be convicted on May 19, 1965 for murder, making the case one of the most sensational murder cases in Singapore's legal history. Ang would be executed in Changi Prison on February 6, 1967. Till this day, Cheok's body has never been found.

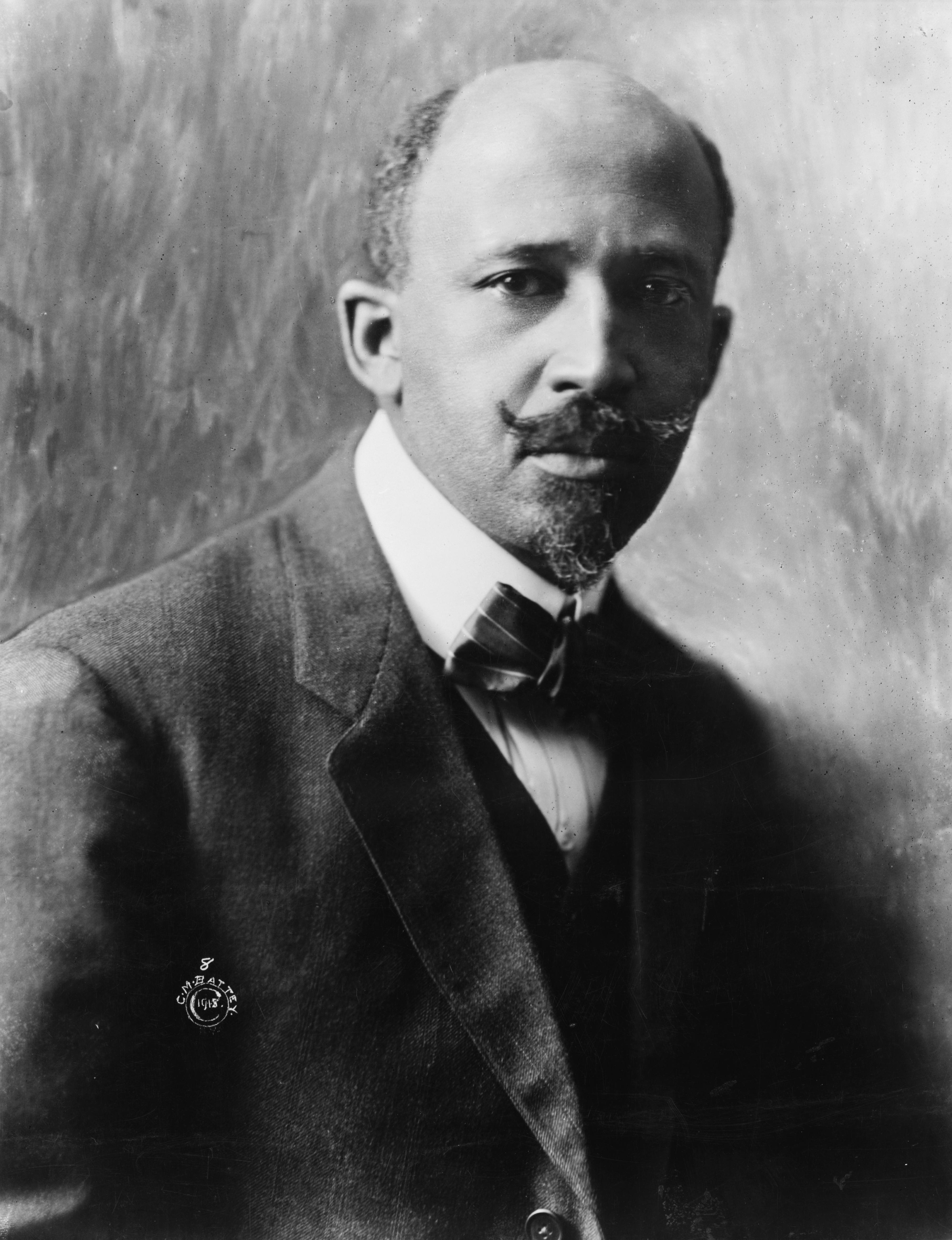
Du Bois

- Less than six hours before the railroads of the United States were scheduled to be shut down by a walkout of railway employees, President Kennedy signed anti-strike legislation that had been passed minutes earlier by the U.S. House of Representatives. The vote in the House, finished at 4:42 p.m., was 286–66 on a bill that had passed the U.S. Senate on August 22. President Kennedy signed the bill into law at 6:14 p.m., ending the strike that had been scheduled for one minute after midnight.
- Japanese Construction Minister Ichirō Kōno announced that the government would construct a new city on undeveloped land in "a very suitable place near Mount Tsukuba". The "Tsukuba Science City", located 35 miles (56 km) northeast of Tokyo and intended as a community for researchers and scientists, would be ready for its first residents after ten years of construction, and would have over 200,000 residents within 50 years.
- Eighteen miners were killed in an explosion at an underground potash mine near Moab, Utah, but five men were able to survive the carbon monoxide by finding an air pocket, 2,712 feet (827 m) below the surface, and were lifted to safety by rescue workers.
- Born: Greg Daniels, former Australian rules footballer who played for Collingwood in the Victorian Football League (VFL) in 1986
- Died:
  - W. E. B. Du Bois, 95, African-American professor and civil rights activist, who later became a citizen of Ghana; of health problems
  - Inayatullah Khan Mashriqi, 75, Indian mathematician, logician, political theorist, Islamic scholar and the founder of the Khaksar movement
  - Werner Kuhn, 64, Swiss physical chemist

== August 28, 1963 (Wednesday) ==
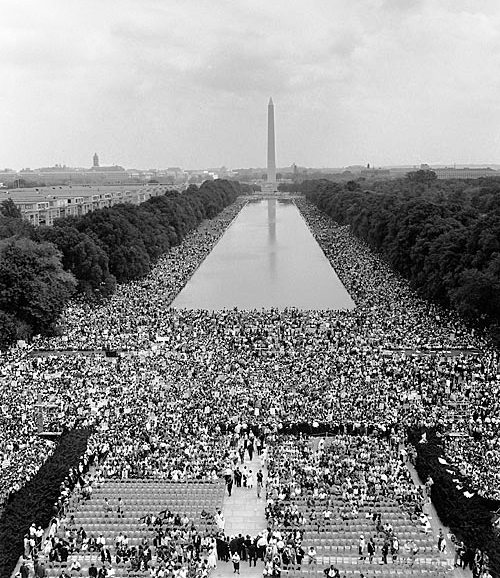
August 28, 1963: Marchers at the Lincoln Memorial

- At the "March on Washington" (officially, the March on Washington for Jobs and Freedom), Reverend Martin Luther King Jr. delivered his "I Have A Dream" speech on the steps of the Lincoln Memorial to an audience of at least 250,000 people.
- The "Career Girls Murders" were committed as Janice Wylie, a 21-year-old researcher for Newsweek magazine, and her roommate, 22-year-old schoolteacher Emily Hoffert, were stabbed to death in their luxury apartment on New York's Upper East Side. An innocent man would be convicted of the murders and imprisoned until the discovery of the actual killer, Richard Robles.
- John Lyng became Prime Minister of Norway, forming the first government in 28 years not to be led by the Norwegian Labour Party. Lyng's government would last for only one month.
- Two U.S. Air Force KC-135 Stratotankers collided over the Atlantic Ocean and crashed.

== August 29, 1963 (Thursday) ==
- Henry Cabot Lodge Jr., the U.S. Ambassador to South Vietnam, sent a top secret cable to the White House, reporting that "We are launched on a course from which there is no turning back: the overthrow of the [Ngo Dinh] Diem government." At noon in Washington, D.C., President Kennedy held a conference with his Secretaries of State, Defense and the Treasury, as well as with the CIA Director, after which Kennedy authorized a reply to Lodge, which included the statement that "The USG [United States Government] will support a coup which has good chance of succeeding but plans no direct involvement of U.S. Armed Forces."
- The Policlínico Bancario bank in Argentina was robbed by members of Tacuara Nationalist Movement, who stole 14,000,000 Argentine pesos (equivalent to US$100,000), and killed two bank employees in the process.
- Gulzarilal Nanda replaced Lal Bahadur Shastri as India's Minister for Home Affairs.

== August 30, 1963 (Friday) ==
- The Moscow–Washington hotline began operations, as the U.S. Department of Defense made a one-sentence announcement to the world press: "The direct communication link between Washington and Moscow is now operational." Because the spoken word could be misunderstood, the hot line was actually a link of teletype machines rather than the red telephone commonly depicted in television and film.

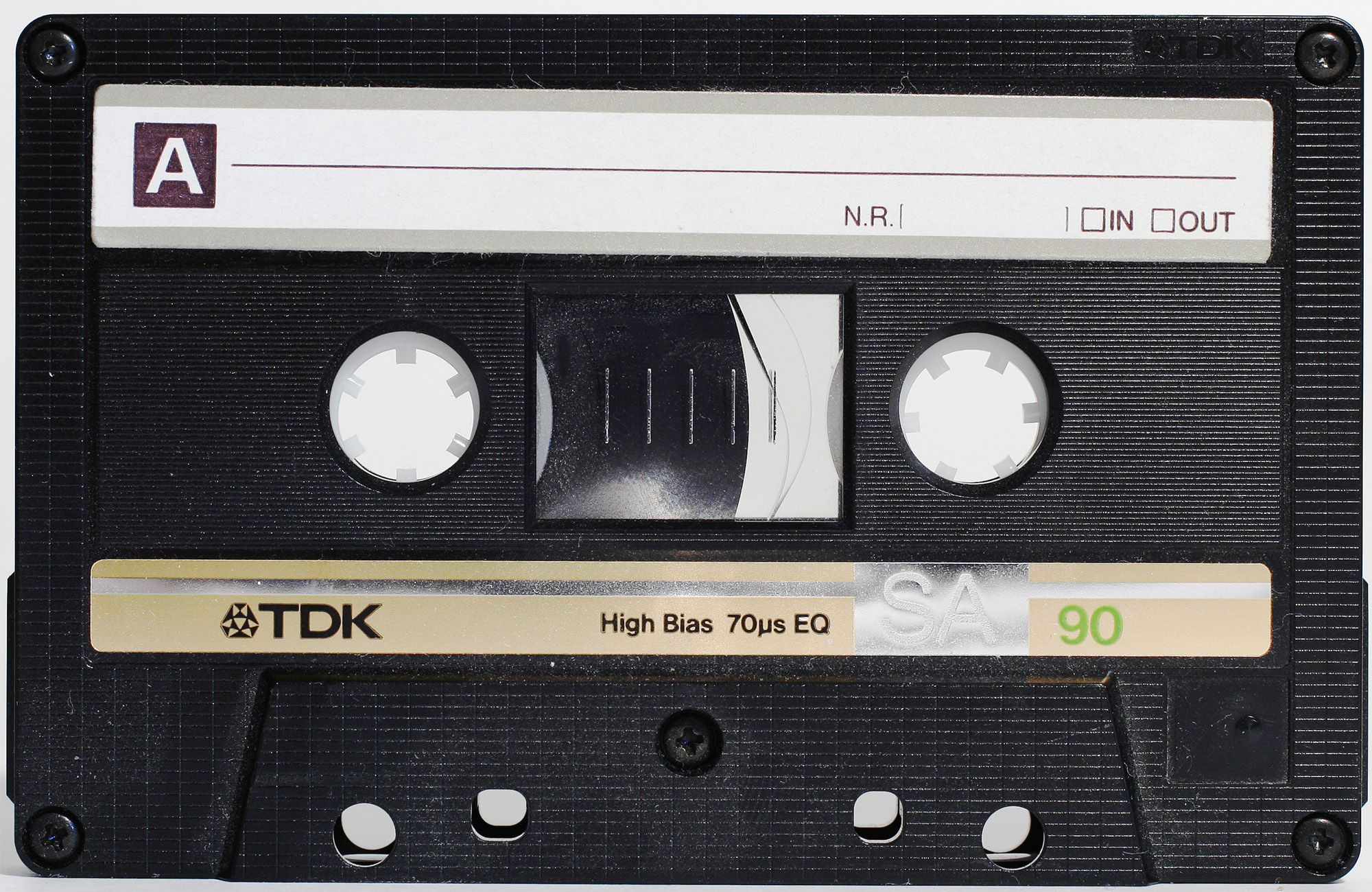
The standard for cassette tapes

- The modern audio cassette tape and the tape recorder that used it were both introduced to the public by the Philips Company, at the annual Internationale Funkausstellung Berlin, an exhibition of the latest consumer technology, in West Germany. For the next 30 years, the "cassette" would be the standard form of portable recorded music.
- Kansas City Chiefs rookie Stone Johnson, a former United States Olympic sprinter, sustained a fractured vertebra in his neck during a kickoff return in a preseason game against the Houston Oilers in Wichita, Kansas. Johnson would die on September 8 as a result of the injury.
- Born:
  - Paul Oakenfold, British record producer and DJ; in Mile End, London
  - John King, American journalist; in Dorchester, Massachusetts
- Died:
  - Eddie Mannix, 72, American film executive
  - Axel Stordahl, 50, American bandleader
  - Guy Burgess, 52, British spy

== August 31, 1963 (Saturday) ==
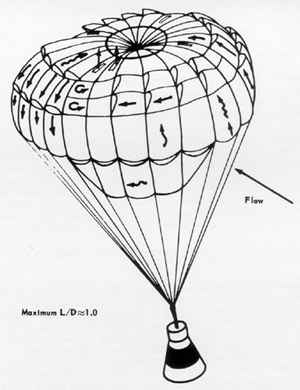
Proposed Gemini parasail landing system

- Gemini Project Office (GPO) reported that it was investigating the use of a parasail and landing rocket system to enable the Gemini spacecraft to make ground landings rather than splashing down at sea. Major system components were the parasail, drogue parachute, retrorocket, control system, and landing rocket. Unlike the conventional parachute, the parasail was capable of controlled gliding and turning. Landing rockets, fired just before touchdown, reduced the spacecraft rate of descent to less than 11 feet (3.4 m) per second or 7.5 miles per hour (12.1 km/h). After a briefing by GPO to NASA Headquarters on September 6, no further action was taken on the parasail and landings of U.S. spacecraft would continue to be in the ocean until the first space shuttle flight in 1981.
- Singapore declared its independence from the United Kingdom, with Yusof bin Ishak as the head of state (Yang di-Pertuan Negara) and Lee Kuan Yew as prime minister. Sixteen days later, Singapore would join the Federation of Malaysia, but would declare independence again on August 9, 1965.
- John Dalgleish Donaldson and his first wife, Henrietta Clark Horne, married at Port Seton, Scotland. One of their daughters, Mary Donaldson (born 1972), would marry Frederik, Crown Prince of Denmark in 2010 and become Mary, Crown Princess of Denmark.
- GPO reported that the Gemini Guidance Computer was in its final factory testing phase and would be ready for inertial guidance system integration testing on September 6.
- British North Borneo became the self-governing territory known as Sabah, pending the establishment of the Federation of Malaysia later in the year.
- The National Museum of Malaysia opened, on the sixth anniversary of the independence of Malaya.
- Winston P. Wilson became chief of the U.S. National Guard Bureau.
- Died: Georges Braque, 81, French painter and sculptor
