= Keith Milte =

Australian rules footballer, born 1917

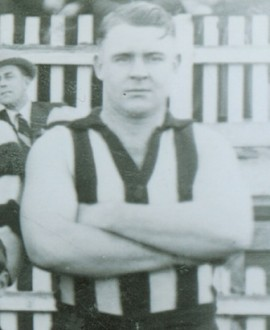
- Milte during his Collingwood career

Personal information
- Full name: Harold Keith Milte
- Born: 28 May 1917; Sea Lake, Victoria
- Died: 21 August 2003 (aged 86)
- Original team: Lascelles / Coburg
- Height: 180 cm (5 ft 11 in)
- Weight: 86 kg (190 lb)

Playing career^{1}
Years	Club	Games (Goals)
1938	Geelong	1 (0)
1940–41	Coburg (VFA)	32 (15)
1942–43	Collingwood	10 (7)
1945–47	Coburg (VFA)	56 (64)
- ^{1} Playing statistics correct to the end of 1945.

Harold Keith Milte (28 May 1917 – 21 August 2003) was an Australian rules footballer who played with Geelong and Collingwood in the Victorian Football League (VFL).

Milte served in the Australian Army during the Second World War, enlisting in Geelong in 1940.
