= USS Cabell =

Cargo ship of the United States Navy

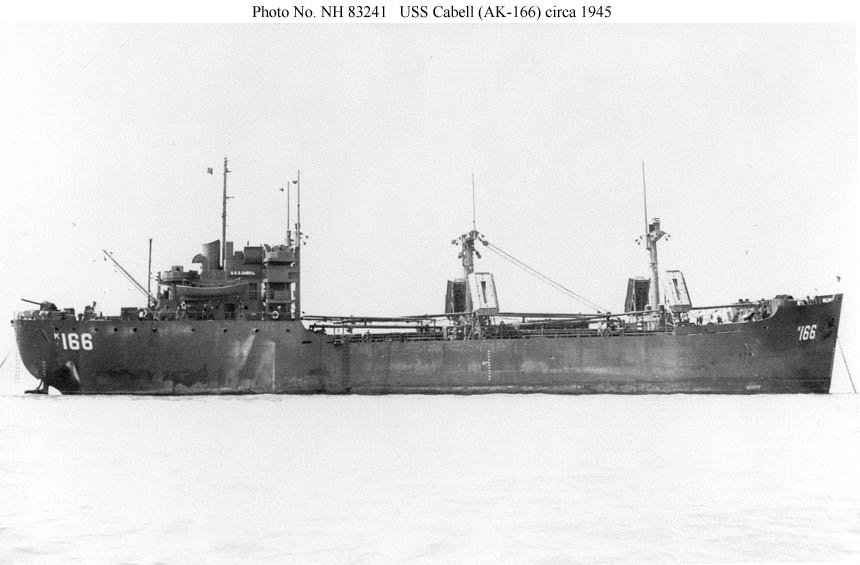
- USS Cabell (AK-166) at anchor, location unknown, c. late 1945.

History

United States
- Name: Cabell
- Namesake: Cabell County, West Virginia
- Ordered: as type (C1-M-AV1) hull, MC hull 2111
- Builder: Kaiser Shipbuilding Co., Richmond, California
- Yard number: 68
- Laid down: date unknown
- Launched: 23 December 1944
- Sponsored by: Mrs. W. P. Gilmore
- Acquired: 11 April 1945
- Commissioned: 11 April 1945
- Decommissioned: 19 July 1946
- Stricken: 31 July 1946
- Identification: Hull symbol: AK-166; Code letters: NEGI
- Fate: Sold to Swedish Rederlaktiebolaget Bris, 28 May 1947

Sweden
- Name: Sommen
- Namesake: Sommen Lake
- Owner: Rederlaktiebolaget Bris
- Acquired: 28 May 1947
- Fate: Sold 1963

Greece
- Name: Donald
- Acquired: 1963
- Fate: October 1963, posted as missing in the Gulf of Aden

General characteristics
- Class & type: Alamosa-class cargo ship
- Type: C1-M-AV1
- Tonnage: 5,032 long tons deadweight (DWT)
- Displacement: 2,382 long tons (2,420 t) (standard); 7,450 long tons (7,570 t) (full load)
- Length: 388 ft 8 in (118.47 m)
- Beam: 50 ft (15 m)
- Draft: 21 ft 1 in (6.43 m)
- Installed power: 1 × Nordberg, TSM 6 diesel engine; 1,750 shp (1,300 kW)
- Propulsion: 1 × propeller
- Speed: 11.5 kn (21.3 km/h; 13.2 mph)
- Capacity: 3,945 t (3,883 long tons) DWT; 9,830 cu ft (278 m^{3}) (refrigerated); 227,730 cu ft (6,449 m^{3}) (non-refrigerated)
- Complement: 15 Officers; 70 Enlisted
- Armament: 1 × 3 in (76 mm)/50 caliber dual purpose gun (DP); 6 × 20 mm (0.8 in) Oerlikon anti-aircraft (AA) cannons

USS Cabell (AK-166) was an Alamosa-class cargo ship commissioned by the US Navy for service in World War II. She was responsible for delivering troops, goods and equipment to locations in the war zone.

== Construction ==
Cabell was launched 23 December 1944, by Kaiser Cargo Co., Richmond, California, under a Maritime Commission contract, MC hull 2111; sponsored by Mrs. W. P. Gilmore; acquired by the Navy 11 April 1945; commissioned the same day, and reported to the U.S. Pacific Fleet.

=== World War II Pacific Theatre operations ===
Cabell made one cargo voyage from San Francisco, California, to Eniwetok and San Pedro Bay, Philippine Islands, between 1 June 1945 and 22 August. She sailed from San Francisco again 8 September with cargo for Eniwetok and Yokosuka Naval Base in Tokyo Bay, where she arrived 7 October.

Continuing with support of occupation operations, Cabell called at ports in the Philippines, and on Okinawa, Saipan, and Guam, before arriving at San Pedro, California, 15 April 1946.

=== Post-war decommissioning ===
Cabell was decommissioned at Seattle, Washington, 19 July 1946, and returned to the Maritime Commission 3 days later. The ship was sold to a Swedish firm and reflagged 1947.

== Merchant service ==
Cabell was sold to the Swedish shipping firm of Rederlaktiebolaget Bris, 28 May 1947, after they refused her sister ship Amador. She was renamed Sommen after the lake Sommen in Sweden.

In 1963, Sommen was reflagged again as the Greek ship MV Donald. She disappeared, however, later that year, with 26 people and a 5,000 t (4,900 long tons; 5,500 short tons) cargo of iron bound for Indonesia. The ship had last been heard from on 25 August 1963, when the captain sent word that the ship had encountered rough seas in the Indian Ocean.

== See also ==
- List of missing ships

== Bibliography ==
=== Newspaper resources ===
- "Ship Missing, 26 Aboard". Pittsburgh Post-Gazette. Pittsburgh, Pennsylvania. 25 September 1963.

=== Online resources ===
- "Cabell". Dictionary of American Naval Fighting Ships. Naval History and Heritage Command.
- "C1 Cargo Ships". www.ShipbuildingHistory.com. 28 August 2009.
- "USS Cabell (AK-166)". NavSource. 18 July 2014.
