= Lake Tyrrell =

Lake in Victoria, Australia

- Location in Victoria
- Location: Mallee district, Victoria
- Coordinates: 35°20′38″S 142°50′00″E
- Type: Intermittent
- Primary inflows: Tyrrell Creek
- Basin countries: Australia
- Surface area: 20,860 ha (51,500 acres)

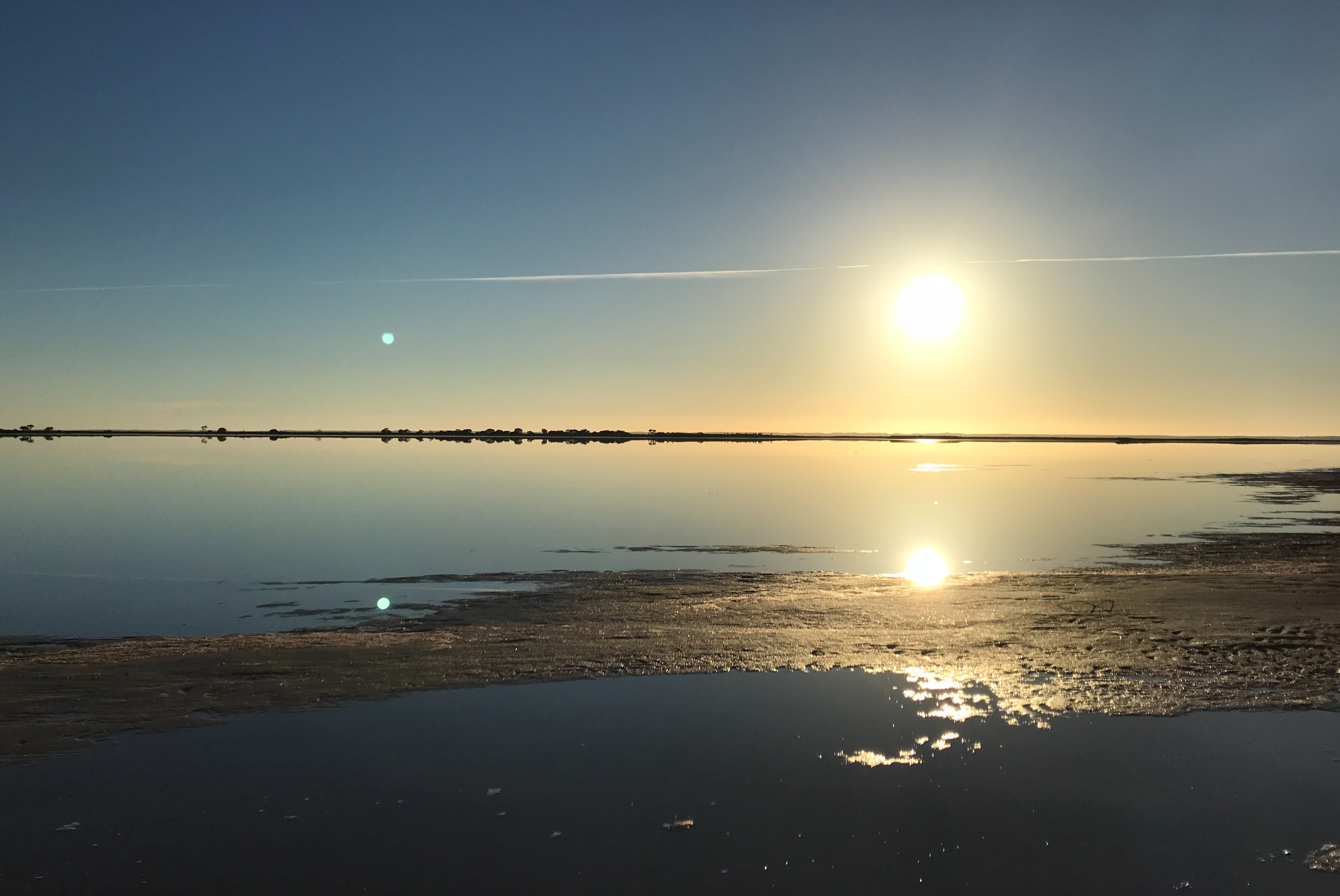
Lake Tyrrell is popular with photographers because of its mirror-like surface

Lake Tyrrell (also known as Lake Tyrrell Wildlife Reserve) is a shallow, salt-crusted depression in the Mallee district of north-west Victoria, in Australia. The name 'Tyrrell' is derived from the local Wergaia word for 'sky', the Boorong Aboriginal people of the area being distinguished for their interest in star-lore. The Boorong, with their astronomical traditions, told stories connected with constellations in the night sky.

In the mid-2010s, the lake became a tourist mecca, particularly for Chinese. It is a popular location for photographers and social media users, who take photographs of the lake's mirror-like surface during winter, when ground water percolates to the surface and inflows arrive from the Avoca River/Tyrrell Creek system.

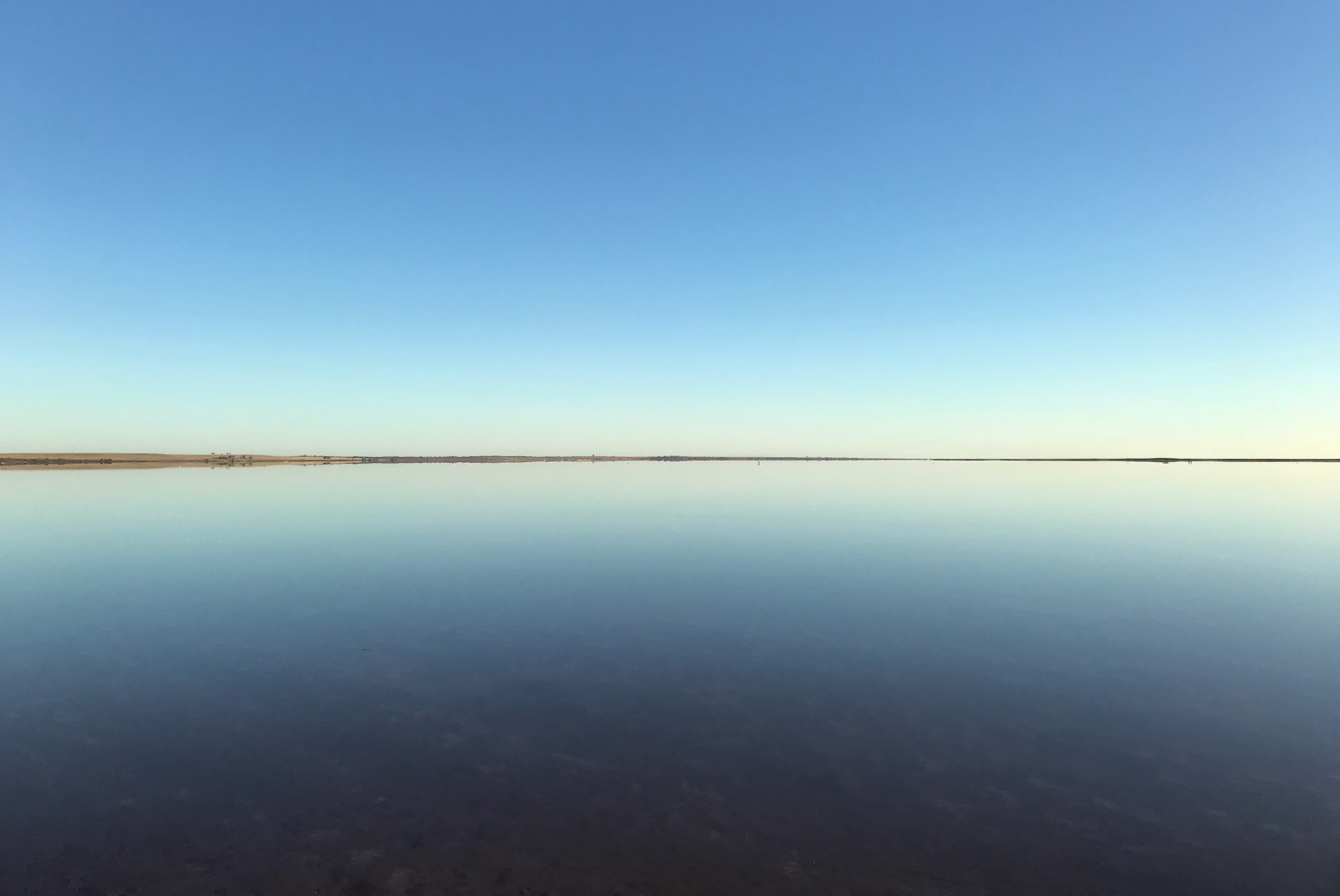
Lake Tyrrell's mirror-like surface

During dry periods, people can walk on to the lake area by using places where salt has formed a solid surface.

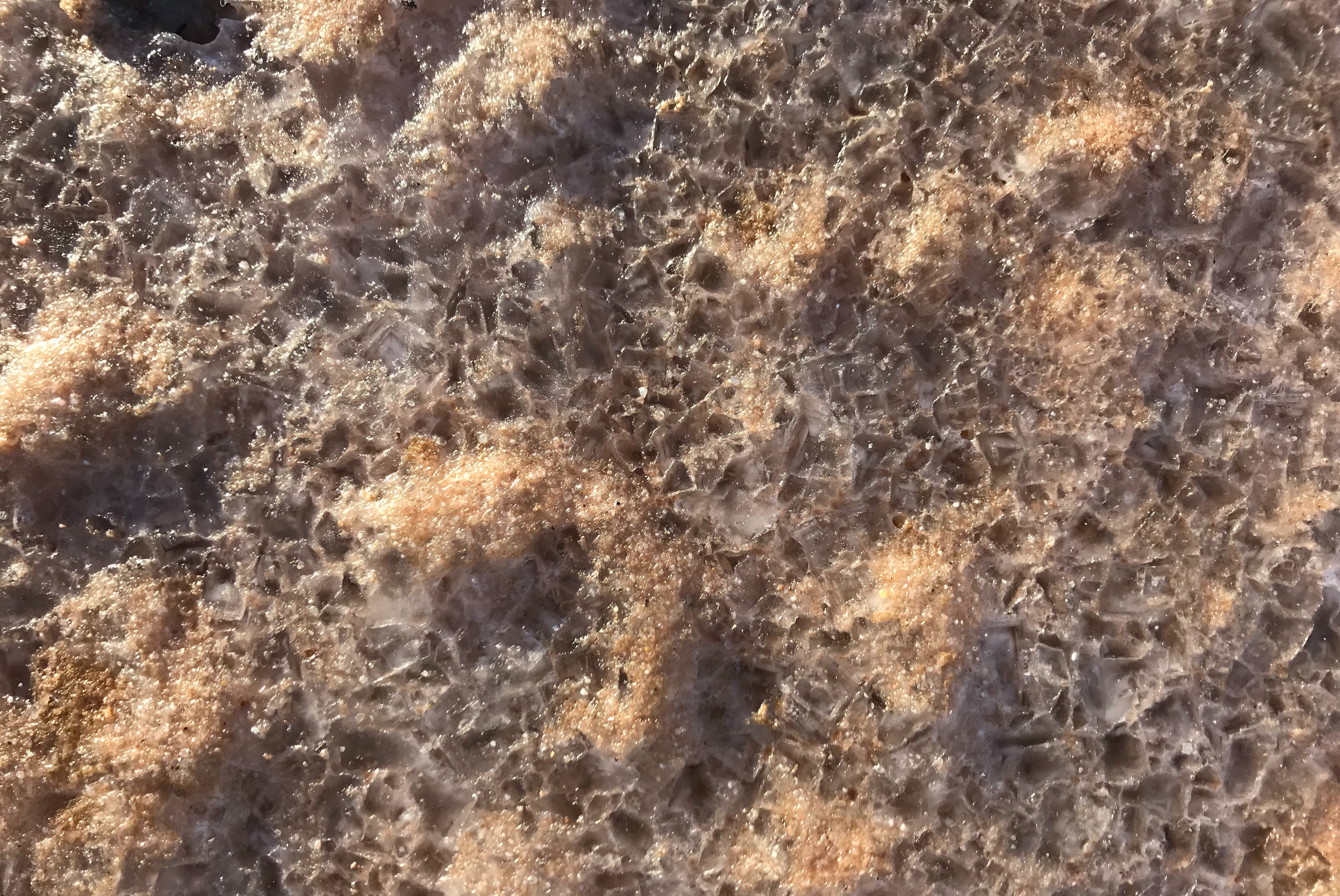
Lake Tyrrell's solid salt floor

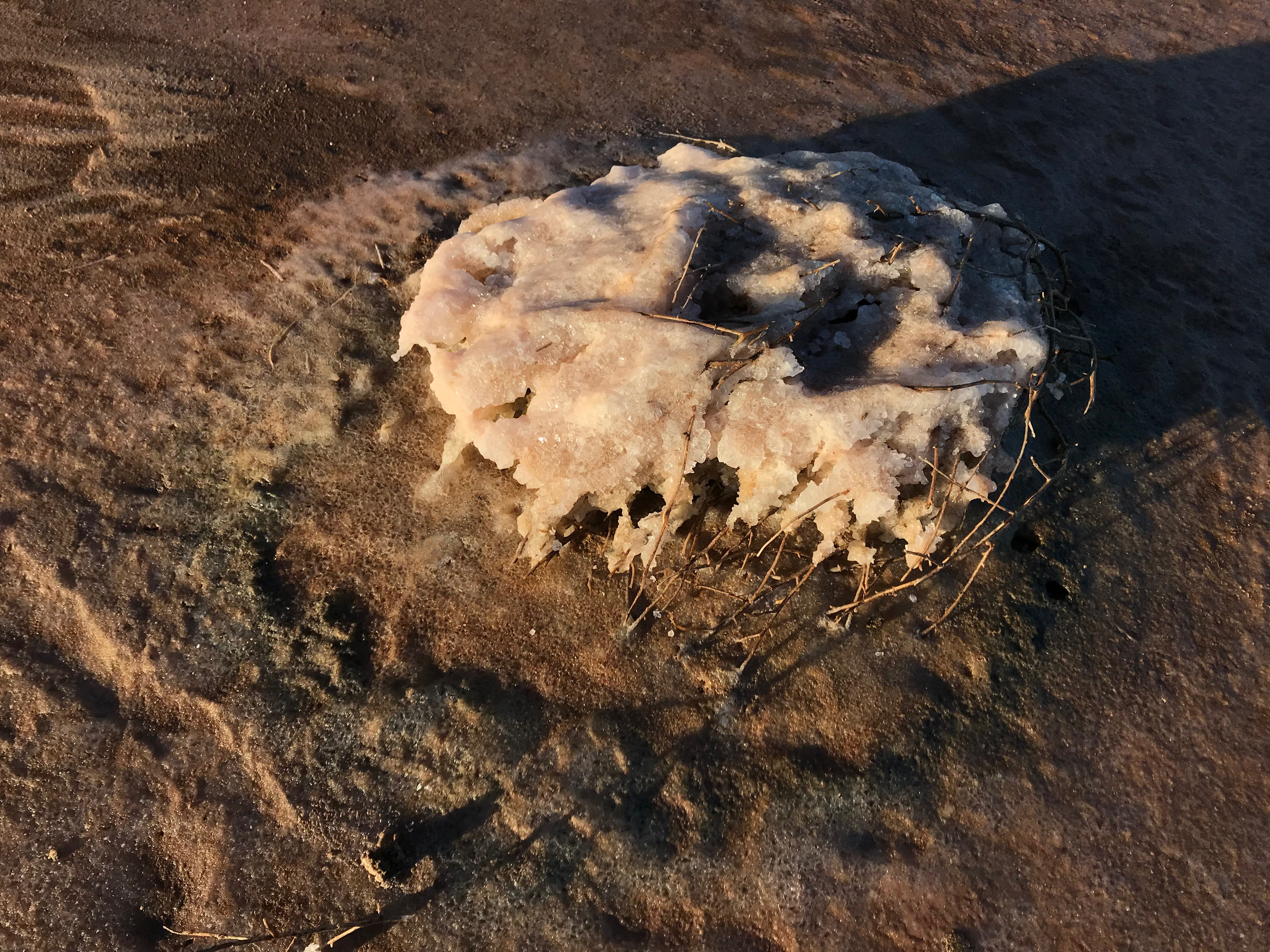
Salt crust

== Location and features ==
The lake covers approximately 20,860 hectares (51,500 acres), making it Victoria's largest salt lake. It is located 6 kilometres (3.7 mi) north of the town of Sea Lake and 314 kilometres (195 mi) northwest of Melbourne.

While much of the time the lake is dry, it is usually covered in about 5 centimetres (2 in) of water in winter. It is ancient, and probably formed by sand blocking the passage of Tyrrell Creek, a distributary of the Avoca River, which feeds the lake. Evaporation results in a layer of salt crusting on the lake bed, which is harvested by Cheetham Salt in Sea Lake.

The lake environment is host to Mallee reptiles, kangaroos, emus, and the white-fronted chat, an insectivorous bird. Thousands of seagulls breed on small islands on the lake. Surrounding vegetation is made up of saltbush and samphire, which supports a range of wildlife. To the east, the lunette contains significant Aboriginal relics.

== History ==
Around 120,000 years ago, Tyrrell was approximately 13 metres (43 ft) deep with low salinity. Water levels subsequently dropped due to climatic changes, resulting in cycles of drying and partial refilling.

In 1838, the explorer Edward Eyre was the first European to document Lake Tyrrell, while searching for new grazing land.

== Recreation activities ==
Each year, on the King's Birthday long weekend, the lake hosts the Mallee Rally, once part of the Australian Off Road Championship and, more recently, Australian Off Road Racing Series.

On the Sea Lake side of the lake, 7–8 kilometres (4.3–5.0 mi) from the township, is a lookout and astronomy deck, built in the late 1990s.
