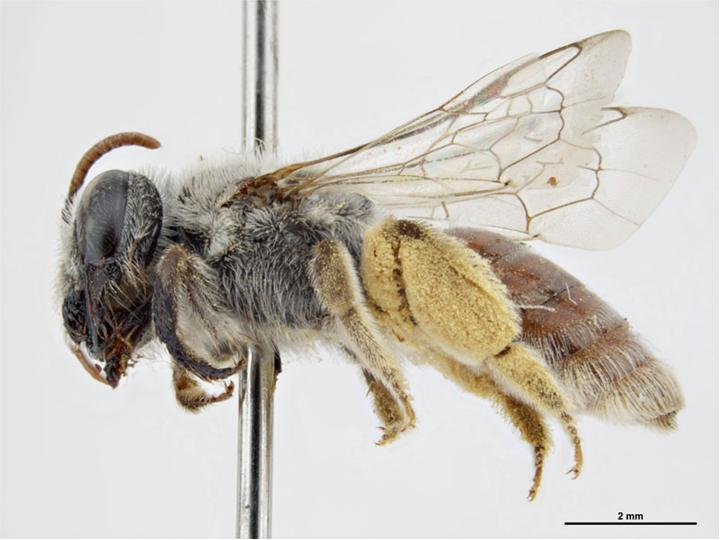
- Female

Scientific classification
- Kingdom: Animalia
- Phylum: Arthropoda
- Clade: Pancrustacea
- Class: Insecta
- Order: Hymenoptera
- Family: Colletidae
- Genus: Leioproctus
- Species: L. fimbriatus

Binomial name
- Leioproctus fimbriatus (Smith, 1879)

Synonyms
- Paracolletes clarus Rayment, 1935

= Leioproctus fimbriatus =

Species of bee

Leioproctus fimbriatus, or Leioproctus (Goniocolletes) fimbriatus, is a species of bee in the family Colletidae and subfamily Colletinae. It is endemic to Australia. It was described by English entomologist Frederick Smith in 1879.

== Distribution and habitat ==
The species occurs across mainland Australia. Type localities include Sea Lake in north-western Victoria.

== Behaviour ==
The adults are flying mellivores.

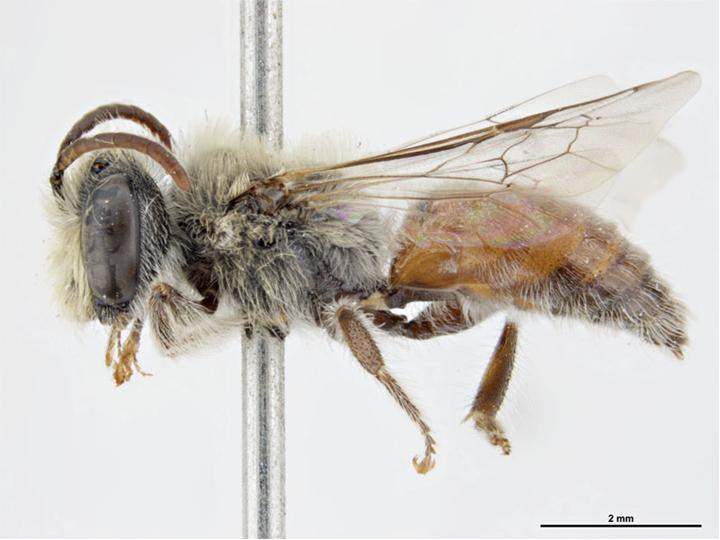
Male
