= Greg Daniels (footballer) =

Australian rules footballer

Personal information
- Full name: Greg Daniels
- Born: 27 August 1963 (age 63)
- Original team: Sea Lake

Playing career^{1}
Years	Club	Games (Goals)
1986	Collingwood	5 (5)
- ^{1} Playing statistics correct to the end of 1986.

Greg Daniels (born 27 August 1963) is a former Australian rules footballer who played for Collingwood in the Victorian Football League (VFL) in 1986. He was recruited from Sea Lake.
