= Umbrella =

Canopy designed to protect against rain or sunlight

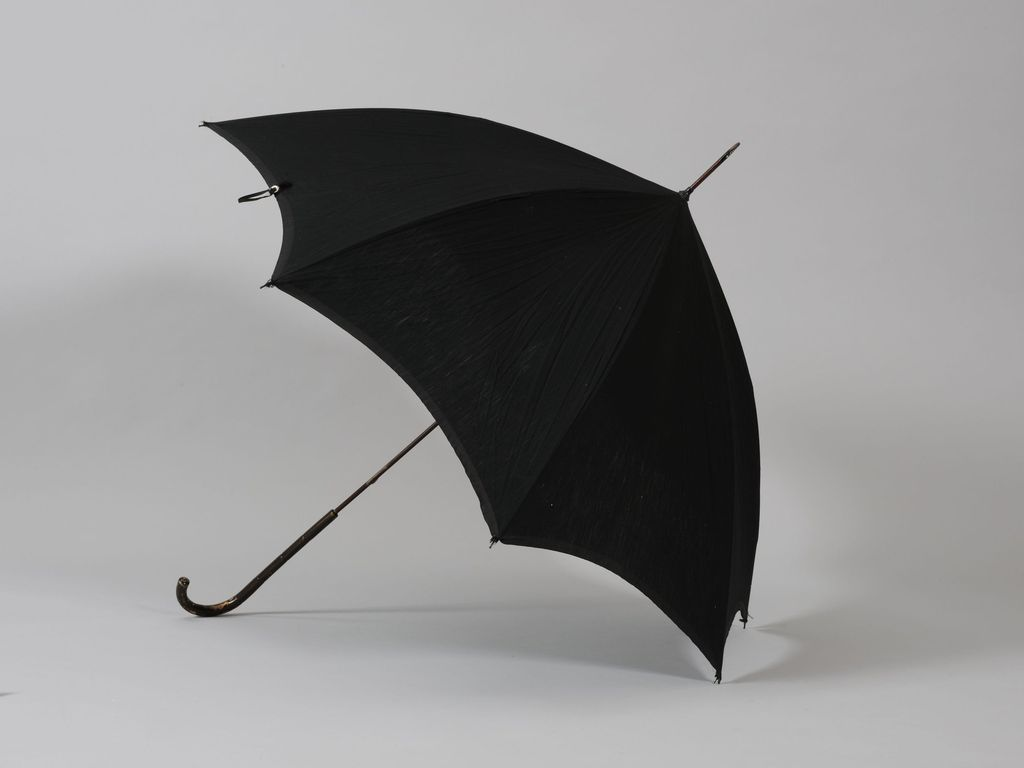
An umbrella

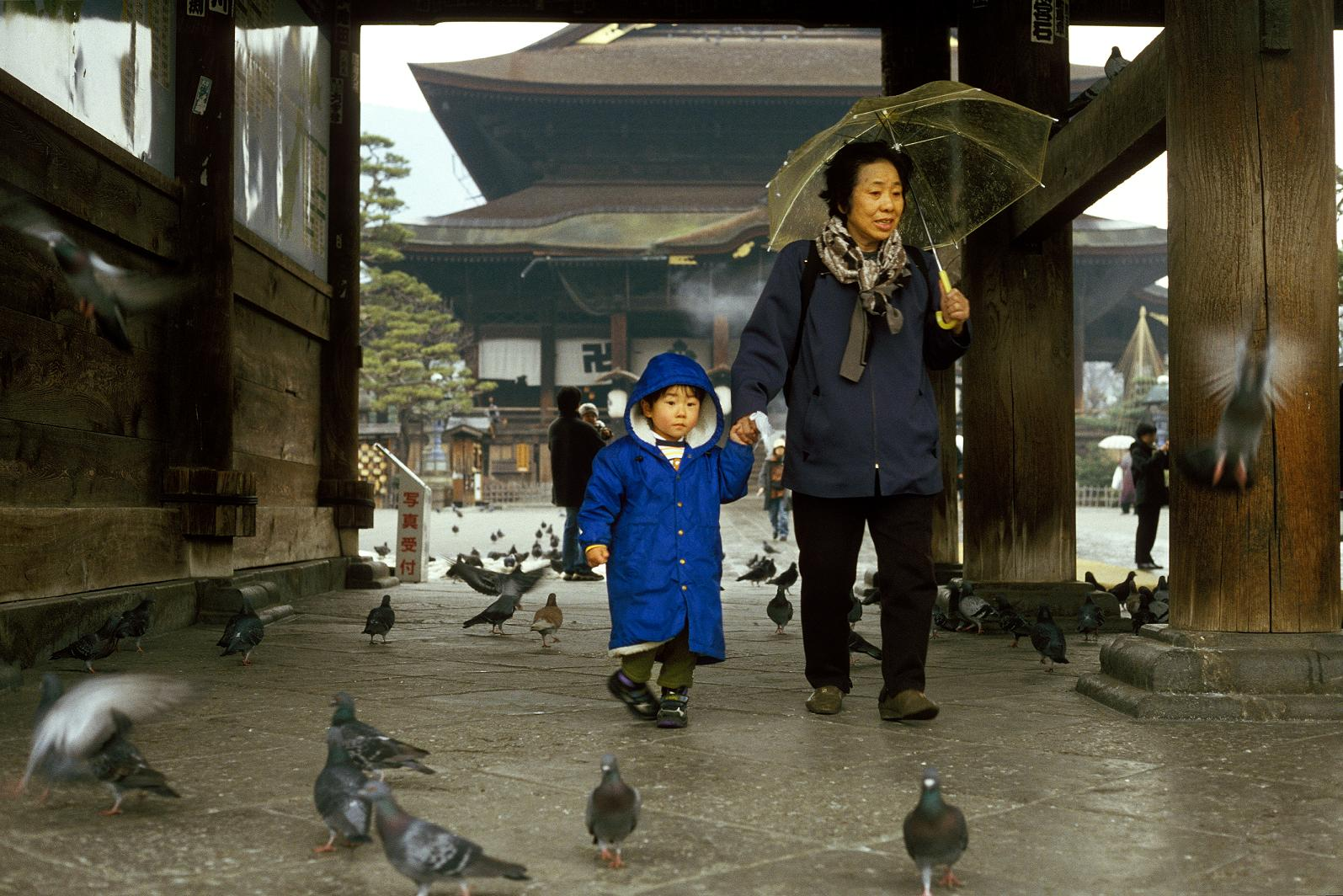
Woman holding a parapluie at Zenkō-ji, Nagano, Japan

An umbrella (parasol or rarely parapluie) is a folding canopy supported by wooden or metal ribs that is mounted on a wooden, metal, or plastic pole. It is usually designed to protect a person against sun or rain. Initially, (in the early 1200s) they were used in warmer countries for shade from the sun, but later evolved to also be used for protection from rain. Etymologically, the term umbrella is to be used when protecting from the sun, but is also commonly used when protecting from rain. Some countries specifically use the words parasol and parapluie to differentiate based on their use. There are also combinations of parasol and parapluie that are called en-tout-cas (French for "in any case"). A modern hand-held umbrella or parasol may have a black exterior canopy and a silver inner coating, for better protection from both the sun and ultraviolet rays, and may be water-resistant.

In general, umbrellas are small, handheld, personal use items. There are two main types of umbrellas: completely collapsible umbrellas, which can be folded up into a small package because of the supporting metal pole's ability to retract, and non-collapsible umbrellas, where only the canopy can be folded up. Handheld umbrellas have a type of handle which can be made from wood or plastic in a bent "crook" handle (like the handle of a cane). Umbrellas are available in a range of price and quality points, ranging from inexpensive, modest quality models sold at discount stores to expensive, finely made, designer-labeled models. Manually operated umbrellas and spring-loaded automatic umbrellas, which open with a button press, can also be distinguished from one another. Larger parasols capable of blocking the sun for several people are often used as fixed or semi-fixed devices, used with patio tables or other outdoor furniture, or as points of shade on a sunny beach.

== Etymology ==
Parts of an umbrella

The word umbrella evolved from the Latin umbra, meaning 'shadow' or 'shade from light' as it provided a shade from the sun. The Oxford English Dictionary records the first recorded usage in this sense in 1611.

The word parasol is a combination of the Latin parare (to 'parry', 'ward off', 'shield') and sol ('sun'). The mostly nineteenth century Parapluie, from French, also combines para with pluie ('rain'), in turn derived from Latin pluvia. Again, French Paraneige is a combination of para with neige ('snow'), also from Latin nix. Hence, a parasol shields from sunlight, a parapluie shields from rain, and a paraneige shields from snow.

In Britain, umbrellas were sometimes referred to as "gamps" after the character Mrs. Gamp in Charles Dickens' novel Martin Chuzzlewit as the character was well known for carrying an umbrella, although this usage is now dated or obsolete.

In India the word छात्र (chhatra) has been used since ancient times. It represents, that which gives छाया (chhaya), meaning shade or shadow from the Sun.

Brolly is a slang shortening of umbrella, often found in Australia, Ireland, Kenya, New Zealand, South Africa, and the UK.

Bumbershoot is a rare and fanciful Americanism from the late 19th century.

An umbrella may also be called a sunshade, rainshade, snowshade, or beach umbrella (US English).

== History ==
=== Africa ===
==== Ancient Egypt ====
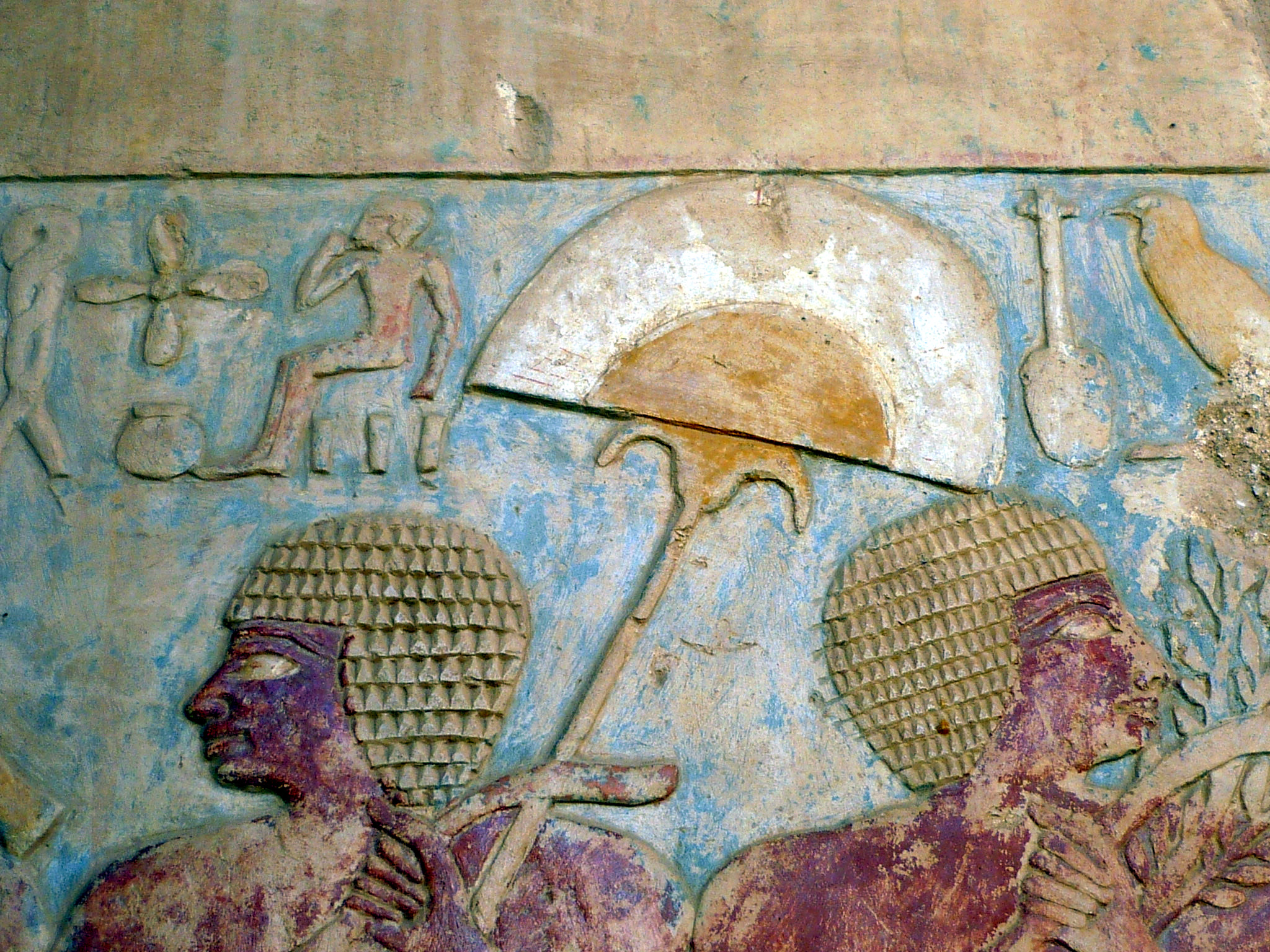
Relief of an Egyptian umbrella. These were used as sunshade and fan alike (flabellum).

The earliest known umbrellas in Ancient Egyptian art date back to the Fifth Dynasty, around 2450 BC. The umbrella is found in various shapes. Typically it is depicted as a flabellum, a fan of palm-leaves or coloured feathers fixed on a long handle, resembling those now carried behind the Pope in processions. Gardiner Wilkinson, in his work on Egypt, has an engraving of an Ethiopian princess travelling through Upper Egypt in a chariot; a kind of umbrella fastened to a stout pole rises in the centre, bearing a close affinity to what are now termed chaise umbrellas. According to Wilkinson's account, the umbrella was generally used throughout Egypt, partly as a mark of distinction, but more on account of its useful than its ornamental qualities. In some paintings on a temple wall, a parasol is held over the figure of a god carried in procession.

==== Ashanti Empire ====
Zeinab Badawi in An African History of Africa: From the Dawn of Humanity to Independence states the umbrella was introduced by the Dutch to the Ashanti, when Osei Kofi Tutu I received one as a gift following his defeat of the other Akan kingdoms. Later, in 1707, Sir Dalby Thomas asked the British to supply the Asante with umbrellas. By the 1800s, the Amanhene (senior chiefs) were using large multicolored umbrellas. Umbrellas were used during festivals as streets of Kumasi were paraded with them. Like the Asantehene's umbrella bearer, the others also spin their umbrellas in tune with the music produced by drummers while accompanying their "Ohene". Umbrellas were also used to provide coolness as well as highlight the importance of the various leaders.

=== Americas ===
==== Mesoamerica ====
The district of the Aztec capital Tenochtitlan was reported to have used an umbrella made from feathers and gold as its pantli, an identifying marker that is the equivalent of a modern flag. The pantli was carried by the army general.

==== United States ====
Beehler Umbrella Factory est. 1828 was the first umbrella manufacturing company in the United States. Francis Beehler was a woodcarver in his home country of Germany. After he immigrated to Baltimore, Maryland, he noticed a lack of umbrellas. Americans generally scorned the devices for their "ridiculous effeminacy". Nevertheless he used his talents in making wooden poles and whale bone ribbed umbrellas to create a new market (steel rib designs would not appear until after 1852). Beehler's success attracted competitors. Baltimore was long recognized as the umbrella capital of the country; at the industry's peak in 1920 there were seven umbrella companies in the city producing millions of umbrellas annually.

=== Asia ===
==== Ancient Near East ====
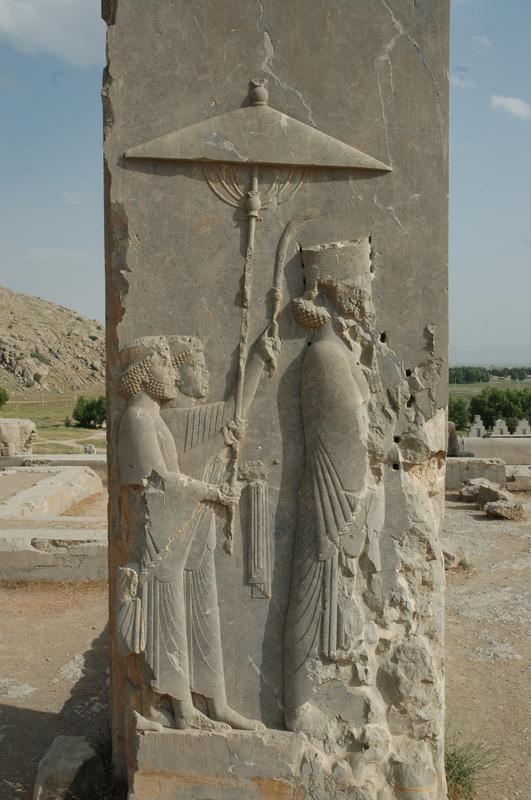
Bas-relief of the Persian king Xerxes I (485–465 BC) at Persepolis

The oldest extant example of an umbrella appears in the archaeological record around 2310 BC, in a victory stele of Sargon of Akkad. In later sculptures at Nineveh, the umbrella appears frequently. Austen Henry Layard gives a picture of a bas-relief representing a king in his chariot, with an attendant holding an umbrella over his head, dating from c. 710 BC. It has a curtain hanging down behind, but is otherwise exactly like those in use today. It is reserved exclusively for the monarch (who was bald), and is never carried over any other person.

In Persia, the umbrella is repeatedly found in the carved work of Persepolis, and Sir John Malcolm has an article on the subject in his 1815 "History of Persia". In some sculptures, the figure of a king appears attended by a servant, who carries over his head an umbrella, complete with stretchers and runner. In other sculptures on the rock at Taghe-Bostan, supposed to be not less than twelve centuries old, a deer-hunt is represented, at which a king looks on, seated on a horse, and having an umbrella borne over his head by an attendant.

==== China ====
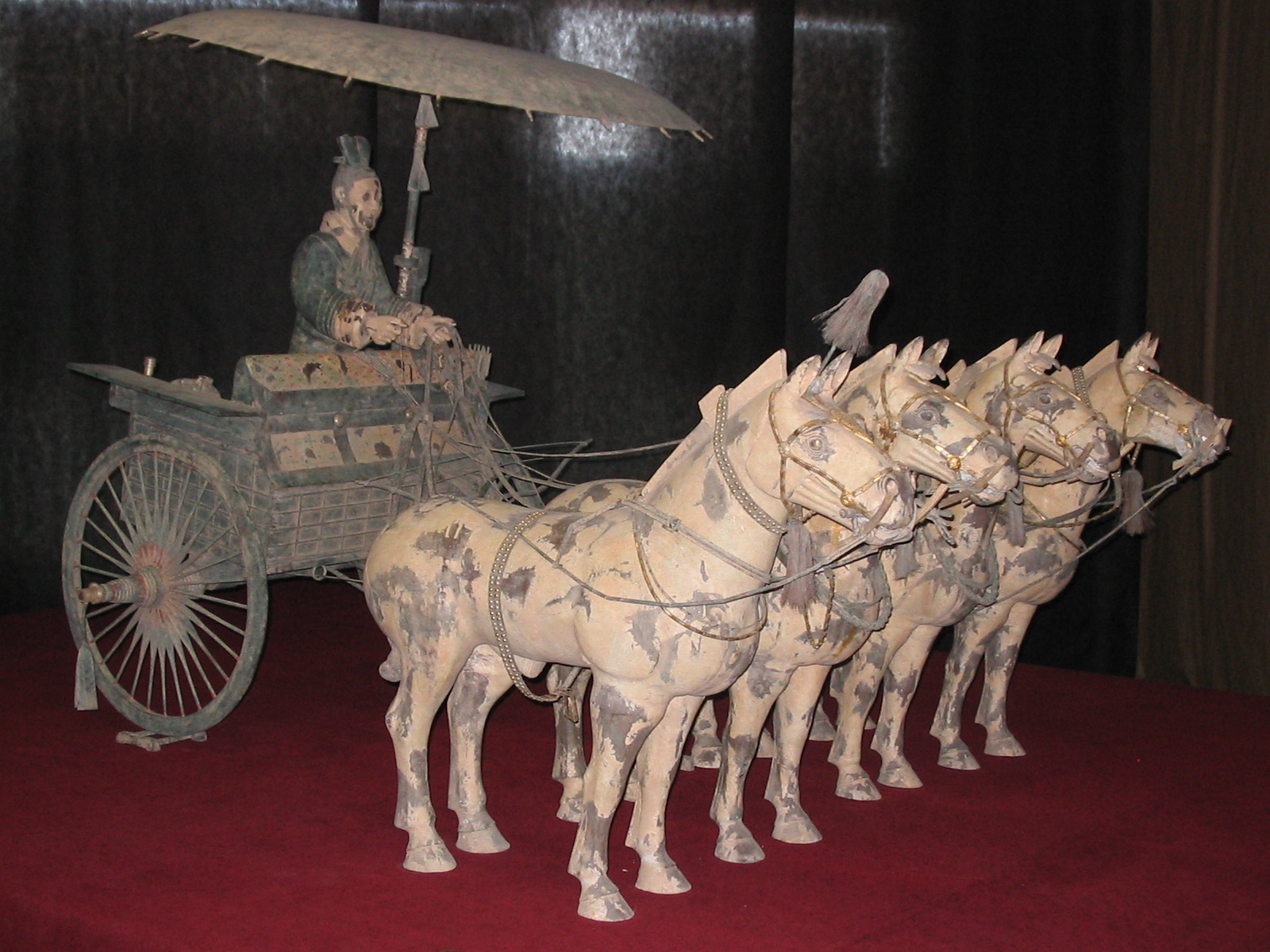
A Terracotta Army carriage with an umbrella securely fixed to the side, from Qin Shihuang's tomb, c. 210 BC

The creation of the umbrella is attributed to the wife of Lu Ban, who invented it during the Warring State Period. Some investigators have supposed that its invention was first created by tying large leaves to bough-like ribs (the branching out parts of an umbrella). Others assert that the idea was probably derived from the tent, which remains in an unaltered form to the present day. However, the tradition existing in China is that it originated in standards and banners waving in the air, hence the use of the umbrella was often linked to high-ranking (though not necessarily royalty) in China. The use of umbrella as a social marker indicating and classifying the identities and social class of its users started by the post-Wei period and continued up to the Ming dynasty. On at least one occasion, twenty-four umbrellas were carried before the emperor when he went out hunting. The umbrella served in this case as a defence against rain rather than sun. The Chinese and Japanese traditional parasol, often used near temples, remains similar to the original ancient Chinese design.

The ancient book of Chinese ceremonies, called Zhou Li (The Rites of Zhou), dating some 2,400 years ago, directs that a dais should be placed upon the imperial cars. The figure of this dais contained in Zhou Li, and the description of it given in the explanatory commentary of Lin-hi-ye, both identify it with an umbrella. The latter describes the dais to be composed of 28 arcs, which are equivalent to the ribs of the modern instrument, and the staff supporting the covering to consist of two parts, the upper being a rod 3/18 of a Chinese foot in circumference, and the lower a tube 6/10 in circumference, into which the upper half is capable of sliding and closing.

The Book of Han contains a reference to a collapsible umbrella, mentioning its usage in the year 21 AD when Wang Mang (r. 9–23) had one designed for a ceremonial four-wheeled carriage. The 2nd-century commentator Fu Qian added that this collapsible umbrella of Wang Mang's carriage had bendable joints which enabled them to be extended or retracted. A 1st century collapsible umbrella has since been recovered from the tomb of Wang Guang at Lelang Commandery in the Korean Peninsula. The Chinese collapsible umbrella may predate Wang's tomb, however. Zhou dynasty bronze castings of complex bronze socketed hinges with locking slides and bolts—which could have been used for parasols and umbrellas—were found in an archaeological site of Luoyang, dated to the 6th century BC.

A late Song dynasty Chinese divination book, Book of Physiognomical, Astrological and Ornithomantic Divination according to the Three Schools (演禽斗數三世相書) by Yuan Tianwang (袁天網), that was printed in about 1270 AD features a picture of a collapsible umbrella that is exactly like the modern umbrella of today's China.

The oil-paper umbrella also originated in China and was spread among the common people after the Eastern Han dynasty. It started to be introduced in other countries in the Tang dynasty and eventually spread across several East, South and Southeast Asian countries such as Japan, Malaysia, Myanmar, Bangladesh, India, Sri Lanka, Thailand, Laos and Vietnam, where it has been further developed with different characteristics.

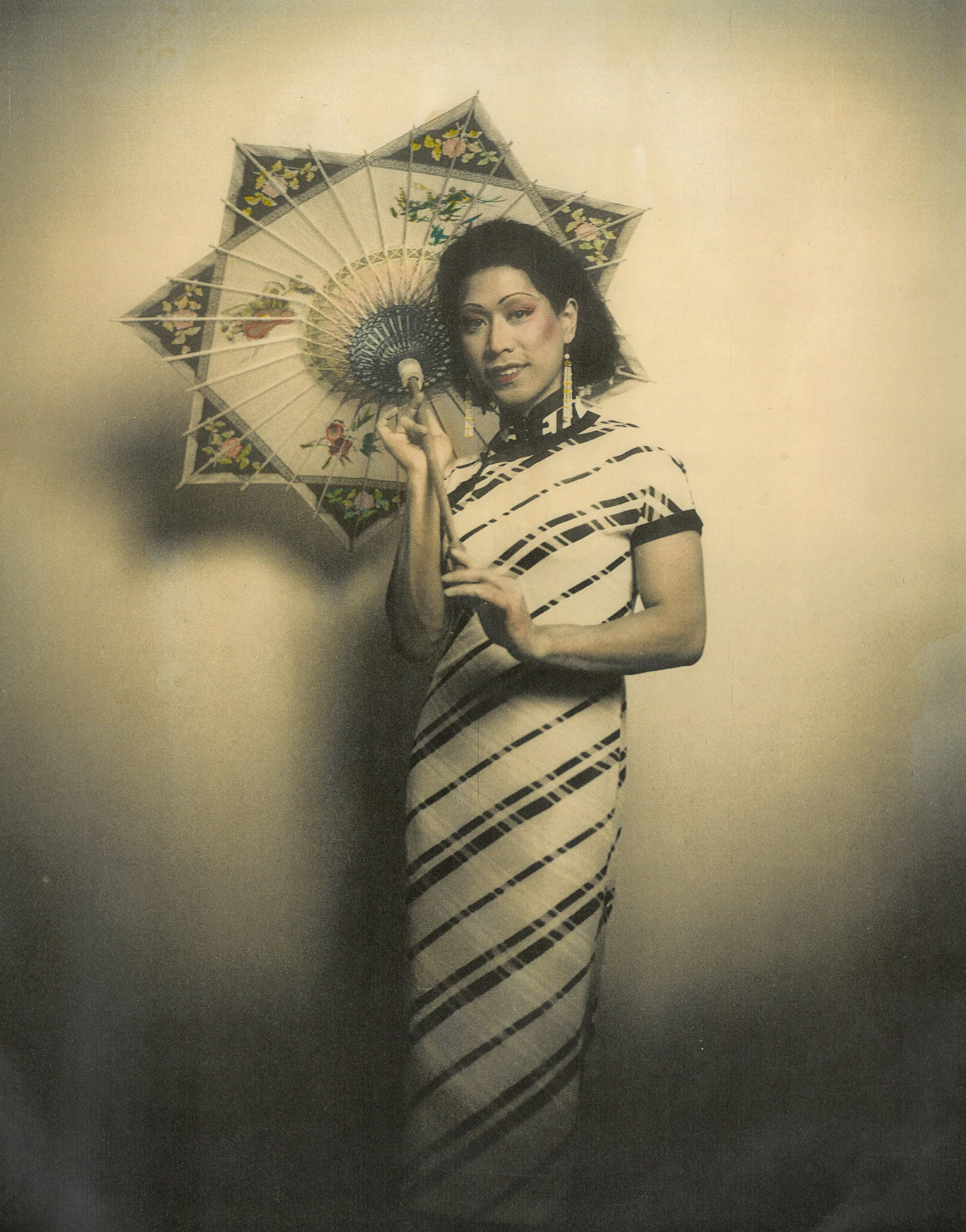
Hand-coloured photo of a woman in Shanghai wearing a qipao and holding an octagon shape umbrella, c. 1930s

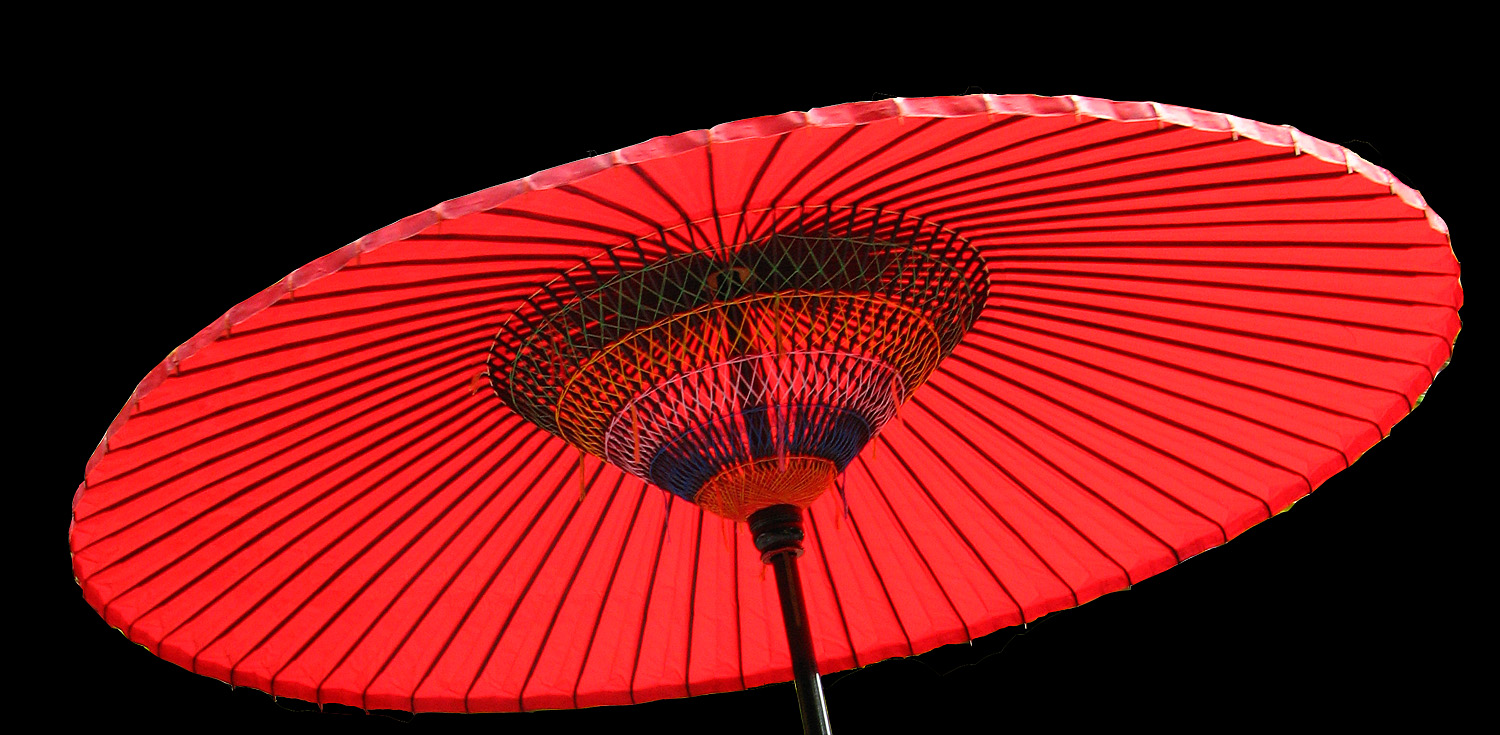
A Japanese oil-paper parasol for Japanese tea ceremony in Kyoto

==== Ancient India ====
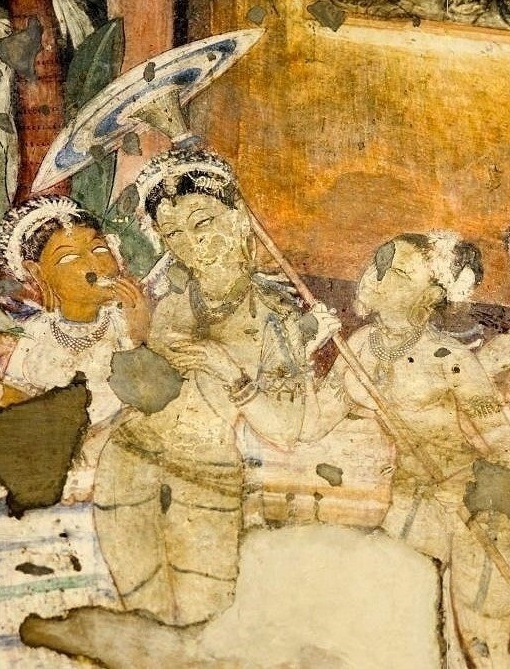
Woman holding an umbrella Gupta Empire AD 320

The Sanskrit epic Mahabharata relates the following legend: Jamadagni was a skilled bow shooter, and his devoted wife Renuka would always recover each of his arrows immediately. One time however, it took her a whole day to fetch the arrow, and she later blamed the heat of the sun for the delay. The angry Jamadagni shot an arrow at the sun. The sun begged for mercy and offered Renuka a "chatra" (umbrella).

Jean Baptiste Tavernier, in his 17th century book "Voyage to the East", says that on each side of the Mogul's throne were two umbrellas, and also describes the hall of the King of Ava was decorated with an umbrella. The chháta of the Indian and Burmese princes is large and heavy, and requires a special attendant, who has a regular position in the royal household. In Ava it seems to have been part of the king's title, that he was "King of the white elephant, and Lord of the twenty-four umbrellas".

==== Southeast Asia ====
Simon de la Loubère, who was Envoy Extraordinary from the French King to the King of Siam in 1687 and 1688, wrote an account entitled a "New Historical Relation of the Kingdom of Siam", which was translated in 1693 into English. According to his account, the use of the umbrella was granted to only some of the subjects by the king. An umbrella with several circles, as if two or three umbrellas were fastened on the same stick, was permitted to the king alone; the nobles carried a single umbrella with painted cloths hanging from it. The Talapoins (who seem to have been a sort of Siamese monks) had umbrellas made of a palm-leaf cut and folded, so that the stem formed a handle.

In 1855 the King of Burma directed a letter to the Marquis of Dalhousie in which he styles himself "His great, glorious, and most excellent Majesty, who reigns over the kingdoms of Thunaparanta, Tampadipa, and all the great umbrella-wearing chiefs of the Eastern countries".

The Royal Nine-Tiered Umbrella is one of the royal regalia of Thailand.

=== Europe ===
The Bronze Age Dupljaja chariot, a ceramic sculpture found in Serbia dating from c. 1300 BC (attributed to the Dubovac culture), depicts a male figure, interpreted as a solar deity, standing in a three-wheeled chariot with an attached umbrella held above him.

==== Ancient Greece ====
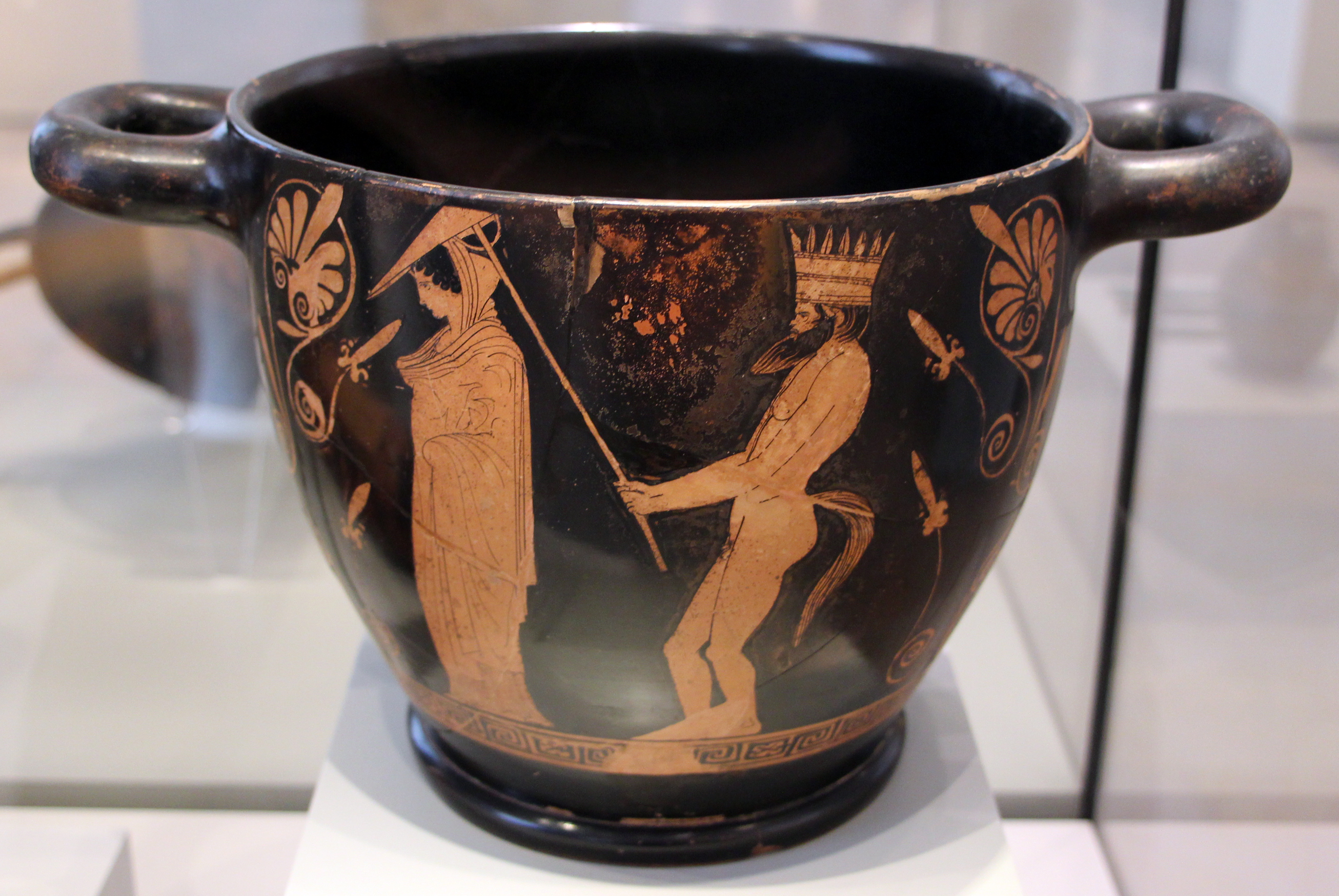
Ancient Greek pottery from c. 440 BC

Umbrellas are first attested on pottery shards from the late Mycenaean period (c. 1320–1190 BC). Ancient umbrellas could be opened and shut, but rigid examples may have also existed. The earliest archaeological evidence for a collapsible umbrella was unearthed in Samos in a context from about 700 BC and follows closely the shape of a slightly older Phrygian specimen excavated at Gordion. The sliding mechanism of the two pieces is remarkably similar to those in use today.

In Classical Greece, the umbrella (skiadeion, σκιάδειον), was an indispensable adjunct to a lady of fashion in the late 5th century BC. Aristophanes mentions it among the common articles of female use; they could apparently open and close. Pausanias describes a tomb near Triteia in Achaia decorated with a 4th-century BC painting ascribed to Nikias; it depicted the figure of a woman, "and by her stood a female slave, bearing a parasol". For a man to carry one was considered a mark of effeminacy. In Aristophanes' Birds, Prometheus uses one as a comical disguise.

Cultural changes among the Aristoi of Greece eventually led to a brief period, between 505 and 470 BC, when men used parasols. Vase iconography bears witness to a transition from men carrying swords, then spears, then staffs, then parasols, to eventually nothing. The parasol, at that time of its fashion, displayed the luxury of the user's lifestyle. During the period of their usage, Greek style was inspired by the Persian and Lydian nobility's way of dressing: loose robes, long decorated hair, gold, jewellery, and perfume.

It also had religious significance. In the Scirophoria, the feast of Athene Sciras, a white parasol was borne by the priestesses of the goddess from the Acropolis to the Phalerus. In the feasts of Dionysos, the umbrella was used, and in an old bas-relief, the same god is represented as descending ad inferos (towards the underworld) with a small umbrella in his hand. In the Panathenaea, the daughters of the Metics, or foreign residents, carried parasols over the heads of Athenian women as a mark of inferiority.

During the Panathenaea, daughters of Metics carried the parasols of the Athenian maidens; this service was called sciadephoria (σκιαδηφορία).

==== Ancient Rome ====
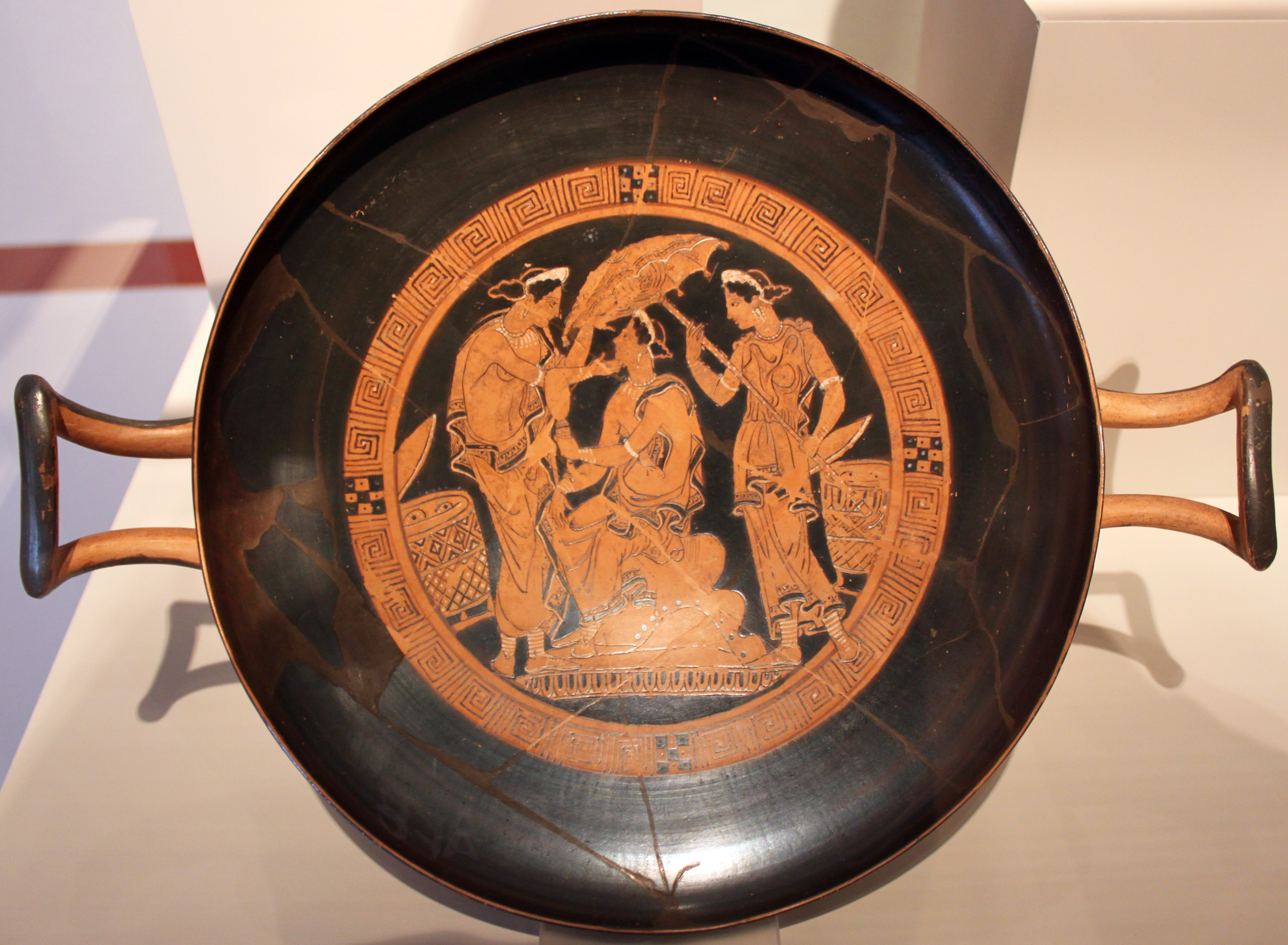
Etruscan drinking cup from Chiusi, Italy, 350–300 BC

From Greece it is probable that the use of the umbrella passed to Rome, where it seems to have been usually used by women, while it was the custom even for effeminate men to defend themselves from the heat by means of the Umbraculum, formed of skin or leather, and capable of being lowered at will. There are frequent references to the umbrella in the Roman Classics, and it appears that it was, not unlikely, a post of honour among maid-servants to bear it over their mistresses. Allusions to it are tolerably frequent in the poets. (Ovid Fast. lib. ii., 1. 31 I.; Martial, lib. xi., Ch. 73.; lib. xiv, Ch. 28, 130; Ovid Ars. Am., ii., 209). From such mentions the umbrella seems to have been employed as a defense from sun, but references to its use as a protection against rain, while rare, also exist (Juvenal, ix., 50.).

According to Gorius, the umbrella came to Rome from the Etruscans who came to Rome for protection, and certainly it appears not infrequently on Etruscan vases and pottery, as also on later gems and rubies. One gem, figured by Pacudius, shows an umbrella with a bent handle, sloping backwards. Strabo describes a sort of screen or umbrella worn by Spanish women, but this is not like a modern umbrella.

==== Middle Ages ====
By the fall of the Roman Empire, in the 5th and 6th centuries, the umbrella and parasol were largely forgotten in Europe, for the next few centuries. Beginning in the 8th century, there are numerous contemporary depictions and descriptions of umbrellas and parasols during the remainder of the Middle Ages, predominantly used in the religious ceremonies of the church. By the 8th century, the umbrella and parasol was firmly established in the church, seen as honorific and symbolic. The earliest visual record is an "8th century image of Bishop John of Pavia, showing him followed by a servant carrying an umbrella". The earliest known written evidence of the parasol is also from the 8th century, when Pope Paul I (757-767) bestowed a jeweled parasol to Pepin the Short as part of a peace settlement.

==== 16th century ====
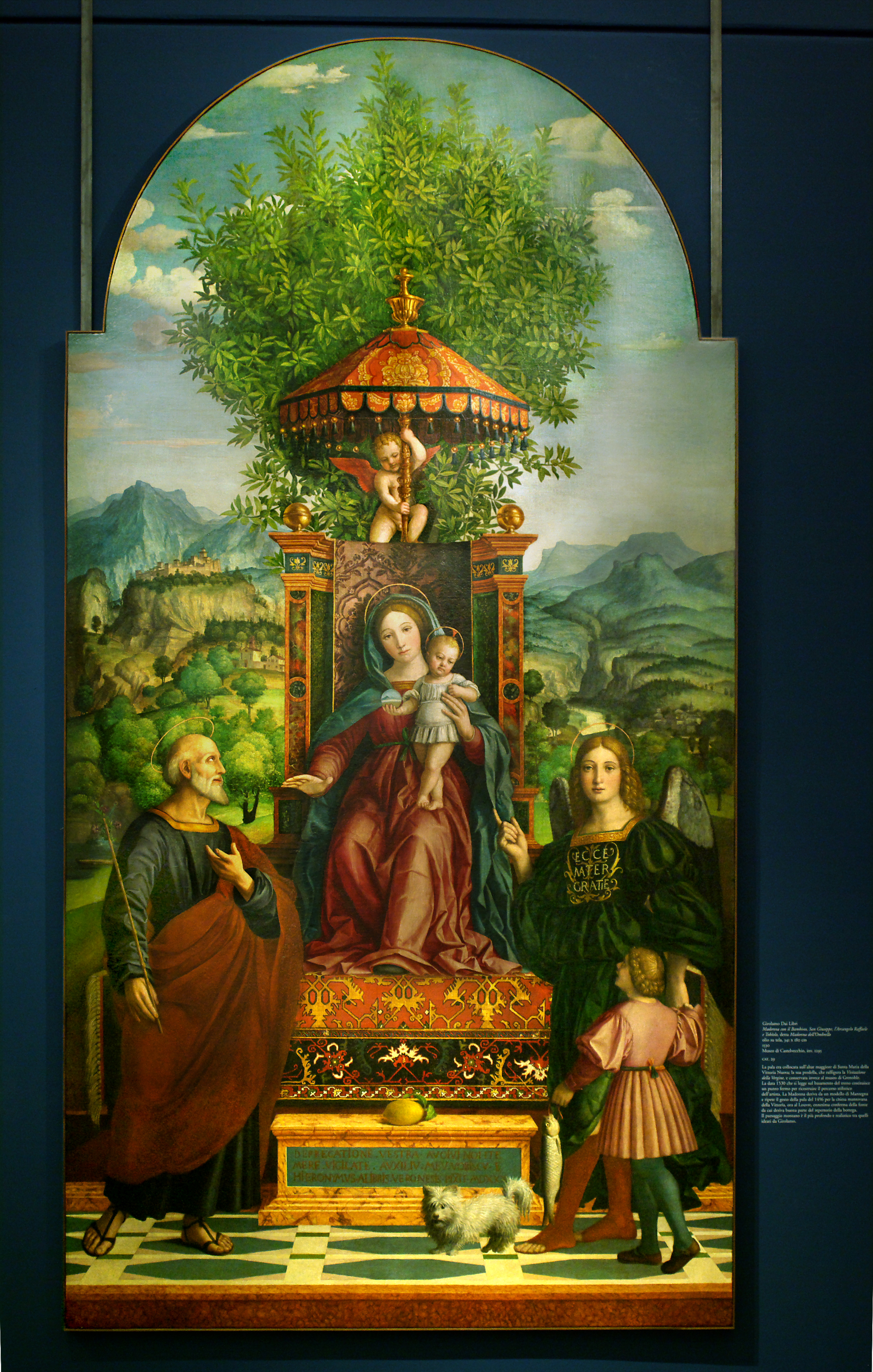
Madonna dell'Ombrello, by Girolamo dai Libri, 1530

A 1530 depiction is in Girolamo dai Libri's painting Madonna dell Ombrello ("Madonna of the Umbrella"), in which the Virgin Mary is sheltered by a cherub carrying a large, red umbrella (see image). Umbrellas were regarded as marks of distinction for the pope and clergy.

==== 17th century ====
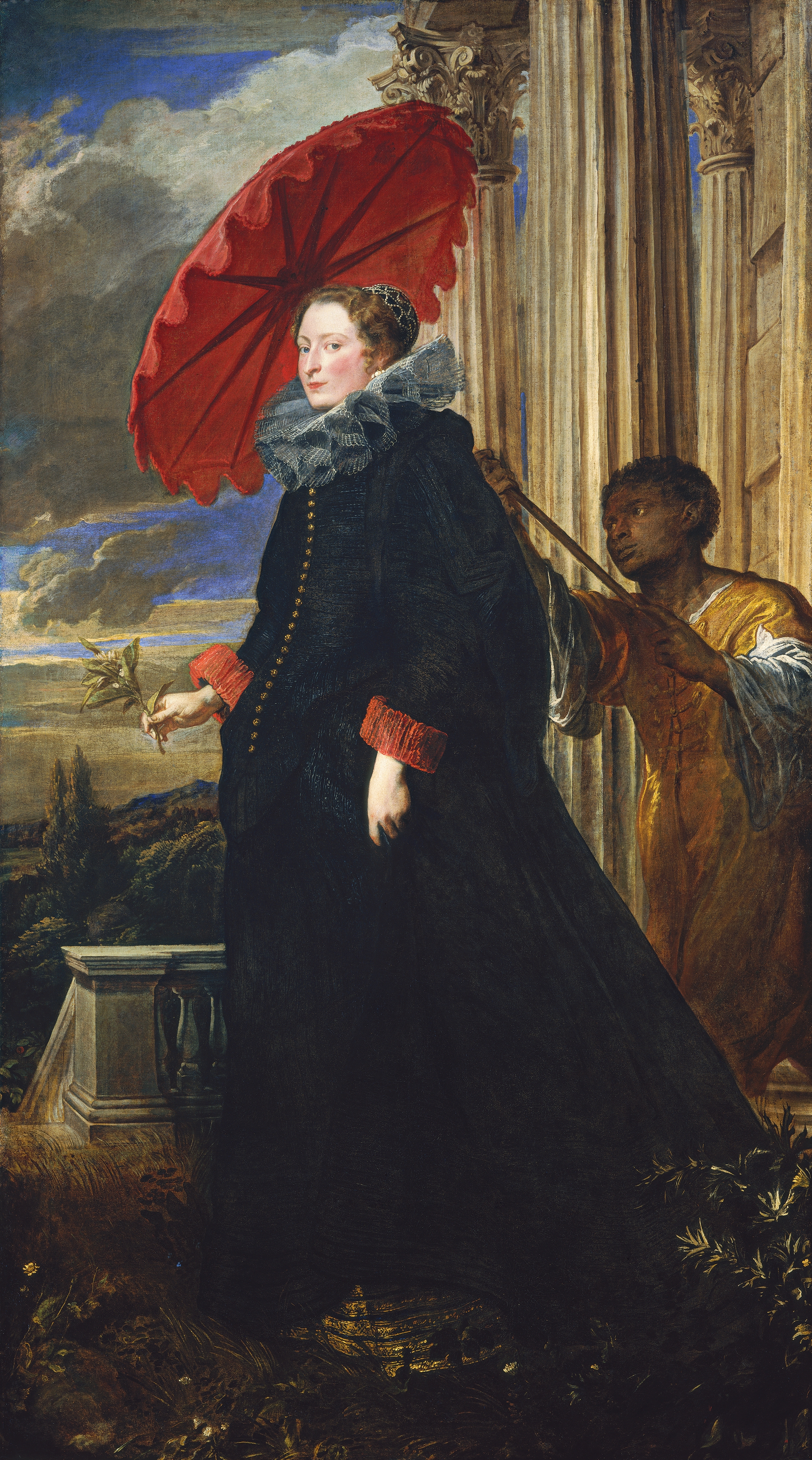
Marchesa Elena Grimaldi, by Anthony van Dyck, 1623

Thomas Wright, in his Domestic Manners of the English, gives a drawing from the Harleian MS., No. 604, which represents an Anglo-Saxon gentleman walking out attended by his servant, the servant carrying an umbrella with a handle that slopes backwards, so as to bring the umbrella over the head of the person in front. It probably could not be closed, but otherwise it looks like an ordinary umbrella, and the ribs are represented distinctly.

The use of the parasol and parapluie in France and England was adopted, probably from China, about the middle of the seventeenth century. At that period, pictorial representations of it are frequently found, some of which exhibit the peculiar broad and deep canopy belonging to the large parasol of the Chinese Government officials, borne by native attendants.

John Evelyn, in his Diary for 22 June 1664, mentions a collection of rarities shown to him by "Thompson", a Roman Catholic priest, sent by the Jesuits of Japan and China to France. Among the curiosities were "fans like those our ladies use, but much larger, and with long handles, strangely carved and filled with Chinese characters", which is evidently a description of the parasol.

In Thomas Coryat's Crudities, published in 1611, about a century and a half prior to the general introduction of the umbrella into England, is a reference to a custom of riders in Italy using umbrellas:

And many of them doe carry other fine things of a far greater price, that will cost at the least a duckat, which they commonly call in the Italian tongue umbrellas, that is, things which minister shadowve to them for shelter against the scorching heate of the sunne. These are made of leather, something answerable to the forme of a little cannopy, & hooped in the inside with divers little wooden hoopes that extend the umbrella in a pretty large compasse. They are used especially by horsemen, who carry them in their hands when they ride, fastening the end of the handle upon one of their thighs, and they impart so large a shadow unto them, that it keepeth the heate of the sunne from the upper parts of their bodies.

In John Florio's "A WORLD of Words" (1598), the Italian word Ombrella is translated

a fan, a canopie. also a testern or cloth of state for a prince. also a kind of round fan or shadowing that they vse to ride with in sommer in Italy, a little shade. Also a bonegrace for a woman. Also the husk or cod of any seede or corne. also a broad spreding bunch, as of fenell, nill, or elder bloomes.

In Randle Cotgrave's Dictionary of the French and English Tongues (1614), the French Ombrelle is translated

An umbrello; a (fashion of) round and broad fanne, wherewith the Indians (and from them our great ones) preserve themselves from the heat of a scorching sunne; and hence any little shadow, fanne, or thing, wherewith women hide their faces from the sunne.

In Fynes Moryson's Itinerary (1617) is a similar allusion to the habit of carrying umbrellas in hot countries "to auoide the beames of the Sunne". Their employment, says the author, is dangerous, "because they gather the heate into a pyramidall point, and thence cast it down perpendicularly upon the head, except they know how to carry them for auoyding that danger".

During Streynsham Master's 1676 visit to the East India Company's factory in Masulipatnam he noted that only the governor of the town and the next three officials in seniority were allowed to have "a roundell [i.e. umbrella] carried over them".

In France, the rain umbrella (parapluie) began to appear in the 1660s, when the fabric of umbrellas carried for protection against the sun was coated with wax. The inventory of the French royal court in 1763 mentioned "eleven parasols of taffeta in different colours" as well as "three parasols of waxed toile, decorated around the edges with lace of gold and silver". They were rare, and the word parapluie ("against the rain") did not enter the dictionary of the Académie française until 1718.

==== 18th and 19th centuries ====
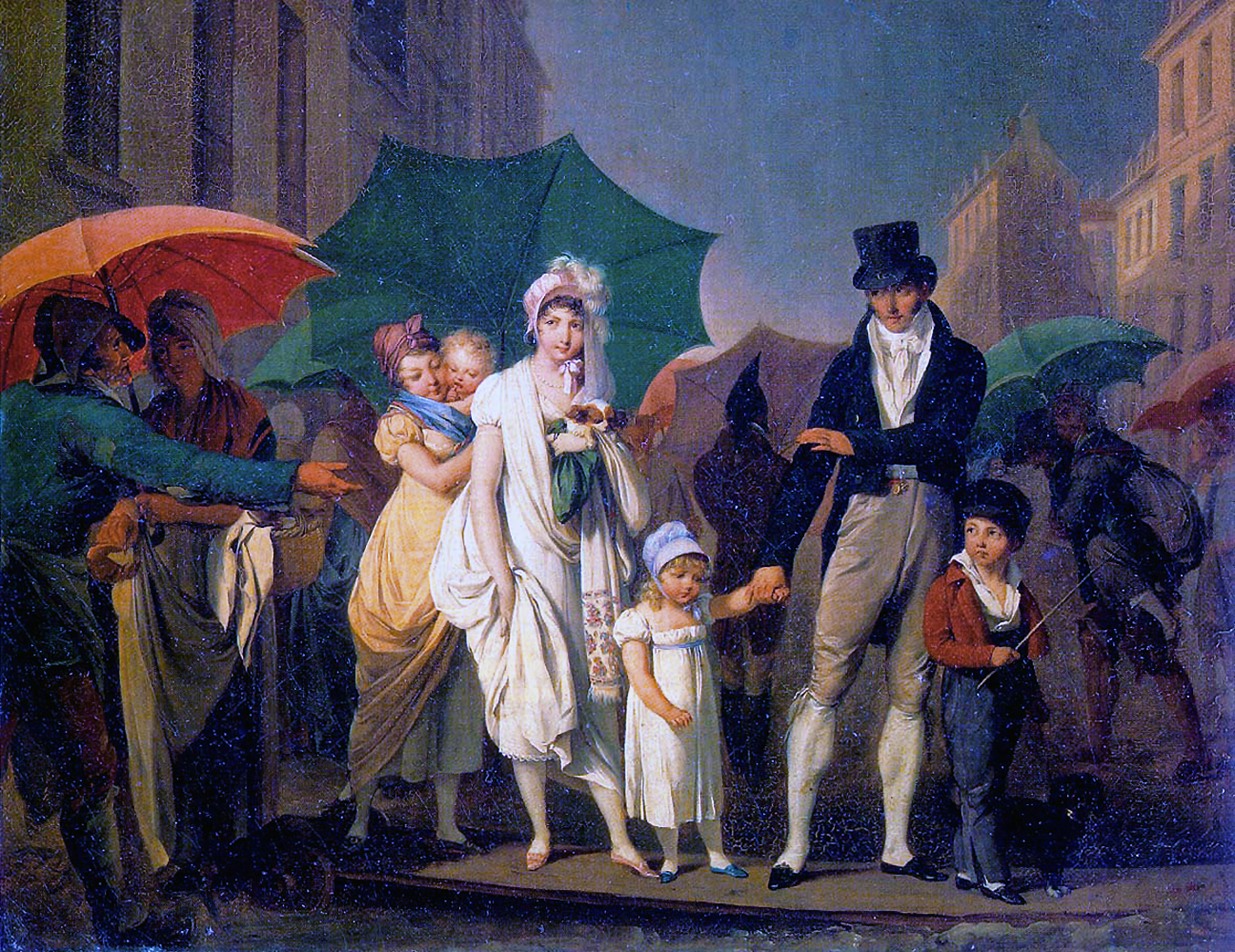
Parisians in the rain with umbrellas, by Louis-Léopold Boilly (1803)

Kersey's Dictionary (1708) describes an umbrella as a "screen commonly used by women to keep off rain".

The first lightweight folding umbrella in Europe was introduced in 1710 by a Paris merchant named Jean Marius, whose shop was located near the barrier of Saint-Honoré. It could be opened and closed in the same way as modern umbrellas and weighed less than one kilogram. Marius received from the King the exclusive right to produce folding umbrellas for five years. A model was purchased by the Princess Palatine in 1712, and she enthused about it to her aristocratic friends, making it an essential fashion item for Parisiennes. In 1759, a French scientist named Navarre presented a new design to the French Academy of Sciences for an umbrella combined with a cane. Pressing a small button on the side of the cane opened the umbrella.

Their use became widespread in Paris. In 1768, a Paris magazine reported:

"The common usage for quite some time now is not to go out without an umbrella, and to have the inconvenience of carrying it under your arm for six months in order to use it perhaps six times. Those who do not want to be mistaken for vulgar people much prefer to take the risk of being soaked, rather than to be regarded as someone who goes on foot; an umbrella is a sure sign of someone who doesn't have his own carriage."

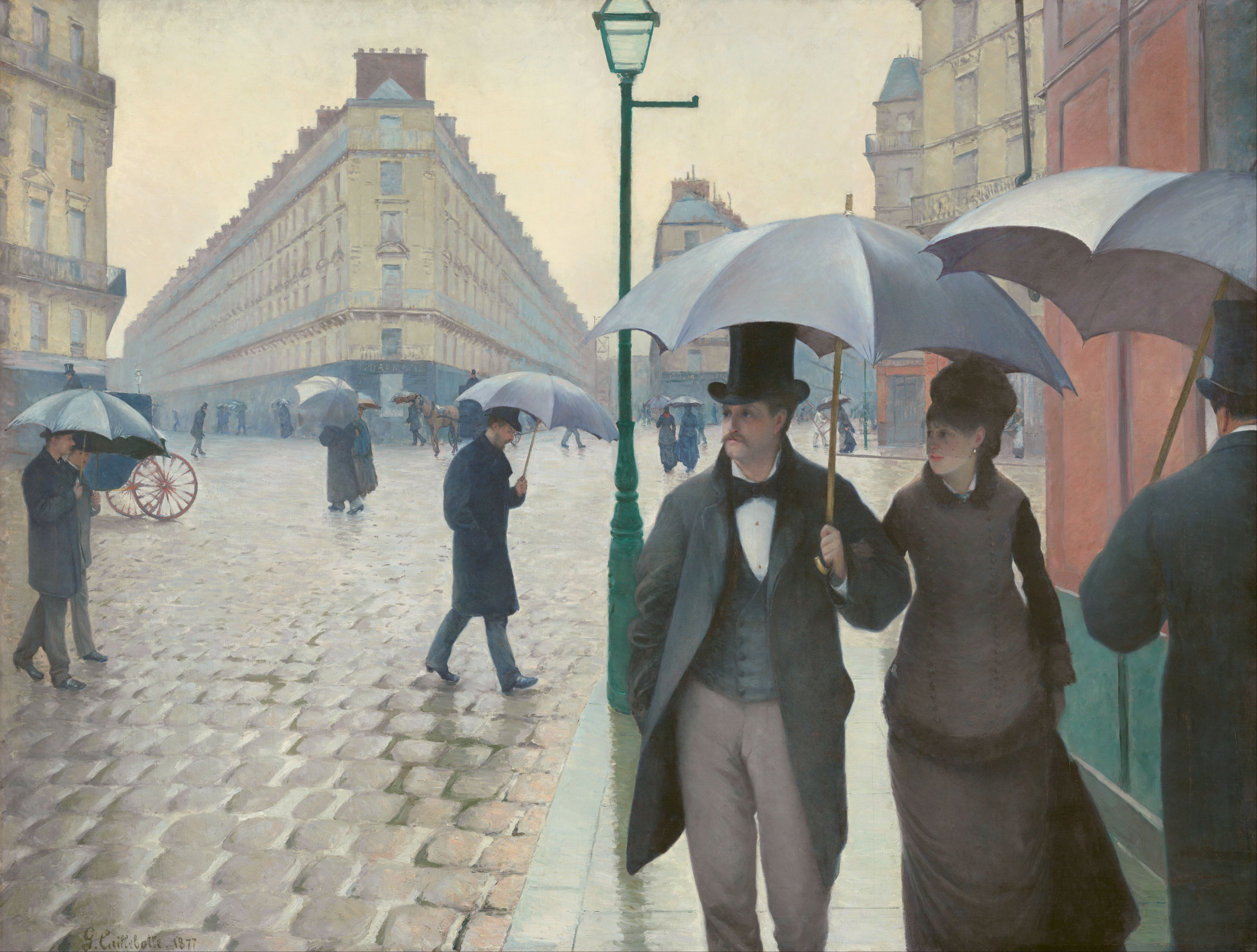
Paris Street; Rainy Day, by Gustave Caillebotte (1877)

In 1769, the Maison Antoine, a store at the Magasin d'Italie on rue Saint-Denis, was the first to offer umbrellas for rent to those caught in downpours, and it became a common practice. The Lieutenant General of Police of Paris issued regulations for the rental umbrellas; they were made of oiled green silk, and carried a number so they could be found and reclaimed if someone walked off with one.

By 1808 there were seven shops making and selling umbrellas in Paris; one shop, Sagnier on rue des Vielles-Haudriettes, received the first patent given for an invention in France for a new model of umbrella. By 1813 there were 42 shops; by 1848 there were three hundred seventy-seven small shops making umbrellas in Paris, employing 1400 workers. One of the well-known makers was Boutique Bétaille, which was located at rue Royale 20 from 1880 to 1939. Another was Revel, based in Lyon. By the end of the century, however, cheaper manufacturers in the Auvergne replaced Paris as the centre of umbrella manufacturing, and the town of Aurillac became the umbrella capital of France. The town still produces about half the umbrellas made in France; the umbrella factories there employ about one hundred workers.

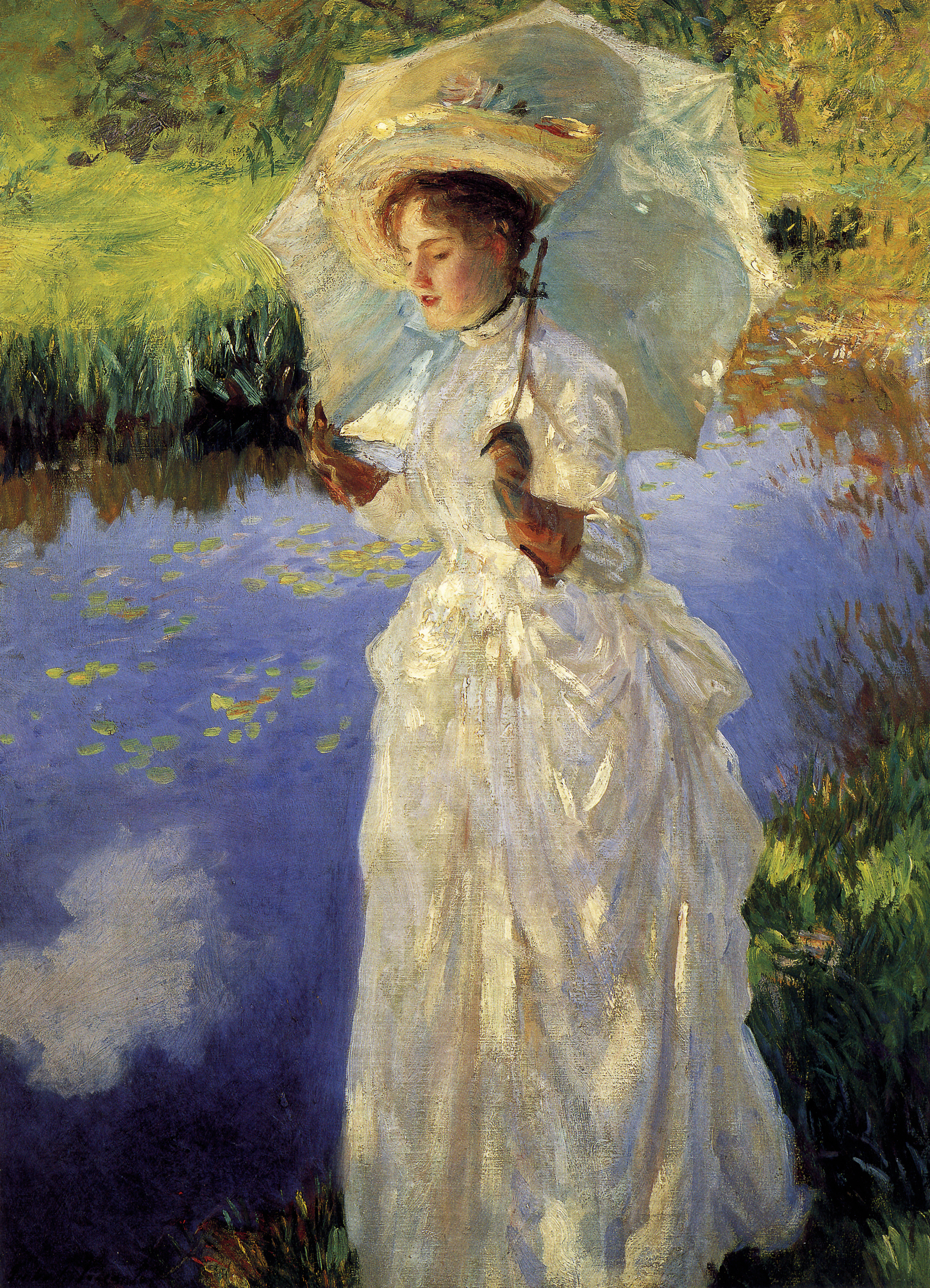
A parasol depicted in Morning Walk, by John Singer Sargent (1888)

In Daniel Defoe's Robinson Crusoe, Crusoe constructs his own umbrella in imitation of those that he had seen used in Brazil, covered with skins "so that it cast off the rains like a penthouse, and kept off the sun so effectually, that I could walk out in the hottest of the weather with greater advantage than I could before in the coolest". From this description the original heavy umbrella came to be called "Robinson" for many years in England.

Captain James Cook, in one of his voyages in the late 18th century, reported seeing some of the natives of the South Pacific Islands with umbrellas made of palm leaves. In the highlands of Mindanao in the Philippines, the large fronds of Dipteris conjugata are used as an umbrella.

The use of the umbrella or parasol (though not unknown) was uncommon in England during the earlier half of the eighteenth century, as is evident from the comment made by General (then Lieut.-Colonel) James Wolfe, when writing from Paris in 1752; he speaks of the use of umbrellas for protection from the sun and rain and wonders why a similar practice did not occur in England. About the same time, umbrellas came into general use as people found their value and got over the shyness natural to its introduction. Jonas Hanway, the founder of the Magdalen Hospital, has the credit of being the first man who ventured to dare public reproach and ridicule by carrying one habitually in London. As he died in 1786, and he is said to have carried an umbrella for thirty years, the date of its first use by him may be set down at about 1750. John Macdonald relates that in 1770, he used to be addressed as, "Frenchman, Frenchman! why don't you call a coach?" whenever he went out with his umbrella. By 1788 however they seem to have been accepted: a London newspaper advertises the sale of "improved and pocket Umbrellas, on steel frames, with every other kind of common Umbrella".

Since then, the umbrella has come into general use, in consequence of numerous improvements. In China people learned how to waterproof their paper umbrellas with wax and lacquer. The transition to the present portable form is due, partly, to the substitution of silk and gingham for the heavy and troublesome oiled silk, which admitted of the ribs and frames being made much lighter, and also to many ingenious mechanical improvements in the framework. Victorian era umbrellas had frames of wood or baleen, but these devices were expensive and hard to fold when wet. Samuel Fox is credited with inventing the steel-ribbed umbrella in 1852; however, the Encyclopédie Méthodique mentions metal ribs at the end of the eighteenth century, and they were also on sale in London during the 1780s. Modern designs usually employ a telescoping steel trunk; new materials such as cotton, plastic film and nylon often replace the original silk.

== Modern use ==
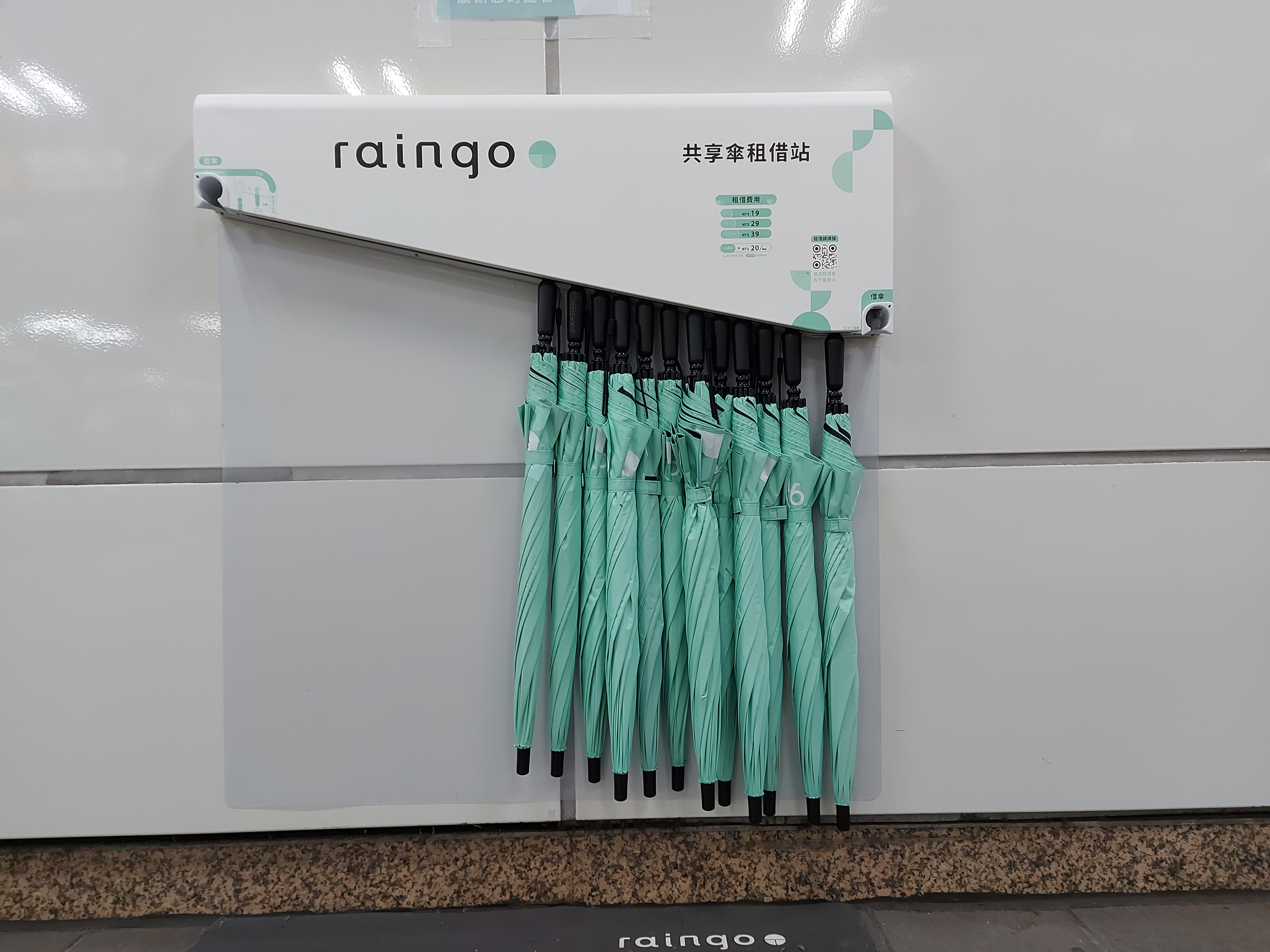
Umbrellas for rent in the Taipei subway system

A stream of people and parapluies inside the Tokyo Imperial Palace on a rainy autumn day

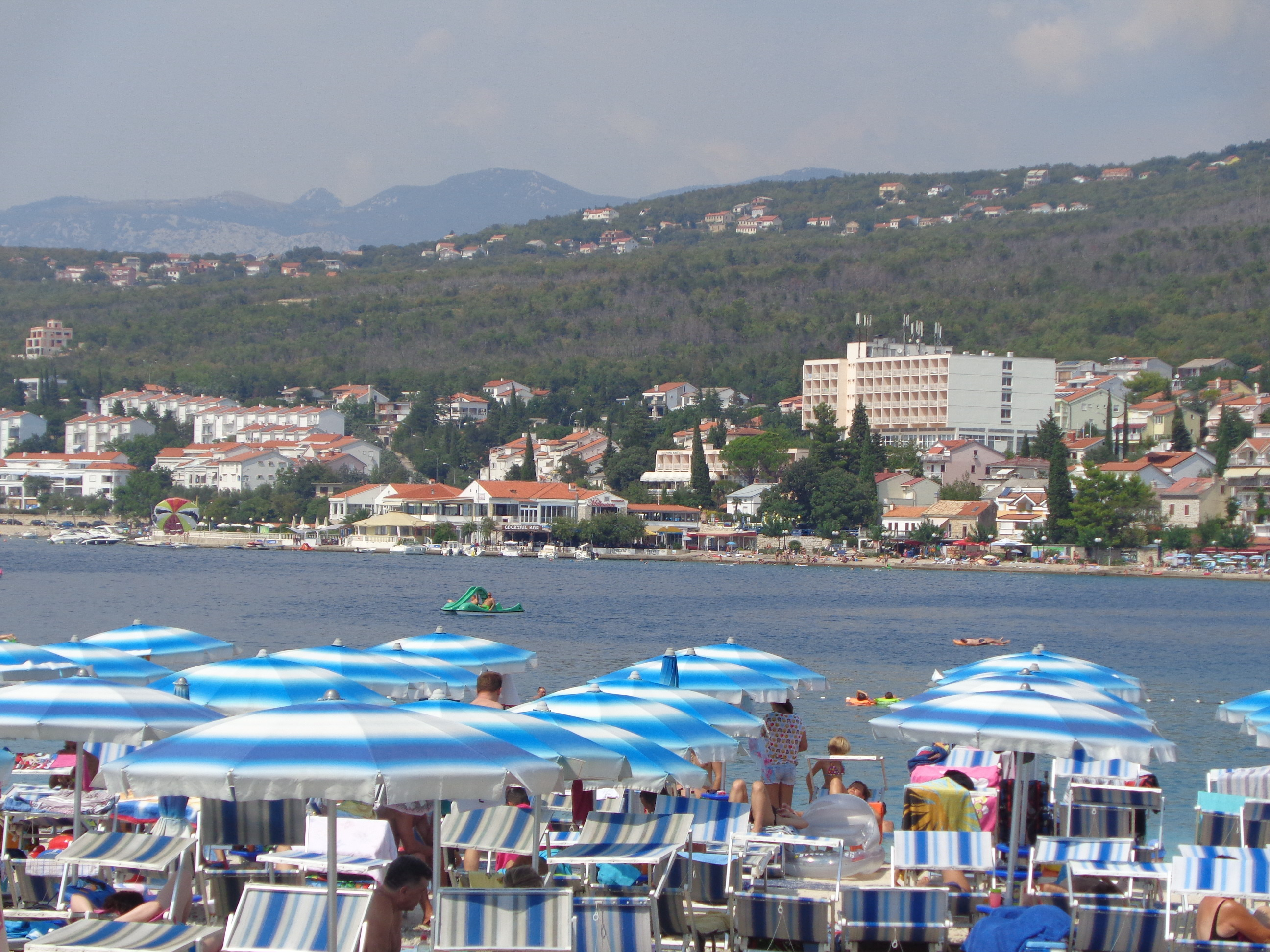
Beach umbrellas in Selce, Croatia

National Umbrella Day is held on 10 February each year around the world.

The pocket (foldable) umbrella was invented in Uraiújfalu (Hungary) by the Balogh brothers, whose patent request was admitted in 1923 by the Royal Notary Public of Szombathely. Later on their patent was also approved in Austria, Germany, Belgium, France, Poland, Great Britain and the United States.

In 1928, Hans Haupt's pocket umbrellas appeared. In Vienna in 1928, Slawa Horowitz, a student studying sculpture at the Akademie der Bildenden Kunste Wien (Academy of Fine Arts), developed a prototype for an improved compact foldable umbrella for which she received a patent on 19 September 1929. The umbrella was called "Flirt" and manufactured by the Austrian company "Brüder Wüster" and their German associates "Kortenbach & Rauh". In Germany, the small foldable umbrellas were produced by the company "Knirps", which became a synonym in the German language for small foldable umbrellas in general. In 1969, Bradford E Phillips, the owner of Totes Incorporated of Loveland, Ohio, obtained a patent for his "working folding umbrella".

Umbrellas have also been fashioned into hats as early as 1880 and at least as recently as 1987.

Golf umbrellas, one of the largest sizes in common use, are typically around 62 inches (157 cm) across but can range anywhere from 60 to 70 inches (150 to 180 cm).

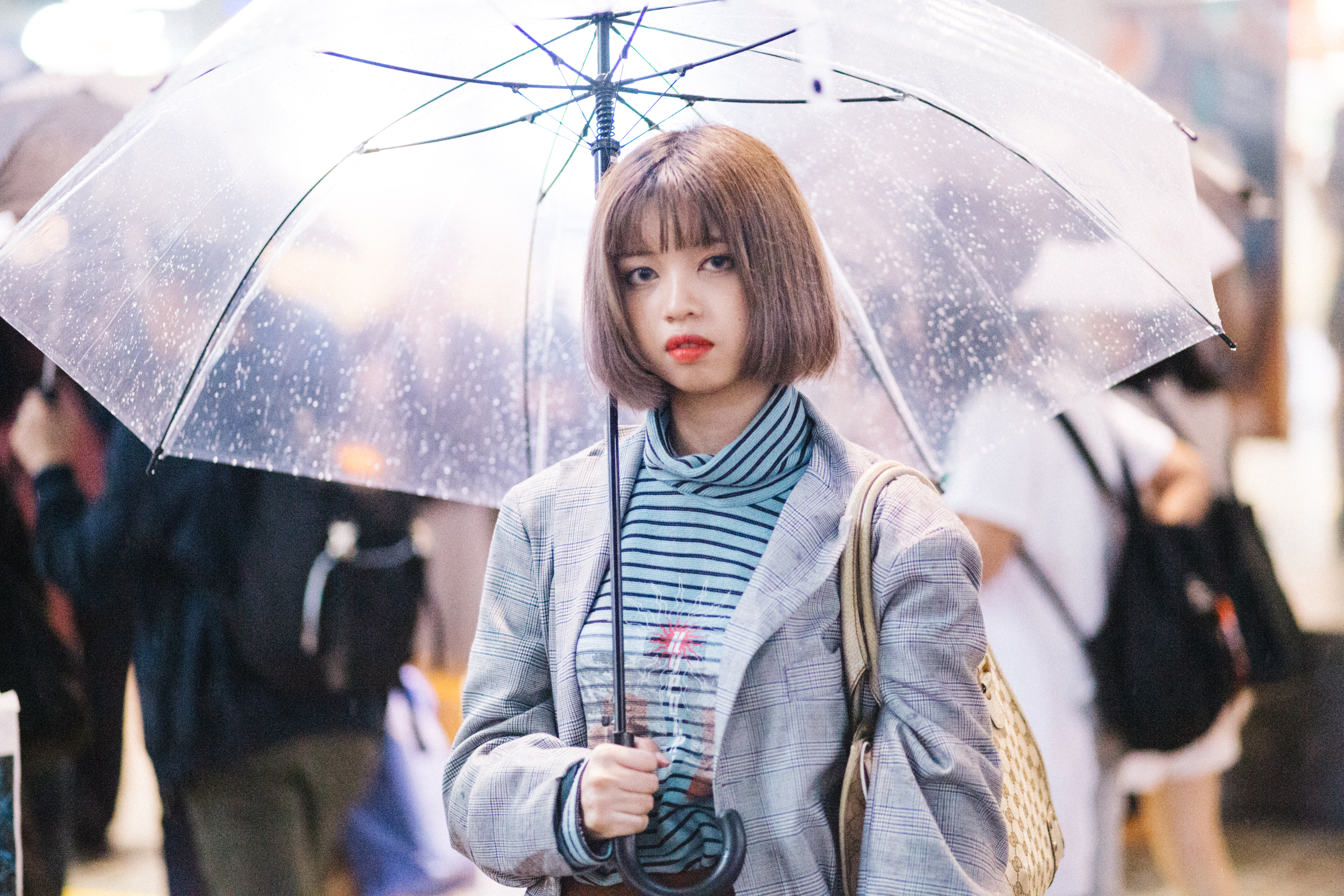
A transparent parapluie

Transparent umbrellas, often made with plastic or composite materials, were invented in 1958 by Mitsuo Sudou. The transparent umbrellas were popularized as fashion items during the 1964 Tokyo Olympics. The production had since been relocated to China and other Asian countries and has become ubiquitous on Japanese streets due to its affordability, aesthetics, and ease of access.

Umbrellas are now a consumer product with a large global market. As of 2008, most umbrellas worldwide are made in China, mostly in the Guangdong, Fujian and Zhejiang provinces. The city of Shangyu alone had more than a thousand umbrella factories. In the US alone, about 33 million umbrellas, worth $348 million, are sold each year.

Umbrellas continue to be actively developed. In the US, so many umbrella-related patents are being filed that the U.S. Patent Office employs four full-time examiners to assess them. As of 2008, the office registered 3000 active patents on umbrella-related inventions. Nonetheless, Totes, the largest American umbrella producer, has stopped accepting unsolicited proposals. Its director of umbrella development was reported as saying that while umbrellas are so ordinary that everyone thinks about them, "it's difficult to come up with an umbrella idea that hasn't already been done."

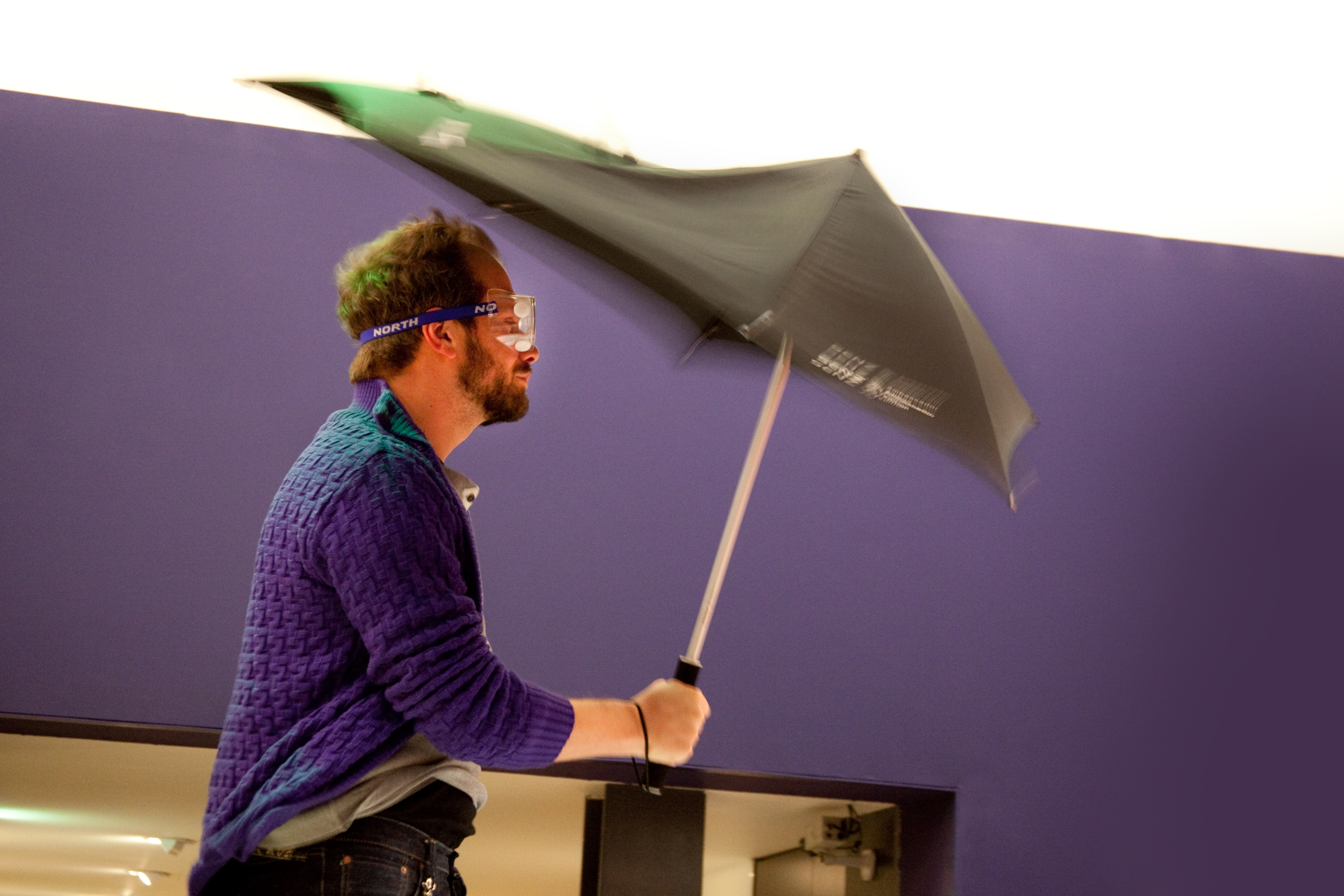
Testing a Senz storm umbrella in Rotterdam, using a high-powered fan

While the predominant canopy shape of an umbrella is round, canopy shapes have been streamlined to improve aerodynamic response to wind. Examples include the stealth-shaped canopy of Rizotti (1996), scoop-shaped canopy of Lisciandro (2004), and teardrop-shaped canopies of Hollinger (2004).

In 2005 Gerwin Hoogendoorn, a Dutch industrial design student of the Delft University of Technology in the Netherlands, invented an aerodynamically streamlined storm umbrella (similar in shape to a stealth aircraft) which can withstand wind force 10 (winds of up to 100 km/h or 70 mph) and will not turn inside-out like a normal umbrella as well as being equipped with so-called "eye savers" which protect others from being accidentally wounded by the tips. Hoogendoorn's storm umbrella was nominated for and won several design awards, and was featured on Good Morning America. The umbrella is sold in Europe as the Senz umbrella and is sold under license by Totes in the United States.

Alan Kaufman's "Nubrella" and Greg Brebner's "Blunt" are other contemporary designs.

== Other uses ==
The umbrella is used in weather forecasting as an icon for rain. Two variations, a plain umbrella (☂, U+2602) and an umbrella with raindrops overhead (☔, U+2614), are encoded in the Miscellaneous Symbols block of Unicode.

Open umbrellas were used by critics of Neville Chamberlain. This protest tactic was then adopted by conservative Americans in the 1950s and 60s who perceived certain politicians to be "appeasing the enemies of the United States".

=== In religious ceremony ===
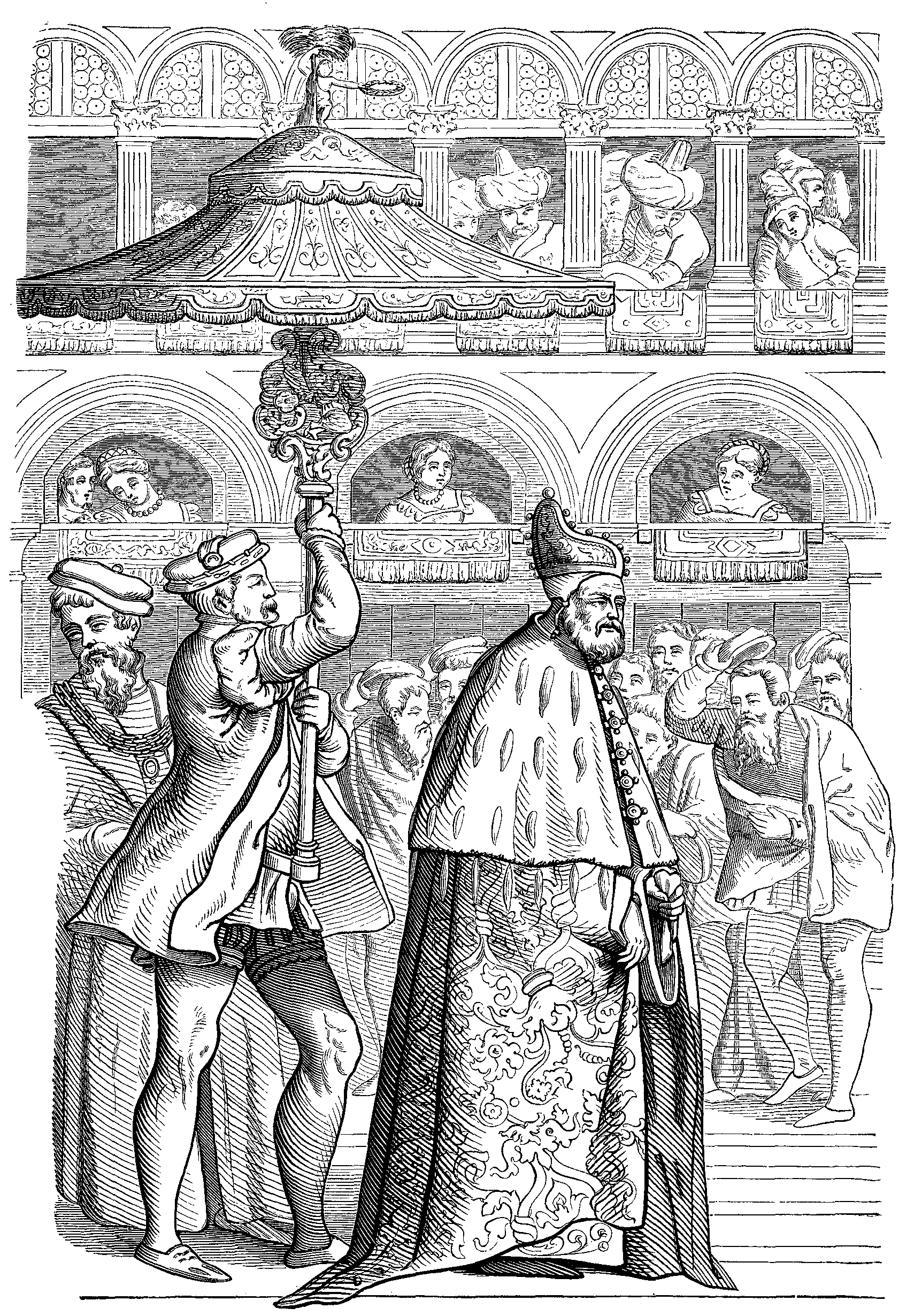
Grand Procession of the Doge of Venice (16th century)

As a canopy of state, umbrellas were generally used in southern and eastern Europe, and then passed from the imperial court into church ceremony. They are found in the ceremonies of the Byzantine Rite, were borne over the Host in procession, and form part of the Pontifical regalia.

==== Catholic Church ====
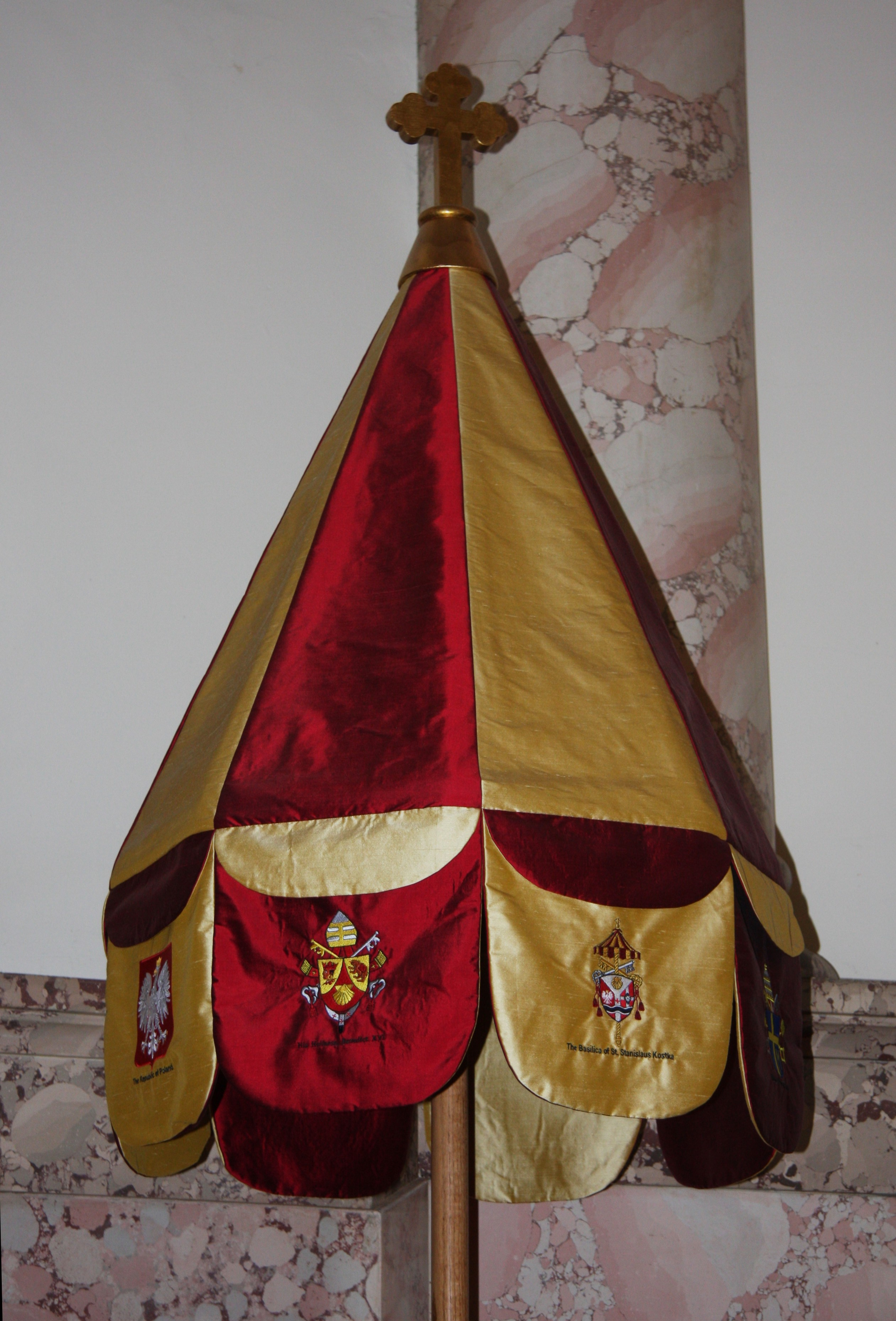
Umbraculum in the Basilica of Saint Stanislaus Kostka in Winona, Minnesota

An umbrella, the ombrellino (Italian) or umbraculum (Latin) is an historic piece of the papal regalia. Although the popes no longer use it personally, it is displayed on the coat of arms of a sede vacante (the papal arms used between the death of a pope and the election of his successor). This umbraculum is normally made of alternating red and gold fabric, and is usually displayed in a partially unfolded manner. The popes have traditionally bestowed the use of the umbraculum as a mark of honor upon specific persons and places. The use of an umbraculum is one of the honorary symbols of a basilica and may be used in the basilica's coat of arms and carried in processions by the basilica's canons.

A large umbrella is displayed in each of the Basilicas of Rome, and a cardinal bishop who receives his title from one of those churches has the privilege of having an umbrella carried over his head in solemn processions. Beatiano, an Italian herald, says that "a vermilion umbrella in a field argent symbolizes dominion".

Roman Catholic liturgy also uses an umbrella, known as the umbraculum or ombrellino. It is held over the Holy Sacrament of the Eucharist and its carrier by a server in short processions taking place indoors, or until the priest is met at the sanctuary entrance by the bearers of the processional canopy or baldacchino. It is regularly white or golden (the colours reserved for the Holy Sacrament) and made of silk.

==== Oriental Orthodox Churches ====
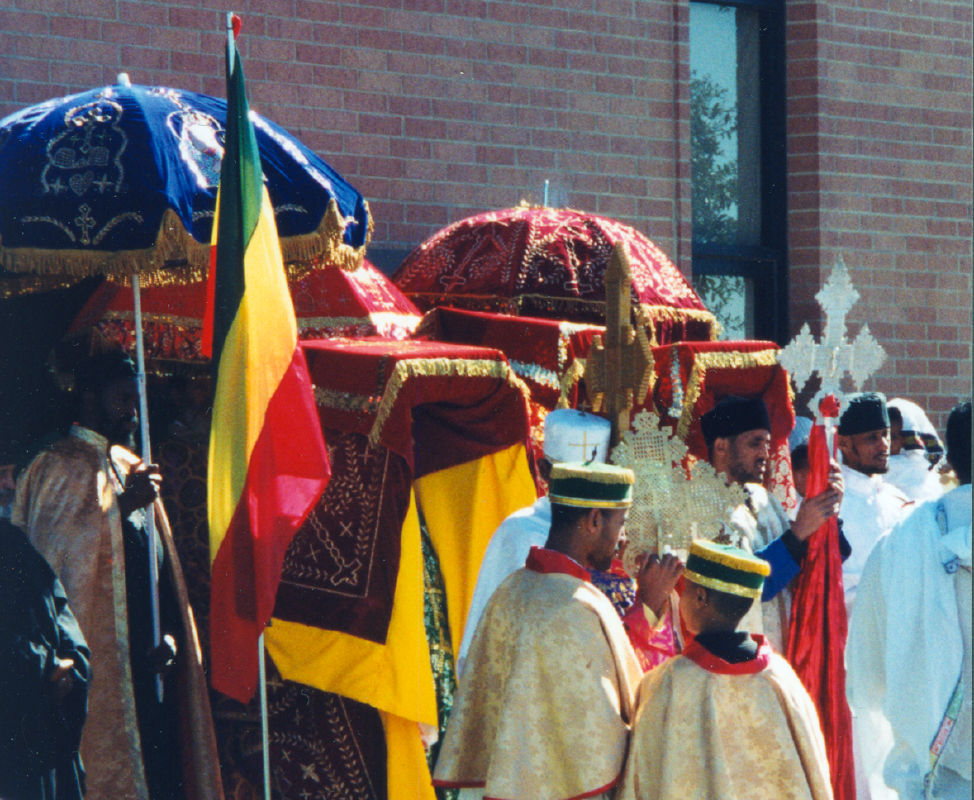
Ethiopian Orthodox clergymen lead a procession in celebration of Saint Michael. The priests carry ornately covered Tabota around the church's exterior, assisted by deacons holding liturgical umbrellas.

In several Oriental Orthodox Churches, such as the Ethiopian Orthodox Tewahedo Church, umbrellas are used liturgically to show honor to a person (such as a bishop) or a holy object. In the ceremonies of Timkat (Epiphany), priests will carry a model of the Tablets of Stone, called a Tabot, on their heads in procession to a body of water, which will then be blessed. Brightly colored embroidered and fringed liturgical parasols are carried above the Tabota during this procession. Such processions also take place on other major feast days.

=== In Buddhism ===
A decorated parasol is ushered over relics and statues of Gautama Buddha, Buddhist scriptures, and Bhikkhus, as a sign of respect.

=== In photography ===
Umbrellas with a reflective inside are used by photographers as a diffusion device when employing artificial lighting, and as a glare shield and shade, most often in portrait situations. Some umbrellas are shoot-through umbrellas, meaning the light goes through the umbrella and is diffused, rather than reflecting off the inside of the umbrella.

=== As a weapon of attack ===
In 1835, the Baron Charles Random de Berenger instructed readers of his book How to Protect Life and Property in several methods of using an umbrella as an improvised weapon against highwaymen.

In 1897, journalist J. F. Sullivan proposed the umbrella as a misunderstood weapon in a tongue-in-cheek article for the Ludgate Monthly.

Between 1899 and 1902, both umbrellas and walking sticks as self defence weapons were incorporated into the repertoire of Bartitsu.

In January 1902, an article in The Daily Mirror instructed women on how they could defend themselves from ruffians with an umbrella or parasol.

In March 2011, media outlets revealed that French president Nicolas Sarkozy had started using a £10,000 armor-plated umbrella to protect him from attackers. "Para Pactum" is a Kevlar-coated device made by The Real Cherbourg. It will be carried by a member of Sarkozy's security team.

During the 2014 Hong Kong protests, sometimes referred to as the "Umbrella Revolution", protesters used umbrellas as shields against the pepper spray and tear gas used by riot police.

==== Examples of incidents ====
- In 1978, Bulgarian dissident writer Georgi Markov was killed in London by a dose of ricin injected via a modified umbrella. The KGB is widely believed to have developed a modified umbrella that could deliver a deadly pellet.
- In 2005, in a well-known case in South Africa, Brian Hahn, associate professor of mathematics and applied mathematics at the University of Cape Town, was beaten to death with an umbrella by ex-doctoral student Maleafisha Steve Tladi.
- In 2007, a 23-year-old woman in Rome was killed by another woman in the subway by stabbing through the eye using an umbrella.
- In 2019, a priest in Berlin was killed by having an umbrella rammed upward through his open mouth, piercing into his brain.

==== In arts and entertainment ====
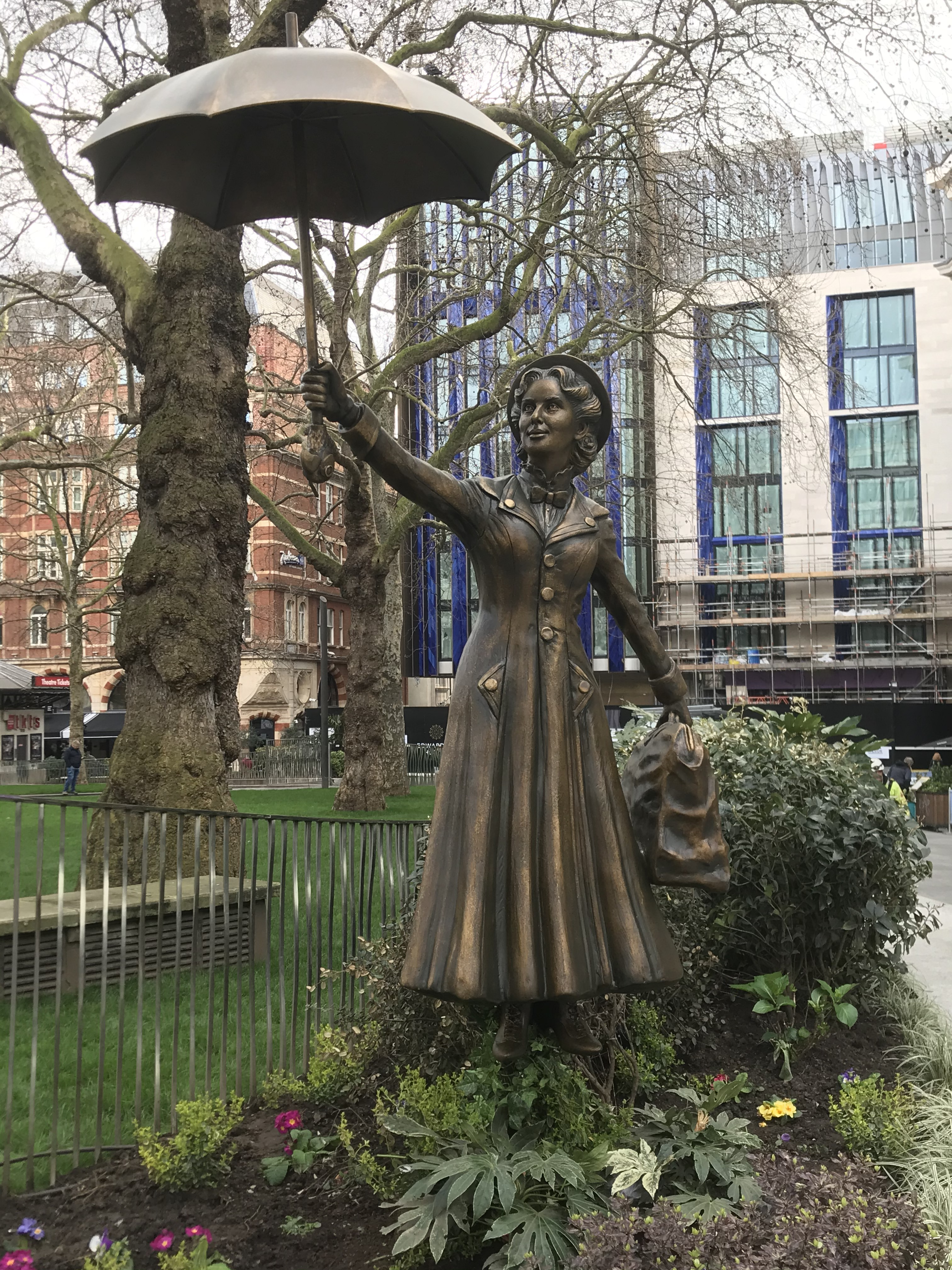
Mary Poppins statue in Leicester Square, London

- The magical nanny Mary Poppins leaves the Banks home in Cherry Tree Lane, London, with the wind carrying her, by blowing into her opened umbrella.
- John Steed, in the 1960s television series The Avengers, used an umbrella which was also a swordstick.
- In the DC Comics, the Penguin, an enemy of Batman, sports umbrellas as weapons with machine guns, rocket launchers, flamethrowers, swords, switchblades, acid guns, ray guns, and gas guns.
- A high-tech bullet-resistant umbrella is used extensively as a weapon in the film Kingsman: The Secret Service (2015), by characters Harry Hart (Colin Firth) and Eggsy Unwin (Taron Egerton).
- In the Kirby video game series, one of Kirby's Copy Abilities, called Parasol, has Kirby using a parasol as a weapon. It is also used to slow Kirby's descent when in the air.
- Players use victory reward umbrellas to glide into the battle arena in the video game Fortnite Battle Royale.
- The song "Umbrella" by Rihanna references umbrellas extensively, with limited references to rain.

== In architecture ==
In the 1950s, Frei Otto transformed the universally used individual umbrella into an item of lightweight architecture. He developed a new umbrella form, based on the minimum surface principle. The tension loaded membrane of the funnel-shaped umbrella is now stretched under the compression-loaded bars. This construction type made it technically and structurally possible to build very large convertible umbrellas. The first umbrellas of this kind (Federal Garden Exhibition, Kassel, 1955) were fixed, Frei Otto constructed the first convertible large umbrellas for the Federal Garden Exhibition in Cologne 1971. In 1978 he built a group of ten convertible umbrellas for British rock group Pink Floyd's American tour. The great beauty of these lightweight structures inspired many subsequent projects built all over the world. The largest convertible umbrellas built until now were designed by Mahmoud Bodo Rasch and his team at SL-Rasch to provide shelter from sun and rain for the great mosques in Saudi Arabia.

Later works by the architect Le Corbusier such as Centre Le Corbusier and Villa Shodhan involve a parasol, which served as a roof structure and provided cover from the sun and wind.

== In art ==
Umbrellas and parasols in art

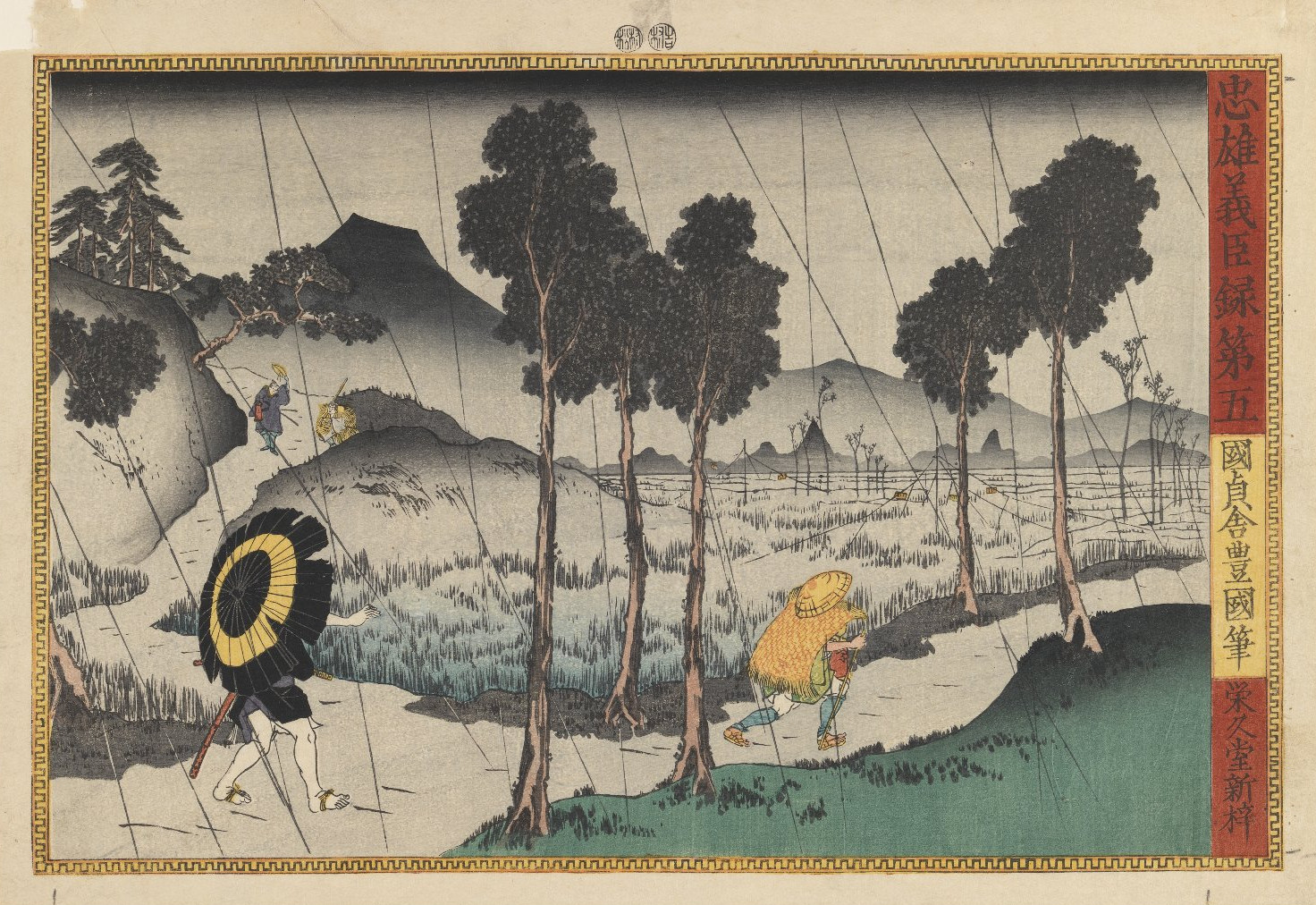
Utagawa Kunisada

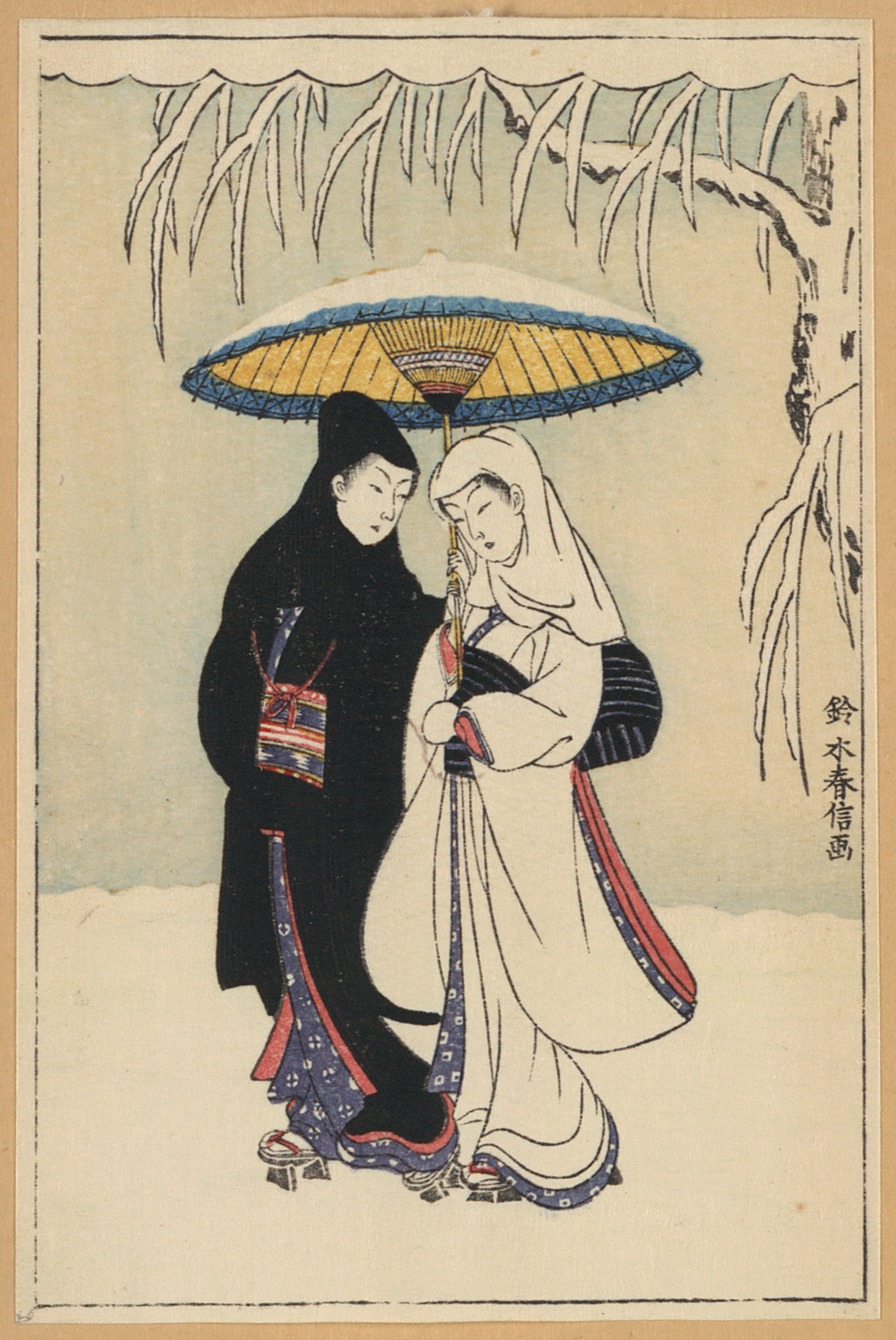
Couple under umbrella in snow, Suzuki Harunobu

The parasol is one of the Eight Auspicious Symbols of Tibetan Buddhism.

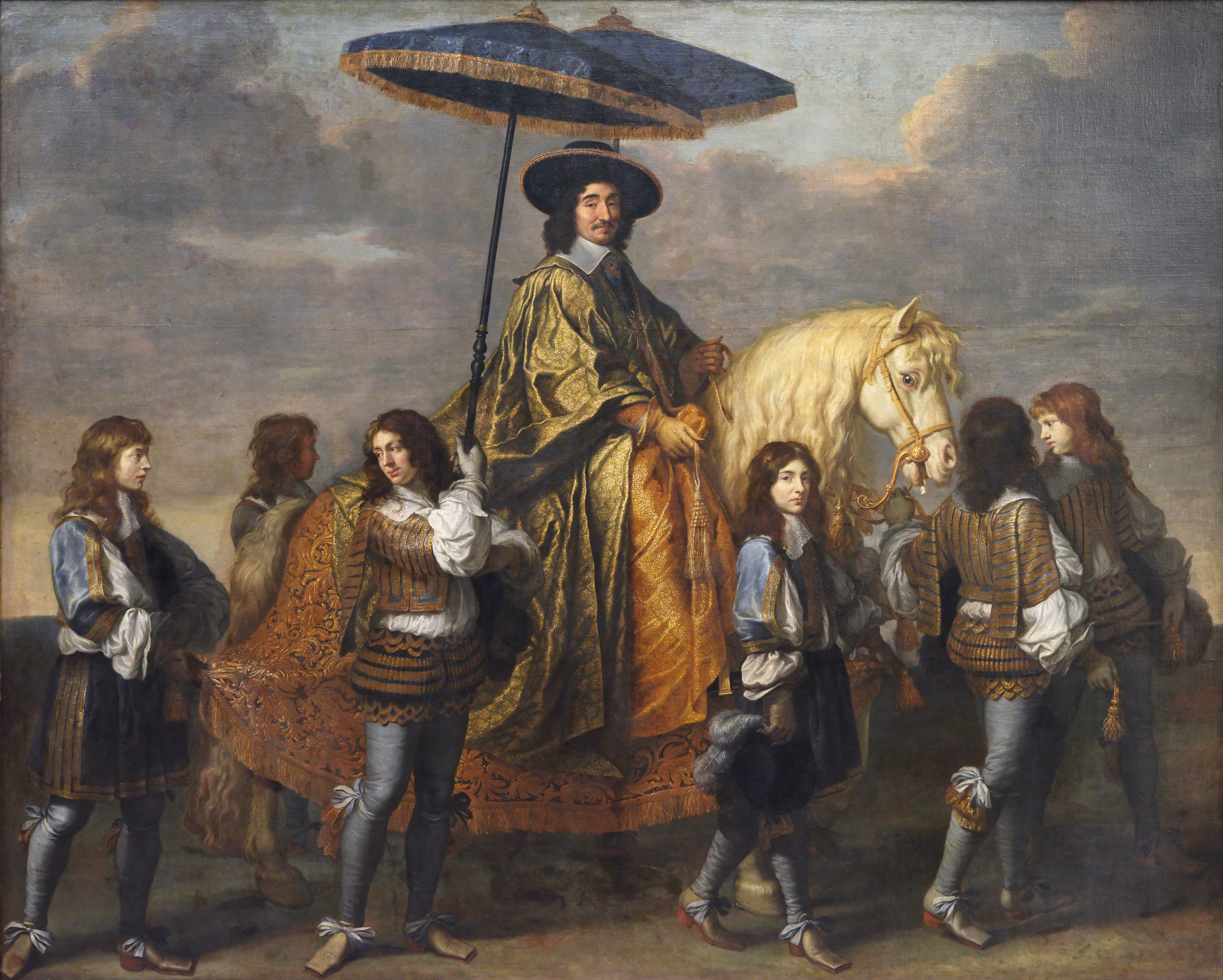
A painting of Chancellor Pierre Séguier with an umbrella hoisted above his head, by Charles Le Brun, 1670

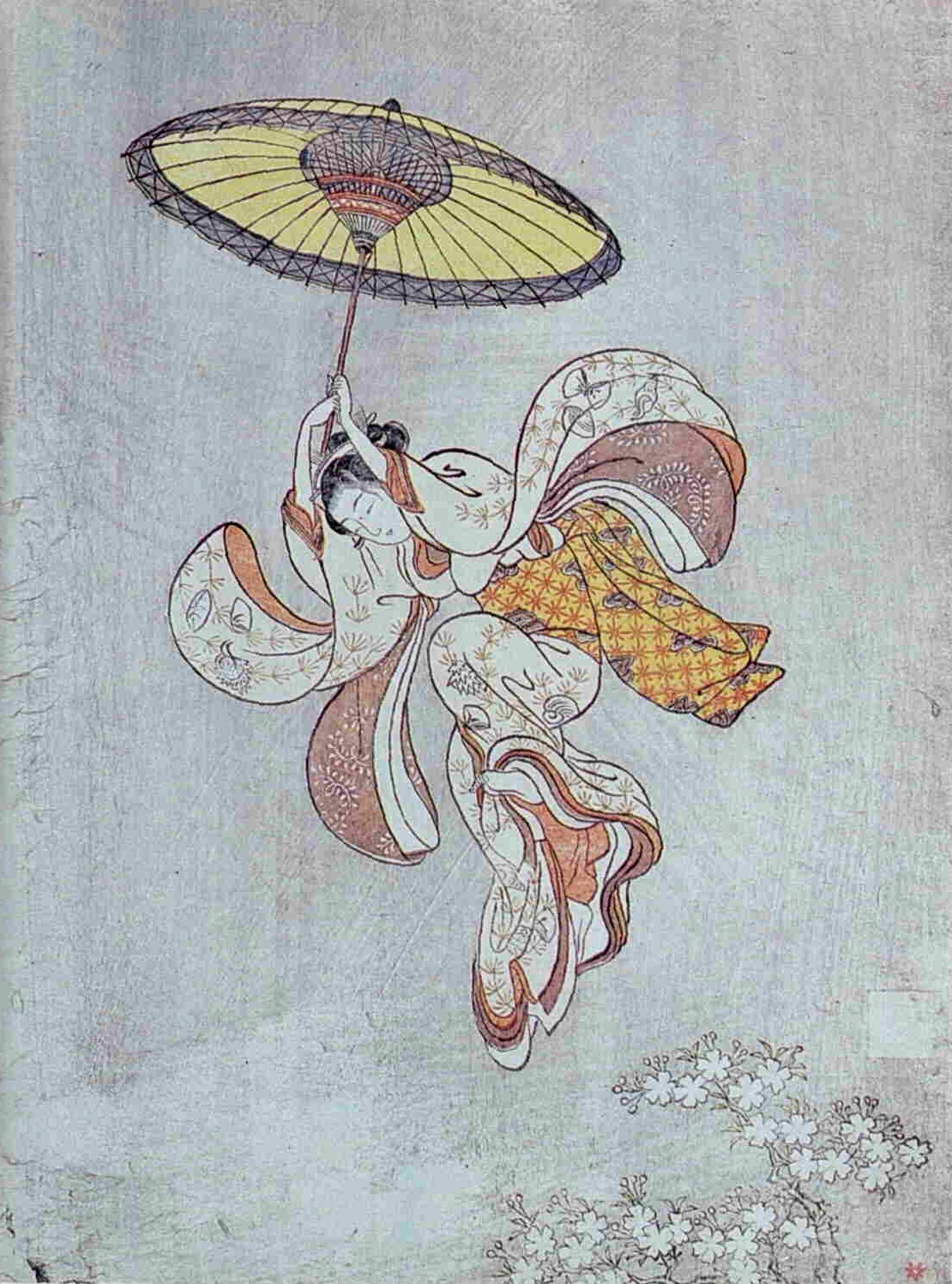
Japanese girl jumps from Kiyomizu-dera, Suzuki Harunobu, 1750

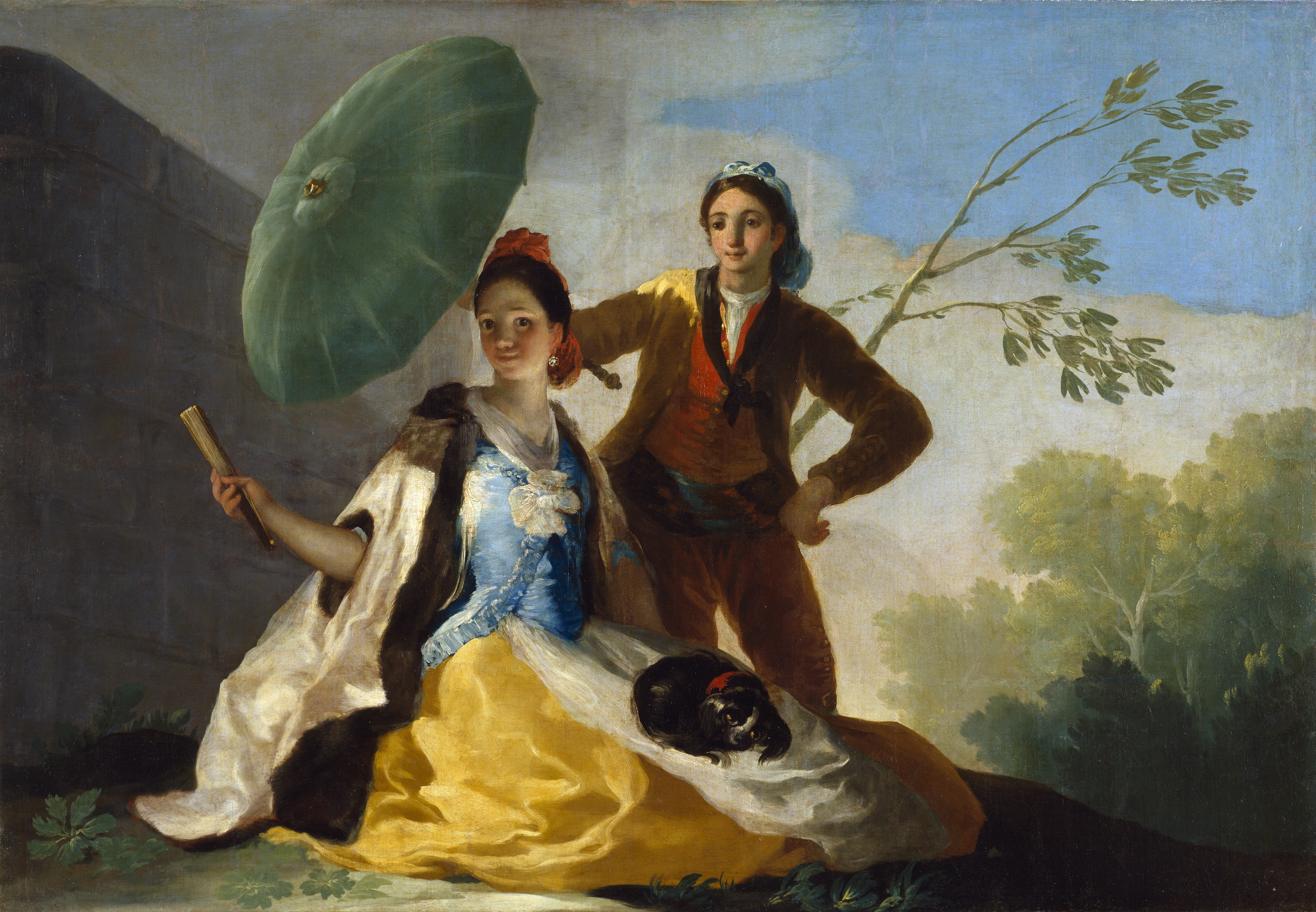
The Parasol, by Francisco Goya, 1777

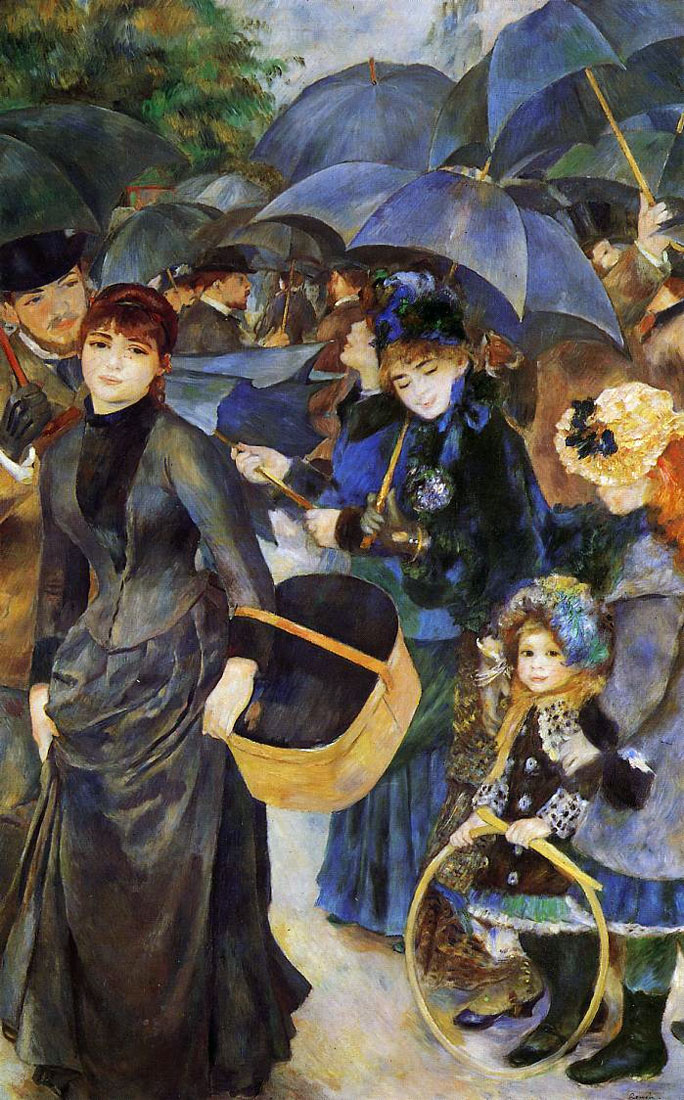
Pierre-Auguste Renoir, Umbrellas, 1883

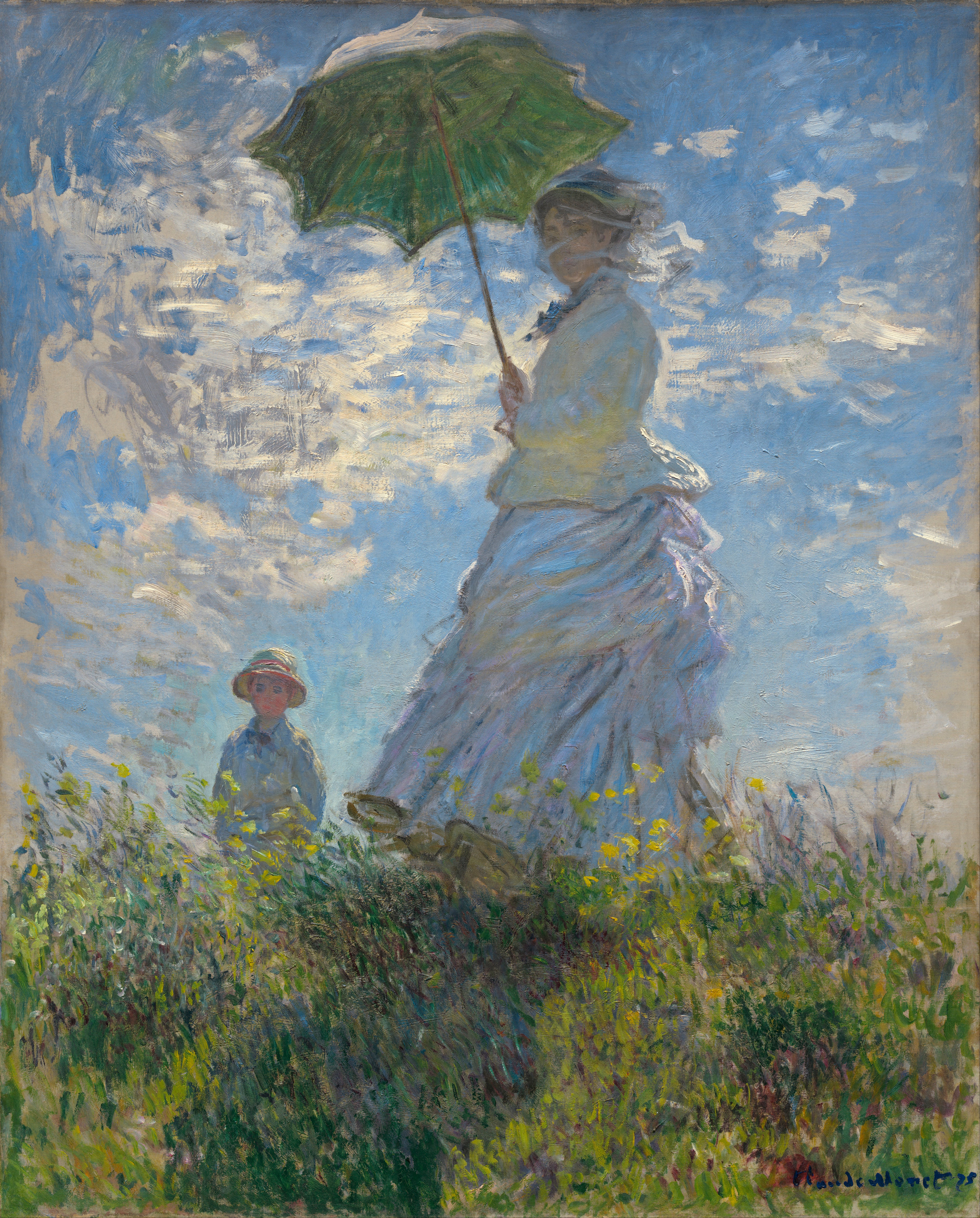
Woman with a Parasol – Madame Monet and Her Son, 1875

Woman with a parasol, by Édouard Manet, 1881

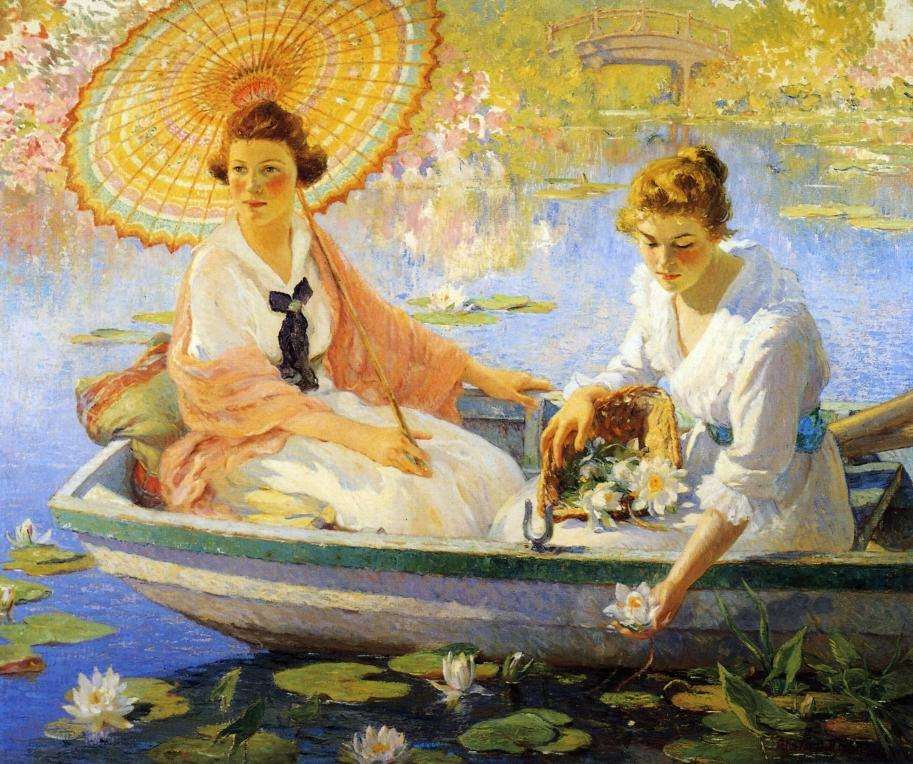
Colin Campbell Cooper, Summer, 1918

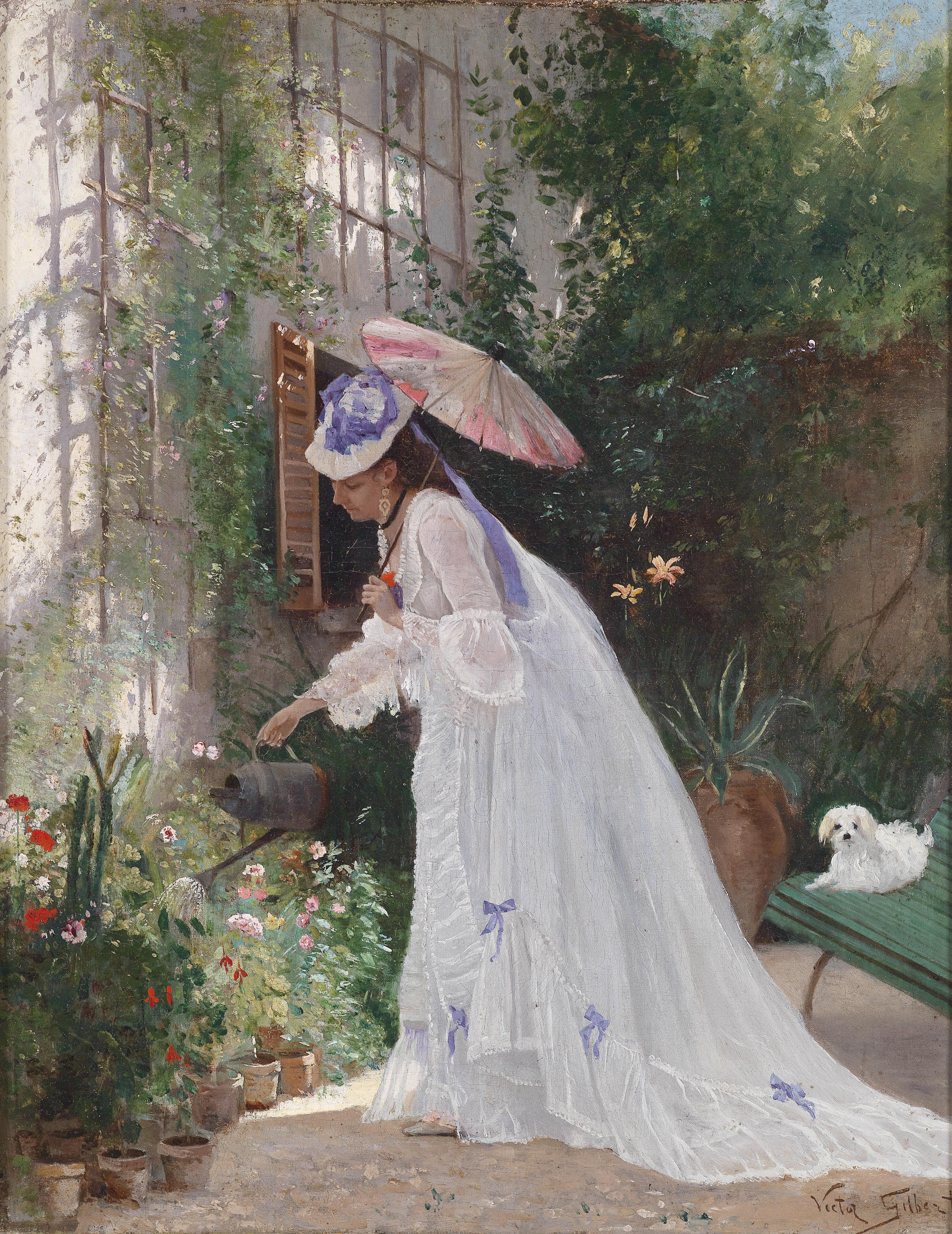
Victor Gabriel Gilbert, woman with Japanese parasol, 1933

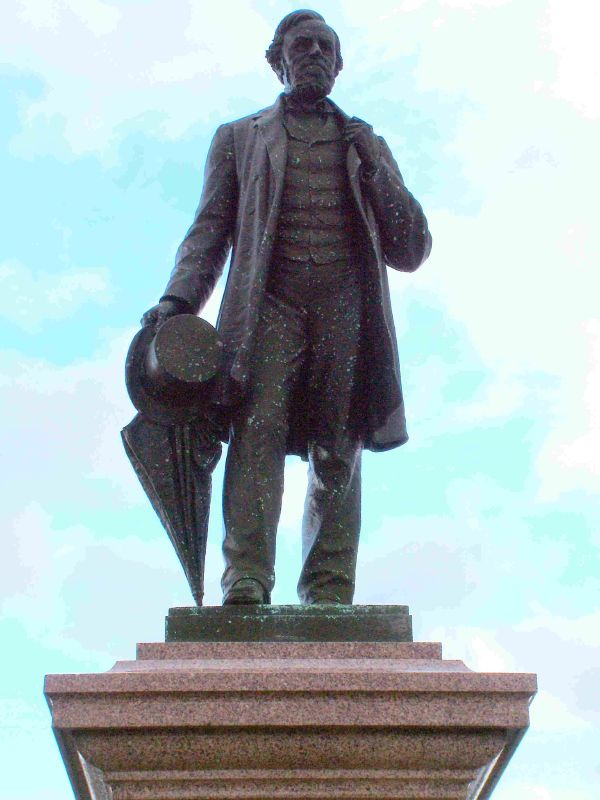
Statue of George Palmer by George Blackall Simmonds, 1891

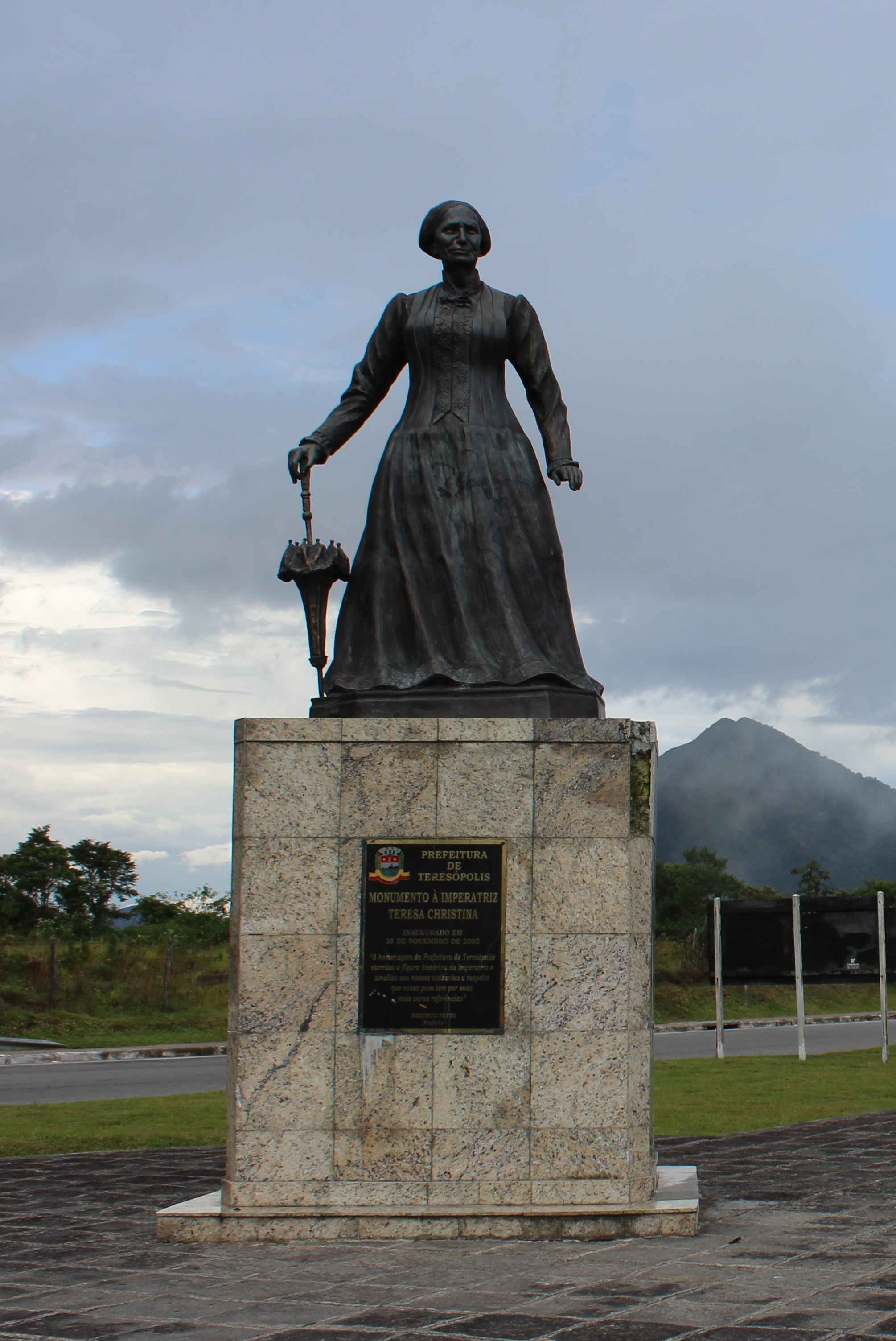
Statue of Empress Teresa Cristina of Brazil. It was erected in 2005.

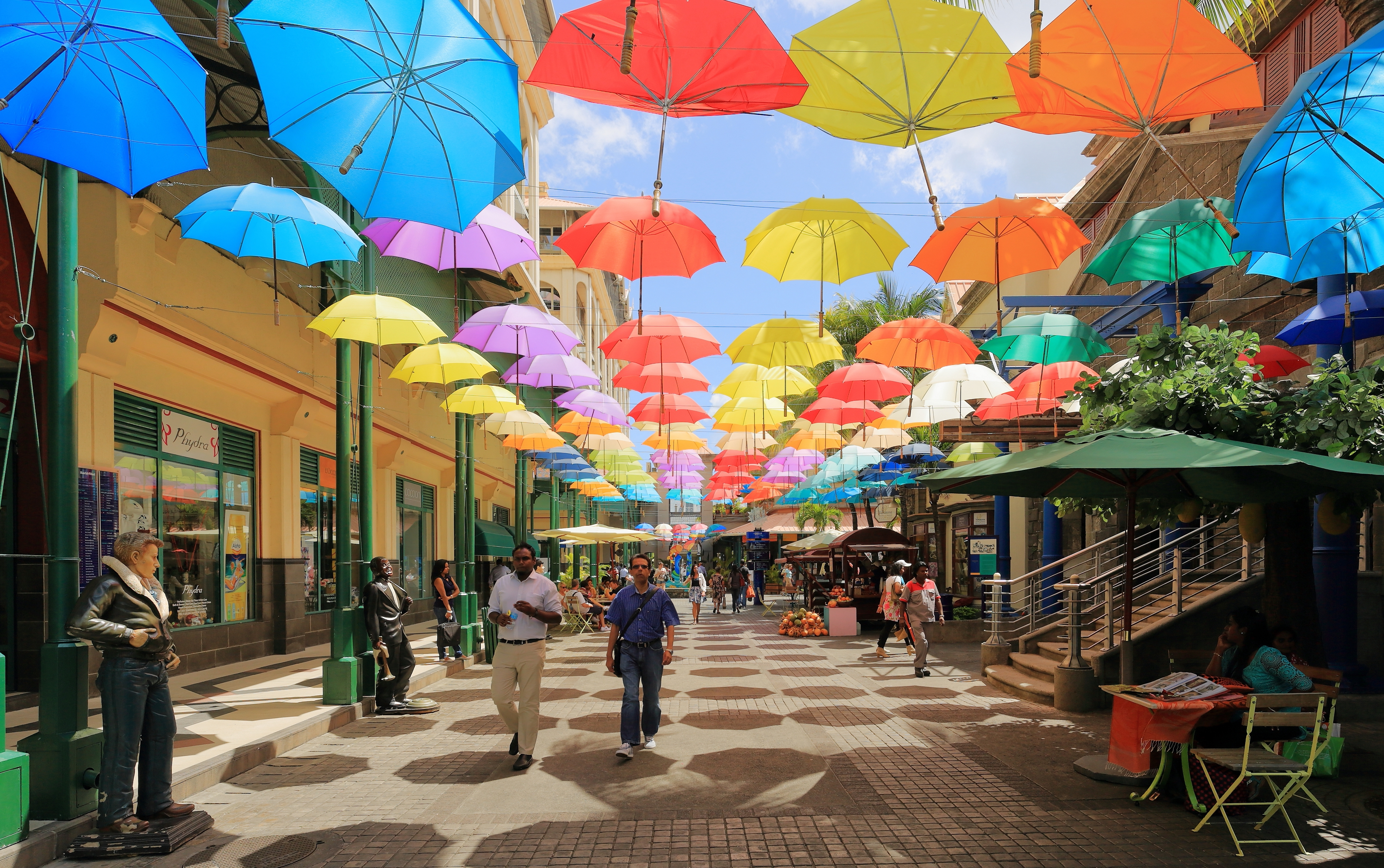
Contemporary Street Art in Port Louis, Mauritius

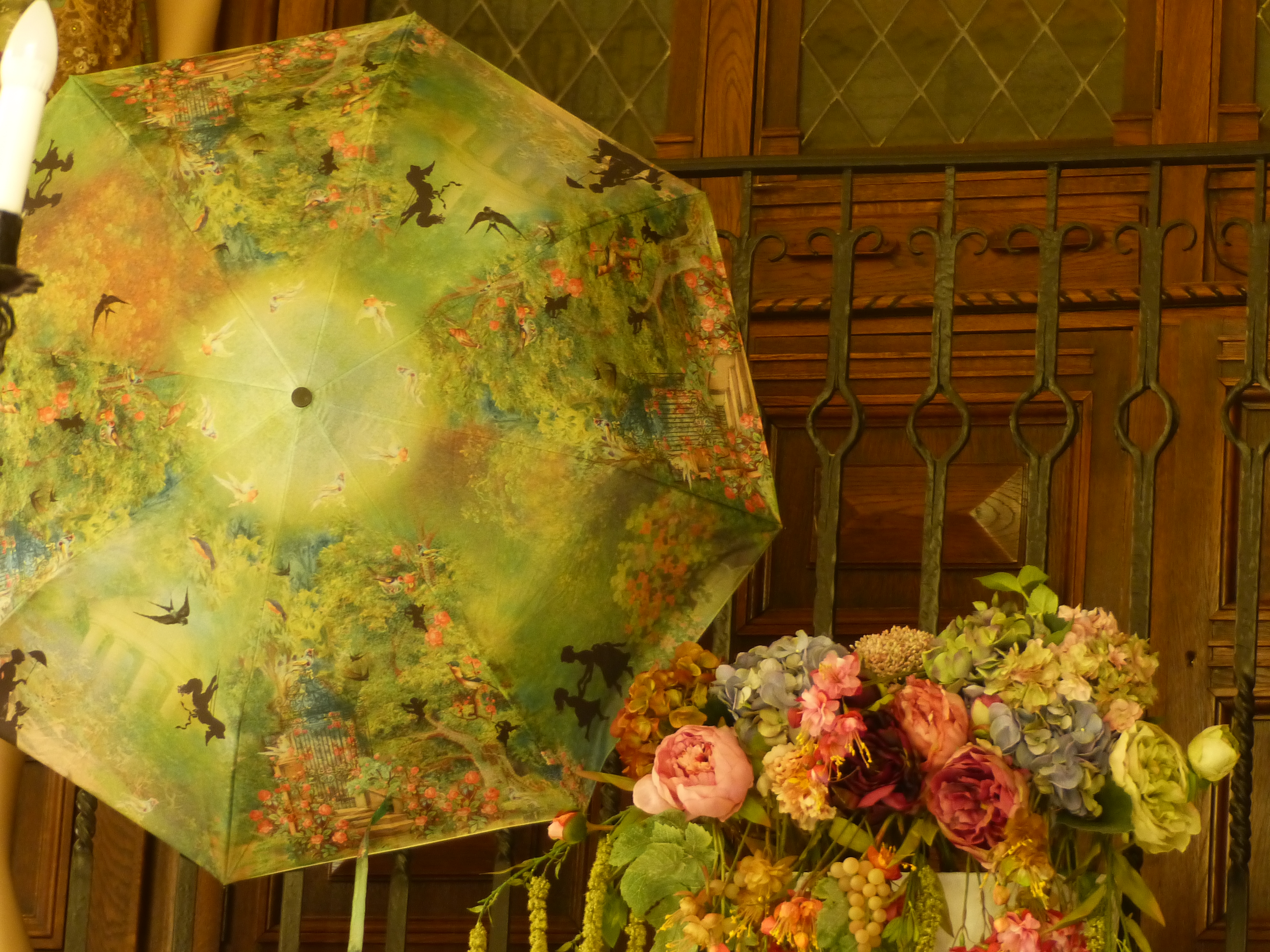
Shop decoration in Budapest, 2016

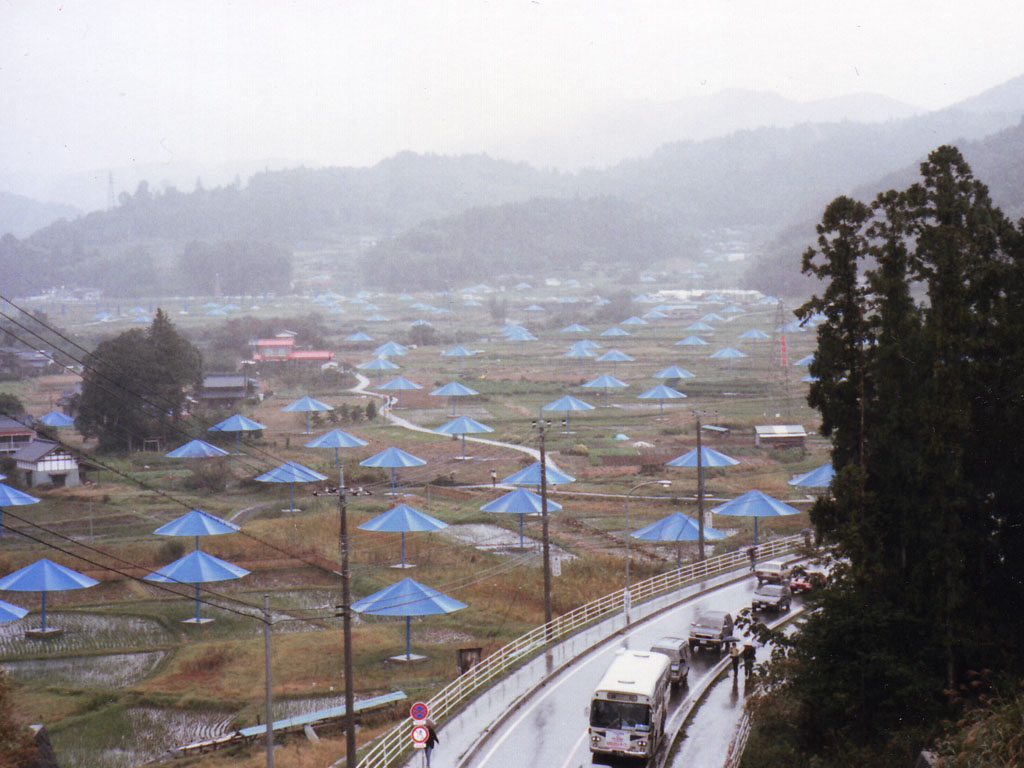
The Umbrellas (Christo and Jeanne-Claude), Japan and California, 1991. Two people were killed in separate incidents involving the work.

== See also ==
- Brumbrella
- Cocktail umbrella
- James Smith & Sons
- Oil-paper umbrella
- Royal Nine-Tiered Umbrella
- The Umbrella Man (song)
- Umbraculum
- Umbrella hat
- Umbrella marketing
- Umbrella stand
- Umbrella (song)

== Bibliography ==
- Fierro, Alfred (1996). Histoire et dictionnaire de Paris. Robert Laffont. ISBN 2-221--07862-4.
