= Duldig =

Duldig is a surname. Notable people with the surname include:

- Eva Duldig (born 1938), Austrian-born Australian and Dutch tennis player, author; daughter of Karl and Slawa
- Karl Duldig (1902–1986), Austrian-Australian sculptor; spouse of Slawa
- Lance Duldig (1922–1998), Australian cricketer
- Slawa Duldig (1902–1975), Polish-born Austrian-Australian inventor, artist, interior designer, and teacher; spouse of Karl
