= Tania de Jong =

Australian soprano and social entrepreneur

Tania de Jong AM
- Born: Tania Karen de Jong; Arnhem, Netherlands
- Origin: Melbourne, Victoria, Australia
- Occupations: Soprano; social entrepreneur
- Instrument: Vocals
- Years active: 1995–present
- Label: Pot Pourri
- Website: taniadejong.com

Tania Karen de Jong AM is an Australian soprano, social entrepreneur, businesswoman, motivational speaker, and event producer. She is the founder of Creative Innovation Global, Creative Universe, Creativity Australia, Dimension5, Music Theatre Australia, Pot-Pourri, and the Song Room, and co-founder of Mind Medicine Australia. De Jong was named one of the "100 Most Influential People in Psychedelics" globally by Psychedelic Invest in 2021.

== Early life ==
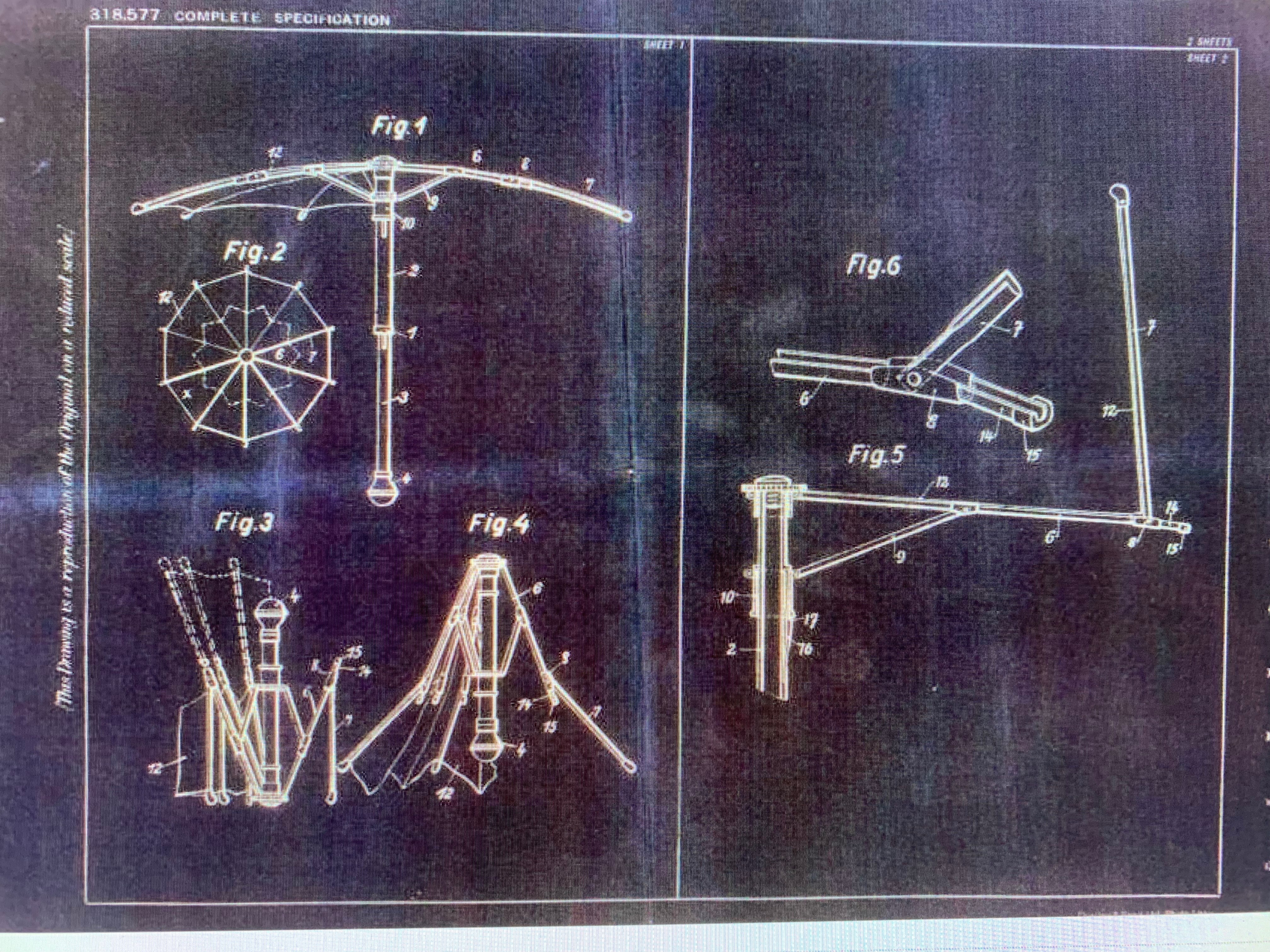
Her maternal grandmother Slawa Duldig kept her folding umbrella secret until she had secured a patent.

De Jong was born in Arnhem, the Netherlands, to her Dutch father and Austrian mother, both of whom escaped the Holocaust. Her parents met at the 1961 Maccabiah Games in Israel. De Jong's mother Eva de Jong-Duldig was a Dutch national tennis champion, a Federation Cup player for Australia, and a three-time quarter-finalist at the Wimbledon Championships. She also won gold medals at the 1957 Maccabiah Games and the 1961 Maccabiah Games in Israel.

De Jong's maternal grandfather, Karl Duldig, a Polish refugee living in Vienna who escaped the Holocaust with his family, ultimately landing in Australia, was a Vienna-trained sculptor. Her maternal grandmother, Slawa Duldig, also trained as a sculptor in Vienna, and notably invented a type of folding umbrella which she then patented. Her maternal grandparents’ former home in Melbourne's Malvern East now operates as a museum named the 'Duldig Studio'.

De Jong and her parents moved from the Netherlands to Melbourne, Australia, when de Jong was one year old.

== Academic life ==
De Jong graduated from the University of Melbourne with a Bachelor of Law (Honours). She then graduated from the Victorian College of the Arts with a Graduate Diploma in Opera and Music Theatre, and a Postgraduate Diploma in Music (Opera and Voice). She also attended college in the United States for a year, on a tennis scholarship.

== Career ==
=== Soprano ===
Aged 14, de Jong was advised by a friend not to undertake singing lessons. She nevertheless auditioned for the chorus of her school's performance of Oklahoma at age 17, and was cast in the lead role.

Tania won numerous singing competitions and was awarded various music scholarships to further her vocal studies including a Queen Elizabeth II Silver Jubilee Grant for advanced vocal training in San Francisco, U.S.A. with Campell Dickson Titus III and Scott Gilmore. She Studied singing and Italian with Antonio Moretti Pananti in Florence on an Italian Government Scholarship and Ian Potter Foundation Grant. She was awarded the Dame Roma Mitchell Winston Churchill Fellowship for overseas study with Eric Vietheer in London. She continued her vocal studies with a number of leading vocal teachers and coaches globally including acclaimed vocal coaches Peter Locke and David Harper in London and Australia, Australian conductor Richard Divall, singing teachers Anna Connolly, Gary May and Bettine McCaughan.

She obtained an Associate Diploma of Arts (Opera/Music Theatre) and Postgraduate Diploma (Opera/Voice), from the Victorian College of the Arts, University of Melbourne. She completed the Diploma of Acting and Movement for Singers at the National Theatre Drama School.

As a soprano, de Jong has performed as a soloist with a number of orchestras at the Victoria State Opera, and across 40 countries, including at the Sydney Opera House, Seoul Arts Centre, and Opera under the Stars. De Jong has collaborated with soprano Antoinette Halloran, singer Craig Macdonald, composer and pianist Joe Chindamo, and concert pianist Rebecca Chambers.

In May 2022, de Jong produced a musical named Driftwood, based on her mother's memoir of her family. It premiered in Melbourne.

=== Business career ===
De Jong is the Founder of Creative Innovation Global, Creative Universe (transformational leadership programs to inspire people to find their voice, and to bring greater wellbeing, engagement, and innovation into organisations), Creativity Australia, Dimension5, Music Theatre Australia, Pot-Pourri, and The Song Room (which has provided access to creative learning for 250,000 disadvantaged Australian children), and co-founder of Mind Medicine Australia. De Jong is known to encourage creative innovation whilst highlighting the interests of marginalised and disadvantaged Australians through her various enterprises.

=== Event producer ===
As an event producer, de Jong has hosted nine events focused on "Creative Innovation" in Melbourne, Australia. She is known for advocating for policy change and unity across the business, education, industry, community, and creative sectors during times of anticipated social disruption and change known otherwise as disruptive innovation.

== Discography ==
- 1995: Rhythm of Life – Pot-Pourri
- 1997: Something Familiar!, Something Peculiar – Pot-Pourri
- 1999: This is the Moment – Pot-Pourri
- 2001: Friends for Life – Pot-Pourri
- 2003: Chanson d'Amour – Pot-Pourri
- 2004: Soundsations – Dorje and Diva (Tania de Jong & Chris Walker)
- 2006: Nella Fantasia – Pot-Pourri
- 2012: Silver – Pot-Pourri
- 2015: Heaven on Earth – Tania de Jong
- 2017: Flying Free – Tania de Jong
- 2019: The Breezes at Dawn Have Secrets to Tell – Tania de Jong
- 2020: Solitary Harmony – Tania de Jong and Anthony Barnhill

== Achievements and awards ==
De Jong was appointed a Member of the Order of Australia in 2008 for service to the arts as a performer and entrepreneur and through the establishment and development of music and arts enrichment programs for schools and communities. She was named in The Australian Financial Review 100 Women of Influence awards in the Arts, Culture and Sport category in 2018. She was also named in Richtopia's list of Top 100 Most Influential Australian Entrepreneurs.

=== Awards ===
Order of Australia

- 1996: Churchill Fellowship
- 1998: "Outstanding Individual Contribution to Australian Culture" award
- 2000: Inducted into the AGSE Entrepreneurs Hall of Fame at Swinburne University
- 2001: Telstra Business Women's Awards
- 2005: Accessibility Award in The Melbourne Awards
- 2006: Ernst and Young Australian Social Entrepreneur of the Year Award
- 2007: Member of the Order of Australia
- 2009: Brainlink Woman of Achievement 2009.
- 2012: Top Social Innovators
- 2013: Top Social Innovators Creativity Australia
- 2013–2016: Anthill Top Social Innovations 'Creativity Australia and the With One Voice program
- 2016 Melbourne Award for contribution to the community – Creativity Australia
- 2016: Impact 25 Awards for the social sector's most influential people and positive impact
- 2017: Ethical Enterprise Award 2017
- 2018: Finalist, Third Sector Awards Social Entrepreneur of the Year
- 2018: Number 33 of the Top Most Influential Australian Entrepreneurs
- 2019: Named in the 100 Most Influential Women in Australia
- 2019: Award For Meritorious Service to the Community by The Hon Linda Dessau AC at the Victorian Multicultural Awards for Excellence
- 2021: "100 Most Influential People in Psychedelics" globally by Psychedelic Invest in 2021.
