= Australian home front during World War II =

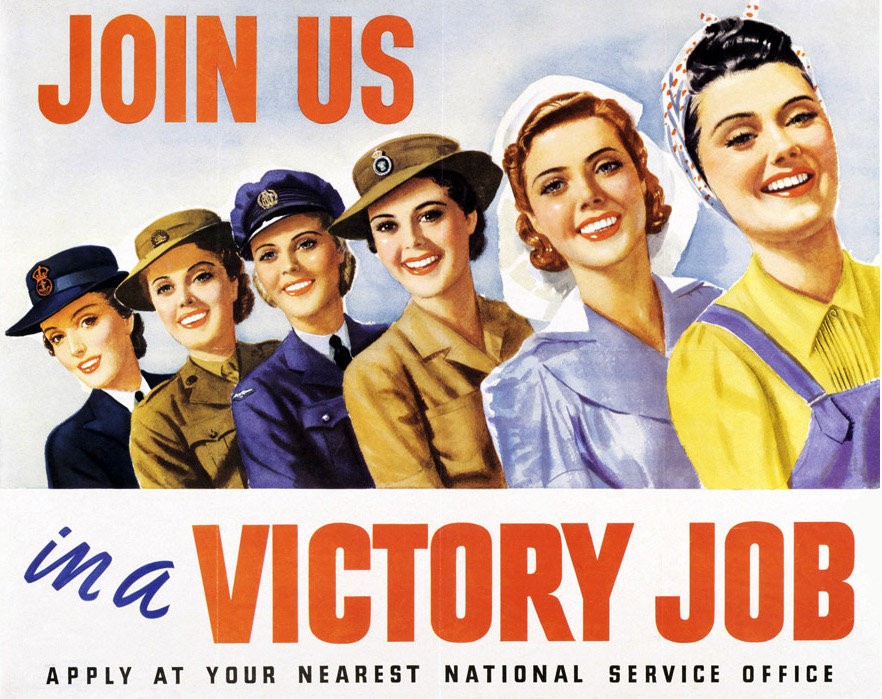
Australian women were encouraged to contribute to the war effort by joining one of the female branches of the armed forces or participating in the labour force

The Australian home front during World War II played a significant role in the Allied victory and led to permanent changes to Australian society.

During the war the Government of Australia greatly expanded its powers in order to better direct the war effort, and Australia's industrial and human resources were focused on supporting the Allied armed forces. While there were only a relatively small number of attacks on civilian targets, many Australians feared that the country would be invaded during the early years of the Pacific War. By 1942 the Americans under Douglas MacArthur were arriving in large numbers and used Australia as one base of operations against Japan. In foreign policy reliance on the United States replaced reliance on Britain.

== Menzies Government ==
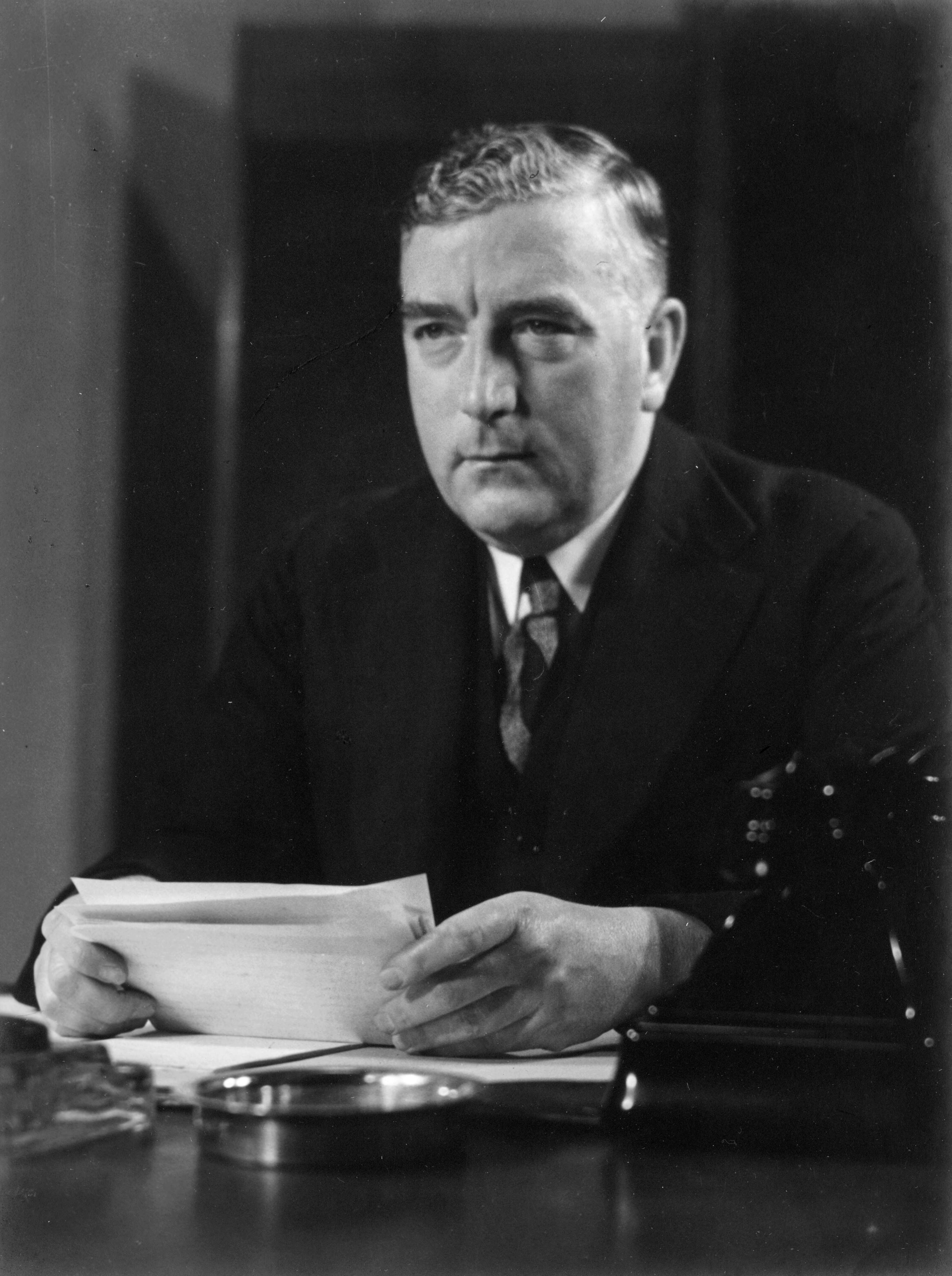
Robert Menzies broadcasting to the nation the news of the outbreak of war, 1939. (See quote to right).

Robert Menzies was sworn in as Prime Minister of Australia for the first time on 26 April 1939 following the death of Joseph Lyons. He led a minority United Australia Party government, after Country Party leader Earle Page refused to serve in a Coalition government led by Menzies. On 3 September 1939, Australia entered World War II, with Menzies making a declaration of a state of war in a national radio broadcast:

My fellow Australians. It is my melancholy duty to inform you, officially, that, in consequence of the persistence by Germany in her invasion of Poland, Great Britain has declared war upon her, and that, as a result, Australia is also at war.

Earle Page as leader of the Country Party and John Curtin as leader of the Labor Party both pledged support to the declaration, and Parliament passed the National Security Act 1939. A War Cabinet was formed after the declaration of war, initially composed of Prime Minister Menzies and five senior ministers (RG Casey, GA Street, Senator McLeay, HS Gullet and World War I Prime Minister Billy Hughes). When Page still refused to join a government under Menzies, he was replaced by Archie Cameron as leader of the Country Party on 13 September 1939, allowing the conservative parties to re-form a Coalition by March 1940.

The recruitment of a volunteer military force for service at home and abroad was announced, the Second Australian Imperial Force, and a citizen militia was organised for local defence. Menzies committed to provide 20,000 men to augment British forces in Europe, and on 15 November 1939 announced the reintroduction of conscription for home-defence service, effective 1 January 1940, freeing volunteers for overseas service.

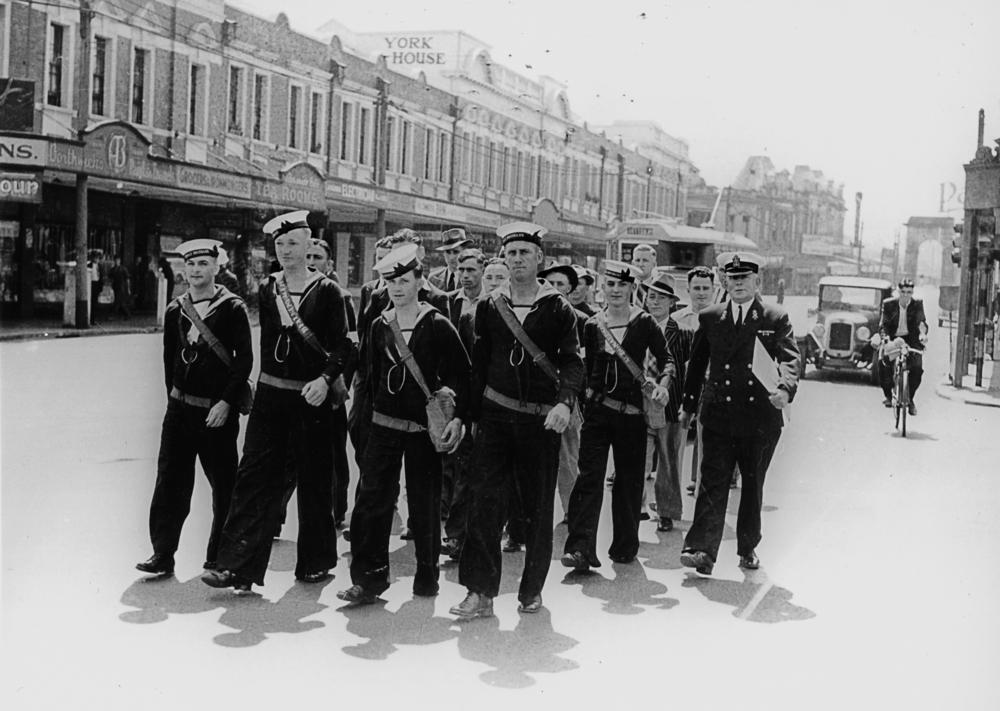
Naval recruits march along Melbourne Street in Brisbane, 1941

By June 1940, Germany had overrun the Low Countries, Norway and France leaving the British Empire standing alone against Germany. Menzies called for an 'all in' war effort and, with the support of Curtin, amended the National Security Act to extend government powers to tax, acquire property, control businesses and the labour force and allow for conscription of men for the "defence of Australia". Essington Lewis, the head of BHP was appointed Director-General of Munitions Supply to assist with mobilisation of national resources. However, in spring 1940, the coal miners under communist leadership struck for higher wages for 67 days. On 15 June 1940 the Menzies government suppressed 10 communist and fascist parties and organizations as subversive of the war effort. Police and army intelligence made hundreds of raids that night, and later broke up public meetings in the capital cities. In July 1940, the Menzies government imposed regulations under the National Security Act placing virtually all of Australia's newspapers, radio stations, and film industry under the direct control of the Director-General of Information. Newspaper publishers complained it was a blow struck at the freedom of the press. In January 1941, new regulations were directed against speaking disloyalty in public or even in private. The regulations were aimed at "whisperers" who undermined morale by spreading false rumours. During World War II many enemy aliens were interned in Australia under the National Security Act 1939.

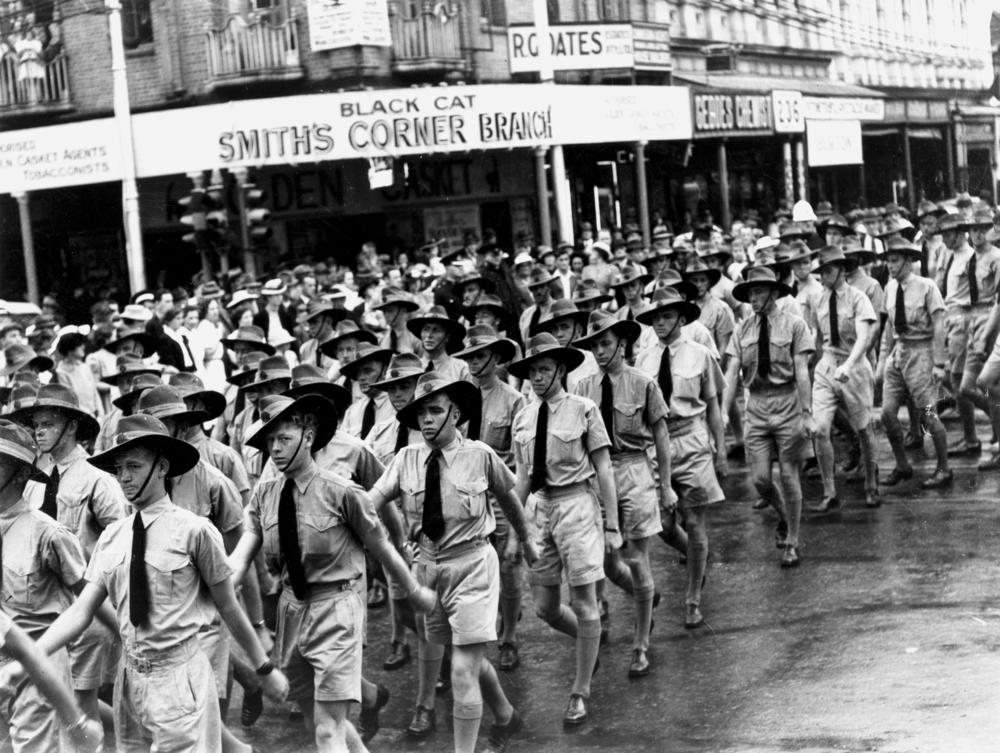
RAAF march in November 1941

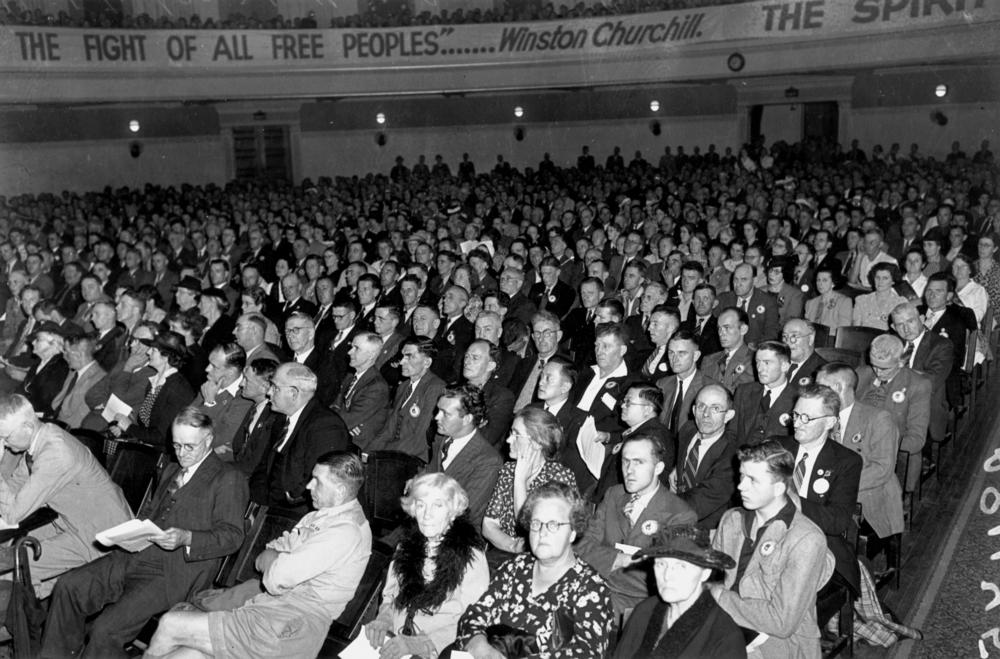
City Hall filled for Soviet Aid meeting, Brisbane, October 1941

Prisoners of war were also sent to Australia from other Allied countries as were their enemy aliens for internment in Australia. About 7,000 residents were interned by Australia, including more than 1,500 British nationals. A further 8,000 people were sent to Australia to be interned after being detained overseas by Australia's allies. At its peak in 1942, more than 12,000 people were interned in Australia.

Jews seeking to escape the Nazis such as two-year-old Eva Duldig and her parents Karl Duldig and Slawa Duldig were classified as enemy aliens upon their arrival due to their having arrived with German identity papers. The Australian government therefore interned the three of them for two years in isolated Tatura Internment Camp 3 D with 295 other internees, mostly families. There, armed soldiers manned watchtowers and scanned the camp that was bordered by a barbed wire fence with searchlights, and other armed soldiers patrolled the camp. Petitions to Australian politicians, stressing that they were Jewish refugees and therefore being unjustly imprisoned, had no effect.

With the 1940 election looming, a Royal Australian Air Force crash at Canberra Airport in August 1940 resulted in the death of the Chief of the General Staff and three senior ministers. The Labor Party meanwhile experienced a split along pro- and anti-Communist lines over policy towards the Soviet Union for its co-operation with Nazi Germany in the invasion of Poland. At the 1940 federal election in September, the UAP–Country Party Coalition and the Labor parties each won 36 seats and the Menzies Government was forced to rely on the support of two Independents to continue in office.

Menzies proposed an all party unity government to break the impasse, but the Labor Party refused to join. Curtin agreed instead to take a seat on a newly created Advisory War Council in October 1940. Cameron resigned as Country Party leader in October 1940, to be replaced by Arthur Fadden, who became Treasurer and Menzies unhappily conceded to allow Page back into his ministry.

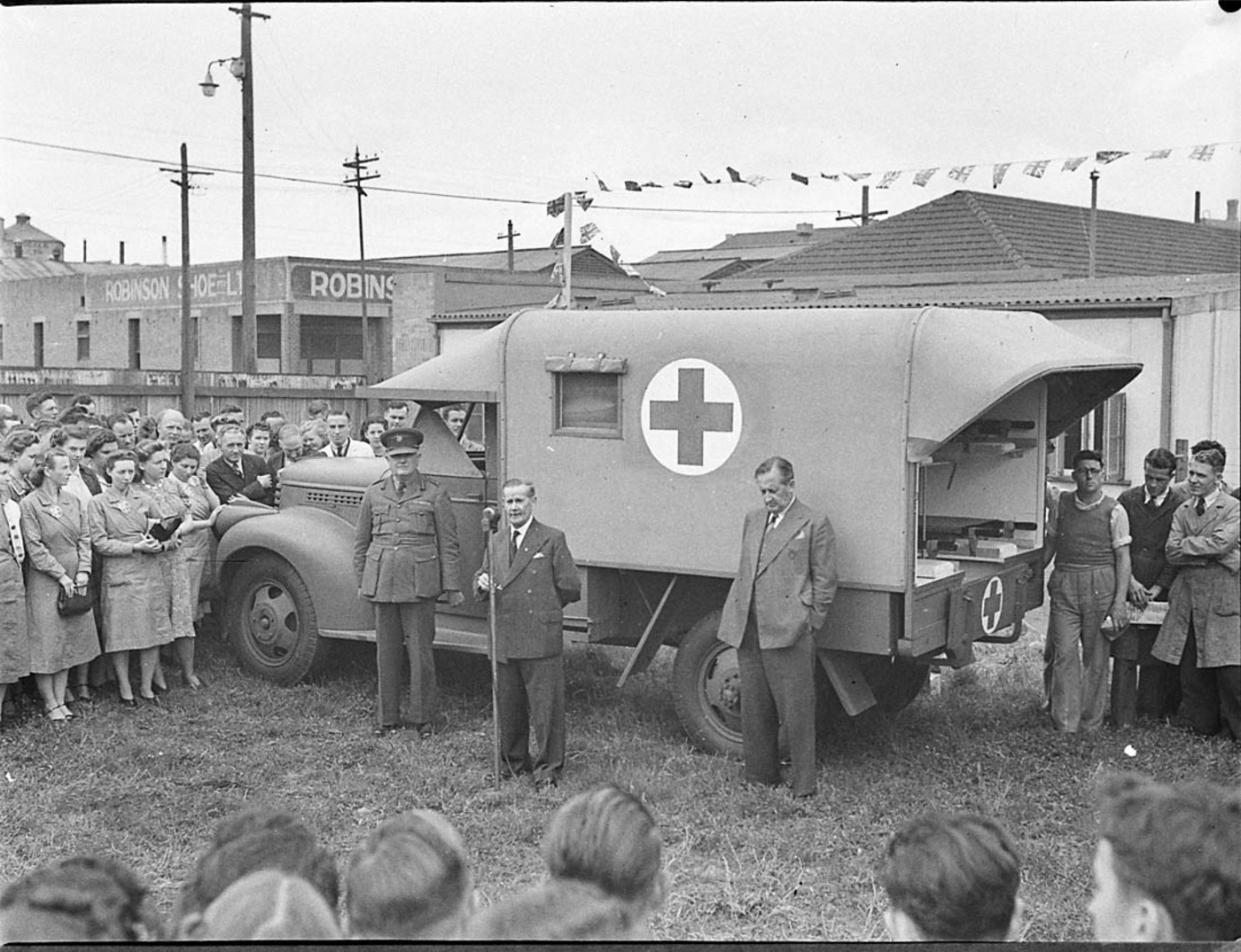
Presentation of ambulance, 1941

In January 1941, Menzies flew to Britain to discuss the weakness of Singapore's defences and sat with Winston Churchill's British War Cabinet. He was unable to achieve significant assurances for increased commitment to Singapore's defences, but undertook morale boosting excursions to war affected cities and factories. Returning to Australia via Lisbon and the United States in May, Menzies faced a war-time minority government under ever increasing strain. In Menzies's absence, Curtin had co-operated with Deputy Prime Minister Arthur Fadden in preparing Australia for the expected Pacific War. With the threat of Japan imminent and with the Australian army suffering badly in the Greek and Crete campaigns, Menzies re-organised his ministry and announced multiple multi-party committees to advise on war and economic policy. Government critics however called for an all-party government.

After Germany attacked the Soviet Union in June 1941, Australian trade unions supported the war. Australian Women's Army Service was formed in August 1941 as a non-medical support service for the military.

In August 1941, Cabinet decided that Menzies should travel back to Britain to represent Australia in the War Cabinet, but this time the Labor caucus refused to support the plan. Menzies announced to his Cabinet that he thought he should resign and advise the Governor-General to invite Curtin to form Government. The Cabinet instead insisted he approach Curtin again to form a war cabinet. Unable to secure Curtin's support, and with an unworkable parliamentary majority, Menzies resigned as prime minister and leader of the UAP on 29 August 1941. He was succeeded as prime minister by Fadden, the leader of the Country Party, who held office for a month. Billy Hughes, then aged 79, replaced Menzies as leader of the UAP. The two independents crossed the floor, bringing down the Coalition government, and enabling Labor under Curtin to form a minority government.

== Curtin government ==
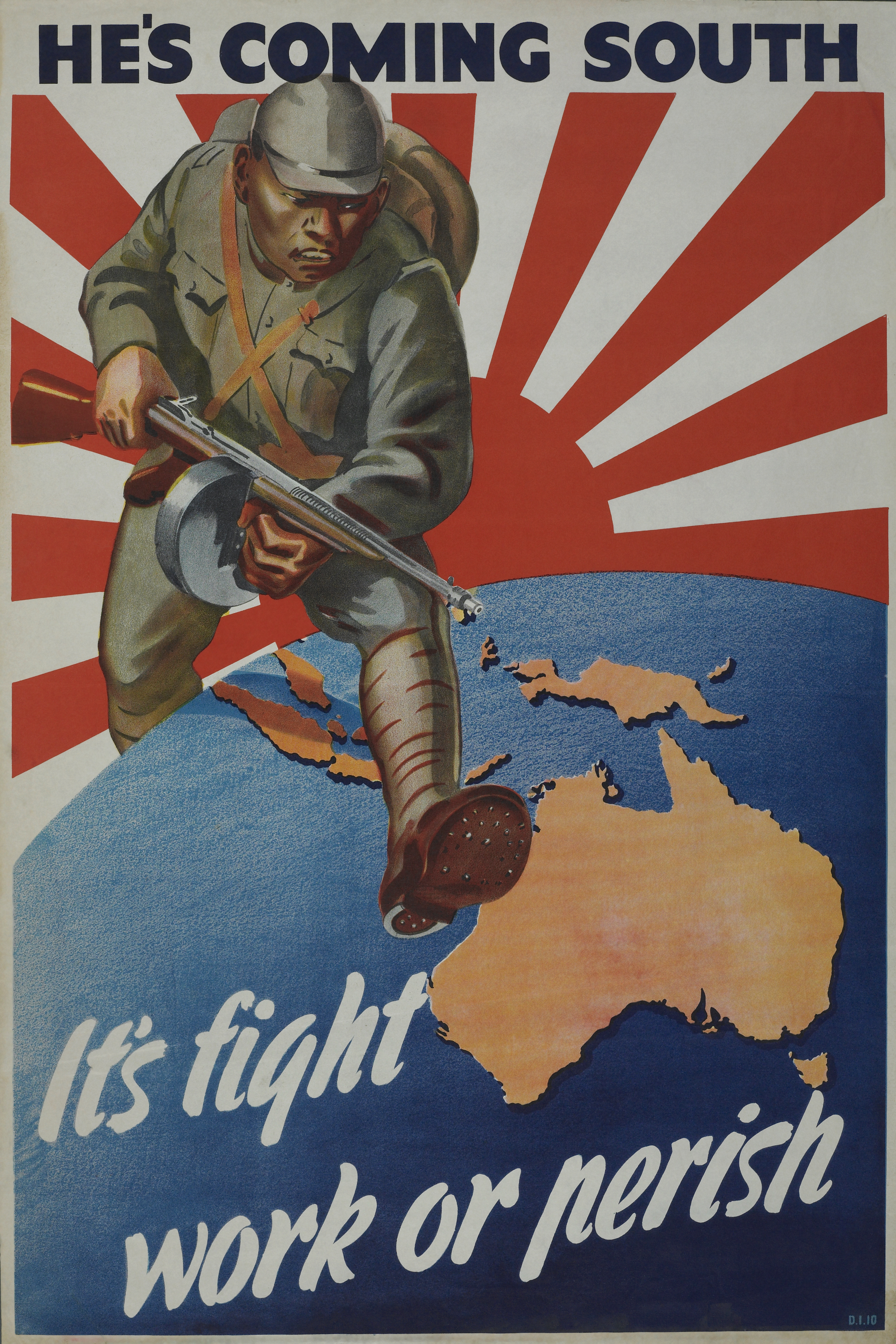
1942 Australian propaganda poster. Australia feared invasion by Imperial Japan following the Fall of Singapore.

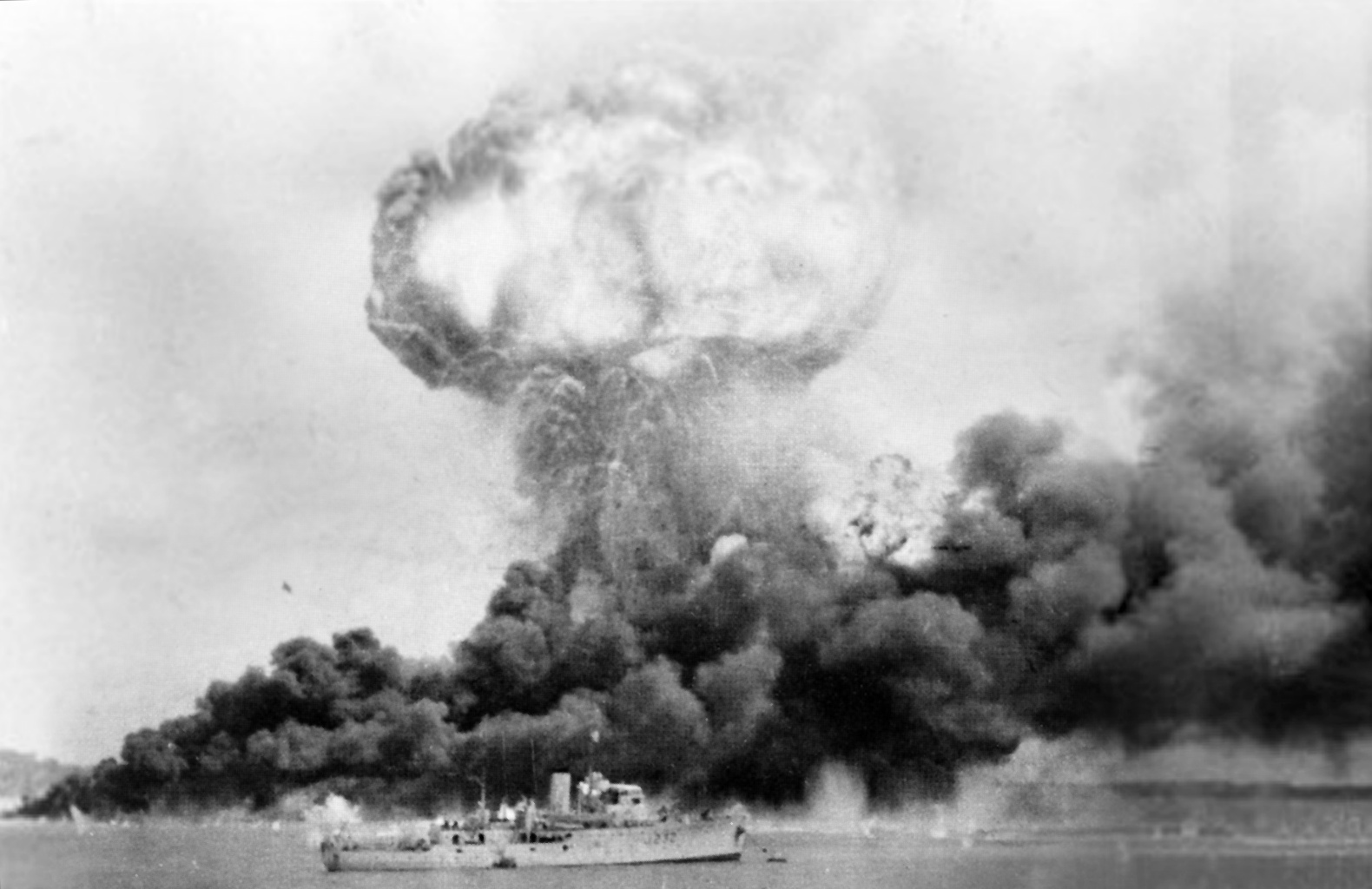
The Bombing of Darwin, 19 February 1942.

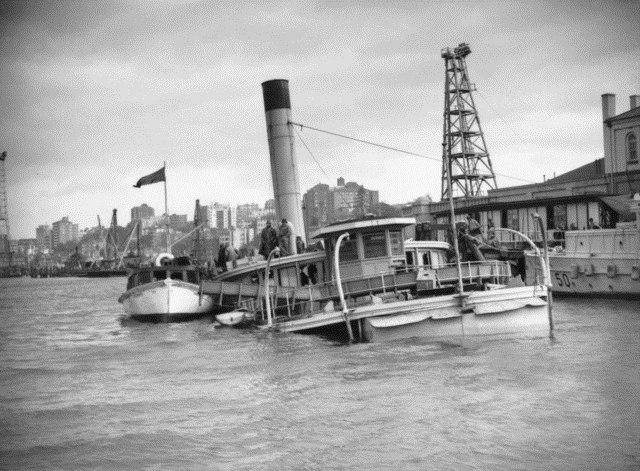
HMAS Kuttabul, sunk by a Japanese midget submarine attack on Sydney Harbour, 1942.

Eight weeks after the formation of the Curtin government, on 7 December 1941 (eastern Australia time), Japan attacked Pearl Harbor, the US naval base in Hawaii. On 10 December 1941, the British battleship HMS Prince of Wales and battlecruiser HMS Repulse sent to defend Singapore were sunk by Japan. British Malaya quickly collapsed, shocking the Australian population. British, Indian and Australian troops made a disorganised last stand at Singapore, before surrendering on 15 February 1942. On 27 December 1941, Curtin demanded reinforcements from Churchill, and published an historic announcement:

"The Australian Government...regards the Pacific struggle as primarily one in which the United States and Australia must have the fullest say in the direction of the democracies' fighting plan. Without inhibitions of any kind, I make it clear that Australia looks to America, free of any pangs as to our traditional links or kinship with the United Kingdom."

Curtin predicted that the "battle for Australia" would now follow. Australia was ill-prepared for an attack, lacking armaments, modern fighter aircraft, heavy bombers, and aircraft carriers. Most of Australia's best forces were committed to fight against Hitler in the Middle East. On 19 February, Darwin suffered a devastating air raid, the first time the Australian mainland had ever been attacked by enemy forces. Over the following 19 months, Australia was attacked from the air almost 100 times. Most elements of the Australian I Corps, including the 6th and 7th Divisions, returned to Australia in early 1942 to counter the perceived Japanese threat to Australia. All RAN's ships in the Mediterranean were also withdrawn to the Pacific but most RAAF units in the Middle East remained in the theatre.

U.S. President Franklin Roosevelt ordered his commander in the Philippines, General Douglas MacArthur, to formulate a Pacific defence plan with Australia in March 1942. Curtin agreed to place Australian forces under the command of General MacArthur, who became "Supreme Commander of the South West Pacific". Curtin had thus presided over a fundamental shift in Australia's foreign policy. MacArthur moved his headquarters to Melbourne in March 1942 and American troops began massing in Australia. In late May 1942, Japanese midget submarines sank an accommodation vessel in a daring raid on Sydney Harbour. On 8 June 1942, two Japanese submarines briefly shelled Sydney's eastern suburbs and the city of Newcastle.

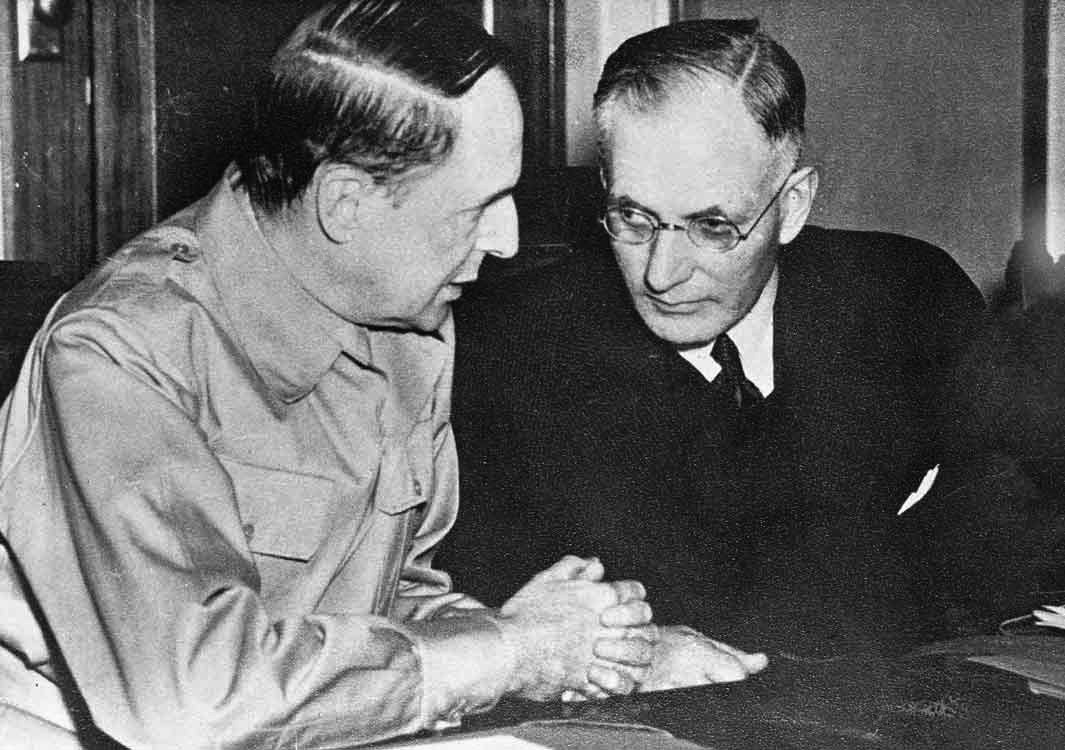
U.S. General Douglas MacArthur, Commander of Allied forces in the Pacific, with Prime Minister Curtin

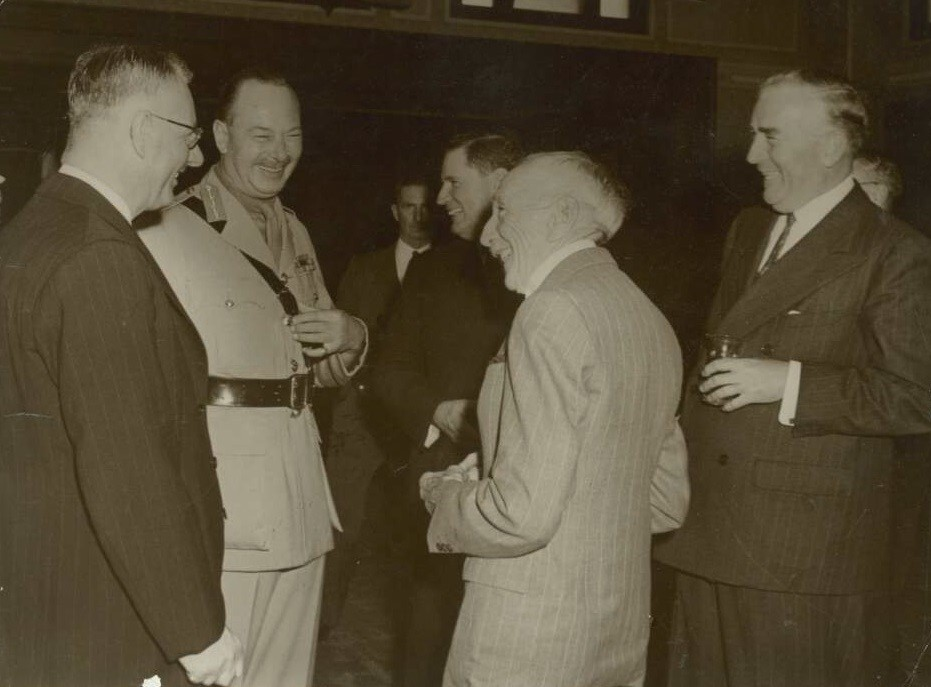
Prime Ministers Curtin, Fadden, Hughes, Menzies and Governor-General The Duke of Gloucester in 1945.

In an effort to isolate Australia, the Japanese planned a seaborne invasion of Port Moresby, in the Australian Territory of New Guinea. In May 1942, the U.S. Navy engaged the Japanese in the Battle of the Coral Sea and halted the attack. The Battle of Midway in June effectively defeated the Japanese navy and the Japanese army launched a land assault on Port Moresby from the north.

The Australian Women's Land Army was formed on 27 July 1942 under the jurisdiction of the Director General of Manpower to combat rising labour shortages in the farming sector.

The Battle of Buna-Gona, between November 1942 and January 1943, set the tone for the bitter final stages of the New Guinea campaign, which persisted into 1945. MacArthur to a certain extent excluded Australian forces from the main push north into the Philippines and Japan. It was left to Australia to lead amphibious assaults against Japanese bases in Borneo.

Curtin went on to lead federal Labor to its greatest win with two thirds of seats in the House of Representatives and over 58% of the two-party preferred vote at the 1943 federal election in August. Labor won 49 seats to 12 United Australia Party, 7 Country Party, 3 Country National Party (Queensland), 1 Queensland Country Party, 1 Liberal Country Party (Victoria) and 1 Independent. The Labor Party also won all 19 of the seats contested for the Senate.

Concerned to maintain British commitment to the defence of Australia, Prime Minister Curtin announced in November 1943 that Prince Henry, Duke of Gloucester, the brother of King George VI, was to be appointed Governor-General of Australia. He arrived in Australia to take up his post in January 1945. Curtin hoped this might influence the British to despatch men and equipment to the Pacific, and the appointment reaffirmed the important role of the Crown to Australia at that time.

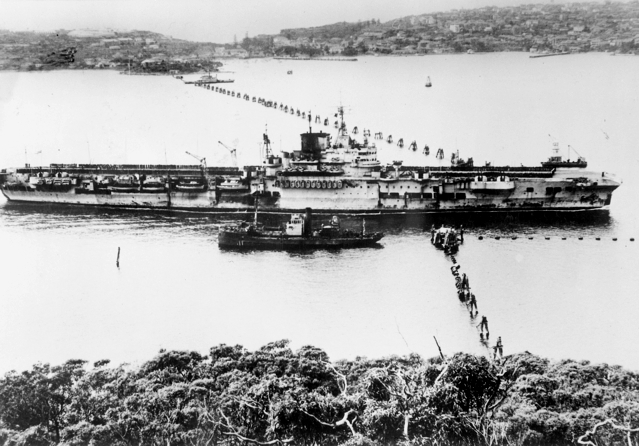
The British aircraft carrier HMS Formidable passing through the anti-submarine boom in Port Jackson (Sydney Harbour) in 1945

As the end of the war approached, Curtin sought to firm up Australian influence in the South Pacific following the war but also sought to ensure a continuing role for the British Empire, calling Australia "the bastion of British institutions, the British way of life and the system of democratic government in the Southern World". In April 1944, Curtin held talks on postwar planning with President Franklin Roosevelt of the US and with Prime Minister Winston Churchill of Britain and gained agreement for the Australian economy to begin transitioning from military to post-war economy. He returned to Australia and campaigned for an unsuccessful 1944 referendum to extend federal government power over employment, monopolies, Aboriginal people, health and railway gauges.

Prime Minister Curtin suffered from ill health from the strains of office. He suffered a major heart attack in November 1944. Facing the newly formed Liberal Party of Australia opposition led by Robert Menzies, Curtin struggled with exhaustion and a heavy work load – excusing himself from Parliamentary question time and unable to concentrate on the large number of parliamentary bills being drafted dealing with the coming peace. Curtin returned to hospital in April with lung congestion. With Deputy Prime Minister Frank Forde in the United States and Ben Chifley serving as acting prime minister, it was Chifley who announced the end of the war in Europe on 9 May 1945.

When Curtin died towards the end of the Second World War in July 1945, Forde served as prime minister from 6–13 July, before the party elected Ben Chifley as Curtin's successor. Following his 1945 election as leader of the Labor Party, Chifley, a former railway engine driver, became Australia's 16th prime minister on 13 July 1945. The Second World War ended with the defeat of Japan in the Pacific just four weeks later. Curtin is widely regarded as one of the country's greatest prime ministers. General MacArthur said that Curtin was "one of the greatest of the wartime statesmen".

== Air raids ==
The Japanese air force made 97 air raids against Australia over a 19-month period starting with Darwin in February 1942 until 1943. The Darwin area was hit 64 times. Horn Island was struck 9 times, Broome and Exmouth Gulf 4 times, Townsville and Millingimbi three times, Port Hedland and Wyndham twice and Derby, Drysdale, Katherine, Mossman, Onslow, and Port Patterson once.

== Military production ==
Production of selected weapons for the Australian Army

Weapon	1939	1940	1941	1942	1943	1944	1945	Wartime total
Lee–Enfield .303 rifle	n/a	20 942	79 858	101 600	145 900	47 060	15 690	411 050
Vickers MMG	n/a	846	1 971	33 56	2 224	1 993	1 046	11 436
Bren LMG			1 077	5 615	6 812	3 152	778	17 434
2 pounder AT gun			576	924	80			1 580
6 pounder AT gun				192	708			900
17 pounder AT gun								128
25 pounder field gun			193	877	313	552		1 905
25 pounder field gun (short)					112	75	32	219
Bofors 40 mm AA gun				11	186	75	18	290
3.7 inch AA gun		40	138	185	131	3		497
Owen SMG			102	15 096	21 555	8 710		45 463
Austen SMG				2 283	16 565	1 057		19 905
2-inch mortar					1 283	717		2 000
3-inch mortar			1 444	932	837	93		3 006
4.2 inch mortar				1	70	229		300
Machine-gun carrier			1 544	2 251	1 084	104		4 983
Sentinel tank				25	40			65
Rover Light Armoured Car								238
Dingo scout car								245

Australian aircraft production during World War II

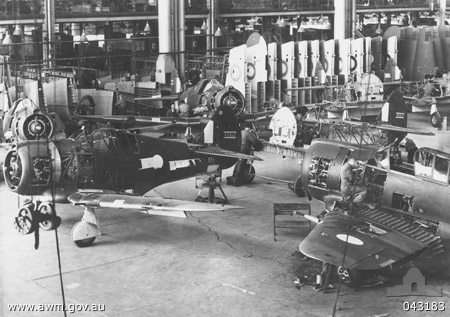
Boomerang fighters under construction at Commonwealth Aircraft Corporation's Fishermans Bend factory

Aircraft	1939–40	1940–41	1941–42	1942–43	1943–44	1944–45	Wartime total
Beaufort			76	285	312	27	700
Beaufighter					3	281	329
Wirraway	75	225	320		30	60	717
Wackett		13	187				200
Boomerang				105	102	43	250
Mustang						4	18
Tiger Moth		8	453	508	66	35	1 070
Dragon				87			87
Mosquito					6	82	115

== See also ==
- Australian home front during World War I
- Australia–United States relations#World War II
- Australian women during World War II
- Australian Women's Army Service
- Australian Women's Land Army
- Home front during World War II
- Military history of Australia during World War II
- Military history of the British Commonwealth in the Second World War
- Military production during World War II
- Victory garden
- Volunteer Air Observer Corp
