= Alex Ogilvy =

Australian rules footballer (1901–1984)

Personal information
- Full name: Alexander Wills Ogilvy
- Born: 26 December 1901; Edinburgh, Scotland
- Died: 18 November 1984 (aged 82); Malvern East, Victoria
- Original team: Melbourne Juniors
- Height: 171 cm (5 ft 7 in)
- Weight: 68 kg (150 lb)

Playing career^{1}
Years	Club	Games (Goals)
1921	Melbourne	4 (0)
- ^{1} Playing statistics correct to the end of 1921.

Alexander Wills Ogilvy (26 December 1901 – 18 November 1984) was an Australian rules footballer who played for the Melbourne Football Club in the Victorian Football League (VFL).
