= Brüder Wüster =

Brüder Wüster is an Austrian steel manufacturer and formerly umbrella manufacturer. The company is based in Waasen, in Neumarkt an der Ybbs in Lower Austria.

The company was operated by the brothers Wüster and was primarily active in the steel and metal manufacturing business. In 1897 they also set up an electric power station in Ybbs.

Wüster became one of the leading producers in Austria for umbrella frames. In 1928, the student Slawa Horowitz from the Academy of Fine Arts Vienna developed a new practical, foldable type of umbrella, for which she received a patent in 1929. It was contracted by Basch & Braun who commissioned Brüder Wüster to produce this umbrella, called "Flirt", in large numbers. The German associate to produce them was Kortenbach & Rauh.

A street in the community of Pitten, Lower Austria is named in their honour.
