= Karl Duldig =

Austrian-born Australian sculptor (1902–1986)

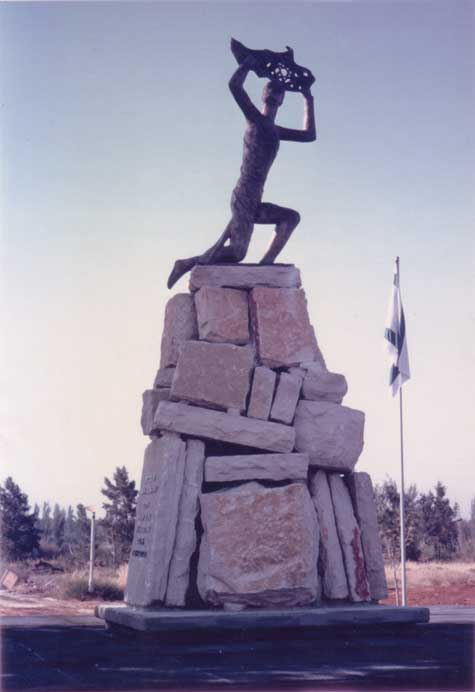
- Dawn (1968), memorial for sports men and women who had died in the Holocaust, Tel Aviv
- Born: Karol Duldig; 29 December 1902; Przemyśl, Galicia, Austria-Hungary
- Died: 11 August 1986 (aged 83); Malvern, Victoria, Australia
- Resting place: Chevra Kadisha cemetery, Springvale, Victoria, Australia
- Known for: Sculptor, table tennis champion, competitor in tennis and football.
- Style: Modernist
- Spouse: Slawa Horowitz Duldig
- Children: Eva Duldig, tennis player
- Relatives: Tania de Jong (granddaughter)

Karl (Karol) Duldig (29 December 1902 – 11 August 1986) was a Jewish sculptor. Born in Poland, he and his family fled Vienna in 1938 following the annexation of Austria by Nazi Germany, eventually settling in Australia. As a sculptor, he was instrumental in introducing the Modernist style to an Australian audience, won the 1956 Victorian Sculptor of the Year Award, and had an annual lecture established in his name by the National Gallery of Victoria.

== Early years ==
Duldig was born in Przemyśl, Galicia, Poland (then part of the Austro-Hungarian Empire). His parents were Marcus Duldig and Eidla (Eydl) Nebenzahl. In 1914 his family moved to Vienna. He studied sculpture under Anton Hanak at the Kunstgewerbeschule from 1921 until 1925. He then studied sculpture at the Academy of Fine Arts Vienna from 1925 until 1929. From 1930 to 1933 he undertook Masters studies with Professor Josef Müller at the Academy.

In 1923, he was Austrian national champion in table tennis. He also played football as a goalkeeper for Hakoah Vienna, and was one of Austria's top tennis players.

In 1931, he married artist and inventor Slawa Horowitz, who had patented an improved compact folding umbrella in 1929. Their only child, Eva Duldig, was born in 1938. Eva became a champion Australian tennis player who played in Wimbledon, the French Championships, the Australian Open, and at the Maccabiah Games in Israel where she won two gold medals, and was founder of the present-day Duldig Studio, an artists' house museum in Melbourne, Australia.

== Switzerland and Singapore; Fleeing Nazi Europe ==
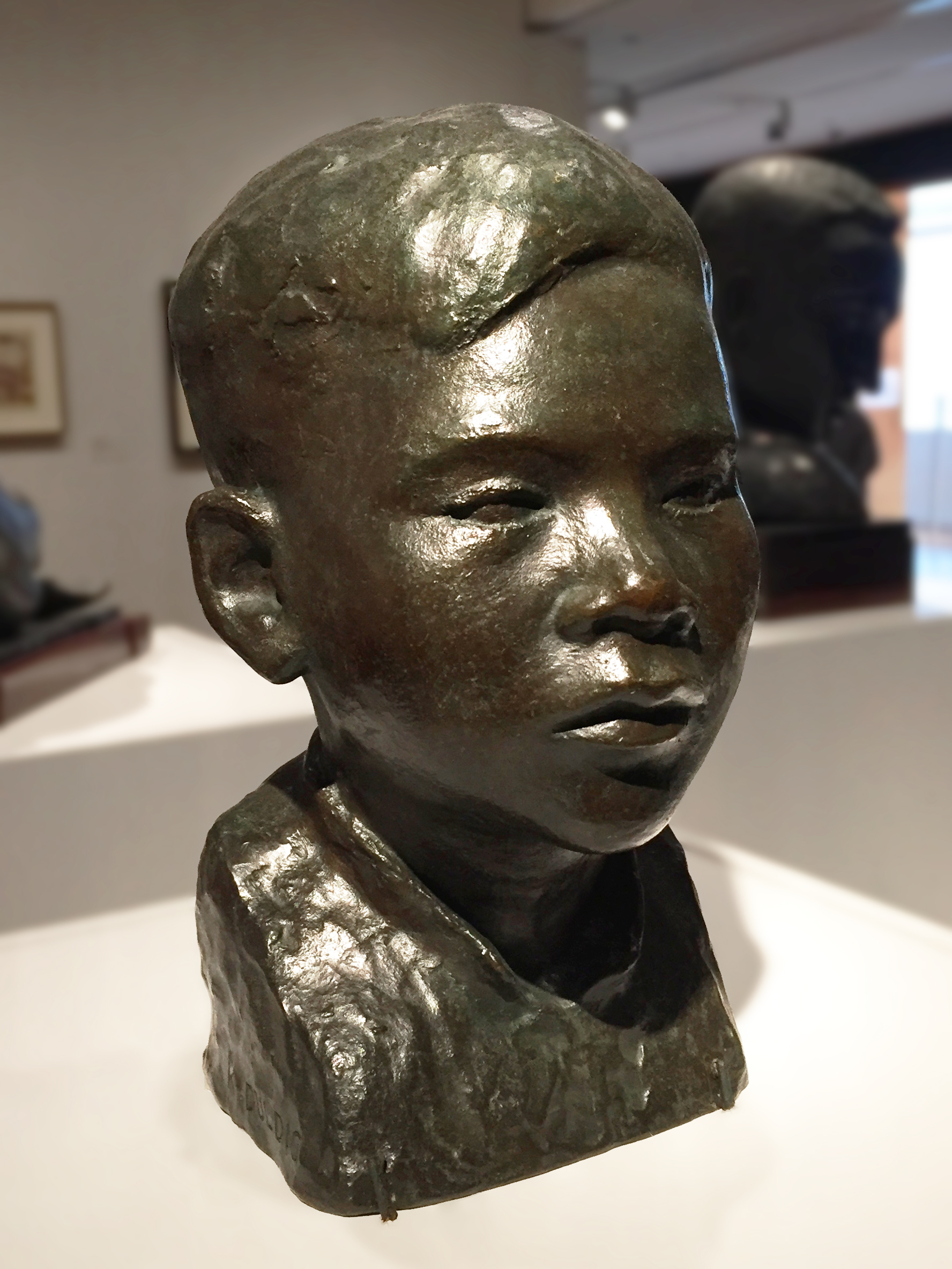
Malay Boy (1939) by Karl Duldig, National Gallery Singapore

As the Nazis entered Austria, the family left first for Switzerland. He first travelled to Switzerland without his wife and child, on a temporary visa to play in a tennis tournament, and later that year convinced an official to allow his family to "visit" him there in Zurich, thereby staying a step ahead of the Holocaust. The family was only allowed to stay in Switzerland for a short time.

The family then left for Singapore by boat in April 1939, where initially he and Slawa ran an art school and he restored paintings, and completed commissions for the Sultan of Johor and Aw Boon Haw. In Singapore, however, six months after their arrival the British arrested them, because they had German identity papers. Austria had been annexed by Germany in March 1938 in the Anschluss, and therefore the family and all other Austrians by law had become citizens of the German Reich. The British colonial government classified them as "citizens of an enemy country", and they were deported by boat from Singapore to Australia in September 1940.

== Australia; enemy alien, sculptor ==
They were deported by boat from Singapore to Australia in September 1940. In Australia, in the wake of the outbreak of World War II, he, Slawa, and two-year-old Eva were classified as enemy aliens upon their arrival due to their having arrived with German identity papers. The Australian government therefore interned the three of them for two years, from 1940 to 1942, in isolated Tatura Internment Camp 3 D with 295 other internees, mostly families. The internment camp was located near Shepparton, in the northern part of the state of Victoria. There, armed soldiers manned watchtowers and scanned the camp that was bordered by a barbed wire fence with searchlights, and other armed soldiers patrolled the camp. Petitions to Australian politicians, stressing that they were Jewish refugees and therefore being unjustly imprisoned, had no effect. The family later lived in St Kilda and East Malvern, and became Australian citizens.

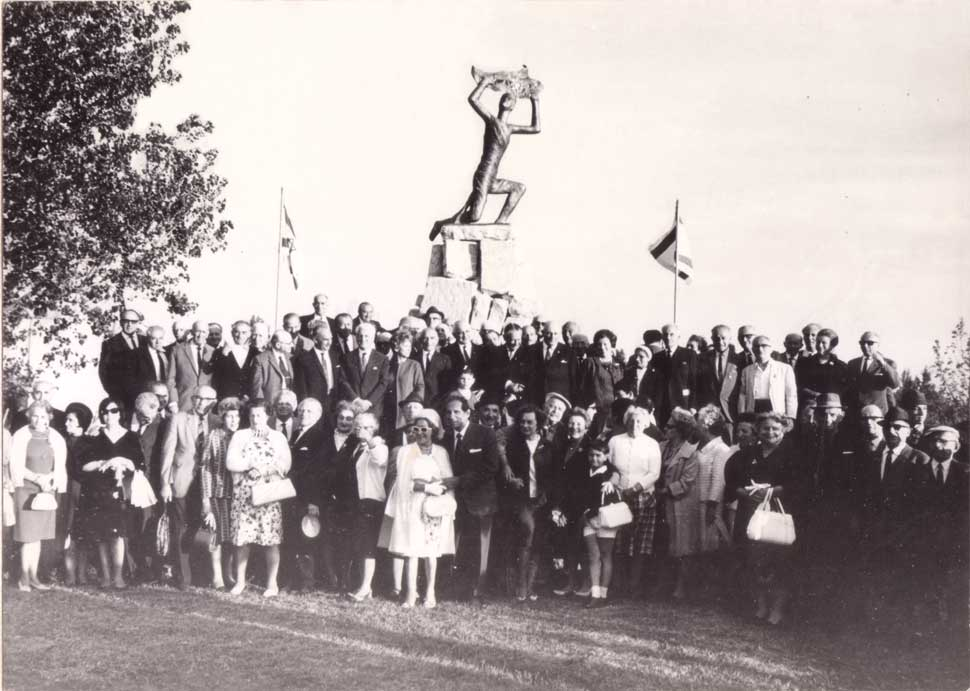
Unveiling of Dawn

From 1945 to 1967, Duldig was art master at Mentone Grammar School. As a sculptor, he exhibited at Victorian Sculptors' Society, and was featured in the 1956 Olympic Games art festival, the Mildura Sculpture Triennials, and the Adelaide Festival of Arts. Works of his are displayed in the City of Caulfield, Melbourne General Cemetery War Memorial, Council House, the Australian National Gallery, and the Australian War Memorial. His works are also shown at the National Gallery of Victoria, the McClelland Gallery and Sculpture Park, and the Newcastle Region Art Gallery.

He often used a Modernist style. In 1956 Duldig won the Victorian Sculptor of the Year Award. In 1968, his bronze statue in memory of fallen sportspeople who were killed in the Holocaust was unveiled in Tel Aviv, Israel.

After his wife died in 1975, in 1983 he married Rosia Ida Dorin.

In 1986, an annual lecture was established in his name by the National Gallery of Victoria.

In 2002, his daughter Eva founded the Duldig Studio in East Malvern, a not-for-profit public museum and art gallery, in her former family home. It displays the works of her parents.

== Family ==
Karl and Slawa's daughter Eva became a tennis player, and competed at the Wimbledon Championships in 1961 for Australia. She also played at Wimbledon in 1962 and 1963 for the Netherlands, and competed in the Australian Open, French Championships, Fed Cup, and in the Maccabiah Games in Israel where she won two gold medals. Eva published a memoir in 2017, Driftwood: Escape and Survival Through Art about her family's experiences. In 2017, it received a Victorian Community History Award and in 2018, it was longlisted for the Dobbie Award. Her memoir was made into a musical in 2022, entitled Driftwood – The Musical, directed by Wesley Enoch. Her daughter Tania wrote some of the lyrics. Australian Broadcasting Corporation wrote that the musical "is a remarkable story". The Australian Jewish News wrote: "there's no shortage of drama, heartache and lucky escape." Limelight wrote that the musical was "sincere to a fault." The Age wrote: "Director Gary Abrahams keeps the story's emotional core vivid and convincing and Anthony Barnhill's score suits the material well. The singing is excellent... this show has heart."

Karl's granddaughter, Tania de Jong, born in 1964, is an Australian soprano, social entrepreneur, and businesswoman. In 1965, after Tania's birth, the family returned to Melbourne, and after she gave birth to two more children Duldig found it challenging to maintain her tennis. After her tennis career, she worked as a recreation consultant, a writer, and a designer of children's play spaces.

In 2022, Karl's great-granddaughters Andrea and Emma de Jong ran in the 2022 Maccabiah Games, and Emma won the 800 metres and 1,500-metre run as a junior.

== See also ==
- List of honours dedicated to Raoul Wallenberg
