= Tatura =

- Town
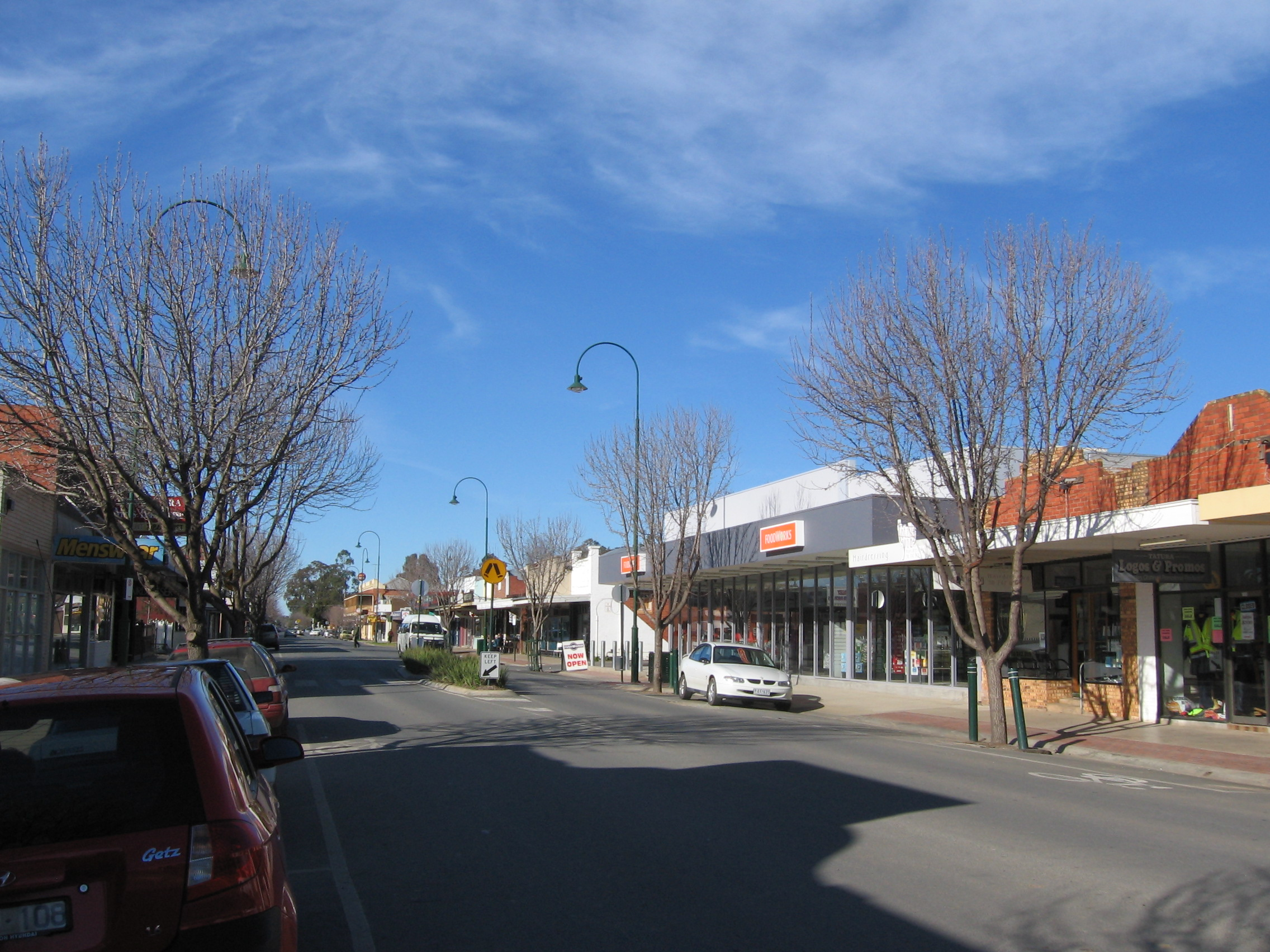
- Main street

- Interactive map of Tatura
- Coordinates: 36°26′0″S 145°14′0″E
- Country: Australia
- State: Victoria
- Region: Hume
- LGA: City of Greater Shepparton
- Location: 167 km (104 mi) N of Melbourne; 18 km (11 mi) W of Shepparton

Government
  - State electorate: Shepparton
  - Federal division: Nicholls
- Elevation: 114 m (374 ft)

Population
  - Total: 4,955 (2021 census)
- Postcode: 3616
- Mean max temp: 21.5 °C (70.7 °F)
- Mean min temp: 8.5 °C (47.3 °F)
- Annual rainfall: 482.4 mm (18.99 in)

Tatura is a town in the Goulburn Valley region of Victoria, Australia, and is situated within the City of Greater Shepparton local government area, 167 kilometres (104 mi) north of the state capital (Melbourne) and 18 kilometres (11 mi) west of the regional centre of Shepparton. At the 2021 census, Tatura had a population of 4,955.

During World War II, several internment camps were set up around Tatura by the Australian government. Four of these were for "enemy alien" civilians, and three were for prisoners of war. Between 1940 and 1947, there were 10,000 to 13,000 people in the internment camps at different times.

With a large corporate and manufacturing presence within the town, Tatura is a major employer within the Goulburn Valley. Attractions include the Cussen Park wetlands, the Wartime Camps, and Irrigation Museum. The name of the town is an Aboriginal word meaning "small lagoon".

== History ==
The post office opened on 1 February 1875. The Tatura Magistrates' Court closed on 1 January 1990.

== World War II internment camps ==
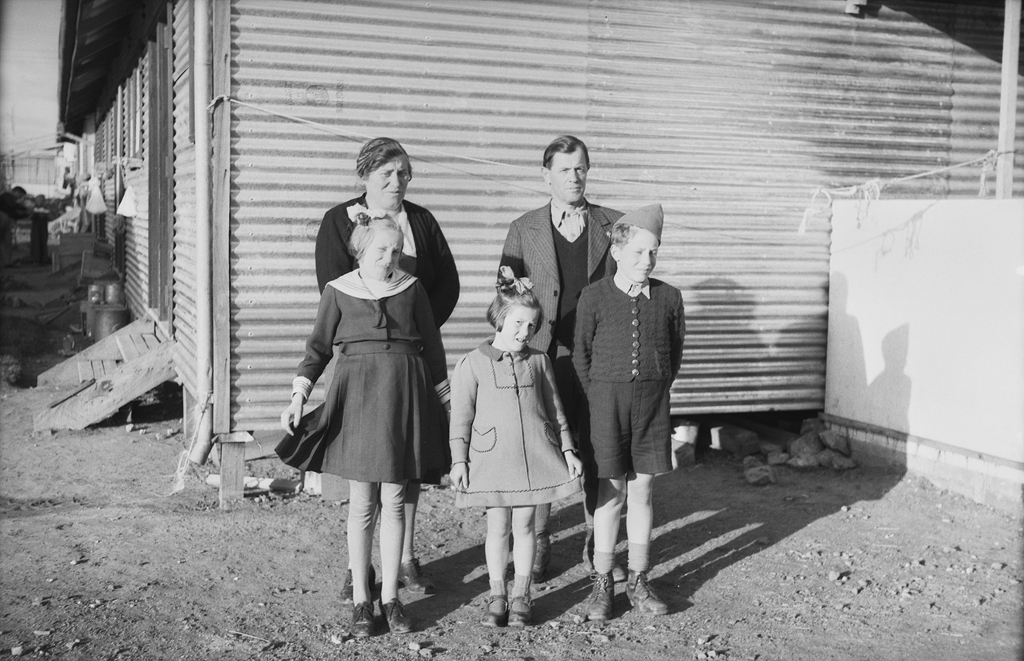
Family held at Tatura Internment Camp 3, in 1943

Several internment camps were set up around Tatura, Rushworth, and Murchison (Dhurringile) by the Australian government during World War II. Four of these were for "enemy alien" civilians, and three were for prisoners of war. Australian law in 1939 designated people "enemy aliens" if they were Germans or were Australians who had been born in Germany; later, it covered Italians and Japanese as well. The majority of the "enemy aliens" were refugees fleeing the Nazis. Between 1940 and 1947, there were 10,000 to 13,000 civilians interned in the camps at different times.

Before the war, Britain was home to around 73,000 Germans, who had left Germany due to the rising tensions and the rise of the Nazi regime in the country. Many of these were also young male Germans who had been in schools in Britain before the outbreak of WWII. In June 1940, France fell to Nazi Germany and Allied soldiers were evacuated from Dunkirk. The British government ordered the internment of "enemy aliens" (unnaturalised people born in enemy countries). This included both long-term residents of Britain, as well as recent refugees who were fleeing Nazi oppression, all of whom were regarded as potential spies or Nazi sympathisers.

They were shipped out of the country in the middle of the war, predominantly to Australia (on HMT Dunera from Britain in September 1940) and Canada.

The camps, in rural Australia, were surrounded by two or three parallel rows of perimeter fences of barbed wire up to 10 feet in height, separated by Dannert wire (razor wire that formed in large coils which can be expanded like a concertina), and by 20-foot-high guard towers, guarded by sentries with rifles, Vickers machine guns, or Bren guns, as well as by sentry-defended catwalks, with banks of floodlights 60 to 80 feet high. Soldiers were instructed that familiarity with Internees "should be avoided at all times". Tatura Internment Camps 3 and 4 were opened in 1940.

Tatura Internment Camp 1, part of a Tatura complex of seven internment camps, was built by the Commonwealth on land that it acquired compulsorily from a farmer, with construction completed by February 1940.

Among the more notable internees, interned by Australia for two years as "enemy aliens" in Tatura Internment Camp 3 starting with their arrival in 1940 as they fled Austria, were Jewish refugee from the Nazis (and artist and inventor) (Polish-Jewish) Slawa Horowitz Duldig, who had invented and patented the modern folding umbrella in 1929, along with her Polish-Jewish refugee sculptor husband Karl Duldig, and their daughter Eva Duldig (from the ages of two to four); Eva two decades later represented Australia at the Wimbledon Championships in tennis.

Similarly, artist Ludwig Hirschfeld-Mack had been forced to leave Germany during the rise to power of the Nazis due to his part-Jewish heritage. However, upon arrival in Australia he was deemed an "enemy alien", and interned in internment camps including Tatura, from 1940 to 1942. Another person interned as an "enemy alien" at Tatura was composer Felix Werder, son of a Berlin synagogue cantor.

In 1941, German Templers were shipped from the German Templer Colonies in Palestine and interned for the duration of the war. After arriving in Australia on 25 August 1941, the Templers were housed in Camp 3 in Tatura. Using the experience gained during internment in Egypt in World War I, they quickly established a school and a kindergarten, as well and developed work routines to prevent depression. After the war, the majority of Templer families remained in Australia. The Temple Society Australia was established in 1950.

In 1941, Major Julian Layton arrived from England on a mission. Layton, a Jew like many of the Dunera internees, managed to secure the release of many of them if they enlisted in the British or Australian Army. At the end of the war all of the Dunera internees were released.

Monte Punshon, an Australian teacher who could speak Japanese, was a warden from 1943. Punshon looked after the compound set aside for those who could not speak English and for the school in the camp. Punshon was belatedly decorated for her kindness by the Japanese government when she was over 100 years old.

Also notable were the crew of the German auxiliary cruiser Kormoran, taken prisoner following the battle between HMAS Sydney and the Kormoran. They were housed at Camp 13, Murchison, and Dhurringile mansion. There were also about 500 German civilians detained during the Anglo-Soviet invasion of Iran in August 1941 and housed initially in the Loveday, South Australia, camps, before transfer to the Tatura camps in 1945.

The Tatura German Military Cemetery (36.4304°S 145.2055°E) is the final resting place of 351 German civilians and servicemen who died during internment in World War I and World War II.

== Climate ==
Tatura possesses a humid subtropical climate, but borders an oceanic climate and a temperate semi-arid climate (Köppen: Cfa/Cfb/BSk). The town experiences very warm summers and cool winters. Average maxima vary from 29.8 °C (85.6 °F) in January to 13.0 °C (55.4 °F) in July, while average minima fluctuate between 14.4 °C (57.9 °F) in January and February and 3.1 °C (37.6 °F) in July. Precipitation is low, averaging 482.4 mm (18.99 in) per annum. Rain is spread across 104.6 precipitation days. The town experiences 110.0 clear days and 109.0 cloudy days per annum. Extreme temperatures have ranged from 44.8 °C (112.6 °F) on 25 January 2019 and 7 February 2009 to −6.8 °C (19.8 °F) on 26 June 1965.

Climate data for Tatura (36.44°S 145.27°E, 114 m (374 ft) AMSL) (1964–2024 normals & extremes, rainfall to 1942)
Month	Jan	Feb	Mar	Apr	May	Jun	Jul	Aug	Sep	Oct	Nov	Dec	Year
Record high °C (°F)	44.8 (112.6)	44.8 (112.6)	39.6 (103.3)	35.0 (95.0)	26.3 (79.3)	21.5 (70.7)	22.5 (72.5)	26.0 (78.8)	33.7 (92.7)	35.6 (96.1)	42.1 (107.8)	44.0 (111.2)	44.8 (112.6)
Mean daily maximum °C (°F)	29.8 (85.6)	29.5 (85.1)	26.4 (79.5)	21.6 (70.9)	17.2 (63.0)	13.9 (57.0)	13.0 (55.4)	14.8 (58.6)	17.6 (63.7)	21.2 (70.2)	24.9 (76.8)	27.7 (81.9)	21.5 (70.6)
Mean daily minimum °C (°F)	14.4 (57.9)	14.4 (57.9)	12.0 (53.6)	8.4 (47.1)	5.7 (42.3)	3.7 (38.7)	3.1 (37.6)	3.9 (39.0)	5.4 (41.7)	7.6 (45.7)	10.4 (50.7)	12.5 (54.5)	8.5 (47.2)
Record low °C (°F)	4.7 (40.5)	4.9 (40.8)	3.3 (37.9)	−1.0 (30.2)	−3.2 (26.2)	−6.8 (19.8)	−6.0 (21.2)	−4.1 (24.6)	−3.0 (26.6)	−1.1 (30.0)	0.5 (32.9)	2.0 (35.6)	−6.8 (19.8)
Average precipitation mm (inches)	35.0 (1.38)	31.8 (1.25)	34.3 (1.35)	35.5 (1.40)	44.1 (1.74)	44.8 (1.76)	46.6 (1.83)	46.1 (1.81)	42.3 (1.67)	47.5 (1.87)	39.8 (1.57)	35.1 (1.38)	482.4 (18.99)
Average precipitation days (≥ 0.2 mm)	4.9	4.4	5.4	6.7	10.2	12.1	14.1	12.8	10.6	9.5	7.7	6.2	104.6
Average afternoon relative humidity (%)	36	37	40	49	61	68	68	61	56	48	40	37	50
Average dew point °C (°F)	10.2 (50.4)	11.1 (52.0)	9.9 (49.8)	8.8 (47.8)	8.4 (47.1)	7.1 (44.8)	6.1 (43.0)	6.0 (42.8)	6.8 (44.2)	7.3 (45.1)	7.8 (46.0)	8.8 (47.8)	8.2 (46.7)
Mean monthly sunshine hours	313.1	276.9	269.7	222.0	156.1	126.0	130.2	170.5	198.0	248.0	270.0	297.6	2,678.1
Percentage possible sunshine	70	73	71	66	50	43	42	51	56	61	64	66	59
Source: Bureau of Meteorology (1964–2024 normals & extremes, rainfall to 1942)

== Industry, agriculture, and food ==
Organisations in Tatura include Tatura Milk Industries, Goulburn-Murray Water's corporate headquarters, Jacobs Engineering Group, the Department of Jobs, Precincts and Regions, as well as major regional processing plants for multinational corporations such as Unilever and Snow Brand Milk Products.Trevaskis Engineering is a sheet metal manufacturer, established in 1959 and employing around 50 staff, manufacturing grain handling equipment and other bespoke items for the agriculture sector. The Tatura abattoir processes sheep and goats, mostly for export markets including the USA and South Korea.

The Tatura Show is held yearly in March and International Dairy Week (which is the second-largest dairy show in the Southern Hemisphere) in January each year attracting over 6,000 exhibitors, vendors and onlookers from Australia as well as overseas. The Taste of Tatura Food and Wine Festival is held on the first Sunday in March.

Tatura Hot Bread won prizes in the Professional Section of The Great Australian Vanilla Slice Triumph in 2006, and again in 2007.

== Sport ==
Tatura has many sporting facilities located within the town, including Australian Rules football ovals, soccer fields, cricket pitches, tennis courts, Lawn Bowls greens, a Basketball stadium and the 18-hole golf course of the Hilltop Golf Club. The town has an Australian Rules football team competing in the Goulburn Valley Football League, the Tatura Bulldogs.

Tatura Lawn Tennis Club, has 12 grass courts and 4 synthetic hard courts, and hosts an annual round-robin tennis tournament on the grass courts each March, with entrants coming from across Australia.

Tatura soccer club participates in the Bendigo amateur soccer league.The club was founded in 1961 by Italian immigrants.

Tatura is home to the Tatura Racecourse Reserve, where the Tatura & Shepparton Racing Club Inc hosts a minimum of three full TAB race meetings each season, including the Italian Plate Festival in December – a celebration of the local Italian community and culture – and the Tatura Easter Cup. The Cup day also features the Mark Goring Memorial race, honouring jockey Mark Goring who died of injuries sustained in a fall at the Tatura track in 2003. As well as a Western & Quarter Horse arena and Club rooms, the Reserve is a thoroughbred training facility, with grass and sand track, and swimming facilities as well as practice barriers and jumps schooling course. 20 Racing Victoria-licensed trainers are registered to the Racecourse. In addition to race meetings, the club also runs regular official trials and jumpouts (unbroadcast trials).

== Education ==
Tatura has two primary schools serving both the town and surrounding areas: Tatura Primary School is a public school located south of the town centre, whilst Sacred Heart School is a private Catholic school located on the town's main street. Due to Tatura's proximity to Shepparton, secondary education options include Notre Dame College, Shepparton, Goulburn Valley Grammar School, and Greater Shepparton Secondary College.

Tatura is located 20 minutes from La Trobe University Shepparton Campus as well as the Goulburn Ovens Institute of TAFE, which both offer a range of tertiary and TAFE courses for the Goulburn Valley.

== Media ==
The main print publications distributed within Tatura include the daily Shepparton News, the weekly The Adviser Shepparton, the weekly Tatura Guardian, and the monthly Tatura Bulletin.
