= 1957 Maccabiah Games =

International Jewish multi-sport event

5th Maccabiah
- Host city: Tel Aviv, Israel
- Nations: 21
- Debuting countries: Mexico
- Athletes: 980
- Opening: September 15, 1957
- Closing: September 24, 1957
- Opened by: Israeli President Yitzhak Ben Zvi
- Main venue: Ramat Gan Stadium

Twenty-one countries sent 980 athletes to compete in the 1957 5th Maccabiah Games, an international Jewish athletics competition similar to the Olympics. The opening ceremony on September 15, 1957, was held in Ramat Gan Stadium, with athletes parading before Israeli President Yitzhak Ben Zvi.

The presence of many world-class Jewish athletes elevated the quality of competition. The athletes were housed in the newly built Maccabiah Village. The closing ceremony on September 24, 1957, was attended by 50,000 people, and Prime Minister David Ben Gurion addressed the crowd, saying: "Be strong. Be unified. Be proud and conscious of your Jewishness and send your youth to Israel to restore the glory and greatness of our people."

== History ==
The Maccabiah Games were first held in 1932.

== Notable competitors ==
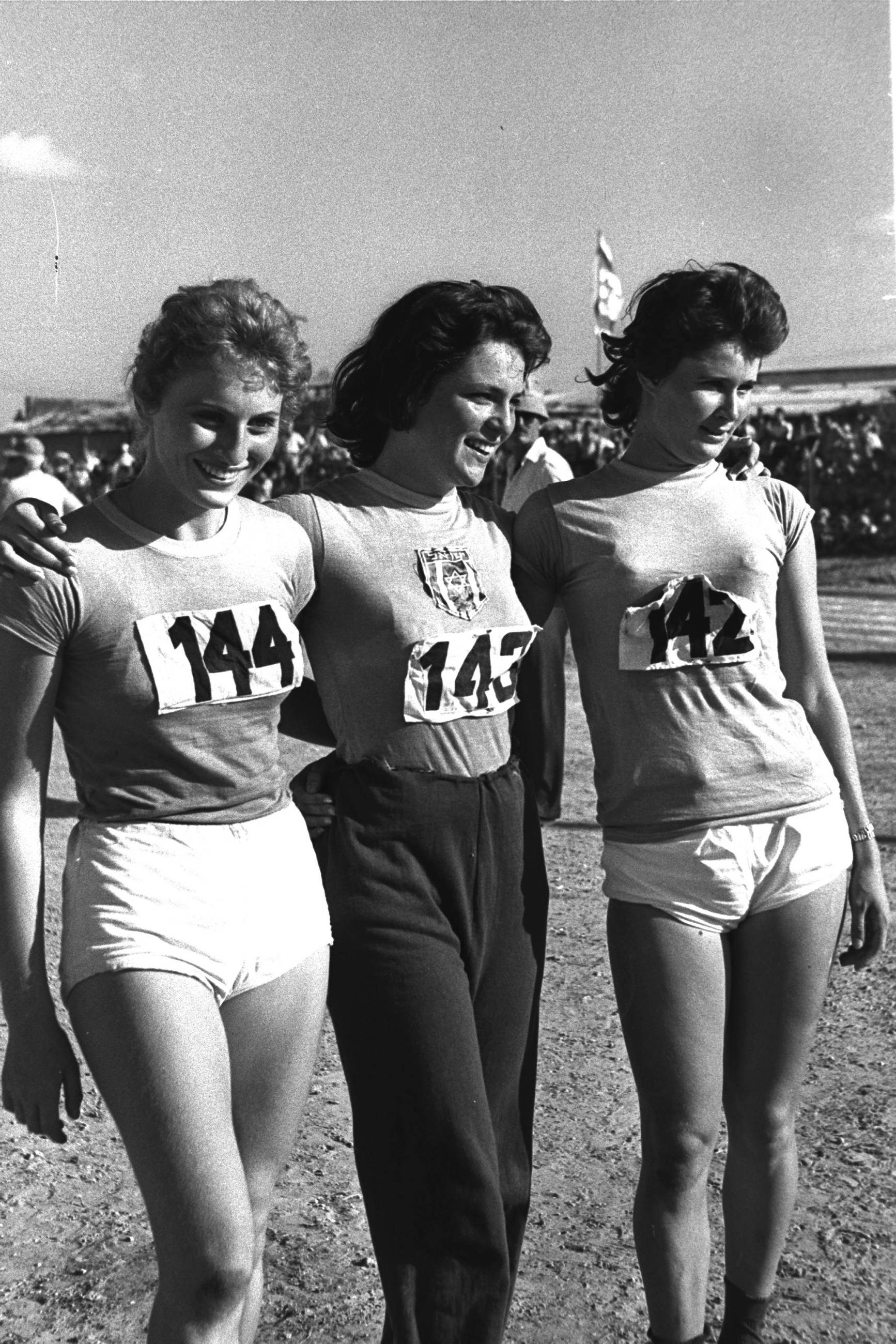
Female runners at the Games.

Olympian Abie Grossfeld of the United States dominated the Games, winning seven golds in seven gymnastics events: AA, R, PH, FX, HB, PB, & V. Ágnes Keleti (born Ágnes Klein), Olympic and world champion artistic gymnast, competed for Israel in the Games.

In fencing, British Olympian and world champion Allan Jay won three gold medals, fencing foil and epee. American Olympian Byron Krieger, two-time Pan American Games gold-medal winner, won individual gold in sabre and individual bronze in foil. American Olympian Albert Axelrod, who won a bronze medal at the Olympics in foil three years later, won the gold medal in individual foil. Krieger and Axelord won gold medals in the foil team championship for the United States.

In track, British Olympian Harry Kane won the 400 meter hurdles, won a gold medal in the quarter mile run, and took a silver medal in the 200 meter hurdles, with a time of 25.3 seconds. World record holder Henry Laskau of the United States won a gold medal in 3,000 m race walking. American Olympian Marty Engel won a gold medal in the hammer throw, and a bronze medal in discus. Israeli Olympian David Kushnir won a gold medal in the broad jump. British Olympian Harry Kane won a gold medal in the 400 m hurdles, and a silver medal in the 200 m hurdles. Israeli Olympian Arieh Batun-Kleinstub (Naveh) won the gold medal in the high jump. Reuven Helman competed in shot-put, javelin, the decathlon and weightlifting. Helman came in second in the Games.

In weightlifting, Israeli-born American Olympic champion Isaac Berger, a future world champion, became the first athlete to establish a world record in the State of Israel, pressing 258 pounds (117 kg) in featherweight competition for the US, and won a gold medal, a year after winning an Olympic gold medal. Ben Helfgott, a concentration camp survivor and later an Olympian, won the weightlifting gold medal in the lightweight class for Great Britain for the third Games in a row.

In swimming, Jane Katz, a 14-year-old future Olympian, competed for the United States, winning the 100m butterfly, winning a bronze medal in the 400 m, and winning a silver medal in the medley relay. Israel's Olympian Shoshana Ribner won a silver medal in the 400 m.

In tennis, Australian Eva Duldig won a gold medal.

Al Seiden won a gold medal with Team USA in basketball, and was the top scorer in the tournament. The team was coached by Harry Litwack, a future member of the Naismith Memorial Basketball Hall of Fame.

== Participating communities ==
Mexico sent its first contingent of athletes. The number in parentheses indicates the number of participants that community contributed.

- Argentina
- Australia (13)
- Austria (14)
- Belgium
- Brazil
- Canada (32)
- Chile
- Denmark (3)
- Finland
- France (60)
- India (7)
- Ireland
- Israel (600)
- Mexico
- Netherlands
- Rhodesia
- South Africa (77)
- Sweden
- Switzerland
- United Kingdom (97)
- United States (40)

== Link ==
- Summaries of each of the Games
