= Eva Duldig =

Austrian-born Australian-Dutch tennis player (born 1938)

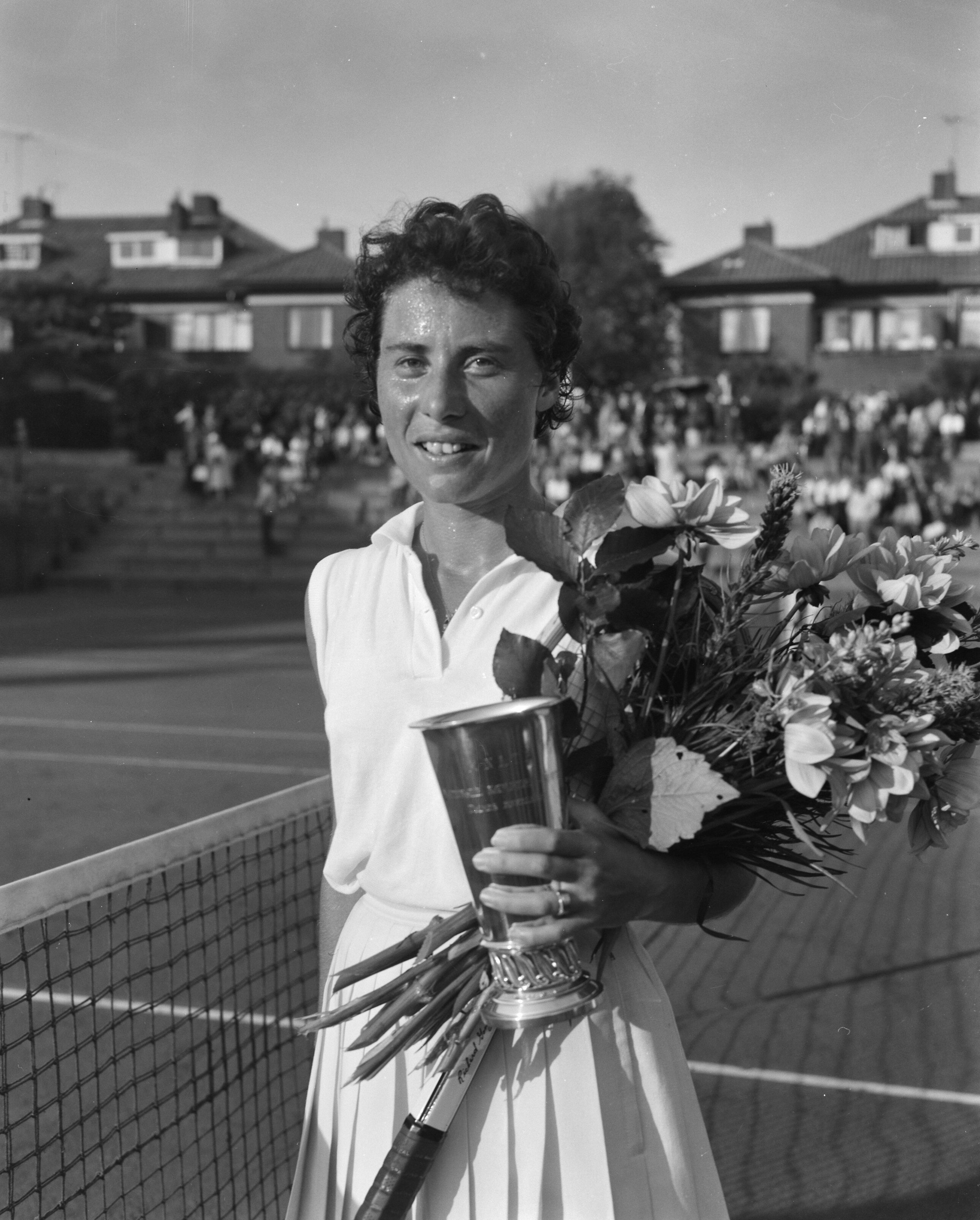
- Eva de Jong-Duldig in August 1962
- Full name: Eva Ruth Duldig
- ITF name: Eva de Jong
- Country (sports): Australia, Netherlands
- Residence: Australia
- Born: 11 February 1938 (age 88) Vienna, Austria
- Plays: Right-handed
- College: University of Melbourne

Grand Slam singles results
- Australian Open: R4 (1957, 1959, 1968)
- French Open: R1 (1961, 1963)
- Wimbledon: R3 (1961, 1962, 1963)

Grand Slam doubles results
- Australian Open: QF (1958, 1959)
- Wimbledon: QF (1961)

Grand Slam mixed doubles results
- Wimbledon: R3 (1963)

Team competitions
- Fed Cup: QF (1963)
- Children: 3, incl. Tania de Jong
- Parents: Karl Duldig (father); Slawa Horowitz Duldig (mother)
Medal record
Maccabiah Games
Gold medal – first place	1957 Israel	Women's singles
Gold medal – first place	1961 Israel	Women's singles
Silver medal – second place	1961 Israel	Women's doubles

Eva Ruth de Jong-Duldig (née Duldig; born 11 February 1938) is an Austrian-born Australian and Dutch former tennis player, and current author. From the ages of two to four, she was detained by Australia in an isolated internment camp, as an enemy alien. She later competed in tennis, representing Australia at the Wimbledon Championships in 1961. She also played at Wimbledon in 1962 and 1963 for the Netherlands, and competed in the Australian Open, French Championships, Fed Cup, and in the Israel-based Maccabiah Games, sometimes called the Jewish Olympics, where she won two gold medals.

== Early life ==
=== Austria ===
Duldig was born in Vienna, Austria, and is Jewish. Her father was modernist sculptor Karl Duldig (1902–1986). He played international soccer as a goalkeeper for Hakoah Wien, was the Austrian table tennis champion in 1923, and was one of the country's top tennis players. Her mother was artist and inventor Slawa Horowitz Duldig (c. 1902–1975), who invented and patented an improved folding umbrella in 1929.

=== Switzerland ===
In 1938 when she was eight months old, in the wake of deportations of Jews from Vienna to Dachau concentration camp, fleeing the Nazis the family left Austria for Switzerland. The family managed to escape after Nazi Germany's Anschluss of Austria in March 1938, as her father traveled to Switzerland on a temporary visa to play in a tennis tournament. Later that year he convinced an official to allow his family to come and "visit" him in Zurich, thereby staying a step ahead of the Holocaust.

Duldig later said: "We were lucky to get out with our lives. Most of our family was obliterated."

=== Singapore; deported ===
The family was only allowed to stay in Switzerland for a short time. They therefore then moved to Singapore by boat in April 1939. There, initially her parents ran an art school and her mother restored paintings.

In Singapore, six months after their arrival the British arrested them, because they had German identity documents. Austria had been annexed by Germany in March 1938 in the Anschluss, and therefore the family and all other Austrians by law had become citizens of the German Reich. Across the British Empire the same laws were applied to what were deemed "aliens," and the British colonial government classified the family as "citizens of an enemy country" – "enemy aliens". They were deported by boat from Singapore to Australia in September 1940.

=== Australia; enemy alien ===
In Australia, in the wake of the outbreak of World War II, two-year-old Eva and her parents were classified as enemy aliens upon their arrival due to their having arrived with German identity papers. Beginning the year prior to their arrival in Australia, a new Australian law had designated people "enemy aliens" if they were Germans, or were Australians who had been born in Germany. The Australian government therefore interned the three of them for two years in isolated Tatura Internment Camp 3 D, 180 kilometres north of Melbourne. They were held with nearly 300 other internees.

The internment camp was located near Shepparton, in the northern part of the state of Victoria. There, armed soldiers manned watchtowers and scanned the camp that was bordered by a barbed wire fence with searchlights, and other armed soldiers patrolled the camp. Petitions to Australian politicians, stressing that they were Jewish refugees and therefore being unjustly imprisoned, had no effect.

They remained in the internment camp until 1942, when her father enlisted in the Australian Army. The family later lived in St Kilda, in Glen Iris, and then in Malvern East, in Melbourne, Australia, and became Australian citizens.

Duldig graduated from Melbourne University in Australia (GDip Physical Education 1957, BA 1971). She took a role as physical education teacher in 1957 at Mount Scopus College, a Jewish day school in Melbourne.

== Tennis career ==
=== Early years, Maccabiah champion ===
Duldig became a tennis player in Australia. In 1956 she won the Victorian Schoolgirls Championship.

In the 1957 Maccabiah Games, Duldig won gold medals in singles and doubles. In the 1961 Maccabiah Games, she again won a gold medal in singles, this time defeating South African Marlene Gerson in the final, and won a silver medal in women's doubles.

=== Australian Open ===
Playing in the Australian Open, Duldig made it to the Round of 16 in singles in 1957, 1959, and 1968, and to the Round of 32 in 1958 and the Round of 64 in 1961. In doubles at the Australian Open, she made it to the quarterfinals in 1958 and 1959, to the Round of 16 in 1961, and to the Round of 32 in 1968.

=== Wimbledon ===
She played tennis at the Wimbledon Championships in 1961, 1962, and 1963. She took unpaid leave from her job as a teacher to compete at Wimbledon.

In 1961 Duldig played women' singles at Wimbledon, representing Australia, and defeated West German Renate Ostermann in Round 1, and Robin Blakelock of Great Britain in Round 2, while losing to #8 seed American Karen Hantze in Round 3. In addition, she played mixed doubles with partner Roger Dowdeswell from Zimbabwe, and they lost in Round 2 to Geoffrey Paish of Great Britain and Susan Chatrier of France.

Duldig also represented Australia at the 1961 Wimbledon Championships in ladies' doubles, reaching the quarterfinals with partner Marlene Gerson, where they were defeated by American Sally Moore and Australian Lesley Turner.

In 1962 at Wimbledon, representing the Netherlands, in women's singles she beat Lea Pericoli of Italy in Round 2, but was defeated by #2 seeded American Darlene Hard in Round 3. Playing in women's doubles with partner Jenny Ridderhof-Seven of the Netherlands, in Round 2 they defeated West Germans Renate Ostermann and Helga Schultze, while in Round 3 they were defeated by South Africans Valerie Forbes and Heather Segal. Playing in mixed doubles with partner Willem Maris of the Netherlands, in Round 1 they defeated Australian Jim Shepherd and South African Heather Segal, and in Round 2 they were beaten by Billy Knight and Jean Knight of the United Kingdom.

In 1963 at Wimbledon, again representing the Netherlands, in women's singles she beat Hungary Zsófia Broszmann of Hungary in the round of 64, but was defeated by Elizabeth Starkie of Great Britain in the round of 32. Playing in women's doubles with partner Jenny Ridderhof-Seven, in Round 1 they beat Canadian Hanna Sladek and Jenny Wagstaff of the United Kingdom, in round 2 they defeated American Judy Alvarez and Australian Carole Newman, and in Round 3 they were defeated by South Africans Margaret Hunt and Annette Van Zyl. Playing in mixed doubles with partner Willem Maris of the Netherlands, in Round 2 they defeated South Africans Tony Hagan and CM Callanan, and in Round 3 they were beaten by West Germany Wilhelm Bungert and South African Renée Schuurman.

=== French Championships ===
Duldig played singles in the 1961 French Championships, losing to 14th seed Deidre Keller of Great Britain in the Round of 128. She then played women's singles in the 1963 French Championships, losing to Helga Hosl of Germany in Round 1.

=== Dutch champion ===
In 1962 she won the National Championships of the Netherlands in both women's singles and doubles.

=== Fed Cup ===
After she married her Dutch husband Henri in 1962, she moved to the Netherlands and represented the country in tennis.

She was the highest-ranked female player for the Netherlands in the first Federation Cup, held in 1957 at Queens Club. In June 1963 she played in the 1963 Federation Cup against Switzerland, defeating Alice Wavre in singles, and winning in doubles against Janine Bourgnon and Anne-Marie Studer with her partner Jenny Ridderhof. That same month she played in the Fed Cup against the United States, and was defeated by Darlene Hard in singles, and by Billie Jean Moffitt (King) and Carole Caldwell, while partnering Jenny Ridderhof, in the quarter-final.

=== Australian Championships ===
In January 1968 she played in the 1968 Australian Championships in women's singles, and defeated Kay Williams in Round 1, and Kerry Ballard in Round 2, before losing to Lesley Bowrey in Round 3. In women's doubles, she partnered Robin Lesh, and they lost in the first round to American Mary-Ann Beattie and Australian Lynne Nette.

=== Honors ===
In 2000, she was inducted into the Maccabi Victoria Hall of Fame.

== Family and later life ==
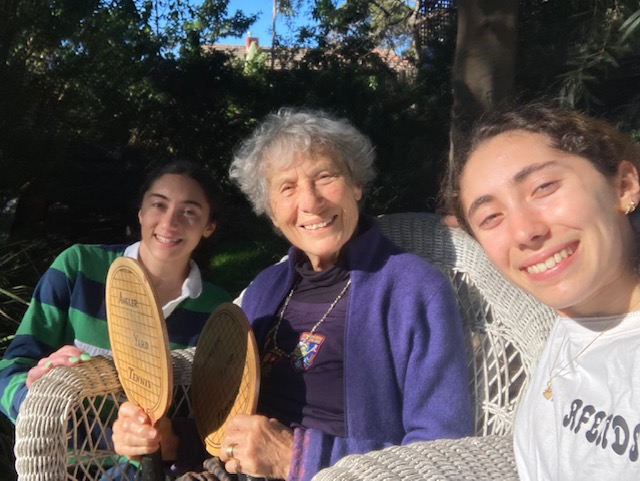
Eva Duldig and her granddaughters, 2022

Duldig met Dutch Maccabiah tennis player Henri de Jong on a Tel Aviv tennis court at the 1961 Maccabiah Games in Israel. They became engaged five days after they met, and married in February 1962 in Australia at the St Kilda Hebrew Congregation synagogue. They initially lived for three years in Arnhem in Holland before settling in Melbourne. They were married for 57 years until his death in 2019.

Her daughter, Tania de Jong, is an Australian soprano, social entrepreneur, and businesswoman. In 1965, the family returned to Melbourne, and after she gave birth to two more children, Antony and Pieter, Duldig found it challenging to maintain her tennis. After her tennis career, she worked as a recreation consultant, an author, and a designer of playgrounds.

She founded the Duldig Studio in 2002 in East Malvern. It is run as a non-profit public museum and art gallery from their former house. It displays the works of her parents.

In 2009 she received the City of Stonnington Citizen of the Year Award for "outstanding service to the community" in the area of arts and culture. In 2016 she received a Victorian Community History Historical Interpretation Award with filmmaker David Smith for "Duldig Studio Documentaries. Volume 1".

In 2022, her granddaughters Andrea and Emma de Jong ran in the 2022 Maccabiah Games, and Emma won the 800 metres and 1,500-metre run as a junior.

=== Memoir and musical ===
Duldig wrote the memoir Driftwood: Escape and Survival through Art about her family's experiences. In 2017, it won a Victorian Community History Award and in 2018, it was longlisted for the Dobbie Award.

Her memoir was made into a musical in 2022, entitled Driftwood – The Musical, directed by Wesley Enoch. Her daughter Tania wrote some of the lyrics. Australian Broadcasting Corporation wrote that the musical "is a remarkable story". The Australian Jewish News wrote: "there's no shortage of drama, heartache and lucky escape." Limelight wrote that the musical was "sincere to a fault." The Age wrote: "Director Gary Abrahams keeps the story's emotional core vivid and convincing and Anthony Barnhill's score suits the material well. The singing is excellent.... this show has heart."

== See also ==
- List of Netherlands Fed Cup team representatives
- List of select Jewish tennis players
