= Slawa Duldig =

Inventor, artist, interior designer, teacher (1901–1975)

- Born: Slawa Horowitz; 28 November 1901; Horocko, Poland
- Died: 16 August 1975 (aged 73)
- Education: Akademie der Bildenen Künste Wien
- Occupations: Inventor; artist; interior designer; teacher
- Spouse: Karl Duldig (m. 1931)
- Children: Eva Duldig
- Relatives: Tania de Jong (granddaughter)

Slawa Duldig née Horowitz (28 November 1901– 16 August 1975) was an inventor, artist, interior designer, and teacher. In 1929, as Slawa Horowitz, she patented a design for an improved compact folding umbrella.

Duldig was the wife of the modernist sculptor Karl (Karol) Duldig and the mother of Eva de Jong-Duldig, a champion Australian tennis player. Her art works and those of her husband are displayed at the Duldig Studio, an artists' house museum in Melbourne, Australia founded by their daughter.

== Early years ==
Slawa Horowitz was born in Horocko, Poland, the daughter of Nathan and Antonia ('Toni') Horowitz. At the time, her father was the director of a flour mill in the nearby city of Lwow. Her maternal grandparents, the Meisels, were local landowners and operated a mixed farm.

In 1911, concerned by increasing political unrest, the Horowitz family relocated from Poland to Vienna, Austria. Slawa attended a convent school and showed early promise as a pianist. The three Horowitz children were to follow creative pursuits, with Slawa becoming an artist and designer, her sister Aurelie ('Rella') an actress, and brother Marek, a lawyer who also wrote poetry and composed music.

== Education ==
On leaving school, Slawa received training in the fine arts at the Viennese School for Women and Girls.

From 1922 to 1925, Slawa studied with the Viennese sculptor, Anton Hanak, an affiliate of the late nineteenth-century Vienna Secession artistic movement and friend of the founder, Gustav Klimt. In 1929, she graduated from the Akademie der Bildenen Künste Wien (Academy of Fine Arts, Vienna), as the student of Professor Hans Bitterlich, a sculptor. In 1926, her clay sculpture 'Mother and Child' was commended by the Kurjer Lwow (Lwow Courier newspaper) in an exhibition of the work of Professor Bitterlich's students at the Vienna Künstlerhaus.

== Invention of the folding umbrella ==
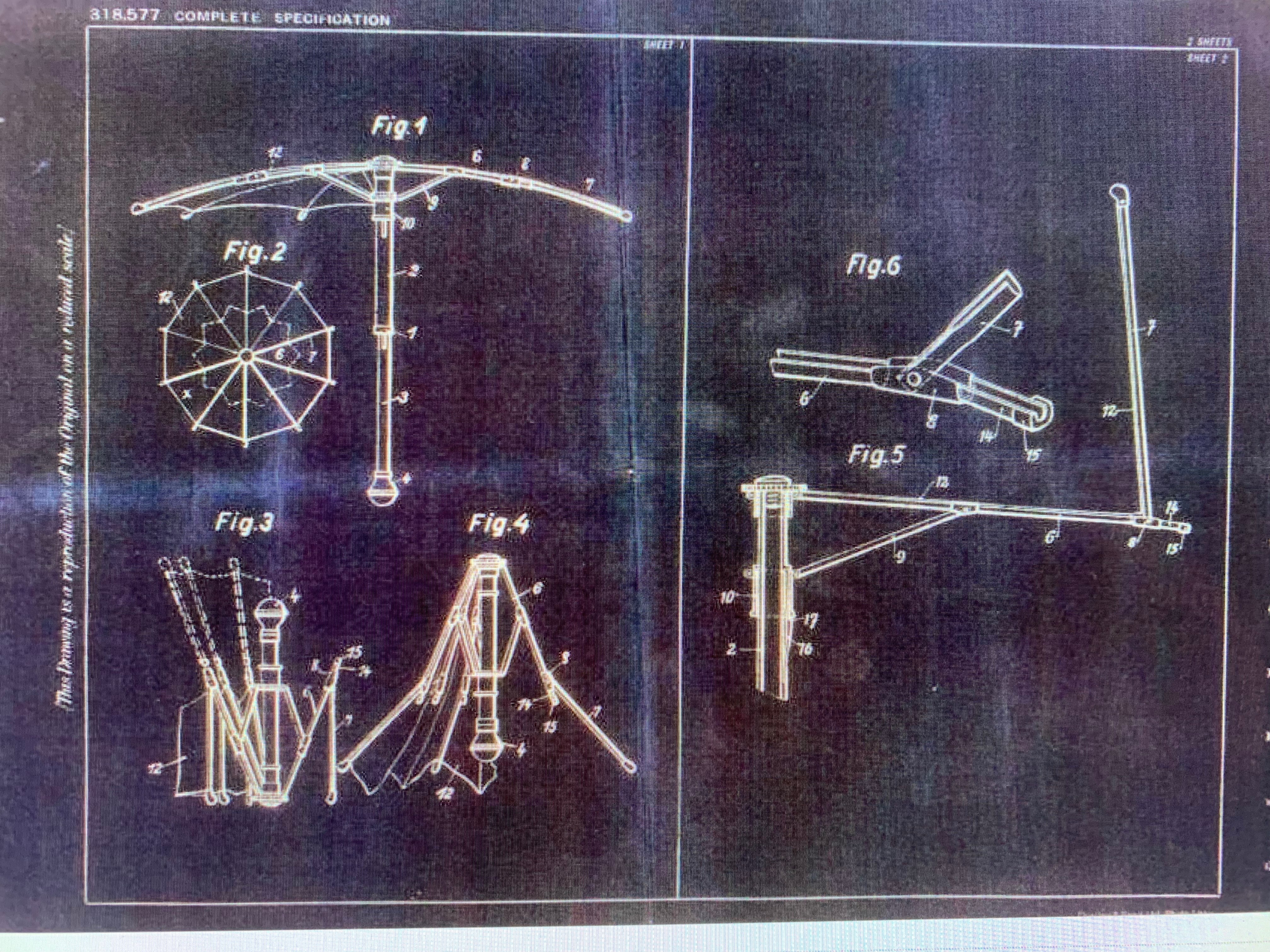
Slawa kept her folding umbrella secret until she had secured a patent.

In 1928, following a wet-weather visit to the Kunsthistorisches Museum, Vienna, Slawa conceived the idea for a manageable, handbag-sized folding umbrella. She reflected on the event in later life, "'It happened [that] one May morning, a cold and rainy day, I armed myself with a big umbrella and muttered to myself, 'Why on earth must I carry this utterly clumsy thing? Can't they invent a small folding umbrella which could be easily carried in a bag?'"

Slawa sought to remedy the problem of cumbersome umbrellas with much ingenuity and the support of her parents, sister Rella and close friend Karl Duldig. She drafted designs and obtained umbrella spokes from an industrial source on the pretext that she was designing a lampshade. She engaged a watchmaker to assist with the manufacturing process, bought some black silk fabric, made a pattern, and attached the silk to a shaft and spokes. Karl Duldig suggested that the handle be widened to enable the spokes to fit inside. From this, the prototype of a modern folding umbrella emerged.

With money loaned by her father to engage Viennese patent attorney Ing. Josef Hess, Slawa filed a patent application for the umbrella design. Patent applications were sent to the United Kingdom, Austria, Germany, Italy, France, Poland, and the United States. A patent, Specification 318,577, was issued on 19 September 1929.

In the words of Helen Kiddell, 'The umbrella that Slawa patented had a telescopic handle, allowing it to be made more compact. The metal ribs which formed the skeleton under the black silk covering, were innovatively designed to fold up.'

The umbrella was commercially branded 'Flirt.' It was manufactured by the firm of Brüder Wüster in Austria, and Kortenbrach und Rauh in Germany. Ten-thousand 'Flirt' umbrellas sold in the first year of production, with Slawa receiving annual royalties until 1938. 'Flirt' featured at the 1931 Vienna Spring Fair; '"…the sculptress Slawa Horowitz has invented a magic umbrella that can be folded so small it can fit in a handbag…"' enthused a reporter of the Neuigkeits Welt Blatt (New World Paper).

== Family ==
Slawa married Karl Duldig in 1931. Theirs was an artistic union, forged in Anton Hanak's sculpture class. Their daughter Eva Duldig was born on 11 February 1938.

Slawa and Karl Duldig resided in an apartment at 2 Enzingergasse, Door 14, Vienna, which they decorated in the style of the Wiener Werkstätte (Viennese Workshops). They commissioned furniture from the firm of Sigmund Jaray, where Slawa collaborated with the head designer, an architect, to create several significant and unique furniture pieces. Slawa's design innovations included 'red leather strapping in a lattice design for the living room chairs' and a double bed with head and foot featuring, 'small rectangular blocks of mahogany and rosewood ... intended by her to replicate lace.'

== War years ==
In 1938, following the annexation of Austria to Nazi Germany (the Anschluss), a series of significant human rights violations occurred in Vienna. These included attacks on Jewish homes and businesses, deportations of Jews to Dachau concentration camp, the burning of all Viennese synagogues and prayer houses, and the arrests of 6,547 people. As Jewish people concerned by the potential increasing risk of harm, Slawa and Karl Duldig, with their infant child Eva, departed Vienna for Switzerland.

Karl was the first of the family to arrive in Switzerland. Initially, Slawa and Eva remained in Vienna, where Slawa packed the contents of their apartment, which were entrusted to the care of her sister Rella. Slawa had received notification from "the Nazi Gaulieter (District Superintendent)" that she must evacuate their apartment. The Nazi official offered to purchase the contents of the apartment, and was outwitted by Slawa who advised that the contents had already been sold. Slawa and her friend Melitta Despitz then conspired for Melitta to become the purchaser of the apartment's contents, in the presence of the official. Their ruse was successful, whereby Slawa managed to retain her family's belongings and entrust their care to Rella in Paris.

Slawa and Eva travelled to Switzerland on temporary visas instigated by Karl and organised by Swiss immigration official Ernest Speck. In Switzerland, Slawa sold the rights of the 'Flirt' umbrella to Brüder Wüster for 1,000 Reichsmarks.

In May 1939, the Duldig family arrived in Singapore as refugees. Karl and Slawa set up an art school and Slawa also found employment in art restoration. With Britain declaring war on Germany, their status as foreign nationals became increasingly problematic. In July 1940 they and their baby, Eva, were expelled from Singapore as enemy aliens.

Transported with German and Italian internees on the HMT Queen Mary, they arrived in Sydney, Australia, on 25 September 1940. They were detained as enemy aliens in Tatura Internment Camp 3 D, northern Victoria.

Karl was released from the Camp on 7 April 1942 to join the 8th Employment Company (8th. A.E.C.). Slawa and Eva remained at the Camp until 14 May 1942. With their reclassification from enemy aliens to refugee aliens on 7 December 1943, Slawa and Karl Duldig settled in Melbourne for the remainder of their lives.

Many members of Slawa's family had remained in wartime Europe. On 11 October 1944, Slawa sought news of her sister Rella through the Red Cross. On 28 November 1944, she received notification that Rella and Rella's husband Marcel Laisné were residing safely in Paris. There, Rella and Marcel had ensured the safe-keeping of the contents of Slawa and Karl's Viennese apartment during the War. A selection of the Duldig's belongings, including the Sigmund Jaray signature pieces, was shipped to Australia in 1946. They constitute part of the collection at the Duldig Studio.

Slawa and Rella were re-united in Paris on 20 June 1968. Their brother Marek, father Nathan, and extended family including the Herzogs, Sobels, Wasners, and Spiegels, had "disappeared without any trace" in wartime Europe.

== Teaching career ==
In 1945, Slawa attained registration as a teacher of Art and German and was employed by Korowa Church of England Girls Grammar School. In 1947, she was appointed Senior Art and Craft teacher at St Catherine's Girls School, where she remained for 16 years. At St Catherine's School, Slawa was acknowledged for the depth and breadth of her teaching approach, which featured first-hand knowledge of European Old Master art, craft and furniture design, and innovative approaches enabling students 'free expression' and experimental approaches. Slawa was one of the first teachers in Victoria to offer Art as a Matriculation subject.

In June 1954, Slawa was one of 13 women to attend the UNESCO seminar, 'The Role of the Visual Arts in Education' at Melbourne University Women's College. Slawa participated in an associated working group on 'Art in Secondary Schools,' which forwarded the recommendation that Art should be accorded equal status in the schools with all other subjects.

In Melbourne, in approximately 1945, Karl and Slawa Duldig started a hand-made pottery business. Karl produced the ceramics and he and Slawa were involved in their decoration. Their metropolitan Melbourne retail outlets included The Primrose Pottery Shop (which stocked works by prominent Australian artists such as Arthur Boyd), Light and Shade (in the Royal Arcade), and Chez Nous (in Howey Place).

== Duldig Studio ==
Slawa died on 16 August 1975. In accordance with her wishes, the family home and studio at 92 Burke Road, East Malvern, was preserved as the Duldig Studio museum and sculpture garden by Eva de-Jong Duldig. Within the house a number of rooms are maintained as they were during the family's residence. Karl's original studio, with kiln, tools, and work across all periods has been kept as it was left by the artist, and in the adjoining garden the bronze and terracotta sculptures also remain in situ. Prototypes of the 'Flirt' are also on display.

== Family ==
Karl and Slawa's daughter Eva became a tennis player, and competed at the Wimbledon Championships in 1961 for Australia. She also played at Wimbledon in 1962 and 1963 for the Netherlands, and competed in the Australian Open, French Championships, Fed Cup, and in the Maccabiah Games in Israel where she won two gold medals.

Eva later wrote a memoir, Driftwood: Escape and Survival through Art (Melbourne: Australian Scholarly Publishing and Arcadia, 2017) about her family's experiences. In 2017, it won a Victorian Community History Award and in 2018, it was longlisted for the Dobbie Award. Her memoir was made into a musical in 2022, entitled Driftwood – The Musical, directed by Wesley Enoch. Her daughter Tania wrote some of the lyrics. Australian Broadcasting Corporation wrote that the musical "is a remarkable story". The Australian Jewish News wrote: "there's no shortage of drama, heartache and lucky escape." Limelight wrote that the musical was "sincere to a fault." The Age wrote: "Director Gary Abrahams keeps the story's emotional core vivid and convincing and Anthony Barnhill's score suits the material well. The singing is excellent.... this show has heart."

Slawa's granddaughter, Tania de Jong, born in 1964, is an Australian soprano, social entrepreneur, and businesswoman. In 1965, after Tania's birth, the family returned to Melbourne, and after she gave birth to two more children Duldig found it challenging to maintain her tennis. After her tennis career, she worked as a recreation consultant, a writer, and a designer of children's play spaces.

In 2022, Slawa's great-granddaughters Andrea and Emma de Jong ran in the 2022 Maccabiah Games, and Emma won the 800 metres and 1,500-metre run as a junior.

== Recognition ==
In 1977, the McClelland Gallery (now the McClelland Gallery and Sculpture Park) in Langwarrin, Australia, featured the exhibition Slawa Duldig – Artist Teacher Inventor. The exhibition included examples of Slawa's drawings for the patent of the 'Flirt' umbrella, and her drawings, paintings and sculptures spanning a period from c.1915–1974.

In 1978, St Catherine's School inaugurated the senior student Slawa Duldig Art Prize.

Umbrellas of the 'Flirt' design continued in production during the twentieth century. Prototypes of the 'Flirt' umbrella, as created by Slawa, are held in the collections of the Museum of Applied Arts and Sciences in Sydney and the Duldig Studio.

== See also ==
- List of Australian artists
- List of women innovators and inventors by country
