= Malvern East =

- Suburb
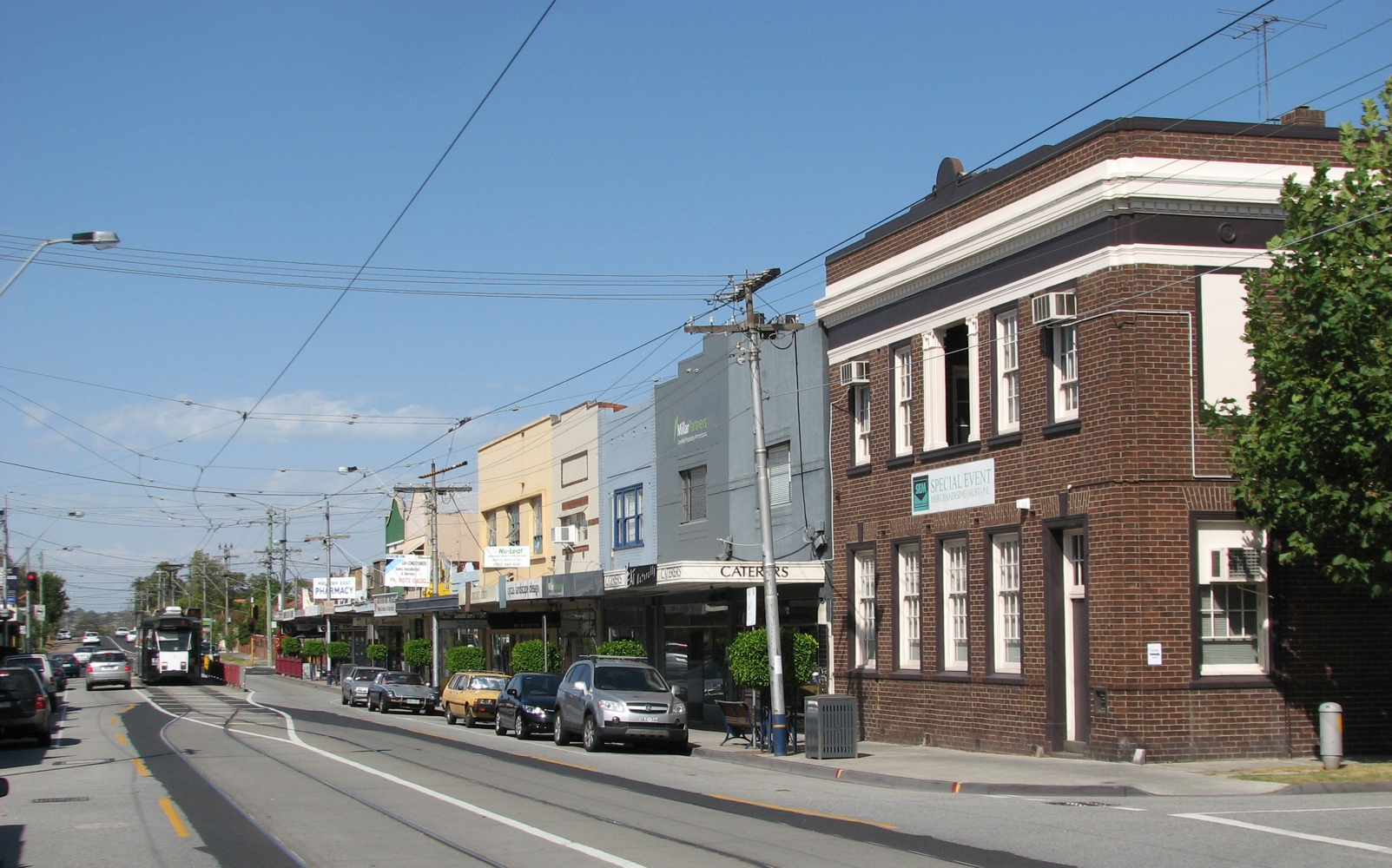
- Waverley Road

- Interactive map of Malvern East
- Coordinates: 37.878°S 145.060°E
- Country: Australia
- State: Victoria
- City: Melbourne
- LGA: City of Stonnington
- Location: 12 km (7.5 mi) from Melbourne

Government
  - State electorate: Malvern
  - Federal divisions: Chisholm; Kooyong

Area
  - Total: 7.6 km^{2} (2.9 sq mi)
- Elevation: 38 m (125 ft)

Population
  - Total: 22,296 (SAL 2021)
- Postcode: 3145
Suburbs around Malvern East
Malvern	Glen Iris	Ashburton
Caulfield East	Malvern East	Ashwood
Carnegie	Murrumbeena	Chadstone

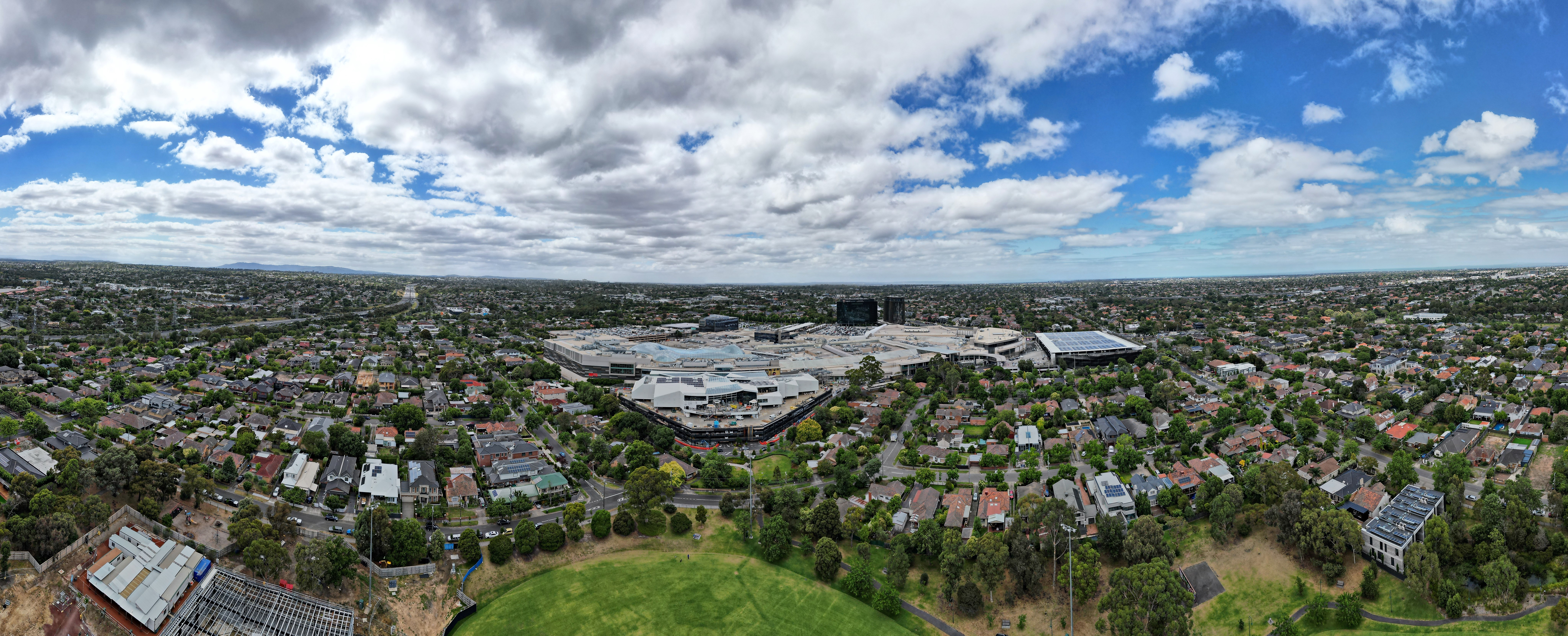
Aerial panorama of Chadstone Shopping Centre with the Dandenong Ranges on the horizon

Malvern East is a suburb in Melbourne, Victoria, Australia, 12 km south-east of the Melbourne central business district, located within the City of Stonnington local government area. Malvern East recorded a population of 22,296 at the 2021 census.

Malvern East is bounded to the north by Wattletree Road and Gardiners Creek, to the east by Warrigal Road, to the south by the Princes Highway (Dandenong Road) and to the west by Tooronga Road.

It is most famous for the Chadstone Shopping Centre, the largest shopping centre in the southern hemisphere, and the largest by total lettable space under one roof.

In recent times, what was once a relatively small suburb was extended to incorporate parts of neighbouring Chadstone. Based on its easterly proximity to Malvern, the expansion and redefinition of Malvern East was driven in the 1990s by resident groups eager to 'reclaim' their address from being identified with the Chadstone Shopping Centre, which had been massively expanded since its original construction. However, the Chadstone Shopping Centre shares the 'Malvern East' address and postcode.

== History ==
The first Malvern East Post Office opened on 4 August 1914 by (Source needed), who was raised in East Malvern and was renamed Wattletree Road 20 days later. The second Malvern East Post Office opened in 1924 and was renamed Central Park in 1928. The third Malvern East Post Office was renamed from Caulfield East in 1928, but reverted to that name in 1929. The fourth Malvern East Post Office opened around 1935 and closed in 1993.

Three post offices remain marking the major commercial areas of the suburb; Wattletree Road office on the corner of Tooronga Road, Central Park office on Burke Road near Wattletree Road and Darling South office on Waverley Road.

The suburb is also home to the Buddhist Society of Victoria, founded in 1953, making it the oldest Buddhist Institution in Victoria.

== Parks and gardens ==
Malvern East has a number of popular public open spaces, the most notable of which are Hedgeley Dene Gardens, Central Park and the Urban Forest Reserve. While Central Park and its surrounding residential neighbourhood are subject to heritage protection, Hedgeley Dene Gardens is the first public open space to be designated worthy of protection on neighbourhood character grounds.

== Transport ==
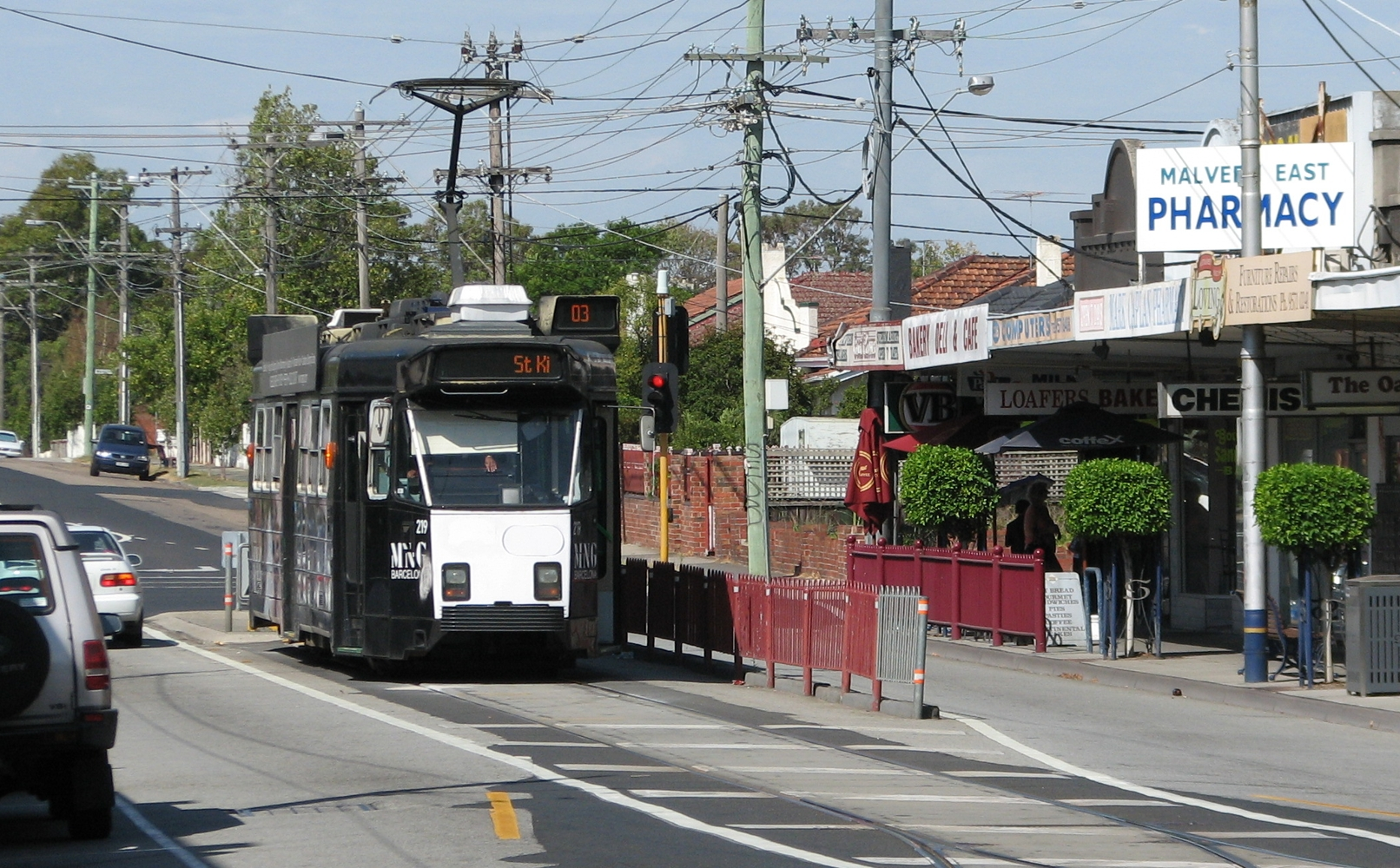
Tram route 3 terminus on Waverley Road

Malvern East is serviced by Darling, East Malvern and Holmesglen railway stations, all on the Glen Waverley line, Caulfield and Malvern railway stations on the Frankston, Cranbourne, and Pakenham lines and tram routes 3 and 5.

Bus routes 612, 623, 624, and 626 operated by CDC Melbourne also service the area.

The suburb is also serviced by the community bike path along Gardiners Creek, which joins and is an integral part, of the Greater Melbourne network of bike paths.

== Sport ==
The suburb has an Australian Rules football team, East Malvern Football Club, competing in the Southern Football League. The De La Salle Old Collegians Associated Football Club also competes at Waverley Park, on Waverley Road, in the Victorian Amateur Football Association in A Section.

Malvern East also boasts one of the largest Australian Rules Auskick clinics in Australia, which is held on Saturday mornings during winter.

Golfers play at the course of the East Malvern Golf Club, on Golfers Drive, the Malvern Valley Public Golf Course on Golfers Drive or at the course of the Nepean Golf Club, on Waverley Road.

== Notable citizens ==
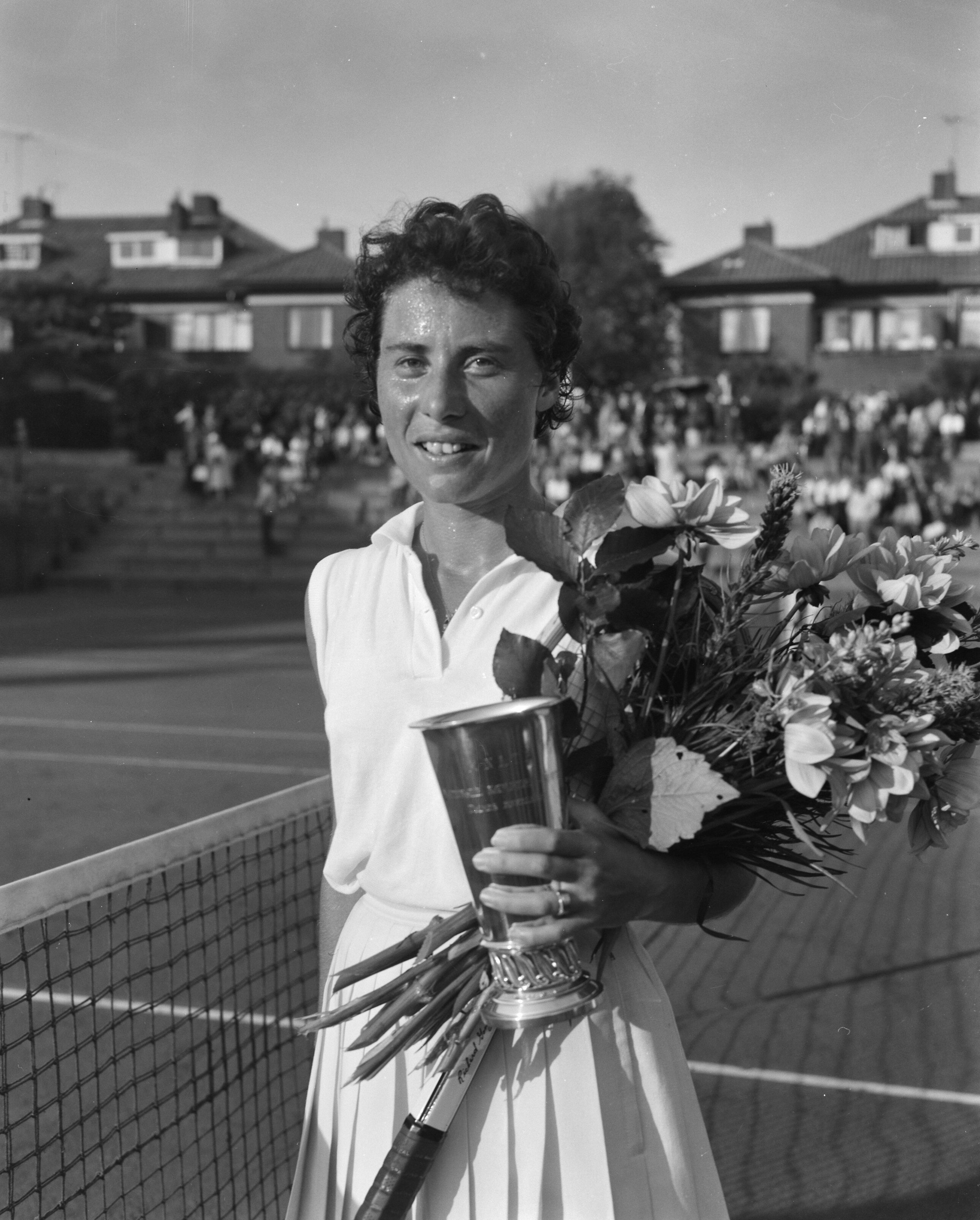
Eva Duldig

- Bruce Clarke (1925–2008), jazz guitarist, composer, and educator, lived in Malvern East
- Alan Jackson (1936–2018), Australian businessman who was the CEO of Nylex. He lived his later life in the suburb.
- Marg Downey (born 1961), actress
- Eva Duldig (born 1938), Austrian-born Australian and Dutch tennis player, author
- Karl Duldig (1902–1986), Austrian-Australian sculptor
- Slawa Duldig (1902–1975), Polish-born Austrian-Australian inventor, artist, interior designer, and teacher
- Max Holmes (born 2002), AFL player
- John Williamson Legge (1917–1996), biochemist and communist activist.
- Pia Miranda (born 1973), actress
- Bailey Smith (born 2000) – AFL player

== See also ==
- City of Malvern – Malvern East was previously within this former local government area.
