= Hover cover =

Hovercraft for covering cricket pitches

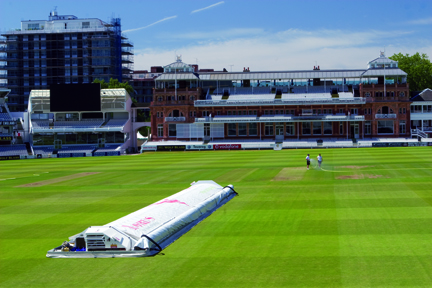
Hover cover at Lord's in 2008, with additional sheets rolled up on each side

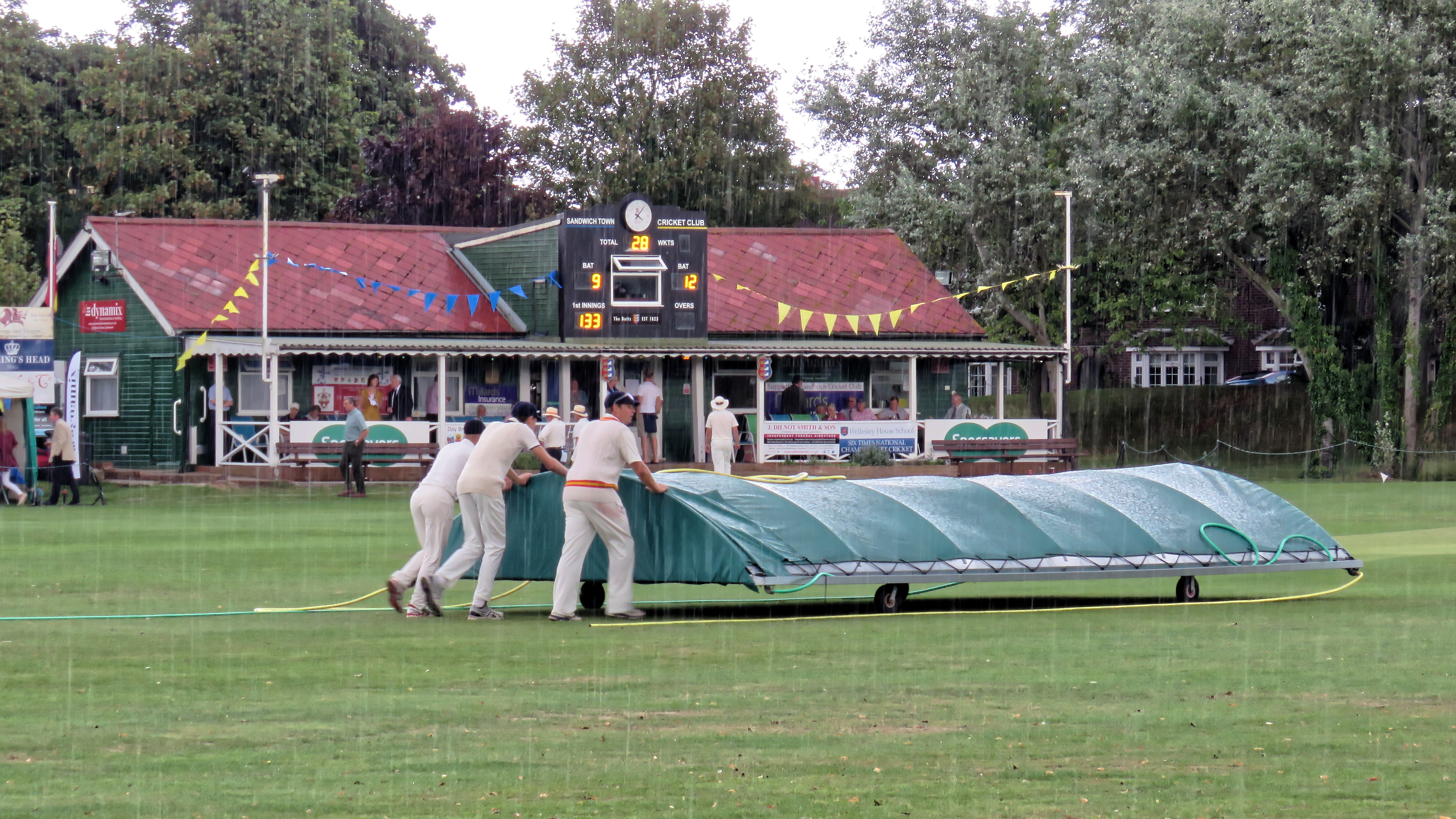
Traditional mobile covers being manually wheeled into place in a rain shower

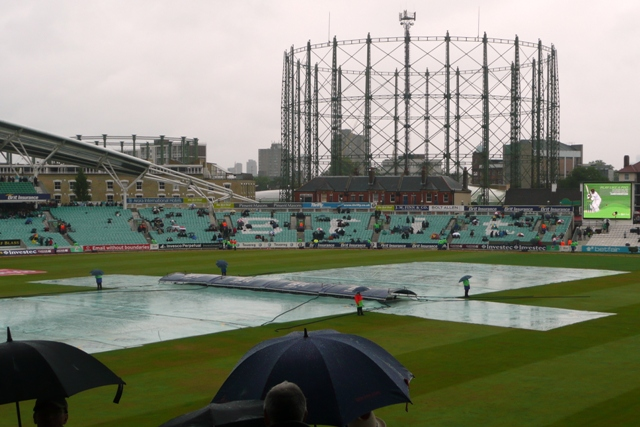
Wheeled covers and flat plastic covers in place during rain at the Oval, 2008

A hover cover is a specialised hovercraft used at major cricket grounds to cover and protect the cricket pitch from inclement weather, particularly showers of rain. The hover cover can be stored close to the edge of the cricket field, and when required can be moved over the pitch within minutes, and then removed easily when weather conditions improve. A hover cover can be used instead of more traditional wheeled covers, typically with a metal frame covered with fabric or metal, but two or three separate sections are necessary to cover the pitch completely, which take much longer and require more effort to push into place and remove.

Usually around 100 ft (30 m) long and 15 ft (4.6 m) wide, sufficient to entirely cover the pitch of 66 ft × 10 ft (20.1 m × 3.0 m), the hover cover has a petrol motor at either end driving fans which generate an air cushion to lift the device, and also provide propulsion which allows the hover cover to be moved by a few people with relatively little effort, hovering smoothly over the field of play without causing any damage. The hovercraft can also carry plastic sheets or tarpaulins which can be quickly rolled out to increase the covered area, with sheets at each end to cover the bowlers' run ups, and at either side to protect other pitches on the square. It can also incorporate gutters and drainage pipes so the collected water may be directed way from the square and towards the drains.

The concept was developed by the fabric manufacturer Stuart Canvas, which also makes and sells cricket accessories including sight screens, cricket nets, scoreboards, and wheeled covers. The first hover cover was trialled in Cheshire in 1998 and used at Lord's in 1999. The first hover cover at Lord's was replaced with a new model in 2020. Hover covers are used at most Test cricket grounds in the UK, including Edgbaston, Trent Bridge, Old Trafford, Sophia Gardens in Cardiff, and the Rose Bowl near Southampton, and at some grounds outside the UK, including the Sher-e-Bangla National Cricket Stadium at Dakha in Bangladesh and the Maharashtra Cricket Association Stadium at Pune in India.

== See also ==
- Brumbrella, the large mechanical cover at Edgbaston
- Super Sopper – mechanised rolling sponge
