= Brumbrella =

Cricket pitch cover at Edgbaston

Coordinates: 52°27′20.93″N 1°54′08.96″W

The Brumbrella was a large pitch covering used at the Edgbaston Cricket Ground, Birmingham, England from 1981 to 2001. Its name is a portmanteau word derived from "Brum"—a nickname for Birmingham, reflecting its location—and "umbrella", reflecting its function in protecting the pitch from rain.

The Brumbrella was praised and criticised - its speed of deployment helped groundstaff protect the pitch quickly, but as a flat protector, it was prone to "sweating". It was deemed to have contributed to the Edgbaston pitch's deterioration, and its demise was hastened by legislation against flat covers.

It was briefly replaced by "Son of Brumbrella", but today the groundstaff rely on manpower to manoeuvre the covers onto the Edgbaston pitch.

== Description ==
The Brumbrella comprised a flat rainproof covering which was mechanically unrolled across the playing surface to protect the pitch and most of the outfield from rain. The motorised roller was intended to allow the cover to be rapidly deployed in bad weather, and then removed when the weather improved, so play could continue as quickly as possible, but this was not always achieved:

It stretched from one side of the ground to the other, across the full length of the cricket table and part of the outfield. At the time it was a very innovative piece of equipment, but had its problems. It was so heavy, and took so long to unroll, that it became impractical. By the time it had completed its journey, the shower that it was supposed to be protecting the surface from, had passed, dumping its load on the way! Eventually, when it broke down during a county game, it was decided to return to the more practical method of covering the entire cricket square and run ups with plastic sheeting and roll on roll off covers.

The original mechanism, a large section of North Sea oil pipeline wrapped with a tarpaulin and weighing some 6 tons, was installed in the winter of 1980 having been designed by Terry Rutter of Sports Ground Consultants. The £43,380 cost was met by the Warwickshire County Cricket Club Supporters' Association. It was first used during a heavy rain shower in England's second One-day International against Australia on 6 June 1981.When the surface water had been removed by the roller wrapped cover, Umpire Dickie Bird met cover designer Terry Rutter on the pitch and said "let's get them back on shall we"? It was prone to malfunction once the cover fabric had been changed, notably suffering damage on the first day of the 1990 Edgbaston Test match, which prevented its use for the duration of the five-day match.

== Anti-moisture policy ==
In 1999, the ECB introduced a policy against "flat" covers, which can encourage moisture to sweat out of a damp pitch, making batting more difficult, and opposing captains were given the right to object to its use. The Brumbrella continued in use for a little while longer, but, after 20 years of use, it was replaced in early 2001. Parts were given away to Warwickshire clubs to use as covers, including Moseley Ashfield, and a "massive section" was acquired by Atherstone Town Cricket Club. The Brumbrella was also blamed, in part, for a deterioration in the condition of the Edgbaston pitch.

== Replacement ==
The new mechanism—dubbed "Son of Brumbrella"—cost around £80,000 and was much lighter, weighing only one ton. It had two motorised rollers, housed in trenches on either side of the outfield, and was operated by remote control. However, it proved temperamental in use, and malfunctioned several times. It failed before the first County Championship match of the season against Hampshire on 20–23 April, and a second time on 2 June, during the third day of Warwickshire's third home Championship match against Gloucestershire, and the groundstaff returned to manual covers for England's One-day International against Pakistan on 7 June. However, the groundstaff struggled to deploy and remove manual covers quickly during the rain-affected Ashes Test on 5–8 July 2001. The new Brumbrella was abandoned later that year and returned to its manufacturers, Tildenet, who refunded its cost to Warwickshire. Edgbaston groundsman Steve Rouse subsequently explained that it became too heavy to use once it was covered with water. Edgbaston now boasts a new rain protection system called a "hover cover" based on the hovercraft principle, that covers the wicket only but also has flaps that roll out on four sides to also protect the rest of the cricket square, as seen live on UK television 7 August 2010, England v Pakistan 2nd test at Edgbaston

== Legacy ==
Since the Brumbrella's demise, Edgbaston officials have been "unable to find a suitable replacement they now have to rely on the fast legged groundsmen." On a Test match day, Rouse's "normal staff of six rises to around 20, the extra hands principally used for getting the pitch covers on and off quickly."

Despite having been retired in 2001, the Brumbrella remains a point of reference for the efficient covering of cricket pitches: Derek Pringle in The Daily Telegraph and Mike Selvey in The Guardian both favourably compared the efficient performance of the groundstaff at Kandy during England's Test match against Sri Lanka in December 2007 to it.
