= Super Sopper =

Sports field cleaning equipment

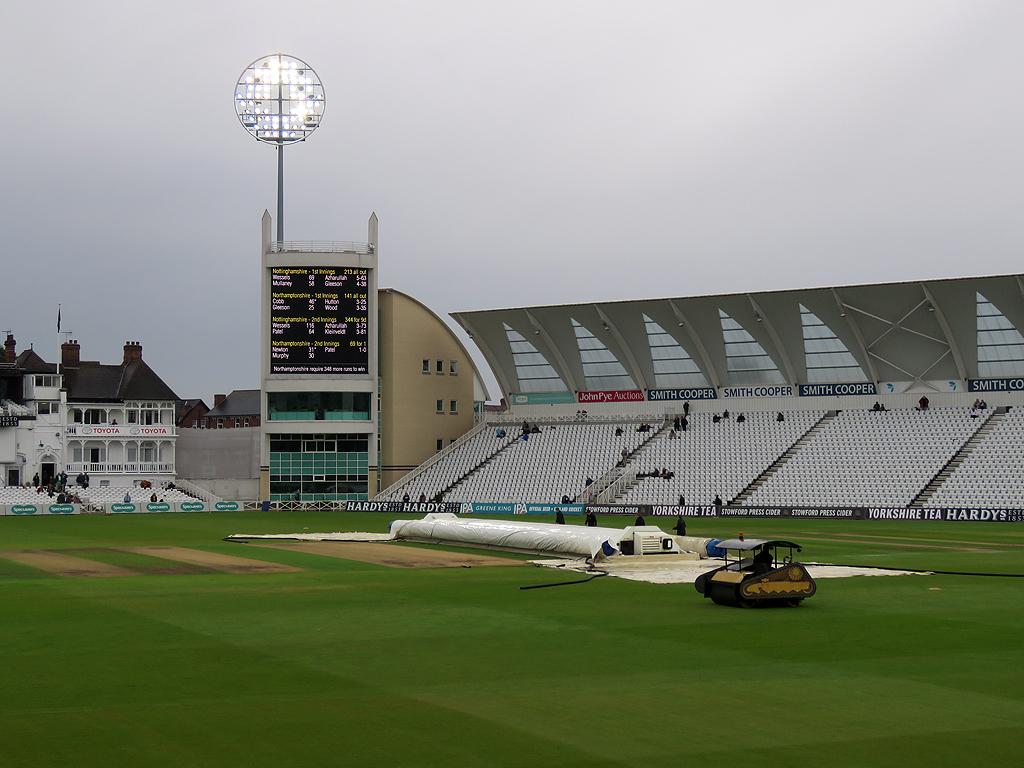
Super Sopper passing a hover cover and other covers at Trent Bridge in 2017

The Super Sopper is a rolling sponge used to remove water from sports grounds, particularly cricket fields, but also golf greens, tennis courts, racecourses, and other sports venues. The device can also be used to remove surface water from other spaces open to the elements, including hard courts and floors at building sites, to allow activities to continue without having to wait for the area to be dry out or be cleared of water by other means.

== History ==
The concept was invented in Australia in 1974 by Gordon Withnall when he was 80 years old, after his golf ball landed in a puddle of water while he was playing a round of golf near Liverpool, New South Wales. He recognised the need for some means to collect surplus water from the grass at sports fields, to allow the sports to continue more quickly and effectively after a shower of rain. His invention initially attached sponges to the rotating drum of a manual lawn roller, with perforations in the metal drum allowing the water to be collected in an internal tank. The invention was featured on the ABC-TV show The Inventors in 1974 but did not win the programme. Withnall moved on to a vehicle similar to a road roller, with wide water-collecting rollers at each end, developed for Melbourne Cricket Ground in 1979, and then exported to the Oval in London. Many hundreds were sold to schools in Japan by Withnall's company, Kuranda Manufacturing, which is now run by his son Len Withnall.

== Mechanism ==
A full-size Super Sopper typically comprises a small motorised vehicle with large rollers at each end. The outside surfaces of each roller are covered with a spongy water-absorbing material, such as polyurethane foam. The large rollers collect water as they roll over the ground, and the continuing rotary motion of each rollers takes the water-filled sponge past a smaller hard roller rotating in the opposite direction, which squeeze the water out of the sponge and into a storage tank, allowing the large rollers to collect more water when they return to the ground again. When the tank is filled, the collected water can be emptied into a drain. Water is collected in a continuous process as the vehicle moves forward, supplementing any drainage installed in the ground, and allowing sporting activities to resume more quickly after interruptions for rain. Smaller versions with one roller can be towed or pushed by hand. Similar devices exist, such as the "Supersopper" made in India. It takes around 40 to 45 minutes to remove the water from fields of cricket ground.
