= Edgbaston Cricket Ground =

Cricket ground in the Edgbaston area of Birmingham, England

Coordinates: 52°27′21″N 1°54′9″W

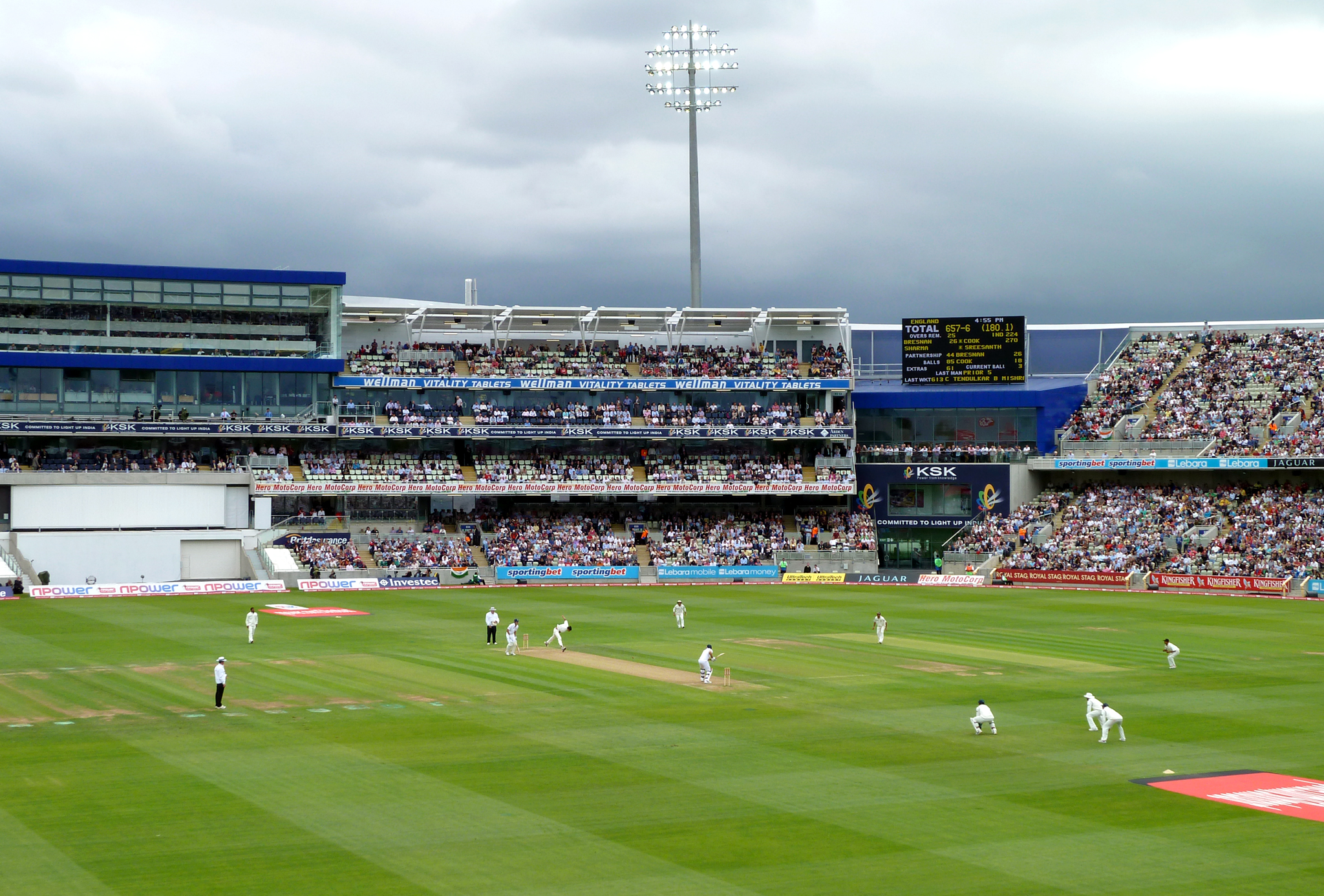
- During a test match against India in 2011
- Interactive map of Edgbaston Cricket Ground

Ground information
- Location: Edgbaston, Birmingham
- Country: England
- Establishment: 1882
- Capacity: 25,000
- End names
- Birmingham End (previously City End) Pavilion End

International information
- First men's Test: 29–31 May 1902: England v Australia
- Last men's Test: 9–12 September 2026: England v Pakistan
- First men's ODI: 28 August 1972: England v Australia
- Last men's ODI: 14 July 2026: England v India
- First men's T20I: 5 July 2010: Australia v Pakistan
- Last men's T20I: 25 May 2024: England v Pakistan
- First women's Test: 15–18 June 1963: England v Australia
- Last women's Test: 1–3 July 1979: England v West Indies
- Only women's ODI: 28 July 1973: England v Australia
- First women's T20I: 7 September 2014: England v South Africa
- Last women's T20I: 17 June 2026: Pakistan v South Africa

Team information
Warwickshire CCC	(1894 – present)
Birmingham Bears	(2014 – present)
Birmingham Phoenix	(2021 – present)
Central Sparks	(2020 – present)
- As of 12 July 2025; Source: ESPN Cricinfo

Edgbaston Cricket Ground in the Edgbaston area of Birmingham, England, is home to Warwickshire County Cricket Club. Edgbaston has also been the venue for Test matches, One-Day Internationals and Twenty20 Internationals. Edgbaston has hosted the T20 Finals Day more than any other cricket ground. Edgbaston is the main home ground for the Birmingham Phoenix in The Hundred competition from 2021. With permanent seating for approximately 25,000 spectators, it is the third-largest cricketing venue in England, after Lord's and The Oval.

Edgbaston has played host to matches in major tournaments as it hosted matches in the ICC Cricket World Cup 2019 where England won its first World Cup and the ICC Champions Trophy 2017 where Pakistan won.

Edgbaston also hosted the first women's T20 event at the 2022 Commonwealth Games where Australia won the gold medal match.

Edgbaston was the venue of the first senior game under floodlights in English cricket in 1997, between Warwickshire and Somerset in the AXA Life Sunday League, and hosted the first day/night Test match in England in 2017 when England played the West Indies.

== History ==
=== Early history ===
The land that now makes up Edgbaston Cricket Ground was originally owned by the Calthorpe Estate, who have now sold the site onto Wylam Investments (Edgbaston Holdings) on a long lease. Calthorpe Estates had developed the manor of Edgbaston into an exclusive Birmingham suburb over the course of the 19th century, and believed that a cricket ground would be an asset that would add to the genteel image of the area. Warwickshire County Cricket Club had considered Rugby and Leamington Spa for their headquarters, but club secretary William Ansell believed that Birmingham's large population and comprehensive railway connections made it preferable – envisaging first-class status for the county and Test status for the ground.

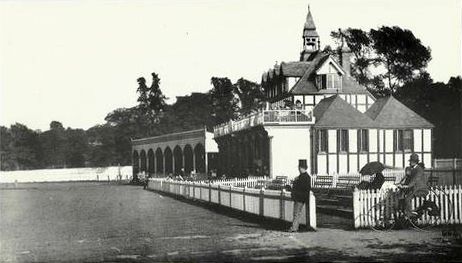
The Pavilion and East Stand in 1895

The club had initially favoured the Wycliffe Ground on Pershore Road, but were instead offered a 12-acre "meadow of rough grazing land" in an undeveloped area on the banks of the River Rea by the Calthorpe Estate – the less attractive development land having more to gain from association with the cricket ground. With the site only 20 minutes' walk from New Street Station, Warwickshire agreed in 1885 to lease the land for £5 per acre over a 21-year period. A further £1,250 was spent on draining and enclosing the site and building a wooden pavilion. The new ground's first match took place on 7 June 1886 against the MCC, watched by 3,000 spectators over two days, with 6,000 turning out on 9 and 10 August to watch Warwickshire play Australia.

Edgbaston's first Test match was the first in The Ashes series against Australia in 1902, for which the club erected a permanent stand, two temporary stands and facilities for 90 members of the press. These developments cost a total of £1,500, however, and Warwickshire's share of the tour funds was only £750.

=== Post-war development ===
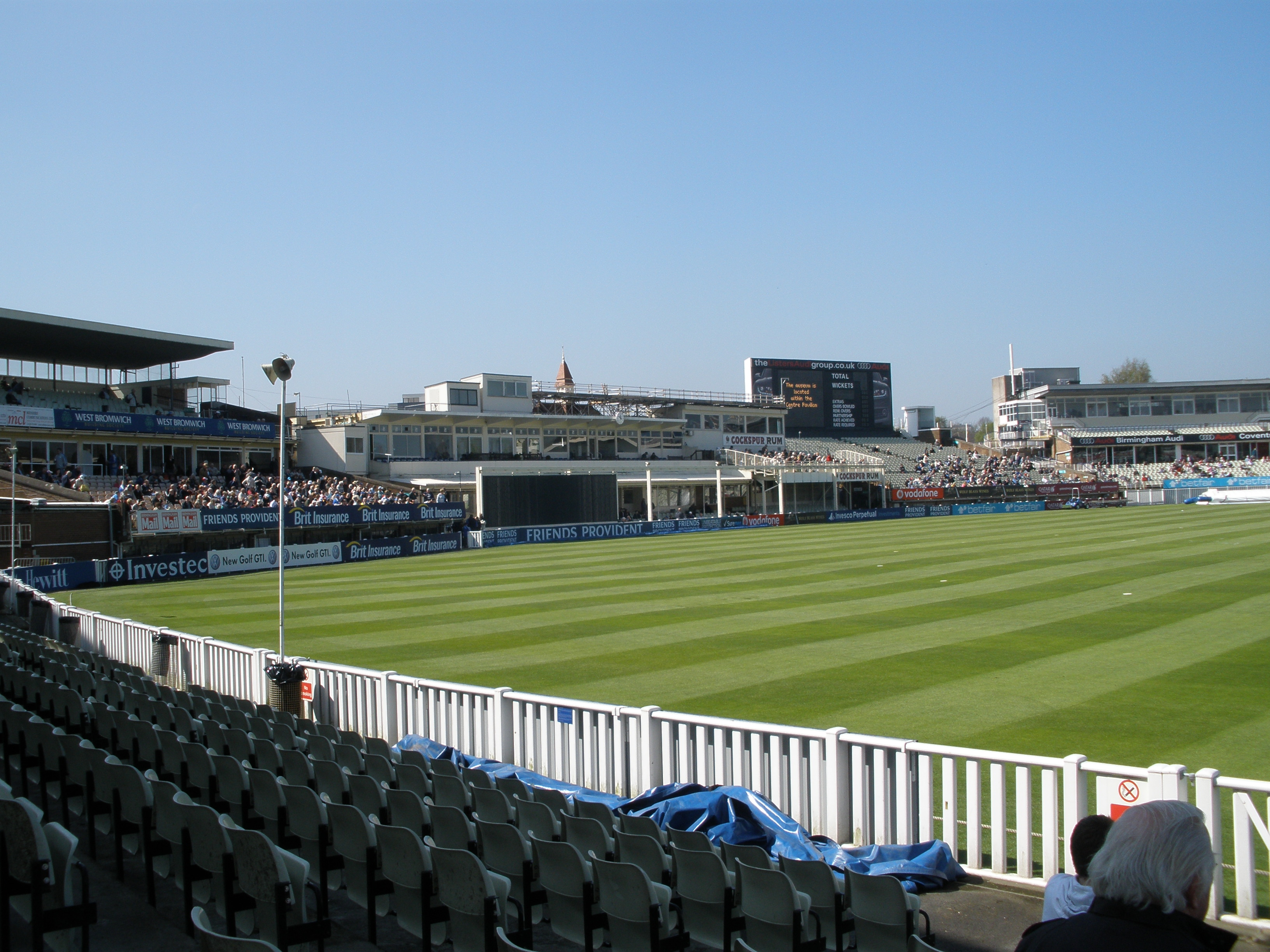
Edgbaston in 2008: the former Pavilion, Leslie Deakins and R. V. Ryder Stands, all now demolished

The first piece of development in the post-war era was the construction of the Rea Bank and the Thwaite Memorial Scoreboard in 1950. In 1956 an Indoor Cricket School was built and the Pavilion Suite was completed in the same year. By the time the William Ansell Stand opened in 1967 the facilities at Edgbaston were considered to rival those at Lord's.

In 1989 executive boxes were added to the rear of the Priory and Raglan Stands and the Stanley Barnes Stand was reconstructed and enlarged, expanding the ground capacity of 17,500.

In July 1997, Edgbaston was the scene of the first competitive floodlit day-night cricket match in Britain.

The pavilion end on the south side of the ground was completely redeveloped between 2010 and 2011 at a cost of £32 million, partly paid for from a £20 million loan from Birmingham City Council, bringing the ground's capacity up to 25,000. Demolition of the pavilion – parts of which dated back to the 1890s – and the Leslie Deakins, R. V. Ryder and William Ansell Stands took place in January 2010, with construction of the new South and West Stands starting in April 2010 and reaching completion 66 weeks later. 5 permanent floodlight pylons were erected around the ground at the same time, allowing up to 15 days of day-night cricket annually. The new development was officially opened by the Duke of Edinburgh on 25 July 2011. The first test match to be played at the redeveloped venue was the third Test vs India on 10 August 2011, which saw England reach the number 1 position in the ICC Test Championship for the first time with victory by an innings and 242 runs on the fourth day of the match.

== Ground ==
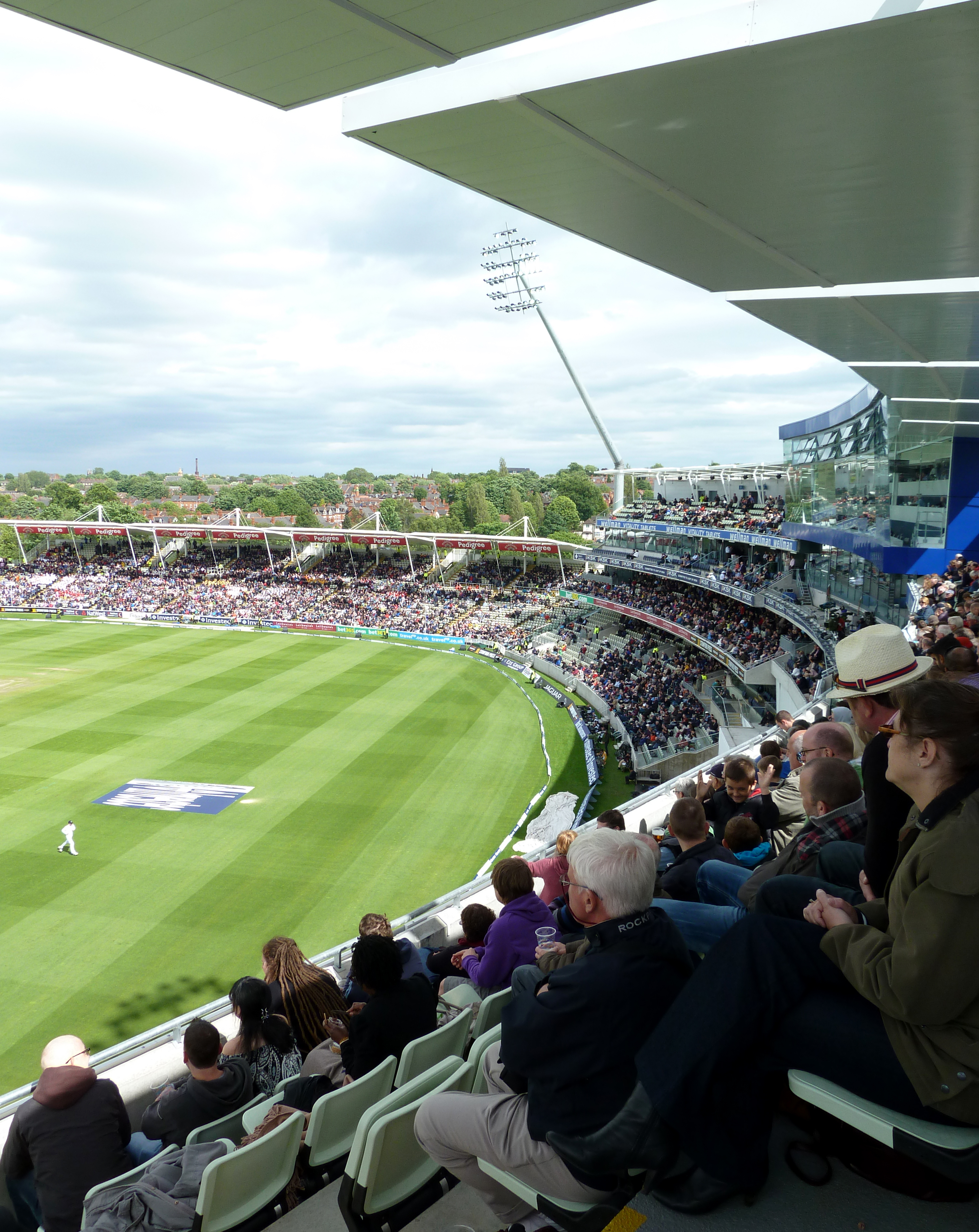
The Eric Hollies and South Stands and the Press Box

Edgbaston is considered to be one of England's leading cricket grounds. Wisden's guide to cricket grounds in 1992 commented that "Lord's is really its only superior in the United Kingdom" with The Daily Telegraph agreeing in 2009 that "taken all in all, it is now the best ground outside Lord's". After the opening of the new South and West Stands in 2011 the England and Wales Cricket Board commented that "the spacious facilities are cutting edge, marginally better than the Home of Cricket".

The atmosphere at Edgbaston is reputed to be the most hostile in England for visiting teams. Former England captain Alec Stewart recalled "On a world level I would put it up there with Eden Gardens in Calcutta, which holds about 100,000. It inspires a team. It's like having another man in your side." and the former England wicketkeeper Geraint Jones describes how "The crowd here makes such a big noise when you are doing well ... it's a unique environment". After winning the 2015 Ashes Test Match with Australia at Edgbaston, England captain Alastair Cook commented "The Edgbaston crowd was up there with the loudest I can remember. With some of the chants, even guys who have played a fair bit of cricket were looking at each other and realising how special it was. Edgbaston has been a fantastic venue for us."

The record attendance at a County Championship match at Edgbaston is 28,000 against Lancashire in the championship-winning season of 1951, and the record for a single day of a test match is 32,000 against the West Indies in 1957.

For some years until 2000, Edgbaston had a distinctive motorized rain cover system, known as the Brumbrella.

=== Stands and spectator facilities ===
- South Stand. Built over the site of the previous pavilion in 2011, the stand is a multi-tiered structure which holds the Press Box, hospitality suites, players changing rooms, administration offices, Visitor and Learning Centre, the Club shop and banqueting halls. The South Stand (Pavilion) has a seating capacity of over 4,000 spectators.
- West Stand. Built in 2011 on the site of the previous William Ansell Stand, the West Stand has two large tiers of seating. Adjacent to the south is the Edgbaston Suite – a 750-seat banqueting and exhibition space whose bright blue presence is a distinctive feature of both the inside and the outside of the ground – above which facing the pitch is a large electronic scoreboard.

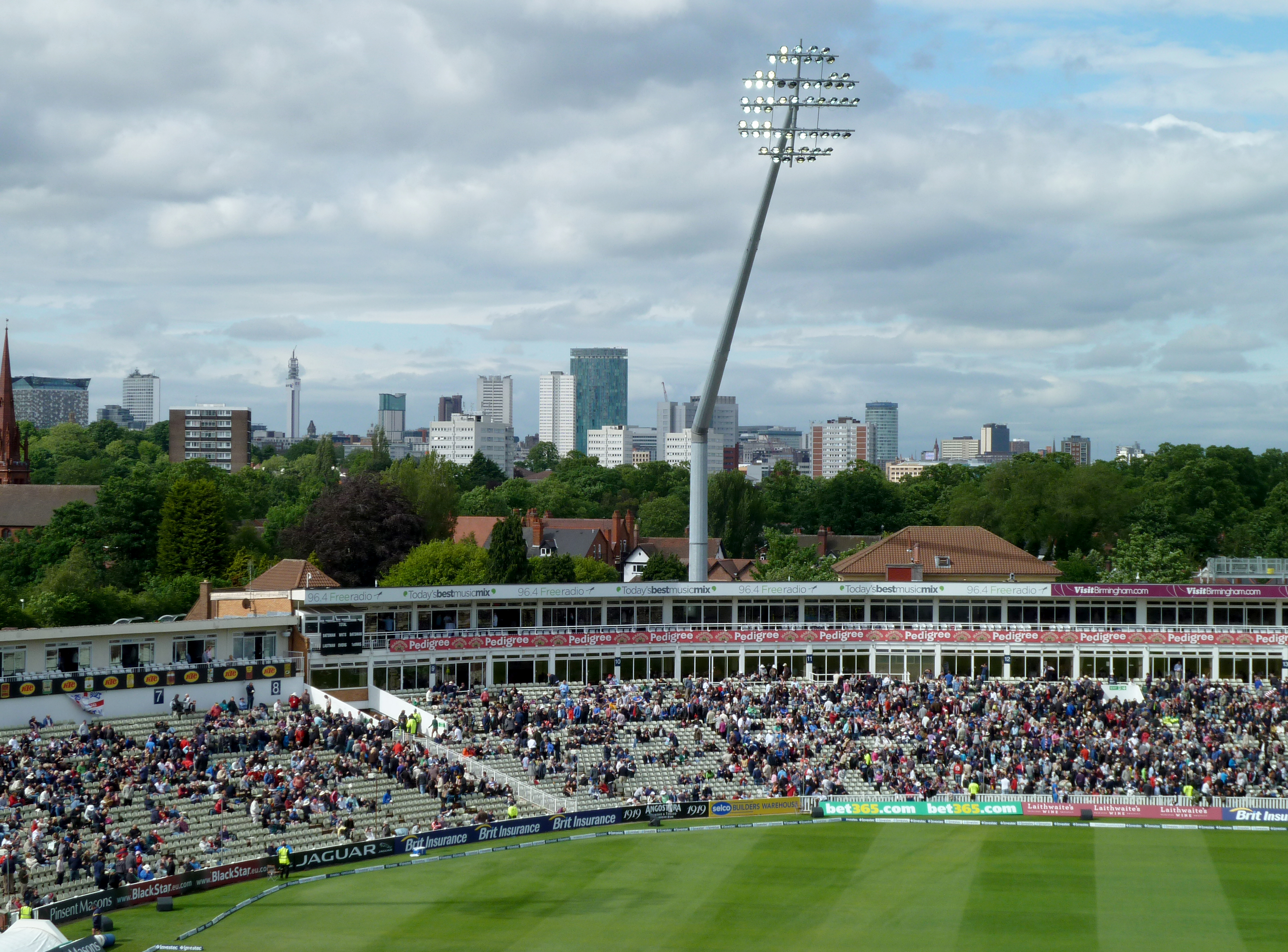
The Raglan and R. E. S. Wyatt Stands, with Birmingham City Centre in the distance

- Drayton Manor Family Stand – (Priory Stand). This is the main family stand at Edgbaston and was renamed in 2014 with a sponsorship deal with Drayton Manor Theme Park. It has a single tier structure and is between the West and Raglan Stands. The environment of this stand is designed to be suitable for families with children.
- Raglan Stand. This is a single tier structure and is parallel to the wicket on the opposite side to the Eric Hollies Stand. The Raglan Stand is the location of the Aylesford Hospitality Boxes situated at the rear overlooking the ground.
- R. E. S. Wyatt Stand. Built at the City End in 1995 and named after the Warwickshire and England all-rounder Bob Wyatt, who died that year, the R. E. S. Wyatt Stand consists of a single tier of seating beneath two rows of executive boxes. Facilities in the stand include two pitch-view restaurants: the Marston's Suite and the Executive Club, together with the David Heath Suite, currently used by Warwickshire members.
- Scrivens (Press Box) Stand. Built in 1957 and first used for that year's test match against the West Indies, this stand was given to the club by Langton Iliffe, 2nd Baron Iliffe and his fellow directors of the Coventry Evening Telegraph. It hosted the ground's press facilities until the opening of the new South Stand in 2011. A two tier stand, it is allocated as an alcohol-free family area for top-class matches. Now named the Scrivens Stand after a sponsorship deal with Scrivens Opticians.
- Stanley Barnes Stand. A small single tier stand opened in 1989, the Stanley Barnes Stand is situated in front of the Thwaite Memorial Scoreboard, the ground's most distinctive feature.
- Eric Hollies Stand. Formerly known as the Rea Bank, after the River Rea which runs immediately to its rear, this is traditionally the most raucous area of the ground. The stand was renamed after the Warwickshire and England leg-spinner Eric Hollies in 1989, and was rebuilt in 2003 with 5,900 seats, an increase of 1,300 over its predecessor. The design won a 2003 Civic Trust Award, and British Constructional Steelwork Association Structural Steel Award. It features a series of eight aluminium sunshades suspended over the single tier of seating on simple steel masts, appearing to hover over the crowd beneath.

Both the Drayton Manor Family Stand (Priory Stand), and Raglan Stand are two stands to be rebuilt as part of ongoing development.

=== Hotel ===
In 2025, construction began to redevelop the west side of the stadium to construct an adjoining hotel at an estimated cost of £46 million, including a £18 million contribution from the West Midlands Combined Authority. By demolishing the Priory and Raglan stands, the development will result in a new 146-room hotel, 85 of these rooms overlooking the pitch. The hotel would be opened as part of the Radisson RED range of 4-star offerings. When completed, the new replacement stand is expected to seat 3200, offer improved accessibility and a covered concourse, and is to be completed in time for the 2027 Men's Ashes.

=== Gallery ===
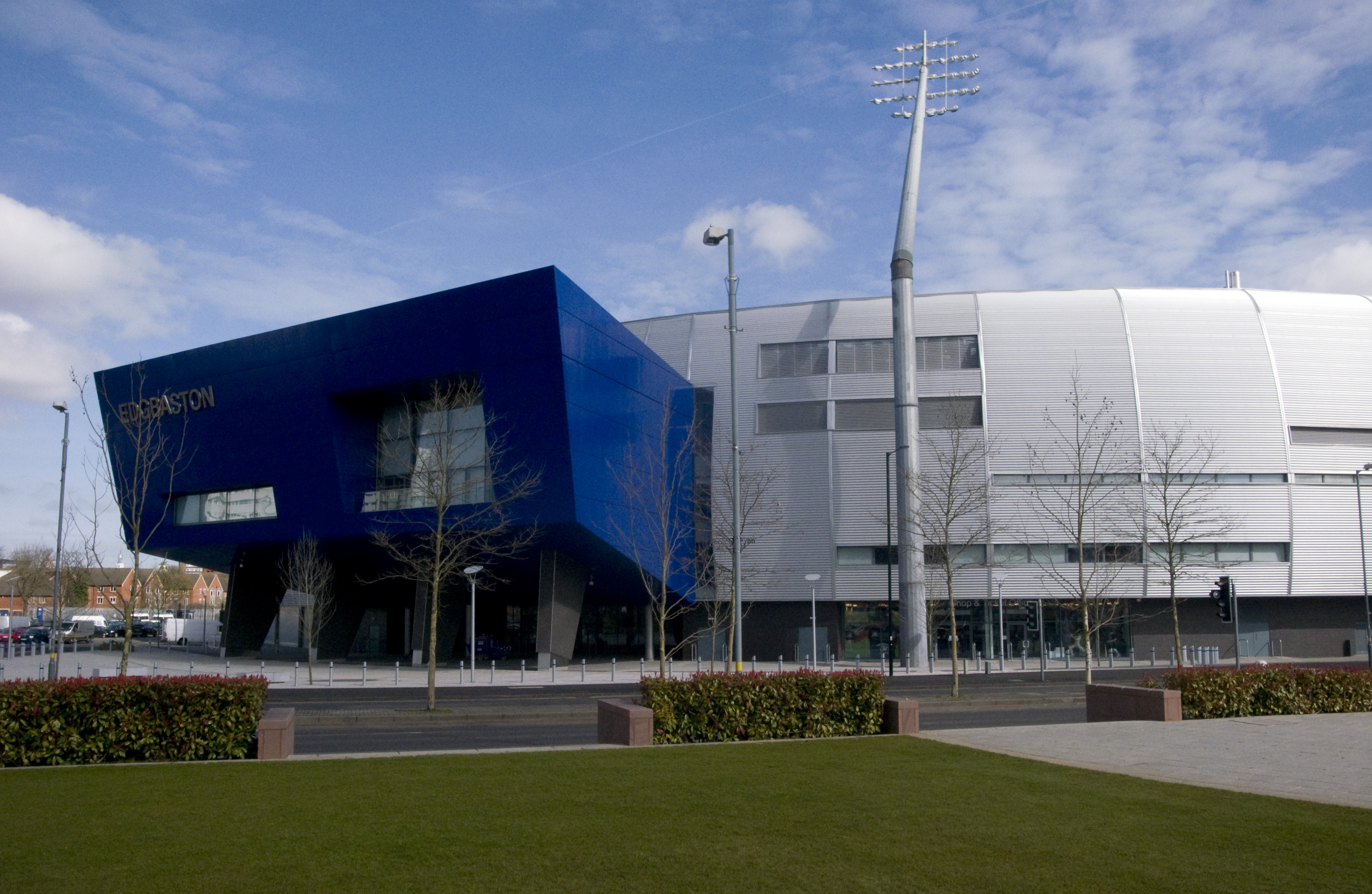
The main entrance on Edgbaston Road

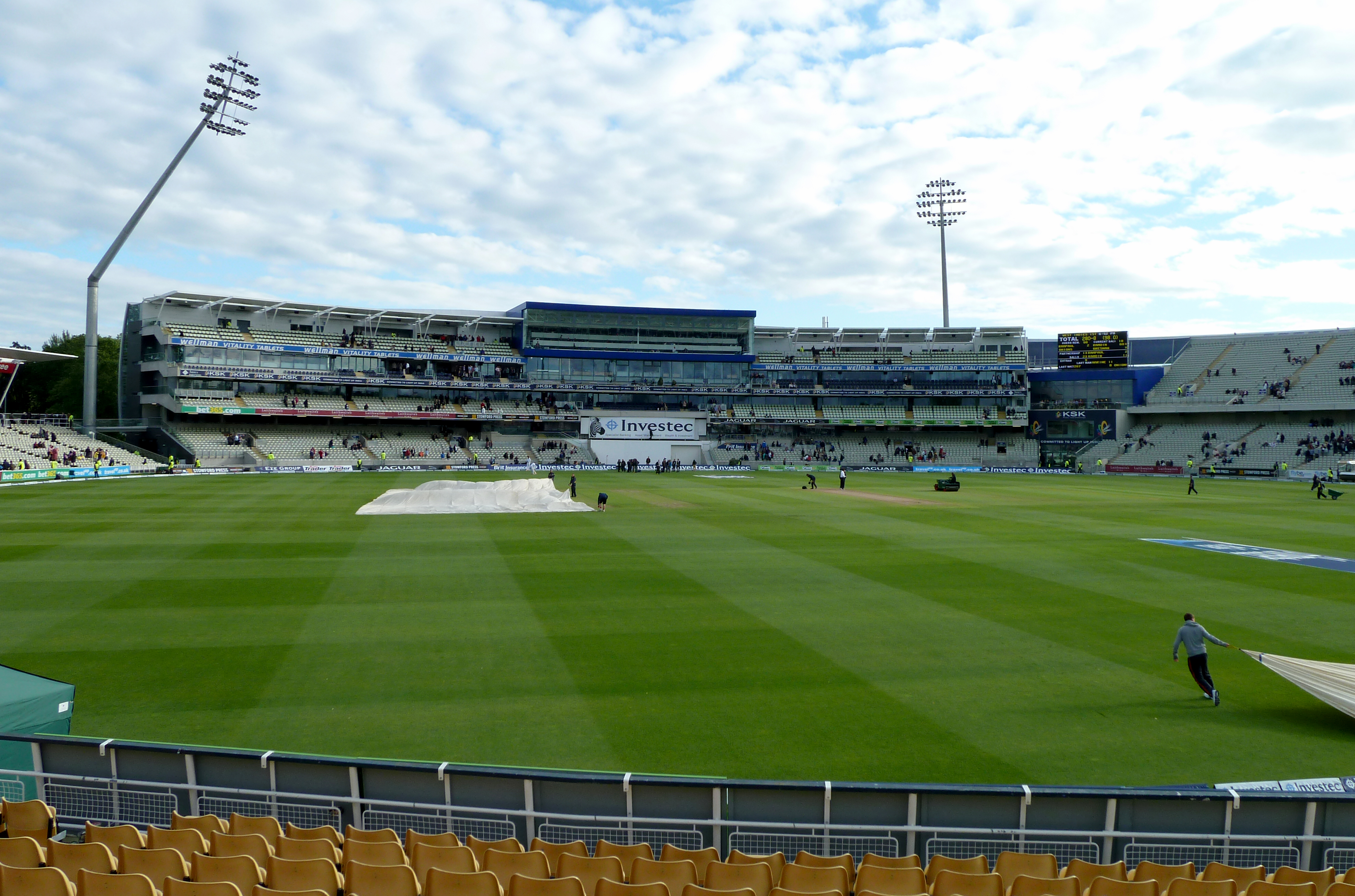
The South and West Stands at close of play

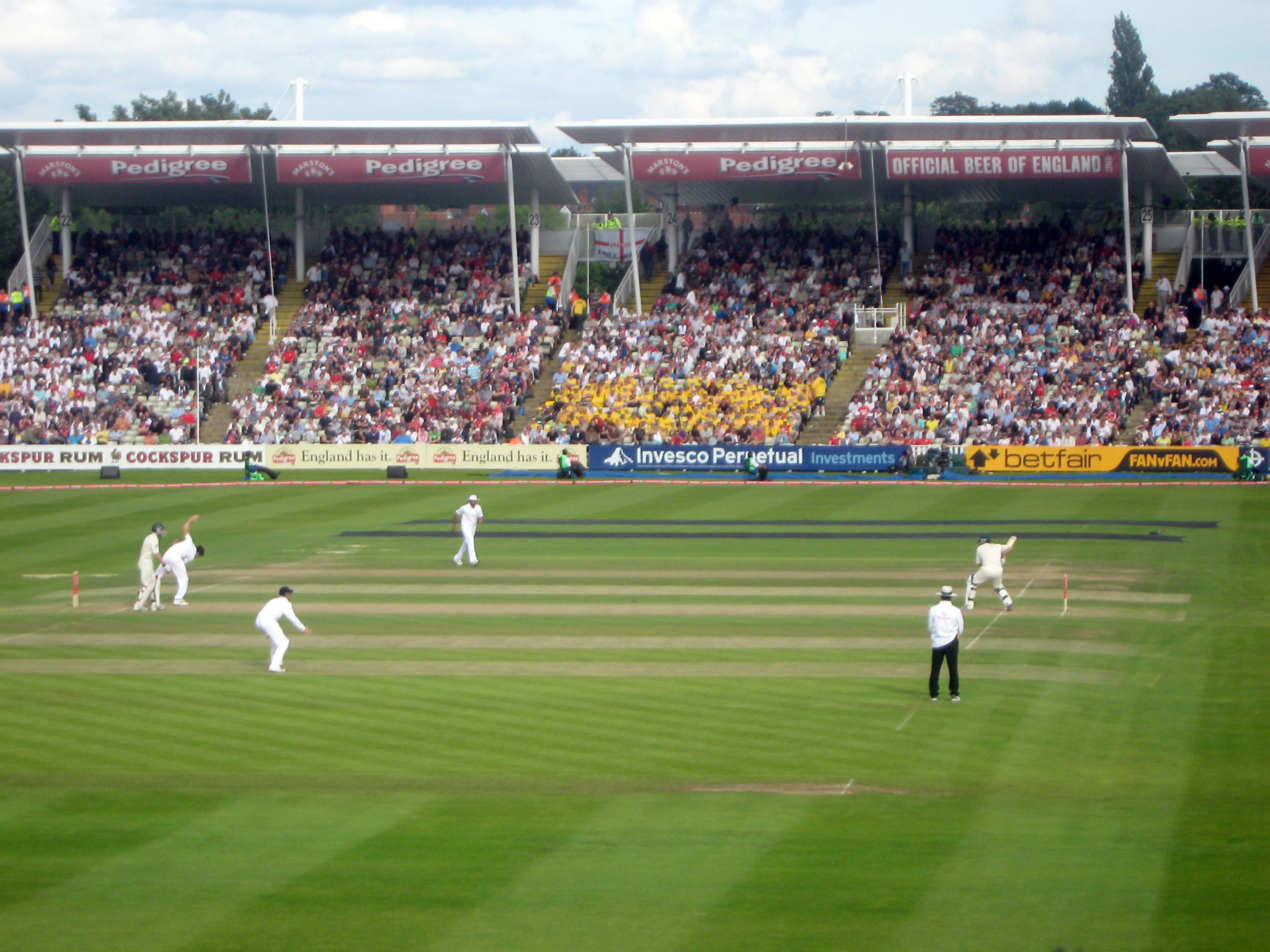
The Eric Hollies Stand is the home of Edgbaston's most passionate and vociferous spectators.

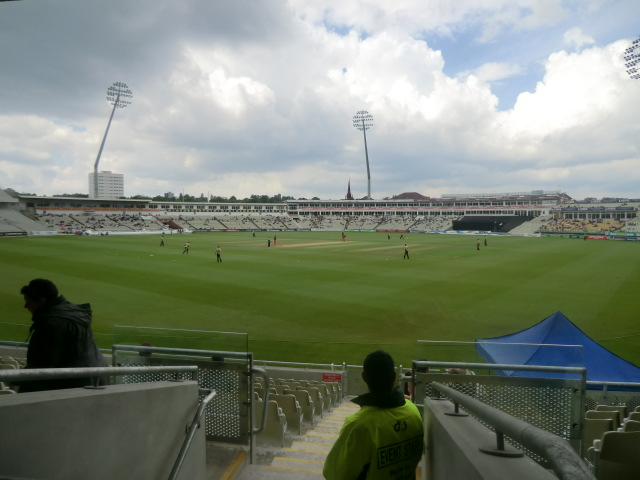
Rain stops play, July 2012

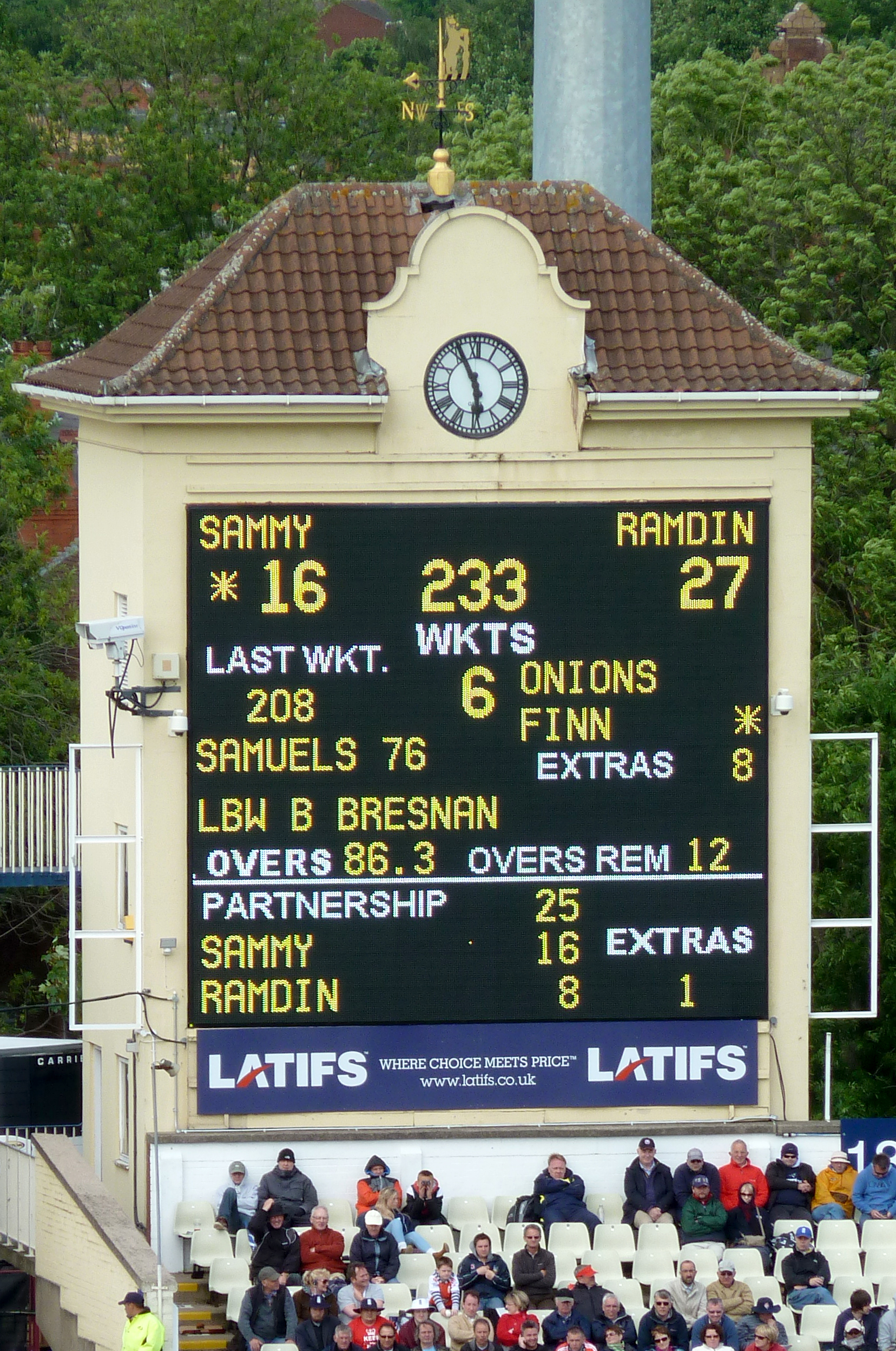
Thwaite Memorial scoreboard

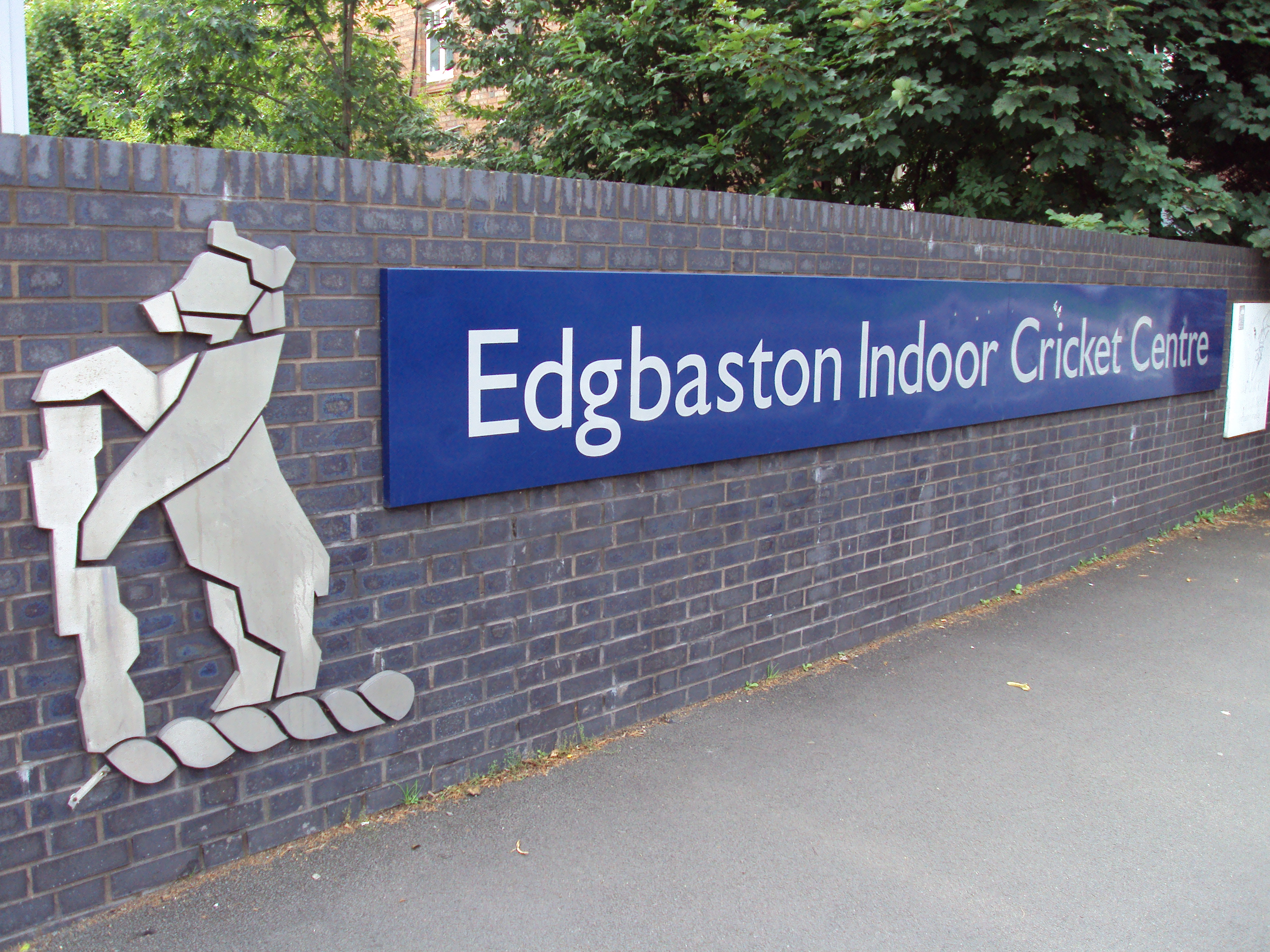
Entrance to the Indoor Cricket Centre

=== Other facilities ===
- Indoor Cricket Centre. Fronting the Pershore Road side of the ground, the Indoor Cricket Centre was opened by the Duke of Edinburgh in 2000, replacing an earlier indoor cricket school of 1956. Its 41 m × 32 m main hall accommodates either eight net lanes for indoor cricket practice or two six-a-side pitches. The building also houses a small shop, a bar with an outdoor terrace and offices for regional, youth and disabled cricket boards.
- Visitor & Learning Centre. Created by Museum Curator Phil Britt and opened in 2011 the V & L was situated on the mezzanine level of the South Stand, the 300 m^{2} Visitor & Learning Centre as an interactive display charting the history of Warwickshire County Cricket Club and of test match cricket at Edgbaston. The experience was introduced with a five-minute film giving a short overview of the history of the club and ground in a small theatre area, and included audio and film records of key moments and figures from Warwickshire's past, and interactive installations demonstrating cricketing techniques and allowing visitors to test their judgement against that of test match umpires. The centre was favourably reviewed by The Independent when it opened in 2011. Commenting on how "the rich history of the club and the ground are told simply, straightforwardly and accessibly", the review concluded by comparing it to the equivalent at Lord's: "The museum at Lord's is cramped and gives an air of scholarly dinginess ... maybe they could learn a lesson or two from Edgbaston now." Despite this the V & L Centre was closed in 2018 and the area used for Corporate entertainment
- Museum and Library. This is now the only museum on site and is a more traditional museum, housing the club's collection of cricketing memorabilia – one of the largest and most important in the country – and its cricketing library, opened underneath the R. E. S. Wyatt Stand in 2012.
- Colts' Ground. On the east side of the River Rea, to the rear of the Eric Hollies Stand, the smaller Colts' Ground is used for cricket practice and minor matches.

== Notable moments ==
- 1886 – Warwickshire's first match at Edgbaston took place on 7 June against the MCC, watched by 3,000 spectators over two days.
- 1886 – 6,000 spectators turn out on 9 and 10 August to watch Warwickshire play Australia.
- 1902 – First Test match at Edgbaston was England v. Australia and was drawn due to rain, with England making Australia follow on after bowling them out in the first innings for 36. Wilfred Rhodes had bowling figures of 7 for 17.
- 1957 – Stand of 411 between Peter May and Colin Cowdrey against the West Indies, England's highest-ever partnership.
- 1973 – England women's cricket team beat Australia by 92 runs in the final group match at Edgbaston to win the first Women's World Cup. The limited overs tournament was a round robin event with the winners of the final scheduled match becoming champions. Australia were top and England were second in the group going into the match with a one-point difference.
- 1975 – Hosted group matches in the 1975 ICC Cricket World Cup
- 1979 – Hosted group matches in the 1979 ICC Cricket World Cup
- 1981 – England beat Australia to take a 2–1 lead in the Ashes. Australia needed 151 in their second innings to win but were bowled out for 121 with Ian Botham taking 5 wickets in 28 balls, later Botham said the Edgbaston crowd had inspired his performance in a match where no batsman on either side made a 50.
- 1983 – Hosted group matches in the 1983 ICC Cricket World Cup
- 1994 – Brian Lara scored 501* for Warwickshire against Durham, the highest score by a batsman in first-class cricket.
- 1997 – Warwickshire beat Somerset by 35 runs at Edgbaston in the first senior limited overs match to be played under floodlights in England.
- 1999 – Australia tie with South Africa in the 1999 ICC Cricket World Cup semi final.
- 2004 – Marcus Trescothick becomes the first player to score a century in both innings of a Test match at Edgbaston, against the West Indies, scoring 105 & 107 for England.
- 2005 – Australia lose to England by two runs in the second Test of the 2005 Ashes, the closest Ashes match ever.
- 2008 – South Africa secure their first series win in England since 1965, chasing down 281 to win the third Test, the highest ever successful pursuit at this ground. South African captain Graeme Smith scored 154* to lead his team to victory.
- 2011 – Alastair Cook scores 294 against India, as England become the number one ranked Test team. England also make the highest innings score in a Test match at Edgbaston, with 710 for 7.
- 2012 – Tino Best scores 95 for the West Indies against England, the then record highest score for a number 11 batsmen. This notably formed part of a 143 run partnership with Denesh Ramdin, the third-highest Test stand with one wicket remaining.
- 2013 – India crowned ICC Champions Trophy winners following a nail-biting 5-run victory over England.
- 2014 – Edgbaston hosts its sixth NatWest t20 Blast Finals Day, with Birmingham Bears being crowned champions on their home ground for the first time in Warwickshire's history.
- 2015 – England score 408, their highest score ever in a One-Day International (ODI) 50 overs match, against New Zealand. England also recorded their biggest margin of victory of 210 runs in the same match.
- 2015 – Brendon McCullum scores 158 not out off 64 balls for Birmingham Bears against Derbyshire in a domestic T20 group match. It was the highest score in English domestic T20 history and second-highest ever score in any T20 match.
- 2016 – The opening partnership of 256 by Jason Roy and Alex Hales for England against Sri Lanka is the highest successful run chase without losing a wicket in ODI history. It is also the highest partnership for England for any wicket in ODIs and only the second time both openers have scored a century for England in the same ODI.
- 2017 – Edgbaston co-hosts the 2017 ICC Champions Trophy and hosts 5 matches, including the semi-final between India and Bangladesh. The stadium's record attendance for an ODI was raised three times during the Champions Trophy, with the semi-final attracting a crowd of 24,340, which was the highest attendance for any match in the tournament, including the final.
- 2017 – Edgbaston hosted the first day/night Test match in England, between England and West Indies, starting on 17 August. It would also mark the debut for the pink Dukes ball. England beat the West Indies by an innings and 209 runs within 3 days with Alastair Cook and Joe Root both scoring centuries. Stuart Broad became the second-leading wicket-taker in Test matches for England. The West Indies lost 19 wickets on day 3 of the match, the first time they lost 19 wickets in a single day of a Test match. It was also the 50th Test match to be held at Edgbaston.
- 2018 – Jos Buttler hits the fastest Twenty20 International half-century by an England batsman to propel the home side to a 28-run win over Australia at Edgbaston. England score 221–5, their second-highest ever T20I score.
- 2018 – Hosted England's 1,000th Test match during India tour of England. England won the match by 32 runs.
- 2019 – Hosted 4 group matches and one semi-final in the 2019 ICC Cricket World Cup. All matches were sold out months in advance as England advanced to the final by beating Australia by 8 wickets in the semi-final.
- 2019 – Edgbaston hosts the first Test match in the 2019 Ashes where Australia beat England by 251 runs with Steven Smith getting 144 in the first and 142 in the second innings. Smith helped Australia recover from 122 for 8 in the first innings and became the second batsman to score a century in both innings of a Test match at Edgbaston. It was also the first time Australia had won at Edgbaston since 2001.
- 2021 - Warwickshire win the Country Championship for the 8th time on the final day of the season after beating Somerset by 118 runs at Edgbaston.
- 2022 - England beat India by 7 wickets in the fifth and final Test match of the delayed 2021 Indian tour of England to draw the series 2-2. England broke their record for the highest total in a 4th innings to win a Test match on the fifth day by scoring 378 for 3 at Edgbaston.
- 2022 - Edgbaston hosts the women's T20 event at the Birmingham Commonwealth Games. All group, semi-final and final matches were played at Edgbaston. Australia won the first gold medal in the event by beating India in the final and New Zealand the bronze by beating England.
- 2022 - Will Smeed becomes the first man to score a century in the Hundred competition scoring 101 off 49 balls for Birmingham Phoenix against Southern Brave at Edgbaston.
- 2023 - Australia beat England in the first Ashes Test match by 2 wickets after a 55 run 9th wicket stand in the second innings on the fifth day.
- 2023 - Australia beat England by 4 wickets in the second match of the women's Ashes and the first T20 of the series. The match set an attendance record of 19,527 for a women's match outside the World Cup and was first with an all women grounds staff to prepare the pitch and outfield.
- 2024 - England beat West Indies by 10 wickets and win the Test series, in a match where England captain Ben Stokes scored England's quickest 50 in a Test match. Stokes scored the 50 off 25 balls whilst opening in the second innings.

== Test cricket records ==
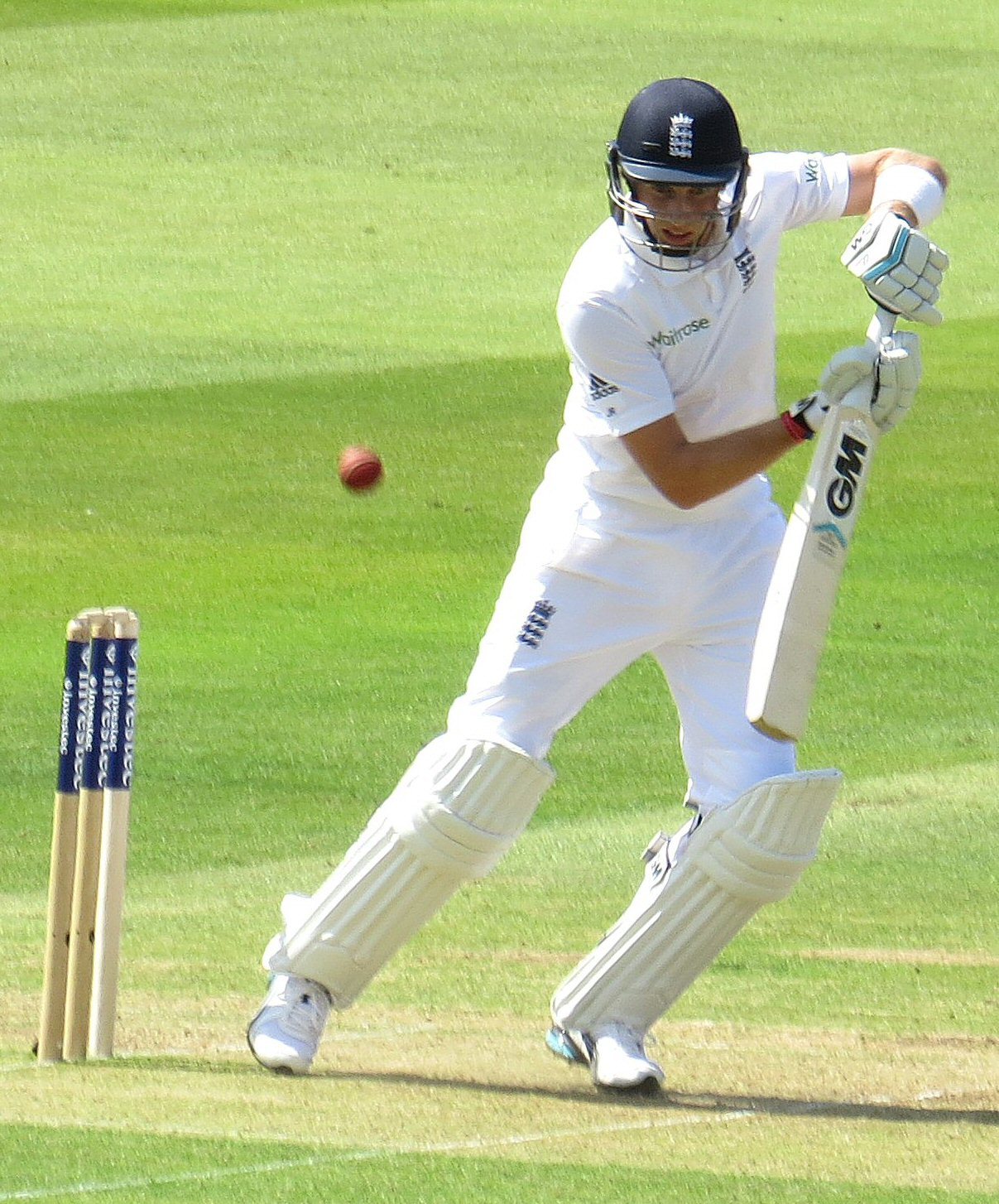
Joe Root holds the record for most career runs at Edgbaston.

=== Batting ===
Most career runs
Runs	Player	Period
948 (18 innings)	(England) Joe Root	2015–2025
869 (16 innings)	(England) Alastair Cook	2006–2018
767 (14 innings)	(England) David Gower	1978–1989
737 (13 innings)	(England) Colin Cowdrey	1957–1971
670 (11 innings)	(England) Marcus Trescothick	2001–2006

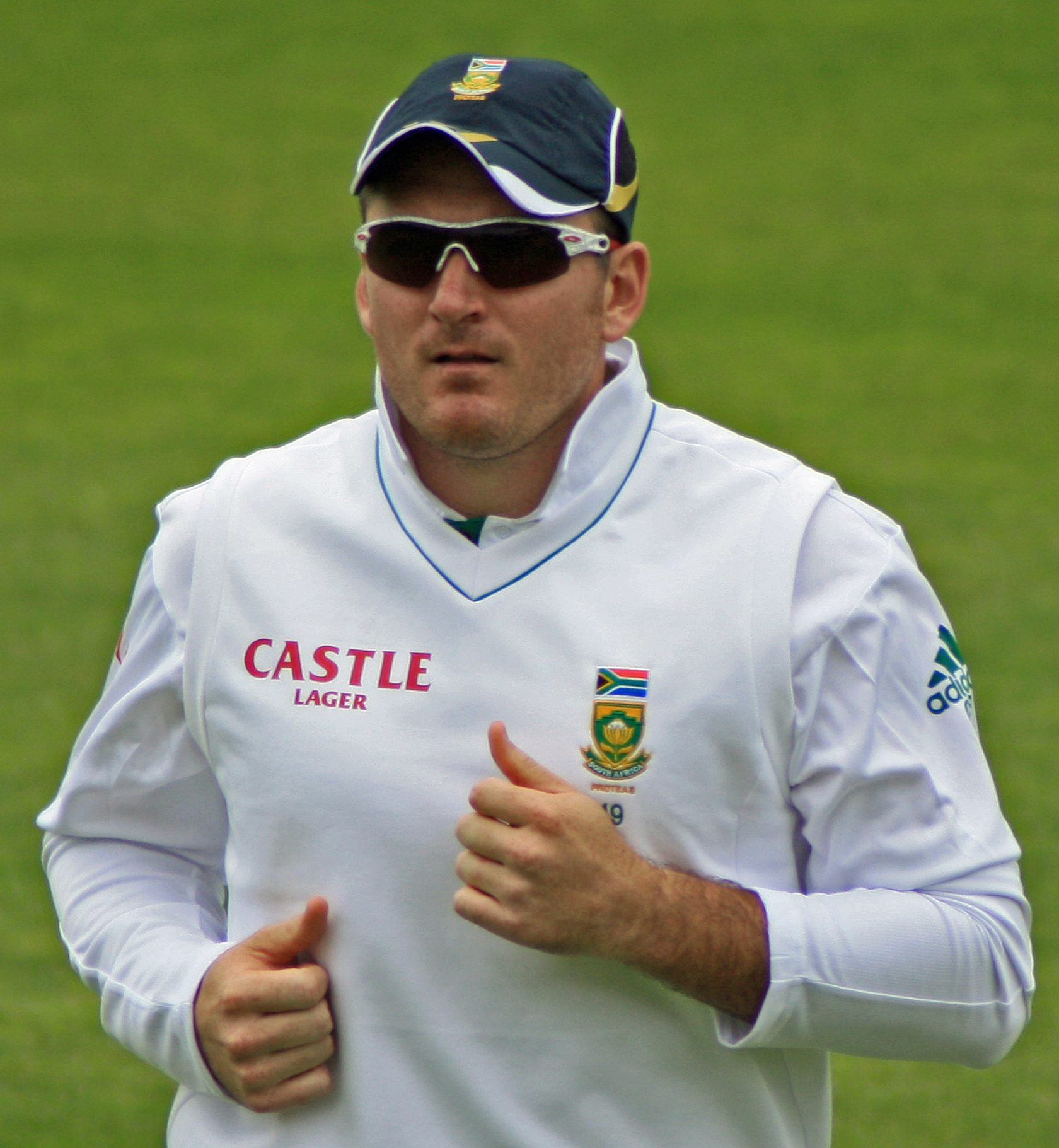
Graeme Smith holds the record for most career runs at the ground by a non-Englishman.

Most career runs (non-England)
Runs	Player	Period
523 (4 innings)	(South Africa) Graeme Smith	2003–2008
451 (4 innings)	(India) Shubman Gill	2022–2025
326 (7 innings)	(Pakistan) Javed Miandad	1978–1992
323 (6 innings)	(Australia) Steve Smith	2015–2023
318 (3 innings)	(Pakistan) Zaheer Abbas	1971–1982

Highest individual scores
Runs	Player	Date
294 v. India	(England) Alastair Cook	10 Aug 2011
285* v. West Indies	(England) Peter May	30 May 1957
277 v. England	(South Africa) Graeme Smith	24 Jul 2003
274 v. England	(Pakistan) Zaheer Abbas	3 Jun 1971
269 v. England	(India) Shubman Gill	2 Jul 2025

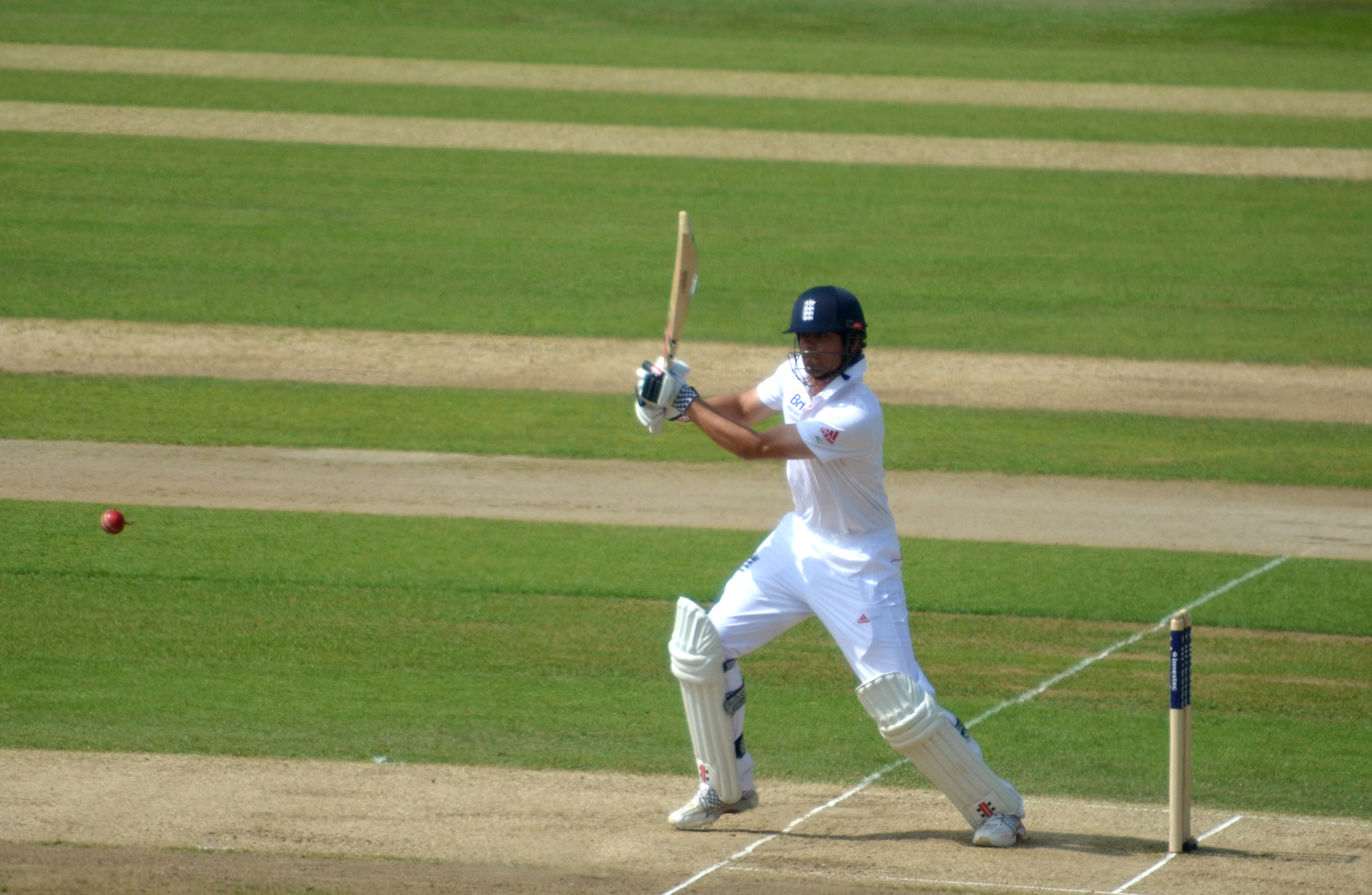
Alastair Cook scored 294 against India in 2011, the record score at the ground.

Most centuries
Centuries	Player	Period
3 (9 innings)	(England) Mike Gatting	1981–1987
3 (11 innings)	(England) Marcus Trescothick	2001–2006
3 (13 innings)	(England) Colin Cowdrey	1957–1971
3 (18 innings)	(England) Joe Root	2015–2025

Note: eight players have also scored two centuries at the ground.

Highest batting average (3+ matches)
Average	Player	Period
74.71 (9 innings, 2 NO)	(England) Mike Gatting	1981–1987
68.00 (5 innings, 2 NO)	(England) Keith Fletcher	1973–1975
67.00 (11 innings, 1 NO)	(England) Marcus Trescothick	2001–2006
63.50 (5 innings, 1 NO)	(Australia) Mark Waugh	1993–2001
63.20 (18 innings, 3 NO)	(England) Joe Root	2015–2025

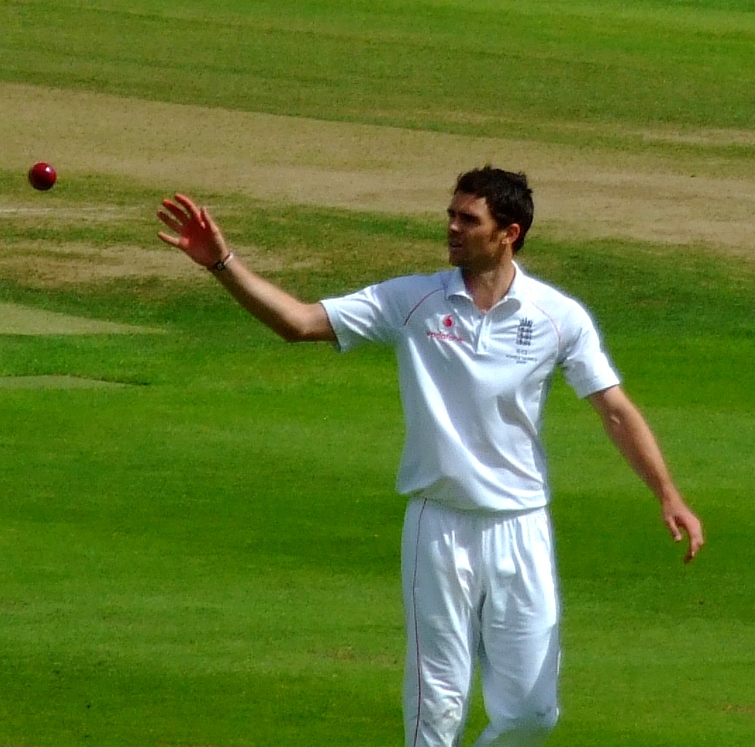
James Anderson has taken the most wickets at the ground, with 52.

=== Bowling ===
Most career wickets
Wickets	Player	Period
52 (27 innings)	(England) James Anderson	2003–2023
49 (22 innings)	(England) Stuart Broad	2009–2023
39 (13 innings)	(England) Fred Trueman	1957–1965
29 (15 innings)	(England) Ian Botham	1978–1992
25 (8 innings)	(Australia) Shane Warne	1993–2005

Most career wickets (non-England)
Wickets	Player	Period
25 (8 innings)	(Australia) Shane Warne	1993–2005
20 (6 innings)	(Australia) Nathan Lyon	2015–2023
19 (6 innings)	(Cricket West Indies) Courtney Walsh	1991–2000
17 (6 innings)	(Pakistan) Imran Khan	1971–1987
15 (3 innings)	(Sri Lanka) Muttiah Muralitharan	2002–2006

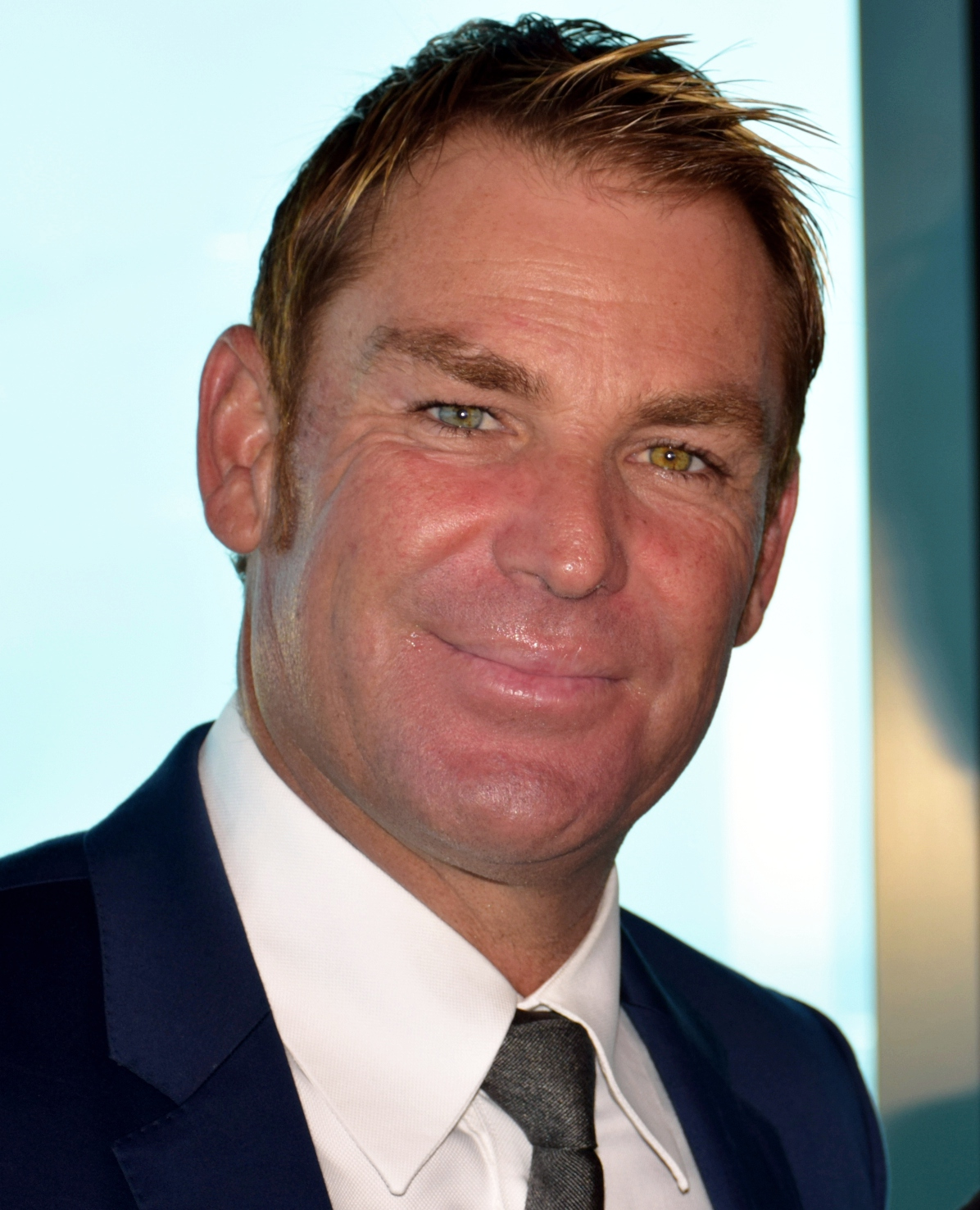
Shane Warne took 25 wickets at the ground, the most by a non-Englishman.

Best innings figures
Figures	Player	Date
7/17 v. Australia	(England) Wilfred Rhodes	29 May 1902
7/44 v. West Indies	(England) Fred Trueman	4 Jul 1963
7/49 v. England	(Cricket West Indies) Sonny Ramadhin	30 May 1957
7/50 v. Pakistan	(England) Chris Old	1 Jun 1978
7/52 v. England	(Pakistan) Imran Khan	29 Jul 1982

Best match figures
Figures	Player	Date
12/119 v. West Indies	(England) Fred Trueman	4 Jul 1963
11/90 v. South Africa	(England) Arthur Gilligan	14 Jun 1924
11/102 v. Australia	(England) Colin Blythe	27 May 1909
10/104 v. Australia	(England) Richard Ellison	15 Aug 1985
10/115 v. England	(Sri Lanka) Muttiah Muralitharan	25 May 2006
10/162 v. England	(Australia) Shane Warne	4 Aug 2005
10/187 v. England	(India) Akash Deep	2 Jul 2025
10/188 v. England	(India) Chetan Sharma	3 Jul 1986

Lowest strike rate (4+ innings)
Strike rate	Player	Period
22.8 (5 wickets)	(England) Mark Butcher	1997–2003
31.6 (19 wickets)	(Cricket West Indies) Courtney Walsh	1991–2000
31.6 (11 wickets)	(India) Mohammed Siraj	2022–2025
33.4 (12 wickets)	(England) George Hirst	1902–1909
34.0 (13 wickets)	(England) Mike Hendrick	1974–1979

=== Team records ===
Highest innings scores
Score	Team	Date
710/7d	England v. India	10 Aug 2011
633/5d	England v. India	12 Jul 1979
608/7d	Pakistan v. England	3 Jun 1971
606	West Indies v. England	14 Jun 1984
595/5d	England v. Australia	15 Aug 1985

Lowest completed innings
Score	Team	Date
30	South Africa v. England	14 Jun 1924
36	Australia v. England	29 May 1902
72	Pakistan v. England	6 Aug 2010
74	Australia v. England	27 May 1909
89	England v. West Indies	6 Jul 1995

=== Partnership records ===
Highest partnerships
Runs	Wicket	Players	Match	Date
411	4th	Peter May (285*) & Colin Cowdrey (154)	England v. West Indies	30 May 1957
338	1st	Graeme Smith (277) & Herschelle Gibbs (179)	South Africa v. England	24 Jul 2003
331	2nd	David Gower (215) & Tim Robinson (148)	England v. Australia	15 Aug 1985
322	4th	Saleem Malik (165) & Javed Miandad (153*)	Pakistan v. England	4 Jun 1992
303	6th	Jamie Smith (184*) & Harry Brook (158)	England v. India	2 Jul 2025

Highest partnerships by wicket
Runs	Wicket	Players	Match	Date
338	1st	Graeme Smith (277) & Herschelle Gibbs (179)	South Africa v. England	24 Jul 2003
331	2nd	David Gower (215) & Tim Robinson (148)	England v. Australia	15 Aug 1985
248	3rd	Alastair Cook (243) & Joe Root (136)	England v. West Indies	17 Aug 2017
411	4th	Peter May (285*) & Colin Cowdrey (154)	England v. West Indies	30 May 1957
185	5th	Michael Clarke (103*) & Marcus North (96)	Australia v. England	30 Jul 2009
303	6th	Jamie Smith (184*) & Harry Brook (158)	England v. India	2 Jul 2025
159	7th	Alan Knott (116) & Peter Lever (47)	England v. Pakistan	3 Jun 1971
115	8th	Zulqarnain Haider (88) & Saeed Ajmal (50)	Pakistan v. England	6 Aug 2010
150	9th	Eldine Baptiste (87*) & Michael Holding (69)	West Indies v. England	14 Jun 1984
143	10th	Denesh Ramdin (107*) & Tino Best (95)	West Indies v. England	7 Jun 2012

Last updated 25 October 2025.

== Limited overs international cricket records ==
Highest Innings team score

- ODI: England 408 for 9 v. New Zealand, 9 June 2015
- T20I: England 221 for 5 v. Australia, 27 June 2018

Lowest innings team score

- ODI (50 overs): Australia 70 all out v. England, 4 June 1977

Highest individual score

- ODI (60 overs): Glenn Turner 171* for New Zealand v. East Africa, 7 June 1975
- ODI (55 overs): Robin Smith 167* for England v. Australia, 21 May 1993
- ODI (50 overs): Andrew Strauss 154 for England v. Bangladesh, 12 July 2010
- T20I: Aaron Finch 84 for Australia v. England, 27 June 2018

Best bowling figures

- ODI: Shahid Afridi 5 for 11 for Pakistan v. Kenya, 14 September 2004
- T20I: Chris Jordan 4 for 27 for England v. India, 9 July 2022

Highest partnerships

- ODI: 256* Jason Roy and Alex Hales for England v. Sri Lanka, 24 June 2016
- T20I: 95 Jos Buttler and Jason Roy for England v. Australia, 27 June 2018

Leading run-scorers

- In ODIs: Rohit Sharma – 447 runs

Leading wicket-takers

- In ODIs: Darren Gough – 21 wickets

== See also ==
- List of cricket grounds in England and Wales
- List of Test cricket grounds

== Bibliography ==
- "2011 Edgbaston" (PDF). Keith Prowse. 2011. Archived from the original (PDF) on 3 October 2011.
- Bannister, Jack (1990). The history of Warwickshire County Cricket Club. London: Christopher Helm. ISBN 0-7470-0217-7.
- Hignell, Andrew (2002). Rain stops play: cricketing climates. London: Routledge. ISBN 0-7146-5173-7.
- Powell, William (1992). The Wisden Guide to Cricket Grounds. London: Stanley Paul. ISBN 0-09-177188-9.
- Pringle, Derek (7 August 1994). "Arena: Pioneers with grand ambition: 16 Edgbaston: Derek Pringle traces the history of a county and Test cricket ground which is laced with controversy". The Independent. London. Archived from the original on 10 November 2012.
- Ryder, Rowland (1973). "The Warwickshire way – What is it that makes Warwickshire tick?". In Preston, Norman (ed.). Wisden Cricketers' Almanack. London: Sporting Handbooks. ISBN 0-85020-028-8.
