= Order of precedence in Scotland =

Relative preeminence of officials for ceremonial purposes

The order of precedence in Scotland was fixed by Royal Warrant in 1905. Amendments were made by further Warrants in 1912, 1952, 1958, 1999 (to coincide with the establishment of the Scottish Parliament and Scottish Government) and most recently in 2012.

The relative precedence of peers of Scotland is determined by the Act of Union 1707.

== Gentlemen ==
=== Royalty, high officials, et al. ===
==== Royal family ====
Precedence is accorded to spouses, children and grandchildren of the reigning sovereign, as well as children and grandchildren of former sovereigns.

Position	Holder	Ref
The sovereign (regardless of sex)	Charles III	
Lord High Commissioner to the General Assembly of the Church of Scotland (Note: Only while the Assembly is meeting, during which they are treated as a regent and addressed as 'Your Grace')	office held by a woman (Lady Elish Angiolini)	
Sons of the sovereign	Prince William, Duke of Rothesay	
Sons of the sovereign	Prince Harry, Duke of Sussex	
Grandsons of the sovereign	Prince George of Wales	(Note: "From [1726] onwards it has been the settled practice to place the male members of the Royal Family in the following order: the Sovereign's son, grandsons, brothers, uncles and nephews")
Grandsons of the sovereign	Prince Louis of Wales	(Note: "From [1726] onwards it has been the settled practice to place the male members of the Royal Family in the following order: the Sovereign's son, grandsons, brothers, uncles and nephews")
Grandsons of the sovereign	Prince Archie of Sussex	(Note: "From [1726] onwards it has been the settled practice to place the male members of the Royal Family in the following order: the Sovereign's son, grandsons, brothers, uncles and nephews")
Brothers of the sovereign	Andrew Mountbatten-Windsor	
Brothers of the sovereign	Prince Edward, Duke of Edinburgh	
Uncles of the sovereign	none at present	
Nephews of the sovereign	James, Earl of Wessex	
Nephews of the sovereign	Peter Phillips	
Grandsons of former sovereigns who are dukes	Prince Richard, Duke of Gloucester	(Note: "in the outcome [in 1850] The Duke of Cambridge was not only placed in Garter's Roll above all the other dukes, but also above the Archbishop of Canterbury and the Lord Chancellor, despite his not falling within the ambit of s. 4 of the Act of 1539. This precedent has been followed in all subsequent similar cases.")
Grandsons of former sovereigns who are dukes	Prince Edward, Duke of Kent	(Note: "in the outcome [in 1850] The Duke of Cambridge was not only placed in Garter's Roll above all the other dukes, but also above the Archbishop of Canterbury and the Lord Chancellor, despite his not falling within the ambit of s. 4 of the Act of 1539. This precedent has been followed in all subsequent similar cases.")
Grandsons of former sovereigns who are not dukes	David Armstrong-Jones, 2nd Earl of Snowdon	
Grandsons of former sovereigns who are not dukes	Prince Michael of Kent	

==== High Officers of State, et al. ====
Title	Holder	Ref
Lord-Lieutenants	see list below	
Sheriffs Principal	see list here	
Lord Chancellor	Alex Norris	
Moderator of the General Assembly of the Church of Scotland	Gordon Kennedy	
Prime Minister	Andy Burnham	
Keeper of the Great Seal of Scotland (First Minister)	John Swinney	
Presiding Officer	Kenneth Gibson	
Secretary of State	Douglas Alexander	
Lord High Constable	Merlin Hay, 24th Earl of Erroll	
Master of the Household	Torquhil Campbell, 13th Duke of Argyll	

=== Nobility, et al. ===
==== Dukes, et al. ====
	Note	Ref
England	Ordered according to date of creation	
Scotland	Ordered according to date of creation	
(Kingdom of Great Britain) Great Britain	Ordered according to date of creation	
Ireland	Maurice FitzGerald, 9th Duke of Leinster	
United Kingdom of Great Britain and Ireland	Ordered according to date of creation	
Eldest sons of royal dukes who are not already ranked higher	Alexander Windsor, Earl of Ulster (son of the Duke of Gloucester); George Windsor, Earl of St Andrews (son of the Duke of Kent)	

==== Marquesses, et al. ====
	Note	Ref
England	Marquess of Winchester	
Scotland	Ordered according to date of creation	
(Kingdom of Great Britain) Great Britain	Ordered according to date of creation	
Ireland	Ordered according to date of creation	
United Kingdom of Great Britain and Ireland	Ordered according to date of creation	
Eldest sons of dukes according to the precedence of the peerage holders

==== Earls, et al. ====
	Note	Ref
England	Ordered according to date of creation	
Scotland	Ordered according to the Decreet of Ranking of 1606 according to date of creation	
(Kingdom of Great Britain) Great Britain	Ordered according to date of creation	
Ireland	Ordered according to date of creation	
United Kingdom of Great Britain and Ireland	Ordered according to date of creation	
Younger sons of royal dukes who are not already ranked higher	Lord Nicholas Windsor (second son of the Duke of Kent)	
Eldest sons of marquesses according to the precedence of the peerage holders
Younger sons of dukes according to the precedence of the peerage holders

==== Judiciary, et al. ====
1. Lord Justice General (Paul Cullen, Lord Pentland)
2. Lord Clerk Register (office held by a woman)
3. Lord Advocate (office held by a woman)
4. Advocate General for Scotland (office held by a woman)
5. Lord Justice Clerk (John Beckett, Lord Beckett)
1. Viscounts
2. Eldest sons of earls
3. Lord Frederick Windsor (only son of Prince Michael of Kent)
4. Younger sons of marquesses

==== Viscounts, et al. ====
	Note	Ref
England	Robin Devereux, 19th Viscount Hereford	
Scotland	Ordered according to date of creation	
(Kingdom of Great Britain) Great Britain	Ordered according to date of creation	
Ireland	Ordered according to date of creation	
United Kingdom of Great Britain and Ireland	Ordered according to date of creation	
Eldest sons of earls according to the precedence of the peerage holders
Younger sons of marquesses ordered according to the precedence of the peerage holders

==== Barons, et al. ====
1. Barons and Lords of Parliament
2. Eldest sons of viscounts
3. Younger sons of earls
4. Eldest sons of barons

=== Knights and below ===
1. Knights Companion of the Order of the Garter
2. Knights of the Order of the Thistle
3. Privy Counsellors
4. Senators of the College of Justice and the Chairman of the Scottish Land Court
5. Younger sons of viscounts
6. Younger sons of barons
7. Sons of law life peers
8. Baronets
9. ~~Knights of the Order of St Patrick~~
10. Knights Grand Cross/Commander
  1. Order of the Bath
  2. ~~Order of the Star of India~~
  3. Order of St Michael and St George
  4. ~~Order of the Indian Empire~~
  5. Royal Victorian Order
  6. Order of the British Empire
11. Knights Commander of such orders
12. Solicitor General for Scotland (Ruth Charteris – see Order of Precedence for Ladies below)
13. Lord Lyon King of Arms (The Revd Canon Joseph Morrow)
14. Sheriffs-Principal
15. Knights Bachelor
16. Sheriffs as amended by
17. Companions
  1. Order of the Bath
  2. ~~Order of the Star of India~~
  3. Order of St Michael and St George
  4. ~~Order of the Indian Empire~~
18. Commanders
  1. Royal Victorian Order
  2. Order of the British Empire
19. Lieutenants of the Royal Victorian Order
20. Companions of the Distinguished Service Order
21. Officers of the Order of the British Empire
22. Companions of the Imperial Service Order
23. Eldest sons of younger sons of peers
24. Eldest sons of baronets
25. Eldest sons of knights, ordered by their father
26. Members of the Royal Victorian Order
27. Members of the Order of the British Empire
28. Younger sons of baronets
29. Younger sons of knights, ordered by their father
30. King's Counsel as amended by
31. Esquires
32. Gentlemen

== Ladies ==
=== Royal Family ===
The order of precedence accorded to women of the royal family:

Position	Holder
Consort of the sovereign	Queen Camilla
Queens Dowager	none at present
Daughters-in-law of the sovereign	Catherine, Duchess of Rothesay
Daughters-in-law of the sovereign	Meghan, Duchess of Sussex
Daughters of the sovereign	none at present
Wives of grandsons of the sovereign	none at present
Granddaughters of the sovereign	Princess Charlotte of Wales
Granddaughters of the sovereign	Princess Lilibet of Sussex
Sisters-in-law of the sovereign	Sophie, Duchess of Edinburgh
Sisters of the sovereign	Anne, Princess Royal
Wives of uncles of the sovereign	none at present
Aunts of the sovereign	none at present
Wives of nephews of the sovereign	Harriet Phillips
Nieces of the sovereign	Princess Beatrice, Mrs Edoardo Mapelli Mozzi
Nieces of the sovereign	Princess Eugenie, Mrs Jack Brooksbank
Nieces of the sovereign	Lady Louise Mountbatten-Windsor
Nieces of the sovereign	Zara Tindall
Wives of grandsons of former sovereigns who are dukes	Birgitte, Duchess of Gloucester
Wives of grandsons of former sovereigns who are not dukes	Serena Armstrong-Jones, Countess of Snowdon
Wives of grandsons of former sovereigns who are not dukes	Princess Michael of Kent
Granddaughters of former sovereigns	Lady Sarah Chatto
Granddaughters of former sovereigns	Princess Alexandra, The Honourable Lady Ogilvy

=== High Officers or their wives ===
1. Lord-Lieutenants (see list below)
2. Sheriffs-Principal (during term of office and with bounds of Sheriffdom)
3. Commonwealth Prime Ministers, while visiting the UK, in order of appointment
4. Ambassadors of foreign countries and High Commissioners of Commonwealth countries according to date of arrival

=== Peers ===
1. Duchesses
  1. Claire Booth, Countess of Ulster
  2. Sylvana Tomaselli, Countess of St Andrews, wife of Earl of St Andrews
  3. Lady Davina Windsor, elder daughter of the Duke of Gloucester
  4. Lady Rose Gilman, younger daughter of the Duke of Gloucester
  5. Lady Helen Taylor, only daughter of the Duke of Kent
2. Marchionesses
3. Wives of dukes' eldest sons
4. Daughters of dukes not married to peers
5. Countesses
  1. Lady Nicholas Windsor, wife of Lord Nicholas Windsor
6. Wives of marquesses' eldest sons
  1. Lady Gabriella Kingston, only daughter of Prince Michael of Kent
7. Marquesses' daughters not married to peers
8. Wives of dukes' younger sons
9. Viscountesses
10. Wives of earls' eldest sons
  1. Sophie Winkleman, wife of Lord Frederick Windsor
11. Wives of marquesses' younger sons
12. Earls' daughters not married to peers
13. Baronesses, wives of Lords and Ladies of Parliament
14. Wives of viscounts' eldest sons
15. Viscounts' daughters not married to peers
16. Wives of earls' younger sons
17. Wives of barons' eldest sons
18. Barons' Daughters

=== Ladies of orders ===
1. Ladies Companion of the Order of the Garter
  1. Lady Mary Fagan
  2. Lady Mary Peters
2. Ladies of the Order of the Thistle (all rank higher)
  Lady Elish Angiolini
3. Wives of Knights Companion of the Order of the Garter (all rank higher, except)
  1. June, Lady Hillary
  2. Jennifer, Lady Acland
  3. Dame Norma, Lady Major
  4. Cherie, Lady Blair
4. Wives of Knights of the Order of the Thistle (all rank higher, except)
  1. Lady (Helen) Wood
  2. Lady (Daphne) Reid
  3. Lady (Margaret) Palmer
  4. Lady (Eileen) McDonald
  5. Lady (Lynne) MacMillan
5. Wives of Knights of the Order of St Patrick (none, order dormant)
6. Privy Counsellors
7. Senators of the College of Justice
8. Wives of viscounts' younger sons
9. Wives of barons' younger sons
10. Baronetesses
11. Dames Grand Cross
  1. Order of the Bath
  2. Order of St Michael and St George
  3. Royal Victorian Order
  4. Order of the British Empire
12. Wives of Knights Grand Crosses of such orders
13. Dames Commander of such orders
14. Solicitor General for Scotland (Ruth Charteris)
15. Wives of Knights Commander of such orders
16. Companions of such orders
17. Wives of Companions of such orders
18. Companions of the Distinguished Service Order
19. Wives of Companions of the Distinguished Service Order
20. Lieutenantes of the Royal Victorian Order
21. Officers of the Order of the British Empire
22. Wives of Lieutenants of the Royal Victorian Order
23. Wives of Officers of the Order of the British Empire
24. Senatrices of the College of Justice
25. Wives of College of Justice Senators
26. Wives of Knights Bachelor
27. Companions of the Imperial Service Order
28. Wives of Companions of the Imperial Service Order
29. Wives of the eldest sons of sons of peers
30. Daughters of sons of peers
31. Wives of the eldest sons of baronets
32. Daughters of baronets
33. Wives of eldest sons of knights/dames
34. Daughters of knights/dames
35. Members
  1. Royal Victorian Order
  2. Order of the British Empire
36. Wives of Members of such orders
37. Wives of younger sons of baronets
38. Wives of younger sons of knights/dames
39. King's Counsel as amended by
40. Gentlewomen

== Local precedence ==
1. Lord-Lieutenants of the lieutenancy areas (the Lord Provost is Lord Lieutenant in the four largest cities):
  - Lord Provost of Aberdeen (Dr David Cameron)
  - Lord Lieutenant of Aberdeenshire (Sandy Manson)
  - Lord Lieutenant of Angus (Patricia Ann Sawers)
  - Lord Lieutenant of Argyll and Bute (Jane Margaret MacLeod)
  - Lord Lieutenant of Ayrshire and Arran (Iona McDonald)
  - Lord Lieutenant of Banffshire (Andrew Simpson)
  - Lord Lieutenant of Berwickshire (Jeanna Swan)
  - Lord Lieutenant of Caithness (John Thurso, 3rd Viscount Thurso)
  - Lord Lieutenant of Clackmannanshire (Johnny Stewart)
  - Lord Lieutenant of Dumfries (Fiona Armstrong)
  - Lord Lieutenant of Dunbartonshire (Jill Williamina Young)
  - Lord Provost of Dundee (Bill Campbell)
  - Lord Lieutenant of East Lothian (Roderick Urquhart)
  - Lord Provost of Edinburgh (Robert Aldridge)
  - Lord Lieutenant of Fife (Robert William Balfour)
  - Lord Provost of Glasgow (Jacqueline McLaren)
  - Lord Lieutenant of Inverness (James Wotherspoon)
  - Lord Lieutenant of Kincardineshire (Alastair Macphie)
  - Lord Lieutenant of Lanarkshire (Susan Haughey, Baroness Haughey)
  - Lord Lieutenant of Midlothian (Sarah Barron)
  - Lord Lieutenant of Moray (Air Commodore Alistair Monkman)
  - Lord Lieutenant of Nairn (George Russell Asher)
  - Lord Lieutenant of Orkney (Elaine Grieve)
  - Lord Lieutenant of Perth and Kinross (Stephen Leckie)
  - Lord Lieutenant of Renfrewshire (Colonel Peter McCarthy)
  - Lord Lieutenant of Ross and Cromarty (Joanie Whiteford)
  - Lord Lieutenant of Roxburgh, Ettrick and Lauderdale (Richard Scott, 10th Duke of Buccleuch)
  - Lord Lieutenant of Shetland (Lindsay Tulloch)
  - Lord Lieutenant of Stirling and Falkirk (Colonel Charles Wallace)
  - Lord Lieutenant of Sutherland (Major-General Patrick Marriott)
  - Lord Lieutenant of The Stewartry of Kirkcudbright (Lord Sinclair)
  - Lord Lieutenant of Tweeddale (Catherine Maxwell Stuart, 21st Lady of Traquair)
  - Lord Lieutenant of the Western Isles (Iain Macaulay)
  - Lord Lieutenant of West Lothian (Moria Niven)
  - Lord Lieutenant of Wigtown (Aileen Brewis)
2. The Provost
3. The Deputy Provost
4. Justices of the peace
5. The Chief constable

== Notes ==
16. The scales annexed to the royal warrant of 1905, unfortunately, are not exhaustive of all rights of precedence, and appear to have been drawn up without a proper consideration of the Scots law of precedence. Where a person has been omitted from the scales, but has an undoubted precedence by the law of Scotland (such as barons, ambassadors and Irish peers created prior to 1801), the Lord Lyon, in seeing that the warrant is observed and kept, has a duty to give that person an appropriate place in the order of precedence on the appropriate occasion.
