= Wetherby School =

Boys' school in Notting Hill, London

Coordinates: 51°30′41.2″N 0°11′42.3″W

Wetherby School (Pre-prep)

Location
- Pembridge Square; London, W2 4ED; England

Information
- Type: Private pre-prep day school
- Motto: Care, Share and Be Fair
- Established: 1951
- Local authority: Kensington and Chelsea
- Department for Education URN: 100519 Tables
- Ofsted: Reports
- Head teacher: Mark Snell
- Gender: Male
- Age: 2 to 8
- Colours: Grey, Red
- Website: www.wetherbyschool.co.uk

Wetherby School is a group of private schools for boys aged two to eighteen in Notting Hill, Kensington, and Marylebone, London, owned and operated by the Inspired Education Group. Its prep school is a member of the Independent Association of Preparatory Schools.

The school is named after Wetherby Place, in turn named after a West Yorkshire town, Wetherby, and should not be confused with Wetherby High School, a local secondary school.

It has several notable former pupils, including William, Prince of Wales; Prince Harry, Duke of Sussex; and the actor Hugh Grant.

== History ==
Wetherby School was founded in 1951 as a pre-preparatory school for boys aged 4–8. In 2004 it opened a preparatory department (known as Wetherby Prep, and intended to be a separate school) in a nearby building, allowing boys to stay on until the age of 13. The prep school has since moved to its current location in Marylebone.

The school's original building, in 1951, was in Wetherby Place in South Kensington (hence the name, Wetherby School) but in 1971 it moved to its present building in Pembridge Square, on the other side of Kensington Gardens. The school building is a white stucco double fronted Victorian house in the Italianate style typical of Notting Hill and Holland Park architecture, constructed in about 1850. It is on the south side of Pembridge Square, a private garden square with keyholder-only access which the boys use as their playground.

In 2020 the school was recognized as one of the world's 100 leading schools by The Schools Index.

== Wetherby Preparatory School ==
Wetherby Preparatory School

Location
- Prep:48 Bryanston Square; London, W1H 2EA

Information
- Type: Private day school
- Established: 2004; 2015 (senior school)
- Local authority: City of Westminster
- Department for Education URN: 134822 Tables
- Head teacher: Nina Kingsmill Moore
- Gender: Male
- Age: 7 to 13
- Enrolment: 374
- Website: www.wetherbyprep.co.uk

In 2004, Wetherby expanded to open a prep division for boys aged 7 to 13, sited in Bryanston Square, London. In September 2012, Wetherby Prep was awarded 'Prep School of the Year' at the annual Tatler School Awards at the Dorchester Hotel.

== Wetherby Senior School ==
Wetherby Senior School

Location
- Senior:100 Marylebone Lane; London, W1U 2QB; United Kingdom

Information
- Type: Private day school
- Established: 2004; 2015 (senior school)
- Local authority: City of Westminster
- Department for Education URN: 142336 Tables
- Head teacher: Joe Silvester
- Gender: Male
- Age: 11 to 18
- Enrolment: 400
- Website: www.wetherbysenior.co.uk

Due to popular demand, Wetherby Senior School for boys aged 11 to 18 opened for its first intake in September 2015. It is located at the former premises of DLD College London on Marylebone Lane, a ten-minute walk away from the prep school.

== Wetherby School Kensington ==
Wetherby Kensington School

Location
- 4 Wetherby Gardens; London, SW5 0JN

Information
- Type: Private day school
- Established: 2017
- Local authority: Royal Borough of Kensington and Chelsea
- Department for Education URN: 144516 Tables
- Head teacher: Helen Milnes
- Gender: Male
- Age: 4 to 8
- Enrolment: 150
- Website: www.wetherby-kensington.co.uk

Wetherby School Kensington is the most recent school to join the Wetherby family, with their doors opening in September 2017. Wetherby School Kensington is situated on Wetherby Gardens in Kensington, which is the same street that the original Wetherby School was based back in 1951, and takes boys from Reception – Year 3 (4–8 years old).

== Alumni ==
- Romeo Beckham, son of David and Victoria Beckham
- Sir Lawrence Clarke, 7th Baronet, Olympic athlete and financier
- Julian Fellowes, Baron Fellowes of West Stafford, actor and writer; Conservative peer of the House of Lords (2011–)
- Hugh Grant, actor
- Prince Harry, Duke of Sussex, younger son of Diana, Princess of Wales and Charles III
- Julian Lloyd Webber, cellist
- William, Prince of Wales, elder son of Diana, Princess of Wales and Charles III
- Lord Frederick Windsor, son of Prince and Princess Michael of Kent
- Prince Constantine Alexios of Greece and Denmark
- Damian Hurley, son of actress Elizabeth Hurley
- Archie Campbell, Marquess of Lorne, British aristocrat
- Constantine Louloudis MBE, Olympic medal winner, two-time world champion and four-time Boat Race winner
