= Bonaccorsi =

Bonaccorsi is a surname. Notable people with the surname include:

- Antonino Bonaccorsi, Italian painter
- Arconovaldo Bonaccorsi (1898–1962), Italian Fascist soldier, politician and lawyer
- Costanza Bonaccorsi (born 1994), Italian canoeist
- Lorenza Bonaccorsi (born 1968), Italian politician
- Lucilla Bonaccorsi, Italian fashion designer
- Luisa Beccaria Bonaccorsi, Italian fashion designer
- Silvio Sergio Bonaccorsi Barbato (1959–2009), Italian-Brazilian opera conductor and composer

== See also ==
- Aci Bonaccorsi, comune (municipality) in the Metropolitan City of Catania in the Italian region Sicily
