= Godstowe School =

School in Buckinghamshire, England

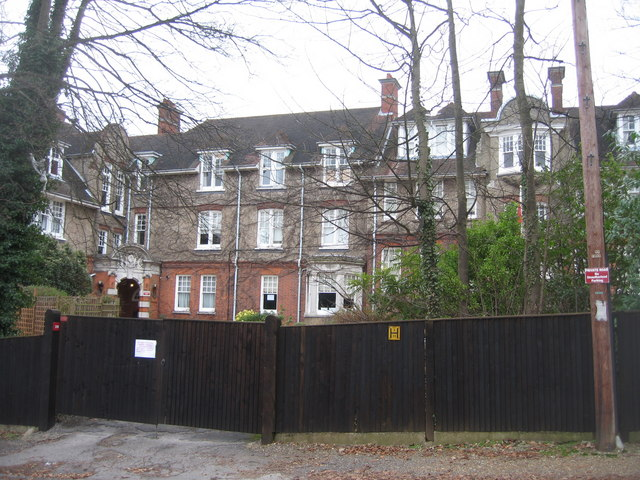
Godstowe School in 2009

Godstowe School is a day and boarding school for girls aged 3 to 13, and boys aged 3 to 7 in High Wycombe in the United Kingdom. The school was founded by Frances Dove in 1900 and was the first all-girls preparatory school in the United Kingdom An 'informal history' of the school was published in 2001 and re-issued in 2017.

== Notable alumni ==
- Lady Gabriella Kingston
- Olivia Dahl
- Elizabeth David
- Zerbanoo Gifford
- Sarah Harding
- Gabriella Teychenné
- Clarissa Ward
