= Love Live Long =

- Directed by: Mike Figgis
- Written by: Mike Figgis
- Produced by: Julie Brangstrup; Maximillion Cooper; Mike Figgis; Patrick Fischer; Steven Malit
- Starring: Daniel Lapaine; Sophie Winkleman
- Cinematography: Mike Figgis
- Music by: Mike Figgis; Arlen Figgis
- Distributed by: Gumball 3000 Films
- Release date: 19 June 2008 (Taormina Film Festival)
- Running time: 75 minutes
- Country: United Kingdom
- Language: English

Love Live Long is a 2008 experimental film centred on the Gumball 3000 rally.
