= Sally Soames =

British newspaper photographer (1937–2019)

- Born: Sally Winkleman; 21 January 1937; London, England
- Died: 5 October 2019 (aged 82); London, England
- Occupation: Photographer
- Spouse: Leonard Soames (m. 1956; div. 1966)
- Children: 1
- Relatives: Claudia Winkleman (niece); Sophie Winkleman (niece)

Sally Soames (née Winkleman; 21 January 1937 – 5 October 2019) was a British newspaper photographer. She worked for The Observer for a period from 1963, and after a spell as a freelance, for The Sunday Times (1968–2000).

== Biography ==
Soames was born in London into a Jewish family, the only daughter of Fay and Leonard Winkleman. She had two brothers, Barry and Allen. Her father was a businessman, art connoisseur and a member of the Communist Party. She was educated at King Alfred School in Golders Green, and St Martin’s College of Art, both in London.

Soames won an Evening Standard photography competition, winning five guineas, for her photograph of a youth in Trafalgar Square on New Year's Eve, 1960. "My first photograph was my best photograph. What I was doing was fearless; in latter years I was more professional, a bit institutionalised", she told Barbara Hodgson in 2010.

Her first regular work as a photographer was for The Observer in 1963. After a period as a freelance, during which time her work also appeared in also appeared in The Guardian, Newsweek and The New York Times, Soames joined the staff of The Sunday Times in 1968, remaining with the newspaper until 2000. She photographed world leaders, including Menachem Begin and several British prime ministers.

She did not restrict herself to portraits of the prominent, which Soames described as being "photographs of people", but worked in war zones as well. Working as a photojournalist, she documented the 1973 Arab–Israeli War with Sunday Times reporter Nicholas Tomalin who wrote in his last dispatch, while bombs around them were exploding, that Soames was "the first Englishwoman photographer to stand bolt upright throughout (an air attack) snapping pictures as if she were covering a golf tournament". Soames suffered Posttraumatic stress disorder after witnessing Tomalin's death during the conflict. Her experience of PTSD did not stop her from returning to the middle east on many occasions and she developed an affection for Israel. Out of personal interest, rather than for professional or financial reasons, she lived in Auschwitz for several days in autumn 1979. In commemoration of Yom HaShoah, the international day of remembrance for the Holocaust, Soames photographs were exhibited at the Jewish Museum on Fifth Avenue and 92nd Street in Manhattan from May to August 1982.

Soames worked exclusively in black and white, almost always using available natural light. She refused to work in colour, which she considered a form of "vulgarity", although newspapers had by then switched to colour printing. Soames had a strong preference for the Nikon FM2 camera and, in the early 1990s, searched London for examples in the belief it was about to be discontinued. Her work was used by numerous television and film companies in the UK and the US. She engaged with her subjects to be able to photograph them as convivially as possible. In 1967, it was possible for her to spend half a day with director Orson Welles, but the encroaching publicity machine meant she was able to spend only three and a half minutes to photograph Sean Connery some years later, but used the first two minutes to talk with Connery. In 2010 Soames nominated as her Best Shot ever the trio showing Rupert Murdoch in 1981 announcing his purchase of Times Newspapers, flanked by his editors Harold Evans and William Rees-Mogg.

== Personal life and death ==
Soames lived in London her whole life. In 1956, she married Leonard Soames, owner of the Snob high street clothing chain, while still a student at St Martins. The couple had a son three years later, but divorced in 1966. Trevor Soames is a barrister and photographer. Physical mobility problems from having to move heavy equipment around brought her career to an end in 2000. Her nieces are Claudia and Sophie Winkleman, respectively a television presenter and actress.

Soames died on 5 October 2019 aged 82, at her home in North London. Her portraits are held in two London collections, the National Portrait Gallery (Edward Heath and Salman Rushdie) and Victoria and Albert Museum (Rudolf Nureyev and Lord Denning). She donated her personal collection of photographs and documents to the Scott Trust Foundation.

== Publications ==
- Manpower. London: André Deutsch, 1987. ISBN 978-0233981116. With text by Robin Morgan and an introduction by Harold Evans.
- Writers. London: André Deutsch, 1995. ISBN 978-0233989457. With a preface by Norman Mailer.

== Collections ==
Soames' work is held in the following permanent public collections:

- National Portrait Gallery, London: 17 prints (as of October 2019)
- Victoria and Albert Museum, London: 2 prints (as of October 2019)
