= Dr. Freud Will See You Now, Mrs. Hitler =

Dr Freud Will See You Now, Mrs Hitler is an alternate history play written by the British comedy writing duo Laurence Marks and Maurice Gran. The play is an "alternate history" dramatisation based on reports that Adolf Hitler, then aged 6, was referred to Sigmund Freud for therapy at the latter's pædiatric psychotherapy clinic in Vienna, but did not go to meet him; the point of divergence is that this meeting went ahead. It began as a 2007 BBC radio drama and received its world stage premiere at Upstairs at the Gatehouse in London in September 2025.

== Radio broadcast ==
The play was broadcast on 31 March 2007 in cut-down form by the BBC on Radio 4 as part of The Saturday Play. The hour-long production, directed by Peter Kavanagh, starred Toby Jones, Allan Corduner, Sophie Winkleman, Christine Kavanagh, John Dougall, Sam Dale, Jasmine Callan, Mark Straker, and Anthony Glennon. A reading in aid of the Freud Museum Foundation was performed on 13 May 2007 at the Tricycle Theatre, and was followed by a panel discussion with the writers together with the Chair of the Freud Museum's Board, Lisa Appignanesi, and an expert on Freud, Prof. John Forrester (historian).

== Stage adaptation ==
The play received its world stage premiere at Upstairs at the Gatehouse in Highgate, London, running from 4 to 28 September 2025. The production was covered by BBC Radio 4's Front Row. The production was directed by Isaac Bernier-Doyle and produced by Annlouise Butt for Chromolume, the venue's in-house producing company.

The cast comprised Jonathan Tafler as Sigmund Freud, Sam Mac as Adolf Hitler, Nesba Crenshaw as Martha Freud and Klara Hitler, Ruby Ablett as Anna Freud, Brendan Lyle as Otto Rank, and Neil Chinneck as Carl Jung. The stage version expanded the story considerably beyond the original radio play, following the imagined relationship between Freud and Hitler across three decades, from Hitler's childhood in Vienna to his rise as Führer.

=== Reception ===
The production received largely positive reviews. Morning Star awarded it five stars, praising Hannah Danson's set and Simon Jackson's lighting design and calling the production "a result of many years of research and commitment". The Guardian's Mark Lawson awarded the production four stars, calling it a "richly imagined play" that "fizzes with intelligence".

The Spectator praised Jonathan Tafler's performance as Freud and Isaac Bernier-Doyle's direction, while noting that the play's second half was less comic than its first and that its characterisation favoured Freud over Hitler. Jewish Renaissance and the Ham & High each awarded the production four stars.
