= Luisa Beccaria =

Italian fashion designer

- Occupation: Fashion designer
- Spouse: Prince Lucio Bonaccorsi di Reburdone
- Children: 5 (including Lucilla Bonaccorsi)
- Website: luisabeccaria.com

Donna Luisa Beccaria Bonaccorsi di Reburdone (née Beccaria) is an Italian fashion designer.

== Career ==
Frederica Torti wearing a Luisa Beccaria design in 2015

Beccaria began her fashion line in 1983. She opened her first showroom in Milan with Fiori Chiari and then opened her first shop in Brera, Milan. She is known for her designs using floral prints, brocade textures, and pastel colors. She is also known for her bridal collections. In 2006, she began co-designing with one of her daughters, Lucilla Bonaccorsi.

Beccaria's 2019 couture fall line was shown at the Hôtel de Gesvres.

Her Spring 2027 ready-to-wear line debuted at the Civic Aquarium of Milan in September 2026.

Beccaria's designs have been worn by Queen Rania of Jordan, Queen Camilla of the United Kingdom, Lady Gabriella Kingston, Madonna, Helena Bonham Carter, Angelina Jolie, Jennifer Lopez, Melania Trump, Kate Winslet, Halle Berry, Eva Green, and Nicole Kidman.

== Personal life ==
Beccaria married Sicilian nobleman Prince Lucio Bonaccorsi de Reburdone, with whom she has five children. They live at Feudo del Castelluccio, an 18th-century villa.
