= Lady Gabriella Kingston =

British freelance writer (born 1981)

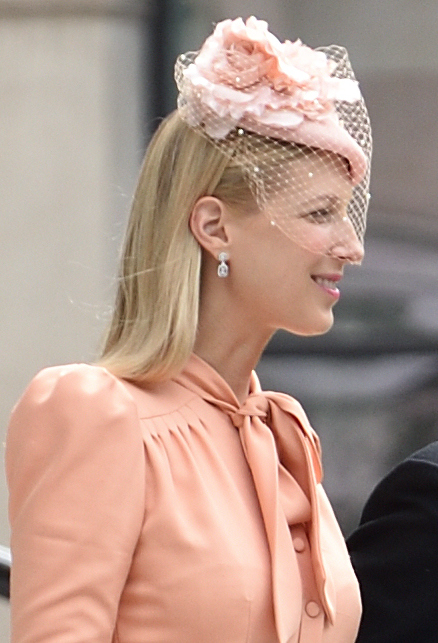
- Kingston in 2022
- Born: Lady Gabriella Marina Alexandra Ophelia Windsor; 23 April 1981 (age 45); St Mary's Hospital, London, England
- Other name: Ella Windsor
- Education: Brown University (BA, 2004); Linacre College, Oxford (MPhil, 2012)
- Occupations: Writer and contributing editor
- Spouse: Thomas Kingston (m. 2019; died 2024)
- Parents: Prince Michael of Kent (father); Baroness Marie-Christine von Reibnitz (mother)
- Relatives: House of Windsor

Lady Gabriella Marina Alexandra Ophelia Kingston (née Windsor; born 23 April 1981) is a British writer and editor. She is a member of the British royal family as the only daughter of Prince and Princess Michael of Kent. At her birth she was 18th in the line of succession to the British throne; as of August 2026, she is 58th. As a great-grandchild of King George V and Queen Mary, she is a second cousin of King Charles III.

== Early life and education ==
Lady Gabriella Marina Alexandra Ophelia Windsor was born on 23 April 1981 at St Mary's Hospital, London, the second child and only daughter of Prince and Princess Michael of Kent. She has an elder brother, Frederick. Gabriella was baptised on 8 June at the Chapel Royal, St James's Palace, London. Her godparents were Constantine II of Greece; Mariano Hugo, Prince of Windisch-Graetz; Marina Ogilvy; Princess Antonia, Marchioness of Douro; and Lady Elizabeth Shakerley. She was educated at Godstowe School and Downe House School in Cold Ash, Berkshire. In May 2004, Gabriella graduated from Brown University in Providence, Rhode Island, with a BA degree in Comparative Literature and Hispanic studies. In 2012, she earned an MPhil degree in Social Anthropology from Linacre College, Oxford. She is 58th in the line of succession to the British throne.

== Career ==
Gabriella works as a writer and contributing editor, and contributes to The London Magazine among other publications. She is a board director of the Playing for Change Foundation, a global music and arts education nonprofit. After living in Latin America, she worked with several companies in the region, teaching English in Rio de Janeiro and producing music events in Buenos Aires. Gabriella undertook a research project with El Colegio del Cuerpo in Colombia and later worked for the brand company Branding Latin America as an arts and travel director.

In 2020, as a singer-songwriter, she released two songs, "Out of Blue" and "Bam Bam", to raise money for a charity. She has also sung "Put the Sea", "Half" and "This Morning".

In 2024, she helped Catherine, Princess of Wales, plan the annual Together at Christmas carol service at Westminster Abbey.

== Personal life ==
For three years in the early 2000s, she dated journalist Aatish Taseer. The two met when she was an undergraduate at Brown University and he was a graduate of Amherst College working for Time magazine. In 2018, he wrote a controversial article about their relationship and the royal family for Vanity Fair.

Gabriella's engagement to Thomas Henry Robin Kingston (22 June 1978 – 25 February 2024), a Dean Close School alumnus and University of Bristol graduate, was announced by Buckingham Palace on 19 September 2018. He was part of the diplomatic missions unit of the Foreign Office and, between 2003 and 2006, was stationed in Baghdad, where he served as a project manager for the International Centre for Reconciliation. After returning to Britain, he pursued a career in finance, holding positions including equity analyst for Schroders, managing director of Voltan Capital Management, and director of Devonport Capital. The couple became engaged on the Isle of Sark in August 2018. Their wedding took place at St George's Chapel, Windsor Castle, on 18 May 2019, and was attended by Queen Elizabeth II and Prince Philip, Duke of Edinburgh. The bride wore a Luisa Beccaria design.

Her husband died by suicide on 25 February 2024, aged 45, from a self-inflicted gunshot wound to the head, while under the adverse effects of antidepressants.

== Ancestry ==
Ancestors of Lady Gabriella Kingston

8. George V of the United Kingdom
4. Prince George, Duke of Kent
9. Princess Victoria Mary of Teck
2. Prince Michael of Kent
10. Prince Nicholas of Greece and Denmark
5. Princess Marina of Greece and Denmark
11. Grand Duchess Elena Vladimirovna of Russia
1. Lady Gabriella Kingston
12. Hans von Reibnitz
6. Günther von Reibnitz
13. Ida von Eickstedt
3. Baroness Marie-Christine von Reibnitz
14. Count Frigyes Szapáry de Muraszombath, Széchysziget et Szapár
7. Countess Maria Anna Szapáry von Muraszombath, Széchysziget et Szapár
15. Countess Maria zu Windisch-Graetz

Lines of succession
Preceded by Isabella Windsor	Line of succession to the British throne granddaughter of George, Duke of Kent great-granddaughter of George V	Succeeded by Princess Alexandra
