= Lord Frederick Windsor =

British financial analyst (born 1979)

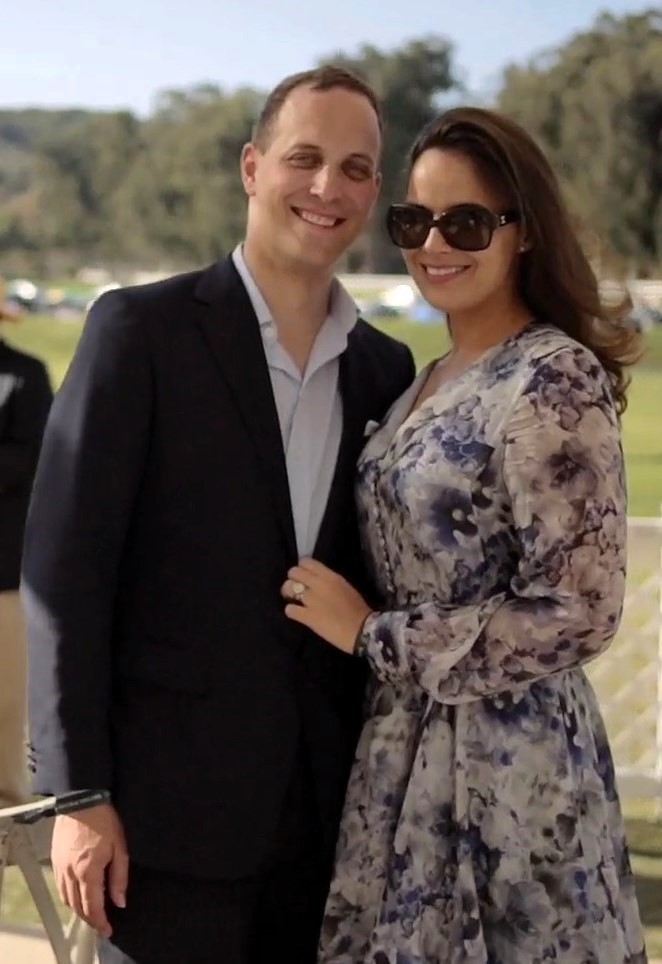
- Frederick and his wife, Sophie Winkleman, in 2014
- Born: Lord Frederick Michael George David Louis Windsor; 6 April 1979 (age 47); St Mary's Hospital, London, England
- Education: Magdalen College, Oxford
- Occupation: Investment banker
- Spouse: Sophie Winkleman (m. 2009)
- Children: 2
- Parents: Prince Michael of Kent (father); Baroness Marie-Christine von Reibnitz (mother)
- Family: House of Windsor

Lord Frederick Michael George David Louis Windsor (born 6 April 1979) is a relative of the British royal family. He is the only son of Prince and Princess Michael of Kent, and is 55th in the line of succession to the British throne. He is married to British actress Sophie Winkleman and is a financial analyst by profession. As a great-grandchild of King George V and Queen Mary, he is a second cousin of King Charles III.

== Early life and education ==
Lord Frederick Michael George David Louis Windsor was born on 6 April 1979 at St Mary's Hospital, London, and was christened on 11 July at the Chapel Royal, St James's Palace, Westminster. A first cousin once removed of Queen Elizabeth II and a first cousin twice removed of Prince Philip, Duke of Edinburgh, he is therefore both a second cousin and a second cousin once removed of King Charles III and his siblings. He was 54th in the line of succession to the British throne in 2025 (before the birth of Adelaide Brooksbank higher in line).

Frederick and his sister, Lady Gabriella, were brought up in the Church of England.

He was educated at Wetherby School, Sunningdale, and Eton College, where he was an Oppidan Scholar, then at Magdalen College, Oxford, where he gained a 2:1 degree in Classics.

== Career ==
After graduating, Frederick worked as a fashion model, appearing in a campaign for Burberry and for the designer Tomasz Starzewski, and also as a music journalist, notably for Tatler magazine. He initially planned to qualify as a solicitor specialising in entertainment law, but by September 2006, according to The Times, he was working as an analyst in the wealth management arm of JP Morgan in London. He is now a banker and executive director at JPMorgan Chase, and is a CFA charterholder, having received his charter in 2013.

== Personal life ==
On St Valentine's Day, 14 February 2009, Frederick became engaged to the actress Sophie Winkleman. The Queen consented to the marriage, as required by the Royal Marriages Act 1772, and the couple were married at Hampton Court on 12 September 2009.

Their first child, Maud Elizabeth Daphne Marina, was born on 15 August 2013 at Ronald Reagan UCLA Medical Center in Los Angeles. She was baptised at St James's Palace in December 2013 and has Princess Eugenie among her godparents. Maud served as a bridesmaid at the wedding of Princess Eugenie and Jack Brooksbank in 2018.

Their second daughter, Isabella Alexandra May, was born on 16 January 2016 at Chelsea and Westminster Hospital in London. She was baptised at Kensington Palace in June 2016, with Jamie Oliver, a close friend of her mother, serving as one of the godparents.

On 21 February 2017, Frederick was inducted into the Grand Order of Water Rats charitable fraternity.

== Titles and styles ==
Under letters patent issued in 1917 and still in force today, Frederick's father is entitled to the dignity of prince and the style His Royal Highness as the son of a son of George V. Although these letters do not bestow these royal dignities beyond grandchildren of monarchs (except in the case of the children of the Prince of Wales, as modified by Elizabeth II), they allow the children of sons of sons of a British monarch to be styled as the children of a duke, with the honorific courtesy style of Lord or Lady before their given names. Since neither Lord Frederick nor his father are peers in their own right, Lord Frederick's style is not hereditary and his children are not entitled to any distinctions, including the prefix The Honourable. They do, however, follow him in the line of succession to the British throne.

== Honours ==
- 6 February 2002: Queen Elizabeth II Golden Jubilee Medal
- 6 February 2012: Queen Elizabeth II Diamond Jubilee Medal
- 6 February 2022: Queen Elizabeth II Platinum Jubilee Medal
- 6 May 2023: King Charles III Coronation Medal

Lord Frederick Windsor Born: 6 April 1979
Lines of succession
Preceded by Prince Michael of Kent	Line of succession to the British throne grandson of George, Duke of Kent great-grandson of George V	Succeeded by Maud Windsor
