= Prince Michael of Kent =

British prince (born 1942)

Prince Michael
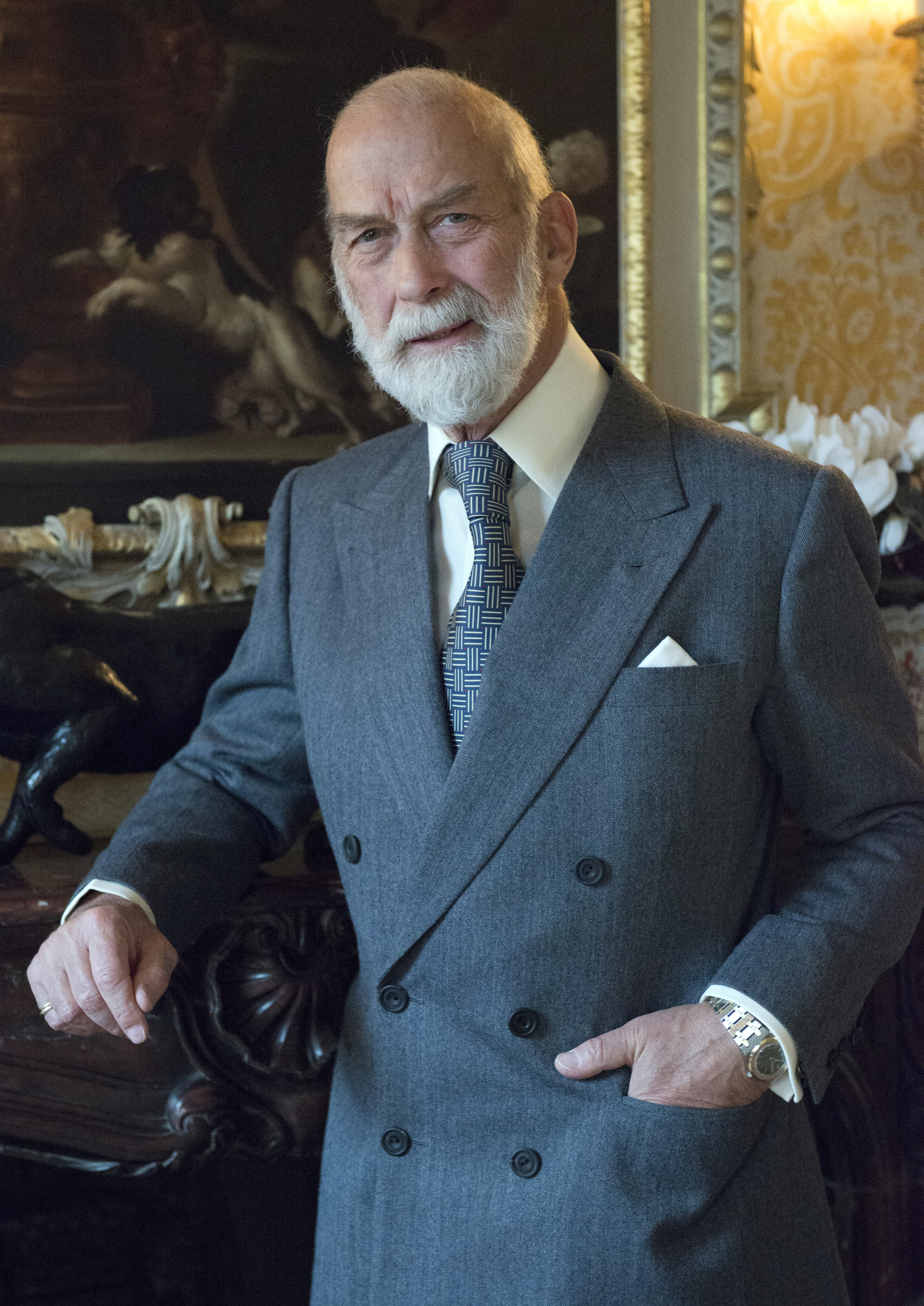
- Portrait by Allan Warren, 2014
- Born: 4 July 1942 (age 84); Coppins, Iver, Buckinghamshire, England
- Spouse: Marie-Christine von Reibnitz (m. 1978)
- Issue: Lord Frederick Windsor; Lady Gabriella Kingston
Names
- Michael George Charles Franklin (Note: British princes such as Michael do not normally use a surname, but when one is needed, Windsor may be used.)
- House: Windsor
- Father: Prince George, Duke of Kent
- Mother: Princess Marina of Greece and Denmark
- Military career
- Branch: British Army
- Years of active service: 1961–1981
- Rank: Major (active service)
- Unit: 11th Hussars (Prince Albert's Own) The Royal Hussars (Prince of Wales's Own)
- Conflicts: Cyprus dispute

Prince Michael of Kent (Michael George Charles Franklin; born 4 July 1942) is a member of the British royal family who is 54th in line to the British throne as of 2026. The younger son of Prince George, Duke of Kent, and Princess Marina of Greece and Denmark, he is a grandson of George V, nephew of Edward VIII and George VI, and first cousin of Elizabeth II. Michael's mother was also a first cousin of Prince Philip, Duke of Edinburgh, consort of Elizabeth II, making Michael both a second cousin and first cousin once removed to Charles III.

Michael occasionally represented Elizabeth II at some functions in Commonwealth realms outside the United Kingdom during her reign. Otherwise, he manages his own consultancy business and undertakes various commercial work around the world. He has also presented some television documentaries on the royal families of Europe.

== Early life ==
Michael was born at 7:35 pm on 4 July 1942 at Coppins, Iver, Buckinghamshire. He was the third child of Prince George, Duke of Kent, who was the fourth son of King George V and Queen Mary and a younger brother of kings Edward VIII and George VI. At birth, Michael was seventh in line to the British throne. His mother was Princess Marina, a daughter of Prince Nicholas of Greece and Denmark and Grand Duchess Elena Vladimirovna of Russia.

At Michael's baptism on 4 August in the Private Chapel of Windsor Castle, his godparents were his paternal uncle the King; Queen Wilhelmina of the Netherlands (for whom her son-in-law Prince Bernhard stood proxy); King Haakon VII of Norway (his great-uncle); US President Franklin D. Roosevelt (for whom the Duke of Kent stood proxy); Frederica of Hanover, Hereditary Princess of Greece (his first cousin once removed, who was absent); Prince Henry, Duke of Gloucester (his paternal uncle, who was absent); the Dowager Marchioness of Milford Haven (his paternal first cousin twice removed); and Lady Patricia Ramsay (his paternal first cousin twice removed). Because of the war, newspaper reports did not identify the location of the baptism and said instead that it took place at "a private chapel in the country".

Seven weeks after Michael's birth, his father was killed in a plane crash near Dunbeath, Caithness, Scotland, on 25 August 1942.

At the age of five, Michael was a page boy at the wedding of his cousins Princess Elizabeth and Lieutenant Philip Mountbatten.

== Education and military service ==
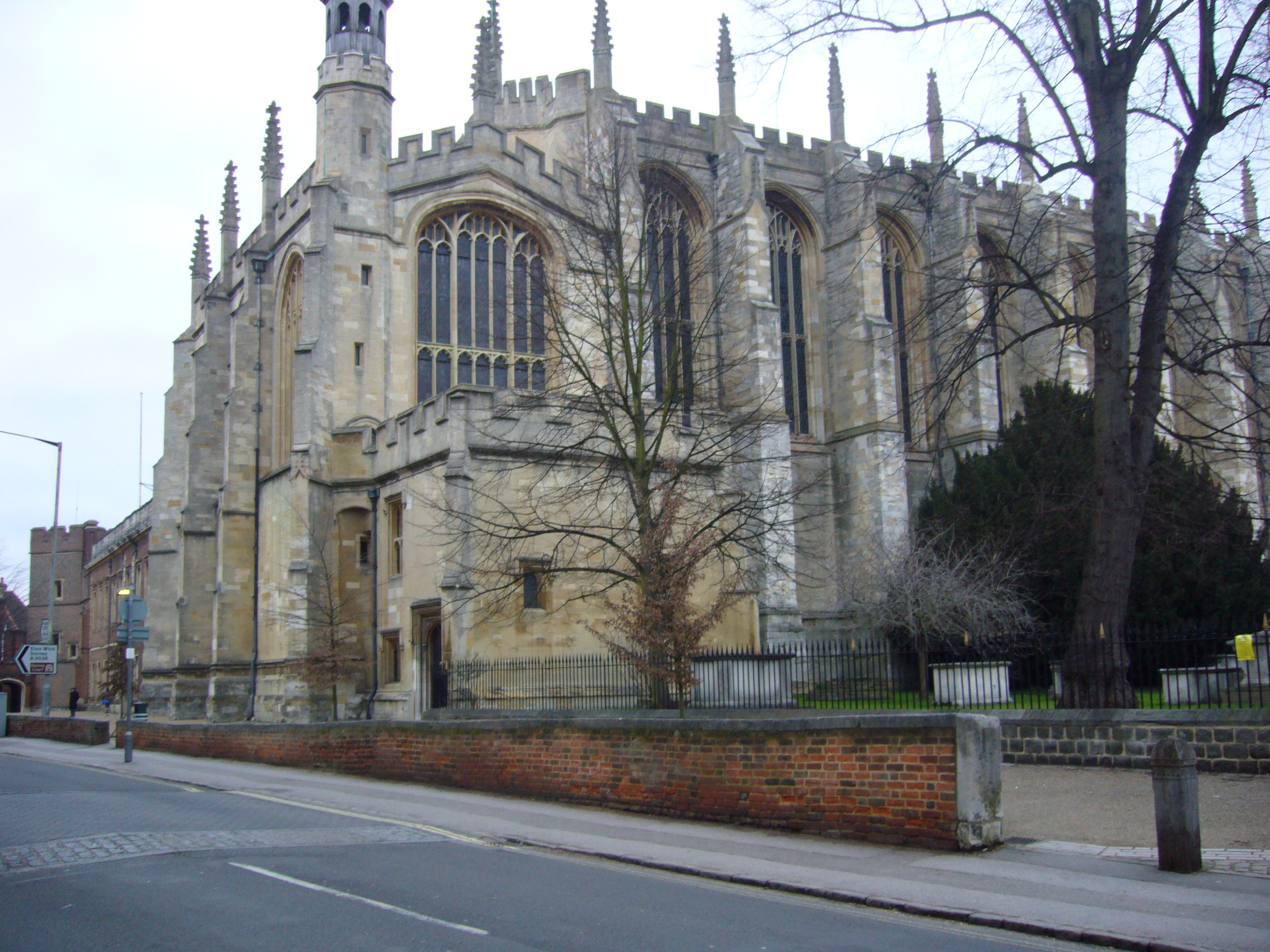
Eton College

Michael was educated at Sunningdale School and Eton College and is fluent in French as well as having a "working knowledge" of German and Italian. He is the first member of the royal family to learn Russian, of which he is a qualified interpreter.

Michael was commissioned into the 11th Hussars (Prince Albert's Own) in 1963. He later served in The Royal Hussars (Prince of Wales's Own) after the amalgamation between the 11th Hussars and the 10th Royal Hussars (Prince of Wales's Own) in 1969. He saw service in Germany, Hong Kong, and Cyprus, where his squadron formed part of a United Nations peacekeeping force in 1971. Subsequent tours of duty, during a military career that spanned twenty years, included a number of appointments on the Defence Intelligence Staff. He retired from the Army with the rank of Major in 1981.

In 1994, Michael was made Honorary Commodore (later Honorary Rear Admiral and then Vice Admiral) of the Royal Naval Reserve, and in 2002, he was made Honorary Air Commodore of RAF Benson (promoted to Honorary Air Marshal in 2012). From 2009 to 2012, he was Regimental Colonel of the Honourable Artillery Company and on 31 January 2012 became its Royal Honorary Colonel. He is also Colonel-in-Chief of the Essex and Kent Scottish Regiment in Canada.

== Activities and patronages ==
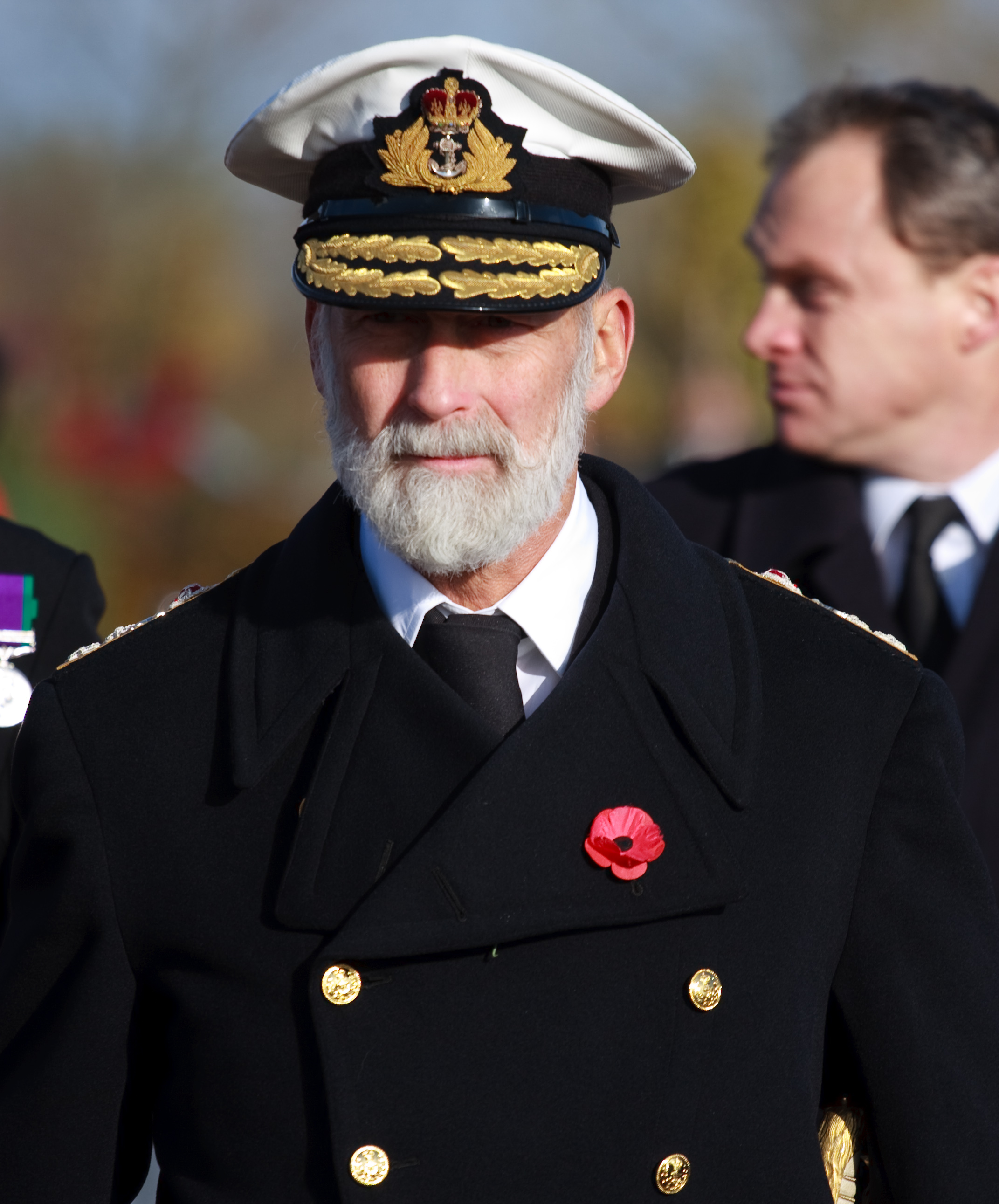
Michael in 2008

As the third child of George V's fourth son, it was not expected that Michael, as the only second son in the extended royal family, would undertake many engagements on behalf of the royal family. He has performed official duties in the Commonwealth realms other than the United Kingdom and has represented the Queen abroad.

He has, however, never received a parliamentary annuity or an allowance from the British Privy Purse, unlike both his elder brother, Prince Edward, Duke of Kent, and his sister, Princess Alexandra, who both carry out official royal duties. He was given the use of a grace and favour apartment at Kensington Palace upon his marriage in 1978. He and his wife also resided at Nether Lypiatt Manor.

Michael represented the Queen at state funerals in India, Cyprus and Swaziland and, with his wife, Princess Michael of Kent, represented the Queen at the independence celebrations in Belize, and at the coronation of King Mswati III of Swaziland.

Michael supports a large number of charities and organisations. Some of his patronages and presidencies include: the Kennel Club, Children's Burns Trust, Maritime Volunteer Service, the Association of Dunkirk Little Ships, Life Saving Society, Royal Automobile Club, National Eye Research Centre, Motor Sports Association, Brooklands Museum Trust, the Light Aircraft Association, and the London School of Business and Finance.

The Prince Michael Road Safety Award was created in 1987 to give public recognition to those improving road safety throughout Great Britain and later the world in general. Michael also set up the Prince Michael of Kent Foundation in 2004 to support projects in Russia, including heritage and cultural restoration.

He announced his retirement from public life in June 2022 as he approached his 80th birthday.

== Marriage and personal life ==
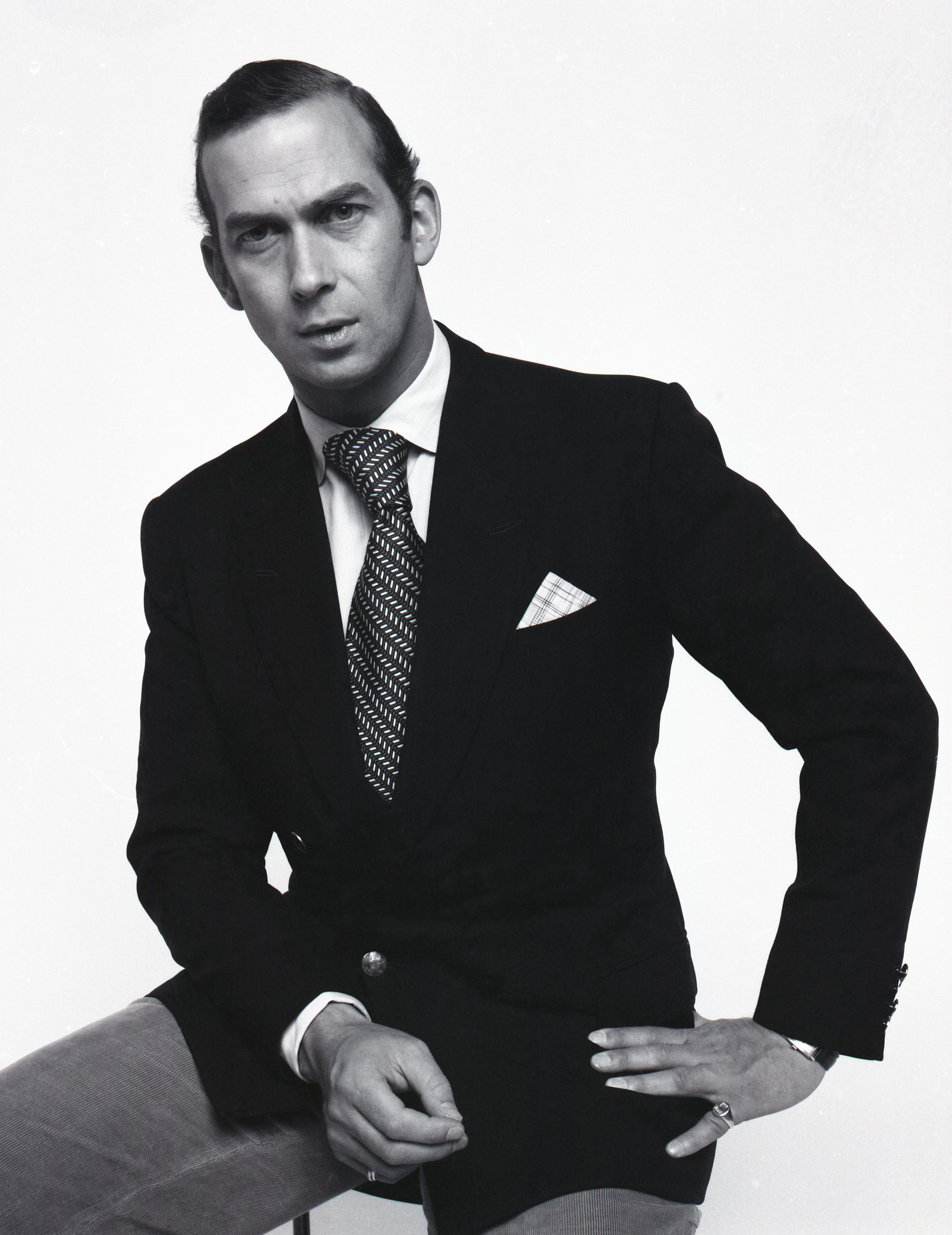
Prince Michael, photographed by Allan Warren

On 30 June 1978, Michael married Baroness Marie-Christine von Reibnitz in a civil ceremony at the City Hall (Wiener Rathaus) in Vienna, Austria. As a Roman Catholic divorcée, previously married to banker Thomas Troubridge, with a Church annulment granted in May 1978, Marie-Christine required papal dispensation for a Catholic ceremony. Pope Paul VI had initially refused, but Pope John Paul II later granted permission. The couple received a Catholic blessing of their marriage and renewed their vows on 29 June 1983 at Archbishop's House, London. Marie-Christine has named Lord Mountbatten as their matchmaker.

Under the terms of the Act of Settlement 1701, Michael forfeited his place in the line of succession to the throne through his marriage to a Catholic. He was reinstated on 26 March 2015 with the coming into force of the Succession to the Crown Act 2013, and is 54th in line to the throne as of January 2025.

Michael and Marie-Christine have two children, both brought up as members of the Church of England and therefore in the line of succession to the throne since birth:

- Lord Frederick Windsor, born 6 April 1979 at St Mary's Hospital, London; married, 12 September 2009, Sophie Winkleman. Educated at Eton College and Magdalen College, Oxford. They have two daughters, Maud and Isabella.
- Lady Gabriella Kingston, born 23 April 1981 at St Mary's Hospital, London; married, 18 May 2019, Thomas Kingston. Educated at Downe House, Brown University in the US, and Linacre College, Oxford. Her husband committed suicide from a self-inflicted gunshot wound on 25 February 2024 in the Cotswolds, Gloucestershire, leaving her widowed at 42 years old.

In 2014, Michael was successfully treated for prostate cancer.

== Personal interests ==
=== Commercial ===
Michael manages his own consultancy business, and undertakes business throughout the world. He is also a qualified interpreter of Russian.

=== Masonic ===
Michael is an active Freemason. He is the Grand Master of the Grand Lodge of Mark Master Masons, and Provincial Grand Master of the Provincial Grand Lodge of Middlesex.

=== Russia ===
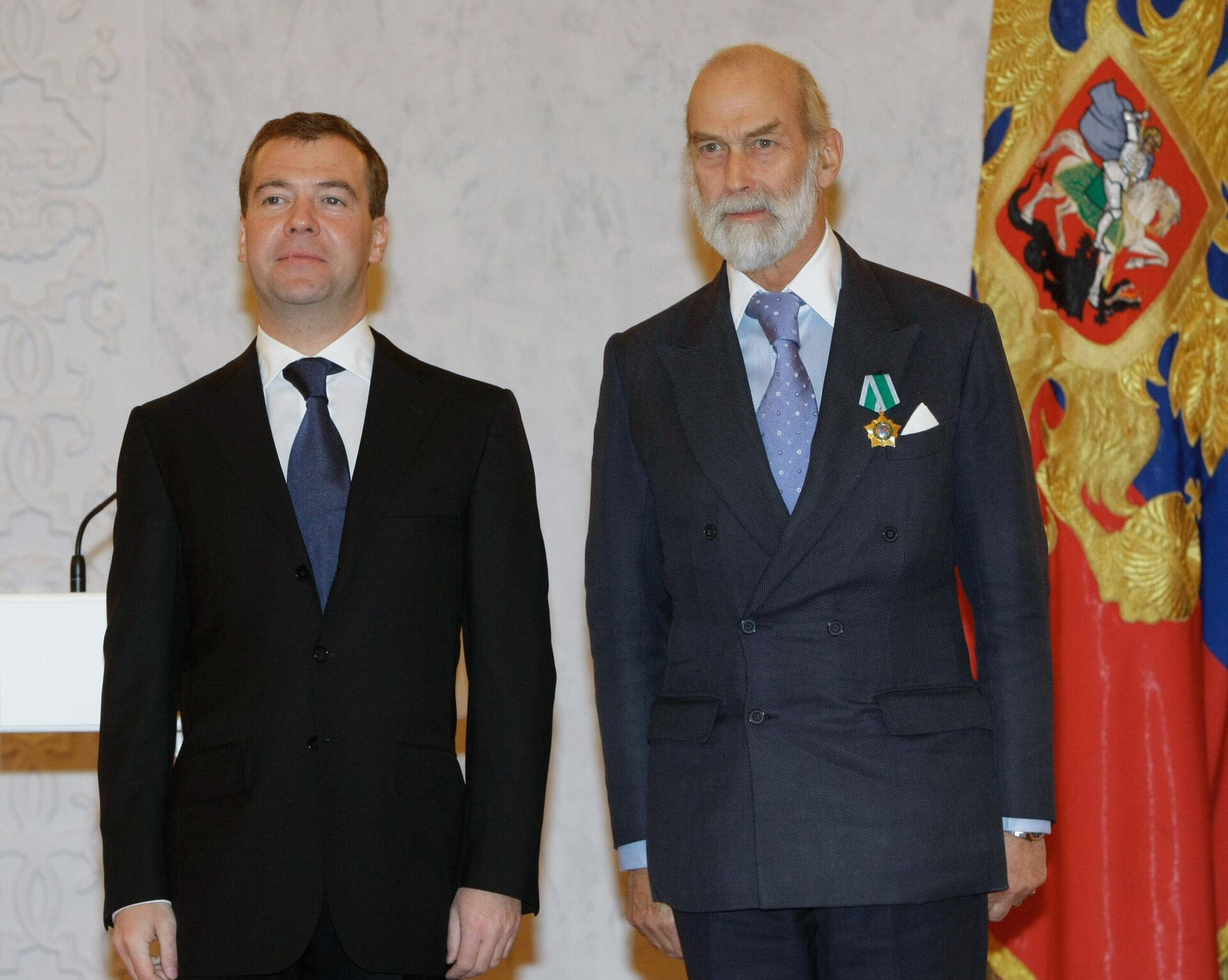
Prince Michael of Kent after his investiture by President Dmitry Medvedev with the Order of Friendship at the Kremlin in 2009. Michael returned the order in 2022.

Michael speaks fluent Russian and has a strong interest in Russia, where he is a well-known figure (he is a former recipient of the Order of Friendship). Tsar Nicholas II was a first cousin of three of his grandparents: George V, Prince Nicholas of Greece and Denmark, and Grand Duchess Elena Vladimirovna of Russia. When the bodies of the Tsar and some of his family were recovered in 1991, the remains were later identified by DNA using, among others, a sample from Michael for recognition. He attended the 1998 burial of the Tsar and his family in St Petersburg. He is an honorary member of the Romanov Family Association. He is also the second cousin of Maria Vladimirovna, Grand Duchess of Russia, who is a claimant to the headship of the Imperial Family of Russia. They share the same great-grandfather, Grand Duke Vladimir Alexandrovich. Michael is the patron of organisations which have close ties with Russia, including the Russo-British Chamber of Commerce and the St Gregory's Foundation. In his capacity as patron of Children's Fire and Burns Trust, Michael has led fundraising rallies in 1999 and 2003 in Russia to raise money for the charity. He also led another rally in 2005 and raised money for the Royal Marsden Hospital and Britain's Charities Aid Foundation Russia.

Michael served as the Patron of the Russo-British Chamber of Commerce (RBCC). He left the position in 2022.

On 4 March 2022, Michael returned the Order of Friendship due to the Russian invasion of Ukraine.

=== Finland ===
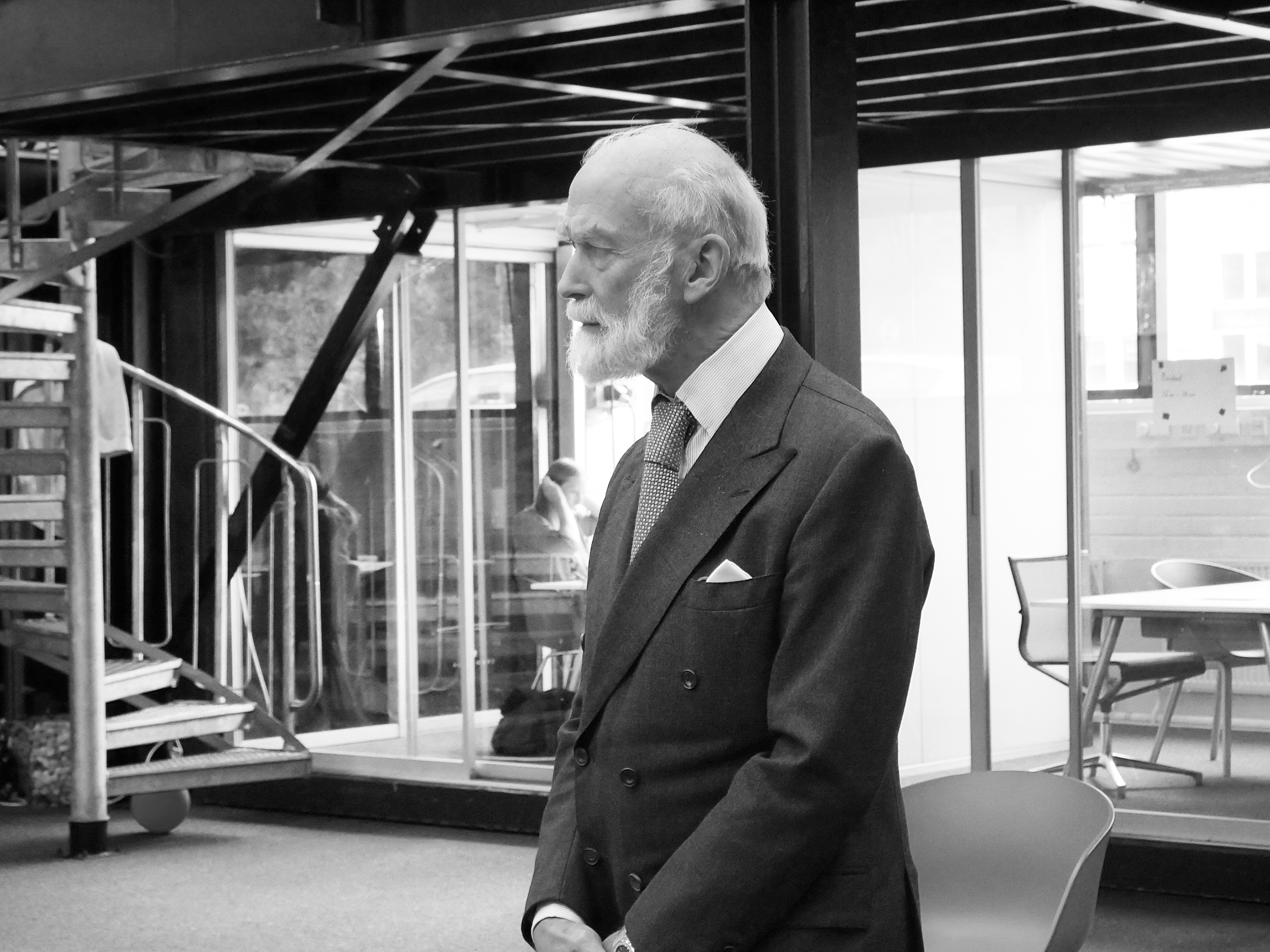
Prince Michael at Aalto University in Finland in 2017

Michael of Kent made a visit to Finland in 2017, during which he visited Helsinki, Espoo, Porvoo, Pori, and Tampere.

=== Sport ===
Michael was a part of the Royal Military Academy Sandhurst rowing crew that won the Maiden Fours at Bedford in 1961. He competed for Great Britain in the 1971 FIBT World Bobsleigh Championships but crashed and failed to finish the event. He was official non-travelling reserve for the 1972 Winter Olympics. He took part in the 1970 London to Mexico World Cup Rally in an Austin Maxi, but he and his crew failed to finish the event.

== Media scrutiny ==
In 2002, both Michael and his wife were the subject of criticism over the rent paid on their accommodation at Kensington Palace following scrutiny by the House of Commons Public Accounts committee on the cost of royal palaces and whether they were value for money. The committee had called on the Queen to evict its residents and put the apartments on a more commercial footing. When it was claimed that the couple paid a rent of only £69 per week for the use of their apartments at Kensington Palace, Buckingham Palace announced that "The Queen is paying the rent for Prince and Princess Michael of Kent's apartment at a commercial rate of £120,000 annually, from her own private funds. This rent payment by The Queen is in recognition of the Royal engagements and work for various charities which Prince and Princess Michael of Kent have undertaken at their own expense, and without any public funding."

In 2003, Michael's judgment was questioned as he developed a close working relationship with businessman Michael Wynne-Parker, who had a history of financial misconduct, bans from serving as a director, and had been described by a judge as having "the modus operandi of a crook". Wynne-Parker had organised and accompanied the prince on official trips to Estonia, helping arrange meetings with politicians and business figures, which raised concerns about credibility and vetting. Prince Michael denied receiving "any fees or expenses or been paid in any way" by Wynne-Parker and added that he was not aware of his reputation.

Michael has been scrutinized for financial assistance given to him by exiled Russian oligarch Boris Berezovsky through offshore companies, with a reported total of £320,000 in payments over the period 2002–2008. In an interview with The Sunday Times, Berezovsky stated, "There is nothing underhand or improper about the financial assistance I have given Prince Michael. It is a matter between friends."

In May 2021, reports were published stating that Michael was "selling access" to Vladimir Putin's political representatives. Footage from a Zoom call was released of Michael, alongside Simon Isaacs, 4th Marquess of Reading, interacting with undercover reporters posing as business executives seeking to make contacts with the Kremlin. In the video, he assured the men that his close ties with the country would be of benefit, and that he could introduce them to high-ranking figures within the Russian government in exchange for money. The call took place the day after the European Union imposed sanctions on the Kremlin. Michael was being offered £143,000 for a proposal and £36,000 a month by the faux businessmen, which he expressed satisfaction with. The Marquess claimed that Michael was the Queen's "unofficial ambassador to Russia" and had direct access to Putin. He later stated that he had "overpromised", while Michael said that he had not had contact with Putin since 2003. In a 2019 interview, Michael stated that he visited Russia twice a year as part of his work for the Russo-British Chamber of Commerce.

Marina Litvinenko denounced Michael's actions, saying that it demonstrated that he did not "care about human rights, democracy, about the people who are dying in Russia or what he did to your own citizens on UK soil". Conservative MP Bob Seely released a statement saying, in part: "We have sanctions against President Putin's regime for good reason. I'd love to know what Prince Michael thinks he is doing by making the UK's values and standards look optional."

== Titles, styles, honours and arms ==
=== Titles ===
==== Official ====
Royal monogram

As a child of a younger son of a British sovereign, he is styled as a British prince with the prefix His Royal Highness and a territorial designation deriving from his father's dukedom: "His Royal Highness Prince Michael of Kent".

==== Other titles ====
Calabar, Nigeria

- A person of honour and high standing in the Efik Eburutu Kingdom (Efik: Ada Idagha Ke Efik Eburutu) (2017).

=== Honours ===
- 2 June 1953: Recipient of the Queen Elizabeth II Coronation Medal
- 6 February 1977: Recipient of the Queen Elizabeth II Silver Jubilee Medal
- 18 January 2001: Knight of Justice of the Most Venerable Order of Saint John (KStJ)
- 6 February 2002: Recipient of the Queen Elizabeth II Golden Jubilee Medal
- 2 June 2003: Knight Grand Cross of the Royal Victorian Order (GCVO)
  - 4 July 1992: Knight Commander of the Royal Victorian Order (KCVO)
- 6 February 2012: Recipient of the Queen Elizabeth II Diamond Jubilee Medal
- 19 October 2015: Recipient of the Canadian Forces' Decoration (CD)
- 6 February 2022: Recipient of the Queen Elizabeth II Platinum Jubilee Medal
- 6 May 2023: Recipient of the King Charles III Coronation Medal

==== Foreign ====
- UN: Recipient of the United Nations Medal for UNFICYP (1971)
- Russia: Member of the Order of Friendship (4 November 2009 – 4 March 2022)
- Two Sicilies: Knight Grand Cross of the Royal Order of Francis I (19 August 2017)
- Peru: Grand Cross of the Order of the Sun (2 November 1994)

==== Wear of orders, decorations, and medals ====
The ribbons worn regularly by Michael in undress uniform are as follows:

==== Honorary military appointments ====
Canada

- (Canada) Colonel-in-Chief, The Essex and Kent Scottish (14 November 2001 – present)

United Kingdom

- (United Kingdom) Honorary Commodore, Royal Naval Reserve (1 April 1994 – 2004)
- (United Kingdom) Honorary Commodore, Maritime Volunteer Service
- (United Kingdom) Honorary Rear Admiral, Royal Naval Reserve (2004–2015)
- (United Kingdom) Honorary Vice Admiral, Royal Naval Reserve (9 March 2015 – present)
- (United Kingdom) Honorary Auxiliary Commodore, Royal Naval Auxiliary Service (1990)
- (United Kingdom) Commodore-in-Chief, Maritime Reserves (2006–present)
- (United Kingdom) Honorary Colonel, British Army (10 November 2010 – present)
- (United Kingdom) Senior Colonel, The King's Royal Hussars
- (United Kingdom) Regimental Colonel, Honourable Artillery Company (2009–2012)
- (United Kingdom) Royal Honorary Colonel, Honourable Artillery Company (31 January 2012 – present). (member since 1981)
- (United Kingdom) Honorary Air Commodore of RAF Benson (27 June 2002 – 2012)
- (United Kingdom) Honorary Air Marshal of RAF Benson (1 March 2012 – present)

=== Fellowships ===
- Grand Master of the Order of Mark Master Masons of England
- Chartered Institution of Highways and Transportation
- Chartered Institute of Linguists
- Royal Aeronautical Society
- Society of Genealogists
- Institute of Road Safety Officers
- Institute of the Motor Industry

=== Memberships ===
- Liveryman of the Honourable Company of Air Pilots
- Liveryman of the Worshipful Company of Clothworkers
- Liveryman of the Worshipful Company of Coachmakers and Coach Harness Makers
- Liveryman of the Worshipful Company of Scientific Instrument Makers

=== Honorary academic degrees and awards ===
==== Degrees and appointments ====
- 1998: Plekhanov Academy of Economics, Honorary Doctorate
- 2003: Sinerghia Economics and Finance Institute, Honorary Professor
- 2012: St Petersburg University of Humanities and Social Sciences, Honorary Doctorate

==== Awards ====
- 2002: The International Man of the Year Award, Plekhanov Economics Academy
- 2003: The "Glory of Russia", Plekhanov Economics Academy

=== Arms ===
Coat of arms of Prince Michael of Kent
| Notes As a descendant of George V, the Prince Michael's arms are based on the Royal Arms. The following explains the way in which his arms are differenced from those of the King. Coronet Coronet of a Grandchild of the Sovereign Crest On the coronet of children of other sons of the Sovereign, composed of four crosses-pattées alternated with four strawberry leaves a lion statant guardant or, crowned with the like coronet and differenced with a label as in the Arms. Supporters The Royal Supporters differenced with the like coronet and label. Orders The Royal Victorian Order circlet. VICTORIA Other elements The Royal Arms differenced with a five-point label - the usual differentiation for a male-line grandchild of a British monarch. The first, third and fifth points bear a red cross, and the second and fourth points bear a blue anchor. Banner Symbolism As with the Royal Arms of the United Kingdom. The first and fourth quarters are the arms of England, the second of Scotland, the third of Ireland. |

== Issue ==
| Name | Birth | Marriage | | Children |
|---|---|---|---|---|
| Lord Frederick Windsor | 6 April 1979 | 12 September 2009 | Sophie Winkleman | Maud Windsor; Isabella Windsor |
| Lady Gabriella Kingston | 23 April 1981 | 18 May 2019 | Thomas Kingston (died 25 February 2024) | None |

== See also ==
- British prince
- List of current British princes and princesses

== Notes ==
Prince Michael of Kent House of Windsor Born: 4 July 1942
Lines of succession
| Preceded by Estella Taylor | Line of succession to the British throne son of George, Duke of Kent grandson of George V | Succeeded by Lord Frederick Windsor |
Order of precedence in England and Wales
| Preceded by The Earl of Snowdon | Gentlemen; HRH Prince Michael of Kent | Succeeded by Alex Norris as Lord High Chancellor of Great Britain |
Order of precedence in Scotland
| Preceded by The Earl of Snowdon | Gentlemen; HRH Prince Michael of Kent | Succeeded by Lords Lieutenant (see list here) |
Order of precedence in Northern Ireland
| Preceded by The Earl of Snowdon | Gentlemen; HRH Prince Michael of Kent | Succeeded by Lords Lieutenant (see list here) (during term of office and within bounds of counties and cities) |
