= Lucilla Bonaccorsi =

Italian fashion designer

- Born: Milan, Italy
- Occupation: Fashion designer
- Spouse: Filippo Richeri Vivaldi Pasqua
- Parent(s): Prince Lucio Bonaccorsi di Reburdone (father); Luisa Beccaria (mother)

Donna Lucilla Bonaccorsi di Reburdone is an Italian fashion designer. Along with her mother, Luisa Beccaria, she is a co-designer for the Luisa Beccaria fashion house.

== Early life and family ==
Bonaccorsi was born and raised in Milan. She is one of five children of Sicilian aristocrat Prince Lucio Bonaccorsi di Redburdone and Milanese fashion designer Luisa Beccaria. Growing up, she spent summers at Feudo del Castelluccio, her family's 18th-century castle in Sicily near Noto.

== Career ==
Bonaccorsi is co-designer for her mother's fashion label, Luisa Beccaria. She joined the design team in 2006.

== Personal life ==
In March 2017, she announced her engagement to Filippo Richeri Vivaldi Pasqua. Their engagement party was held in Milan in May 2017 at a restaurant owned by her family. The couple married later that year at her family's castle. She wore a gown designed by her mother for the occasion.
