= Sophie Winkleman =

British actress (born 1980)

Sophie Winkleman Lady Frederick Windsor
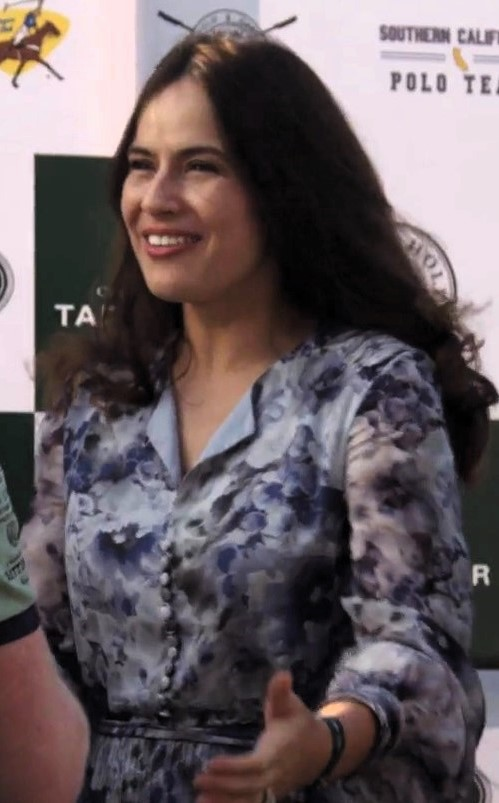
- Winkleman in 2014
- Born: 5 August 1980 (age 46); Primrose Hill, London, England
- Education: Trinity Hall, Cambridge (BA)
- Occupation: Actress
- Years active: 1997–present
- Spouse: Lord Frederick Windsor (m. 2009)
- Children: 2
- Relatives: Claudia Winkleman (paternal half-sister); Sally Soames (aunt)
- Family: House of Windsor (by marriage)

Sophie Lara Winkleman (born 5 August 1980), styled as Lady Frederick Windsor, is a British actress. She is married to Lord Frederick Windsor, the son of Prince Michael of Kent and second cousin of King Charles III.

== Early life ==
Sophie Lara Winkleman was born on 5 August 1980 in Primrose Hill, London. Her father, Barry Winkleman, created The Times Atlas of World History whilst publishing director of The Times, and her mother is the children's author Cindy Black. The television presenter Claudia Winkleman is her half-sister from her father's first marriage to Eve Pollard. Sophie Winkleman was educated at the City of London School for Girls and at Trinity Hall, Cambridge, where she studied English literature. She joined the Cambridge Footlights and wrote and performed in the comic revue Far Too Happy, which toured Britain for three months and gained the troupe's first Perrier Comedy Award nomination in 20 years. She joined the National Youth Theatre of Great Britain in 1997. She is a soprano, reprising her singing in the First Love series for Sky Arts.

== Career ==
=== Television ===
Winkleman's credits include recurring roles in series including Big Suze in Peep Show, numerous roles in Harry & Paul, Joely in White Teeth, Fiona in The Trial of Tony Blair, Abby in Plus One, Katerina in Red Dwarf: Back to Earth, Donna in Lead Balloon, Prudence in Keen Eddie, Elle Kensington in Chasing Alice, Regan Peverill in the pilot episode of Lewis, Angela Warren in Agatha Christie's Poirot (in the episode "Five Little Pigs"), Princess Eleanor in The Palace, Ghislaine in Robin Hood, Alice Shadwell in Dalziel and Pascoe, Ann Hamilton in Death in Paradise, Jill in TV Land's Hot in Cleveland, Sharon Kirby in CSI: Miami and Dorothy Gibson in Titanic.

Winkleman was nominated for Best Newcomer by the BBC for her performance as Clara Gold in Waking the Dead. Winkleman made her debut on American television as the star of the NBC sitcom 100 Questions as main character Charlotte Payne. She guest starred as Joy's younger sister on one episode of Hot in Cleveland and was a recurring guest on the hit series Two and a Half Men as Zoey, the British girlfriend of Walden Schmidt.

=== Stage ===
Winkleman's roles while at Trinity Hall, Cambridge included the Bride in García Lorca's Blood Wedding, which toured amphitheatres in Greece, Elizabeth in Six Degrees of Separation, which played at the Edinburgh Festival, Abigail in Arthur Miller's The Crucible, Dockdaisy in Bertolt Brecht's The Resistible Rise of Arturo Ui, Kate in Alan Ayckbourn's Confusions, Madame de Merteuil in Christopher Hampton's Les Liaisons Dangereuses and Fraulein Kost in Kander and Ebb's Cabaret all at the ADC. Winkleman's stage career after Cambridge includes a season at the Royal Shakespeare Company, where she played Veronique in Laurence Boswell's adaptation of Beauty and the Beast and a summer in Bath with the Peter Hall Company playing a variety of roles including Archangela in Galileo's Daughter, a new play by Timberlake Wertenbaker, Violet in George Bernard Shaw's Man and Superman, and Charlotte in Molière's Don Juan. In 2012, she played Helena in Eric Idle's musical What About Dick at the Orpheum Theatre in downtown Los Angeles.

=== Film ===
Winkleman's film credits include the lead roles in the films Shattered and Love Live Long, written and directed by Mike Figgis. Winkleman played the comic role of Debbie Levine in Pathe's romantic comedy Suzie Gold and the older Susan Pevensie in the Disney film The Chronicles of Narnia: The Lion, the Witch and the Wardrobe (2005). Other film roles include the leads in the shorts Seared, Love Letters, The Lost Domain – a cinematic take on Alain-Fournier's Le Grand Meaulnes (1913) – and Post, directed by Debs Gardner-Paterson.

=== Radio ===
Winkleman is a regular in BBC Radio 4 comedy and drama. She is among the cast of comedy programmes such as Marcus Brigstocke's Giles Wemmbley-Hogg Goes Off, and such afternoon plays as Tea for Two. She played Polly Pot in P. G. Wodehouse's Uncle Fred in the Springtime with Alfred Molina and Rufus Sewell, Gloria in Bernard Shaw's You Never Can Tell, and Zoe in Alan Ayckbourn's Henceforward, alongside Jared Harris, all for Radio 4. She played the role of Sasha in Von Ribbentrop's Watch, a historical drama, Anna Freud in the play Dr. Freud Will See You Now, Mrs. Hitler, by Laurence Marks and Maurice Gran, and the Amazon warrior princess Penthesilea alongside Alistair McGowan and Stephen Mangan in the Radio 4 comic fantasy series ElvenQuest, by Anil Gupta and Richard Pinto. She has starred in several Doctor Who plays for Radio 4.

== Personal life ==
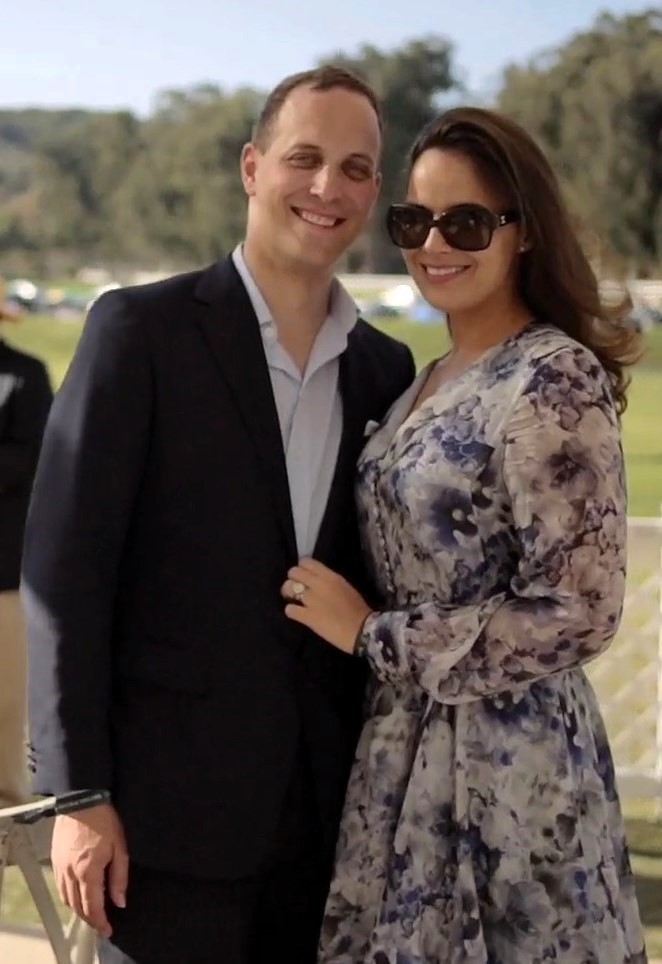
Lord and Lady Frederick Windsor in 2014

Winkleman married Lord Frederick Windsor, the son of Prince and Princess Michael of Kent, in Hampton Court Palace on 12 September 2009. By virtue of her marriage, she became entitled to be styled as Lady Frederick Windsor, but continues to use her own name in her professional career. On 15 August 2013, the couple had a daughter, who was born at the Ronald Reagan UCLA Medical Center in Los Angeles, California, and is the first grandchild of Prince and Princess Michael of Kent. Their second daughter was born in 2016 at Chelsea and Westminster Hospital.

In November 2017, Winkleman was seriously injured in a head-on car crash, suffering a broken back and foot. She was a back-seat passenger in a car when another vehicle struck her car after swerving to avoid a deer. It was reported that she would not suffer long-term problems, but faced weeks of recuperation.

In June 2020, she became royal patron of the Children's Surgery Foundation. The following month, she became first female patron of School-Home Support, and in June 2022, she presented the Radio 4 Appeal on its behalf.

In February 2025, she spoke at a conference for the Alliance for Responsible Citizenship, alongside figures including Jordan Peterson, Nigel Farage and Peter Thiel. She warned of the adverse effects of excessive technology use, particularly in the education systems.

== Filmography ==
=== Film ===
Year	Title	Role	Notes
2003	Chasing Alice	Elle Kensington	Television film
2004	Suzie Gold	Debby Levine	
2004	AD/BC: A Rock Opera	Wise Man	Television film
2005	The Chronicles of Narnia: The Lion, the Witch and the Wardrobe	Older Susan	
2007	The Trial of Tony Blair	Fiona	Television film
2007	Shattered	Natalie Encore	
2008	Love Live Long	Rachel	
2008	Seared	Stranger	Short film
2011	Love Letters		Short film
2012	What About Dick?	Helena	
2023	Wonka	The Countess	

=== Television ===
Year	Title	Role	Notes
2002	Ultimate Force	Woman in Bank	Episode: "The Killing House"
2002	White Teeth	Joely	2 episodes
2002	Waking the Dead	Joanna Gold / Clara Gold	Episode: "Thin Air"
2003	Keen Eddie	Prudence	Episode: "Horse Heir"
2003	Agatha Christie's Poirot	Angela Warren	Episode: "Five Little Pigs"
2005–2010	Peep Show	Big Suze	Recurring role
2006	Lewis	Regan Peverill	Episode: "Reputation"
2006	Dalziel and Pascoe	Alice Shadwell	Episode: "A Death in the Family"
2007–2012	Harry & Paul	Various roles	Main role
2008	The Palace	Princess Eleanor	Main role
2009	Plus One	Abby	Episode: "Black and White and Red All Over"
2009	Kingdom	Kate	Episode: "Series 3, Episode 1"
2009	Red Dwarf	Katerina	Episode: "Back to Earth"
2009	Robin Hood	Ghislaine	Episode: "Bad Blood"
2010	100 Questions	Charlotte Payne	Main role
2011	CSI: Miami	Sharon Kirby	Episode: "Last Stand"
2011	Lead Balloon	Donna	Recurring role
2011	Phineas and Ferb	Additional Voices	Episode: "That's the Spirit / The Curse of Candace"
2011	Death in Paradise	Ann Hamilton	Episode: "Spot the Difference"
2011–2015	Two and a Half Men	Zoey	Recurring role
2012	Titanic	Dorothy Gibson	4 episodes
2015	Hot in Cleveland	Jill	Episode: "We Could Be Royals"
2016–2018	Milo Murphy's Law	Additional Voices / Time Ape	3 episodes
2018	Trust	Margot	Recurring role
2019	Endeavour	Isobel Humbolt	Episode: "Apollo"
2019	Four Weddings and a Funeral	Harper Dylan	Episode: "Love, Chalet"
2019–2023	Sanditon	Lady Susan	Recurring role
2020	Strike	Kinvara Chiswell	Recurring role
2022	This Is Going to Hurt	Kathleen	Episode: "Episode Six"
2024	Belgravia: The Next Chapter	Duchess of Rochester	3 episodes
2025	Wild Cherry	Frances Frederick	Main cast
2025	The Great Christmas Bake Off	Herself	Christmas special

=== Audio ===
Year	Title	Role	Notes
2009	Doctor Who: The Eighth Doctor Adventures	Kelly Westwood	2 episodes
2017	Torchwood One	Rachel Allan	3 episodes
2018	Doctor Who: The Monthly Adventures	Sofia	Episode: "Serpent in the Silver Mask"

== Theatre ==
Year	Title	Role	Venue	Notes	Ref.
2001	Far Too Happy	Ensemble	New Pavilion Theatre, Rhyl & others	with Footlights	
2003	Beauty and the Beast	Veronique / Vanity Table	Royal Shakespeare Theatre, Stratford-upon-Avon		
2004	Don Juan	Charlotte	Theatre Royal, Bath		
2004	Man and Superman	Violet Robinson	Theatre Royal, Bath		
2004	Galileo's Daughter	Arcangela	Theatre Royal, Bath		

== Bibliography ==
- Winkleman, Sophie (17 December 2022). "The uncomplaining bravery of the senior royals". The Spectator.
