= Gabriella Teychenné =

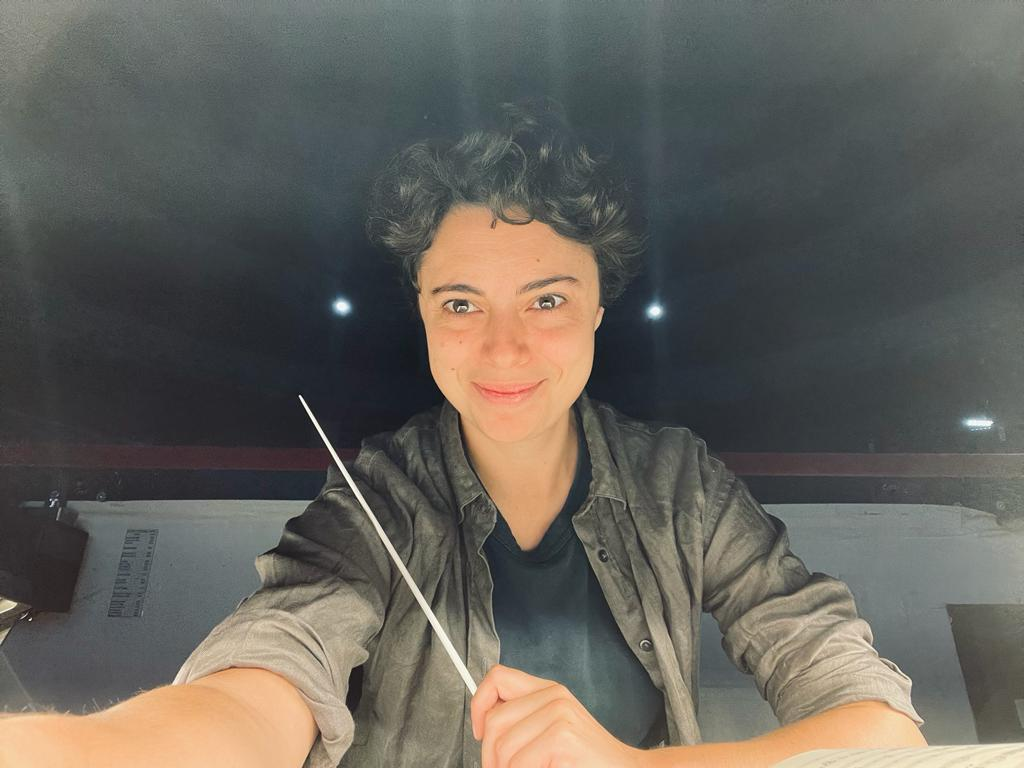
- Gabriella Teychenné at the Bayerische Staatsoper

Background information
- Born: 1993 (age 32–33)
- Origin: Amersham, England
- Occupation: conductor
- Instruments: conductor; violinist
- Years active: 2016–present
- Website: https://gteychenne.com/

Gabriella Teychenné is an English conductor of symphony, opera, and contemporary music.

== Early life ==
Gabriella Teychenné grew up in Amersham, England, receiving instruction on the violin from the age of 4 and piano from 7, and attending Godstowe School. Her father, Michael Teychenné, was a self-taught musician and conductor who worked for many years with orchestras within and outside of Buckinghamshire. Her mother is of Argentinian birth. She attended Oundle School, where she held academic and music scholarships, followed by the University of Cambridge at Trinity College, where she joined the Human, Social, and Political Science tripos and read political philosophy. She continued her musical education in London at the Royal College of Music, and studied conducting with Leonid Korchmar at the Conservatoire of St Petersburg, and with Paavo Järvi in a masterclass.

== Career ==
Conducting Style

Since 2017, Teychenné has frequently been engaged by the London Philharmonic Orchestra as assistant conductor to Vladimir Jurowski and to Edward Gardner, and has also assisted at the Hamburg Staatsoper. Following her studies in Russia, she has been engaged internationally by various orchestras and opera houses including the Luzerner Theater, Philharmonia Orchestra, BBC Singers, BBC Symphony Orchestra, Oulu Symphony Orchestra, Kuopio Symphony Orchestra, Birmingham Contemporary Music Group, Ensemble Contrechamps, Residentie Orkest, Orchestre de chambre de Genève, and ensemble unitedberlin. Teychenné has presented on BBC Radio 3 and is also the subject of an article on the station's web site.

== See also ==
- BBC Inside Music: Experience some deep listening with conductor Gabriella Teychenné.
- How to become – and succeed as – a conductor. The British-Argentinian conductor Gabriella Teychenné shared her curiosity about music's power to communicate with listeners to Radio 3’s Inside Music – here she offers insights on what it's actually like to stand on a podium and direct groups of seasoned musicians.
- Xenakis: Music & Maths review – visceral intensity takes us beyond theory. 'Exactly the right mix of wildness and virtuosity by BCMG under conductor Gabriella Teychenné'.
- Mozarts Oper «Figaro» feiert Premiere im Luzerner Theater: Die sexuelle Revolution bleibt aus. 'Despite the fun and comedy, this 'Figaro' is also an evening of great and intimate feelings. The basis for this is laid by the conductor Gabriella Teychenné at the podium of the Lucerne Symphony Orchestra. She drives the comedic hustle and bustle forward with a bouncy, accented and quick tempi. But she creates a sound of astonishing abundance and warmth, transparency and depth'.
