= Princess Michael of Kent =

Member of the British royal family (born 1945)

Marie-Christine
- Princess Michael of Kent
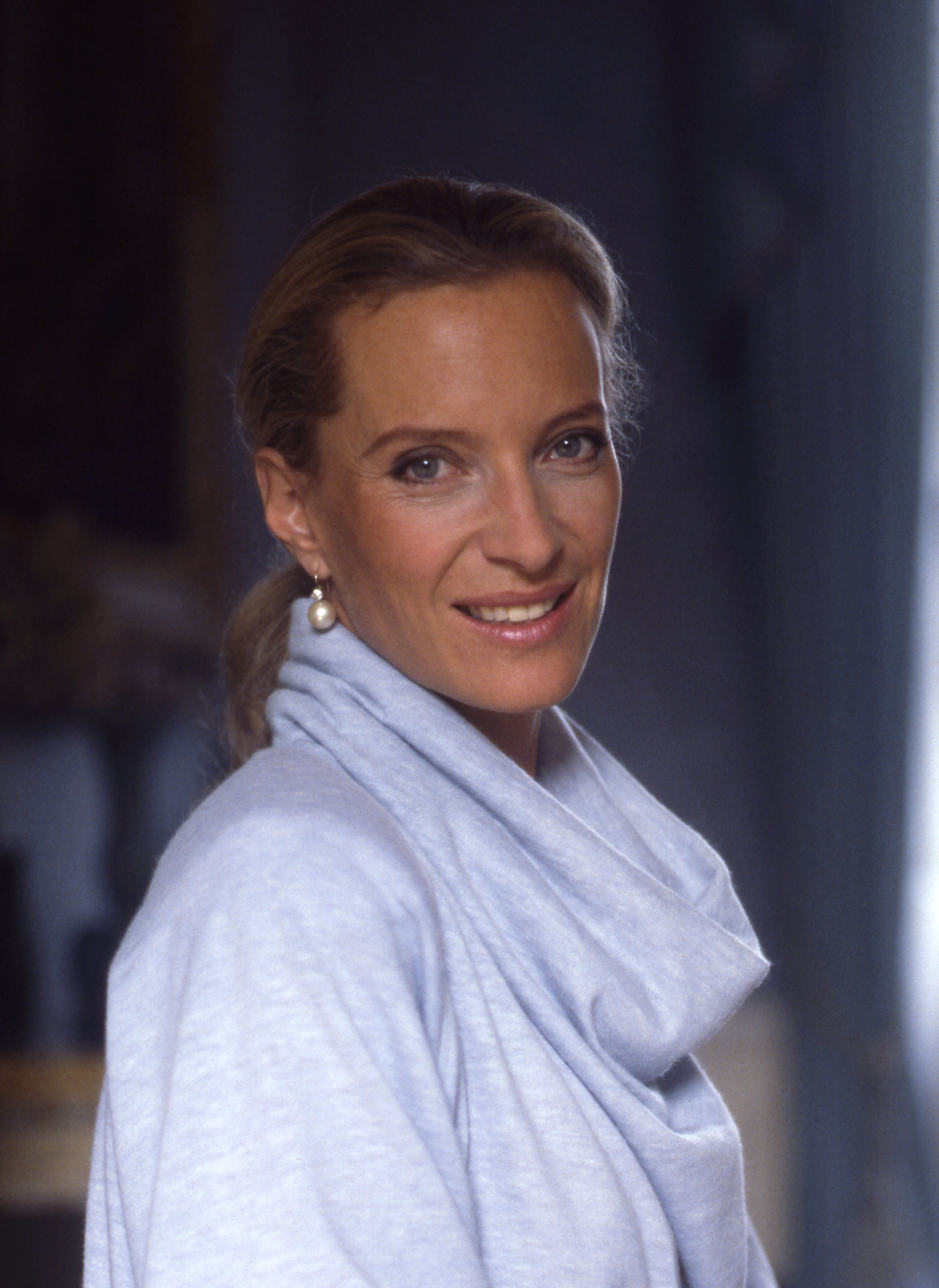
- Photograph by Allan Warren, 1999
- Born: Baroness Marie-Christine Anna Agnes Hedwig Ida von Reibnitz; 15 January 1945 (age 81); Karlsbad, Greater German Reich (now Czech Republic)
- Spouses: Thomas Troubridge (m. 1971; ann. 1978) Prince Michael of Kent (m. 1978)
- Issue: Lord Frederick Windsor; Lady Gabriella Kingston
- House: Reibnitz (by birth); Troubridge (by marriage); Windsor (by marriage)
- Father: Baron Günther von Reibnitz
- Mother: Countess Maria Anna Szapáry von Muraszombath

Princess Michael of Kent (born Baroness Marie-Christine Anna Agnes Hedwig Ida von Reibnitz, 15 January 1945) is a member of the British royal family. She is married to Prince Michael of Kent, a grandson of King George V. Marie-Christine worked as an interior designer and later became an author, publishing several books on European royalty.

== Early life and ancestry ==
Baroness Marie-Christine Anna Agnes Hedwig Ida von Reibnitz was born on 15 January 1945 in the German-populated Sudetenland under Nazi-occupied Czechoslovakia. She was born at the Jagdschloss Inselthal on her mother's estate in Tachau, which her mother had inherited from her own mother, Princess Hedwig of Windisch-Graetz. The family had relocated to the hunting lodge after their primary residence, Kladrau Abbey overlooking the lake, was seized by the German military to serve as their main headquarters. Her birth was subsequently registered in Carlsbad (now Karlovy Vary).

She is the younger daughter of Freiherr Günther Hubertus von Reibnitz (1894–1983) and his second wife, Countess Maria Anna Carolina Franziska Walburga Bernadette Szapáry von Muraszombath, Széchysziget und Szapár (1911–1988), the daughter of Count Friedrich Szapáry von Muraszombath, Széchysziget und Szapár, who served as the Austro-Hungarian Ambassador to Saint Petersburg at the outbreak of the First World War. Her Austrian maternal grandmother was Princess Hedwig von Windisch-Graetz (1878–1918), the eldest daughter of Alfred III, Prince of Windisch-Grätz, who served as the 11th Minister-President of Austria and was President of the Imperial Council from 1895 to 1918.

She was born into the Reibnitz family, an ancient (Uradel) noble house from Lower Silesia. The family's surname is toponymic, derived from their ancestral seat of Rybnica (historically recorded as de Rybnicz). The earliest known member of the lineage, the knight Henry (Henricus), appears in historical records on 20 March 1288 in Cieplice Slaskie as a witness to a charter issued by his suzerain, the Piast duke Bolko I the Strict of Jawor. Due to the lack of earlier documentation, the exact ethnic origin of Henry—whether a local Silesian or a migrant in the course of the medieval Ostsiedlung—remains undetermined in historiography. In 1335, the fiefdom of Rybnica was confirmed to Henry's descendant Konrad (Cunadus) by Bolko I's successor, Duke Bolko II the Small. On her paternal line, she descends from the Burgraves of Dohna, Herrand III von Trauttmansdorff, and the Nostitz family, lineages that also appear among the ancestors of Queen Elizabeth II.

Through her mother, Marie‑Christine descends from the House of Lobkowicz and numerous other Austrian princely families, connections that link her by blood to her husband, Queen Elizabeth II and King Charles III. She is also descended from Henry II of France and his wife, Catherine de' Medici, and from Henry II's longtime mistress and rival of Catherine, Diane de Poitiers, a connection she has noted in her historical writing. Through this line, she also descends from Peter Paul Rubens, the Flemish Baroque painter and diplomat who was knighted by both the Habsburg and Stuart monarchs.

Marie‑Christine's father was a member of the Nazi Party and served as a cavalry officer in the Waffen-SS during the Second World War. As the Red Army advanced near the end of the war, the family abandoned their estates and moved to Bavaria, then part of the American-occupied zone of Germany. Her parents divorced in 1946, and Marie‑Christine, her mother, and her elder brother, Baron Friedrich von Reibnitz (born 1942), moved to Australia, where she was educated at Convent of the Sacred Heart, Rose Bay (now Kincoppal-Rose Bay). In the early 1960s, she lived with her father on his farm in Portuguese-ruled Mozambique. She later studied History of Fine and Decorative Art at the Victoria and Albert Museum.

== Personal life ==
Marie‑Christine's first husband was the English banker Thomas Troubridge (1939–2015), the younger brother of Sir Peter Troubridge, 6th Baronet. The couple met at a boar hunt in Germany and were married on 14 September 1971 at Chelsea Old Church, London. They separated in 1973 and were civilly divorced in 1977. The marriage was ecclesiastically annulled by Pope Paul VI in May 1978.

One month after the annulment, on 30 June 1978, at a civil ceremony at the City Hall (Wiener Rathaus) in Vienna, Austria, she married Prince Michael of Kent, the son of Prince George, Duke of Kent, and Princess Marina of Greece and Denmark. Michael is a grandson of King George V. Marie-Christine has named Lord Mountbatten as their matchmaker.

Michael presented her with a two-stone sapphire-and-diamond ring made from stones that had belonged to his mother. At the civil ceremony, Marie‑Christine wore a cream two‑piece suit – blazer and knee-length skirt – by Hardy Amies. For the ball held after the wedding, she wore the City of London diamond fringe tiara and a cream dress from Bellville Sassoon. Upon their marriage, she was accorded the style and title of Her Royal Highness Princess Michael of Kent, the female equivalent of her husband's title. After receiving permission from Pope John Paul II (Pope Paul VI had barred them from having a Catholic wedding), the couple later received a blessing of their marriage in a Roman Catholic ceremony on 29 June 1983 at Archbishop's House, London.

Since the Act of Settlement 1701 prohibited anyone who married a Roman Catholic from succeeding to the throne, Michael (then 15th in line) lost his succession rights upon marrying Marie‑Christine. He was reinstated to the line of succession on 26 March 2015 with the passing of the Succession to the Crown Act 2013. Their children are members of the Church of England and have retained their succession rights since birth.

Marie-Christine and Michael have two children:

- Lord Frederick Windsor, born 6 April 1979 at St Mary's Hospital, London, who married Sophie Winkleman on 12 September 2009. They have two daughters: Maud (born 15 August 2013) and Isabella (born 16 January 2016).
- Lady Gabriella Kingston, born 23 April 1981 at St Mary's Hospital, London, who married Thomas Kingston on 18 May 2019. Her husband died on 25 February 2024 in the Cotswolds, Gloucestershire, leaving her widowed at 42.

Marie-Christine was linked romantically by the press to John Warner and the businessmen Ward Hunt and Mikhail Kravchenko. She also had a friendship with John W. Galbreath and Peter de Savary, the latter of whom gifted her a £150,000 parcel of land on Antigua.

=== Health ===
In 1985, Marie-Christine was hospitalised for a week to undergo treatments for "nervous exhaustion". In 2002, she was treated for skin cancer. In May 2021, it was reported that she was suffering from blood clots after being diagnosed with COVID-19 six months earlier. She is known to have experienced lung problems in childhood. In late 2024, she fell down stairs at her Kensington Palace apartment and broke both wrists ahead of a Christmas lunch at Buckingham Palace hosted by Charles III. At the same time it was reported that she had undergone heart surgery about a year earlier. In March 2026, it was reported that she had suffered a stroke that had left her bedridden.

== Career ==
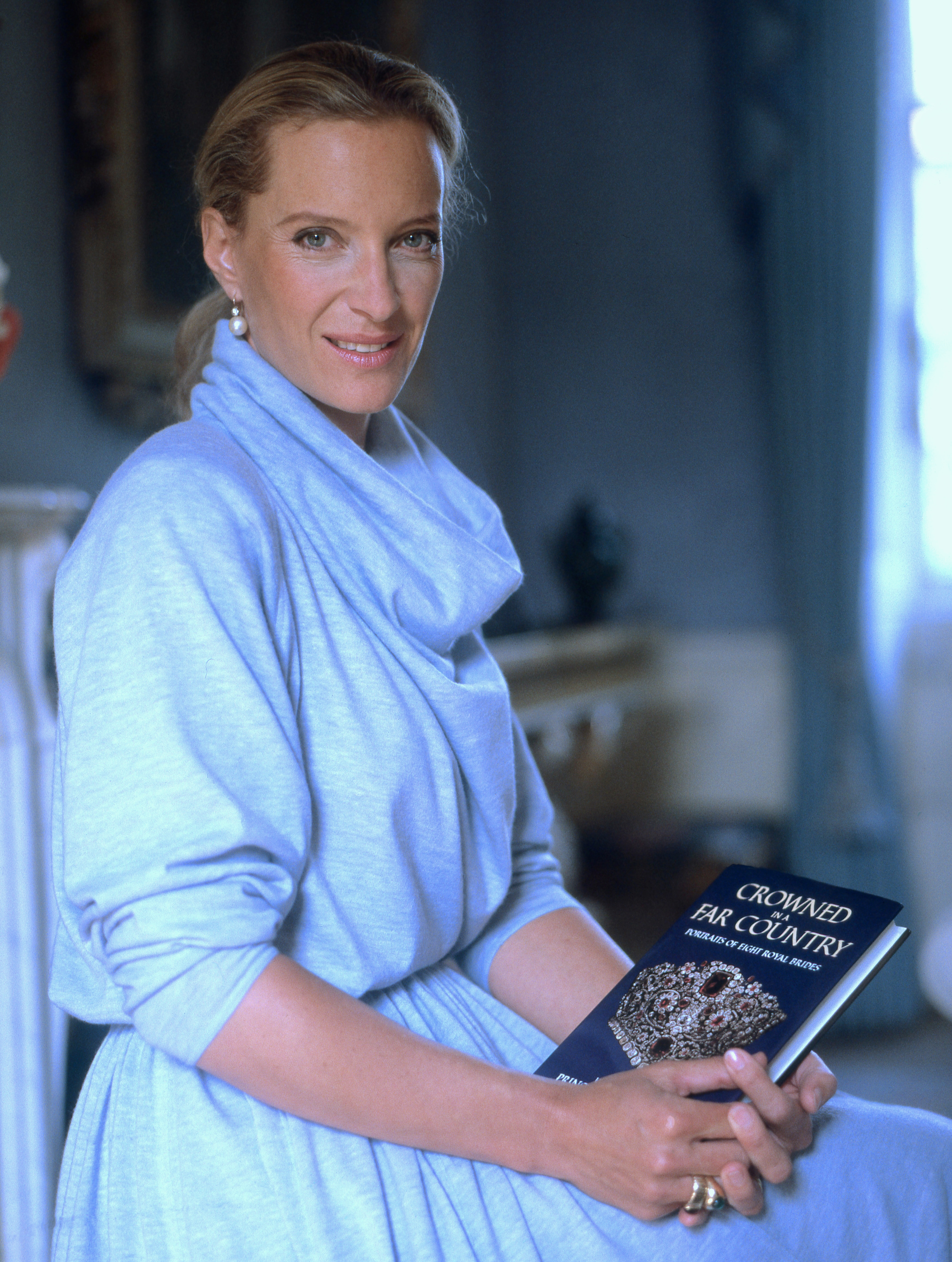
Princess Michael holding her book, 1999

Before her marriage to Michael, Marie-Christine worked as an interior designer. According to a report in The Observer's Pendennis column in September 2007, she later resumed decorating under her original company, Szapar Designs. In 1986, her first book Crowned in a Far Country: Portraits of Eight Royal Brides was published, after which she faced allegations of plagiarism and reached an out-of-court settlement with another author. Her second book, Cupid and the King: Five Royal Paramours, faced similar issues, which she attributed to a researcher who had allegedly submitted notes without due attribution. The book was originally commissioned by Michael Joseph, but after the draft was submitted several months late, it was rejected and later published by HarperCollins. From 2007 to 2011, Marie-Christine served as president of Partridge Fine Art, a gallery in London's New Bond Street, until it went into administration after sustaining substantial multi-year losses. In 2008, she was engaged as a consultant by Galerie Gmurzynska in Switzerland and later became their international ambassador. She also served on the board of the Victoria and Albert Museum, and undertakes lecture tours around the world, speaking on historical subjects at universities, museums, and galleries to promote her books and support her charitable interests. Marie-Christine, whose husband has a strong interest in Russia, was reportedly taking Russian lessons in 2012.

=== Books ===
- Crowned in a Far Country: Portraits of Eight Royal Brides. Weidenfeld and Nicolson. 1986. ISBN 0-297-79010-2.
- Cupid and the King: Five Royal Paramours. HarperCollins. 1991. ISBN 0-00-223911-6.
- The Serpent and The Moon: Two Rivals for the Love of a Renaissance King. Simon & Schuster. 2004. ISBN 0-7432-5104-0.
- The Queen of Four Kingdoms. Constable. 2013. ISBN 978-1472108456.
- Agnès Sorel: Mistress of Beauty. Constable. 2014. ISBN 978-1472119131.
- Quicksilver. Constable. 2015. ISBN 978-1472123060.
- A Cheetah's Tale. Bradt. 2017. ISBN 978-1784770693.

== Royal and charitable activities ==
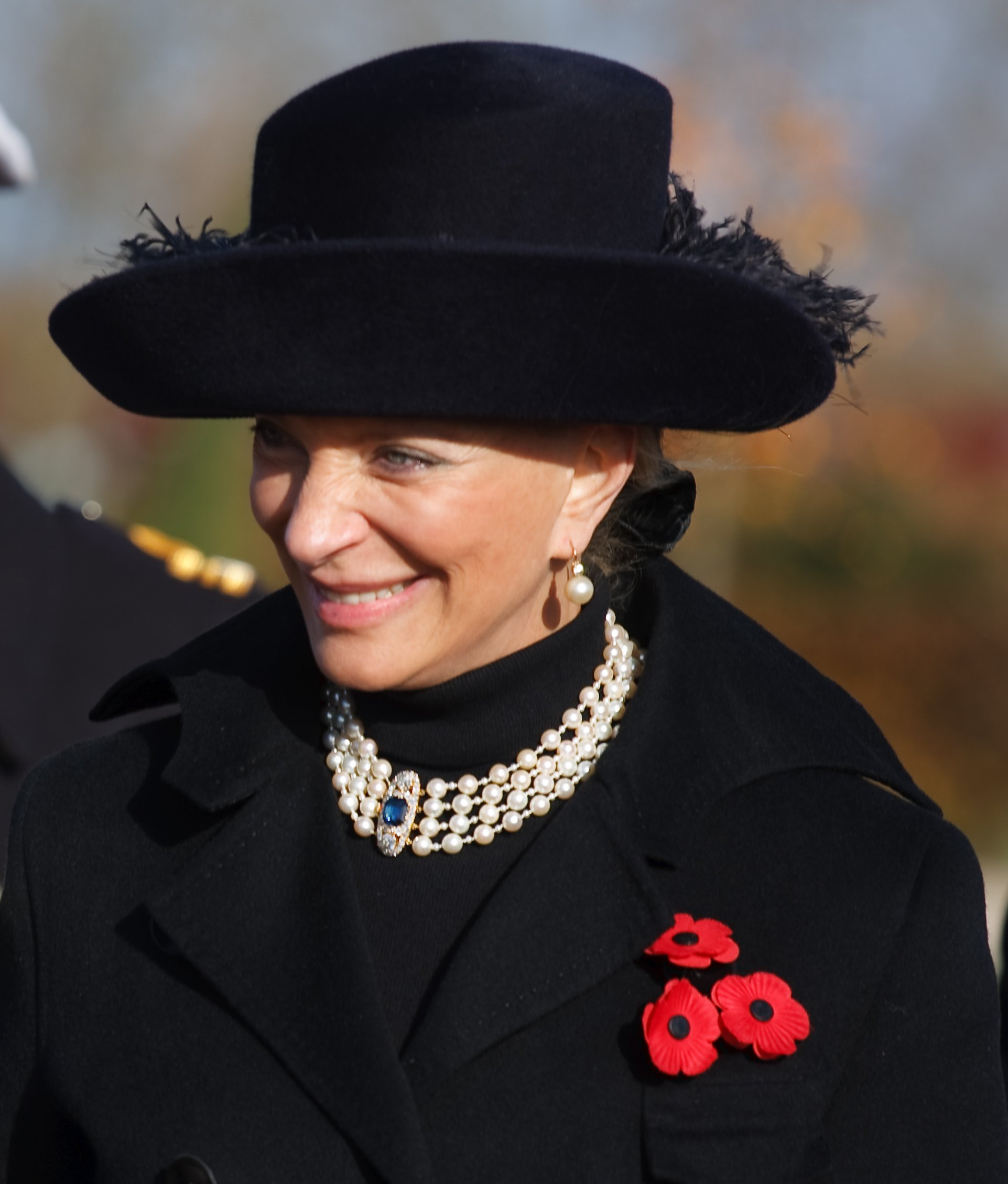
Princess Michael of Kent attending Armistice Day commemorations in Croxall, England, 2008

Marie-Christine and Michael represented the Queen at the Belize independence celebrations and at the coronation of King Mswati III of Eswatini. Michael supports a large number of charities and organisations, and Marie-Christine supports him in his work.

Marie-Christine is the international royal patron of the Cheetah Conservation Fund in Namibia. She is also a Fellow of the Linnean Society of London, a learned society dedicated to natural history and taxonomy.

== Finances ==
Michael has never received a parliamentary annuity or an allowance from the Privy Purse. The couple have had the use of a five-bedroom, five-reception grace and favour apartment at Kensington Palace. Queen Elizabeth II paid the rent for the apartment at a market rate of £120,000 annually from her private funds, with the couple contributing a nominal £70 per week. The rent is paid into the Grant-in-aid, which is provided by the Government for the maintenance of the Occupied Royal Palaces, and is recorded within the overall figures for commercial rents in the Grant-in-aid annual report. According to the British Monarchy Media Centre, the Queen's payment was made "in recognition of the Royal engagements and work for various charities which Prince and Princess Michael of Kent have undertaken at their own expense, and without any public funding".

In 2008, it was announced that Marie-Christine and Michael would begin paying the full £120,000 annual rent from their own funds from 2010. Members of Parliament on the Public Accounts Committee had called for the change after the couple's rental arrangement came to light. They have lived in the apartment since 1979, paying only their utility bills prior to 2002.

== Catholicism ==
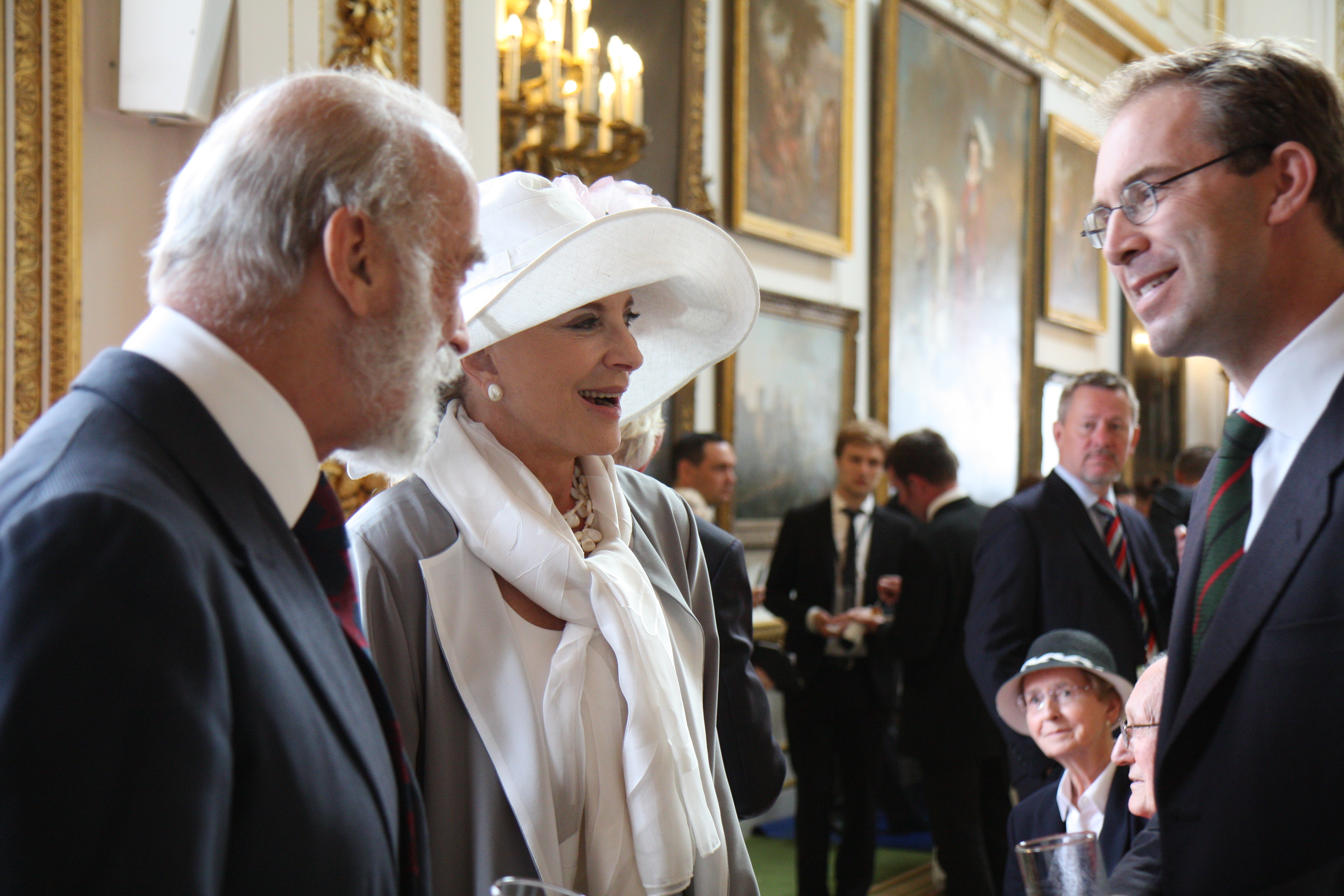
Prince and Princess Michael of Kent with Foreign Office Minister Tobias Ellwood at a First World War Centenary Commemoration event at Lancaster House, 4 August 2014

Marie-Christine is a Roman Catholic and attended several events during Pope Benedict XVI's state visit to the United Kingdom in September 2010. She attended Mass in Westminster Cathedral, where she was seated in the first row among other dignitaries, including Lord and Lady Nicholas Windsor, the Duke of Norfolk, and former Prime Minister Tony Blair; the Pope gave them an audience after Mass. On the final day of the visit, she attended the open-air Mass of beatification for Cardinal John Henry Newman at Cofton Park, Birmingham. Marie-Christine was personally involved in the beatification process and attended several other celebrations relating to it before and after the Cofton Park Mass. She also attended a civic dinner with invited dignitaries and bishops in Birmingham, before attending the Mass and meeting the Pope. In 2008, she had attended the translation of Newman's remains at the Birmingham Oratory.

Marie-Christine represented the Duke of Edinburgh at the launching ceremony of the Green Pilgrimage Network in Assisi, Italy, in 2011. The event was organised by the Alliance of Religions and Conservation (ARC), founded by the Duke of Edinburgh in 1995, in association with the World Wide Fund for Nature (WWF), of which Prince Philip was formerly President. She spoke on the Duke's behalf and led the opening procession.

In 2024, The Times published a letter to the editor co-signed by Marie-Christine and other Catholic and non-Catholic public figures, calling upon the Holy See to preserve what they described as the "magnificent" cultural artifact of the Catholic Church's Traditional Latin Mass.

== Views and controversies ==
Marie-Christine has a long record of statements and incidents that have attracted controversy, including allegations of racist behaviour. The media have reported that she once told an American fashion magazine that she had "more royal blood in her veins than any person to marry into the royal family since Prince Philip". After Lord Mountbatten described her aristocratic lineage to Queen Elizabeth II, the Queen reportedly joked that "she seems a bit too grand for us".

In 2004, she was accused of racially insulting Black diners at a restaurant in New York. A spokesperson acknowledged that she had been angry at the group seated near her but denied that she had told them to "go back to the colonies". In a later interview, she described the group as "a group of rappers", although it included the TV reporter A. J. Calloway, a banker, a lawyer, and a music executive.

In 2005, while promoting one of her books, Marie-Christine gave interviews in which she said Britons should be more concerned about the bloodlines of their children, and claimed that the British media were "excited" by Prince Harry's decision to wear a swastika at a fancy dress party because of the press' "ownership structure", a remark interpreted by some commentators as antisemitic. She added that "nobody would have got excited" had he worn the hammer and sickle.

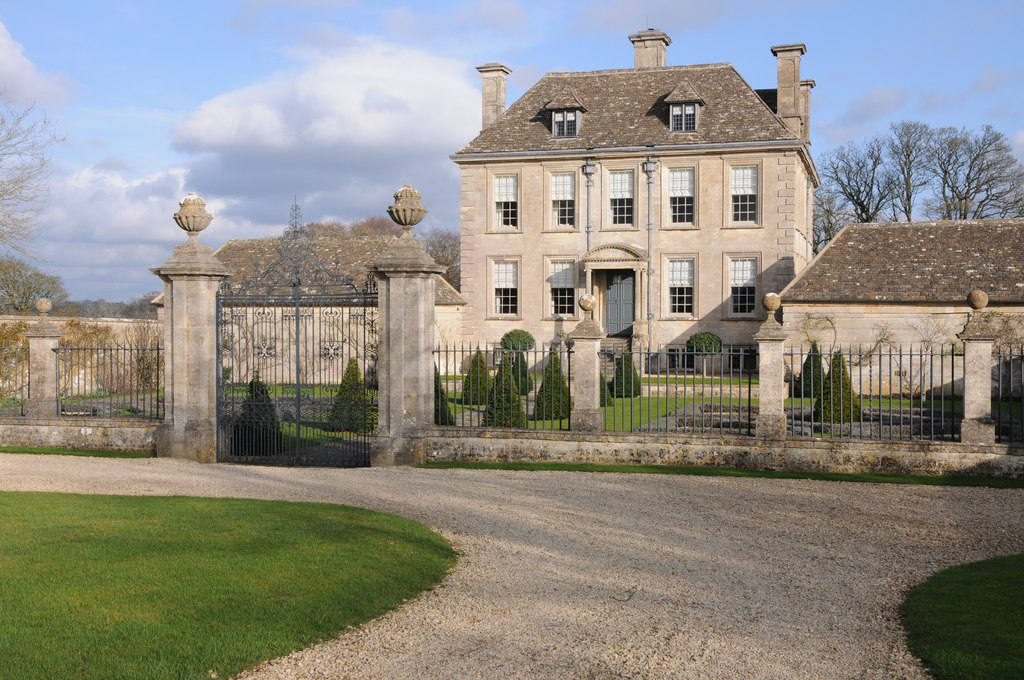
Family country estate: Nether Lypiatt Manor in Thrupp, Gloucestershire, England

That same year, she spoke to News of the World journalist Mazher Mahmood, who was posing as a potential buyer for Nether Lypiatt Manor, the country home she shared with Michael at the time. During the conversation, she described Diana, Princess of Wales, as a "bitter" and "nasty" woman. She also said that Charles, Prince of Wales, was "jealous" of his former wife's popularity and that he had effectively married a "womb". She further claimed that the Prince's Duchy Originals jams were not homemade: "He's got factories. It's just got his name on it." According to Charles, Earl Spencer, Diana in turn considered Marie-Christine her "nightmare neighbour" at Kensington Palace, claiming she had "accosted" Diana after she lost her HRH style post divorce.

After hearing of research by Dorothy Cheney and Robert Seyfarth suggesting that rank among female baboons is hereditary, Marie-Christine reportedly remarked: "I always knew that when people who aren't like us claim that hereditary rank is not part of human nature, they must be wrong. Now you've given me evolutionary proof!"

In 2015, she generated controversy by asserting publicly that animals do not have rights because they do not pay taxes, maintain bank accounts, or participate in elections.

In 2017, she was criticised for wearing a blackamoor brooch depicting a stylised African figure to a Christmas banquet at Buckingham Palace attended by Meghan Markle, then the fiancée of Harry. A spokesperson later said that she "is very sorry and distressed that it has caused offence".

In 2018, British-American writer and journalist Aatish Taseer, formerly her daughter's partner, alleged that Marie-Christine had owned a pair of black sheep named after Venus and Serena Williams.

== Titles, styles, honours and arms ==
=== Titles and styles ===
Royal monogram

Marie-Christine was known as Baroness Marie-Christine von Reibnitz before her marriage to Michael. Since their marriage, she has been styled as Her Royal Highness Princess Michael of Kent.

=== Honours ===
- 6 February 2012: Recipient of the Queen Elizabeth II Diamond Jubilee Medal

=== Foreign honours ===
- (Austria-Hungary) Austrian Imperial and Royal Family: Dame of the Order of the Starry Cross
- Sovereign Military Order of Malta: Knight Grand Cross of Honour and Devotion of the Order of Saint John (September 2010)
- (Kingdom of the Two Sicilies) Two Sicilian Royal Family: Knight Grand Cross of Justice of the Order of Saint George

=== Award ===
- League of Mercy: Companion of the Order of Mercy

=== Other ===
- Honorary Freeman of the Worshipful Company of Gardeners
- Honorary Freeman of the Worshipful Company of Goldsmiths
- Honorary Freeman of the Worshipful Company of Leathersellers
- Honorary Freeman of the Worshipful Company of Weavers
- Fellow of the Linnean Society of London (FLS)

=== Arms ===
Coat of arms of Princess Michael of Kent
Notes Arms of Princess Michael of Kent, depicting her husband's arms impaled with her patrilineal von Reibnitz coat of arms. Coronet Coronet of a Grandchild of the British Sovereign Escutcheon Prince Michael of Kent's arms impaled with her paternal arms, viz: Argent, two bars Gules Supporters The Royal Supporters differenced with a like Coronet and Label.

== Issue ==
Name	Birth	Marriage		Children
Lord Frederick Windsor	6 April 1979	12 September 2009	Sophie Winkleman	Maud Windsor; Isabella Windsor
Lady Gabriella Kingston	23 April 1981	18 May 2019	Thomas Kingston (died 25 February 2024)	None

== Notes ==
Orders of precedence in the United Kingdom
Preceded by The Countess of Snowdon	Ladies; HRH Princess Michael of Kent	Succeeded by Lady Sarah Chatto
