= Avalon Airport =

International airport in Greater Geelong, Victoria, Australia

Avalon Airport Melbourne–Avalon

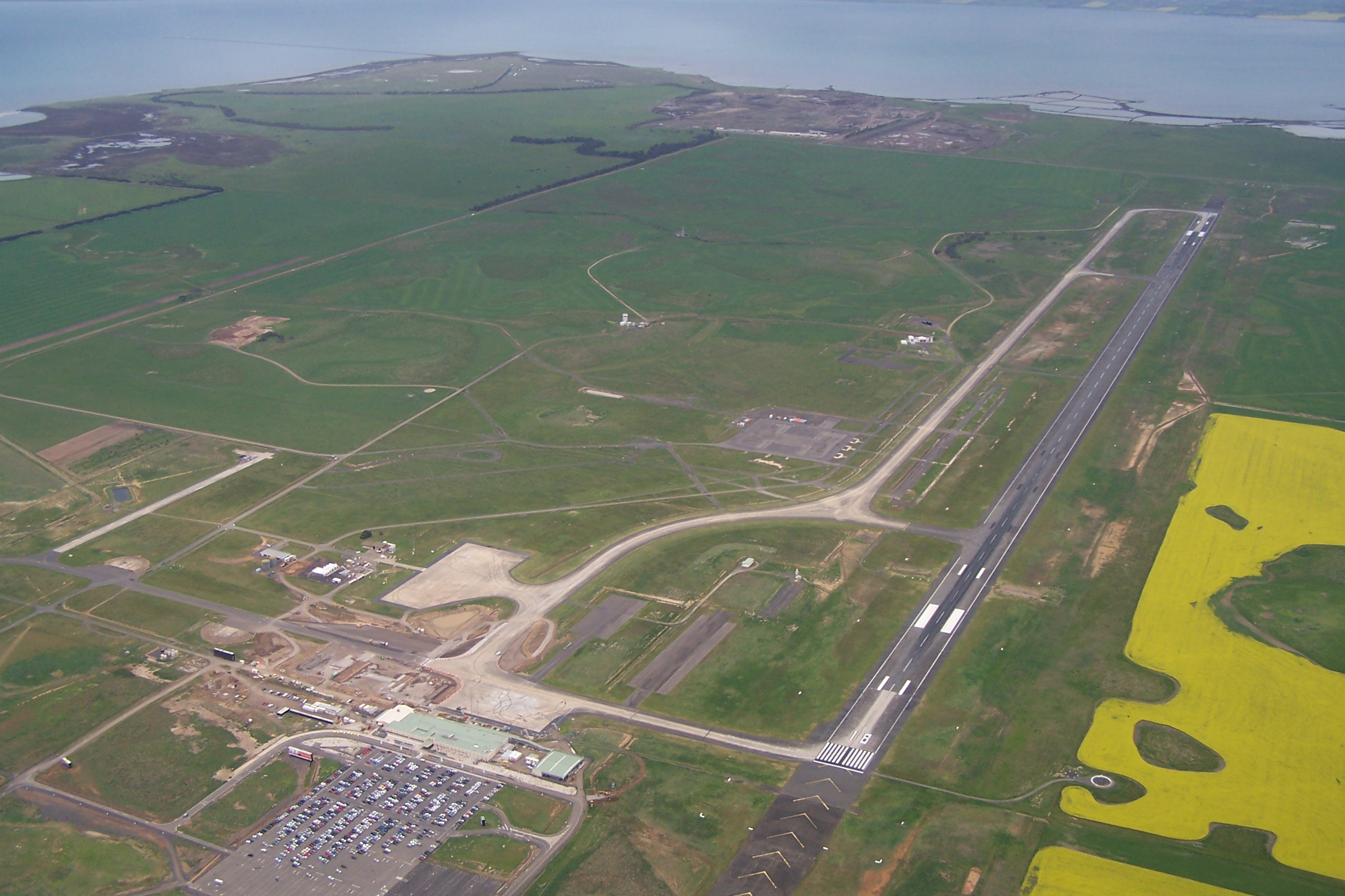
- IATA: AVV; ICAO: YMAV; WMO: 94854

Summary
- Airport type: Public
- Owner: Department of Defence
- Operator: Linfox
- Serves: Melbourne; Geelong
- Location: Avalon, Victoria, Australia
- Opened: 1953; 73 years ago
- Elevation AMSL: 35 ft (11 m)
- Coordinates: 38°02′26″S 144°28′15″E
- Website: Official website
- Interactive map of Avalon Airport

Runways
Direction	Length		Surface
Direction	m	ft	Surface
18/36	3,048	10,000	Asphalt

Statistics (2019)
- Passengers: Estimated 1,350,000
- Sources: Australian AIP and aerodrome chart

Avalon Airport (IATA: AVV, ICAO: YMAV) (currently styled as Avalon Airport Melbourne and previously as Melbourne Avalon Airport) is an international airport, located in Avalon in the City of Greater Geelong in Victoria, Australia. While located outside the Melbourne metropolitan area, it is the second busiest of the four airports serving the state capital in passenger traffic. It is located 15 km (9 mi) north-east of the Geelong CBD and 50 km (31 mi) south-west of the Melbourne CBD. The airport is operated by Avalon Airport Australia Pty Ltd, a subsidiary of Linfox.

Avalon is currently served by passenger airline Jetstar, which began domestic flights in 2004. The airport is also the site of the biennial Australian International Airshow, which has been held at the venue since 1992.

Unlike Melbourne Airport, Avalon Airport is not governed by the Commonwealth's Airports Act 1996. The airport has a single runway in addition to a helipad.

== History ==
The airport is located on land of the original indigenous owners, the Wathaurong people, and a scatter stone area is preserved on the Avalon Airport site, out of respect for the original owners. The land has undergone many changes over the past century.

Initially, the airport was a sheep and cattle farm and homestead, founded by James Austin, an immigrant from Glastonbury, England. Austin established his farm and named the homestead "Avalon" after the isle of Avalon at Glastonbury, the mythical island in the Arthurian legend. In 1952 the Commonwealth Government bought 1,754 ha (4,333 acres) at Avalon for just £110, as the land was deemed to be of poor quality farmland due to the abundance of volcanic rock littering the surface.

The airport was opened in 1953, to cater for the production of military aircraft. Previously, the Government Aircraft Factories at Fishermans Bend, Melbourne had used a runway beside the factory. However, newer jet aircraft required a longer runway for safe operations, and the Fishermans Bend runway was being encroached upon by development.

A 3,048 m (10,000 ft) runway was built by the Country Roads Board, with the first plane landing on 3 April 1953 – a four-engined Avro Lincoln heavy bomber flown from Fishermans Bend. The English Electric Canberra light bomber was under construction at the same time at the new airport. In 1959, Qantas established a training base at the site.

In 1961, Government Aircraft Factories combined with the Commonwealth Aircraft Corporation, and built and serviced 110 Mirage fighters at the site, and in 1970 Jindivik Target Aircraft transferred to Avalon Airport from Fishermans Bend, adding production of 170 Nomad and 75 Hornet military jets, in addition to servicing of other jets.

In 1985, the Government Aircraft Factories changed its name to Aerospace Technologies of Australia (ASTA). Aircraft produced during this time included the GAF Jindivik remotely piloted aircraft, and Nomad civil aircraft. Under the ASTA banner, engines for the Dassault Mirage III jet fighters were produced, as well as assembly of the F/A-18 multirole combat aircraft for the Royal Australian Air Force (RAAF).

In 1990, ASTA acquired 99 year lease on the airport. In 1996, the airport was sold to Foxerco, owned by Linfox and Serco.

In October 1988, the ASTA Aircraft Services division took the first Boeing 747 to Avalon for servicing and maintenance. By December 1993, fifty 747 aircraft had been through the Avalon facility, and 820 people were employed at the site. October 1995 saw a Cathay Pacific Lockheed L-1011 flown to Avalon for scrapping by ASTA Aircraft Services, in what was a one-off event.

Training of pilots from Japan's All Nippon Airways commenced at the airport on 8 September 1993.

On 27 June 1995 Aerospace Technologies of Australia was privatised by the Federal Government, selling the aircraft divisions to Rockwell Australia, and the airport operations to Avalon Airport Geelong Pty Ltd. The ASTA airliner overhauling facility was closed in 1997.

The first scheduled passenger flights out of the airport were operated by Hazelton Airlines, who commenced flights between Avalon Airport and Sydney in February 1995. 36-seat Saab 340 aircraft were used for the service. The service was discontinued after a short time due to a lack of passengers.

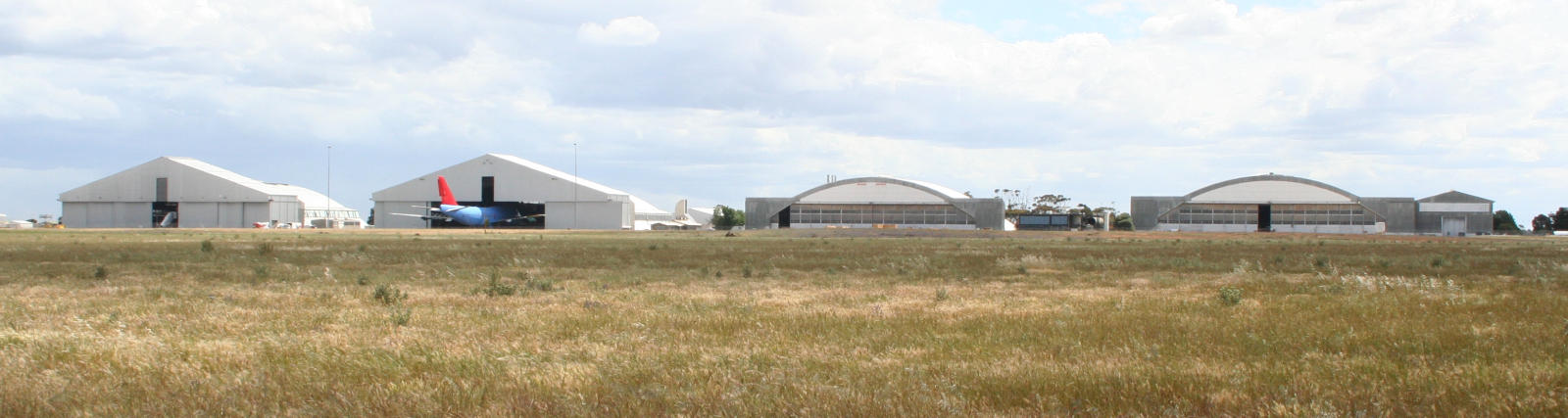
Aircraft hangars at the airport. The tail of VH-EBU Nalanji Dreaming can be seen in the second hangar.

=== Post-privatisation ===
Between 1997 and 2001 Linfox developed proposals to develop the land which formed the basis of the Avalon Airport Master Plan draft, 2013. In 1992, the airport began hosting the Australian International Airshow.

On 1 June 2004, Jetstar started commercial flights from the airport, in addition to their operations at Melbourne Airport. In 2008, the Federal Government rejected an application to build an international terminal.

In April 2010, Tigerair Australia announced it would base two aircraft and commence operations from Avalon later that year. By June 2011 however, Tigerair Australia announced it would be withdrawing several flights from Avalon, to be operated instead from Melbourne Airport. The remaining Tigerair Australia services were withdrawn after a series of incidents that led to airline's operations being suspended by the Civil Aviation Safety Authority the following month.

In October 2012, the Federal Government announced that the airport's lease would be amended, allowing for the construction of a new terminal and the implementation of international flights. Avalon is the second airport in Victoria to be designated as a port of entry for freight operations.

In February 2022, Bonza announced that the airport would become one of its 17 destinations with the airline planning to fly to the Sunshine Coast from Avalon. Bonza started commercial flights from the airport on 21 February 2023, in addition to their operations at Melbourne Airport. Bonza entered voluntary administration and suspended all flights in April 2024.

=== International flights ===
Avalon Airport served international flights between December 2018 and February 2020, until they were terminated due to the COVID-19 pandemic in Australia.

Commencing 5 December 2018, AirAsia X Airbus A330s operated twice daily direct flights to Kuala Lumpur, Malaysia from Avalon, shifting its operations from Melbourne Airport. The services were terminated during COVID, and reinstated out of Melbourne Airport in 2022.

Citilink operated daily Airbus A320neo flights Avalon from to Denpasar (Bali), Indonesia starting 24 January 2020. They were terminated in late February 2020.

A media release on 22 October 2019 from the Victorian Premier's Office stated that VietJet Air was expected to begin flights from Avalon to Vietnam in the second half of 2020. However, when VietJet commenced their flights to Melbourne in April 2023, they operated out of Melbourne Airport instead.

In November 2025, Jetstar announced that they would commence flights to Denpasar (Bali), Indonesia commencing 23 March 2026.

=== Future ===
==== Airport Master Plan 2015 ====
The Avalon Airport Master Plan was prepared by Avalon Airport Pty Ltd in September 2015 and was endorsed by the Department of Defence. The document provides for a significant expansion of the airport's operations, as well as the establishment of non-aviation related developments.

== Facilities ==
Since the introduction of Jetstar in 2004, the Avalon Airport terminal facilities have expanded from the original size of 732 m^{2} (7,880 sq ft) to nearly 5,600 m^{2} (60,000 sq ft). Over $100 million has been invested in the airport thus far to complete the following:

- An apron expansion to accommodate a further four aircraft as well as enable the opportunity to accommodate an aircraft the size of a Boeing 747.
- A total of seven A320 sized aircraft can now be parked simultaneously in front of the airport terminal.
- Installation of a flight information display system
- Fuel farm expansion to triple storage capacity from 500,000 to 1,500,000 L (130,000 to 400,000 US gal) of A1 jet fuel plus installation of new fuel pipelines
- Construction of a new bus, taxi and hire car road and various rerouted roads to manage incoming passenger traffic and other road infrastructure upgrades
- Fuel farm electrical maintenance and demolition of unused buildings
- Significant infrastructure upgrades as part of the Australian International Airshow

=== Passenger terminal ===
The current terminal facility is approximately 4,500 m^{2} (48,000 sq ft) in area and houses four gates capable of servicing aircraft up to and including the size of the Airbus A321. In its present configuration, the terminal can accommodate around six domestic departures per hour. The airport has a total of eight aircraft parking bays; there are six on the Northern Apron and two on the Eastern Apron. On the Northern Apron, the airport can accommodate five Code C Aircraft (Boeing 737 or Airbus A320 aircraft) and one Boeing 747.

Avalon Airport can accommodate two Boeing 747s or two Boeing 787s on the Eastern Apron. The Eastern Apron is also a remote parking bay which doubles as a freight bay. The airport is capable of fitting one Airbus A380 at a time on the Eastern Apron; this means it can also accommodate the freighter version of the Boeing 747-8, which is slightly smaller.

Currently the airport terminal is not equipped with aerobridges, and does not feature any guest lounges.

=== Freight facilities ===
The most notable freight operations include the Australian Grand Prix, Supercars and Superbikes, plus some specialist charters including livestock race horses, fresh produce, military hardware and touring rock bands. The airport can facilitate loads on all aircraft types from the Airbus 380 series down, with equipment available to load via the main deck, lower deck, nose or tail end of the aircraft, with a maximum lift of 16 t (18 short tons). It has three dedicated freighter parking positions: Two on its eastern and one on the northern freighter aprons.

=== Aircraft heavy maintenance ===
Avalon Airport has six hangars in total: 55,000 m^{2} (590,000 sq ft) of hangar space, including three customised ex-Qantas Boeing 747 hangars. The Qantas Engineering maintenance facility operated at the airport from May 1998 until its closure in March 2014.

It was also responsible for the Qantas's aircraft commercial project work, including cabin reconfigurations and refurbishment.

== Airlines and destinations ==
=== Passenger ===
Airlines	Destinations
Jetstar	Adelaide, Brisbane, Denpasar, Gold Coast, Sydney–Kingsford Smith

=== Cargo ===
Airlines	Destinations
Saudia Cargo	Riyadh

== Other uses ==
The video clip of Human Nature's 2000 song He Don't Love You was filmed at the airport.

In July 2013, it was proposed by Geelong City Council that a theme park be built at Avalon, and they have held discussions with Village Roadshow and other companies concerning the proposal. African Safari World was a previous proposal at nearby Werribee Zoo that did not get approved.

The biennial Australian International Airshow operates from Avalon Airport. The project is owned by Aviation Development Australia Limited. The event attracts a total attendance of over 195,000 across the six days, including exhibitors from the international aerospace industry and government, military, scientific and trade delegates.

== Ground transport ==
=== Road ===
Avalon Airport is linked to Geelong and Melbourne by the adjacent Princes Freeway. The airport has 1,500 airport car spaces, a taxi rank and a ride-share pick-up/drop-off bay.

=== Public transport ===
==== Bus ====
Skybus operates direct services to Southern Cross station in Melbourne, with an intermediate stop in Werribee. Prior to Skybus commencing operations in 2017, the service was operated by Sita Buslines.

Public bus services are operated to Avalon by CDC Geelong on behalf of Transport Victoria. Route 18 runs between the airport and Lara station, providing a connection with V/Line trains to Geelong and Southern Cross via Sunshine. This service commenced on 15 March 2026.

==== Future rail connection ====
In May 2011, the Victorian Minister for Public Transport committed $3 million for the planning of a rail link to Avalon Airport. In January 2013, three route options were presented. The railway line would start by running along the existing Warrnambool railway line, and then divert towards Avalon Airport, south of Little River, at one of three locations. The eastern option would see the line break away closer to Melbourne, near Cherry Swamp Road and Little River. The central option would place the diversion 2.5 km (1.6 mi) southwest, near Peak School Road at Lara. The western route option would divert from the existing line closer to Geelong, at Plains Road, Lara. Each of the three routes would run over the Princes Freeway, north east of the Beach Road interchange at Little River, running under the flight path to a new station inside the terminal. The government would need to acquire private farmland to complete the link and is considering a number different options, including a light rail service or an automated driverless trains as used at several international airports.

In August 2013, the state government indicated that it may alter its election promise to build the $250 million railway line to Avalon Airport, and instead create a cheaper light rail link from Melbourne's south-west. Department documents show the government is now considering other options to meet interim demand, such as light rail, buses, or "driverless transport options which are used at many airports around the world".

In September 2023, Avalon Airport called for an alternate plan which would see an infill airport station built along the existing Geelong line, with a new road for shuttle buses to connect it directly with the airport. The plan was costed at $140 million with Avalon Airport CEO Tony Brun proposing to split the cost three ways between the airport, the state and federal governments.

In May 2024, due to delays with the construction of the Melbourne Airport Rail link, State Treasurer Tim Pallas suggested that Avalon Airport could receive funding for a new rail link instead if Melbourne Airport is unable to agree on its station design.

== Accidents and incidents ==
- On 6 August 1976, a prototype N24 Nomad crashed shortly after takeoff at Avalon while conducting a flight test of modifications to the tail of the aircraft. Two of the three crew members were killed in the accident, notably including pilot Stuart Pearce, father of actor Guy Pearce.
- On 30 June 2011, a Tiger Airways Australia Airbus A320 flight from Sydney performed a missed approach at Avalon outside of published procedures, resulting in the aircraft overflying the Geelong suburb of Leopold at a dangerously low altitude, without guidance from Air Traffic Control. The incident made national headlines and triggered a five-week grounding of the airline over a busy school holiday period while a safety audit was conducted by the Civil Aviation Safety Authority.
- On 6 March 2025, a 17-year-old male armed with a loaded shotgun was overpowered by passengers and crew before being arrested after he breached the airport security fence and tried to board a Jetstar plane. The teenager threatened passengers and crew and allegedly told passengers he was carrying a bomb. The incident led to a lockdown of the airport with the airport remaining closed until the following day. The incident led to concerns about security at the airport that, unlike the majority of airports in major Australian cities, is guarded by private security officers as opposed to dedicated border officials and federal police. As a result of the security breach, the Home Affairs Department, Victoria Police’s counterterrorism command and the Cyber and Infrastructure Security Centre have all launched investigations into security and safety at the airport.
- On 28 March 2025, a Wolf Pitts S1-11X biplane crashed during an aerobatic display at the Avalon Australian International Airshow, when it lost control after completing a loop, critically injuring the pilot, who was the sole occupant.
