= WORZ =

WORZ may refer to:

- Werribee Open Range Zoo
- WORZ-LP, a defunct low-power radio station (107.9 FM) formerly licensed to Key Largo, Florida, United States
- WYGM, formerly WORZ in Orlando
