= Skip Stewart =

American aerobatic pilot

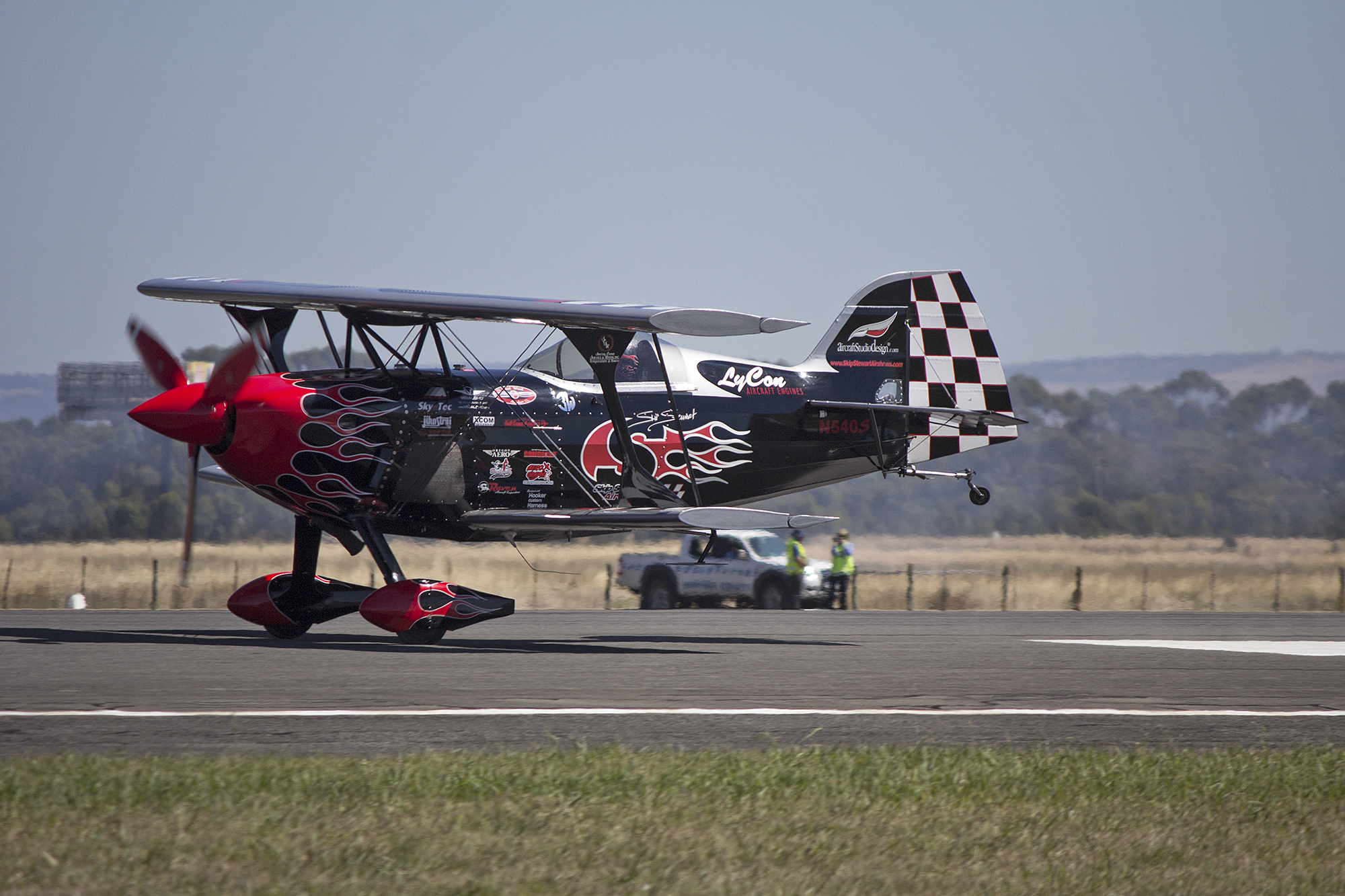
Stewart landing his Pitts S-2S Special at the 2013 Avalon Airshow.

William Lewis "Skip" Stewart (born February 9, 1968), better known as Skip Stewart, is an aerobatic and commercial pilot from the United States who flies in airshows.

Stewart was a member of the X-Team and flew Codename Mary’s Lamb with Jim LeRoy. He was flying with him the day Leroy crashed his aircraft and died. The next day Stewart flew his Pitts biplane in a salute to Leroy.
