= Australian International Airshow =

Air show in Australia

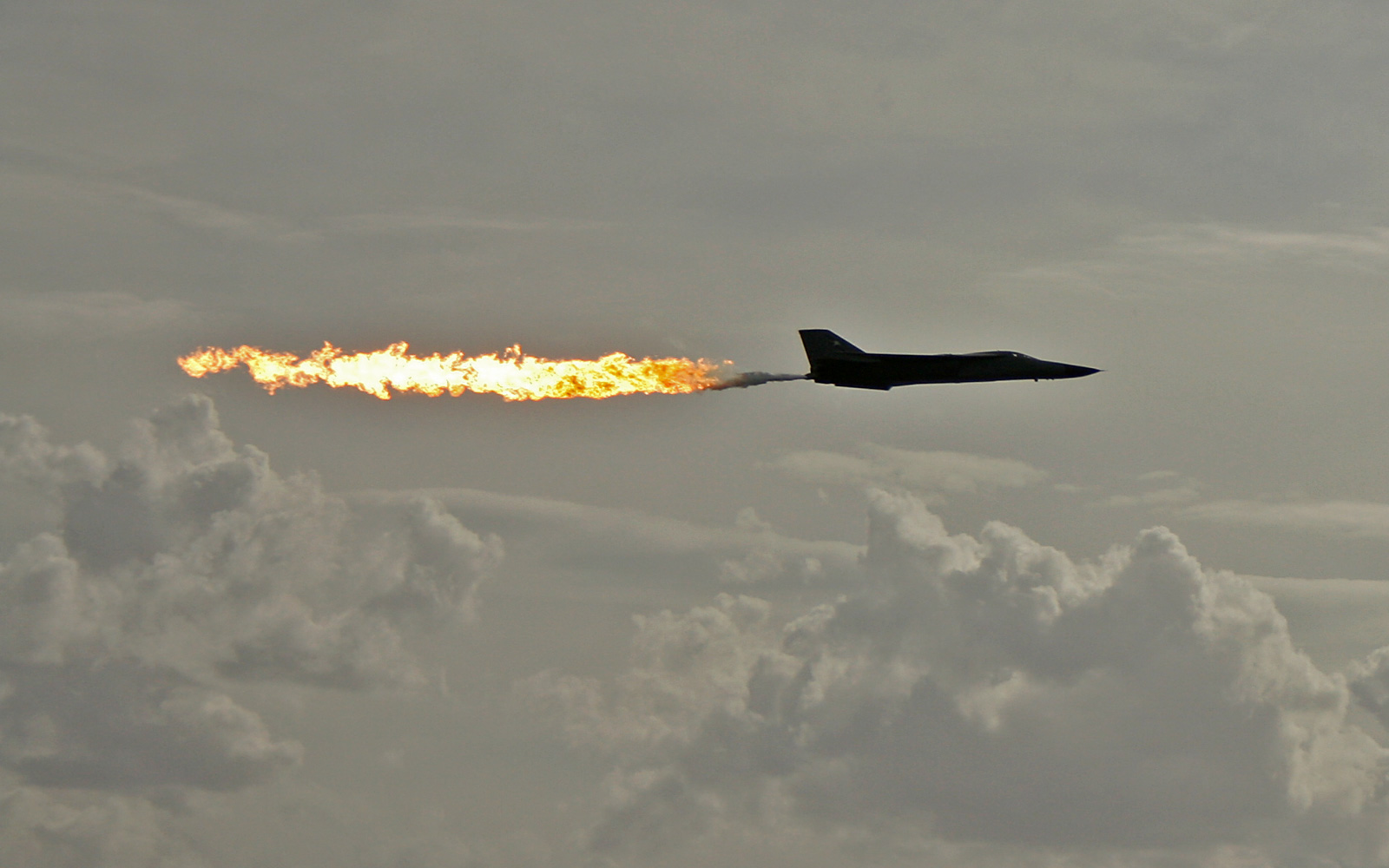
- RAAF F-111 at the 2007 Airshow performing a dump-and-burn, wherein fuel is intentionally ignited with the jet's afterburner
- Genre: Air show
- Dates: March
- Frequency: Biennial: Odd years
- Venue: Avalon Airport
- Location: Victoria
- Coordinates: 38.0342°S 144.4683°E
- Country: Australia
- Established: 1988; 38 years ago
- Most recent: 2025
- Next event: 2027
- Major events: Aerobatic and static displays
- Website: https://www.airshow.com.au

The Australian International Airshow, also called the Avalon Airshow, is a large air show held biennially at Avalon Airport, between Melbourne and Geelong in Victoria.

The event has a strong focus on military aviation, featuring aircraft from the Royal Australian Air Force, United States Navy and the United States Air Force. Representatives from other air arms have also appeared at the airshow on many occasions, including aircraft from the Royal Air Force, Japan Air Self-Defense Force, Republic of Singapore Air Force and many others.

It has been said by air show organisers to be the largest air show in the Southern Hemisphere.

The airshow has periodically attracted anti-war protests.

== History ==
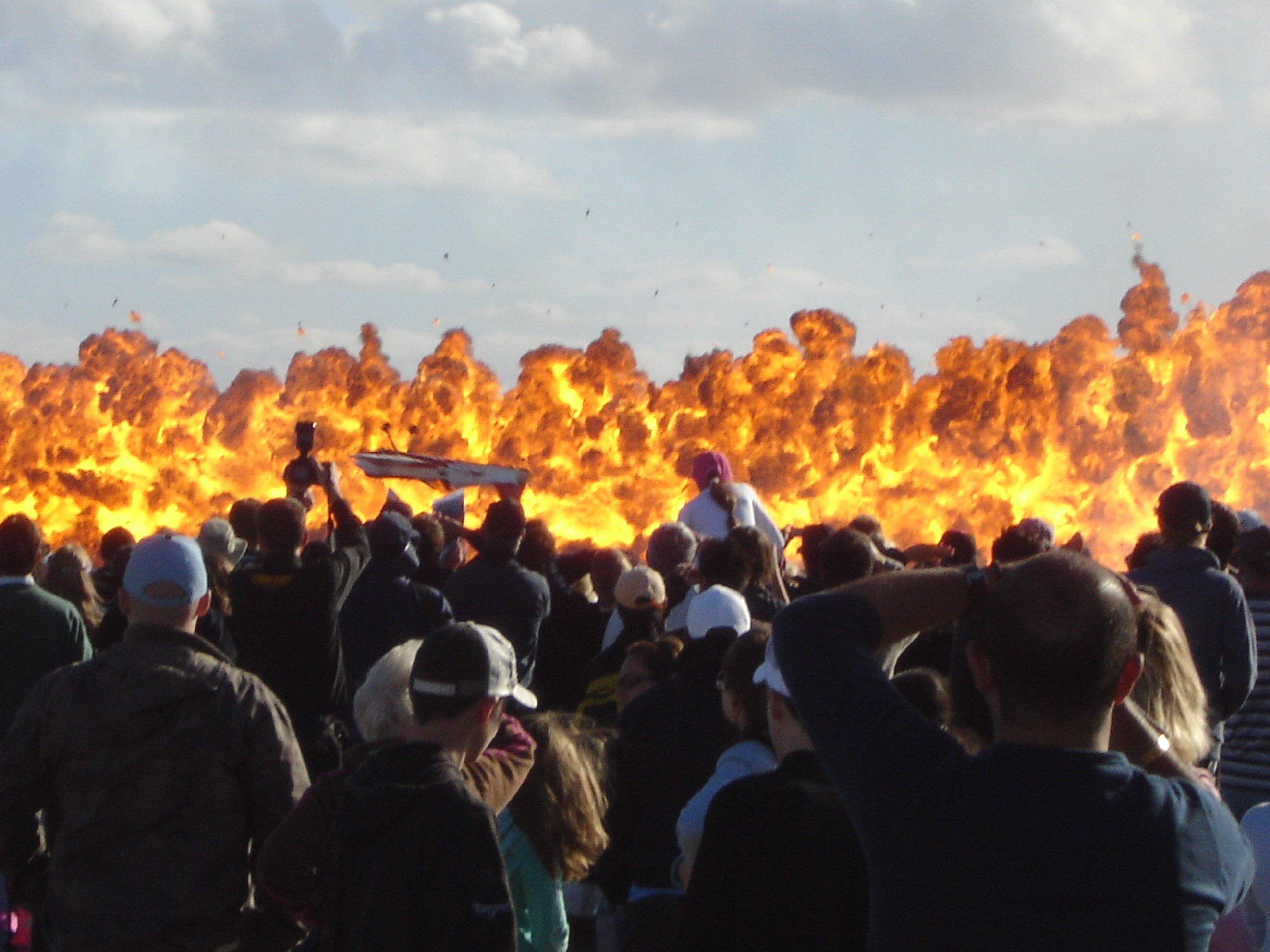
An inverted plane leaving a wall-of-fire in 2007

In 1957, the first air display was held at Avalon, when the head of the Port Melbourne Government Aircraft Factories, Geoff J. Churcher OAM, put on a display for the employees. As the employees at the factory only ever saw individual parts of aircraft, it was decided to mount a flying display at Avalon so the employees could see the final result of their work.

=== 1988–1991: the first air shows ===
In 1988, to celebrate the Australian Bicentenary, the first major airshow in Australia was held in Sydney at the Royal Australian Air Force (RAAF) air base at Richmond in New South Wales. It was organised by members of the Schofields Flying Club, which had been running small-scale air shows at the small strip at Schofields Airfield. The Bicentennial Airshow featured a vast array of international military aircraft, including the F-15 Eagle, Panavia Tornado F3, Sea Harrier, the Royal New Zealand Air Force aerobatic team "Kiwi Red", Lockheed C-5 Galaxy, BAE Systems Hawk and a flypast by a Boeing B-52 Stratofortress bomber.

In February 1991, a second air show was held at Richmond, to celebrate the RAAF's 70th Anniversary. It was the last air show run by the remnants of Schoe's, who provided the prime impetus to get the Aerospace Foundation of Australia up and running. The foundation was responsible for forming AirShows DownUnder.

With the success of those two New South Wales shows, plans were laid for the Avalon airshow.

=== 1st edition (1992) – Moving to Avalon ===
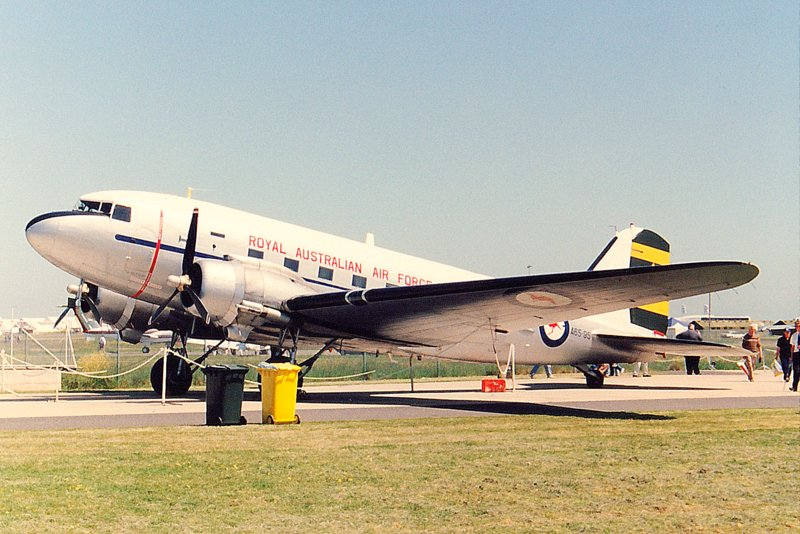
A C-47 Dakota A65-95 of the ARDU, 1992

In 1992, the Australian International Airshow was moved to Avalon Airport near Geelong. Held during October, the show coincided with the wettest spring in Victoria's history. The show organisers nearly cancelled it due to the wet, but the rain stopped just before the opening day. The two public days of the 1992 show were attended by about 175,000 people.

There were 226 exhibitors from 12 countries. The move to Avalon in 1992 was hoped to be the first of many locations, however the weather caused financial difficulties that resulted in the air show remaining at Avalon for many years.

Besides the weather, further problems presented themselves, including the absence of the MiG-29 and Sukhoi Su-27 promised by the Russians. Other aircraft were present, notably the enormous Antonov An-124 Ruslan and Ilyushin Il-86. On display were warbirds, and the Airbus A340, which had been in commercial service for only seven months. The show featured significant RAAF participation.

=== 2nd edition (1995) ===
The 1995 show was the second to take place at Avalon. The date was moved from October to 21–26 March, taking advantage of finer weather during autumn.

The show was largely stolen by the visiting Russian contingent of Anatoly Kvochur, his specially modified Su-27P "Flanker" and Ilyushin Il-78 "Midas" tanker aircraft. They were supported by other Soviet/Russian aircraft such as the Ilyushin Il-76DMP, Il-96M and the Tupolev Tu-204. Present were the RAAF's General Dynamics F-111G "Aardvark", and the BAE Systems Hawk, Dassault Alpha Jet, CASA/IPTN CN-235, and the Kaman Seasprite, which were running for Australian Defence Force orders.

Aerial in-flight refuelling was displayed as well as Kvochur's world-famous flying routine with the Flanker which involved the "Cobra", knife-edge and extremely low level passes. The final display on the Sunday show saw the Flanker cruise down the Avalon runway at approximately 15 feet (4.6 m) above ground level. The RAAF and USAF were reluctant to compete with the Flanker and so there was no solo F/A-18 Hornet aerobatic display. The USAF flew the General Dynamics F-16 Fighting Falcon with external drop tanks fitted, which they said limited the aircraft to a "3g max" display. Kvochur won the award for best flying display this year.

=== 3rd edition (1997) ===
The 1997 Avalon air show was held between 18 and 23 February. In contrast to the 1992 show, which was the wettest spring in Victorian history, 1997 took place during the hottest February ever. Attendance was 171,168. $63 million was contributed to the Victorian economy.

Aircraft present were the USAF F-16 Fighting Falcon, KC-135 Stratotanker and C-17 Globemaster III, a Canadian CP-140 Aurora, a United States Marine Corps Super Cobra, a special Airbus A320 in Sydney Olympics livery, and two Canadair CL-215 Scoopers. The most notable aircraft was a Super Constellation, restored by HARS in the US. Another display was by the F-111 with its "dump and burn" during the Night Alight on Friday evening.

=== 4th edition (1999) ===
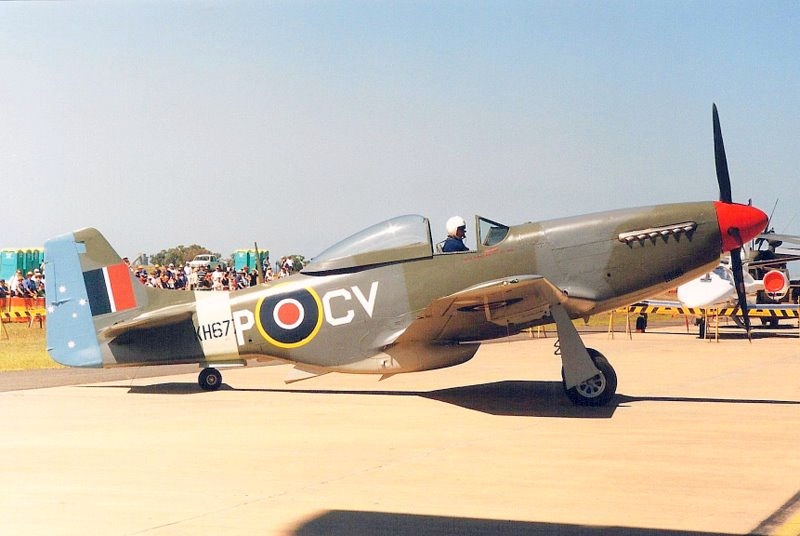
A Commonwealth Aircraft Corporation CA-18 Mustang (VH-JUC) in No. 3 Squadron RAAF colours, 1999

In 1999, there were 472 exhibitors from 26 countries. It was opened by Victorian Premier Jeff Kennett on 16 February 1999. The USAF again had a heavy presence, contributing two F-16Cs, a KC-135R tanker, a C-5 Galaxy, and a B-52. The B-52 was parked at the end of the runway, ready to take off at a moment's notice for deployment in Iraq.

The RAAF displayed its new Lockheed Martin C-130J-30 Super Hercules, even though it was yet to enter service. Eurofighter sent a mock-up of its Typhoon, promoting the aircraft as prospective replacement for the RAAF's F/A-18 Hornet. Business jets, warbirds and historic aircraft were featured heavily, including five North American P-51 Mustangs.

Novelty acts included wing-walking as part of the performances under the name "Stars of Oshkosh". Bob Hoover returned to perform in his Aero Commander.

=== 5th edition (2001) ===
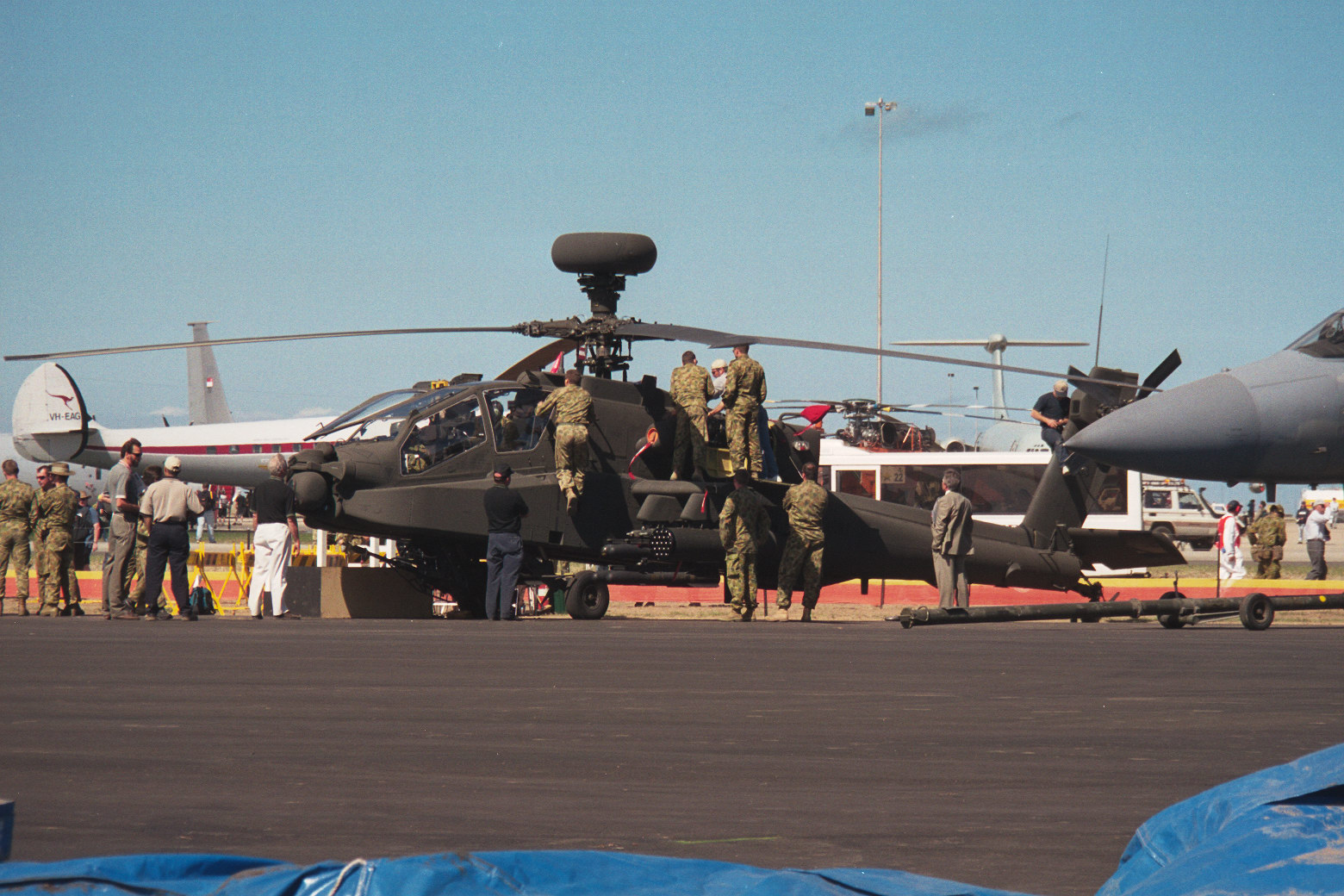
An AH-64 Apache of the US Army, 2001

It was held on 13–18 February 2001, which celebrated Australia's 100 years of federation and 80 years of the Royal Australian Air Force. About 100 United States Air Force pilots took part in the 2001 air show. Planes included a B-1 Lancer, two F-15 Eagles, two F-16 Fighting Falcons, a B-52 Stratofortress, a C-17 Globemaster III, a Hawker Siddeley Nimrod, two Tornado GR.1s, a Vickers VC10 tanker, two RAF Hercules, and a Eurocopter Tiger, among others. The Bombardier CRJ700, Dash-8 (Q400) and Learjet 45 made their AIA debut, accompanied by a Cessna CJ2, Dassault Falcon 900EX and Cirrus SR20.

The 2001 show featured the last public display of the RAAF's Aermacchi MB-326 jet trainer before retirement.

=== 6th edition (2003) ===
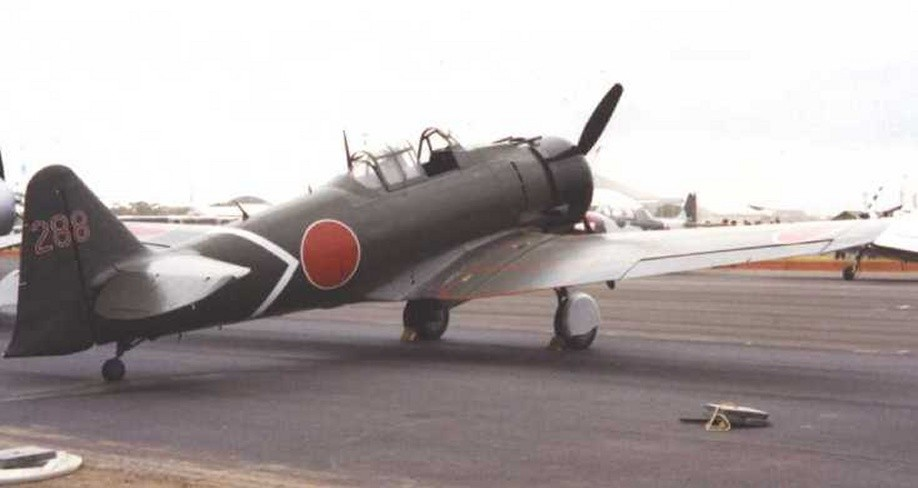
A Mitsubishi Zero replica, 2003

In 2003, the official theme was "Celebrating the Centenary of Powered Flight", commemorating the first powered flight by the Wright brothers on 17 December 1903 at Kitty Hawk, North Carolina. There were 440 exhibitors from 30 countries. There were more than six hundred aircraft on the field. It included replicas from the early 20th century, such as a 1910 Hanriot replica and 1911 Curtiss Model D Pusher replica. There were Tiger Moths, Sopwith Pup, Bleriot XI and a scale version of a Wright Flyer II and other similar aircraft. For jets it had a Canberra, MiG-15, Hawker Hunter, Gloster Meteor and Vampire. A NH90 arrived in an Airbus Beluga, which was an attraction in itself.

A Chinese military delegation was given a tour of the air show. The 2003 show took place in the lead-up to the Iraq War which began the following month and appearances by a number of American aircraft scheduled to join in the show such as the Lockheed F-117 Nighthawk were cancelled, due to possible anti-war protests. There was a model of an F-35 Lightning II, made of wood and fibreglass. An anti-war protest took place outside, and Gavan O'Connor, the local parliament member boycotted the airshow.

=== 7th edition (2005) ===
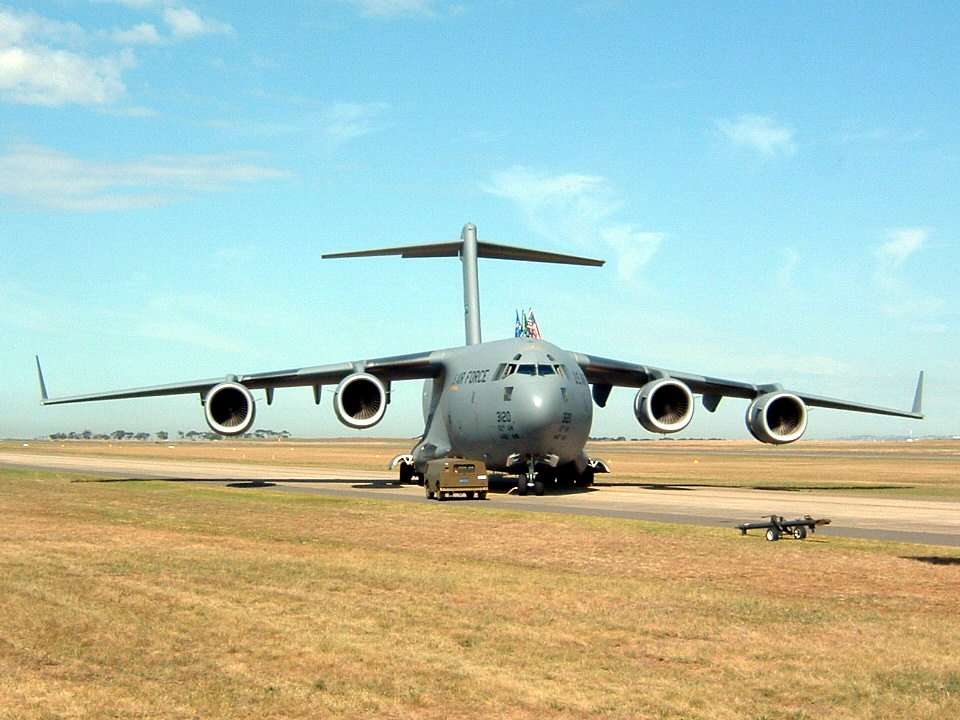
A C-17 Globemaster III of the US Air Force, 2005

The theme of the 2005 show, held from 15 to 20 March, was "The Shape of Things to Come". The airshow experienced increased business activity, with more than 500 exhibitors from 22 countries and 11 major conferences. The air show increased Geelong's economy by $15.6 million.

It featured many planes ranging from ultralights to large military aircraft, such as the F/A-18 Hornet, F-15 Eagle, B-52 Stratofortress (a surprise flyover), F-15 Eagle, F-16 Fighting Falcon, General Dynamics F-111 Aardvark, P-51 Mustang, C-130J, Seahawk, Caribou, Orion and CAC Boomerang. A specially painted RAAF F/A-18 Hornet was present was the show, commemorating 20 years of service with Australia

=== 8th edition (2007) ===
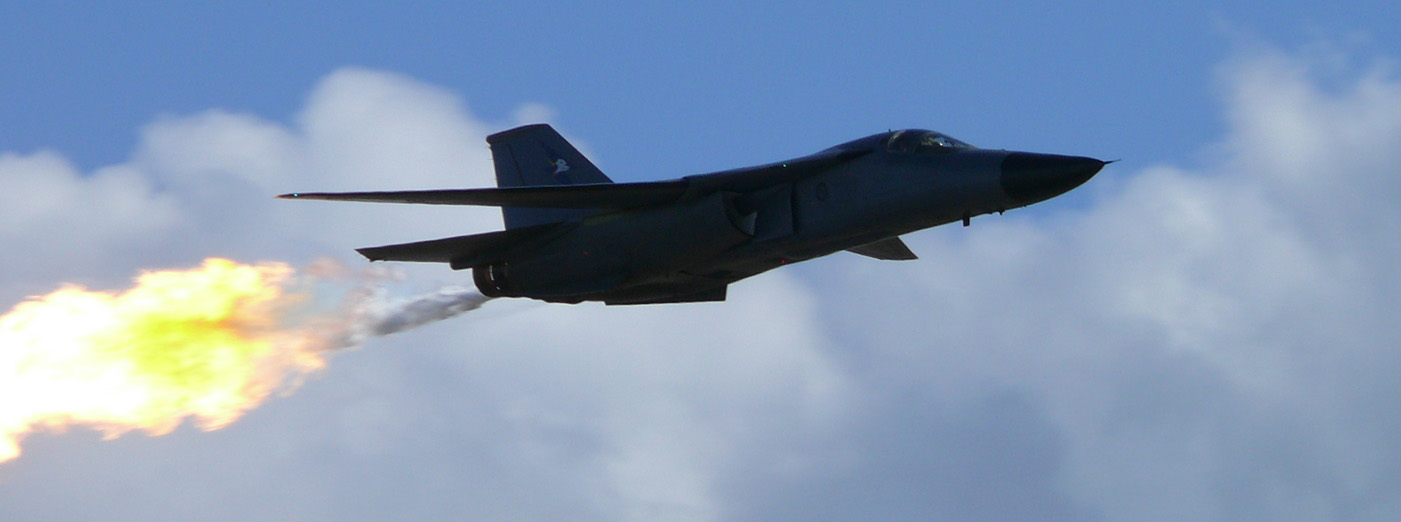
A F-111 of the RAAF performs a "dump and burn", 2007

The theme of the 2007 air show, held between 20 and 25 March, was "Breaking the Barriers", as it was the 60th anniversary of the breaking of the sound barrier by Charles "Chuck" Yeager. Yeager was the guest of honour at the show, and a full-scale mockup of the Bell X-1 was specially constructed. During the show, 611 companies from 20 countries exhibited their products. There were 457 featured aircraft, and 182,769 visitors attended. The 2007 show injected A$120 million into the Victorian economy, creating 1,800 jobs.

It was the 60th year of the United States Air Force, which once again featured prominently at the event, sending the F-15 Eagles, F-16 Fighting Falcons, E-3 Sentry and a C-17 Globemaster III. The F/A-18F Super Hornet display was made possible by United States Navy aircraft from VFA-102 off of the USS Kitty Hawk. Besides those from the USAF, other military aircraft featured included the F/A-18 Hornet, General Dynamics F-111, F/A-18F Super Hornet, BAe Hawk 127, C-27J Spartan and C-130 Hercules, along with military helicopters including the S-70 Black Hawk and Eurocopter Tiger.

The RAAF's first C-17 Globemaster III transport was on display and there was a USAF B-52 bomber flyover. The Roulettes, the RAAF's aerobatic display team, took part in their Pilatus PC-9 aircraft. A large number of civil aircraft were on display, which included modern-day light and sports aircraft, and jet airliners including the Airbus A320, Boeing 737 and Boeing 747. A large number of warbirds and older aircraft took part, such as the P-51 Mustang, P-40 Kittyhawk, Douglas DC-3 and Lockheed Super Constellation.

The show saw the appearance of three-time world aerobatic champion Yurgis Kairis, test pilot Ricardo Traven, who piloted the F/A-18, and American stunt pilot Jim LeRoy. Jim died on 28 July 2007 during a helicopter transit, following a crash at the Vectren Dayton Air Show. Bob Carlton made his debut appearance in the Super Salto Jet Sailplane.

=== 9th edition (2009) ===
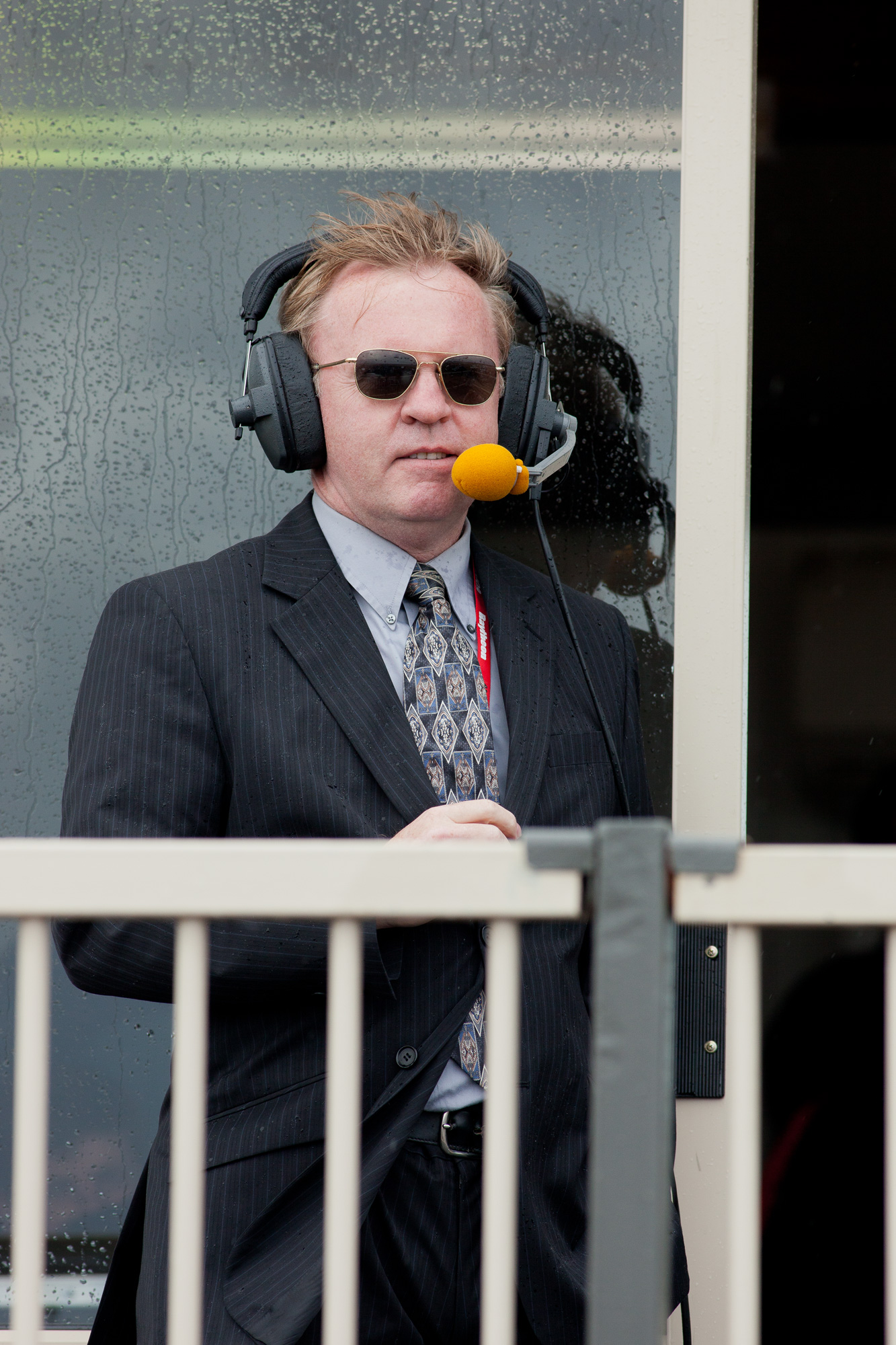
Andy Thomas, 2009

The 2009 air show was held from 10 to 15 March. Trade sessions ran from Tuesday until 2 pm Friday, after which it was opened for the public until Sunday. The theme of this edition was "Towards Tomorrow". Andy Thomas, an Australian-born astronaut, was the guest of honour. The airshow also remembered the 40th anniversary of the first Moon landing. Andy grew up in Adelaide, while the American space programme was still in its infancy. The show was the last featuring the F-111 Aardvark, with the RAAF retiring the aircraft in December 2010, replaced by the F/A-18E/F Super Hornet. Approximately 165,000 people turned out to the six-day-long event.

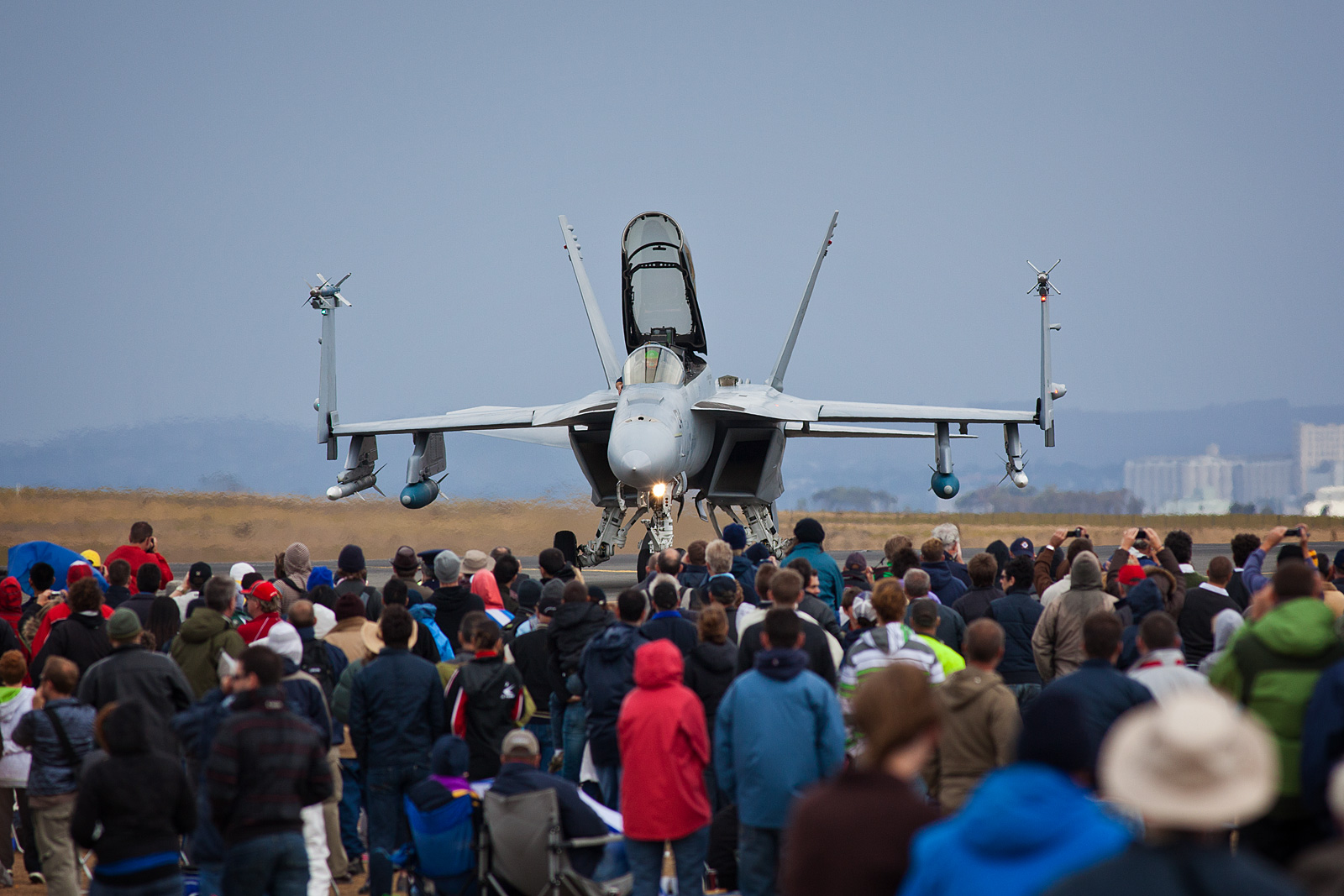
US Navy F/A-18 Super Hornet of VFA-122, 2009

Aircraft that visited the show were Qantas' Boeing 747 and Airbus A380, the latter of which was first delivered the previous year. V Australia, a new Brisbane-based competitor in the international market, contributed with its Boeing 777-300ER. Also on display were the Lockheed C-5 Galaxy, C-17, B1-B Lancer, F-16 Fighting Falcon, F/A-18 Hornet, F/A-18F Super Hornet, F-111 Aardvark, and the KC-10 Extender.

The wall of fire display was not present this year, out of respect to the many people affected by the Victorian bushfires. The show donated $250,000 to fund research into aviation technology aimed at bushfire management. Much of the Sunday show was cancelled due to severe weather, with several tents and temporary structures blown away by strong winds and extensive damage to some visiting aircraft. In total, 562 aircraft part took in the show, with an attendance of 170,045 during the entire show. Ticket sales were the same as 2007 despite the windy and rainy weather.

The 2009 show boosted the Victorian economy by $121 million. In 2010, officials announced that the Australian International Airshow would remain at Avalon until 2015.

=== 10th edition (2011) ===
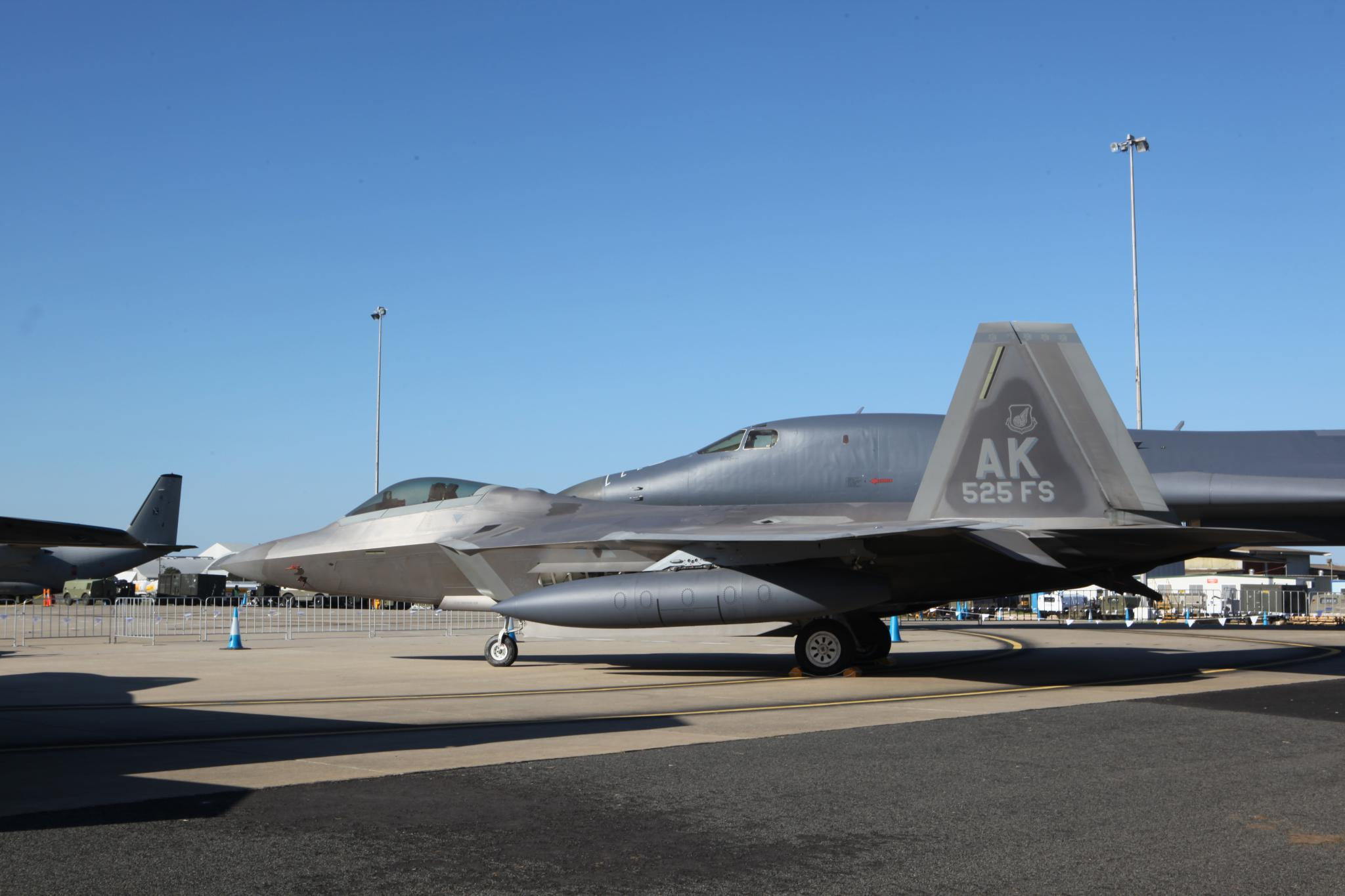
A F-22 Raptor of the USAF on static display, 2011. A B-1B Lancer is in the background

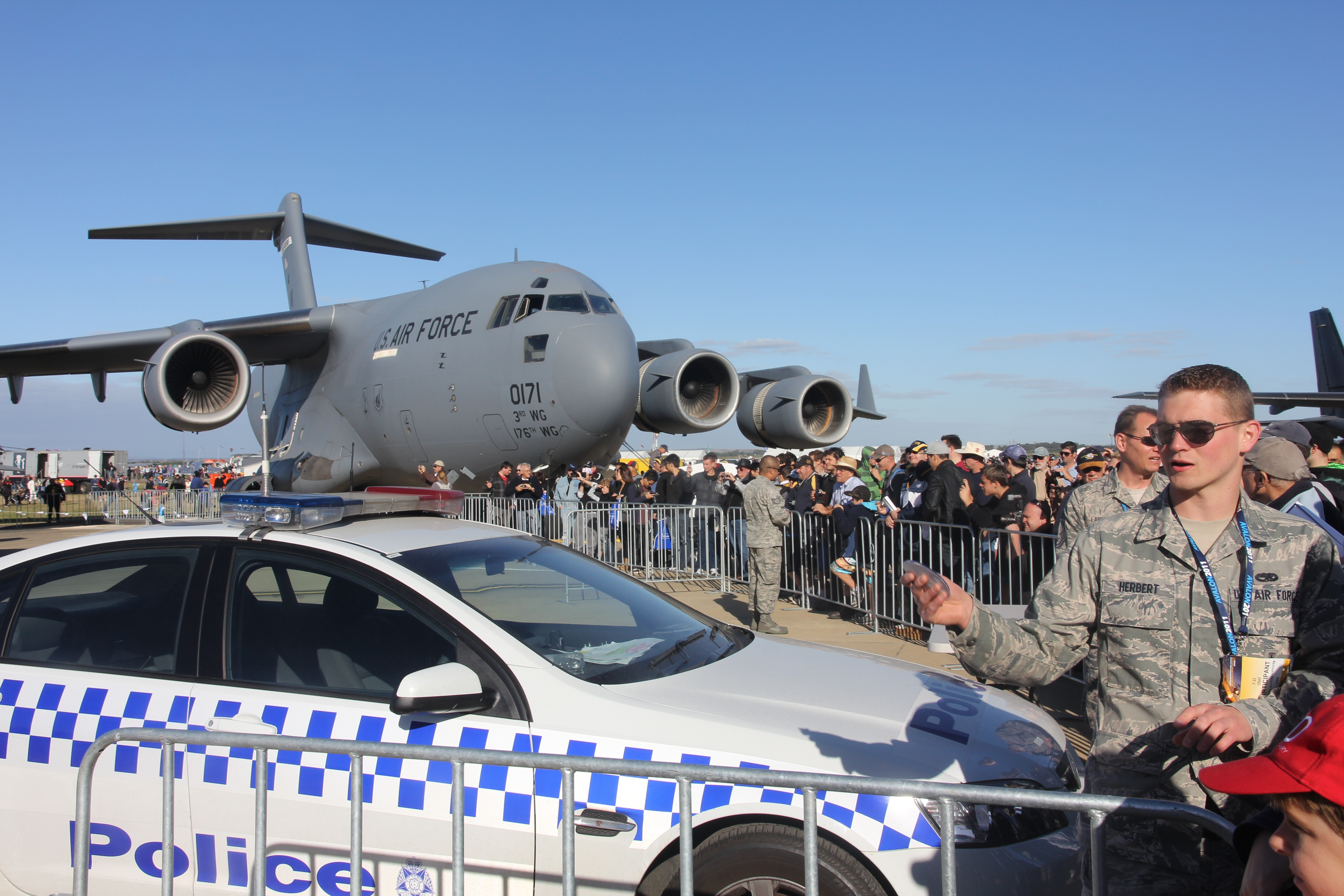
C-17 Globemaster III of the US Air Force, 2011.

The 2011 Australian International Airshow was the tenth to take place at Avalon. It celebrated the 90th anniversary of the Royal Australian Air Force and the centenary of the first passenger flight in Australia. The show ran from 1 to 6 March and opened to the public on Friday, Saturday and Sunday. The "Friday Night Alight" show featured, for the first time, a laser show and flare drops, during which military jets and gliders performed aerobatic displays. More than 195,000 attended the event.

There were about 100 aircraft, including bombers, fighters and surveillance aircraft present at this edition. The show saw the premiere of the most advanced stealth air superiority fighter, the Lockheed Martin F-22 Raptor. Two aircraft, based at Elmendorf Air Force Base, were on static display for the first time in Australia, . They did not perform, because the qualified display pilot was not present. A highly detailed model of the under development Lockheed Martin F-35 Lightning II Joint Strike Fighter was on static display beside a classic F/A-18 Hornet.

Present were a B-1B Lancer, KC-135, KC-10, F-16 Fighting Falcon, C-17 Globemaster III, MH-60R Sea Hawk, B-52 bomber, the RAAF's C130H and J Hercules, F/A-18 Classic Hornet and Super Hornets and Boeing 737 AEW&C "Wedgetail", a Royal Air Force's E-3 Sentry, as well as aircraft and flying performances from New Zealand, France, Italy and Singapore.

The RAAF Roulettes were present, with flying displays towards the end of the show. Helicopters were present from the Australian Army and Royal Australian Navy, including the new MRH-90, along with legacy Blackhawks, Sea King and Squirrel models. A Northrop Grumman B-2 Spirit stealth bomber was scheduled to participate, but was not present. A restored Lockheed Constellation was present. A large contingency of executive jets were on display, most notably the $54 million Bombardier Global Express XRS.

=== 11th edition (2013) ===
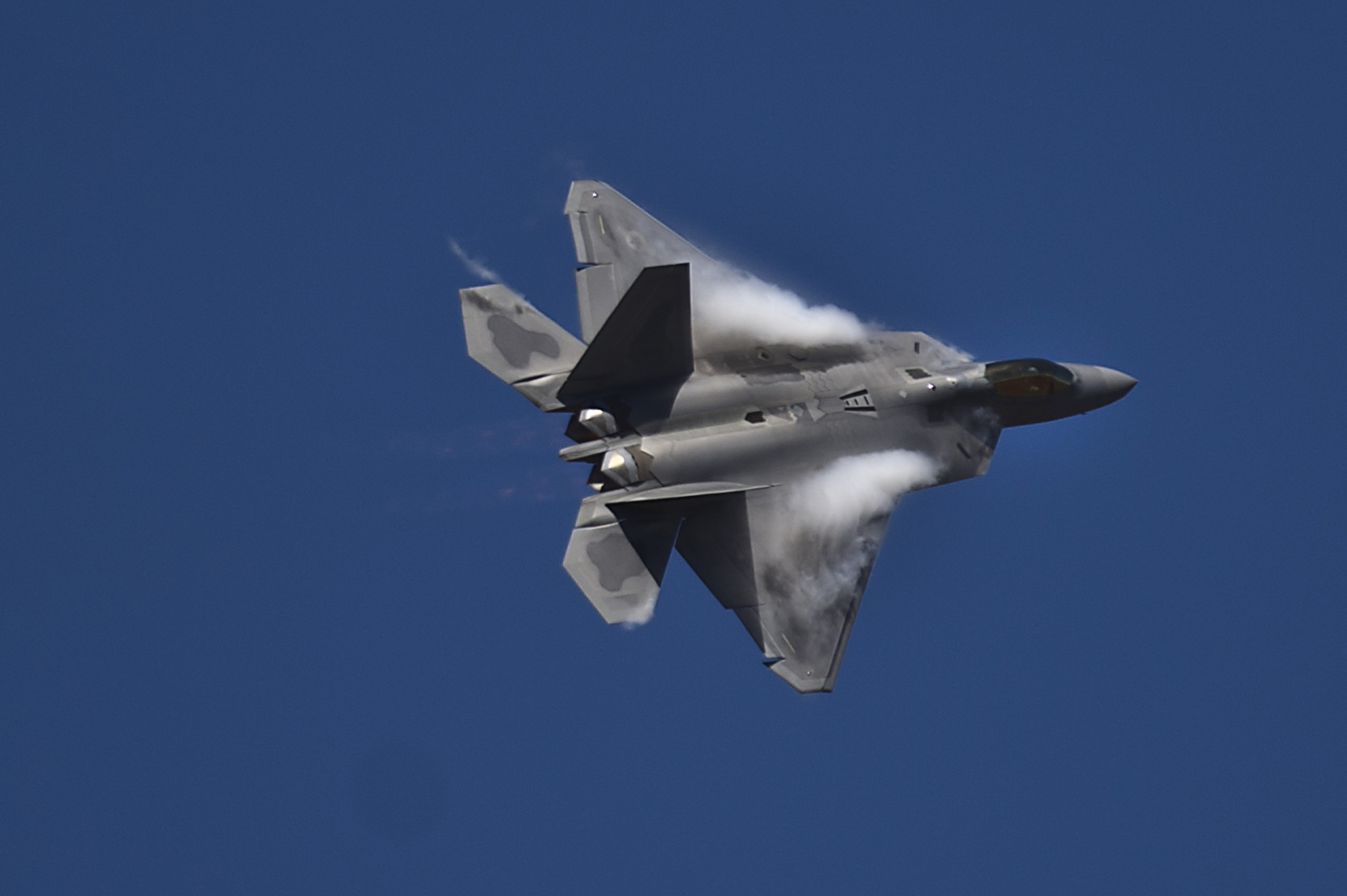
A Lockheed Martin F-22A Raptor, 2013

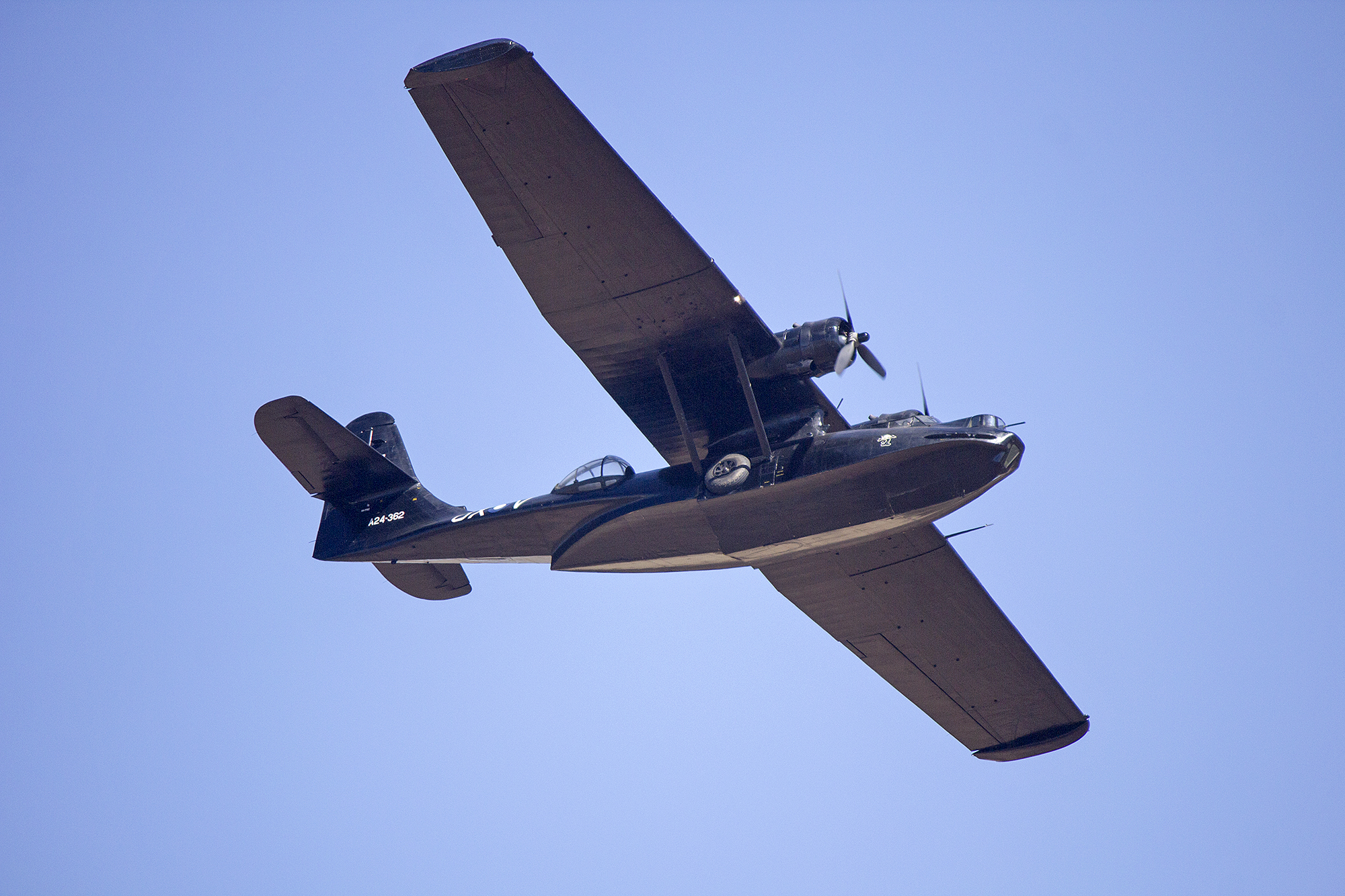
HARS (VH-PBZ) Consolidated PBY Catalina, in RAAF A24-362 livery, doing a flying display at the 2013 Avalon Airshow

A major highlight of the 2013 Australian International Airshow at Avalon was the flying display by a United States Air Force Lockheed Martin F-22A Raptor. Almost 168,000 people attended the six-day event, held between 26 February and 3 March. The first three days were taken up with the trade show and the public spectacle began with the 'Friday Night Alight' show on the Friday evening. More than 600 aircraft participated in Avalon 2013, either directly or indirectly.

Two F-22A Raptors from the 94th 'Hat in the Ring' Fighter Squadron arrived at Avalon direct from Japan, where they had been forward-deployed. The flying display, performed by the Air Combat Command Raptor Demonstration Team's Major Henry 'Schadow' Schantz, was the only display for 2013, due to the effects of sequestration on the US Air Force budget. Other US military aircraft attending Avalon 2013 included a Boeing B-52H Stratofortress from the 2nd Bomb Wing, two Lockheed Martin F-16C Fighting Falcons from the 35th Fighter Wing and a Boeing KC-135R Stratotanker from the 18th Wing on static display. A Boeing C-17A Globemaster III from the 15th Wing performed a regular flying display, as did an RAAF 36 Squadron C-17A.

The Royal Australian Air Force had a strong presence at Avalon 2013, including a four-ship display by the Boeing F/A-18F Super Hornets of No. 82 Wing. Examples of most RAAF aircraft were on static display, including the Boeing E-7A Wedgetail Airborne Early Warning & Control aircraft and Airbus KC-30A Multi-Role Tanker Transport. Making their debut at an Australian airshow was the Japan Air Self Defence Force, (JASDF) with the brief appearance of a Boeing KC-767J tanker from 404 Hikotai/1 Yuso Kokutai during the trade days.

Other highlights included the popular Breitling Wingwalkers with their two Boeing PT-17 Stearman biplanes. They were reduced to a single aircraft after one suffered an engine failure during the display on the trade days. Melissa Pemberton (Edge 540) and Skip Stewart (Pitts Special) combined with the pyrotechnics of Rich Gibson in the TinStix of Dynamite routine. Large corporate jets were prominent during the trade show, with the Airbus A319CJ, Embraer Lineage 1000 and Gulfstream 650 all making their debut at an Australian International Airshow.

=== 12th edition (2015) ===
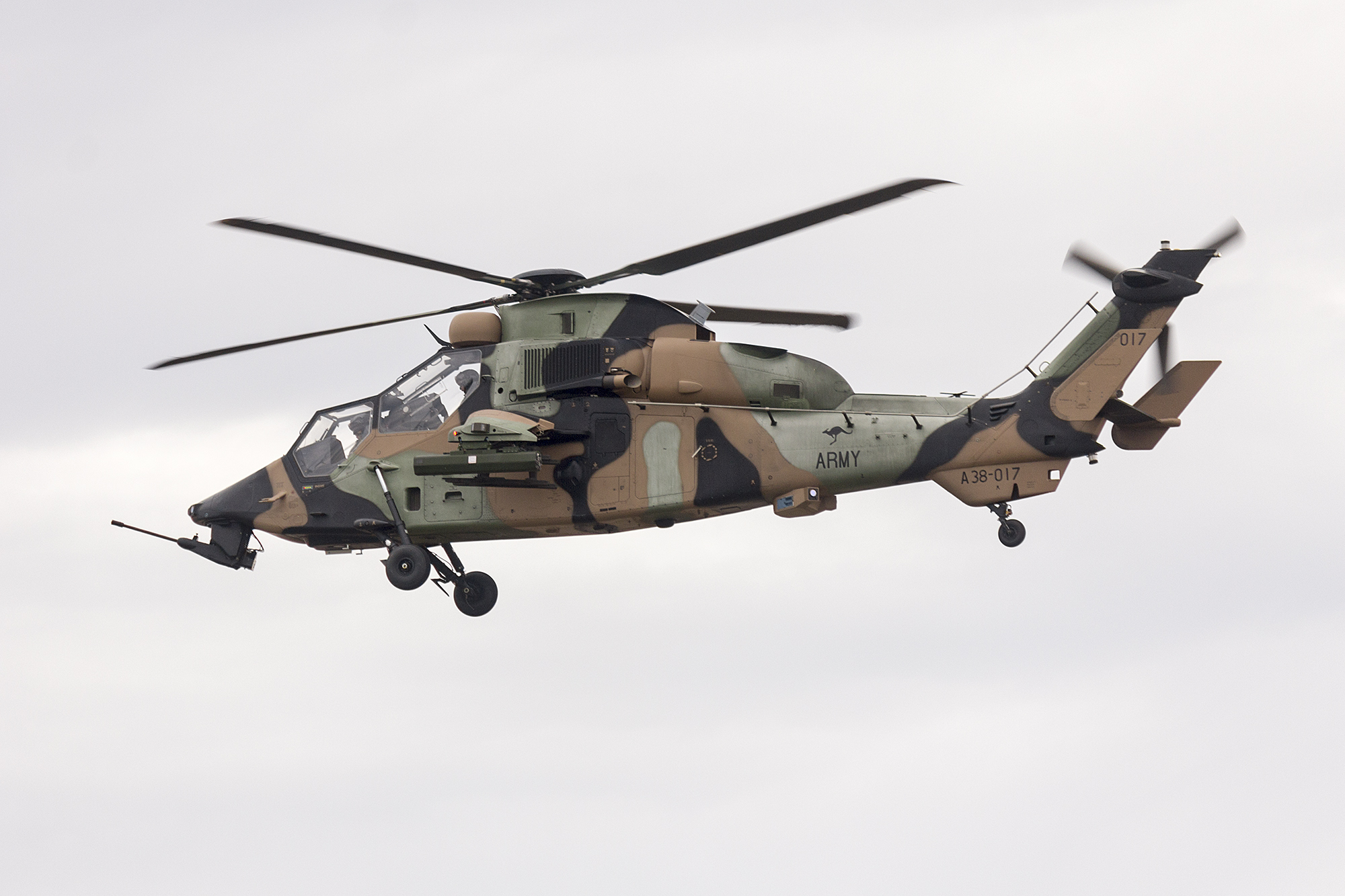
An Australian Army (A38-017) Tiger ARH display, 2015

The 2015 Australian International Airshow was held at Avalon between 24 February and 1 March. The theme was 'A Centenary of Anzac 1915–2015, Heroes of the Sky.' More than 600 firms attended the event.

2015 marked the centenary of the formation of the Australia and New Zealand Army Corps (ANZAC) and their landing at Gallipoli. The main attractions at the 2015 air show included the F/A-18, the B-52H, a new addition to the airshow: the HARS Lockheed P-2 as well as multiple future RAAF aircraft.

The Australian Army flew their MRH90 Taipan and Tiger ARH helicopters for the first time. The Republic of Singapore Air Force display team Black Knights performed a two-ship F-16 display routine. A large number of warbirds and other historical aircraft also participated in the event.

Qantas showed off their newest Boeing 737 "Retro Roo" and a new aboriginal F/A-18 scheme was released. A JASDF KC-767J refueller made an appearance again during the trade days, leaving on the first full public day.

=== 13th edition (2017) ===
The 2017 Australian International Airshow was held between 28 February and 5 March at Avalon. It was noteworthy for the first appearances of many new RAAF types, as well as a large number of US aircraft.

The 2017 edition featured the first Australian appearance of the RAAF's new Lockheed-Martin F-35 Lightning and the E/A-18 Growlers. Featured were new C-27J Spartan, P-8 Poseidon, and PC-21 RAAF aircraft.

Fourteen US military aircraft attended the airshow, the largest number of US aircraft in the show's history. 2017 marked the second appearance of the USAF's Lockheed F-22 Raptors, and a return of the Rockwell B-1B Lancer, Boeing KC-135 Stratotanker and two General-Dynamics F-16s. A P-8 from the US Navy was present.

Regular aircraft such as the Lockheed C-130, C-17 Globemaster III and the RAAF Roulettes were present.

Other participating countries included the Republic of Singapore Air Force (RSAF) with a KC-135 Stratotanker, two McDonnell Douglas F-15s and a C-130. The Japan Air Self-Defense Force again sent a KC-767, and the Royal Air Force sent an Airbus A400M Atlas to participate. In terms of attendance the 2017 airshow was the largest yet, with more than 210,000 people attending.

There was a small anti-war protest nearby.

=== 14th edition (2019) ===
The 2019 Australian International Airshow was held from 26 February to 3 March.

=== 15th edition (2023) ===
Owing to the COVID-19 pandemic, the 2021 Airshow was at first rescheduled to be held on 26–28 November, but in August 2021, with the pandemic continuing, the organisers decided to abandon it altogether.

While the Airshow could not proceed in 2021, it ran from 28 February to 5 March 2023.

=== 16th edition (2025) ===
On 28 March 2025, during the first day of public displays at the Avalon Australian International Airshow, a single aerobatic display aircraft, a Pitts Special of the Paul Bennet Airshows team, crashed at approximately 17:30 AEDT. The aircraft was performing a manoeuvre when it impacted the ground. Emergency services responded promptly, and the veteran pilot, Glenn Collins was extracted from the wreckage and transported to hospital in a serious but stable condition with upper and lower body injuries.

Following the incident, the remainder of the day's airshow activities were cancelled. Organisers announced that the event would resume the following day, with the aerobatic group not performing. Authorities launched an investigation into the cause of the crash.

== See also ==
- Asian Aerospace
- Dubai Airshow
- Farnborough International Airshow
- List of air shows
- Paris Air Show
- Royal International Air Tattoo
- Singapore Airshow

== Footnotes ==
Bibliography

- Wilson, Stewart, ed. (2011). Official Avalon 2011 Programme: Feel the Power. Chevron Publishing Group.
