= African Safari World =

Proposed amusement park and zoo in Australia

- Previously known as Werribee Open Range Zoo
- Interactive map of African Safari World
- Location: Werribee, Victoria, Australia
- Coordinates: 37.9229°S 144.6673°E
- Opened: 2010 ^{(Expected)} Delayed Indefinitely
- Owner: Village Roadshow
- Operated by: Warner Village Theme Parks
- Slogan: Animal adventure meets thrills and excitement
- Attendance: 1.3 million ^{(Expected)}
- Area: 40 hectares (99 acres)
- Website: www.village.com.au/

African Safari World was a proposed amusement park and zoo, to replace the Werribee Open Range Zoo, 32 kilometres (20 mi) southwest of Melbourne, Australia. Warner Village Theme Parks, who already own and operate several properties on the Gold Coast in Queensland, was behind the proposal. The park was scheduled to open in 2010. On 1 June 2008 the Victorian government said it had rejected the proposal, because the cost to taxpayers would have been too great.

== Proposal ==
The park would have occupied 40 hectares (99 acres) of land and would include major thrill rides, roller coasters, restaurants and African-themed shops. The attractions would tie in with the existing open range zoo, sharing an African safari theme and the zoo would be redeveloped.

The project was estimated to cost A$220 million, was expected to draw 1.3 million visitors each year and add A$864 million to the state's economy over 10 years. 6,700 new construction jobs would be created and the park itself would employ 500 people during operation. It would have been marketed as a location where "animal adventure meets thrills and excitement".

=== Attractions ===
The concept art for the park.

Several attractions were proposed including:

- Serengeti Safari - An African animal tour. This tour was expected to be a redeveloped Werribee Open Range Zoo which was to feature:
  - Habitat and enclosure improvements
  - Increased animal numbers
  - Wildlife education and conservation centre
  - Australian animal experience
- A variety of rides, including water rides and Australia's greatest roller coaster
- Man-made lakes and mountains
- A Four Dimensional Theatre

== Support ==
Victorian Tourism Minister Tim Holding supported the proposal, stating; "From our perspective, this is a very exciting proposal...It's one that we think can bring great benefits, not only to Victorian families who have to fly all the way to Queensland, all the way to the Gold Coast to see world-class theme parks...We think it's a fantastic proposal, it's one that we want to give very serious consideration to."

The cost to Victorian taxpayers, which was expected to exceed A$100 million, combined with Werribee Open Range Zoo's refusal caused the plan to be indefinitely delayed.

In July 2013, it was proposed by Geelong City Council that a theme park be built at nearby Avalon Airport, and they have restarted discussions with Village Roadshow.
