= Werribee Open Range Zoo =

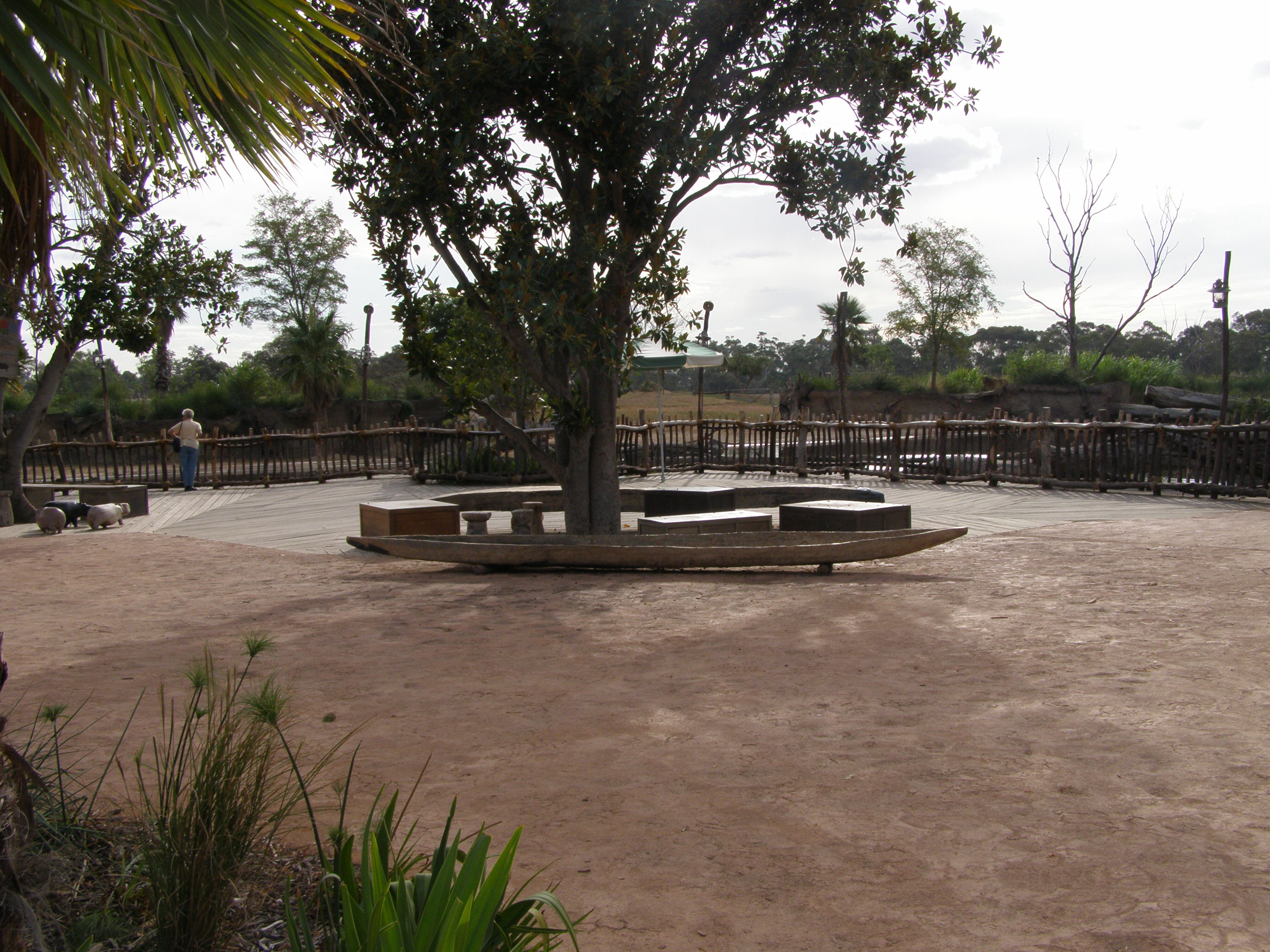
- Werribee Zoo hippo exhibit
- Interactive map of Werribee Open Range Zoo
- 37.9229°S 144.6673°E
- Date opened: 1983
- Location: Werribee, Victoria, Australia
- Land area: 225 hectares (560 acres)
- Memberships: ZAA
- Major exhibits: Some of the animals include: elephants, hippopotamuses, rhinoceroses, lions, gorillas, giraffes, zebras, antelopes, wild horses, camels, marsupials, ostriches, tortoises and others
- Website: www.zoo.org.au/Werribee

Werribee Open Range Zoo is an African themed zoo in Werribee, about 32 kilometres (20 mi) south-west of Melbourne, Victoria, Australia. It is part of the Zoological Parks and Gardens Board or Zoos Victoria, which also includes Melbourne Zoo, Kyabram Fauna Park, and Healesville Sanctuary. It is situated on approximately 225 hectares (560 acres) and is located on the Werribee River in Werribee Park, adjacent to the Werribee Park Mansion. It was originally agistment land to the Melbourne Zoo. Werribee Open Range Zoo was home to 360 animals of 40 species as of 2021.

== Overview ==
Visitors to the zoo can take a bus tour, which normally lasts 35–40 minutes, multiple times a day, and takes up to 140 people per bus.

The zoo has a simulated African village, with educational and entertaining features, including a mock scenario of an African ranger and his adventures tracking lions, and an interactive soundscape walk with simulated lion sounds surrounding the walker. There are two independent trails that visitors may follow: the Pula Reserve Walking Trail which focuses on African animals and the Australian Journey Walk, which focuses on Australian animals.

A Learning Centre teaches more about the history and geography of animals in their environments.

Visitors can also book various "speciality" tours, including the Off Road Safari, or close encounters with gorillas or giraffe.

Werribee Open Range Zoo also has an animal/adoption sponsorship program, which is used for gifts and other altruistic purposes.

In April 2008 it was announced that a theme park known as African Safari World was proposed, by Warner Village Theme Parks to be built on the grounds of the zoo. On 1 July 2008 the proposed theme park plans were indefinitely postponed, with the government citing the potential $100 million cost to the taxpayer as the reason for the delay.

== Animals and exhibits ==
The zoo is setup in multiple large areas:

Safari Tour

- American bison
- Blackbuck
- Common eland
- Dromedary camel
- Giraffe
- Nyala
- Ostrich
- Plains zebra
- Przewalski's horse
- Scimitar oryx
- Southern white rhinoceros
- Waterbuck

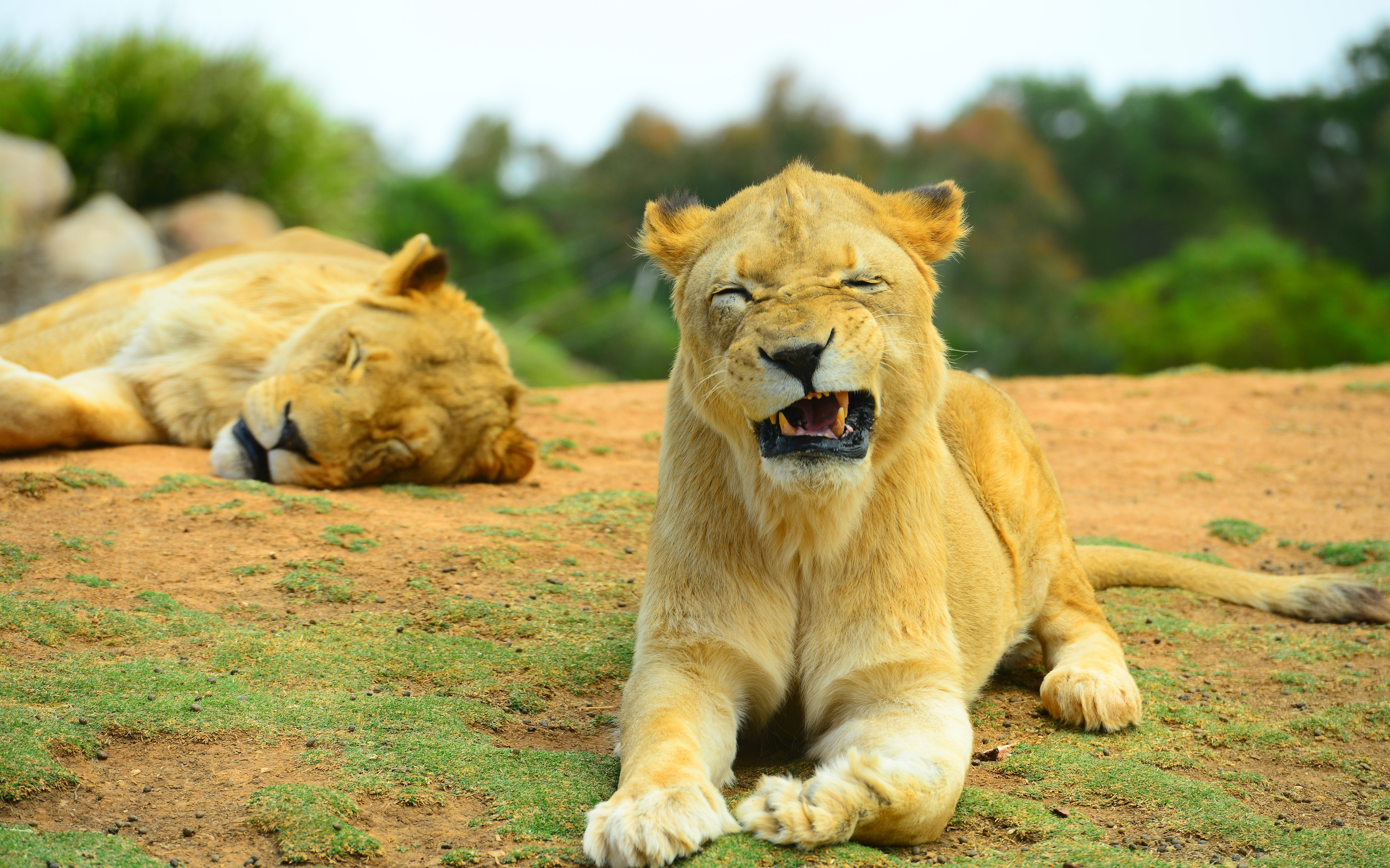
African lions (two lionesses)

African River Trail

- African lion
- Bell's hinge-back tortoise
- Hippopotamus
- Meerkat
- Cheetah
- Serval
- Vervet monkey
- Western lowland gorilla

Elephant Trail

- Asian elephant

Waterhole Trail

- Dromedary camel
- Nyala
- Ostrich
- Plains zebra
- Scimitar oryx

Australian Trail

- Dumeril's boa
- Eastern blue-tongued lizard
- Eastern grey kangaroo
- Emu
- Koala
- Leopard tortoise
- Orange-bellied parrot
- Shingleback lizard
- Tammar wallaby

== Gorilla exhibit in African River Trail ==
In 2011, Werribee Zoo gained three male western lowland gorillas from Melbourne Zoo. These consist of an adult silverback and his two sons. The new public display gorilla habitat is a 10,000 m^{2} (2.5 acres) sanctuary that features wide-open spaces, climbing structures and indoor facilities. This new facility enable Zoos Victoria to provide best-practice care for the bachelor gorillas and confirm the organisation's reputation as a world leader in gorilla management. The Victorian Government recently gave $1.5 million to support the construction of this $2.2 million facility. Zoos Victoria Foundation is seeking public support to help raise the remaining $700,000 through the West Gorillas in the West campaign.

In 2010, the zoo made national headlines over the gorilla enclosure when comedy duo Hamish & Andy dressed in gorilla suits and played with radio controlled cars and golf clubs as part of a television special. Some viewers believed the zoo was attempting to con them and complained.

== Elephant Trail ==
In 2024, Werribee Open Range Zoo expanded with the development of a state-of-the-art, 210,000 m^{2} (52 acres) habitat designed for Asian elephants. The $88 million project, funded by the Victorian Government, included two purpose-built barns with 9-meter-high ceilings and 2-meter-deep sand floors to ensure the elephants' comfort. The habitat consists of seven management yards, two large pools, a visitor walking trail, and elephant overpasses. In February 2025 Melbourne Zoo's nine Asian elephants were relocated to this facility. The 'Elephant Trail' habitats opened to the public in late March 2025.

== Gallery ==
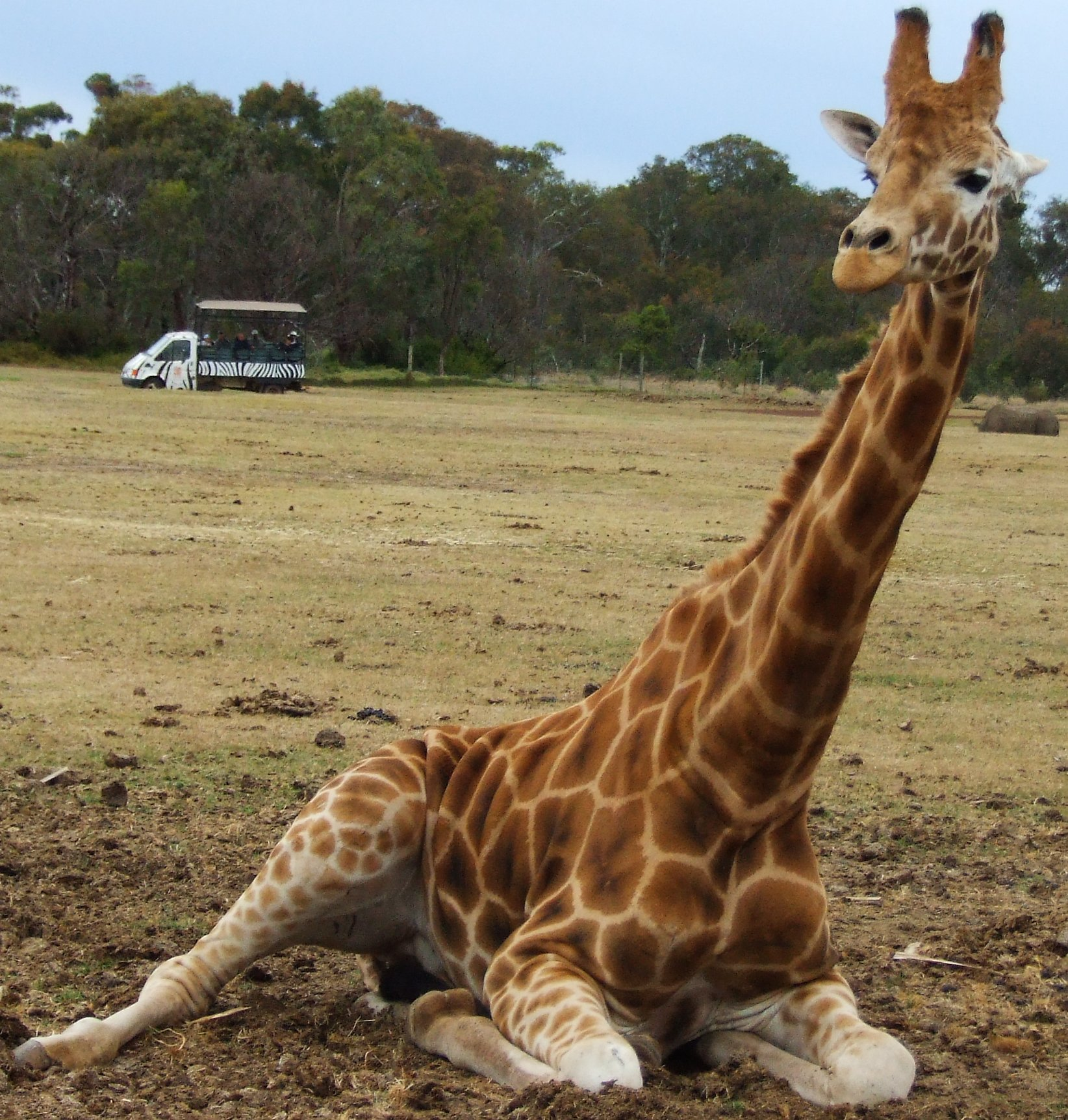
A giraffe rests with a safari truck in the background.

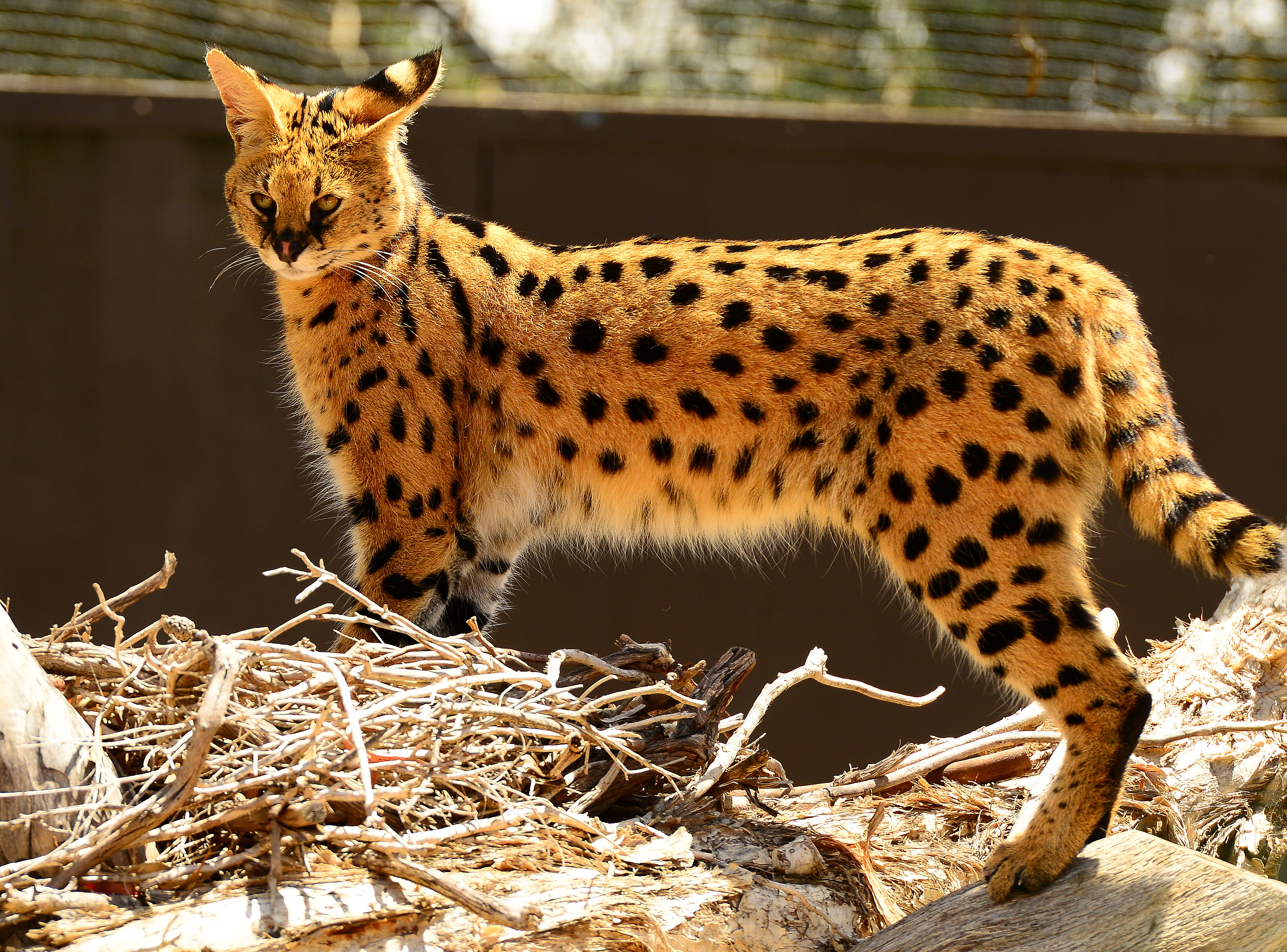
Serval

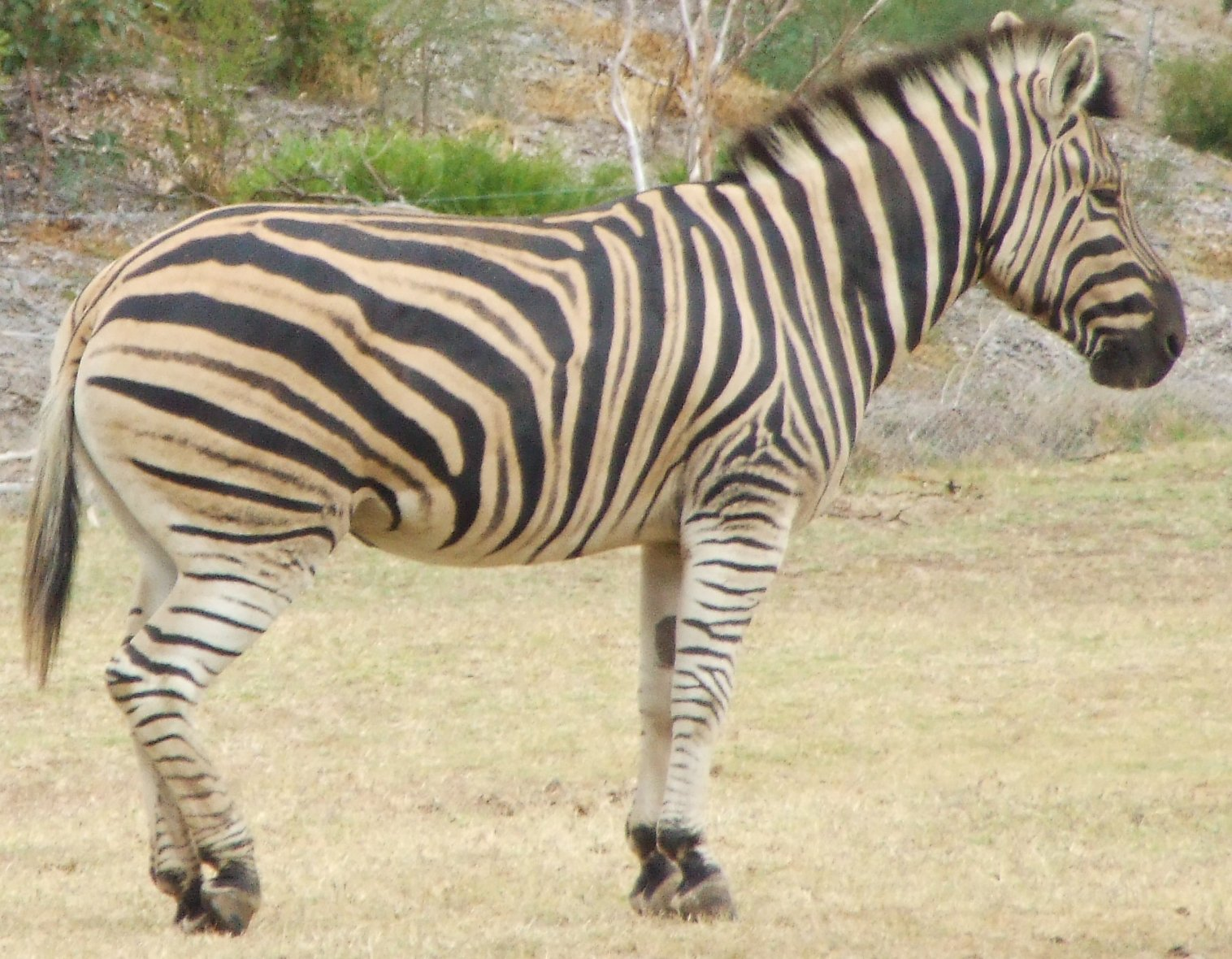
Zebra

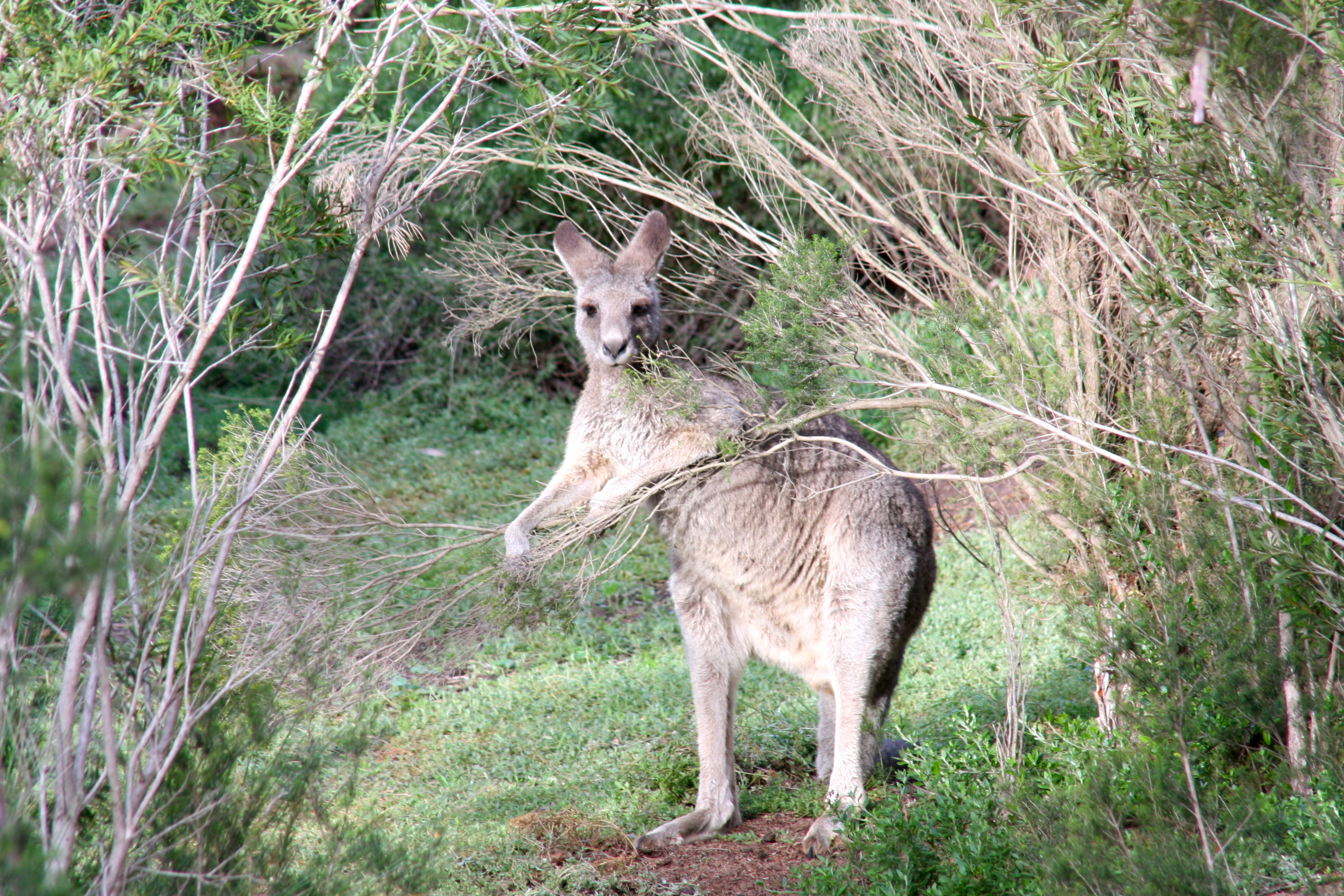
Kangaroo

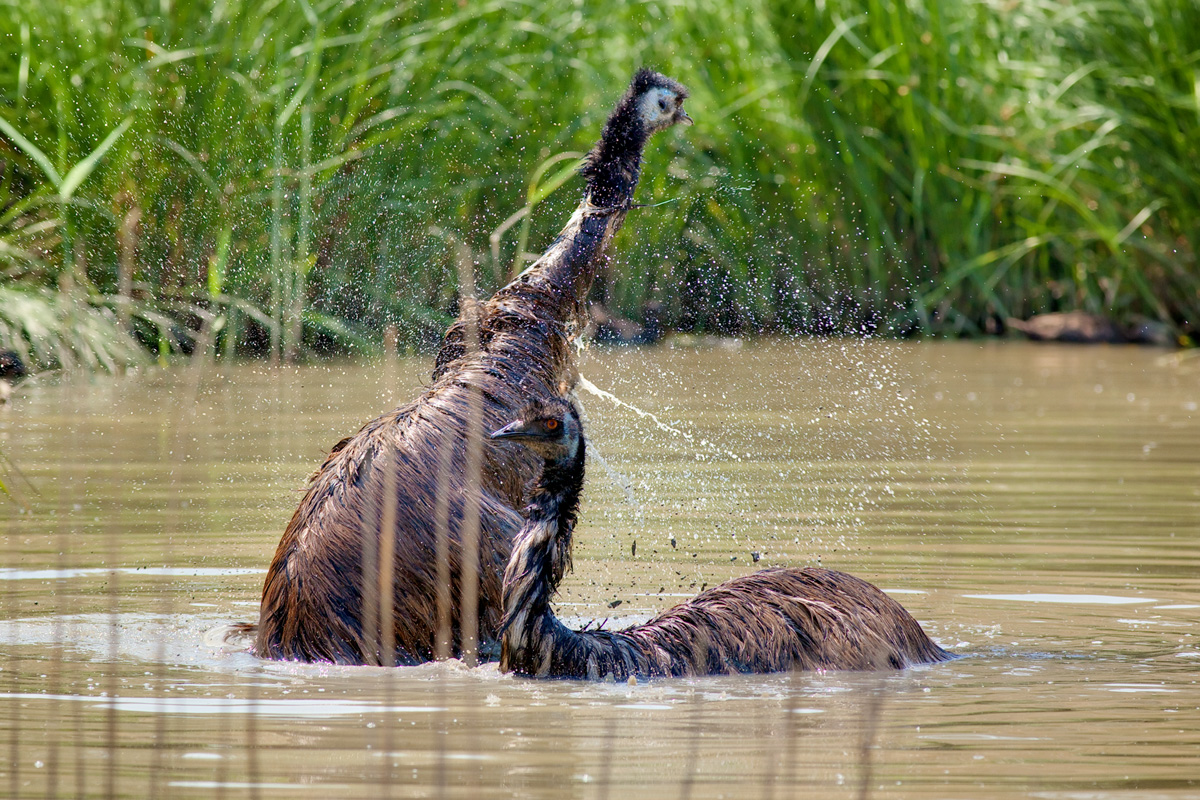
Emus
