= William J. Williams (Methodist) =

William James Williams (Note: He is not to be confused with William J. Williams, Methodist minister of Christchurch, New Zealand, editor of the N.Z. Methodist Times and father of Harold Williams, linguist.) (c. 1884 – 12 August 1956) was a Methodist minister in the state of Victoria, Australia.

== History ==
Williams was born in Bendigo, eldest son of James Williams, later of "Perrinwell", Chomley Street, Windsor, Victoria.

He was ordained in 1914 and posted to Katamatite In 1915 he was posted to Wamboota, New South Wales. and in 1916–1918 as superintendent in the Warragul circuit, alternating with the home missionary at Neerim South. then at Kyabram from 1924 to 1928, when he was replaced by Rev. G. B. Campbell.

In 1928 he succeeded H. G. Secomb as superintendent of the Shepparton circuit and chairman of the Goulburn Valley District Synod.

In 1930 he was invited to take over the Sydney Road, Brunswick church, which he held as superintendent of the Brunswick circuit from 1931 to 1935, when he left for that of the New Street church, Brighton, followed by the church at Sandringham.

He was elected president of the Victorian Protestant Federation in 1938 and president of the Council of Churches in Victoria in 1941.

He served as chairman of the Melbourne South Methodist district for a record 16 years.

He was elected president of the Methodist Conference of Victoria in 1949

He died in Epworth Hospital on 12 August 1956

== Family ==
Williams married Helen Sarah Baud (1885–1967) on 4 April 1914. Their children included:

- W. Kenneth Williams, was Flying Officer with 83rd Squadron, RAAF, lost, presumed killed June 1942.
- Gwenyth Helen Williams (1917–2011), sister at Epworth Hospital
- Sir Bruce Rodda Williams (1919–2010), lecturer in economics in Adelaide University, later vice-chancellor of Sydney University.
- Colin Williams (1921– ) won a scholarship to Drew Theological Seminary of New York, appointed dean of the faculty of divinity at Yale University 1969–1979. He married Phyllis Miller in 1949; they had three daughters.
- Morris Williams was sub-dean of the faculty of education, Melbourne University.
- Ruth Williams taught music at Methodist Ladies' College.

Rev. Robert Williams, President of the Victoria and Tasmania' Conference of the Methodist Church in 1944, was a brother.
