= Holy Trinity Church, Miejsce Odrzańskie =

Coordinates: 50.1148°N 18.1313°E

Holy Trinity Church
- Kościół Trójcy Świętej
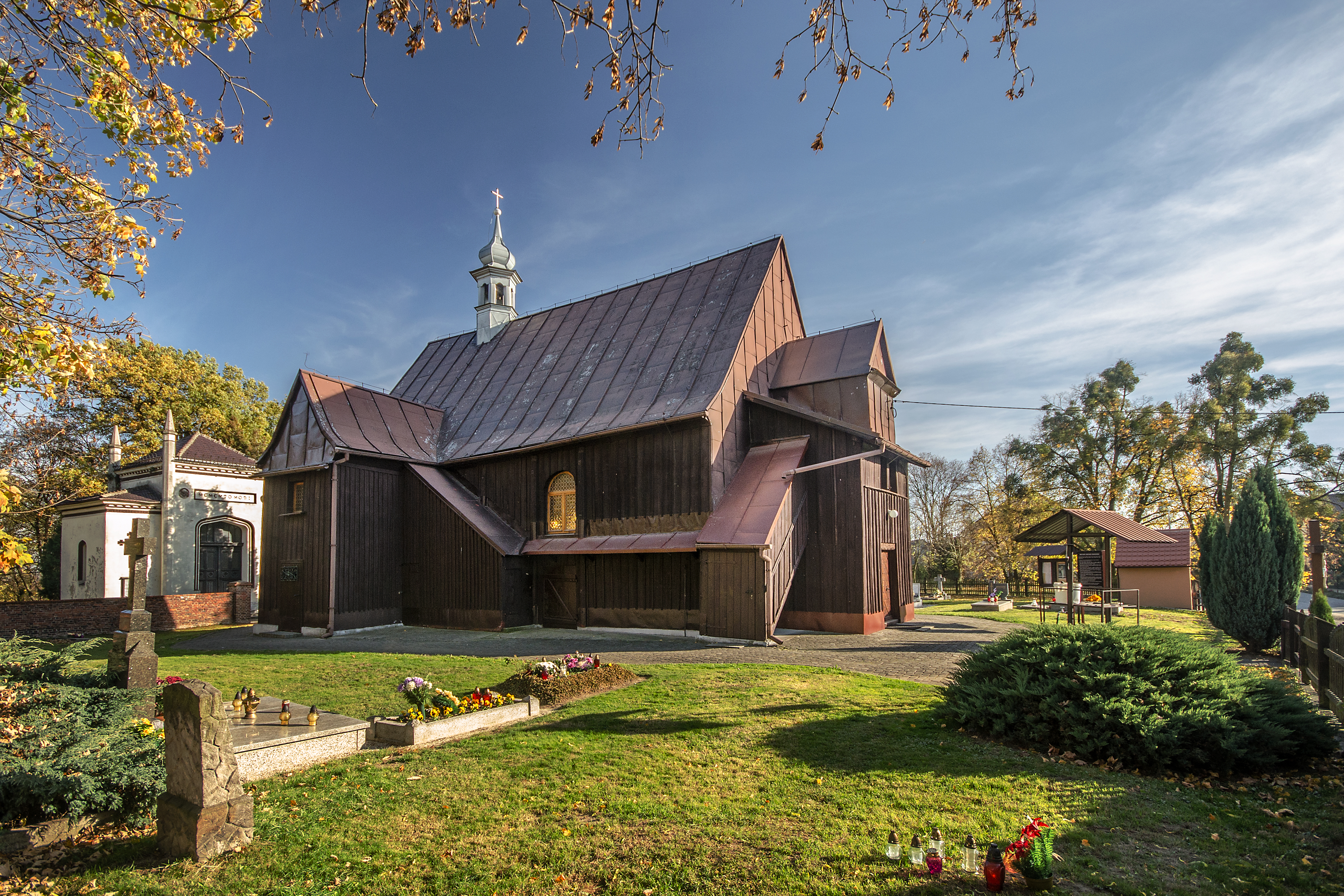
- Holy Trinity Church
- Holy Trinity Church
- Location: Miejsce Odrzańskie
- Country: Poland
- Denomination: Roman Catholic

History
- Founder: Henryk Henschl

Architecture
- Completed: 1770

Specifications
- Materials: Wood

Administration
- Diocese: Roman Catholic Diocese of Opole
- Parish: Parafia św. Jerzego w Sławikowie

Holy Trinity Church in Miejsce Odrzańskie, Poland, is a wooden chapel of ease belonging to St. George's Parish in Sławików, part of the Roman Catholic Diocese of Opole.

The church was built in 1770 by carpenter Henryk Henschl.
