= Cynna Kydd =

Australian netball player

Personal information
- Full name: Cynna Kydd (Née: Neele)
- Born: 18 September 1981 (age 45) Kyabram, Victoria, Australia
- Height: 1.88 m (6 ft 2 in)
- Spouse: Garth Kydd
- University: Victoria University

Netball career
- Playing positions: GA, GS
Years	Club team	Apps
2006	Melbourne Phoenix	
2000–2006	Melbourne Kestrels	
Years	National team	Caps
2003–05	Australia	
Medal record
Representing Australia
Netball World Championships
Silver medal – second place	2003 Kingston	Netball
- Updated on 2009-03-20

Cynna Kydd (née Neele; born 18 September 1981 in Kyabram, Victoria) is a former Australian professional netball player. Kydd achieved some success in netball and swimming in her early life, and played in the Dairy Farmers State League at the age of 16. She was also selected for the national under-21 team in 1999 and was accepted by the Australian Institute of Sport, before launching her professional career.

Kydd was a goal shooter for the Melbourne Kestrels in the Commonwealth Bank Trophy from 2000 to 2006, serving as club captain for the last two years. An accurate and high-scoring shooter, she was one of the league's top players of that era, winning the competition's Most Valuable Player award for 2004. She was also a frequent member of the Australian national netball team from 2003 to 2005. Her career was hampered by injury and poor form in later years, and she struggled after being dropped from the national side in early 2005 and missing out on a return in time for the 2006 Commonwealth Games after sustaining a serious concussion late in the year.

Kydd made the surprise decision at the beginning of the 2006 season to transfer from the Kestrels, where she had been captain, to the club's more successful rival, the Melbourne Phoenix, but she lasted only one season before walking away from the club to travel overseas. She subsequently signed with New Zealand club Canterbury Flames for the 2007 National Bank Cup season, but withdrew her services before playing a game due to injury. She subsequently moved to England, where she played mixed minor grade netball.

== Early life ==
Kydd was born in the Victorian regional town of Kyabram, and began playing competitive netball at age nine. Though also a talented swimmer, she was forced to make a choice between the two sports, and ultimately chose netball. She played for local and Goulburn Valley representative teams as a teenager and, in 1998 at the age of 16, was selected to play for the dominant Eastside Netball Club in the state Dairy Farmers State League competition, alongside three national league players. Despite a regular three-hour commute and having to juggle sporting commitments with studies at Kyabram Secondary College, she played an integral role in Eastside's premiership that year. She was subsequently named in the state under-21 squad for the annual Australian National Netball Championships and in the Melbourne Kestrels squad for the 1999 season.

Despite never having played a national league game, Kydd was selected in the national under-21 (U-21) team in 1999, which, as a result of reforms made that year, automatically saw her admitted to the Australian Institute of Sport (AIS). She spent the 1999 season playing for the AIS team in the Victorian state league, before switching to their South Australian counterparts for the 2000 season. Kydd, at 188 cm (6 ft 2 in) tall, established a reputation as an effective shooter, and despite often missing matches as a result of her national U-21 team was a key part of the team.

== Commonwealth Bank Trophy debut ==
Kydd made her debut for the Melbourne Kestrels in April 2000 but, because of her relative inexperience, was asked to play only two games for them over the season. She earned selection in the U-21 national squad to tour Jamaica in May, followed by a successful stint with the team as part of the squad for the Youth World Cup in Wales. At season's end Kydd was named in the state open team for the national championships and, while remaining in the U-21 squad, was also named in the initial national open squad, despite having only played two national league games. However, the national squad was at the time enjoying an unusual glut of shooters, and she was cut amidst fierce competition from six other prominent players, all aiming at just three positions in the final team. Her disappointment was, however, partly offset when she won the Commonwealth Bank Trophy's Best New Talent award, worth A$5,000, in February 2001.

Kydd graduated from high school at the end of 2000, and moved to Kensington, an inner suburb of Melbourne, in February 2001 to study tourism and hospitality at Victoria University. At the beginning of the 2001 season, two of the Kestrels' main stars, Shelley O'Donnell and Janine Ilitch, both announced that they would be sidelined for most or all of the season because of pregnancy, and Kydd was called upon to fill the vacancy. She became a core player instantly, and although the Kestrels struggled, Kydd formed an effective combination with goal shooter Amanda Burton (who she had previously played with in the interstate competition). Kydd was among the team's standout performers and was frequently praised in the media for both her accuracy and consistency, coming away at season's end with 390 goals and the fifth highest scoring average in the competition. She continued to represent Australia in under-21 competition, being selected for several home matches against England and a tour of New Zealand, and was again selected in the national open squad in the lead-up to the 2002 Commonwealth Games, but was once again cut from the final team.

== Furthering her career ==
Though she had missed out on Commonwealth Games selection, Kydd had established a reputation as a particularly difficult opponent by the beginning of the 2002 Commonwealth Bank Trophy season. She was consistently among the league's top goalers, particularly after she was again paired with Burton, due to the axing of struggling new recruit Kristy Doyle. She scored her 500th goal with the Kestrels in the middle of the season, and excelled against some particularly difficult opponents, including then-Australian captain Kathryn Harby-Williams. She was integral in helping the Kestrels make the semifinals for the first time since 1999, and was the third-highest scorer in the league. Kydd was again named in the extended national squad at the end of the season, and finally survived the cut, being named in the squad to tour Jamaica in early 2003, beating rival shooters Jane Altschwager and Megan Dehn (née Anderson) for the vacancy caused by the retirement of veteran player Jacqui Delaney.

=== International selection ===
At only 21 Kydd was the youngest player on the tour of Jamaica and, while she toured with the remainder of the team, was overlooked for a Test position. She finally made her full début against South Africa not long afterwards, and managed to cement her position with a superb performance, managing an accuracy rate of 94% in the third Test. This performance, along with similar form in the national league, led to her selection in the starting squad for the 2003 Netball World Championships. She played every game in the world championships in July at the expense of ageing veteran Eloise Southby, a decision which was the cause of some controversy. She subsequently helped the Kestrels to the elimination final and, at the end of the season, was named as the team's new vice-captain, with predecessor Janine Ilitch assuming the captaincy. She also won the coveted Commonwealth Bank Trophy Player's Player Award, and tied for third in the Most Valuable Player count.

=== Career peak ===
With the experience gained from several seasons in the national league, Kydd reached her peak in 2004. She was rarely troubled in the national league all year, scoring 436 goals at an average accuracy of 79%; statistics among the best in the league. Although Burton had retired, creating a supporting void that the Kestrels struggled to fill, she again played a vital role in the team reaching the finals series. She also established her place as a regular member of the national team, playing in Test series against South Africa and New Zealand and a practice match against England. Though she struggled initially against the Silver Ferns, Kydd improved over the space of the series and was awarded player of the match in the third Test. At the end of the tour, she was given some praise for being among Australia's best in what had been an otherwise disastrous series. She was rewarded for her form when she was a surprise choice for the 2004 Commonwealth Bank Trophy Most Valuable Player Award, being selected over favourite veteran internationals Catherine Cox and Sharelle McMahon. When captain Ilitch was ruled out for 2005 because of pregnancy, Kydd was the natural choice to replace her, and she was soon announced as the Kestrels' new leader.

== Form slump and injuries ==
Kydd graduated from university at the end of 2004, but had significant difficulty finding employment as her netball commitments scared off prospective employers. She also became engaged to Garth Kydd, a member of the Australian men's netball team, whom she married in April 2006. Kydd was widely expected to again feature among the league's best, however, she was disappointing against South Africa in February. She also struggled in the opening games of the national league season, a result largely attributed to nerves associated with the captaincy. She began to recover her form, but in May broke her finger. She continued to play but the injury severely inhibited her performance for four weeks. In June she was dropped from the national team for the first time in two years as a result of poor form and injury, with national coach Norma Plummer stating that she was "very disappointed that [Kydd had] let it drop" and that she "never thought she would have to [cut her from the team]". The ageing Southby-Halbish was brought in to replace her and Kydd admitted that her accuracy had been well below ideal levels. She improved markedly over the following two rounds, but on 23 July suffered major concussion after being hit hard in the head during a match against the Adelaide Thunderbirds, which required her to be taken to hospital. A brilliant performance against the Perth Orioles the following week seemed to suggest a quick recovery, however she was dogged with complications for the remainder of the season.

In an attempt to regain her position in the national squad, Kydd attended the extended squad's first training camp in September 2005, but was one of several players forced out after succumbing to a virus. She was subsequently left out of the team for a practice tour of Jamaica and New Zealand in the lead-up to the 2006 Commonwealth Games, but continued her efforts to make the team for the Games. Finally, on 10 December 2005, she voluntarily withdrew her name from selection, noting ongoing complications from the earlier concussion (team doctors stated that she had probably attempted to return too quickly) and low motivation.

== Defection to the Melbourne Phoenix ==
After withdrawing from the Commonwealth Games squad, Kydd took a four-month hiatus from the sport in order to recover from injury and regain motivation. She married fiancée Garth in April 2006, and though widely known by her maiden name, decided to take on her husband's surname. Kydd began the process of re-signing with the Kestrels for the 2006 season, and returned to training with the club with March 2006, but stunned the team when she defected to more successful rival Melbourne Phoenix only three weeks before the start of the season. The defection caused notable antagonism between the traditional rivals with Kydd's former coach, Jane Searle and several teammates expressing shock at the suddenness of the switch.

After six years at the Kestrels, the defection saw Kydd forced to adapt to a new shooting combination with veteran international Sharelle McMahon. As she had had little opportunity to train with the new team before the opening of the season, the pair initially had some difficulty adjusting to each other's style. After a tenuous start, however, the pair found form, and were able to form a relatively successful combination. Kydd scored 360 goals in the season, and assisted the Phoenix in becoming the top scoring side for the season, although occasionally patchy form from the team as a whole saw the Phoenix slip outside the top two at season's end. Kydd was overlooked for a return to international selection during the 2006–07 season.

In October 2006, Kydd announced that she was leaving the Phoenix after just one season, a move that stunned coach Julie Hoornweg. Kydd said that she was travelling overseas with her husband, leading to speculation she would play in New Zealand. Hoornweg said that if she had known that Kydd would not keep her long-term commitment, then she would have rather invested in young talent, referring to Kydd as a "player at risk". In November, New Zealand's Canterbury Flames announced Kydd in their squad for the 2007 National Bank Cup. Her contract was to start in February 2007, so that she could fulfil work commitments with Youth Hostels Association, Victoria. However, Kydd withdrew her services to the Flames without playing a match, citing medical advice, due to a concussion incident. In late 2007, Kydd was playing mixed netball in the United Kingdom in the PIM Mixed A competition.
