= Lancaster, Victoria =

Lancaster
- Town
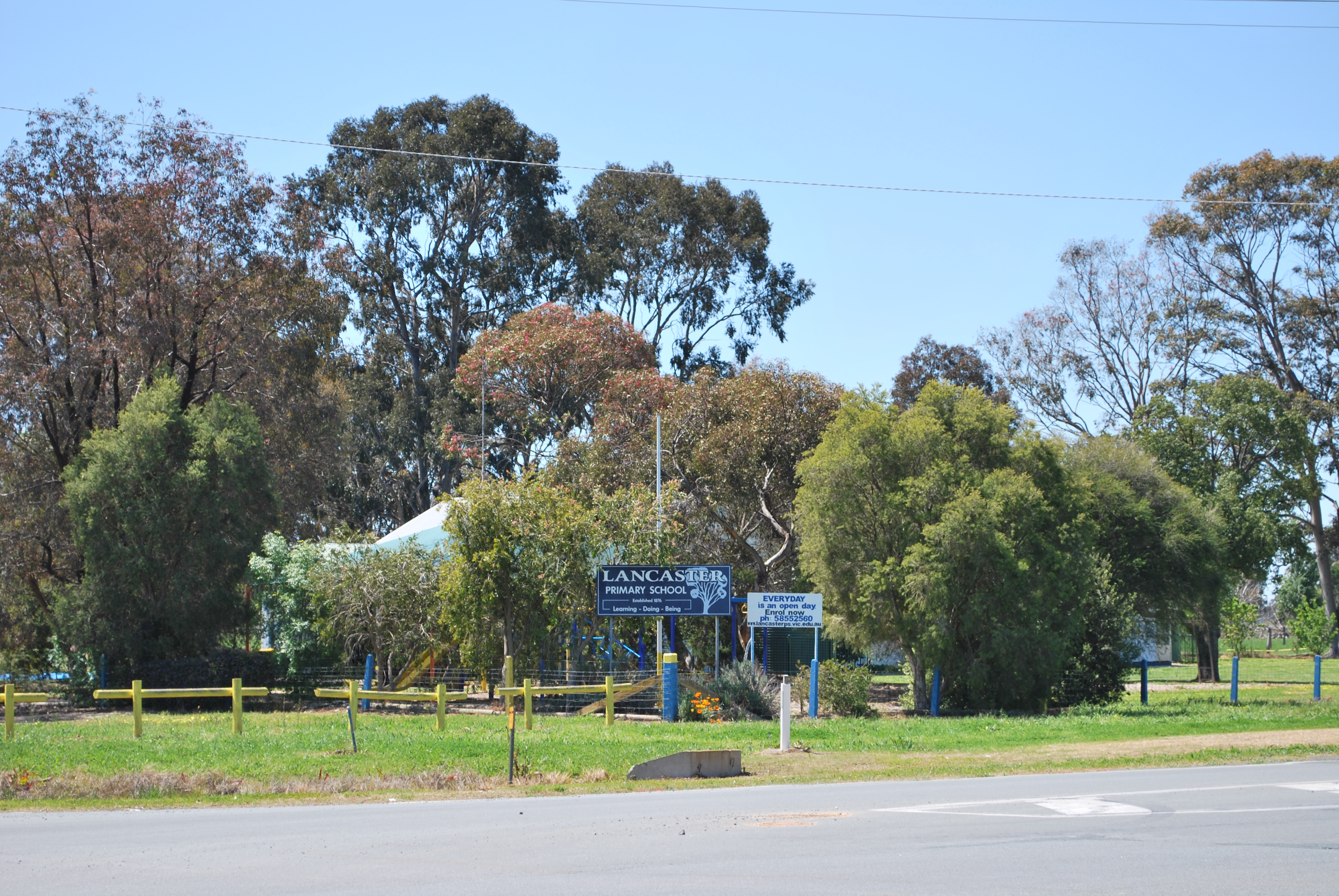
- Primary school

- Coordinates: 36°18′0″S 145°07′0″E
- Country: Australia
- State: Victoria
- Region: Hume
- LGAs: Shire of Campaspe; City of Greater Shepparton
- Location: 216 km (134 mi) N of Melbourne; 29 km (18 mi) NW of Shepparton; 11 km (6.8 mi) E of Kyabram

Government
  - State electorate: Murray Plains
  - Federal division: Nicholls

Population
  - Total: 393 (2016 census)
- Postcode: 3620

Lancaster is a locality in the Goulburn Valley region of Victoria, Australia. The town is located in Shire of Campaspe and the City of Greater Shepparton. At the 2016 census, Lancaster had a population of 393.

== History ==
The locality was named after Thomas Lancaster, an early settler in the region and the father of the state parliamentarian, Samuel Lancaster.

The Post Office opened on 15 November 1878 and a Kyabram East office opened on 28 November 1878. In 1881 the Lancaster office closed and Kyabram East was renamed Lancaster. This office closed in 1994.

== Today ==
The town has an Australian Rules football team competing in the Kyabram & District Football League.

The town also has a small primary school with about 40 children.

In 2014, Premier Fresh Australia established Lancaster Farms, the first glasshouse farm in Australia a retractable roof, to grow & market tomatoes. Present Treasurer of Victoria, Jaclyn Symes (then Minister for Resources) visited the site in October 2020.

In November 2025, Apple Inc. announced that it would commence the construction of a solar farm, hoping to be completed by 2030.
