= Günther von Reibnitz =

Prussian Army officer and later SS officer

Ortsgruppenleiter Baron Günther von Reibnitz
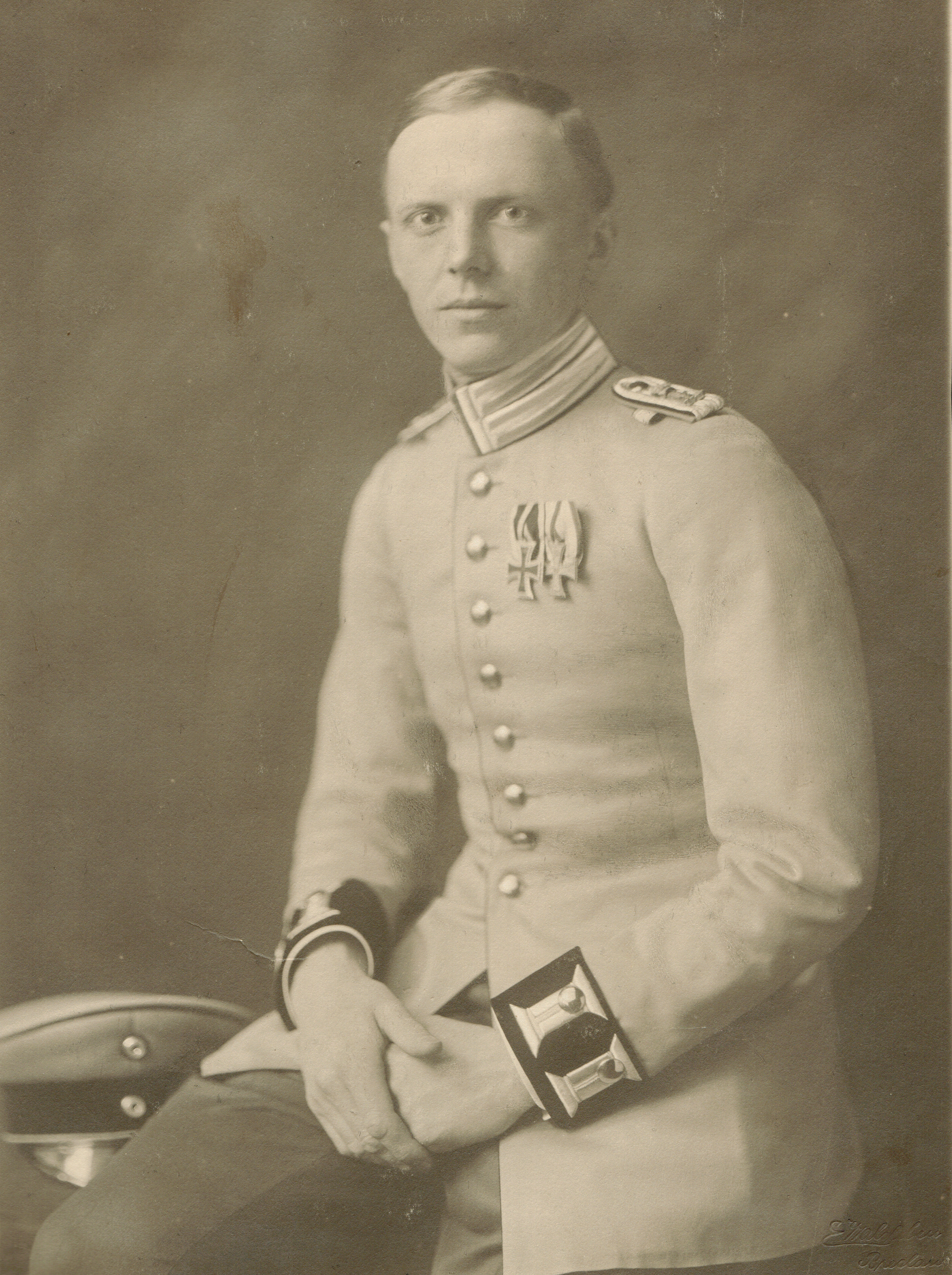
- Günther von Reibnitz (1918)
- Born: 8 September 1894; Mistitz, Kingdom of Prussia, German Empire (now Miejsce Odrzańskie, Poland)
- Died: 2 March 1983 (aged 88); Breitbrunn am Chiemsee, Bavaria, West Germany
- Buried: Garmisch-Partenkirchen
- Spouses: Margherita Schön (m. 1921; div. 1931) Countess Maria Anna Szapáry de Muraszombath, Széchysziget et Szapár (m. 1941; div. 1946) Esther Schütte (m. 1950; div. 1956) Rosemarie Kramer (m. 1956)
- Issue: Baroness Margarita von Reibnitz; Baron Friedrich von Reibnitz; Marie Christine, Princess Michael of Kent
- Parents: Baron Hans Egon von Reibnitz; Baroness Ida von Eickstedt
- Military service
- Allegiance: Nazi Germany
- Branch: Schutzstaffel
- Service years: 1933–1944
- Rank: Ortsgruppenleiter
- Service number: 66010

Günther-Hubertus Freiherr von Reibnitz (8 September 1894 – 2 March 1983) was a German nobleman and a cavalry officer in the German army during the First World War. He joined the Nazi Partyin 1930 and was a member of the SS Cavalry Corps, but was dismissed by the party in 1944 for perceived disloyalty.

Reibnitz married four times and was the father of Princess Michael of Kent. Two of his grandchildren, Lord Frederick Windsor and Lady Gabriella Windsor, are in the line of succession to the British throne. They are also great-grandchildren of King George V.

== Early life ==
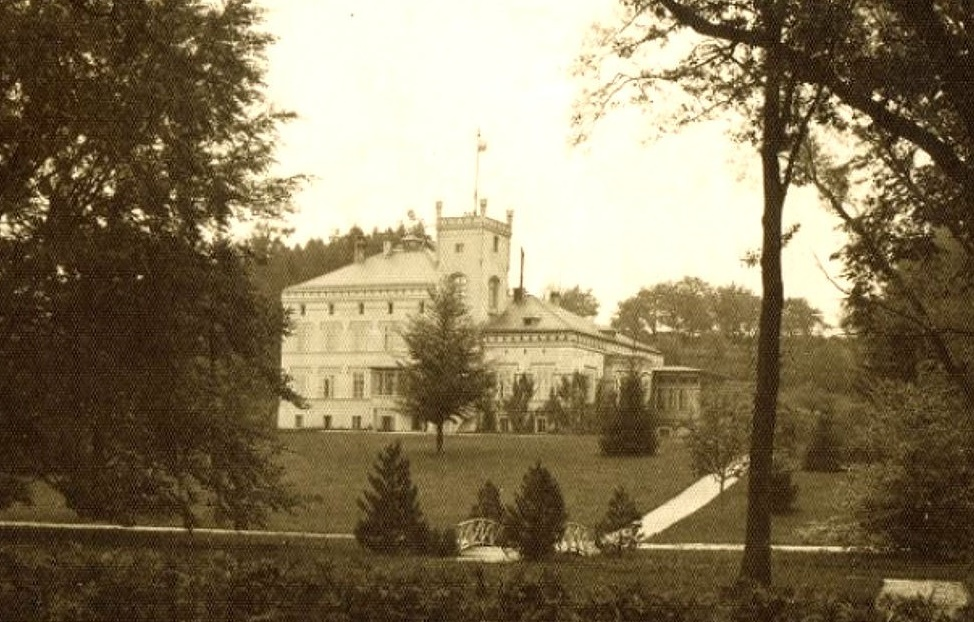
Gross Grauden schloss, residence of the Reibnitz family

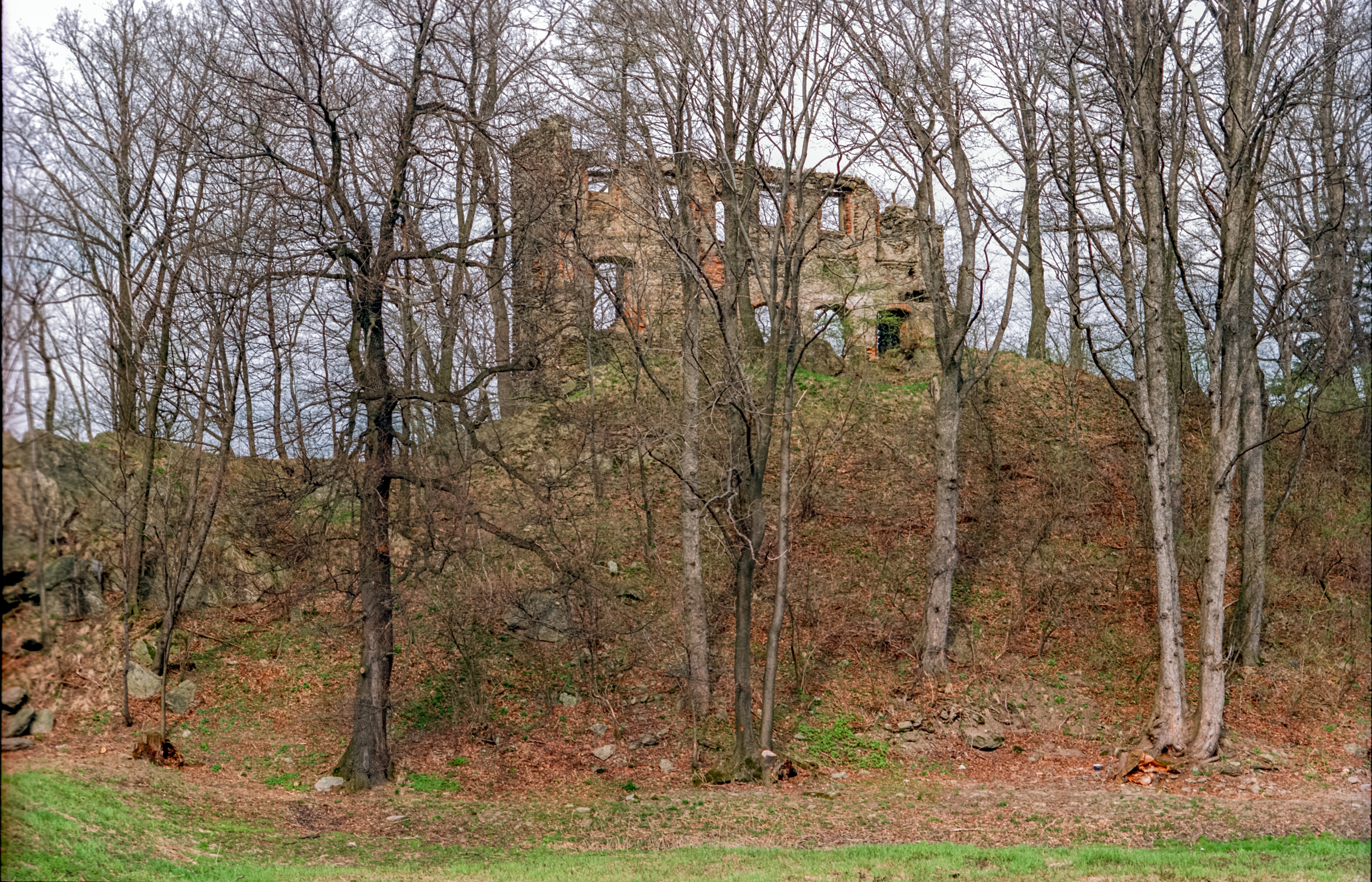
Ruins of Burg Läusepelz, original seat of the Reibnitz family, first acquired by Ritter Nicholas von Reibnitz at the beginning of the 14th century

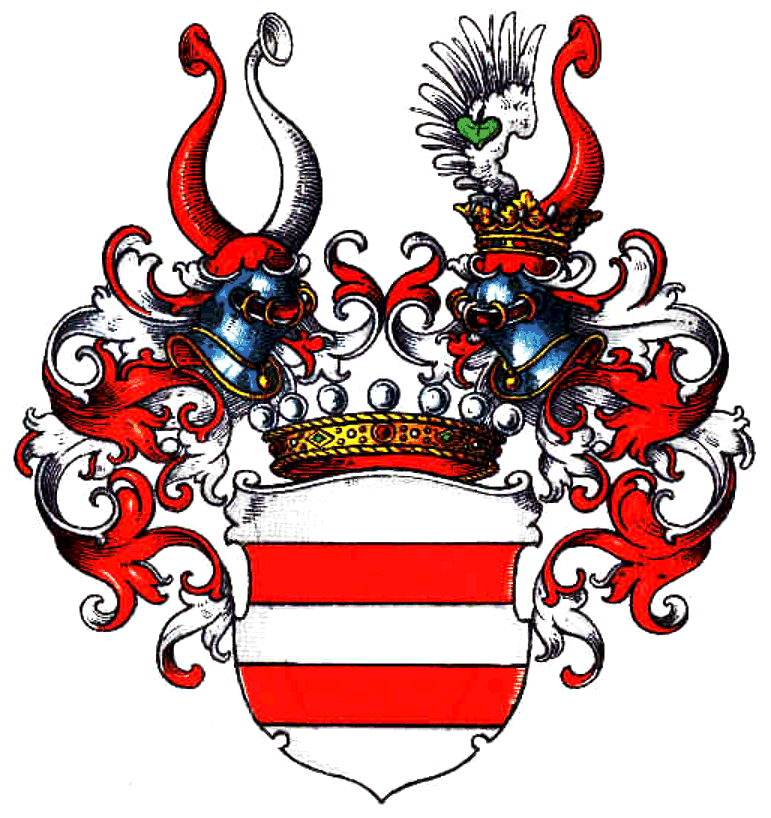
Coat of arms of the Freiherr von Reibnitz (1901)

Reibnitz was born into the Reibnitz family, an ancient Uradel Silesian noble family of landowners in the service of the Dukes of Silesia, whose family seat was Burg Läusepelz. The family was first recorded in a written document from 1288 with Henricus de Rybnicz mentioned as a witness. Günther was the youngest son of Baron (Freiherr) Hans Egon Friedrich Wilhelm von Reibnitz (1856–1918), who, on 19 February 1887 had married Baroness Ida Nadejda Antonie Julie Marie Eugenie Wilhelmine Friederike von Eickstedt (1867–1937), a member of the Eickstedt family, in Gieraltowitz, Upper Silesia. Reibnitz was born on 8 September 1894 at Mistitz in the Prussian province of Silesia, now called Miejsce Odrzańskie, having since become part of Poland. He was educated at the Royal Prussian Military Academy at Berlin-Lichterfelde, from which he graduated at the end of 1913.

In March 1914, Reibnitz was commissioned as an ensign into the Grand Duchy of Mecklenburg 2nd Regiment of Dragoons, No. 18, in Parchim. In August 1914, soon after the beginning of the First World War he was severely wounded and captured, remaining a prisoner of war of the French for most of the duration of the war. On 20 September 1918, shortly before Reibnitz was released in exchange for a French officer, his father died in Berlin.

== After First World War ==
After the war, in the lead-up to the 1921 Upper Silesia plebiscite to resolve competing German and Polish territorial claims in Upper Silesia, Reibnitz and his brother Joachim founded two regiments of German irregulars, or Freikorps, aiming to guard the border on the River Oder from Cosel to Ratibor.

== First marriage ==
On 12 Jul 1921, Reibnitz married firstly Margherita Gräfin von Seherr-Thoss (1894–1962), the widow of Friedrich Ernst Graf von Seherr-Thoss (1881–1918), and a daughter of Gustav Schön by his marriage to Elisabeth Wentzel. Thereafter, he took over the management of the estate of Langlieben in Upper Silesia, which she inherited from her mother. Their daughter Margarita was born there on 18 January 1924. After separating from his wife, Reibnitz established a farm at Hahnenvorwerk, near Silverberg in Silesia, breeding animals for the fur trade. In 1933, this activity ended when he was appointed to the honorary position of Regional Director of Hunting for Silesia. On 1 December 1930 Reibnitz joined the Nazi Party, becoming member number 412855. On 15 April 1933 he then became a member of the Cavalry SS, with the SS number 66010.

Reibnitz and his first wife were divorced at Breslau on 15 April 1931. On 15 July 1937, his mother died at Groß-Grauden, Silesia, now Grudynia Wielka in Poland. His only daughter out of this marriage Margarita Maria Elisabeth Agathe Alice Freiin von Reibnitz (1924–2012) married Charles Jacques Francisco (b. 1925), with whom she owned a small farm on the outskirts of Industry, Illinois, where they raised breeder cows and various other animals. They had two sons, Charles Francisco and Christopher Francisco, both born and raised in the United States.

== Second World War ==
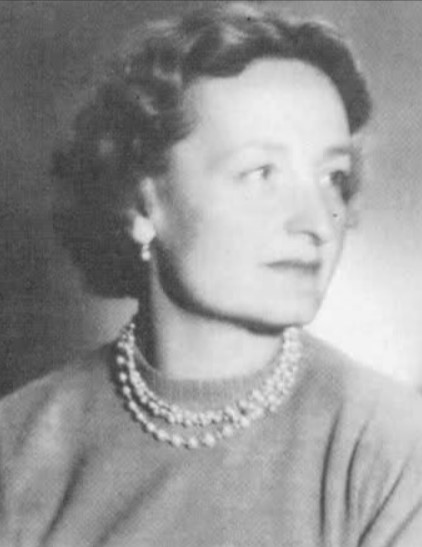
Günther's second wife, Countess Marianne Szapary

As an officer of the Army Reserve, Reibnitz was recalled to active service at the beginning of the Second World War. However, he was not a very loyal party member. In 1937 he had been summoned to appear before the highest party tribunal accused of denigrating the swastika flag. By reaffirming his loyalty, he was able to extract himself from the affair; he had also referred to the leader of the SS, Heinrich Himmler, as the "chicken farmer". Soon after he rejoined the armed forces on active service, Reibnitz was sent back to the home front due to heart problems. He informed the SS of his marriage (on 17 December 1941 in Breslau) to his second wife Countess Maria Anna Szapáry von Muraszombath, Széchysziget et Szapár (1911–1988), a daughter of the Austro-Hungarian diplomat Count Frigyes Szapáry (1869–1935), but he did not inform them of his intention to seek an annulment of his first marriage so that he could marry his second wife in a Roman Catholic ceremony, nor that the children of the marriage would be raised in that faith. This was interpreted by the regime as disloyalty. It was also seen as incriminating that he and his wife practiced their faith openly. Because his wife was already under observation by the Gestapo over her contacts before the war with supposed British Secret Service agents, as well as in connection with a range of essentially minor "transgressions", his situation became increasingly critical, and in 1944 he was dismissed from the Nazi Party, from the Cavalry SS, and from the post of Regional Director of Hunting for Silesia. On 16 November 1942, Reibnitz's son Friedrich was born in Breslau, and on 15 January 1945 his daughter Marie Christine (later Princess Michael of Kent) was born in Karlsbad (now Karlovy Vary in the Czech Republic), near the estate of her maternal grandmother Princess Hedwig of Windisch-Graetz (1878–1918), a daughter of Alfred III, Prince of Windisch-Grätz, 11th Minister-President of Austria. Friedrich (born 16 November 1942) is married to Helen Rodda Williams, the eldest of five daughters of academics Sir Bruce Rodda Williams and his wife, Roma Olive Hotten (1916-1992). They have one daughter, Anna Helen Theresa Freiin von Reibnitz, born in 1986.

== After the Second World War ==
In the confusion towards the end of the war, Reibnitz managed to avoid being transferred, on the personal orders of Himmler, to the SS-Sturmbrigade Dirlewanger, and was able to find refuge with his old army regiment.

In May 1945, following the war's end, Reibnitz avoided captivity by Soviet forces and made his way to Bavaria. There he was detained by the US military, investigated and was eventually classified by the Appeals Tribunal for Upper Bavaria (14 May 1948) as a "nominal party member", "not a member of any organization condemned as criminal in the Nuremberg judgment" and "equivalent to a non-accused person".

Reibnitz's second marriage ended in divorce in 1946. In 1950 his former wife moved with her children to Australia. Reibnitz lived first in Munich, where he worked in the fur trade and then in insurance. In 1950 he moved to South Africa to open his own insurance business.

== Later marriages ==
On 12 May 1950 in Johannesburg Reibnitz married Esther Schütte (born 1909). The marriage ended in divorce on 12 July 1956 in Pretoria, after a visit to Mozambique. On 15 December 1956, in Umtali, Southern Rhodesia, Reibnitz's fourth marriage was to Rosemarie von Buddenbrock (1907–1999), the widow of Baron Gustav von Buddenbrock (1907–1955) and before that of Ulrich Otto Hoesch (1899–1941). She was a daughter of Alois Karl Kramer. Reibnitz lived with his last wife on her farm at Maforga. As the widow of Gustav von Buddenbrock, his wife is called Baroness Rosemarie von Buddenbrock in some sources.

== 1976 retirement ==
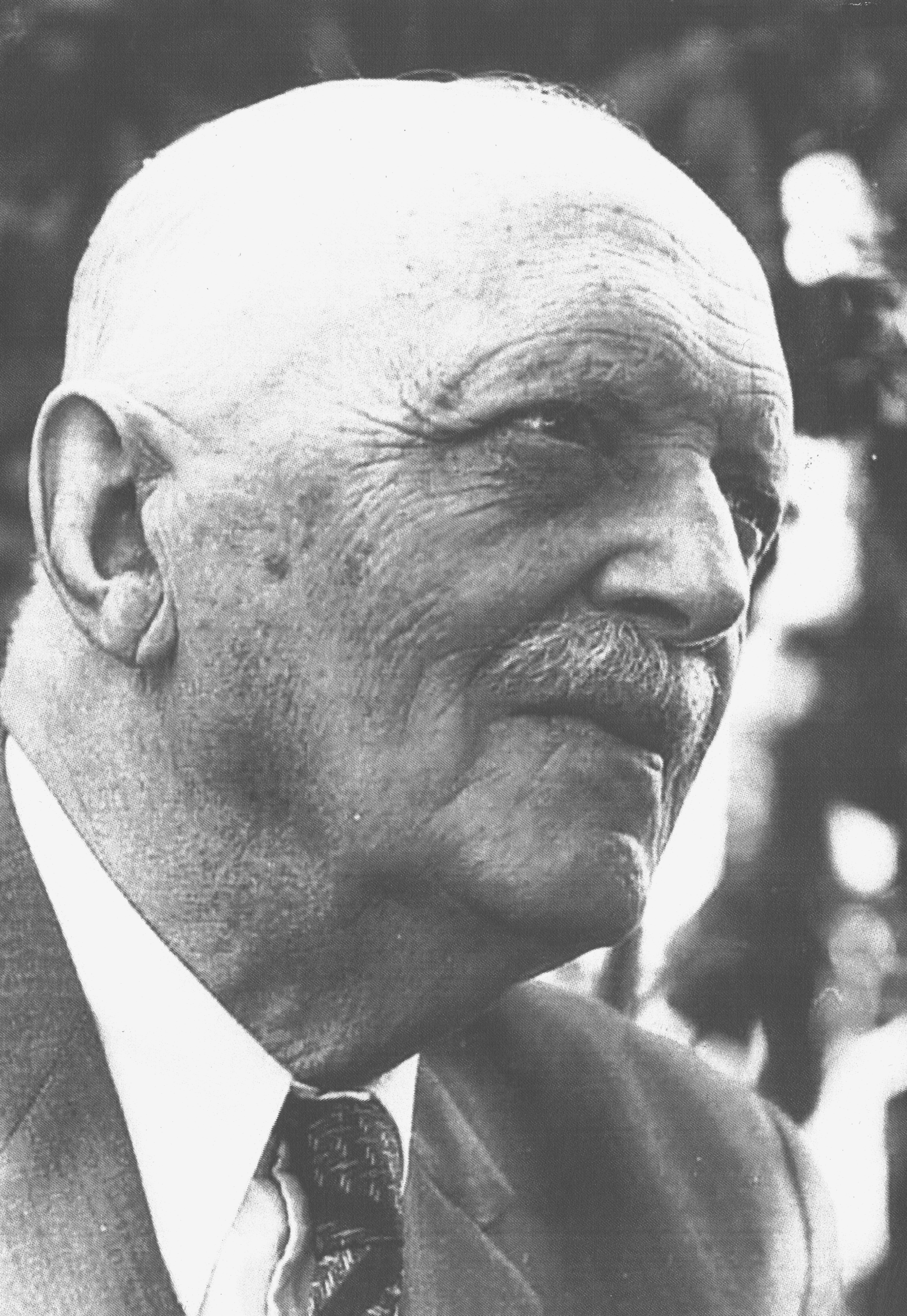
Günther Hubertus Freiherr von Reibnitz (1970)

In 1976, Reibnitz retired to Germany, while his wife travelled between Germany and Mozambique and continued to manage the farm. He spent his old age in Hemmingen and died on 2 March 1983 in Breitbrunn am Chiemsee in Bavaria. His grave is in Garmisch-Partenkirchen. In 1986 his widow returned to Germany on health grounds and gave the farm to neighbouring Christian missionaries. She died on 30 November 1999 in Marquartstein, Bavaria. Maforga continues to this day as a mission.

Margarita, Reibnitz's daughter from his first marriage, married Charles Jacques Francisco in Sharon, Connecticut, on 14 September 1947.

On 30 June 1978 in Vienna, Reibnitz had attended the civil wedding of his daughter Marie Christine to Prince Michael of Kent. He became the grandfather of Lord Frederick Windsor (born in 1979) and Lady Gabriella Windsor (born in 1981). On 30 June 1979 in Sydney, Reibnitz's only son Frederick married secondly Helen Rodda Williams, daughter of Sir Bruce Rodda Williams KBE, Professor and Vice-Chancellor of the University of Sydney.

== Nazism ==
In 1985 details became public for the first time concerning Reibnitz's role at the time of Nazism. A biography of Elizabeth II by John Parker states that by the end of the Second World War, the Berlin Documents Centre had held a dossier on Reibnitz said to be four inches thick. Writer Barry Everingham stated that "historians at the Yad Vashem Institute in Jerusalem claimed that the baron was planted in the SS to act as Goering's spy". However, Everingham's source for this has been questioned.

== Death ==
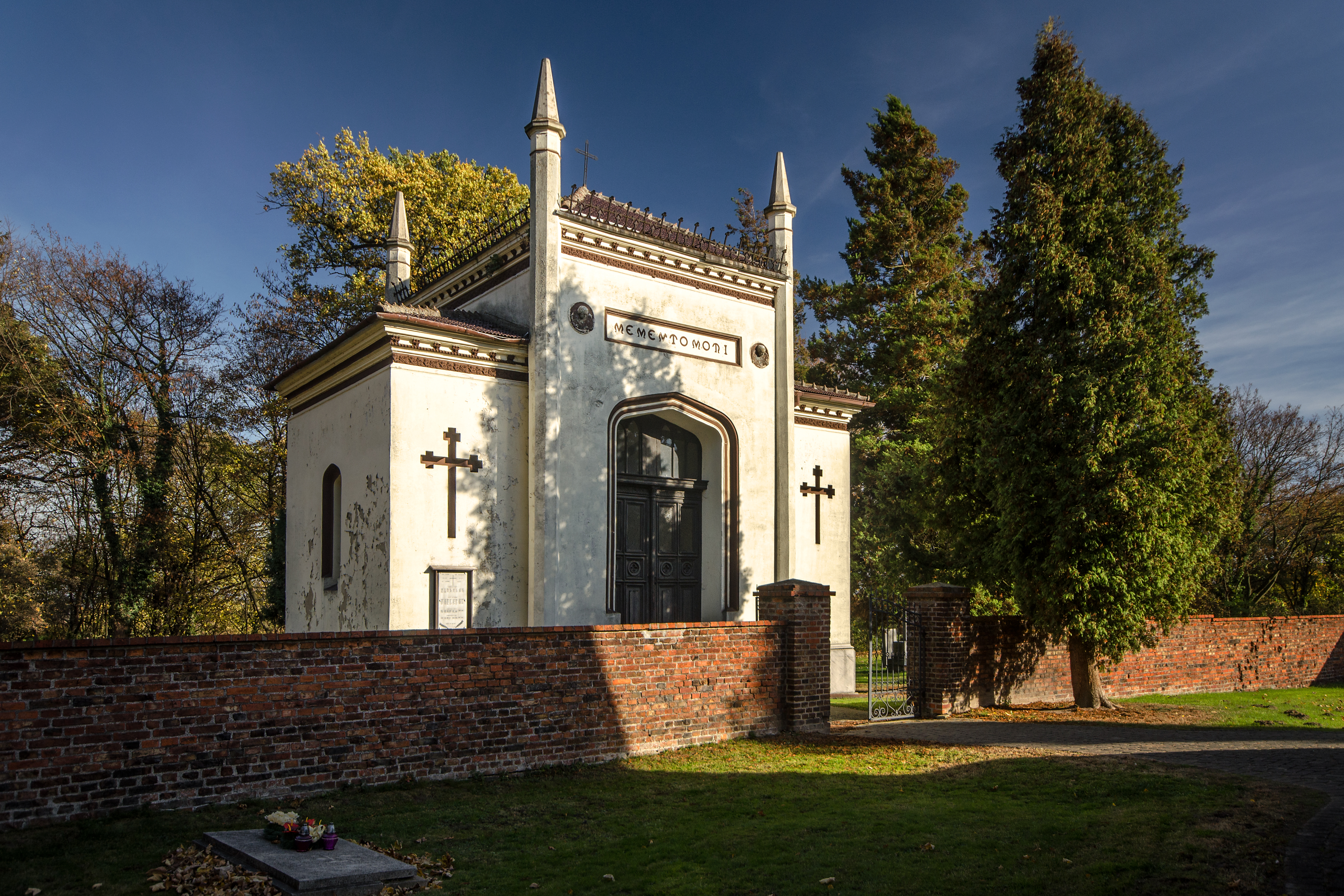
Mausoleum of the Reibnitz family in Mistitz, Poland

Günther-Hubertus Freiherr von Reibnitz died on 12 March 1983 in Breitbrunn am Chiemsee, Rosenheim. He was buried in Stadtfriedhof Partenkirchen, Garmisch-Partenkirchen, Bavaria, Germany.
