= Bruce Williams (vice-chancellor) =

Australian academic and vice-chancellor of the University of Sydney

Sir Bruce Williams KBE FASSA
- Born: 10 January 1919; Warragul, Victoria, Australia
- Died: 9 August 2010 (aged 91); Sydney, New South Wales, Australia
- Spouse: Roma Olive Hotten
- Children: Helen Rodda Williams

Sir Bruce Rodda Williams KBE FASSA, (10 January 1919 – 9 August 2010) was an Australian academic and vice-chancellor of the University of Sydney.

== Early life ==
Williams was born on 10 January 1919 in Warragul, Victoria, Australia as the youngest child of Rev. William James Williams, Methodist minister (1884–1956) and his wife Helen Sarah Williams, née Baud (1885–1967).

== Education ==
William was a student at Wesley College and the University of Melbourne.

== Career ==
In 1940 Williams joined the faculty of the University of Adelaide. Then in 1946 he joined the faculty of Queen's University Belfast. He joined Keele University In 1950, as professor of economics.

From 1959 Williams was at the University of Manchester, as Robert Otley Professor of Economics, 1959–63, and then Stanley Jevons Professor of Political Economy, 1963–67. He was appointed as vice-chancellor of the University of Sydney in 1967, and retired in 1981.

In 1982, Williams delivered the annual series of Australian Broadcasting Corporation Boyer Lectures on "Living With Technology".

== Marriage and issue ==
On 27 July 1942, Williams was married to Roma Olive Hotten (1916–1992) and they had five daughters. His eldest daughter Helen (b. 1945) is married to Friedrich Freiherr von Reibnitz (b. 1942), the only son of Günther Hubertus Freiherr von Reibnitz and his second wife, Countess Maria Anna Szapáry von Muraszombath, Széchysziget et Szapár (1911–1998). Friedrich is also an elder brother of Princess Michael of Kent.

Sir Bruce Rodda Williams died on 9 August 2010.

== Honours and awards ==
- 1968 Elected Fellow of the Academy of the Social Sciences in Australia
- 1980 Knight Commander of the Order of the British Empire for "Services to education & to government"
