= Dot Edis =

Twentieth century Australian nurse

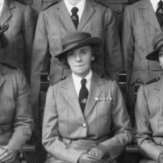
- Born: Margaret Dorothy Edis; April 19, 1890; Kyabram
- Died: August 14, 1981 (aged 91); Subiaco
- Occupation: nurse
- Children: Reginald (adopted)

Margaret Dorothy "Dot" Edis MBE (April 19, 1890 – August 14, 1981) was an Australian nurse who served in both World Wars. In 1965 she received the Red Cross's Florence Nightingale medal.

== Life ==
Edis was born in Kyabram in 1890.

She completed her initial training as a nurse at the end of 1914 in Kalgoorlie Hospital. In the following August she joined the Australian Army Nursing Service as a Staff Nurse before being sent as part of the Australian Imperial Force to an auxiliary hospital in Egypt. By April 1916 she was on the Western Front where she worked at the 2nd Australian Casualty Clearing Station as well as both American and British hospitals caring for the wounded soldiers. She left the Australian Imperial Force in 1919 with the rank of sister, but she continued to care for soldiers who had returned from the war for the next five years.

In the 1930s Edis began working for Head Matron Marion Walsh at the King Edward Memorial Hospital for Women. She took further training in child care and midwifery. Walsh made her responsible for the post-natal ward and she became so enamoured with a baby, who was under developed, that she adopted Reginald as her own child.

In May 1940 she and her nurses of the 2/3rd Australian General Hospital were in Perth awaiting to go abroad. In a group photograph she is seen wearing her medals.

In 1948 she became the matron of a nursing home which had been called the "Home of Peace for the Dying and Incurable" when it was established in 1902 in the suburb of Perth called Subiaco. Edis declared the home to be unacceptable and she made an ultimatum to the management. Changes happened and she stayed for another eighteen years.

Edis was honoured in 1954 when she was made an MBE and in 1965 she received the Red Cross's Florence Nightingale Medal.

She died in Subiaco at the Home of Peace in 1981.
