= Agnes Marion McLean Walsh =

Australian midwife (1884–1967)

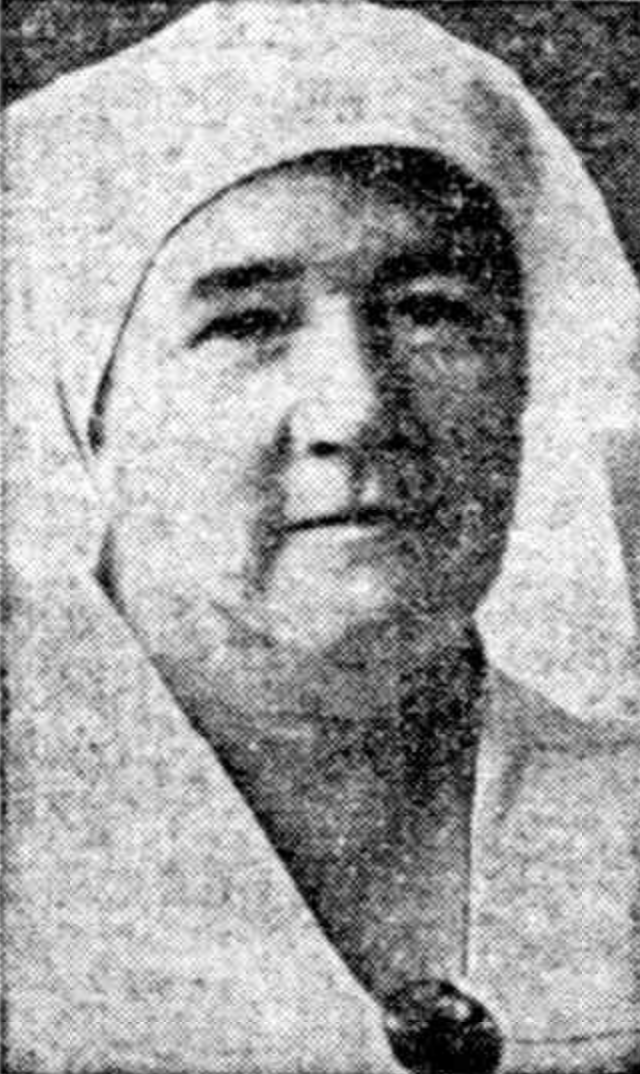
- Born: 10 June 1890; Dungog

Agnes Marion McLean Walsh OBE (née Gibson; 10 June 1884 – 12 August 1967) was head matron of King Edward Memorial Hospital, a Western Australian maternity hospital from 1922 until her retirement in December 1954, during which time more than 60,000 babies were born under her supervision. In that capacity she advised the Commonwealth Government on midwifery policy and was on the National Medical Research Council.

In the 1930s Dot Edis was working for her at the King Edward Memorial Hospital after taking further training in child care and midwifery there. Walsh made her responsible for the post-natal ward and she became so enamoured with a baby, who was under developed, that she adopted Reginald as her own child. Edis was to go on have a leading career in nursing.

In the 1949 New Year Honours Walsh was made an Officer of the British Empire (OBE) and received her award at Government House, Perth in July of the same year.

The Agnes Walsh Nurses’ Home was opened by the West Australian Minister for Health, Dame Florence Cardell-Oliver in January 1953.
