= Allan Bryce =

Australian rules footballer, born 1905

Personal information
- Full name: Allan MacIntyre Bryce
- Born: 30 August 1905; Kyabram, Victoria
- Died: 16 November 1964 (aged 59); South Yarra, Victoria
- Original team: Mentone
- Height: 183 cm (6 ft 0 in)
- Weight: 82 kg (181 lb)

Playing career^{1}
| Years | Club | Games (Goals) |
| 1927 | St Kilda | 2 (0) |
- ^{1} Playing statistics correct to the end of 1927.

Allan Bryce (30 August 1905 - 16 November 1964) was an Australian rules footballer who played for the St Kilda Football Club in the Victorian Football League (VFL).
