= Kyabram Fauna Park =

Fauna park in Victoria, Australia

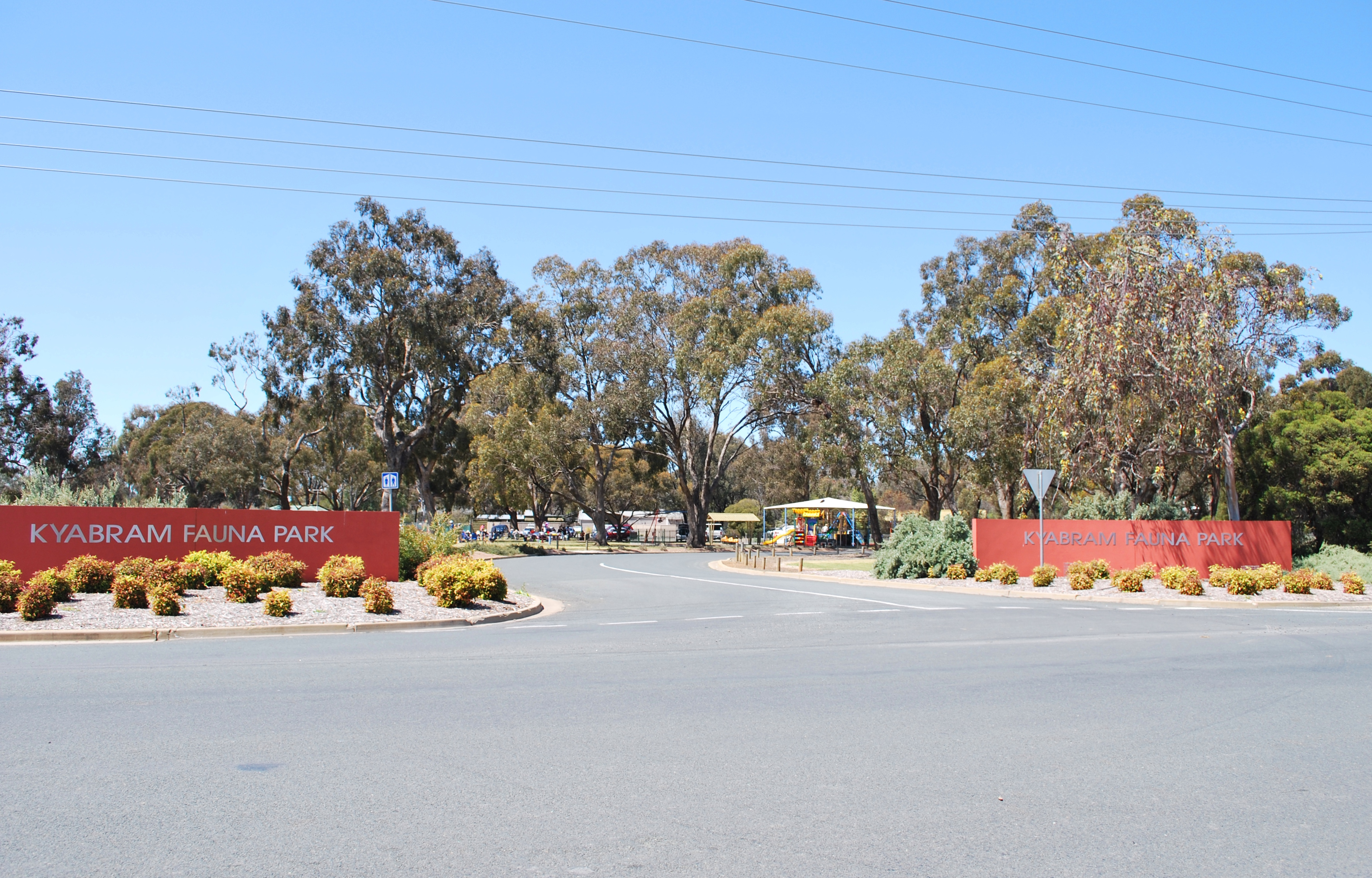
- Entrance
- Interactive map of Kyabram Fauna Park
- 36°19′27″S 145°2′56″E
- Date opened: 1976
- Location: Kyabram, Victoria, Australia
- Land area: 55 ha (140 acres)
- No. of animals: 400
- Website: www.zoo.org.au/kyabram

The Kyabram Fauna Park is a 55-hectare (140-acre) fauna park in Kyabram, Victoria, Australia.

== History ==
Until 1967, the current site of the Kyabram Fauna Park was fallow farmland that had been abandoned for some years. In 1967, the need to utilise this piece of land was voiced during Kyabram's public meetings. The land had sat unused for 80 years and there was a general consensus on the need to improve and use it. A portion of the land served as a run-off site for rainwater. It was during this time that the idea to use the land as a wildlife park emerged. The proposal was accepted and work began on building the Kyabram Fauna Park.

Launched as a non-profit venture in 1976, the park is a sanctuary to over 400 species of animals who can all be viewed and many interacted with. The fauna park offers a walk through aviary and a heated reptile house containing snakes, lizards (such as lace monitors) and freshwater crocodiles. Other animals in the park include alpine dingoes, flying foxes, echidnas, Tasmanian devils, quolls, wombats, koalas, sugar gliders, kangaroos, parma wallabies, emus, cassowaries, wedge-tailed eagles, cockatoos and Cape Barren geese. In 2022 the park received its first exotic residents, meerkats, which while native to Africa rather than Australia, have become popular with visitors. In 2023 amongst the snake species in the newly opened reptile house was a reticulated python from Asia.

The park is home to the cottage that French adventurer, navyman, and soldier Theodore Hazleman built in 1867. Hazleman, before settling in the area, sailed the seas as a cabin boy and survived the American Civil War. In Kyabram he set up as a wheat farmer and fathered 13 children.

In July 2022, Kyabram Fauna Park joined Zoos Victoria as its fourth official zoo.
