= Amanda Burton (netball) =

Australian netball player

Personal information
- Born: 23 March 1980 (age 46)
- Height: 1.84 m (6 ft 0 in)

Netball career
- Playing positions: GS, GA
Years	Club team	Apps
2000–2004	Melbourne Kestrels	
- Updated on 2009-03-12

Amanda Burton (born 23 March 1980) is an Australian netball player.

She was a key forward for the Melbourne Kestrels from 2000 to 2004, playing in the positions of goal attack and goal shooter, and often working in tandem with international Cynna Kydd. Though she formed an effective pairing with Neele and was a frequent member of both the national league side and state team for five years, Burton found that the low-paying sport was too much of a strain on her off-field career, and retired at the end of the 2004 season, at the age of only 24.

Burton's untimely retirement was a motivating factor in the 2005 decision of most national league players to join the Australian Workers' Union in an attempt to improve player wages. Having retired from elite netball, she now concentrates on her prior career as a pharmacy sales representative.
