= Miejsce Odrzańskie =

Miejsce Odrzańskie Mistitz
- Village
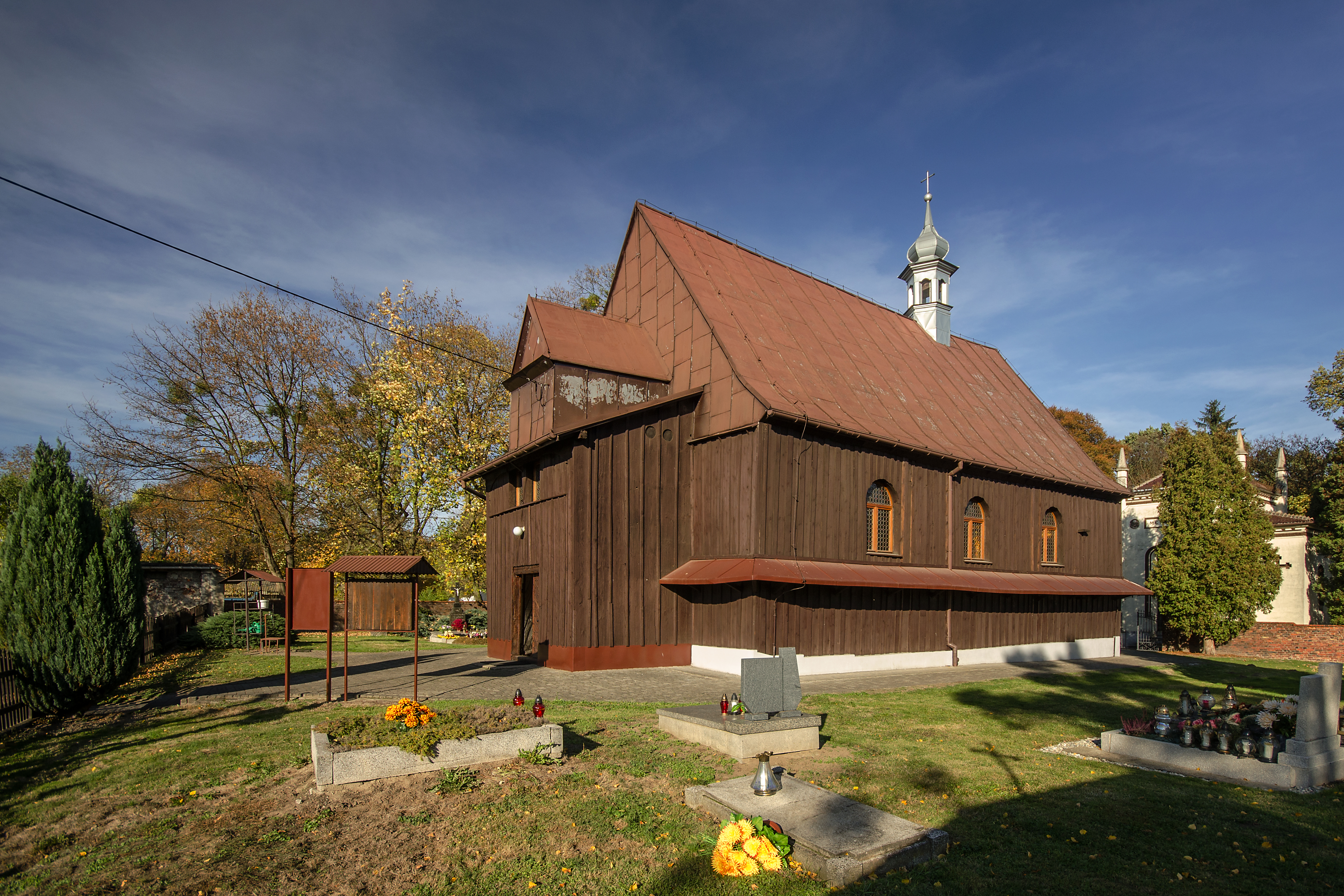
- Church of the Holy Trinity

- Location within Poland
- Coordinates: 50°11′44″N 18°13′12″E
- Country: Poland
- Voivodeship: Opole
- County: Kędzierzyn-Koźle
- Gmina: Cisek

Population
  - Total: 328
- Postal code: 47-253

Miejsce Odrzańskie ([ˈmjɛi̯st͡sɛ ɔˈdʐaɲskʲɛ], additional name in German: Mistitz) is a village in the administrative district of Gmina Cisek, within Kędzierzyn-Koźle County, Opole Voivodeship, in southern Poland.

== Notable people ==
- Günther von Reibnitz (1894–1983), German military officer

== Sex asymmetry ==
It became famous since it hasn't had single male newborns for almost a decade. Despite that, a variety of scientists said it is just a coincidence, helped by the particular birth rate of the village being lower than 1 birth per year.

== See also ==
- Holy Trinity Church, Miejsce Odrzańskie
