= Kyabram P-12 College =

Public school in Victoria, Australia

Coordinates: 36°19′03″S 145°03′16″E

Kyabram P–12 College

Location
- 57 Fischer Street; Kyabram, Victoria; Australia

Information
- Type: Public school
- Established: 1956
- Principal: Marina Walsh
- Website: kyabramp-12.vic.edu.au

Kyabram P–12 College, previously, "Kyabram High School" and later "Kyabram Secondary College" is a small high school in the country town of Kyabram, Victoria, Australia. The school has around 1200 students attending from a 20 km radius around Kyabram. The school was built in 1956. There are 127 working staff at the school.

The previously known "Ky High" was joined with merged with primary schools (Haslem St Primary and Dawes Rd Primary) in the region in early 2009, making up Kyabram P–12 College.

== History ==
Past principals
1947–1949 J Wilson
1949–1962 P Alexander
1962–1963 E.J Daniels
1963–1981 W.A Kunhe
1981–1982 Pat Anderson
1982–1986 Ray Muller
1986–1988 Ray Willis
1988–1989 Michael Francis
1989–1997 Brian King
1997–2009 Lindsay Cooper
2009–2019 Stuart Bott
2019–2023 Paul Tozer
2024-present Marina Walsh

== Houses ==
The students at the school compete in various events, such as the annual Swimming Sports and Sports Carnival, under the banner of their respective houses which were inspired by the previous colour theme which was abolished.

- Castles
- Pine Grove
- Allan

== See also ==
- List of schools in Victoria
- Victorian Certificate of Education
