= Kyabram =

- Town
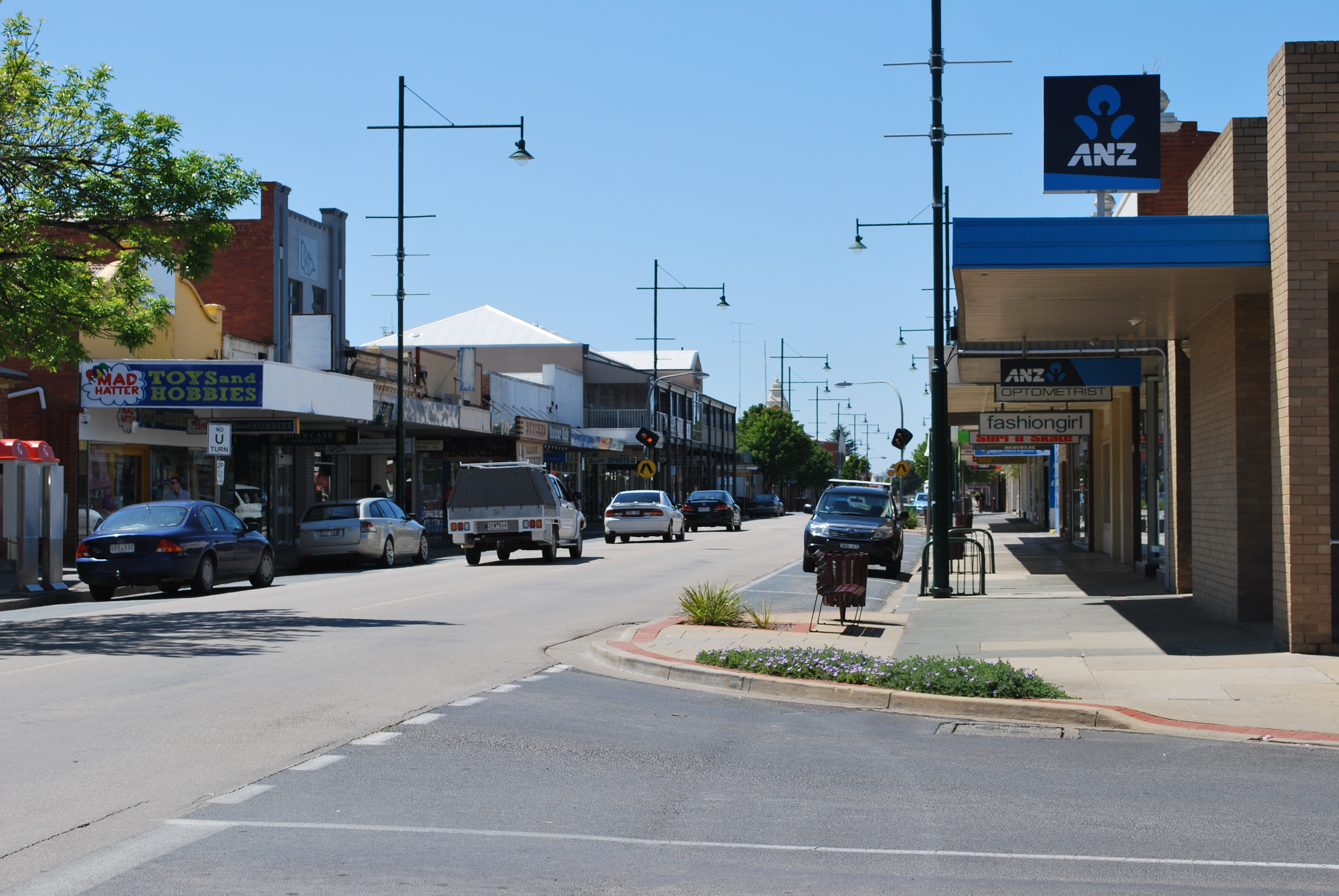
- Allan Street, the main street of Kyabram

- Interactive map of Kyabram
- Coordinates: 36°19′0″S 145°03′0″E
- Country: Australia
- State: Victoria
- Region: Hume
- LGAs: Shire of Campaspe; City of Greater Shepparton
- Location: 198 km (123 mi) from Melbourne; 40 km (25 mi) from Shepparton; 44 km (27 mi) from Echuca
- Established: 1876

Government
  - State electorate: Murray Plains
  - Federal division: Nicholls
- Elevation: 104.5 m (343 ft)

Population
  - Total: 7,543 (2021 Census)
- Postcode: 3620
- Mean max temp: 21.8 °C (71.2 °F)
- Mean min temp: 8.7 °C (47.7 °F)
- Annual rainfall: 451.7 mm (17.78 in)
Localities around Kyabram
Kyvalley	Wyuna	Undera
Timmering	Kyabram	Lancaster
Girgarre	Kyabram South	Merrigum

Kyabram (/kaɪˈæbrəm/) is a town in north central Victoria, Australia. Kyabram is located in the centre of a rich irrigation district in the Goulburn River Valley, 200 kilometres (120 mi) north of Melbourne. The name of the town is thought to derive from a Bangerang word 'Kiambram' meaning 'thick forest'.

It is the second-largest town in the Shire of Campaspe, situated between the towns of Echuca and Shepparton and is close to the Murray River, Goulburn River, Campaspe River and Waranga Basin. As of the 2021 census the town had a population of 7,416 people and provides services to a district population of around 16,000. Surrounding smaller towns include Merrigum, Lancaster, Undera, Cooma, Wyuna, Kyvalley, Girgarre, Stanhope and Tongala.

== History ==
The Pangerang people (also spelled Bangerang) are the original inhabitants of the Goulburn Valley area.

Settlement of the township began in the 1870s with the first sale of town blocks held in 1876. Kyabram Post Office opened on 23 September 1878. Sheridan Post Office opened on 1 December 1884. On 8 April 1886, in anticipation of the arrival of the railway at what was then Sheridan, Kyabram was renamed Kyabram East and Sheridan was renamed Kyabram. The Kyabram Mechanics' Institute was built in 1891.

John Allan, who lived in Kyabram from 1873, became Premier of Victoria in 1924 and was Australia's first Country Party premier. Allan was associated with the Kyabram Reform Movement, a conservative political organisation formed at the start of the 20th century and led by Benjamin Goddard, a local businessman. The movement's campaign played a significant role in the downfall of the Peacock state government in June 1902 and its sound defeat in the subsequent October election. The incoming Irvine government substantially reduced the number of state parliamentarians, a key demand of the movement.

Kyabram was formally proclaimed a town on 4 July 1973.

The Kyabram Magistrates' Court closed on 1 January 1990.

== Climate ==
Kyabram has a semi-arid-influenced humid subtropcial climate (Köppen: Cfa), with warm to hot, dry summers and cool, rather cloudy winters. Mean maximum temperatures vary from 30.5 °C (86.9 °F) in January to 13.2 °C (55.8 °F) in July, and mean minima range from 14.9 °C (58.8 °F) in February to 3.1 °C (37.6 °F) in July.

Annual rainfall is rather low, averaging 451.7 mm (17.78 in), and is spread across 104.6 rainy days. The town experiences 110.1 clear days and 91.9 cloudy days per annum. Extreme temperatures have ranged from 47.1 °C (116.8 °F) on 25 January 2019 to −7.5 °C (18.5 °F) on 21 July 1982.

Climate data for Kyabram (36.34°S 145.06°E, 105 m AMSL) (1964–2024)
Month	Jan	Feb	Mar	Apr	May	Jun	Jul	Aug	Sep	Oct	Nov	Dec	Year
Record high °C (°F)	47.1 (116.8)	46.6 (115.9)	40.4 (104.7)	36.6 (97.9)	26.7 (80.1)	21.4 (70.5)	23.1 (73.6)	26.6 (79.9)	33.9 (93.0)	36.4 (97.5)	43.6 (110.5)	45.3 (113.5)	47.1 (116.8)
Mean daily maximum °C (°F)	30.5 (86.9)	30.1 (86.2)	26.8 (80.2)	21.9 (71.4)	17.3 (63.1)	14.0 (57.2)	13.2 (55.8)	14.9 (58.8)	17.7 (63.9)	21.6 (70.9)	25.3 (77.5)	28.4 (83.1)	21.8 (71.3)
Mean daily minimum °C (°F)	14.7 (58.5)	14.9 (58.8)	12.6 (54.7)	8.8 (47.8)	6.1 (43.0)	3.9 (39.0)	3.1 (37.6)	3.8 (38.8)	5.3 (41.5)	7.6 (45.7)	10.4 (50.7)	12.7 (54.9)	8.7 (47.6)
Record low °C (°F)	5.0 (41.0)	5.6 (42.1)	3.7 (38.7)	−1.5 (29.3)	−2.7 (27.1)	−5.0 (23.0)	−7.5 (18.5)	−5.7 (21.7)	−3.1 (26.4)	−1.7 (28.9)	1.0 (33.8)	3.7 (38.7)	−7.5 (18.5)
Average precipitation mm (inches)	36.7 (1.44)	26.2 (1.03)	30.1 (1.19)	38.1 (1.50)	41.7 (1.64)	41.0 (1.61)	41.7 (1.64)	42.0 (1.65)	41.3 (1.63)	42.1 (1.66)	37.0 (1.46)	34.1 (1.34)	451.7 (17.78)
Average precipitation days (≥ 0.2 mm)	5.0	4.1	5.1	6.4	10.0	12.5	14.4	13.3	11.1	8.9	7.5	6.3	104.6
Average afternoon relative humidity (%)	34	36	39	48	60	68	67	61	56	47	39	35	49
Average dew point °C (°F)	9.8 (49.6)	10.7 (51.3)	9.7 (49.5)	8.5 (47.3)	8.2 (46.8)	7.0 (44.6)	6.2 (43.2)	6.1 (43.0)	6.9 (44.4)	7.3 (45.1)	7.5 (45.5)	8.0 (46.4)	8.0 (46.4)
Mean monthly sunshine hours	303.8	274.0	263.5	213.0	161.2	135.0	136.4	161.2	195.0	238.7	270.0	306.9	2,658.7
Percentage possible sunshine	68	72	69	64	51	46	44	48	55	59	64	68	59
Source: Bureau of Meteorology

== Economy ==
The district is dependent on the primary industries of dairying and fruit orchards. Henry Jones, operate a plant in the town, manufacturing Taylor's branded sauces. Goulburn Valley Creamery, operates out of the same site and produces frozen milk concentrates for export. The town provides engineering, financial advisors, solicitors and accounting services to the district as well as cold storage and specialist dairy services. Kyabram also boasts a family owned Camel dairy unique to Australia. Southern Processing Ltd and Fonterra (Stanhope) also have food processing plants nearby. Kyabram is home to the Kyabram Fauna Park.

== Facilities ==
Medical and aged care services in the town include a 46-bed hospital, a 30-bed home for the aged, infant welfare centre, ambulance station, several doctors, 3-dental clinics, podiatry clinic and other health practitioners. A residential drug and alcohol rehab. Kyabram also has 2 ovals (Northern Oval Sports Reserve and Kyabram Recreation Reserve), A local police station and volunteer CFA station.

== Education ==
Kyabram has combined three state schools (Kyabram Secondary College, Dawes Rd (Demolished) and Haslem St Primary Schools) to one P-12 school containing three campuses (Dawes, Haslem and Fisher). Kyabram also has a Catholic primary and secondary school (St Augustine's College), two kindergartens and the Kyabram Community & Learning Centre providing community services and adult learning opportunities for the people of Kyabram and the surrounding region.

Kyabram also has their own "Blue Light" for young people. Kyabram Blue Light was headed up by Senior Constable Mitchell Bull, who was named Campaspe Shire's Citizen of the Year 2022.

== Media ==
The local newspaper is called the Kyabram Free Press, a part of the McPherson media group in the region, with a circulation of roughly 3,300 copies

In Kath & Kim, Episode 3 (The Moon) Kath and Kel win a mystery flight to Kyabram due to Kim running up Kath's credit card. Although Kath is excited, claiming "I love Kyabram!" unfortunately the couple never makes it there due to flight delays.

== Attractions ==
Attractions include the Kyabram Fauna Park (now part of zoo's Victoria), a 55-hectare (140-acre) reserve housing five hundred species of wildlife. There are free-roaming kangaroos and emus, hides to observe a variety of water birds and a new splash water park.

Kyabram holds the annual Bush Market festival in the month of November where Allan Street is closed down and the local businesses extend their hours of availability. During the festival the locals enjoy pop up marquees, food, wine, beer, and live music.

== Sport ==
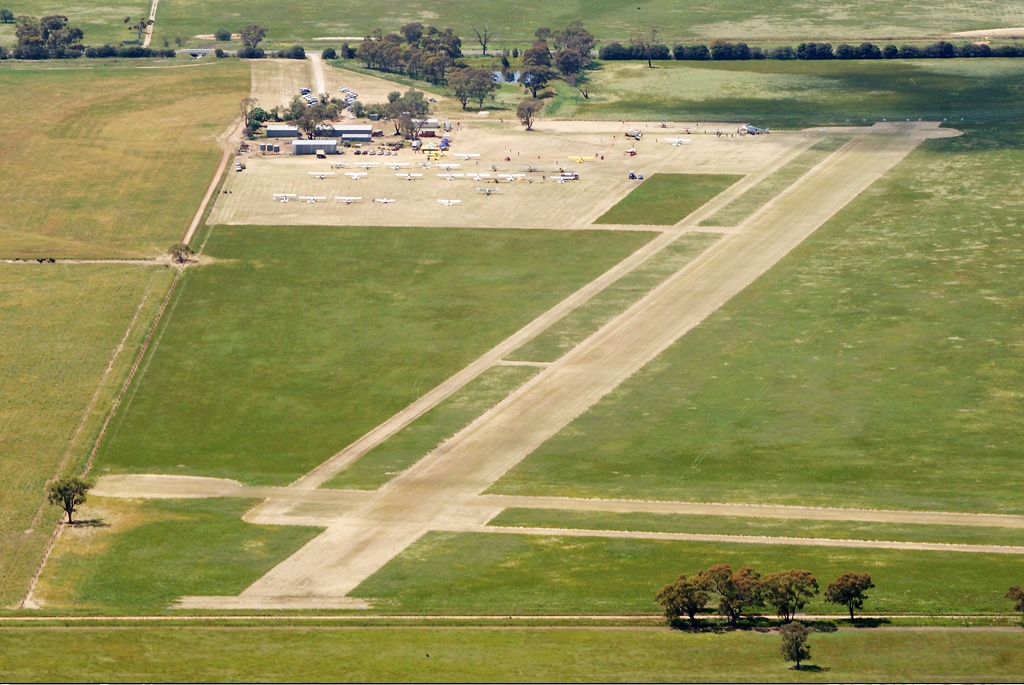
Kyabram Airfield, 2010

Popular sports in Kyabram include Australian rules football and cricket. The local football team is known as the Bombers and competes in the Goulburn Valley Football Netball League. Netball and soccer are also popular in Kyabram.

horse harness racers, race and practice at the Kyabram Racecourse.

Golfers play at the Kyabram Valley View Golf and Bowls Club on Curr Road, Mount Scobie, or at the Kyabram Parkland Golf Club, the home of the Victorian Par 3 Amateur Championships, on Racecourse Road.

== Notable residents ==
- John Allan - Premier of Victoria (1924-1927), Australia's first Country Party premier.
- Felice Arena – author
- Dulcie Boling – magazine editor
- Molly Meldrum - Australian music critic, journalist, record producer and musical entrepreneur
- Allan Bryce – Australian rules footballer
- Julia Crockett-Grills – Australian rules footballer and Kyabram's first AFL Women's player
- Brett Deledio – Australian rules footballer
- Dot Edis – decorated nurse.
- Richard Farleigh – financial investor
- Jim Higgs – cricketer
- Nick Holman – Australian rules footballer
- Cynna Kydd – netball player
- Joe Langtry – Federal Member of Parliament for the Division of Riverina (1940-1949)
- Garry Lyon – Australian rules footballer
- Joe Matera – musician
- Tom McCluskey – Australian rules footballer
- Russell McDonald – Member of Victorian Legislative Assembly for the District of Rodney (1964-1973)
- Hugh McKenzie – Member of Victorian Legislative Assembly for the District of Rodney (1904-1917)
- Declan O'Rourke - Irish singer-songwriter who resided in Kyabram in his childhood, and whose debut album is titled Since Kyabram.
- Kayne Pettifer – Australian rules footballer
- Hugh Edward Ryan – priest
- Allan Salisbury – cartoonist
- Arch Shields – Australian rules footballer
- Barrie Vagg – Australian rules footballer
