= Sławików =

- Village
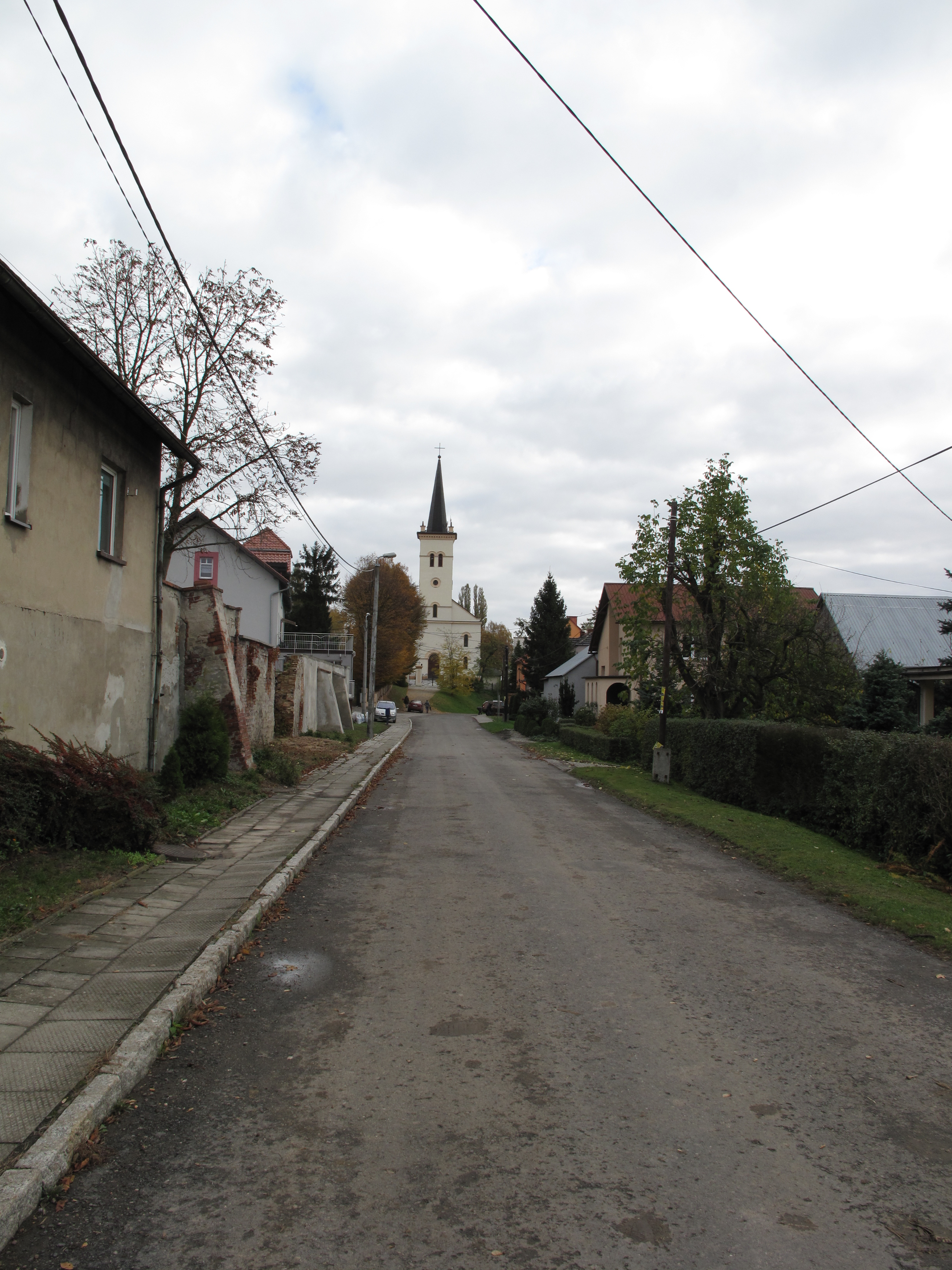
- Road to the church

- Location within Poland
- Coordinates: 50°11′6″N 18°13′18″E
- Country: Poland
- Voivodeship: Silesian
- County: Racibórz
- Gmina: Rudnik
- Population: 500

Sławików ([swaˈvikuf]; German: Slawikau, known as Bergkirch 1936–45) is a village in the administrative district of Gmina Rudnik, within Racibórz County, Silesian Voivodeship, in southern Poland.

== Gallery ==
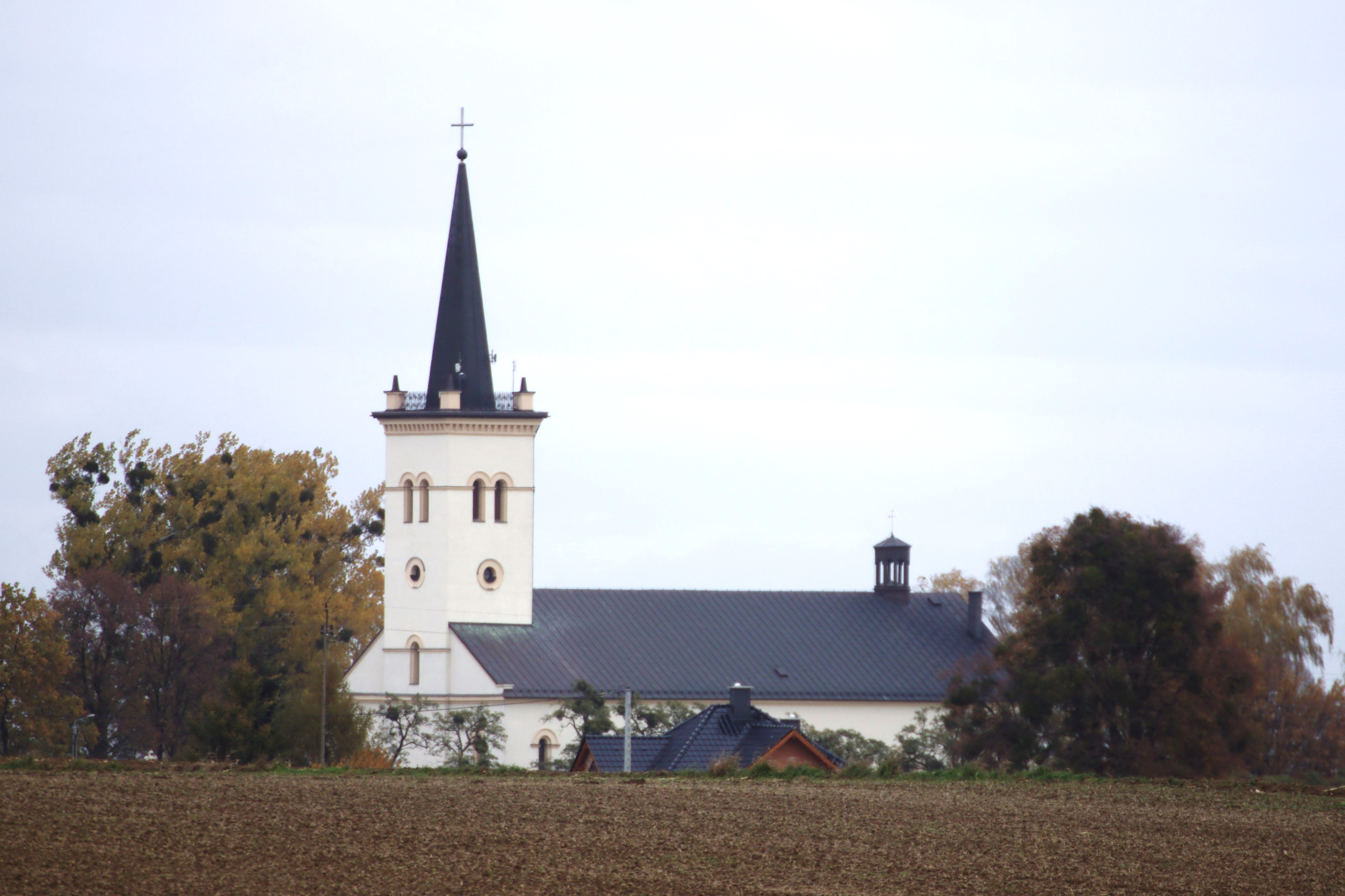
Church

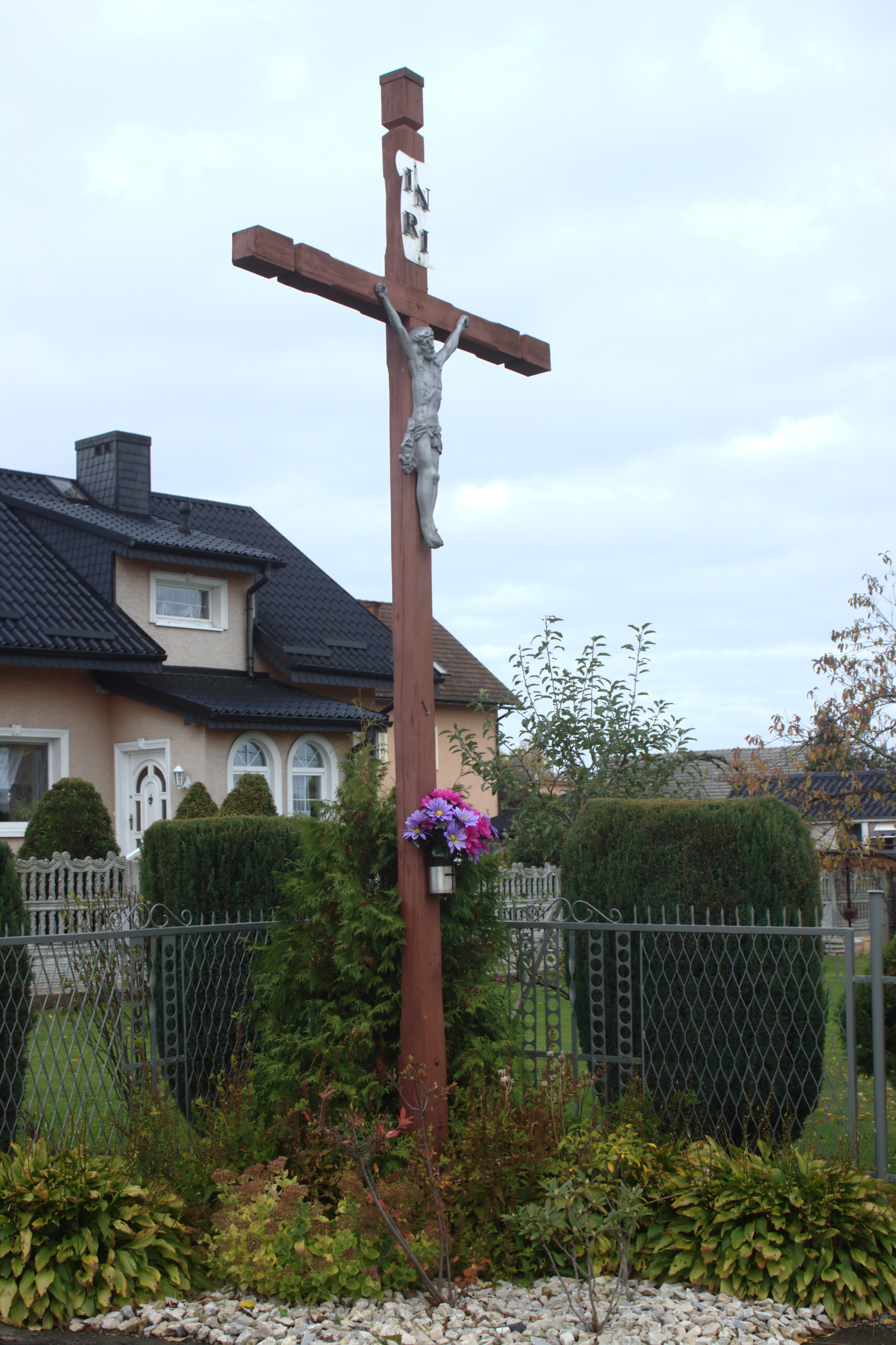
Cross

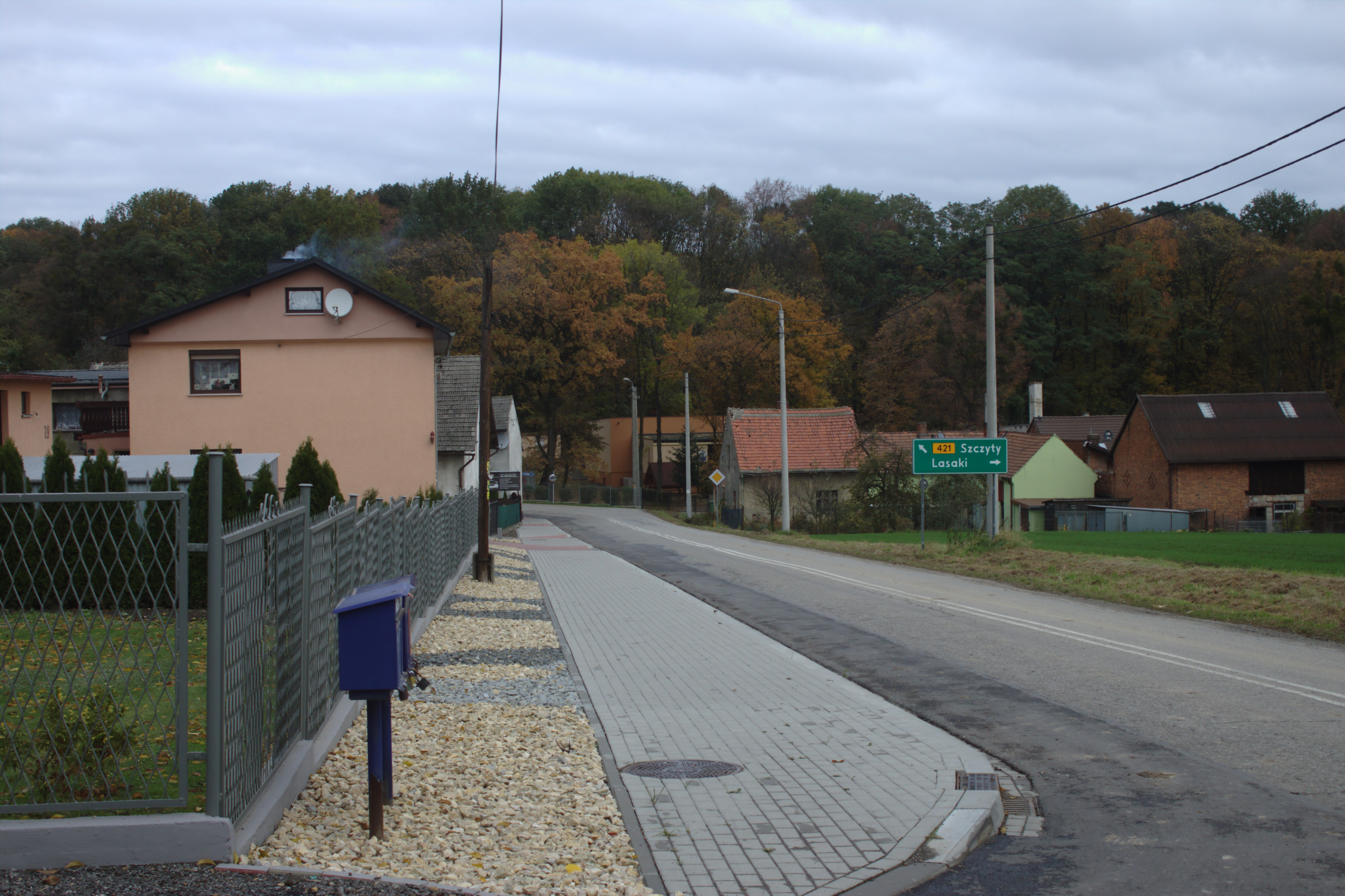
Houses
