= Albert Smidt =

German-born Australian serial killer

Albert Smidt ^{[A]}
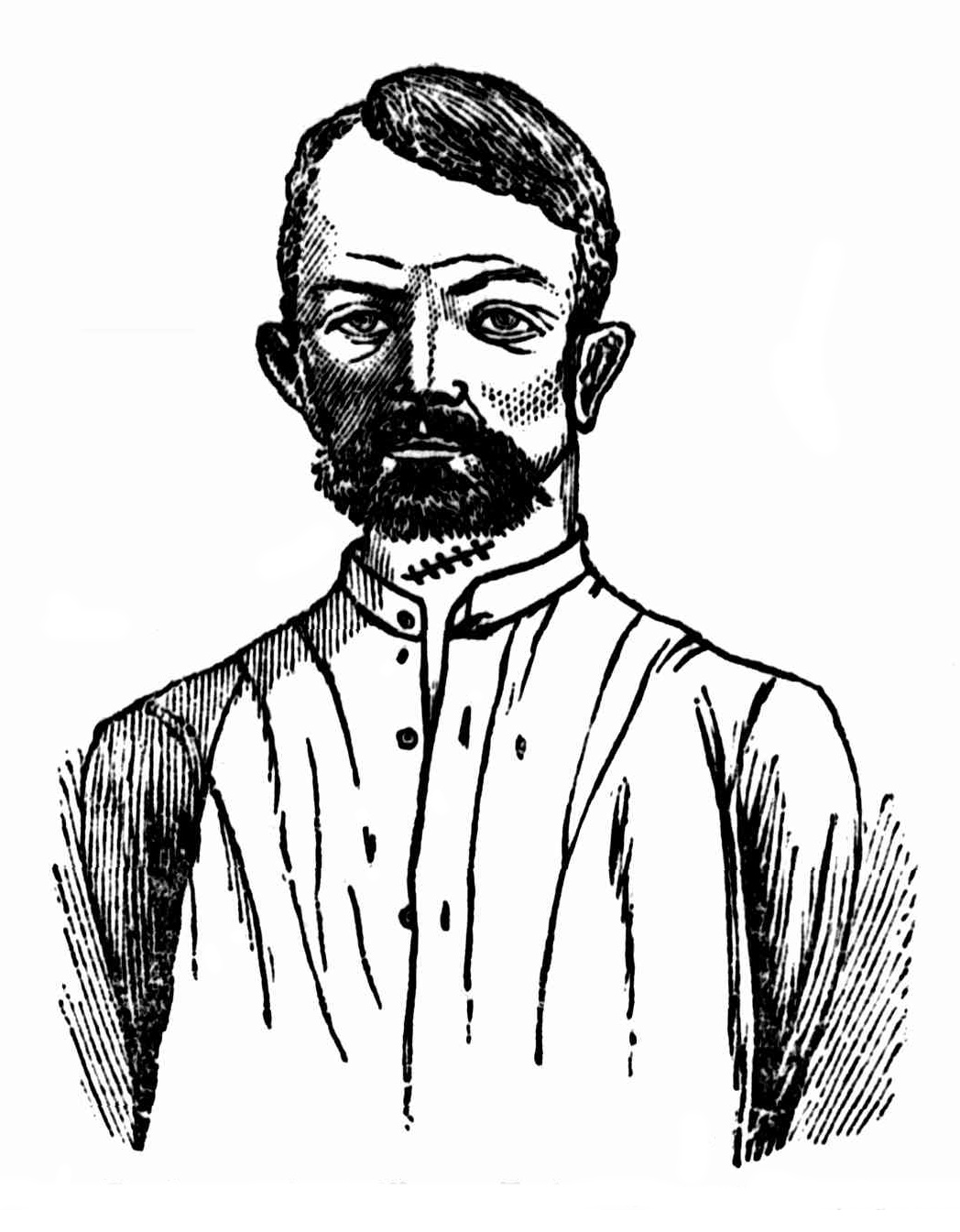
- Illustration of Albert Smidt (published in April 1890), showing the stitched wound in his neck from his recent suicide attempt.
- Born: c. 1847; Potsdam, Kingdom of Prussia
- Died: 18 November 1890 (aged 42/43); Wagga Wagga, Colony of New South Wales
- Cause of death: Execution by hanging
- Other names: Alfred Smith, Schmidt or Smitz; Alexander Schmidt or Smith
- Conviction: Murder
- Penalty: Death

Details
- Victims: unnamed male (possible); Jacob Rick (probable); John Young Taylor (convicted)
- Span of crimes: 1888–1890
- Country: Australia
- State: New South Wales

Albert Smidt (c. 1847 – 18 November 1890) was a German-born Australian serial killer who murdered two men (and possibly a third) in south-east New South Wales. Smidt was convicted of the murder in April 1890 of his travelling companion, John Young Taylor, and hanged for the crime at Wagga Wagga. It was strongly believed that Smidt had also murdered Jacob Rick, a travelling companion of both he and Taylor, but the investigation of Rick's disappearance stalled after police failed to locate his body. It was also suspected that Smidt had earlier murdered an unidentified man whose decapitated body was found in the Murrumbidgee River in October 1888, on 'Gellingroe' station downstream from Gundagai. However, Smidt's role in that murder remained a matter of conjecture. He was hanged at Wagga Wagga in November 1890.

== Biography ==
=== A German immigrant ===
Albert Smidt was born in about 1847 in Potsdam in Prussia, Germany. Rev. MacIntyre of Wagga Wagga, who frequently visited Smidt after he had been charged with murder in 1890, formed the opinion that Smidt was "a fairly educated and intelligent man, who had received in his youth a good deal of religious instruction".

In a statement made to the police in May 1890, Smidt claimed to have been in Australia for "eight or nine years" (i.e., since about 1881 or 1882), having initially arrived in Queensland. A later newspaper article recorded that Smidt "arrived in Victoria from New Zealand".

In Australia, Smidt was an itinerant miner, prospector, and rural worker. In about 1888 or 1889 Smidt possibly worked as a fisherman on the Murrumbidgee River in the vicinity of Gundagai. Another newspaper report stated that Smidt may have been in the Murrumbidgee district as early as 1881 or 1882, at which time he "employed himself fishing in the river". After he was charged with murder in April 1890, enquiries by the police ascertained that Smidt had been working as a prospector in the Wee Jasper district, east of Gundagai, since about 1888. It was reported that "he used to go away occasionally, and on his return always seemed to have a good supply of money".

A newspaper article in November 1890 described Smidt, who at the time was awaiting execution, as a man of about five feet four inches in height (1.63 m.), of medium build, and "inclined to be of fair complexion, although considerably sun-burnt". The prisoner's face was described as having "a sullen look", with "a low forehead, receding head, gray eyes, small moustache and 'goatee' beard".

=== The 'Gellingroe' murder ===
On Wednesday, 17 October 1888, the pastoralist Richard Whitacker, of 'Gellingroe' station (about twenty miles downstream from Gundagai), was fishing in the Murrumbidgee River about half a mile from his homestead when he discovered the headless, naked body of a man snagged on a log in the river. Whitacker informed the police at Gundagai and Constable Nickson was sent to investigate and take charge of the body. Nickson soon determined the man had been murdered “by one who is no novice in the business”. The man's head had been severed from the body by two distinct cuts, a piece of flesh was hanging from the shoulders and there were further marks of violence on the back and arms, indicating a fierce struggle with the killer had taken place. Nickson secured the body with ropes until it could be removed from the river. The body was “very much swollen and bloated”, reckoned to have been in the water less than three weeks. The man was estimated to be under 30 years of age, about five feet four inches (1.62 m.) tall, with the appearance of a healthy, muscular man. No trace of the head or clothing could be found. There had been no reports of a missing person from the district, suggesting that the murdered man had been a stranger to the area.

The murder of the unidentified man in 1888, found decapitated in the Murrumbidgee River downstream from Gundagai on 'Gellingroe' station, remained unsolved. In April 1890 Albert Smidt was arrested for the murder of his companion, John Young Taylor. The fact that Smidt had decapitated Taylor and buried the head and body in different locations led to speculation that Smidt had also been responsible for the earlier Gellingroe murder. After Smidt's arrest Inspector Charles Harrison from Wagga Wagga led the investigation into Smidt's possible involvement, as well as the circumstances surrounding the later disappearance of Smidt's companion, Jacob Rick. It was reported in May 1890 that "the police are in possession of information which leaves no doubt that [Smidt] was in the neighbourhood of Gundagai at the time" of the Gellingroe murder. Another report stated that Smidt had been employed as a fisherman on the Murrumbidgee River "prior to being seen about Wagga with Taylor". In the end, however, Smidt's role in the Gellingroe murder remained speculative.

=== Jacob Rick's murder ===
John Young Taylor and Jacob Rick were miners and prospectors based at Rushworth, in the Campaspe district of northern central Victoria. They left Rushworth on October 23, initially attracted by reports of a goldrush in the Parkes district of central west New South Wales. It was at Peak Hill, north of Parkes, where the two men met Alfred Smidt, and began working and travelling with him. Soon afterwards, finding the prospects at Peak Hill less than what they had anticipated, the two Rushworth miners, together with Smidt and another man named Tubbenhaur, decided to move on. The four men left Peak Hill in November 1889, travelling in a horse-drawn waggonette, and proceeded to the Good Friday Gully, near Young in inland south-east New South Wales, where they began working an old claim. After four days Taylor travelled to Peak Hill to collect property belonging to Rick and then returned to Rushworth. After a further nine days Rick, Smidt and Tubbenhaur abandoned the claim at Good Friday Gully. The waggonette was taken into Young for repairs, after which the three miners travelled to old diggings south of Young, between Wombat and Murrumburrah, arriving there on December 6 and establishing a camp. For the next eight days Rick, Smidt and Tubbenhaur were employed by a local farmer in harvesting work. Tubbenhaur then left the group, and Rick and Smidt travelled to the Wee Jasper district, east of Gundagai at the foot of the Brindabella Ranges, a region familiar to Smidt.

At Wee Jasper one of the wheels of the waggonette was repaired by a local tradesman named Frank Gardiner, after which the Rick and Smidt drove the vehicle eight miles to "Anderson's place", in undulating country west of Wee Jasper village, arriving there on Christmas Day. The two prospectors left the waggonette at that location and, loading a pack-horse, told Anderson they intended to prospect at Smith's old diggings on Sandy Creek, about five miles away in the Bungongo district. The two men were not seen again until the evening of December 31 when they camped at Shaking Bog Crossing on Adjungbilly Creek, near Thomas Bell's selection and five miles from Anderson's place. The following day, 1 January 1890, Rick and Smidt were taken by a local miner, Margules Keinitz, "to a likely prospecting site" in Garner's paddock in the Tumorrama district. They were observed by other miners at the location, shortly after noon on New Year's Day. Smidt and Rick prospected at the reef for only about an hour, before moving on later that afternoon.

Subsequent police investigations led to the conclusion that Jacob Rick was probably murdered by Smidt later in the afternoon of 1 January 1890, as the prospecting reef in Garner's paddock was the last place at which Rick was seen alive. At about four o'clock that same afternoon, Smidt, alone and leading the pack-horse, called at Bell's dwelling and purchased some butter. He then proceeded to Anderson's place, arriving there towards evening. When he was later interviewed by the police, Anderson recalled Smidt's "excited manner" on this occasion. When asked about Rick's whereabouts, he replied: "He has gone to Gundagai and taken the train to Victoria". As the hour was late, Anderson pressed him to stay, but Smidt refused, saying he was "in a great hurry". He then hitched the horse to the waggonette and departed. Smidt camped that night at his previous camp-site at Shaking Bog Crossing near Bell's selection. The next morning, January 2, he sold the tent he had been using to a local miner. The following day Smidt was seen at Keilley's place, eight miles along Adjungbilly Creek from the crossing-place. During the next few days Smidt was observed "proceeding up and down the creek from Keilley's in a mysterious manner", after which he returned to Keilley's and made unsuccessful efforts to sell the waggonette.

Smidt then drove the waggonette to Tumut via Brungle Creek, where he camped in the yard of McKay's hotel. At Tumut he again attempted to sell the waggonette, without success. Smidt then moved on to Adelong where he was again unable to find a purchaser for the vehicle. He continued on to Hillas' Creek, between Gundagai and Tarcutta, before heading south-west on the Great Southern Road towards Albury on the Victorian border.

As he travelled towards the Victorian border, Smidt camped for a day on a reserve near Bowna. While he was there he was observed by a group of boys, who were swimming in an adjacent waterhole, "busily washing an oppossum rug and effacing marks from the bottom of his waggon". The boys also reported that, after Smidt had left the camp, they found bloodstains on a log near where the waggon had been. On January 11 he arrived at Goode's wine shop at Eight-mile Creek, eight miles from Albury on the Sydney-road, where he remained until the 18th. Smidt left the waggonette with Goode and turned out the horse, asking the proprietor to sell both "if he could find a purchaser". He then travelled by coach to Albury, telling Goode "he intended proceeding to Victoria".

=== Taylor's murder ===
After Smidt crossed into Victoria at Albury in January 1890, he travelled to Rushworth. He stayed at a hotel in town for a few days until he ascertained where Taylor was living. He then "renewed his acquaintance" with Taylor, "and followed him about like a dog". Eventually, Smidt was able to persuade Taylor to go to the Tumbarumba diggings, where he claimed there was plenty of gold to be found by sluicing. Taylor purchased a new dray, as well as a red waggonette with a white tilt (canvas canopy), and two horses. The two men left Rushworth on about February 23 for Tumbarumba, on the western edge of the Snowy Mountains. In March the two prospectors arrived in the Wee Jasper district, but Taylor was not impressed by "the look of the country" and they left a few days later.

In late March 1890 Taylor and Smidt travelled via Tumut towards Wagga Wagga. On April 1 they arrived at George King's farm at Cunningdroo, twelve miles (19 km) east of Wagga Wagga (near Alfredtown on the Tarcutta road). Jack Taylor and King were friends, having known each other for ten years. During the visit Taylor told King he planned to sell his dray "as it did not pay him to be taking two vehicles about with him". Taylor and Smidt departed for Wagga two days later in the red waggonette, with Taylor telling King they would return on Easter Monday, April 7. The two men stayed at James Kerr's Wagga Wagga Hotel for four nights, during which they slept in the waggonette. When Taylor paid for the board on Monday morning, he told Kerr he was returning to King's at Cunningdroo "and might stay there a week or two to spell the horses".

Taylor and Smidt left Kerr's hotel in the red waggonette, mid-morning on Easter Monday, 7 April 1890, for the stated purpose of visiting George King at Cunningdroo. The two men drove half-a-mile along Edward-street and stopped at Juppenlatz's Viaduct Hotel, where they stayed for over three hours. During their time there "Taylor partook of liquor pretty freely, shouting for several persons". Smidt, on the other hand, had only one drink, "refusing to follow the example of his companion". When they left the Viaduct Hotel, Taylor was intoxicated and Smidt drove the waggonette. The two men next stopped at the Farmers' Home Hotel, on the Tarcutta Road towards Alfredtown, where they remained for about fifteen minutes. Taylor drank a brandy and Smidt a shandy-gaff. The publican, Grace Tillett, later testified that she refused to serve Taylor another drink "as she thought he had had enough", despite which he was "in good spirits and high good humour". When they reached Costello's hotel at Alfredtown, the two men stopped again and Taylor had two glasses of pale brandy and Smidt two small shandy-gaffs. When they left the hotel at about 2.30 p.m., Taylor was driving and Smidt was sitting behind in the body of the vehicle. From the Alfredtown Hotel, King's farm was three miles (4.8 km) further on along the Tarcutta road.

From the evidence of witnesses and wheel-tracks, Taylor and Smidt travelled at a steady pace from the Alfred Town Hotel on the Tarcutta Road, towards George King's farm. About 200 yards from King's, at a point in the road not visible from the house, the waggonette turned and headed back towards Alfredtown. Near where the wheel tracks turned, several pools of blood were found on the road. Witnesses later recalled seeing the red waggonette returning along the road "at a fast trot" and being driven by Smidt. Smidt stopped at a house close to the road between Alfredtown and Wagga belonging to Caroline Homer and her husband. He came down from the waggonette and asked Mrs. Homer if she had any eggs to sell. After being told she had none, he then proceeded to question her about local roads. He asked if there was any way to get to Junee without going through Wagga. When the woman replied he would have to go through the town, Smidt then questioned her about how he might get onto the Sydney road without going back the way he had come. He then asked her about a nearby road leading to the cemetery and Lake Albert. While they were conversing Caroline Homer "noticed something dropping from near the back of the waggonette on to the road: it looked a dark colour like blood". Smidt then drove the waggonette off the main road onto the branch road leading south to Lake Albert.

At about six o'clock in the afternoon Smidt stopped beside the Lake Albert road, about two-and-a-half miles from the Tarcutta road. About a hundred yards away was the camp-site of John Mepham and two other labourers employed by Gideon Watson, who had a contract for bridge- and road-works on the Lake Albert road. According to his later testimony, Mepham observed "the man in charge of the waggonette scraping out something with his feet, and then gathering dirt up with his hands, and taking it up and scraping it as I thought on the axle of the waggonette; he also appeared to be caulking up the bottom of the vehicle". At about 9.30 that night Mepham heard the sound of horses and saw the man driving the waggonette away from the location. With his suspicions aroused, Mepham went over to examine where the waggonette had been. Lighting a match, he saw what appeared to be blood-stains on the ground. Mepham decided to leave further examination until the morning, when he found further blood-stains and splashes in the area. He informed his employer, who immediately departed to inform the Wagga police of the suspicious activity. Senior-constable Henry Dixon and Constable Davidson were despatched to investigate. When they arrived at the locality, the policemen found trails of blood in various places along the Lake Albert road and at other places in the area where Smidt had stopped. They traced the wheel marks of the waggonette from the lake back as far as the railway gates, where the marks were lost.

After he left the spot near the road-workers camp, Smidt had driven onto a lane in the neighbourhood, running parallel to the Tarcutta road, where he camped with his horses and vehicle for the remainder of the night. The next morning he drove back through Wagga and crossed the bridge to North Wagga. At seven o'clock in the morning he pulled up at the Caledonian Hotel, on the Junee road at North Wagga, and purchased a bag of chaff from the publican.

Smidt arrived at Old Junee by mid-afternoon on Tuesday, April 8, where he stopped at the Samual Storey's store and purchased a spade, claiming it would be used for sinking post holes. Storey later testified that Smidt was "quite cool and collected". Smidt then crossed the creek in front of Storey's house (known as Houlaghan's Creek) and camped on the other side, within sight of the store. Later, while Storey was catching a sheep, he caught sight of Smidt, who in turn appeared to be watching him.

=== Arrest ===
On Wednesday morning, April 9, Senior-constable Dixon travelled by train to Junee, having decided that Smidt had probably travelled on the Temora road towards Old Junee. Dixon and Senior-constable Anderson of the Junee police then proceeded towards nearby Old Junee. After about a mile Dixon saw Smidt approaching, driving Taylor's waggonette with one horse in the shafts and the other tied to the rear. The policeman interrogated Smidt about the whereabouts of Taylor and the circumstances of him being in possession of the horses and vehicle. The German failed to give a satisfactory answer and Dixon arrested him "for being in possession of two horses and a waggonette reasonably supposed to be stolen and the property of John Young Taylor". Upon inspecting the contents of the waggonette, Dixon found a spade, with marks that appeared to be blood, and a tomahawk with "some hair and blood stains on it". Smidt was handcuffed and Dixon took charge of the reins and proceeded at a moderate pace in the direction of Wagga Wagga. Halfway between Old Junee and Wagga Dixon halted at the Wallacetown dam to give the horses a drink.

Dixon took a bucket from the back of the waggonette and told Smidt to lead the rear horse to the water's edge. As the policeman was filling the bucket, Smidt, standing two yards away, suddenly turned his back and started to cut at his throat. The prisoner had a razor in his left hand and a penknife in the other. Despite the "very determined nature of the attempt at suicide" Smidt only succeeded in making a two-inch wound directly under the chin with the penknife, before Dixon had charged at him, wrestled him to the ground and disarmed him. A drover in charge of some travelling sheep offered his assistance and the drover's cook was sent to Wagga to procure the services of a doctor for the wounded man. Handkerchiefs were placed around the wound, which "bled a great deal". Afterwards Smidt twice tore the bandages away, and "once got a finger of his left hand in his throat and attempted to pull his windpipe out", before straps were secured to his hands and fastened around his body.

When they were about eight miles from Wagga, Dixon was joined by Mounted-constable Jackson. As they proceeded towards town, "a slight report" of a firearm was heard and "on Dixon looking round he saw smoke issuing from the prisoner's mouth". Smidt, who was lying in the vehicle on a possum rug, had somehow managed to obtain a six-chambered pinfire revolver and discharged it into his mouth. The small bullet passed through the left side of his tongue, travelled around the jaw and exited at the back of his head near the ear. After this incident, the two policemen continued "as fast as possible" along the road with their prisoner. At O'Donnell's Caledonian Hotel, two miles from Wagga, they were met by Inspector Harrison and the Police Magistrate, Henry Baylis. By this time Smidt had lost consciousness. Dr. Druitt arrived shortly afterwards and stitched the wounds and Smidt was taken into Wagga and conveyed to the hospital. A constant watch was kept on the prisoner by "relays of constables, who relieve each other every four hours".

=== Finding Taylor's remains ===
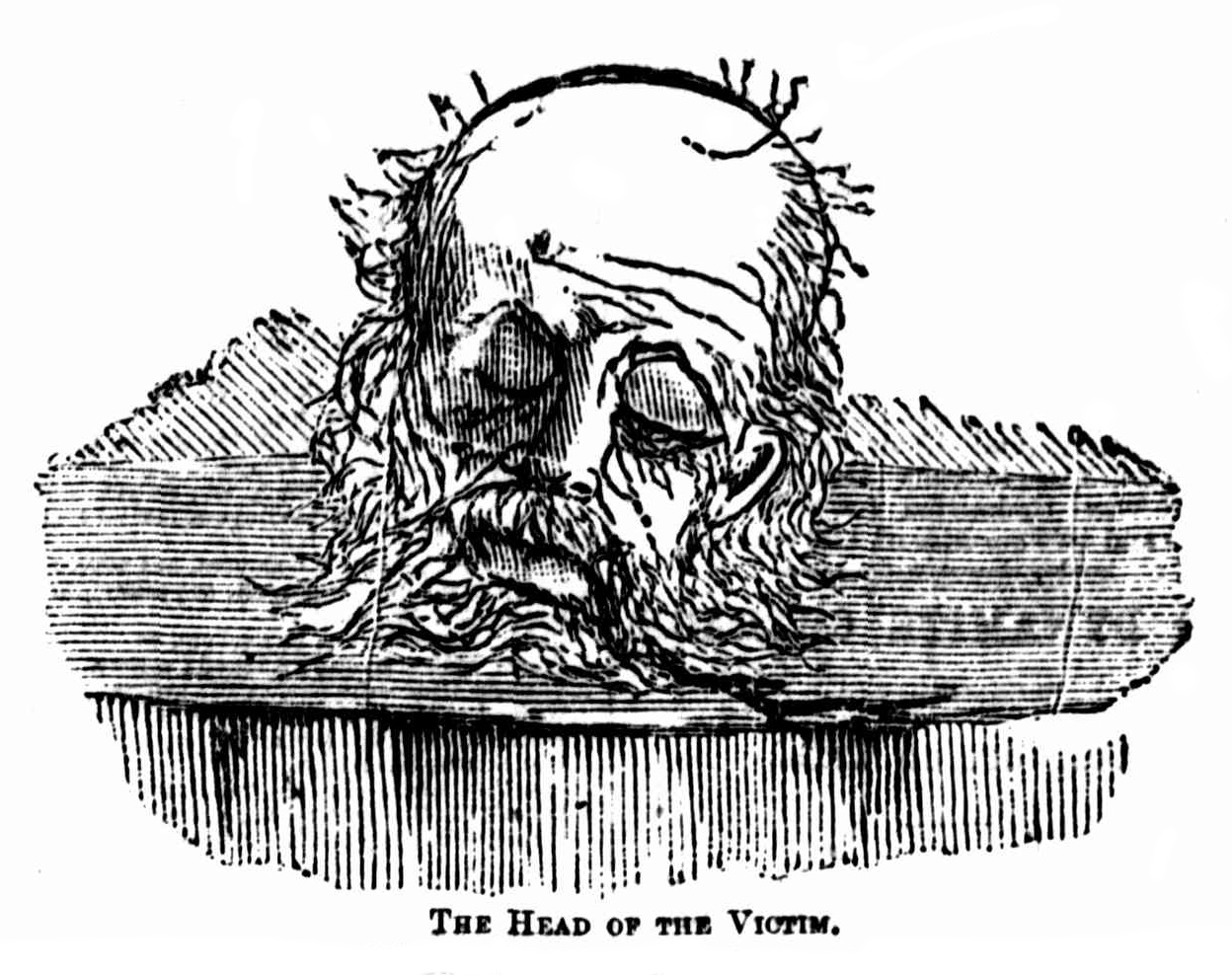
An illustration of the severed head of John Young Taylor (published in April 1890).

After Smidt's apprehension, searches were initiated to locate Taylor's body. Constables were sent out along the route taken by Smidt and every likely spot was "dilligently searched".

On Saturday, April 11, Senior-constable Dixon succeeded in finding Taylor's head, buried near where Smidt had camped beside Houlaghan's Creek, outside of Old Junee, shortly before his arrest. Rain had recently fallen in the district, which had "considerably swollen the watercourse" beside the camp-site. While searching the area, about sixty yards from Smidt's camp-site Dixon found a bootmark on the bank and started prodding into the nearby water with a stick, "and found the ground to be spongy". With the assistance of Samuel Storey, the local storekeeper, Dixon diverted the water away from the spot and proceeded to dig carefully with a shovel. Within a few minutes the constable "came upon a human head, which presented every evidence of having only been recently buried". The head had been "roughly severed from the body", with the flesh "jagged and torn in a fearful manner". Covered with blood and mud, the head was placed in a canvas bag and taken to the Junee police-station and afterwards conveyed by train to Wagga. On April 12 the head was identified at the Wagga lock-up by George King as being that of his "old and intimate friend". Other local witnesses also identified the head as that of John Young Taylor.

After the discovery of the human head by Dixon, attention became focussed on the vicinity of Smidt's camp-site near Old Junee. On the afternoon of Dixon's discovery, Senior-constable Anderson of the Junee police and the Narrandera black tracker, Richard Weston, assisted by a number of civilians, made a close search of the area. A young man named Cooney found a spot where the earth was recently disturbed, about fifty yards from the remains of Smidt's camp, and informed the supervising policeman. Anderson dug with a spade and found the body buried two feet from the surface. The body was unclothed except for a pair of socks. An examination of the ashes at the camp-site found shirt studs and buttons, as well as remnants of clothing.

The body was conveyed by mail train to Wagga, arriving there on Sunday morning, April 12. It was taken to the police barracks where a post-mortem examination was performed by Dr. Thomas Hillas and Dr. St. Clair Long and the connection of the two separate portions established. By then the body was in a more advanced state of decomposition, "and was sending off a strong effluvia". There were wounds and skull fractures on the head of the victim, possibly caused by blows from the back of a tomahawk, but were not considered sufficient to cause sudden death. The doctors agreed that Taylor had died from haemorrhage, not from the blows on the head. The body "had not a single drop of blood" in it and the heart cavity was found to be "totally bloodless". The evidence indicated that when Taylor's throat was cut, several of the smaller arteries – the facial, lienal and thyroid – were severed, but not the carotid, a situation that would cause the victim to bleed slowly to death. Decapitation had occurred the following day in the vicinity of Old Junee, at which stage death had occurred and the body had been drained of blood. The evidence from the post-mortem examination led to the conclusion that Taylor's throat had been cut late on Monday afternoon, April 7, "and the unfortunate victim allowed to bleed slowly to death, which may not have occurred until the following day". This conclusion was supported by "the frequent patches of blood" found at various places, widely apart, along the route taken by Smidt in the waggonette.

=== Confession ===
While he was held in custody in the Wagga Hospital, Smidt was frequently visited by the Presbyterian minister, Rev. John MacIntyre. The minister was careful to avoid the subject of the murder during his visits. However, after the discovery of the head and body of the murdered man, the prisoner appeared "very restless", indicating he had somehow arrived at the conclusion "that the mystery of the murder had been solved". On Monday night, April 14, he declared his intention to describe the circumstances of the crime to Rev. MacIntyre and Inspector Harrison. The following morning the two men attended Smidt's bedside to hear and record his confession. The taking down of the statement in writing occupied nearly two hours.

By Smidt's version of the events, his "mate" Jack had started arguing with him after they left the hotel at Alfredtown. Smidt claimed Taylor told him "he was not a good driver" and "did not know how to use a horse". He said Taylor hit him several times, "and said I was no good". Smidt claimed: "I was going to hit him, but he guarded off and gave me another clout, and in a moment I got a tomahawk and hit him on the head". He described Taylor falling onto the road and how he "lifted him up and saw the poor fellow was dead". Smidt intended to hide the body near Lake Albert, but with a work party in the vicinity, he decided against it. The next morning he drove into Wagga, crossed the Murrumbidgee and headed north-east towards Old Junee with Taylor's body hidden in the waggonette. He reached Old Junee by mid-afternoon, where he purchased a spade at a store. Smidt then followed a gully outside of the township, where he camped "a good way" from the road near an old crossing-place. During the night he undressed the corpse and "took the poor man's head off, because I thought he would not be recognised when they should find him in the hole". He buried Taylor's body beside the gully above the crossing-place and the man's head was buried "a little further up, 10 or 12 yards on the same side, more on the bank". He then burned the clothes and attempted to wash the blood out of the vehicle. Smidt claimed in his confession he had intended taking the horse and waggonette back to Kerr's place near Wagga and then "give myself up and confess my sin to a clergyman, and afterwards shoot myself or cut my throat".

After Smidt's statement had been obtained, Inspector Harrison told a reporter for a local newspaper that "the prisoner's statement is not, in his opinion, a reliable one". He was confident that the police had "a perfect chain of evidence" in order to convict Smidt of the crime, without having to rely on details from his confession.

=== Inquest ===
The inquest into John Young Taylor's death had been scheduled for Monday, April 21, but on the previous Thursday Smidt's condition deteriorated after an abscess developed in his throat along the path of the bullet wound. At about this time questions began to be asked about Smidt's possible connection to the apparent disappearance of Jacob Rick, the old Rushworth resident and companion of Taylor. It had been reported in Melbourne's Argus newspaper that friends of his had expressed anxiety about his fate. After being in the company of Smidt at Lambing Flat, Rick had "never wrote, although he promised to do so" when he left Rushworth. The inquest at Wagga was adjourned until the following Monday after it was reported that the prisoner's health had begun to improve. Rev. MacIntyre continued to visit the prisoner in hospital, who was spending "a good deal of his time in reading the Bible".

Before the inquest commenced on Monday, 28 April 1890, at the Wagga Court House, Smidt was brought before Henry Baylis, the Police Magistrate at Wagga, and charged with having two horses and a waggonette, together with its contents, in his illegal possession and he was formally remanded in custody. The adjourned inquest into John Young Taylor's death resumed at 10 a.m. before the district coroner, Leonard A. Fosbery, and a jury of fifteen. Smidt's appearance in court was described as "very pale and much emaciated, but he was thoroughly self possessed and apparently emotionless". A pair of "stalwart" constables stood on either side of his chair at the end of the solicitors' table.

On the first day of the inquest witnesses described their interactions with Smidt on the day of the murder and the following day. Senior-constable Dixon recounted the details of Smidt's arrest near Old Junee, his suicide attempts and the discovery of the victim's head. The inquest resumed on the following day when further evidence was presented, including Smidt's confession and details of the post-mortem examination of Taylor's remains. After the evidence had concluded, the prisoner Smidt indicated that he wished to say something additional to his written statement. Smidt was placed in the winess box and had the oath administered to him. The prisoner spoke in so low a voice that he was inaudible to the courteroom, but his words were conveyed by Inspector Harrison (who was standing beside him). Smidt said he had no intention to kill Taylor, claiming: "When I first knocked Taylor down with the tomahawk I thought he was dead, that I had killed him". He added: "Shortly afterwards I cut his throat thinking he was dead".

In summing up the Coroner strongly suggested that, leaving aside Smidt's confession, the clear chain of evidence "pointed only to one conclusion". After a retirement of only twenty minutes the jury found that the deceased John Young Taylor had "been wilfully murdered" on the 7th or 8 April by the accused, Alfred Smidt. The prisoner was then committed for trial at the Wagga Court of Assizes in September 1890.

After the inquest Smidt was interviewed in the lock-up by Rev. John MacIntyre, during which the prisoner "broke down and wept" on several occasions. When he was asked about Jacob Rick, Smidt at first claimed he was unfamiliar with the name. When MacIntyre pointed out that Rick's watch had been found in Smidt's possession, he admitted to knowing the man but would give no explanation of Rick's fate. The minister "exhorted and pleaded with him to tell what he knew", to no avail. Smidt "said it was enough to die for one man, and he wanted to die".

On April 29 the prisoner was taken to Goulburn on the mail train where he was placed in the jail hospital for a few days and then kept into a padded cell with his hands secured. Smidt remained incarcerated at the Goulburn jail, "where better facilities exist for his safe keeping", until his trial in September.

=== The search for Rick's remains ===
In late-May 1890 Senior-constable Dixon of Wagga led a party of policemen and aboriginal trackers in a search for Jacob Rick's body in the districts near Wee Jasper. Dixon was joined in the nine-day search by Senior-constables Skelton and Nickson of Gundagai, Tracker Weston from Narrandera and a constable and black tracker from Little River, near Tumut. The party was hampered in their search by persistent rain. They commenced operations at Higgin's Camp on Adjungbilly Creek, and followed the creek up to Shaking Bog Crossing, "closely examining all the holes, tunnels, and tail races" along the route (although the rugged topography made a completely thorough search impossible). At Shaking Bog Crossing they identified the spot where Smidt and Rick had worked, directed by the local miner Margules Keinitz. They searched the numerous mining holes in the area and cleaned the sand out of several races, but without success.

After the unsuccessful search for Rick's remains, Senior-constable Dixon sought to follow the route taken by Smidt after leaving the Wee Jasper district in early-January 1890. The policeman "had little difficulty" in tracing Smidt's route, with roadside innkeepers and residents "readily identifying" a photograph of Smidt. In addition, the waggonette driven by Smidt "possessed a certain peculiarity that allowed of its being very readily traced from place to place". On 8 June 1890 Dixon arrived at Goode's wine-shop at Eight-mile Creek near Albury. When Dixon examined the waggonette left at Goode's premises, in addition to picks and other mining tools, he found a blood-stained tomahawk, as well as a rolled up possum-skin rug, in the middle of which was a large patch of what was believed to be dried blood. He also found blood stains on the seat of the vehicle. Captain Battye of the Wagga police later surmised that Smidt, after murdering his companion, had carried Rick's head wrapped in the possum-skin rug until "he found it convenient to dispose of it in a similar manner to that of the Taylor murder". After Smidt's arrest in April, a silver watch was found in his possession, which he claimed as his own. Police investigations subsequently revealed that the inscribed number on the watch tallied with that of a watch sold to Rick by a watch-maker at Rushworth.

=== Trial ===
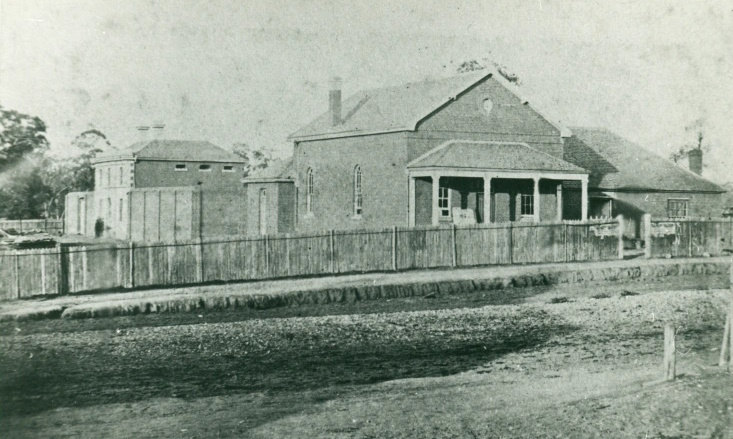
The Court House facing Fitzmaurice Street, Wagga Wagga, with the adjoining Gaol behind, the locations of Smidt's conviction and execution (photographed in the 1870s).

The sittings of the Wagga Circuit Court commenced on the morning of 26 September 1890, presided by Justice Sir Charles Innes. Alfred Smidt was placed in the dock and was called upon to plead to the charge of wilful murder of John Young Taylor. The prisoner, "in a firm voice", pleaded not guilty. When the judge ascertained that Smidt was undefended and without the means to obtain legal assistance, he assigned the barrister, W. Whitfield, to take the prisoner's defence as counsel, to be assisted by the solicitor, Harry B. Fitzhardinge. The trial was postponed until Monday, September 29, to enable the preparation of a defence.

When the trial commenced on September 29 the evidence presented by the prosecution was substantively similar to that given at the inquest in late-April. No evidence was called for the defence. It was reported that Whitfield "made an excellent speech" in Smidt's defence, calling upon the jury to return a verdict of manslaughter. In his summing up, Justice Innes commented on contradictory statements made by the prisoner on various occasions, which seemed to have been made "for the purpose of, in some way, exculpating himself". The jury retired and deliberated for about twenty minutes, before returning a verdict of guilty of "wilful murder". The judge then passed a sentence of death on the prisoner, commenting that "this crime of yours was a cold-blooded, atrocious murder".

=== Execution ===
After being found guilty Smidt was incarcerated in the Wagga Gaol to await his execution. The prisoner was regularly visited by the Anglican clergyman, Archdeacon Pownall, during his occupancy of the condemned cell at Wagga.

After Smidt's trial, in an effort to have Smidt's execution carried out elsewhere, the Wagga Municipal Council sent a letter to the New South Wales Minister of Justice, "pointing out that the public sentiment was shocked by hangings being permitted to take place within the precincts of a small jail situated in the very heart of the business part of town". The Minister's reply stated that "the Government could not see their way to any alteration being made in the arrangements for the execution of the criminal". On October 28 the Executive Council met and established November 18 as the date for the sentence of the Court to be carried out.

The scaffold was constructed in the jail-yard, thirty yards away from Smidt's cell. The structure was composed of heavy timbers and painted black. During the construction, efforts were made to reduce noise as much as possible. The timbers were cut to length outside the jail and "screw nails" were used to secure the joints. The hangman, Robert Howard, and his assistant arrived from Sydney a week before the execution and were provided with quarters at the jail. In an effort to conceal the scaffold from houses adjacent to the jail, a wide canvas screen was placed around two sides of the jail walls.

At a few minutes past nine o'clock on Tuesday morning, 18 November 1890, Alfred Smidt was executed within the walls of the Wagga Gaol. On the morning of the execution Smidt was provided with "a good breakfast". Archdeacon Pownall was in attendance from an early hour. A few minutes before the appointed hour the hangman and his deputy entered the cell, pinioned the prisoner's arms and led him to the scaffold. After the last religious rites were performed by Pownall, the white cap was pulled over Smidt's face, the rope was placed around his neck and the noose pulled tight. On a signal from the hangman, the bolt was sprung to release the trap. Death appeared to be instantaneous, "for hardly a muscle was seen to quiver after the body fell". After a quarter of an hour the medical officer in attendance, Dr. Wren, examined Smidt's body and "pronounced life to be extinct".

At five o'clock in the afternoon the coffin containing Smidt's body was placed in the hearse. It was taken to the town cemetery and placed in the prepared hole in unconsecrated ground adjoining the cemetery proper. As reported in one of the local newspapers: "A hastily made mound now marks the place of confinement of the relics of one whose presence the world was well rid of, and for whose departure from here at the hangman's hands no one regrets".

== Victims ==
- Jacob Rick – born in about 1835 in Hochkirch in Württemberg, Germany. Rick had been a resident of Rushworth in Victoria from 1870 where he "followed mining pursuits". In the first few years Rick "made a great deal of money by mining in Rushworth", but in later years "he had spent a good deal in prospecting". He was considered by those who knew him to be "very steady and industrious, and always in possession of a few pounds". Rick was described as a man who was "short of stature, stout, of ruddy complexion, with a high forehead, black curly hair, the mark of an abscess... on the left side of his head, and a full black beard".
- John Young Taylor – born in about 1830 in the Yetholm parish of Roxburghshire, Scotland (near the border with England), the son of John Taylor and Agnes (née Young). Taylor had emigrated to the colony of Victoria by the mid-1850s (during the goldrush era), and eventually settled at Rushworth. He worked as a miner and prospector in the Victorian and New South Wales goldfields, as well as engaging in rabbiting and railway construction work. He never married and "was always of a roving disposition". Taylor had two siblings in the Australian colonies: William Young Taylor, a farmer at Meredith, Victoria (between Geelong and Ballarat); and Ellen, a younger sister who married Mathew Moreton, of the railway contracting firm of Messrs. Fishburn and Morton. Taylor worked as a cart-driver for Fishburn and Morton during the construction of the Junee to Narrandera railway line (completed in 1881). Taylor was five feet eleven inches in height, with grey hair and "silvered" whiskers towards the end of his life.

== See also ==
- List of serial killers by country

== Notes ==
A.In contemporary newspaper reports Alfred Smidt's name appears in a number of variations and combinations. As well as 'Albert', his forename was also recorded as 'Alfred' and 'Alexander'. His surname appears in newspaper records as 'Smidt', 'Schmidt', 'Smitz' and 'Smith'. However on official records, as they relate to his crimes and execution in 1890, he was named 'Alfred Smidt'. This was the name used consistently by authorities on documents such as the record of his execution, the coroner's report and registration of death.
