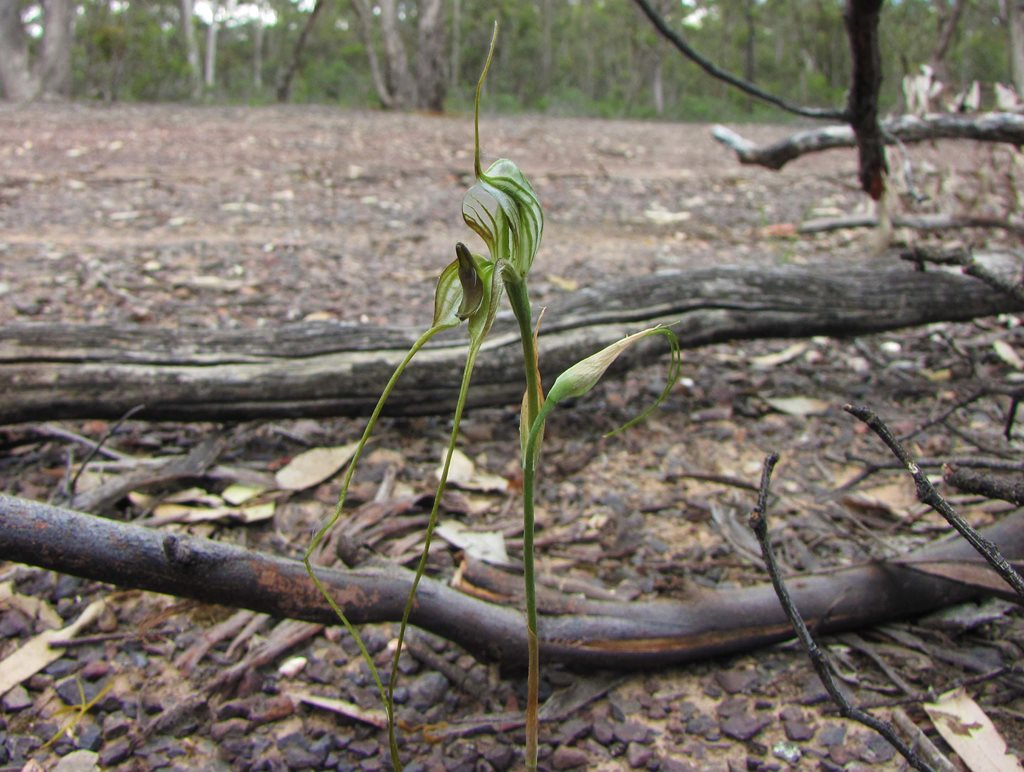
- Pterostylis woollsii growing near Whroo in Victoria

Scientific classification
- Kingdom: Plantae
- Clade: Tracheophytes
- Clade: Angiosperms
- Clade: Monocots
- Order: Asparagales
- Family: Orchidaceae
- Subfamily: Orchidoideae
- Tribe: Cranichideae
- Genus: Pterostylis
- Species: P. woollsii

Binomial name
- Pterostylis woollsii Fitzg.

Synonyms
- Oligochaetochilus woollsii (Fitzg.) Szlach.

= Pterostylis woollsii =

Long-tailed rustyhood

Species of orchid

Pterostylis woollsii, commonly known as long-tailed rustyhood, is a plant in the orchid family Orchidaceae and is endemic to eastern Australia. It has a rosette of leaves at its base and up to six transparent flowers which have unusually long tips on their lateral sepals and a reddish-brown, insect-like labellum.

== Description ==
Pterostylis woollsii, is a terrestrial, perennial, deciduous, herb with an underground tuber. It has a rosette of between six and ten lance-shaped to egg-shaped leaves at the base of the flowering spike, each leaf 15–35 mm (0.6–1 in) long and 8–14 mm (0.3–0.6 in) wide. The leaves are often withered by the time of flowering. Up to six translucent flowers with green and reddish tinges and 35–60 mm (1–2 in) long, 12–14 mm (0.5–0.6 in) wide are borne on a flowering spike 200–450 mm (8–20 in) tall. Each flower is carried on the end of a long, thin stalk. Two to five stem leaves are wrapped around the flowering spike. The dorsal sepal and petals are joined to form a hood called the "galea" over the column with the dorsal sepal having a thread-like tip 15–20 mm (0.6–0.8 in) long often bent upwards. The lateral sepals are turned downwards and are wider than the galea. They are shallowly dished, densely hairy on their outer edges and suddenly taper to a thread-like tip, 90–130 mm (4–5 in). The labellum is dark reddish-brown, thin and insect-like, 10–11 mm (0.4–0.4 in) long and 3–4 mm (0.1–0.2 in) wide and hairy. Flowering occurs from October to December.

== Taxonomy and naming ==
Pterostylis woollsii was first formally described in 1876 by Robert D. FitzGerald and the description was published in his book Australian Orchids. Fitzgerald gave the specific epithet (woollsii) "after my friend, Dr. Woolls, who has contributed so largely to the knowledge of Botany in New South Wales, and who kindly sent me specimens discovered by him growing in the neighbourhood of Richmond".

== Distribution and habitat ==
Long-tailed rustyhood has a widespread but disjunct distribution in New South Wales where it grows in forest in grassy or rocky places. It also occurs in Queensland as far north as Carnarvon Gorge but in Victoria it is only known from the Rushworth area.

== Conservation ==
Pterostylis woollsii is classified as "endangered" in Victoria under the Victorian Government Flora and Fauna Guarantee Act 1988.
