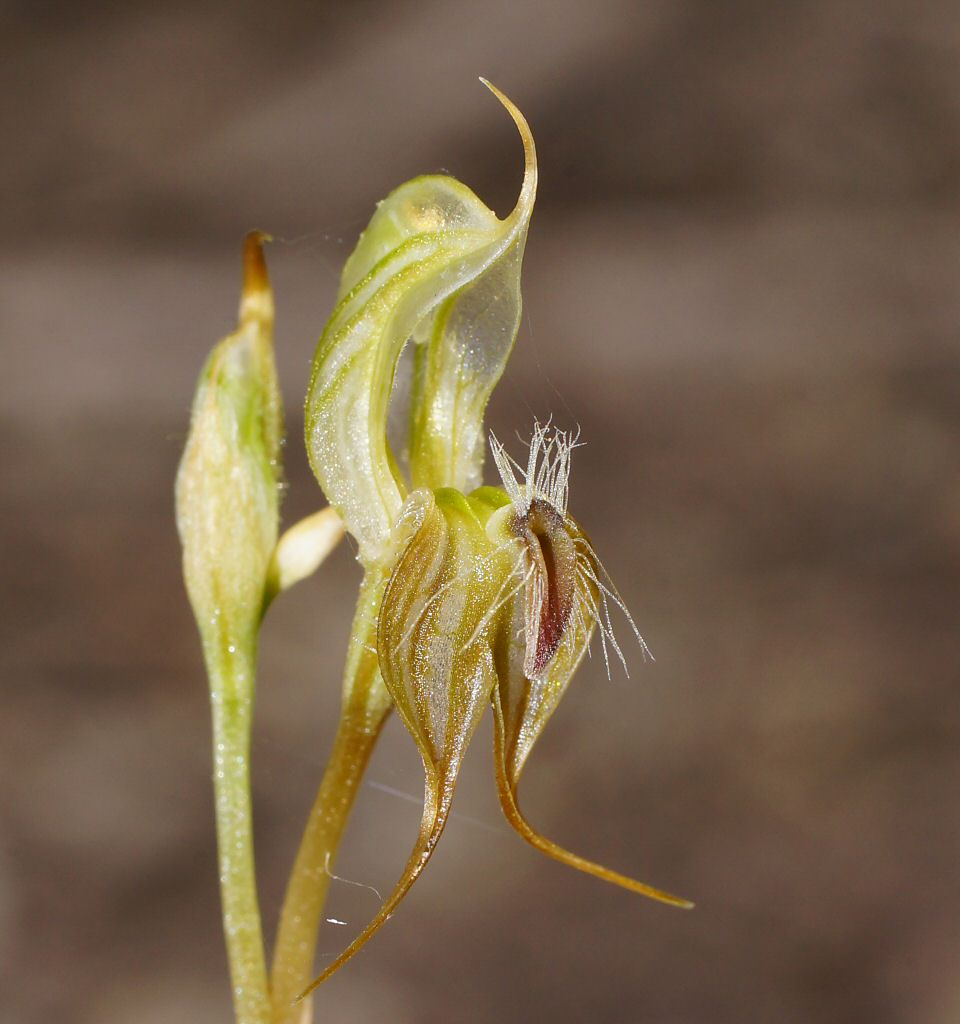
- Pterostylis setifera growing near Rushworth

Scientific classification
- Kingdom: Plantae
- Clade: Tracheophytes
- Clade: Angiosperms
- Clade: Monocots
- Order: Asparagales
- Family: Orchidaceae
- Subfamily: Orchidoideae
- Tribe: Cranichideae
- Genus: Pterostylis
- Species: P. setifera

Binomial name
- Pterostylis setifera M.A.Clem., Matthias & D.L.Jones

Synonyms
- Oligochaetochilus setifer (M.A.Clem., Matthias & D.L.Jones) Szlach.

= Pterostylis setifera =

Bristly rustyhood

Species of orchid

Pterostylis setifera, commonly known as the bristly rustyhood or sikh's whiskers, is a plant in the orchid family Orchidaceae and is endemic to south-eastern Australia. It has a rosette of leaves and four to ten translucent white, green and brown flowers which have an insect-like labellum with long, bristly hairs.

== Description ==
Pterostylis setifera, is a terrestrial, perennial, deciduous, herb with an underground tuber. It has a rosette of between five and ten egg-shaped leaves at the base of the flowering spike, each leaf 20–40 mm (0.8–2 in) long and 6–12 mm (0.2–0.5 in) wide. Between two and ten transparent white flowers with green and light brown markings and about 18 mm (0.7 in) long are borne on a flowering spike 150–300 mm (6–10 in) tall. Five to eight stem leaves are wrapped around the flowering spike. The dorsal sepal and petals form a hood over the column with the dorsal sepal having an upturned point about 5–6 mm (0.20–0.24 in) long. The lateral sepals turn downwards, joined to each other for about half their length and are much wider than the hood. They have thread-like tips 7–10 mm (0.3–0.4 in) long and curve forwards and away from each other. The labellum is lance-shaped, 4–5 mm (0.16–0.20 in) long and about 2 mm (0.08 in) wide. There are 10 to 15 bristles up to 5 mm (0.2 in) long on each side of the labellum and many short bristles on the "head" end. Flowering occurs from September to November.

== Taxonomy and naming ==
Pterostylis setifera was first formally described in 1985 by Mark Clements, I.G. Matthias and David Jones from a specimen collected in the Ingalba Nature Reserve in Temora. The description was published in the Kew Bulletin. The specific epithet (setifera) is a Latin word meaning "bearing bristles".

== Distribution and habitat ==
The bristly rustyhood grows in a variety of habitats including among rocks and in mallee vegetation. It occurs south from Narrabri in New South Wales and in scattered populations between Wedderburn and Rushworth in Victoria. It is only found the Murray botanical region in South Australia and is rare in both Victoria and South Australia.
