= Balaclava =

Balaklava usually refers to:

- Balaklava, a town in Crimea
  - Battle of Balaclava, a battle of the Crimean War
  - Balaklava District, an administrative raion (district) of the city of Sevastopol

Balaclava and Balaklava also refer to:

== Other places ==
- Balaclava, New South Wales, Australia
- Balaklava, South Australia, Australia
- Balaclava, Victoria, Australia
  - Balaclava railway station, Melbourne
  - Division of Balaclava, a former electoral division
- Balaclava, Grey County, Ontario, Canada
- Balaclava, Renfrew County, Ontario, Canada
- Balaclava, Jamaica
  - Balaclava railway station, Jamaica
- Balaclava, New Zealand, a suburb of Dunedin
- Balaclava Junction, a tram junction in Caulfield North, Victoria, Australia
- Balaclava Bay, Portland Harbour, England
- Balaclava Mine, in the Australian ghost town of Whroo, Victoria

== Other uses ==
- Balaclava (clothing), a form of cloth headgear
- Balaklava, a GWR Iron Duke Class steam locomotive
- Balaklava (album), by Pearls Before Swine, 1968
- "Balaclava" (song), a song by the Arctic Monkeys from the 2007 album Favourite Worst Nightmare
- Balaclava (film), a 1928 British silent war film

== See also ==
- Baklava, a layered pastry dessert
