= Balaklava =

Place in Sevastopol, Crimea

Balaklava Балаклава Balıqlava
- part of Sevastopol
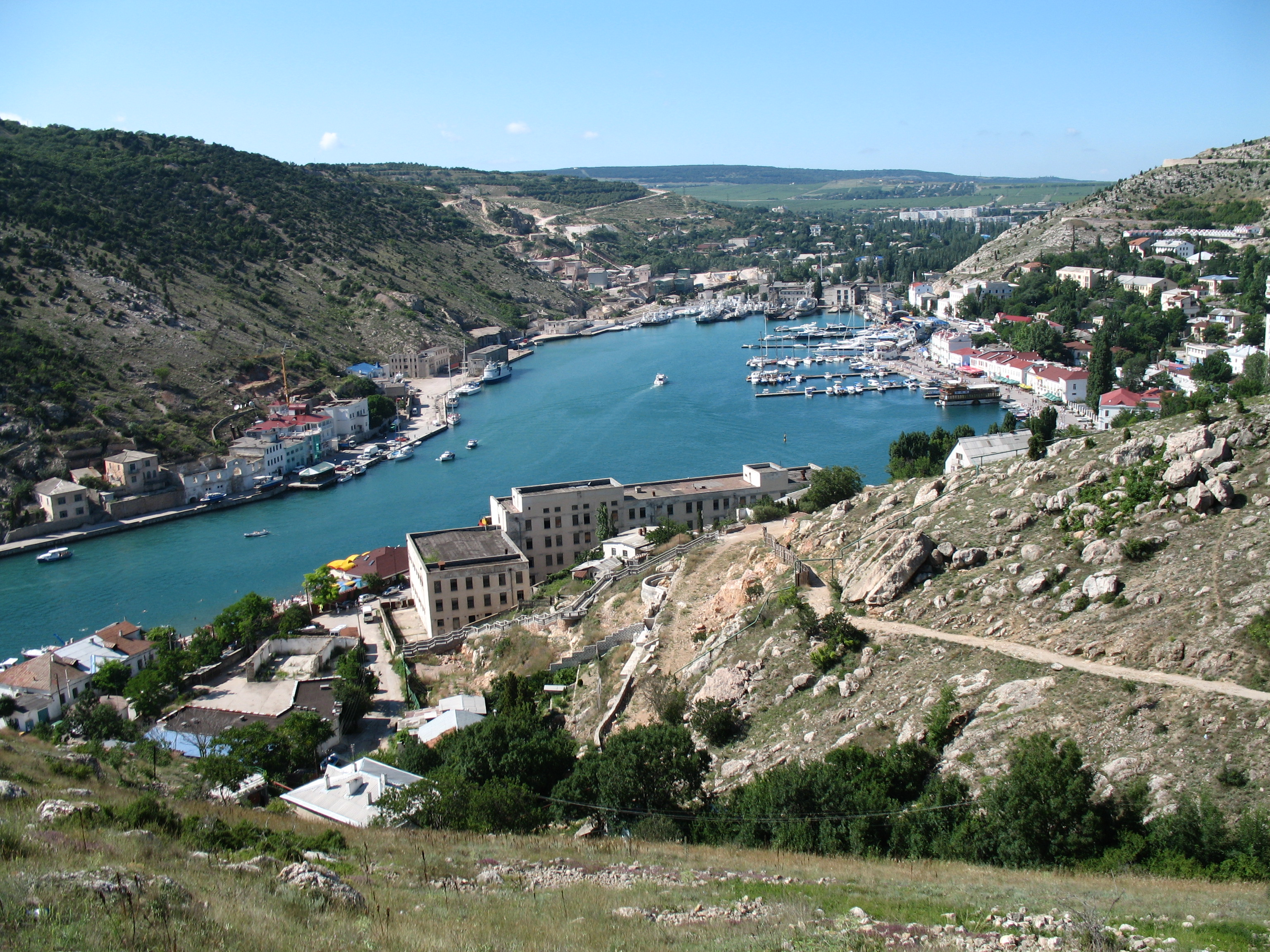
- View of Balaklava from the Genoese fortress

- Flag Coat of arms

- Location of Balaklava within Sevastopol
- Coordinates: 44°30′0″N 33°36′0″E
- Country: Disputed; Russia, Ukraine
- Region: Sevastopol
- Elevation: 10 m (33 ft)

Population
  - Total: 18,649
- Time zone: UTC+4 (MSK)
- Postal code: 299xxx
- Area code: +380-692
- Former name: Cembalo (until 1475), Yamboli, Symbolon
- Website: http://sovetbalaclava.ru/

Balaklava (Ukrainian and Russian: Балаклава, Crimean Tatar: Balıqlava, Greek: Σύμβολον) is a settlement on the Crimean Peninsula and part of the city of Sevastopol. It is an administrative center of Balaklavsky District that used to be part of the Crimean Oblast before it was transferred to Sevastopol Municipality. Population: 18,649 (2014 Census).

== History ==
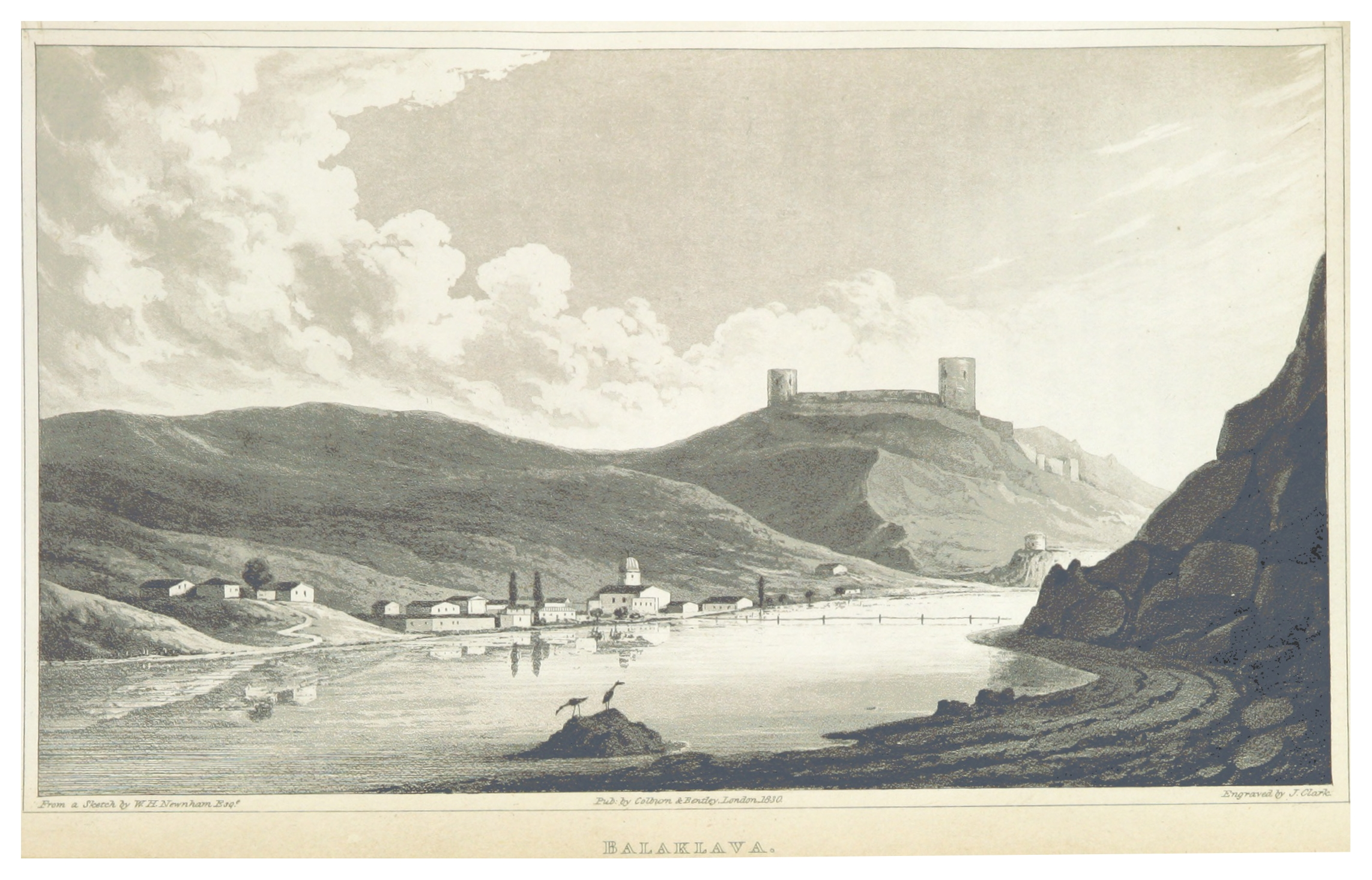
Balaklava harbor, 1830

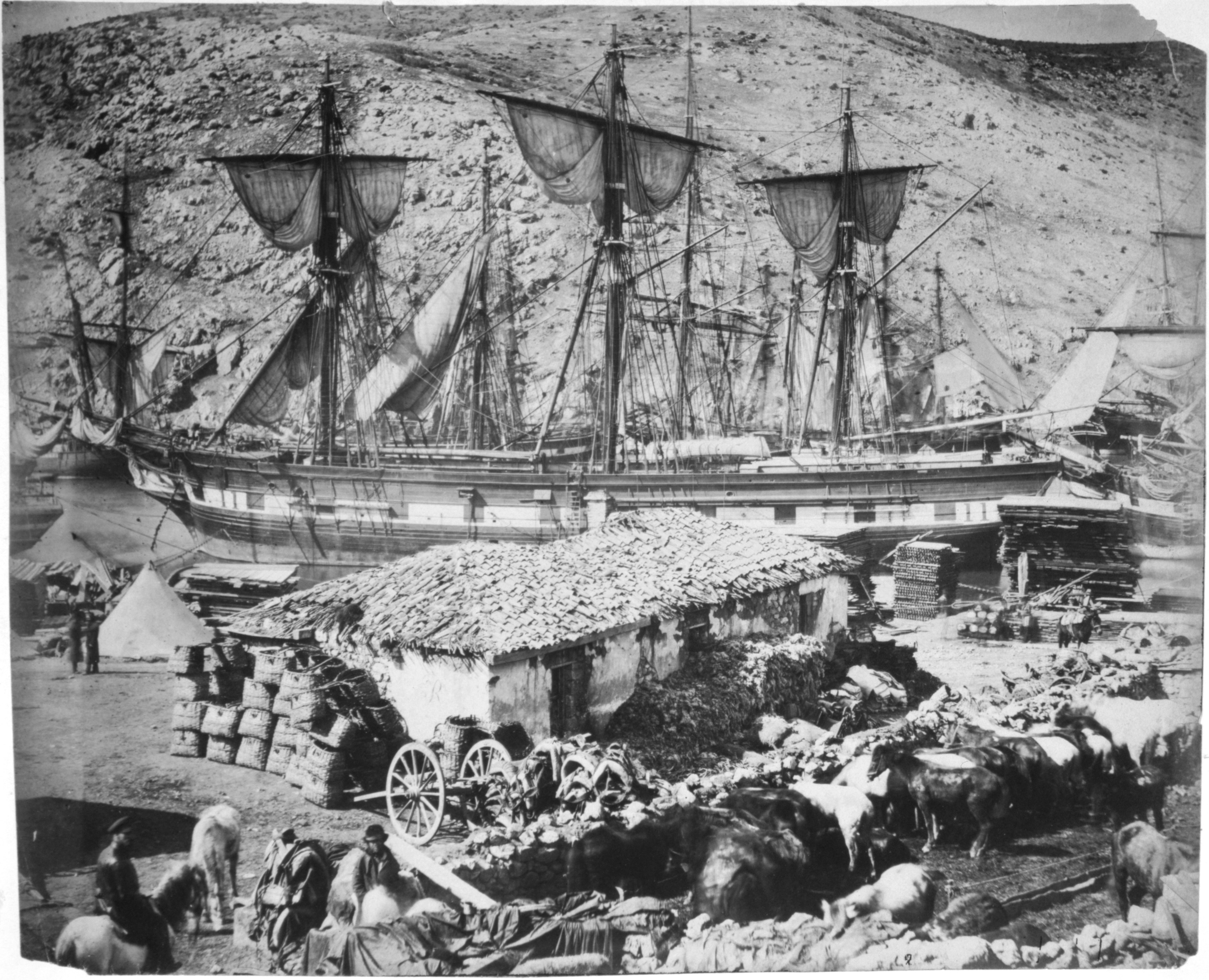
Balaklava harbor, 1855, photographed by Roger Fenton

Balaklava has changed possession several times during its history. A settlement at its present location was founded under the name of Symbolon (Σύμβολον) by the Ancient Greeks, for whom it was an important commercial city.

During the Middle Ages, it was controlled by the Byzantine Empire and then by the Genoese who conquered it in 1365. The Byzantines called the town Yamboli and the Genoese named it Cembalo. The Genoese built a large trading empire in both the Mediterranean and the Black Sea, buying slaves in Eastern Europe and shipping them to Egypt via the Crimea, a lucrative market hotly contested with by the Venetians.

The ruins of a Genoese fortress positioned high on a clifftop above the entrance to the Balaklava Inlet are a popular tourist attraction and have recently become the stage for a medieval festival. The fortress is a subject of Mickiewicz's penultimate poem in his 1826 cycle of Crimean Sonnets.

In 1475, Cembalo City was conquered by the Turks and was subsequently renamed Balyk-Yuva (Fish's Nest) which then became Balaklava.

During the Russo-Turkish War, 1768-1774, the Russian troops invaded Crimea in 1771. Thirteen years later, Crimea was definitively annexed by the Russian Empire. After that, the Crimean Tatar and Turkish population was forcefully replaced by Greek Orthodox people from the Archipelago.

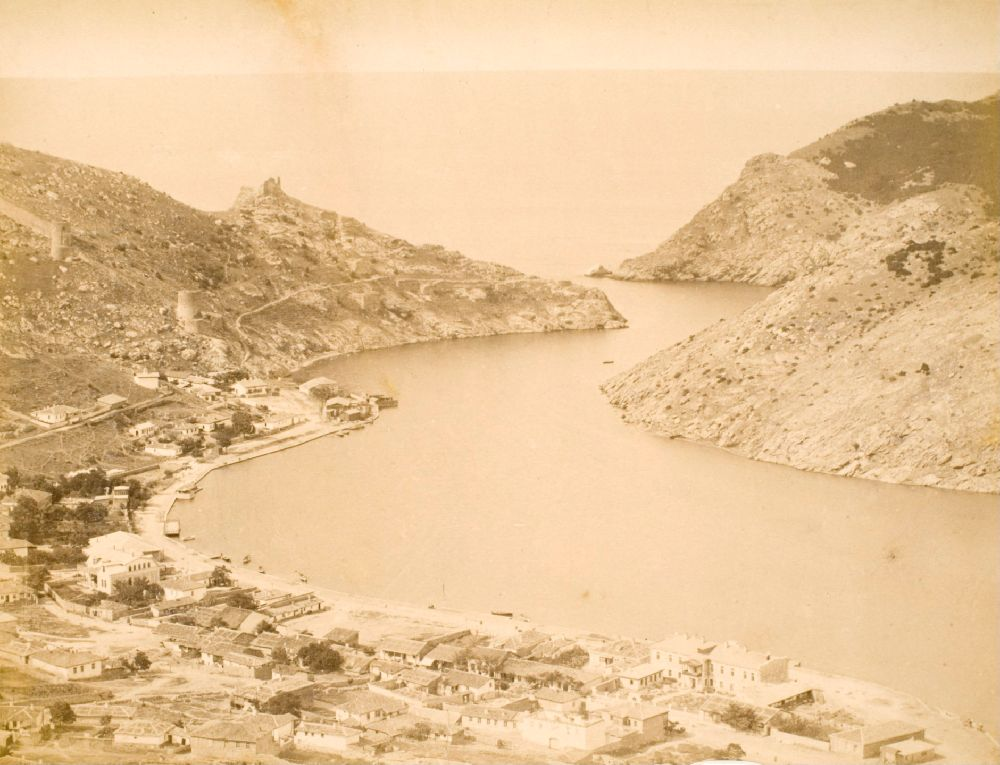
View of harbor in Balaklava in 1889, Department of Image Collections, National Gallery of Art Library, Washington, DC

The town became famous for the Battle of Balaclava during the Crimean War thanks to the suicidal Charge of the Light Brigade, a British cavalry charge due to a misunderstanding sent up a valley strongly held on three sides by the Russians, in which about 250 men were killed or wounded, and over 400 horses lost, effectively reducing the size of the mounted brigade by two thirds and destroying some of the finest light cavalry in the world to no military purpose. Alfred, Lord Tennyson immortalized the battle in verse in his Charge of the Light Brigade.

The balaclava, a tight knitted garment covering the whole head and neck with holes for the eyes and mouth, also takes its name from this settlement, where soldiers first wore them. Also numerous towns founded in English-speaking countries in later parts of the 19th century were named "Balaklava" (see Balaklava (disambiguation)).

In 1954, Balaklava, together with the whole of Crimea, was transferred from the Russian FSFR to the Ukrainian SSR. In 1957 it was formally incorporated into the municipal borders of Sevastopol by the Soviet government and lost city status. Upon the break-up of the USSR, the town, along with the entire Crimean peninsula, became constituent parts of the modern state of Ukraine. There are dozens of monuments in the town dedicated to the remembrance of military valor in past wars, including the Great Patriotic War, the Crimean War and the Russian Civil War.

Since the internationally unrecognized 2014 annexation of Crimea by the Russian Federation, Balaklava, along with rest of Crimea, is administered by Russia. In 2019 Russian authorities granted Balaklava status of a city within Sevastopol.

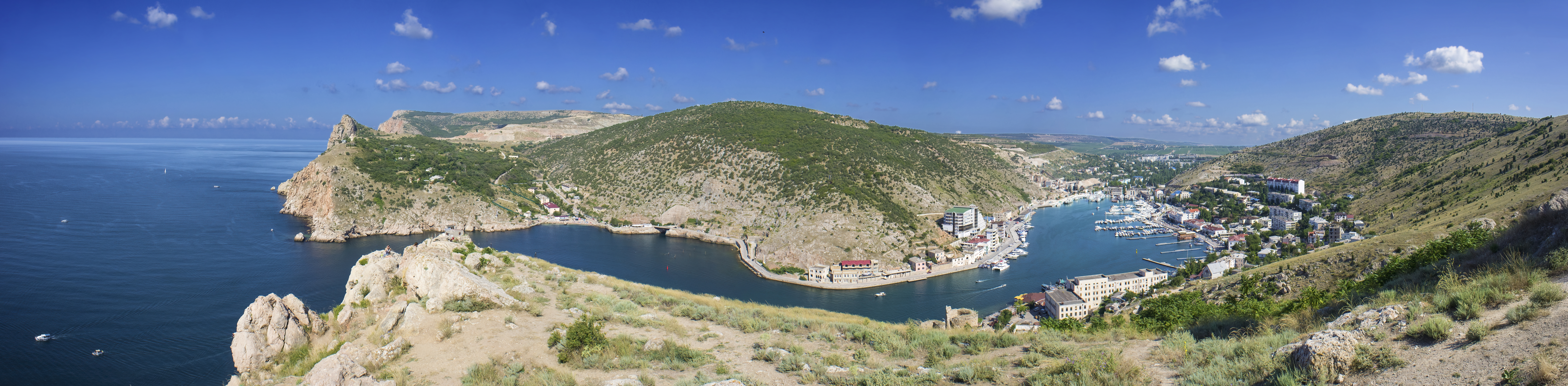
Balaklava Bay

== Underground submarine base ==
One of the monuments is an underground, formerly classified submarine base that was operational until 1993. The base was said to be virtually indestructible and designed to survive a direct atomic impact. During that period, Balaklava was one of the most secret residential areas in the Soviet Union. Almost the entire population of Balaklava at one time worked at the base; even family members could not visit the town of Balaklava without a good reason and proper identification. The base remained operational after the collapse of the Soviet Union in 1991 until 1993 when the decommissioning process started. This process saw the removal of the warheads and low-yield torpedoes. In 1996, the last Russian submarine left the base. The base has since been opened to the public as the Naval museum complex Balaklava.

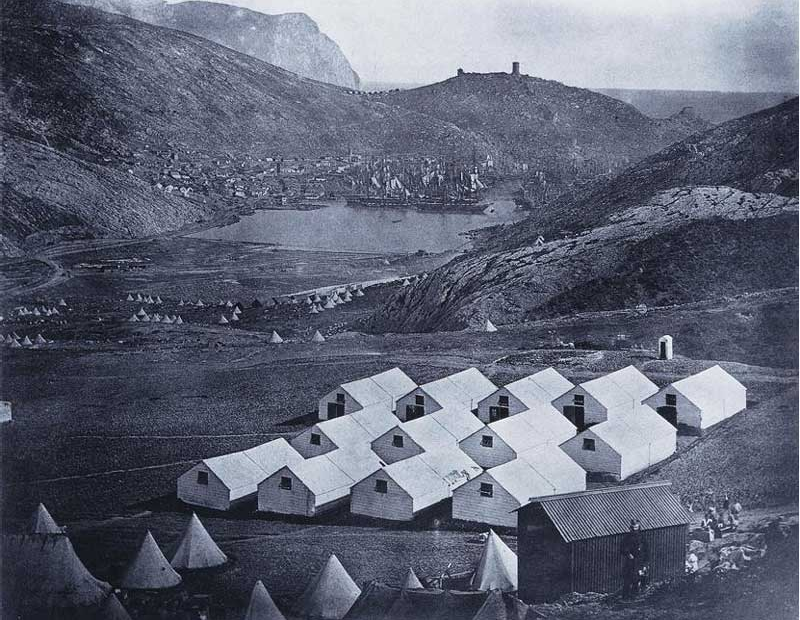
Army camp at Balaklava during the Crimean War

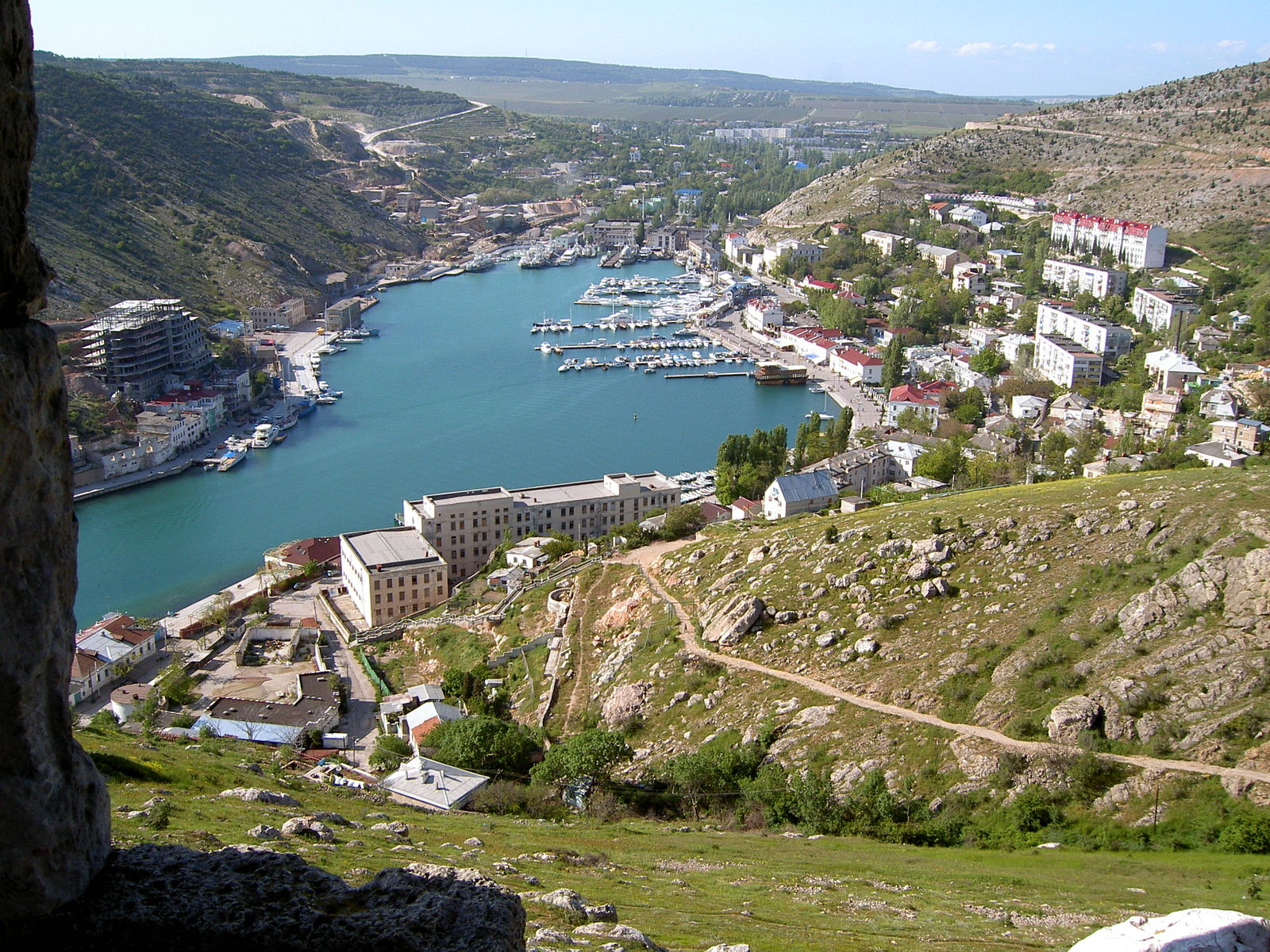
Modern Balaklava - view from the Genoese fortress

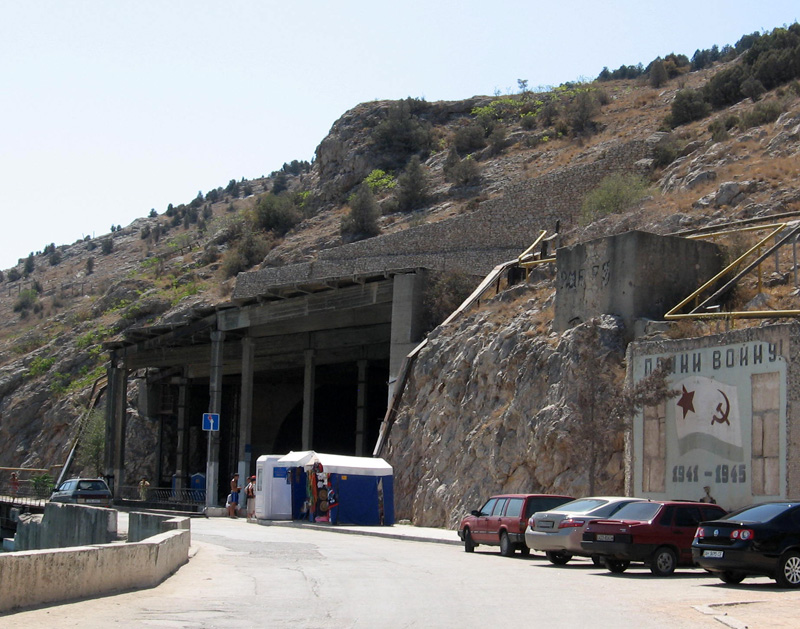
Entrance to submarine Soviet navy base

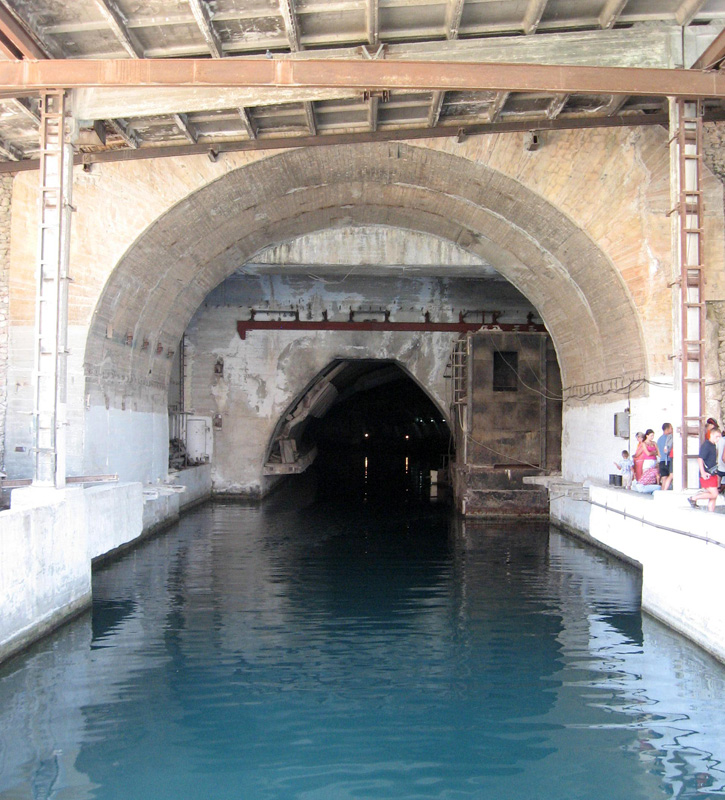
Tunnel

== See also ==
- Cape Aya – a headland near Balaklava known for its scenic grottoes
- Great Storm of 1854
- Hicks Withers-Lancashire
