= Adjungbilly Creek =

River in Australia

Adjungbilly
- Location of the Adjungbilly Creek mouth in New South Wales

Location
- Country: Australia
- State: New South Wales
- Region: South Eastern Highlands (IBRA), Riverina, South Western Slopes
- LGAs: Snowy Valleys, Cootamundra-Gundagai
- Town: Adjungbilly

Physical characteristics
- Source: Adjungbilly Swamp
  - location: near Tumorrama
  - coordinates: 35°10′44″S 148°24′54″E
  - elevation: 888 m (2,913 ft)
- Mouth: confluence with Tumut River
  - location: near Darbalara
  - coordinates: 35°1′28″S 148°11′45″E
  - elevation: 225 m (738 ft)
- Length: 46 km (29 mi)

Basin features
- River system: Murrumbidgee catchment, Murray–Darling basin
- Tributaries
  - left: Sandy Creek (Adjungbilly)

The Adjungbilly Creek, a mostly–perennial river that is part of the Murrumbidgee catchment within the Murray–Darling basin, is located in the South Western Slopes and Riverina regions of New South Wales, Australia.

== Course and features ==
The Adjungbilly Creek (technically a river) rises in the Adjungbilly Swamp, near Tumorrama, on the western slopes of the Australian Alps, and flows generally northwest in a highly meandering course before reaching its confluence with the Tumut River, near Darbalara, approximately 2 kilometres (1.2 mi) above its junction with the Murrumbidgee River. The creek descends 664 metres (2,178 ft) over its 46-kilometre (29 mi) course.

== See also ==
- List of rivers of New South Wales (A–K)
- Rivers of New South Wales
