= Balaclava Mine =

Gold mine in Australia

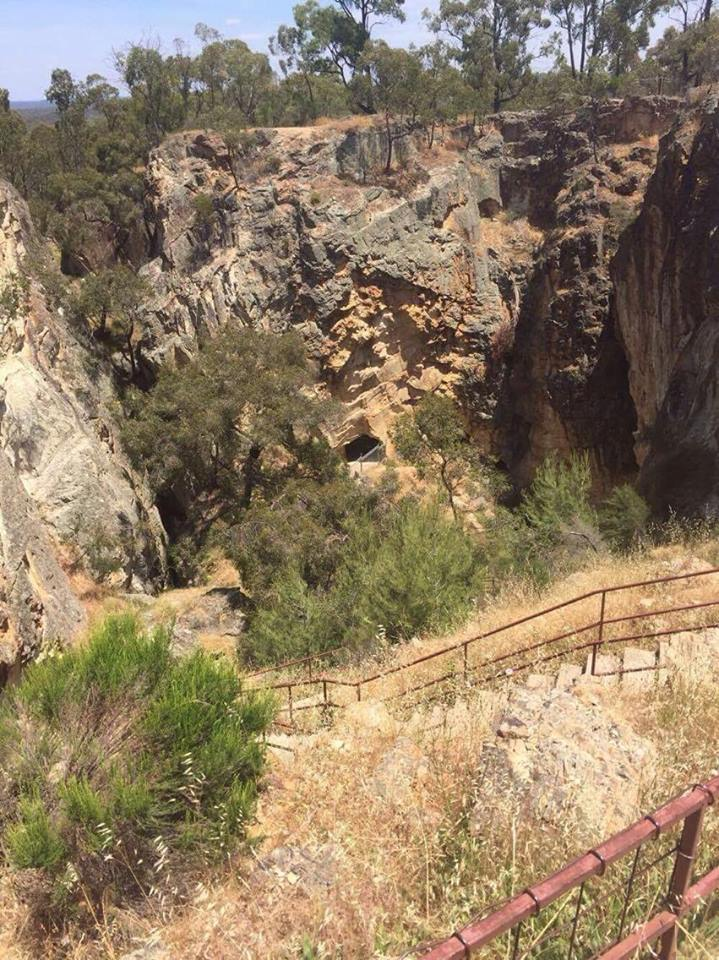
- Balaclava Mine in 2016

- Location within Victoria
- Location: Whroo, Victoria, Australia; 36°38′43″S 145°1′23″E
- Products: Gold
- Production: £6000
- Financial year: year
- Type: Open cut
- Greatest depth: 125m
- Opened: 1854
- Closed: 1920s
- Company: John Lewis, Archibald Menzies

The Balaclava Mine was an open-cut mine in the Australian ghost town of Whroo, Victoria. It opened in October 1854, one year after gold was found at the nearby Rushworth. By 1881 the number of employed miners in the area had dropped to 150, and mining in the Balaclava Mine ceased in the 1920s. The site now operates as a tourist attraction.

== History ==
John Thomas Lewis and James Meek Nickinson, two sailors, found a gold nugget in the grass at Whroo in October 1854. This happened to be the same month as the Battle of Balaclava in the Crimean War, thus the name of the mine. Lewis and Nickinson opened the mine under a partnership, hiring 100 men in this first year. The profits from the first year totalled some £15,000. In 1857 Nickinson left the partnership, leaving Lewis to operate on his own. In following years the amount of gold mined dropped, and by 1859 the now Balaclava Hill Quartz Mining Co. was making only £6000 per year. By 1881, there were only 150 employed miners in the Rushworth area. By the 1920s, there was little recorded activity at the Balaclava mine, and operations ceased.

The 1980s saw attempts to have the mine historically listed and protected. However, these attempts failed. The open-cut mine now operates as a tourist attraction, though the tunnel through the mine wall has recently shut for safety reasons.
