= Lake Albert (New South Wales) =

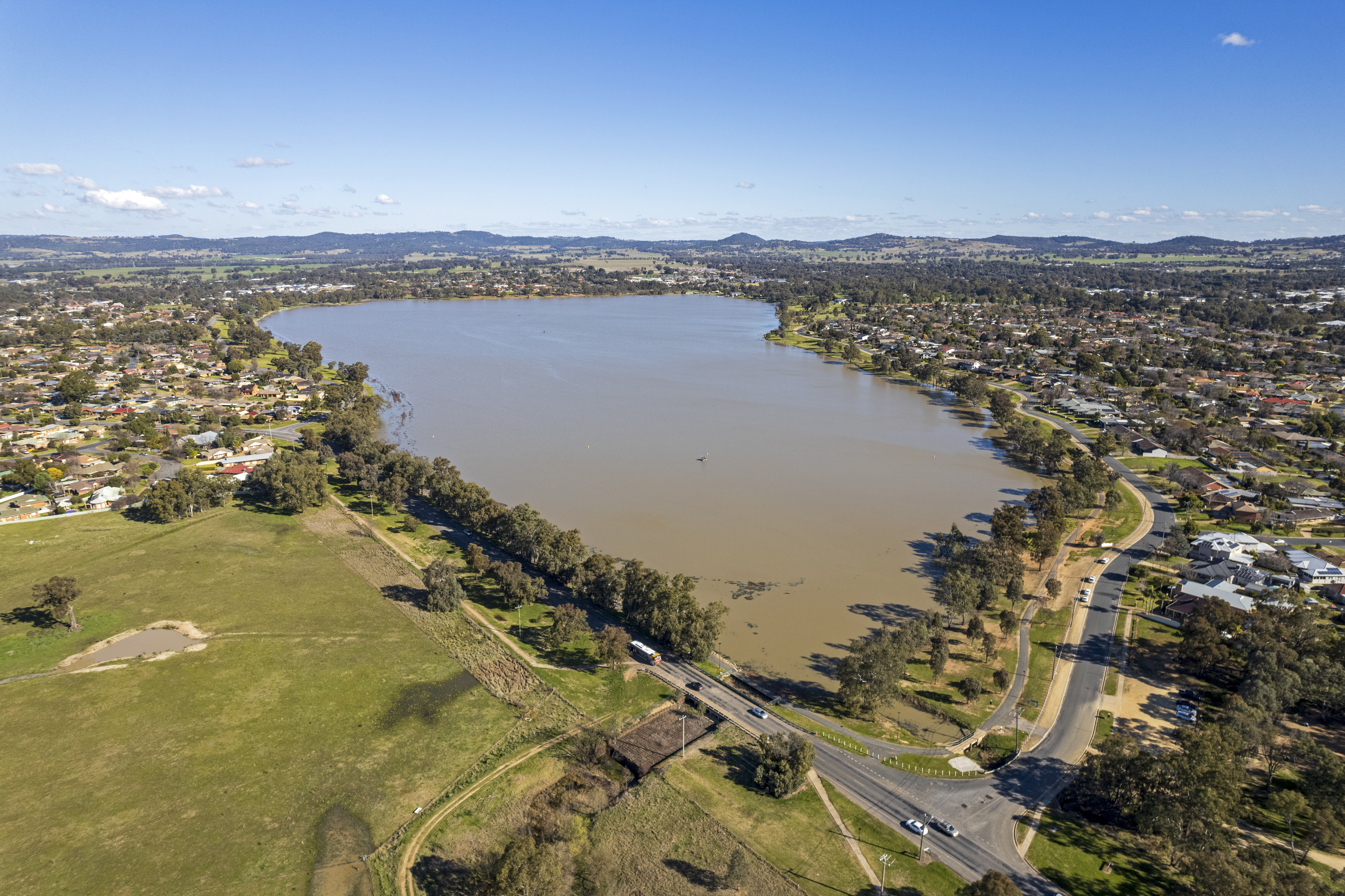
- Aerial view

- Location within New South Wales
- Location: New South Wales
- Coordinates: 35.1670°S 147.3730°E
- Lake type: artificial lake
- Primary inflows: Crooked and String Bark creeks
- Primary outflows: Evaporation
- Catchment area: 76.46 km^{2} (29.52 sq mi)
- Basin countries: Australia
- Managing agency: Wagga Wagga City Council
- Designation: Recreational
- Built: 1890s
- Surface area: 125 ha (310 acres)
- Average depth: 3.6 m (12 ft)
- Settlements: Lake Albert

Lake Albert is an artificial lake in the suburb of Lake Albert in Wagga Wagga in New South Wales, Australia. Covering 125 ha, the lake was built in 1868 on what was known as Swampy Plains and was named after Prince Albert.

Surrounded by parkland, the lake is a venue for water sports, fishing, walking and bird watching. The lake is home to the Boat Club and one of the city's two golf courses, Wagga Wagga Country Club, is situated on the western shore of the lake.

== History ==
=== Events ===
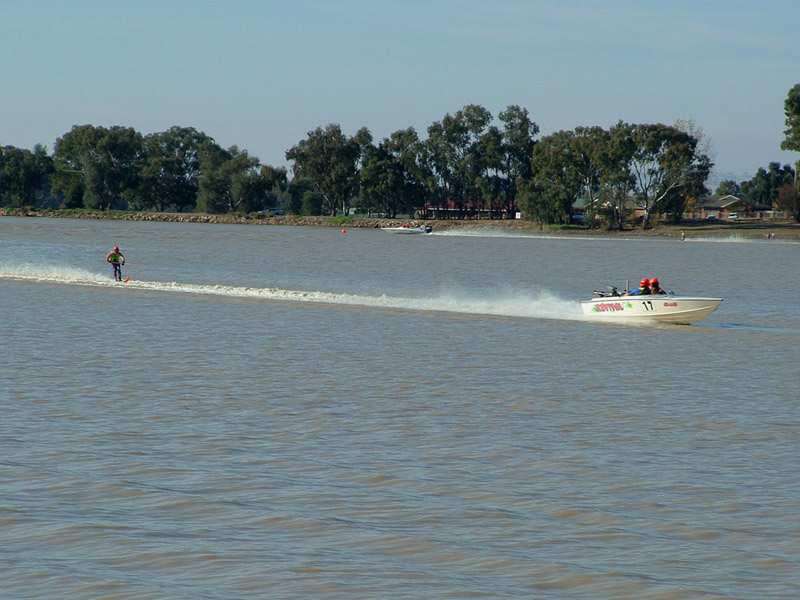
Barry Carne Memorial Ski Race in May 2006.

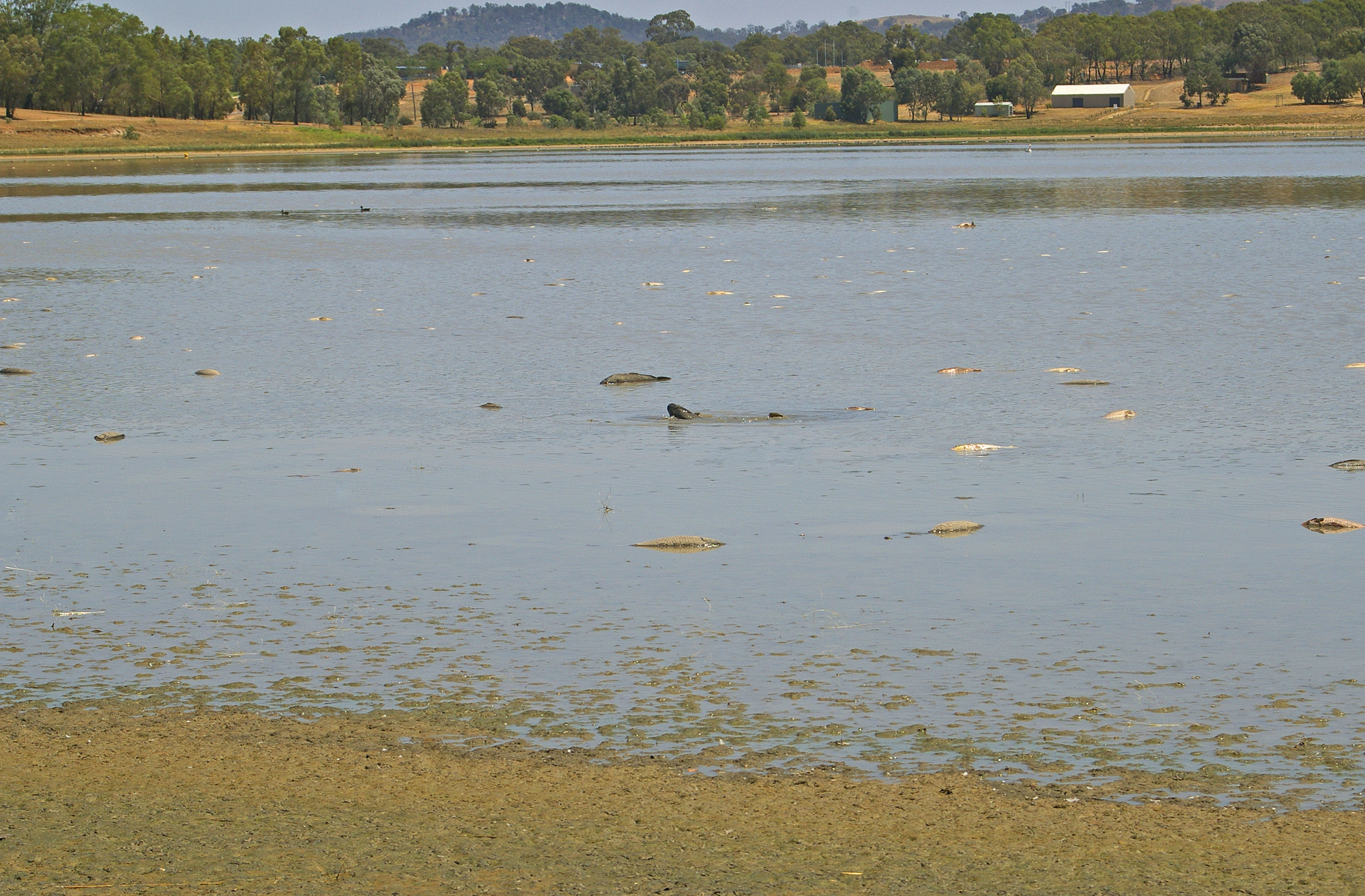
Dead and dying European carp in the lake.

On 8–9 May 1976, the Water Ski Challenge Shield was held on the lake for the first time which was formed by Zone 5 of the New South Wales Ski Association and the Wagga Boat Club. On 9 May 1976, Australian Ski and Victorian trial champion, Barry Carne from the Melbourne suburb of Lower Templestowe, died when he collapsed and cart wheeled up to twelve times during the sixth lap of the final heat of the ski challenge.

The Barry Carne Memorial Ski Race was held on the second Saturday and Sunday in May of each year, subject to water levels in the lake. On 13 and 14 May 2006 the event returned to Lake Albert after a 4-year absence due to the lake being at record low levels owing to drought but was cancelled in 2007 due to low water levels.

On 12 May 2009, due to the low water levels in the lake the Barry Carne High and Dry event was held. In March 2010 it was announced that Barry Carne Memorial Ski Race would return to the lake on 3rd Saturday and Sunday in May, after record breaking rain had filled that lake.

=== Water levels ===
Due to years of drought the water level at Lake Albert reached record lows and in 2005 Wagga Wagga City Council considered pumping water into the lake to prevent further fish deaths which was ruled out by a senior council official. After a thunderstorm dumped around 50 mm (2.0 in) in the area the lake reached its full depth in early November 2005.

In January 2007, a ban on water sport activities on Lake Albert was likely if the lake's water level drops below 1.2 m (3.9 ft) due to the ongoing drought.

On 20 March 2008, the lake was closed for the second time since January 2008 due to high levels of Faecal Coliforms in the water.

In January 2010, the lake's water levels were at record lows with a large amount of fish, mostly European carp, dying due to the low water levels, blue-green algae and hot weather. With the low water levels and dying fish, residents around the lake fear that a mosquitoes outbreak is possible which could see an outbreak of the Ross River fever.

The lake was expected to be almost dried up by the end of March, however heavy rain fell over the area in mid February which had slightly raised the lake's water level after falling to 200 millimetres (7.9 in).

Record breaking rains in the catchment in March 2010 had raised the lake's level to 2.0 metres (6.6 ft), the deepest since 2006.

=== Silt removal ===
On 23 March 2009, local businesses volunteered time and equipment with the Wagga Wagga City Council paying $30,000 in fuel costs, began to remove silt on the northern end of the lake with 8,000 m^{3} (280,000 cu ft) of silt to be removed and used at the Wagga Wagga Exhibition Centre (Equex) for spectator mounds.

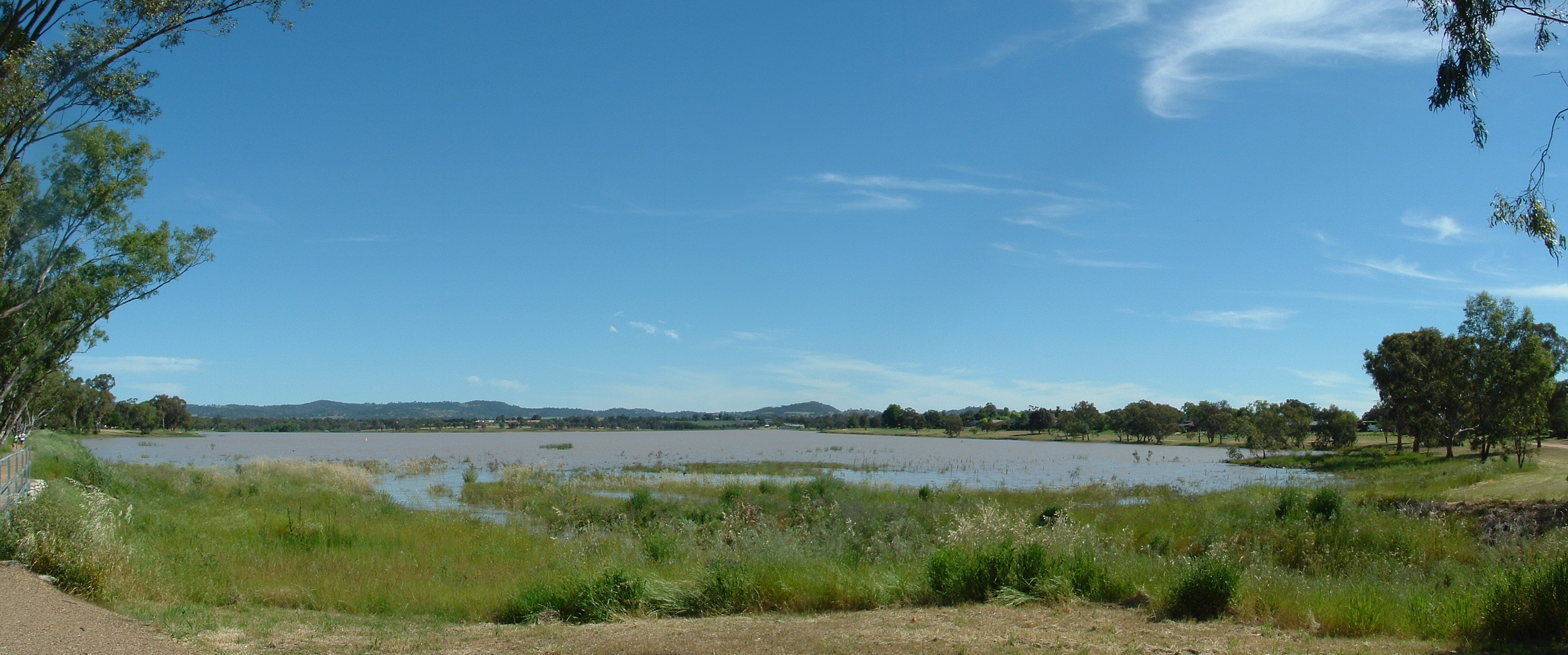
Lake Albert on 4 November 2005

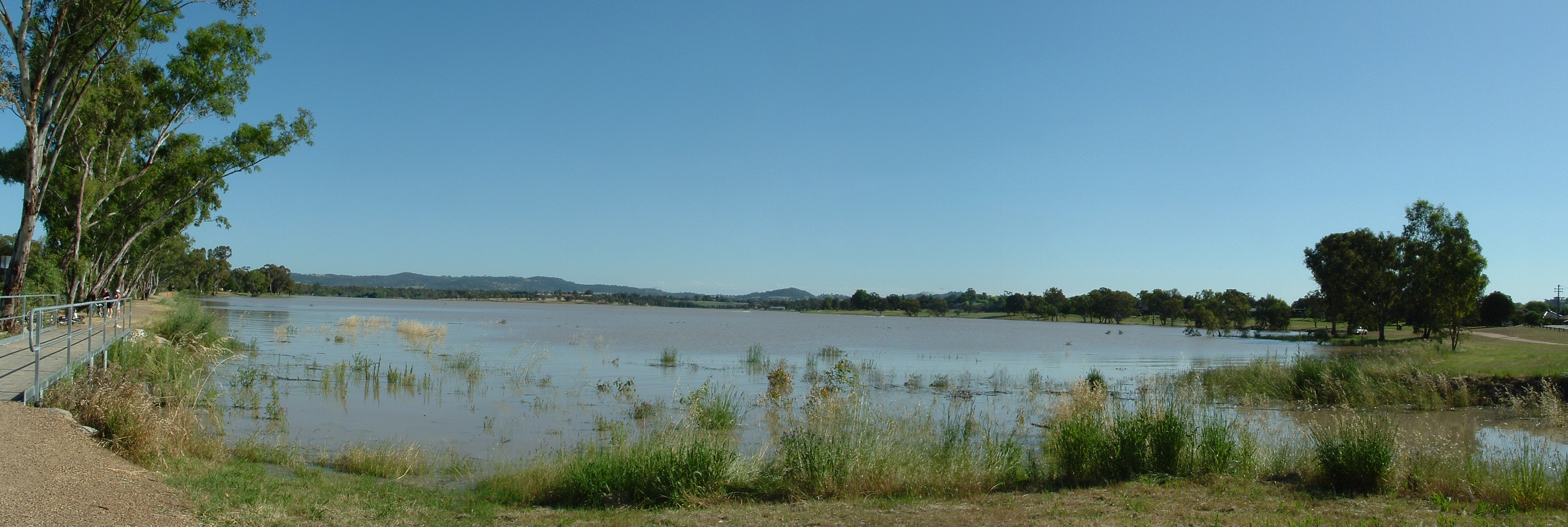
Lake Albert 100% full on 9 November 2005

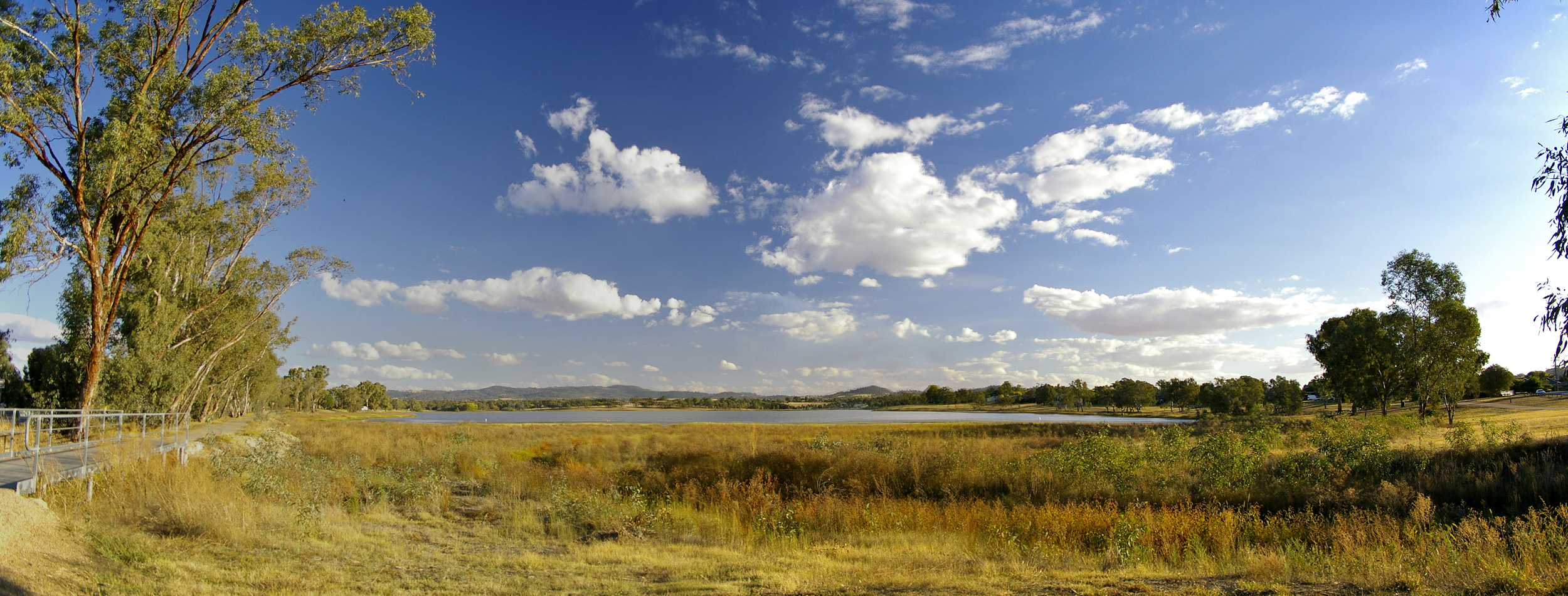
Panorama view of the lake taken on 31 March 2008

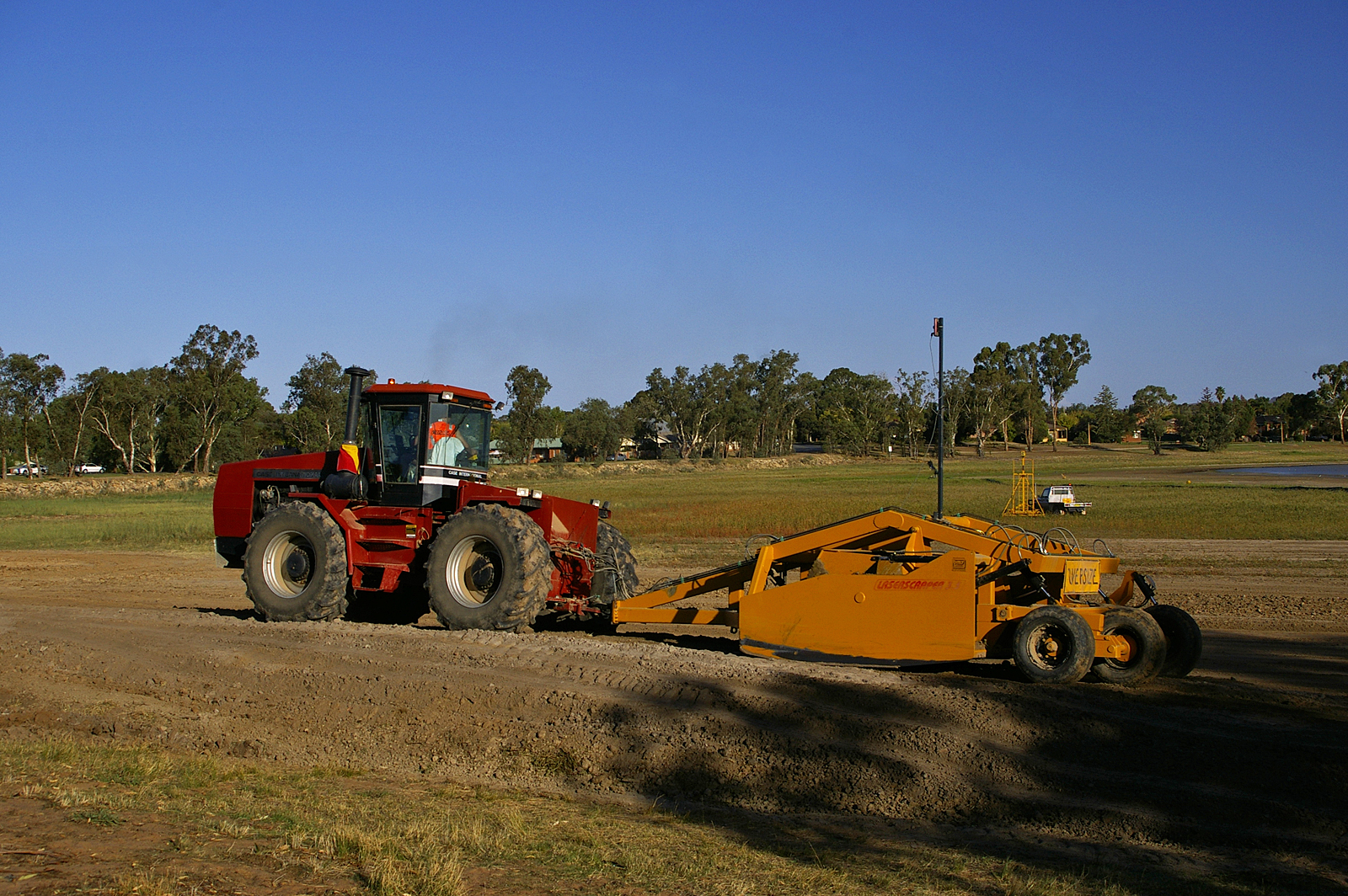
A pull scraper with a laser leveler, removing silt from the northern end
