= Whroo =

- Town
- Coordinates: 36°39′S 145°1′E
- Country: Australia
- State: Victoria
- Region: Hume
- LGAs: Shire of Campaspe; Shire of Strathbogie

Government
  - State electorate: Euroa
  - Federal division: Nicholls

Population
  - Total: 45 (2021 census)
- Postcode: 3612

Whroo is a locality in the Shire of Strathbogie and Shire of Campaspe, Victoria, Australia. The locality includes the Whroo Historical Area state reserve.

== History ==
The first inhabitants of the area were the Ngooraialum people. The first European explorer to enter the Goulburn Valley was Thomas Mitchell. The first Europeans to visit the area were the drovers Joseph Hawdon and Charles Bonney. Squatters started settling the area in 1840.

Two sailors – John Thomas Lewis and James Meek Nickinson discovered a gold nugget in the grass at Whroo in 1854, leading to the development of the town of Whroo. The Balaclava Mine then operated on and off and officially closed in the 1960s. Thought to be derived from an Aboriginal word meaning lips, the first school opened in 1857 and by 1900 had a Mechanics' Institute and library with 950 volumes opened in 1859 and closed in 1955, Presbyterian and United Methodist churches, three hotels, a cordial factory and three ore crushing mills.
