= Rushworth, Victoria =

Rushworth
- Town
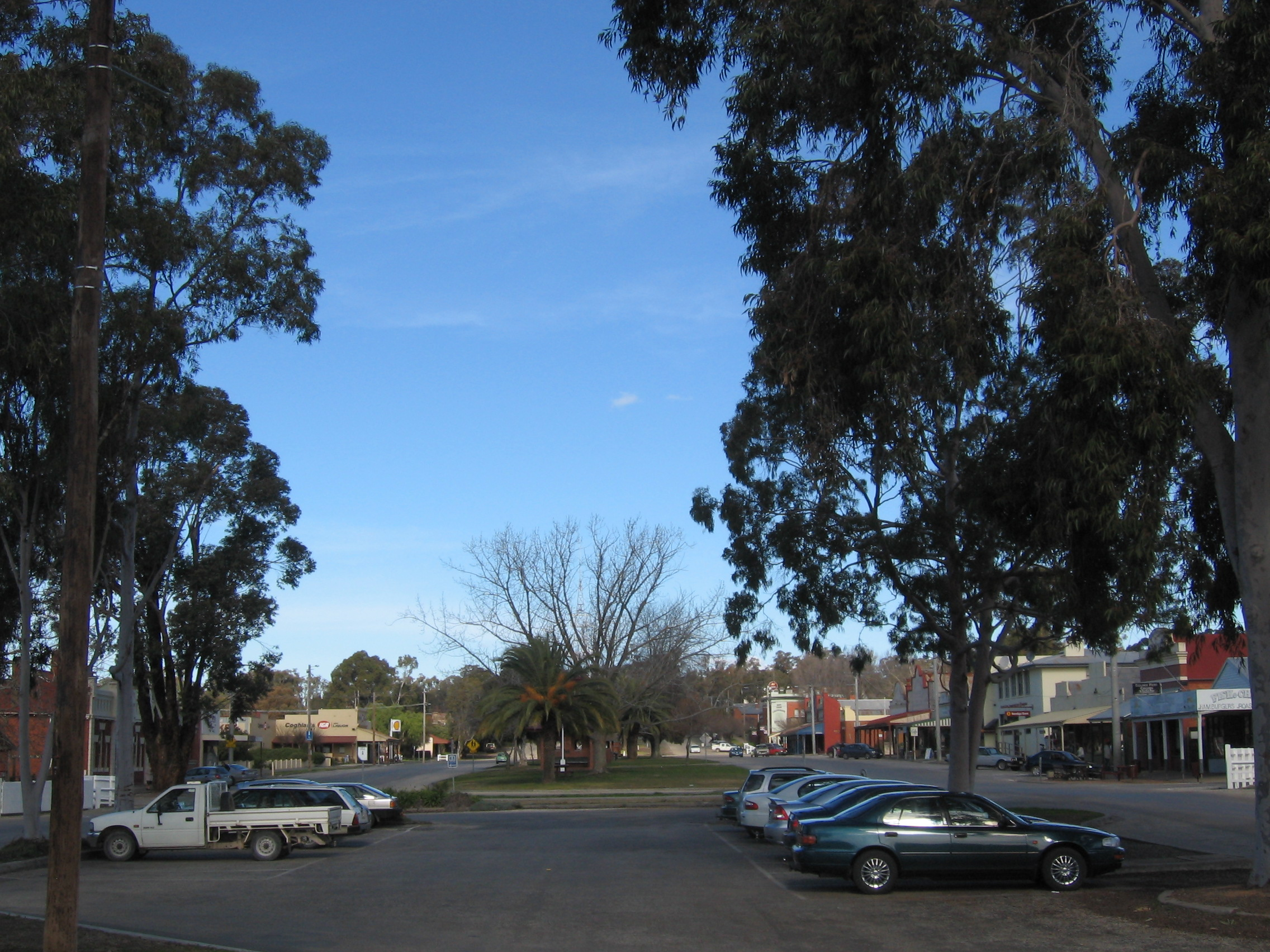
- Main street

- Interactive map of Rushworth
- Coordinates: 36°35′0″S 145°01′0″E
- Country: Australia
- State: Victoria
- LGA: Shire of Campaspe
- Location: 157 km (98 mi) N of Melbourne; 47 km (29 mi) SW of Shepparton
- Established: 1853

Government
  - State electorate: Euroa
  - Federal division: Nicholls

Population
  - Total: 1,411 (2021 census)
- Postcode: 3612

Rushworth is a town in Victoria, Australia. It is located 157 kilometres (98 mi) north of Melbourne and, at the 2021 Census, had a population of 1,411.

== History ==
Rushworth was established during the Victorian gold rush in 1853. It was named by poet and later local Goldfields Commissioner Richard Henry Horne in 1854. Its post office opened on 16 September 1857.

The goldfields became no longer viable due to the underground water table and were closed during the gold rush.

After World War 2, a migration camp was set up approximately 8km outside of town in 1947. It was called Rushworth Immigration Camp No. 3 (on the site of the previous wartime internment camp) and received migrants from Bonegilla before closing in June 1953.

The Rushworth Magistrates' Court closed on 1 January 1990.

== Athletics ==
The town has an Australian rules football team competing in the Kyabram & District Football League.

Golfers play at the course of the Rushworth Golf Club on Tatura Road.

== Gallery ==
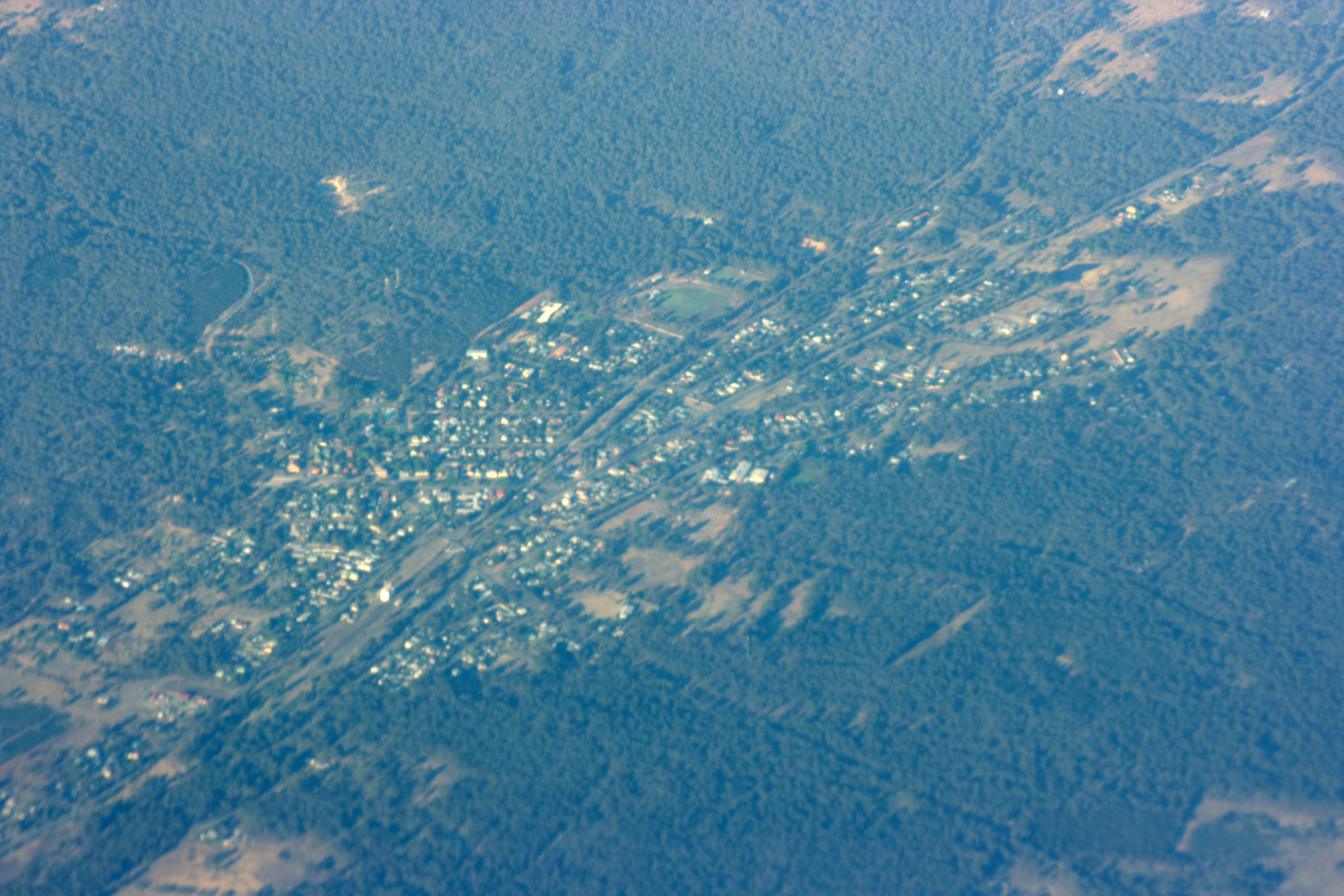
Aerial Picture

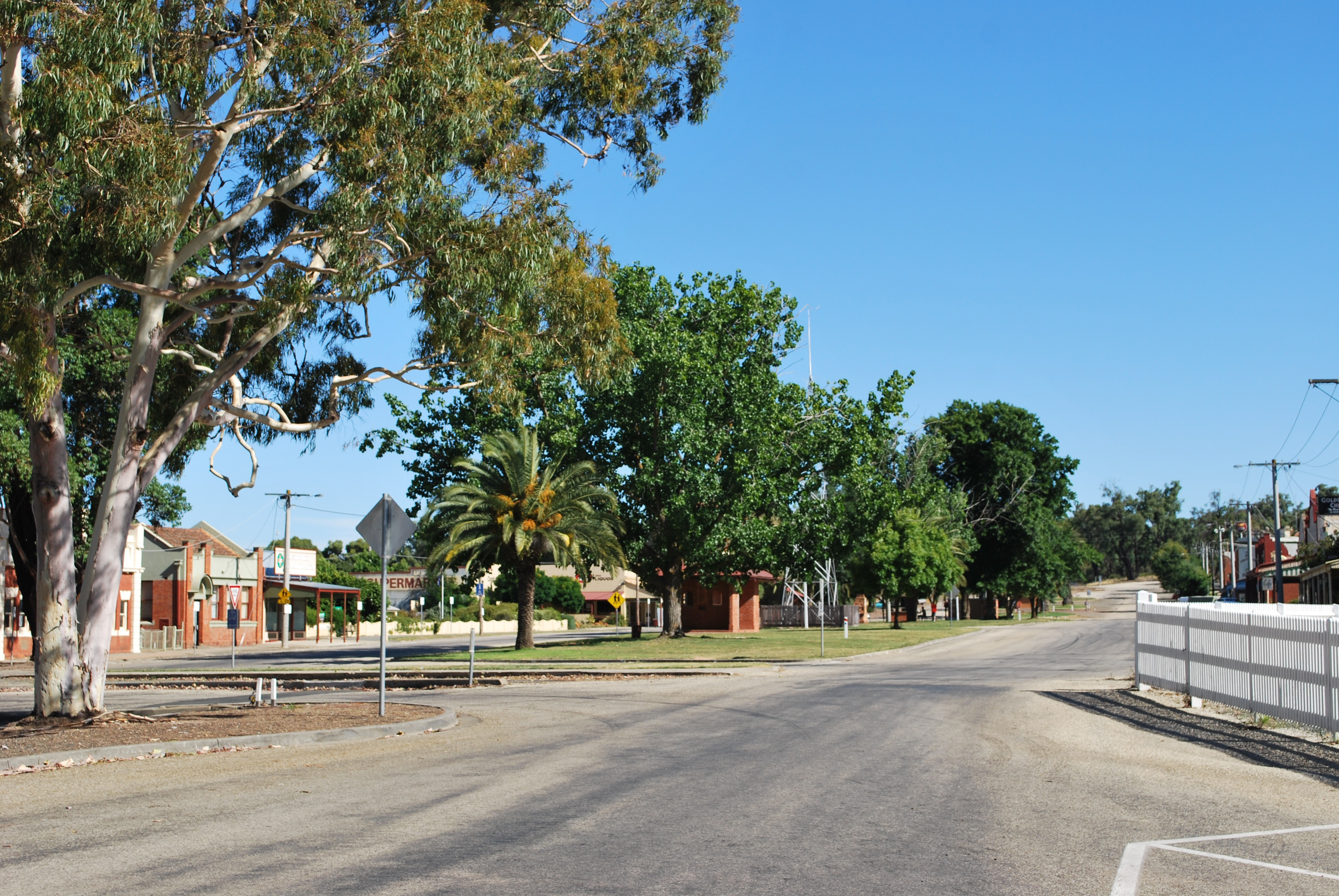
Main Street

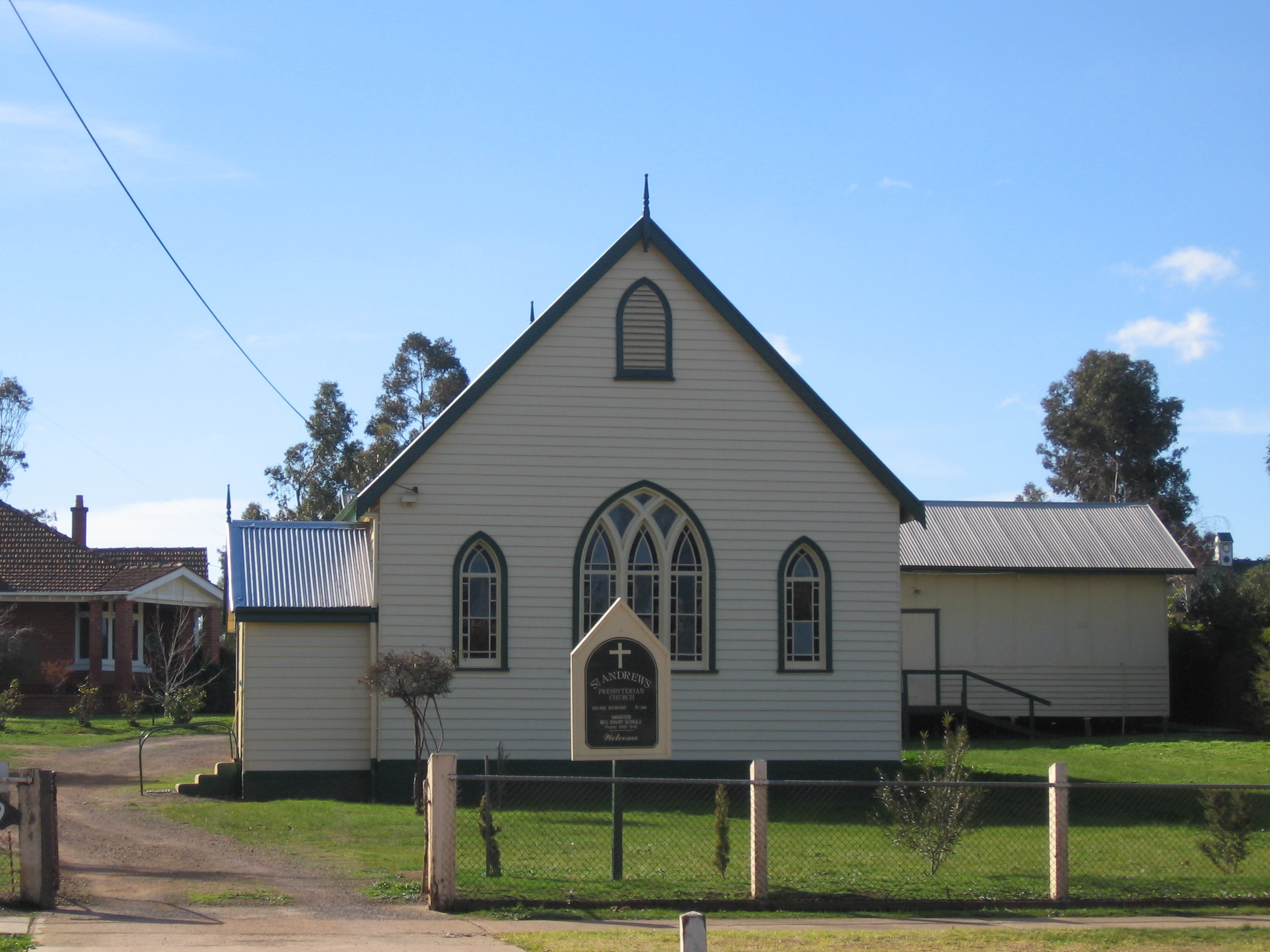
Presbyterian Church

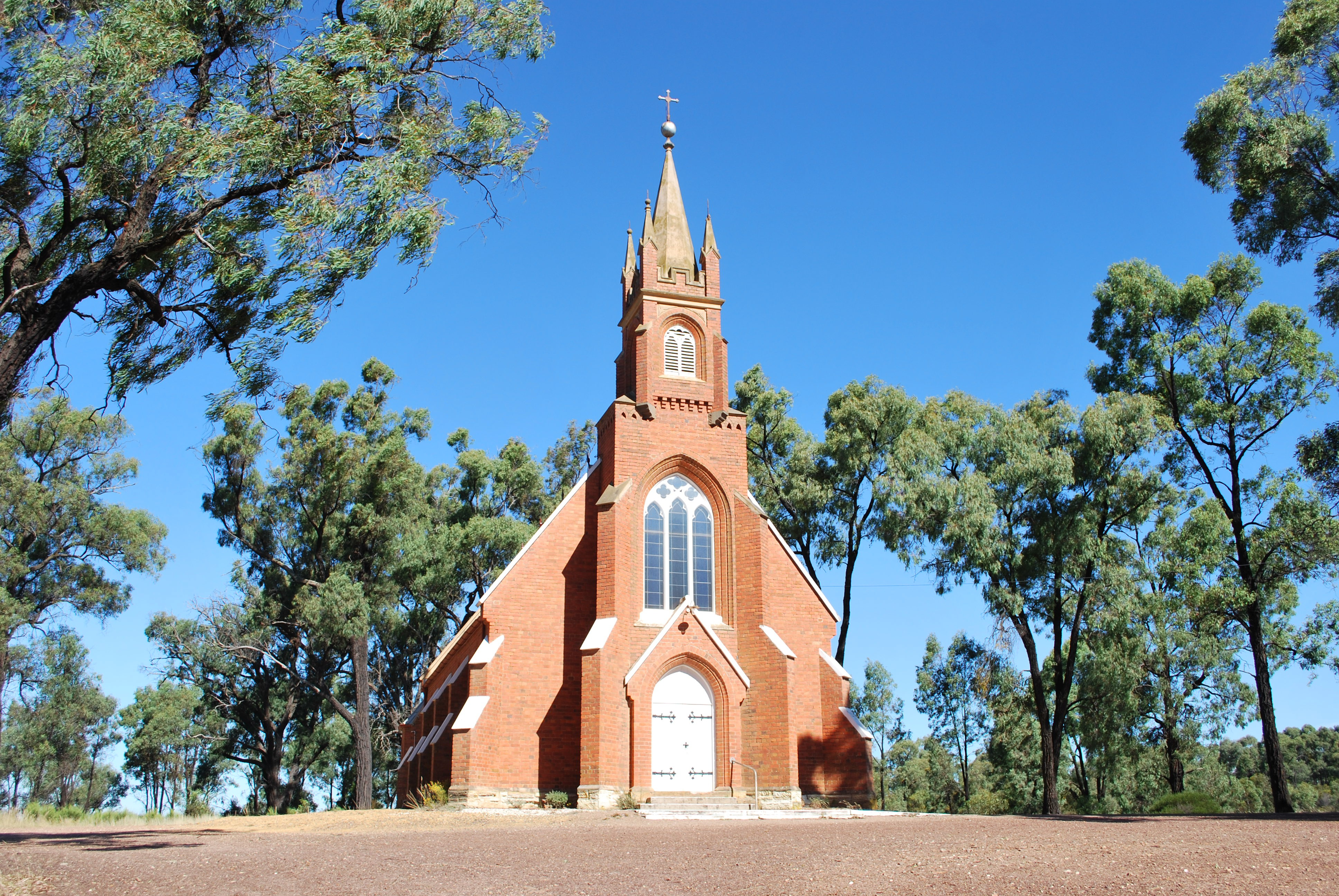
Anglican Church

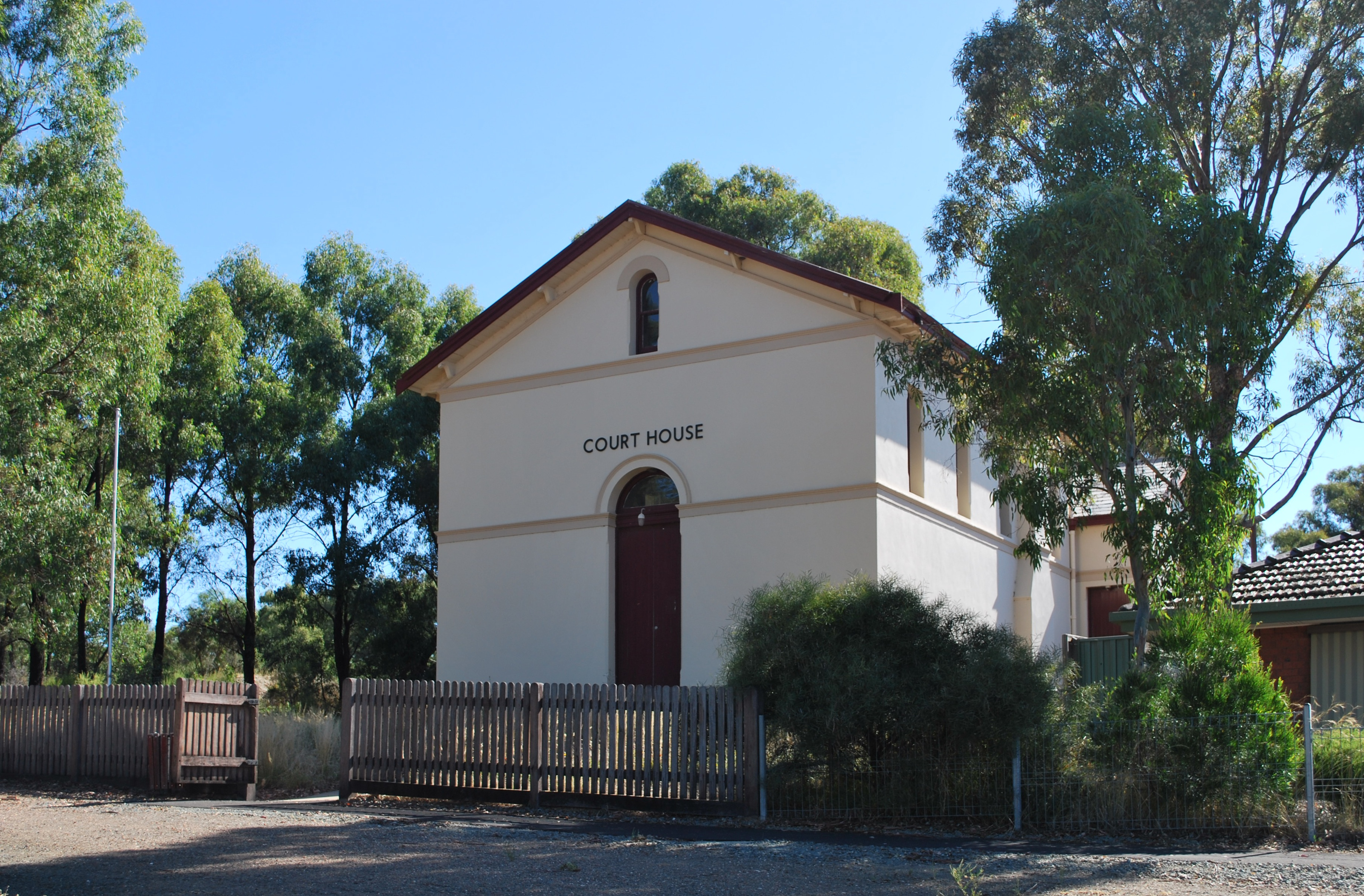
Court House

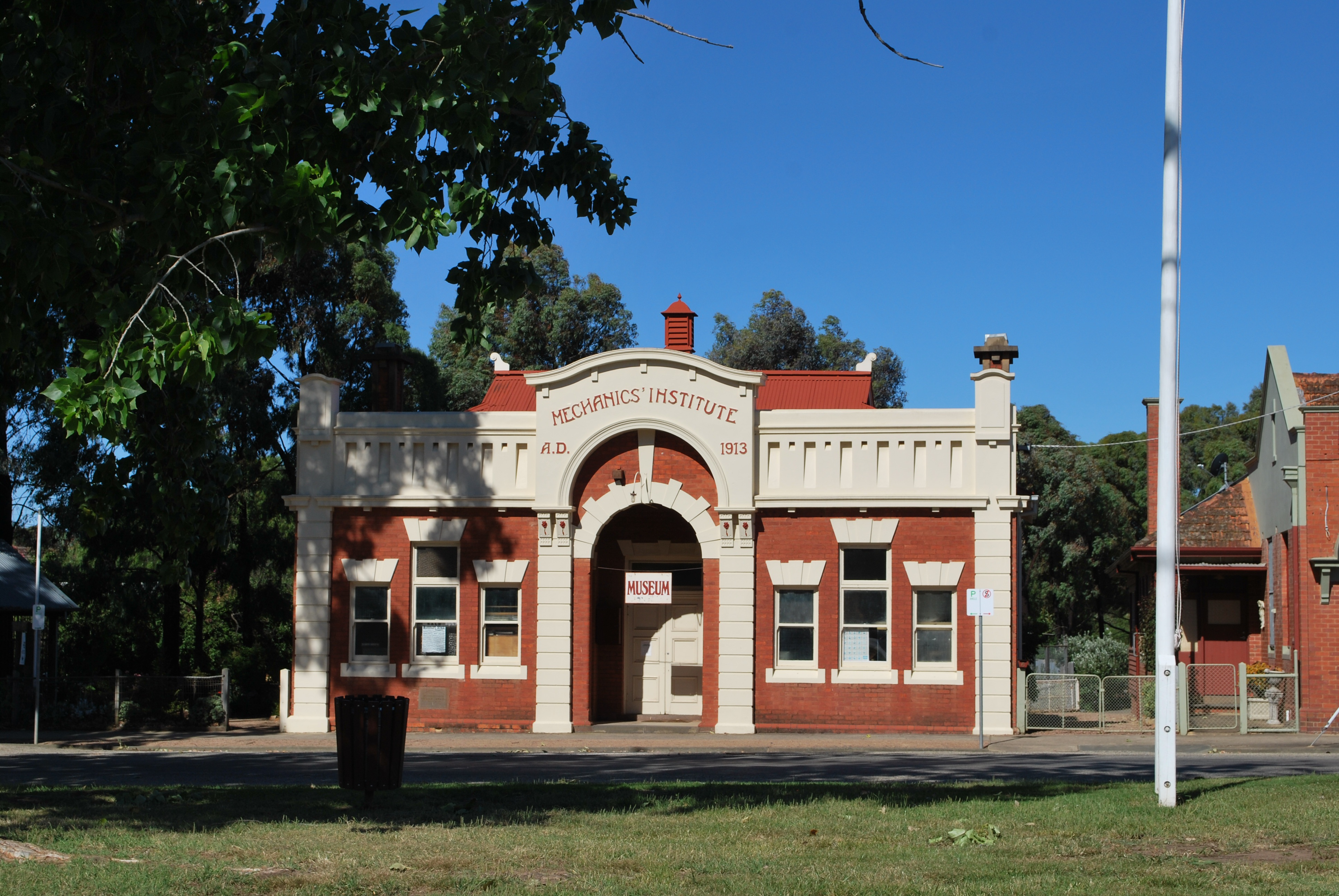
Mechanics Institute

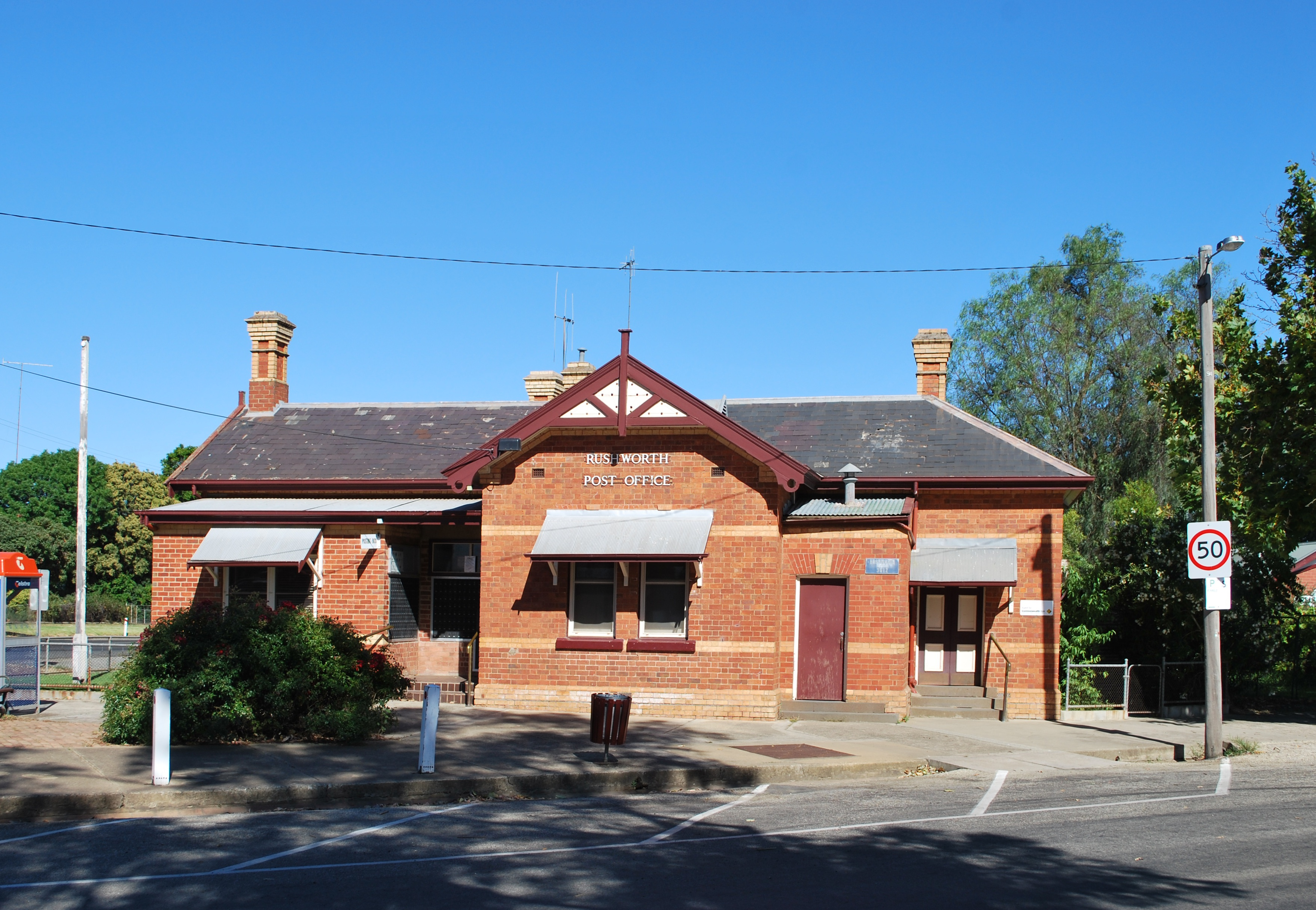
Post Office

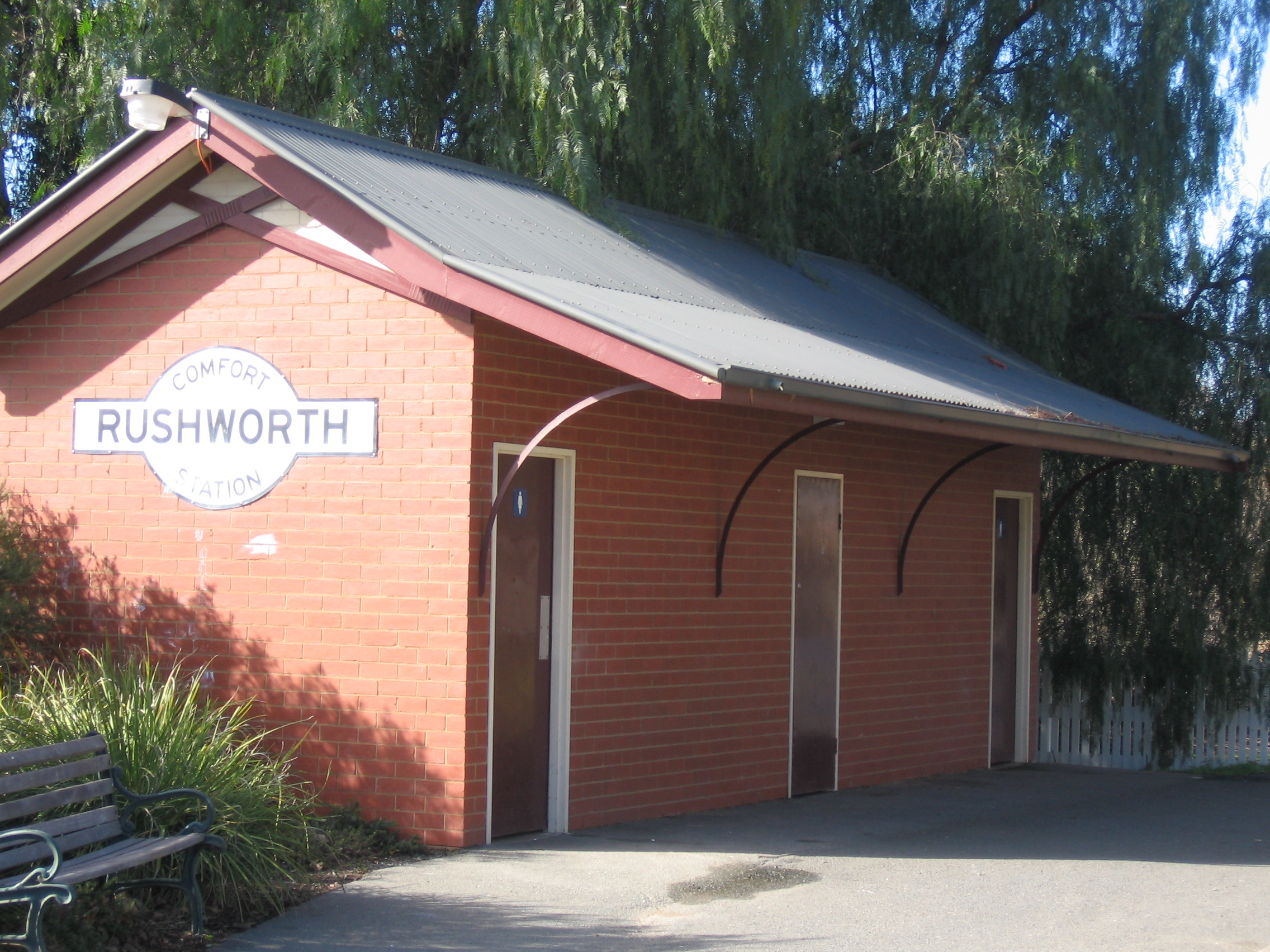
Public Toilet

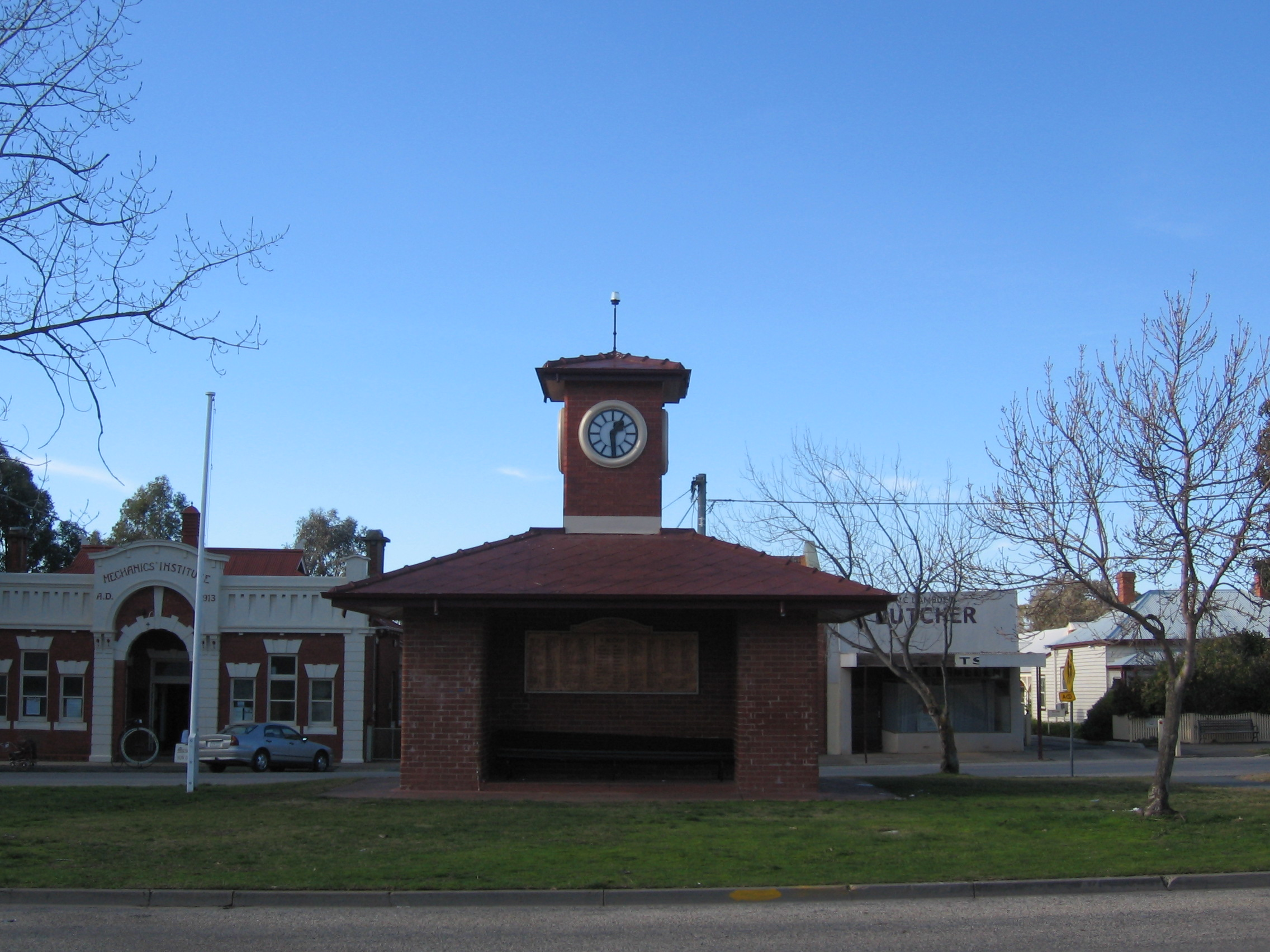
War Memorial

== See also ==
- Whroo, Victoria
- Balaclava Mine
