= List of places on the Victorian Heritage Register in the Shire of Strathbogie =

This is a list of places on the Victorian Heritage Register in the Shire of Strathbogie in Victoria, Australia. The Victorian Heritage Register is maintained by the Heritage Council of Victoria.

The Victorian Heritage Register, as of 2026, lists the following fifteen state-registered places within the Shire of Strathbogie:

Place name	Place #	Location	Suburb or Town	Co-ordinates	Built	State registered	Photo
Blacksmiths Shop and Residence	VHR H1376	22 Main Street	Strathbogie	36.856572°S 145.735306°E	c. 1892	20 November 1997	
Bridge over Hughes Creek	VHR H1445	Old Hume Highway	Avenel	36.907361°S 145.233472°E	1859	20 August 1982	
Calder Woodburn Memorial Avenue	VHR H1975	Goulburn Valley Highway	Arcadia; Kialla West; Kialla; Arcadia South	36.582806°S 145.337361°E	1945-49	6 December 2001	
Cameron's Sawmill	VHR H2017	Reedy Lake Road	Bailieston	36.702861°S 145.088000°E	1877	20 March 2003	
Chateau Tahbilk	VHR H0296	254 O'Neils Road	Tabilk	36.825192°S 145.085026°E	1860	9 October 1974	
Chinamans Bridge	VHR H1449	Nagambie-Heathcote Road over the Goulburn River	Nagambie	36.789111°S 145.123778°E	1891	21 December 1988	
Euroa Court House	VHR H0960	99 Binney Street	Euroa	36.751944°S 145.571972°E	1892	20 August 1982	
Former National Bank	VHR H2194	1 Binney Street	Euroa	36.748861°S 145.569667°E	1884	12 February 2009	
Former Royal Mail Hotel and Cottage	VHR H0335	26 Henry Street	Avenel	36.908194°S 145.231417°E	1855	9 October 1974	
Killeen Homestead	VHR H1908	224 Longwood-Mansfield Road	Creightons Creek	36.837082°S 145.487217°E	1849	15 March 2001	
Kirwans Bridge	VHR H1886	Kirwans Bridge-Longwood Road over the Goulburn River	Kirwans Bridge	36.745750°S 145.139972°E	1890	20 July 2000	
Noorilim	VHR H0297	205 Wahring-Murchison East Road	Wahring	36.667193°S 145.219556°E	c. 1870	9 October 1974	
Stone Cellar at Faithfull Creek	VHR H0762	Hume Highway	Balmattum	36.720269°S 145.624626°E	1860s	20 December 1989	
Strathbogie Aerial Navaid	VHR H0961	Polly McQuinns Road	Strathbogie	36.864410°S 145.733600°E	1936	25 March 1993	
Welcome Reef Gully Gold Puddling Site	VHR H1248	Mt Camel-Graytown Road	Moormbool West	36.779556°S 144.829528°E	1890s	19 December 1996	
