= Euroa =

- Town
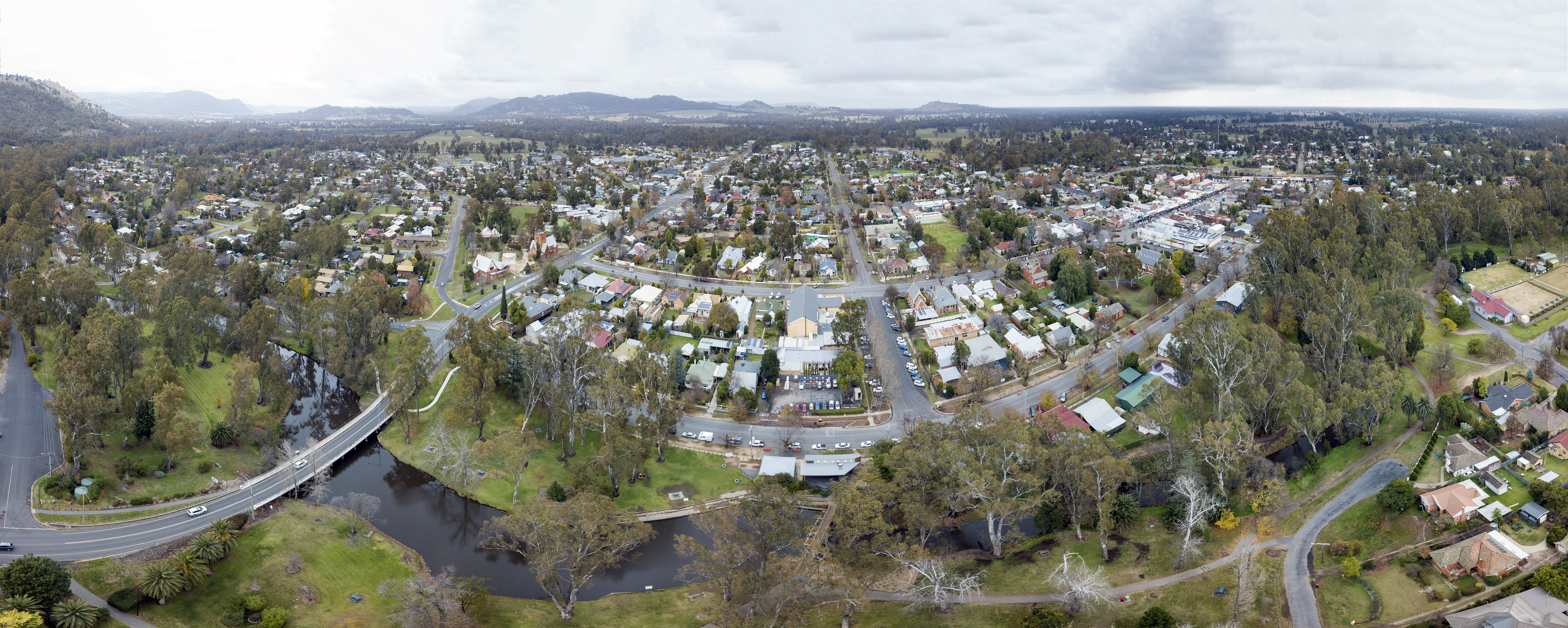
- Aerial panorama of Euroa

- Interactive map of Euroa
- Coordinates: 36°45′S 145°34′E
- Country: Australia
- State: Victoria
- Region: Hume
- LGA: Shire of Strathbogie
- Location: 148 km (92 mi) NE of Melbourne; 49 km (30 mi) SE of Shepparton; 86 km (53 mi) SW of Wangaratta

Government
  - State electorate: Euroa
  - Federal division: Indi
- Elevation: 175 m (574 ft)

Population
  - Total: 3,116 (2021 census)
- Postcode: 3666
- Mean max temp: 21.0 °C (69.8 °F)
- Mean min temp: 9.4 °C (48.9 °F)
- Annual rainfall: 648.9 mm (25.55 in)

Euroa is a town in the Shire of Strathbogie in the north-east of Victoria, Australia. At the 2021 census, Euroa's population was 3,116.

The name Euroa comes from an Aboriginal word in the old local dialect meaning 'joyful'.

== History ==
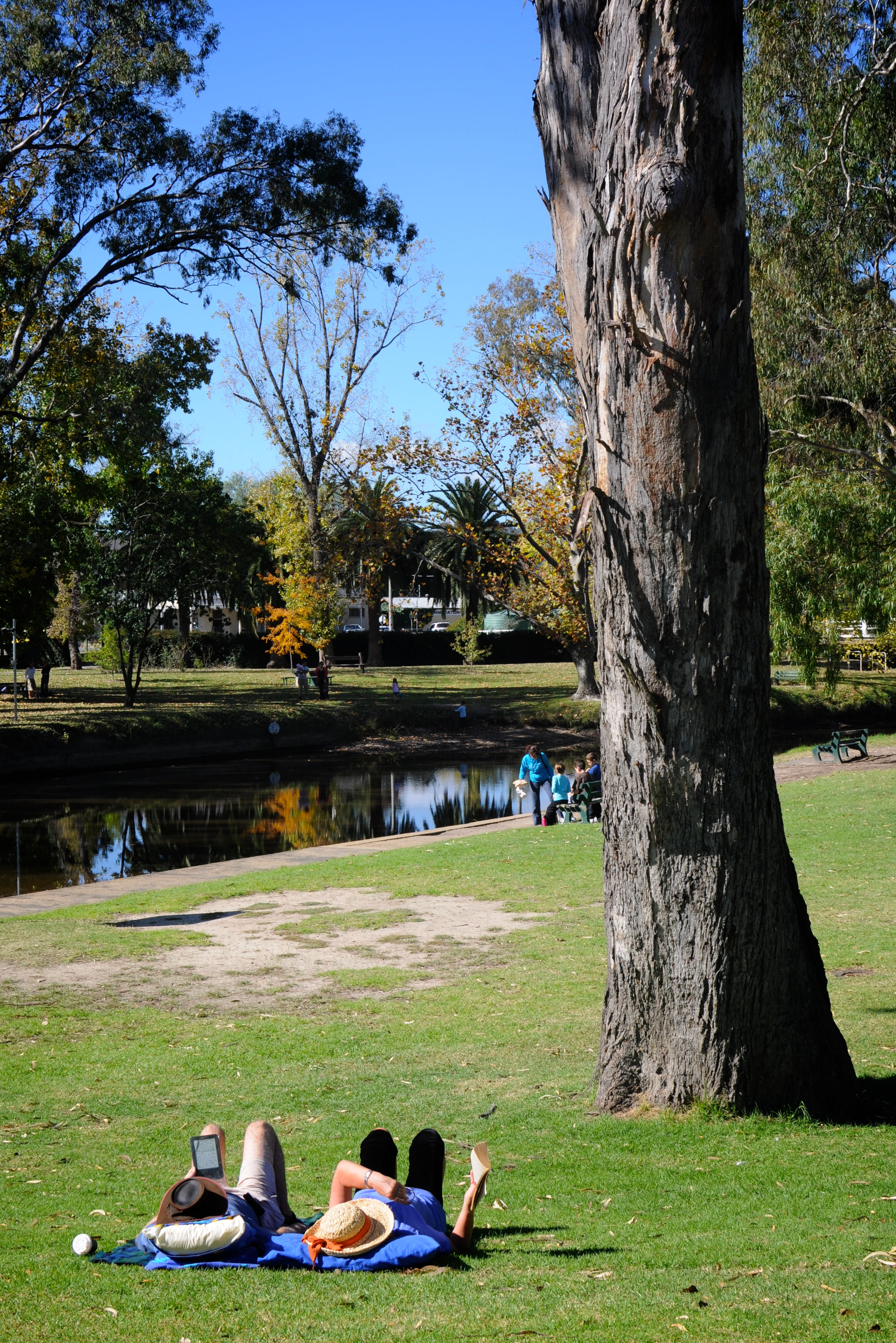
Seven Creeks Park Euroa

Major T.L. Mitchell camped on the banks of the Seven Creeks at Euroa during his 1836 "Australia Felix" expedition. The Post Office opened on 1 January 1854 in the old town, as the township was settled.

Euroa's claim to fame is that the National Bank was robbed by Ned Kelly in 1878. Much of the region's wealth once came from sheep but now it comes from horse studs.

The Euroa Magistrates' Court closed on 1 January 1990.

=== Heritage sites ===
Euroa contains a number of heritage-listed sites, including:

- 1 Binney Street: National Bank of Australasia Building
- 90 Binney Street: Euroa Post Office
- 99 Binney Street: Euroa Court House

== Geography ==
Euroa is roughly midway between Melbourne and Albury. The area is geographically very flat, as the town is located in the huge Goulburn Valley, however the Strathbogie Ranges are not far away.

=== Climate ===
Euroa possesses a humid subtropical climate bordering on an oceanic climate (Köppen: Cfa/Cfb), with very warm, relatively dry summers and cool, wetter winters. Average maxima vary from 29.7 °C (85.5 °F) in February to 12.3 °C (54.1 °F) in July while average minima fluctuate between 15.3 °C (59.5 °F) in January and 4.1 °C (39.4 °F) in July. Mean precipitation is moderately low (averaging 648.9 mm (25.55 in) per annum). Euroa receives 100.6 precipitation days annually, with a maximum frequency of rain in winter. Extreme temperatures have ranged from 42.8 °C (109.0 °F) on 31 January 1968 to −3.5 °C (25.7 °F) on 6 August 1974.

Climate data for Euroa (36.76°S 145.57°E, 178 m AMSL) (1909-1976 normals, extremes 1965-1976)
Month	Jan	Feb	Mar	Apr	May	Jun	Jul	Aug	Sep	Oct	Nov	Dec	Year
Record high °C (°F)	42.8 (109.0)	41.0 (105.8)	39.3 (102.7)	29.6 (85.3)	25.2 (77.4)	20.2 (68.4)	21.0 (69.8)	21.6 (70.9)	26.4 (79.5)	35.0 (95.0)	37.3 (99.1)	39.1 (102.4)	42.8 (109.0)
Mean daily maximum °C (°F)	29.6 (85.3)	29.7 (85.5)	26.3 (79.3)	20.9 (69.6)	16.5 (61.7)	13.1 (55.6)	12.3 (54.1)	13.9 (57.0)	17.1 (62.8)	20.4 (68.7)	24.1 (75.4)	27.6 (81.7)	21.0 (69.7)
Mean daily minimum °C (°F)	14.6 (58.3)	15.3 (59.5)	13.2 (55.8)	9.7 (49.5)	6.8 (44.2)	4.8 (40.6)	4.1 (39.4)	4.9 (40.8)	6.7 (44.1)	8.6 (47.5)	10.7 (51.3)	13.4 (56.1)	9.4 (48.9)
Record low °C (°F)	3.0 (37.4)	7.5 (45.5)	3.0 (37.4)	0.7 (33.3)	−1.1 (30.0)	−2.8 (27.0)	−2.5 (27.5)	−3.5 (25.7)	−1.9 (28.6)	−0.3 (31.5)	1.0 (33.8)	2.7 (36.9)	−3.5 (25.7)
Average precipitation mm (inches)	39.3 (1.55)	32.9 (1.30)	43.7 (1.72)	47.1 (1.85)	61.8 (2.43)	74.8 (2.94)	69.3 (2.73)	70.3 (2.77)	59.7 (2.35)	61.3 (2.41)	46.1 (1.81)	43.2 (1.70)	648.9 (25.55)
Average precipitation days (≥ 0.2 mm)	4.8	4.0	5.1	6.5	9.3	11.8	13.2	13.0	10.5	9.5	6.9	6.0	100.6
Source: Bureau of Meteorology (1909-1976 normals, extremes 1965-1976)

== Facilities ==
The town is home to the Shire of Strathbogie headquarters. The shire was established as part of the conservative Kennett government mass rationalisation across Victoria in the 1990s. Shire of Strathbogie incorporates the former Shires of Euroa, Violet Town, and Goulburn.

The town was bypassed by a deviation of the Hume Highway that was constructed around 1992.

The town is located on the main North East railway, and is served by V/Line passenger services from Euroa station.

== Schools ==
=== St John's Primary School ===
St John's is Euroa's only Catholic primary school and has served the Euroa community since 1921. The school has an approximate enrolment of 180 students and, from its founding until 2002, the school was run by the Sisters of Mercy.

The current principal is Libby Hamilton.

=== Euroa Primary School ===
Euroa Primary School (School Number: 1706) is the town's only government-run primary school. It has an enrolment of 120 students.

=== Euroa Secondary College ===
Euroa Secondary College (School Number: 7820) is the only secondary school in the Shire of Strathbogie and, in 2007, had an enrolment of 371 students. These students come from the surrounding area including Nagambie, Avenel, Longwood, Ruffy and Violet Town. The current principal is Anna Eddy

== Sport ==
The town has an Australian rules football team, the "Euroa Magpies", competing in the Goulburn Valley Football League.

In June 1952, during the 1952 VFL season, a senior Victorian Football League (VFL) game was played at Euroa Oval. The match was organised as part of an effort by the Australian National Football Council (ANFC) to promote the sport, and the other matches in the round were played in Albury, Brisbane, Hobart, Sydney, and Yallourn (all non-standard venues). The match in Euroa drew a crowd estimated at 7,500 people.

Golfers play at the course of the Euroa Golf Club on Walters Road.

== Gallery ==
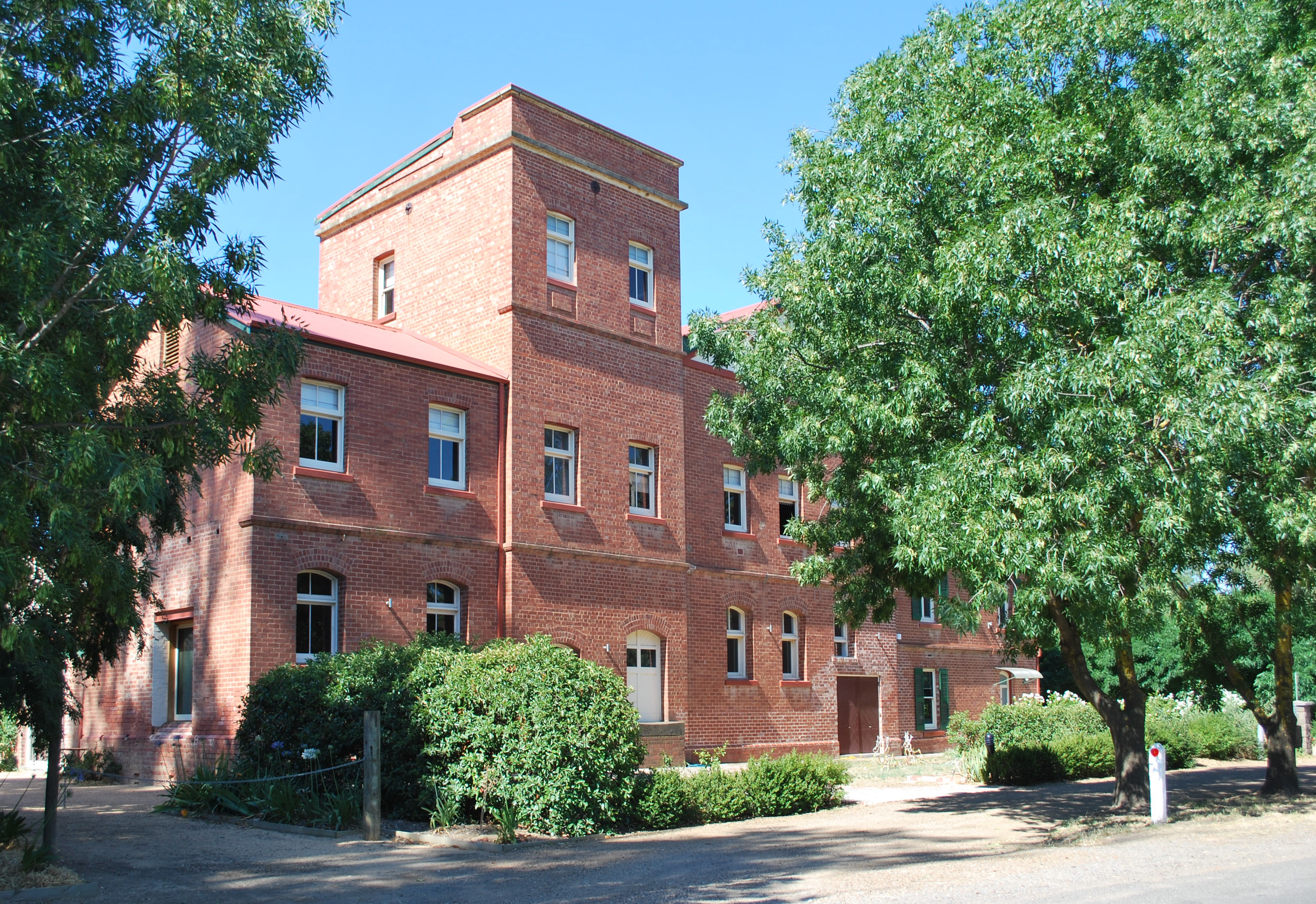
Euroa Butter Factory

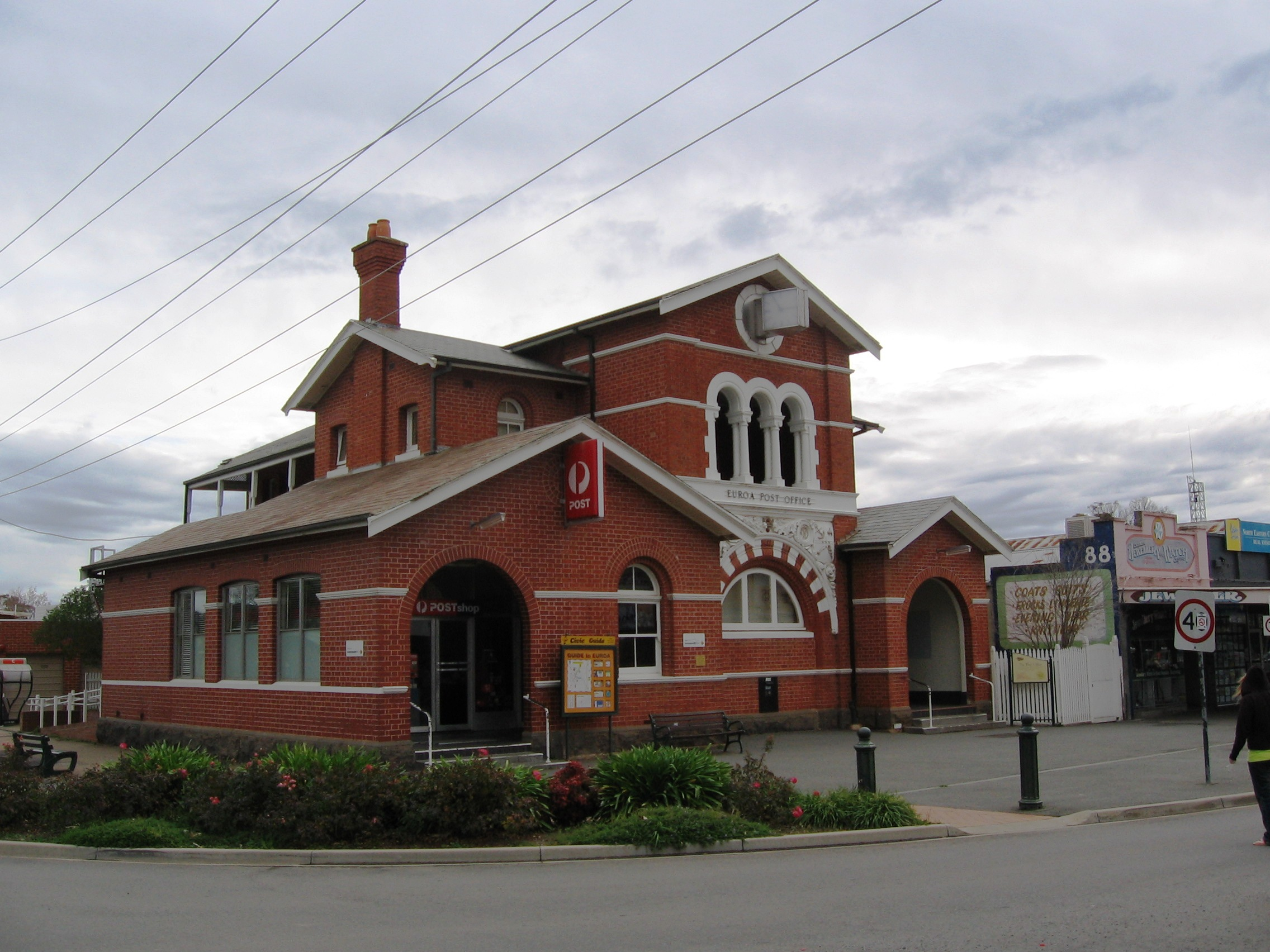
Euroa Post Office

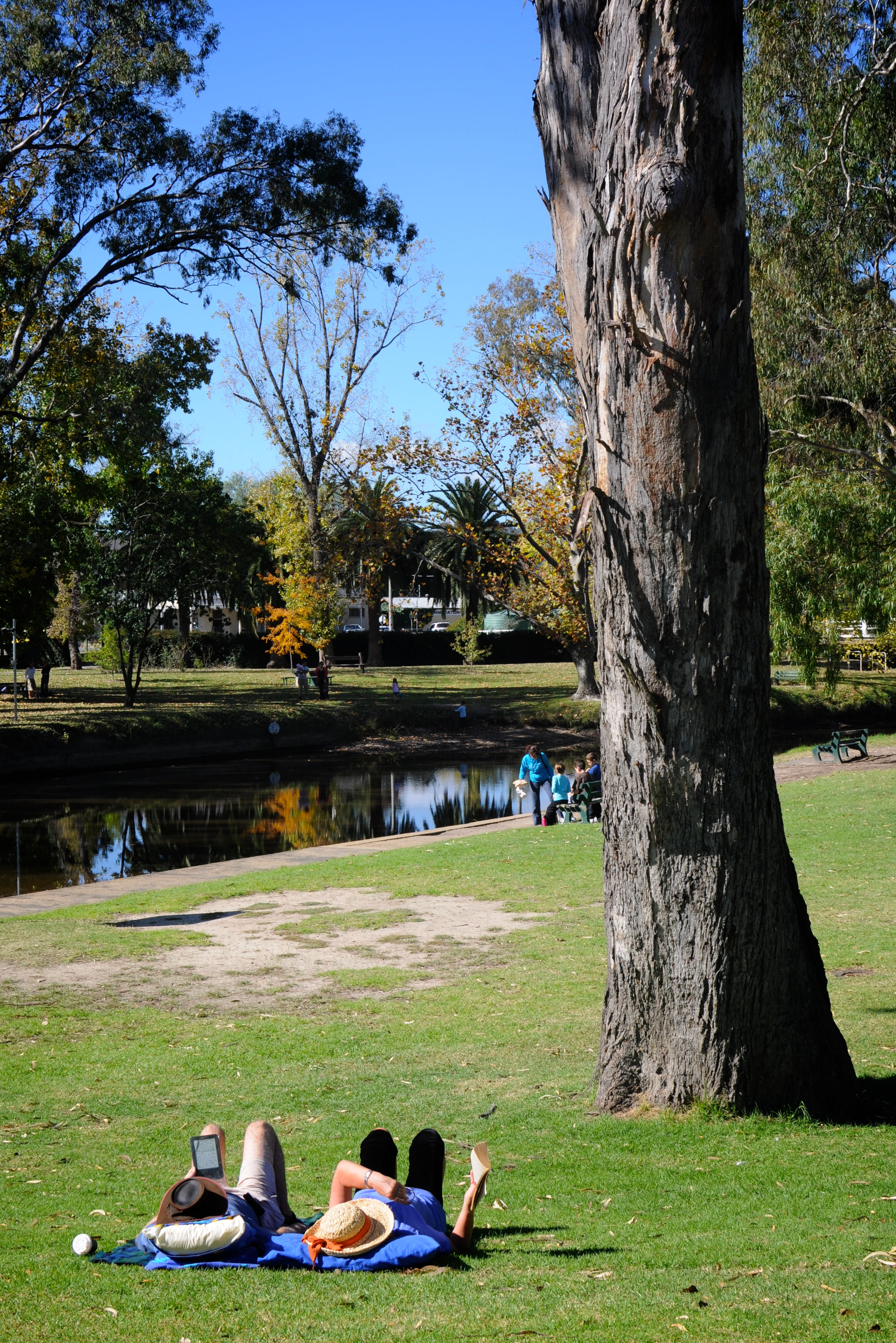
Seven Creeks Park

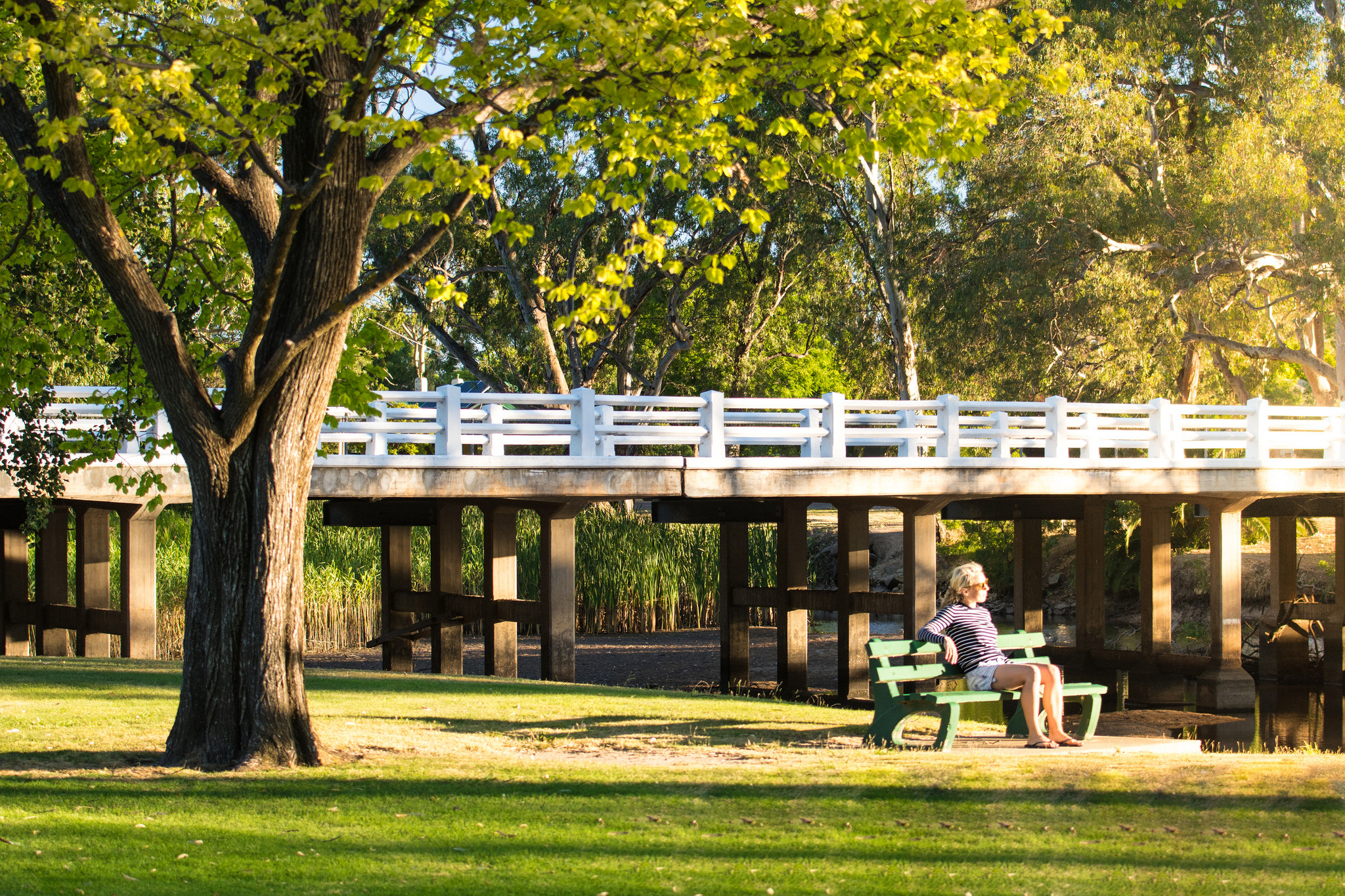
Seven Creeks Park Euroa

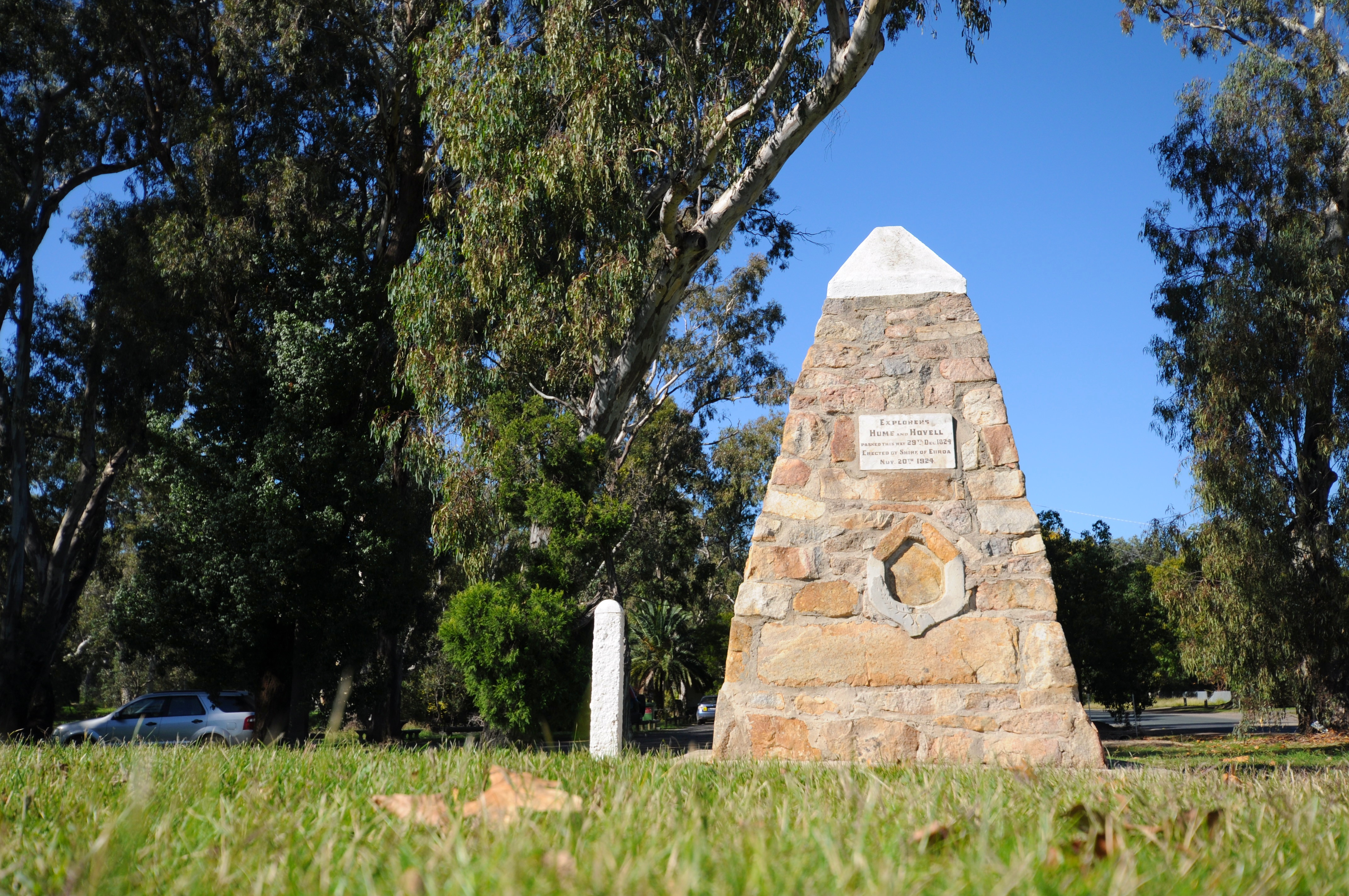
Hume and Hovell Monument

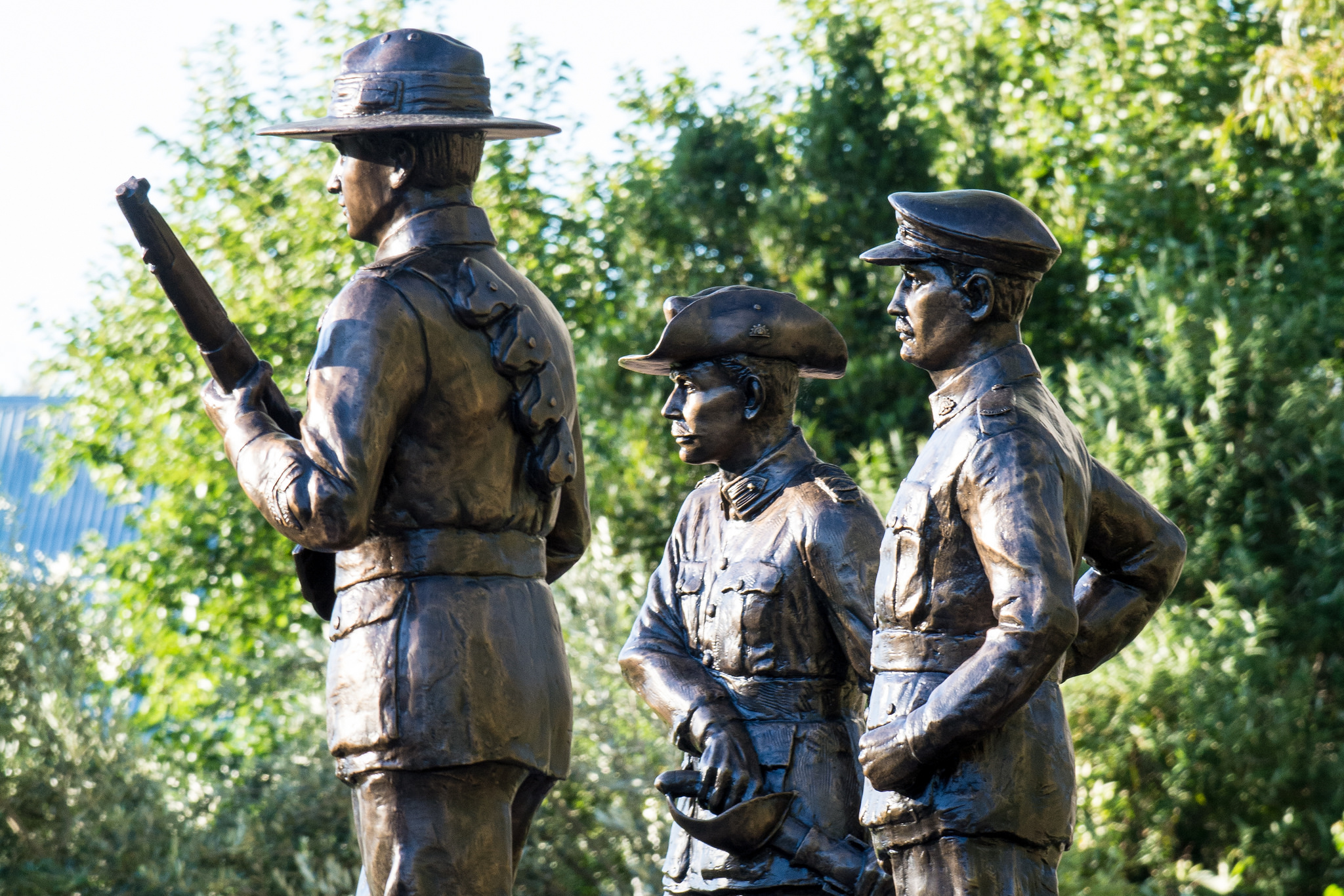
VC Memorial Park Euroa

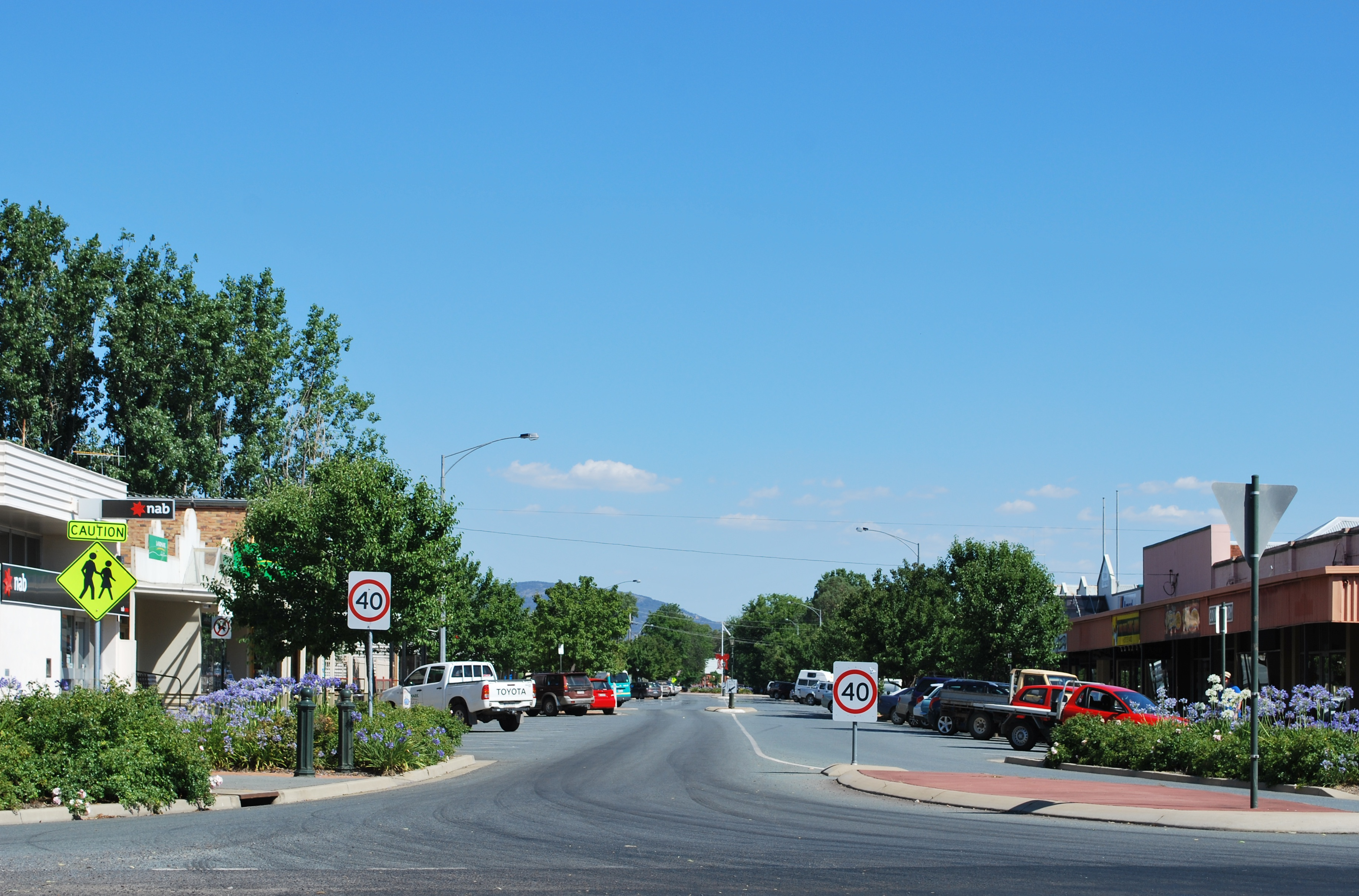
Binney Street
