= Strathbogie =

Strathbogie may refer to:

- Strathbogie, Scotland, the former name of Huntly, Scotland, and the strath to the south of it
  - Strathbogie Castle, former name of Huntly Castle, the ancestral home of the chief of Clan Gordon, Earl of Huntly
  - Strathbogie Park, the former name of Christie Park, Huntly, home ground of association football club Huntly F.C.
- Strathbogie, Victoria, Australia
- Shire of Strathbogie, Victoria, Australia
- Strathbogie Ranges, Victoria, Australia
