= Kennaquhair =

Kennaquhair may refer to

- Kennaquhair, a fictional location in The Monastery and The Abbot
- Kennaquhair, a fictional location in The Sword in the Stone
- Kennaquhair, a thoroughbred racehorse
