= Tales from Benedictine Sources =

Tales from Benedictine Sources (1820) is a pair of novels by Walter Scott consisting of The Abbot and The Monastery.

The novels have only slight connections with one another, for example, both feature the Avenel family, and have monastic themes and titles.

== Sources ==
- Oxford Companion to English Literature
