= Avenel, Victoria =

Avenel
- Town
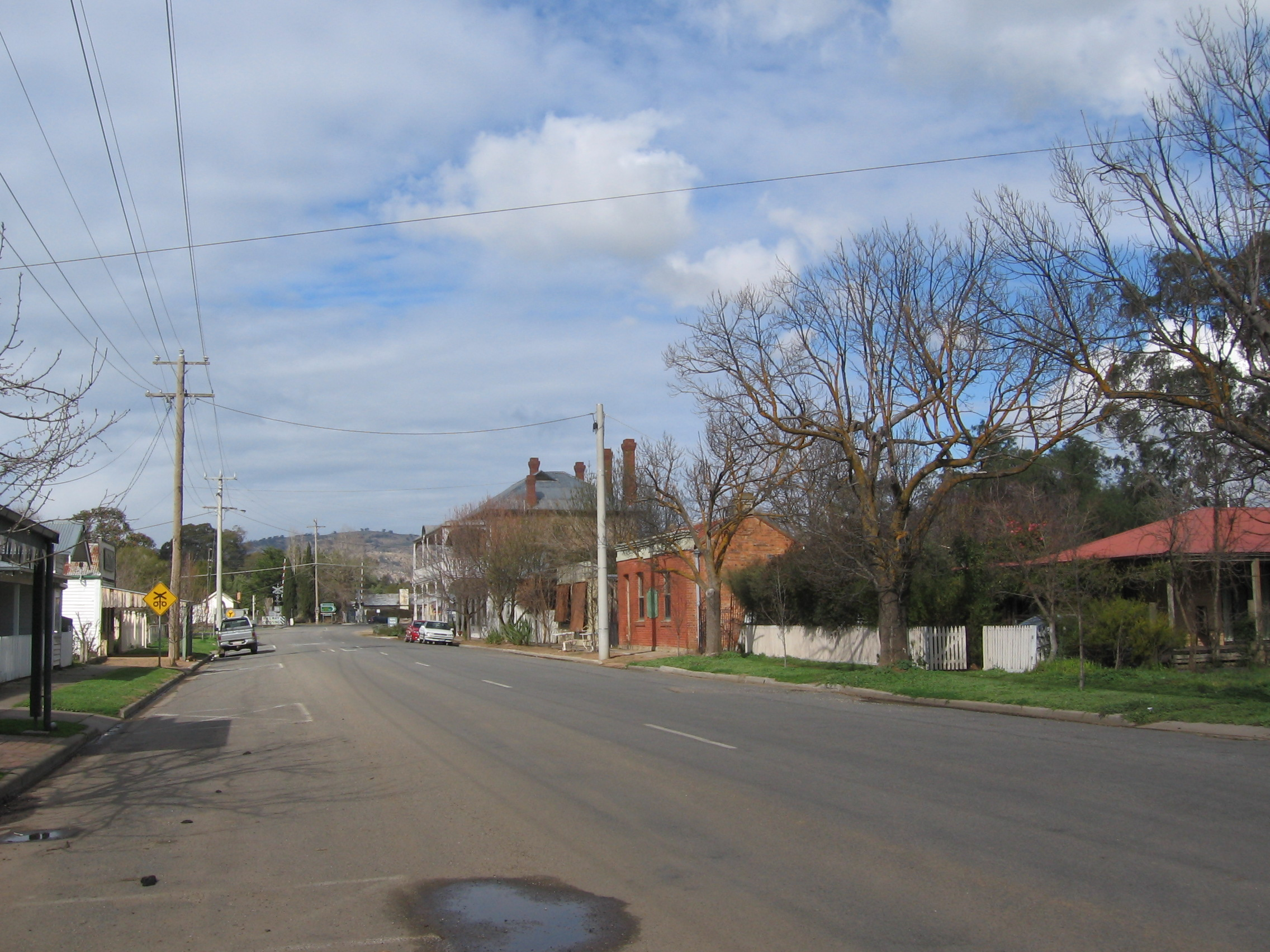
- Main street

- Interactive map of Avenel
- Coordinates: 36°54′S 145°14′E
- Country: Australia
- State: Victoria
- Region: Hume
- LGAs: Shire of Strathbogie; Shire of Mitchell
- Location: 129 km (80 mi) N of Melbourne; 21 km (13 mi) N of Seymour; 17 km (11 mi) SW of Nagambie

Government
  - State electorate: Euroa
  - Federal division: Nicholls

Population
  - Total: 1,112 (2021 census)
- Postcode: 3664
Localities around Avenel
Nagambie	Ruffy	Ruffy
Seymour	Avenel	Ruffy
Seymour	Whiteheads Creek	Killingworth

Avenel is a town in the Shire of Strathbogie, Victoria, Australia. At the 2021 census, Avenel had a population of 1,112, up from 1048 at the 2016 census, 728 at the 2006 census and 552 at the 2001 census.

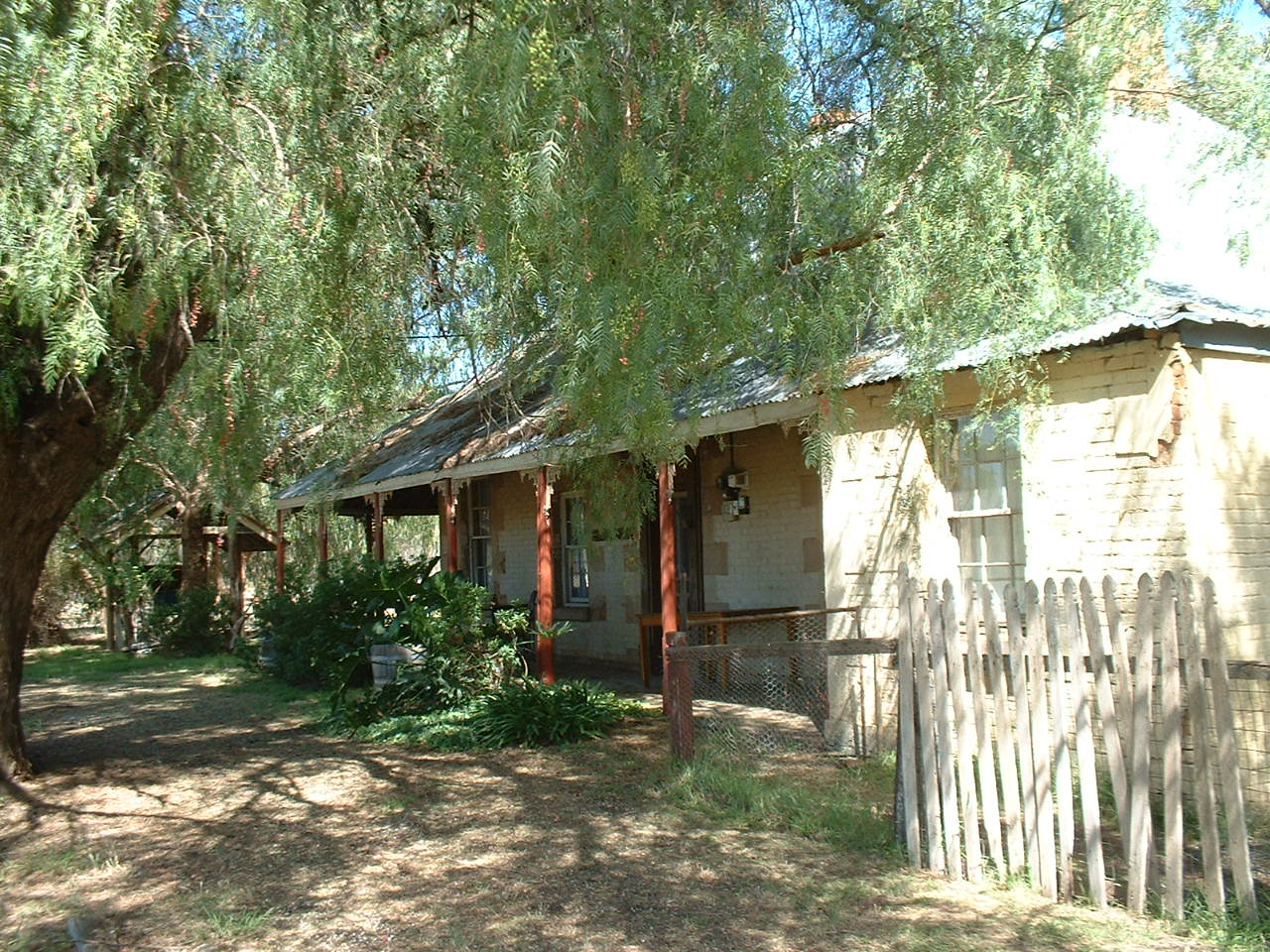
Royal Mail Hotel, built in 1847

== History ==
The Post Office opened on 2 June 1858. It is frequently stated as having been named for a village in Gloucestershire by Henry Kent Hughes. The name "Avenel" also appears in Sir Walter Scott's Tales from Benedictine Sources: The Monastery (1820) and The Abbot (1820) as the name of a castle and family, that own it. Hughes settled there in 1838, laid out the future town, and named the Hughes Creek, which flows through it.

The Avenel Court of Petty Sessions closed on 25 March 1969, with the former courthouse subsequently being used by local community groups.

Avenel was the hometown of Ned Kelly in his younger years, where he saved a boy from drowning in the local Hughes Creek. His brother and father are buried in the Avenel cemetery. Kelly and his family went to school in Avenel.

The Hume Highway passed through the town until a bypass was opened in December 1981.

== Today ==
The town is home to many organisations, including sporting clubs such as the Avenel Football Club competing in the Kyabram District Football League, Avenel Netball Club, Avenel Tennis Club, Avenel Cricket Club and the Avenel Bowling Club.

Golfers play at the Avenel Golf Club on Bank Street. The legendary Keith Corby (a.k.a. De Silva) was honoured with Life Membership for several decades of local dominance, and his dedication to giving a helping hand with the ladies competitions.

The railway station is served by V/Line trains between Melbourne and Albury.

The Goulburn Valley Horse Trials Association has been running the Avenel Horse Trials since 1967, making them one of the longest continually running horse trials in Australia. While the event is no longer run out of Avenel, it retains the name and traditions established over many years operating within the Avenel region. Many current and future Olympic contestants have tested themselves over the Avenel courses.
