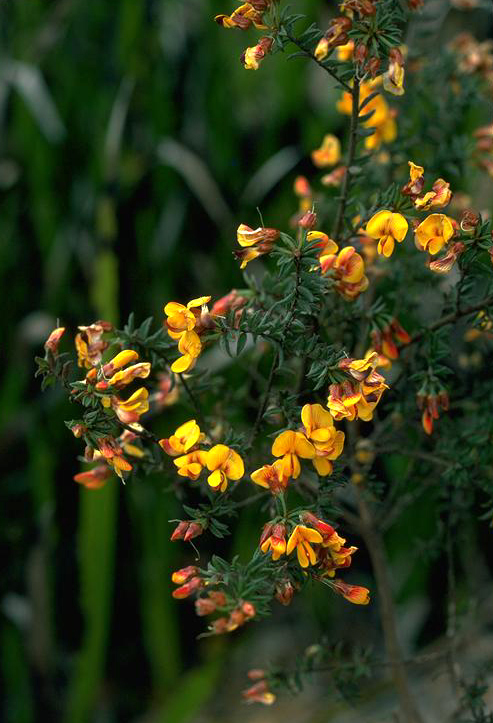
- Pultenaea vrolandii

Scientific classification
- Kingdom: Plantae
- Clade: Tracheophytes
- Clade: Angiosperms
- Clade: Eudicots
- Clade: Rosids
- Order: Fabales
- Family: Fabaceae
- Subfamily: Faboideae
- Genus: Pultenaea
- Species: P. vrolandii

Binomial name
- Pultenaea vrolandii Maiden

= Pultenaea vrolandii =

Cupped bush-pea

Species of flowering plant

Pultenaea vrolandii, commonly known as cupped bush-pea, is a species of flowering plant in the family Fabaceae and is endemic to south-eastern continental Australia. It is an erect shrub with hairy, arching branchlets, elliptic to egg-shaped leaves, and yellow to orange and red to brown flowers.

== Description ==
Pultenaea vrolandii is an erect shrub that typically grows to a height of 0.5–2 m (1 ft 8 in – 6 ft 7 in) and has hairy, arching branchlets. The leaves are arranged alternately, elliptic or egg-shaped, 3–6 mm (0.12–0.24 in) long and 1–3 mm (0.039–0.118 in) wide with the edges curved inwards and dark brown stipules 1–2 mm (0.039–0.079 in) long at the base. The flowers are arranged near the ends of branches, each flower on a pedicel 5–6 mm (0.20–0.24 in) long with slightly enlarged stipules at the base and round, sticky bracteoles about 3–4.5 mm (0.12–0.18 in) long attached to the base of the sepal tube. The sepals are 5–6 mm (0.20–0.24 in) long, the standard is yellow to orange with red striations and 9.5–10 mm (0.37–0.39 in) long, the wings yellow and red to brown or purplish and 8.5–10 mm (0.33–0.39 in) long and the keel reddish purple and 6.8–9 mm (0.27–0.35 in) long. Flowering occurs from October to December and the fruit is a hairy pod about 5 mm (0.20 in) long.

== Taxonomy and naming ==
Pultenaea vrolandii was first formally described in 1905 by Joseph Maiden in The Victorian Naturalist from specimens collected "on the summit of a granite hill ... in the Strathbogie Ranges, Victoria" by Mr. Anton Vroland of Strathbogie State School. The specific epithet (vrolandii) honours the collector of the type specimens.

== Distribution and habitat ==
Cupped push-pea grows in woodland and forest south from near Braidwood and Holbrook in New South Wales to scattered areas of eastern Victoria, including the Strathbogie Ranges and near Licola.
