= Tabilk =

- Town
- Coordinates: 36°50′52.9″S 145°09′43.9″E
- Country: Australia
- State: Victoria
- Region: Hume
- LGA: Shire of Strathbogie

Population
  - Total: 131 (2016)
- Postcode: 3607
Localities around Tabilk
Nagambie	Murchison	Pranjip
Longwood	Tabilk	Mitchellstown
Mangalore	Avenel	Locksley

Tabilk is a locality located in the Shire of Strathbogie. The 2016 census recorded that 131 people lived in the area. The closest major towns are Nagambie (About 10–15 minutes north-west of Tabilk), Avenel (About 20 minutes south-east of Tabilk) and Seymour (About 25–30 minutes south-west of Tabilk.

Passing through Tablik is the Shepparton line. There was a small railway station in Tabilk but has since closed. Places of interest in close proximity to Tabilk include the Goulburn River, Lake Nagambie, and local wineries which include Mitchelton. and Tahbilk.

Tahbilk is a winery located in Tablik, the winery's first vines were planted in 1860 and the winery still operates today. The winery is also known for its five-storey wooden tower overlooking the Goulburn River and the vineyard.

The towns of Nagambie and Avenel also combined to make a junior football/netball club known as the Tabilk Junior Football Netball Club (Tabilk Blues). The reason for this is because the two towns weren't able to make individual clubs so they combined. Tabilk is commonly seen as the area between the towns hence the name

Also passing through Tabilk is the Goulburn Valley Highway.

== Gallery ==
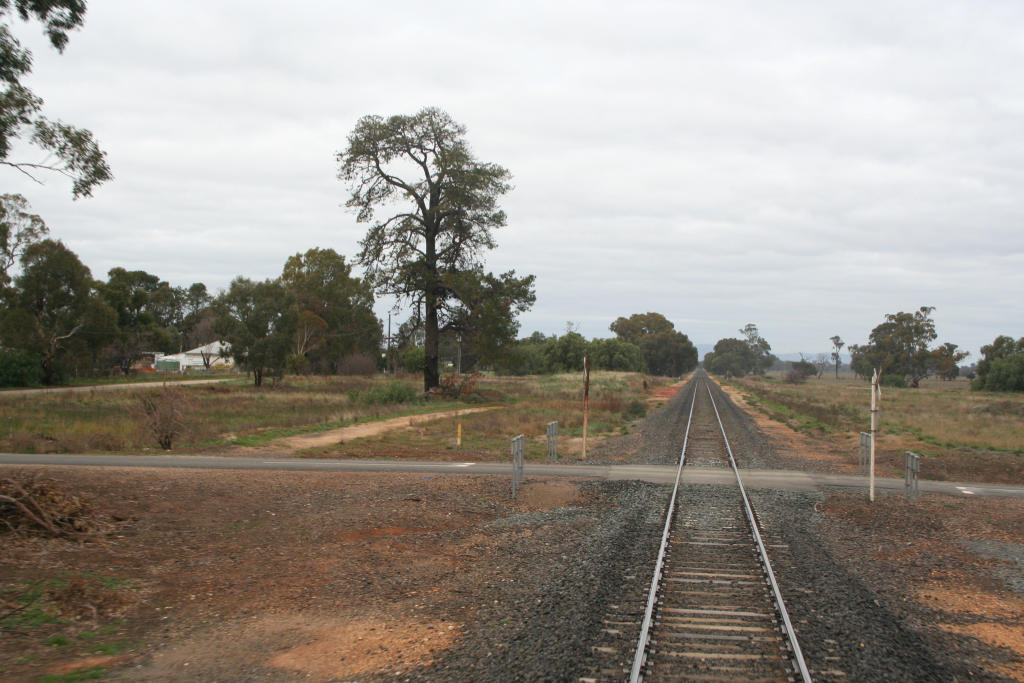
File:Tabilk_station_site.jpgShepparton line passing through Tabilk. This is the site of the former railway station.
