= Millicent Eastwood =

Australian self-employed landlady and a businessperson (1872-1947)

- Born: Millicent Hill; January 18, 1872; Wahring
- Died: March 6, 1947 (aged 75); Melbourne
- Occupations: landlord and businessperson
- Employer: self-employed
- Spouse: Francis Eastwood
- Children: three daughters

Millicent Eastwood, born Millicent Hill, (January 18, 1872 – March 6, 1947) was an Australian self-employed landlady and a businessperson. The apartment building that she owned was placed on the Melbourne's Heritage Places Inventory after it was bought back by her daughters.

== Life ==
Eastwood was born in Wahring, Victoria, in 1872. She was the first of nine children born to Mary (née Gallagher) and her husband Hardy Hill. She had a governess and went to the state school until she was fourteen. Her mother's last child was born about three years later in 1889. She helped her mother. Her own ambitions were fuelled by the book My Brilliant Career by Miles Franklin published in 1901. Franklin's very popular story of the independent heroine, Sybylla, created such strong objections from her family that the author refused to allow it to reprinted for decades. Eastwood, however, was inspired and she left for Melbourne. Her first work was as a dressmaker.

Between 1907 and 1913, she was married and living with her husband Francis Eastwood. He was a 43 year old hatter when they married. In 1913, Francis left Millicent and their three daughters, Isabel, Evelyn and Amy. He was said to have gone to Western Australia but he never made contact again. She became a landlord by renting apartment houses where she would live and then pay the rent to the landlord by sub letting the other rooms in the property. She made a living at this but the profit was dependent on her landlord not raising her rent and it was her job to keep the place clean. The first building she rented was in South Melbourne but she then started moving to six different buildings in Carlton over the next thirteen years. In 1924, she gave up the landlord business and rented two shops that sold sandwiches. For two years she worked long hours five and a half days a week.

Her mother, Mary Hill, came to her rescue when she gave her £300 and this was enough to buy her own apartment building and to be an owner and a landlady for the first time. She bought Cavazzi which had ten rooms and two floors. The building was then numbered "65" and it had been built in 1889 using bricks on Queensberry Street in Carlton. She and her daughters had a four-room maisonette to themselves and they all attended the Catholic mass each Sunday.

Eastwood died in Melbourne in 1947 and in 1959 two of her daughters bought back Cavazzi which is now numbered 19. Their former family home was now surrounded by new higher buildings. The building is recognised as a valued part of Melbourne's heritage.
