= Shire of Strathbogie =

Coordinates: 36°45′00″S 145°34′00″E

- Local government area
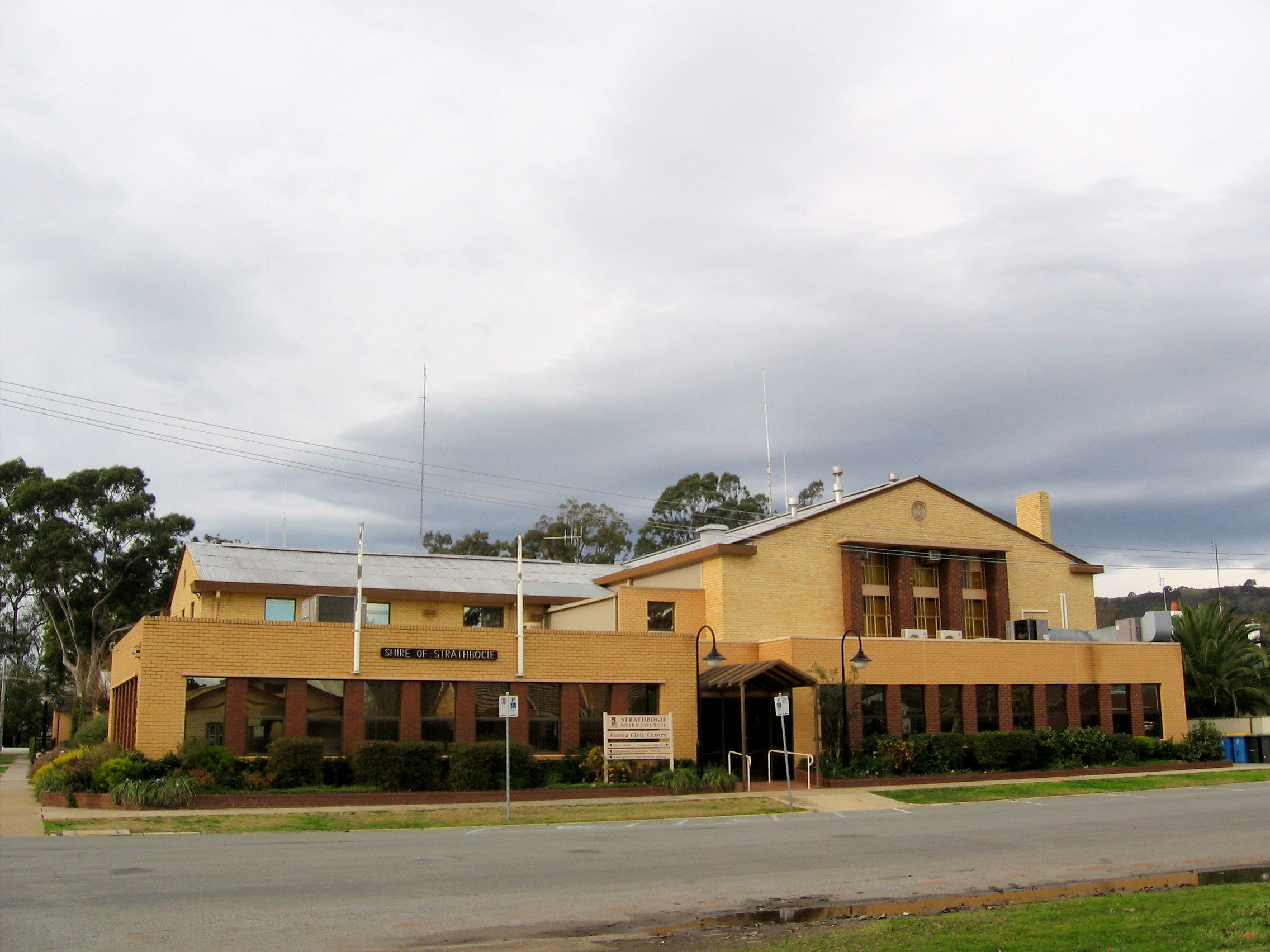
- Council Offices in Euroa

- Interactive map of Shire of Strathbogie
- Country: Australia
- State: Victoria
- Region: Hume
- Established: 1994
- Council seat: Euroa

Government
  - Mayor: Claire Ewart-Kennedy
  - State electorate: Euroa
  - Federal divisions: Indi; Nicholls

Area
  - Total: 3,303 km^{2} (1,275 sq mi)

Population
  - Total: 11,455 (2021 census)
  - Density: 3.4681/km^{2} (8.9822/sq mi)
- Gazetted: 18 November 1994
- Website: Shire of Strathbogie
LGAs around Shire of Strathbogie
Campaspe	Greater Shepparton	Benalla
Greater Bendigo	Shire of Strathbogie	Benalla
Mitchell	Mitchell	Murrindindi

The Shire of Strathbogie is a local government area in the Hume region of Victoria, Australia, located in the north-east part of the state. It covers an area of 3,303 square kilometres (1,275 mi^{2}) and in August 2021 had a population of 11,455. It includes the towns of Avenel, Euroa, Longwood, Nagambie, Strathbogie and Violet Town.

The Shire is about 150 kilometres (90 mi) from Melbourne and bordered to the east by the Strathbogie Ranges and to the west by the Nagambie Lakes district. It is also known for its sheep production, horse studs (earning the title "The Horse Capital of Victoria"), wineries (Mitchelton, Tahbilk, Fowles Wines), olives and alpacas. Tourism is a growing industry in the area, with many B&Bs, hotels and restaurants.

The Shire is governed and administered by the Strathbogie Shire Council; its seat of local government and administrative centre is located at the council headquarters in Euroa, it also has service centres located in Nagambie and Violet Town. The Shire is named after the major geographical feature in the region, the Strathbogie Ranges, which is located in the south-east of the LGA.

== History ==
The Shire of Strathbogie was formed in 1994 from the amalgamation of the vast bulk of the Shire of Euroa and Shire of Goulburn, most of the Shire of Violet Town, and parts of the Shire of McIvor and Rural City of Seymour.

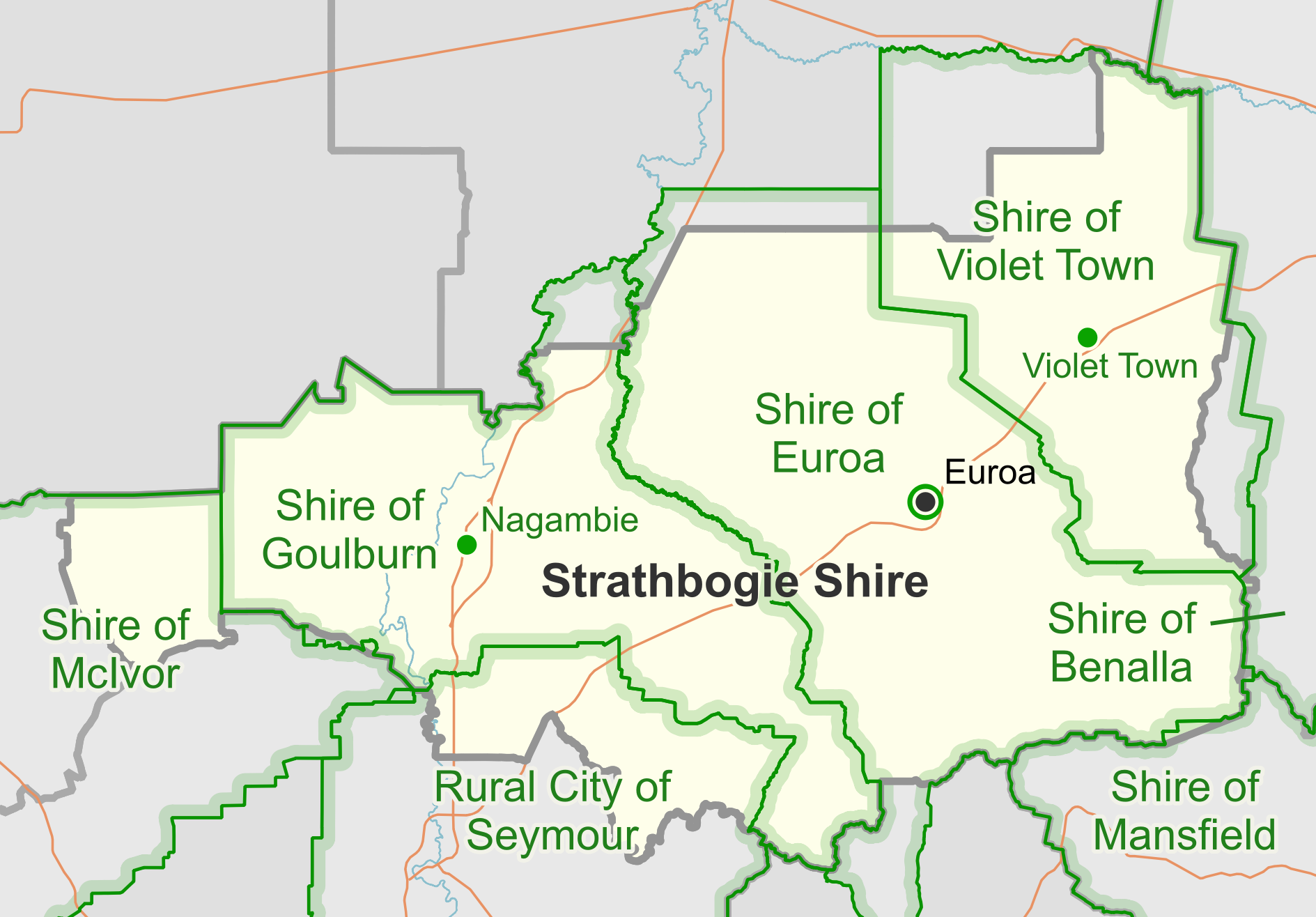
Strathbogie Shire's predecessor LGAs (green) as they were in 1994. The administrative centres of the former LGAs are marked by green dots.

== Council ==
=== Current composition ===
The council is composed of seven councillors. It is an unsubdivided council with no wards. Prior to 2024, the council had seven councillors with two councillors per ward elected to represent each of the Seven Creeks and Lake Nagambie wards, and one councillor per remaining ward elected to represent each of the other wards.

Ward	Councillor	Notes
Unsubdivided	Scott Jeffery	Deputy Mayor
Unsubdivided	Fiona Stevens	
Unsubdivided	Claire Ewart-Kennedy	Mayor
Unsubdivided	Vicki Halsall	
Unsubdivided	Laura Binks	
Unsubdivided	Gregory Carlson	
Unsubdivided	Clark Holloway	

=== Administration and governance ===
The council meets in the council chambers at the council headquarters in the Euroa Municipal Offices, which is also the location of the council's administrative activities. It also provides customer services at both its administrative centre in Euroa, and its service centres in Nagambie and Violet Town.

== Townships and localities ==
In the 2021 census, the shire had a population of 11,455, up from 10,274 in the 2016 census.

Population
Locality	2016	2021
Arcadia South	75	95
Avenel^	1,048	1,112
Baddaginnie^	338	347
Bailieston	109	120
Balmattum	110	135
Boho	68	88
Boho South^	77	93
Creek Junction^	16	34
Creightons Creek	138	162
Earlston	79	82
Euroa	3,275	3,508
Gooram^	148	141
Goulburn Weir^	82	90
Graytown	58	60
Kelvin View	64	76
Kirwans Bridge	136	134
Kithbrook	47	67
Koonda	15	26
Locksley	110	131
Longwood	240	263
Longwood East	95	131
Mangalore^	182	183
Marraweeney	52	77
Miepoll	211	223
Mitchellstown	57	71
Moglonemby	27	28
Molka	38	34
Moorilim^	25	25
Moormbool West	32	43
Nagambie	1,886	2,254
Nalinga^	25	22
Pranjip	18	28
Riggs Creek	30	31
Ruffy^	112	164
Sheans Creek	33	38
Strathbogie	304	351
Tabilk	131	160
Tamleugh	51	54
Tarcombe^	42	32
Upotipotpon	57	56
Upton Hill	23	29
Violet Town^	874	936
Wahring	85	88
Whroo^	42	45
Wirrate	3	3

^ - Territory divided with another LGA

== See also ==
- List of localities in Victoria
- List of places on the Victorian Heritage Register in the Shire of Strathbogie
