= Euroa Post Office =

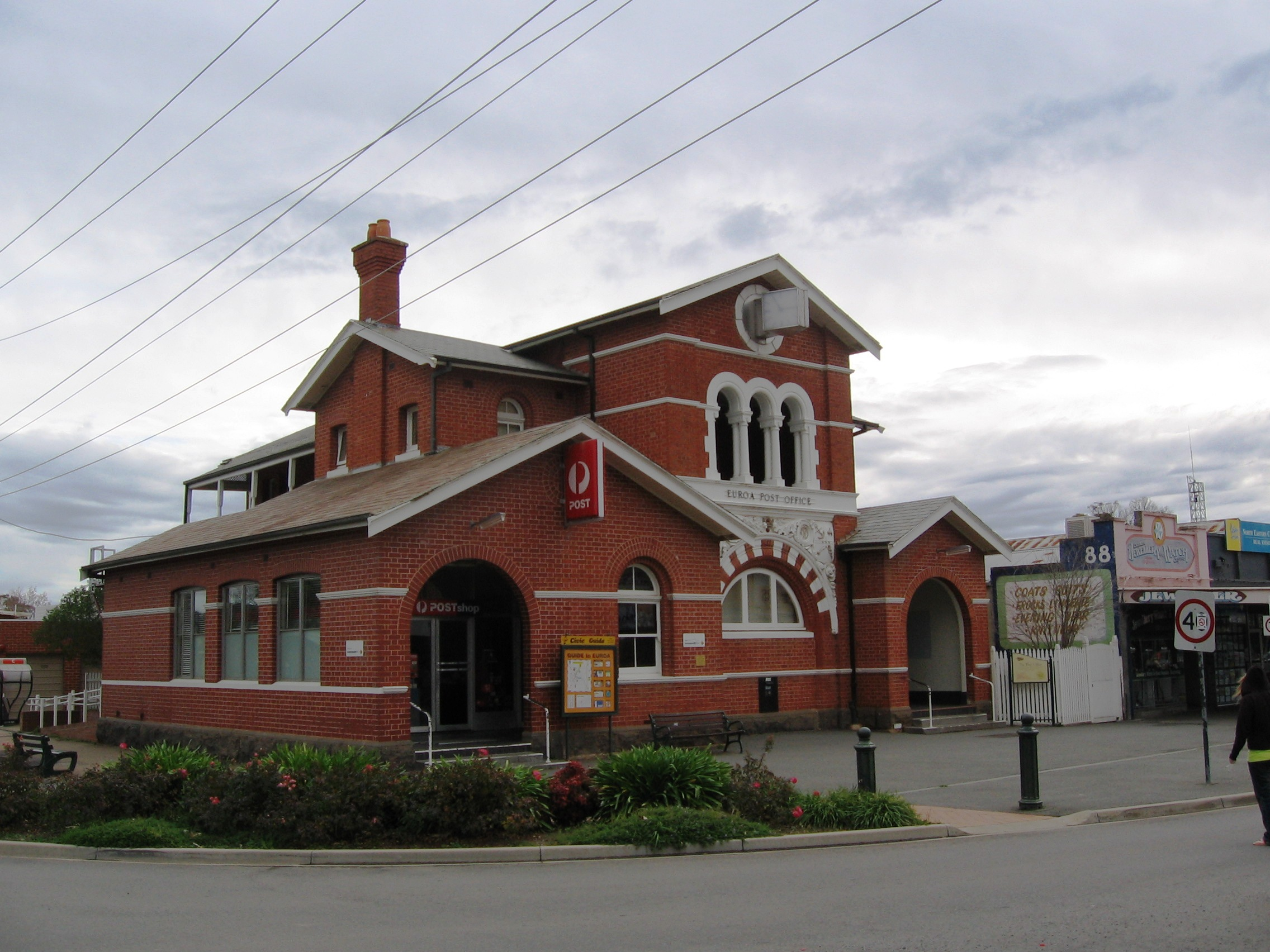

- Location within Victoria
- 36.7512°S 145.5705°E
- Location: 90 Binney Street, Euroa, Victoria, Australia

History
- Built: 1890

Site notes
- Architect(s): John Thomas Kelleher, possibly with the assistance of A. J. McDonald

Commonwealth Heritage List
- Official name: Euroa Post Office
- Type: Listed place (Historic)
- Designated: 22 August 2012
- Reference no.: 106201

Euroa Post Office is a heritage-listed post office at 90 Binney Street, Euroa, Victoria, Australia. It was designed by John Thomas Kelleher of the state Public Works Department, possibly with the assistance of A. J. McDonald, and built in 1890 by George Diggle. It was added to the Australian Commonwealth Heritage List on 22 August 2012.

== History ==
The first Euroa Post Office was opened by John De Boos on 1 January 1854 and a telegraph office was provided at the railway station in 1876, followed by a PO savings bank in 1878. The town's first permanent post office building, a new single-storey building constructed of polychrome brick, was constructed on the same site in 1883–84 by J. H. Brewer, however this burnt down on 23 February 1889.

The current building, constructed of red face brick, was erected by builder George Diggle in 1890 for £1,300. It incorporated remnant brick walling from the original building into the rear ground floor areas. The original sub-treasury area at the northwest corner of the building was converted to a telephone exchange prior to 1960.

Between 1962 and 1968, the building underwent major alteration to front of the building, plus substantial internal changes to the postal areas and former residence. The latter included subdivision of the kitchen pantry, provision of a side entrance to the residential stair, conversion of first floor sitting room to a kitchen and bathroom, and a double-storey toilet block constructed at the southern end of the north–south passage. This addition also included an external laundry block at the southwest corner of the building. By this time, the original timber picket fence along both frontages had been removed and replaced with a standard picket fence in front of the western side garden and eastern rear yard. A new clock was installed in 1968. Presumably the alterations were recognition of Euroa's increase in size – its population had more than doubled to around 4500 in around 50 years, as the town serviced an increasing Hume Highway traffic and assumed a role as district capital.

In c. 1986–88, a single-storey rear addition was constructed at the south-east corner of the building to provide loading dock facilities to Brock Street and an opening was created in the original rear wall to interconnect this space to the contractor's area (original ground floor bedrooms). A brick scooter shed was constructed at the adjacent corner of the property. In the 1990s and then in 2002, ramped access was constructed to the rear of the 1960s post office addition and public space interior refurbished to Australia Post standards. This included reducing the long counter to a small angled service counter in the northwest corner of the shop and enlargement of the retail area. The post box lobby and main entrance were also retiled.

== Description ==
Euroa Post Office is at 90 Binney Street, Euroa, comprising the whole of Lot 1 on Plan of Subdivision No. 147805A.

Euroa Post Office of 1890 is located at the south-west corner of Binney and Brock streets, at the eastern end of Euroa's principal retail strip. The post office building forms a streetscape pairing with the nearby 1892 Court House at 99 Binney Street, and contributes to the predominantly Victorian and Edwardian surrounds. The building is now built to the Brock Street frontage, but originally had a narrow garden setting on the east and west sides. Vehicular access to the site is provided at the south-east corner with a recent concrete driveway providing access to 1980s rear loading dock and scooter shed. An earlier timber-framed and corrugated steel shed survives in the rear garden.

The 1890 post office building was a double-storey symmetrical design facing north-east, parallel with the Binney Street frontage and comprised a breakfront containing recessed ground floor porch and first floor "piazza", and two single-storey flanking pavilions projecting beyond the breakfront. This Tshaped plan, with verandahed quarters to the rear, followed the original single-storey post office of 1883–4, retaining some or most of the surviving fabric in the ground floor walling. This fabric is indicated by polychrome brickwork as opposed to plain red of the later building and is clearly visible in the rear side elevations at ground floor level.

The slate-finished roofscape is punctuated by tall red face brick chimneys and the eaves are lined with beaded timber lining boards. The 1890s load-bearing walls are finished in exposed tuckpointed face red brick, lined with five cement string-courses over the two storeys, and a rock-faced bluestone plinth with tooled margins. As noted above, the remnant 1883 polychrome brickwork is evident in the rear sections at ground floor level. Two single-storey pavilions project forward under simple gables, complementing the main breakfront gable above, however the eastern bay has been widened to double its original width, although it contains the original arched window. The western bay, however, has a non-original arched doorway and steps. These three gables have non-original timber bargeboards, replacing the original moulded design.

Below the main breakfront gable is a roundel, now containing a non-original clock, and below that three linked arches with stuccoed pilasters, architraves and flanking quoins rest on a panelled floor course now labelled with non-original lettering. Below that is a sculpted spandrel above the, now infilled, main entry arch, with paired crests of the Queen and St George/England to each side, a popular motif in the contemporary American free Romanesque. The crests were linked by a field of relief sculpture proclaiming the construction date.

The original main entry arch is in brick with rendered voussoirs and a moulded arch line, with a moulded brick archivolt and reveal and non-original timber-framed lunette with leaded glazing. Original fenestration throughout the building has round arches in face brick with timber-framed double-hung sash windows in and lunettes divided into quadrants in the arches themselves. This arrangement was echoed in the upper storey quarters windows, though the lunettes on these were single-paned.

Initially the lower string course was tiled in to fit the upper fence line, while the lower fence line, with double the newels, lined up with the plinth top. The eastern elevation is screened by a double-height timber-framed and floored verandah with timber balustrades and friezes, and a roofline integral with the main quarters roof.

Externally, Euroa Post Office was substantially altered in the 1960s, although at the time, the alterations were believed to be in keeping with the original architectural concept. The works included a major alteration to the front of building to incorporate a larger post office area at the north-east corner, and a larger mailroom and private post office box area in the original sub-treasury area. The work involved widening of the eastern single-storey breakfront wing towards the side street, effectively doubling the original bay width. The original arched counter in the southern wall was removed and a long new counter was installed, reoriented to the eastern wall. A new single-storey office was constructed directly behind this wing, concealing the original entrance from the side verandah, and the adjacent original window was altered to provide a new doorway from the verandah. The original main arched entrance to the ground floor porch was also infilled and the porch area incorporated into an enlarged mailroom. The mailroom was also extended in a southerly direction, absorbing two original ground floor bedrooms. In addition, the original clock in the front gable was replaced with the present projecting illuminated clock, the original "POST & TELEGRAPH OFFICE" inscription was removed from the label course and replaced by a simpler steel sign "EUROA POST OFFICE" in Roman lettering, and additional illuminated signage was installed. The decorated bargeboards were also removed and replaced with plain barges.

Internally, the original program and planning of the ground floor was also substantially and significantly obscured by the 1960s works, although the bulk of original joinery remains intact. While it was not inspected, the integrity of the first floor form and fabric is apparently relatively high.

Key areas/elements include:

- The original building presentation to both streets and garden, including overall massing and form, unpainted brickwork, decorative cement appliqué, verandah, recessed "piazza", projecting gables, and roof form;
- presentation of the quarters;
- plan form of residence and verandah and piazza (main stair, configuration of rooms and fireplace placements).

Externally and internally the Euroa Post Office appears to be in relatively sound condition, well maintained and with no major defects visible.

Original fabric includes:

- Structural frame: Load-bearing brick walling on bluestone base; timber-framed floor on masonry piers and timber-framed roof.
- External walls: Tuckpointed face red brick with cement dressed courses and stucco appliqué; coursed rock-faced bluestone base with tooled margins.
- Internal walls: Hard plastered finish to brick walling; timber-framed partitions with lathe and plaster finish.
- Floor: Timber boards on timber-framed floor and masonry footings throughout with the exception of the original ground floor porch which was tessellated tiled; bluestone thresholds and front steps.
- Ceiling: Strapped plaster with moulded cornice.
- Roof: Gabled with slate finish, beaded timber lining boards and sections of exposed timber rafters; timber barge boards finished with moulded timber roundels; multiple red face chimneys with corbelled caps and terracotta chimney pots.
- Other: Decorative wrought iron gate and turnstile to ground floor porch; clock fitted in main gable; timber-framed verandah with timber fretwork to east elevation; moulded timber joinery throughout interior with architrave roundels, panelled timber doors and timber mantels and surrounds.

== Heritage listing ==
Euroa Post Office was listed on the Australian Commonwealth Heritage List on 22 August 2012 with the following rationale:.

Euroa Post Office of 1890, which originally incorporated a post office, telegraph office, sub-treasury and integrated residence, is of historical and social significance. The post office has been a very prominent and highly visible public and postal building for 120 years in Euroa, and forms an important streetscape pairing with the nearby 1892 Court House. The substantial post office incorporates part of an earlier 1880s postal building, which burnt down; it also underwent major remodelling and additions in the 1960s, at a time when Euroa's population was increasing as the town serviced the growing Hume Highway traffic and assumed a role as the local district "capital". The emphasis given to the post office, in promotional material for the town, also helps demonstrate its social significance in the local context

Euroa Post Office is an example of a:

1. Post office and telegraph office with quarters (second generation typology 1870–1920);
2. Victorian period building in a Romanesque style with American freestyle and Federation Queen Anne influences;
3. Building by Public Works Department architect, JT Kelleher, possibly with the assistance of AJ McDonald.

Typologically, Euroa Post Office is an example of a combined post and telegraph office and sub-treasury with integrated quarters, originally skilfully unified into a composite form, but subsequently substantially altered. The works to the building have impacted on the integrity of the original separate functions and diminished evidence of the original internal relationships, although the residential component is believed to be more intact at first floor level. The bulk of original joinery also remains intact.

Stylistically and architecturally, Euroa Post Office in its original form was a fine example of a design which combined Romanesque style with American freestyle and Federation Queen Anne influences. It was also one of several 1890s post office and courthouse designs where a free Romanesque style was mixed with other treatments. The 1960s alterations and additions altered the building front quite substantially, particularly in relocating the entries, and are confusing at one level as they attempted to retain and work within the original freestyle. On the other hand, the thoroughness with which the free Romanesque was pursued in these alterations was rare in Australia in the early 1960s, coming before Romanesque and nineteenth century Italianate and freestyles were generally well understood in architectural circles. Accepting that the architectural qualities of the building have been diminished by these works, the original symmetry and overall building form and detailing are largely retained, including the main breakfront, first floor "piazza", single-storey flanking pavilions, arched openings and vigorous gabled roof forms. The main breakfront gable in particular retains its roundel, and three linked arches below with stuccoed pilasters, architraves and flanking quoins, and below this again the sculpted spandrel above the infilled main entry arch which in turn retains the paired crests which were a popular motif in the contemporary American free Romanesque. Euroa Post Office is also a competent example of the work of Public Works Department architect, JT Kelleher and possibly AJ McDonald, comparing directly with their work on the nearby Euroa Courthouse (1892).

Aesthetically, Euroa Post Office Euroa is a landmark building on a principal street corner, deriving aesthetic value from its scale and prominence, vigorous gabled roof forms and tall chimneys, and redbrick walls contrasting with the rendered Romanesque detailing. The building also complements the nearby Euroa Court House (1892), by the same architect, and makes an important contribution to the historic character and visual harmony of the town streetscape. The post office is additionally prominent among local historic buildings which are featured in promotional material for the town.

The curtilage includes the title block/allotment of the property.

Significant elements of Euroa Post Office include the two-storey 1890 post office building, and the remnant 1884–84 ground floor fabric from the earlier post office on site. Non-significant elements include the later mostly skillion-roofed brick additions, 1980s rear loading dock, recent brick scooter shed, brick-walled concrete ramp and earlier but still utilitarian timber-framed and corrugated steel shed to rear of site.
