= Kirwans Bridge =

- Town
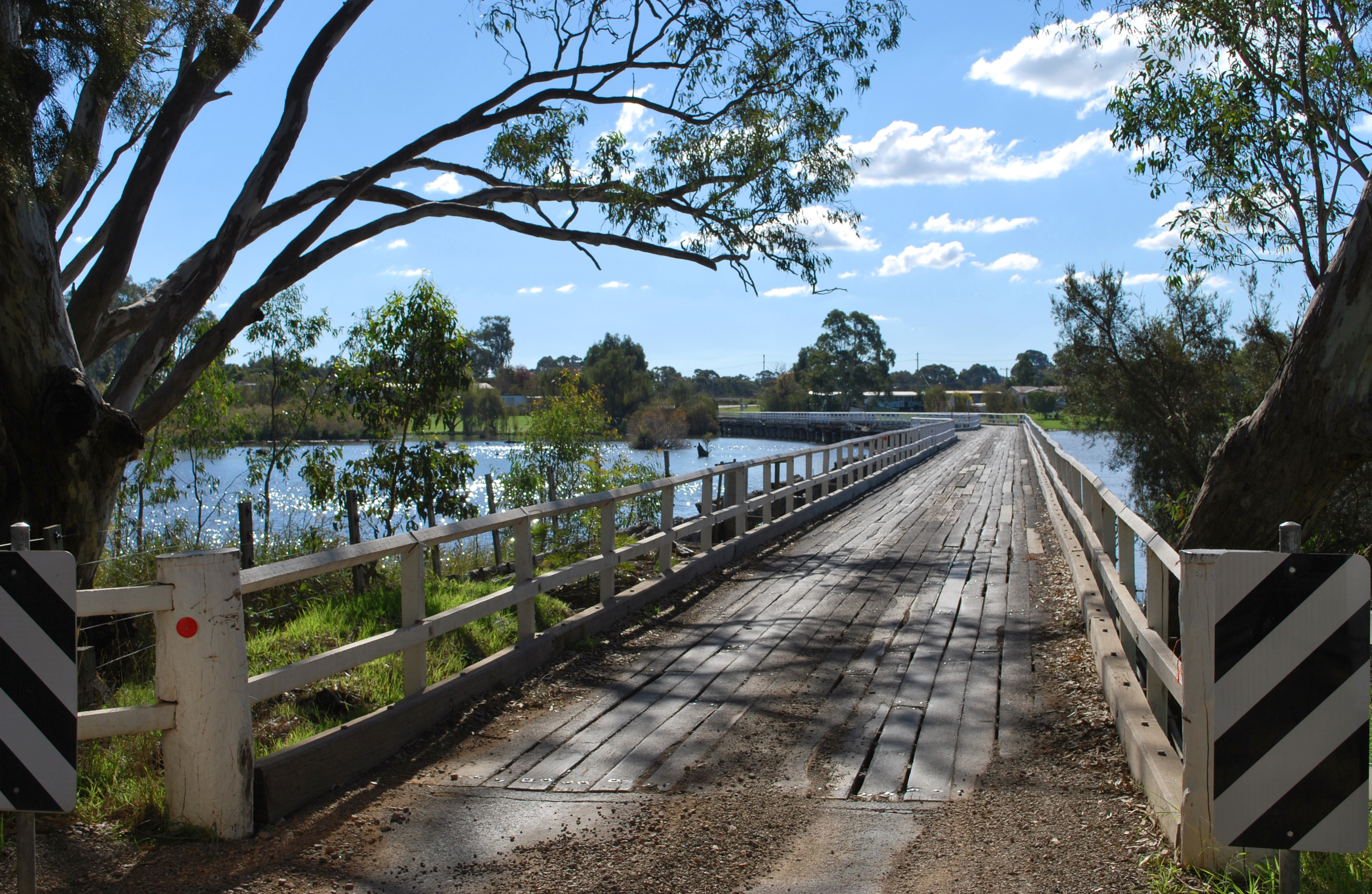
- The eponymous bridge at Kirwans Bridge

- Interactive map of Kirwans Bridge
- Coordinates: 36°44′50″S 145°08′25″E
- Country: Australia
- State: Victoria
- Region: Hume
- LGA: Shire of Strathbogie
- Location: 143 km (89 mi) NE of Melbourne; 52 km (32 mi) S of Shepparton; 5 km (3.1 mi) N of Nagambie

Government
  - State electorate: Euroa
  - Federal division: Nicholls

Population
  - Total: 136 (2016 census)
- Postcode: 3608

Kirwans Bridge is a locality in north east Victoria, Australia. The locality is in the Shire of Strathbogie local government area and on the Goulburn River, 143 kilometres (89 mi) north east of the state capital, Melbourne.

At the 2016 census, Kirwans Bridge had a population of 136.

Kirwans Bridge also refers to the heritage listed bridge which was opened late in 1890. It is a unique bridge, with an unusual bend. At 310m it is the longest timber bridge in Victoria.

On 10 Mar 2018, the bridge height restriction (previously 3 metres (9.8 ft) was arbitrarily removed by visitors crossing to the North.
