= Wahring, Victoria =

Wahring
- Town
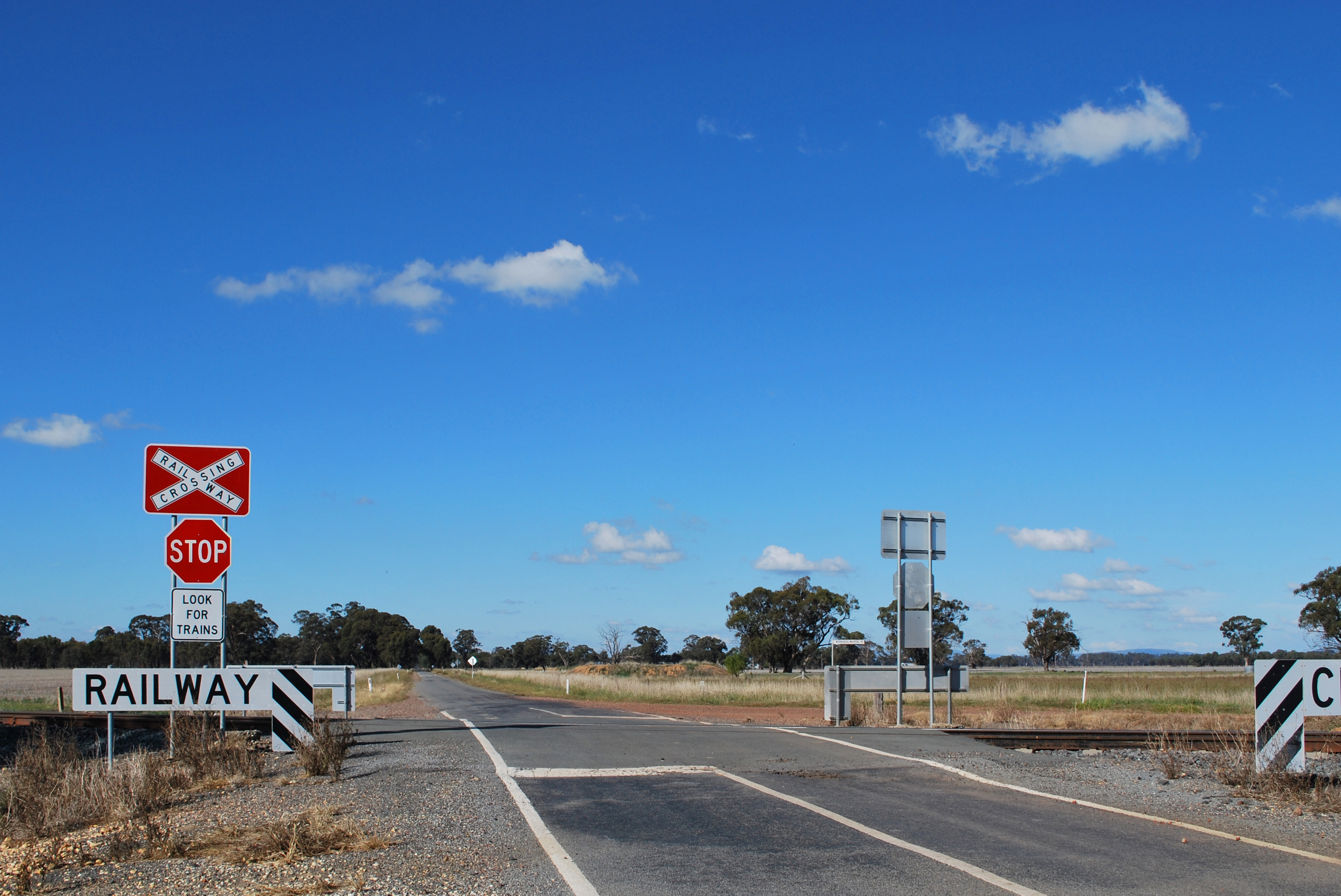
- Level crossing over the Tocumwal railway line at Wahring

- Coordinates: 36°42′29″S 145°13′04″E
- Country: Australia
- State: Victoria
- Region: Hume
- LGA: Shire of Strathbogie
- Location: 149 km (93 mi) N of Melbourne; 44 km (27 mi) S of Shepparton; 11 km (6.8 mi) NE of Nagambie

Government
  - State electorate: Euroa
  - Federal division: Nicholls

Population
  - Total: 85 (2016 census)
- Postcode: 3608

Wahring is a locality in northern Victoria, Australia. The locality is in the Shire of Strathbogie local government area, 149 kilometres (93 mi) north east of the state capital, Melbourne.

Millicent Eastwood was born here in 1872 before she left to become a businessperson and landlord in Melbourne.

At the 2016 census, Wahring had a population of 85.
