= Strathbogie Ranges =

Mountains in Australia

- Strathbogie Tableland
- Location within Victoria

Dimensions
- Length: 50 km (31 mi) N-S
- Width: 10 km (6.2 mi) E-W

Geography
- Country: Australia
- Region: Victoria
- Range coordinates: 36°50′49″S 145°23′13″E
- Parent range: Great Dividing Range

Geology
- Rock age: Devonian
- Rock type: Strathbogie Granodiorite

The Strathbogie Ranges are a set of low mountain ranges within the Great Dividing Range, rising to 1,033 metres (3,389 ft) at Mount Strathbogie. The Strathbogie Ranges are located approximately 150 kilometres (93 mi) north-east of Melbourne, Victoria.

== Geology and ecology ==
The range is the remains of a granite uplifted plateau in the southern part of the ranges and volcanic eruption in the north which formed a 20–30-kilometre (12–19 mi) wide cauldron volcano. The topography consists of a series of ridges and undulating plateaus dissected by streams. The Strathbogie Ranges are north of the main Great Dividing Range, separated by the Goulburn River and Broken River (Victoria) valleys. This separation has produced unique biogeographic and ecological patterns. Some of the more prominent peaks of the range include Mount Strathbogie (1,033 metres (3,389 ft)), Mount Wombat (791 metres (2,595 ft)), Sugarloaf (691 metres (2,267 ft)) and Mount Barranhet (832 metres (2,730 ft)).

== History ==
The Strathbogie Ranges are located in Taungurung country. Although the documented white history of the area generally asserts that the mountain range was not often frequented by Indigenous people, stone artifacts are widely distributed across the Strathbogie Tableland, all of which was once forested. The discovery of these artifacts is evidence of regular, though perhaps seasonal, utilization of the region by Indigenous people.

Squatters running sheep and hundreds of cattle took up large tracts of land in the Ranges from about 1842. The stations included Bailey Hill, Strathbogie, Springs A and Wombat Hill, predominantly in the hill country, while parts of Saintfield and Borodomanin were also in the ranges. John Gall of Wombat Hill was one of the few early settlers to remain in the district. John Kissock of Strathbogie Station arrived in the 1847, while William Forlonge later owned Strathbogie totalling 75,000 hectares (185,000 acres), and many of the other pastoral stations, between the early 1850s and 1867.

In 1891 a butter factory was built at Strathbogie South (as Strathbogie was then known and a second factory was built in 1892 at Strathbogie North. A Post Office opened in Strathbogie on 10 July 1878.

There are several districts located within the Strathbogie Ranges including Strathbogie and Ruffy, but no towns and few major roads; Strathbogie township has a general store and Ruffy township has 'The Pantry'.

== Bushfires ==
Due to the climate of the region, the type of vegetation and the topography, the Strathbogie Ranges likely experienced periodic bushfires prior to European settlement. Several bushfires of restricted extent have burnt parts of the ranges in recent years Strathbogie 1990 and Longwood East-Creighton's Creek 2014 The major Victorian bushfires of 1851, 1939, 1983, 2003, 2006 and 2009 did not reach the Strathbogie Ranges.

== Wine region ==
The Strathbogie wine region developed from the mid 1970s with Dr Peter Tisdall planting a new vineyard at Mt Helen. There are over 25 vineyards located in the region, at altitudes ranging from 150–650 metres (490–2,130 ft), with plantings on acidic sandy loams formed from decomposed granite. The main wine varieties are Chardonnay, Sauvignon Blanc, Pinot Noir and Shiraz.
