= Ruffy, Victoria =

Ruffy
- Town
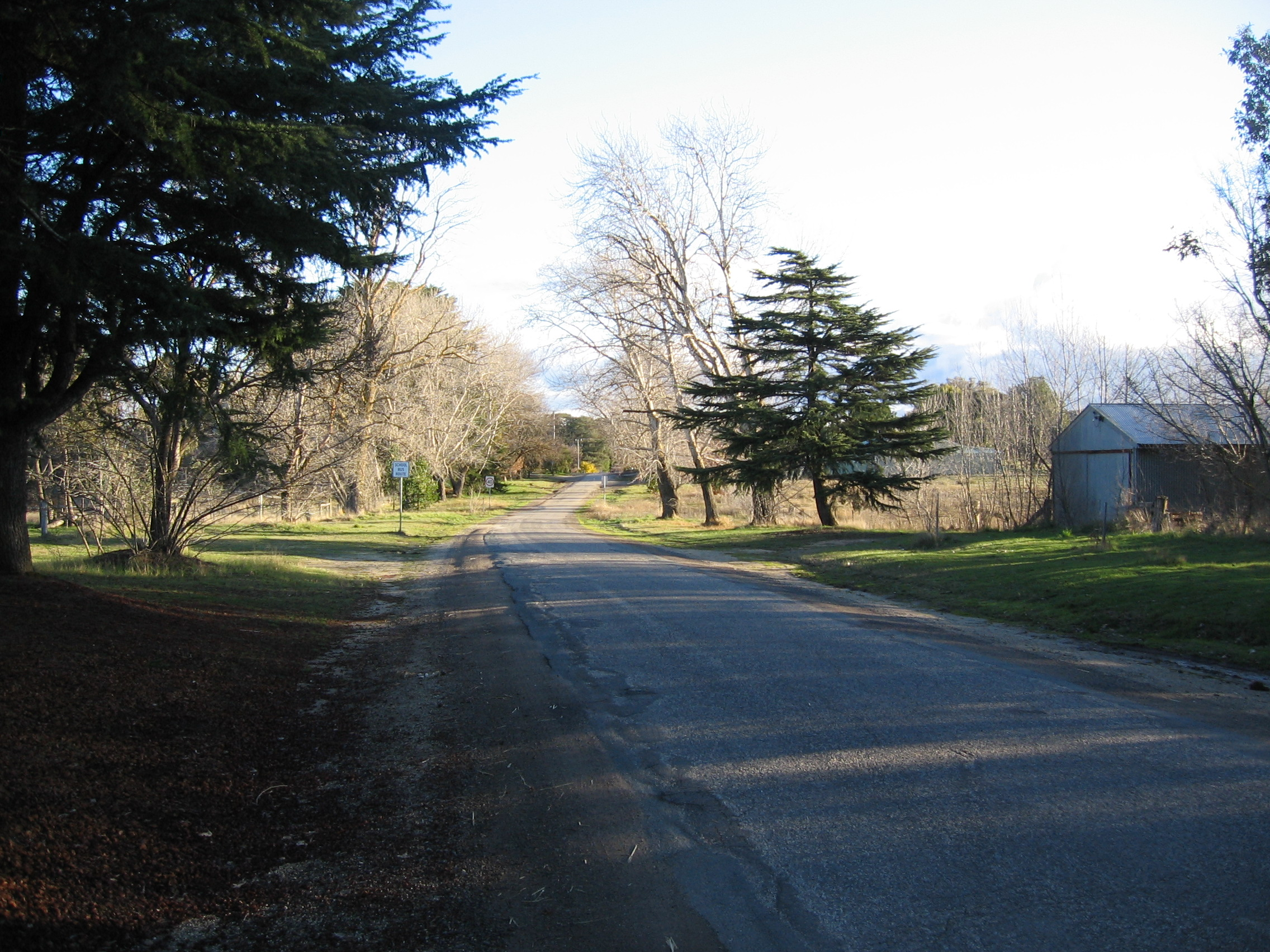
- The main street of Ruffy, looking from the produce store towards the school, 2008

- Coordinates: 36°59′0″S 145°30′0″E
- Country: Australia
- State: Victoria
- Region: Hume
- LGAs: Shire of Strathbogie; Shire of Murrindindi
- Location: 175 km (109 mi) N of Melbourne; 60 km (37 mi) E of Seymour; 45 km (28 mi) N of Yea; 24 km (15 mi) S of Longwood

Government
  - State electorate: Eildon
  - Federal division: Indi

Population
  - Total: 164 (2021 census)
- Postcode: 3666

Ruffy is a locality in Victoria, Australia. It straddles the border of the Shire of Strathbogie and the Shire of Murrindindi, 175 kilometres (109 mi) north of the state capital, Melbourne.

At the 2021 census, Ruffy had a population of 164.

The Post Office opened on 1 April 1881 as Terip Terip, was renamed Ruffy in 1895, and closed in 1974.

Ruffy was the childhood home of Leslie Cecil Maygar, awarded the Victoria Cross in the Second Boer War.

On 8 January 2026, Ruffy was damaged by a bushfire, which destroyed the community centre, the old school building, the telephone exchange, a former grain store, and at least ten other structures.
