= The Abbot =

1820 novel by Walter Scott

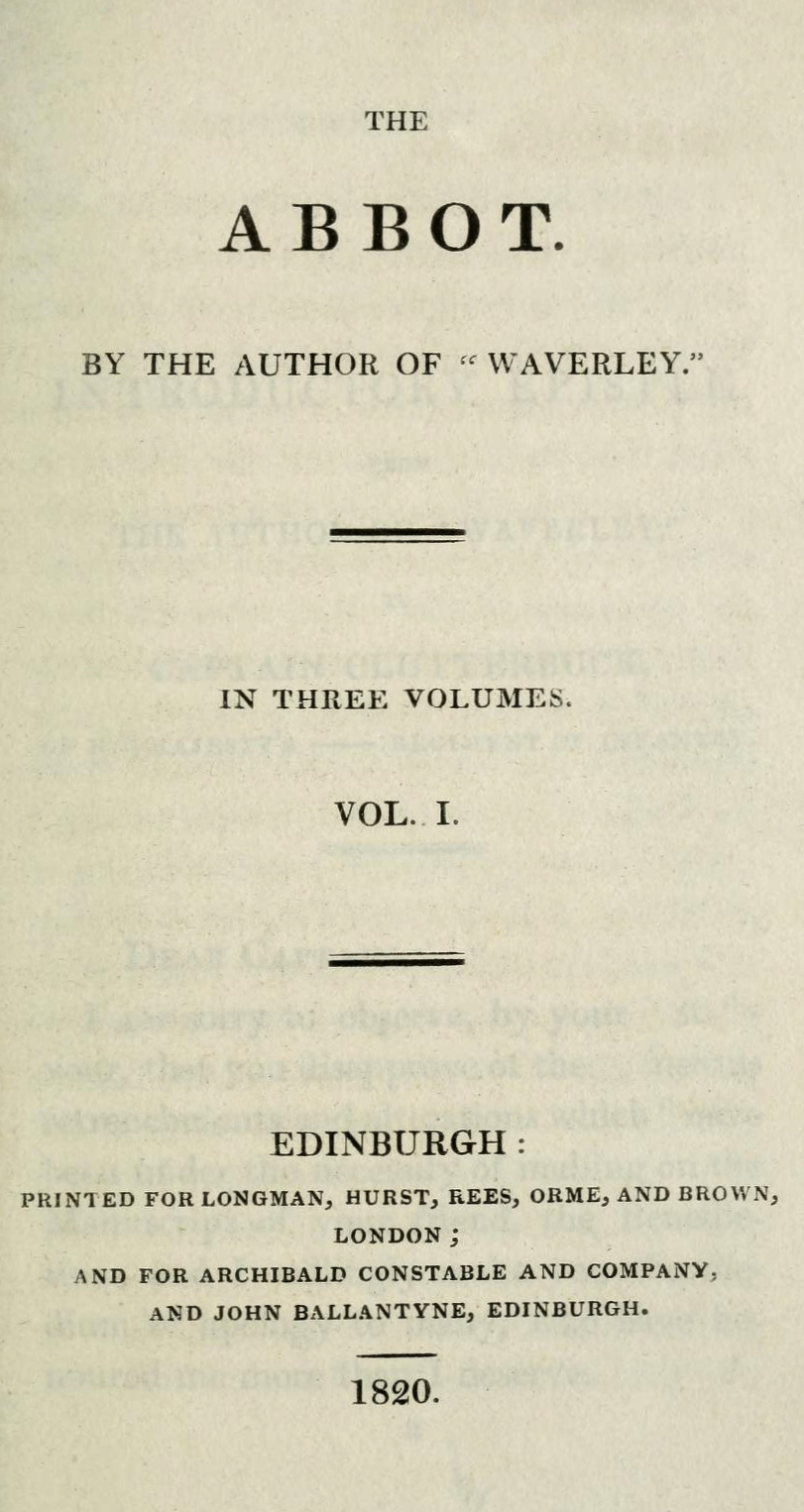
- First edition title page.
- Author: Sir Walter Scott
- Language: English, Lowland Scots
- Series: Waverley Novels
- Genre: Historical novel
- Publisher: Archibald Constable and John Ballantyne (Edinburgh); Longman, Hurst, Rees, Orme, and Brown (London)
- Publication date: 2 September 1820
- Publication place: Scotland
- Media type: Print
- Pages: 375 (Edinburgh Edition, 2000)
- Preceded by: The Monastery
- Followed by: Kenilworth

The Abbot (1820) is a historical novel by Sir Walter Scott, one of the Waverley novels. A sequel to The Monastery, its action takes place in 1567 and 1568. It reaches its climax in the escape of Mary, Queen of Scots from Lochleven Castle leading to her defeat at the Battle of Langside and her final departure from Scotland.

== Composition and sources ==
It seems likely that Scott was considering a novel depicting the imprisonment of Mary Queen of Scots at Lochleven Castle as early as the summer of 1817. It is further likely that in August 1819 he began work on a novel (soon called The Monastery) which was intended to include the Lochleven material. He laid that aside to complete Ivanhoe, and by the time he resumed writing in November he realised he had sufficient material to make two three-volume novels. He completed The Monastery before the end of February 1820. The Abbot was begun in the second half of April and finished (with the possible exception of the Introductory Epistle) probably on 11 August.

Scott had in his library an extensive collection of works relating to Mary, Queen of Scots, the most recent being the Life of Mary, Queen of Scots by George Chalmers which appeared in 1818. It is noteworthy that he refuses to address the question of her role in the death of Darnley, which had long tended to dominate discussions. The characterisation of the other historical figures in the novel is essentially Scott's own, though again he was able to glean details of actions and utterances from his collection.

== Editions ==
The Abbot was published by Archibald Constable and John Ballantyne in Edinburgh on 2 September 1820 and by Longman, Hurst, Rees, Orme, and Brown in London two days later. As with all of the Waverley novels before 1827 publication was anonymous. The print run was 10,000 and the price £1 4s (£1.20). There is no reason to suppose that Scott was involved with the novel again until the beginning of 1830 when he revised the text and added an introduction and notes for the 'Magnum' edition where it appeared as Volumes 20 and 21 in January and February 1831.

The standard modern edition, by Christopher Johnson, was published in 2000 as Volume 10 of the Edinburgh Edition of the Waverley Novels: it is based on the first edition with emendations mainly from the manuscript and a set of editorial changes to rectify the Douglas family relationships; the Magnum material is included in Volume 25b.

== Plot introduction ==
It is concerned mainly with Queen Mary's imprisonment at Lochleven Castle in 1567, her escape, and her defeat. Parallel to this is the romance of Roland Graeme, a naive but spirited youth. He is brought up at the castle of Avenel by Mary Avenel and her husband, Halbert Glendinning. Roland is sent by the Regent Murray to be page to Mary Stuart with directions to guard her. He falls in love with Catherine Seyton, who is one of the ladies-in-waiting to the queen. He is found later to be the heir to Avenel. Edward Glendinning, the brother of Halbert, is the abbot of the title, the last abbot of the monastery described in the preceding novel.

== Plot summary ==
Ten years had passed since the final events of The Monastery, during which Halbert had been knighted for his services to the regent, and Lady Avenel had adopted Roland, whom her dog had saved from drowning. The boy grew up petted by his mistress, but disliked by her chaplain and servants; and at length, having threatened to dirk the falconer, he was dismissed to seek his fortune. He had been secretly taught the Romish faith by Father Ambrose, and led by his grandmother to believe that he was of gentle birth. She now introduced him to Catherine Seyton, and then accompanied him to the abbey, where the revels of some masqueraders were interrupted by the arrival of Sir Halbert on his way to Edinburgh, who attached the youth to his train. On reaching the capital he aided Lord Seyton in a street fray, and was introduced to the Earl of Murray, who desired him to be ready to travel at short notice. In company with Adam Woodcock he adjourned to an inn, and was entrusted by Henry Seyton (whom he believed to be Catherine in male attire) with a sword, which he was not to unsheath until commanded by his rightful sovereign. He then learnt that he was to be attached to the household of Queen Mary, and accompanied Lord Lindesay to the castle of Lochleven, situated on an island, where he found Catherine in attendance on her, and was present when, in compliance with a note contained in his sword-sheath, she signed her abdication at the behest of the Secret Council.

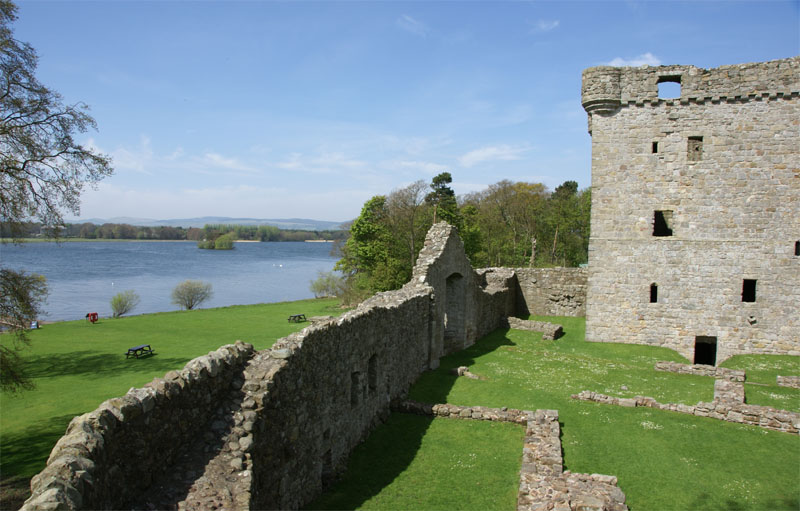
Loch Leven Castle

After a lapse of several months, during which Henderson attempted to convert him, Roland learnt from Catherine that Father Ambrose had been evicted from his monastery, and he pledged himself, for her sake, to assist the imprisoned queen in recovering her freedom. A plan of escape arranged by George Douglas having failed through the vigilance of the Lady of Lochleven, Roland undertook to forge a false set of keys, and the abbot arrived disguised as a man-at-arms sent by Sir William to take part in guarding the castle. As soon as the curfew had tolled, a preconcerted signal was made from the shore, and Roland contrived to substitute his forged keys for the real ones. At midnight the garden gate was unlocked, a boat was in waiting, Henry Seyton came forward, and the queen, with all her adherents, was safely afloat, when the alarm was given. Roland, however, had run back, ere they started, to turn the locks on their jailers, and, until they were out of reach of musketry, George Douglas protected Mary by placing himself before her. On landing, horses were in readiness, and before daybreak they reached Lord Seyton's castle in West Lothian, which was strongly garrisoned. The next morning, as the queen was endeavouring to make peace between Roland and Henry Seyton, who treated the page as a churl, his grandmother emerged from a recess and declared him to be the son of Julian Avenel, who was killed in the battle with Sir John Foster; Lord Seyton also recognised him, and insisted that his son should shake hands with him.

Supported by a considerable number of adherents in battle array, and accompanied by the abbot, the royal party moved onwards for Dumbarton, where help from France was expected. They were, however, intercepted by the regent's forces, and a desperate battle ensued. The queen stood near a yew tree, guarded by her devoted admirer George Douglas in close armour, while her page pushed forward to watch the conflict. It had lasted nearly an hour, when Sir Halbert attacked the flank of Mary's supporters, and they were completely routed, Henry Seyton was killed, and Douglas, who was mortally wounded, expired without withdrawing his eyes from her face. Hopeless of further aid, the queen adopted the fatal resolution of trusting to Elizabeth's mercy, and, having bid adieu to her followers, took ship for England. Roland soon afterwards succeeded in obtaining proofs of his claim as the heir of Avenel, and was married to Catherine on her return from two years residence with her unhappy mistress.

== Characters ==
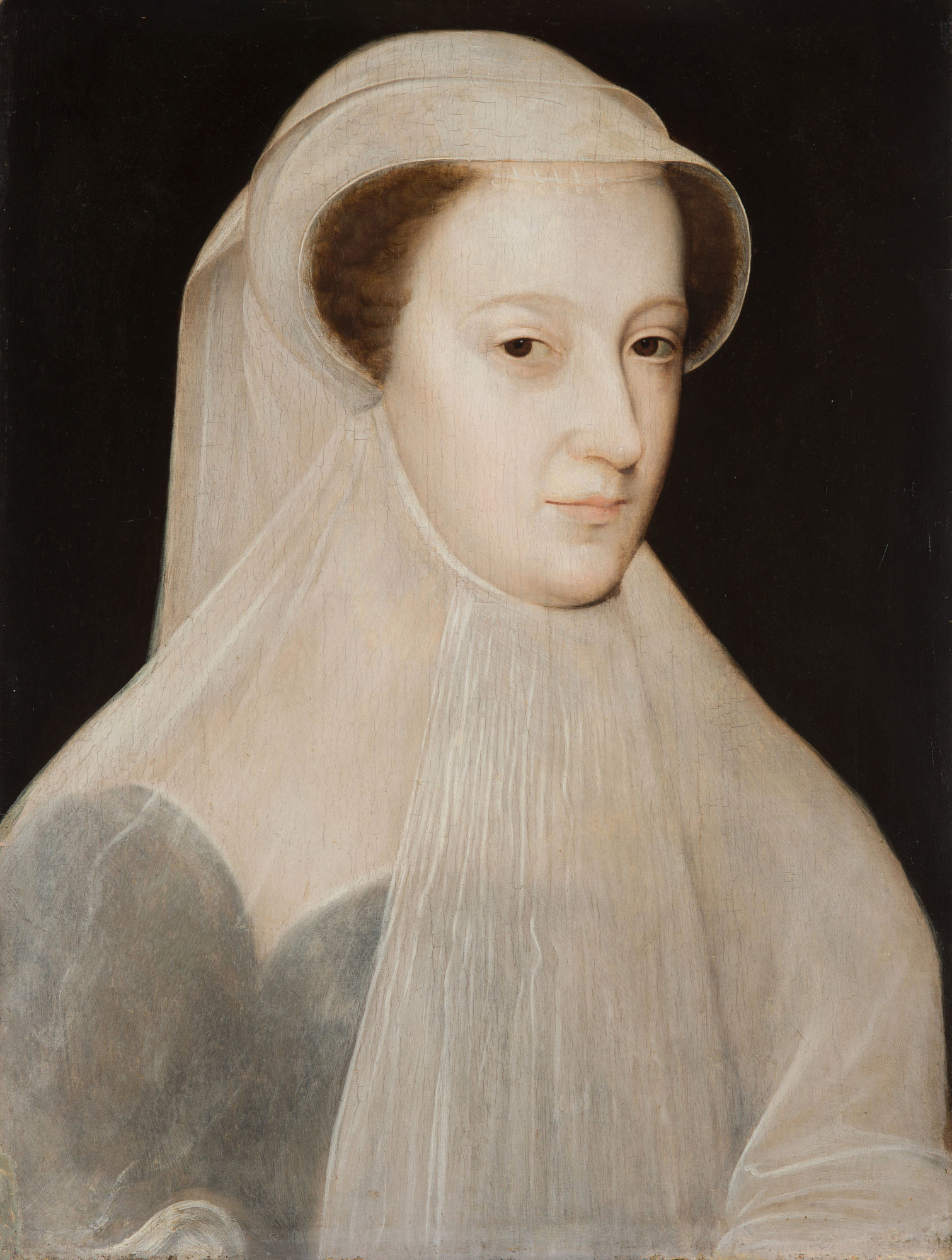
Mary, Queen of Scots, around 1560

(principal characters in bold; Douglas family relationships as in the Edinburgh Edition)

- **Sir Halbert Glendinning**, of Avenel
- **Lady Glendinning**, his wife
- Lilias Bradbourne, her handmaid
- **Adam Woodcock**, Sir Halbert's falconer
- Jasper Wingate, Sir Halbert's steward
- **Roland Græme**
- **Magdalen Græme**, his grandmother, alias Mother Nicneven
- **Henry Warden**, a preacher
- **Father Ambrose** (Edward Glendinning), Abbot of St Mary's
- Lord Seyton
- **Henry Seyton**, his son
- **Catherine Seyton**, Henry's sister
- Mother Bridget, her aunt
- James Stewart, Earl of Moray, Regent of Scotland
- Michael Wing-the-Wind, his domestic
- James Douglas, Earl of Morton
- Lord Ruthven
- Lord Lindesay
- Sir Robert Melville
- **The Lady of Lochleven**
- Sir William Douglas, her eldest son
- **George Douglas**, her third son
- **Dryfesdale**, her steward
- Randal, her boatman
- Dr Luke Lundin, her chamberlain in Kinross
- **Mary, Queen of Scots**
- Lady Mary Fleming, her attendant
- Elias Henderson, a chaplain

== Chapter summary ==
Introductory Epistle: The Author of Waverley writes to Captain Clutterbuck apologising for cutting so much from the Benedictine manuscript entrusted to his care: notably the White Lady has been excised, as has much enthusiastic Catholicism associated with Magdalen Graeme and the Abbot, making the title less apposite than originally intended.

Volume One

Ch.1: The stag-hound Wolf rescues a boy [Roland Græme] from the lake at Avenel, but both dog and the preacher Warden disapprove of the Lady's affection for the child.

Ch. 2: Magdalen Græme, Roland's grandmother, who is under a compulsion not to remain long in one place, agrees that he should be brought up in the castle.

Ch. 3: Returning to the castle after some months, Sir Halbert agrees that Roland should remain as the Lady's page. The boy's indulgent upbringing alienates Warden among others.

Ch. 4: Roland's behaviour continues to cause concern. When Warden attacks him in a severe sermon at family worship he leaves the congregation.

Ch. 5: Roland and the Lady have high words, and it is agreed he should quit the castle.

Ch. 6: Lilias the handmaid and Wingate the steward welcome Roland's departure and suspect him of popish sympathies.

Ch. 7: Roland meets his companion Ralph Fisher, who is unimpressed by his new situation. He is cheered up by Adam Woodcock the falconer, who lends him money.

Ch. 8: Roland meets Magdalen at a ruined sanctuary, and she speaks with Catholic enthusiasm of his high destiny.

Ch. 9: With some reluctance Roland promises Magdalen to be obedient to the Catholic cause, having been secretly instructed in the faith at Avenel by Fr Ambrose (Edward Glendinning).

Ch. 10: Roland and Magdalen arrive at a community of religious sisters, where he is introduced to Catherine Seyton.

Ch. 11: Roland and Catherine become acquainted.

Ch. 12: Magdalen insists that Roland and Catherine embrace as companions in the cause, incurring the disapproval of Catherine's aunt, Mother Bridget. Preparations are made for leaving the community.

Ch. 13: Magdalen and Roland travel to the now desolate monastery of Kennaquhair where Ambrose is being installed as abbot.

Ch. 14: The mob of misrule enter the church and Roland stabs the Abbot of Unreason at their head.

Ch. 15: The Abbot of Unreason turns out to be unhurt, and when Sir Halbert arrives and quells the disturbance he is revealed as Adam Woodcock. Roland agrees to join Sir Halbert's service.

Volume Two

Ch. 1 (16): Roland takes the road to Edinburgh, guided by Adam who indicates he is to enter the service of the Earl of Moray.

Ch. 2 (17): In Edinburgh, Roland impulsively joins in an affray on behalf of the Seytons and is rewarded with a gold chain and medal by Lord Seyton.

Ch. 3 (18): At Holyrood, Michael Wing-the-Wind fills Adam in on the political situation before conducting Roland to deliver a letter from Sir Halbert to Moray, who is impressed by his spirit. He overhears Moray and the Earl of Morton engaged in political bargaining.

Ch. 4 (19): Roland and Adam go to St Michael's inn where a page, taken by Roland to be Catherine in disguise [in fact, her twin brother Henry], gives him a sword to be drawn only for his lawful sovereign, before striking Adam for singing an anti-papist song.

Ch. 5 (20): Moray tells Roland he is to enter the service of Mary Queen of Scots and watch out for any suspicious activity. Roland travels to Lochleven with Lord Lindesay and Sir Robert Melville.

Ch. 6 (21): Arriving at the island castle, the party is received by the Lady of Lochleven, who spars verbally with Mary. After some delay Mary tells Roland to admit Lindesay and Melville.

Ch. 7 (22): Mary at first refuses to sign the abdication document now brought by Lord Ruthven, but the sheath of the sword given to Roland in Ch. 19 is found to contain a message from Lord Seyton advising her to agree. This is also Melville's advice, and the abdication accordingly takes place.

Ch. 8 (23): Roland and Catherine share a meal with Lady Mary Fleming, after which Catherine denies that she was the St Michael's page.

Ch. 9 (24): As time passes, Roland is increasingly influenced by Elias Henderson, the Protestant chaplain. George Douglas warns him against attempting to leave the castle and reveals by his manner that he is attracted by Catherine, who proceeds to re-dedicate Roland to the Catholic cause.

Ch. 10 (25): Henderson works on Roland and he is given business to transact on shore.

Ch. 11 (26): Roland is subject to the attentions of the chamberlain in Kinross, Dr Luke Lundin, and they encounter Mother Nicneven [Magdalen in disguise], whom Lundin dismisses with contempt.

Volume Three

Ch. 1 (27): A[n apparent] maiden, who Roland takes to be Catherine [in fact, Henry in disguise], is brought before Lundin for hitting a jester at a rustic theatrical performance. Roland has an enigmatic conversation with her, and she says she will lead him to Mother Nicneven.

Ch. 2 (28): Mother Nicneven reveals herself as Magdalen and rebukes Roland. A retainer reveals himself as Father Ambrose: he receives from Roland a packet entrusted to him by George Douglas and confesses him. A gardener [Boniface, formerly Abbot of Melrose in The Monastery] complains of his hard life.

Ch. 3 (29): Back in the castle, after Mary and Lady Lochleven have sparred again Roland finds himself locked out in the garden and hears whispers.

Ch. 4 (30): The whisperers are George Douglas and the St Michael's page, who indicates to Roland that he is not Catherine. Mary's attempt at escape is thwarted. She spars yet again with Lady Lochleven, who expresses her desire for revenge to her steward Dryfesdale. Roland rejects Dryfesdale's attempt to secure his allegiance.

Ch. 5 (31): Roland and Catherine bond in common devotion to Mary. Mary, anxious for them, is provoked to an outburst of passion by a recollection of Darnley's murder, which Catherine then explains to Roland. Roland denies Dryfesdale entry to Mary's presence.

Ch. 6 (32): Dryfesdale tells Lady Lochleven he has poisoned Mary with material from Mother Nicneven which he had intended to use on Roland in particular. Roland and Catherine make Lady Lochleven believe Mary has drunk the poison, but Magdalen arrives with Lundin and it becomes clear that this is not the case, and in any event the liquid was harmless.

Ch. 7 (33): Resigned to his fate, Dryfesdale undertakes to deliver a message from Lady Lochleven to her son Moray advocating his death, but on the way he is stabbed by Henry Seyton: George Douglas arrives to witness his last moments.

Ch. 8 (34): Randal announces Dryfesdale's death and Roland realises he has been confused by the close resemblance between Catherine and her brother. Plans are made for another attempt to free Mary, involving the forging of a duplicate set of keys.

Ch. 9 (35): Abbot Ambrose arrives in disguise to participate in the successful escape. It becomes clear that the gardener at Kinross is the former abbot Boniface.

Ch. 10 (36): George Douglas escorts Mary to Niddrie castle where she consults with her nobles. Magdalen reveals Roland's parentage, but Henry Seyton, taking him to be illegitimate, continues to reject his aspiration to Catherine's hand.

Ch. 11 (37): Ambrose checks Roland's military enthusiasm with a realistic assessment. At the battle of Langside Mary's forces are defeated, and Henry Seyton and George Douglas both fall.

Ch. 12 (38): At Dundrennan abbey, Ambrose and Roland encounter Boniface, still a gardener, who tells how Julian Avenel's marriage certificate had been taken from him by troopers under Sir Halbert. Mary leaves for England in spite of Ambrose's misgivings. Adam produces the certificate of the marriage performed by Father Phillip, and Roland is recognised as heir to Avenel. After two years he marries Catherine, in spite of his formal adoption of Protestantism.

== Reception ==
Reviewers generally welcomed The Abbot as a return to form after The Monastery (the absence of the White Lady being particularly noted), and some even saw the novel as ranking with Waverley. Mary Queen of Scots attracted much praise, though often qualified by disappointment at her fondness for sarcasm. Catherine was found striking, but her twin brother confused the reader's view of her. In their different ways George Douglas and Adam Woodcock were judged admirable as moral touchstones. There was criticism of Roland's instability, and his grandmother Magdalen came over as a clumsy over-used type. The conduct of the narrative divided reviewers: some found it loose, others well controlled. The scenes in Edinburgh and the escape from Lochleven were highlighted as particularly effective. Several reviewers commented favourably on the depiction of monastic life and on the even-handed treatment of the religious divide.

== Allusions and references ==
The novel is briefly mentioned in James Joyce's short story "Araby".
