= The Monastery: A Romance =

1820 novel by Walter Scott

The Monastery
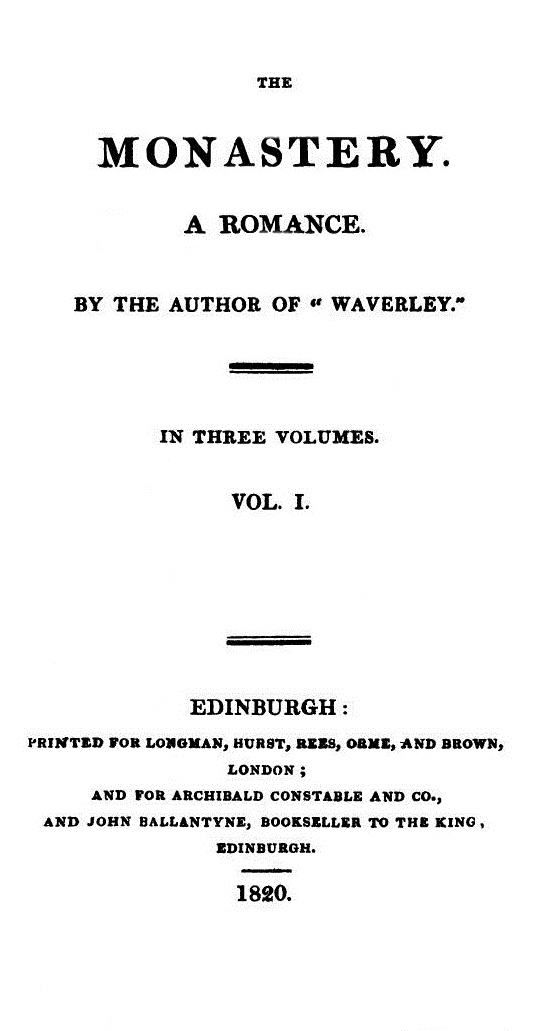
- First edition title page
- Author: Walter Scott
- Language: English, Lowland Scots
- Series: Waverley novels
- Genre: Historical novel
- Publisher: Archibald Constable, and John Ballantyne (Edinburgh); Longman, Hurst, Rees, Orme, and Brown (London)
- Publication date: 23 March 1820
- Publication place: Scotland
- Media type: Print
- Pages: 354 (Edinburgh Edition, 2000)
- Preceded by: Ivanhoe
- Followed by: The Abbot
- Text: The Monastery at Wikisource

The Monastery: a Romance (1820) is a historical novel by Walter Scott, one of the Waverley novels. Set in the Scottish Borders in the 1550s on the eve of the Scottish Reformation, it is centred on Melrose Abbey.

== Composition and sources ==
Scott had been contemplating The Monastery before August 1819, and it seems likely that he started writing it in that month while the production of Ivanhoe was at a standstill because of shortage of paper. He had determined on the title by the middle of the month. It also seems likely that he took up composition again shortly after finishing Ivanhoe in early November. He made good progress, and the third and final volume was at the press by the end of February 1820. Originally the story was intended to include Mary Queen of Scots, but a decision to reserve the later material for a second novel (The Abbot) was probably made before composition resumed in November.

Scott was intimately familiar with the history and topography of the Border region, and there is no evidence that he was following any formal written histories in detail. But two publications were useful to him for particular aspects of the novel. For sixteenth-century monastic life he was indebted to British Monachism; or, Manners and Customs of the Monks and Nuns of England by Thomas Dudley Fosbrooke, of which he owned an enlarged edition published in 1817. Shafton's euphuistic speech owes something to Euphues: The Anatomy of Wit (1578) and Euphues and his England (1580) by John Lyly, though affected speeches in the plays of Jonson and Shakespeare were more consistently mined.

== Editions ==
The first edition of The Monastery, in three volumes, was published in Edinburgh by Archibald Constable and John Ballantyne on 23 March 1820, and in London by Longman, Hurst, Rees, Orme, and Brown on the 30th. The print run was 10,000 and the price £1 4s (£1.20). As with all the Waverley novels before 1827 publication was anonymous. There is no reason to suppose that Scott was involved with the novel again until the beginning of 1830 when he revised the text and added an introduction and notes for the 'Magnum' edition, where it appeared as Volumes 18 and 19 in November and December that year.

The standard modern edition, by Penny Fielding, was published in 2000 as Volume 9 of the Edinburgh Edition of the Waverley Novels: it is based on the first edition with emendations mainly from the manuscript; the Magnum material is included in Volume 25b.

== Plot introduction ==
The action is centred on the Monastery of Kennaquhair, probably based on Melrose Abbey in south east Scotland, on the River Tweed. At this time, circa 1550, the Scottish Reformation is just beginning, and the monastery is in peril.

A love story is interwoven as the Glendinning boys fall in love with Mary Avenel. Edward ends up becoming a monk, and Halbert finally marries Mary, after service with the Earl of Murray.

== Plot summary ==
In the many conflicts between England and Scotland the property of the Church had hitherto always been respected; but her temporal possessions, as well as her spiritual influence, were now in serious danger from the spread of the doctrines of the Reformation, and the occupants of the monasteries were dependent on the military services of their tenants and vassals for protection against the forays of Protestant barons and other heretical marauders. Dame Elspeth's husband Simon had fallen in the battle of Pinkie (1547), and the hospitality of her lonely tower had been sought by the widow of the Baron of Avenel and her daughter Mary, whose mansion had been seized and plundered by invaders, and subsequently taken possession of by her brother-in-law Julian. While confessing the baroness on her death-bed, Father Philip discovered that she possessed a Bible, and as he was carrying it to the Lord Abbot, it was, he declared, taken from him by a spectral White Lady, a character resembling the Undine, which Scott borrowed from Friedrich de la Motte Fouqué's Undine. Disbelieving the sacristan's tale, the sub-prior visited the tower, where he met Christie of the Clinthill, a freebooter, charged with an insolent message from Julian Avenel, and learnt that the Bible had been mysteriously returned to its owner. Having exchanged it for a missal, he was unhorsed on his return by the apparition; and, on reaching the monastery, the book had disappeared from his bosom, and he found the freebooter detained in custody on suspicion of having killed him. The White Lady was next seen by Elspeth's son Halbert, who was conducted by her to a fairy grotto, where he was allowed to snatch the Bible from a flaming altar.

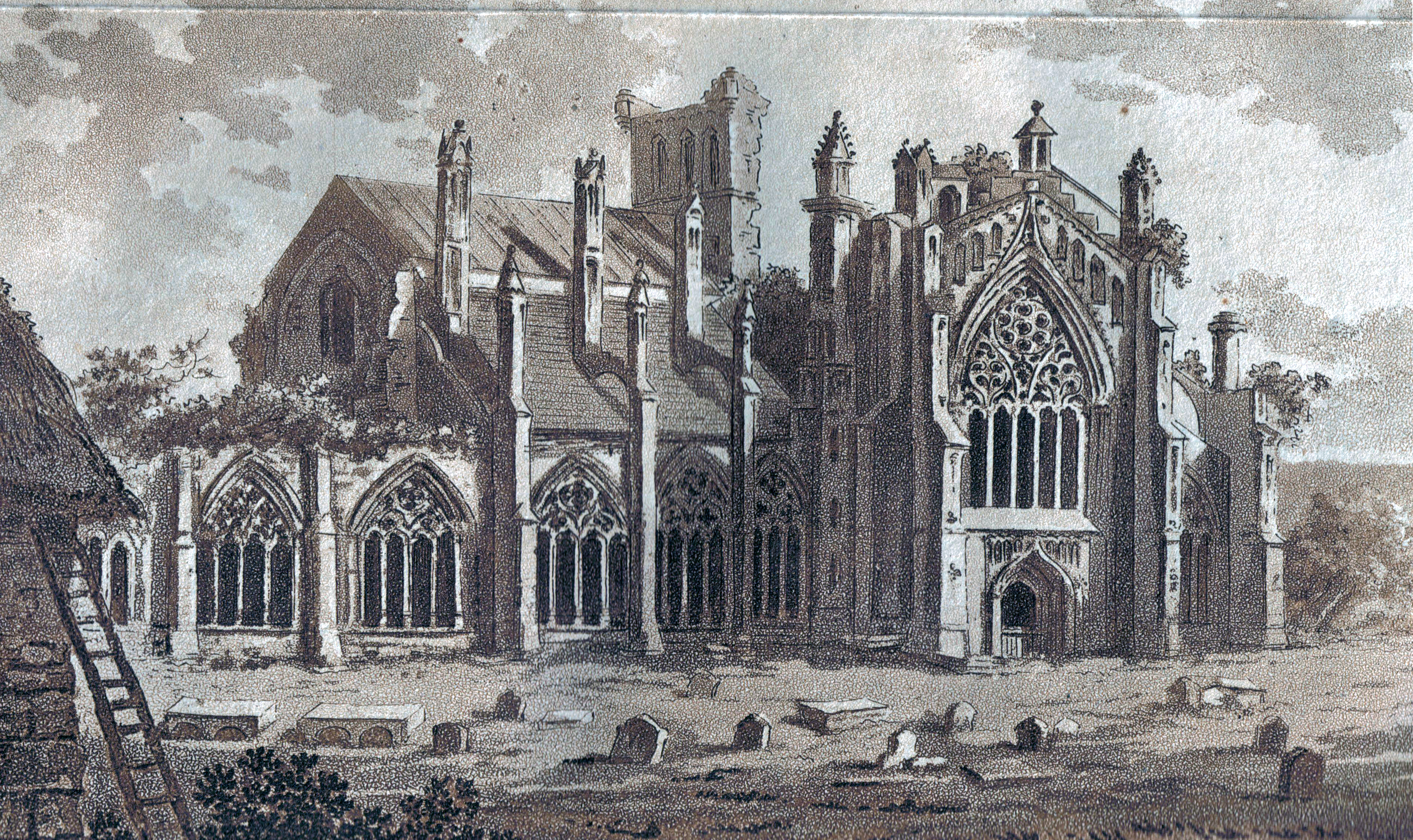
Melrose Abbey in 1800

During his absence from the tower, Happer the miller and his daughter Mysie arrived on a visit, and soon afterwards came Sir Piercie Shafton, as a refugee from the English Court. The next day the abbot came to dine with them, and offered Halbert, who had quarrelled with the knight for his attentions to Mary, the office of ranger of the Church forests. He, however, refused it, and startled his rival with a token he had obtained from the mysterious spectre. The following morning they fought in a glen, and Halbert fled to the Baron of Avenel, leaving Sir Piercie apparently mortally wounded. His companion thither was Henry Warden, who offended the laird, and assisted Halbert in his determination to escape from the castle, rather than serve under his host's standard. The knight, however, had miraculously recovered, and on making his way back to the tower, was accused by Edward of having murdered his missing brother, in spite of his assurance that the youth was alive and uninjured. With the sub-prior's approval he was treated as a prisoner; but during the night Mysie assisted him to escape, and accompanied him northwards, dressed as his page. Mary Avenel, meanwhile, in the midst of her grief at the supposed death of her lover, was visited by the White Lady, who comforted her by disclosing the place where he had hidden the Bible, which she had secretly read with her mother.

The rest of the family were astounded by the arrival of Christie, who confirmed Sir Piercie's assertion, and announced that he had brought Henry Warden to be dealt with as a heretic by the lord abbot. But the preacher and Father Eustace had been intimate friends at college, and the sub-prior was urging him to save his life by returning to the bosom of the Church, when Edward interrupted them to confess his jealousy of his brother, and his resolution to become a monk, in obedience to the White Lady who had appeared to him. Father Eustace then decided to leave his prisoner at the tower, under promise to surrender when summoned to the monastery; and, having learnt from the freebooter that Julian Avenel would fight for the Church, despatched him in search of Sir Piercie and the miller's daughter. That same night the lord abbot, alarmed by intelligence that English and Scottish soldiers were advancing with hostile intentions against the monastery, resigned his office to the sub-prior. Having taken the road to Edinburgh, Halbert had joined a squadron commanded by the Earl of Murray, who sent him forward to prevent an engagement between the English, under Sir John Forster, and the supporters of the Church, under the Baron of Avenel. He arrived too late, but the earl induced Sir John, who had won the battle, to withdraw, and marched his troops to St Mary's. Here the new abbot had assembled his brotherhood in the village, in anticipation of the destruction of their home. The regent and his followers formed up facing them, and the first matter settled was the marriage of Halbert with the heiress of Avenel. Father Eustace was then summoned to produce Sir Piercie, who surrendered voluntarily, and a flaw in his pedigree having been proved, Mysie was declared a fitting wife for him, and they were shipped off to Flanders. The monks, at the intercession of Henry Warden, were allowed to retain their monastery and lands on condition of being laid under contribution; while Edward, who had sought another interview with the White Spirit, was told that the knot of fate was tied, and impressed with the belief that the marriage of his brother with Mary Avenel might prove fatal to both of them.

== Characters ==
(principal characters in bold)

- **Elspet Glendinning**, of Glendearg
- **Halbert** and **Edward**, her sons
- Captain Stawarth Bolton, an English officer
- Brittson, his sergeant
- **Alice, the Lady of Avenel**
- **Mary**, her daughter
- **Julian Avenel**, her brother-in-law
- Catherine of Newport, his partner
- Martin Tacket, a shepherd
- Tibb, his wife
- **Boniface**, Abbot of St Mary's monastery
- **Father Philip**, the sacristan
- **Father Eustace**, the sub-prior
- Christie of Clinthill, a freebooter
- Happer (Hob Miller)
- **Mysie**, his daughter
- **Sir Piercie Shafton**, an English courtier
- **Henry Warden**, a preacher
- James, Earl of Moray, Regent of Scotland
- Sir John Foster, an English Warden
- James Douglas, Earl of Morton
- A pedlar
- **The White Lady of Avenel**, a spirit

== Chapter summary ==
Introductory Epistle: Captain Clutterbuck, a retired captain living in Kennaquhair [Melrose], writes to the Author of Waverley telling of a visit by a Benedictine monk to retrieve from the monastery ruins the buried heart of the sixteenth-century Abbot Ambrose, and leaving for publication an account of the events of the period which Clutterbuck hopes the Author will undertake, making any improvements he thinks appropriate.

Answer by the Author of Waverley: The Author replies, accepting the commission, and defending his profession as a writer of fiction, of which Clutterbuck himself is a product.

Volume One

Ch. 1: A sketch of the history and state of the monastic vassals at Kennaquhair.

Ch. 2: A sketch of the situation and history of the tower of Glendearg. Stawarth Bolton and his English foraying party are received with defiance by Elspet Glendinning's two young sons, Halbert and Edward, but he offers the tower immunity.

Ch. 3: Threatened with English plundering, Lady Avenel and her household are helped by a spirit [the White Lady] to reach the safety of Glendearg on All-Hallow Eve.

Ch. 4: Lady Avenel's brother-in-law Julian usurps the Avenel house and lands. On All-Hallow Eve three years later Mary Avenel sees her late father's spirit. Elspet and Tibb discuss the supernatural appearances.

Ch. 5: Two years later, Father Philip, sent to minister to the dying Lady of Avenel, seizes her vernacular bible. On his way back to Melrose he is ducked in the River Tweed by the White Lady, who sings in the process.

Ch. 6: Abbot Boniface summons Father Eustace to discuss the campaign against heresy.

Ch. 7: Philip, haunted by the White Lady's song, tells Eustace, and next day Boniface, what happened. Eustace leaves for Glendearg to investigate.

Ch. 8: Eustace questions Elspet about the Lady of Avenel and learns that her bible was mysteriously restored to her. The Lady dies.

Ch. 9: Eustace quarrels with Christie of Clinthill over arrangements for the Lady's funeral. He gives Edward a missal in place of the bible, but on his way back to the monastery he is attacked and dispossessed of the volume.

Ch. 10: Christie confesses to Eustace and Boniface that he was Eustace's attacker, but he had been interrupted by the White Lady. He is pardoned, to avoid offending Julian of Avenel. Eustace tells Boniface in confession of the events of the day, which he suspects may have been a punishment for his uncharitable interpretation of Philip's adventure; he is irked by the Abbot's pompous and patronising attitude but submits to his authority.

Ch. 11: Two or three years pass. Eustace tries in vain to persuade Elspet and Edward that the lad should become a novice. Halbert rejects Edward's bookishness and summons the White Lady in a secluded ravine.

Volume Two

Ch. 1 (12): The White Lady conducts Halbert to a cavern where he snatches the bible from an unconsuming fire.

Ch. 2 (13): Elspet entertains Hob Miller and his daughter Mysie, who she thinks would make a good wife for Halbert.

Ch. 3 (14): Mary and Mysie observe Christie and Sir Piercie Shafton arrive at Glendearg: Edward is cowed by Shafton, but Halbert is visibly unimpressed.

Ch. 4 (15): Shafton and Halbert quarrel. Boniface arrives at Glendearg.

Ch. 5 (16): Shafton explains to Boniface and Eustace that he has been forced to flee from England because of his support of the Catholic faction. The monks agree that it would be prudent for him to stay at Glendearg rather than being accommodated at the monastery.

Ch. 6 (17): Martin urges patience on Halbert after his reaction to Shafton. Halbert summons the White Lady and receives from her a bodkin to display to Shafton when he is next boastful.

Ch. 7 (18): Boniface proposes to appoint Halbert bow-bearer in the monastic forest.

Ch. 8 (19): Halbert declines the position of bow-bearer, intending to make his fortune elsewhere. He disconcerts Shafton by showing him the bodkin. Shafton assures Boniface and Eustace that his reaction was attributable to a habitual malady.

Ch. 9 (20): Shafton and Halbert arrange a meeting to settle their account. The White Lady urges Halbert on.

Ch. 10 (21): Mary tries to dissuade Halbert from the duel, but he proceeds to fell Shafton.

Ch. 11 (22): Halbert leaves Shafton to seek help from a passing stranger, but when they reach the site of the duel they find only a newly-filled grave. The stranger asks Halbert to accompany him to Avenel.

Ch. 12 (23): Halbert is dismayed to learn that the stranger is the preacher Henry Warden. They reach Avenel.

Ch. 13 (24): Warden and Halbert are received at the castle by Julian and his partner Catherine of Newport.

Ch. 14 (25): Warden rebukes Julian for his relationship with Catherine, impressing Halbert, who agrees to escape from the castle and take a letter from the preacher to the leader of an advancing body of horse [the Earl of Moray].

Volume Three

Ch. 1 (26): Shafton returns to Glendearg and has difficulties in presenting a credible story.

Ch. 2 (27): Eustace finds Shafton's account improbable, but he urges moderation on Edward who is seeking revenge for his brother's supposed death.

Ch. 3 (28): Mysie helps Shafton to escape from detention at Glendearg.

Ch. 4 (29): Mysie disguises herself as a page so as to continue to accompany Shafton.

Ch. 5 (30): During the confusion at Glendearg following the discovery of Shafton's escape, Mary discovers the bible in a spot indicated by the White Lady. Christie arrives to announce that Halbert is alive, and Edward leaves to investigate the site of the duel.

Ch. 6 (31): Christie delivers up Warden who has a debate with Eustace, recognising him as an old college companion.

Ch. 7 (32): Edward returns to report that there is no trace of a grave at the site of the duel, and Warden and Eustace continue their debate. Edward confesses to Eustace his jealousy of Halbert, whom Mary prefers to himself, and decides (prompted by the White Lady) to become a novice.

Ch. 8 (33): Warden promises Eustace to remain at Glendearg and appear when summoned. Christie tells Eustace that Julian is prepared to serve the monastery, but Eustace is reluctant to reward him for his change of allegiance with land belonging to a neighbour.

Ch. 9 (34): In the face of the threatening English forces Boniface resigns in favour of Eustace.

Ch. 10 (35): In company with a pedlar encountered on his journey, Halbert meets up with the Earl of Moray and enters his service.

Ch. 11 (36): Later in the year, arriving at the site of a battle between monastic and English forces, Halbert rescues the infant son of Julian and Catherine, who both die, as does Christie. Moray makes peace with the English commander Sir John Foster.

Ch. 12 (37): Kennaquhair is reprieved, for the time being. Shafton is exposed as a tailor and marries Mysie. Halbert marries Mary. Edward hears the White Lady sing of the downfall of Avenel.

== Reception ==
The Monastery was found disappointing after Ivanhoe by most reviewers, exhaustion and haste being suggested as likely causes. There were the usual complaints about weak plotting. But the remarks were far from being universally negative. Even the White Lady, though often found intrusive, over-dominant, puzzling, or just absurd, prompted a number of positive reactions: her poetry was praised, and some reviewers found her striking, powerful, and even sublime. Shafton similarly divided opinion: although he was judged tiresome by some, there was considerable appreciation of his entertainment value, even when he was found to have outstayed his welcome. The author was welcomed back to his home ground, and his landscape descriptions were generally judged excellent, as were the confrontations between the principal characters. The introductory epistles attracted high praise, with only a couple of dissenting voices.
