= Kevin Hogan (footballer, born 1934) =

Australian rules footballer (1934–2019)

Personal information
- Full name: Kevin John Hogan
- Born: 6 October 1934; Violet Town
- Died: 5 November 2019 (aged 85); Sale
- Original teams: Benalla, Violet Town
- Height: 171 cm (5 ft 7 in)
- Weight: 73 kg (161 lb)
- Position: Rover

Playing career^{1}
Years	Club	Games (Goals)
1954–58, 1960	South Melbourne	63 (35)
- ^{1} Playing statistics correct to the end of 1960.

Kevin Hogan OAM (6 October 1934 – 5 November 2019) was an Australian rules footballer who played with South Melbourne in the Victorian Football League (VFL).

Hogan initially played with Benalla "Colts" / Thirds in 1949 in the Benalla & District Football League, then played with Violet Town, making his senior football debut in 1950 as a 15 year old in the Benalla Tungamah Football League. He continued to play with Violet Town until 1953, including their 1952 Benalla Tungamah Football League grand final loss to Benalla, prior to playing with South Melbourne.

Hogan was hailed as one of the VFL recruits of the year in 1954!

He later played, coached and was on the committee of the Sale Football Club. He also was a journalist for the Gippsland Times and worked for ABC Local Radio in Gippsland for over 50 years.

In the 1983 Queen's Birthday Honours Hogan was awarded the Medal of the Order of Australia for " service to the sports of cricket and football ".

Brother of former South Melbourne footballers, Pat Hogan and Frank Hogan.
