= Pat Hogan (footballer) =

Australian rules footballer (1930–2017)

Personal information
- Full name: Pat Hogan
- Born: 19 November 1930
- Died: 17 August 2017 (aged 86)
- Original teams: Violet Town, South Melbourne District
- Height: 174 cm (5 ft 9 in)
- Weight: 77 kg (170 lb)

Playing career^{1}
Years	Club	Games (Goals)
1953–54	South Melbourne	10 (6)
- ^{1} Playing statistics correct to the end of 1954.

Pat Hogan (9 November 1930 – 17 August 2017) was an Australian rules footballer who played with South Melbourne in the Victorian Football League (VFL).

Hogan won the 1951 Metropolitan Football League best and fairest award and the South Melbourne Districts Football Club best and fairest award, prior to being recruited by South Melbourne FC.

Brother of former South Melbourne footballers, Kevin Hogan and Frank Hogan.
