= Bobby Mullenger =

Australian rules footballer

Personal information
- Full name: Robert James Mullenger
- Born: 22 July 1916; Fairfield, Victoria
- Died: 11 October 1983 (aged 67); Cowes, Victoria
- Original team: Beechworth (OKFL)
- Height: 173 cm (5 ft 8 in)
- Weight: 71 kg (157 lb)

Playing career^{1}
Years	Club	Games (Goals)
1939–1940, 1946	South Melbourne	6 (1)
- ^{1} Playing statistics correct to the end of 1946.

Robert James Mullenger (22 July 1916 – 11 October 1983) was an Australian rules footballer who played with South Melbourne in the Victorian Football League (VFL).

Mullenger's career was interrupted by his service in the Australian Army during World War II, serving in Malaya and Singapore and spending three years in POW camps in Singapore, Burma and Thailand.

Mullenger's younger brother, Allan Mullenger, also played for South Melbourne.

== Sources ==
- Cullen, B. (2015) Harder than Football, Slattery Media Group: Melbourne. ISBN 9780992379148.
