= Glenrowan Football Club =

Glenrowan

Names
- Full name: Glenrowan Football Netball Club
- Nickname(s): Rovers, Kelly Tigers

2019 season

Club details
- Founded: 1894; 131 years ago
- Dissolved: 2019
- Colours
- Competition: Ovens & King Football League
- Premierships: (14): 1914, 1919, 1924, 1925, 1926, 1955, 1969, 1970, 1980, 1981, 2014, 2015, 2016, 2017.
- Ground: Glenrowan Recreation Ground (capacity: 5,000)

Uniforms
Away

Other information
- Official website: Glenrowan FNC

The Glenrowan Football Club was formed in 1905, when they played a match against Greta. The club spent most of its time in the Benalla & District Football League (1946 - 1991) and the Ovens & King Football League (1992 - 2019), when it folded after the 2019 season, due to a lack of players, off field officials, active past players and volunteers.

== History ==
Glenrowan's first documented match was against Winton in 1894, at Winton.

In 1910, Glenrowan wore red, blue and white vertical stripe football jumpers. Glenrowan won the first grand final against Greta South FC, but as Greta South has won the minor premiership, they had the right to challenge Glenrowan in another match for the premiership, in which Greta South won.

Glenrowan joined the Ovens & King Football League in 1992 and played there until 2019.

Three past players of Glenrowan have been awarded an Order of Australia award. They are Linton Briggs, Stuart Devlin and Bill O'Callaghan.

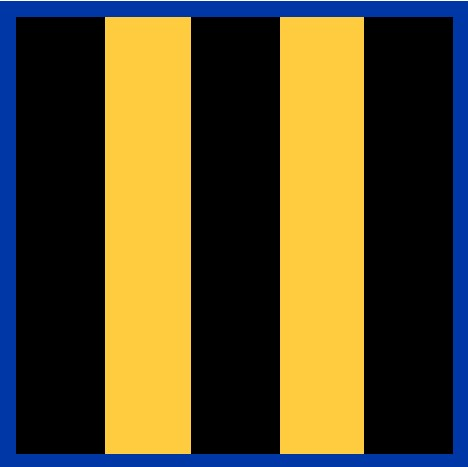
Glenrowan FC Jumper: 1946 - 55

== Competition Timeline ==
- 1894 - 1905: No official competitions entered, but did play many friendly matches against other local towns.
- 1906 - Greta & Glenrowan Football Association
- 1907 - Winton, Glenrowan Thoona Football Association
- 1908 - Winton Glenrowan Football Association
- 1909 - ?
- 1910 - 15 Mile Creek Football Association
- 1911 - Club in recess
- 1912 - North Eastern Wednesday Football Association
- 1913 - 14: Greta Glenrowan Football Association
- 1915 - 18: Club in recess. WW1
- 1919 - Greta / Thoona Football Association
- 1920 - 21: North East (Euroa) Football Association
- 1922 - 23: Wangaratta Football Association
- 1924 - 26: Greta / Thoona Football Association
- 1927 - Ovens & King Football League
- 1928 - 29: Glenrowan / Thoona Football Association
- 1930 - 31: ?
- 1932 - Euroa District Football Association
- 1933 - ?
- 1934 - 38: Tatong Thoona Football Association
- 1939 - 45: Club in recess, due to WW2
- 1946 - 91: Benalla & District Football League
- 1992 - 2019: Ovens & King Football League

== Football Grand Finals ==
Seniors

Year	Venue	Premiers	Score	Runner up	Score
1910	Greta West	Greta South	5.7 - 37	Glenrowan	0.8 - 8
1914	Benalla	Glenrowan	5.6 - 36	Greta	2.4 - 16
1919	Benalla	Glenrowan	4.19 - 43	Thoona	4.4 - 28
1925	Winton	Glenrowan	7.6 - 48	Winton	5.5 - 35
1926	Thoona	Glenrowan	5.8 - 38	Winton	4.7 - 31
1928	Winton	South Wang	16.10 - 106	Glenrowan	7.3 - 45
1934	Goorambat	Tatong	12.15 - 87	Glenrowan	10.6 - 66
1954	Benalla	Benalla All Blacks	12.14 - 86	Glenrowan	6.12 - 48
1955	Benalla	Glenrowan	14.9 - 93	Swanpool	9.16 - 70
1956	Benalla	Benalla All Blacks	13.10 - 88	Glenrowan	11.6 - 72
1957	Benalla	Swanpool	9.9 - 63	Glenrowan	7.14 - 56
1968	Benalla	Benalla All Blacks	13.16 - 94	Glenrowan	13.9 - 87
1969	Benalla	Glenrowan	13.14 - 92	Benalla All Blacks	11.9 - 75
1970	Benalla	Glenrowan	15.8 - 98	Benalla All Blacks	13.11 - 89
1971	Benalla	Benalla All Blacks	13.6 - 84	Glenrowan	11.4 - 70
1978	Benalla	Goorambat	16.16 - 112	Glenrowan	16.11 - 107
1979	Benalla	Goorambat	?	Glenrowan	?
1980	Benalla	Glenrowan	16.6 - 102	Tatong	15.7 - 97
1981	Benalla	Glenrowan	17.13 - 115	Tatong	14.11 - 95
2013	W J Findlay Oval	Milawa	15.16 - 106	Glenrowan	7.13 - 55
2014	W J Findlay Oval	Glenrowan	16.13 - 109	Milawa	10.8 - 68
2015	W J Findlay Oval	Glenrowan	9.13 - 67	Milawa	8.6 - 54
2016	W J Findlay Oval	Glenrowan	16.11 - 107	Tarrawingee	6.7 - 43
2017	W J Findlay Oval	Glenrowan	13.12 - 90	Benalla All Blacks	6.7 - 43

Reserves

Year	Venue	Premiers	Score	Runner up	Score
1985	Benalla Showgrounds	Tatong	14.10 - 94	Glenrowan	4.10 - 34
2005	Norm Minns Oval	Whorouly	5.2 - 32	Glenrowan	4.5 - 29
2009	Norm Minns Oval	Tarrawingee	8.8 - 56	Glenrowan	5.5 - 35
2015	W J Findlay Oval	King Valley	15.19 - 109	Glenrowan	10.9 - 69
2017	W J Findlay Oval	Bright	11.16 - 82	Glenrowan	6.3 - 39

== Football League Best & Fairest winners ==
Seniors

- Tatong Thoona Football League
  - 1934 - Harry Billman - 7 votes
  - 1937 - Larry O'Brien - 14 votes
- Benalla & District Football League
  - 1957 - John "Mac" Hill - ? votes
  - 1963 - Alan O'Brien -
  - 1969 - Neville Smedley - 31
  - 1976 - David McCullough -
  - 1978 - Fred Malloy - 23

Reserves

- Ovens & King Football League - (Ross Schutt Medal)
  - 2003 - Brad Laywood
  - 2004 - Brad Laywood
  - 2005 - Rick Lawford
  - 2009 - Brad Laywood
  - 2013 - Clayton Fraser
  - 2014 - Brad Laywood
  - 2017 - Trent Petersen

== Football Statistics ==
Consecutive finals series

- Between 1976 and 1981 Glenrowan played in four consecutive Benalla & District Football League finals series.

Consecutive grand finals

- Glenrowan have played in four consecutive Benalla & District Football League grand finals on three separate occasions. 1954 to 1957, 1968 to 1971 and 1978 to 1981. Glenrowan also played in five consecutive grand finals on the Ovens & King Football League from 2013 to 2017.

Consecutive match wins

- In 1983, Glenrowan won all their 18 home and away matches before losing the second semi and preliminary finals in the Benalla & District Football League.

== VFL / AFL Players ==
The following footballer played with Glenrowan, prior to playing AFL football.

- 2003: Karl Norman - Carlton

The following footballers played VFL / AFL football prior to playing / coaching Glenrowan FC. The year indicates their first season at Glenrowan.

- 1954 - Mac Hill - Collingwood
- 2009 - Steve Hickey - North Melbourne
- 2013 - Nathan Carroll - Melbourne
- 2016 - Brendan Fevola - Carlton
