= Frank Hogan (footballer) =

Australian rules footballer and coach

Personal information
- Full name: Francis Peter Hogan
- Born: 28 October 1936
- Died: 25 May 2025 (aged 88)
- Original teams: Violet Town, Benalla
- Height: 177 cm (5 ft 10 in)
- Weight: 73 kg (161 lb)

Playing career^{1}
Years	Club	Games (Goals)
1958–59	South Melbourne	12 (6)
- ^{1} Playing statistics correct to the end of 1959.

Francis Peter Hogan (28 October 1936 – 25 May 2025) was an Australian rules footballer who played with South Melbourne in the Victorian Football League (VFL).

Hogan played 14 Melbourne Premier Cricket first eleven games with South Melbourne.

Hogan played with West Adelaide Football Club from 1960 to 1962, playing in two SANFL grand finals, with a premiership in 1961. He played 58 games and kicked 120 goals in his three years with West Adelaide.

Hogan also played first eleven cricket with the Adelaide Cricket Club in 1960.

Hogan coached Tatura Football Club in 1963, then played in two consecutive Ovens and Murray Football League premierships for Wangaratta Rovers Football Club, in 1964 and 1965, coached Beechworth Football Club in 1966, then coached Redan Football Club to runners up in the Ballarat Football League in 1967.

Brother of former South Melbourne footballers, Pat Hogan and Kevin Hogan.
