= Robert Flanagan =

Robert Flanagan or Flanigan may refer to:

- Robert Flanagan (politician) (born 1945), American politician from Maryland
- Bob Flanagan (performance artist) (1952–1996), American performance artist and writer
- Bob Flanigan (singer) (1926–2011), American tenor vocalist and founding member of The Four Freshmen
- Bob Flanigan (footballer) (1914–1988), Australian rules footballer
- Bob Flanagan, programmer of the video game Marble Madness
- Rob Flanagan, contestant on season 2 of The Apprentice
