= Bill Fahey (footballer) =

Australian rules footballer

Personal information
- Full name: William Fahey
- Born: 23 May 1880; Dandenong, Victoria
- Died: 6 December 1937 (aged 57); Wonthaggi, Victoria
- Original team: Beechworth

Playing career^{1}
Years	Club	Games (Goals)
1902	South Melbourne	3 (1)
- ^{1} Playing statistics correct to the end of 1902.

William Fahey (23 May 1880 – 6 December 1937) was an Australian rules footballer who played with South Melbourne in the Victorian Football League (VFL).
