= North Wangaratta Football Club =

Australian rules football club

Names
- Full name: North Wangaratta Football Netball Club Incorporated.
- Nickname(s): Hawks

2025 season

Club details
- Founded: 1892; 133 years ago (entered O&KFL in 1961)
- Colours: Brown Gold
- Competition: Ovens and King Football League
- President: Allan Ely
- Premierships: 1958, 1973, 1976, 1997, 2012
- Ground(s): North Wangaratta Recreation Reserve (capacity: 7,000)
- (1914–2022)
- Training ground(s): North Wangaratta Recreation Reserve

Uniforms
Home	Away 1

Other information
- Official website: Wangaratta FNC website

The North Wangaratta Football / Netball Club is an Australian rules football club located 6 km north of Wangaratta in north east Victoria, Australia. The club currently competes in the Ovens & King Football League, which has two levels of football Reserves and Seniors. The League also caters for Netball which currently has five grades – 15 & Under, C Grade (U/17's), B Reserve, B Grade, and A Grade.

The football club is currently known for its above par irrigation system, which has been implemented within the last few years along with their 2 new netball courts, which means their facilities are among the best in the league.

== Football Competition History ==
- 1914 & 1915: Ovens & King Football League
- 1916 to 1918: Club in recess. World War I
- 1919 & 1920: Ovens & King Football League
- 1921: Club in recess
- 1922 to 1924: Wangaratta District Football Association
- 1925 to 1928: Club in recess
- 1929 to 1933: Ovens & King Football League
- 1934 to 1949: Club in recess
- 1950: Murray Valley & North East Football League
- 1951 & 1952: Benalla Tungamah Football League
- 1953 to 1960: Benalla & District Football League
- 1961 to present day: Ovens & King Football League

== Football Premierships ==
Seniors

- Benalla & District Football League
  - 1958 – North Wangaratta: 18.14 – 122 defeated Goorambat: 9.10 – 64
- Ovens & King Football League
  - 1973 – North Wangaratta: 16.17 – 113 defeated Chiltern: 13.8 – 86
  - 1976 – North Wangaratta: 22.16 – 148 defeated Beechworth: 7.11 – 53
  - 1997 – North Wangaratta: 22.14 – 146 defeated Greta: 8.14 – 62
  - 2012 – North Wangaratta: 20.10 – 130 defeated Whorouly: 12.11 – 83

Reserves

- Ovens & King Football League
  - 1962, 1996, 1997, 2003, 2012

Thirds

- Ovens & King Football League
  - 2010

== League Best & Fairest Winners ==
Senior Football

- Murray Valley & North East Football League
  - 1950 - Jack Smith
- Benalla & District Football League
  - 1960 - Kevin Allan - 22 votes
- Ovens & King Football League
  - 1973 - Eddie Flynn - 20 votes
  - 1983 - Neale McMonigle - 23
  - 1991 - Fred Pane - 32
  - 1993 - Mark Johns - 24
  - 2000 - Shane Driscoll - 26

== Netball Premierships ==
Ovens & King Football League

A. Grade

- 1979, 1980, 1981, 1982

C. Grade

- 2008

15 & Under

- 2019
