= Jack Flanigan =

Australian rules footballer, born 1905

Personal information
- Full name: John George Flanigan (5)
- Born: 29 April 1905; Oxley, Victoria
- Died: 30 September 1978 (aged 73); Kialla, Victoria
- Original team: Moyhu
- Height: 184 cm (6 ft 0 in)
- Weight: 83 kg (183 lb)

Playing career^{1}
Years	Club	Games (Goals)
1930	Hawthorn	5 (1)
- ^{1} Playing statistics correct to the end of 1930.

John George Flanigan, uses the family name Flanagan (29 April 1905 – 30 September 1978) was an Australian rules footballer who played with Hawthorn in the Victorian Football League (VFL). Throughout his career as a player, he played 5 games and scored 1 goal in that period of time.

Flanigan finished third in the 1933 Ovens & King Football League best and fairest award, the John Hughes Medal, when playing with the Moyhu Football Club.

Flanigan coached Beechworth in 1936 and 1937, which included the 1937 Ovens & King Football League premiership.

He was the older brother of Bob Flanigan from Footscray and Essendon.

== Notes ==
5. John George (Jack) used the family name Flanagan, his words - "that is what is on my birth record, that is who I am", the family name in inconsistent in birth records, his VFL playing brother Robert Edwin (Bob, Bluestone) used Flanigan - Ray Canning (nephew)
