= Beechworth Football Club =

Beechworth

Names
- Full name: Beechworth Football Netball Club
- Nickname: Bushrangers

2026 season
- After finals: 7th
- Home-and-away season: 7th
- Leading goalkicker: Lachlan Armstrong (16)
- Best and fairest: Kayde Surrey

Club details
- Founded: 1861; 165 years ago
- Colours
- Competition: TDFL
- President: Emma Carey & Daniel Cooper
- Coach: Clint Brunnenmeyer
- Captain: Cam Fendyk
- Premierships: 18 (senior football)
- Ground: Baarmutha Park, Beechworth (capacity: 5,000)

Uniforms
Home	Away

Beechworth Football & Netball Club, nicknamed the Bushrangers, is an Australian rules football and netball club based in Beechworth, Victoria. Its teams currently play in the Tallangatta & District Football League.

The club was known as the Beechworth Bombers prior to joining the Tallangatta & District Football League (T&DFNL), but they became the Bushrangers due to Dederang-Mount Beauty having the red and black colours and having the nickname of "Bombers".

Before playing the T&DFNL, Beechworth took part in the Ovens & Murray and the Ovens & King leagues.

== History ==
Local histories have claimed a football club was established at Beechworth in 1861, although contemporary evidence for this is lacking. The earliest references to football in the town are from 1864, when Beechworth Cricket Club played other residents on the Recreation Reserve for the "first game of football for this season". This wording suggests football was an established activity in Beechworth and matches had been played in a previous season.

By June 1864 a football club was operating with 32 members, with J. T. Goodsir serving as secretary. It was noted there was considerable local interest and there was a proposal for regular matches between teams representing different parts of the community. The club ordered footballs from Melbourne and proposed daily afternoon practice during the winter months.

Little evidence of organised football in Beechworth survives for the following years. In April 1872 a meeting was held at Dreyer's Corner Hotel to establish a new club. The new club played its first scratch match on the Beechworth Cricket Ground the same month, attracting around 40 players. A formal match between "Natives" (Australian-born) and "The World" (overseas-born) followed in May 1872, a common fixture format in that era.

The club was still active in 1873, although it subsequently declined and a meeting to establish yet another club was held at Allen's Star Hotel in April 1875. This does not appear to have been successful.

A slightly more successful revival occurred in 1876, when a Beechworth football club was formed and won a match against Chiltern on the Queen's Birthday. Reports nevertheless indicate football activity in the town was limited, with the Australasian observing in May 1877 that the game in Beechworth was "very quiet". A preliminary meeting to form a further football club was held at Tanswell's Hotel in May 1877. However, by July 1877 the Ovens and Murray Advertiser questioned if the new club had already ceased to function, with no practice sessions or matches organised.

The club was reorganised again in May 1878 at Allen's Star Hotel. Office-bearers were elected, subscriptions fixed, and it the club affiliated with the Victorian Football Association. The season opened with a scratch match on the Beechworth Cricket Ground. Although the club did not participate in a formal premiership competition during the 19th century, it regularly played matches against neighbouring Ovens and Murray towns, including Chiltern and Rutherglen.

In 1887, a football fixture was published in the Ovens and Murray Advertiser, with Beechworth FC competing against the following football clubs - Benalla, Degamero, Oxley, Oxley Trades and Wangaratta.

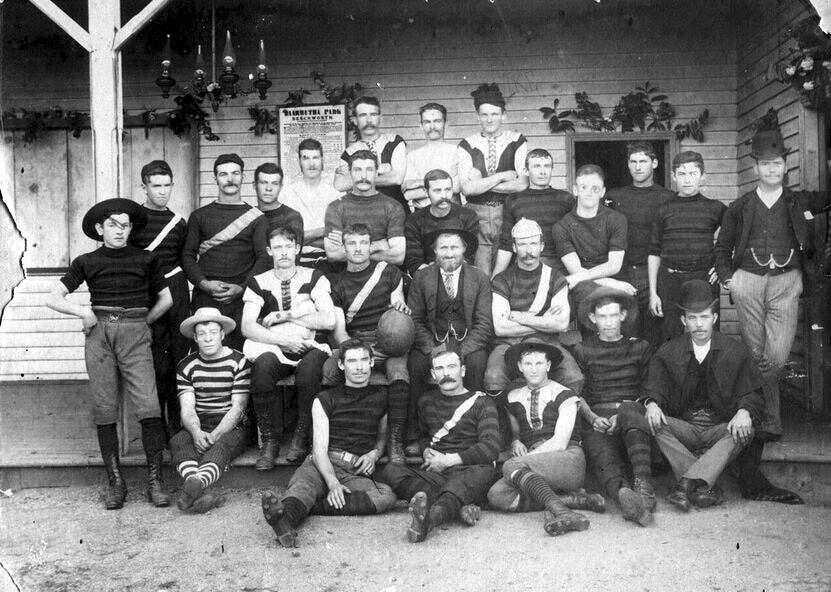
Team of Wanderers FC, 1890

In the late 1880s there were two football teams in Beechworth. One was the "Beechworth FC" and the other was the "Wanderers FC", which was based at Hurdle Flat, near Stanley and after a meeting between officials of both clubs in April 1892, they merged under the name "Beechworth District Wanderers Football Club" and adopted a red and black striped guernsey, before joining the Ovens and Murray Football League in 1893.

In September 1894, Essendon visited Beechworth and had a comfortable win over the “District Wanderers”.

The club played in the O&MFL until 1898, when they went into recess in 1899, they returned to the O&MFL from 1900 to 1902, then once again went into recess in 1903. Beechworth finished in equal top position with Corowa and Excelsoir in 1900, but Beechworth withdrew from the final series as they were drawn to play the first final at the Southern ground. Beechworth thought this to be grossly unjust and withdrew from the finals.

Beechworth FC then joined the North East Central Football Association in 1904. then joined the Ovens & King league in 1905, winning three consecutive premierships in 1912, 1913 and 1914. Beechworth then left the O&KFA and re-joined the O&MFL in 1915, only to withdraw from the competition in July 1915, due to "the splendid response by playing members of the club to the appeal for recruits to serve their King and country" in World War One.

The club suspended its activities from 1916 to 1918 during the World War I, returning to the O&KFL in 1919.

Beechworth then played the O&MFL from 1924 to 1928, then returned to the Ovens & King in 1929 until 1941. A new recess came in 1941 with the Second World War.

At the end of the Second World War, Beechworth entered the Chiltern and District league under the new name of the Beechworth Football Club. In 1946 it was admitted to the Ovens and King League and the next year a seconds team was formed and played in the Myrtleford-Bright District Football League from 1947 to 1949. This side and the thirds team were instigated by Ern Guppy, who was a wonderful man for the Beechworth Football Club. He was made a life member in 1952.

When the Myrtleford-Bright DFL folded in 1952, the seconds side joined the Yackandandah & District Football League.

In 1950, 1951 and 1956 Beechworth won senior premierships, and was beaten by only two points by Bogong for the 1955 O&KFL pennant.

In 1961 the club again won the premiership under Bill Comensoli. In this year it formed a thirds team, which was affiliated with the Wodonga Junior Football Association with Fred Jensen as its coach and G. Beel as its manager.

In 1974 under coach Mick Brenia it again was successful and D. Cooper had coached it to runners-up for two successive years, it won the 1979 flag under Rob Forrest.

There was no further success until 2000, when under coach Michael Quirk, it won two in a row, and was defeated by Moyhu in the 2002 grand final.

At the end of the 2003 season, The Beechworth Football Club applied for an application to join the Tallangatta & District Football League, but was refused by the Ovens and King FL board, so the Beechworth Football Club took the appeal to Victoria Country Football League and won the appeal to join the Tallangatta & District Football League in 2004.

With joining the T&DFNL, Beechworth had to choose a new nickname and new jumper style (Because Dederang-Mt Beauty were known as the Bombers) so after a vote, the Beechworth Football Club new nickname was the 'Bushrangers' and would wear Red and Royal Blue vertically striped jumpers.

In their first year of the T&DFNL, the Beechworth "Bushrangers" Football Club would make the finals, but would lose the Elimination Final to Dederang-Mt Beauty and finished 5th.

In 2005 the Bushrangers would only win 5 games (out of 16) and miss the finals for the first time in 10 years.

In 2006 The Beechworth Football Club amalgamated with the Netball club and is now known as Beechworth Football & Netball Club Inc.

In 2010 The Beechworth Football Club would taste the ultimate success, for this first time in the TDFL. Coached by Shaun Pritchard and captained by Brayden Carey, the Bushrangers defeated Yackandandah to win the Grand Final.

== Club incarnations ==
=== Hurdle Flat Football Club, 1885–88 ===
In 1885, a club at Hurdle Flat was established and played football against Stanley and Beechworth. The Hurdle Flat Wanderers later became known as the Beechworth Wanderers around 1889 and eventually merged with the Beechworth Football Club in 1892 and became known as the Beechworth District Wanderers FC and were often referred to in newspaper reports as the "District Wanderers".

=== Beechworth Mechanics Football Club, 1886 ===
The above club was formed in 1886 and played their first match against Hurdle Flat FC.

=== Beechworth Wanderers Football Club, 1889–1891, 1930–1935 ===
It appears the Beechworth Wanderers FC evolved from the Hurdle Flat Wanderers in 1889 and were based at Hurdle Flat, near Stanley. The Wanderers played regular matches against Yackandandah, Myrtleford, Beechworth and the Two Mile Rovers football club's. up until they merged with the Beechworth Football Club in early 1892.

Beechworth Wanderers FC reformed in 1930 and entered the Chiltern & District Football Association from 1930 to 1935 and wore a white jumper with a red V. The Wanderers and Beechworth FC would then merge again in early 1936 and entered the Ovens & King Football League as Beechworth United FC from 1936 to 1941 and adopted a black jumper with a red sash.

=== Beechworth Union Junior Football Club, 1891–1900 ===
This junior club was re-formed in April 1892 and adopted a blue and white coloured jumper with red socks. They became the Beechworth Junior FC in 1900, when they entered the O&MFL as inadvertently became a senior side again.

=== Beechworth Stars FC, 1938–39 ===
The Beechworth Stars FC (Beechworth Reserves side) were admitted into the Myrtleford - Bright FL in 1938 and played there in 1939, being runners up to Myrtleford Wanderers FC in both years. With the commencement of World War Two, this competition unfortunately did not reform in 1940.

== Uniform ==
1930–35	1936–2003

== Football competitions timeline ==
=== Seniors ===
- 1861: Club formed ?
- 1861 - 1875: ?
- 1876: Club re-formed.
- 1877: Beechworth FC becomes affiliated with the Victoria Football Association
- 1878 - 1891: Club active, but did not play in any official competitions, but did play “friendly” games against other local clubs most years.
- 1892: Beechworth FC & Beechworth Wanderers FC merged to form the Beechworth District Wanderers FC
- 1893 - 1898: Ovens & Murray Football League (Beechworth District Wanderers FC)
- 1899: Beechworth FC seniors in recess, but junior team active.
- 1900 - 1902: Ovens & Murray Football League
- 1903: Beechworth FC seniors in recess, but junior team active.
- 1904: North East Central Football Association
- 1905 - 1906: Ovens & King Football League
- 1907: Ovens & Murray Football League
- 1908 - 1914: Ovens & King Football League
- 1915: Ovens & Murray Football League
- 1916 - 1918: Club / League in recess due to WW1
- 1919 - 1923: Ovens & King Football League
- 1924 - 1928: Ovens & Murray Football League
- 1929 - 1935: Ovens & King Football League
- 1936 - 1941: Ovens & King Football League (Beechworth United FC)
- 1942 - 1944: Club / League in recess due to WW2
- 1945: Chiltern & District Football Association
- 1946 - 2003: Ovens & King Football League
- 2004 - 2019: Tallangatta & District Football League
- 2020: Club / League in recess due to COVID-19
- 2021 - Current: Tallangatta & District Football League

== Football Premierships ==
Seniors

- Ovens & Murray Football League (3)
  - 1893, 1894 1897
- Ovens & King Football League (14)
  - 1912, 1913, 1914, 1937, 1938, 1939, 1950, 1951, 1956, 1961, 1974, 1979, 2000, 2001
- Tallangatta & District Football League (1)
  - 2010

Reserves

- Chiltern & District Football Association (1)
  - 1932 (Beechworth Wanderers FC)
- Ovens & King Football League (10)
  - 1955, 1956, 1957, 1959, 1964, 1966, 1967, 1974, 1982, 1993

Thirds

- Ovens & King Football League (7)
  - 1980, 1983, 1986, 1989, 1990, 1994, 1995
- Tallangatta & District Football League (1)
  - 2007

Fourths

- Tallangatta & District Football League (2)
  - 2008, 2017

== Football Runners Up ==
Seniors

- Ovens & Murray Football League (3)
  - 1895, 1896, 1898
- Ovens & King Football League (16)
  - 1906, 1911, 1930, 1940, 1955, 1960, 1969, 1972, 1975, 1976, 1978, 1983, 1988, 1989, 1995, 2002.
- Tallangatta & District Football League (1)
  - 2009

Reserves

- Chiltern & District Football Association
  - 1933
- Myrtleford & Bright District Football League (2)
  - 1938, 1939 (Beechworth Stars FC)
- Ovens & King Football League (6)
  - 1965, 1977, 1979, 1983, 1986, 1988,

Thirds

- Ovens & King Football League (7)
  - 1978, 1979, 1982, 1984, 1985, 1987, 1991

== Netball Premierships ==
Ovens & King Football League
A. Grade Netbball

- Nil

B. Grade

- 1976

C. Grade

- 1985

Tallangatta & District Football League

- Beechworth NC have not won a T&DFNL premiership.

== League Best & Fairest Awards ==
Senior Football
Ovens & King Football League

- Hughes Medal
  - 1933 - Keith Parris
- Bryon Trophy
  - 1954 - Tim Lowe
- Tip Lean Trophy
  - 1956 - Tim Lowe
- Clyde Baker Medal
  - 1977 - John Rutten
  - 1979 - Con Madden
  - 1985 - Con Madden
  - 2001 - Anthony Mihaljevic
  - 2002 - John Allen

Tallangatta & District Football League

- George Barton Medal
  - 2010 - Brayden Carey
  - 2011 - Brenton Surrey
  - 2023 - Campbell Fendyk
  - 2024 - Campbell Fendyk

Reserves
Ovens & King Football League

  - 1961 - Vivian Stone
  - 1966 - Barry Pope
  - 1982 - William Grant
  - 1998 - Shaun French
  - 2000 - Troy McKendrick

Thirds
Ovens & King Football League

- Fred Jensen Medal
  - 1980 - Brett Norman
  - 1983 - John Ward# (# 1983 - Craig Williams, Greta FC won on a countback from Ward). Ward never received a retrospective medal like others have in the O&KFNL Baker Medal.
  - 1987 - Shaun French
  - 1995 - Daniel Cooper
  - 1997 - Terry Crossman

== VFL / AFL Players ==
The following footballers played with Beechworth, prior to playing senior football in the VFL/AFL, and / or drafted, with the year indicating their VFL/AFL debut.

- 1898 - John McDermott - South Melbourne
- 1898 - Harry Thompson - St. Kilda & Carlton
- 1898 - Albert Trim - South Melbourne & Carlton
- 1902 - Bill Fahey - South Melbourne
- 1906 - Ed Harrison - South Melbourne
- 1925 - Bill Keane - Geelong
- 1939 - Allan Mullenger - South Melbourne
- 1939 - Bobby Mullenger - South Melbourne
- 1944 - Russell Hill - Essendon
- 1948 - Fred Pemberton - St. Kilda
- 1950 - Mac Hill - Collingwood
- 1972 - Ivan Russell - Geelong

The following footballers were drafted or played senior VFL / AFL football prior to playing / coaching with the Beechworth FNC, with the year indicating their first year at Beechworth.

- 1913 - Tom Maguire - Geelong
- 1913 - Bill Marchbank - Fitzroy
- 1926 - Gladstone Power - South Melbourne
- 1932 - Frank Kelly - Collingwood
- 1933 - Keith Parris - Essendon
- 1936 - Jack Flanigan - Hawthorn
- 1939 - Steve Bravo - Hawthorn
- 1963 - Wally Russell - Richmond & Geelong
- 1966 - Frank Hogan - South Melbourne
- 1998 - Mark Perkins - Collingwood
- 1999 - Michael Quirk - St. Kilda
- 2021 - Shaun Baxter - Footscray

== Senior Football Honourboard ==
Year	President	Secretary	Treasurer	Coach	Best & Fairest	Leading Goalkicker	Ladder Position
1876							
1877							
1878	W L Zincke	Mr Ashe	Mr Ashe				
1879	G Lyon	J Dobbyn	H Moore				
1880	G Lyon	E N Moore	T Drenen				
1881	G Lyon	E N Moore	J Ingram				
1882	G Lyon	A A Foster	J Ingram				
1883							
1884	N Law	D Greig	D Greig	J Ingram			
1885	J S Campbell	D Greig	T Brown	Mr Lawrence			
1886	Alfred A Billson	D Greig	T Brown				
1887	A A Billson	W H Channon	W Milne	R Page			
1888	A A Billson	J A McDonald	J A McDonald	R Page			
1889	Ferguson H Tuthill, MLA	J A McDonald	J A McDonald	Conlon			
1890							
1891							
1892	Dr F Deshon	R Stewart	R Stewart			G L Julius	
1893	Dr F Deshon	A Turner		J Shennan		J Buckley	O&MFL: 1st
1894	Dr. F Deshon	H J Wissenden				J Buckley	1st
1895	Dr. F Deshon	D O’Brien	A J Fyffe	A Geddes		J Buckley	2nd
1896	F Allen	H J Wissenden	A J Fyffe			F McDermott	2nd
1897	T Graham	J Dolphin	R M Stewart			F McDermott	1st
1898	F Allen		J Dolphin			F McDermott	2nd
1899							In recess
1900	J Lowe	H B L Smith	L Roadknight	G Dolphin			O&MFL: 3rd
1901	A A Billson	J Greer	M P Ryan				3rd
1902	J Lowe	J Greer	M P Ryan				5th
1903							In recess
1904							NECFA 3rd
1905	J Snowball	A Billson	A Turner				O&KFL
1906	H P Zwar	A Billson	A Turner		G Maloney		2nd
1907	H P Zwar	A Turner	A Billson		H Thompson		O&MFL
1908	H P Zwar	B Anderson	A Billson				O&KFL
1909	H P Zwar	H Walker	R Clune				
1910	C Prater	H Allen	A Snow			Miller	
1911	C Prater	H Walker			H Walker		2nd
1912	A Anderson	B Woodhead		H Walker	E Youlden		1st
1913	A Anderson	B Woodhead		H Walker	A Turner		1st
1914	W Coughlan	H Nicholls	H Nicholls	B Marchbank	W Dunn		1st
1915	W Coughlan	B Woodhead		W Marchbank			O&MFL
1916-18							In recess WW2
1919	W Coughlan	B Woodhead					O&KFL
1920	W Coughlan	B Woodhead		A Kennedy			
1921	J Scott	C Reynolds					
1922	G Collier	J O'Brien	R Luxon				
1923	L Sambell	Wm Ryan	R Tymms				
1924	L Sambell	A Turner	R Tymms				O&MFL:8th
1925	L Sambell	R O'Brien	R Tymms	H Matson			
1926	L Sambell		A Callender	Gladstone Power			
1927	L Sambell	T Flanigan	R Tymms	R Rankin			
1928	L Sambell	T Flanigan	R Tymms	F Sheahan			
1929	L Sambell	T Flanigan	L Gilchrist	F Sheahan			O&KFL:4th
1930	L Sambell	L Gilchrist	R Tymms	F Sheahan			2nd
1931	L Sambell	R McNamara	R Tymms	F Sheahan		R McNamara 39	5th
1932	L Sambell	R McNamara	W Brady	Frank Kelly		R McNamara 38	3rd
1933	L Sambell	R McNamara	W Brady	Keith Parris	K Parris		
1934	L Sambell	C Reynolds	W Brady	A Nankervis		H Johnstone	
1935	L Sambell	J Fisher	C Alderdice	A Donnelly		H Johnstone 35	
1936	P Taylor	L McKelson	C Alderdice	Jack Flanigan		A Brooks 38	
1937	J Keefe	L McKelson	C Alderdice	J Flanigan		H Johnstone 40	1st
1938	J Keefe	L McKelson	C Alderdice	D Haig	Bobby Mullenger	Bobby Mullenger	1st
1939	J Keefe	L McKelson	C Alderdice	E Guppy	J Smith	S Londrigan 20**	
1940	J Keefe	J Hill	C Alderdice	E Guppy		S Londrigan	2nd
1941	P Taylor	R Gladstone	C Alderdice	F Beatson		E Huggins	5th
1942-44							In recess. WW2
1945	P Taylor	E Moss	E Moss	F Beatson			Chiltern & DFL:4th
1946	G Newth	E Moss	E Moss	F Beatson/E Guppy	W Hicks		O&KFL: 4th
1947	W Werry	E Moss	E Moss	F Beatson	J "Mac" Hill &	W Gracie	6th
					E.D. Huggins		
1948	W Werry	J Pemberton	J Pemberton	E Guppy	J Surrey		4th
1949	T Parkinson	Wm Grace		E Guppy	R H Sims	E Huggins	3rd
1950	T Parkinson	E Guppy		J Reilly/E Guppy	J Surrey	W Pemberton	1st
1951	T Parkinson	J Hayes	J Hayes	J Reilly	E Huggins	M Ryan	1st
1952	R Smith	R McInness	L Powell	E Guppy/J Hayes	M Carey	E Huggins	3rd
1953	M Leembruggen	M Carey	L Powell	C Lincoln	P Westwick	S Gilchrist 17	3rd
1954	M Leembruggen	M Carey	L Powell	T Lowe	T Lowe*	T Lowe 24	3rd
1955	M Leembruggen/W Robinson	W Edgar	L Powell	T Lowe	T Lowe	T Lowe 43	3rd
1956	W Forrest	W Edgar	L Powell	T Lowe	R Greening	T. Lowe/P. Westwick 29	1st
1957	W Forrest	K Pini	L Powell	T Lowe	N Jessup	A. Chambeyron 19	
1958	W Forrest	K Pini	L Powell	B McComb	D McLaughlin	B McComb 59**	5th
1959	W Forrest	D Craig	L Powell	W Comensoli	K Jessup	A Comensoli 45	3rd
1960	W Forrest	D Zwar	L Powell	W Comensoli	W Comensoli	A Comensoli 36	2nd
1961	W Forrest	D Zwar	L Powell	W Comensoli	W Comensoli	A Comensoli 40	1st
1962	W Forrest	D Zwar	L Powell	W Comensoli	W Comensoli	R Whitehead 56	4th
1963	W Forrest	J Lagoon	L Powell	W Comensoli	R Burridge	A Comensoli 48	4th
1964	W Forrest	J Lagoon	L Powell	D Irwin	B Pritchard	D. Irwin 34	5th
1965	W Forrest	J Lagoon	L Powell	Wally Russell	D Carey	B McDonald 63**	5th
1966	W Forrest	J Lagoon	L Powell	R Bartel/F Hogan	A Robinson	T Bartel 47	5th
1967	W Forrest	F Jensen	F Jensen	R Bartel	A Jarvis	T Bartel 27	3rd
1968	F Jensen	G Beel	L Powell	R Bartel	R Burridge	R McWaters 73	5th
1969	F Jensen	G Beel	L Powell	R Burridge	R 'Bob' McWaters	R McWaters 112**	2nd
1970	F Jensen	G Beel	L Powell	R Burridge	R Forrest	R McWaters 62	5th
1971	H C Lucas	R Lucas	L Powell	V Jessup	R Forrest	R McWaters 90	5th
1972	H C Lucas	R Lucas	L Powell	M Brenia	S McGuffie	R McWaters 111**	2nd
1973	H C Lucas	R Lucas	L Powell	M Brenia	J Grainger	G Hill 92**	6th
1974	F Jensen	P Carey	L Powell	M Brenia	L Gilchrist	G Hill 115**	1st
1975	F Jensen	P Carey	L Powell	D Cooper	R Warner	G Hill 110**	2nd
1976	F Jensen	B Jessup	L Powell	D Cooper	G Calder	G Hill/L Gilchrist 42	2nd
1977	F Jensen	E Kelly	L Powell	R Forrest	J Rutten	G Hill 55	4th
1978	G V Schulitz	B Jessup	L Powell	R Forrest	I Harrison	G Hill 51	2nd
1979	G V Schulitz	B Jessup	L Powell	R Forrest	L Gilchrist	G Hill 40	1st
1980	G V Schulitz	G Lockwood	L Powell	R Forrest	I Harrison	G Hill 39	3rd
1981	R McWaters	G Lockwood	L Powell	T Leahy	P Brock	P Brock 28	4th
1982	R McWaters	G Lockwood	L Powell	R Steer	G Cooper	N Whitehead 85	7th
1983	W B Forrest	P Carey	L Powell	J Head	I Harrison	G Hill 110	2nd
1984	W B Forrest	P Carey	L Powell	J Head	R Zane	G Hill 42	6th
1985	W B Forrest	R McWaters	L Powell	J Head	C Madden	G Hill 110**	3rd
1986	T White	R McWaters	L Powell	J Ramsdale	M Jessup	G Hill 44	4th
1987	T White	R McWaters	L Powell	J Ramsdale	J Ramsdale	T Wallace 55	5th
1988	B Jessup	R McWaters	L Powell	I Wales	I Wales	F Carey 37	2nd
1989	B Jessup	R McWaters	L Powell	I Wales	D Stephenson	T Wallace 89**	2nd
1990	Barry Jessup	Robert (Bob) McWaters	Les 'Sandy' Powell	Robert (Bob) McWaters	Robert Zane	Brett Bullivant 35	4th
1991	Barry Jessup	Robert (Bob) McWaters	Les 'Sandy' Powell	Robert (Bob) McWaters	Greg Delmenico	Adam Johnstone 45	6th
1992	Barry Jessup	Robert (Bob) McWaters	Les 'Sandy' Powell	Phil Hibberson	Greg Delmenico	Darren Bate 53	6th
1993	Barry Jessup	Robert (Bob) McWaters	Les 'Sandy' Powell	Phil Hibberson	Robbie Clapp	Brett McKenna 59	3rd
1994	Barry Jessup	Robert (Bob) McWaters	Les 'Sandy' Powell	Phil Hibberson	Robbie Clapp	Darren Bate 34	8th
1995	Darren English	Steven Jory	Les 'Sandy' Powell	Brendan Breen	Anthony Milhaljevic	Brett Bouker 49	2nd
1996	Brendan Halliday	G Byrne	G Bullivant/S May	Greg Newbold	David Dineen	Darren Bate 45	11th
1997	Graeme Pritchard	Brendan Halliday	George Fendyk	Greg Newbold	Anthony Milhaljevic	Darren Bate 71	7th
1998	Graeme Pritchard	Brendan Halliday	George Fendyk	Mark Perkins	Anthony Milhaljevic	Darren Bate 100**	7th
1999	Graeme Pritchard	Brendan Halliday	Jerry Jokinen	Mark Perkins	Anthony Milhaljevic	Darren Bate 67	3rd
2000	Barry Pope	Brendan Halliday	Jerry Jokinen	Michael Quirk	Mal Boyd	Darren Bate 79**	1st
2001	Barry Pope	Brendan Halliday	Julie Witherow	Michael Quirk	Brad McPherson	Darren Bate 117**	1st
2002	Neil Johnstone/Glen Collins	Brendan Halliday	Mrs Doyna Collins	Michael Quirk	Brendan Breen	Darren Bate 97**	2nd
2003	Glen Collins	Cheryl Bartold		Brendan Breen	Shane Leary	Darren Bate	4th
2004	Glen Collins	Cheryl Bartold		Brendan Breen	John Allen	Tiarnan Halliday	T&DFNL:5th
2005	Jerry Jokinen	Cheryl Bartold		Darren Perry	Brenton Surrey	Darren Perry	7th
2006	Jerry Jokinen	Cheryl Bartold		Luke Brock	John Allen	John Allen	6th
2007	Jerry Jokinen	Cheryl Bartold		Ian Romeril	Michael Voight	John Allen	6th
2008	Sean Cartledge	Cheryl Bartold		Ian Romeril	Shaun Pritchard	John Allen	7th
2009	Sean Cartledge	Cheryl Bartold		Shaun Pritchard	Brenton Surrey	Tiarnan Halliday 72**	2nd:17/5
2010	Adam Fendyk	Cheryl Bartold		Shaun Pritchard	Brayden Carey	Nick Dillon 47	1st: 17/3
2011	Adam Fendyk	Cheryl Bartold		Shaun Pritchard	Brenton Surrey	Tiarnan Halliday 39	7th:8/10
2012	Adam Fendyk	Cheryl Bartold		N Dillon/B Surrey	Brenton Surrey	Dylan Pritchard 37	10th:4/14
2013	Brett Lacey	Cheryl Bartold		Brenton Surrey	Brenton Surrey	Charles Sugars 21	12th:1/17
2014	Brett Lacey	Cheryl Bartold		B Surrey/G Pritchard	Nick Cibiras	Dylan Pritchard 54	10th:4/14
2015	Steven Collins	Cheryl Bartold		Nick Barnes	Kayde Surrey	Dylan Pritchard 56	6th:10/8
2016	Scott Amery	Cheryl Bartold		Nick Barnes	Lee Dale	Dayne Carey 32	9th:7/11
2017	Philip Surrey	Cheryl Bartold		Nick Barnes	Kayde Surrey	Jay Dale 47	9th:6/11
2018	John Thistleton	Cheryl Bartold		Nick Barnes	Kayde Surrey	J Dale/D Pritchard 36	8th:8/11
2019	John Thistleton	Cheryl Bartold		J Dale/B Surrey	Kayde Surrey	Dylan Pritchard 42	9th:7/11
2020	Adam Fendyk		John Sheehan	J Dale/B Surrey			In recess, COVID-19
2021	Adam Fendyk		John Sheehan	S Baxter/B Surrey	Kayde Surrey	Campbell Fendyk 20	11th: 1/10
2022	Adam Fendyk		John Sheehan	T Cartledge/B Carey	Campbell Fendyk	Dayne Carey 43	3rd: 16/5
2023	Adam Fendyk	Simone Sockett	Fiona Stringer	T Cartledge/B Carey	Campbell Fendyk *	Lachlan Armstrong 72	4th: 14/6
2024	Adam Fendyk	Simone Sockett	Fiona Stringer	Tommy Cartledge	Deegan Dolny	Connor Stone 45	4th: 15/5
2025	Emma Carey/Daniel Cooper	Simone Sockett	Fiona Stringer	Jack Neil	Tommy Cartledge	Lachlan Armstrong 30	5th: 11/7
2026	Emma Carey/Daniel Cooper	Simone Sockett	Fiona Stringer	Jack Neil	Kayde Surrey	Lachlan Armstrong 16	7th: 7/11

'**' Denotes league leading goalkicker '*' Denotes league best and fairest in league and club
