= Russell Hill (footballer) =

Australian rules footballer

Personal information
- Full name: Russell Paul Hill
- Born: 9 March 1920; Stanley, Victoria
- Died: 19 November 1987 (aged 67); Mornington, Victoria
- Original team: Beechworth
- Height: 179 cm (5 ft 10 in)
- Weight: 82 kg (181 lb)
- Position: Defender

Playing career^{1}
Years	Club	Games (Goals)
1944, 1946–47	Essendon	14 (1)
- ^{1} Playing statistics correct to the end of 1947.

Russell Paul Hill (9 March 1920 – 19 November 1987) was an Australian rules footballer who played with Essendon in the Victorian Football League (VFL). He played in Essendon's semi final team in 1946, but was dropped for the Grand Final, which Essendon won.

Hill originally played with the Beechworth Stars FC in the Bright / Myrtlford Football League, before playing with Beechworth in the Ovens & King Football League.

He served in the Royal Australian Air Force during the later part of World War II.

Hill made his VFL debut in round 16, 1944 against Geelong at full forward, kicking one goal in their winning side.

Hill also played a brilliant game in Point Cook's losing 1944 RAAF grand final side against Laverton in front of a crowd of 10,000 spectators at the Fitzroy Cricket Ground.

Hill played in Essendon's 1946 second semi final replay side, but missed selection in the 1946 VFL grand final team and was listed as an emergency.

Older brother of former Collingwood footballer, Mac Hill.
