= Albert Trim =

Australian rules footballer

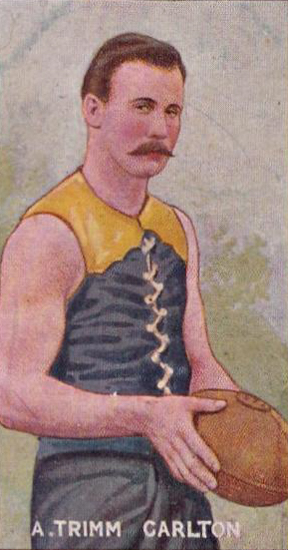
- Cigarette card of Trim in 1906

Personal information
- Full name: Albert Trim
- Born: 6 October 1875; Beechworth, Victoria
- Died: 11 July 1954 (aged 78); Subiaco, Western Australia
- Original team: Beechworth
- Position: Defender

Playing career^{1}
Years	Club	Games (Goals)
1898–1901	South Melbourne	65 (0)
1903–04	Carlton	36 (0)
Total		101 (0)
- ^{1} Playing statistics correct to the end of 1904.

Career highlights
- South Melbourne captain: 1901

Albert Trim (6 October 1875 – 11 July 1954) was an Australian rules footballer who played with South Melbourne and Carlton in the Victorian Football League (VFL).

== Football ==
A defender from Beechworth, Trim played in Beechworth's 1897 Ovens & Murray Football League premiership side.

Trim played in South Melbourne's losing 1899 VFL Grand Final team and captained his club for the 1901 season. He spent his final two league seasons at Carlton and appeared in another losing Grand Final in 1904. During 1899, 1903 and 1904, Trim represented the VFL at interstate football.

In 1905 he moved to Western Australia and played for South Fremantle. He was elected captain during the season and held the position until the end of 1906.

== Death ==
He died in Western Australia in July 1954.

== See also ==
- The Footballers' Alphabet
