= Ed Harrison (footballer) =

Australian rules footballer

Personal information
- Full name: Edward Harrison
- Born: 26 June 1884; Bright, Victoria
- Died: 13 March 1917 (aged 32); Étaples, France
- Original team: Beechworth

Playing career^{1}
Years	Club	Games (Goals)
1906, 08–09	South Melbourne	7 (0)
- ^{1} Playing statistics correct to the end of 1909.

Edward "Toiler" Harrison (26 June 1884 – 13 March 1917) was an Australian rules footballer who played with South Melbourne in the Victorian Football League. Serving as a policeman during his playing days, he was killed in World War I.

== See also ==
- List of Victorian Football League players who died on active service

== Sources ==
- Holmesby, Russell & Main, Jim (2007). The Encyclopedia of AFL Footballers. 7th ed. Melbourne: Bas Publishing.
- Ed Harrison's playing statistics from AFL Tables
