= Strathbogie, Victoria =

Strathbogie
- Town
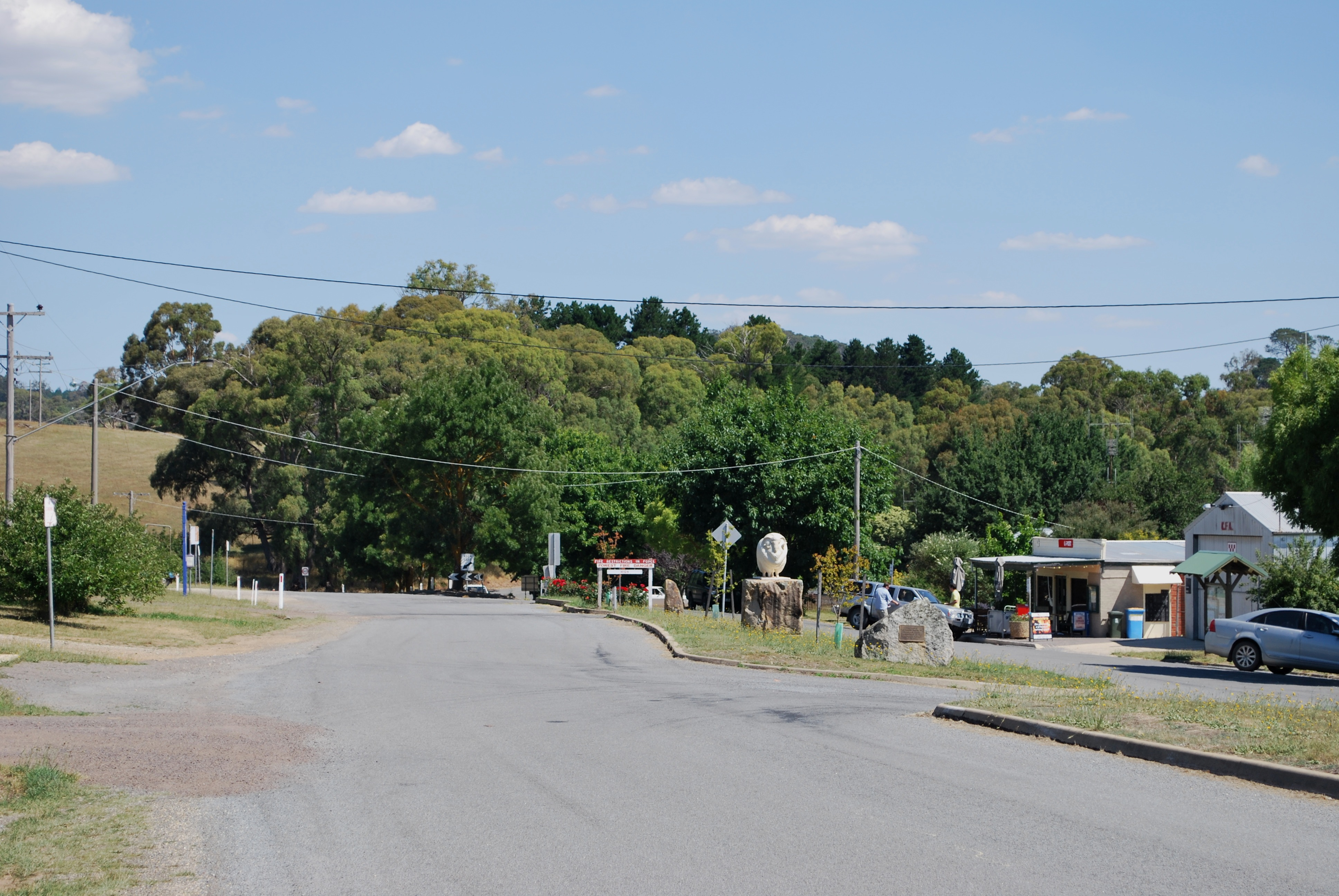
- Main street of Strathbogie

- Interactive map of Strathbogie
- Coordinates: 36°51′S 145°44′E
- Country: Australia
- State: Victoria
- Region: Hume
- LGA: Shire of Strathbogie
- Location: 187 km (116 mi) N of Melbourne; 55 km (34 mi) S of Benalla; 31 km (19 mi) SE of Euroa

Government
  - State electorate: Euroa
  - Federal division: Indi
- Elevation: 502 m (1,647 ft)

Population
  - Total: 304 (2016 census)
- Postcode: 3666
- Mean max temp: 18.5 °C (65.3 °F)
- Mean min temp: 6.1 °C (43.0 °F)
- Annual rainfall: 970.7 mm (38.22 in)

Strathbogie is a town in central Victoria, Australia. It is in the Shire of Strathbogie local government area. At the 2016 census, Strathbogie and the surrounding area had a population of 304.

== History ==
The Post Office opened on 10 July 1878.

Strathbogie is located in the Strathbogie Ranges. Mount Wombat (799 metres), which includes a floral and fauna reserve, is 4.6 km. to the north-west.

Town facilities include a general store/ cafe, war memorial and recreation reserve.

== Sports & Recreation ==
Golfers play at the course of the Strathbogie Golf Club on Armstrong Avenue.

=== Strathbogie Football Club ===
The Strathbogie Football Club appears to have played its first match of Australian Rules football in 1893 against Gooram, prior to entering a team in the Euroa District Football Association in 1905.

The Strathbogie North Football Club was formed in May 1895 and used to play matches against Strathbogie FC.

The Strathbogie FC then played in the following football competitions -

- 1893 - 1904: Played social matches intermittently against other local sides
- 1905 - 1908: Euroa District Football Association
- 1912 - 1913: Euroa District Football Association
- 1919 - Euroa District Football Association
- 1921 - Euroa District Football Association
- 1923 - 1926: Euroa District Football Association
- 1928 - 1935: Euroa District Football Association
- 1950 - 1954: Hume Highway Football League
- 1955 - 1961: Waranga North East Football Association
- 1962 - 1986: Benalla & District Football League
- 1987: Disbanded

Premierships

- Euroa District Football Association
  - 1912 - Strathbogie: 5.14 - 44 d Gooram: 3.5 - 23
  - 1939 - Strathbogie: 10.21 - 81 d Miepoll: 7.15 - 57
- Hume Highway Football League
  - 1950 - Strathbogie: 11.7 - 73 d Broadford 2nds: 8.13 - 61
  - 1951 - Strathbogie: 13.15 - 91 d Longwood: 6.15 - 51
  - 1952 - Strathbogie: 12.21 - 91 d Longwood: 9.13 - 67
  - 1954 - Strathbogie: defeated Longwood:
- Benalla & District Football League
  - 1983: Strathbogie: 8.10 - 58 d Bonnie Doon: 6.12 - 48

Runners Up

- Euroa District Football Association
  - 1925 - Baddaginnie: 6.16 - 52 d Strathbogie: 6.9 - 45
  - 1937 - Miepoll d Strathbogie
  - 1949 - Violet Town: 13.11 - 89 d Strathbogie: 5.6 - 36
- Hume Highway Football League
  - 1954 - Longwood: 12.4 - 76 d Strathbogie: 8.9 - 57
- Waranga North East Football Association
  - 1957 - Bonnie Doon: 10.12 - 72 d Strathbogie: 4.8 - 32

== Climate ==
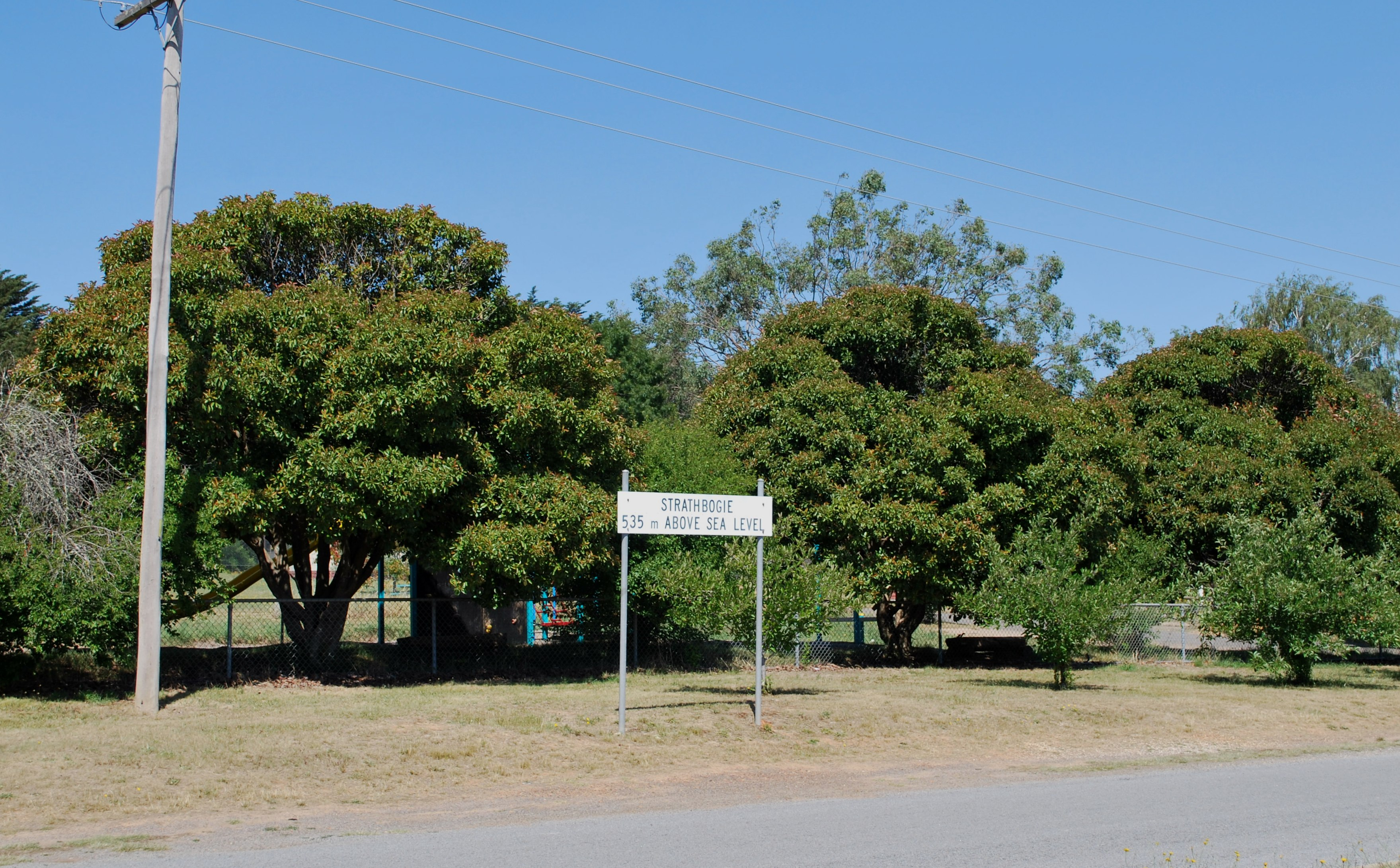
Strathbogie Elevation Sign

Strathbogie has warm, dry summers, though which are frequently interrupted by cold fronts on account of its proximity to the Southern Ocean (typical of central Victoria); summer maximum temperatures have been as low as 9.7 °C (49.5 °F) on 1 December 2019, and on 3 February 2005 the maximum did not exceed 10.5 °C (50.9 °F).

A pronounced autumnal lag is noted (March being almost as warm as December), and the winters are cold and rainy with many occurrences of snow. It has a 'Mediterranean' rainfall pattern, with nearly thrice the rainfall in winter than in high summer.

Climate data for Strathbogie (1974–2024, rainfall to 1902); 501 m AMSL; 36.85° S, 145.73° E
Month	Jan	Feb	Mar	Apr	May	Jun	Jul	Aug	Sep	Oct	Nov	Dec	Year
Record high °C (°F)	42.0 (107.6)	42.0 (107.6)	36.3 (97.3)	32.5 (90.5)	23.5 (74.3)	19.1 (66.4)	18.5 (65.3)	22.0 (71.6)	26.8 (80.2)	31.0 (87.8)	37.2 (99.0)	39.1 (102.4)	42.0 (107.6)
Mean daily maximum °C (°F)	27.5 (81.5)	27.3 (81.1)	24.0 (75.2)	18.9 (66.0)	14.4 (57.9)	11.2 (52.2)	10.2 (50.4)	11.5 (52.7)	14.3 (57.7)	18.0 (64.4)	21.6 (70.9)	24.8 (76.6)	18.6 (65.6)
Mean daily minimum °C (°F)	11.7 (53.1)	11.6 (52.9)	9.2 (48.6)	5.7 (42.3)	3.6 (38.5)	2.0 (35.6)	1.8 (35.2)	2.3 (36.1)	3.7 (38.7)	5.3 (41.5)	7.6 (45.7)	9.4 (48.9)	6.2 (43.1)
Record low °C (°F)	0.0 (32.0)	1.2 (34.2)	−0.5 (31.1)	−3.6 (25.5)	−5.7 (21.7)	−7.2 (19.0)	−8.0 (17.6)	−6.0 (21.2)	−5.5 (22.1)	−3.0 (26.6)	−3.0 (26.6)	−1.0 (30.2)	−8.0 (17.6)
Average precipitation mm (inches)	49.1 (1.93)	43.5 (1.71)	57.0 (2.24)	66.4 (2.61)	95.0 (3.74)	113.5 (4.47)	121.6 (4.79)	114.9 (4.52)	94.0 (3.70)	85.4 (3.36)	64.0 (2.52)	58.0 (2.28)	962.6 (37.90)
Average precipitation days (≥ 0.2 mm)	5.3	4.6	5.6	7.2	11.4	13.2	15.2	14.5	12.1	10.5	8.2	6.5	114.3
Average afternoon relative humidity (%)	40	39	45	54	67	74	75	69	63	57	49	42	56
Source: Australian Bureau of Meteorology; Strathbogie
