= Wally Russell =

Australian rules footballer

Personal information
- Full name: Walter Ivan Russell
- Born: 25 March 1923; Bacchus Marsh, Victoria
- Died: 4 March 1981 (aged 57); Clifton Springs, Victoria
- Original team: Bacchus Marsh
- Height: 178 cm (5 ft 10 in)
- Weight: 80 kg (176 lb)
- Position: Forward

Playing career^{1}
Years	Club	Games (Goals)
1942–43, 1945–48	Richmond	33 (11)
1948–49	Geelong	25 (19)
Total		58 (30)
- ^{1} Playing statistics correct to the end of 1949.

Wally Russell (25 March 1923 – 4 March 1981) was recruited from Bacchus Marsh where he played in the club's 1940 Bacchus Marsh & Melton Football Association premiership and also won the Association's best and fairest award, the Cyril C Jones Medal.

Russell was a former Australian rules footballer who played with Richmond and Geelong in the Victorian Football League (VFL). Russell was a member of 1946 Richmond Reserves premiership team.

Upon leaving Geelong, Russell was the St. Kilda Reserves Captain-Coach in 1950, playing 18 games, then went to BlackRock as Captain-Coach in 1951–52, then onto Carrum as Captain-Coach from 1953 to 1962, winning a premiership in 1959, winning the club Best & Fairest in 1958 and he also won a league Best & Fairest award too.

Russell was captain-coach of Beechworth Seniors in the Ovens & King Football League in 1965 and retired as a player, aged 44 in 1967, as captain-coach of Beechworth Reserves.

Father of former Geelong footballer, Ivan Russell.

He served in the R.A.A.F, for five years during World War 2. During his service, he was stationed in Canada.
