= Gladstone Power =

Australian rules footballer

Personal information
- Full name: Edward Gladstone Wills Power
- Born: 18 May 1898; Queenscliff, Victoria
- Died: 10 July 1950 (aged 52); Adelaide, South Australia
- Position: ruck

Playing career^{1}
| Years | Club | Games (Goals) |
| 1919–21 | South Melbourne | 23 (21) |
- ^{1} Playing statistics correct to the end of 1921.

Edward Gladstone Wills Power (18 May 1898 – 10 July 1950) was an Australian rules footballer who played with South Melbourne in the Victorian Football League (VFL).

== Family ==
The son of Edward Power, and Eveline Maud Power, née Wills, Edward Gladstone Wills Power was born at Queenscliff, Victoria on 18 May 1898.

He married Lillian Mavis Vorherr (1898-1964) in 1916.

== Football ==
=== Albert Park State School ===
Power was captain of the school football team when they won the Melbourne state school premiership.

=== Domain Junior Football Club ===
Power played with Domain Juniors prior to enlisting in the Australian Army in 1916 during World War One.

=== South Melbourne (VFL) ===
Power made his senior debut with South Melbourne in round 11 against Melbourne at the Lakeside Oval in July 1919, playing seven matches in 1919, 14 matches in 1920, then two matches in 1921, prior to playing with Hawthorn in the VFA.

=== Hawthorn (VFA) ===
On 30 June 1921, he was granted a clearance to the VFA club Hawthorn, He played in 6 matches in the remainder of the 1921 season.

=== Minyip ===
Power was captain-coach of Minyip Football Club from 1922 to 1925, winning a Wimmera Football League premiership in 1922. Power returned to Minyip as captain-coach of Minyip in 1927.

=== Beechworth Football Club ===
Power was captain-coach of Beechworth Football Club in 1926 in the Ovens & Murray Football League.

=== Stawell Football Club ===
Power was captain-coach of Stawell in the Wimmera Football League in 1932.

== Death ==
He died in Adelaide, South Australia on 10 July 1950.
