= Jim Marchbank =

Australian rules footballer (1878–1958)

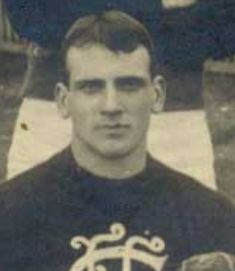
- Marchbank during his Carlton career

Personal information
- Full name: James Alexander Marchbank
- Born: 17 August 1878; Bairnsdale, Victoria
- Died: 6 January 1958 (aged 79); Tocumwal, New South Wales
- Original team: Woods Point
- Height: 188 cm (6 ft 2 in)
- Weight: 86 kg (190 lb)
- Position: Ruckman/Centre half forward

Playing career^{1}
Years	Club	Games (Goals)
1903–04, 1906–13	Carlton	115 (43)
- ^{1} Playing statistics correct to the end of 1913.

James Alexander Marchbank (17 August 1878 – 6 January 1958) was an Australian rules footballer who played for Carlton in the Victorian Football League (VFL).

== Family ==
Jim Marchbank was born James Alexander Hanson, the second son of James Trickett Hanson (a Danish immigrant) and Janet Scott. After his father's death in 1880, his mother married John William Marchbank and James inherited the Marchbank name. The family lived in Woods Point and worked in the timber industry.

== Football ==
Marchbank was already 24 when he came to Carlton but he soon established a place in the side as both a ruckman and centre half forward. He participated in Carlton's 1904 Grand Final loss and took a break from the sport in 1905 as the Woods Point recruit was struggling to adapt to life in Melbourne.

In 1906 he returned to the game and was a centre half forward in their premiership team that year as well as in 1908. He however missed the 1907 flag due to a suspension for striking in an encounter against South Melbourne late in the season. Marchbank played in further Grand Finals in 1909 and 1910 but finished on the losing team in both.

In 1915, Marchbank transferred to Hawthorn in the Victorian Football Association along with his half-brother Bill and made four appearances before the competition went into recess during World War I.

== Later life ==
Marchbank married Ellen Mary Roche in 1920 and worked in the timber industry until his death in 1958. His ashes were scattered on the Carlton Football Ground following his death.
