= Harry Thompson (Australian footballer) =

Australian rules footballer

Personal information
- Full name: Henry Tidyman Thompson
- Born: 1 December 1871; Beechworth, Victoria
- Died: 25 February 1957 (aged 85); Beaumaris, Victoria
- Original team: Beechworth

Playing career^{1}
Years	Club	Games (Goals)
1898	St Kilda	1 (0)
1899	Carlton	6 (8)
Total		7 (8)
- ^{1} Playing statistics correct to the end of 1899.

Henry Tidyman Thompson (1 December 1871 – 25 February 1957) was an Australian rules footballer who played with St Kilda and Carlton in the Victorian Football League (VFL).

Despite not making his Carlton debut until Round 12, in 1899 he was Carlton's leading goal kicker for the season with 8 goals.
