= Bill Marchbank =

Australian rules footballer

Personal information
- Full name: William Marchbank
- Born: 23 August 1887; Yarragon, Victoria
- Died: 19 July 1941 (aged 53); South Melbourne, Victoria
- Original team: Gaffney's Creek
- Height: 178 cm (5 ft 10 in)
- Weight: 87 kg (192 lb)

Playing career^{1}
Years	Club	Games (Goals)
1908	Carlton	3 (2)
1910–12	Fitzroy	22 (0)
Total		25 (2)
- ^{1} Playing statistics correct to the end of 1912.

William Marchbank (23 August 1887 – 19 July 1941) was an Australian rules footballer who played with Carlton and Fitzroy in the Victorian Football League (VFL).

The third child of James William Marchbank and Janet Scott, Bill Marchbank was a burly player who made three appearances for Carlton in 1908. After a year with North Melbourne in the Victorian Football Association (VFA), he joined Fitzroy where he played for three seasons.

In 1912, Marchbank was transferred to Beechworth Police Station and played with Beechworth in their 1912, 1913 and 1914 Ovens and King Football League premierships. He was captain of Beechworth in 1914 and again in 1915 when they played in the Ovens and Murray Football League.

In May 1915, Marchbank played on a permit with Hawthorn in the VFA alongside his half-brother Jim in a one off appearance before returning to Beechworth, then later enlisting to serve in World War I.

He married Emma Theresa McMaster in 1919 and served as a policeman for thirty years in various country and metropolitan locations until his death in 1941.
