= Bill Keane (footballer) =

Australian rules footballer, born 1900

Personal information
- Full name: Bill Keane
- Born: 18 May 1900
- Died: 21 March 1978 (aged 77)
- Height: 174 cm (5 ft 9 in)
- Weight: 70 kg (154 lb)

Playing career^{1}
Years	Club	Games (Goals)
1921–23	Geelong	29 (21)
- ^{1} Playing statistics correct to the end of 1923.

Bill Keane (18 May 1900 – 21 March 1978) was an Australian rules footballer who played with Geelong in the Victorian Football League (VFL).

Keane was appointed as playing coach of the Beechworth Football Club in the Ovens and Murray Football League in 1925.
