= Ivan Russell =

Australian rules footballer

Personal information
- Full name: Ivan Woodward Russell
- Born: 13 October 1952 (age 74)
- Original team: Beechworth
- Height: 178 cm (5 ft 10 in)
- Weight: 72 kg (159 lb)
- Position: centre

Playing career^{1}
Years	Club	Games (Goals)
1972 — 1973	Geelong	13 (2)
- ^{1} Playing statistics correct to the end of 1973.

Ivan Russell (born 13 October 1952) is a former Australian rules footballer who played for Geelong in the Victorian Football League (now known as the Australian Football League).

Russell, from Beechworth finished third in the 1968 Ovens & King Football League best and fairest award, the Clyde Baker Medal with 16 votes and was runner up in the 1969 Beechworth FC best and fairest.

Russell was best on ground in Beechworth’s losing 1969 Ovens & King Football League grand final side before signing with Geelong.

Russell later played 87 games with Geelong West Football Club, between 1975 and 1979, including their 1975 VFA Division One premiership.

Russell represented the VFA in 1979, in a convincing 156 point win against Queensland at Toorak Park.

Son of former Richmond and Geelong footballer, Wally Russell.
