= Year of the Dogs =

- Directed by: Michael Cordell; Stewart Young
- Produced by: Michael Cordell; Chris Hilton
- Starring: Alan Joyce; Tony Liberatore; Stephen Wallis; Terry Wallace; Chris Grant; Pat Hodgson; Jenny Hodgson; Peter Gordon
- Release date: 1997 (Australia)
- Running time: 86 minutes
- Country: Australia
- Language: English

Year of the Dogs is a 1997 documentary film detailing the 1996 season of the Footscray Football Club (now Western Bulldogs). Directed by Michael Cordell and Stewart Young, it stars Alan Joyce, Tony Liberatore, Stephen Wallis, Terry Wallace, Chris Grant, Pat Hodgson, Jenny Hodgson, and Peter Gordon.

== History ==
Filmed during the turbulent 1996 season where they finished second-last (15th) in the Australian Football League, the documentary follows the club and two dedicated fans, Pat and Jenny Hogson. The Bulldogs have a horror run of losses; senior coach Alan Joyce is sacked and replaced by Terry Wallace. The Dogs continue to struggle under this change in coaching administration, and continue to lose games.

Following a round 17 loss to Collingwood, Wallace infamously sprays the players during his post-match address, threatening to "spew up" if he saw the players get a pat on the back or told it was a good effort after a narrow loss following a dismal first quarter.

With a thin supporter base, the club is under numerous financial difficulties. The AFL CEO Ross Oakley is insistent that smaller AFL clubs must merge and the Dogs are under pressure to amalgamate with other clubs. After the Melbourne Hawks merger failure, the club's members vote strongly against any proposed merger. In the end a taskforce of businessmen and former players take over the club to ensure its future. The club president (Peter Gordon) resigns.

In addition to this, youngest player (Shaun Baxter) is fighting cancer and the club veteran, Stephen Wallis, knows his playing days are numbered.

For the last game for the season, Footscray play Essendon. Wanting to give their retiring player, Wallis a good send off, they play hard and put up a good performance, but end up losing narrowly in a closely played game.

For the next season, the Bulldogs are renamed the Western Bulldogs (a name they still carry to this day) in an effort to attract new members. The film showcases the club's battling spirit, and as an aside they escape a merger with Fitzroy (although Fitzroy were the club that did suffer that fate, being merged with Brisbane). After Wallace's performance as caretaker, he is signed on for the 1997 season.

== Miscellanea ==
- Year of the Dogs was filmed in 1996 during the course of the season and released theatrically in 1997, when the Bulldogs were having one of their best seasons and later narrowly missed making the Grand Final, losing to eventual premiers Adelaide by just two points.
- The film won an AFI award for "Best Editing in a Non-Feature Film" (Stewart Young).
- The film was replayed on 7mate the day before the 2016 AFL Grand Final, in which the Western Bulldogs would break a 62-year premiership drought by defeating the Sydney Swans by 22 points.

== Box office ==
Year of the Dogs grossed $199,191 at the box office in Australia.

== See also ==
- Aussie Rules the World
- Australian rules football
- 2016 AFL Grand Final
- Western Bulldogs
