= Thoona Football Club =

Australian rules football club in Victoria

Thoona

Names
- Full name: Thoona Football Club
- Nickname: Maroons

Club details
- Founded: 1885
- Colours
- Owners: Members
- Premierships: 1906, 1910, 1911, 1932,
- Ground: Thoona Sports Ground, Thoona

The Thoona Football Club was an Australian rules football club which competed in the numerous Associations and Leagues since 1885.

== History ==
The club was based in the North Eastern town of Thoona, Victoria, Australia.

Thoona was first officially formed on 25 April 1885 at Warrington's Commercial Hotel in Thoona.

Their first game was played against Benalla on 4 July 1885.

The Club colours were first red and white vertical strips with a green sash before changing to a maroon with a blue sash.

== Club Honourboard ==
Year	President	Vice President	Secretary	Treasurer	Captain	Competition	Titles
1885	J.J.Simcocks		W.A.B.Hart	W.A.B.Hart	Higgins		
1901	W.J.Tonkin	H.Lott, J.Richards	K.McIntosh		W.Ghent		
1902	W.J.Tonkin	J.B.Higgins & H.Lott	W.H.McBean	J.Richards	W.Ghent	Moria Shire Association	
1903	W.J.Tonkin	J.Higgins, A.Douglas & H.Lott	J.Rees	J.Rees		Moria Shire Association	
1904	W.J.Tonkin						Wooden Spoon
1906	W.J.Tonkin				S.Sargeant	Greta, Glenrowan & Winton Association	Premiers
1909	W.J.Tonkin	Sargeant, Justice, Cummings, R.Jones, Higgins, Goode	J.Conway	Mr. Anderson			
1910	W.J.Tonkin	W.J.Bergin			A.Johnson	Thoona-Goorambat Association	Premiers
1911	W.J.Bergin	W.J.Tonkin, R.Justice, R.Jones	A.Johnson	R.B.McLennan		Thoona Association	
1912						Moria Association	
1913						Glenrowan-Thoona Association	
1914	W.J.Tonkin		Platt	Hale		Devenish Association	
1919					Allen	Thoona-Greta Association	Runners Up
1929	W.J.Tonkin		A.Beckwith		A.Nicholson	Benalla & District League	
1930		A.Beckwith				Benalla & District League	
1931	G.M.Paulsen	G.W.Veall	A.Beckwith	A.Beckwith		Benalla & District League	
1932	A.L. Gerrard	F.J.Lee, P.Edmunds	A.Beckwith	A.Beckwith		Benalla & District League	Premiers
1933	P.Edmunds	H.Garratt, F.Conway	A.Beckwith	A.Beckwith		Tatong-Thoona Association	
1934	J.E.Bowdern		H.Garratt			Tatong-Thoona Association	
1935	J.E.Bowdern	A.Beckwith, A.L. Gerrard	H.Garratt	H.Garratt		Tatong-Thoona District League	
1936	J.E.Bowdern	A.Beckwith, A.Robertson	H.Garratt	H.Garratt		Tatong-Thoona District League	
1937	J.E.Bowdern				Jim Cleary	Tatong-Thoona District League	
1938	J.E.Bowdern				Jim Cleary	Tatong-Thoona District League	
1946	A.M.Irvine	Ross Lindham	Jack Sammon	A.W.Moore	F.McIntosh	Benalla District League	
1947	A.M.Irvine	R.Lindham, J.Jones, R.Beattie	J.Sammon	A.W.Moore		Benalla District League	
1948	A.M.Irvine	J.Jones	J.Sammon		Ross Lindham	Benalla District League	
1949	A.M.Irvine		J.Sammon			Benalla District League	
1950	A.M. Irvine		J.Sammon		Kevin Goonan	Benalla & District League	
1951	A.M.Irvine	J.Jones, R.Beatie	M.O'Hare	M.O'Hare	Kevin Goonan	Benalla District League	
1952	A.M.Irvine	J.Jones, R.Lindham	M.O'Hare	M.O'Hare	Barry Talochino	Benalla & District League	
1953	J.O'Donohue		M.O'Hare		Greg White	Benalla & District League	Club B&F Greg White
1954	J.O'Donohue	A.M.Irvine, J.Jones	P.M.Phillips	P.M.Phillips	I.Banfield	Benalla & District League	Wooden Spoon
