= Mac Hill =

Australian rules footballer

Personal information
- Full name: John McMahon "Mac" Hill
- Born: 22 March 1925; Beechworth, Victoria
- Died: 24 September 1995 (aged 70); Yarrawonga, Victoria
- Original teams: Beechworth, Wangaratta Rovers, Wangaratta
- Height: 173 cm (5 ft 8 in)
- Weight: 67 kg (148 lb)

Playing career^{1}
| Years | Club | Games (Goals) |
| 1950 | Collingwood | 2 (0) |
- ^{1} Playing statistics correct to the end of 1950.

John McMahon "Mac" Hill (22 March 1925 – 24 September 1995) was an Australian rules footballer who played with Collingwood in the Victorian Football League (VFL).

Hill played two senior matches with Collingwood in 1950.

Originally from Beechworth where he won their 1947 best and fairest award, he then played in an Ovens & King Football League premiership with Wangaratta Rovers FC in 1948 & then played in an Ovens & Murray Football League premiership with Wangaratta FC in 1949, before playing with Collingwood in 1950.

He returned to play with Wangaratta Rovers in the early 1950s, before coaching Glenrowan FC from 1954 to 1958, including their 1955 Benallla & District Football League premiership. He also won the Benallla & District Football League best & fairest Medal in 1957.

Hill served in the Royal Australian Air Force from 1943 to 1946.

Younger brother of former Essendon player, Russell Hill.
