= Fred Pemberton =

Australian rules footballer

Personal information
- Full name: Frederick Harold Pemberton
- Born: 22 May 1923; Beechworth
- Died: 10 December 2007 (aged 84); Canberra
- Original team: Beechworth
- Height: 191 cm (6 ft 3 in)
- Weight: 85 kg (187 lb)

Playing career^{1}
Years	Club	Games (Goals)
1948–50	St Kilda	24 (1)
- ^{1} Playing statistics correct to the end of 1950.

Frederick Harold Pemberton (22 May 1923 – 10 December 2007) was an Australian rules footballer who played with St Kilda in the Victorian Football League (VFL).

Prior to playing for St Kilda he served in World War II.

He later played with Eastern Suburbs and Western Suburbs in the Sydney AFL competition before playing for Glenelg in the SANFL in 1959.

He died in Canberra in 2007.
