= Shaun Baxter (Australian rules footballer) =

Australian rules footballer

Personal information
- Born: 2 October 1977 (age 49)
- Original team: Geelong Falcons (TAC Cup)
- Height: 188 cm (6 ft 2 in)
- Weight: 78 kg (172 lb)

Playing career
Years	Club	Games (Goals)
1995–1997	Western Bulldogs	0 (0)
1998	Geelong	0 (0)

Shaun Baxter (born 2 October 1977) is a former Australian rules footballer who was drafted by the Western Bulldogs.

Baxter was drafted to Footscray, as the Western Bulldogs were known then, as selection 49 in the 1994 AFL draft from the Geelong Falcons under-18s via Geelong & District Football League club, Bannockburn. His short AFL career was heavily hampered by a battle with nasopharyngeal carcinoma, type of cancer, that he survived. Baxter's fight with the illness was highlighted in the documentary Year of the Dogs during Footscray's turbulent 1996 season. His health contributed to Baxter never playing an AFL game. He later spent some time on Geelong Cats's supplementary list as a reserves player, before moving to Western Australia and playing for the East Perth Royals.

In 2008, he was a challenger on Australian Gladiators. He lost to Joe McKay.

In late 2020, the Beechworth Bushrangers appointed Baxter as non-playing coach.
