= Keith Parris =

Australian rules footballer (born 1905)

Personal information
- Full name: Joseph Keith Parris
- Born: 31 July 1905; Flemington, Victoria
- Died: 20 August 1991 (aged 86); Essendon, Victoria
- Original team: Camberwell

Playing career^{1}
Years	Club	Games (Goals)
1926	Camberwell (VFA)	10 (0)
1928–29	Essendon	16 (0)
1930	Prahran (VFA)	11 (2)
1931	Sandringham (VFA)	7 (0)
- ^{1} Playing statistics correct to the end of 1931.

Keith Parris (31 July 1905 – 20 August 1991) was an Australian rules footballer who played with Essendon in the Victorian Football League (VFL).

Parris coached Beechworth in the Ovens & King Football League in 1933 and won the O&KFL best and fairest medal in 1933 too.

Parris was captain-coach of Narrandera's 1934 South West Football League's premiership. Parris also shared the 1934 - SWDFL best and fairest award with two other footballer's.

Parris later served in the Australian Army during World War II.
