= John McDermott (Australian footballer) =

Australian rules footballer

Personal information
- Full name: John Charles McDermott
- Born: 17 May 1872; Yackandandah, Victoria
- Died: 5 February 1925 (aged 52); Yackandandah, Victoria
- Original team: Beechworth

Playing career^{1}
Years	Club	Games (Goals)
1898	South Melbourne	5 (3)
- ^{1} Playing statistics correct to the end of 1898.

John Charles McDermott (17 May 1872 – 5 February 1925) was an Australian rules footballer who played with South Melbourne in the Victorian Football League (VFL).

He died after falling from a ladder while erecting a veranda in Yackandandah.
