= Allan Mullenger =

Australian rules footballer

Personal information
- Full name: Allan John Mullenger
- Born: 12 April 1920; Fairfield, Victoria
- Died: 10 March 2002 (aged 81)
- Original team: Beechworth
- Height: 183 cm (6 ft 0 in)
- Weight: 82 kg (181 lb)
- Position: Forward

Playing career^{1}
Years	Club	Games (Goals)
1939–1944	South Melbourne	58 (29)
- ^{1} Playing statistics correct to the end of 1944.

Allan John Mullenger (12 April 1920 – 10 March 2002) was an Australian rules footballer who played for the South Melbourne Football Club in the Victorian Football League (VFL).

Mullenger also served in the Australian Army for four years during World War II.
