= Benalla & District Football League =

Benalla District league - football

Benalla & District Football Netball League
- Sport: Australian rules football
- First season: 1929
- No. of teams: 5
- Country: Australia
- Most recent champions: Bonnie Doon (7)
- Most titles: Goorambat (13)

The Benalla & District Football League was an Australian rules football competition based in the Benalla region of Victoria, Australia that existed under various names between 1929 and 2009.

== History ==
The B&DFL was formed in 1946 and superseded the former Tatong & Thoona Football Association after World War Two.

In 1968, Benalla All Blacks kicked 45.31 - 301 against Devenish: 1.0 - 6, with All Black's Gavin Cherry kicking 19 goals.

In round thirteen of 1981, Glenrowan: 46.18 - 294 defeated Longwood: 1.1 - 7, with Glenrowan's R Fitzgerald kicking 18 goals.

The Victorian Country Football League shut the competition down at the end of the 2009 season when the VCFL policy of leagues having a minimum of six clubs could not be met.

The five remaining clubs joined the following leagues during the 2009 post-season.

- Bonnie Doon: Ovens & King Football League
- Goorambat & District: Ovens & King Football League
- Longwood: Kyabram & District Football League
- Swanpool: Ovens & King Football League (went into recess in 2014)
- Tatong: Ovens & King Football League (went into recess in 2014)

== League Competition History ==
The football association commenced in 1929 and has changed its name several times during their 81 years:

- 1929-1931: Benalla District Football League
- 1932-1940: Tatong and Thoona Football Association
- 1941-1945: Recess - World War II
- 1946-2009: Benalla & District Football League

== Clubs ==
=== Final ===
Club	Colours	Nickname	Home Ground	Former League	Est.	Years in BDFL	Premierships		Fate
Club	Colours	Nickname	Home Ground	Former League	Est.	Years in BDFL	Total	Years	Fate
Bonnie Doon		Bulldogs	Bonnie Doon Recreation Reserve, Bonnie Doon	WNEFA	1885	1965-2009	7	1966, 1989, 1999, 2002, 2004, 2008, 2009	Moved to Ovens & King FNL following 2009 season
Goorambat		Bats	Goorambat Recreation Reserve, Goorambat	T&TFA	1893	1947-2009	13	1935, 1947, 1949, 1959, 1963, 1964, 1965, 1974, 1978, 1979, 2001, 2006, 2007	Moved to Ovens & King FNL following 2009 season
Longwood		Redlegs	Longwood Recreation Reserve, Longwood	HHFA	1888	1970-2009	3	1977, 1985, 2000	Moved to Kyabram District FNL following 2009 season
Swanpool	(1950s)(Post-1950s)	Swans	Albert Heaney Oval, Swanpool	M&SFA	1920s	1929-2009	5	1933, 1951, 1957, 1997, 1998	Moved to Ovens & King FNL following 2009 season
Tatong		Magpies	Tatong Recreation Reserve, Tatong	–	1920s	1929-2009	12	1934, 1960, 1961, 1962, 1972, 1973, 1975, 1984, 1988, 1994, 1995, 1996	Moved to Ovens & King FNL following 2009 season

=== Former ===
Club	Colours	Nickname	Home Ground	Former League	Est.	Years in BDFL	Premierships		Fate
Club	Colours	Nickname	Home Ground	Former League	Est.	Years in BDFL	Total	Years	Fate
Baddaginnie			HG Parker Memorial Reserve, Baddaginnie	EDFA		1931-1935	0	-	Folded
Benalla All Blacks		Panthers	Friendlies Oval, Benalla	CGVFL	1934	1934-40, 1953-80	11	1934, 1936, 1937, 1940, 1953, 1954, 1956, 1967, 1968, 1971, 1976	Played in Central Goulburn Valley FL in 1946. Moved to Tungamah FL in 1981
Benalla Rovers		Tigers	Benalla Showgrounds, Benalla	–	1976	1976-1989	1	1986	Folded after 1989 season
Benalla Seconds	(1929-31)(1946)	Demons	Benalla Showgrounds, Benalla	–	1871	1929-1931, 1946	3	1930, 1931, 1946	Joined Euroa Line FA in 1932. Moved to Benalla Mulwala FL following 1931 season
Benalla Thirds		Demons	Benalla Showgrounds, Benalla	–	1871	1947-1952	0	-	Moved to Benalla Junior FL following 1952 season
Devenish (St James-Devenish United 1956-60)		Barbers	Devenish Recreation Reserve, Devenish	TFL	1884	1954-2006	2	2003, 2005	Folded
Dookie Collegians seconds		Students	Dookie College		1930s	1939-1971	1	1948	Left competition
Glenrowan		Kelly Tigers	Glenrowan Recreation Reserve, Glenrowan	EDFA	1919	1934-1938, 1946-1960, 1963-1991	5	1955, 1969, 1970, 1980, 1981	Recess from 1939-45. Played merged with Thoona in 1961-62. Moved to Ovens & King FNL following 1991 season
Glenrowan-Thoona United				–	1961	1961-1962	0	-	De-merged following 1962 season
Greta		Blues	Greta Recreation Reserve, Hansonville	KVFA	1901	1935-1940	0	-	Moved to Ovens & King FNL in 1945
Molyullah			Molyullah Recreation Reserve, Molyullah		1920s	1933-1934	0	-	Folded
North Wangaratta		Hawks	North Wangaratta Sports Reserve, North Wangaratta	TFL	1892	1954–1960	1	1958	Moved to Ovens & King FNL following 1960 season
Samaria West						1932	1	1932	Folded
Strathbogie			Strathbogie Recreation Reserve, Strathbogie	WNEFA	1900s	1962-1986	1	1983	Folded after 1986 season
Thoona		Maroons	Thoona Recreation Reserve, Thoona	G&TFA	1919	1931-1960, 1963-1967	0	-	Played merged with Glenrowan in 1961-62. Folded after 1967 season
Thornton-Eildon		Shinboners	Thornton Recreation Reserve, Thornton	YVMDFL	1949	1986-1994	3	1991, 1992, 1993	Moved to Tungamah FL following 1994 season
Tolmie		Snowmen	Tolmie Recreation Reserve, Tolmie	MHFA	1940s	1951-1970	1	1952	Folded after 1970 season
Violet Town	(1979)(1987)	Towners	Violet Town Recreation Reserve, Violet Town	EDFA	1880	1936-1940, 1978-1991	5	1938, 1939, 1982, 1987, 1990	Returned to Euroa DFA in 1944. Moved to Tungamah FL following 1991 season
Winton			Winton Recreation Reserve, Winton	G&TFA	1900s	1929-31, 1947-57	2	1929, 1950	In recess between 1932 & 1946. Folded after 1957 season

== Senior Football Premierships / Runner Up: 1929 to 2009 ==
Benalla District Football League.
(Nichols & Sullivan Jewellers Shield)

- 1929: Winton: 11.7 - 73 d Benalla: 10.5 - 65
- 1930: Benalla Juniors: 9.16 - 70 d Swanpool: 7.10 - 52
- 1931: Benalla Juniors: 10.14 - 74 d Swanpool: 5.6 - 36

Tatong / Thoona Football Association

- 1932: Samaria West 8.12 - 60 d Thoona 4.12 - 36
- 1933: Swanpool: 10.8 - 68 d Thoona: 7.13 - 55
- 1934: Benalla All Blacks: 6.6 - 42 d Tatong: 5.10 - 40 (1st G/Final) #
- 1934: Tatong: 12.15 - 87 d Glenrowan: 10.6 - 66 (2nd G/Final)
- 1935: Goorambat: 9.6 - 60 d Tatong: 4.10 - 34
- 1936: Benalla All Blacks: 12.24 - 96 d Violet Town: 10.12 - 72
- 1937: Benalla All Blacks: 13.9 - 87 d Violet Town: 10.14 - 74
- 1938: Violet Town: 17.15 - 117 d Benalla All Blacks: 12.11 - 83
- 1939: Violet Town: 12.15 - 87 d Tatong: 4.6 - 30
- 1940: Benalla All Blacks: 13.9 - 87* d Violet Town: 9.5 - 39
- 1941: Recess - World War II
- 1942: Recess - World War II
- 1943: Recess - World War II
- 1944: Recess - World War II
- 1945: Recess - World War II

Benalla & District Football League

- 1946: Benalla 2nds: 12.17.89 d Violet Town 12.11 - 83
- 1947: Goorambat: 8.7 - 55 d Swanpool: 7.7 - 49
- 1948: Dookie Collegians: 8.22 - 70 d Goorambat: 2.11 - 23
- 1949: Goorambat: 9.10 - 64 d Benalla 3rds: 8.6 - 54
- 1950: Winton: 6.14 - 50 d Goorambat: 6.9 - 45
- 1951: Swanpool: 12.4.76 defeated Winton 5.16.46.
- 1952: Tolmie: 7.10.52 defeated Tatong 7.8.50.
- 1953: Benalla All Blacks: 11.16 - 82 d Tatong: 7.13 - 55
- 1954: Benalla All Blacks: 12.14 - 86 d Glenrowan: 6.12 - 48
- 1955: Glenrowan: 14.9 - 93 d Swanpool: 9.16 - 70
- 1956: Benalla All Blacks: 13.10 - 88 d Glenrowan 11.6 - 72
- 1957: Swanpool: 9.9 - 63 d Glenrowan: 7.14 - 56
- 1958: North Wangaratta: 18.14 - 122 d Goorambat: 9.10 - 64
- 1959: Goorambat: 16.10 - 106 d Tatong: 8.9 - 57
- 1960: Tatong: 13.9.87 defeated North Wangaratta 10.8.68
- 1961: Tatong: 12.14.86 defeated Swanpool 8.13.61
- 1962: Tatong: 10.16.76 defeated Swanpool 10.15.75
- 1963: Goorambat: 6.8 - 44 d Swanpool: 5.13 - 43
- 1964: Goorambat: 10.7 - 67 d Strathbogie: 6.8 - 44
- 1965: Goorambat: 9.19 - 73 d Bonnie Doon: 10.4 - 64
- 1966: Bonnie Doon: 14.9 - 93 d Benalla All Blacks: 13.10 - 88
- 1967: Benalla All Blacks: 13.18 - 96 d Bonnie Doon: 11.9 - 75
- 1968: Benalla All Blacks: 13.16 - 94 d Glenrowan: 13.9 - 87
- 1969: Glenrowan: 13.14 - 92 d Benalla All Blacks: 11.9 - 75
- 1970: Glenrowan: 15.8 - 98 d Benalla All Blacks: 13.11 - 89
- 1971: Benalla All Blacks: 13.6 - 84 d Glenrowan: 11.4 - 70
- 1972: Tatong: 17.11 - 113 d Swanpool: 10.14 - 74
- 1973: Tatong: 12.13 - 85 d Longwood: 10.8 - 68
- 1974: Goorambat: 9.12 - 66 d Benalla All Blacks: 5.8 - 38
- 1975: Tatong: 15.16 - 106 d Bonnie Doon: 9.11 - 65
- 1976: Benalla All Blacks: 18.19 - 115 d Tatong: 9.7 - 61
- 1977: Longwood: 17.4 - 106 d Benalla All Blacks: 8.19 - 67
- 1978: Goorambat: 16.16 - 112 d Glenrowan: 16.11 - 107
- 1979: Goorambat: d Glenrowan:
- 1980: Glenrowan: 16.6 - 102 d Tatong: 15.7 - 97
- 1981: Glenrowan: 17.13 - 115 d Tatong: 14.11 - 95
- 1982: Violet Town: 13.10 - 88 d Bonnie Doon 10.13 - 73
- 1983: Strathbogie: 8.10 - 58 d Bonnie Doon: 6.12 - 48
- 1984: Tatong: 16.18 - 114 d Bonnie Doon: 6.15 - 51
- 1985: Longwood: 23.13 - 151 d Goorambat: 12.6 - 78
- 1986: Benalla Rovers: 16.11 - 107 d Longwood 11.14 - 80
- 1987: Violet Town: 14.16 - 100 d Tatong: 11.8 - 74
- 1988: Tatong: 21.7 - 133 d Bonnie Doon 13.7. - 85
- 1989: Bonnie Doon: 18.12 - 120 d Tatong: 10.14 - 74
- 1990: Violet Town: 22.14 - 146 d Thornton-Eildon Districts 9.16 - 70
- 1991: Thornton-Eildon: 19.9 - 123 d Violet Town: 6.10 - 46
- 1992: Thornton-Eildon: 14.10 - 94 d Bonnie Doon: 12.15 - 87
- 1993: Thornton-Eildon: 17.14 - 116 d Bonnie Doon: 12.8 - 80
- 1994: Tatong: 11.8 - 74 d Bonnie Doon: 10.12 - 72
- 1995: Tatong: 19.8 - 122 d Longwood 16.14 - 110
- 1996: Tatong: 24.10 - 154 d Swanpool: 16.12 - 108
- 1997: Swanpool: 19.26 - 140 d Bonnie Doon: 11.8 - 74
- 1998: Swanpool: 9.15 - 69 d Bonnie Doon: 8.12 - 60
- 1999: Bonnie Doon: 17.14 - 116 d Goorambat: 9.6 - 60
- 2000: Longwood: 18.12 - 120 d - Devenish: 10.5 - 65
- 2001: Goorambat: 10.13 - 73 d Bonnie Doon: 4.5 - 29
- 2002: Bonnie Doon: 12.18 - 90 d Longwood 13.8 - 86
- 2003: Devenish: 15.11 - 101 d Longwood: 12.10 - 82
- 2004: Bonnie Doon: 28.13 - 181 d Devenish: 11.8 - 74
- 2005: Devenish: 13.15 - 93 d Goorambat: 8.10 - 58
- 2006: Goorambat: 21.7 - 133 d Bonnie Doon: 15.7 - 97
- 2007: Goorambat: 19.10 - 124 d Bonnie Doon: 13.11 - 89
- 2008: Bonnie Doon: 10.17 - 77 d Goorambat: 11.6 - 72
- 2009: Bonnie Doon: 19.12 - 126 d Swanpool: 4.9 - 33

Notes

- In 1934, Benalla All Blacks won the first grand final, then Glenrowan FC protested against an unregistered player. Tatong then defeated Glenrowan in the 2nd grand final.
- In 1940 Benalla All Blacks were undefeated Premiers.

== Football Best & Fairest Awards ==
Tatong & Thoona Football Association

Year	B & F Winner	Club	Votes	Runner up	Club	Votes
1932						
1933						
1934	Harry Billman	Glenrowan	7	Joe Askew &	Benalla All Blacks	4
				Arthur Hall	Benalla All Blacks	4
1935						
1936	J A Fisher	Tatong	3	R Reaper	Thoona	2 & 1/2
1937	Larry O'Brien	Glenrowan	14	J Byrnes	Benalla All Blacks	13
1938	Geoff Peacock &	Violet Town	11	Jim Cleary	Thoona	8
	Fred Wallis	Benalla All Blacks	11			
1939						
1940						

Benalla & District Football League
Seniors

Year	B & F Winner	Club	Votes	Runner up	Club	Votes
1947	Lewis James	Goorambat	7	A Hyland &	Benalla	5
	Lewis James	Goorambat		W Murphy	Tatong	5
1948	Jack Andrews &	Benalla				
	Dick Joyce &	Winton				
	Jack Saunders	Goorambat				
1949	Tom Dempsey &	Goorambat	3			
	Charles Tolliday	Swanpool	3			
1950	Lewis James	Goorambat				
1951	Ken Lakeman &	Winton				
	Erin Murray &	Swanpool				
	Athol Sims &	Tatong				
	Frank Saunders	Goorambat				
1952	Doug Probyn	Tolmie	27 & 1/2	R Symes	Tatong	27
1953	Charles Tolliday	Swanpool		Athol Sims	Tatong	
1954	C Brisbane	Tolmie	22	Don Matthews	Tatong	18
				Athol Sims	Tatong	18
1955						
1956						
1957	John “Mac” Hill	Glenrowan				
1958	Laurie O'Donnell	Benalla All Blacks				
1959						
1960	Kevin Allan	North Wangaratta	23	Barry Mathieson	Swanpool	20
1961	Neil Hanlon	Goorambat				
1962						
1963	Alan O'Brien	Glenrowan	26			
1964				Alan O’Brien	Glenrowan	21
1965						
1966	Neil Hanlon	Goorambat				
1967	Neil Hanlon	Goorambat	27	Gary Wilson	Tolmie	21
1968	Bryan Gibson	Thoona	24	Paul Hooper	Devenish	19
1969	Neville Smedley	Glenrowan	31	T Dale	Tolmie	18
1970	Nick Farrell	Goorambat	25	John Foley	Goorambat	16
1971	John Burns	Swanpool	32	R Houston	Longwood	25
1972	Merv Hubbard	Bonnie Doon	29	Wayne McIntyre	Goorambat	16
1973						
1974	Phil Newth	Swanpool	23	Malcom Larkin	Bonnie Doon	16
1975	John Burns	Benalla All Blacks	22	John Booth	Glenrowan	20
1976	David McCullough	Glenrowan				
1977	M Shiell	Benalla All Blacks	23	T Harding	Longwood	19
1978	Fred Malloy	Glenrowan	23			
1979	Geoff Payne	Bonnie Doon	23	R Vance	Violet Town	18
1980	David McCann	Devenish	21	V Edwards	Strathbogie	18
				Geoff Payne	Bonnie Doon	18
1981	David McCann	Devenish	34	Ian Lee	Goorambat	22
1982	Andrew Knowles	Violet Town	29	David McCann &	Devenish	21
				David Pallpratt &	Devenish	21
				Greg Withers &	Strathbogie	21
1983	Robert Lowe	Tatong	23	Brendan Purcell	Bonnie Doon	21
1984	Colin Tatterson	Violet Town	17	G. "Jedda" Walker &	Longwood	16
				Greg Withers	Strathbogie	16
1985	Glen Arndt	Bonnie Doon				
1986	Robert Johnson	Benalla Rovers	24	Ian Saunders	Goorambat	20
1987	Andrew Varcoe	Devenish	25	Craig Allchin &	Thornton Eildon	23
				Mark Metzner	Thornton Eildon	23
1988	Phil Job	Bonnie Doon	23	Gary Abley	Violet Town	21
1989	Andrew Varcoe	Devenish	23	Mick Grimes	Bonnie Doon	21
1990	Brett Halligan	Thorton Eildon	22	Gary Abley	Violet Town	22 (ineligible)
				Mark McGuire	Tatong	15
1991	Chris Pollard	Bonnie Doon	22	Gary Gerada	Violet Town	12
1992						
1993						
1994						
1995						
1996						
1997						
1998						
1999						
2000						
2001						
2002						
2003						
2004						
2005						
2006						
2007						
2008						
2009						
2010						Competition Folded

=== Leading Goal Kickers ===
Year	Player	H&A goals	Finals goals	Total Goals
1950	Noel Johnson (Winton)	46	8	54
1951	0	0	0	0
1952	0	0	0	0
1953	Pat Fitzgibbon (Benalla All Blacks)	75	10	85
1954	Pat Fitzgibbon (Benalla All Blacks)	88	10	98
1955	O'Brien (North Wagaratta)	57	3	60
1956	Pat Fitzgibbon (Benalla All Blacks)	93	11	104
1957	Pat Fitzgibbon (Benalla All Blacks)	57	0	57
1958	Pat Fitzgibbon (Benalla All Blacks)	108	2	110
1959	0	0	0	0
1960	0	0	0	0
1961	0	0	0	0
1962	K Weston (Tatong)	66	0	66
1963	Robert Ashton (Goorambat)	84	6	90
1964	Robert Ashton (Goorambat)	86	9	95
1965	Robert Ashton (Goorambat)	97	3	100
1966	Bob Burns (Benalla All Blacks)	88	4	92
1967	J Bear (Glenrowan)	69	3	72
1968	Gavin Cherry (Benalla All Blacks)	118	4	122
1969	Gavin Cherry (Benalla All Blacks)	114	4	118
1970	Gavin Cherry (Benalla All Blacks)	114	4	118
1971	D Robertson (Swanpool)	68	5	73
1972	L Withers (Longwood)	79	5	84
1973	M Withers (Longwood)	70	4	74
1974	G Joyce (Tatong)	57	3	60
1975	S Hales (Benalla All Blacks)	88	5	93
1976	Merv Sellars (Tatong)	92	12	104
1977	G Trickey (Benalla All Blacks)	76	2	78
1978	T Harding (Longwood)	52	2	54
1979	P Gipps (Strathbogies)	67	0	67
1980	G Payne (Bonnie Doon)	71	0	71
1981	R Fitzgerald (Glenrowan)	102	6	108
1982	Greg Withers (Strathbogies)	105	8	113
1983	Len Holden (Glenrowan)	86	5	91
1984	Stephen Judd (Tatong)	69	7	76
1985	P Murrell (Glenrowan)	93	0	93
1986	Brian Hogg (Benalla Rovers)	123	12	135
1987	Philip Job (Boonie Doon)	112	0	112
1988	Philip Job (Boonie Doon)	145	4	149
1989	Steve Rowe (TED)	91	8	99
1990	Chris Hayes (Violet Town)	114	14	128
1991	Rodney Webster (Tatong)	98	11	109
1992	Rodney Webster (Tatong)	109	0	109
1993	Steve Rowe (TED)	124	12	136
1994	Les Wallace (Tatong)	110	7	117
1995	Geoff Hill (Tatong)	103	8	111
1996	Geoff Hill (Tatong)	91	13	104
1997	John Byrnes (Longwood)	85	2	87
1998	B Groom (Longwood)	65	7	72
1999	Ben Vogelzang (Bonnie Doon)	117	18	135
2000	Leigh Pollard (Bonnie Doon)	78	3	81
2001	Peter Cox (Boonie Doon)	65	5	70
2002	Ben Vogelzang (Bonnie Doon)	111	0	111
2003	Ben Vogelzang (Bonnie Doon)	119	0	119
2004	Ben Vogelzang (Bonnie Doon)	71	20	91
2005	David Matheson (Devenish)	80	12	92
2006	Heath Martin (Bonnie Doon)	75	0	75
2007	Andrew Doxey (Goorambat)	86	16	102
2008	Brad Torney (Bonnie Doon)	62	0	62
2009	Tom Webster (Bonnie Doon)	64	0	64

Most individual goals in a match

- 28 - John Byrnes - (Longwood) v Goorambat, 1997.

== Senior Seasons ==
=== 2003 Season ===
Ladder	Wins	Losses	Draws	For	Agst	%	Pts	Final	Team	G	B	Pts	Team	G	B	Pts
Devenish	13	2	0	1646	888	185.36	52	1st Semi	Longwood	12	12	84	Tatong	7	14	56
Bonnie Doon	13	2	0	1823	989	184.33	52	2nd Semi	Devenish	12	16	88	Bonnie Doon	9	8	62
Longwood	8	7	0	1550	1233	125.71	32	Preliminary	Longwood	16	6	102	Bonnie Doon	15	11	101
Tatong	5	9	1	1142	1665	68.59	22	Grand Final	Devenish	15	11	101	Longwood	12	10	82
Goorambat	4	11	0	1065	1477	72.11	16									
Swanpool	1	13	1	954	1851	51.54	6									

=== 2004 Season ===
Ladder	Wins	Losses	Draws	For	Agst	%	Pts	Final	Team	G	B	Pts	Team	G	B	Pts
Bonnie Doon	14	1	0	2115	765	276.47	56	1st Semi	Tatong	20	11	131	Goorambat	11	11	77
Devenish	12	3	0	1624	994	163.38	48	2nd Semi	Bonnie Doon	18	12	120	Devenish	14	8	92
Tatong	7	8	0	1225	1216	100.74	28	Preliminary	Devenish	12	2	74	Tatong	10	12	72
Goorambat	6	9	0	1004	1261	79.62	24	Grand Final	Bonnie Doon	28	13	181	Devenish	11	8	74
Swanpool	5	10	0	866	1508	57.43	20									
Longwood	1	14	0	734	1824	40.24	4									

=== 2005 Season ===
Ladder	Wins	Losses	Draws	For	Agst	%	Pts	Final	Team	G	B	Pts	Team	G	B	Pts
Devenish	15	0	0	2340	701	333.81	60	1st Semi	Longwood	14	5	89	Bonnie Doon	13	10	88
Goorambat	11	4	0	1813	885	204.86	44	2nd Semi	Goorambat	15	10	100	Devenish	15	7	97
Bonnie Doon	8	7	0	1782	1202	148.25	32	Preliminary	Devenish	17	16	118	Longwood	10	10	70
Longwood	6	9	0	1183	1745	67.79	24	Grand Final	Devenish	13	15	93	Goorambat	8	10	58
Tatong	5	10	0	1476	1271	116.13	20									
Swanpool	0	15	0	348	3138	11.09	0									

=== 2006 Season ===
Ladder	Wins	Losses	Draws	For	Agst	%	Pts	Final	Team	G	B	Pts	Team	G	B	Pts
Goorambat	14	1	0	2068	804	257.21	56	1st Semi	Bonnie Doon	19	23	137	Swanpool	11	6	72
Longwood	10	5	0	1755	1426	123.07	40	2nd Semi	Goorambat	13	19	97	Longwood	11	12	78
Bonnie Doon	9	6	0	1753	1141	153.64	36	Preliminary	Bonnie Doon	21	18	144	Longwood	12	11	83
Swanpool	6	9	0	1183	1523	77.68	24	Grand Final	Goorambat	21	7	133	Bonnie Doon	15	7	97
Tatong	4	11	0	1227	1970	62.28	16									
Devenish	2	13	0	754	1876	40.19	8									

=== 2007 Season ===
Ladder	Wins	Losses	Draws	For	Agst	%	Pts	Final	Team	G	B	Pts	Team	G	B	Pts
Goorambat	13	3	0	1800	1045	172.25	52	1st Semi	Bonnie Doon	31	15	201	Tatong	7	4	46
Longwood	10	6	0	1701	1316	129.26	40	2nd Semi	Goorambat	21	11	137	Longwood	8	16	64
Bonnie Doon	10	6	0	1379	1411	97.73	40	Preliminary	Bonnie Doon	20	8	128	Longwood	18	16	124
Tatong	7	9	0	1526	1709	89.29	28	Grand Final	Goorambat	19	10	124	Bonnie Doon	13	11	89
Swanpool	0	16	0	953	1878	50.75	0									

=== 2008 Season ===
Ladder	Wins	Losses	Draws	For	Agst	%	Pts	Final	Team	G	B	Pts	Team	G	B	Pts
Bonnie Doon	16	0	0	2691	772	348.58	64	1st Semi	Longwood	5	3	33	Tatong	3	11	29
Goorambat	10	6	0	1653	1302	126.96	40	2nd Semi	Bonnie Doon	24	17	161	Goorambat	9	11	65
Tatong	9	7	0	1513	1794	84.34	36	Preliminary	Goorambat	8	15	63	Longwood	7	18	60
Longwood	4	12	0	1157	1948	59.39	16	Grand	Bonnie Doon	10	17	77	Goorambat	11	6	72
Swanpool	1	15	0	979	2177	44.97	4									

=== 2009 Season ===
Ladder	Wins	Losses	Draws	For	Agst	%	Pts	Final	Team	G	B	Pts	Team	G	B	Pts
Bonnie Doon	16	0	0	2569	382	672.51	64	1st Semi	Goorambat	12	12	84	Longwood	7	3	45
Swanpool	12	4	0	2235	1017	219.76	48	2nd Semi	Bonnie Doon	13	14	92	Swanpool	5	3	33
Goorambat	7	8	1	1661	1258	132.03	30	Preliminary	Swanpool	17	17	119	Goorambat	6	3	39
Longwood	4	11	1	983	1944	44.97	18	Grand	Bonnie Doon	19	12	126	Swanpool	4	9	33
Tatong	0	16	0	316	3163	9.99	0									
