= Euroa District Football Association =

Australian rules football Association

- Most recent season or competition: 1949
- Sport: Australian rules football
- Founded: 1903; 123 years ago
- First season: 1903
- Folded: 1949
- No. of teams: 36
- Country: Australia
- Venue: Euroa Sports Ground
- Continent: Australia
- Most titles: Longwood FC (7)
- Related competitions: Euroa Wednesday FA, North East (Euroa) FA, Hume Highway FA.

The Euroa District Football Association was formed in May 1903 and was active up until 1949.

== History ==
The Euroa District Football Association was formed in May 1903 from the following clubs – Euroa, Gooram, Miepoll, Rigg's Creek, Shean's Creek and Violet Town.

In 1894, there was a Euroa Football Association for one season only, with Euroa FC finishing on top of the ladder.

The Euroa Royals FC was formed in 1905 and wore the red and white colours and were known as the Tigers.

In the interest of football in Euroa in 1909, the Euroa Magpies FC and Euroa FC merged to form one club and entered the North East Football Association. The Euroa Wednesdays FC entered a team in the Euroa (Wednesday) Football Association.

In April 1920, clubs from the existing Euroa DFA met and formed the North East District Football Association.

In 1921, club colours were – Baddaginnie: green and white; Benalla Rovers: blue and white; Glenrowan: red, white and blue; Strathbogie: royal blue and black; Violet Town: maroon and gold; Euroa Imperials: black and white; Shean's Creek: green and gold.

In 1922, Benalla Rovers moved to the Yarrawonga FA, Longwood went into recess, which left only the Baddaginnie, Euroa Imperials and Violet Town teams, thus the North East FA went into recess.

In 1923, the North East FA was reformed from the following clubs – Baddaginnie, Euroa Imperials, Gooram, Longwood, Strathbogie and Violet Town.

In May 1934, Euroa FC and the Euroa Imperials FC merged to form Euroa United FC and entered one team in the Waranga North Eastern Football Association and the Euroa DFA changed its name to the Euroa Junior Football Association in May 1934. Euroa Seconds could not enter a team in the Euroa DFA in 1934, due to local North East rules.

In 1946, Strathbogie's Malcom Armstrong, won the Euroa DFL best and fairest award.

The Euroa DFA folded after the 1949 season and Euroa Seconds, Longwood and Strathbogie joined the re-established Hume Highway Football Association in 1950, which began back in 1931, but was in recess between 1947 and 1949.

In 1939, Seymour's Len Patford won the Hume Highway Football League's best and fairest award.

Robert Fox, from the Yarck Football Club won the 1952 Hume Highway Football League's best and fairest award.

In 1953, Pat Russell from the Yarck Football Club, won the Hume Highway Football League best and fairest award, the L D Roberstson Trophy, donated bt the league secretary.

In 1954, Ron Watkins, from Strathbogie, won the very last Hume Highway Football League best and fairest award before the league folded.

== Clubs ==
=== Final ===
Club	Colours	Nickname	Home Ground	Former League	Est.	Years in EDFA	Premierships		Fate
Club	Colours	Nickname	Home Ground	Former League	Est.	Years in EDFA	Total	Years	Fate
Euroa Seconds		Magpies	Euroa Memorial Reserve, Euroa	–	1880	1935–1939, 1944–1949	1	1946	Recess from 1940-43. Moved to Hume Highway FA in 1950
Longwood		Redlegs	Longwood Recreation Reserve, Longwood	NEFA, WNEFA	1888	1904–1908, 1913–1914, 1920–1937, 1944–1949	7	1906, 1908, 1924, 1930, 1934, 1935, 1936	Played in North Eastern FA between 1909-12. Recess between 1938-43. Moved to Hume Highway FA in 1950
Miepoll			Miepoll Recreation Reserve, Miepoll	–	1900s	1903–1906, 1908, 1913, 1926–1939, 1948–1949	3	1929, 1937, 1938	Recess in 1907, 1909-12, 1914-25 and 1940-47. Moved to Central Goulburn Valley FL in 1950
Strathbogie			Strathbogie Recreation Reserve, Strathbogie	SFA	1900s	1905–1908, 1912–1913, 1919, 1921, 1923–1926, 1928–1930, 1934–1939, 1944–1949	3	1912, 1939, 1947	Played in Strathbogie FA in 1922 and 1927. Recess in 1909-11, 1914-18, 1920, 1931-33 and 1940-43. Moved to Hume Highway FA in 1950
Violet Town		Towners	Violet Town Recreation Reserve, Violet Town	NEFA, TTFA	1880	1903–1904, 1909–1910, 1912–1914, 1919–1935, 1944–1949	6	1923, 1927, 1928, 1943, 1948, 1949	Recess in 1905-08, 1911, and 1915-18. Played in Tatong Thoona FA between 1936-45. Moved to Benalla Tungamah FL in 1950

=== Former ===
Club	Colours	Nickname	Home Ground	Former League	Est.	Years in EDFA	Premierships		Fate
Club	Colours	Nickname	Home Ground	Former League	Est.	Years in EDFA	Total	Years	Fate
Avenel		Swans	Avenel Recreation Reserve, Avenel	NEFA, WNEFA	1881	1945–1946	0	–	Returned to Waranga North East FA in 1947
Baddaginnie			HG Parker Memorial Reserve, Baddaginnie	–		1907, 1909–1911, 1919–1927	2	1909, 1925	Recess in 1908 and 1912-18. Moved to Tatong & Thoona FA in 1931
Balmattum				–		1914, 1920	0	–	Folded
Benalla		Tigers	Benalla Showgrounds, Benalla	O&MFL	1871	1931–1934	3	1931, 1932, 1933	Returned to Benalla Mulwala FL in 1935
Benalla Gymnasium			Benalla Showgrounds, Benalla	–	1907	1909–1911	1	1910	Moved to North Eastern Wednesday FA in 1912
Benalla Imperials			Benalla Showgrounds, Benalla	B&DFL	1929	1932–1933	0	–	Merged with Benalla in 1934
Benalla Rovers			Benalla Showgrounds, Benalla	–	1920	1920–1921	2	1920, 1921	Moved to Benalla-Yarrawonga Line FL in 1922
Benalla United			Benalla Showgrounds, Benalla	–	1911	1911-	0	–	Moved to North Eastern Wednesday FA in 1912
Bonnie Doon		Bulldogs	Bonnie Doon Recreation Reserve, Bonnie Doon	MDFA	1885	1937	0	–	Moved to Mansfield-Alexandra FA in 1938
Castle Creek				–		1904–1905	0	–	Folded after round 1, 1905
Euroa			Euroa Memorial Reserve, Euroa	NEFA, WNEFA	1880	1903–1908, 1930–1933	1	1905	Moved to North Eastern FA in 1909. Merged with Euroa Imperials to form Euroa United in Waranga North East FA in 1934
Euroa Blues		Blues	Euroa Memorial Reserve, Euroa	–		1926	0	–	Folded
Euroa Imperials			Euroa Memorial Reserve, Euroa	–		1913–1933	2	1926, 1930	Merged with Euroa to form Euroa United in Waranga North East FA in 1934
Euroa Juniors			Euroa Memorial Reserve, Euroa	–		1912	0	–	?
Euroa Royals			Euroa Memorial Reserve, Euroa	–		1905–1906	0	–	?
Euroa Wednesdays			Euroa Memorial Reserve, Euroa	–		1909–1911	1	1911	Folded
Gooram				–		1903–1904, 1912–1914, 1919	5	1903, 1904, 1912, 1913, 1919	Folded
Glenrowan			Glenrowan Recreation Reserve, Glenrowan	GFA	1919	1920–1921, 1932	0	–	Moved to Tatong & Thoona FA in 1934
Half Holidays			Benalla Showgrounds, Benalla	–		1908	0	–	Folded
Karramomus				–		1913	0	–	Folded
Kialla West			Kialla West Recreation Reserve, Kialla	–		1938–1939	0	–	Folded
Merton			Merton Cricket Ground, Merton	MDFA		1946	0	–	Moved to Upper Goulburn FL in 1947
Moglonemby				–		1914	0	–	Folded
Murchison			Murchison Recreation Reserve, Murchison	GVFL		1945	1	1945	Returned to Goulburn Valley FL in 1946
Old Town Magpies		Magpies	Euroa Memorial Reserve, Euroa	–		1907–1908	1	1907	Folded
Rigg's Creek				–		1903–1904	0	–	Folded
Ruffy			Maygar Park, Ruffy	–	1926	1926–1927	0	–	Folded, later re-formed in Hume Highway FA in 1954
Shean's Creek				–		1903–1905, 1919–1921	0	–	Folded
Winton			Winton Recreation Reserve, Winton	–	1900s	1909–1911, 1920	0	–	Moved to Greta & Thoona FA in 1924

== Grand Final Scores ==
=== Euroa and District FA ===
Year	Premiers	Score	Runner up	Score	Grand Final Venue
Euroa DFA
1903	Gooram		?		
1904	Gooram				Gooram Premiers
1904	Longwood: 2nd	4.8 – 32	Euroa: 3rd	4.6 – 30	Euroa. Play-off for 2nd.
1905	Euroa	5.8 – 38	Longwood	3.8 – 26	Shean's Creek
1906	Longwood	6.10 – 46	Euroa	4.7 – 31	Longwood
1907	Euroa Magpies	7.5 – 47	Euroa	5.11 – 41	Euroa Sportground
1908	Longwood	defeated	Euroa		who refused to play at Longwood
Euroa (Wednesday) DFA
1909	Baddaginnie	6.8 – 44	Euroa Wednesdays	4.10 – 34	Violet Town
1910	Benalla Gymnasium	9.9 – 63	Baddaginnie	4.12 – 36	Euroa
1911	Euroa Wednesdays	7.14 – 56	Benalla Gymnasium	7.12 – 54	Baddaginnie
Euroa DFA
1912	Strathbogie	5.14 – 44	Gooram	3.5 – 23	Euroa
1913	Gooram	5.15 – 45	Longwood	5.3 – 33	Euroa
1914	Gooram	defeated	Longwood	by 2 points	Euroa Sportsground
1915–18	In recess > WW1				
1919	Gooram	5.14 – 44	Violet Town	3.8 – 26	Euroa Sportsground
N E (Euroa) Football Association
1920	Benalla Rovers	11.20 – 86	Longwood	5.6 – 36	Euroa Sportsground
1921	Benalla Rovers	10.5 – 65	Shean's Creek	5.9 – 39	Euroa Sportsground
1922	NEFA in recess.				
1923	Violet Town	6.9 – 45	Longwood	4.10 – 34	
1924	Longwood	9.14 – 68	Euroa Imperials	6.6 – 42	
Euroa DFA
1925	Baddaginnie	6.16 – 52	Strathbogie	6.9 – 45	Euroa Sportsground
1926	Euroa Imperials	7.4 – 46	Euroa Blues	3.9 – 27	Euroa Sportground
1927	Violet Town	10.4 – 64	Longwood	7.6 – 48	
1928	Violet Town	defeated	Longwood	by 5 points	
1929	Miepoll	defeated	Longwood	by 20 points	
1930	Euroa Imperials	defeated	Longwood	by 26 points	Longwood won on appeal
1931	Benalla A	8.11 – 59	Euroa Imperials	8.5 – 53	Euroa Sportsground
1932	Benalla A	11.12 – 78	Euroa Imperials	9.12 – 66	
1933	Benalla A	11.10 – 76	Euroa Imperials	9.10 – 64	Benalla Showgrounds
1934	Longwood	7.16 – 58	Violet Town	3.10 – 28	
1935	Longwood	9.14 – 68	Miepoll	9.8 – 62	
1936	Longwood	16.21 – 117	Miepoll	14.16 – 100	
1937	Miepoll	defeated	Strathbogie		
1938	Miepoll	9.10 – 64	Euroa Seconds	7.5 – 47	
1939	Strathbogie	10.21 – 81	Miepoll	7.15 – 57	Euroa Sportsground
1940–42	In recess > WW2				
Slap-Dash Knockout
1943	Violet Town	6.11 – 47	Euroa	2.2 – 14	Euroa. Knockout comp in 1943
Euroa District FA
1944	Violet Town		Euroa 2nds		Euroa Sportsground
1945	Murchison	26.17 – 173	Euroa 2nds	9.9 – 63	Longwood
1946	Euroa 2nds				
1947	Strathbogie				
1948	Violet Town				
1949	Violet Town	13.11 – 89	Strathbogie	5.6 – 36	Euroa Umpire: Ireland
Year	Premiers	Score	Runner up	Score	Grand Final Venue

==== Totals ====
Club	Premierships	Runners up	Grand Finals
Longwood	7*	9	16
Violet Town	6	2	8
Gooram	5	1	6
Miepoll	3	3	6
Strathbogie	3	3	6
Benalla A	3	0	3
Euroa	2	6	8
Baddaginnie	2	1	3
Benalla Rovers	2	0	2
Euroa Imperials	1	5	6
Benalla Gymnasium	1	1	2
Euroa Wednesdays	1	1	2
Euroa Magpies	1	0	1
Murchison	1	0	1
Euroa Blues	0	1	1
Shean's Creek	0	1	1
TOTAL	38	34	71

- Does not include Slap Dash Knockout wins.
- Longwood: includes their 1930 premiership "win".

=== Hume Highway Football League Premierships ===
Year	Premiers	Score	Runner up	Score	Grand Final Venue
1931	Broadford Independents	7.10 – 52	Tallarook	4.6 – 30	
1932	Tallarook	12.11 – 83	Kilmore	8.11 – 59	Tallarook undefeated
1933	Broadford Independents	11.9 – 75	Wallan East	3.14 – 32	
1934	Wallan	9.19 – 73	Broadford 2nds	7.8 – 50	
1935	Seymour 2nds	16.16 – 112	Darraweit Guim	16.8 – 104	Broadford
1936	Darraweit Guim	defeated	Broadford 2nds		Broadford
1937	Broadford Independents	15.10 – 100	Wallan	9.10 – 64	Broadford
1938	Kilmore	10.14 – 74	Wallan	9.12 – 66	Broadford
1939	Kilmore	12.17 – 89	Tallarook	12.7 – 79	Broadford
1940	Kilmore	11.4 – 70	Broadford 2nds	5.7 – 37	Romsey
1941–44	HHFL in recess > WW2				
1945	Broadford	defeated	Lancefield		
1946	Broadford	18.20 – 128	Kilmore	7.9 – 51	Kilmore
1947–49	HHFL in recess.				
1950	Strathbogie	11.7 – 73	Broadford 2nds	8.13 – 61	Euroa
1951	Strathbogie	13.15 – 93	Longwood	6.15 – 51	Yarck
1952	Strathbogie	12.21 – 93	Longwood	9.13 – 67	
1953	Longwood	12.4 – 76	Strathbogie	8.9 – 57	Avenel
1954	Strathbogie		Longwood		
Year	Premiers	Score	Runner up	Score	Grand Final Venue

==== Totals ====
Club	Premierships	Runners up	Grand Finals
Strathbogie	4	1	5
Kilmore	3	2	5
Broadford Independents	3	0	3
Broadford	2	0	2
Longwood	1	3	4
Tallarook	1	2	3
Wallan	1	2	3
Darraweit Guim	1	1	2
Seymour 2nds	1	0	1
Broadford 2nds	0	4	4
Lancefield	0	1	1
Wallan East	0	1	1
TOTAL	17	17	34

== Links ==
- 1926 – Euroa DFA Premiers: Euroa Imperials FC team photo
- 1929 – Euroa DFA Premiers: Miepoll FC (Weekly Times) team photo
- 1929 – Euroa DFA Premiers: Miepoll FC (The Sun News-Pictorial) team photo
- 1937 – Euroa DFA semi final: Euroa FC team photo
