= Steve Bravo =

Australian rules footballer, born 1912

Personal information
- Full name: Steve Bravo
- Born: 26 May 1912
- Died: 6 October 1999 (aged 87)
- Original team: Newbridge
- Height: 193 cm (6 ft 4 in)
- Weight: 94 kg (207 lb)

Playing career^{1}
Years	Club	Games (Goals)
1933–36	Hawthorn	31 (12)
- ^{1} Playing statistics correct to the end of 1936.

Steve Bravo (26 May 1912 – 6 October 1999) was an Australian rules footballer who played with Hawthorn in the Victorian Football League (VFL).
