= Bob Flanigan (footballer) =

Australian rules footballer (1914–1988)

Personal information
- Full name: Robert Edwin Flanigan
- Born: 25 March 1914; Wangaratta
- Died: 12 July 1988 (aged 74); Traralgon
- Original teams: Myrrhee, Milawa, Alphington
- Height: 175 cm (5 ft 9 in)
- Weight: 74 kg (163 lb)

Playing career^{1}
Years	Club	Games (Goals)
1936–1940	Footscray	49 (1)
1941–1942, 1944–1945	Essendon	42 (1)
Total		91 (2)
- ^{1} Playing statistics correct to the end of 1945.

Bob 'Bluestone' Flanigan (25 March 1914 – 12 July 1988) was an Australian rules footballer who played for Footscray and Essendon in the Victorian Football League (VFL). His surname has also been spelt Flanagan and Flanegan on some sources. His surname is spelt as Flanagan on the Ancestry website.

Flanigan trained with Melbourne during their pre season of 1935.

A left footed half back, Flanigan was renowned for his toughness and once fractured his skull while at Footscray. He polled well for Footscray in the 1937 Brownlow Medal where he was their second largest vote getter.

In 1941, his first season with Essendon, Flanigan was a losing Grand Finalist but the following year he played as a half back flanker in their 1942 VFL premiership team.

Flanigan was later captain-coach of Morwell Football Club in 1946 and 1947. Flanigan won the 1946 Central Gippsland Football League best and fairest award, the Rodda Medal.

Flanigan played in Morwell's 1948 losing Central Gippsland FL grand final against Yallourn.

Flanigan was a member of Hazelwood's 1952 and 1953 Mid Gippsland Football League premiership teams.

Flanigan kicked six goals for Hazelwood in the 1953 Mid Gippsland Football League's Lightening Premiership grand final.

Flanigan played as captain-coach in Hazelwood's losing 1954 Mid Gippsland Football League grand final side, kicking three goals. Flanigan was captain-coach in 1955 too.

He was the brother of former Hawthorn player, Jack Flanigan.

== Links ==
- Bob Flanigan's playing statistics from AFL Tables
- Holmesby, Russell and Main, Jim (2007). The Encyclopedia of AFL Footballers. 7th ed. Melbourne: Bas Publishing.
- 1942 VFL Premiers: Essendon FC team photo
- 1947 Morewell FC team photo
- 1952 - Mid Gippsland FL Premiers: Hazelwood FC team photo
- On Reflection: Bob "Bluestone" Flanigan
