= Violet Town Football Club =

Australian football club

Violet Town FNC Inc.

Names
- Full name: Violet Town Football Netball Club
- Nickname: Towners

Club details
- Founded: 1880
- Colours: Red Yellow Blue
- Competition: Kyabram DFL since 2006
- Premierships: 1911, 1923, 1927, 1928, 1938, 1939, 1944, 1948, 1949, 1960, 1961, 1982, 1987, 1990, 2012.
- Ground: Violet Town Recreation Reserve "the palace of Tulip Street"

The club is currently part of the Kyabram District Football and Netball League (KDFNL) and has five football teams: Seniors, Reserves, Under 18's, Under 15's and Under 12's.

The club recently won an Under 18's premiership in 2023, having gone undefeated all season.

The club has also amalgamated with the Violet Town netball club to become the Violet Town Football and Netball Club Inc.

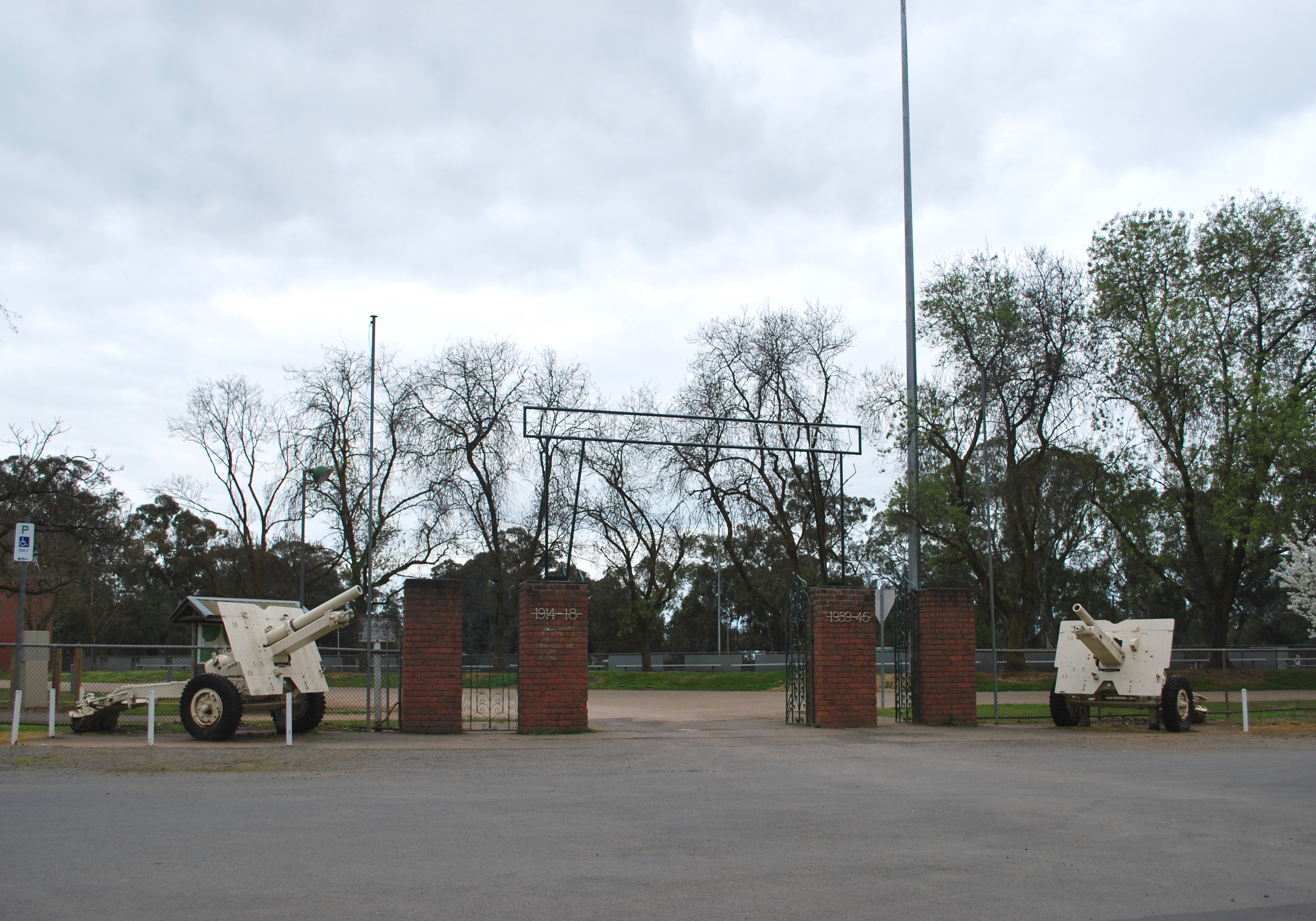
Violet Town War Memorial Gates

== History ==
Violet Town Football Club is an Australian football club which was established in 1880 and has won 15 football premierships in various Australian rules football leagues.

One of the first recorded Australian Rules football matches for Violet Town was a contest against Euroa on Saturday, 19 July 1884 in Violet Town, with J. Clancy as captain, with Euroa, 4.15 - 39 defeating Violet Town 0.5 - 5.

In 1904, the club colors were a navy blue guernsey, blue pants and maroon stockings.

In 1943, Violet Town defeated Euroa in the grand final of the Slap Dash Knockout Football Competition.

In 1949, Violet Town's Bruce Smith kicked 99 goals for the season, which included five goals in their grand final victory against Strathbogie.

== Football Leagues Timelines ==
- 1880 to 1895: No official competition matches, but the club did play many matches against other local clubs.
- 1896 to 1898: North East Football Association
- 1899 to 1902: ?
- 1903 to 1904: Euroa District Football Association
- 1905: Violet Town Football Association
- 1906 to 1907: ?
- 1908 to 1912 : Violet Town Wednesday Football Association
- 1913 to 1914: Euroa District Football Association. 1913 Premiers: Gooram FC, 1914 Premiers: Gooram d Violet Town
- 1915 to 1918: Club in recess due to WW1, but local junior football was played in and around the Violet Town area.
- 1919: Euroa District Football Association 1919 Premiers: Gooram d Violet Town
- 1920 to 1921: North East Football Association 1920 & 1921 Premiers: Benalla Rovers
- 1922: Club in recess.
- 1923 to 1935: Euroa District Football Association
- 1936 to 1940: Tatong / Thoona Football Association
- 1944 to 1945: Euroa District Football Association
- 1946 to 1947: Benalla & District Football League
- 1948 to 1949: Euroa District Football Association
- 1950 to 1966: Benalla Tungamah Football League
- 1967 to 1977: Tungamah Football League
- 1978 to 2005: Benalla & District Football League
- 2006 to present day: Kyabram District Football League

== Location ==
Violet Town is located in North Eastern Victoria, Australia; the town is found on the route between Melbourne and Albury and is approximately 180 km north-north-east of Melbourne and is between Euroa and Benalla and is bypassed by the Hume Freeway (and former Hume Highway) which are found to the south.

== Football Premierships ==
Seniors

- Violet Town Football Association (J D Nicholls Cup, Farmer's Arm Hotel)
  - 1911 - Violet Town: 3.12 - 30 d Karramomus: 2.9 - 21
- North Eastern Football Association
  - 1923 - Violet Town: 6.9 - 45 d Longwood: 4.10 - 34
- Euroa District Football Association
  - 1927 - Violet Town: 10.4 - 64 d Longwood: 7.6 - 48
  - 1928 - Violet Town: d Longwood: by five points.
- Tatong & Thoona Football Association
  - 1938 - Violet Town: 17.15 - 117 d Benalla All Blacks: 12.11 - 83
  - 1939 - Violet Town: 12.15 - 87 d Tatong: 4.6 - 30
- Euroa District Football Association
  - 1944 - Violet Town d Euroa
  - 1948 - Violet Town d
  - 1949 - Violet Town: 13.11 - 89 d Strathbogie: 5.6 - 36
- Benalla Tungamah Football League
  - 1960, 1961
- Benalla & District Football League
  - 1982, 1987, 1990
- Kyabram District Football League
  - 2012

Reserves

- Nil

Third 18 (Under 18's)

- Kyabram & District Football League
  - 2007, 2023 (undefeated premiers and champions)

Fourth 18 (Under 15s)

- Kyabram & District Football League
  - 2024

== Football Runners up ==
Seniors

- Euroa District Football Association
  - 1919 - Gooram: 5.14 - 44 d Violet Town: 3.8 - 26
  - 1934 - Longwood: 7.16 - 58 d Violet Town: 3.10 - 28
- Tatong / Thoona Football Association
  - 1936 - Benalla All Blacks: 12.24 - 96 d Violet Town: 10.12 - 72
  - 1937 - Benalla All Blacks: 13.9 - 87 d Violet Town: 10.14 - 74
  - 1940 - Benalla All Blacks: 13.9 - 87 d Violet Town: 9.5 - 39
- Benalla & District Football League
  - 1946 - Benalla 2nds: 12.17 - 89 d Violet Town: 12.11 - 83
  - 1991 - Thornton-Eildon: 19.9 - 123 d Violet Town: 6.10 - 46
- Benalla Tungamah Football League
  - 1952 - Benalla 2nds: 13.12 - 90 d Violet Town: 11.16 - 82
  - 1959 - Mulwala: 12.16 - 88 d Violet Town: 6.10 -46

== Violet Town Football Association ==
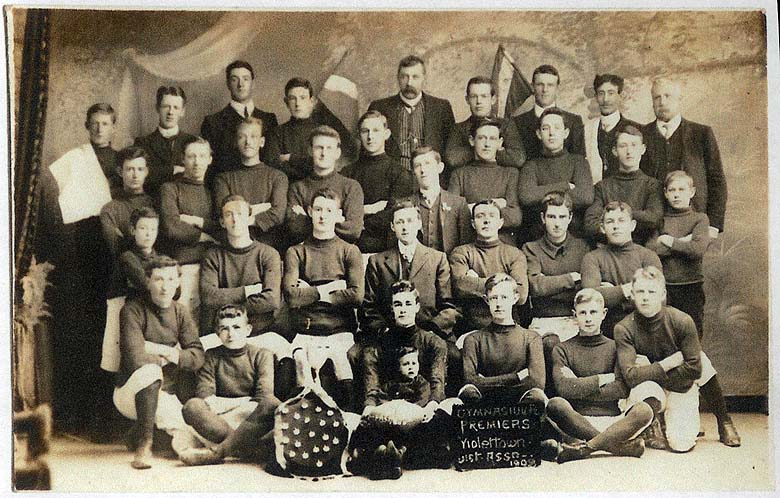
1908 Violet Town FA Premiers: Benalla Gymnasium FC

Established in 1907, the Violet Town Football Association ran between 1905 and 1911, with the following clubs participating - Baddaginnie, Benalla Gymnasium (blue & white colours), Caniambo West, Euroa, Gooram, Karramomos, Strathbogie and Violet Town.

Premiers / Grand Finals

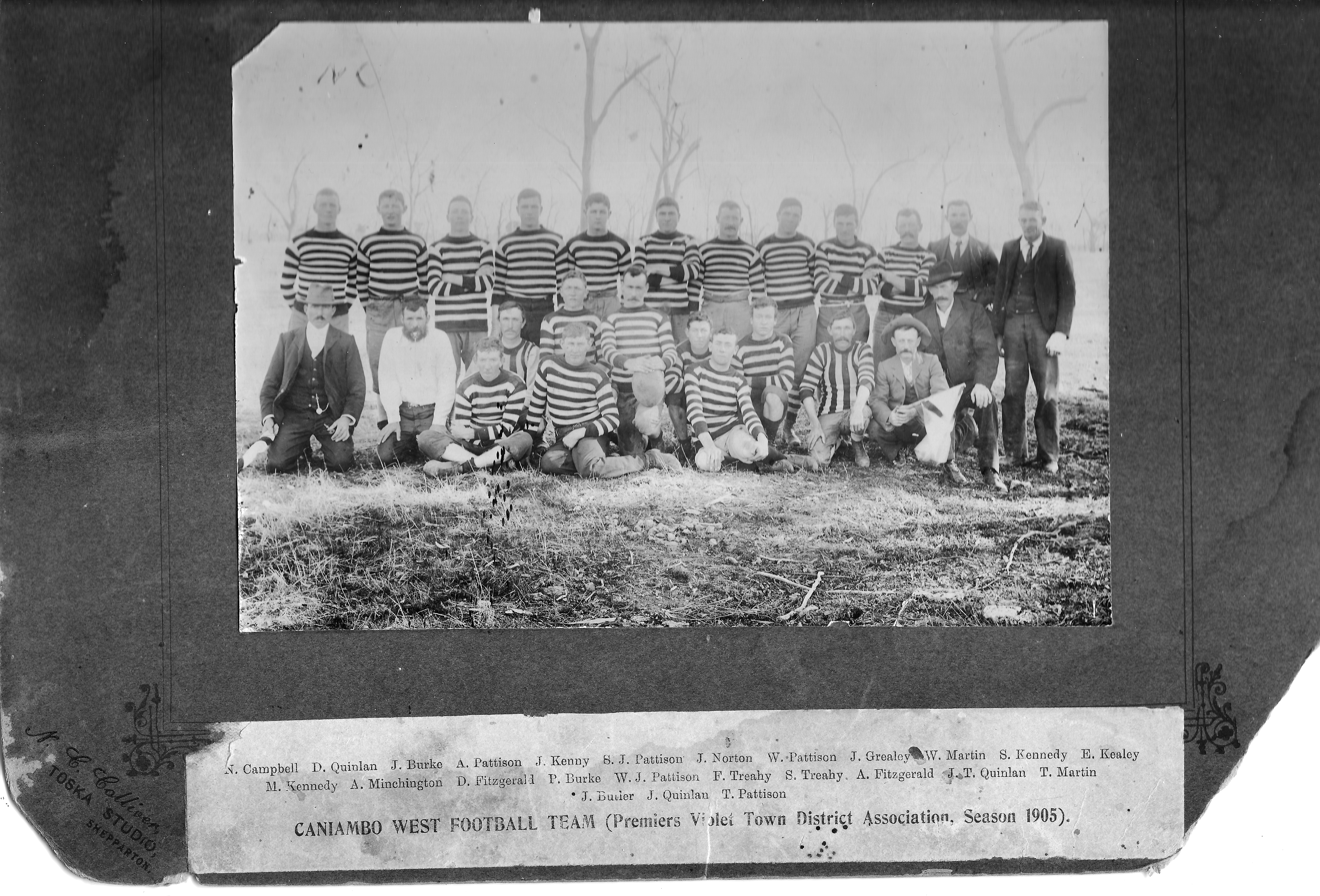
1905 Premiers Violet Town District Football Association

- 1905 - Caniambo West: 4.12 - 36 d Baddaginnie: 2.6 - 18
- 1906 & 1907: This football competition appears to be in recess.
- 1908 - Benalla Gymnasium: 9.14 - 68 d Euroa: 3.11 - 29
- 1909 - Baddaginnie: 6.8 - 44 d Euroa: 4.10 - 34
- 1910 - Baddaginnie: 9.11 - Euroa: 5.6 - 36
- 1911 - Violet Town: 3.12 - 30 d Karramomos: 2.9 - 21

== Team Song ==
The team song has three official verses. They are as follows:

We're a happy team at Violet Town

We're the mighty flying town.

One for all, and all for one

The way we play at Towners,

We are the mighty flying Town.

There are times when you'll see us,

busting our guts!

There are times when you'll wish that,

you'd never known us!

There are times when you'll know

That we're really made of gold

We are the boys from Violet Town.

You'll see us in the finals,

you'll see us do or die.

We'll fight and fight forever,

To see the banner fly.

Are we good? Are we good?

Are we any bloody good?

We are the boys from Violet Town!
