= Nagambie Lakes wine region =

- Wine region
- Official name: Nagambie Lakes
- Type: AGI (sub region)
- Year established: 2001
- Years of wine industry: Since 1860
- Country: Australia
- Part of: Goulburn Valley wine region
- Heat units: 1694
- Precipitation (annual average): 250 millimetres (9.8 in)
- Varietals produced: shiraz, chardonnay, cabernet sauvignon, sauvignon blanc, marsanne, merlot
- No. of wineries: 8

Nagambie Lakes is a subregion of the Goulburn Valley wine region in the Australian state of Victoria. Lake Nagambie on the Goulburn River is the largest waterbody in the region, and Nagambie is the main town.

The first vineyards and winery were established in the area in 1860. Tahbilk was the original winery, and still produces some wine from vines planted in the 1860s. Mitchelton Wines is another significant winery, established in 1969.

The key varieties in the region include shiraz, chardonnay, cabernet sauvignon, sauvignon blanc, marsanne and merlot. Slightly more red than white wine is produced. The soil is rich in iron oxide, and is both well-draining and moisture-retentive.
