= Goulburn Valley wine region =

- Wine region
- Official name: Goulburn Valley
- Type: Australian Geographical Indication
- Year established: 1999
- Country: Australia
- Part of: Central Victoria
- Sub-regions: Nagambie Lakes
- Varietals produced: Cabernet Sauvignon, Chardonnay, Marsanne, Riesling, Shiraz

Goulburn Valley wine region is a wine region in the state of Victoria in Australia. It is part of the Central Victoria zone and roughly corresponds to the Goulburn Valley tourist and government region.

The first vineyards and winery were established in the Goulburn Valley in 1860. Tahbilk was the original winery, and still produces some wine from vines planted in the 1860s. The Australian Geographical Indication "Goulburn Valley" has been protected since 29 November 1999.

Tahbilk was founded by a syndicate which raised £25,000 to develop the winery. By 1875 trade with England had been established, and the winery was producing the equivalent of 70,000 cases of wine per year. Due to the sandy soil, Tahbilk was able to withstand the spread of Phylloxera, and in 1925 was the only winery in the area. As a result, the region is home to the oldest and largest plantings of Marsanne grape variety in the world. Other wine varieties grown include Chardonnay, Cabernet Sauvignon, Riesling and Shiraz. As well as Tahbilk, other major wineries include Michelton between Seymour and Nagambie, Wine by Sam, Fowles Wines and boutique vineyards Box Grove and Brave Goose vineyard in the south near Seymour and Monichino near Katunga in the north. Nagambie Lakes is a recognised and protected subregion of the Goulburn Valley wine region.

Each year Tastes of the Goulburn food and wine festival is hosted in Seymour, showcasing the best local produce from the Goulburn Valley. Seymour also hosts the Victorian Wine Show.

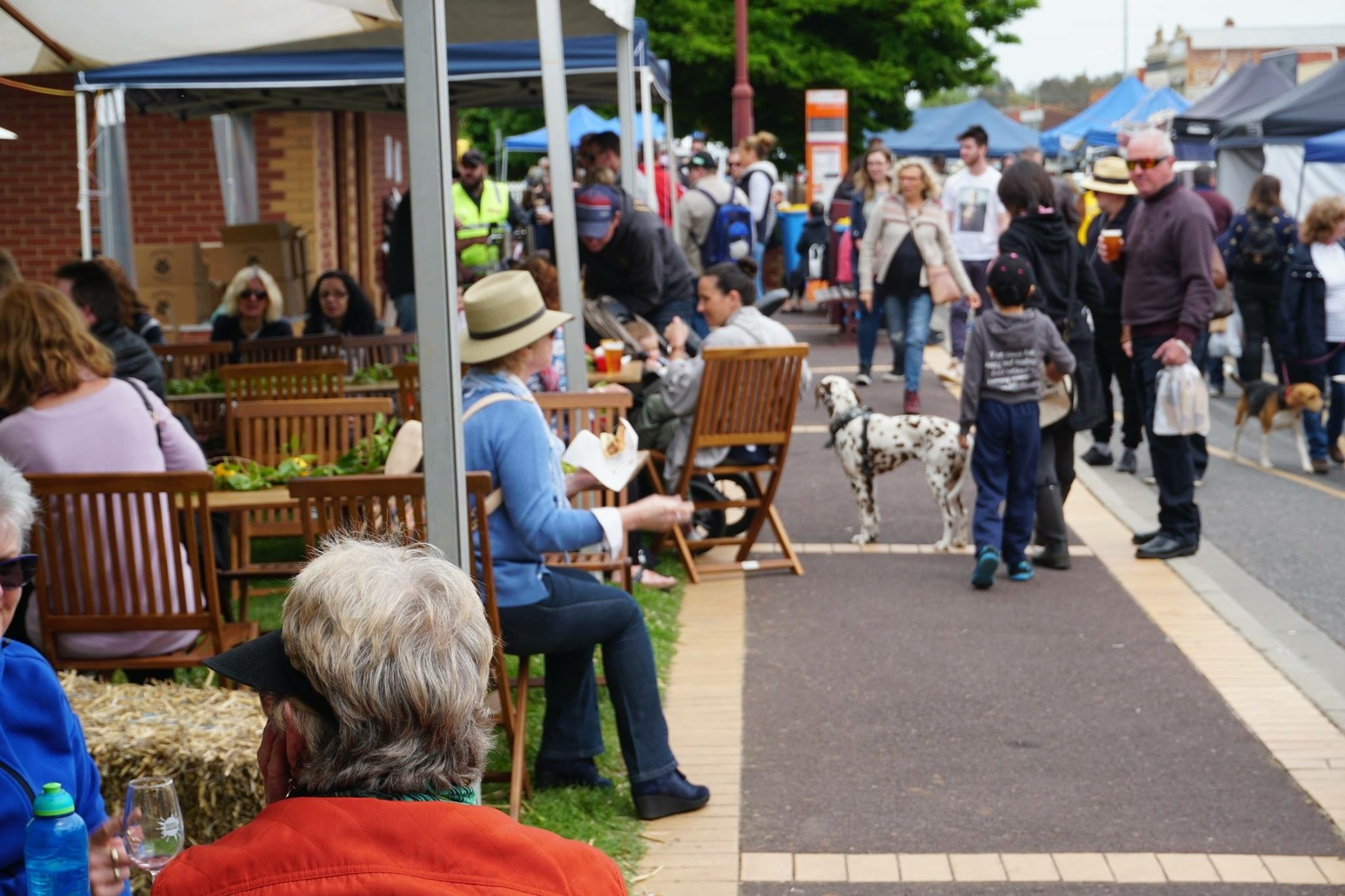
Tastes of the Goulburn Food and Wine festival, held in Seymour annually in October

== Geography ==
The Goulburn Valley wine region contains one recognised subregion. The Nagambie Lakes subregion surrounds the town of Nagambie and the artificial Lake Nagambie.

Goulburn Valley wine region is roughly triangular. The northern boundary is the Murray River between Echuca to Yarrawonga, including both towns. Shepparton is near the middle of the region, and the southern point is south of Seymour.
