= Nagambie =

- Town
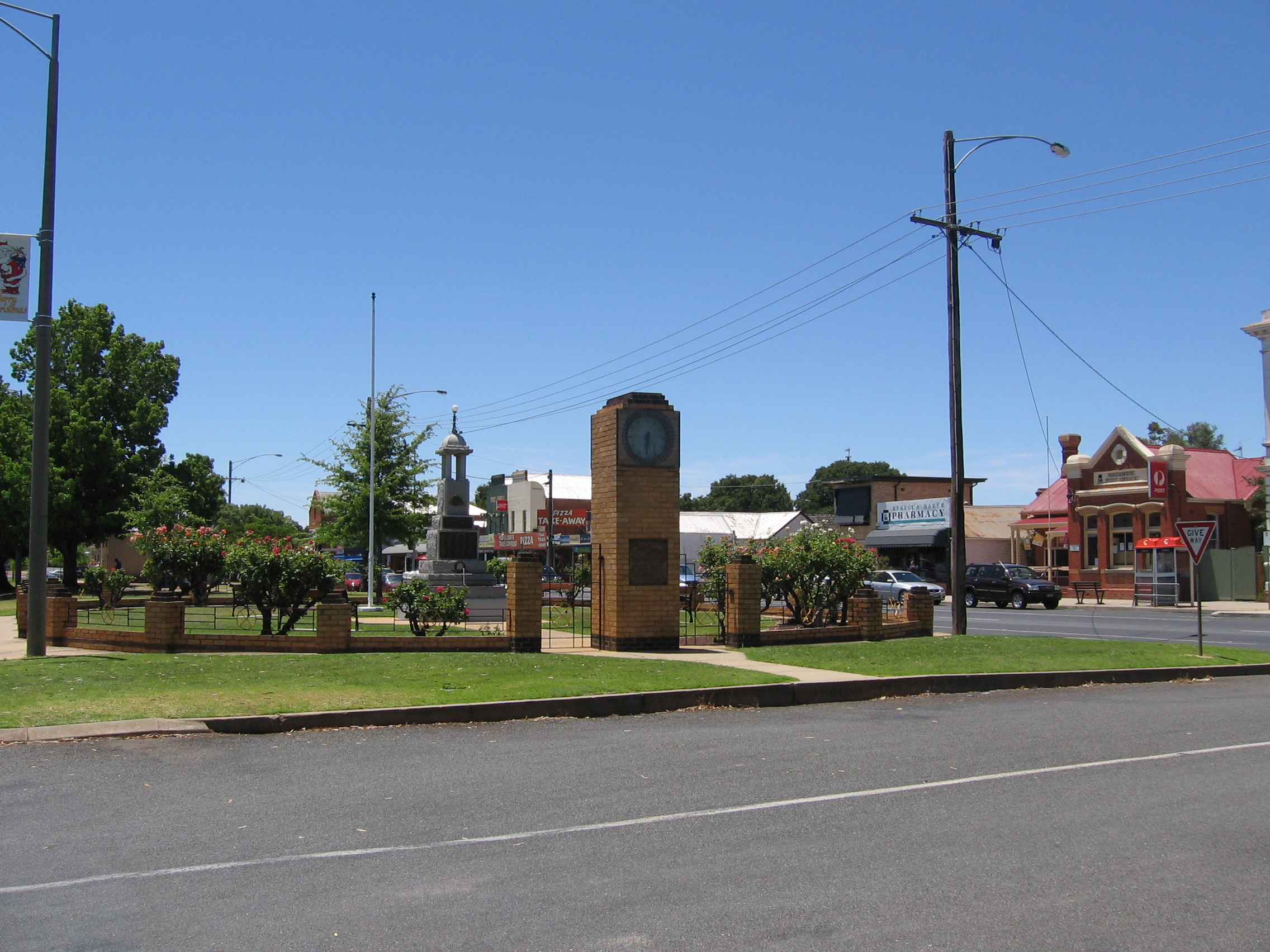
- Memorial Park and main street, 2006

- Interactive map of Nagambie
- Coordinates: 36°46′13″S 145°09′18″E
- Country: Australia
- State: Victoria
- Region: Hume
- LGA: Shire of Strathbogie
- Location: 122 km (76 mi) from Melbourne; 53 km (33 mi) from Shepparton
- Established: 1870

Government
  - State electorate: Euroa
  - Federal division: Nicholls

Population
  - Total: 2,254 (2021 census)
- Postcode: 3608
Localities around Nagambie
Kirwans Bridge	Wahring	Arcadia South
Tooborac	Nagambie	Longwood
Hilldene	Seymour	Avenel

Nagambie /nəˈɡæmbi/ is a town in the Goulburn Valley region of Victoria, Australia. The city is on the Goulburn Valley Freeway north of Seymour and in the Shire of Strathbogie. In the 2021 census, Nagambie had a population of 2,254.

== History ==
The Nagambie Region is in the traditional lands of the Taungurung people, who are the first inhabitants of the rivers, valleys and mountains in this region. The Taungurung lived according to the natural cycles and rhythms of the land, moving through their country seasonally, occupying the more cooler mountain areas in summer and autumn and the tributaries of the Goulburn River in winter and spring.

Prior to the building of the Goulburn Weir, the Goulburn River at Nagambie was the site of several lagoons which, along with nearby Reedy Lake, provided an ideal camping place for the Taungurung people.

The river, and its associated tributaries and wetlands, provided an abundance of food resources. Emus, kangaroos, possums and wombats were hunted by Taungurung for food and clothing, and the river ecosystem also provided fresh-water fish, eels, crustaceans and waterfowl.

Trading routes passed through the area and the much-prized greenstone from a quarry at Mount Carmel, about 30 kilometres (19 mi) north-west of Reedy Creek, was used to make axes. Another well-known greenstone quarry is at Mount William, in Woiwurrung country to the south.

The Taungurung people travelled between Reedy Lake and Mount Carmel to procure the stone. Conveniently spaced camping places were used to make the journey along the trade route, from Gunn's Swamp (now the Waranga Basin) to the rock well at Whroo, then to Lake Cooper at the foothills of the Mount Carmel range.The Taungurung people also obtained quartz and silcrete for the manufacture of tools for hunting and food preparation from Mount Balck, within the Helathcote-Graytown National Park. Today, the Taungurung people still live on country and are active in the protection and preservation of their culture and land.

Soon after European settlement, a crossing on the Goulburn River was developed by overlanders following the route used by explorer Thomas Mitchell. It then became part of the mail route from Melbourne to Sydney, established in 1838. A hotel, church and blacksmith were set up, serving traffic travelling to Adelaide along the river systems. The town was surveyed in 1868, with the first land sales in 1870.

A post office opened on 2 May 1870, and Nagambie was proclaimed as a "private town" in 1872, with the name being derived from the local Aboriginal word meaning lagoon. and the Nagambie railway station opened in 1880. It is now served by V/Line on the Tocumwal line to Melbourne.

Nagambie sits on the shores of Lake Nagambie, an artificial lake created by the Goulburn Weir in 1891, where rowing regattas and waterskiing tournaments are held.The town holds the Australian Rowing Championships semi-regularly.

== Events and attractions ==
Nagambie is home to the Nagambie Lakes, which form a regional reservoir, and are the venue for many state and national rowing championships. The Nagambie Lakes Regatta Centre is one of Victoria's major water sports facilities. The venue offers a 2000m, fully-buoyed, national standard rowing and canoeing course.

Nagambie On Water is an annual community event, featuring water themed activities, grape stomping, river to pub races and many other elements. This event is held in March each year.

New Year's Eve Fireworks are also held in the Nagambie Lakes area.

Nagambie Lakes Community Market runs monthly on the bank of Lake Nagambie and a Farmers Market on the fourth Sunday of the month at Tahbilk winery.

== Wine ==
Nagambie gives its name to the Nagambie Lakes wine region, a subregion of the Goulburn Valley wine region.

The town hosts the Goulburn Valley Vintage Festival in March each year, and the Shiraz Challenge in November. A number of wineries are situated in the area, including Mitchelton, and Tahbilk.

== Highway bypass ==
The Goulburn Valley Highway was originally routed through the centre of Nagambie, bringing often large volumes of through traffic from Melbourne and Seymour en route to Shepparton and southern New South Wales.

The town was bypassed in 2013 with the completion of the freeway-standard road routed to the eastern side of the town from the previous limit of the freeway to 6km north of Nagambie.

The effect of the removal of through traffic was a dramatically quieter environment. Business and trade in the town generated by vehicle stops has also dried up. That was expected to be replaced by a service station and fast-food complex located on north and southbound locations on the bypass freeway. Whilst the town experienced a decline in traffic, significant housing estates were developd, including the Elloura Lake Nagambie Development and further estate development in the north and south of the area.

It became possible to journey from Melbourne to Shepparton on a freeway-standard road without travelling through any of the towns previously served by the Hume and Goulburn Valley highways.

== Education ==
Nagambie is served by two primary schools, both providing education from Prep to Year 6:

- Nagambie Primary School (Government)
- St Joseph's School (Catholic)

The Catholic school was previously known as St Malachy's and was founded in 1923, becoming St Joseph's in honour of the Sisters of St Joseph who took charge of the school. There are no secondary schools in Nagambie; the nearest are in neighbouring towns.

== Sport ==
Nagambie Football Club competes in the Kyabram District Football Netball League. Golfers play at the Nagambie Golf Club on the former Goulburn Valley Highway. Nagambie is the birthplace of the champion racehorse Black Caviar.

== Media ==
=== Print ===
- Nagambie Community Voice
- Euroa Gazette
- Shepparton News
- Seymour Telegraph

=== Radio ===
Community radio heard in Nagambie:

- 103.9 - 103.9 FM Seymour-FM (Community Radio for Northern Mitchell Shire & Strathbogie Shire)
- 88.0 - The Range (Country Music)
- 87.6 - TBA

Shepparton radio heard in Nagambie

- 94.5 - Triple J (ABC)
- 95.3 - Triple M (formerly 3SR FM)
- 96.1 - ABC Classic
- 96.9 - HIT Goulburn Valley (formerly STAR FM)
- 97.7 - ABC Goulburn Murray
- 98.5 - ONE FM (Shepparton Community Radio)

=== Television ===
- ABC (plus ABC HD, ABC TV Plus, ABC Kids, ABC Me & ABC News)
- SBS (plus SBS HD, SBS Viceland, SBS World Movies, SBS Food & NITV)
- Seven (plus 7HD, 7TWO, 7mate & 7flix)
- WIN (plus 9HD, 9Gem, 9Go! & 9Life)
- Southern Cross 10 (plus 10 HD, 10 Bold, 10 Peach & 10 Shake)

== Gallery ==
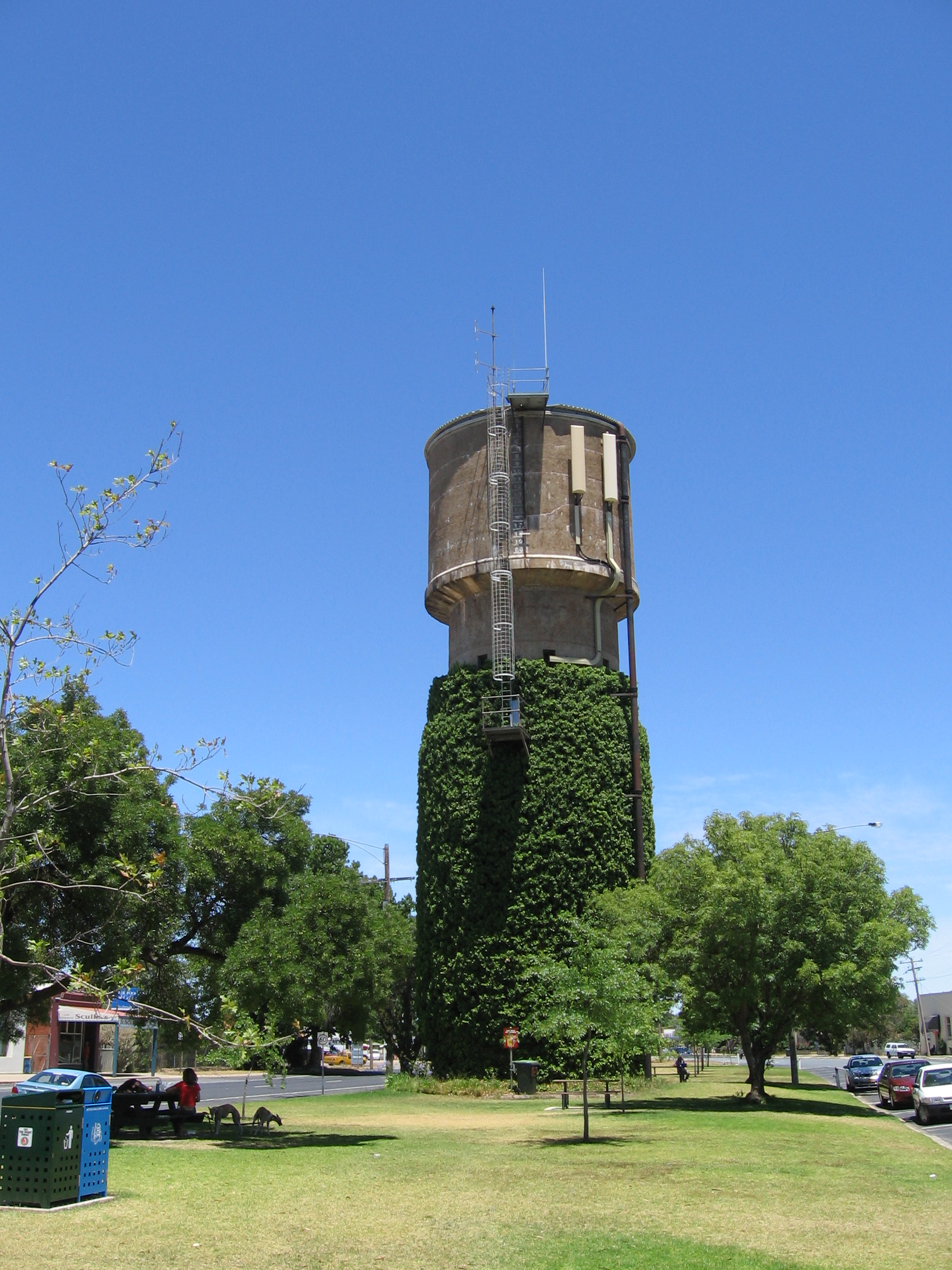
Water tower, 2006

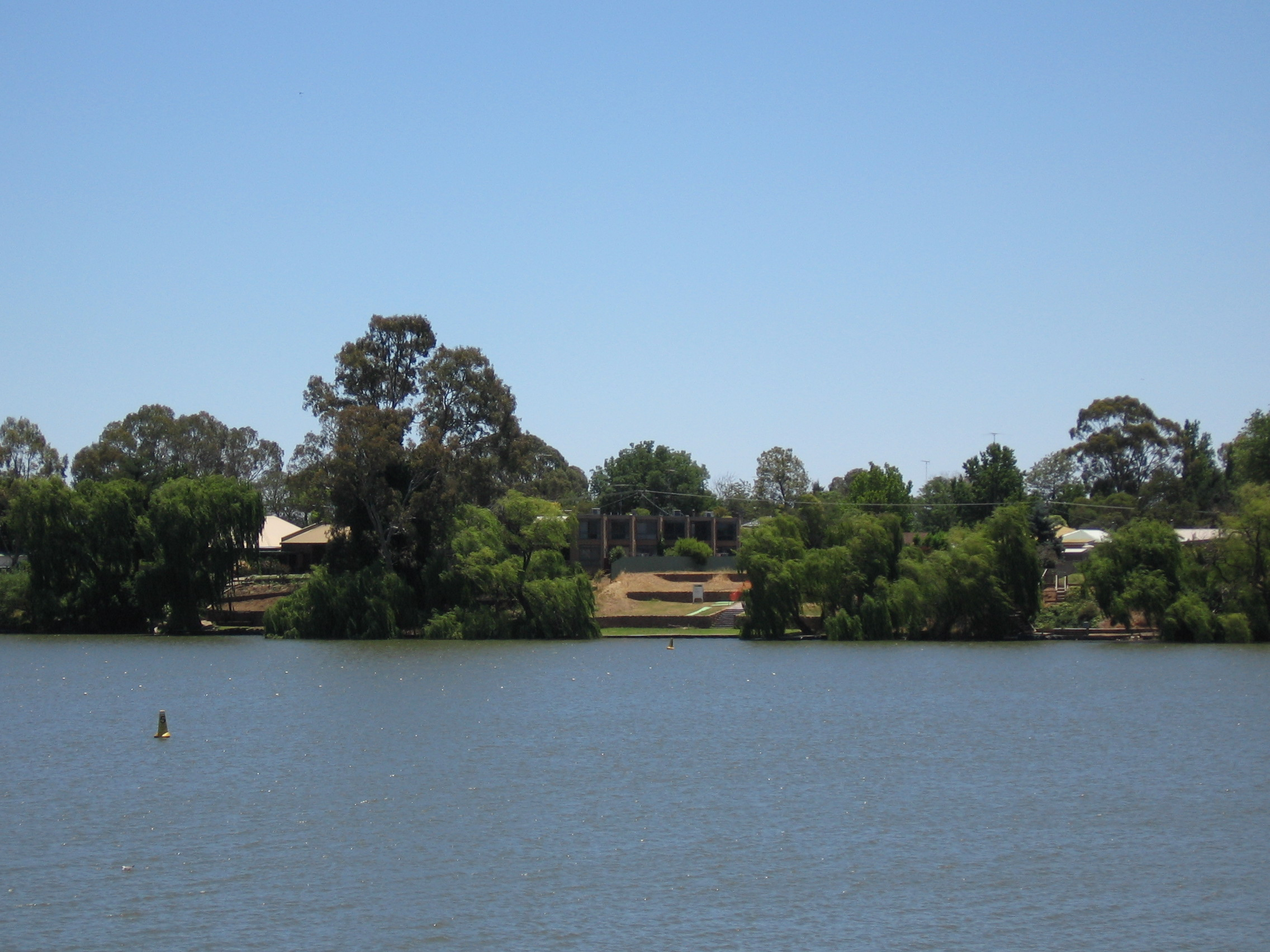
Lake Nagambie, 2006

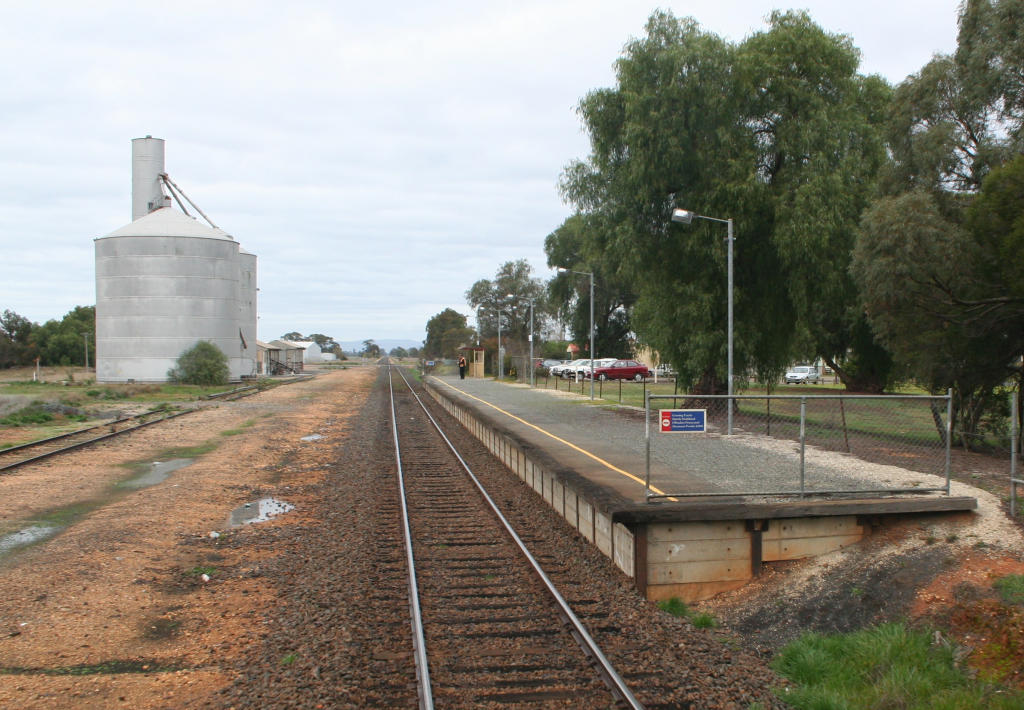
Railway station and goods yard, 2007

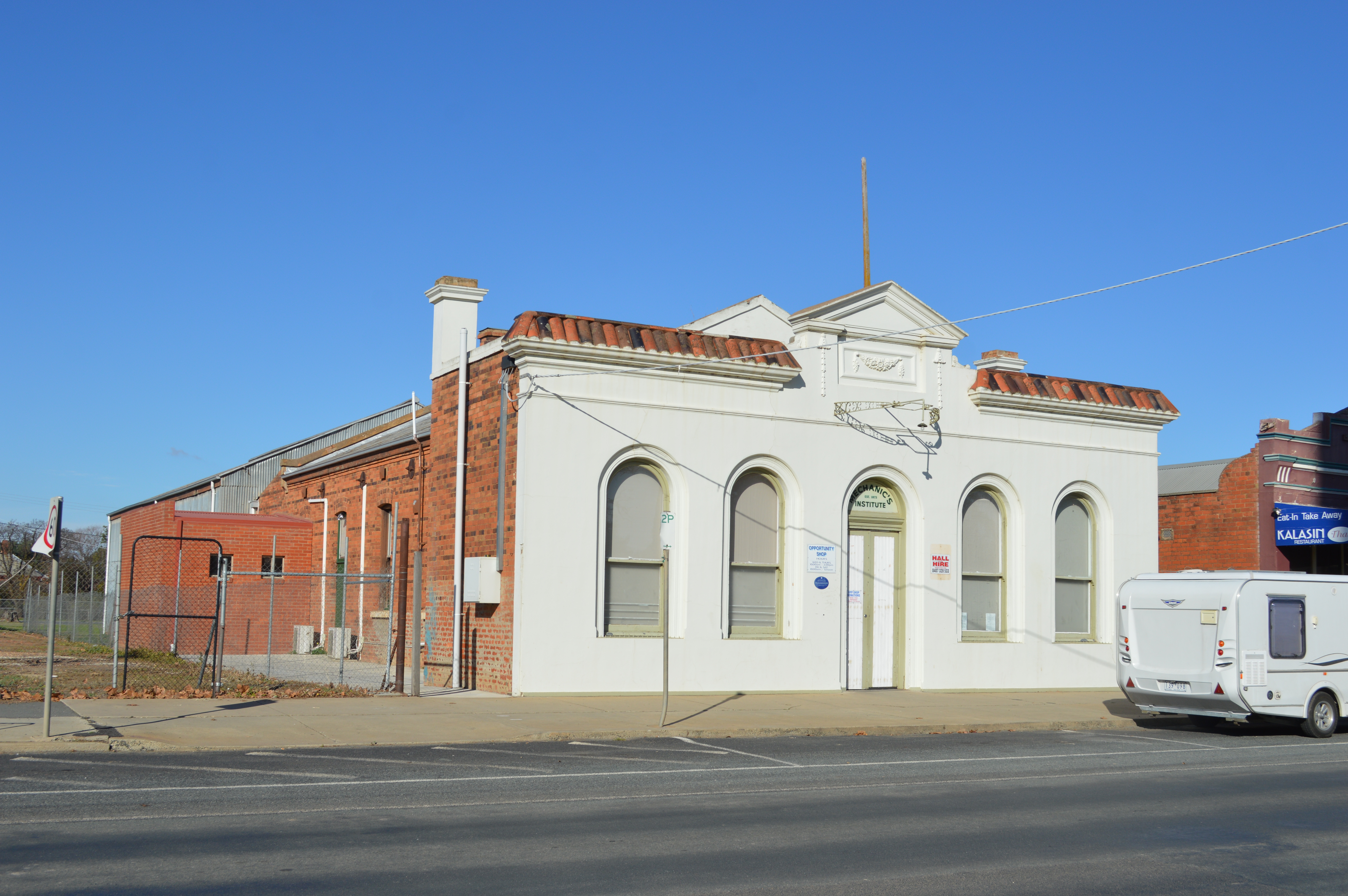
Nagambie Mechanics Institute, 2013

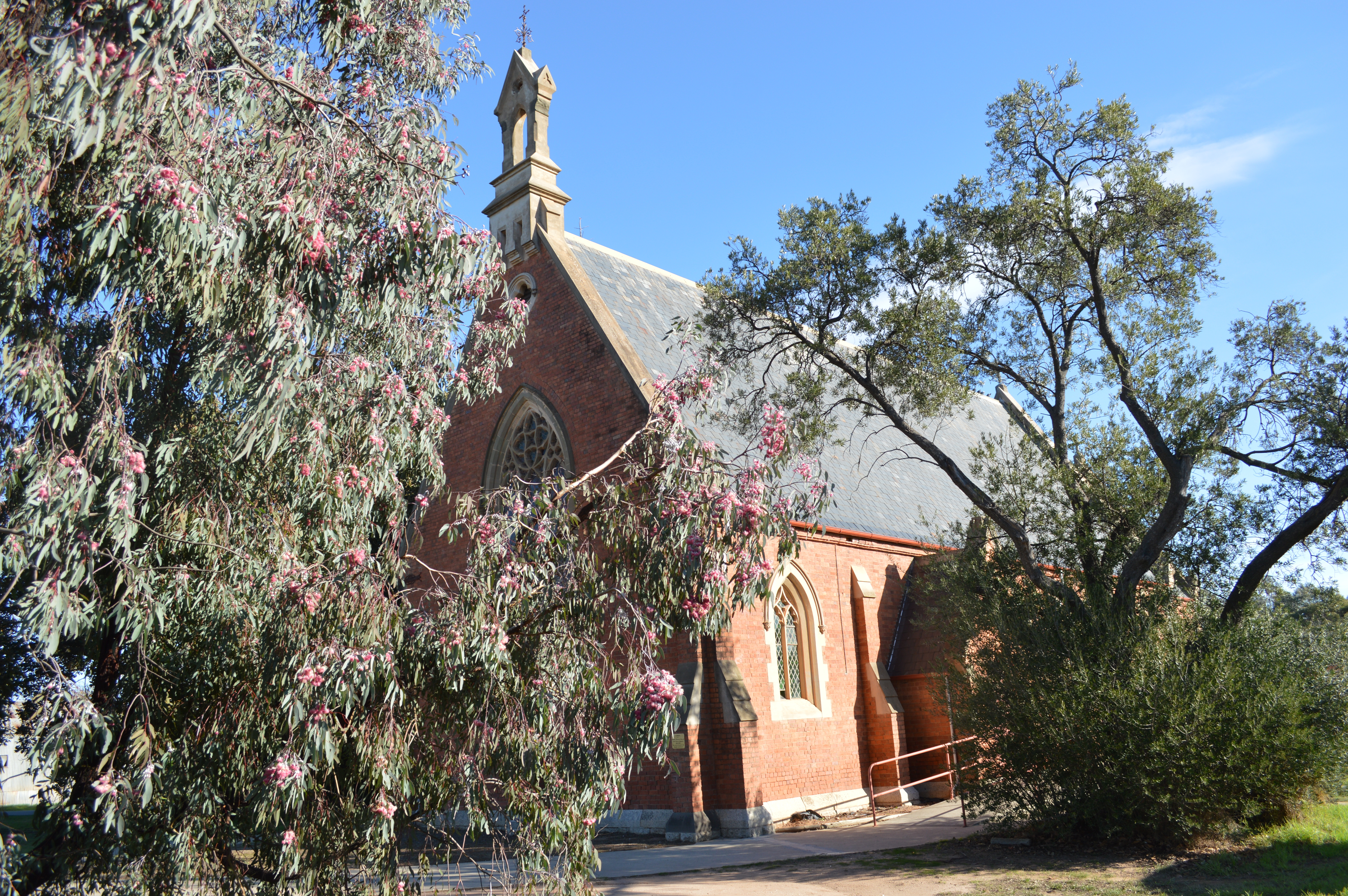
Roman Catholic Church, 2013

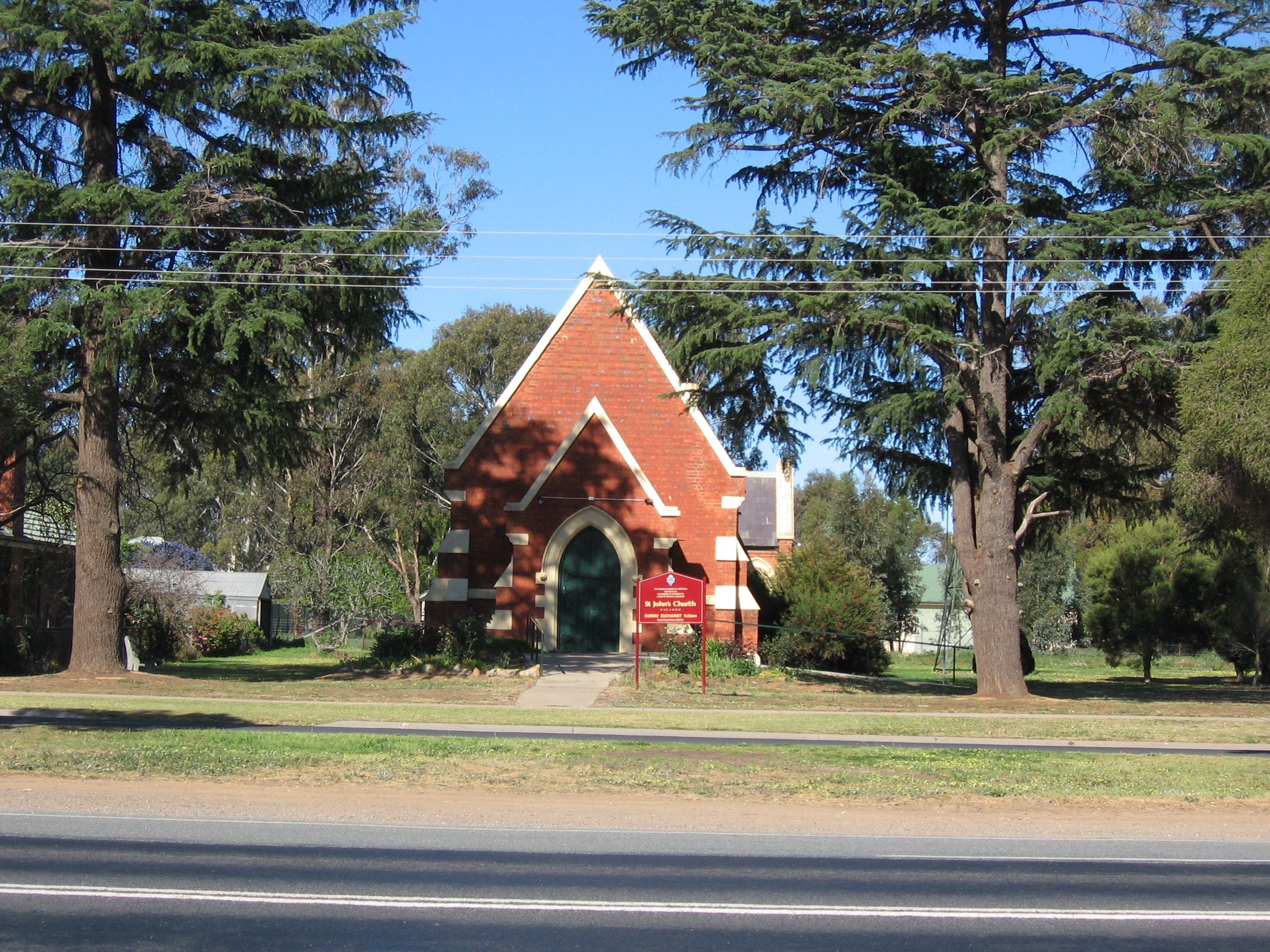
Anglican Church, 2008

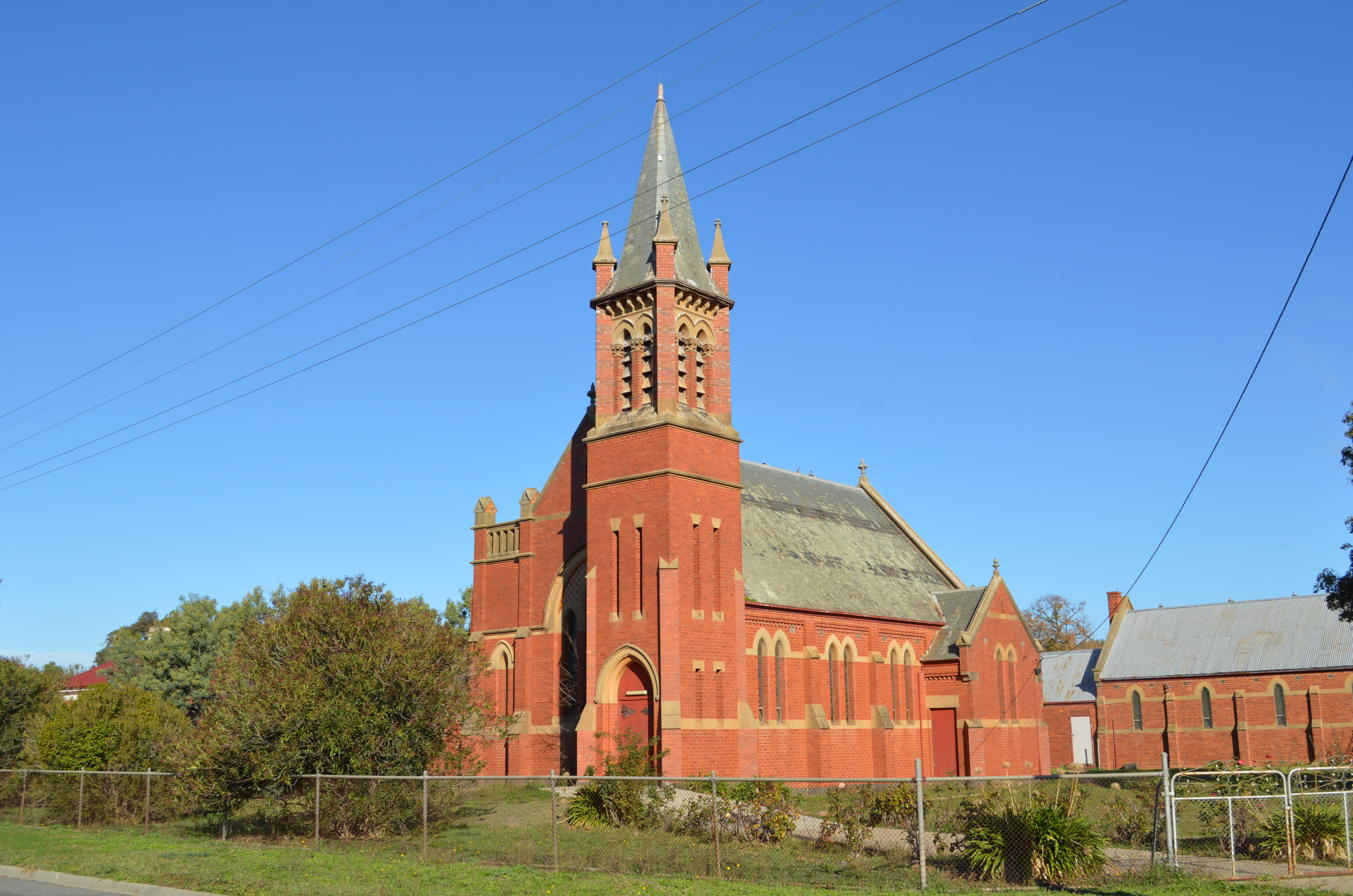
Presbyterian Church, 2013

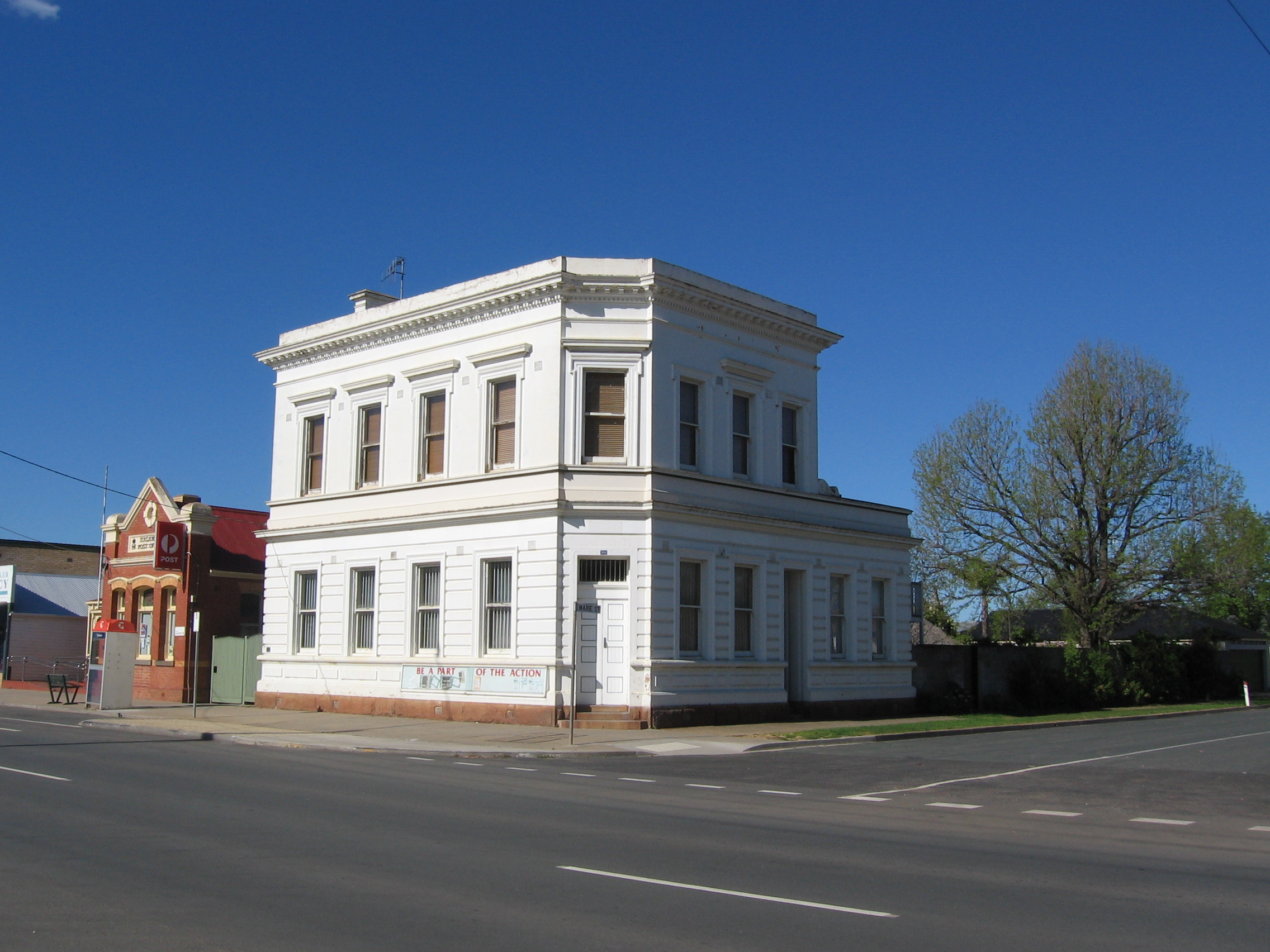
Former bank building, 2008

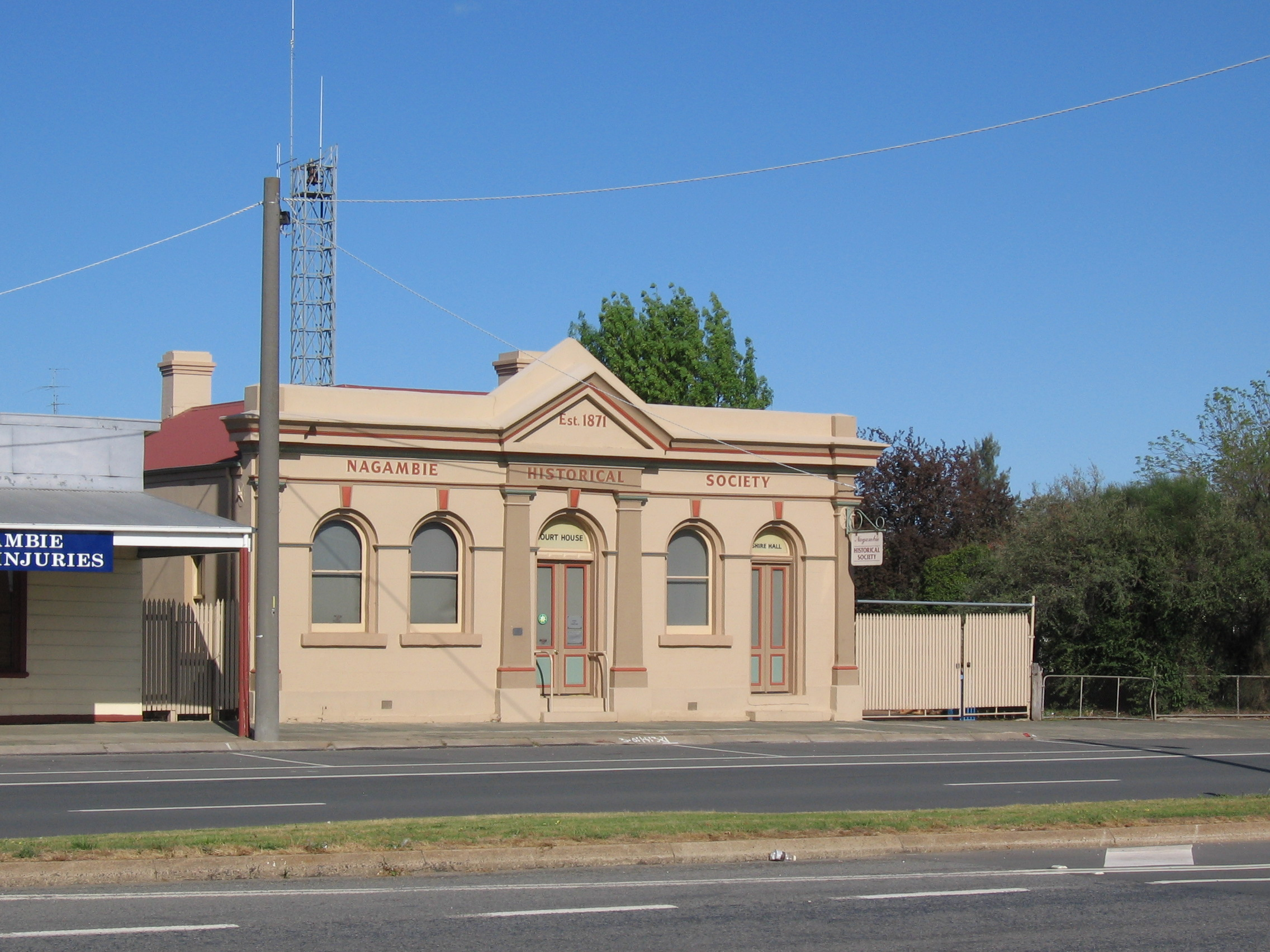
Former Court House, 2008

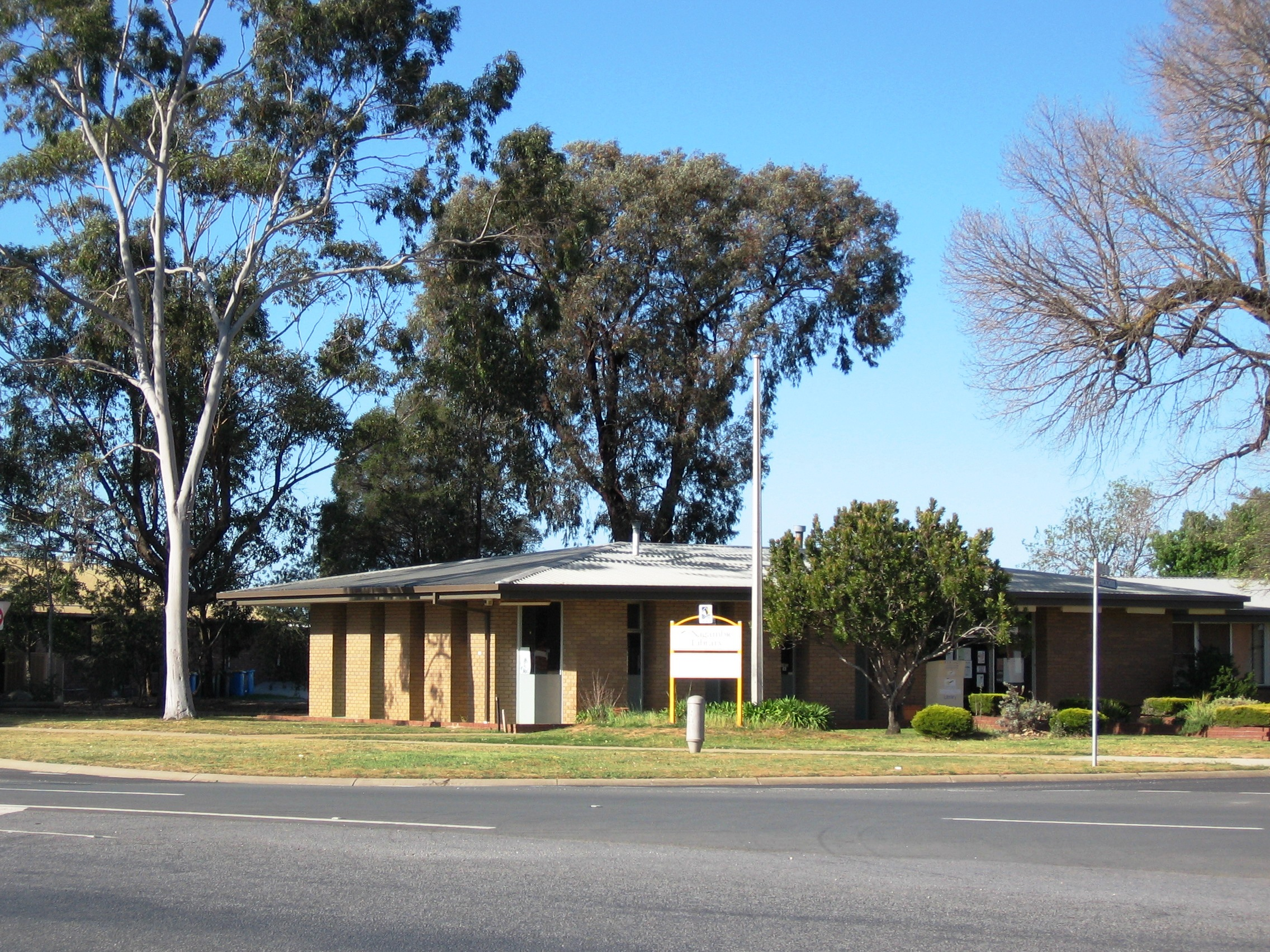
Library, 2008

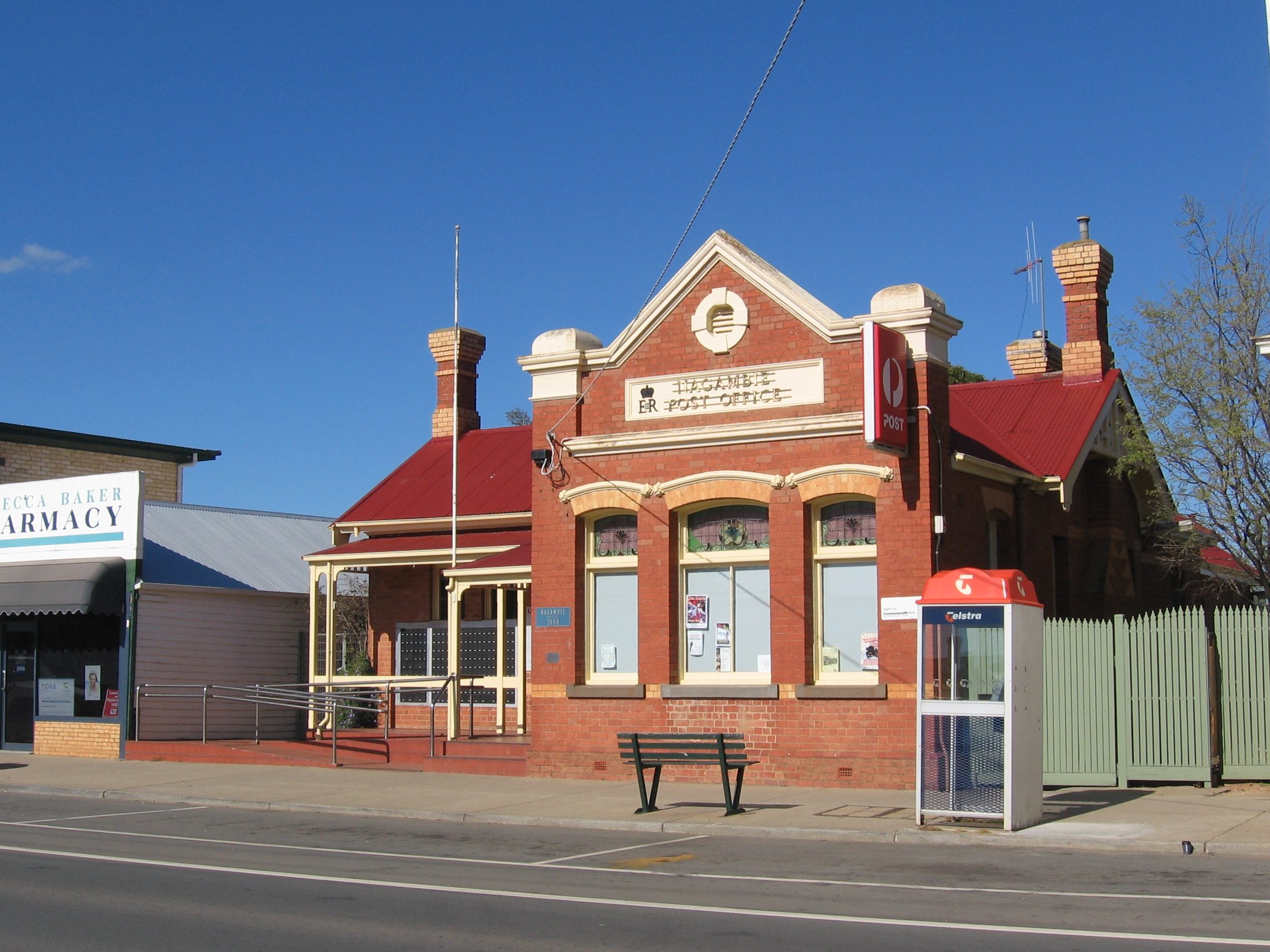
Post Office, 2008
