= Seymour FM =

3SEY FM 103.9
- Seymour, Victoria; Australia
- Broadcast area: North Central Victoria, Australia
- Frequency: 103.9 MHz FM
- Branding: Your Local Station

Programming
- Format: Regional Community Radio

Ownership
- Owner: Seymour Puckapunyal Community Radio Inc

Links
- Website: www.seymourfm.au

Seymour FM is a regional community radio station for the Northern Mitchell and Southern Strathbogie Shires, operating from Seymour township in North Central Victoria, part of the state of Victoria, Australia. The radio station operates on a Long Term Community Broadcasting Licence, transmitting from studios at the Kings Park complex in Seymour.

== History ==
Seymour FM was established in 2001, under the identity SPI FM. The station was originally intended as a local service for Seymour and nearby Puckapunyal. This service was lacking in key skill areas, and failed to attract the interest of listeners or sponsors, and faltered in 2004.

In 2005, a new committee was established to restore a local Seymour based radio service. The new identity of "Seymour FM" was established, and a series of new presenters commenced programs, along with promotions activity with the revised name and image.

Early in 2009, the radio station management took steps to further the radio station objectives to relaunch, and formally apply for a high-power full-service community broadcasting licence.

The radio station in its bid for a full-time permanent licence has proven its ability to successfully operate a long-term community broadcasting service, and has had in this time relocated twice from the former Wimble Street ("Bomb Site") studios to Emily Street and finally to the King's Park complex.

The radio station's outlook has widened, with original intent to simply cover Seymour and Puckapunyal, the radio station has now the established long-term goal to reach the Northern Mitchell Shire and the Strathbogie Shire. This includes the townships of Seymour, Avenel, Nagambie, Broadford, Pyalong, Tallarook and Euroa. With the long anticipated new transmission facility and increased transmission power granted to the radio station, these areas will be expected to receive excellent coverage and signal strength.

The radio station is also more commonly identifying as "103.9 FM", with a reducing emphasis on the words "Seymour FM", as part of the transition to being a higher powered multi township community radio station.

Previous logo until March 2012

== Community radio for the Northern Mitchell Shire & Strathbogie Shire ==
The proposed new higher power transmission would cover the northern Mitchell Shire and the Strathbogie Shire, in the state of Victoria. This is the area north of the Great Divide. The southern half of the shire is served by Melbourne radio stations; however, the availability of media north of the 'Great Divide' is severely limited, with only scratchy reception from Shepparton (ONE-FM) and Alexandra (UG-FM) based community radio, and the two Shepparton based commercial stations, and ABC.

With the limitation of available media choices in the region, the radio station has adopted the "Northern Mitchell Shire and Strathbogie Shire" as the registered geographic coverage area for its proposed higher power community radio service.

Additional coverage into the Strathbogie shire will permit coverage into neighbouring towns such as Avenel and Nagambie with future coverage extending to Euroa and Violet Town.

It is anticipated that the station will modify its identity from the present "Seymour FM" upon the change over to the higher powered TCBL service, to be inclusive of towns within the widened coverage area.

The southern section of the Mitchell Shire (including towns such as Kilmore & Wallan) is within the ACMA Melbourne Radio Zone, and is subject to Metropolitan frequency planning. The number of FM radio services in Melbourne exceed 30 and frequencies are unavailable for new services anywhere in the Melbourne Radio Zone. Therefore, Seymour FM has established the northern Mitchell Shire (and part of the Strathbogie Shire) as its designated service area.

== Transmitter site ==
The transmitter site provides for coverage to areas including Seymour, Broadford, Avenel, Nagambie, Longwood, Murchison, and southward to Kilmore and Heathcote. The new transmitter site provides the capacity for 4KW output. Previously the transmitter was located in the Seymour township (Emily Street) with coverage limited to Seymour, Tallarook and Puckapunyal. These localities continue to receive good coverage from the new site.

== Programs ==
Seymour FM 103.9 presents a wider number and variety of new programs, including a number of specialist music, community organisation based and sports programs. Programs provide a mix of music and spoken word genre, presented by people resident throughout the coverage area. The program listing is available from the website: Seymour FM Programs

== Emergency situation broadcasting ==
Seymour FM is establishing relationships with the emergency services, mainly the CFA (Country Fire Authority) to provide local information at a time of bushfire. This is also to be promoted as part of the radio station's key local responsibilities.

Recent participation in regional emergency broadcasting was in association with neighbouring UG FM, in coverage of the Highlands Grassfire, a fire that burnt its way through over 1800 hectares of local grassland and bush. With wider coverage via a high powered transmitter, the radio station is seeking to become an emergency broadcaster in its own right.

Members from the local community are being encouraged by the management of Seymour FM to participate in emergency broadcast training, and through local council and state government to secure funding for key broadcast linking facilities for use in time of emergency situations.

== Sport ==
Sports coverage includes the Country basketball League matches including the Seymour Blasters basketball team, and coverage of the Goulburn Valley and Kyabram Districts Football Leagues matches featuring the Seymour Avenel and Nagambie teams. Coverage includes home and away fixtures for both competitions.
