= Puckapunyal =

- Town
- Sign at entry

- Interactive map of Puckapunyal
- Coordinates: 37°00′S 145°02′E
- Country: Australia
- State: Victoria
- Region: Hume
- LGA: Shire of Mitchell

Government
  - State electorate: Euroa
  - Federal division: Nicholls

Population
  - Total: 1,108 (2021 census)
- Postcode: 3662
Localities around Puckapunyal
Moormbool West	Graytown	Mitchellstown
Heathcote	Puckapunyal	Northwood
Tooborac	Glenaroua	Hilldene

Puckapunyal (more formally the Puckapunyal Military Area, but also known as the Puckapunyal Camp or Puckapunyal Army Base, and colloquially as "Pucka") is an Australian Army training facility and base 10 km west of Seymour, in central Victoria, south-eastern Australia.

== Description ==
Puckapunyal is a small restricted-access town inhabited mainly by about 280 families of the Australian Defence Force community, with an associated area of about 400 km^{2} of bushland and former pasture used for field training exercises. It is home to the Australian Army's School of Armour, the School of Artillery and the School of Transport, along with the Combined Arms Training Centre, the Joint Logistics Unit, and two transport squadrons. The Royal Australian Armoured Corps Memorial and Army Tank Museum is on the base's grounds, and the facilities are used by the Victorian Australian Army Cadets Brigade. Apart from the military education and training venues, most accommodation consists of single-storey brick houses with backyards. It contains a primary school, shops, a variety of sporting facilities, and a theatre.

== History ==
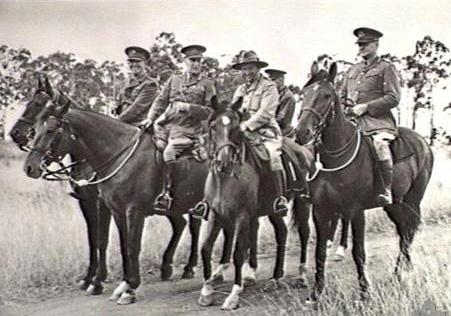
Senior officers on horseback at Puckapunyal in 1940

M3 Grant tanks, Armoured division, Puckapunyal Army Base, Victoria, Australia, 1942

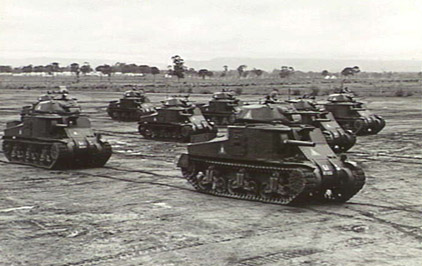
M3 Grants of the 1st Armoured Division at Puckapunyal, June 1942

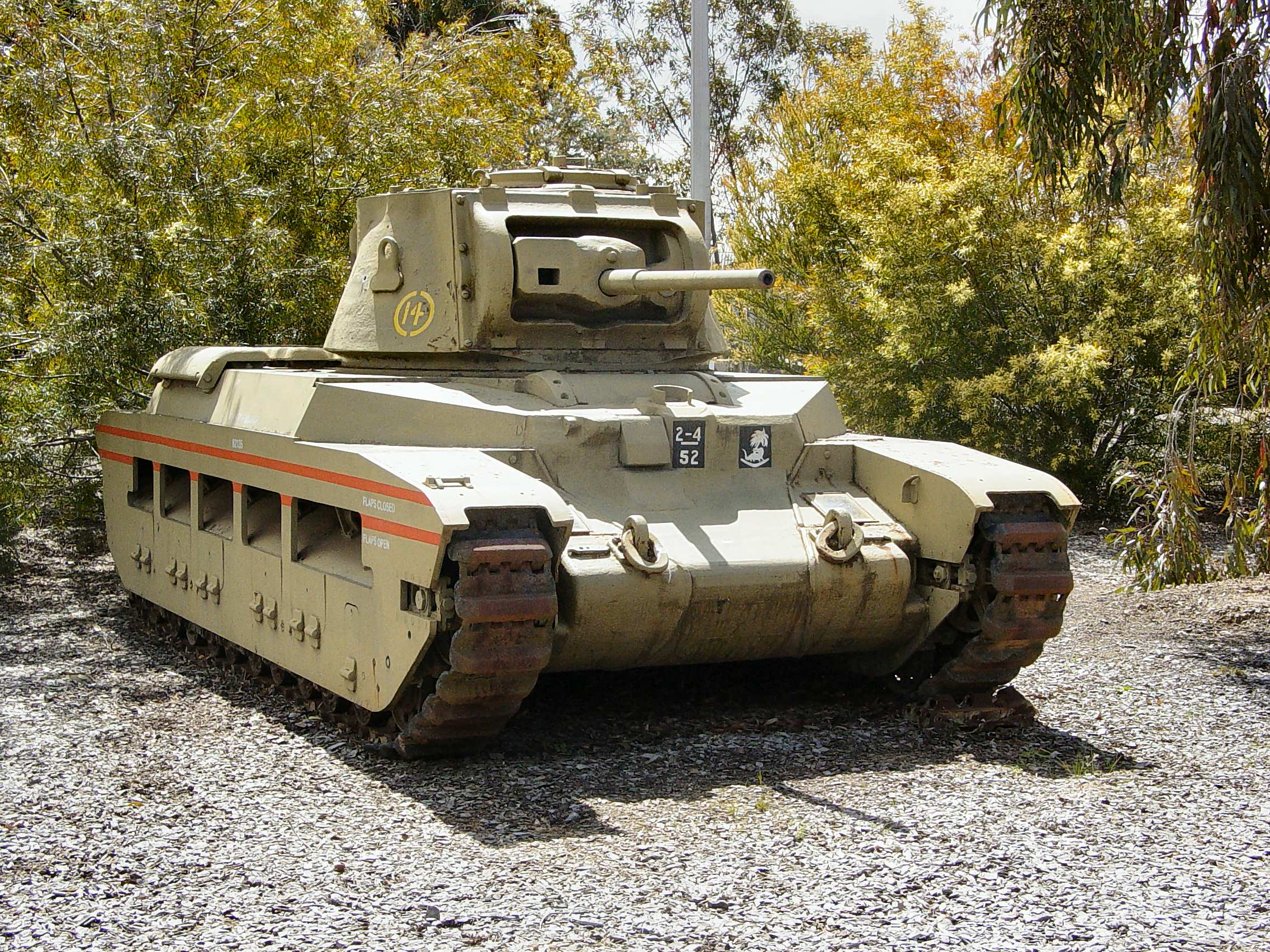
A Matilda II tank at the Puckapunyal Tank Museum

=== Military use ===
The area was first used as a mobilisation and training area during World War I. During the early 1920s, an ordnance store and rifle range were built on the site. In 1939, the area was formally established as Puckapunyal Camp: the name was taken from the Aboriginal name for a large hill within the training area, which has been variously translated as "death to the eagle", "the outer barbarians", "the middle hill", "place of exile", and "valley of the winds". The base was used to train the Second Australian Imperial Force, as other Army establishments were at capacity training Militia units. The original site was too small for wartime training, and an additional 5,700 hectares (14,000 acres) were acquired. As well as Australian units, the United States Army's 41st Infantry Division trained at Puckapunyal.

In 1949, the 1st Armoured Regiment was raised at Puckapunyal. The regiment remained based at Puckapunyal until it relocated to Darwin in June 1995.

During the 1950s, Puckapunyal was host to the 3rd National Service Training Brigade (see National Service Act 1951). During the Vietnam War, national servicemen conscripted under the National Service Act 1964 outside of Queensland and New South Wales were sent to Puckapunyal (soldiers from these states trained at Kapooka or Singleton). They were trained by the 2nd Recruit Training Battalion, with up to 4,000 soldiers at Puckapunyal at any given time.

By 1988, subsequent land acquisitions had increased the training area to 39,290 hectares (97,100 acres).

The National Service barracks were transferred to the Third Training Group in the 1980s to provide recruit and promotion training for General Reserve soldiers and also promotion training for Reserve Officers attending the Reserve Command and Staff College. This continued until the closure of the Training Group in June 2000.

During 1999 and 2000, citizens from Kosovo were housed in the Training Group barracks (as well as at other military barracks around the country) as part of a temporary protection program called Operation Safe Haven in support of the NATO activity in the province. They returned to Kosovo once the situation there had stabilized.

It serves as a testing ground for armoured fighting vehicles.

=== Puckapunyal Restoration and Conservation Project ===
In the 1970s and 1980s, the Army undertook a land rehabilitation program, as decades of heavy use had caused major land degradation. At the time, it was "one of the largest single landscape revegetation operations yet attempted in Australia and perhaps anywhere." Wilkie summarises the project as follows:

Historical land use impacts and heavy military usage, with little attention paid to land management or maintenance, eventually left the area barren and denuded. Although attempts at revegetation occurred in the 1950s, by the 1960s parts of the site were impassable because of waterlogging and severe erosion. For the tanks of the armored division, these areas were unsafe and unusable. One newspaper described it as the “most desolate and barren military camp in Victoria.”

By 1969, the Army was faced with two alternatives: “(1) to rehabilitate the area, or (2) to abandon it with consequent loss of facilities and the certainty of having to face similar problems elsewhere in the future.” The former option was taken. The Puckapunyal Restoration and Conservation Project began work in 1971. Officially operating under the auspices of Defence, the research and scientific support for the project was provided by the Commonwealth Scientific and Industrial Research Organisation (CSIRO), while the Victorian Soil Conservation Authority managed operations and provided its expertise in soil erosion and land restoration.

By 1985, the extensive program of earthworks, soil and water erosion control, and revegetation had been completed on 20,000 hectares of land. Some 5,000 hectares of barren and denuded landscape was repaired, and 16,000 hectares of improved pasture had been established. At the completion of the project, land management and scientific officers were appointed to continually monitor and research the Puckapunyal site. A rest and restore program was implemented, creating “no go” areas where the land was overused, where new vegetation was establishing itself or was otherwise sensitive to environmental changes, or where research was being conducted.

Elsewhere, Wilkie has argued that "Although conservation programmes emphasised utility for defence requirements, the restoration project of the 1970s and 1980s had, in reality, reimagined Puckapunyal as both a military training area and a natural landscape for vegetation and habitat for animals ... the restoration project appears to have been a net benefit to native animal populations, providing habitat and sanctuary for various species that are endemic to the grassy woodlands that have otherwise not been well protected under traditional conservation models ... Puckapunyal provided a testing ground for defence approaches to animal conservation that continue to develop to this day."

== Environment ==
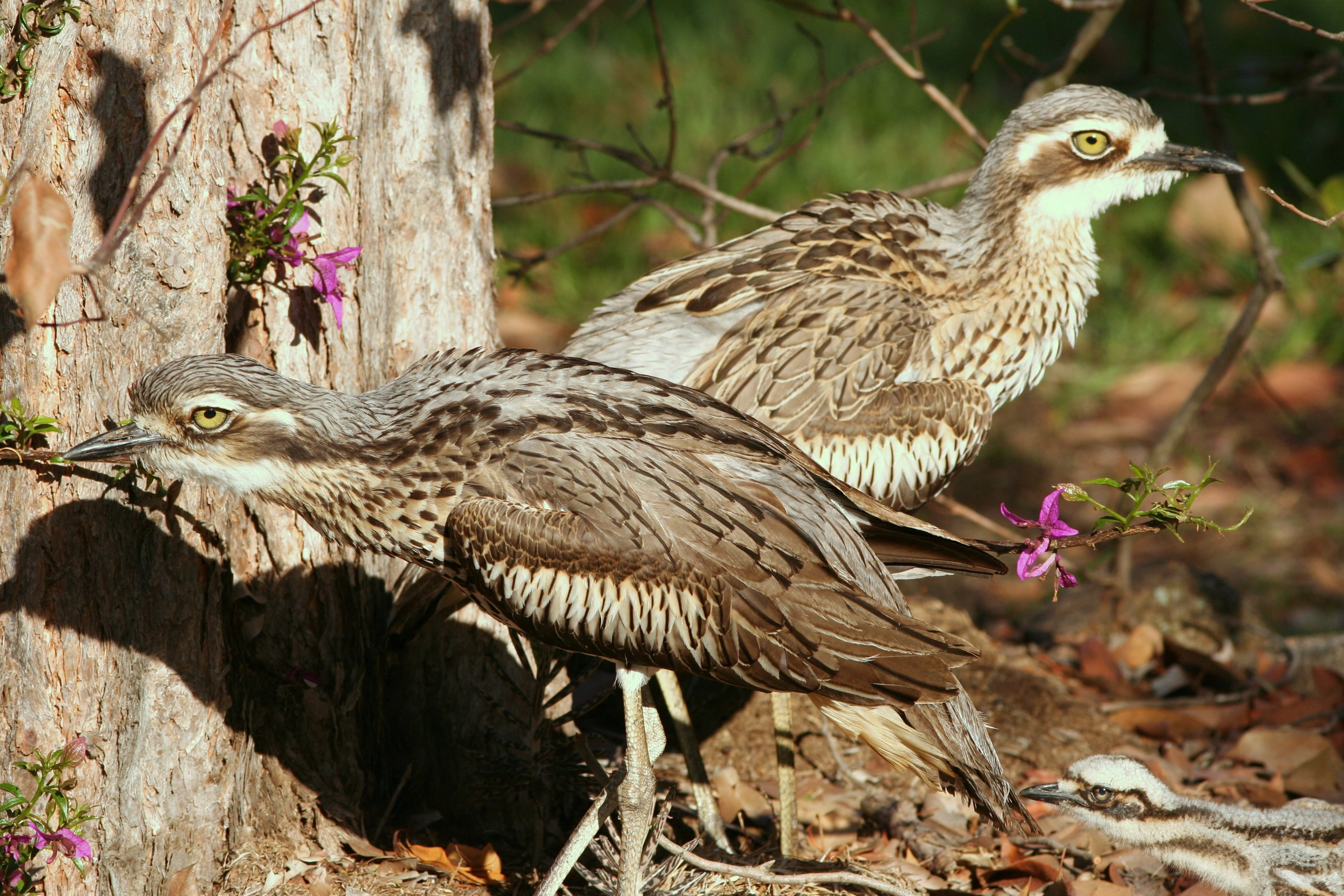
Puckapunyal is a stronghold of bush stone-curlews in Victoria.

The Puckapunyal Military Area (PMA) experiences cool to cold winters, when most of the average annual rainfall of 596 mm occurs, and dry, warm to hot, summers. The site is characterised by a series of rocky hills and ridges trending north to south, with the highest parts around Mount Puckapunyal (413 m) and Mount Kappe (384 m). The soils are mainly duplex, having low natural fertility and water holding capacity, with smaller areas of deep alluvium. Surface drainage is oriented towards the north and north east, with surface runoff flowing into the Goulburn River. All streams in the PMA are seasonal.

=== Flora and fauna ===
The PMA contains box-ironbark forest that forms one of the largest discrete remnants of this threatened ecosystem in Victoria. Some 706 species of vascular, and 170 of non-vascular, plant have been recorded. Two species, clover glycine and trailing hop-bush, are nationally threatened. Records have been made of 44 mammals, 18 reptiles, 12 frogs, 11 fish and over 140 invertebrates.

==== Birds ====
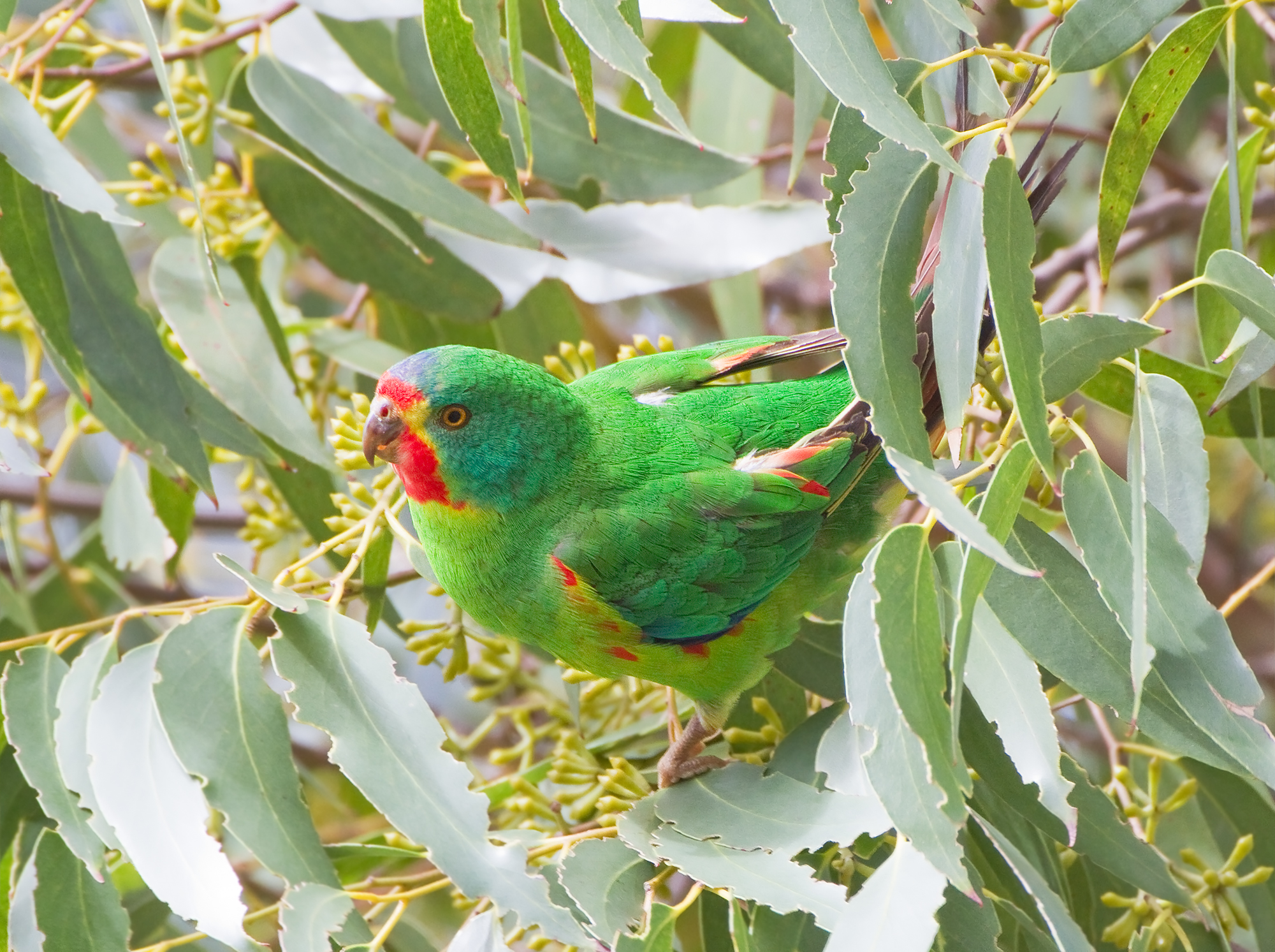
Puckapunyal's box-ironbark forest is an important site for swift parrots

The entire PMA, along with two small reserves and an army munitions storage site at nearby Mangalore, has been identified by BirdLife International as a 435 km^{2} Important Bird Area (IBA) because it supports the largest known population of bush stone-curlews in Victoria. It is also regularly visited by endangered swift parrots, often in large numbers. Diamond firetails are common residents. Other significant birds recorded from the site (out of a total of 207 species) are regent and painted honeyeaters, flame and pink robins, Australasian and black-backed bitterns, powerful and barking owls, and white-throated and spotted nightjars.

== In popular culture ==
Puckapunyal is mentioned in the song "I Was Only 19", the No. 1 single by Redgum from the 1983 album Caught in the Act. It is also mentioned in episode 84 of the TV series Prisoner (alternatively known as Prisoner: Cell Block H).
