= Tahbilk =

Winery in Victoria, Australia

Coordinates: 36°49′35″S 145°5′10″E

Tahbilk Winery
- Location: Shire of Strathbogie, Victoria, Australia
- Wine region: Nagambie Lakes, Goulburn Valley
- Formerly: Chateau Tahbilk
- Other labels: Tahbilk, Dalfarras
- Founded: 1860
- First vines planted: 1860
- Key people: Alister Purbrick
- Known for: Marsanne
- Varietals: Marsanne, Viognier, Sauvignon blanc, Shiraz, Cabernet Sauvignon, Merlot, Cabernet Franc, Chardonnay, Riesling, Semillon, Sauvignon blanc, Verdelho, Grenache, Mourvedre, Roussanne
- Other attractions: Wetlands Cafe, Wetlands & Wildlife Reserve, Dalfarras Wines
- Website: www.tahbilk.com.au

Tahbilk Winery is a historic Australian winery with National Trust certification. It is located 120 km (75 miles) north of Melbourne between the townships of Seymour and Nagambie in the Nagambie Lakes a sub region of Goulburn Valley Wine Region. It was established in 1860, and is the oldest family-owned winery and vineyard in Victoria. In 2022 it was ranked the eighteenth largest Australian wine company by production, and the tenth largest in terms of total revenue. The winery is part of Australia's First Families of Wine, a prominent Australian wine alliance.

== History ==
In 1856, Hugh Glass became the owner of the Goulburn River property that included the future Tahbilk. Rushworth storekeeper Ludovic Marie convinced Glass the land was suitable for viticulture and took over 258 acres (104 ha) of the property for a proposed vineyard and winery. Marie engaged his friend Richard Henry Horne, who had invested in blocks of land at nearby Murchison on the Goulburn River. Horne was eager to "promote any venture which might bring prosperity to the district" and agreed to participate in the winery plan. The two set up a public company, the Goulburn Vineyard Proprietary, with Marie as manager and Horne as honorary secretary.

In 1859, the company advertised for capital of £30,000 in £5 shares. Its provisional committee comprised Horne, J.G. Dougharty of Melbourne and N.R.D. Bond and A. Sinclair of Murchison. The advertisement said:

The position of the land, the quality of the soil, the proximity of the water, make the property the most desirable spot which could be selected for vine growing. The quantity of grapes produced by the few stocks of vine in the garden and at the house, is an indubitable proof of the capabilities of the ground.

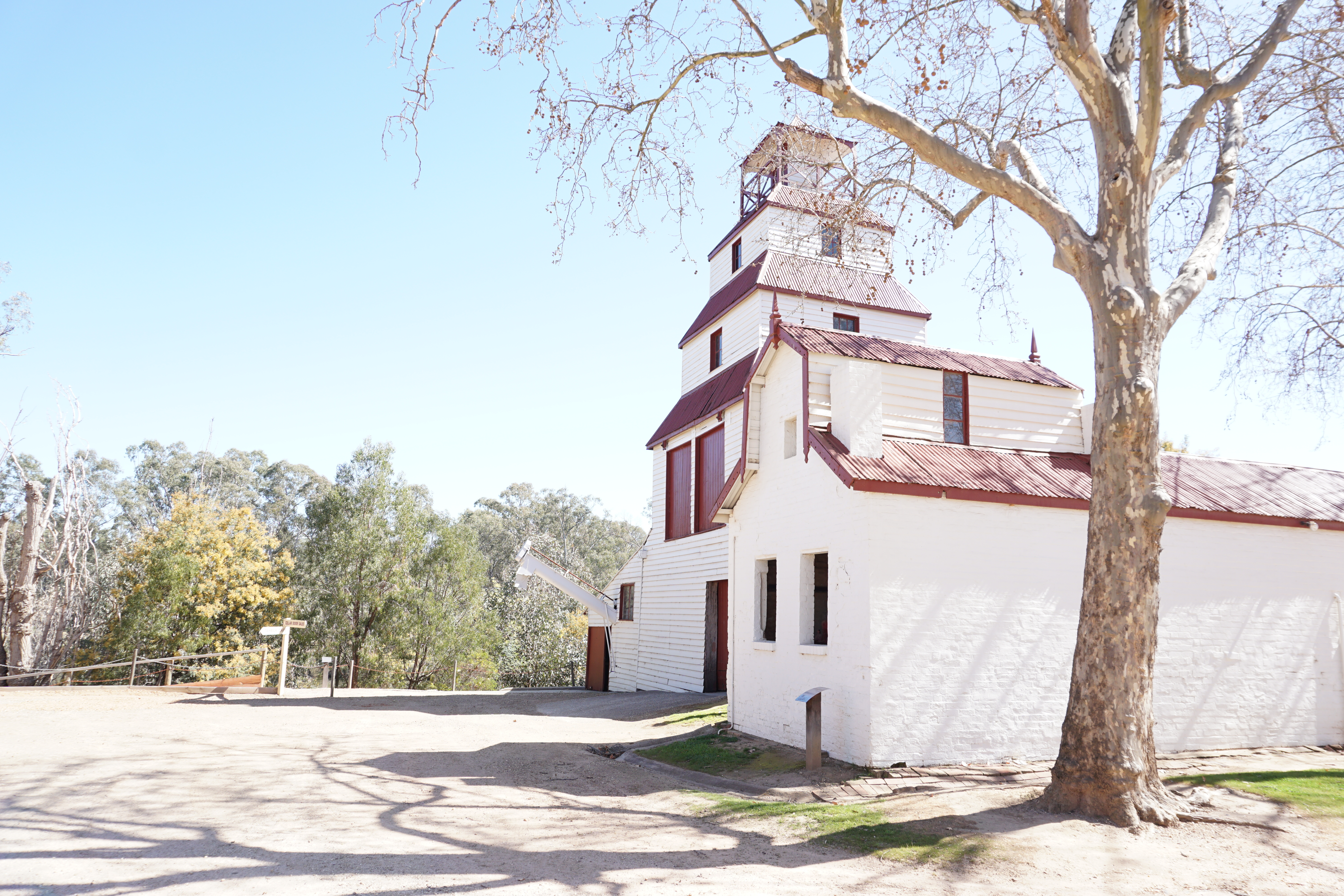
Tahbilk Tower

In August 1860, the company was called Tahbilk Vineyard Proprietary, with Ludovic Marie as Principal Vigneron and Charles Ebden and James Blackwood as trustees. The provisional directory, in addition to Horne and Bond, comprised Richard Eades, John Pinney Bear, David Wilkie, George Holmes, Hugh Glass, Samuel Rentsch, G.S. Evans, J.W. Mackenna, J.H. Brooke and Donald Kennedy. They included three Members of the Legislative Assembly, two Members of the Legislative Council, two Justices of the Peace, the Swiss Consul, the Argentinian Consul-General and the Mayor of Melbourne.

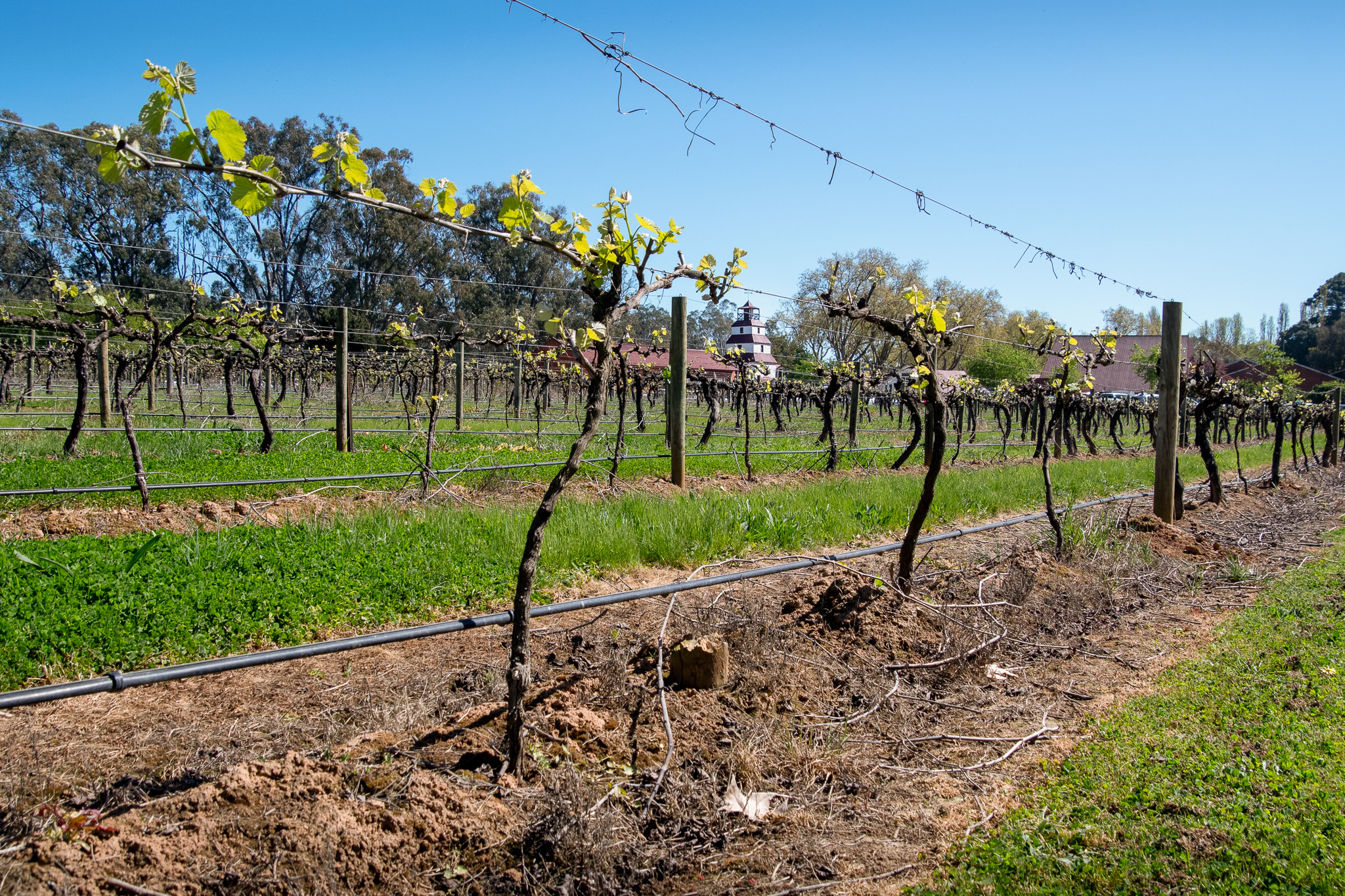
Grape vines in the vineyard at Tabilk

Marie addressed a dinner of vineyard workers in 1861; he said, "the money for all these extensive operations which were being carried on was found almost solely by three gentlemen... Messrs. Bear, Glass and Holmes". In May 1860, one the company's founders, Sinclair, was found dead in Brighton from an overdose of morphine administered by persons unknown, with "a list of shareholders in the Goulburn Vineyard Company ... found sewn up in the pocket" of his coat. One of the last men to see Sinclair alive was Ludovic Marie, who was declared insolvent in August 1861. The venture did not compensate Horne for the money he had lost in the early public float, and he returned to England but later said he was "the father of the Australian wine industry".

When Marie left the company, John Pinney Bear assumed control and progressively bought out the other shareholders; by 1876 he was sole owner. By that year, Tahblik's annual vintage output was around 31,500 litres (6,900 imp gal) and was winning national and international awards. Bear employed François De Coueslant as manager in 1877, who is credited with planting the estates' mulberry trees and building the winery tower. A year later The Argus reported that Tahbilk had received a wine order from Queen Victoria.

In 1889 Bear, a former Member of the Victorian Legislative Council, died at Tahbilk. De Coueslant had left in 1886, and Chateau Tahbilk as it was known went into decline, with the vineyard shrinking to 46 ha (110 acres) by 1925. It was purchased by the Purbrick family in 1931 and remains in their ownership.

Until 2000, the winery was known as Chateau Tahbilk. The original cellars built in the 1860s and 1870s are still in use. These and the vineyard's buildings are classified by the National Trust of Australia.

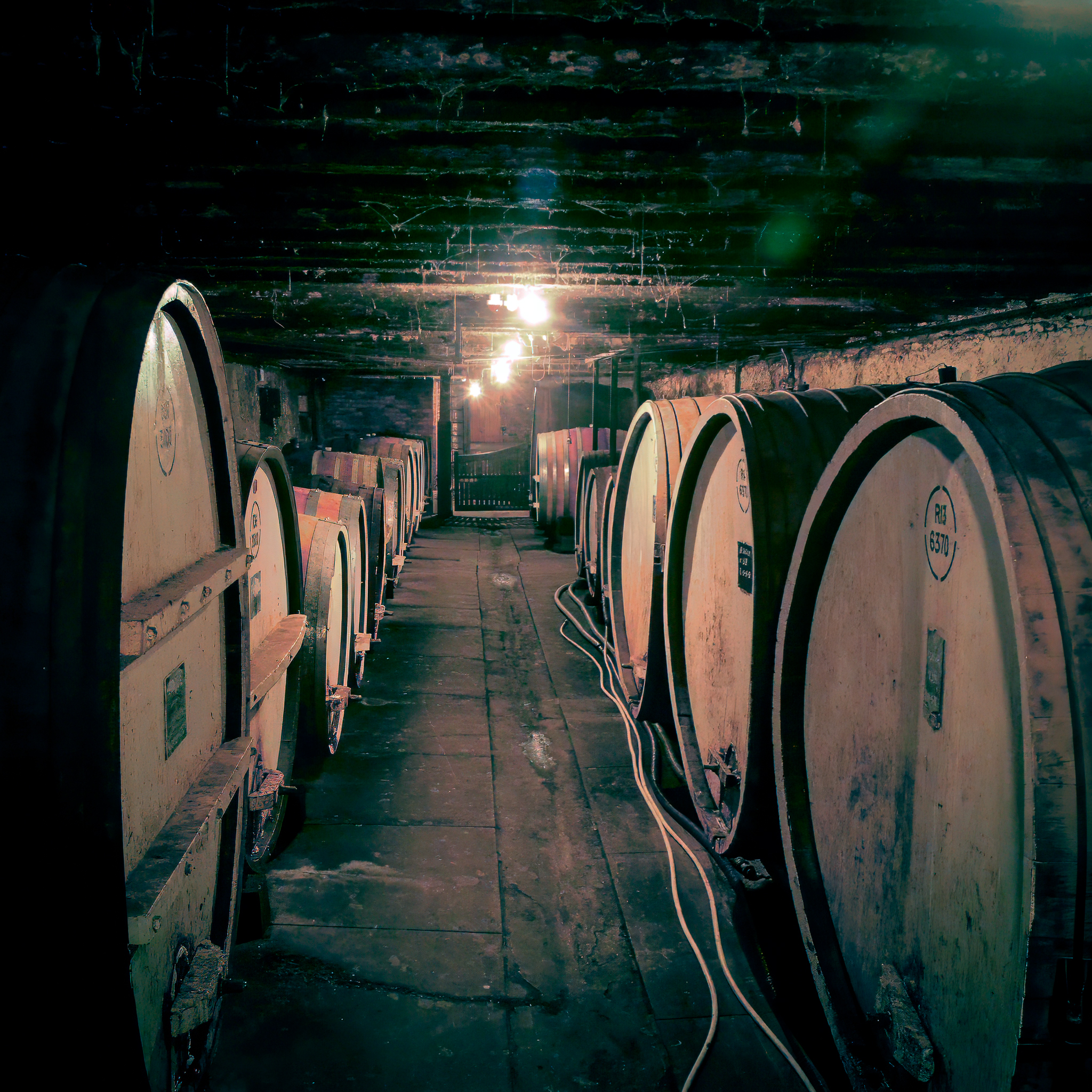
The underground wine cellar and wooden wine barrels at the Tahbilk Winery, Victoria, Australia.

=== Claims ===
Tahbilk, founded in 1860, claims to be the oldest family-owned winery in Victoria. Other wineries predate Tahbilk's origins, for example Chambers Rosewood Winery and Gehrig Estate Wines in Rutherglen founded in 1858, and Morris Wines, also in Rutherglen, was founded in 1859. However, none of these wineries have had the continuous family ownership of Tahbilk. Tahbilk claims to have the largest single holding of Marsanne grapevines in the world. The first vines were cuttings made in the 1860s from the St Huberts Winery in the Yarra Valley. Tahbilk's current plantings of Marsanne date from 1927.

== Etymology ==
The name Tahbilk originates from the winery's location, which the local aboriginal people first referred to as "tabilk-tabilk", meaning "place of many waterholes". Originally spelled Tabilk, the 'h' was added later by the winery in hopes of improving business in Europe.

== Winery ==
The winery specialises in the Rhone grape varietals of Marsanne, Viognier and Roussanne, and also produces Shiraz, Cabernet Sauvignon, Merlot, Cabernet Franc, Chardonnay, Riesling, Semillon, Sauvignon blanc, Verdelho, Grenache and Mourvedre grapes. Some original pre-phylloxera Shiraz vines survive from 1860. Tahbilk is part of the Australian wine alliance Australia's First Families of Wine. First Families' chairman is the Tahbilk chief executive Alister Purbrick. The company also owns Dalfarras Wines, Tahbilk Wetlands Cafe, and Tahbilk Wetlands and Wild Life Reserve.

== Awards ==
Tahbilk wines have won awards including the Diploma of Honour, the highest award obtainable at the Greater London Exhibition of 1899. Tahbilk was the National Winner in the Parks, Gardens and the Environment Category of the Best of Wine Tourism Awards 2007.

== Wetlands and wildlife reserve ==
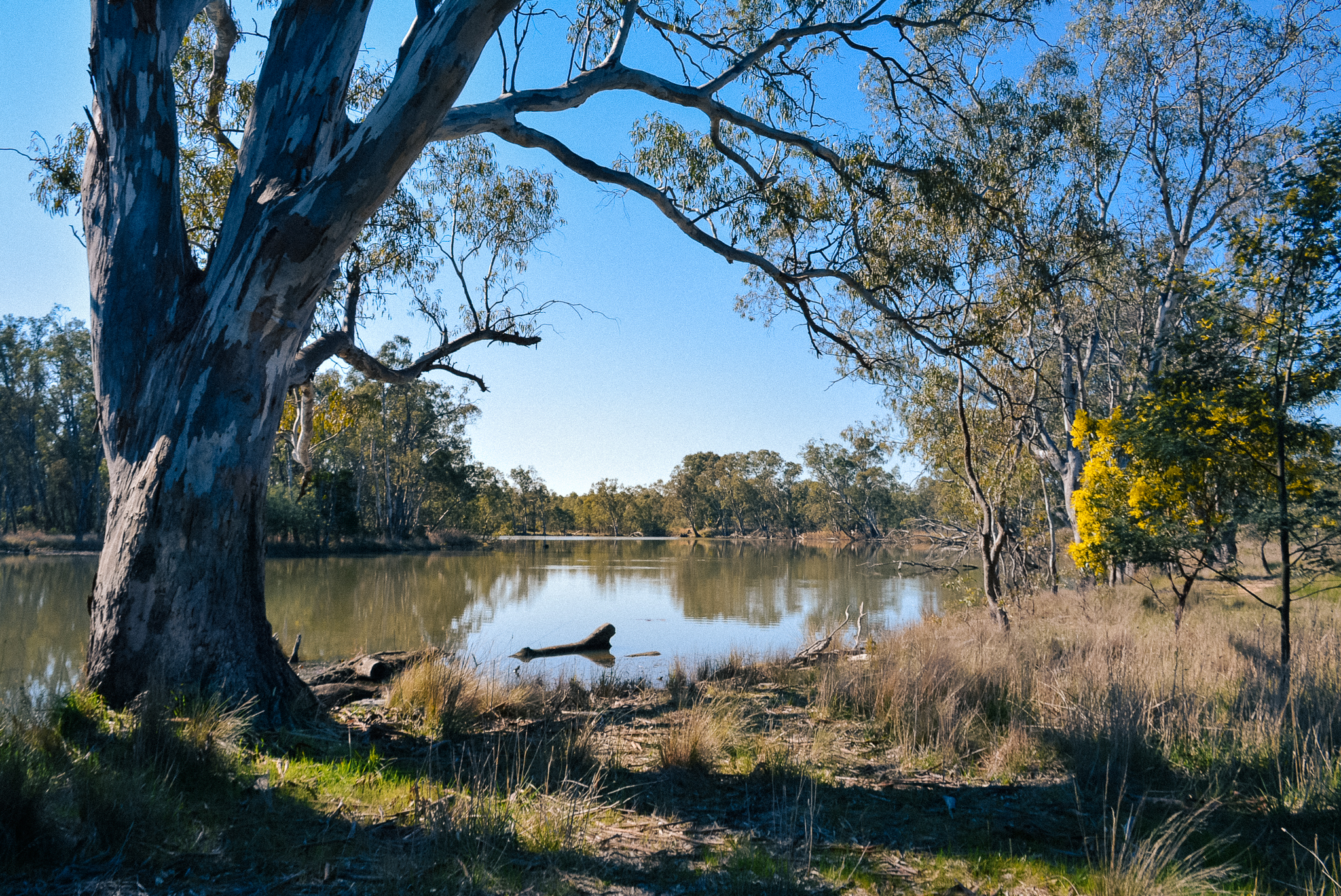
The billabong at Tahbilk wetlands

With the construction of the Goulburn Weir in 1889, the various stages of Sugar Loaf Dam in 1915, and Lake Eildon, completed in 1956, the historical flow regime of the Goulburn river was changed from one of high flows in winter to one of a permanently flowing summer irrigation stream. Previously the river and its associated billabongs had periodically dried back into a series of water holes. The local indigenous people named this area tabilk tabilk, or the place of many water holes, thus giving the property its name. The present Tahbilk wetlands area was created by the raising of the water level at the time that the Goulburn Weir was built.

The Tahbilk wetlands are an open ended, self flushing wetlands joined to the Goulburn. Their warm, slow moving, water has become a safe haven for indigenous flora and fauna, including at least two threatened or endangered species. The native catfish Tandanus tandanus, which is declining throughout the Murray Darling Basin, is now breeding in the wetlands, and the Water Shield Lily Brasenia schreberi is also thriving there.

== See also ==
- Australian wine
