= Seymour, Victoria =

Seymour
- Town
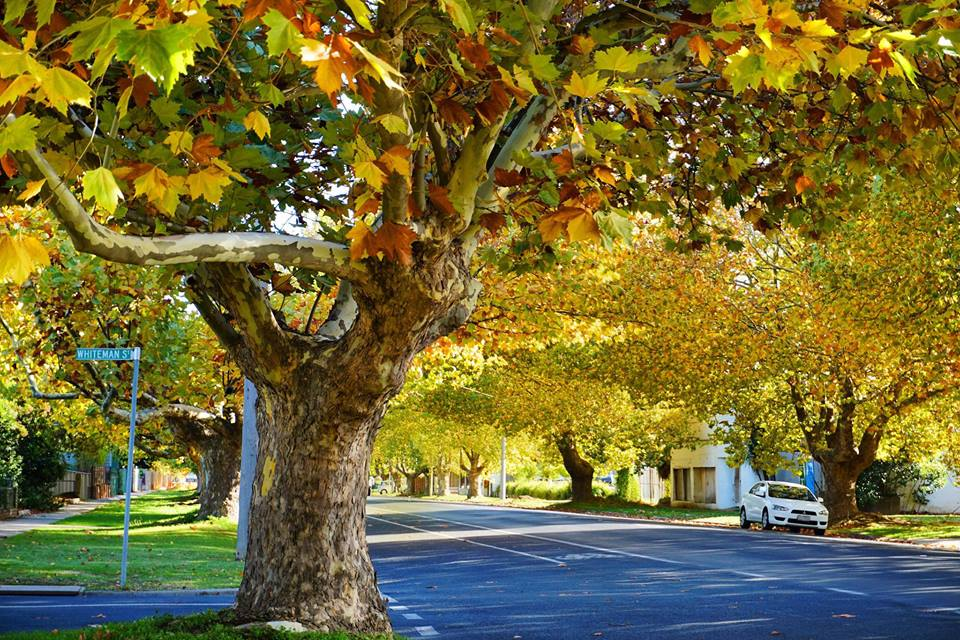
- Tallarook Street during autumn

- Interactive map of Seymour
- Coordinates: 37°1′48″S 145°7′48″E
- Country: Australia
- State: Victoria
- Region: Hume
- LGA: Shire of Mitchell
- Location: 104 km (65 mi) N of Melbourne; 80 km (50 mi) S of Shepparton
- Established: 1839

Government
  - State electorate: Euroa
  - Federal division: Nicholls
- Elevation: 148 m (486 ft)

Population
  - Total: 6,569 (2021)
- Postcode: 3660
- Mean max temp: 21.1 °C (70.0 °F)
- Mean min temp: 7.7 °C (45.9 °F)
- Annual rainfall: 597.9 mm (23.54 in)
Localities around Seymour
Northwood	Mangalore	Avenel
Puckapunyal	Seymour	Whiteheads Creek
Hilldene	Tallarook	Trawool

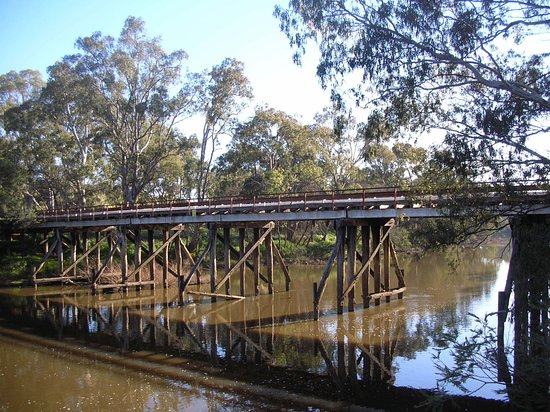
Old Goulburn Bridge Seymour, which was once the main crossing point of the Goulburn River for Melbourne to Sydney road

Seymour (/ˈsiːmɔːr/) is a town in the Southern end of the Goulburn Valley in the Shire of Mitchell, Victoria, Australia and is located 104 kilometres (65 mi) north of Melbourne. At the 2021 census, Seymour had a population of 6,569. The township services the surrounding agricultural industries (primarily equine, cattle, sheep and wine) as well as the nearby military base of Puckapunyal (population 1,176), which is an important training centre for the Australian Army. Other important sectors of employment in Seymour include retail, light engineering, agricultural services support, medical services, and education.

== History ==
The Taungurung people are the traditional owners and inhabitants of the area Seymour now occupies. Specifically, it is the land of the Buthera Balug clan who occupied the area when Europeans first settled the region in the early 1800s. In 1824, Hume and Hovell on their return from Port Phillip, camped by the Goulburn River not far upstream of Seymour. In 1836 Major Thomas Mitchell crossed the Goulburn at Mitchellstown and soon afterwards overlanders and other early settlers began to use this crossing place on the Melbourne–Sydney route (now known as the Hume Highway). The mail service between Melbourne and Sydney had been operating for just a year when it was found that a better route was available using the "New Crossing Place".

The Robert Burns Inn was operating there by the end of 1839. In 1841 the Government decided that the new crossing place was the likely spot for a town. Plans were laid before the Executive Council of NSW and Mitchell proposed the name Seymour which was approved on 21 December 1843. The town was named after Lord Seymour, the son of the 11th Duke of Somerset. The Post Office opened on 1 July 1844. The railway arrived in 1872 along with substantial infrastructure to support it, establishing the town as an important rail hub for the Goulburn Valley, the Melbourne–Sydney railway and North Eastern Victoria. It was one of the first Victorian examples of the railway town phenomenon. In the heyday of the railway it employed 400 men and along with their families comprised one-third of the town population, or 1,500 people. In 1871 the Shire of Seymour was established which also included the towns and localities of Avenel, Mangalore, Tallarook, Whiteheads Creek, Trawool, Hilldene and Northwood. It was proclaimed the Rural City of Seymour in 1993. In 1994, the Rural City of Seymour was abolished and incorporated into the Shire of Mitchell.

== Puckapunyal Army base ==
The Australian Army first established a large training camp 4 kilometres (2.5 mi) east of the township during the First World War. During the Second World War, the eastern camp diminished in importance and a substantially larger and more permanent military township was established 10 kilometres (6.2 mi) to the west at Puckapunyal. As of 2024, Puckapunyal is the centre for the Australian Army Knowledge Group (AKG) and Headquarters Land Combat College (HQ LCC) with two of the Army's five Combat training establishments located on site. Additionally, there are smaller training centres, a large vehicle and armoured maintenance facility as well as the Road Transport Wing of the Army Logistic Training Centre's Army School of Transport based in Puckapunyal. The base is also home to the Australian Army Museum Puckapunyal. Access to the base and museum is restricted and all non-defence visitors must be escorted or obtain special permits for access.

== Wine ==
Seymour is located at the southern end of the Goulburn Valley wine region. The main influencing factors in the Goulburn Valley wine region are the hills of the Great Dividing Range and the Goulburn River which mitigates lengthy and warm summers.

Top varieties: Shiraz, Chardonnay, Cabernet Sauvignon, Riesling and Marsanne

Soil types: sandy clay loams, clay loams and gritty, gravelly quartzose sands

There are several wineries in and near the township which include Wine x Sam, Tahbilk, Mitchelton Winery, Fowles Wines, Kensington Wines and several other boutique vineyards Box Grove vineyard, Brave Goose vineyard, Somerset Crossing vineyard, Vitto Oles Wines and Traawool Valley wines.

Each year Tastes of the Goulburn food and wine festival is hosted in Seymour, showcasing the best local produce from the Goulburn Valley. Seymour also hosts the Victorian Wine Show.

== Education ==
Seymour College is the government school, providing classes from Prep to Year 12. The college was created in 2010 through a merger of Seymour Technical High School (STHS), Seymour Primary School (SPS) Seymour East Primary School (SEPS) and Seymour Special School (SSS) located in Loco Street.

St Mary's College is a Foundation to Year 11 Catholic regional college located in High Street. The College welcomed the return to Year 11 in 2024 and sees the return of Year 12 in 2025. St Mary's is an inclusive College with the motto, ‘Protect and Care for Us’ valuing every member of the College community. Catholic education, for the children of Seymour and surrounding districts, has been provided in Seymour since the year 1880. St Mary's College is a Mercy affiliated school and staff and students are guided by the Mercy Values of justice, compassion, respect, hospitality, service and courage, as illustrated in the story of Catherine McAuley, the Founder of the Sisters of Mercy.

The Seymour campus of the Goulburn Ovens Institute of TAFE, opened in 1998, provides a variety of short courses and vocational education and training.

== Transport ==
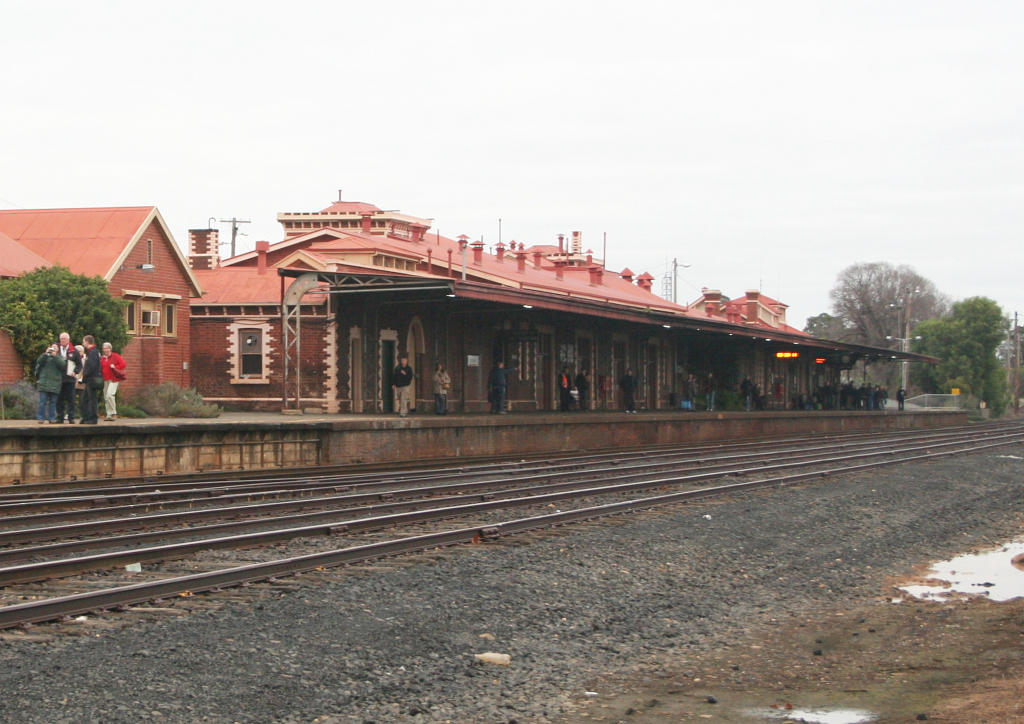
Seymour Station viewed from the main street

Seymour is located adjacent to the junction of the Hume and Goulburn Valley Highway. The Hume Highway crossed the Goulburn River and diverted all Melbourne–Sydney bound traffic though the township for over 100 years until a freeway bypass was opened routing all non-local and interstate traffic around the township in 1982.

Seymour station is served by regular V/Line hourly services to and from Melbourne Southern Cross station as well as services on the Albury and Shepparton lines. The station was once a major freight marshalling location and the home of a significant locomotive depot.

Victoria's electronic ticketing system, Myki, was implemented on rail services between Seymour and Melbourne on 24 June 2013.

== Community ==
Seymour is host to many community and service groups including Freemasonry (established in Seymour in 1883), Rotary, the Lions Club, Scouting, Returned and Services League of Australia and Probus. In addition, local advocacy groups include The Seymour We Want, locally based offices of statewide organisations including Berry Street and Closing The Health Gap (amongst others).

Parkrun volunteers organise a free, weekly, 5km timed event at Goulburn River Trail, Lions Park at 8 o'clock every Saturday morning. The flat, out-and-back course is on a mix of gravel trail and boardwalk alongside the Goulburn River.

== Sport ==
Seymour has sporting facilities that include an indoor multi-purpose sports and aquatic centre, outdoor pool and several large playing fields for athletics, cricket and football. Seymour has a number of successful and well resourced sporting clubs including Cricket, Tennis, Football, Lawn Bowls, Kick Boxing, Basketball and Netball.

Seymour Cricket Club (established 1859) has its club rooms and main ground located at Chittick Park, competes in the Seymour and District Cricket Association fielding 2 senior and 3 junior teams in the 2025/26 season

Seymour Football Club compete in the Goulburn Valley Football League.

Seymour has a horse racing club, the Seymour Racing Club, which schedules around twenty race meetings a year including the Seymour Cup meeting in October.

Golfers play at the course of the Seymour Golf Club on Yea Road.

== Media ==
=== Print ===
- Seymour Telegraph
- North Central Review
- The Situation

=== Radio ===
==== FM ====
- 103.9 FM – Seymour-FM (Community Radio for Northern Mitchell Shire & Strathbogie Shire)
- 88.9 FM – UGFM Upper Goulburn / Murrindindi Radio (Yea translator/repeater)
- 87.6 FM – HIT RADIO (Youth / Top 40 / Dance / Features)

==== Shepparton radio heard in Seymour ====
- 93.7 FM – STAR FM (Flowerdale/Seymour Re-Transmission Site)
- 94.5 FM – ABC Triple J
- 95.3 FM – 3SR FM (3SSR) (Classic Hits – commercial radio)
- 96.1 FM – ABC Classic
- 96.9 FM – Star FM (Contemporary Hits commercial radio)
- 97.7 FM – ABC Local Radio (relay of 774 Melbourne)
- 98.5 FM – ONE FM Community Radio (Poor reception in Seymour)
- 1260 AM – Sport 927 (Relay of 927 AM Melbourne – Racing)

==== Melbourne radio heard in Seymour ====
- 621 AM – ABC Radio National
- 693 AM – 3AW (Talkback / Sport)
- 774 AM – ABC Metropolitan Radio
- 927 AM – Sport 927 (Racing)

=== Television ===
Local free-to-air TV channels in Seymour are available from Shepparton and broadcast from a relay transmitter located south of Seymour on West Falls Road at Meadows Hill. Viewers located on the outskirts of Seymour and nearby towns can receive reception from the Mount Major transmitter east of Shepparton or Bendigo via the Mount Alexander transmitter.

- ABC (plus ABC HD, ABC Family, ABC Kids, ABC Entertains & ABC News)
- SBS (plus SBS HD, SBS2, SBS WorldWatch, SBS World Movies, SBS Food & NITV)
- Seven (plus 7HD, 7two, 7mate, 7flix & 7Bravo)
- WIN (plus 9HD, 9Gem, 9Go! & 9Life)
- 10 (plus 10 HD, 10 Drama, 10 Comedy & Nickelodeon)
