= Mitchellstown =

- Town
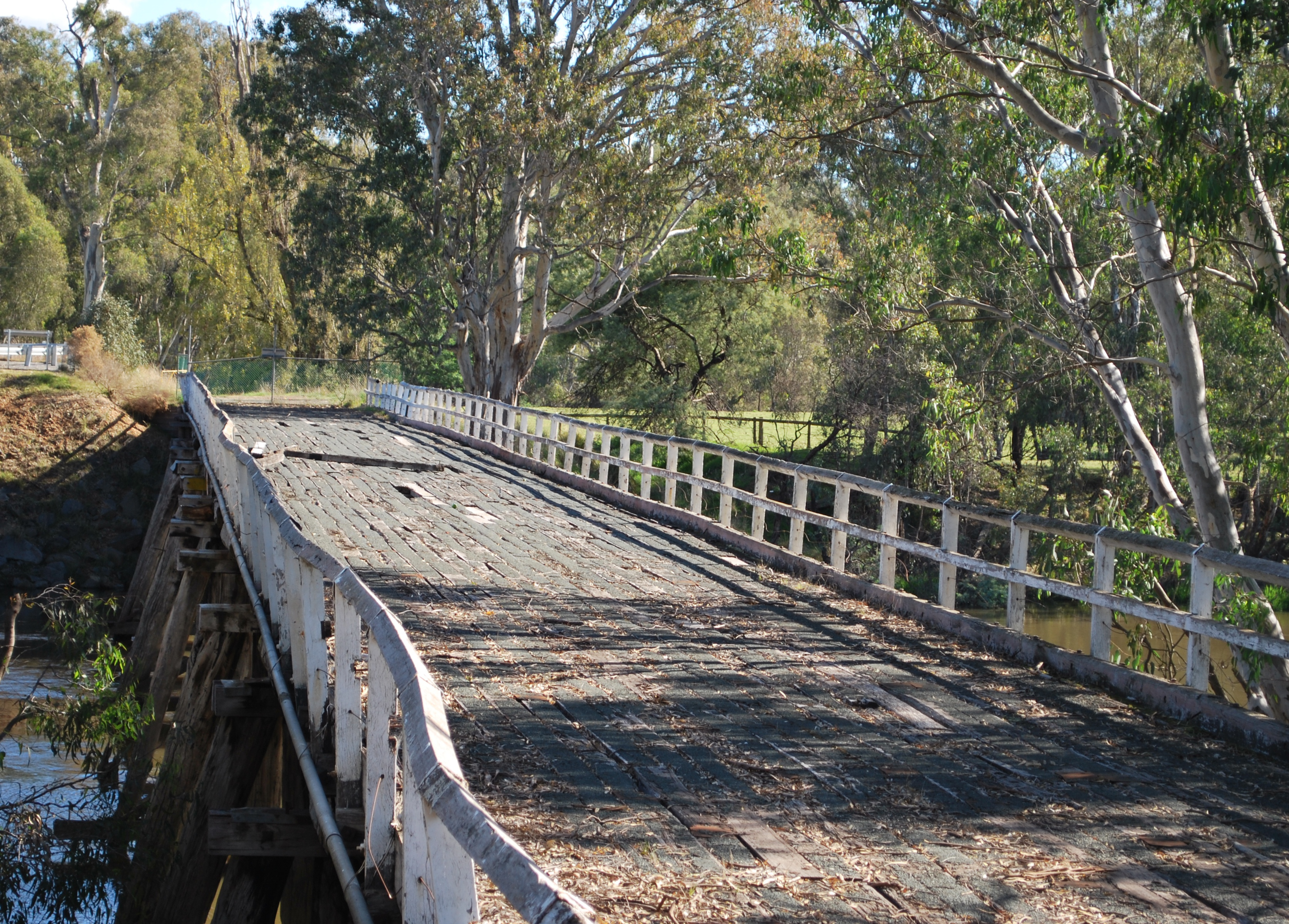
- The old bridge over the Goulburn River at Mitchellstown

- Coordinates: 36°50′47″S 145°06′03″E
- Country: Australia
- State: Victoria
- Region: Hume
- LGA: Shire of Strathbogie
- Location: 134 km (83 mi) N of Melbourne; 63 km (39 mi) S of Shepparton; 11 km (6.8 mi) SW of Nagambie

Government
  - State electorate: Euroa
  - Federal division: Nicholls

Population
  - Total: 57 (2016 census)
- Postcode: 3608

Mitchellstown is a locality in north east Victoria, Australia. The locality is in the Shire of Strathbogie local government area and on the Goulburn River, 134 kilometres (83 mi) north east of the state capital, Melbourne.

Named after Major Thomas Mitchell who crossed the Goulburn River here in 1836 during his Third Expedition.

At the 2016 census, Mitchellstown had a population of 57.
