= Northwood, Victoria =

Northwood
- Town
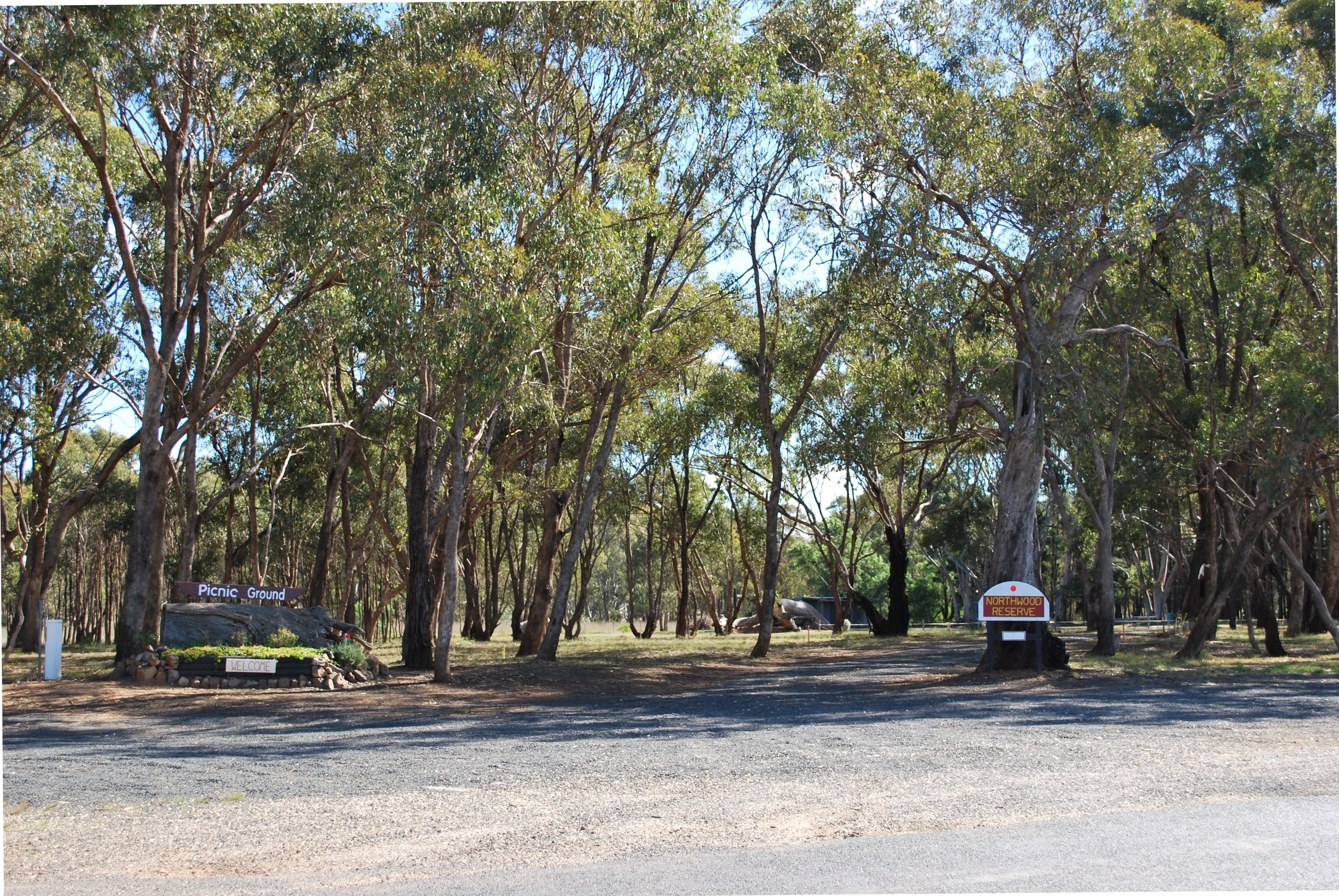
- Northwood Reserve, 2012

- Coordinates: 36°57′47″S 145°06′29″E
- Country: Australia
- State: Victoria
- Region: Hume
- LGA: Shire of Mitchell
- Location: 117 km (73 mi) N of Melbourne; 13 km (8.1 mi) N of Seymour

Government
  - State electorate: Euroa
  - Federal division: Nicholls

Population
  - Total: 195 (2016 census)
- Postcode: 3660

Northwood is a locality in central Victoria, Australia. The locality is in the Shire of Mitchell local government area, 117 kilometres (73 mi) north west of the state capital, Melbourne.

At the 2016 census, Northwood had a population of 195.
