= Goulburn Weir =

Weir in Victoria, Australia

- Original weir wall

- Location of the weir in Victoria
- Interactive map of Goulburn Weir
- Country: Australia
- Location: Goldfields, Victoria
- Coordinates: 36°43′02″S 145°10′12″E
- Purpose: Irrigation
- Status: Operational
- Construction began: 1887
- Opening date: 1891
- Construction cost: A£106,262
- Operator: Goulburn-Murray Water

Dam and spillways
- Type of dam: Gravity dam
- Impounds: Goulburn River
- Height (foundation): 15 m (49 ft)
- Length: 212 m (696 ft)
- Dam volume: 14×10^{3} m^{3} (490×10^{3} cu ft)
- Spillway type: Controlled
- Spillway capacity: 1,897 m^{3}/s (67,000 cu ft/s)

Reservoir
- Creates: Lake Nagambie
- Total capacity: 25,000 ML (20,000 acre⋅ft)
- Catchment area: 10,600 km^{2} (4,100 sq mi)
- Surface area: 1,120 ha (2,800 acres)
- Normal elevation: 128 m (420 ft) AHD

The Goulburn Weir is a weir across the Goulburn River near Nagambie, in the Goldfields region of Victoria, Australia. Completed between 1887 and early 1891, it was the first major diversion structure built for irrigation development in Australia. The weir forms Lake Nagambie where rowing regattas and waterskiing tournaments are held.

== Dam overview ==
The Goulburn Weir allows water to be diverted by gravity via the Stuart Murray Canal and Cattanach Canal for off-river storage in the Waranga basin, for later use in irrigation. The structure also contained one of the first hydro-electric turbines in the Southern Hemisphere, used to supply power for lifting and lighting; however, the power station was subsequently decommissioned.

The concrete gravity dam wall is 15 metres (49 ft) high and 212 metres (696 ft) long. When full, the resultant reservoir has a storage capacity of 25,000 megalitres (20,000 acre⋅ft) and covers 1,120 hectares (2,800 acres), drawn from a catchment area of 10,600 square kilometres (4,100 sq mi). The controlled spillway has a discharge capacity of 1,897 cubic metres per second (67,000 cu ft/s). Its design was considered very advanced for its time, so much so that it featured on the back of half-sovereign and ten-shilling notes from 1913 to 1933, including on the first Australian banknote ever issued.

After more than 90 years of continuous service, many of the weir's components were in urgent need of replacement. Stabilisation works were done in 1983 and in 1987.

The weir raises the level of the Goulburn River so that water can be diverted, by gravity, along the main irrigation supply channels: Stuart Murray Canal, Cattanach Canal, East Goulburn Main Channel. The weir services nearby farming of crops including wheat, stock and domestic supplies.

=== Construction ===
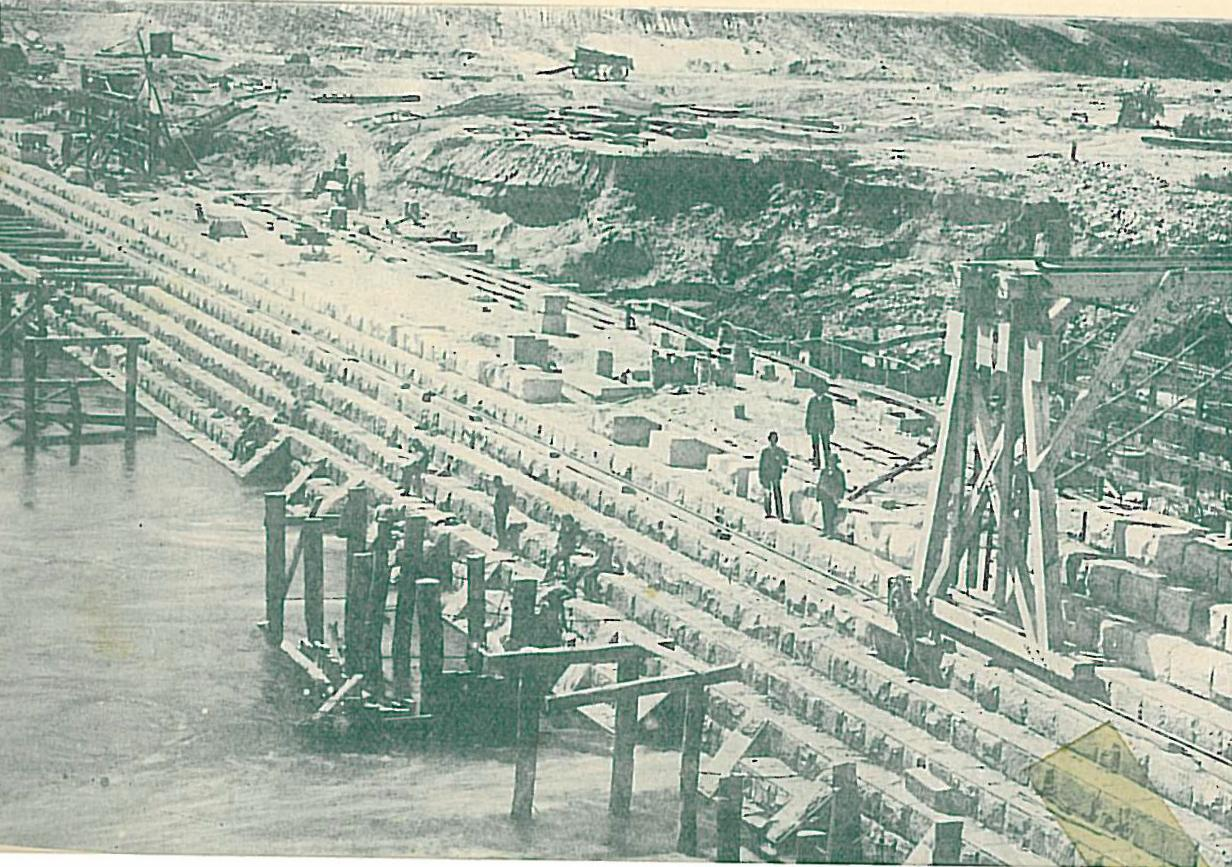
The weir under construction, in 1889

Approval for the construction of the Goulburn Weir was granted on 16 December 1886, by the passing of The River Goulburn Weir Act 1886. This act allowed the treasury of Victoria to issue up to £20,000 for the construction of the weir and related works. A further £75,000 was approved under The Water Supply Loans Act 1887.

The construction of the weir began with the construction of six tunnels designed to pass the normal river flow. These would allow the construction of the masonry section of the weir to proceed with the river flows passing through the tunnels underneath. The tunnels were fitted with sluice gates that could be closed once the weir was completed allowing structure to raise the height of the river upstream.

The main body of the weir is constructed from concrete masonry, that is large concrete blocks that were bedded and jointed in cement mortar. It is backed with steps of granite blocks, each to the height of a 0.61-metre (2 ft) course. The stone and sand for the concrete was sourced locally, the stone was quarried from a hill 3.2 kilometres (2 mi) to the north and the sand was obtained from various pits within 6.4 kilometres (4 mi) of the weir. The granite for the weir was sourced from Mount Black, 24 kilometres (15 mi) to the south west.

The weir was completed, the tunnel sluices closed down, and the river allowed to flow over the weir in the early part of December 1890. The water level upstream was slowly raised and storage reached its full supply level towards the end of July 1891. The final cost of the weir works was A£106,262.

== Reservoir ==
Lake Nagambie is a 170-hectare (420-acre) reservoir formed by the Goulburn Weir. The town of Nagambie is on the lake's shore. A 5-kilometre (3.1 mi) parkrun has been held on the lake foreshores.

== Gallery ==
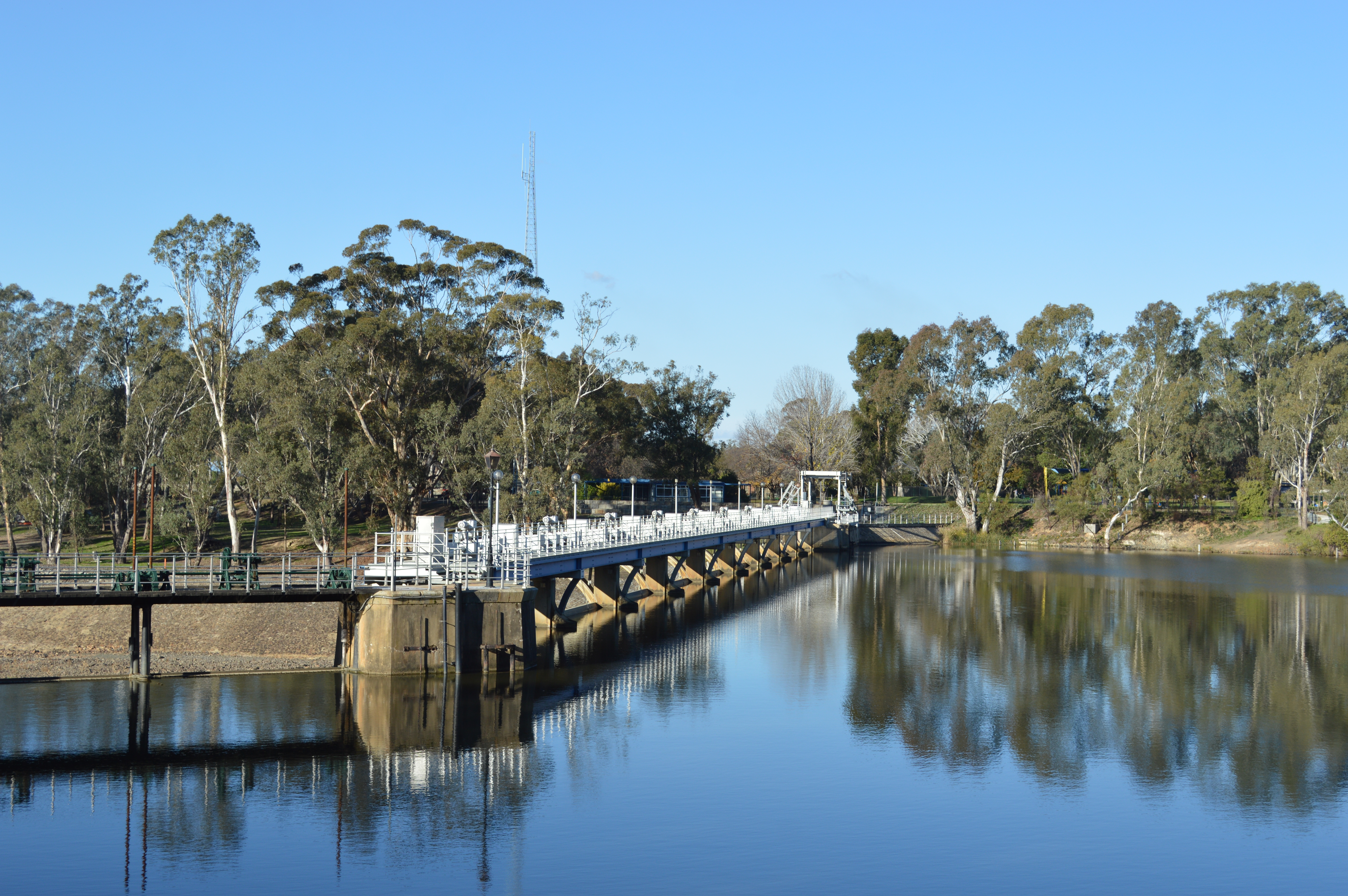
The weir in 2013

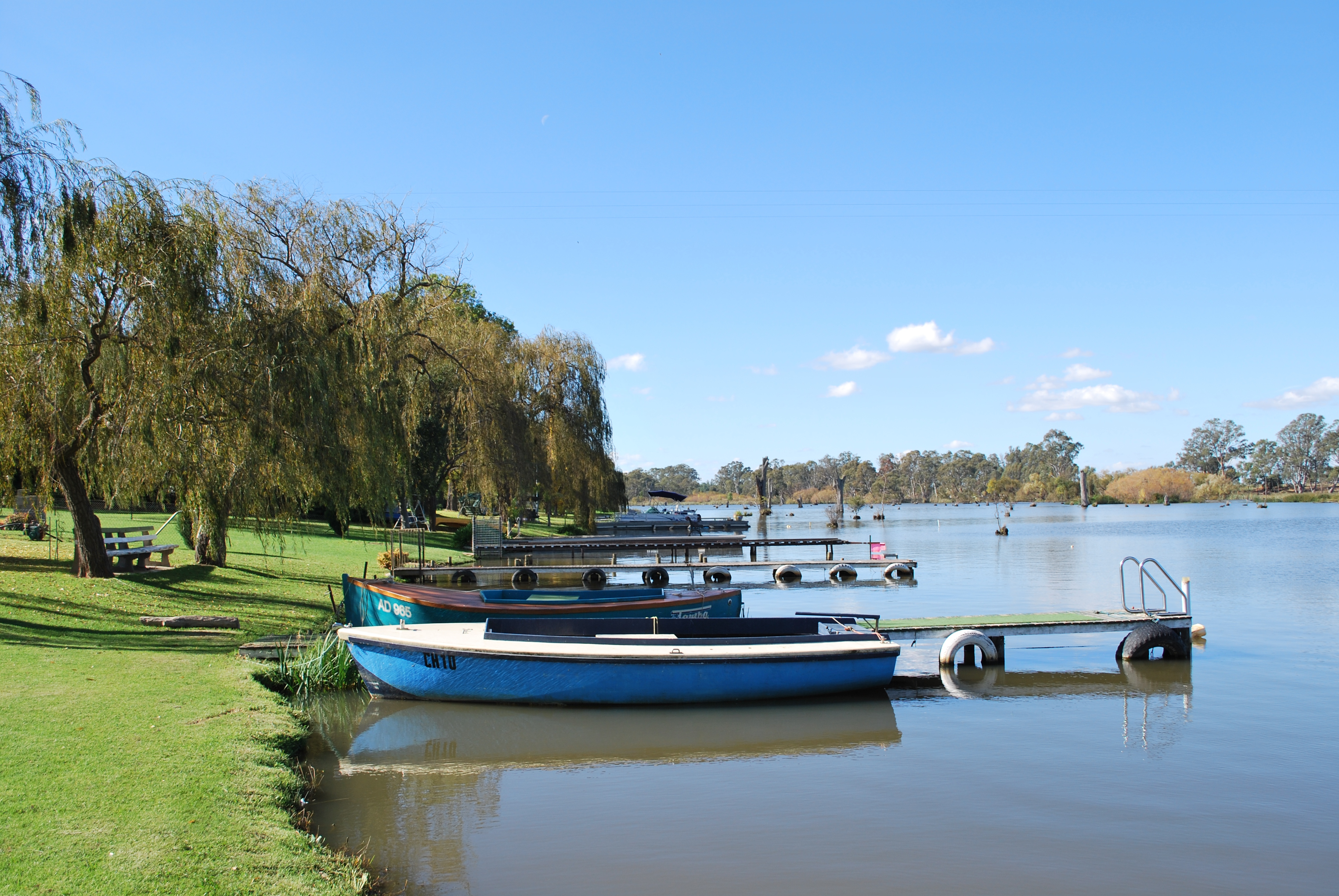
Boats on Lake Nagambie

== See also ==
- List of dams and reservoirs in Victoria
- Irrigation in Australia
