= Waranga Dam =

Dam in Victoria, Australia

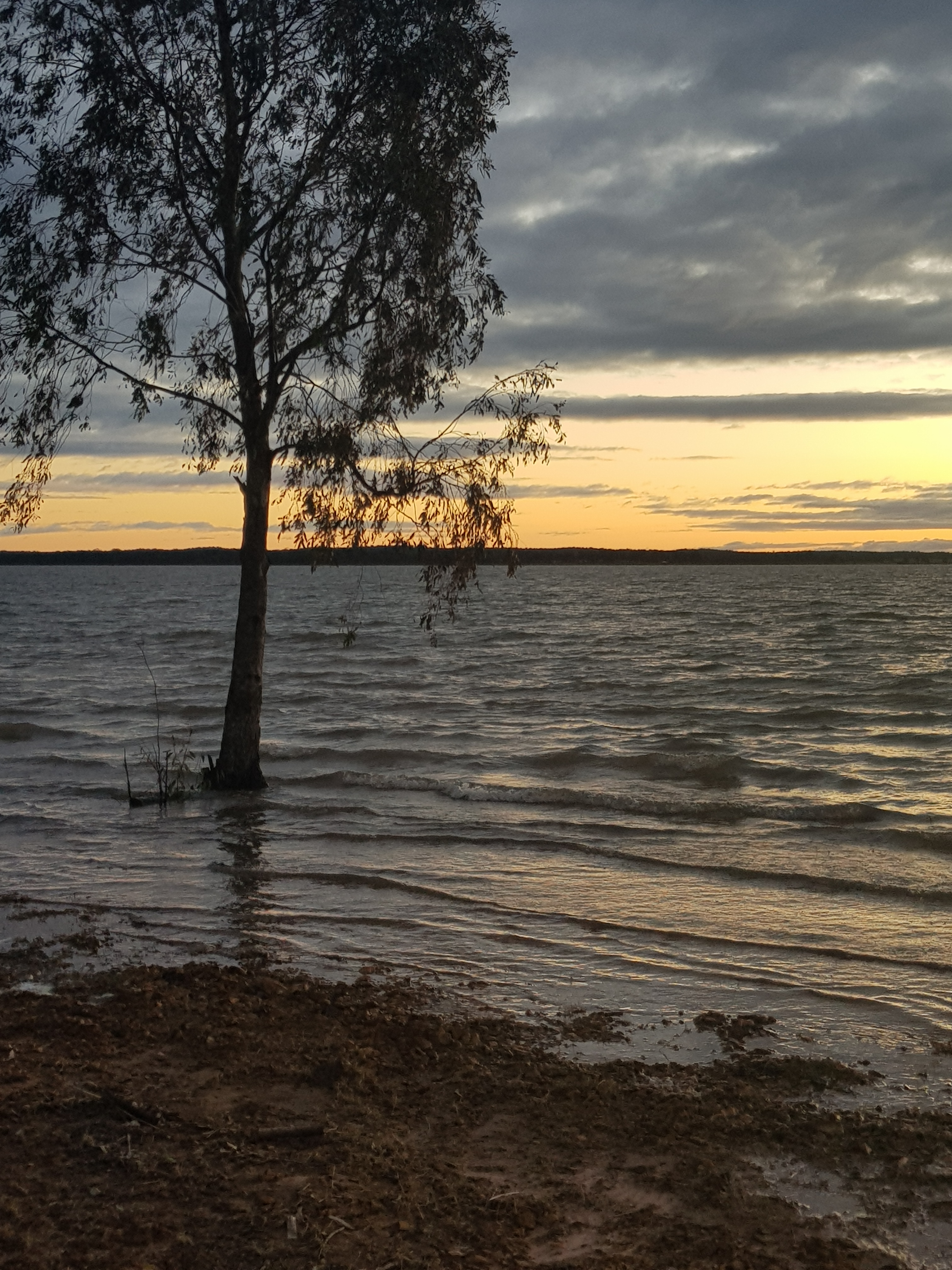
- The reservoir at Harriman Point, 2023

- Location of the dam in Victoria
- Country: Australia
- Location: North Central region, Victoria
- Coordinates: 36°33′S 145°06′E
- Purpose: Irrigation
- Status: Operational
- Construction began: 1905
- Opening date: 1915; 1926
- Owner: Goulburn–Murray Water

Dam and spillways
- Type of dam: Earth fill dam
- Impounds: Off-stream
- Height (foundation): 12.2 m (40 ft)
- Length: 7 km (4.3 mi)
- Dam volume: 58.480×10^{6} m^{3} (2.0652×10^{9} cu ft)
- Spillway type: Uncontrolled

Reservoir
- Creates: Waranga Basin
- Total capacity: 432,360 ML (350,520 acre⋅ft)
- Catchment area: 110 km^{2} (42 sq mi)
- Surface area: 5,848 ha (14,450 acres)
- Normal elevation: 119 m (390 ft) AHD
- Website g-mwater.com.au

The Waranga Dam is an earth-filled embankment dam that impounds an off-stream reservoir, located approximately 150 kilometres (93 mi) north of Melbourne in the North Central region of Victoria, Australia. The impoundment, the Waranga Basin, forms part of the Goulburn River irrigation system, irrigating an area of 626 square kilometres (242 sq mi). Situated in Shire of Campaspe near the City of Greater Shepparton, 8 kilometres (5 mi) north-east of Rushworth, 12 kilometres (7.5 mi) south-west of Tatura, and near Murchison, it was the first major dam constructed in Australia.

The dam and reservoir, including its irrigation flows, are operated by Goulburn–Murray Water.

== Dam and reservoir overview ==
=== Dam ===
Construction of the earth-filled dam began in 1905 and was completed in 1915 using picks, shovels and horse-drawn scoops. The site of the basin was a former swamp in the then Waranga Shire. Construction of the dam was commissioned by the State Rivers and Water Supply Commission of Victoria for the irrigation of the Western Goulburn Valley. At the time of construction, the Waranga Basin embankment was described as the largest project of its sort in the world.

The dam wall is 8.8 metres (29 ft) high and 7 kilometres (4.3 mi) long. When full, the resultant reservoir has a storage capacity of 432,360 megalitres (350,520 acre⋅ft) and covers 5,848 hectares (14,450 acres), drawn from a catchment area of 110 square kilometres (42 sq mi). The dam has an uncontrolled spillway.

Between 1915 and 1926, the embankment was raised in stages and a core wall was inserted. By 1921, the embankment was raised to 12.2 metres (40 ft) allowing the storage capacity to be increased to its current capacity. The major road between Tatura and Rushworth crosses the outlet.

=== Reservoir ===
The area now covered by the Waranga Basin includes a swamp that was known as Warranga (an Aboriginal word) or Gunn's after William Gunn, one of the early pastoralists who established his squatting run, also called Waranga, in the area surrounding the swamp. William Gunn was a Braehour Gunn who emigrated to Victoria in 1853 from Wick, Scotland. His half-brother was Donald Gunn of Manitoba, Canada. Gold was discovered near Waranga Swamp in 1853, making it one of Victoria's oldest goldfields.

Waranga Basin stores water flowing downstream from Lake Eildon as well as having a catchment area of its own. Waranga Basin supplies water to the Central Goulburn Irrigation Area and Rochester Irrigation Area. However, the Waranga Western Channel takes some of the water 180 kilometres (110 mi) to Pyramid Hill and Boort. Normally, approximately three-quarters of the reservoir's capacity can be used in irrigation. However, in 2002–03, an additional 90,000 megalitres (73,000 acre⋅ft) were pumped to the Goulburn Irrigation System to assist farmers experiencing severe drought.

== See also ==
- Irrigation in Australia
- List of reservoirs and dams in Victoria
- Waranga North East Football Association
