= Penrith Australian Football Club =

Australian rules football club

Penrith Rams

Names
- Full name: Penrith Rams Australian Football Club
- Nickname: The Rams

Club details
- Founded: 1981; 45 years ago
- Colours: White black, teal
- Competition: AFL Sydney
- Chairperson: Luke Burcher (2026)
- Coach: Kevin Kirk (2026)
- Captain: Josh Rodman (2026)
- Ground: Greygums Oval, Greygums Road, Cranebrook, NSW, 2749

Uniforms
Home

The Penrith Australian Football Club is an Australian rules football club based in the western Sydney suburb of Penrith, which plays its home games at Greygums Oval, Cranebrook. It competes in the AFL Sydney competition.

== History ==
Penrith Australian Football Club was founded in 1981, primarily as a result of work by Keith Claxton.

Penrith players celebrate winning the 1989 Sydney AFL Second Division Grand Final

Until 1983 Penrith did not have their own home ground, sharing facilities with the Hawkesbury Saints. In 1983, Penrith began to play their home games at Sales Park, Luddenham. This lasted until 1987 when they moved to Greygums Oval, Cranebrook.

In 2000, Penrith had an incredibly successful season, making finals, and only narrowly being knocked out by Wollongong Lions.

In 2001, Michael Whitely was appointed as head coach of Penrith. On 21 July 2001, Penrith held the club's 21st anniversary celebrations. The celebrations conincided with all Penrith teams of all grades playing home games against Nor-West Jets. Penrith won all three games. The celebrations were attended by Federal Minister for Sport Jackie Kelly. Unfortunately for the club, they would miss out on finals in 2001.

In 2002, the Rams under 18s won the premiership. 2002 would see the First Division team start a 28 game losing streak, which wouldn't end until May 2004.

In 2003, Penrith moved their home ground to Dukes Oval, Emu Plains.

In 2005, after three consecutive wooden spoons, Penrith again made finals in the First Division, after a 93 point victory over South West Sydney.

In 2006, Penrith was forced to move off of Duke Oval by the City of Penrith Council. The club returned to playing at Greygums Oval.

During the 2010 season, the future New South Wales Minister for Sport, Stuart Ayres, played for the Rams.

In 2014, Barry Denton took over the role of head coach.

In 2018, the Rams won the AFL Sydney Platinum Division Grand Final, following a seven year premiership drought. The Rams defeated Western Magic 8.10 (58) to 6.5 (41) to claim the flag. Rams star Mitch Stevens, who scored three of Penrith's eight goals, missed the start of the 2019 season due to a shoulder injury.

In 2022, unseasonal rains led to the closure of Greygums Oval for the season, and Penrith instead played at Caddens Oval, Caddens.

In 2024, former Penrith premiership player, Jay Edwards, took over the role of head coach.

== Club identity and culture ==
=== Guernseys ===
From its formation until 2005, the club wore the colours of the Geelong Football Club, comprising guernseys with blue and white horizontal hoops. (In 2001 an updated style of the guernsey adding a "PFC" monogram on the front was adopted). In 2006, the Rams changed their club colours and guernsey design to black, with teal, white and red trimmings. A modified version of this guernsey was adopted in 2009. In 2010, the club moved to its current guernsey design, which is now principally teal and white. Several variations of the teal/white guernsey have been used since.

==== Uniform evolution ====
| 1981-2000 | 2001-2005 | 2010-2023 | 2024-present |

== Club Honours ==
=== List of Grand Final Victories ===
| Year | Competition | Opponent | Score |
|---|---|---|---|
| 1989 | Sydney FL Second Division | Auburn | 14.5 (89) – 5.8 (38) |
| 1991 | Sydney FA Second Division | Hawkesbury | 22.17 (149) – 10.11 (71) |
| 2001 | AFL Sydney under 18s Second Division | Manly Warringah | 12.17 (89) – 4.3 (27) |
| 2002 | AFL Sydney under 18s Second Division | Wollongong | 6.9 (45) – 3.9 (27) |
| 2010 | AFL Sydney Under 18 Grade Challenge Cup | Holroyd-Parramatta | 17.17 (119) – 6.2 (38) |
| 2011 | Sydney AFL Division 2 | Balmain | 12.7 (79) – 6.8 (44) |
| 2012 | Sydney AFL Division 4 | Gosford | 9.16 (70) – 8.6 (54) |
| 2018 | AFL Sydney Platinum Division | Western Magic | 8.10 (58) – 6.5 (41) |
| 2020 | AFL Sydney Platinum Division | Southern Power | 14.7 (91) – 5.7 (37) |

=== Minor Premierships ===
1982 Sydney District FA Reserve Grade
1991 Sydney FA First Grade
2001 Sydney AFL Under 18 Division 2
2010 AFL Sydney Under 18 Challenge Cup
2011 AFL Sydney Division 2 (Senior Grade)
2011 AFL Sydney Division 4 (Reserve Grade)
2019 AFL Sydney Platinum Division (Senior Grade)
2025 AFL Sydney Division 2 (Senior Grade)

=== Club Records ===
Highest Score - 62.22 (394) vs Camden (Senior Grade), 1986
Highest Finals Score - 32.15 (207) - Under 18 Gr vs Southern Power, 2010
Highest Quarter (1990 Onwards) - 14.13 (97) - Senior Gr vs Blacktown, 1994
Most Career Games - 315 - Christian Triffitt
Most Career Games (Senior Grade) - 219 - Jason Ware
Most Career Games (Ramettes) - 164 - Kate Walker
Most Career Goals - 553 - Mitchell Stevens
Most Career Goals (Ramettes) - 174 - Kate Walker
Most Goals In A Season - 126 - Tom Hall - Reserve Gr, 1982
Most Goals In A Season (Ramettes) - 38 - Kate Walker - 2023
Most Goals In A Game - 20 - Steve Cox - Senior Gr vs Blacktown, 1987
Most Goals In A Game (Ramettes) - 7 - Kate Walker - Ramettes Res Gr vs Camden, 2017
Most Goals In A Final - 10 - Ben McGovern - Under 18 Gr vs Southern Power, 2010

== Individual Honours ==
=== VFL/AFL Players ===
The following Penrith players have played in the Australian Football League or, prior to 1990, in the Victorian Football League:

- Michael Hartley – Collingwood, Essendon, Hawthorn
- Earl Shaw – Sydney

=== AFLW Players ===
The following Penrith players have played in the AFL Women's:

- Renee Tomkins – Greater Western Sydney

=== League/Association Award Winners ===
1981: Keith Claxton - McFarlane Medal (Sydney District FA Reserve Gr)
1982: Keith Claxton - McFarlane Medal (Sydney District FA Reserve Gr)
1989: Geoff Eldering - Apted Medal (Sydney FL Div 2 Senior Gr)
1992: Graeme Tuckwell - Armstrong Medal (Sydney FA Div 2 Reserve Gr)*
1994: David Armstrong - Snow Medal (Sydney FA Senior Gr)
2000: David Bradley - Hart Medal (Sydney AFL U18 Gr Div 2)
2001: Greg Masters - McFarlane Medal (Sydney FA Reserve Gr)
2001: Michael Ross - Hart Medal (Sydney AFL U18 Gr Div 2)
2002: Michael Ross - Hart Medal (Sydney FA U18 Gr)
2004: Daniel Molkentin - Armstrong Medal (Sydney AFL Second Div)
2010: Lachlan Smith - McFarlane Medal (Sydney AFL Div 3)
2010: Jason Ware - Armstrong Medal (Sydney AFL Div 4)
2010: Matthew Payne - Hart Medal (Sydney AFL U18 Challenge Cup)
2011: David Bradley & Dale Chivas - Sanders Medal (Sydney AFL Div 2) (Joint winners)
2014: Nikki Perrett - James Medal (Sydney AFL Women's Div 2)
2015: Nikki Perrett – James Medal (Sydney AFL Women's Div 2)*
2015: Ben Mayer – Sanders Medal (Sydney AFL Div 2)
2019: Ed Kirby - McFarlane Medal (Sydney AFL Platinum Div Reserve Gr)
2022: Ammie Vamah - Andrews-Burgmann Medal (Sydney AFL Women's Div 2)*
2023: Lauren Russell - Andrews-Burgmann Medal (Sydney AFL Women's Div 2)*
2024: Tamara Mossfield - Andrews-Burgmann Medal (Sydney AFL Women's Div 2)
*Joint winners with player(s) from other club(s)

=== League/Association Goalkicking Awards ===
1981: Peter Traeger - Sydney District FA Reserve Gr (50)
1982: Tom Hall - Sydney District FA Reserve Gr (119)
1989: Phillip Lane - Sydney FL 1 Metro Colts (U/20) Gr (38)
1992: David Robinson - Sydney FA Div 2 Reserve Gr (37)
2001: Michael Ross - Sydney AFL U18 Gr Div 2 (58)
2002: Michael Ross - Sydney FA U18 Gr (62)
2010: Ben McGovern - Sydney AFL U18 Challenge Cup (79)
2011: Jason Bradley - Sydney AFL Div 4 (50)
2014: Mitchell Stevens - Sydney AFL Div 3 (73)
2014: Kevin Kirk - Sydney AFL Div 5 (79)
2015: Jessie Burnham - Sydney AFL Women's Div 2 (33)
2016: Phillip Aumann - Sydney AFL Div 2 (74)
2017: Mitchell Stevens - Sydney AFL Div 2 (102)
2018: Phillip Aumann - Sydney AFL Platinum Div (45)
2018: Rick Ooms - Sydney AFL Platinum Div Reserve Gr (47)
2019: Phillip Aumann - Sydney AFL Platinum Div (56)
2025: Mitchell Stevens - Sydney AFL Div 2 (74)
2025: Dylan Nelson - Sydney AFL Div 5(47)
*Number of goals to end of H & A season indicated in brackets

== Other League Honours ==
1998: Penrith AFC - Sydney FA Club Administration Award (joint winner)
2012: Stephanie Kostic - Sydney AFL Women's Rising Star
2012: Natalie Camilleri - Sydney AFL Women's Team of the Year
2014: Nikki Perrett - Sydney AFL Women's Team of the Year
2014: Greg Corless - Sydney AFL Volunteer of the Year
2015: Nikki Perrett - Sydney AFL Women's Team of the Year
2017: Renee Tomkins - Sydney AFL Women's Team of the Year
2017: Melissa Brydon - Sydney AFL Women's Team of the Year
2018: Renee Tomkins - Sydney AFL Women's Team of the Year
2018: Lael Kassem - Sydney AFL Women's Team of the Year
