= Carol Breen =

Irish association and Australian rules football player

Personal information
- Date of birth: 21 January 1986 (age 40)
- Place of birth: Waterford, Ireland
- Position: Defender

Senior career*
Years	Team	Apps	(Gls)
?–?	Benfica	?	(?)
2014	Benfica	?	(?)
2014–2016	Wexford Youths	?	(?)

International career
? – ?	Republic of Ireland U17	?	(?)
2004–2005	Republic of Ireland U19	?	(?)
2015 – ?	Republic of Ireland	2+	(?)
- * Club domestic league appearances and goals

Carol Breen (born 21 January 1986) is an Irish Australian rules footballer and former association footballer, who has played for the Republic of Ireland women's national football team and the Ireland national Australian rules football team. At club Australian rules football level, she most recently played for Randwick City Saints, and at club association football level, Breen last played for Wexford Youths.

== Association football career ==
Breen played as a defender. Breen represented Republic of Ireland under-17s in the football event at the 2003 European Youth Summer Olympic Festival. She played for the Republic of Ireland under-19s from 2004 to 2005, and was in the squad for UEFA European Under-19 Championship qualifying matches. At the time, she was playing for Benfica.

Breen later quit association football, and went backpacking in Australia. Whilst there she played Australian rules football and Gaelic football. She later lived in Canada, before returning to Ireland in 2014. She re-signed for local association football club Benfica in Waterford. Breen signed for Wexford Youths for the 2014–15 Women's National League season.

In March 2015, Breen made her debut for the Republic of Ireland women's national football team in the 2015 Istria Cup, and also played in Ireland's match against Austria at the same tournament. She had previously been called up to the squad for a winter training camp in La Manga. In 2015, she played for Wexford Youths in the UEFA Women's Champions League; she scored four goals in a qualifying group stage match against Cardiff Met. She was also part of the Wexford Youths team that won the 2015 FAI Women's Cup, the first time that Wexford Youths had won the tournament. She was named in the Women's National League Team of the Season for the 2014–15 season.

In January 2016, Breen was not selected in the Ireland squad for matches against the United States, as she was preparing to emigrate to Australia. Breen returned to Australia later that year.

== Australian rules career ==
Carol Breen

Playing career
Years	Club	Games (Goals)
2016–2017	UTS Shamrocks	? (?)
2018	Nor-West Jets	14 (11)
2019	UTS Australian Football Club	14 (2)
2020	Randwick City Saints	10 (11)

International team honours
Years	Team	Games (Goals)
? – ?	Ireland	? (?)

Breen played for UTS Shamrocks, and in 2016, she won the AFL Sydney Women's Division One Best and Fairest award. In 2018, she made 11 appearances for the Nor-West Jets, and she made 14 appearances for UTS Australian Football Club in 2019. In 2020, Breen made 10 appearances for Randwick City Saints.

Breen was part of the Ireland national Australian rules football team that won the 2017 Australian Football International Cup. She won the "best on ground" award in the final.
