= Mostyn Medal =

Award for best and fairest NSW women's AFL player

The Mostyn Medal is an annual award given in the AFL Sydney. Named after Sam Mostyn, the first ever female AFL Commissioner, the medal is awarded to best and fairest player of the Women's Premier Division competition each year.

== History ==
The award was first awarded in 2012 when the Sydney Women's AFL came under the umbrella of AFL Sydney, and was named the Mostyn Medal in 2015. The medal is named after Sam Mostyn, the first ever female AFL Commissioner.

It has been awarded annual since then, except in 2021, due to the cancellation of the 2021 AFL Sydney season due to the COVID-19 outbreak across Greater Sydney.

== Criteria and methodology ==
It is awarded to best and fairest player of the Women's Premier Division competition each year

At the completion of each match, the field umpires combine to cast votes for the three best players on the ground in a 3-2-1 format. The player with the most votes at the end of the season is considered the Best and Fairest player and is awarded the Mostyn Medal.

== Mostyn Medallists ==
Year	Winner	Club	Votes
2012	Courtney Gum	UNSW-Eastern Suburbs Stingrays	28
2013	Madelane Collier	Wollongong Saints	16
2014	Stephanie Walker	Sydney University Bombers	24
2015	Amanda Farrugia (1)	Macquarie University Warriors	27
2016	Nicola Barr	Sydney University Bombers	24
2017	Amanda Farrugia (2)	Macquarie University Warriors	28
2018	Pippa Smyth	Macquarie University Warriors	17
2019	Amanda Farrugia (3)	Macquarie University Warriors	25
2020	Claudia Gunjaca	UTS Bats	16
2021	Not Awarded		
2022	Sera Kaukiono	UNSW-Eastern Suburbs Bulldogs	17
2023	Maryanne Harley	Sydney University Students	25
2024	Hannah Woolf (1)	Manly Warringah Wolves	18
2025	Hannah Woolf (2)	Manly Warringah Wolves	26
2026	Lucy Yates	North Shore Bombers	19

== Multiple winners ==
Medals	Player	Team	Seasons
3	Amanda Farrugia	Macquarie University Warriors	2015, 2017, 2019
2	Hannah Woolf	Manly Warringah Wolves	2024, 2025

== Mostyn Medallists by club ==
Club	Total wins	Years
Macquarie University Warriors	4	2015, 2017, 2018, 2019
Sydney University Bombers/Students	3	2014, 2016, 2023
UNSW-Eastern Suburbs Stingrays/Bulldogs	2	2012, 2022
Manly Warringah Wolves	2	2024, 2025
UTS Shamrocks/Bats	1	2020
Wollongong Saints	1	2013
North Shore Bombers	1	2026

== See also ==
- Phelan Medal
- Bob Skilton Medal
- Brett Kirk Medal
- Kevin Sheedy Medal
