= Western Magic Australian Football Club =

Western Magic

Names
- Full name: Western Magic Australian Football Club
- Former name: Blacktown Magic Australian Football Club
- Nickname: Magic

Club details
- Founded: 2011
- Colours: Black Red Gold
- Competition: AFL Sydney
- President: Laura Foss
- Ground: BISP (capacity: 2,500)

Uniforms
Home

Other information
- Official website: Western Magic AFC

Western Magic Australian Football Club is an Australian rules football club based in the western Sydney suburb of Blacktown. The club competes in AFL Sydney and fields teams across the Men's, and Women's competitions. They play at Blacktown International Sportspark.

== History ==
Blacktown Magic was formed in late 2011. In 2012, the Magic fielded a solitary team in the Division 3 competition, finishing runners up in their inaugural season to the UTS Bats. The club was originally based out of The Ponds.

In 2013, they expanded to two sides - a Division 3 and a Division 5 side. The club was given a $5000 grant from FaHCSIA to assist in training volunteers. The Division 3 side finished Minor Premiers. The Magic beat Gosford Wildcats in the Qualifying Final by 71 points, before defeating Randwick City Saints AFC in the Semi Finals by 85 points. The Saints were able to scrape through their Preliminary Final against Nor-West Jets, and so the Grand Final was a replay of the Semi Final. Blacktown led by a solitary point at quarter time, but managed to keep their lead throughout the game, getting to a 26 point lead at three quarter time. The Saints surged late, but could only bring the margin down to 10 points. Blacktown won 11.11 (77) to 10.6 (66). This Grand Final victory earned the side a promotion to Division 2. Blacktown were declared the Swisse AFL Quality Club of the Year in 2013.

In 2014, the Division 5 side finished fourth at the end of the regular season. A late season charge saw them win the Grand Final over local rivals Penrith to claim the club's second premiership. The Division 2 side finished Runners Up, losing the Grand Final to minor premiers Sydney University. The club highlight is Daniel Lim getting 27 votes and finishing Runner Up in the 2014 Division 2 B&F.

In 2015, the club added its first Women's team, who qualified for the finals in their first season. The Men's Division 2 side made amends for the previous season, defeating Camden by 8 points in the Grand Final. This earnt the club promotion to Division 1.

In 2016, Blacktown Magic was rebranded as Western Magic. The club fielded its first under 19s team, who would go on to reach the 2016 Grand Final.

In 2017, the Magic bid farewell to president John Clifford, and Mark Barclay was voted in as his successor.

The Magic won the 2018 AFL Sydney Women's Division 1 Grand Final over the Wollongong Saints.

The women's team was again successful in 2020, winning the AFL Sydney Division 2 Grand Final over St. George under the guidance of Aisha Firmer.

== Club honours ==
=== List of Grand Final Victories ===
Year	Competition	Opponent	Score	Venue
2013	AFL Sydney Division 3	Randwick City Saints	11.11. (77) – 10.6. (66)	Blacktown ISP
2014	AFL Sydney Division 5	Penrith Rams	11.12. (78) – 4.5. (29)	Blacktown ISP
2015	AFL Sydney Men's Division 2	Camden Cats	7.8. (50) – 5.12. (42)	Blacktown ISP
2018	AFL Sydney Women's Division 1	Wollongong Saints	6.4. (40) – 0.4. (4)	Blacktown ISP
2020	AFL Sydney Women's Division 2	St. George Dragons	12.7. (79) – 3.2. (20)	Rosedale Park
