= Neil Brunton =

Australian rules footballer

Personal information
- Born: 3 January 1969 (age 57)
- Original team: Holroyd-Parramatta Blacktown
- Height: 183 cm (6 ft 0 in)
- Weight: 80 kg (176 lb)

Playing career^{1}
Years	Club	Games (Goals)
1991–1995	Sydney Swans	71 (10)
- ^{1} Playing statistics correct to the end of 1995.

Neil Brunton (born 3 January 1969) is a former Australian rules football player with the Sydney Swans of the Australian Football League (AFL). He was plucked from the Sydney AFL competition during the middle of the 1991 season where he was playing with Holroyd-Parramatta Blacktown to make his debut against Geelong in Round 4 at Kardinia Park.

After playing 71 matches for the Swans, Neil was captain-coach of the Campbelltown Football Club leading them to the 1999 Sydney AFL premiership. After a break from coaching, Neil returned to coach Campbelltown at the start of the 2013 season.

== Post-AFL ==
Neil Brunton is currently a primary school teacher at Scots College Brighton-le-sands in Dolls Points NSW.

He is also in a coaching position with the Sydney Swans Academy.
