= Auburn Giants Australian Football Club =

Auburn Giants

Names
- Full name: Auburn Giants Australian Football Club
- Nickname: Giants

AFL Sydney Women's Division 2 2018 season
- Home-and-away season: 5th

Club details
- Founded: 2010
- Dissolved: 2014 (Men's); 2020 (Women's)
- Colours: Orange and Charcoal
- Competition: Sydney AFL
- Ground: Mona Park

Uniforms
Home

Other information
- Official website: auburngiants.com (defunct)

The Auburn Giants Australian Football Club were an Australian rules football club based in the Western Suburbs of Sydney, Australia. The club colours were charcoal and orange and they were nicknamed the Giants. The team had previously been known as the Tigers, and wore yellow and black.

== History ==
Auburn joined the Sydney competition in 2010 embracing the influence set by AFL NSW/ACT to establish another Australian rules football team in the heart of Western Sydney, Auburn.

Auburn's Men's team won the Fourth Division premiers in the Sydney AFL league in their inaugural season, being undefeated for the whole season. The following year they went up two divisions and still made the finals.

In 2011, Auburn became the first team in Sydney to field a women's Australian rules team in Western Sydney. This women's team was predominantly Muslim.

The majority of the women's team in 2011 had never played Australian rules football before. They lost their first match, being held scoreless by Sydney University.

In 2014, the women's team were renamed the Giants.

The men's team (the Tigers) folded before the end of 2014, though the women's team continued to play. In 2015, the Giants played the curtain raser for a game between Greater Western Sydney and Collingwood at the MCG.

The last season Auburn Gitants played was the AFL Sydney Women's Division 2 in 2018. The club made the Semi-Finals, but were knocked out by Macquarie University. The club continued to have a social media presence until 2020.

== Club identity and culture ==
=== Guernseys ===
The club's last home gurensey was based on that of Greater Western Sydney. They had originally worn kits based on Richmond.

==== Uniform evolution ====
| Auburn Tigers (2010-2013) | Auburn Giants (2014-2015) | Auburn Giants (2016-2018) |

== Seasons ==
=== AFL Sydney Women's Division Two ===
Auburn Giants AFL Sydney Women's Division 2 seasons
| Year | No. | P | W | D | L | % |
|---|---|---|---|---|---|---|
| 2014 | 5th | 16 | 7 | 0 | 9 | 77.22 |
| 2015 | 2nd | 14 | 10 | 0 | 4 | 199.38 |
| 2018 | 5th | 16 | 8 | 0 | 8 | 95.33 |
