= Parramatta Australian Football Club =

Parramatta Goannas

Names
- Full name: Parramatta Goannas Australian Football Club
- Nickname: Goannas

AFL Sydney Women's Premier Division 2026 season
- Home-and-away season: 8th

Club details
- Founded: 1979; 47 years ago
- Colours: Blue and Gold
- Competition: AFL Sydney
- President: Justin Cunneen
- Premierships: AFL Sydney Men's Premier Division (1): 1990
- Ground: Gipps Road Oval

Uniforms
Home	Away

The Parramatta Australian Football Club, previously known as Holroyd-Parramatta, is an Australian rules football club based in the Western Suburbs of Sydney, Australia. The club colours are blue and yellow and they are nicknamed the Goannas. They currently have six teams competeing in the AFL Sydney leagues: Men's Division One, Men’s Division Three; and Women’s Premier Division, Women's Division 1, Women’s Division 2 and Under 20’s.

The Goannas home ground is Gipps Road Oval located in the western Sydney suburb of Greystanes, part of the local city of Holroyd.

== History ==
The club formed in 1979 as Parramatta with a senior team instigated in 1980. The club changed its name to Holroyd-Parramatta in 1983 before a merger with Blacktown in 1995. In 2020, the team changed its name to Parramatta Goannas.

In 1985 the Goannas were admitted to Sydney football's primary competition, the Sydney Football League. The Goannas finished their first season second last on the ladder with only two wins against Bankstown and Newtown. The club consistently finished low on the ladder until 1989, where they finished 5th, only just missing finals.

With former Richmond player Ron Thomas at the helm the side qualified for the 1990 finals in second spot behind North Shore before winning the second semi final by 31 points. In the grand final a fortnight later it again met North Shore and, in a spiteful, tempestuous match at the Erskineville Oval, won its first and only SFL pennant by 7 points. Final scores were Holroyd-Parramatta 9.15 (69) defeated North Shore 9.8 (62), with Brian ‘Alf' Hawke courageously seeing out the entire game for the victors despite sustaining a broken jaw early on. The Goannas retained the nucleus of their premiership side in 1991, but on this occasion fell at the final hurdle. The premiership team included future Sydney Swan player Neil Brunton. The premiership decider featured the same teams as in 1990 and was, if anything, an even more bruising and unpleasant encounter, with the Goannas, despite having only fifteen fit men, doing well to get within a goal during the last term before ultimately going down by 22 points.

On 22 May 1990 the Goannas played the curtain raiser for the Australian rules State of Origin. They defeated Sydney University 15.20 (110) to 5.9 (39).

In 1995, the club decided that it was being over-stretched in the SFL, and took the opportunity of merging with struggling SFA club, Blacktown. In 1995, the club decided that it was being over-stretched in the SFL, and took the opportunity of merging with struggling SFA club, Blacktown. The newly merged club would compete in the SFA, the highlight of this period being a 14.10 (94) to 11.11 (77) grand final defeat of Wollongong in 2001.

in 2018, the Goannas became home to its inaugural women's team in AFL Sydney's Women's Division 2 competition. The ladies of 2018 went on to win the flag that year in a comprehensive 7.8.50-1.5.11 win over Camden Cats - a quickly established rivalry that still exists. In 2019, the Goannas ladies expanded to include a new Division 3 team as the 2018 premiers were promoted to Division 1. After finishing Minor Premiers, Division 2 went down in a hard-fought battle against the St George Dragons in the grand final. 2020 was the Goannas ladies most dominant year finishing Minor Premiers after an unbeaten season and a hard-to-believe winning percentage of 817.65%. Continuing the rivalry against Camden Cats, the Goannas won the Grand Final 4.10 (34) - 0.1 (1) to finish 2020 Division 1 Premiers.

Arguably the Goannas' most famous player was Mark Taylor, who won the club's best and fairest award in 1983, and later went on to captain the Australian Test cricket team. Taylor is the current club patron of the Goannas.

2025 saw an existential crisis for the club due to financial troubles. The club was able to raise enough money avoid folding through the Save the Goannas appeal.

== Club honours ==
=== List of Grand Final Victories ===
Year	Competition	Opponent	Score	Venue
1984	Sydney Football Association Under 20			
1990	NSW State Football League First Grade	North Shore Bombers	9.15 (69) – 9.8 (62)	Erskineville Oval
1991	Sydney Football League Reserve Grade			
1991	Sydney Football Association Under 20			
2001	Sydney Football Association First Grade	Wollongong Saints	14.10 (94) – 11.11 (77)	
2018	AFL Sydney Women's Division Two	Camden Cats	7.8 (50) – 1.5 (11)	Blacktown International Sportspark
2019*	AFL Sydney Under 19s Division Two	North Shore Bombers	6.12 (48) – 1.4 (10)	Blacktown International Sportspark
2020	AFL Sydney Women's Division One	Camden Cats	4.10 (34) – 0.1 (1)	Rosedale Park

^{*} This Premiership was won by West Goannas, a merger of Inner West Magpies and Parramatta Goannas.

== Individual honours ==
=== Phelan Medal winners ===
The Phelan Medal is awarded to the best player in the AFL Sydney Men's Premier Division (formerly the Sydney Football League) during the home-and-away season as voted by the umpires:

- Michael Porta (1989)

=== AFL Players ===
The following players have played in the Australian Football League:

- Neil Brunton (Sydney Swans)
- Sanford Wheeler (Sydney Swans)
