= Michael Hartley (footballer) =

Australian rules footballer

Personal information
- Full name: Michael Hartley
- Born: 7 June 1993 (age 33); Sydney, NSW, Australia
- Original teams: Penrith, Coburg (VFL)
- Draft: No. 87, 2012 rookie draft
- Debut: Round 2, 2016, Essendon vs. Melbourne, at Melbourne Cricket Ground
- Height: 198 cm (6 ft 6 in)
- Weight: 102 kg (225 lb)
- Position: Defender

Playing career^{1}
Years	Club	Games (Goals)
2012–2013	Collingwood	0 (0)
2016–2019	Essendon	44 (1)
2020–2021	Hawthorn	5 (1)
Total		49 (2)
- ^{1} Playing statistics correct to the end of 2021.

Michael Hartley (born 7 June 1993) is a professional Australian rules footballer who most recently played for the Hawthorn Football Club in the Australian Football League (AFL).

== Early life ==
An athletic youngster who excelled in a range of sports, including cricket, basketball and athletics but most notably high jump where he was ranked third in Australia at the age of 12. First played Australian Football as a fifteen-year-old for Penrith. He was signed by Collingwood as an NSW Scholarship player at the age of 16. Hartley was originally recruited to the club via the NSW Scholarship program in 2007. He represented NSW at the 2011 U18 National Championships, where he impressed Collingwood enough for them to Rookie listed him with selection No. 87 in the Rookie Draft.

== Collingwood (2012-2013) ==
Hartley spent 2 years on Collingwood's rookie list. Hartley played five games at VFL level before injuring a shoulder that forced him to miss the rest of the 2012 season. He required more surgery to both shoulders and missed the entire 2013 season but was delisted that year.

After his stint at Collingwood, Hartley had played two seasons for Coburg. In 2015 he won the club's best and fairest and was selected in the VFL team of the year.

== Essendon ==
He was recruited by the Essendon Football Club with the 68th overall selection in the 2015 national draft.

He made his debut in round 2 of the 2016 AFL season in the club's win against Melbourne at the Melbourne Cricket Ground. He kicked his first AFL goal in the win. He played 19 games in his first season with the club, taking advantage of the season-long bans inflicted because of the Essendon Football Club supplements saga. He played 17 matches out of the possible 23 Essendon matches in 2017.

After only managing 7 games at AFL level in 2018 and 2019. Hartley was offered a one-year contract extension to remain with the Bombers; he declined this offer to explore his opportunities elsewhere. He was selected by Hawthorn in the 2019 preseason draft.

== Hawthorn ==
At the conclusion of the 2019 AFL Premiership season, Hartley turned down Essendon's offer of a one-year contract. Instead opting to try his luck in the preseason draft, where he was drafted to the Hawthorn Football Club and given a two-year deal.

Hartley was assigned guernsey number 27 for the 2020 season.

Hartley was delisted at the end of the 2021 season.

== Statistics ==
Legend
G	Goals	K	Kicks	D	Disposals	T	Tackles
B	Behinds	H	Handballs	M	Marks

Season	Team	No.	Games	Totals							Averages (per game)							Votes
Season	Team	No.	Games	G	B	K	H	D	M	T	G	B	K	H	D	M	T	Votes
2012	Collingwood	47	0	—	—	—	—	—	—	—	—	—	—	—	—	—	—	0
2013	Collingwood	47	0	—	—	—	—	—	—	—	—	—	—	—	—	—	—	0
2016	Essendon	36	19	1	1	117	71	188	77	59	0.1	0.1	6.2	3.7	9.9	4.1	3.1	0
2017	Essendon	36	18	0	0	122	90	212	87	45	0.0	0.0	6.8	5.0	11.8	4.8	2.5	0
2018	Essendon	36	4	0	0	35	15	50	21	6	0.0	0.0	8.8	3.8	12.5	5.3	1.5	0
2019	Essendon	36	3	0	0	28	15	43	17	6	0.0	0.0	9.3	5.0	14.3	5.7	2.0	0
2020 (Note: The 2020 season was played with 17 home-and-away matches per team (down from 22) and 16-minute quarters with time on (down from 20-minute quarters with time on) due to the impact of the COVID-19 pandemic.)	Hawthorn	27	2	0	0	20	8	28	3	5	0.0	0.0	10.0	4.0	14.0	1.5	2.5	0
2021	Hawthorn	27	3	1	1	39	17	56	14	5	0.3	0.3	13.0	5.7	18.7	4.7	1.7	0
Career			49	2	2	361	216	577	219	126	0.0	0.0	7.4	4.4	11.8	4.5	2.6	0
