= Camden Cats Senior Australian Football Club =

Camden Cats

Names
- Full name: Camden Cats Senior Australian Football Club
- Nickname: Cats
- Motto: Pride - Passion - Respect

2023 season

Club details
- Founded: 1982; 44 years ago
- Colours: Dark Blue White
- Competition: AFL Sydney
- President: Shane Doherty
- Coach: Mark Maher & James Dixon
- Captain: Mitchell Sapiatzer
- Ground: Fairfax Reserve

Uniforms
Home

Other information
- Official website: camdencats.com.au

Camden Cats Senior Australian Football Club is an Australian rules football club based in the Sydney suburb of Harrington Park. The club colours are blue and white and they are nicknamed the Cats.

== History ==
Prior to 2008 Camden participated in the AFL South Coast league. After travel times became too high, Camden moved to the AFL Sydney.

In 2012, the Cats were recipients of the NSW Government's Community Building Partnership program. The club was awarded a $10'000 to improve the floodlights at their home ground, Fairfax Reserve. In 2013, the team fielded their first under 18s side. This was part of a plan by then club president, James Glynn, to form a stonger pathway for junior footballers in the area through the Cats and on to the GWS Giants.

In 2015 the Cats made the AFL Sydney Division 2 Grand Final. They narrowly defeated Manly Giants by a single point in the preliminary final. The Cats however would go on to be defeated by Blacktown Magic 7.8 (50) to 5.12 (42).
