= Macquarie University AFC =

Macquarie University

Names
- Full name: Macquarie University Australian Football Club
- Nickname: Warriors
- Club song: Join in the Chorus

Club details
- Founded: 1969; 57 years ago
- Colours: Black, red, magenta, white
- Competition: Sydney AFL
- President: Steven Clayton
- Ground: Roger Sheeran Oval

Uniforms
Home	Away

Other information
- Official website: muafc.club

Macquarie University Australian Football Club is an Australian rules football club based in Sydney, Australia. The club colours are black, red and white and they are nicknamed the Warriors. Macquarie Uni participates in Division One of the Sydney AFL league. Teams also play in third Division, and Under 18s second Division. The women's team plays in Division one, after being promoted following their undefeated premiership season in 2013.

== History ==
Formerly known under the moniker of the Kookaburras, Macquarie University AFC dates back to 1969, two years after Macquarie University had been established. Up until 2009 the club played in a green and yellow strip but changed to its current colors of black, red and white for the 2010 season. In 2018 to align with the university's branding their colors changed to black, red, magenta and white.

== Current teams ==
Men's Platinum Division
Men's Platinum Division Reserves
Men's Division 3
Women's Premier Division
Women's Division 2

Premierships: Men's - 1998, 1999, 2000, and 2009. Women's - 2013 and 2019

Mostyn Medallists: Amanda Farrugia 2015, 2017 and 2019. Philippa Smyth 2018

== Notable players ==
- Amanda Farrugia (GWS GIANTS)
- Ellie Brush (GWS GIANTS)
- Emma Swanson (GWS GIANTS)
- Philippa Smyth (GWS GIANTS)
