= Manly Warringah Wolves =

Manly Warringah

Names
- Full name: Manly Warringah Australian Football Club
- Nickname: Wolves
- Club song: We are the Mighty Wolves

AFL Sydney 2025 Men's Premier Division season
- Home-and-away season: 1st (Minor Premiers)

Club details
- Founded: 1969; 57 years ago
- Colours: Maroon and White
- Competition: AFL Sydney
- Premierships: AFL Sydney Men's Premier Division (2); 2013, 2014; AFL Sydney Women's Premier Division (1); 2020
- Ground: Weldon Oval (capacity: 5,000)

Uniforms
Home

Other information
- Official website: manlywolves.com

The Manly-Warringah Australian Football Club are an Australian rules football club that play in the Sydney AFL Premier League and is the only senior club located on Sydney's northern beaches. The club colours are maroon and white. The Wolves' have men's teams in Premier Division, Premier Division Reserves, Division 2 and a Division 1 under 19's team. In the Women's competition, the Wolves field a Division 1 and a Division 3 side in 2019.

Manly Warringah's home ground is Weldon Oval located in the northern Sydney suburb of Harbord.

== History ==
=== Foundation and SFA years (1969 - 2012) ===
The Manly-Warringah Wolves were formed in 1969. Founding members Harry Marston, George Klause and Bruce Hutton discovered enough interest on the northern beaches for an Australian rules football team to be formed. The club started in the Sydney Football League Under-20 competition. In 1970 Manly-Warringah joined the newly formed Sydney District Association. The formation of this competition was the culmination of several clubs’ efforts, none more so than Manly, and in particular Harry Marston.

The Wolves have been a dominant performer in the AFL Sydney First Division, formerly known as the Sydney Football Association (SFA). Manly-Warringah won premierships at that level in 1985, 1990, 1995, 1996, 2007, 2011, and 2012. The Wolves had an undefeated season in 2012 with percentage of 564.03. They also had an astonishing average winning margin of over one hundred points per game.

=== Promotion to Premier Division (2013 - Present) ===
After Division One premierships in 2011 and 2012, the 2013 season saw the Manly Warringah Wolves promoted to the Sydney AFL Premier Division for the first time in their history. The Wolves won their first game in the Sydney AFL Premier Division 159 - 42 against 2012 grand finalist, Balmain Dockers. The wolves had a dream start in the premier division winning 9 straight games to start the season. The wolves finished 2013 with the minor premiership. The wolves had the first week off in the semi-finals before beating St George Dragons 85 - 67 to qualify for the grand final and earn a week off. The wolves faced Pennant Hills in the grand final and ran out winners 80 - 72. They are the first team in Sydney AFL history to win the grand final after being promoted to the Premier Division.

Season 2014 saw the dawn of a new era, in which the Wolves formed an Alliance with the Greater Western Sydney Giants, in turn changing the name from the Manly Wolves to the Manly Giants. It was a significant development for Australian rules football on the northern beaches. On the field the success in the Men's Premier Division continued with the wolves having a dominant season winning a second premiership having only losing one game for the season. This year also marked the establishment of Manly-Warringah's first ever female team. Alisa Kelley, rallied up enough interest to form the first ever senior women's AFL team on the Northern Beaches. The team was entered into the Division 2 AFL Sydney competition and finished 6th in their maiden season.

Moving into 2016 and the club was renamed back to the original "Manly-Warringah Wolves".

In 2018, the Wolves were successful in entering in a second women's team into the AFL Sydney Competition. In 2018, the club fielded women's teams in Division 1 and Division 2. After a successful 2018 campaign for Division 1, the team remains in this league in 2019 and are a strong top 4 team. The Division 2 side has been relegated to Division 3 for 2019.

In 2027 Manly Warringah will compete alongside eight other AFL Sydney Premier Division teams in the Sydney Football League.

== Club honours ==
Premierships
Competition	Level	Wins	Years won
AFL Sydney Men's	Premier Division	2	2013, 2014
AFL Sydney Men's	Division One	7	1985, 1990, 1995, 1996, 2007, 2011, 2012
AFL Sydney Men's	Division Two	1	2025
AFL Sydney Men's	Division Three	1	2022
AFL Sydney Men's	Division Five	1	2025
AFL Sydney Women's	Premier Division	1	2020
Finishing positions
AFL Sydney Men's; Premier Division	Minor premiership	2	2013, 2014,
AFL Sydney Men's; Premier Division	Grand Finalist	3	2024, 2025, 2026 (HA!)
AFL Sydney Women's; Premier Division	Minor premiership	2	2020, 2025
AFL Sydney Women's; Premier Division	Grand Finalist	2	2022, 2024

=== List of Grand Final Victories ===
Year	Competition	Opponent	Score	Venue
1985	Sydney Football Association First Grade			
1990	Sydney Football Association First Grade			
1995	Sydney Football Association First Grade	UNSW	20.20 (140) – 6.6 (42)	Rosedale Oval
1996	Sydney Football Association First Grade	UNSW	22.17 (155) – 11.9 (75)	Gipps Road Oval
2007	AFL Sydney First Division	Southern Power	10.14 (74) – 9.9 (63)	Kelso Oval
2011	AFL Sydney Division One	Southern Power	7.13 (55) – 6.9 (45)	Blacktown International Sportspark
2012	AFL Sydney Division One	Southern Power	11.15 (81) – 9.2 (56)	Blacktown International Sportspark
2013	AFL Sydney Premier Division	Pennant Hills	11.14 (80) – 11.6. (72)	Blacktown International Sportspark
2014	AFL Sydney Premier Division	Pennant Hills	11.14. (80) – 8.20. (68)	Blacktown International Sportspark
2020	AFL Sydney Women's Premier Division	Inner West Magpies	6.10. (46) – 4.1. (25)	Kanebridge Oval

== Individual honours ==
=== Phelan Medal winners ===
The Phelan Medal is awarded to the best player in the AFL Sydney Men's Premier Division during the home-and-away season as voted by the umpires:

- Tyrone Armitage (2013)
- Connor Pettersson (2015)
- Kale Gabila (2023)

=== Snow Medal winners ===
The Snow Medal is awarded to the best player in the AFL Sydney Men’s Division Two during the home-and-away season as voted by the umpires:

- Tim Anderson (1992)

=== Mostyn Medal winners ===
The Mostyn Medal is awarded to the best player in the AFL Sydney Women's Premier Division during the home-and-away season as voted by the umpires:

- Hannah Woolf (2024, 2025)

=== AFLW Players ===
The following players have played in the AFL Women's:

- Libby Graham (GWS and Richmond)
