= Randwick City Saints AFC =

Randwick City Saints

Names
- Full name: Randwick City Saints Australian Football Club
- Nickname: Saints
- Club song: Oh when the Saints go marching in

2026 season

Club details
- Founded: 2010; 16 years ago
- Colours: black white red
- Competition: AFL Sydney
- President: William Yates
- Coach: Senior Men's: Heath Northey & Wilson Thomas Senior Women's: Dan Ford; Reserves Men's: David King Reserves Women’s: Aaron Tees
- Captain(s): Senior Men's: Jack Sorenson Senior Women's:Ciara McNamara; Reserves Men's: Allan Donohoe Reserves Women's: Trudy Smith
- Premierships: AFL Sydney Men's Division One (1): 2023; AFL Sydney Women's Division One (1): 2025
- Ground: Pioneers Park (capacity: 53,430)

Uniforms
Home

Other information
- Official website: randwicksaints.com

Randwick City Saints Australian Football Club (previously known as Saints AFC) is an Australian rules football club based in Sydney, Australia. The Saints play in the AFL Sydney competition. The Maroubra Saints junior AFL club are a local junior feeder club.

The Saints home ground is Pioneers Park located in the south-eastern Sydney suburb of Malabar.

== History ==
Saints Australian Football Club was founded in 2010. In December 2012 the name of the club was changed to Randwick City Saints AFC. In 2013 the club first fielded a women's team, becoming the twelfth team in the competition.

The Senior side were runners up in 2013. The Reserve Grade side won the Division Five premiership in 2013 under captain/coach Peter Conduit.

The Club won its first senior premiership, winning the 2014 Division 3 flag against Penrith.

In 2023 after a huge influx of new women's and men's players the Saints entered two men's and two women's teams for the first time. All four teams made finals, Men's reserves fell one game short of the grand final, men's seniors and both women's teams made the Grand Final.

== Club identity and culture ==
=== Guernseys ===
The club wears gurnseys similar to St Kilda in the colours of black, white and red.

==== Uniform evolution ====
2010 - 2017	2018 - present

== Club honours ==
Premierships
Competition	Level	Wins	Years won
AFL Sydney Men's	Division One	1	2023
AFL Sydney Men's	Division Three	1	2014
AFL Sydney Men's	Division Five	2	2013, 2024
AFL Sydney Women's	Division One	1	2025
AFL Sydney Women's	Division Two	1	2023
AFL Sydney Women's	Division Four	1	2023
