= Moorebank Sports Magpies =

Names
- Full name: Moorebank Sports Magpies Australian Football Club
- Nickname: Magpies

Club details
- Founded: 1996
- Colours: white black gold
- Competition: AFL Sydney
- President: Mark Coles
- Coach: Chris Hunt
- Ground: Rosedale Park

Uniforms
Home

The Moorebank Sports Magpies Australian Football Club (formerly, the South West Sydney Australian Football Club) is an Australian rules football club based in the South Western Suburbs of Sydney. Nicknamed the Magpies, they currently have teams in the Second Division, Fourth Division, Fifth Division, Women's Division and Under 19s of the Sydney AFL league.

Moorebank's home ground is Rosedale Park located in the south-western Sydney suburb of Warwick Farm.
