= UTS Australian Football Club =

Names
- Full name: University of Technology, Australian Football Club
- Nickname(s): Bats, Batters

AFL Sydney Premier Division 2026 season
- Home-and-away season: Men's: 6th Women's: 5th

Club details
- Founded: 2000; 26 years ago
- Colours: Black and Green
- Competition: Sydney AFL
- President: Adrian Sibbick
- Coach: Dean Cleary
- Ground: Trumper Park Oval; Waverely Oval, Bondi

Uniforms
| Home | Away |

Other information
- Official website: utsafc.com.au

The University of Technology Australian Football Club (mostly known as the UTS Australian Football Club), nicknamed as the Bats (and the women's team formerly known as the Shamrocks), is an Australian rules football club based in the eastern suburbs of Sydney. It competes in the AFL Sydney. The club is affiliated with the University of Technology, Sydney.

The Bats play their home games at Trumper Park Oval in Paddington, New South Wales, and at Waverley Oval in Bondi, New South Wales. They train at Trumper Park Oval in Paddington and Bat and Ball Oval in Moore Park, New South Wales.

== History ==
=== Men's football ===
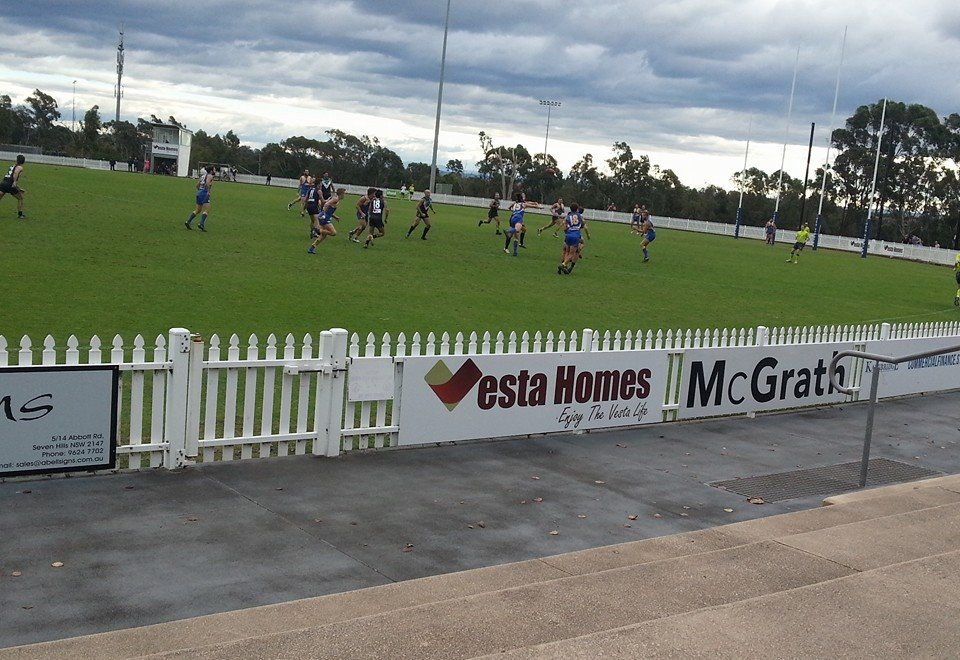
UTS Bats play East Coast Eagles in the AFL Sydney Men's Premier Division, round 3 2015

The UTS Bars were founded in 2000 by Marty Lynch, a University of Technology, Sydney student at the time, adopting the "Bats" nickname as a result of an initial sponsorship from Bacardi Rum.The Bats enjoyed success in their first year, with the Division Two side winning the premiership. In 2004 the club was coached by former Balmain player Roger Moten, and was actively seeking to recruit players from the Royal Australian Navy.

In 2011 the UTS Bats were elevated to the AFL Sydney Premier Division, though struggled in their initial seasons, including a wooden spoon in 2014.

=== Women's football ===
In 2001 UTS established a women's team to play in the AFL Sydney, however the club folded in 2006, and subsequent attempts to re-establish it met with failure. In 2008 the Bondi Shamrocks, named so due to a large number of Irish expatriates on the team, were founded. The Shamrocks played in the AFL Sydney's Women's competition for the first time in 2009.

By 2016 the Bondi Shamrocks had become the UTS Shamrocks, and won their first Grand Final, defeating Wollongong Saints 5.5 (35) to 3.2 (20). Following this victory the Shamrocks were elevated to the Women's Premier Division. In 2019 the Shamrocks were renammed the Bats, so that all UTS AFL clubs were playing under the same name. In 2023 the Women's Premier Division side were minor premiers and Grand Finalists, though were defeated by East Coast Eagles 8.8 (56) to 1.6 (12). Former Kildare player Gillian Behan, was UTS' sole goal scorer for the match.

In 2027 UTS Bats men's and women's teams will compete alongside eight other AFL Syndey Premier Division teams in the Sydney Football League.

=== Intervarsity football ===
The club participates in inter-varsity football at both the state and national level. The club has competed at every Australian University Games since 1998.

== Club honours ==
Premierships
| Competition | Level | Wins | Years won |
| AFL Sydney Men's | Division One | 5 | 2006, 2008, 2009, 2010, 2016 |
| AFL Sydney Men's | Division One Reserves | 4 | 2004, 2006, 2007, 2008 |
| AFL Sydney Men's | Division Two | 2 | 2000, 2002 |
| AFL Sydney Men's | Division Three | 1 | 2023 |
| AFL Sydney Men's | Division Four | 2 | 2014, 2016 |
| AFL Sydney Men's | Division Five | 2 | 2015, 2025 |
| AFL Sydney Men's | Masters | 2 | 2023, 2024 |
| AFL Sydney Women's | Division One | 2 | 2016, 2024 |
Finishing positions
| AFL Sydney Men's; Premier Division | Wooden spoons | 3 | 2014, 2019, 2020 |
| AFL Sydney Women's; Premier Division | Minor premiership | 1 | 2023 |
| AFL Sydney Women's; Premier Division | Grand Finalist | 1 | 2023 |
| AFL Sydney Women's; Premier Division | Wooden spoons | 1 | 2018 |

== Individual honours ==
=== Mostyn Medal winners ===
The Mostyn Medal is awarded to the best player in the AFL Sydney Women's Premier Division during the home-and-away season as voted by the umpires:

- Claudia Gunjaca (2020)

=== AFLW Players ===
The following UTS Bats or Bondi Shamrocks players have played in the AFL Women's:

- Claudia Gunjaca (Geelong Cats)

== Seasons ==
| Premiers | Grand Finalist | Minor premiers | Wooden spoon |

=== AFL Sydney Men's Premier Division ===
UTS Bats AFL Sydney Men's Premier Division seasons
| Year | No. | P | W | D | L | % |
|---|---|---|---|---|---|---|
| 2011 | 10th | 18 | 3 | 0 | 15 | 60.38 |
| 2012 | 6th | 18 | 11 | 0 | 7 | 112.17 |
| 2013 | 8th | 18 | 8 | 1 | 9 | 93.67 |
| 2014 | 10th | 18 | 3 | 1 | 14 | 65.62 |
| 2015 | 6th | 16 | 6 | 0 | 10 | 82.69 |
| 2016 | 3rd | 16 | 11 | 0 | 5 | 116.90 |
| 2017 | 7th | 16 | 6 | 0 | 10 | 78.67 |
| 2018 | 9th | 18 | 4 | 0 | 14 | 59.95 |
| 2019 | 10th | 18 | 3 | 0 | 15 | 56.77 |
| 2020* | 10th* | 9* | 0* | 0* | 9* | 19.94* |
| 2021* | 7th* | 10* | 4* | 0* | 6* | 76.9* |
| 2022 | 7th | 15 | 5 | 0 | 10 | 59.90 |
| 2023 | 8th | 16 | 3 | 0 | 13 | 54.90 |

^{*} The 2020 and 2021 seasons were affected by the COVID-19 pandemic in New South Wales

=== AFL Sydney Women's Premier Division ===
UTS Shamrocks/UTS Bats AFL Sydney Women's Premier Division seasons
| Year | No. | P | W | D | L | % |
|---|---|---|---|---|---|---|
| 2017 | 7th | 17 | 4 | 1 | 12 | 40.13 |
| 2018 | 8th | 17 | 4 | 0 | 13 | 57.89 |
| 2019 | 6th | 17 | 4 | 0 | 13 | 44.13 |
| 2020* | 8th* | 9* | 1* | 1* | 7* | 34.18* |
| 2021* | 8th* | 10* | 3* | 0* | 7* | 47.30* |
| 2022 | 6th | 16 | 9 | 0 | 7 | 105.86 |
| 2023 | 1st | 16 | 15 | 0 | 1 | 349.35 |
| 2024 | 6th | 16 | 9 | 0 | 7 | 167.27 |
| 2025 | 6th | 16 | 8 | 0 | 8 | 164.01 |
| 2026 | 5th | 16 | 8 | 0 | 8 | 98.46 |

^{*} The 2020 and 2021 seasons were affected by the COVID-19 pandemic in New South Wales
