= AFL Sydney =

Australian rules football competition in Sydney, Australia

- Most recent season or competition: 2025
- Sport: Australian rules football
- Founded: 12 February 1903; 123 years ago
- No. of teams: 22
- Region: New South Wales
- Most recent champions: Men's Premier Division: North Shore Bombers Women's Premier Division: North Shore Bombers
- Website: sydneyafl.com.au

AFL Sydney is an Australian rules football competition based in metropolitan Sydney. Founded in 1903, the competition was originally known as the NSW Australian Football Association, before being renamed the Sydney Football League in 1980, then Sydney AFL in 1988 before eventually adopting its current name in 2009. The league comprises more than 100 teams representing 26 clubs which play across seven senior men's divisions, five women's divisions, a Master's Division and two under 19 men's competitions (as of 2023).
The competition is technically Sydney's division of the NSWAFL

== History ==
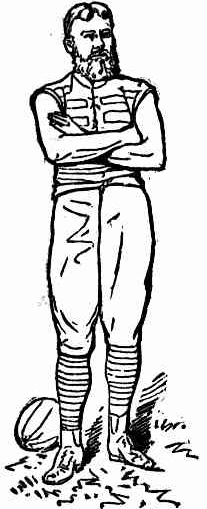
Harry Hedger, former Waratahs Southern Rugby Union player who founded the NSWFA in Sydney in 1880, was also a key player in the founding of the NSWFL in 1903 and elected its first life member in 1905.

Australian Rules football has been played in Sydney since 1866 however organised competition did not commence until the formation of the first New South Wales Football Association which operated between 1880 and 1894 and included East Sydney and Sydney FC (both founded 1880) as well as Sydney's oldest Australian rules club Sydney University (founded 1887).

=== New South Wales Football Association / New South Wales Football League: 1903–1950 ===
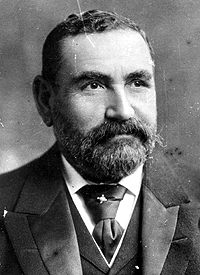
John See, Premier of New South Wales, first president of the NSWFA

After a decade in hiatus a new governing body was formed under the same name in 1903 as the New South Wales Football Association on 12 February 1903 at a meeting held in the YMCA Hall in George Street. The competition was known as the New South Wales Football League. John See, Premier of New South Wales was elected the NSWFL's first president, and along with Phillip Sheridan of the Sydney Cricket Ground trust who was elected president of the NSWFA, helped to secure access to enclosed grounds for club and interstate matches.

11 clubs contested the opening season in 1903 (including: East Sydney FC, Ashfield Electorate FC, North Shore FC, North Sydney FC, South Sydney FC, YMCA FC, Paddington FC, Redfern FC, West Sydney FC, Newtown FC, Sydney FC and Balmain FC), with East Sydney taking out the first premiership with a 6-point win over North Shore.

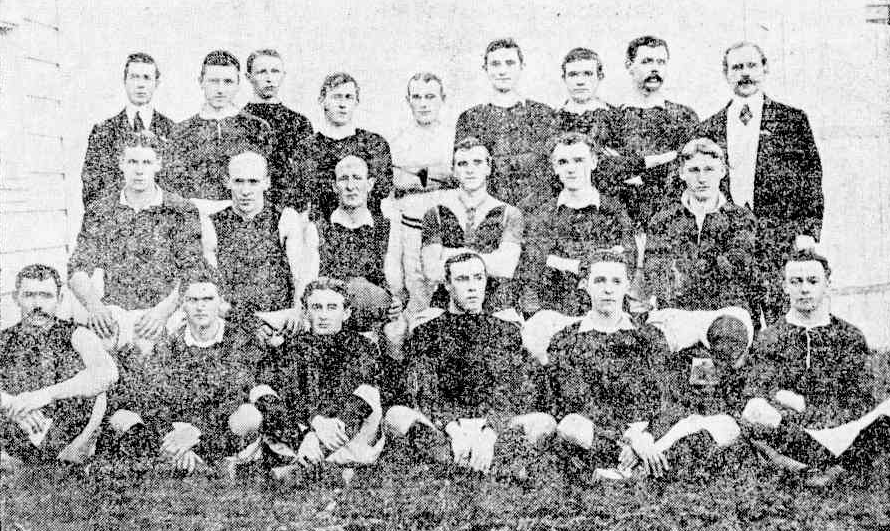
YMCA Football Club in 1909

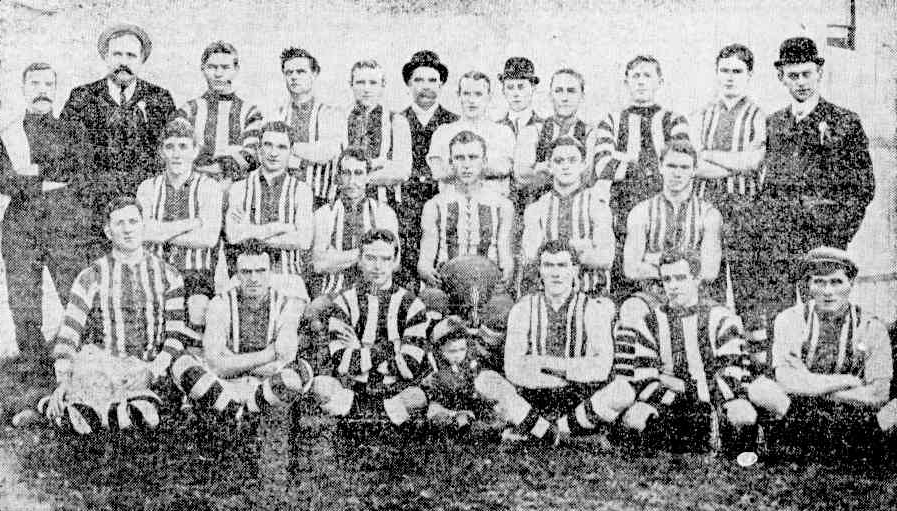
Paddington Football Club in 1909

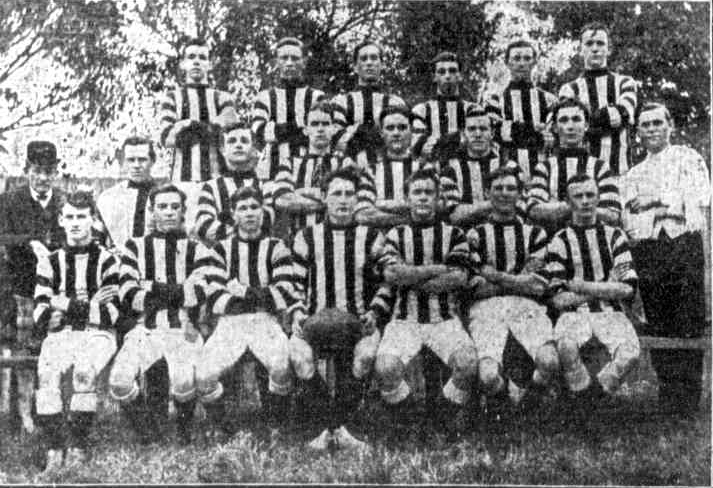
Newtown Football Club in 1911

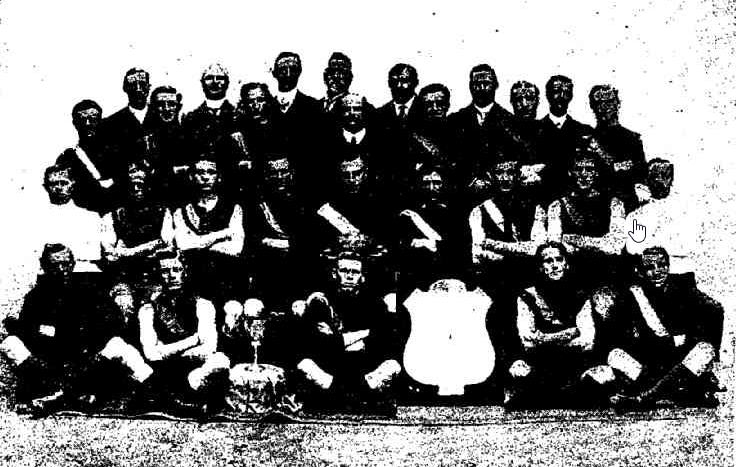
East Sydney Football Club 1911 premiers

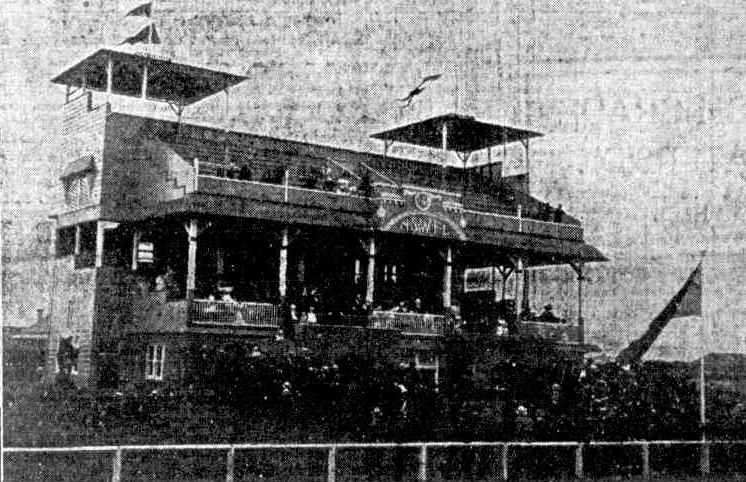
Alexandria grandstand in 1912. The league invested heavily in spectator facilities before being shut out after just a few years and forced to move to smaller grounds without them at Erskineville and Trumper Park.

By the 1920s, popularity had reached a point where the league was charging spectators at the gate and players were being paid with attendance to each match was in the thousands, with games averaging between 4,000 - 6,000. However at the same time rugby league was booming in popularity, dwarfing the popularity of the competition, particularly in representative matches between New South Wales and Queensland, but also at the local level.

In the mid-1920s, the competition was split into two divisions: League and Association. In 1926 the League introduced the District Scheme, which saw clubs merge into district teams, for example East Sydney and Paddington merged to created Eastern Suburbs. Other clubs such as Western Suburbs were created at this time. This meant that, with the exception of Newtown, clubs represented a region of Sydney, rather than a specific suburb. The visiting Richmond commented that this was a sensible move for the league. That year, each of the clubs: Sydney, Newtown, Eastern Suburbs, Western Suburbs, North Shore, and South Sydney had four teams across four grades including an Under 18 team.

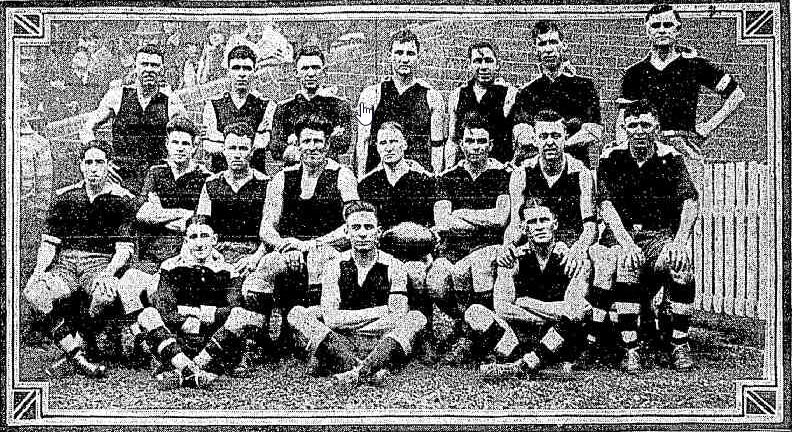
Newtown NSWFL premiers in 1929

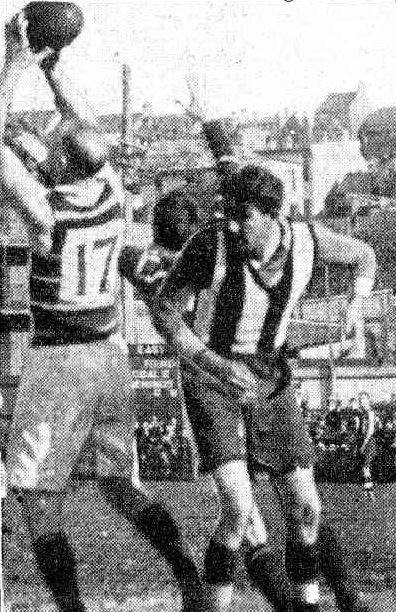
East Sydney vs Newtown at Trumper Park Oval in 1931

During the Second World War, St George, Sydney, and South Sydney, struggled to retain players. The three clubs had primarily relied on players in the armed forces, who were now being deployed. Attendence rates, which had dropped from their highs in 1925, begun to pick back up during the war. In 1945, matches averaged a 25% higher attendence rate than in 1944, and an over 400% increase over pre-1939 games. The highest attended game was a crowd of 5,000 to watch Eastern Suburbs play South Sydney.

=== New South Wales Australian National Football League: 1950–1952 ===
By the 1950s, the competition had become highly popular with crowds for some matches attracting up to 5,000 spectators, however the league noted that there was a lack of juniors with no schools any longer playing the sport. However faced with increasing competition from the rugby league, the competition switched all finals matches to Sundays in 1950. It also faced increasingly bad behaviour of players, which it sought to curb through harsher suspensions. However the tough sanctions resulted in a decrease in players so an amnesty on suspensions was declared in 1952.

=== Sydney Football League: 1980–1997 ===
In 1980 the 'NSW Australian Football Association' became known as the 'Sydney Football League'.

The impact of the introduction to the Sydney Swans into the VFL in 1982 on the Sydney Football League was heavy. By this time the competition had built up a strong following and was semi-professional. That changed with the Swans introduction as supporters left the local competition. Among the casualties was the historic foundation club Newtown which folded in 1987.

=== Sydney AFL: 1998–2008 ===
The league was renamed the 'Sydney AFL' in 1998. The league consisted of 7 teams – Balmain, Pennant Hills, North Shore, St George, East Sydney, Western Suburbs and Baulkham Hills. In 1999, Campbelltown returned to the Sydney AFL after a 3-year stint in AFL Canberra. The Blues, as they were then known, were an exceptionally strong club at the time and dominated the league in their first year back in Sydney. In the grand final, Campbelltown 18.5 (113) were far too good for Balmain 13.13 (91) to take out the premiership by 22 points. In 2000, after the AFL's national reserve grade competition was abolished, the Swans fielded a team in the Sydney AFL, known as the Redbacks. This move didn't turn out to be successful, with the existing clubs unable to compete against full-time professional footballers who had far superior training resources. The games were generally one-sided, to the point where the rules were changed halfway through the season to allow other clubs to field an extra player against the Redbacks. The Redbacks finished top of the ladder, but elected not to compete in the finals; and in their absence Pennant Hills took out their first premiership with a 15.12 (102) to 12.7 (79) win over North Shore in the grand final. During the 2000 season, several Sydney AFL clubs had formed strategic alliances with clubs in the AFL. As part of this, some Sydney AFL clubs were to change their identity over the next few years. North Shore had always been black and red but took on the Bombers nickname of Essendon. St George renamed themselves the St George Crows and began wearing the navy, gold and blue strip of Adelaide. But the biggest change in identity was Baulkham Hills, who changed their colours to blue and gold and took on the new name of the East Coast Eagles. Other clubs were to follow suit. Another change in 2000 was the merger of traditional powerhouse East Sydney with the University of NSW club to form the UNSW-Eastern Suburbs Bulldogs.

In 2001, with the Redbacks concept having not been considered a success, the Swans entered an alliance with Port Melbourne in the VFL and fielded their reserves with Port Melbourne. They continued to field a Redbacks team for the next 2 years, mainly as a junior development and talent-spotting team; but the Redbacks were never to make the top 4 again. Instead it was North Shore who led from start to finish in 2001, and although the grand final was tight the Bombers got critical goals when it mattered to record a 12.12 (84) to 10.9 (69) victory over Campbelltown. The following year saw a resurgent Uni NSW-Eastern Suburbs team return to the top, and despite a strong challenge from North Shore the Bulldogs finished the season as minor premiers. But the Bulldogs would have to go the long way into the grand final after North Shore came from behind to beat them by 3 points in the major semi-final. But UNSW-ES bounced back to win the preliminary final and earn a grand final berth, something that no major-final loser has managed to do in the 4 years since. On grand final day, despite the bright sunshine and perfect conditions, no side was able to score for the first 17 minutes as the defences of both teams held tight. But eventually it was to be North Shore that cracked, and although they fought back in the third term to come into the last break only a few points behind, they never led. Instead, it was UNSW-ES who ran away with the game in the last quarter to record a 16.10 (106) to 11.6 (72) win and their first premiership since the merger. This was the last grand final to be played at Macquarie University. The Redbacks finally withdrew from the Sydney AFL in 2003 and the competition was reduced to 8 teams. North Shore got the season off to a flying start and were undefeated for the first 14 rounds, the Bombers losing only 2 home & away games all season. Campbelltown returned to form early in the season, but after being badly beaten by North Shore at Gore Hill in round 7 they fell away and only just scraped into the finals and have yet to make the finals since. Instead it was St George that came in 2nd, with reigning premiers UNSW-ES coming third. North Shore qualified first for the grand final, while UNSW-ES eliminated Campbelltown. In the prelim final, St George were held goal-less in the second half and for the 4th year in a row had been defeated in the prelim final. And so the grand final in the league's centenary year, which was played at Monarch Oval in Campbelltown, would involve the same teams that played in the first grand final. And the result was to repeat. North Shore went in as the hottest of favourites, but poor kicking and excellent pressure from the Bulldogs saw them pull off a stunning upset. UNSW-ES 12.10 (82) defeated North Shore 10.16 (76), an exact repeat of the very first Sydney AFL grand final.

=== 2004 ===
In 2004, the Sydney AFL adopted Henson Park as its finals venue. In later years, the Marrickville ground which also hosts the Newtown Jets in the NSW Rugby League would play a bigger role in Sydney football and be the venue for representative fixtures and night matches. North Shore were again front-runners, remaining undefeated until the second half of the season and again losing only 2 home & away games. Tennis ace Patrick Rafter played a few reserve grade games for the Bombers during this season but was never picked in the senior team. North Shore finished top after the home & away season, with UNSW-ES finishing 2nd. But this time the Bulldogs were to miss out on a grand final berth and instead St George finally broke through the preliminary final hurdle to qualify for the big day. Having lost the previous 2 grand finals the Bombers were nervous, and even more so when St George led by 4 points at half time. But the Bombers pulled away with the wind in the third term and the Crows were unable to respond when they had the win in the last quarter. So it was North Shore who took out the premiership, with a 10.11 (71) to 7.4 (46) victory. In 2005, the Wollongong Lions were admitted to premier Division, creating a 9-team league. The Lions are well-run off the field, and proved competitive on it. Western Suburbs and Pennant Hills were the leaders for much of the season, Wests remaining undefeated until round 9 and Pennant Hills until round 10. The round 9 loss was to be Wests' only loss in the home & away season. Pennant Hills lost much of their edge after captain Barnaby Howarth suffered a stroke after training and was unable to play again, but bounced back to finish 2nd after the home & away season. Wests and Pennant Hills were a long way in front of other teams and were widely fancied to play in the grand final. Wests made it through in the major semi-final, but in a stunning upset Pennant Hills went down in the preliminary final to reigning premiers North Shore. The Bombers were to turn on an even more stunning upset in the grand final, getting on top after half-time to record a 13.9 (87) to 6.10 (46) win over Wests and take out back-to-back flags. Premier Reserves: UNSW-ES def East Coast Eagles 1st Division Seniors: Sydney Uni Students def UTS Bats 1st Division Reserves: Sydney Uni Students def UTS Bats 2nd Division: Nor-West Jets 10.10 (70) def Sydney Uni Blue 4.11 (34)

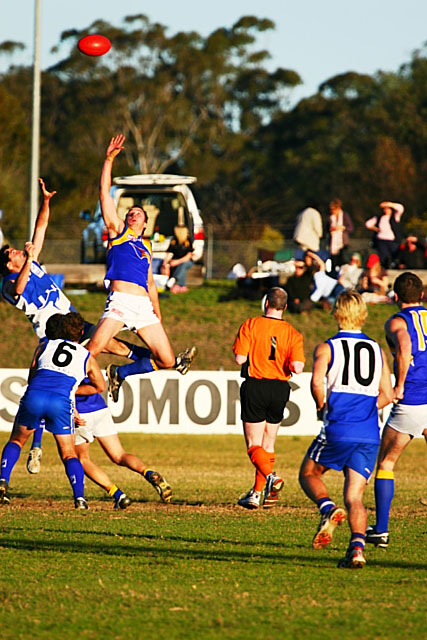
Two ruckmen contest the bounce in a Sydney AFL game between the East Coast Eagles AFC and Campbelltown Kangaroos AFC, 2006.

Before the 2006 season, East Coast Eagles recruited heavily in a bid to get to the top. The Eagles had been close to the finals for years without making it into the top 4, but this was to change in 2006 and the Eagles took all before them in an undefeated home & away season. Sydney's drought had a major bearing on this season, with several grounds being hardened dustbowls and the turf on many grounds going out of shape; so that even small amounts of rain caused puddles to form and the grounds to be closed. All clubs faced rising injury tolls due to the ground conditions. After an undefeated home & away season and an easy win in the major semi-final, East Coast Eagles went into the grand final at Henson Park against Pennant Hills as the hottest of favourites. But this was the day the drought was to break, with conditions more resembling water polo than football. The Eagles' running game was negated by the conditions and by Pennant Hills' pressure tactics, while the Demons' tactic of peppering the goals from a distance and keeping the scoreboard paid dividends. Although the Eagles scored 2 more goals, the constant scoring got Pennant Hills over the line, 5.20 (50) to 7.6 (48). There have been many upsets in recent years in Sydney AFL grand finals, but this one more so than any of the others.

In 2007, Sydney University was re-admitted to Premier Division, making a 10-team competition. 18 home & away rounds were played, with each team playing each other twice; although the first match between North Shore and Balmain was postponed twice, leading to the two clubs playing each other twice within 4 days. Reigning premiers Pennant Hills finished top of the ladder, and were joined in the finals by St George, North Shore and Campbelltown. But the Demons were upset in the major semi-final after St George got off to a flying start and maintained their lead to qualify first for the grand final. Campbelltown made the finals for the first time since 2003, but were no match for North Shore in the minor semi. North Shore maintained their winning form in the prelim final, comfortably accounting for Pennant Hills – the 5th year in a row the loser of the major semi has again lost in the prelim final. Grand final day was fine and warm, and in ideal conditions at Henson Park North Shore led by 15 points at half-time and extended the lead in the third term. But a determined charge by St George closed the gap to just 4 points at three-quarter time. The Crows looked to have the momentum, but North Shore steadied to score the only two goals in the last quarter and record a 12.15 (87) to 9.12 (66) victory. Ryan Davis was awarded the Podbury Medal for best on ground in the grand final. 2008 commenced with a marathon day at Henson Park, in which all five Premier Division Seniors matches for round 1 were played back to back. Bad weather and construction delays meant that East Coast Eagles were unable to move into their new home ground at Bruce Purser Reserve in 2008, but the Eagles put those frustrations behind them to qualify for the finals. Also returning to finals action in 2008 after missing out in 2007 was UNSW-ES, who finished top of the ladder after the home & away season. A five-team finals series was re-introduced for 2008; and reigning premiers North Shore bounced back from a slow start to the season to qualify for the finals. But the Bombers were to go no further than the first week of the finals. Also qualifying for the playoffs were Pennant Hills and St George. East Coast finished 4th after the home & away series, but won three finals matches to qualify for the grand final. Their opponent in the grand final was Pennant Hills. All finals matches were again played at Henson Park except for the second semi-final which was played in wet conditions at North Dalton Park. The grand final was played in 33-degree heat, the hottest grand final day in the history of the Sydney AFL competition. After a tight and low-scoring first half, Pennant Hills took complete control after half-time to cruise to a comprehensive 105-point victory. Pennant Hills' Scott Reed was awarded the Podbury Medal as best on ground, and will join Collingwood's rookie list for 2009.

=== AFL Sydney: 2009–present ===
In 2009, the league became known as 'AFL Sydney', as it is known today. 2009 saw the introduction of a Divisional structure, with promotion and relegation through the lower divisions (see the Divisional Structure section further down this page). 2009 was also notable for the opening of two new football venues in Sydney. Bruce Purser Reserve was opened in February when it hosted an AFL trial match between the Sydney Swans and the Western Bulldogs, and through the course of the year served as the home ground for East Coast Eagles; as well as a backup venue for wet weather, with Pennant Hills, Western Suburbs and North Shore also playing home games at the venue. The Second Semi-Final was also played there. And later in the season, Blacktown Olympic Park began operations, firstly as the venue for the Representative fixture where Sydney AFL defeated AFL Canberra. In August the ground held a spectacular opening ceremony, with fireworks and Aboriginal dance as well as a match between Western Suburbs and Pennant Hills. The venue was then the host for all the finals except for the Second Semi Final. On the field, St George returned to tradition; going back to their traditional red and white colours and the Dragons name, but it was to be a tough year on the field as they missed the finals for the second time this decade. Also missing out on finals action for the second time since the turn of the millennium was North Shore. East Coast Eagles, strengthened by finally having a home ground to call their own, took out the minor premiership and were first to qualify for the Grand Final after a comfortable win over Wests in the Second Semi Final, a match where East Coast's full forward Gus Seebeck kicked his 100th goal for the season. Campbelltown returned to finals action after missing out in 2008, but were eliminated in the first week of finals action. Week 2 saw the demise of reigning premier Pennant Hills; while the Preliminary Final saw UNSW-ES qualify for the Grand Final at the expense of Wests. The Grand Final was played in perfect weather, but was to be a one-sided contest. East Coast took control of the game early and won every quarter to record a comfortable 54-point win. Gus Seebeck kicked 10 goals for the Eagles to win the Podbury Medal.

The following year Sydney Uni, on the back of a 14-game winning streak, were minor premiers. Also finishing in the final five were Wests, East Coast, North Shore and Pennant Hills. East Coast Eagles win back to back premierships, defeating Sydney University in the Grand Final (13.9 – 87) (10.10 – 70). UTSAFC were also admitted to Premier Division. In 2011 UTSAFC finished 10th in their first year in the Premier Division winning 3 games. Campbelltown finished last, failing to win a game. The East Coast Eagles won the minor premiership, joining them in the finals were Balmain, Sydney University, North Shore and Pennant Hills.

The same eleven teams competed in Premier Division in 2012, but with East Coast Eagles (now renamed Sydney Hills Eagles) and Sydney Uni joining the NEAFL, the Premier Division teams for those two clubs were their reserves teams. Neither made the finals, and the Eagles' run of premierships ended after their three-peat from 2009 to 2011. UNSW-ES were the form team of the 2012 season, spearheaded by a Phelan Medal performance from Dane Rampe that would result in him being drafted by the Swans. UNSW-ES finished top of the ladder, and would meet Balmain in the Grand Final. Pennant Hills, North Shore and St George completed the top five. The grand final was played as a twilight match at Blacktown International Sportspark. The lead see-sawed for three-quarters, with the Bulldogs leading by four points at the last change. But a run of seven goals to one in the final term saw the Bulldogs run our comfortable 42-point winners; their first premiership since 2003 and condemning Balmain to their second straight grand final defeat. The 2013 season saw Manly added to Premier Division, making a 12-team competition. This resulted in six games per round in an 18-round home and away season, with not all teams playing each other twice. Manly, the newcomers to the top division, would make an immediate impact as they won their first nine games in Premier Division; shooting straight to the top of the ladder on their way to the minor premiership. Sydney Uni and Sydney Hills Eagles fielded teams in the NEAFL in 2013; with their Premier Division teams being the clubs' reserves teams. Neither qualified for the finals in Premier Division; with the Eagles finishing on the bottom of the ladder. The season was a fall from grace for Balmain. The Dockers, after playing in the last two Grand Finals, crashed down the ladder in 2013; and internal tensions boiled over late in the season as 11 players staged a walk-out after five minutes, causing the club to forfeit a Premier Division clash against Wests. The walk-out was to be the end of Balmain in Premier Division, as AFL Sydney relegated them to Division One for 2014. Also playing their last season in Premier Division this year was Illawarra, after nine years in the top division without a finals appearance and winning only one game this season. This season would also be the last for Auburn Tigers as a men's club, after forfeiting several games in Division Two. However, Auburn would continue as a women's club until 2018. Manly finished the regular season as minor premiers, and defeated St George in the Major Semi-Final to be first team through to the Grand Final. Their opponents in the Grand Final would be Pennant Hills, who finished fourth in the regular season but defeated UNSW-ES, North Shore and St George in the finals to make their way through. The Demons led by eight points at the long break, but the Wolves made the decisive move in the premiership quarter with three goals to one to turn the half time deficit into a six-point lead at three quarter time. The Demons hit the lead early in the last, but the Wolves regained the momentum to regain the lead and take out the Grand Final by eight points; a remarkable achievement in their first season at the top level.

=== 115th birthday season ===
In 2018 AFL Sydney celebrated 115 years of senior football in Sydney, since the 'NSW Australian Football Association' was formed in 1903. In season 2018 the Camden Cats were promoted to the Men's Premier Division to again bring the number of clubs in Sydney's top flight back to 10 after Campbelltown Blues withdrew at the conclusion of the 2014 season. AFL Sydney continues to grow with thirteen Divisions across men's, women's, U19s and Masters Football.

2018 Grand Finals
| | Premier | Premier's Score G.B (T) | Runners-up | Runners-up Score G.B (T) |
|---|---|---|---|---|
| Premier Division | UNSW-Eastern Suburbs Bulldogs | 8.10 (58) | Sydney University Students | 7.13 (55) |
| Premier Division Reserves | Pennant Hills Demons | 7.18 (60) | Sydney University Students | 6.9 (45) |
| Women's Premier Division | UNSW-Eastern Suburbs Bulldogs | 7.3 (45) | Macquarie University | 3.4 (22) |
| Platinum Division | Penrith Rams | 8.10 (58) | Western Magic | 6.5 (41) |
| Platinum Division Reserves | Southern Power | 9.5 (59) | Macquarie University | 7.8 (50) |
| Men's Division 1 | Pennant Hills Demons | 8.6 (54) | Sydney University Students | 6.10 (46) |
| Men's Division 2 | UNSW-Eastern Suburbs Bulldogs | 6.9 (45) | Sydney University Students | 4.3 (27) |
| Men's Division 3 | Sydney University Students | 7.12 (54) | Camden Cats | 1.2 (8) |
| Under 19s Division 1 | UNSW-Eastern Suburbs Bulldogs | 14.11 (95) | North Shore Bombers | 5.8 (38) |
| Under 19s Division 2 | Southern Power | 7.10 (52) | UNSW-Eastern Suburbs Bulldogs | 6.3 (39) |
| Women's Division 1 | Western Magic | 6.4 (40) | Wollongong Saints | 0.4 (4) |
| Women's Division 2 | Holroyd-Parramatta Goannas | 7.8 (50) | Camden Cats | 1.5 (11) |
| Masters | St George Dragons | 12.7 (79) | North West Sydney Redbacks | 4.6 (30) |

=== 2019–present ===
In 2019 the AFL Sydney competition consisted of two senior men's competitions with the Premier Division and Platinum Division each having seniors and reserves divisions and an extra Women's division created to accommodate the rapid grown of Women's football in Sydney. In this division, the St George Dragons finished in 5th place but 4 sudden-death finals win in a row saw them defeat minor premiers, Holroyd-Parramatta Goannas in the Grand Final. Similarly, the St George Dragons Premier Division Reserves team also came from 5th to defeat Minor Premiers, the Pennant Hills Australian Demons. In the Premier Division competition the UNSW-Eastern Suburbs Bulldogs went back-to-back by defeating Sydney University. Macquarie University defeated East Coast Eagles by 6 points to win the Women's Premier Division Grand Final. This season saw the Western Suburbs Magpies change their name to Inner West Magpies to further distinguish between themselves and the South West Sydney Magpies (formerly Moorebank).

The 2020 season was severely disrupted by the COVID-19 pandemic and due to the NSW government's restrictions only nine home and away rounds were able to be played before the finals. The finals were played in September–October rather than the traditional August–September. Sydney University won their first Premier Division flag since 1992 with a win over UNSW-Eastern Suburbs Bulldogs at Kanebridge Oval. Manly-Warringah, in their first season in the Women's Premier Division Premiership won the flag by defeating the Inner West Magpies. Southern Power made both the Platinum Division and Platinum Division Reserves Grand Finals at Rosedale Oval but lost to the Penrith Rams and Macquarie University (in a come-from-behind win) respectively. The Newtown Breakways inaugural men's team won the Men's Division 3 Grand Final by defeating North Shore. Grand Finals were played at Rosedale Ovals (for lower grades) and Kanebridge Oval due to the unavailability of Blacktown International Sportspark due to the COVID-19 pandemic. This was also the reason there was no Master's Grand Final in 2020.

2020 Grand Finals
| | Premier | Premier's Score G.B (T) | Runners-up | Runners-up Score G.B (T) |
|---|---|---|---|---|
| Premier Division | Sydney University Students | 8.6 (54) | UNSW-Eastern Suburbs Bulldogs | 6.9 (45) |
| Premier Division Reserves | UNSW-Eastern Suburbs Bulldogs | 5.11 (41) | North Shore Bombers | 4.4 (28) |
| Women's Premier Division | Manly-Warringah Wolves | 6.10 (46) | Inner West Magpies | 4.1 (25) |
| Platinum Division | Penrith Rams | 14.7 (91) | Southern Power | 5.7 (37) |
| Platinum Division Reserves | Macquarie University | 7.9 (51) | Southern Power | 7.7 (49) |
| Men's Division 1 | Sydney University Students | 11.11 (77) | North Shore Bombers | 11.1 (67) |
| Men's Division 2 | Sydney University Students | 11.6 (72) | North Shore Bombers | 4.4. (28) |
| Men's Division 3 | Newtown Breakaways | 7.12 (54) | North Shore Bombers | 0.3 (3) |
| Under 19s Division 1 | North Shore Bombers | 14.13 (97) | UNSW-Eastern Suburbs Bulldogs | 7.7 (49) |
| Under 19s Division 2 | Southern Power | 6.8 (44) | Sydney University Students | 3.1 (19) |
| Women's Division 1 | Parramatta Goannas | 4.10 (34) | Camden Cats | 0.1 (1) |
| Women's Division 2 | Western Magic | 12.7 (79) | St George Dragons | 3.2 (20) |
| Women's Division 3 | Campbelltown Blues | 9.4 (58) | Wollondilly Knights | 4.3 (27) |

The 2021 season saw the introduction of a 5th Division of Women's Football known as "Women's Division 4". 7 teams took part in this new division. There was also an additional 12 teams across all Men's and Women's divisions. On 24 June, the season was put on hold due to the outbreak COVID-19 Delta variant throughout Greater Sydney. The 2021 season was eventually cancelled on 16 August. Accordingly, no premierships, medals or awards were given for 2021 cancelled competitions. The 2022 season saw a slight reduction in overall teams from 135 to 126. This season also saw the merger of South West Sydney Magpies and Campbelltown Blues to form the South Western Sydney Blues. This proved to be a successful season for the merged entity as they went on to win the Platinum Division Premiership and finish Runners-Up in the Platinum Division Reserves Competition. This wasn't the first time that the clubs had aligned, with the two clubs previously entering a combined U19s side in the Division 2 competition. Other club changes were Nor-West Jets being renamed to Hawkesbury Jets and the North West Sydney Redbacks no longer entering a team in the Masters competition.

2022 Grand Finals
| | Premier | Premier's Score G.B (T) | Runners-up | Runners-up Score G.B (T) |
|---|---|---|---|---|
| Premier Division | UNSW-Eastern Suburbs Bulldogs | 7.10 (52) | North Shore Bombers | 2.10 (22) |
| Premier Division Reserves | St George Dragons | 9.7 (61) | Sydney University Students | 7.11 (53) |
| Women's Premier Division | East Coast Eagles | 6.5 (41) | Manly-Warringah Wolves | 2.11 (23) |
| Platinum Division | South West Sydney Blues | 6.9 (45) | Camden Cats | 3.4 (22) |
| Platinum Division Reserves | Southern Power | 11.6 (72) | South West Sydney Blues | 3.6 (24) |
| Men's Division 1 | North Shore Bombers | 8.10 (58) | Sydney University Students | 3.9 (27) |
| Men's Division 2 | UNSW-Eastern Suburbs Bulldogs | 7.9 (51) | East Coast Eagles | 4.3 (27) |
| Men's Division 3 | Manly-Warringah Wolves | 9.9 (63) | Wollondilly Knights | 2.6 (18) |
| Under 19s Division 1 | Sydney University Students | 9.6 (60) | UNSW-Eastern Suburbs Bulldogs | 7.8 (50) |
| Under 19s Division 2 | North Shore Bombers | 9.6 (60) | Manly-Warringah Wolves | 6.5 (41) |
| Women's Division 1 | Parramatta Goannas | 3.5 (23) | East Coast Eagles | 2.3 (15) |
| Women's Division 2 | Pennant Hills Demons | 3.3 (21) | Penrith Rams | 3.1 (19) |
| Women's Division 3 | North Shore Bombers | 4.11 (35) | Parramatta Goannas | 1.2 (8) |
| Women's Division 4 | South West Sydney Blues | 1.9 (15) | East Coast Eagles | 1.1 (7) |
| Masters | St George Dragons | 7.4 (46) | Southern Dingoes | 6.3 (39) |

=== 2023 ===
The 2023 season saw another reduction in overall teams from 126 to 120. This season also saw the women's programs of the Macquarie University Warriors and Parramatta Goannas clubs merge to form the Macquarie University Goannas. This merged entity entered a team in 4 of the 5 women's divisions. Other notable changes were the 3rd and 4th grades men's sides from Sydney University and North Shore entering teams in the Platinum Division and Platinum Division Reserves competitions respectively. Also in 2023, Randwick City no longer entered teams in the Platinum Division or Platinum Divisions Reserves competition. Another notable change in the women's competitions was Inner West no longer entering a Premier Division side.

2023 Grand Finals
| | Premier | Premier's Score G.B (T) | Runners-up | Runners-up Score G.B (T) |
|---|---|---|---|---|
| Premier Division | UNSW-Eastern Suburbs Bulldogs | 10.6 (66) | North Shore Bombers | 6.10 (46) |
| Premier Division Reserves | North Shore Bombers | 6.7 (43) | Sydney University Students | 5.10 (40) |
| Women's Premier Division | East Coast Eagles | 8.8 (56) | UTS Bats | 1.6 (12) |
| Platinum Division | South West Sydney Blues | 10.8 (68) | Camden Cats | 4.12 (36) |
| Platinum Division Reserves | North Shore Bombers | 7.5 (47) | Camden Cats | 4.5 (29) |
| Men's Division 1 | Randwick City Saints | 8.8 (56) | UTS Bats | 4.12 (36) |
| Men's Division 2 | North Shore Bombers | 7.4 (46) | Manly-Warringah Wolves | 5.9 (39) |
| Men's Division 3 | UTS Bats | 10.8 (68) | Camden Cats | 2.2 (14) |
| Under 19s Division 1 | Sydney University Students | 9.8 (62) | UNSW-Eastern Suburbs Bulldogs | 9.7 (61) |
| Under 19s Division 2 | Manly-Warringah Wolves | 6.6 (42) | Sydney University Students | 2.6 (18) |
| Women's Division 1 | St George Dragons | 2.2 (14) | UTS Bats | 1.2 (8) |
| Women's Division 2 | Randwick City Saints | 11.12 (78) | Newtown Breakaways | 7.4 (46) |
| Women's Division 3 | Camden Cats | 6.5 (41) | Macquarie University Goannas | 6.0 (36) |
| Women's Division 4 | Randwick City Saints | 5.7 (37) | Newtown Breakaways | 2.0 (12) |
| Masters | UTS Bats | 4.7 (31) | Pennant Hills Demons | 3.5 (23) |

==== Competition restructure in 2027 ====
Ahead of the 2027 season, the AFL announced that a new senior competition, the Sydney Football League, would be established to as New South Wales' premier football competition, and consist of four grades; senior men's, senior women's, under 19.5 men's and under 20 women's. Nine AFL Sydney clubs were accepted into the competition; South West Sydney Blues (South West), St. George Dragons (South), Sydney University (City and Inner West), UNSW Eastern Suburbs Bulldogs (East-Bayside), UTS Bats (East Parkside), North Shore Bombers (North Shore), Manly, Warringah Wolves (Northern Beaches), Pennant Hills Demons (North West) and East Coast Eagles (West). There will not be promotion or relegation from the SFL to AFL Sydney.

== Audience ==
Attendances for the Sydney AFL are very small in comparison to state level leagues elsewhere in Australia, however Grand Final crowds sometimes reach as high as 3,000 though historically they were much higher towards 15,000 .

In 2007, in a first for Australian rules football in Sydney, it was announced that Foxtel would be televising an edited match of the week and a magazine-style segment on the public Television Channel Aurora. The program contained footy news from around NSW/ACT as well as showing highlights from the "Match of the Week". In 2008 the magazine style was dropped in favour of a 1-hour dedicated highlights show of the Match of the Week. Digital Sports Productions continued this format in 2009 and the show is aired on the Main Event Channel each Friday night in NSW and QLD before the AFL Friday night game.

2021 also saw the introduction of a Men's and Women's Premier Division Women's "Match of the Round" being live-streamed on Kayo Sports which could be watched for free.

== Clubs ==
Location of participating clubs in Sydney
- Wollondilly Knights not pictured

| Club | Colours | Nickname | Home Ground | Former League | Est. | Years in NSWAFL | Known NSWAFL Senior Premierships | |
| Club | Colours | Nickname | Home Ground | Former League | Est. | Years in NSWAFL | Total | Most recent |
|---|---|---|---|---|---|---|---|---|
| Balmain | | Tigers | Rozelle Parklands, Rozelle | – | 1903 | 1903–1909, 1913, 1919–1925, 1948–1987, 1994– | 3 | 2014 |
| Camden | | Cats | Fairfax Reserve, Harrington Park | SCAFL | 1982 | 2008– | 2 | 2018 |
| East Coast (Baulkham Hills 1976–99, Sydney Hills 2012–14) | | Eagles | Bruce Purser Reserve, Rouse Hill | NEAFL | 1976 | 1988– | 4 | 2016 |
| Hawkesbury Jets (Norwest Jets 2001–21) | | Jets | Bensons Lane, Richmond Lowlands | – | 2001 | 2001– | 2 | 2006 |
| Inner West (Western Suburbs 1926–2016) | | Magpies | Picken Oval, Croydon Park | – | 1926 | 1926–1930, 1948– | 11 | 2017 |
| Manly-Warringah | | Wolves | Weldon Oval, Curl Curl | – | 1969 | 1971–1979, 2004– | 9 | 2025 |
| Macquarie University | | Warriors | Macquarie University Oval, Macquarie Park | – | 1969 | 1971, 1973–1979, 2004– | 3 | 2025 |
| Newtown | | Breakaways | HJ Mahoney Park, Marrickville | – | 2002 | 2002– | 1 | 2020 |
| North Shore | | Bombers | Gore Hill Oval, St Leonards | – | 1903 | 1903–1914, 1921–1941, 1946–2025 | 20 | 2024 |
| Parramatta (Holroyd-Parramatta 1983–2019) | | Goannas | Gipps Road Oval, Smithfield | – | 1979 | 1979– | 1 | 2001 |
| Pennant Hills | | Demons | Mike Kenny Oval, Cherrybrook | – | 1971 | 1971– | 13 | 2018 |
| Penrith | | Rams | Greygums Oval, Cranebrook | – | 1981 | 1981– | 4 | 2020 |
| Randwick City (Saints AFC 2010–11) | | Saints | Pioneers Park, Malabar | – | 2010 | 2010– | 4 | 2024 |
| South West Sydney | | Blues | Bob Prenter Oval, Macquarie Fields and Rosedale Oval, Warwick Farm | – | 2022 | 2022– | 2 | 2023 |
| Southern Dingoes | | Dingoes | Lincoln Oval (Waratah Park No 4), Sutherland | – | 2018– | 2018– | 0 | – |
| Southern Power (Sutherland 1972–93, Cronulla-Sutherland 1994–99, Southern Sharks 2000–08) | | Power | Lincoln Oval (Waratah Park No 4), Sutherland | – | 1972 | 1974–1979, 2004– | 5 | 2024 |
| St George | | Dragons | Olds Park, Penshurst | – | 1929 | 1929– | 9 | 2024 |
| Sydney University | | Students | University Oval, Camperdown | NSWFA | 1887 | 1948–1957, 1962–1968, 1971–1979, 1988–1994, 2004– | 13 | 2020 |
| UNSW-Eastern Suburbs | | Bulldogs | Henson Park, Marrickville | – | 1999 | 2000– | 13 | 2024 |
| UTS | | Bats | Waverley Oval, Bondi Junction | – | 2000 | 2000– | 11 | 2023 |
| Western Magic (Blacktown 2012–15) | | Magic | Blacktown International Sportspark, Rooty Hill | – | 2012 | 2012– | 3 | 2015 |
| Wollondilly | | Knights | Hannaford Oval, Wilton | SCAFL | 1989 | 1989–2007, 2014– | 1 | 2016 |

=== Former clubs ===
| Club | Colours | Nickname | Home Ground | Former league | Est. | Years in SAFL | SAFL Senior Premierships | | Fate |
| Club | Colours | Nickname | Home Ground | Former league | Est. | Years in SAFL | Total | Most recent | Fate |
|---|---|---|---|---|---|---|---|---|---|
| Alexandria | | | | – | 1903 | 1903 | 0 | – | Folded after 1903 season |
| Ashfield Electorate | | | | – | 1903 | 1903–1904 | 0 | – | Folded after 1904 season |
| Auburn | | Giants | Mona Park, Auburn | – | 2010 | 2010–2018 | 1 | 2010 | Folded after 2018 season |
| Balmain-Ermington | | | ELS Hall Park, North Ryde | – | 1975 | 1975–1977 | 0 | – | Folded after 1977 season |
| Bankstown (1) | | | Bankstown Oval, Bankstown | – | 1958 | 1958–1962 | 0 | – | Merged with Liverpool to form Liverpool-Bankstown following 1962 season |
| Bankstown (2) | | Bombers | Jensen Park, Regents Park | – | 1972 | 1972–1979 | 0 | – | Moved to Sydney FA following 1979 season |
| Campbelltown | | Blues | Bob Prenter Oval, Macquarie Fields | SFA, CAFL | 1975 | 1976–1979, 1982–1995, 1999–2021 | 7 | 1999 | Played Sydney FA in 1980–81 and AFL Canberra between 1996 and 1998. Merged with South West Sydney Magpies to form South West Sydney Blues after 2021 season |
| Combined Services | | | | – | 1972 | 1972–1975 | 2 | 1974 | Folded after 1975 season |
| Department of Transport | | | | – | 1976 | 1976 | 0 | – | Folded after 1976 season |
| East Sydney (1) | | | Trumper Park Oval, Paddington | NSWFA | 1880 | 1903–1925 | 3 | 1918 | Merged with Paddington to form Eastern Suburbs after 1925 season |
| East Sydney (2) (Eastern Suburbs 1926–1968) | | Bulldogs | Trumper Park Oval, Paddington | | 1926 | 1926–1999 | 18 | 1984 | Merged with University of NSW to form UNSW-Eastern Suburbs after 1999 season |
| Gosford | | Tigers | Adcock Park, West Gosford | BDAFL | 1971 | 2012–2015 | 0 | – | Returned to Black Diamond AFL in 2016 |
| Greater West | | | Dukes Oval, Emu Plains | | | ?-2003 | 0 | – | U/18s only. Left competition after 2003 season |
| Holsworthy-Southern Districts | | | | – | 1974 | 1974 | 0 | – | Folded after 1975 season |
| Illawarra (1) | | | Wollongong Showground, Wollongong | – | 1949 | 1949–1950 | 0 | – | Folded after 1950 season |
| Illawarra (2) (Wollongong 1989–2010) | | Lions | North Dalton Park, Fairy Meadow | SCAFL | 1966 | 1989–2014 | 1 | 2004 | Returned to AFL South Coast as Wollongong in 2015 |
| Liverpool | | | | – | 1951 | 1951–1962 | 0 | – | Merged with Bankstown to form Liverpool-Bankstown following 1962 season |
| Liverpool (Southern Districts 1964–80) | | Eagles | | – | 1964 | 1964–1982 | 0 | – | Moved to Sydney FA in 1983 |
| Liverpool-Bankstown | | | | – | 1963 | 1963 | 0 | – | Merged with Parramatta to form Southern Districts following 1963 season |
| Macarthur | | Giants | Monarch Oval, Macquarie Fields | – | | 2013–2014 | 0 | – | U/18 only. Left competition after 2014 season |
| Newtown | | Blood-Stained Angels | Erskineville Oval, Erskineville | – | 1903 | 1903–1987 | 19 | 1970 | Folded after 1987 season |
| Nirimba | | Pelicans | | – | 1976 | 1976 | 0 | – | Folded after 1976 season; re-formed in Sydney FA in 1993 |
| North Sydney | | | | – | 1903 | 1903–? | 0 | – | Folded |
| Paddington | | | Trumper Park Oval, Paddington | – | 1903 | 1903–1926 | 7 | 1924 | Merged with East Sydney to form Eastern Suburbs after 1926 season |
| Parramatta | | | | – | 1961 | 1962–1963 | 0 | – | Merged with Liverpool-Bankstown to form Southern Districts after 1963 season |
| Penshurst | | Panthers | Olds Park, Penshurst | SDFA | 1954 | 1973–1976 | 0 | – | Senior club disbanded following 1976 season; re-formed in Sydney FA in 1994 |
| Police | | | | – | 1922 | 1922–1923 | 0 | – | Folded after 1923 season |
| R.A.A.F Richmond | | | | – | 1943 | 1943–1945, 1947, 1975–1979 | 0 | – | Folded after 1979 season |
| Railway | | | | – | 1912 | 1912, 1920–1925 | 0 | – | Folded after 1925 season |
| Redbacks | | Redbacks | Bruce Purser Reserve, Rouse Hill | – | 2001 | 2000–2002 | 0 | – | Withdrew after 2002 season |
| Salesians | | | | SFA | 1970 | 1971 | 0 | – | Folded after 1971 season |
| St Clair | | Crows | | – | 2000 | 2001–2005 | 0 | – | Folded after 2005 season |
| St Ignatius Riverview | | | Saint Ignatius' College, Riverview | | 1984 | 2004–2013 | 0 | – | U/18s only. Left competition after 2013 season |
| St Ives | | Saints | St Ives Showground, St Ives | SDFA | 1968 | 1975–1979 | 1 | 1979 | Formed Sydney FA following 1979 season |
| Seaforth | | | | SDFA | 1972 | 1975 | 0 | – | Folded after 1975 season |
| South Sydney (Redfern 1903–10) | | Rabbitohs | Kensington Oval, Kensington | – | 1903 | 1903–1969, 1972–1976 | 3 | 1935 | Recess in 1970–71. Merged with Newtown following 1976 season |
| South West Sydney (Moorebank 2008–14) | | Magpies | Rosedale Oval, Warwick Farm | SFA | 1995 | 2004–2021 | 2 | 2011 | Merged with Campbelltown to form South West Sydney Blues after 2021 season |
| Sydney Naval (Sydney 1881–1955) | | Redlegs | Trumper Park Oval, Paddington | NSWFA | 1881 | 1903–1971 | 10 | 1962 | Folded after 1971 season |
| Sydney Training College | | | | – | 1909 | 1909–1912 | 0 | – | Folded two round into 1912 season |
| University of NSW | | Wallies | Village Green, Kensington | SDFA | 1962 | 1969, 1971–1979 | 3 | 1977 | Merged with East Sydney to form UNSW-Eastern Suburbs after 1999 season |
| Western Suburbs | | | Marrickville Oval, Marrickville | – | 1926 | 1926–1929 | 0 | – | Folded after 1929 season |
| West Sydney | | | | NSWFA | 1886 | 1903–1905 | 0 | – | Folded after 1905 season |
| Western Jets | | Jets | | | | 1998–2000 | 0 | – | U/18s only. Merged with Hawkesbury to form Norwest Jets in 2001 |
| Wollongong | | Saints | North Dalton Park, Fairy Meadow | – | 2010 | 2010–2020 | 0 | – | Moved to AFL South Coast as Figtree Saints in 2021 |
| YMCA | | | | – | 1903 | 1903–1912 | 3 | 1910 | Folded after 1912 season |

== 2026 Men's Divisions ==
| Club | Premier Division | Division 1 | Division 2 | Division 3 | Division 4 | Division 5 | Division 6 | U19s Division 1 | U19s Division 2 | Masters | Total Teams |
|---|---|---|---|---|---|---|---|---|---|---|---|
| Balmain Tigers | | | | Yes | | Yes | | | | Yes | 3 |
| Camden Cats | | Yes | | Yes | | | Yes | | Yes | | 4 |
| East Coast Eagles | Yes | | Yes | | | | Yes | Yes | | | 4 |
| Hawkesbury Jets | | | | Yes | | | Yes | | | | 2 |
| Inner West Magpies | Yes | | Yes | | | Yes | | Yes | | Yes | 5 |
| Macquarie University Warriors | | | Yes | | | | Yes | | | | 2 |
| Manly-Warringah Wolves | Yes | Yes | | Yes | Yes | | Yes | Yes | Yes | Yes | 8 |
| Newtown Breakaways | | | | Yes | | | Yes | | | | 2 |
| North Shore Bombers | Yes | Yes | Yes | Yes | Yes | Yes | Yes | Yes | Yes | | 9 |
| Parramatta Goannas | | Yes | | | Yes | | | | | | 2 |
| Pennant Hills Demons | Yes | Yes | | Yes | | Yes | | Yes | Yes | Yes | 7 |
| Penrith Rams | | | Yes | | | Yes | | | | | 2 |
| Randwick City Saints | | | Yes | | Yes | | | | | | 2 |
| South West Sydney Blues | Yes | Yes | | | | Yes | | Yes | | Yes | 5 |
| Southern Dingoes | | | | | | | | | | Yes Yes | 2 |
| Southern Power | | | Yes | | Yes | | | | | | 2 |
| St George Dragons | Yes | Yes | | Yes | | | | Yes | Yes | Yes | 6 |
| Sydney University Students | Yes | Yes | | Yes | | | Yes | Yes | Yes | Yes | 7 |
| UNSW-Eastern Suburbs Bulldogs | Yes | Yes | | Yes | | Yes | | Yes | | | 5 |
| UTS Bats | Yes | | Yes | | Yes | | Yes | Yes | | Yes | 6 |
| Western Magic | | | | | Yes | | | | | | 1 |
| Wollondilly Knights | | | | | | Yes | | | | Yes | 2 |
| Totals | 10 | 9 | 8 | 10 | 7 | 8 | 9 | 10 | 6 | 11 | 88 |

== 2026 Women's Divisions ==
| Club | Premier Division | Division 1 | Division 2 | Division 3 | Under 20s | Total Teams |
|---|---|---|---|---|---|---|
| Balmain Tigers | | | | Yes | | 1 |
| Camden Cats | | | Yes | | | 1 |
| East Coast Eagles | Yes | Yes | | | | 2 |
| Hawkesbury Jets | | | | Yes | | 1 |
| Macquarie University Warriors | | | Yes | Yes | | 2 |
| Manly-Warringah Wolves | Yes | Yes | Yes | Yes | Yes | 5 |
| Newtown Breakaways | | Yes | | Yes | | 2 |
| North Shore Bombers | Yes | Yes | Yes | Yes | Yes | 5 |
| Parramatta Goannas | Yes | | Yes | | | 2 |
| Pennant Hills Demons | Yes | | Yes | | Yes | 3 |
| Penrith Rams | | | Yes | | | 1 |
| Randwick City Saints | | Yes | Yes | | | 2 |
| South West Sydney Blues | | Yes | | Yes | | 2 |
| Southern Power | | Yes | | | | 1 |
| St George Dragons | Yes | | | Yes | | 2 |
| Sydney University Students | Yes | Yes | | Yes | Yes | 4 |
| UNSW-Eastern Suburbs Bulldogs | Yes | | Yes | | Yes | 3 |
| UTS Bats | Yes | Yes | | Yes | Yes | 4 |
| Western Magic | | | | Yes | | 1 |
| Wollondilly Knights | | | | Yes | | 1 |
| Totals | 9 | 9 | 9 | 12 | 6 | 45 |

== First Grade (Men's) Premiers ==
List of First Grade Men's (currently Premier Division) premiers.

=== List of premiers ===
| Season | Premiers | Runners-up | Score |
|---|---|---|---|
| 1903 | East Sydney (1) | North Shore | 6.4 (44) d. 4.2 (26) |
| 1904 | North Shore (1) | Balmain | 5.13 (43) d. 2.8 (20) |
| 1905 | Sydney (1) | YMCA | 7.9 (51) d. 7.8 (50) |
| 1906 | Newtown (1) | Redfern | 9.8 (62) d. 1.14 (20) |
| 1907 | Sydney (2) | Newtown | 9.6 (60) d. 1.4 (10) |
| 1908 | YMCA (1) | East Sydney | 15.6 (96) d. 5.8 (38) |
| 1909 | North Shore (2) | YMCA | 7.5 (47) d. 5.5 (35) |
| 1910 | YMCA (2) | East Sydney | 5.18 (48) d. 3.6 (24) |
| 1911 | East Sydney (2) | Sydney | 4.5 (29) d. 2.4 (16) |
| 1912 | Sydney (3) | Paddington | 5.13 (43) d. 2.3 (15) |
| 1913 | Sydney (4) | Paddington | 9.16 (70) d. 6.6 (42) |
| 1914 | South Sydney (1) | Sydney | 7.7 (49) d. 4.15 (39) |
| 1915 | Paddington (1) | Newtown | 9.5 (59) d. 5.11 (41) |
| 1916 | Paddington (2) | Balmain | 3.14 (32) d. 1.8 (14) |
| 1917 | Paddington (3) | East Sydney | 12.20 (92) d. 3.10 (28) |
| 1918 | East Sydney (3) | Newtown | 14.12 (96) d. 6.7 (43) |
| 1919 | Paddington (4) | East Sydney | 11.10 (76) d. 8.8 (56) |
| 1920 | Paddington (5) | Newtown | 15.5 (95) d. 9.15 (69) |
| 1921 | North Shore (3) | Newtown | 10.7 (67) d. 7.12 (54) |
| 1922 | Paddington (6) | Newtown | 8.6 (54) d. 5.14 (44) |
| 1923 | Sydney (5) | Newtown | 10.7 (67) d. 8.15 (63) |
| 1924 | Paddington (7) | Newtown | 11.8 (74) d. 9.14 (68) |
| 1925 | Sydney (6) | Paddington | 9.13 (67) d. 7.10 (52) |
| 1926 | Eastern Suburbs (4) | Western Suburbs | 6.10 (46) d. 4.7 (31) |
| 1927 | Eastern Suburbs (5) | Newtown | 9.16 (70) d. 6.13 (49) |
| 1928 | Newtown (2) | Eastern Suburbs | 10.16 (76) d. 4.5 (29) |
| 1929 | Newtown (3) | North Shore | 10.8 (68) d. 6.6 (42) |
| 1930 | Newtown (4) | South Sydney | 9.17 (71) d. 7.13 (55) |
| 1931 | Sydney (7) | Newtown | 6.7 (43) d. 4.14 (38) |
| 1932 | Newtown (5) | South Sydney | 7.12 (54) d. 5.5 (35) |
| 1933 | Newtown (6) | Sydney | 10.3 (63) d. 7.16 (58) |
| 1934 | South Sydney (2) | Newtown | 17.12 (114) d. 12.6 (78) |
| 1935 | South Sydney (3) | St George | 21.9 (135) d. 11.17 (83) |
| 1936 | Newtown (7) | South Sydney | 17.8 (110) d. 10.10 (70) |
| 1937 | St George (1) | South Sydney | 11.16 (82) d. 6.9 (45) |
| 1938 | St George (2) | Newtown | 6.20 (56) d. 1.9 (15) |
| 1939 | Newtown (8) | St George | 10.25 (85) d. 10.3 (63) |
| 1940 | Newtown (9) | Eastern Suburbs | 10.11 (71) d. 8.8 (56) |
| 1941 | Eastern Suburbs (6) | South Sydney | 7.10 (52) d. 8.3 (51) |
| 1942 | Newtown (10) | South Sydney | 14.14 (98) d. 9.10 (64) |
| 1943 | St George (3) | South Sydney | 12.19 (91) d. 9.10 (64) |
| 1944 | Sydney Naval (8) | R.A.A.F | 11.15 (81) d. 8.17 (63) |
| 1945 | Newtown (11) | R.A.A.F | 20.18 (138) d. 12.14 (86) |
| 1946 | Newtown (12) | St George | 16.13 (109) d. 10.6 (66) |
| 1947 | Newtown (13) | Eastern Suburbs | 18.14 (122) d. 10.6 (66) |
| 1948 | Newtown (14) | Sydney Naval | 16.17 (113) d. 6.15 (51) |
| 1949 | Newtown (15) | Eastern Suburbs | 15.10 (100) d. 14.15 (99) |
| 1950 | Newtown (16) | Sydney Naval | 13.16 (94) d. 8.7 (55) |
| 1951 | Western Suburbs (1) | Eastern Suburbs | 11.15 (81) d. 10.9 (69) |
| 1952 | North Shore (4) | Western Suburbs | 11.7 (73) d. 9.12 (66) |
| 1953 | Eastern Suburbs (7) | Western Suburbs | 21.22 (148) d. 15.12 (102) |
| 1954 | Eastern Suburbs (8) | Newtown | 13.20 (98) d. 11.8 (74) |
| 1955 | Eastern Suburbs (9) | North Shore | 13.12 (90) d. 7.10 (52) |
| 1956 | Eastern Suburbs (10) | Western Suburbs | 10.12 (84) d. 9.17 (71) |
| 1957 | Eastern Suburbs (11) | Sydney Naval | 12.18 (90) d. 9.16 (70) |
| 1958 | Eastern Suburbs (12) | Western Suburbs | 15.11 (101) d. 8.11 (59) |
| 1959 | Eastern Suburbs (13) | Newtown | 14.11 (95) d. 7.11 (53) |
| 1960 | Sydney Naval (9) | Newtown | 9.12 (66) d. 9.9 (63) |
| 1961 | North Shore (5) | Sydney Naval | 11.15 (81) d. 4.11 (35) |
| 1962 | Sydney Naval (10) | Newtown | 18.20 (128) d. 14.13 (97) |
| 1963 | Western Suburbs (2) | Newtown | 14.14 (98) d. 12.16 (88) |
| 1964 | St George (4) | Western Suburbs | 14.18 (102) d. 4.18 (42) |
| 1965 | Western Suburbs (3) | St George | 17.15 (117) d. 12.9 (81) |
| 1966 | Western Suburbs (4) | St George | 15.22 (112) d. 10.10 (70) |
| 1967 | Newtown (17) | Western Suburbs | 9.16 (70) d. 8.12 (60) |
| 1968 | Newtown (18) | Western Suburbs | 22.11 (143) d. 10.18 (78) |
| 1969 | Western Suburbs (5) | Newtown | 13.17 (93) d. 12.16 (88) |
| 1970 | Newtown (19) | North Shore | 15.16 (106) d. 10.16 (76) |
| 1971 | East Sydney (14) | Western Suburbs | 19.15 (129) d. 15.22 (112) |
| 1972 | Western Suburbs (6) | East Sydney | 22.23 (149) d. 12.14 (86) |
| 1973 | East Sydney (15) | Western Suburbs | 22.18 (144) d. 18.9 (117) |
| 1974 | Western Suburbs (7) | East Sydney | 18.25 (133) d. 17.21 (123) |
| 1975 | Western Suburbs (8) | East Sydney | 18.18 (126) d. 12.16 (88) |
| 1976 | East Sydney (16) | North Shore | 23.12 (150) d. 10.13 (73) |
| 1977 | Western Suburbs (9) | North Shore | 18.25 (133) d. 14.9 (91) |
| 1978 | North Shore (6) | Western Suburbs | 17.17 (119) d. 13.12 (90) |
| 1979 | North Shore (7) | Western Suburbs | 13.17 (93) d. 9.22 (76) |
| 1980 | East Sydney (17) | North Shore | 30.24 (204) d. 12.11 (83) |
| 1981 | East Sydney (18) | Newtown | 19.16 (130) d. 3.23 (41) |
| 1982 | East Sydney (19) | Pennant Hills | 8.8 (56) d. 5.8 (38) |
| 1983 | East Sydney (20) | Balmain | 18.23 (131) d. 15.3 (93) |
| 1984 | East Sydney (21) | North Shore | 20.13 (133) d. 5.4 (34) |
| 1985 | North Shore (8) | Campbelltown | 18.19 (127) d. 14.12 (96) |
| 1986 | Campbelltown (1) | North Shore | 17.13 (115) d. 13.14 (92) |
| 1987 | Campbelltown (2) | St George | 25.16 (166) d. 12.7 (79) |
| 1988 | Campbelltown (3) | East Sydney | 13.10 (88) d. 8.9 (57) |
| 1989 | Campbelltown (4) | North Shore | 10.12 (72) d. 6.9 (45) |
| 1990 | Holroyd-Parramatta (1) | North Shore | 9.15 (69) d. 9.8 (62) |
| 1991 | North Shore (9) | Holroyd-Parramatta | 10.13 (73) d. 7.9 (51) |
| 1992 | Sydney University (1) | North Shore | 18.16 (124) d. 8.11 (59) |
| 1993 | St George (5) | North Shore | 17.13 (115) d. 9.26 (80) |
| 1994 | Campbelltown (5) | North Shore | 13.16 (94) d. 12.15 (87) |
| 1995 | Campbelltown (6) | Pennant Hills | 16.19 (115) d. 9.5 (59) |
| 1996 | Western Suburbs (10) | Pennant Hills | 12.16 (88) d. 11.10 (76) |
| 1997 | Balmain (1) | St George | 17.13 (115) d. 11.14 (80) |
| 1998 | Balmain (2) | Pennant Hills | 12.13 (85) d. 9.11 (65) |
| 1999 | Campbelltown (7) | Balmain | 18.5 (113) d. 13.13 (91) |
| 2000 | Pennant Hills (1) | North Shore | 15.12 (102) d. 10.7 (67) |
| 2001 | North Shore (10) | Campbelltown | 12.12 (84) d. 10.9 (69) |
| 2002 | UNSW/ES (22) | North Shore | 16.10 (106) d. 11.6 (72) |
| 2003 | UNSW/ES (23) | North Shore | 12.10 (82) d. 10.16 (76) |
| 2004 | North Shore (11) | St George | 10.11 (71) d. 7.4 (46) |
| 2005 | North Shore (12) | Western Suburbs | 13.9 (87) d. 6.10 (46) |
| 2006 | Pennant Hills (2) | East Coast | 5.20 (50) d. 7.6 (48) |
| 2007 | North Shore (13) | St George | 12.15 (87) d. 9.12 (66) |
| 2008 | Pennant Hills (3) | East Coast | 20.12 (132) d. 3.10 (28) |
| 2009 | East Coast (1) | UNSW/ES | 22.12 (144) d. 13.12 (90) |
| 2010 | East Coast (2) | Sydney University | 13.9 (87) d. 10.10 (70) |
| 2011 | East Coast (3) | Balmain | 17.12 (114) d. 10.11 (71) |
| 2012 | UNSW/ES (24) | Balmain | 13.11 (89) d. 7.5 (47) |
| 2013 | Manly-Warringah (1) | Pennant Hills | 11.14 (80) d. 11.6 (72) |
| 2014 | Manly-Warringah (2) | Pennant Hills | 8.20 (68) d. 2.10 (22) |
| 2015 | Pennant Hills (4) | East Coast | 14.5 (89) d. 7.12 (54) |
| 2016 | East Coast (4) | St George | 17.5 (107) d. 9.12 (66) |
| 2017 | Pennant Hills (5) | Sydney University | 10.6 (66) d. 7.18 (60) |
| 2018 | UNSW/ES (25) | Sydney University | 8.10 (58) d. 7.13 (55) |
| 2019 | UNSW/ES (26) | Sydney University | 10.9 (69) d. 6.15 (51) |
| 2020 | Sydney University (2) | UNSW/ES | 8.6 (54) d. 6.9 (45) |
| 2022 | UNSW/ES (27) | North Shore | 7.10 (52) d. 2.10 (22) |
| 2023 | UNSW/ES (28) | North Shore | 10.6 (66) d. 6.10 (46) |
| 2024 | North Shore (14) | Manly-Warringah | 10.9 (69) d. 5.6 (36) |
| 2025 | North Shore (15) | Manly-Warringah | 14.5 (89) d. 7.8 (50) |

=== Number of Premierships by Club ===
| Premiership(s) | Club | Years | | | | | | | | | |
|---|---|---|---|---|---|---|---|---|---|---|---|
| 28 | East Sydney/Eastern Suburbs/ UNSW-ES | 1903 | 1911 | 1918 | 1926 | 1927 | 1941 | 1953 | 1954 | 1955 | 1956 |
| 28 | East Sydney/Eastern Suburbs/ UNSW-ES | 1957 | 1958 | 1959 | 1971 | 1973 | 1976 | 1980 | 1981 | 1982 | 1983 |
| 28 | East Sydney/Eastern Suburbs/ UNSW-ES | 1984 | 2002 | 2003 | 2012 | 2018 | 2019 | 2022 | 2023 | | |
| 19 | Newtown | 1906 | 1928 | 1929 | 1930 | 1932 | 1933 | 1936 | 1939 | 1940 | 1942 |
| 19 | Newtown | 1945 | 1946 | 1947 | 1948 | 1949 | 1950 | 1967 | 1968 | 1970 | |
| 15 | North Shore | 1904 | 1909 | 1921 | 1952 | 1961 | 1978 | 1979 | 1985 | 1991 | 2001 |
| 15 | North Shore | 2004 | 2005 | 2007 | 2024 | 2025 | | | | | |
| 10 | Sydney Naval | 1905 | 1907 | 1912 | 1913 | 1923 | 1925 | 1931 | 1944 | 1960 | 1962 |
| 10 | Western Suburbs/Inner West | 1951 | 1963 | 1965 | 1966 | 1969 | 1972 | 1974 | 1975 | 1977 | 1996 |
| 7 | Paddington | 1915 | 1916 | 1917 | 1919 | 1920 | 1922 | 1924 | | | |
| 7 | Campbelltown | 1986 | 1987 | 1988 | 1989 | 1994 | 1995 | 1999 | | | |
| 5 | St George | 1937 | 1938 | 1943 | 1964 | 1993 | | | | | |
| 5 | Pennant Hills | 2000 | 2006 | 2008 | 2015 | 2017 | | | | | |
| 4 | East Coast | 2009 | 2010 | 2011 | 2016 | | | | | | |
| 3 | South Sydney | 1914 | 1934 | 1935 | | | | | | | |
| 2 | YMCA | 1908 | 1910 | | | | | | | | |
| 2 | Sydney University | 1992 | 2020 | | | | | | | | |
| 2 | Balmain | 1997 | 1998 | | | | | | | | |
| 2 | Manly-Warringah | 2013 | 2014 | | | | | | | | |
| 1 | Holroyd-Parramatta/Parramatta | 1990 | | | | | | | | | |

== First Grade (Women's) Premiers ==
List of First Grade Women's (currently Women's Premier Division) premiers.

| Year | Premiers |
| 1999 | Sydney Women's AFL Formed |
|---|---|
| 2000 | Western Wolves |
| 2001 | Sydney University Bombers |
| 2002 | Newtown Breakaways |
| 2003 | Newtown Breakaways |
| 2004 | Newtown Breakaways |
| 2005 | Newtown Breakaways |
| 2006 | Western Wolves |
| 2007 | Sydney University Gold |
| 2008 | Western Wolves |
| 2009 | Newtown Breakaways |
| 2010 | Newtown Breakaways |
| 2011 | Balmain Dockers |
| 2012 | Balmain Dockers |

| Year | Premiers |
Merged with AFL Sydney
| 2013 | Sydney University |
| 2014 | Sydney University Bombers |
| 2015 | Newtown Breakaways |
| 2016 | UNSW-Eastern Suburbs |
| 2017 | UNSW-Eastern Suburbs |
| 2018 | UNSW-Eastern Suburbs |
| 2019 | Macquarie University |
| 2020 | Manly-Warringah |
| 2021 | Season Cancelled due to the COVID-19 pandemic |
| 2022 | East Coast Eagles |
| 2023 | East Coast Eagles |
| 2024 | East Coast Eagles |
| 2025 | North Shore Bombers |

=== Number of Premierships by Club ===
| Number of Premierships | Club | Years | | | | | | |
|---|---|---|---|---|---|---|---|---|
| 6 | Newtown Breakaways | 2002 | 2003 | 2004 | 2005 | 2009 | 2010 | 2015 |
| 4 | Sydney Uni. Bombers/Gold/ Sydney Uni. | 2001 | 2007 | 2013 | 2014 | | | |
| 3 | Western Wolves/Inner West Magpies | 2000 | 2006 | 2008 | | | | |
| 3 | UNSW-Eastern Suburbs | 2016 | 2017 | 2018 | | | | |
| 2 | Balmain Dockers/Balmain Tigers | 2011 | 2012 | | | | | |
| 3 | East Coast | 2022 | 2023 | 2024 | | | | |
| 1 | Macquarie University | 2019 | | | | | | |
| 1 | Manly-Warringah | 2020 | | | | | | |
| 1 | North Shore Bombers | 2025 | | | | | | |

== Senior Premierships by Year ==
=== Men ===
| Year | Premier | Division 1 | Division 2 | Division 3 | Division 4 | Division 5 | |
| Year | Premier | Division 1 | Division 2 | Division 3 | Division 4 | North-West | City/South West |
|---|---|---|---|---|---|---|---|
| 2025 | North Shore | North Shore | Manly Warringah | Macquarie University | North Shore | Manly Warringah | UTS |
| 2024 | North Shore | North Shore | Southern Power | UNSW/ES | St George | Randwick City | |
| | Premier | Premier Reserves | Platinum | Division 1 | Division 2 | Division 3 | 6 divisions (2018–23) |
| 2023 | UNSW/ES | North Shore | South West Sydney Blues | Randwick City | North Shore | UTS | 6 divisions (2018–23) |
| 2022 | UNSW/ES | St George | South West Sydney Blues | North Shore | UNSW/ES | Manly-Warringah | 6 divisions (2018–23) |
| 2021 | No finals played due to COVID-19 pandemic | | | | | | 6 divisions (2018–23) |
| 2020 | Sydney University | UNSW/ES | Penrith | Sydney University | Sydney University | Newtown Breakaways | 6 divisions (2018–23) |
| 2019 | UNSW/ES | St George | Southern Power | Sydney University | UNSW/ES | North Shore | 6 divisions (2018–23) |
| 2018 | UNSW/ES | Pennant Hills | Penrith | Pennant Hills | UNSW/ES | Camden | 6 divisions (2018–23) |
| | Premier | Division 1 | Division 2 | Division 3 | Division 4 | Division 5 | |
| 2017 | Pennant Hills | St George | North Shore | North Shore | St George | Inner West | |
| 2016 | East Coast Eagles | UTS | Camden | Wollondilly | UTS | Pennant Hills | |
| 2015 | Pennant Hills | Sydney University | Blacktown | UTS | Macquarie University | UTS | |
| 2014 | Manly-Warringah | Balmain | Sydney University | Randwick City | UTS | Blacktown | |
| 2013 | Manly-Warringah | Southern Power | Sydney University | Blacktown | Pennant Hills | Randwick City | |
| 2012 | UNSW/ES | Manly-Warringah | St George | UTS | Penrith | Sydney University | |
| 2011 | East Coast Eagles | Manly-Warringah | Penrith | UNSW/ES | Moorebank | Southern Power | |
| 2010 | East Coast Eagles | UTS | Southern Power | Moorebank | Auburn | 5 divisions (2009–10) | |
| 2009 | East Coast Eagles | UTS | Macquarie University | UNSW/ES | Sydney University | 5 divisions (2009–10) | |
| 2008 | Pennant Hills | UTS | Pennant Hills | 3 divisions (2003–08) | | | |
| 2007 | North Shore | Manly-Warringah | Pennant Hills | 3 divisions (2003–08) | | | |
| 2006 | Pennant Hills | UTS | Norwest Jets | 3 divisions (2003–08) | | | |
| 2005 | North Shore | Sydney University | Norwest Jets | 3 divisions (2003–08) | | | |
| | Premier | SFA First Grade | SFA Division 2 | 3 divisions (2003–08) | | | |
| 2004 | North Shore | Wollongong | Sydney University | 3 divisions (2003–08) | | | |
| | First Grade | SFA First Grade | SFA Division 2 | 3 divisions (2003–08) | | | |
| 2003 | UNSW/ES | Sydney University | Pennant Hills | 3 divisions (2003–08) | | | |
| 2002 | UNSW/ES | 1 division (1980–2002) | | | | | |
| 2001 | North Shore | 1 division (1980–2002) | | | | | |
| 2000 | Pennant Hills | 1 division (1980–2002) | | | | | |
| 1999 | Campbelltown | 1 division (1980–2002) | | | | | |
| 1998 | Balmain | 1 division (1980–2002) | | | | | |
| 1997 | Balmain | 1 division (1980–2002) | | | | | |
| 1996 | Western Suburbs | 1 division (1980–2002) | | | | | |
| 1995 | Campbelltown | 1 division (1980–2002) | | | | | |
| 1994 | Campbelltown | 1 division (1980–2002) | | | | | |
| 1993 | St George | 1 division (1980–2002) | | | | | |
| 1992 | Sydney University | 1 division (1980–2002) | | | | | |
| 1991 | North Shore | 1 division (1980–2002) | | | | | |
| 1990 | Holroyd-Parramatta | 1 division (1980–2002) | | | | | |
| 1989 | Campbelltown | 1 division (1980–2002) | | | | | |
| 1988 | Campbelltown | 1 division (1980–2002) | | | | | |
| 1987 | Campbelltown | 1 division (1980–2002) | | | | | |
| 1986 | Campbelltown | 1 division (1980–2002) | | | | | |
| 1985 | North Shore | 1 division (1980–2002) | | | | | |
| 1984 | East Sydney | 1 division (1980–2002) | | | | | |
| 1983 | East Sydney | 1 division (1980–2002) | | | | | |
| 1982 | East Sydney | 1 division (1980–2002) | | | | | |
| 1981 | East Sydney | 1 division (1980–2002) | | | | | |
| 1980 | East Sydney | 1 division (1980–2002) | | | | | |
| 1979 | North Shore | St Ives | 2 divisions (1971–79) | | | | |
| 1978 | North Shore | Campbelltown | 2 divisions (1971–79) | | | | |
| 1977 | Western Suburbs | UNSW | 2 divisions (1971–79) | | | | |
| 1976 | East Sydney | Pennant Hills | 2 divisions (1971–79) | | | | |
| 1975 | Western Suburbs | Pennant Hills | 2 divisions (1971–79) | | | | |
| 1974 | Western Suburbs | Combined Services | 2 divisions (1971–79) | | | | |
| 1973 | East Sydney | Combined Services | 2 divisions (1971–79) | | | | |
| 1972 | Western Suburbs | UNSW | 2 divisions (1971–79) | | | | |
| 1971 | East Sydney | UNSW | 2 divisions (1971–79) | | | | |
| 1970 | Newtown | 1 division (1903–70) | | | | | |
| 1969 | Western Suburbs | 1 division (1903–70) | | | | | |
| 1968 | Newtown | 1 division (1903–70) | | | | | |
| 1967 | Newtown | 1 division (1903–70) | | | | | |
| 1966 | Western Suburbs | 1 division (1903–70) | | | | | |
| 1965 | Western Suburbs | 1 division (1903–70) | | | | | |
| 1964 | St George | 1 division (1903–70) | | | | | |
| 1963 | Western Suburbs | 1 division (1903–70) | | | | | |
| 1962 | Sydney Naval | 1 division (1903–70) | | | | | |
| 1961 | North Shore | 1 division (1903–70) | | | | | |
| 1960 | Sydney Naval | 1 division (1903–70) | | | | | |
| 1959 | Eastern Suburbs | 1 division (1903–70) | | | | | |
| 1958 | Eastern Suburbs | 1 division (1903–70) | | | | | |
| 1957 | Eastern Suburbs | 1 division (1903–70) | | | | | |
| 1956 | Eastern Suburbs | 1 division (1903–70) | | | | | |
| 1955 | Eastern Suburbs | 1 division (1903–70) | | | | | |
| 1954 | Eastern Suburbs | 1 division (1903–70) | | | | | |
| 1953 | Eastern Suburbs | 1 division (1903–70) | | | | | |
| 1952 | North Shore | 1 division (1903–70) | | | | | |
| 1951 | Western Suburbs | 1 division (1903–70) | | | | | |
| 1950 | Newtown | 1 division (1903–70) | | | | | |
| 1949 | Newtown | 1 division (1903–70) | | | | | |
| 1948 | Newtown | 1 division (1903–70) | | | | | |
| 1947 | Newtown | 1 division (1903–70) | | | | | |
| 1946 | Newtown | 1 division (1903–70) | | | | | |
| 1945 | Newtown | 1 division (1903–70) | | | | | |
| 1944 | Sydney Naval | 1 division (1903–70) | | | | | |
| 1943 | St George | 1 division (1903–70) | | | | | |
| 1942 | Newtown | 1 division (1903–70) | | | | | |
| 1941 | Eastern Suburbs | 1 division (1903–70) | | | | | |
| 1940 | Newtown | 1 division (1903–70) | | | | | |
| 1939 | Newtown | 1 division (1903–70) | | | | | |
| 1938 | St George | 1 division (1903–70) | | | | | |
| 1937 | St George | 1 division (1903–70) | | | | | |
| 1936 | Newtown | 1 division (1903–70) | | | | | |
| 1935 | South Sydney | 1 division (1903–70) | | | | | |
| 1934 | South Sydney | 1 division (1903–70) | | | | | |
| 1933 | Newtown | 1 division (1903–70) | | | | | |
| 1932 | Newtown | 1 division (1903–70) | | | | | |
| 1931 | Sydney | 1 division (1903–70) | | | | | |
| 1930 | Newtown | 1 division (1903–70) | | | | | |
| 1929 | Newtown | 1 division (1903–70) | | | | | |
| 1928 | Newtown | 1 division (1903–70) | | | | | |
| 1927 | Eastern Suburbs | 1 division (1903–70) | | | | | |
| 1926 | Eastern Suburbs | 1 division (1903–70) | | | | | |
| 1925 | Sydney | 1 division (1903–70) | | | | | |
| 1924 | Paddington | 1 division (1903–70) | | | | | |
| 1923 | Sydney | 1 division (1903–70) | | | | | |
| 1922 | Paddington | 1 division (1903–70) | | | | | |
| 1921 | North Shore | 1 division (1903–70) | | | | | |
| 1920 | Paddington | 1 division (1903–70) | | | | | |
| 1919 | Paddington | 1 division (1903–70) | | | | | |
| 1918 | East Sydney | 1 division (1903–70) | | | | | |
| 1917 | Paddington | 1 division (1903–70) | | | | | |
| 1916 | Paddington | 1 division (1903–70) | | | | | |
| 1915 | Paddington | 1 division (1903–70) | | | | | |
| 1914 | South Sydney | 1 division (1903–70) | | | | | |
| 1913 | Sydney | 1 division (1903–70) | | | | | |
| 1912 | Sydney | 1 division (1903–70) | | | | | |
| 1911 | East Sydney | 1 division (1903–70) | | | | | |
| 1910 | YMCA | 1 division (1903–70) | | | | | |
| 1909 | North Shore | 1 division (1903–70) | | | | | |
| 1908 | YMCA | 1 division (1903–70) | | | | | |
| 1907 | Sydney | 1 division (1903–70) | | | | | |
| 1906 | Newtown | 1 division (1903–70) | | | | | |
| 1905 | YMCA | 1 division (1903–70) | | | | | |
| 1904 | North Shore | 1 division (1903–70) | | | | | |
| 1903 | East Sydney | 1 division (1903–70) | | | | | |

=== Women ===
| Year | Premier | Division 1 | Division 2 | Division 3 | Division 4 |
|---|---|---|---|---|---|
| 2025 | North Shore | Randwick City | East Coast Eagles | Parramatta | 4 divisions (2024–) |
| 2024 | East Coast Eagles | UTS | Camden | South West Sydney Blues | 4 divisions (2024–) |
| 2023 | East Coast Eagles | St George | Randwick City | Camden | Randwick City |
| 2022 | East Coast Eagles | Parramatta | Pennant Hills | North Shore | South West Sydney Blues |
| 2021 | No finals played due to COVID-19 pandemic | | | | |
| 2020 | Manly-Warringah | Parramatta | Western Magic | Campbelltown | 4 divisions (2019–20) |
| 2019 | Macquarie University | Wollongong | East Coast Eagles | St George | 4 divisions (2019–20) |
| 2018 | UNSW/ES | Western Magic | Holroyd-Parramatta | 3 divisions (2018) | |
| 2017 | UNSW/ES | Wollongong | 2 divisions (2014–17) | | |
| 2016 | UNSW/ES | UTS | 2 divisions (2014–17) | | |
| 2015 | Newtown Breakaways | Gosford | 2 divisions (2014–17) | | |
| 2014 | Sydney University | Southern Power | 2 divisions (2014–17) | | |
| 2013 | Sydney University | 1 division (2000–13 | | | |
| 2012 | Balmain | 1 division (2000–13 | | | |
| 2011 | Balmain | 1 division (2000–13 | | | |
| 2010 | Newtown Breakaways | 1 division (2000–13 | | | |
| 2009 | Newtown Breakaways | 1 division (2000–13 | | | |
| 2008 | Western Wolves | 1 division (2000–13 | | | |
| 2007 | Sydney University Gold | 1 division (2000–13 | | | |
| 2006 | Western Wolves | 1 division (2000–13 | | | |
| 2005 | Newtown Breakaways | 1 division (2000–13 | | | |
| 2004 | Newtown Breakaways | 1 division (2000–13 | | | |
| 2003 | Newtown Breakaways | 1 division (2000–13 | | | |
| 2002 | Newtown Breakaways | 1 division (2000–13 | | | |
| 2001 | Sydney University | 1 division (2000–13 | | | |
| 2000 | Western Wolves | 1 division (2000–13 | | | |

== Best and fairest awards ==
The Phelan Medal is an annual award given in the Sydney AFL. It is awarded to best and fairest player of the premier division competition each year. It is seen to be the AFL Sydney equivalent to the Brownlow Medal. The Mostyn Medal is awarded to the best and fairest player in the premier division of the women's league.
