= Philippa Smyth =

Australian rules footballer (born 1995)

Personal information
- Born: 9 September 1995 (age 31)
- Original team: Nelson Bay (BDAFL)
- Draft: No. 43, 2017 AFL Women's draft
- Debut: Round 4, 2018, Greater Western Sydney vs. Adelaide, at Blacktown ISP Oval
- Height: 180 cm (5 ft 11 in)
- Position: Ruck / forward

Playing career^{1}
Years	Club	Games (Goals)
2018	Greater Western Sydney	1 (0)
- ^{1} Playing statistics correct to the end of the 2018 season.

Philippa Smyth (born 9 September 1995) is an Australian rules footballer who played for the Greater Western Sydney Giants in the AFL Women's competition (AFLW). Smythe was drafted by the Giants with their fifth selection and the 73rd pick overall in the 2017 AFL Women's draft. She made her debut in a draw with Adelaide at Blacktown ISP Oval in round 4 of the 2018 season. She was delisted by Greater Western Sydney at the end of the 2018 season.
