= Amanda Farrugia =

Australian rules footballer

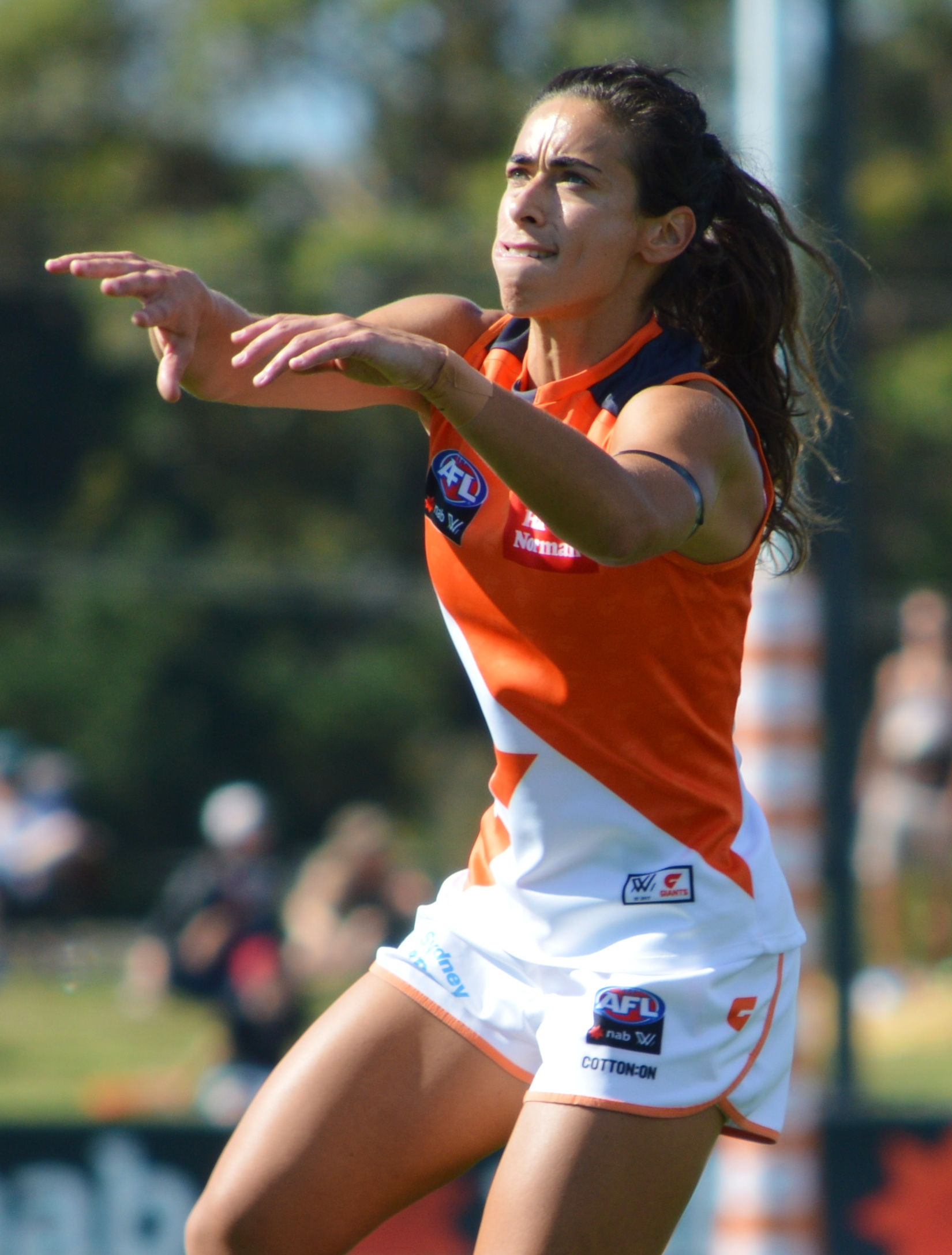
- Farrugia playing for Greater Western Sydney in February 2018

Personal information
- Born: 24 January 1985 (age 41); Sydney, New South Wales
- Original team: Macquarie University Australian Football Club (SWAFL)
- Draft: No. 64, 2016 AFL Women's draft
- Debut: Round 1, 2017, Greater Western Sydney vs. Adelaide, at Thebarton Oval
- Height: 163 cm (5 ft 4 in)
- Position: Utility

Playing career^{1}
Years	Club	Games (Goals)
2017–2019	Greater Western Sydney	21 (2)
- ^{1} Playing statistics correct to the end of the 2019 season.

Career highlights
- AFLW: Greater Western Sydney captain: 2017–2019; State: AFL Sydney Women's Premier Division best and fairest: 2015, 2017; AFL Sydney Women's Division Two best and fairest: 2013

Amanda Farrugia (born 24 January 1985) is a former Australian rules footballer who played for the Greater Western Sydney Giants in the AFL Women's competition. She was the club's AFLW captain and played in all 21 possible matches across her three seasons at the club.

== Early life and state league football ==
Farrugia was born and raised in the western suburbs of Sydney in New South Wales. Her parents are of Maltese descent and she attended Our Lady Queen of Peace Primary School in Greystanes. She began playing football in 2011 when she joined Macquarie University in the lower divisions of the Sydney Women's AFL (SWAFL). She missed the 2012 season while completing recovery for a knee reconstruction after sustaining a pre-season injury. In 2013, she won the league's division two best and fairest award, won the division two premiership with Macquarie University, and was named Best on Ground in the Grand Final. Farrugia was also awarded "Best Athlete" at the 2013 Macquarie University Sporting Awards. In 2015, she became captain of the club's division one side, a role she continued into the 2016. She was awarded the Mostyn Medal as the SWAFL's best and fairest player in the 2015 season. She finished second in the 2016 award, behind Sydney University's Nicola Barr.

Upon completion of the 2017 AFLW season, Farrugia returned to captain Macquarie University, who finished the 2017 season in third place. For the 2017 season, Farrugia was awarded her second Mostyn Medal; Barr polled highly again to finish as the runner-up.

In 2016, Farrugia played exhibition series matches for Greater Western Sydney's representative team. She joined the Western Bulldogs side in the year's women's all star match in September 2016.

== AFL Women's career ==
Farrugia was drafted by the Greater Western Sydney Giants with the club's eight pick and sixty-fourth overall in the 2016 AFL Women's draft. She was named the club's inaugural AFL Women's captain in January 2017.

Greater Western Sydney signed Farrugia for the 2018 season during the trade period in May 2017.

In November 2019, Farrugia announced her retirement from the game.

== Statistics ==
Legend
G	Goals	K	Kicks	D	Disposals	T	Tackles
B	Behinds	H	Handballs	M	Marks

Season	Team	No.	Games	Totals							Averages (per game)						
Season	Team	No.	Games	G	B	K	H	D	M	T	G	B	K	H	D	M	T
2017	Greater Western Sydney	18	7	0	0	49	14	63	14	27	0.0	0.0	7.0	2.0	9.0	2.0	3.9
2018	Greater Western Sydney	18	7	2	1	60	29	89	13	36	0.3	0.1	8.6	4.1	12.7	1.9	5.1
2019	Greater Western Sydney	18	7	0	0	33	26	59	11	16	0.0	0.0	4.7	3.7	8.4	1.6	2.3
Career			21	2	1	142	69	211	38	79	0.1	0.0	6.8	3.3	10.0	1.8	3.8

== Personal life ==
Off-field, Farrugia works as a physical education teacher at Our Lady Of Mercy College in Parramatta. She lives in the western Sydney suburb of Seven Hills.
