= Sutherland AFC =

Southern Power

Names
- Full name: Sutherland Australian Football Club
- Former name: Southern Sharks (1972-2008)
- Nickname(s): Southern Power, Pears
- Motto: The Home of Sutherland Shire Senior Football
- Club song: Along the Road to Gundagai

2025 season
- After finals: Men's Division 1: DNQ; Women's Division 2: Runners-up
- Home-and-away season: Men's Division 1: 7th Women's Division 2: 1st
- Leading goalkicker: Men's: Hayden Wallis (27 goals); Women's: Sienna Smith (62 goals)

Club details
- Founded: 1972; 54 years ago
- Colours: blue white black
- Competition: Sydney AFL
- President: Justin Lucas
- Coach: Men's Division 2 & 4 Matt Last; Men's Division 6 Paul Smith; Women's Division 1 Andrew Smith
- Captain(s): Hayden Wallis, Jamie Caetano, Dane Coombs
- Premierships: 6 (1984, 2010, 2011, 2013, 2019, 2024)
- Ground: Lincoln Oval (Waratah Park No. 4), Sutherland
- Former ground: Gwawley Park, Taren Point (1972-2016)

Uniforms
Home

Other information
- Official website: southernpower.com.au

The Sutherland Australian Football Club is an Australian rules football club based in the Sydney region of the Sutherland Shire. The Southern Power (as they are known) play their home games at Lincoln Oval (Waratah Park No. 4) in Sutherland. The club competes in the Sydney AFL competition, with 3 Men's and 1 Women's sides. Seniors compete in the Sydney AFL Division 2, Division 4, Division 6 and Women's Division 1.

== History ==
=== Formation ===
Sutherland Australian Football Club Inc. was founded in 1972 in the Sydney Football Association (SFA). Founding members included Kerry and Rob Mowlam (Rob was the First President), Ray Jemmeson, Graham Baldock and Bill Free. The club was known as the Southern Sharks until 2008 when, at an Extraordinary General Meeting, the club members voted unanimously to change their name to the Southern Power. Reasons behind the change included a desire for the Senior and Under 18's teams to play under the same team colours and emblem, and also a wish for the team differentiate itself from the many other teams in the region who had the Shark as their emblem.

After the consolidation of the SFA and SFL leagues in Sydney, the club ended up with teams in Division 2, Division 3 and U18s Division 2.

=== 1st Grade ===
Sydney AFL Division 1 (2011–2017), Sydney AFL Division 2 (2007-2010), AFL Sydney Platinum Division (2018-2023), AFL Sydney Division 2 (2024-current)

The team was elevated to Division 1 in 2011 after a long string of success which included 3 Division 2 Grand Final appearances in 2007, 2009, 2010 and a Premiership in 2010 against UTS Bats. The elevation to Division 1 in 2011 did not slow the club down and again the team made the Grand Final only to fall short of Manly Wolves by 10pts. The team again finished runners up in 2012, before triumphing over UNSW as premiers in 2013, with a Grand Final score of 105 to 20.

=== 2nd Grade ===
Sydney AFL Division 3 (2007–present)

=== 3rd Grade ===
Sydney AFL Division 4 (2010, 2012–present), Sydney AFL Division 5 (2011)

During 2010 the club experienced significant growth and consequently added a 3rd grade team which competed in Division 4. The 3rd graders finished 12th of 14 teams, with 5 wins from 18 games in their debut season. This resulted in the team being relegated to Division 5 in 2011.

However 2011 produced a marked improvement in the team through the addition of extra depth by new players and also another preseason under the belt of the returning fleet. The 3rd grade team finished top of the ladder and became undefeated Division 5 2011 Premiers when they defeated Manly Wolves by 14pts in the Grand Final. This premiership success resulted in the team being promoted back to Division 4 for the 2012 season.

=== Under 19's ===
Sydney AFL U19's Division 2 (2007–present)

=== Women's ===
Sydney Women's AFL (2010–present)

== Club identity and culture ==
=== Guernseys ===
The club's colours represent the southern Sydney region colloquially known as the Shire. The colours are light blue (teal), black and white, with a hand holding a lightning bolts the team emblem. While these colours (and guernseys) have morphed over the years, they remain essentially the same as they have since the club's foundation.

== Club honours ==
=== Premierships ===
- 1984 - Sydney AFL SFA First Division Seniors - Premiers
- 1984 - Sydney AFL SFA First Division Reserves - Premiers
- 1986 - Sydney AFL SFA First Division Reserves - Premiers
- 2010 - Sydney AFL Division Two - Premiers
- 2011 - Sydney AFL Division Five - Premiers
- 2012 - Sydney AFL Under 18s Division 2 - Premiers
- 2013 - Sydney AFL Division One - Premiers
- 2018 - Sydney AFL Platinum Division Reserves - Premiers
- 2019 - Sydney AFL Platinum Division Seniors - Premiers
- 2019 - Sydney AFL Platinum Division Reserves - Premiers
- 2024 - Sydney AFL Division Two - Premiers

== Individual honours ==
==== Snow Medal Winners ====
- Andrew Bawden - 2003
- Andrew Craig - 2004, 2012
- Jason Philp - 2006 & 2007
- Stuart Brierty - 2013

==== 200+ Games ====
- Ryan King-Thornburg
- Marshall Cairnduff
- Liam Hamling
