= Hawkesbury Jets AFC =

Hawkesbury Jets

Names
- Full name: Hawkesbury Jets Australian Football Club
- Nickname: Jets
- Club song: It's A Brand New Flag

Club details
- Founded: 2001; 25 years ago
- Colours: red, white, black
- Competition: AFL Sydney
- Ground: Bensons Lane

Uniforms
| Home | Clash |

Other information
- Official website: nor-westjets.com (defunct)

Hawkesbury Jets Australian Football Club are an Australian rules football club based in Sydney, Australia. Previously known as Nor-West Jets (2001-2021), the club colours are red, white, and black. The Jets have teams in the Third and Fifth Divisions of the AFL Sydney league.

The Jets home ground is Bensons Lane located in the north-western Sydney suburb of Richmond.

== History ==
Club logo from 2001-2021

Premierships: 2005 and 2006 (Second Division)
