= Australian rules football in New South Wales =

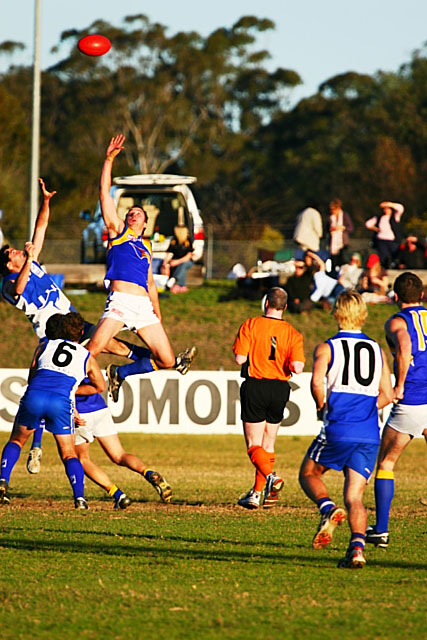
- Two ruckmen contest the bounce in a suburban western Sydney AFL game between the East Coast Eagles AFC and Campbelltown Kangaroos AFC.
- Governing body: AFL NSW/ACT
- Representative team: NSW/ACT
- First played: Sydney 17 June 1865; 161 years ago
- Registered players: 80,572 (adult); 42,396 (child)
- Clubs: 260

Club competitions
- Sydney AFL AFL Hunter Central Coast; AFL Canberra; AFL Sapphire Coast; AFL South Coast; AFL North Coast; AFL North West; AFL Central West; Farrer Football League; Riverina Football League; Northern Riverina Football League; AFL South Coast; Hume Football League; Broken Hill Football League

Audience records
- Single match: 72,393 (2003). Sydney Swans Football Club v. Collingwood Football Club. (Telstra Stadium, Sydney)

In New South Wales and its capital city Sydney, Australian rules football dates back to the 1860s colonial era, being the first and for a time the only code played. The club competition in Sydney first began in the 1880s and has since the early 1900s held a continuous existence. The sport is popular in the regional cities and towns of the state near the Victorian and South Australian borders— in the Riverina-Murray region (around the Murray River and Murrumbidgee Rivers) and in Broken Hill where it has a long history. These areas form part of an Australian cultural divide described as the Barassi Line. To the west of the line it is commonly known as "football" or "Australian Football" and to east of the line, it is promoted under the acronym "AFL" by the main development body AFL NSW/ACT. There are more than 15 regional leagues though some are run from other states, the highest profile are AFL Sydney and the Riverina Football Netball League. With 80,572 registered players, it has the third most of any jurisdiction.

The state is the sport's second largest audience with the Australian Football League (AFL) Premiership Season generating more than a million television viewers. Two clubs based in the state capital Sydney currently compete in the AFL and AFL Women's (AFLW): the Sydney Swans and the Greater Western Sydney Giants. The Swans in 1982 became the first professional Australian sporting team to move interstate, and entered the AFLW in Season 7 (2022). The Giants debuted in the 2012 AFL season and 2017 AFL Women's season and compete against the Swans in the Sydney Derby (also known as "The Battle of the Bridge").

The representative team, nicknamed the Blues, played interstate matches against other Australian states and Territories between 1881 and 1988. The Blues have a strong record, defeating every state and territory except South Australia. They have long standing rivalries with Victoria accounting for them in 1923, 1925, and in 1990 under State of Origin rules at the Sydney Cricket Ground, and Queensland which was evenly contested from 1884. WR 'Billy' McKoy holds the record for the number of representative caps for New South Wales with 31. Sydney hosted national carnivals in 1914, 1933, 1960 and 1974. The underage Blues also claimed Under 19 national championships in 1974 and 1975 as well as a Division 2 title in 1993.

Some of the greatest names in the sport hail from the state including its leading pioneers, cousins Tom Wills and H. C. A. Harrison, who were born there. Over 400 players have competed in the AFL including two Legends in the Australian Football Hall of Fame: Haydn Bunton Sr. and Jock McHale. The New South Wales born and raised player with the most AFL games and most AFL goals is Tom Hawkins with 359 games and 796 goals while Sophie Casey has the most AFLW games with 63, and Zarlie Goldsworthy has the most AFLW goals with 16.

== History ==
=== First clubs and matches (1861–1868) ===
The Federal Football Club is claimed to have been formed in Wagga Wagga in 1861, making it the oldest Australian rules football club outside of Victoria and the oldest football club of any code in New South Wales, however little else of the early history of the club now known as the Wagga Tigers is known. Its first recorded interclub matches did not appear for at least another decade.

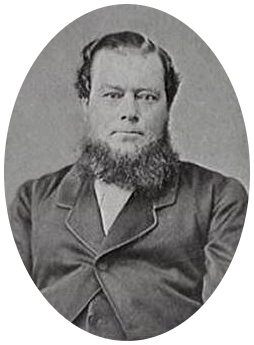
Richard Driver, founding president of the Sydney Football Club, Sydney's first, which formally adopted the code in May 1866

On 26 May 1865, calls were put out to form a Sydney Football Club (Sydney FC). The club was incorporated on 17 June 1865 with cricket administrator Richard Driver as its first president and up to 60 members, of whom were mostly cricketers. Driver was familiar with Victorian cricketer and football pioneer Tom Wills with their sporting paths overlapping many times between 1857 and 1865 in both Melbourne and Sydney. The Sydney FC played its first match shortly thereafter in Hyde Park, Sydney, and in August against the Sydney University FC. Meanwhile the Australian FC, an arm of the Australian Cricket Club, was also formed and played games that same winter.

At its first annual meeting on 8 May 1866, the Sydney FC confirmed its playing rules were the Victorian football rules and that it had received a challenge from the Melbourne FC wanting to travel north for inter-colonial matches. The Australian FC was also a follower of the Victorian rules.On 26 May 1866, the rules were published in Bells Life in Sydney. Both clubs failed to reappear in 1867.

In 1868, a new Sydney FC was founded also adopting the Victorian rules, citing their popularity in Melbourne as the main reason for the choice. Few details survive of their matches apart from one held against the 50th (Queen's Own) Regiment on 11 July 1868. Sydney journalists applauded the rising interest in Victorian rules, though they referred to it, without using its Melbourne name, in the broad "old English game of football" sense.

The Sydney University FC is often noted as "The Birthplace of Australian Rugby" in 1863; however, historical newspaper records show its first games were in 1865 and that it did not begin playing by rugby rules until 1870.

Unlike football in other colonies, early club football in Sydney struggled to take root. As was the case for the fledgling contemporary Brisbane Football Club in the Queensland colony, Sydney's clubs (unlike those of Melbourne and Adelaide in the colony of South Australia) struggled to recruit enough football players for organised matches. Without intercolonial competition and with few playing, newcomer clubs soon disbanded. The growing city of Newcastle, however defied the trend, revising the Rules of Football (the Victorian Rules), and publishing it in its press.

One of the first Sydney schools to adopt the Victorian code was Newington College in 1867 by its then headmaster and ex-Geelong FC player and vice-president George Metcalfe.A number of history sources refer to an 1869 match between Newington and Sydney University FC as the colony's first rugby game, however there are no contemporaneous sources verifying the game took place, nor under what rules.

=== Rugby rebellion and the Southern Rugby Football Union ban (1870–1876) ===
Some players, I am aware, can't swallow the idea of adopting the Victorian Game, simply because it is supposed to hail from the sister colony.

— Reporter, The Sydney Mail

While Victorian rules had been the only distinguishable football code played in the Sydney over the last half of the 1860s, at no time had it (or any other set of laws) established a firm foothold and permanent clubs, leaving the arrival of the rugby-dedicated Wallaroo FC in 1870 an open field. In 1874 the Wallaroos led the formation of the Southern Rugby Football Union (SRFU / now NSWRU) who adopted the rugby union playing laws of the London-based Rugby Football Union, as well as a by-law that each member (club or school) could only play games against another member, meaning any attempt to establish a Victorian rules club in Sydney was futile.

In the Riverina closer to Victoria however, clubs were able to somewhat survive it. The Albury Football Club (founded in 1876 under Victorian rules) did so by crossing the border to play against northern Victorian clubs though even it was all but defunct the following year, requiring resuscitation some time later. Other early northern Riverina clubs such as Wagga were left with little other option than to organise local scratch matches as most other clubs in the colony were adopting rugby. Calls from Victoria in May 1877 for intercolonial tests were dismissed by the SRFU in an effort to prevent the Victorian code from being promoted in Sydney.

=== Intercolonial football and establishment of competitions in the Riverina, Sydney, Newcastle and Broken Hill (1877–1893) ===
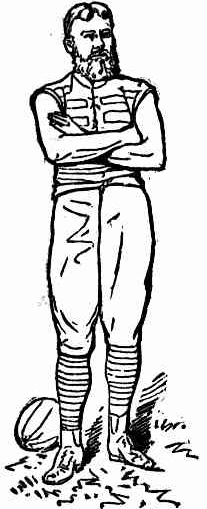
Harry Hedger the former Waratahs Southern Rugby Union player, who founded the NSWFA in Sydney in 1880, was also a key player in the founding of the NSWFL in 1903 and its first life member in 1905.

In June 1877, Sydney's Waratah Rugby Football Club (formed in 1873 but now defunct) accepted a challenge from Victoria's Carlton Football Club to reciprocal matches in their respective codes, and in doing so, risked expulsion from the union. The SRFU refused to sanction the match, and fearing the effect of promoting the Victorian code, fixtured a competing match at Parramatta. The match, hosted by Waratah, was played at the Albert Ground under rugby rules in front of 3,000 spectators—then the largest ever football crowd in Sydney—was won by Waratah 2–0. Defunct newspaper publication The Argus noted that the Victorians were not lacking in skills, just their knowledge of the game. The second match was played in front of a smaller crowd of about 1,500 at the Albert Ground with the result being Carlton 6–0. Among the best players were George Coulthard, who showed a particular prowess in both codes despite having never played rugby. When Waratah toured Victoria in July 1878, a crowd of 8,000 at the Melbourne Cricket Ground witnessed Carlton and Waratah draw scores in rugby, while a smaller crowd of 6,000 witnessed a surprise victory against Carlton by 2 goals in Victorian rules.

At the same time the Sydney University FC (rugby rules club) was advocating for the SRFU and its member clubs to change its rules and in effect switch codes to Australian rules.The following season in 1878 the University club negotiated with the Melbourne FC for a visit (which did not proceed) to Sydney to play Victorian rules games. The University club's continued agitation aided momentum towards establishing the rival code in Sydney.

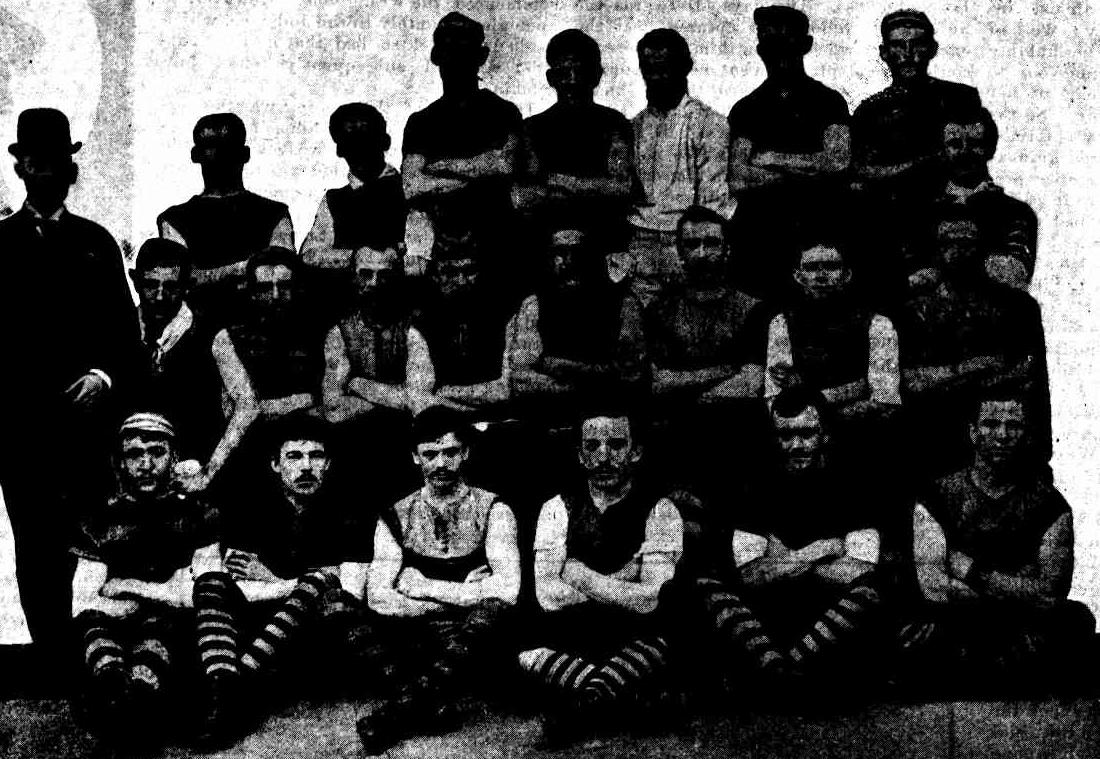
Waratah Football Club (pictured in 1890); the club was pivotal in the revival of Australian rules in Sydney from the 1870s.

By 1880, Waratah and other Sydney clubs began initiating proposed changes to rugby amid growing dissatisfaction over the game's rules. Rugby interests, particularly NSWRU officials from Wallaroo FC, repeatedly rejected suggestions to switch codes or even play intercolonial matches under alternating rules against Victoria despite the NSW Cricket association making its grounds available for the proposed matches. In response, the proponents of the Australian game, led by Harry Hedger and George Walker, formed the New South Wales Football Association (NSWFA) in 1880. One of the vice-presidents of the SRFU resigned from his position to take position on the newly formed NSWFA board.

Despite their support for change and Victorian rules, the Waratah and Sydney University clubs at first stood aloof from the new body, as the founding members were Sydney (the third club by that name) and East Sydney. In 1881, the first Australian rules game between NSW and Victoria was played in Sydney. The NSWFA only had a few clubs, including Waratah which switched codes in 1882. A splinter University club from the rugby club, the Sydney University Australian National Football Club also formed in 1887 to join the competition. From 1889, clubs competed for the Flanagan Cup. Despite this, the Sydney Rugby Football Union, seeing the new competition as a threat, enforced a strict ban on every one of its member clubs playing Victorian rules.Meanwhile, the city's private schools Saint Ignatius' College, Riverview and St Joseph's College, Hunters Hill started playing the code.

In the Riverina several clubs had formed prior to 1882 including two in Wagga and Albury and one in Narrandera however they initially struggled to coordinate with nearby clubs due to the SRFU ban. The first recorded match there was in 1881 between Federal (Wagga) and Albury Football Club in Wagga, just a year before the first rugby matches were held in the region. Local competition between clubs commenced in earnest in 1884 around Wagga Wagga which became the Wagga Football Association.

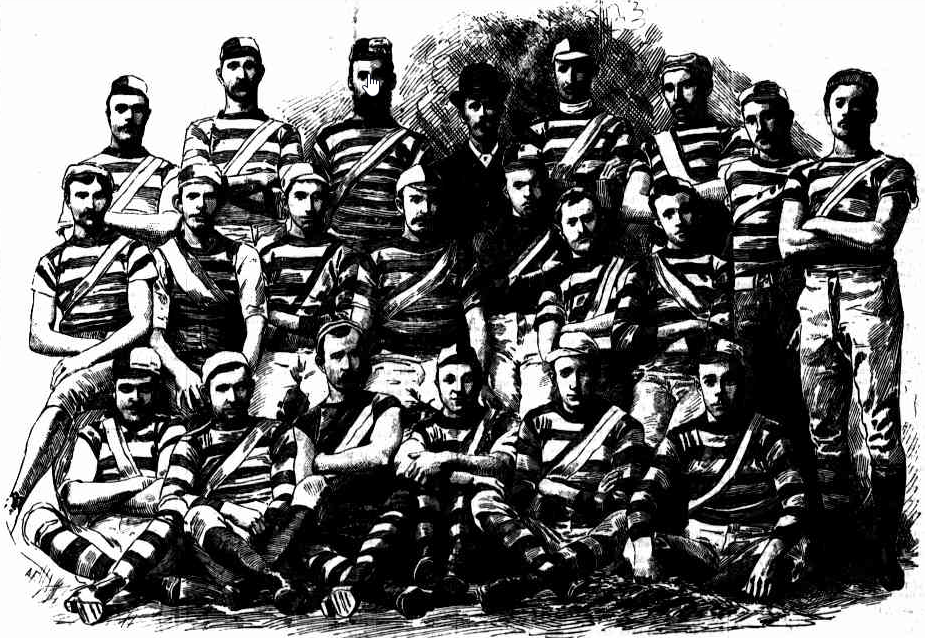
Northumberland Football Club, Newcastle premiers in 1887. The club was founded in 1881 and was the first club to adopt the code in the Northern District.

The game was introduced to Newcastle, New South Wales, in 1883 when the Wallsend and Plattsburg Football Club was formed by miners from Ballarat, though some sources claim that it has been played in the Northern District even earlier than 1881. In 1883, a touring South Melbourne Football Club defeated a combined Northern District team by only one goal. In 1888, a touring defeated Wallsend by 10–5. The following year, Wallsend defeated Fitzroy. The Northern District Football Association around Newcastle began in 1886, with teams from 1888 competing for the Black Diamond Cup, Australia's oldest existing and active (revived) sporting trophy. Five clubs were established in the Newcastle area: Newcastle City, Wallsend and Plattsburg, Northumberland, Lambton, and Singleton.

South Melbourne was the second club to visit New South Wales in 1883, defeating the Sydney Football Club by just a single goal in front of a large crowd at the Sydney Cricket Ground, and in a goal in front of 600 spectators during a game against East Sydney Football Club. Waratah played against South Australia in 1884 at Moore Park.

New South Wales competed against Queensland in 1884, initially losing to its northern neighbour before gaining primacy in their 1886 matches. It also competed against a touring New Zealand Native football team on 29 June 1889, with the result being a 4–4 draw.In September 1888 the first inter-varsity football match ever held in Australia took place between the Sydney University Australian National Football Club and Melbourne University FC.

Australian football was first played in Broken Hill in 1885 between Day Dream and Silverton. Informal competition began in 1888 between four clubs. The Barrier Ranges Football Association formed in 1890, which later became the Broken Hill Football League.

The NSWFA had trouble gaining access to enclosed grounds and gate receipts. With its two clubs divided, it collapsed in 1893.

=== Post-Federation, NSW Football League era (1903–1917) ===
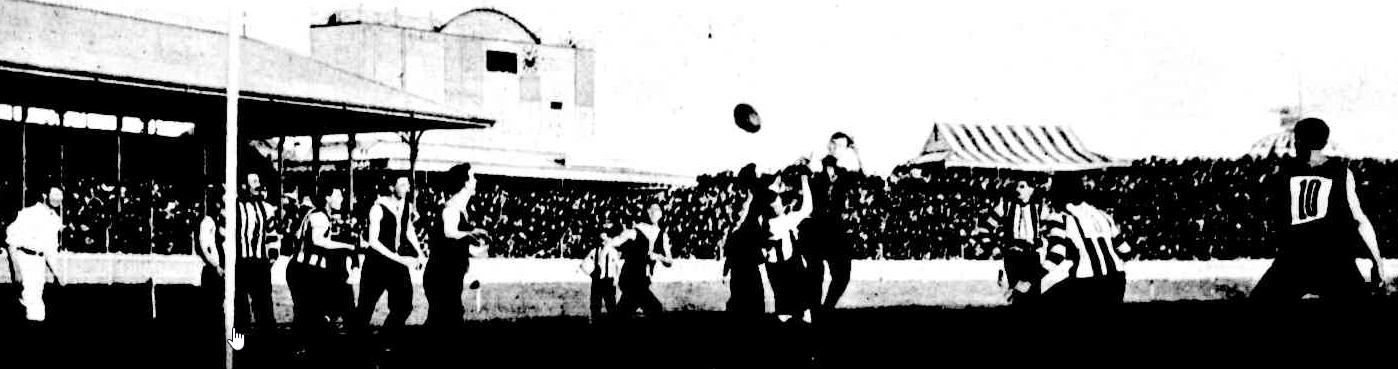
A match between VFL clubs Fitzroy and Collingwood at the SCG in 1903 attracted more than 20,000 spectators. The league would not see crowds like this in Sydney for another 50 years.

With the Federation of Australia, the Australian code in Sydney was revived. The NSW Football League, later the NSW Australian Football League (NSWAFL), was formed on 12 February 1903 at a meeting held in the YMCA Hall in George St. The competition started with extreme enthusiasm with a total of 11 clubs signing up to contest the opening season in 1903 (including: East Sydney FC, Ashfield Electorate FC, North Shore FC, North Sydney FC, South Sydney FC, YMCA FC, Paddington FC, Redfern FC, West Sydney FC, Newtown FC, Sydney FC and Balmain FC), with East Sydney taking out the first premiership with a 6-point win over North Shore. The NSWAFL promoted the game in schools and lobbied for VFL exhibition matches in Sydney to promote the code.

The first Victorian Football League match played in Sydney was with Fitzroy Football Club 7–10, defeating the Collingwood Football Club 6–9 at the Sydney Cricket Ground on 24 May 1903. The large attendance of 20,000 saw the exhibition hailed as a success and inspired the league to continue scheduling more matches in Sydney. However, follow-up matches quickly began to attract cynicism from the Sydney football public, as a VFL push when Geelong Football Club 8.7 (55) defeated Carlton Football Club 6.9 (45) at the SCG a few months later. The matches were seen by the Sydney media as an attempt to force-feed the Victorian game to Sydneysiders who had plenty of rugby to attract their ongoing interest. The crowd of 5,000 was much smaller than those of rugby games in the city. In 1904, Melbourne Football Club 9–17 (71) defeated Essendon Football Club 6–3 (39) in front of 6,000 people. Without any interest, top-level VFL disappeared from Sydney for decades.

The first played on the North Coast was at Lismore in June 1903 was between two local teams and initially proved popular.

In contrast to the reception of the game at professional level, the grassroots level was having enormous success, growing the game in the schools with 48 in Sydney, including all the Roman Catholic schools playing Australian Football, by 1905.

In 1907, New South Wales defeated South Australian powerhouse Port Adelaide Football Club 8–9 to 5–14 in front of 4,000 spectators at Sydney Showground. Another South Australian club, Norwood Football Club, toured with Victorian club Carlton, playing a match in front of 7,000 at the Showgrounds. North Adelaide Football Club also toured in 1910 to play against New South Wales at Erskineville Oval, which attracted 2,000 spectators. In 1911, Geelong toured and played a combined Sydney side at Alexandria in front of 6,000 spectators. Dally Messenger contributed to the paid football code of rugby league; as a result, rugby established itself into the culture of Sydney in 1908.

Although Australian football remained popular, the NSWAFL was still denied access to enclosed grounds, and the new professional code of rugby league further lured players from Australian rules. By 1911, however, Australian rules were supported more than the rugby union, according to The Referee.

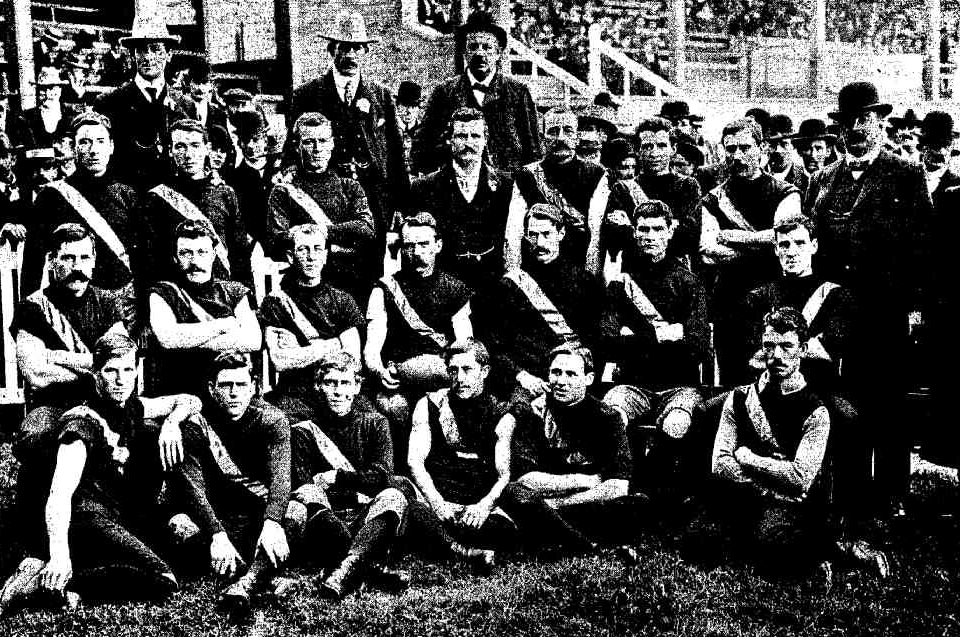
Broken Hill representative team that toured Adelaide in 1904

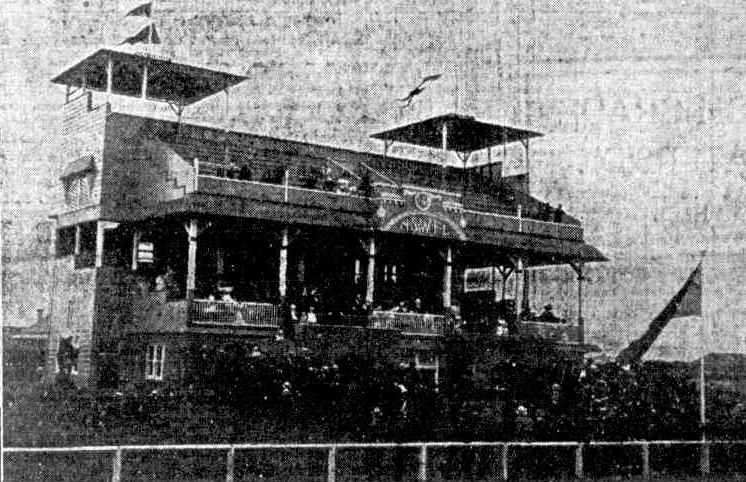
The new NSWFL grandstand at Alexandria in 1912 was available for just a few years before the NSWFL was shut out of the ground.

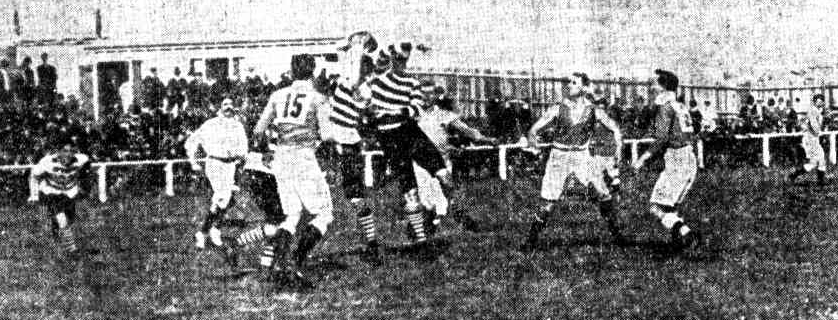
Combined Sydney played Geelong FC in front of 6,000 in 1912 at Alexandria.

=== Interwar popularity surge, interstate success, and proposed Rugby League amalgamation (1918–1939) ===
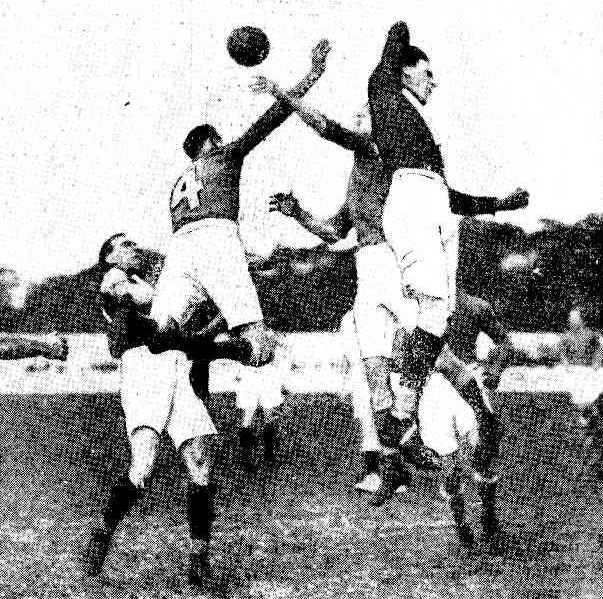
New South Wales' had their first ever victory against Victoria by 15 points at the Sydney Cricket Ground in 1923. It proved not to be a once off as the Blues repeated the feat in 1925.

Popularity peaked in 1921 when attendances at the Sydney competition grew from hundreds to thousands. While increased gate takings were funding an increase in playing standard and junior development, the local league had exclusive access only to Erskineville Oval and Hampden Oval, relatively small grounds, and had difficulty scheduling matches used by the rugby authorities.

During the 1920s, funded by a NSWAFL in Sydney and a thriving schoolboys competition, NSW defeated Victorian sides on several occasions at home, notably Melbourne Football Club on 28 July 1923, the VFL at the SCG in 1923, and again at Erskineville Oval by one point on 15 August 1925.

The Australian National Football carnival of 1933 was held at the Sydney Cricket Ground. Several matches drew large crowds, particularly those involving New South Wales, Victoria, Queensland, South Australia and West Australia.

Following the successful interstate football carnival in 1933, a proposal by the New South Wales Rugby League to amalgamate Australian football and rugby league was investigated. A report, with a set of proposed rules known as Universal football, was prepared by the secretary of the NSWRL, Harold R. Miller, and sent to the Australian National Football Council. A trial game was held in secret, but plans were never instituted.

Three of the original NSWAFL clubs are still in existence and currently play in the Sydney AFL: North Shore, East Sydney (now UNSW-ES), and Balmain, but the league remained almost entirely amateur with limited audience following and sponsorship.

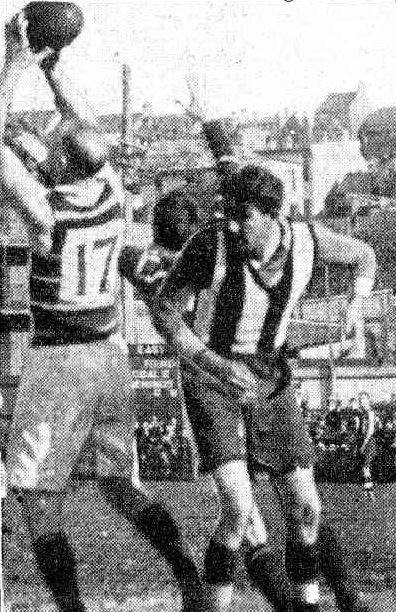
East vs. Newtown Trumper Park Oval, 1931

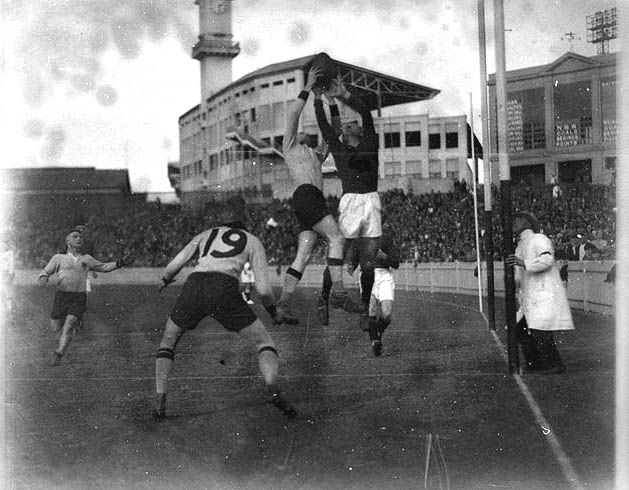
A New South Wales player marks over a West Australian opponent in the goal square at the 1933 Sydney Carnival held at the SCG.

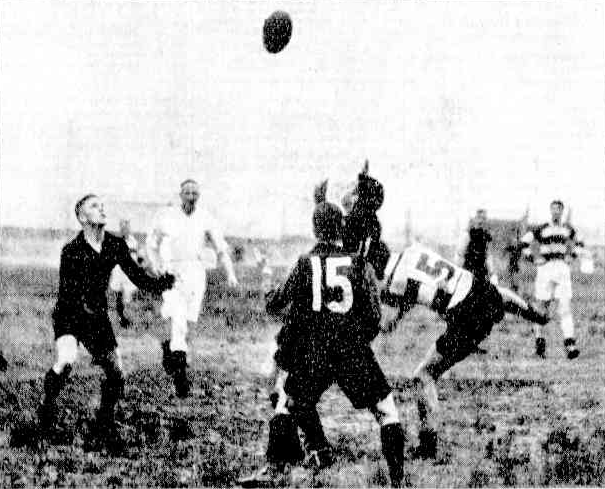
Newcastle vs. Sydney North Shore at the Newcastle Showground in 1935

=== Post-war decline and VFL intervention (1940s–1970s) ===
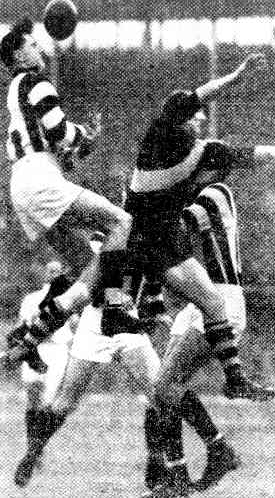
Richmond vs. Collingwood match at SCG in 1952

World War II proved a massive setback for the code in Sydney; the government insisted that the league cease operations. Struggling Sydney clubs were propped up by visiting servicemen from traditional Australian rules states. Despite this, between 1953 and 1957, the game survived in parts of Sydney, Newcastle, and Wollongong. Several junior clubs and leagues were established. The St. George and Sutherland Shire Junior Australian Football Association was established in southern Sydney and consisted of Penshurst Junior Australian Football Club (JAFC) Panthers, Miranda JAFC Bombers, St. Patrick's Ramsgate (later Ramsgate JAFC Rams), Heathcote JAFC Hawks, Cronulla JAFC Sharks, Peakhurst, Como-Jannali, Boys' Town, Cronulla Blues, and St. Patrick's Sutherland.

Top level VFL returned to the SCG on 14 June 1952 when Collingwood 10–12 (72) defeated Richmond 5–6 (36) in front of 24,174 spectators in wet conditions as part of "National Day Round". Another match in the same round in Albury at the Albury Sports Ground attracted a record crowd of 15,000. However, the league would not return for another decade.

In the early 1960s the game began to set roots in parts of the state it had not been played in before. The first game played in New England occurred in Armidale between the University of New England and Moree in 1962 which grew briefly to 3 teams and regular competition from 1963. The game also became established on the South Coast at a senior level with the establishment of the South Coast AFL in 1969.

The NSWAFL, under immense pressure due to dwindling interest had called upon the VFL to help jumpstart the code. The first broadcast of a VFL match in Sydney and Canberra was the 1965 VFL Grand Final. In 1967 the VFL arranged a television broadcast arrangement to Sydney for the first time via Channel 2 replays watched by approximately 70,000 Sydneysiders. The league also VFL agreed to play annual matches at the Sydney Cricket Ground to assist in lifting the profile of the local competition. As part of this initiative in 1967 Essendon played Geelong in front of 23,777; in 1968 St Kilda played Carlton in front of 22,472; and in 1969 Melbourne played Collingwood in front of 14,610. However falling interest and gate takings saw the league pull out of the Sydney experiment once again.

In 1971 the VFL game of the round was broadcast live into Sydney for the first time on TCN 9 with an average audience of around 100,000.

=== Establishment of a Sydney VFL team and relocation of the Swans (1976–1981) ===
In 1976, Melbourne journalist Jim Main began to break a story that a leading Melbourne businessman who had relocated to Sydney, Mannie Bongornio, had been meeting with Allen Aylett about luring a VFL club to Sydney. The idea began to gain traction and in 1977, Ron Barassi proposed the VFL setting up a club in Sydney, which he offered to coach believing that it would help spread the code in the state. Upon becoming league president, Aylett had the league investigated playing Sunday matches at the SCG. The VFL scheduled 2 premiership matches for the SCG in 1979. One of them, between the previous year's grand finalists North Melbourne and Hawthorn, drew a record 31,395 to the gates. Researching and testing the market, the VFL scheduled four matches for the SCG in 1980 with an average attendance of 19,000. In April 1980, the VFL stated that its market study showed there was sufficient support for a Sydney team, finding that there was an increase in television ratings in Sydney and sustained attendance at matches and that it intended to have a team in Sydney, possibly as soon as 1982. Fitzroy Lions, in a financial struggle, was prevented from conducting a feasibility study into the possibility of moving to North Sydney; a proposal was put forward, but was voted down by its board in 1980.

The game was first played in the Coffs Harbour area as late as 1978. The North Coast Australian Football League was formed in 1982 and grew rapidly with up to eight clubs by 2000.

A 1981 report by Graham Huggins concluded that there was an "untapped market in Sydney which represented an excellent opportunity for the league." The report claimed that 60,000 people in Sydney had stated that they would regularly support the new club: 90% of these supporters would watch VFL on television from Sydney, 80% of these supporters had not attended rugby, and 92% believed that Australian rules could become popular in Sydney. Following the report, the VFL announced that the league had decided to put a team in Sydney in 1982. Financially struggling VFL club South Melbourne, fearing a missed opportunity to establish a new market, announced its decision to play all 1982 home games in Sydney. After playing, the VFL formally approved the Swans shift to Sydney on 29 July 1981, becoming the first team based outside of Victoria.

In 1981 and 1982 the code expanded into the Central West with clubs established in Parkes, and Dubbo followed by clubs in Cowra, Orange and Young commencing the Central West Australian Football League.

=== One team town, Sydney Swans era (1982–2012) ===
In 1982, the club was renamed the Sydney Swans. The relocation of Swans from South Melbourne to Sydney included sponsorship away from the local Australian rules football clubs and leagues, and there was an initial decline in the sport locally. The Swans' debt, much of it to the AFL, not only hung over attempts to establish the Sydney Swans but now burdened Australian rules football in New South Wales.

In 1983 five clubs in on the southern coast formed the Sapphire Coast Australian Football League.

During the mid-1980s there was a small increase in professional players recruited from Sydney, one of the highest profile of which was Russell Morris who debuted in 1984. Up to this point however the majority of the Swans players were either Victorian or from the Riverina. This began to change as the Swans were given a dedicated zone from which to recruit players from the local competition. One of the first locally recruited players was Mark Roberts who debuted in 1985.

On 31 July 1985, Dr. Geoffrey Edelsten, through Powerplay Limited, bought the Sydney Swans for $2.9 million in cash with debt payments, funding and other payments spread over five years. Powerplay was floated and sold shares to supports and the public, but with only a licence for the team and debts, the uptake was poor. Within less than twelve months, Edelsten resigned as chairman, and by 1988, the licence was sold back to the VFL for just $10. The AFL appointed a board to operate the team in order to take control of the club's financial losses. Board members Mike Willesee and Craig Kimberley, together with Basil Sellers Peter Weinert as a consortium known as the Private Ownership Group, purchased the licence and operated the Sydney Swans until 1993, when the AFL again took over ownership of the team.

The impact of the Swans on the Sydney Football League was heavy. The competition had built up a following and was semi-professional. That changed with the Swans introduction as supporters left the local competition. Among the casualties was the historic foundation club Newtown which folded in 1987.

In 1988 the number of schools playing the code was 110, which had grown to 160 in 1994.

With substantial monetary and management support from the AFL, the Sydney Swans continued and with player draft concessions in the early 1990s, and fielded a competitive team throughout the decade.

In 1992, the NSW Australian Football League Ltd (NSW AFL) was founded to govern the Sydney AFL and affiliate competitions. Its right to govern the code across the state was disputed by the AFL Commission in Melbourne who were able to gradually usurp it between 1994 to 1998 as a growing number of competitions affiliated to it.

==== Sydney's first Grand Final appearance, Super League War and AFL audience growth (1996–1998) ====
The Swans under Ron Barassi successfully recruited Tony "Plugger" Lockett in 1995 who became a cult figure in Sydney, with an instant impact and along with the Super League war ravaging Sydney's popular rugby league competition. He helped the Swans to become a powerhouse Sydney icon. Lockett's heroics spearheading the club included the Preliminary final in which his kick after the siren saw the Swans win by a point against Essendon to secure a spot in the 1996 Grand Final, the club's first since moving to Sydney. While the club ultimately lost the 1996 AFL Grand Final to North Melbourne, the publicity of the Grand Final saw audiences peak and a great many Sydneysiders experiencing the sport for the first time. Average home crowds for the Swans peaked at 36,612 in 1997.

With two rival national rugby league competitions running in 1997 saw the popularity of the Swans reach new heights as disenfranchised rugby league fans began to take an interest in the code. AFL audiences grew dramatically and average home crowds for the Swans peaked at 36,612 in 1997.

==== First AFL premiership for Sydney and AFL expansion plans (1999–2011) ====
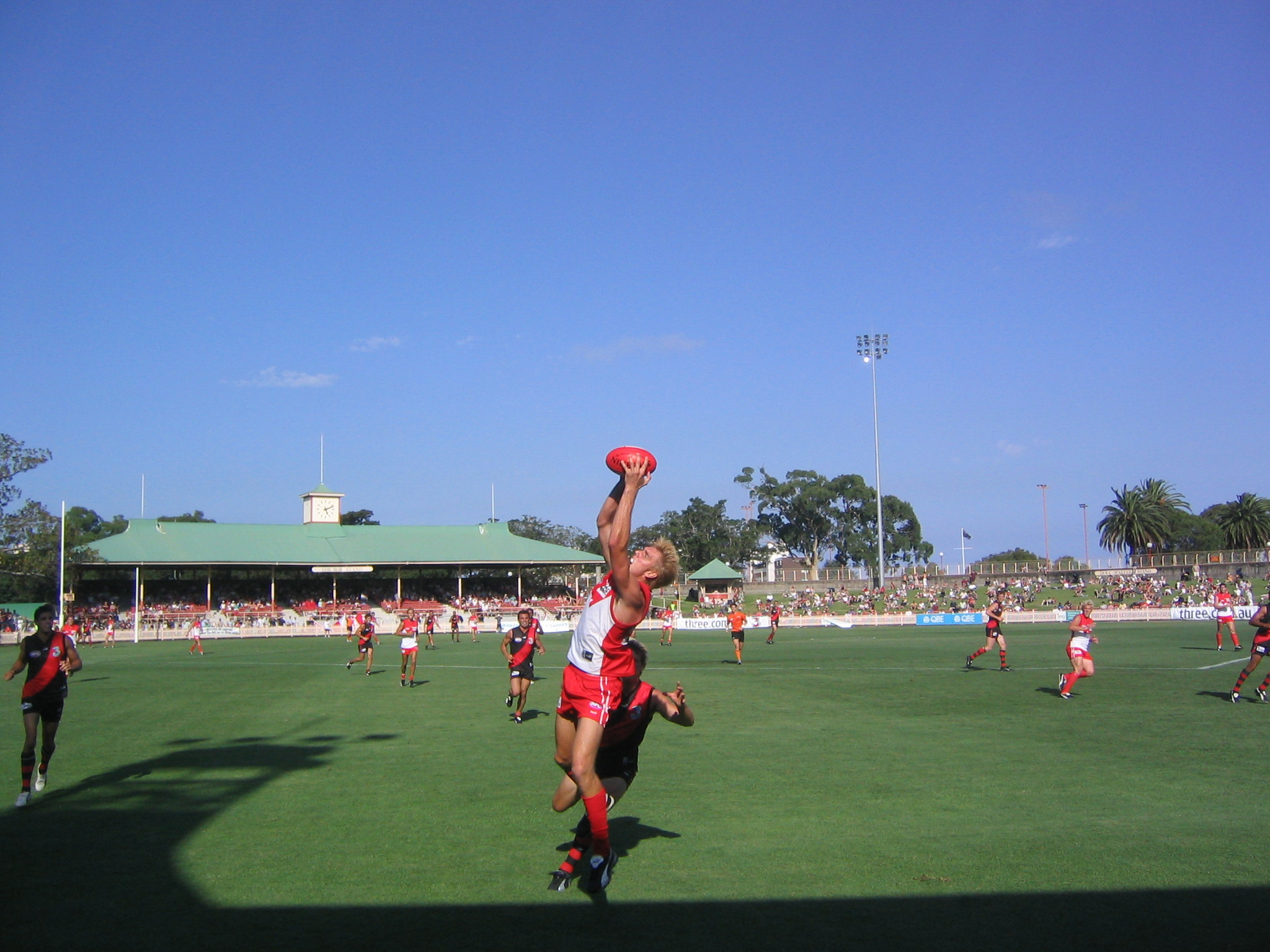
AFL pre-season matches began at North Sydney Oval between Sydney and Essendon in the early 2000s with a record 9,654 attending in 2005

On the back of four subsequent years of Swans finals appearances, junior numbers, stagnant for many decades, began to move in Sydney and across the state. The AFL in 1999 established the AFL NSW/ACT Commission Limited to govern its expansion in New South Wales and the Australian Capital Territory. The league began a strong push for a second team in Sydney, considering the proposed relocation of the North Melbourne Football Club as the best option, facilitating home matches in Sydney and dropping North Melbourne from its name to become the "Kangaroos" in an effort to grow the audience. However, poor attendance at the Kangaroos Sydney matches, low television viewership, and strong opposition from the Sydney Swans soon saw an end to the push.

Junior numbers began to increase, particularly in the south of Sydney and Wollongong Region from 1999.

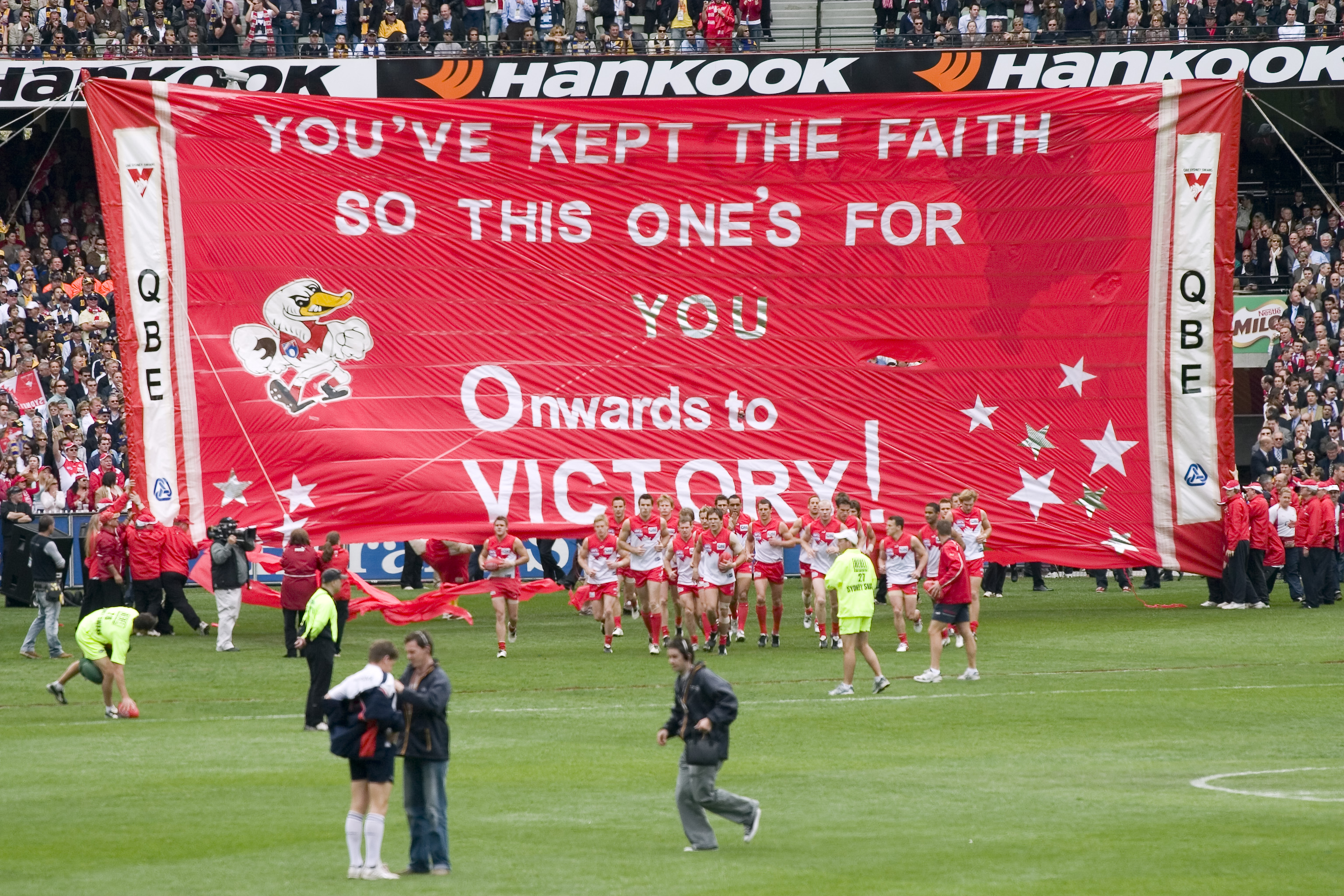
Sydney's first AFL premiership team running through the banner at the start of the 2005 AFL Grand Final

After a period of success in Sydney, the Swans reached once again reached the Grand Final and won 2005 premiership against the West Coast Eagles taking the flag to Sydney for the first time. It also broke the longest premiership drought in the history of the competition.

In 2005, the AFL went on a Sydney-centric recruitment drive, offering a NSW scholarships program and young apprentice scheme. By 2007, at least two of the NSW and ACT scholarship recipients had been officially promoted to AFL rookie lists, qualifying them for selection in the senior squad in the event of long-term injury to listed players.

In 2008, the AFL stated their intention to establish a second team in Sydney to be based in the western suburbs, as part of the expansion of the competition.

The Swans again came to prominence with the club's win in the 2012 AFL Grand Final.

=== Two team era: Greater Western Sydney Giants and the AFL Women's (2012–) ===
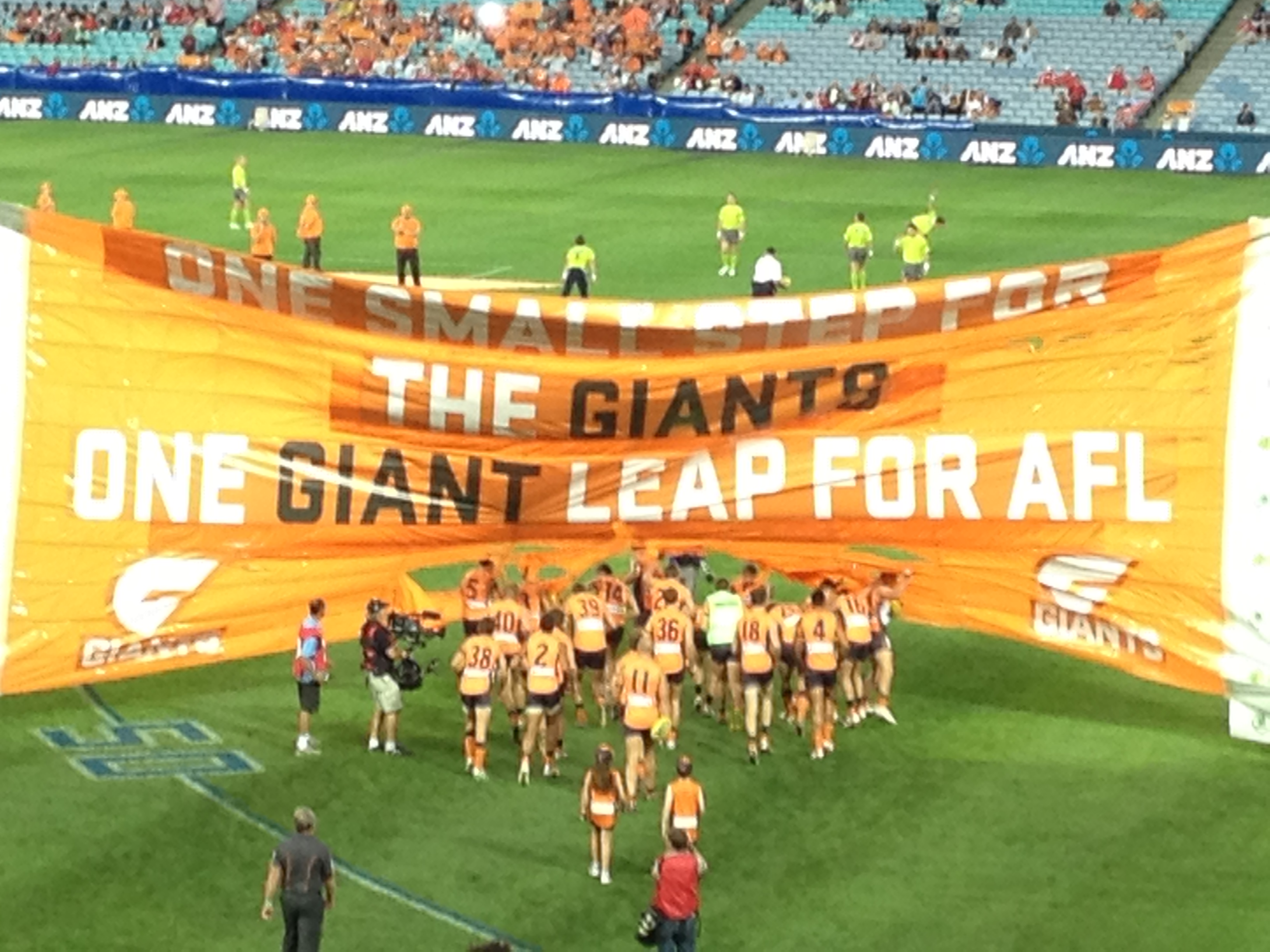
GWS Giants banner at the inaugural "Sydney Derby" at Stadium Australia in 2012

The Greater Western Sydney Giants were established in 2011, playing a season in the North East Australian Football League prior to commencing competition in the Australian Football League in 2012. The Giants struggled in their early years, winning only three games in their first two seasons, but since then, made gradual progress up the ladder, culminating in a Grand Final appearance in 2019. Although the Giants have been somewhat successful on the field, despite more than $200 million in AFL investment, the club has made little impact in growing attendance, television viewership, or participation in the region.

During the 2010s there was a dramatic increase in AFL players coming from the Sydney region, and in 2007, a total of 11 AFL players identified themselves as coming from this region.

GWS was awarded a license for the inaugural AFL Women's season with the Sydney Swans, deciding not to bid for entry until later.

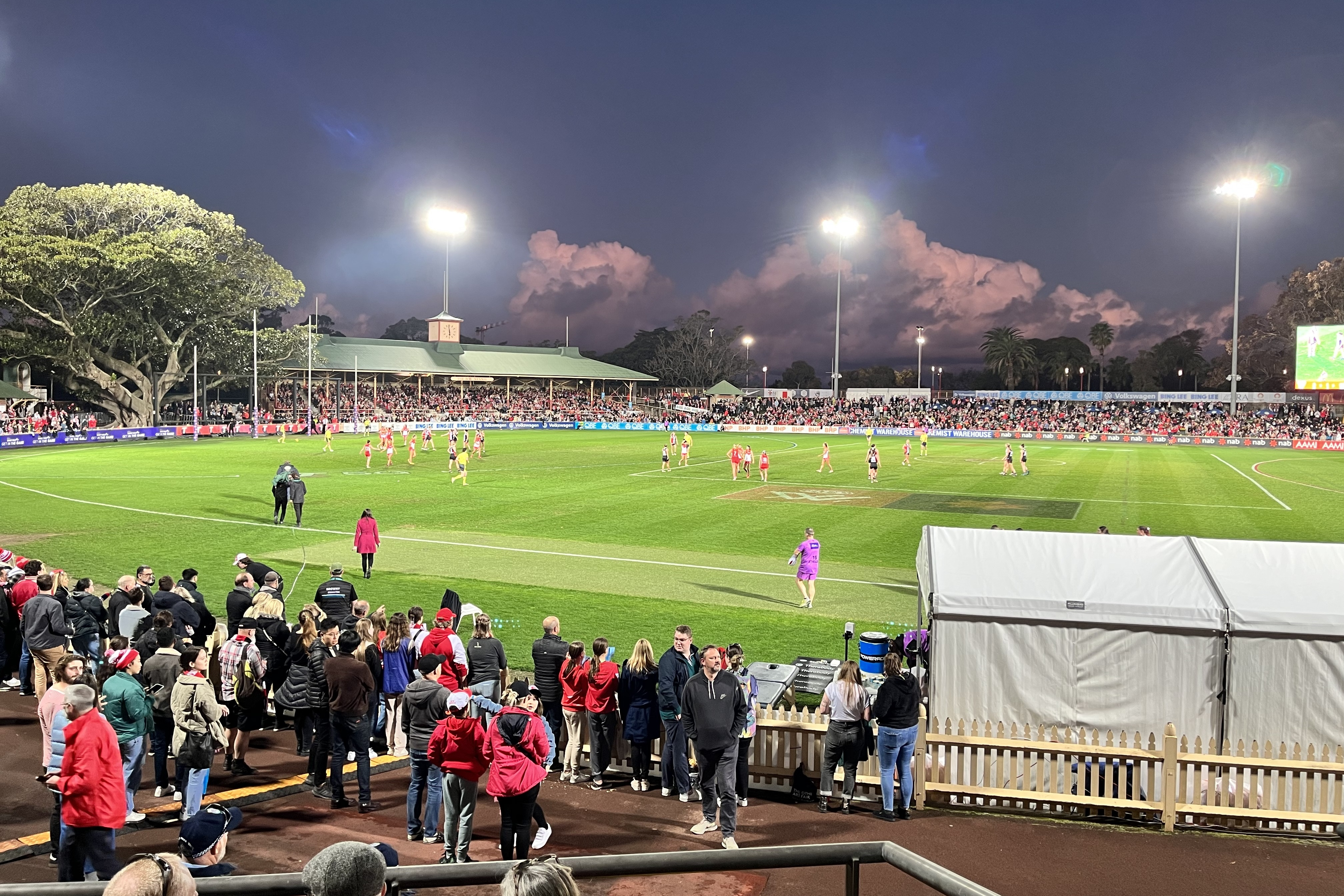
A record breaking AFLW crowd at North Sydney Oval on 27 August 2022

Sydney was awarded a license in 2021 and made its debut in round 1 AFL Women's Season 7 match against St Kilda at the North Sydney Oval. It set a new record for a crowd in a stand-alone women's Australian rules football in New South Wales on 27 August 2022, with 8,264 in attendance. In 2023, the Swans had the highest average home attendance of any club in the league, at 4,637 – over 500 clear of minor premiers Adelaide. This included a season-high attendance of 5,722 for their round nine clash against Collingwood at Henson Park. Also that season, the Swans conjured a remarkable turnaround; after going winless in its inaugural season in 2022, they finished eighth and defeated Gold Coast in its elimination final before losing to Adelaide by 67 points in the semi-final.

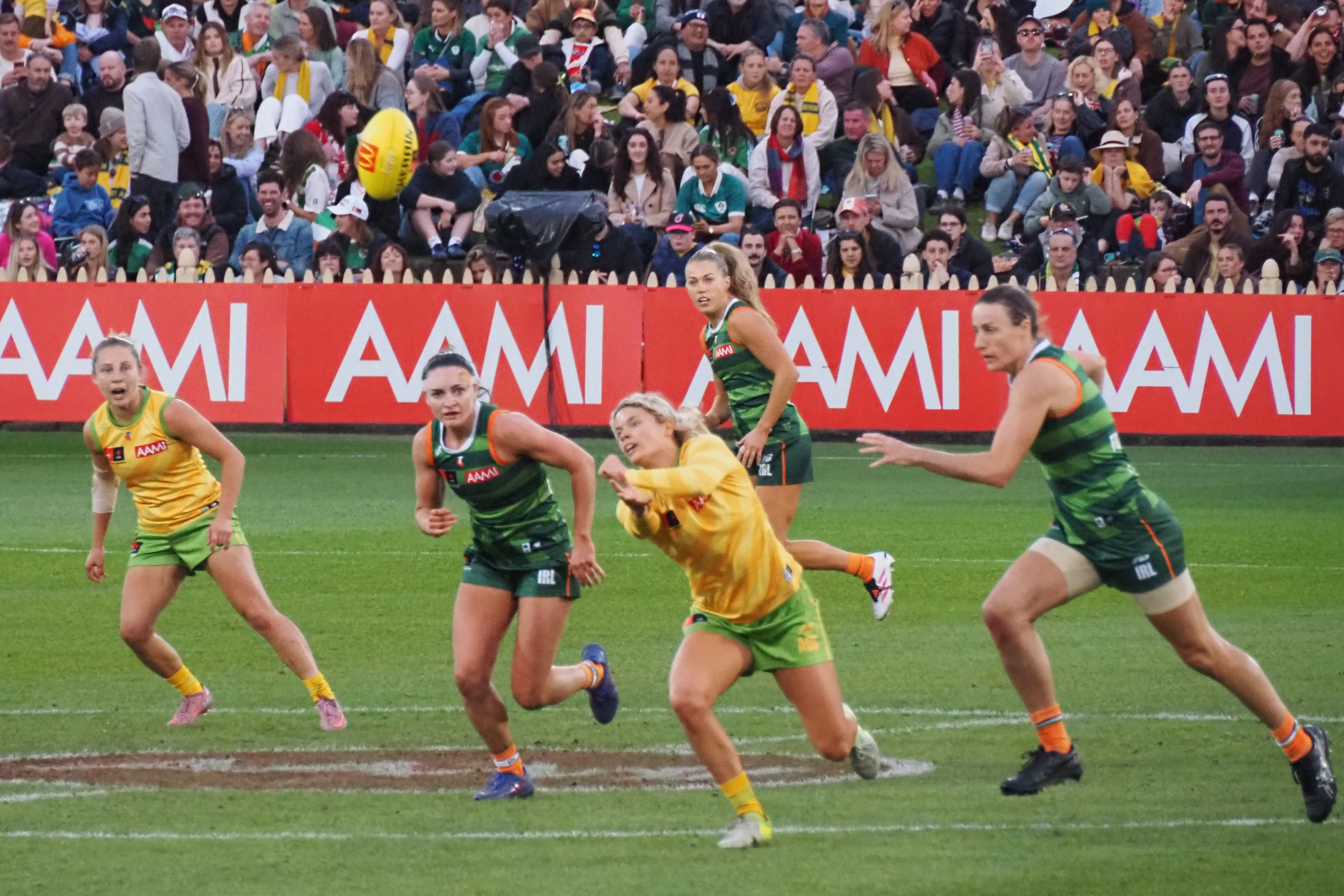
A sold out 2026 AFL Women's Australia v Ireland match set a new women's attendance record.

In 2026, the AFLW chose the North Sydney Oval as the venue for the historic first 2026 AFL Women's Australia v Ireland match which was played in front of a sell-out crowd of 9,017.

== Audiences ==
=== Attendance Record ===
Men's: 72,393 (2003). AFL Sydney Swans v. Collingwood Football Club at Stadium Australia, Sydney. Women's: 9,017 (2026). 2026 AFL Women's Australia v Ireland match at North Sydney Oval

=== Audience trends ===
In 2006, the Sydney Swans averaged 41,205 people through the gate per home match. In 2013, the average had decreased to 29,104, with the suggestion that this was partly due to the redevelopment of the Bradman Stand at the SCG.

Television audience growth has fallen well short of the AFL's predictions for the introduction of the Sydney Swans and GWS Giants. Modest periodic growth has been tightly tied to onfield success of these clubs. This began to change in the 2020s after the COVID Pandemic and 2026 streaming services contributed to modest growth of about 10% in overall home viewership. However NRL's strong growth and dominance in television ratings has overshadowed the AFL's modest growth in the Sydney television market.

== Major Australian rules football events in New South Wales ==
- Sydney Derby, formerly called The Battle of the Bridge – Swans v Giants (held twice annually at ANZ Stadium starting in 2012)

== Competitions ==
=== Club Competitions ===
Location of regional governing bodies and active competitions (yellow is competitions run from other jurisdictions with NSW clubs with points indicating approximate epicentres of NSW clubs)

==== Men's ====
Active competition

| League | Years with NSW clubs | Senior NSW clubs | Divisions | Headquarters | Notes |
|---|---|---|---|---|---|
| New South Wales Football Association | 1880–1893 | 19 | 1 | Sydney | Folded |
| Newcastle Australian Football League | 1886–1999 | 21 | 1 | Newcastle | Merged with Central Coast Australian Football League in 1999 |
| Wagga Football Association | 1888–1889 | | | Wagga Wagga | Folded |
| Broken Hill Football League | 1890– | 4 | 1 | Broken Hill | Affiliated with the South Australian Football Commission. Current clubs date to 1900 |
| Murray Border Football Association | 1895–1902 | 6 | 1 | Barooga | Also known as the Federal Football Association |
| Ovens & Murray Football Netball League | 1896– | 4 | 1 | Rutherglen, Victoria | Albury was the league's first NSW club followed by South Albury and Corowa by 1898 |
| Wagga United Football Association | 1897 | | | Wagga Wagga | Folded |
| Murrumbidgee District Football Association | 1897 | | | | Folded |
| Federal District Football Association | 1897–1902 | 3 | 1 | Cobram, Victoria | Folded |
| Wagga United Football Association | 1898–1921 | | | Wagga Wagga | Folded |
| Deniliquin Football Association | 1900–1932 | 13 | 1 | Deniliquin | Folded |
| McLaurin Football Competition | 1901 | | | | Folded |
| AFL Sydney | 1903– | 22 | 7 | Sydney | |
| Southern Riverina Football Association | 1905–1931 | 3 | 1 | Berrigan | Folded |
| Greengunyah Football Association | 1906 | | | | Folded |
| Corowa & District Football Association | 1906–1907 | | | Corowa | Folded |
| Central Riverina Football League | 1907 | 3 | 1 | Narrandera | Folded |
| Coreen & District Football League | 1909–2007 | 7 | 1 | Coreen | Folded |
| Ganmain Football Association | 1910–1913 | 7 | 1 | Ganmain | Folded, all clubs moved to the South West District league in 1913 |
| South West Football League | 1910–1981 | 14 | 1 | Riverina | Absorbed into Riverina District Football League / Farrer Football League two division system |
| Faithful & District Football Association | 1920–1940 | 10 | 1 | Kywong | Folded |
| Riverina Main Line Football Association | 1922 | 7 | 1 | Wagga Wagga | Folded |
| Riverina Football Association | 1924–1929 | 7 | 1 | Wagga Wagga | Folded |
| Northern Riverina Football League | 1924– | 5 | 1 | Tullibigeal | |
| AFL Canberra | 1925– | 6 | 4 | Canberra | Queanbeyan and more recently from surrounding towns Cooma, Yass, Cootamundra, Batemans Bay and Murrumbateman |
| Central Hume Football Association | 1928–1935 | 19 | 1 | | Folded |
| Central Riverina Football League | 1930–1957 | 25 | 1 | | Folded |
| Murray Football Netball League | 1932– | 5 | 1 | Shepparton, Victoria | |
| Hume Football Netball League | 1933– | 12 | 1 | Walla Walla | |
| Albury & District Football League | 1941–1981 | 19 | 1 | Albury | Folded |
| Sunraysia Football and Netball League | 1942– | 1 | 1 | Mildura, Victoria | |
| Golden Rivers Football League | 1945– | 3 | 1 | Kerang, Victoria | |
| Milbrulong & District Football League | 1945–1948 | 9 | 1 | Milbrulong | Folded |
| Farrer Football League | 1957– | 9 | 1 | Wagga Wagga | |
| New England Australian Football League | 1962–1984 | 7 | 1 | Armidale | Folded |
| AFL South Coast Seniors | 1969– | 10 | 1 | Wollongong | |
| Picola & District Football Netball League | 1969– | 7 | 1 | Picola, Victoria | |
| North West Australian Football League | 1970s–1993 | 7 | 1 | Tamworth | Folded |
| Upper Murray Football Netball League | 1971– | 1 | 1 | Corryong, Victoria | |
| Illawarra Australian Football League | 1975–1988 | 6 | 1 | Wollongong | Folded |
| Central Coast Australian Football League | 1976–1999 | 8 | 1 | Central Coast | Merged with Newcastle Australian Football League in 1999 |
| Millewa Football League | 1980– | 1 | 1 | Mildura, Victoria | |
| Riverina Football Netball League | 1982– | 9 | 1 | Wagga Wagga | |
| AFL North Coast | 1982– | 5 | 1 | Coffs Harbour | |
| AFL Central West | 1982– | 6 | 2 | Bathurst | |
| VFL/AFL | 1983– | 2 | 1 | Melbourne, Victoria | |
| Australian Football Championships night series | 1983–1986 | 1 | 1 | Melbourne, Victoria | Discontinued |
| Summerland Australian Football League | 1984–2021 | 11 | 1 | Ballina | Taken over by AFL Queensland as QFA Northern Rivers in 2011 before folding in 2021 |
| AFL Sapphire Coast | 1984– | 4 | 1 | Tilba | |
| Tallangatta & District Football League | 1988– | 1 | 1 | Tallangatta, Victoria | |
| AFL North West NSW | 1997– | 4 | 1 | Coffs Harbour | |
| Central Murray Football Netball League | 1997– | 3 | 1 | Swan Hill, Victoria | |
| AFL Hunter Central Coast Seniors | 2000– | 15 | 1 | Newcastle | |
| Queensland Football Association | 2009– | 2 | 1 | Brisbane, Queensland | Tweed Coast (Bogangar), Southern Stingrays (Ballina) |
| North East Australian Football League | 2011–2020 | 4 | 1 | Sydney | Amalgamated with the Victorian Football League in 2021 |
| League Championship Cup | 2011–2013 | 3 | 1 | Melbourne, Victoria | Discontinued |
| AFLQ Northern Rivers | 2014–2021 | 4 | 1 | Byron Bay | Run by AFL Queensland. Folded |
| Victorian Football League | 2020– | 2 | 1 | Melbourne, Victoria | |

==== Women's ====
Active competition

| League | Years with NSW clubs | NSW clubs | Divisions | Headquarters | Notes |
|---|---|---|---|---|---|
| AFL Sydney Women's Premiership Division | 1999– | 9 | 1 | Sydney | |
| Southern NSW Women's League | 2018– | 8 | 1 | Wagga Wagga | |
| AFL South Coast Women's Premier Division | 2018– | 6 | 1 | Wollongong | |

==== Junior ====
Active competition

| League | Years with NSW clubs | Divisions | NSW clubs | Headquarters | Notes |
|---|---|---|---|---|---|
| AFL Sydney Juniors | 2016– | Mixed: U8-U14; M: U8-U17; F: U9-U17 | 50 | Sydney | |
| Sydney Independent Schools Competition | 2016– | M: U12-U18; F: U10-U18 | 68 | Sydney | |
| Talent League | 2019– | Mixed: U19; M: U16-U18; F: U16-18 | 2 | Melbourne | |

== Representative teams ==
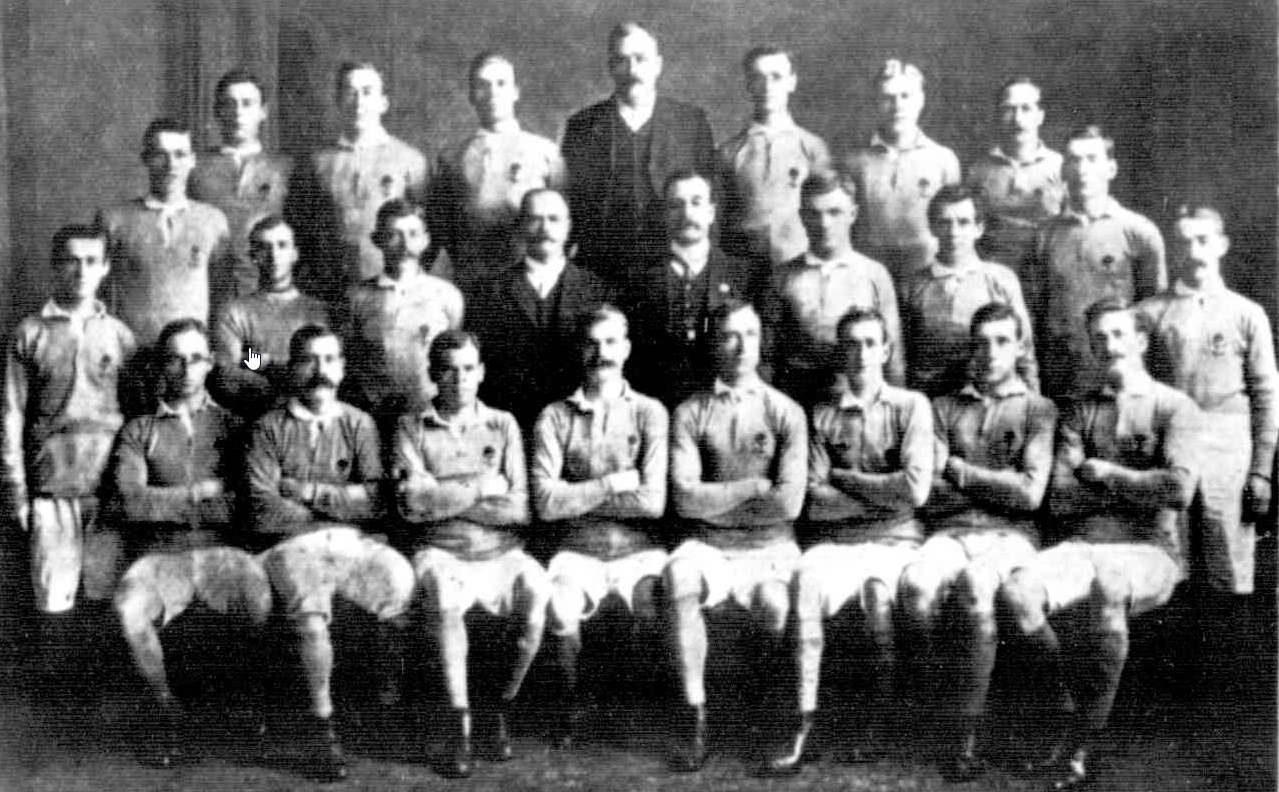
New South Wales team, 1908

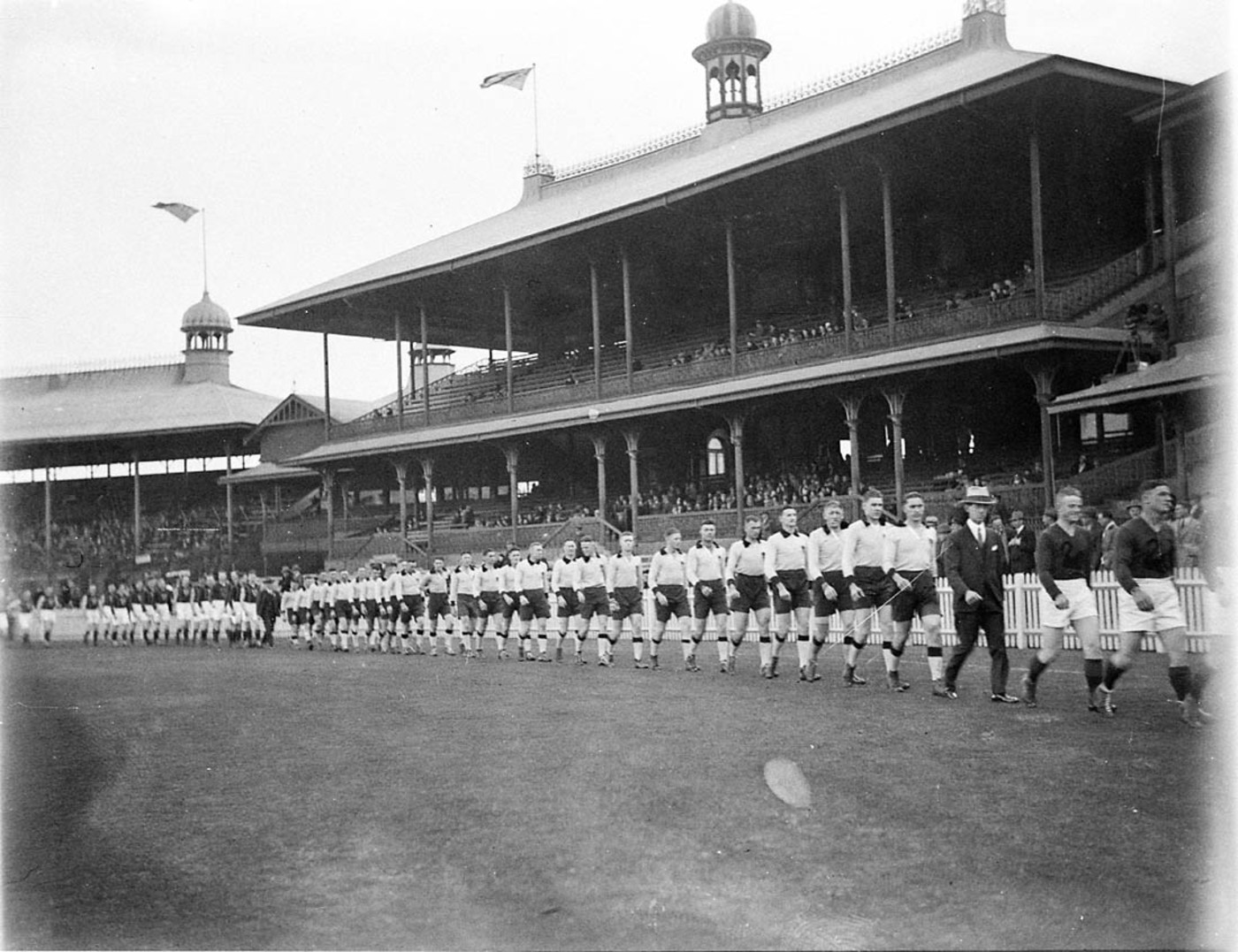
Parade of the New South Wales team, 1933 Sydney Carnival

The New South Wales representative team, nicknamed the Blues, played Interstate matches against other Australian states and Territories. The team wore a blue uniform with a Waratah symbol badge and, until the 1970s, was the only representative team to buck the trend of sleeveless guernseys to fit with the fashions in rugby. The Blues defeated the Victoria team in 1923 and again in 1990 under State of Origin rules at the Sydney Cricket Ground. Its final appearance was at the 1988 Adelaide Bicentennial Carnival on 5 March 1988, where it defeated Western Australia at Football Park.

In 1993, the game's new governing body, the AFL Commission, created a composite team with the Australian Capital Territory, the NSW/ACT Rams, to contest the 1993 State of Origin Championships. Captained by Wayne Carey, all but four of the players were from New South Wales. Unlike the standalone team, the combined team did not experience any success, and the state has not fielded a standalone senior men's team since.

NSW was an inaugural participant in the National underage titles. It competed from 1993 to 2016 as NSW/ACT, after which it was dropped from the national championships and instead competed in the TAC Cup (now Talent League).

=== Uniforms ===
| New South Wales | NSW/ACT |

=== Senior Men's Captains ===
==== NSWAFL Era ====
| Name | Years as captain |
|---|---|
| Ralph Robertson | 1908, 1911, 1914 |
| Reg Ellis | 1924 |
| Arthur Gloster | 1927 |
| Dave Elliman | 1930 |
| Alan Smythe | 1947 |
| Alf Penno | 1958 |

==== State of Origin Era ====
| Laurie Pendrick | 1979 |
| Terry Daniher | 1988 |
| Wayne Carey | 1993* |

- as NSW/ACT

== Players ==
=== Participation ===
According to Ausplay the participation rate is 1.2%, with 80,572 players in 2024 up from 71,481 participants in 2023. Although it is one of the fastest growing sports in the state, the overall participation per capita is around one percent, the lowest for the sport in Australia. Prior to official Ausplay data, the AFL reported significantly higher participation numbers, reaching a peak of 177,949 in 2013 however these figures were inflated due to the inclusion of players from the ACT and participants in Auskick sessions (as many as 50,000) which could not be classified as regular players. Nevertheless, the code has grown substantially and it now has many more participants than rugby union, but trails behind soccer and rugby league.

The Australian Bureau of Statistics "Children's Participation in Cultural and Leisure Activities, Australia, Apr 2009" estimated that there were only 18,000 Australian rules football participants however the ABS used a small sample size of 20,126 private dwelling in obtaining their data of participation numbers for the 2011/12 season.

Registered players
| 2007 | 2011 | 2016 | 2019 | 2022/23 | 2023/24 |
|---|---|---|---|---|---|
| 7,225 | 18,000 | 51,177 | 69,168 | 71,481 | 80,572 |

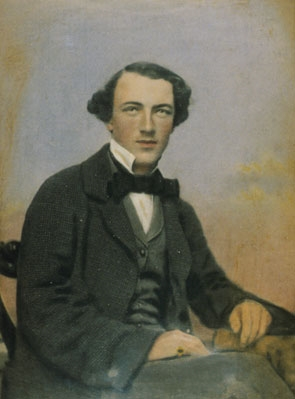
Australian football pioneer Tom Wills was born and raised at Burra

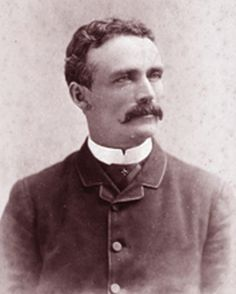
H. C. A. Harrison, the "Father of Australian Football" was born in Picton

=== Past greats and Hall of Famers ===
A number of notable players have been born in New South Wales or played the majority of their junior careers in New South Wales; many of these players have been from the traditional Australian rules football areas of Broken Hill or the Riverina. Australian football pioneers Tom Wills and H. C. A. Harrison were born in New South Wales in the 1830s.

Notable players from the Riverina include: Australian Football Hall of Fame Legend Haydn Bunton, Sr. (Albury), who was the first player born in New South Wales to win the Brownlow Medal and the Sandover Medal, in 1931 and 1938, respectively; Bill Mohr of Wagga, who kicked 735 league goals; the Daniher family from West Wyalong, particularly Terry Daniher and Anthony Daniher but also Neale and Chris, who all played at Essendon for much of their career and represented the state on multiple occasions and are the first and only brotherly quartet to play a VFL/AFL game together; Paul Kelly from Wagga, the first New South Welshman to win the Brownlow (1995); Shane Crawford (Finley), who won the Brownlow in 1999; and Wayne Carey (Wagga), who won the Leigh Matthews Trophy twice in the 1990s. .

Players from Broken Hill include Roy Bent, Steve Hywood (one of the best back flankers ever to play the game), Dean Solomon, Brent Staker, and Taylor Walker. Others from there include Dave Low, Robert Barnes and Bruce McGregor, who all won Magarey Medals in the 1910s and 1920s, and Jack Owens, a three-time South Australian National Football League (SANFL) leading goalkicker

Many notable players have also been recruited from Sydney, with Australian rules being played since 1880 and pre-dating other major sports. Despite the lack of media attention the game has received, Sydney has still generated many players of high quality. Notable Sydneysiders have included: Bob Merrick (a leading goal kicker in the 1920s recruited from East Sydney), Roger Duffy (1954 premiership player who was recruited from Newtown), Mark Maclure (multi-premiership player and Carlton FC captain), Michael Byrne (1983 premiership player with Hawthorn who was recruited from the Sydney club of North Shore), Mark Roberts (202-game AFL player from 1985 to 1999 who played junior football for Ramsgate AFC and senior football for St. George AFC before playing in the AFL for the Sydney Swans), Brisbane Bears, and North Melbourne, notably in their 1996 premiership, Greg Stafford (a 200-game player recruited from Western Suburbs in Sydney), Jarrad McVeigh (2012 AFL premiership captain) and his brother Mark (who played for Essendon), Lewis Roberts-Thomson (2005 and 2012 premiership player for the Swans) and Lenny Hayes (2010 Norm Smith Medallist), amongst others.

Some notable players made their name in leagues outside of Victoria include Lithgow born and Sydney raised West Australian Football Hall of Famer William "Nipper" Truscott, South Australian Football Hall of Famer Geoff Kingston and Balmain and Port Adelaide's Jack Ashley and West Torrens Dave Low.

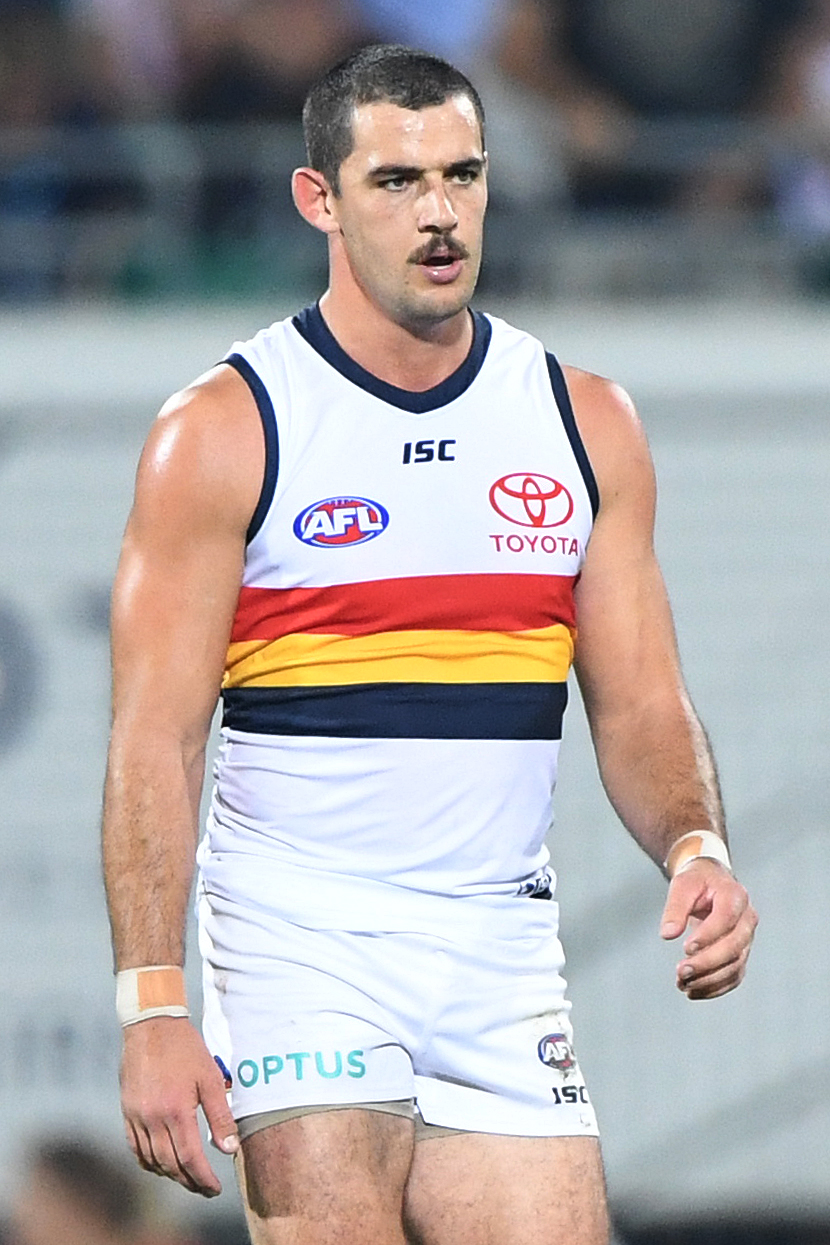
Taylor Walker, former Adelaide captain is from Broken Hill

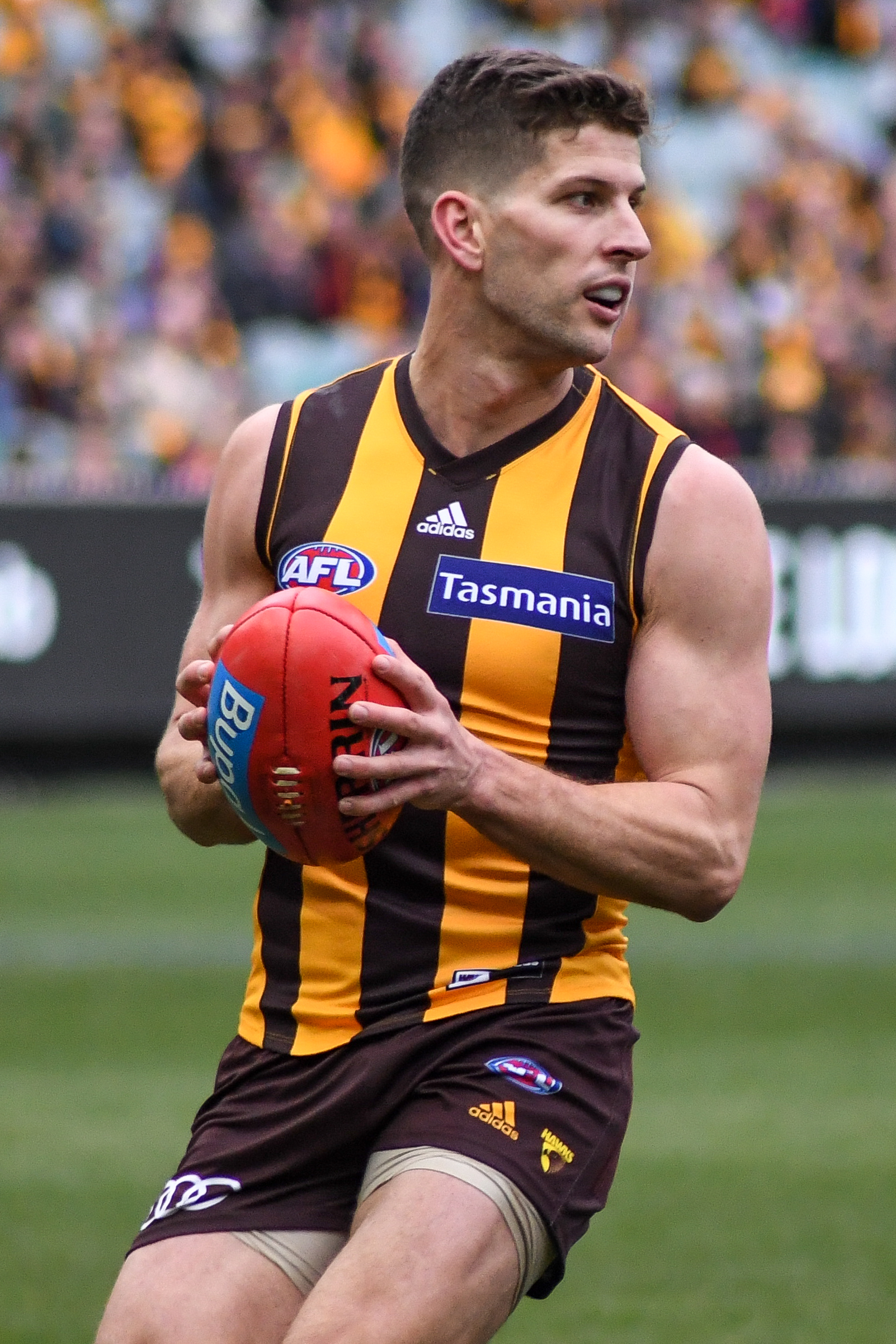
Luke Breust, triple premiership player is from Temora

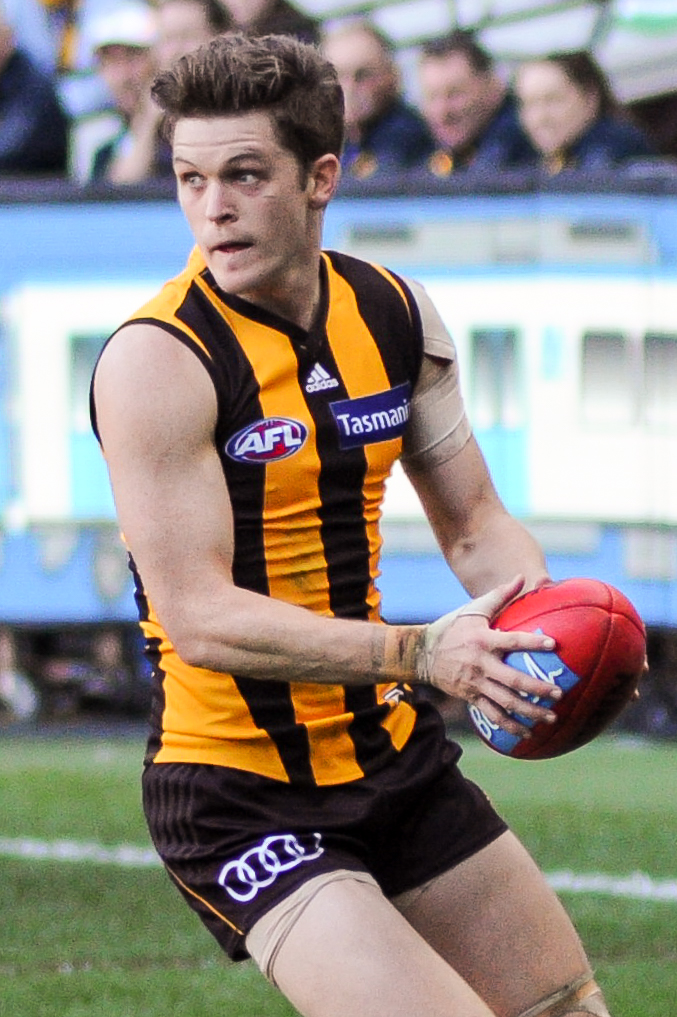
Taylor Duryea, double premiership player is from Corowa

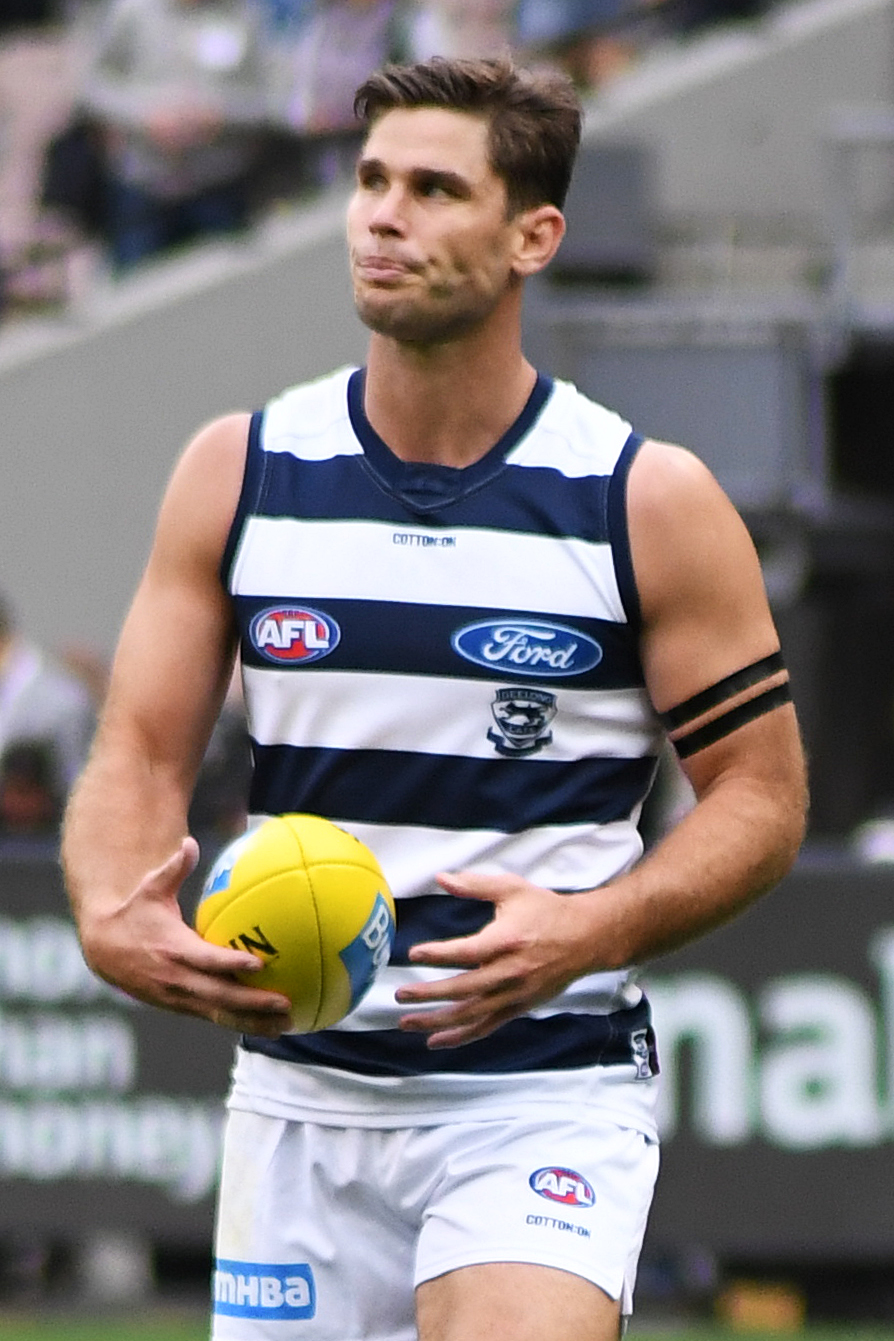
Tom Hawkins, triple premiership player is from Finley

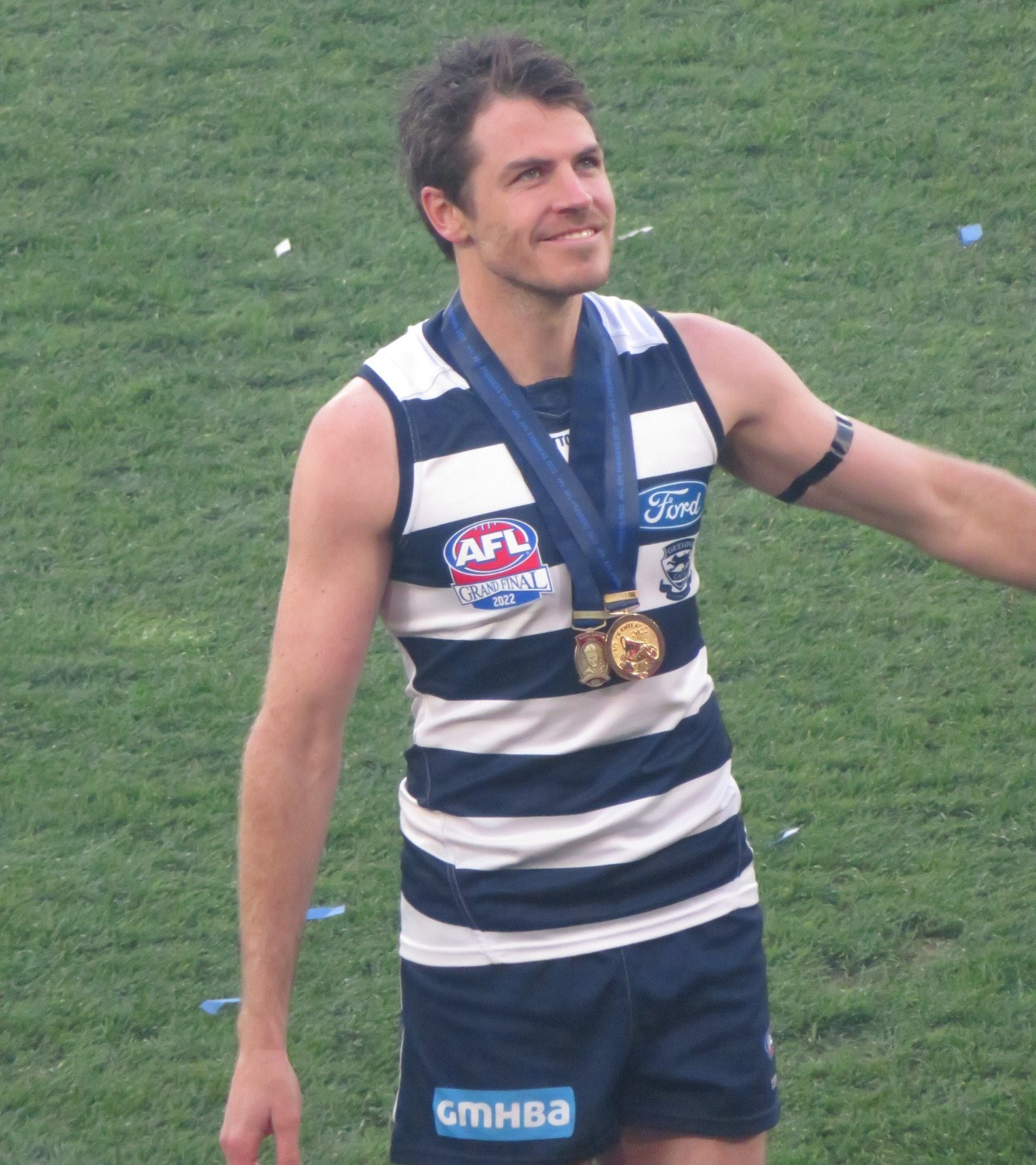
Isaac Smith, 4 time premiership player is from Cootamundra and Wagga

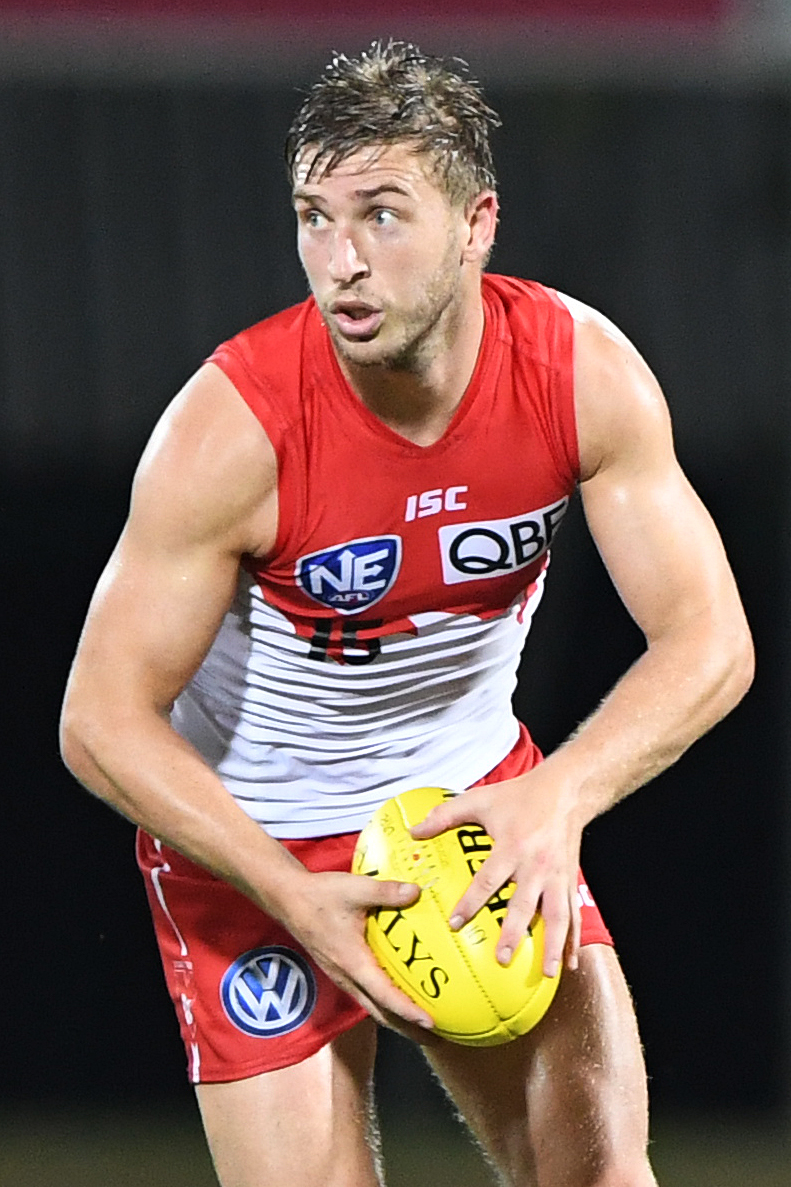
Keiren Jack, premiership player and former Sydney Swans captain is from Sydney.

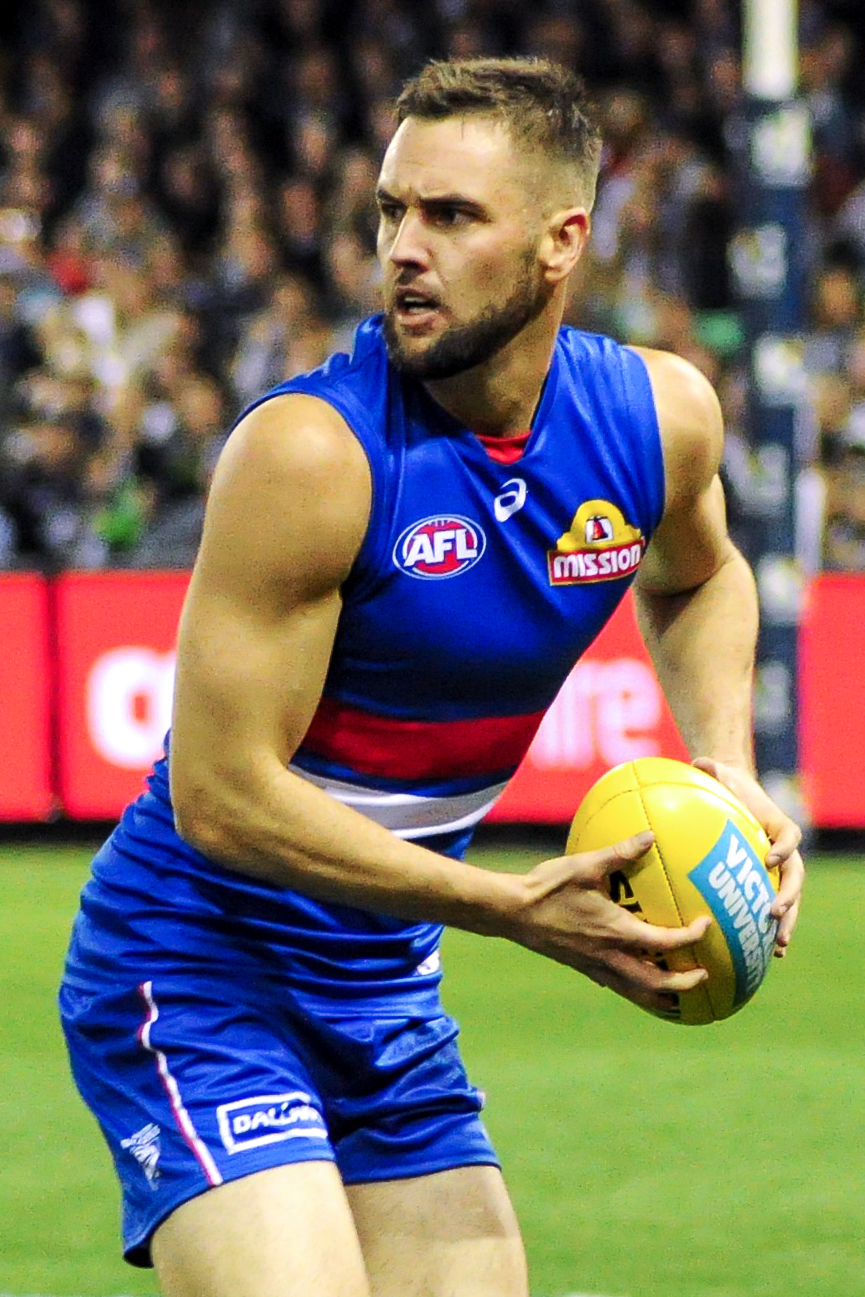
Matt Suckling, premiership player, is from Wagga

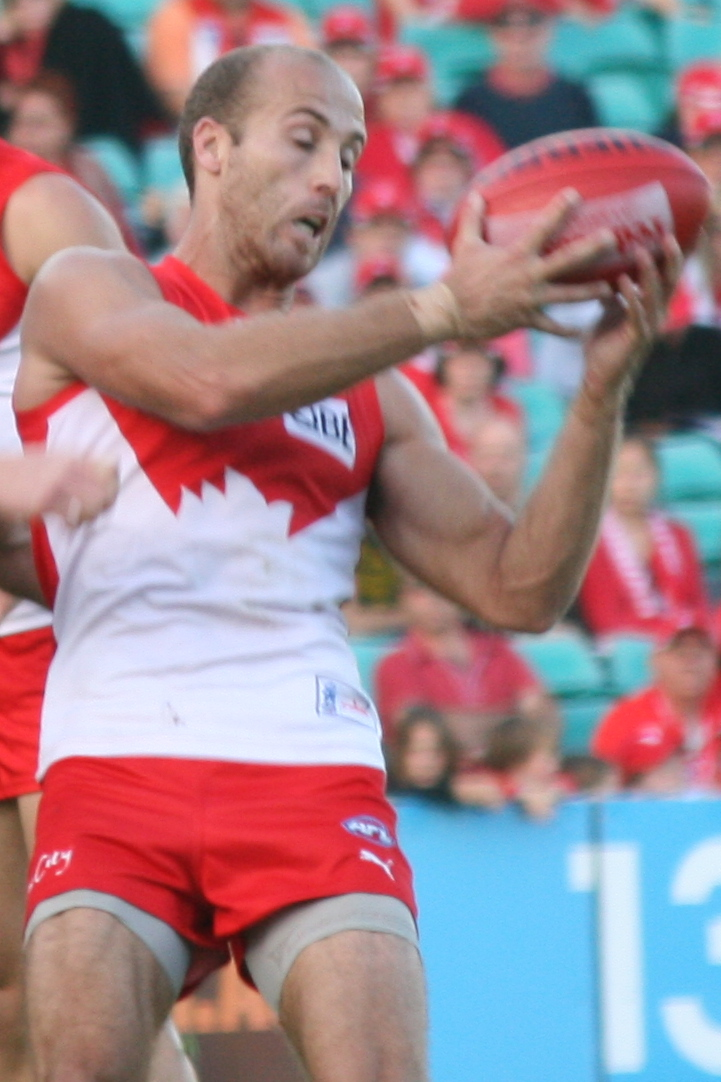
Jarrad McVeigh Sydney Swans premiership captain is from the Central Coast

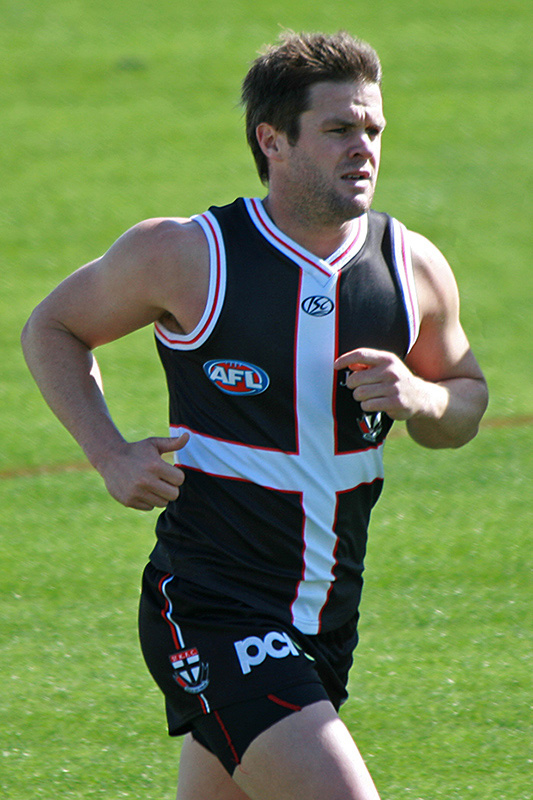
Adam Schneider Sydney premiership player is from Osborne

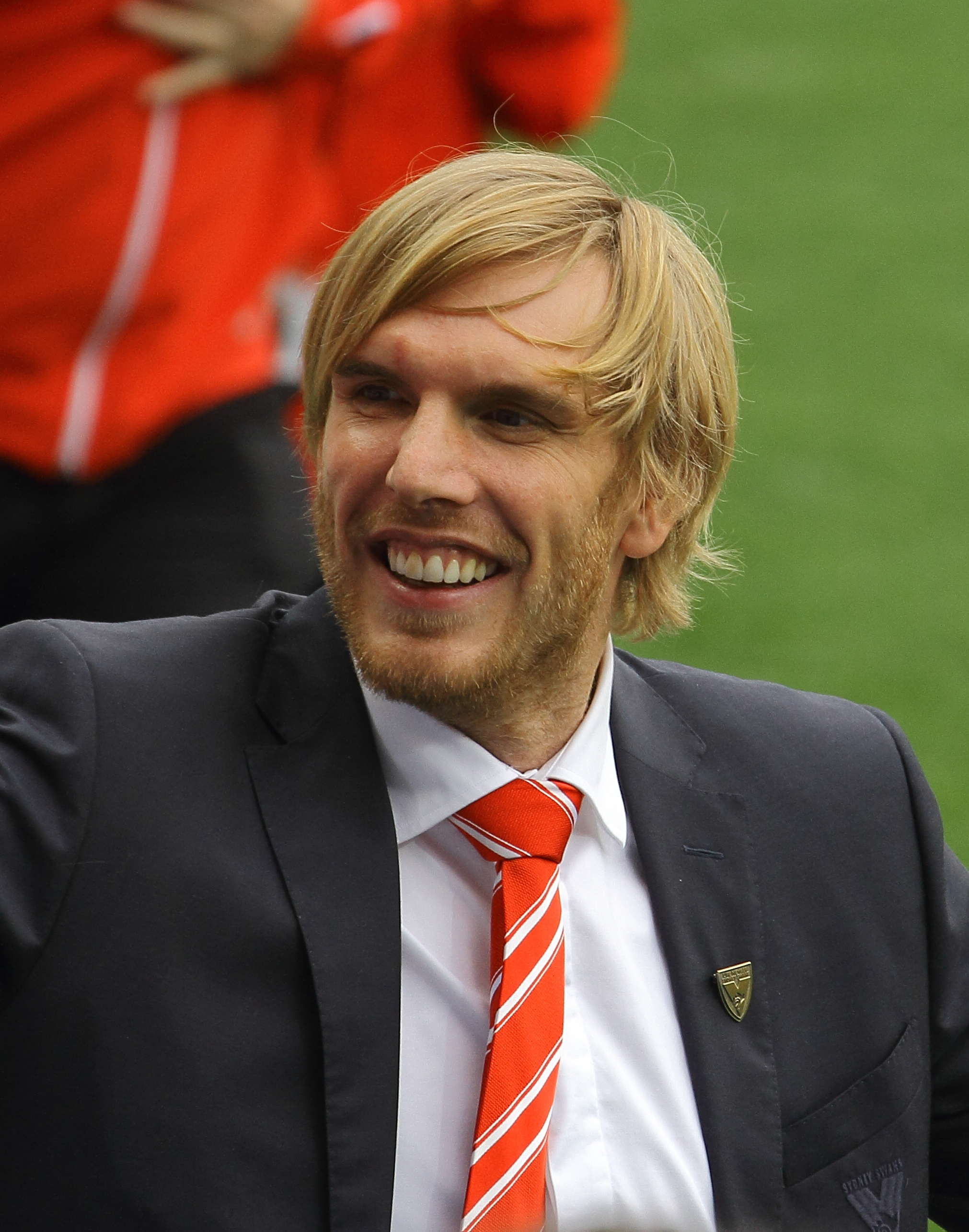
Lewis Roberts-Thompson Sydney Swans premiership player is from Sydney

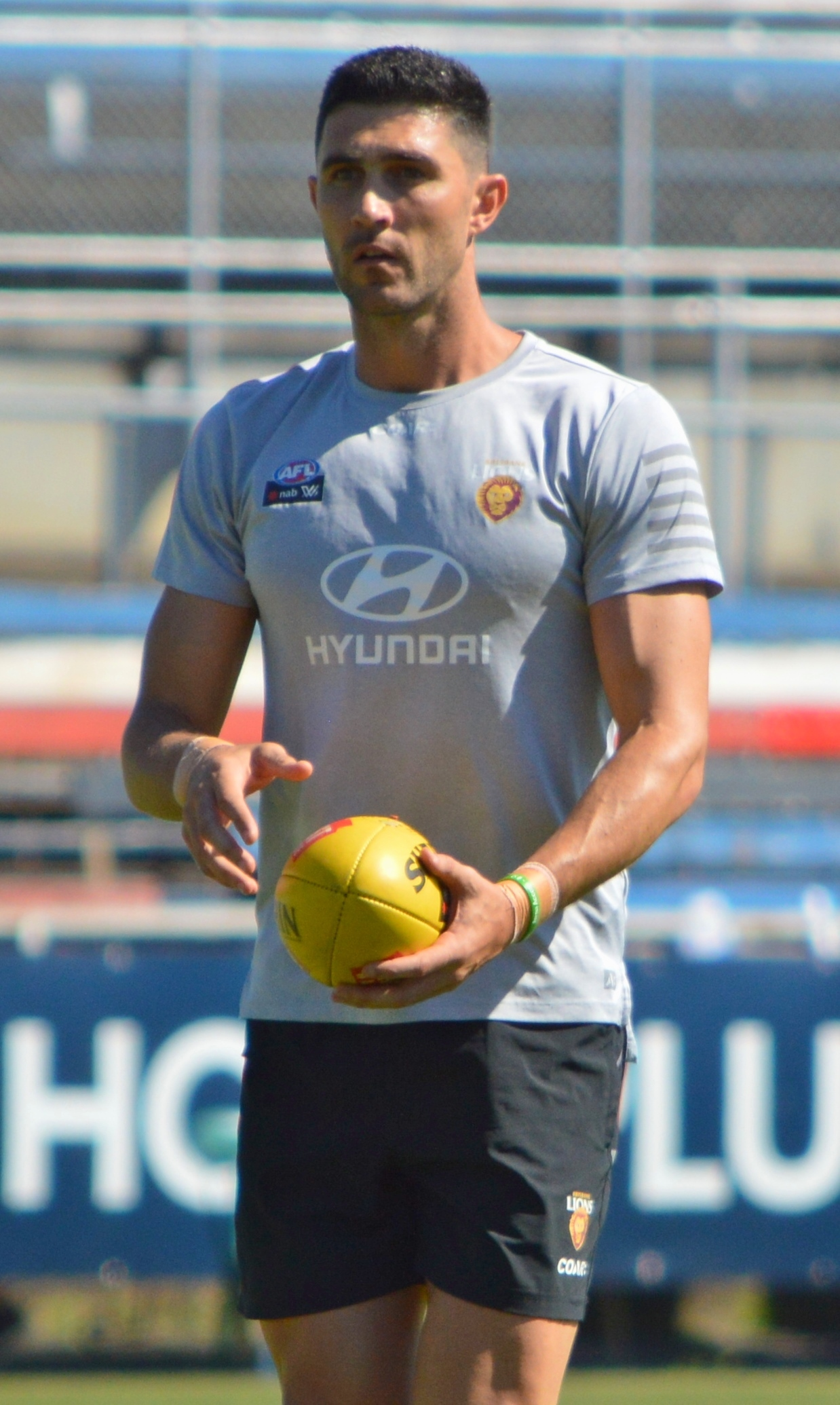
Brent Staker played more than 150 AFL games, from Broken Hill

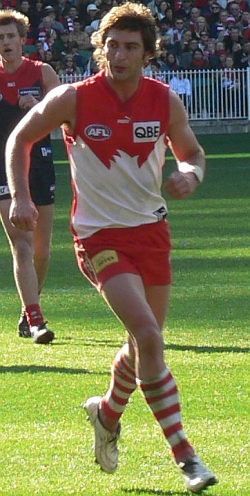
Brett Kirk, Sydney Swans premiership player and coach is from Albury

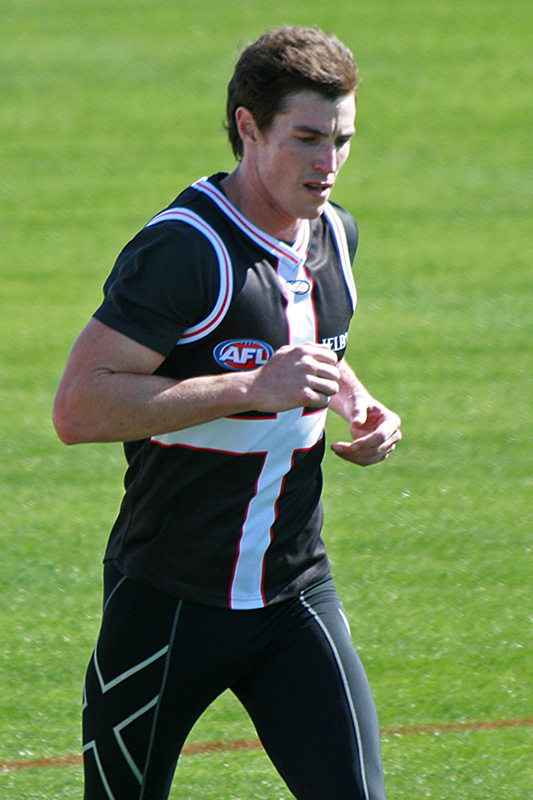
Lenny Hayes AFL Hall of Famer is from Sydney

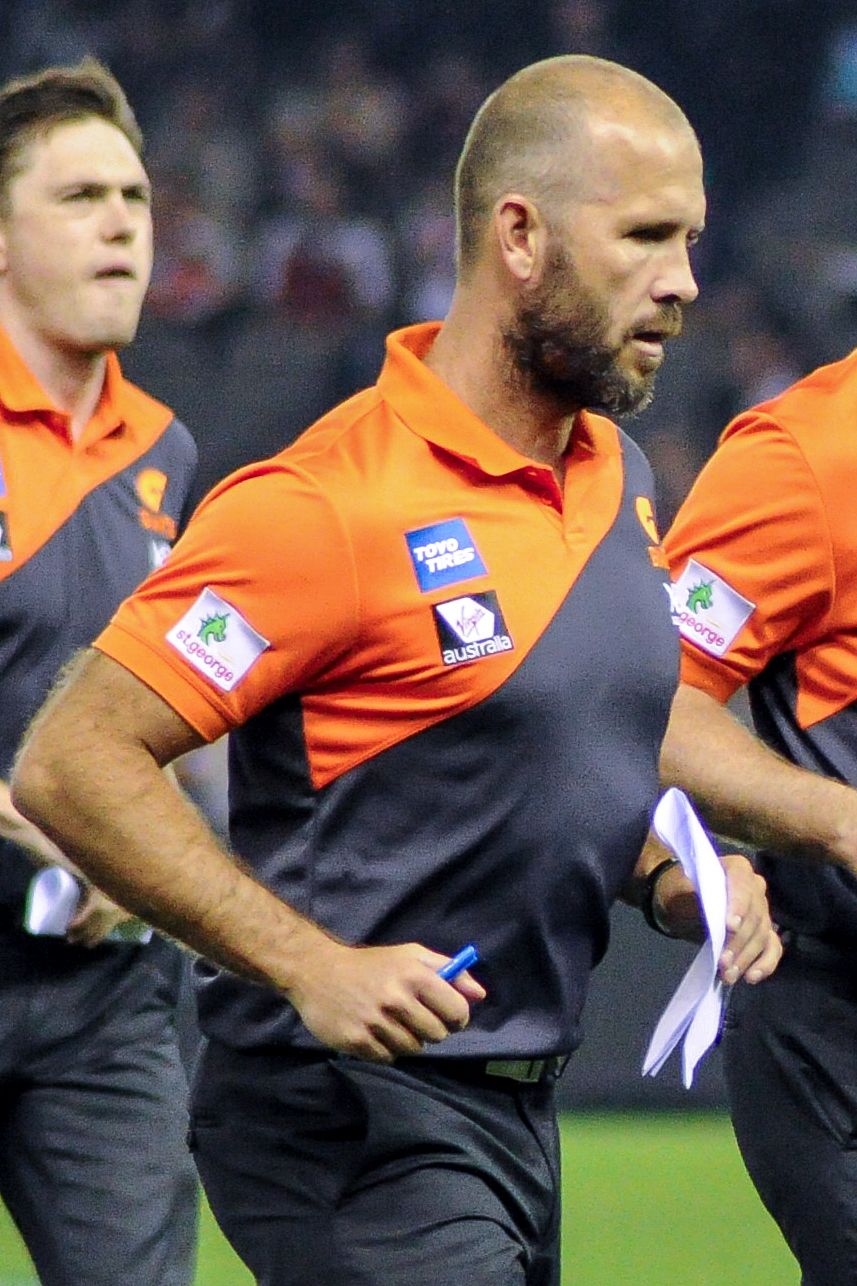
Mark McVeigh, 232 AFL gamer is from the Central Coast

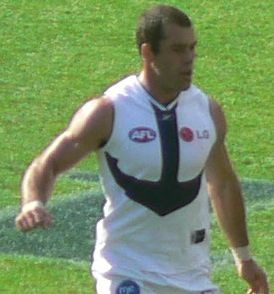
Dean Solomon, premiership player is from Broken Hill

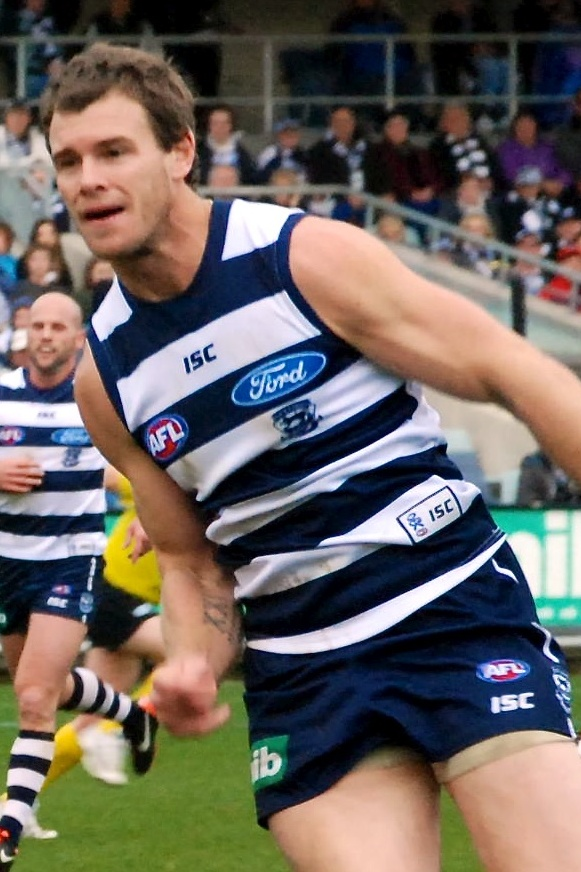
Cameron Mooney 3 time premiership player is from Wagga Wagga

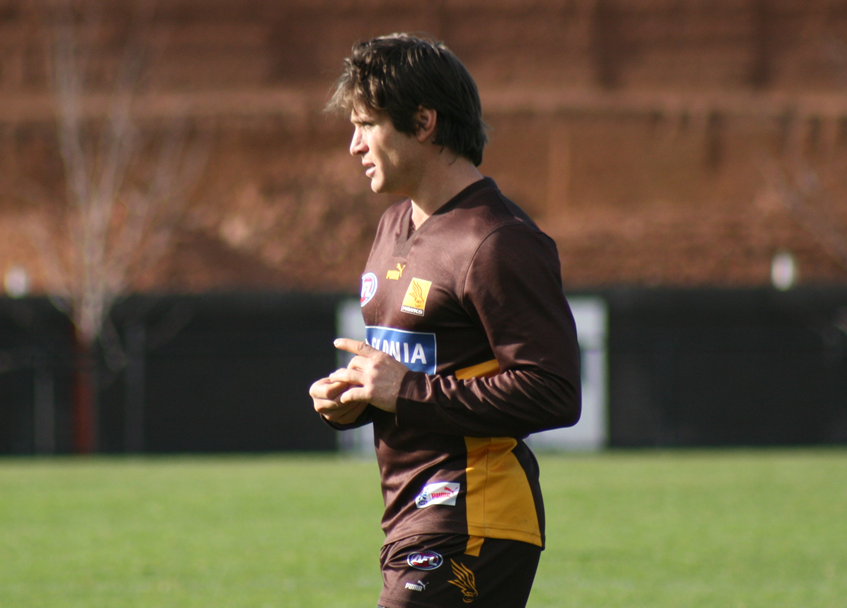
Shane Crawford Brownlow medallist and premiership player is from Finley

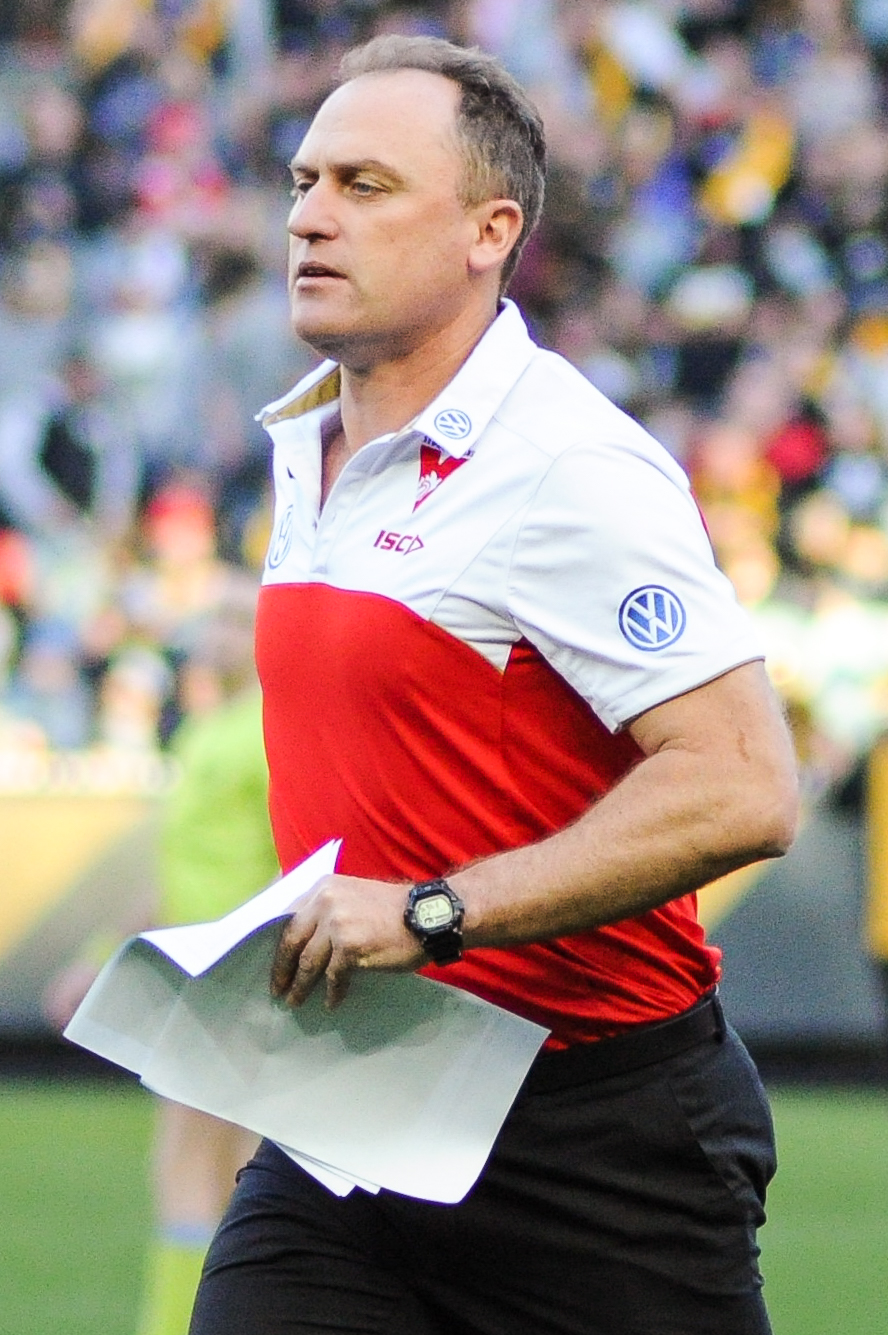
John Longmire premiership player and coach is from Corowa

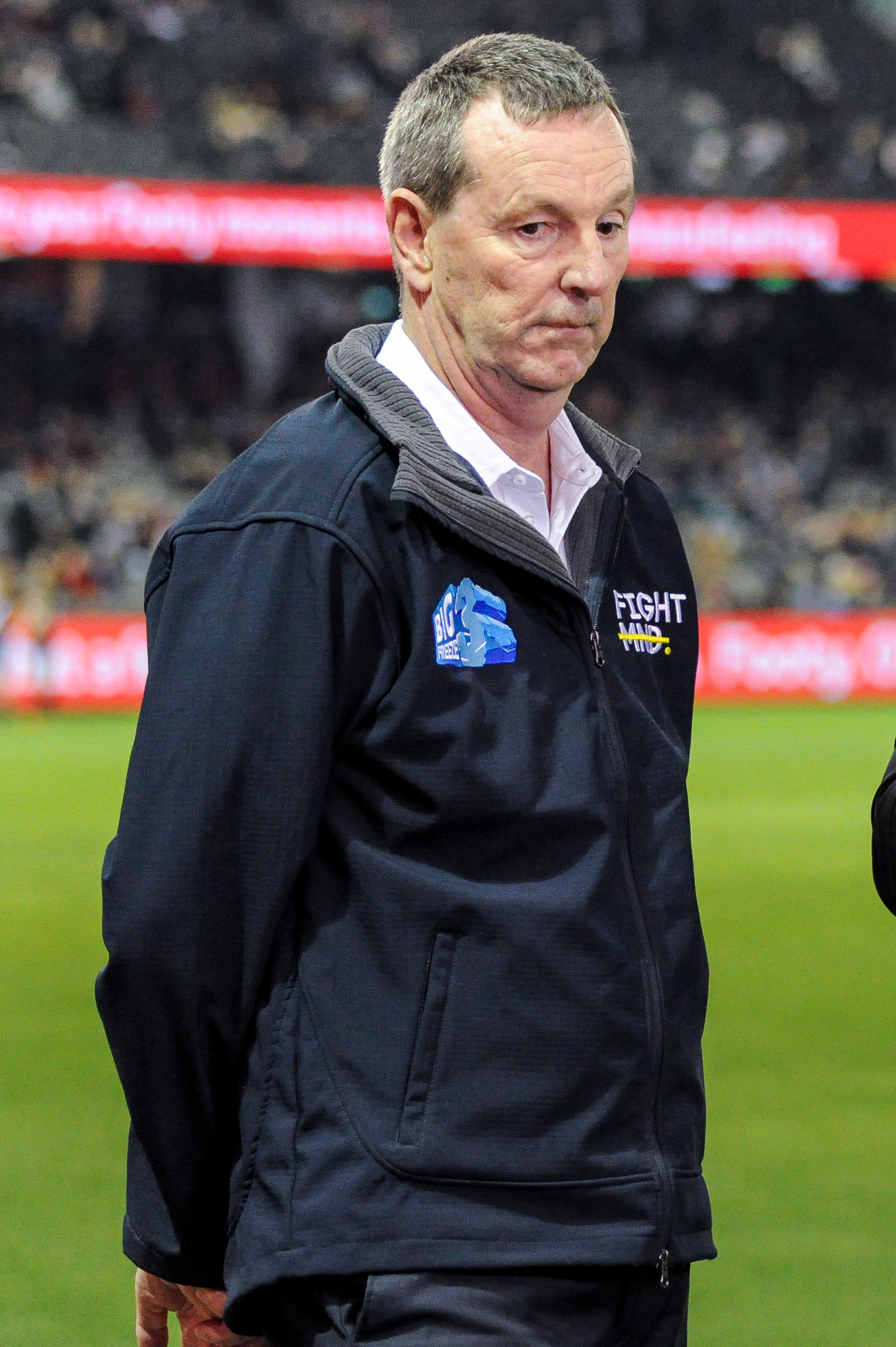
Neale Daniher is from West Wyalong

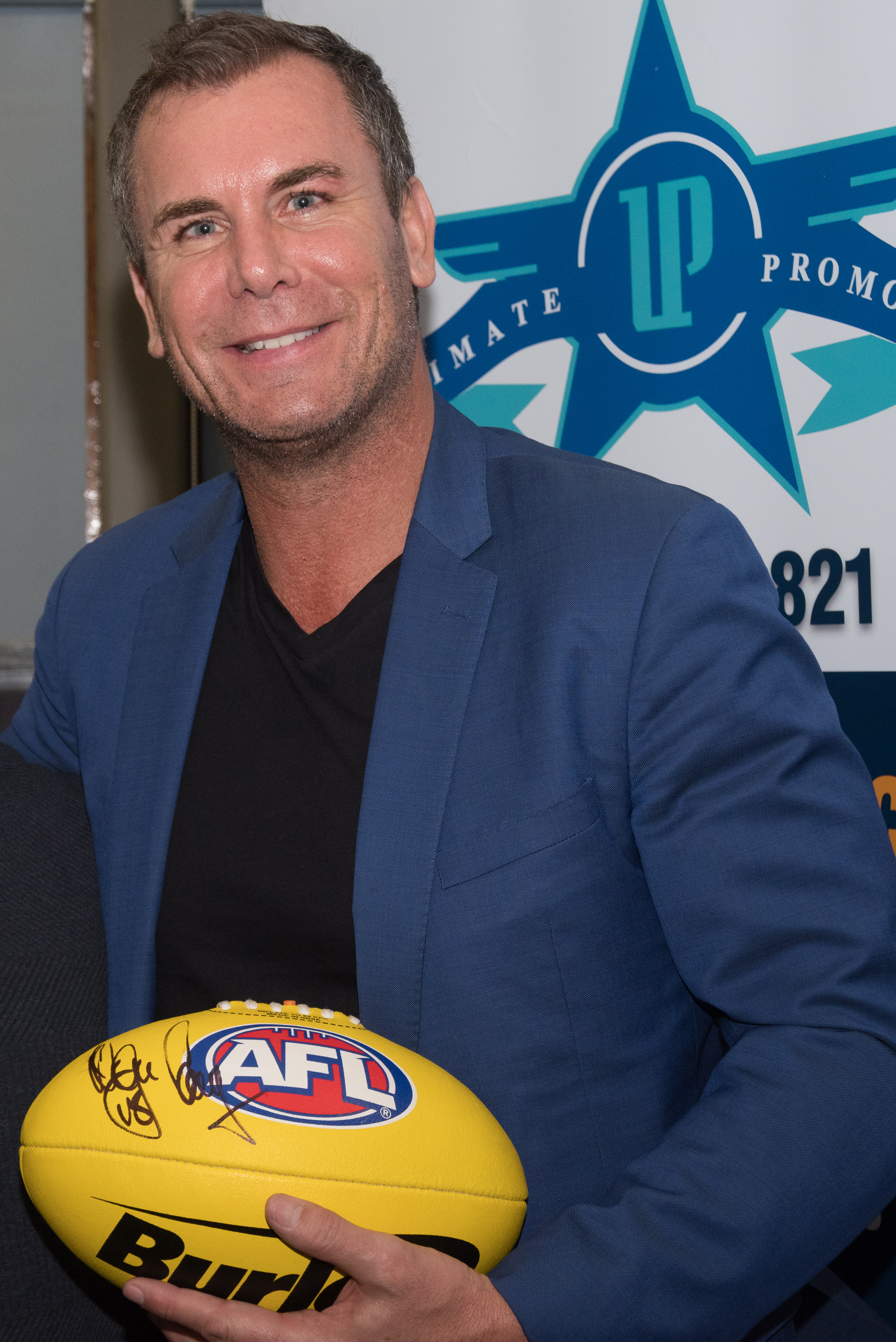
Wayne Carey 2 time premiership captain is from Wagga

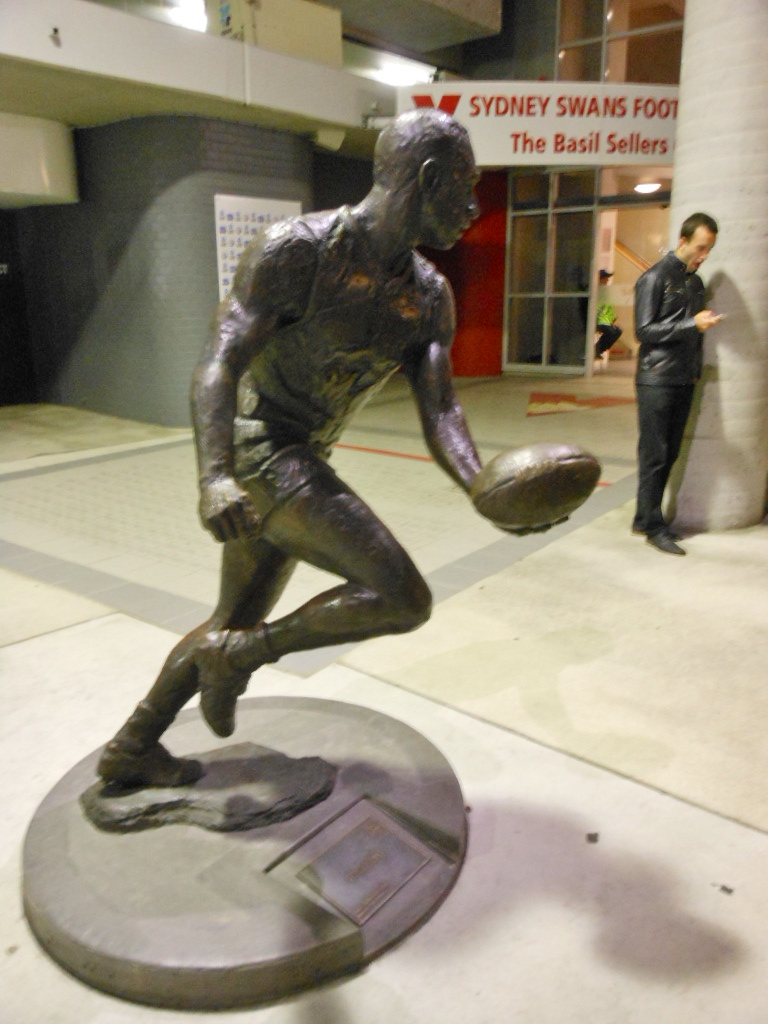
Statue of Paul Kelly, Brownlow Medallist Sydney Swans captain and rugby league convert was from Wagga

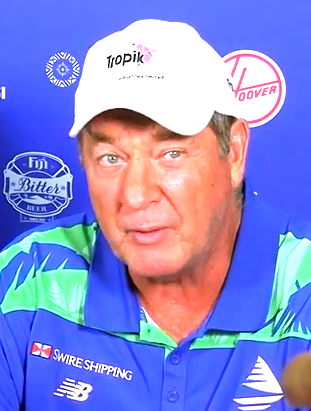
Mick Byrne is from Sydney

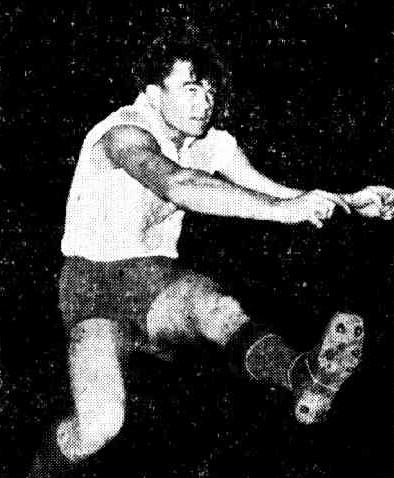
Roger Duffy in 1952, premiership player is from Sydney

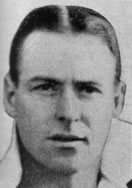
Bill Mohr of Wagga kicked 735 league goals

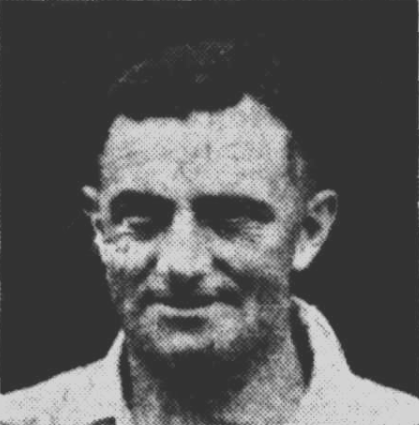
Reg Ellis in 1932 was from Randwick in Sydney

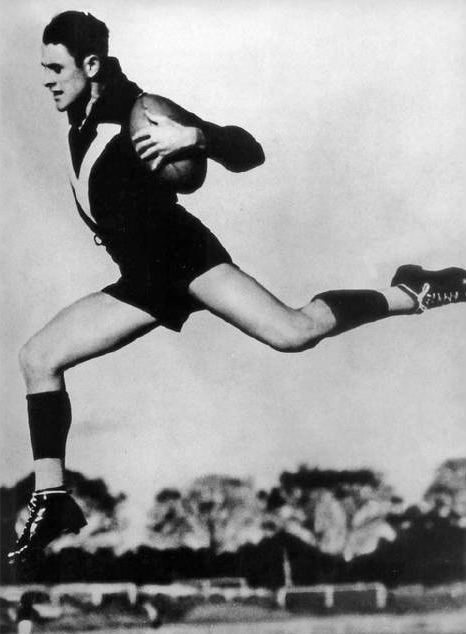
Haydn Bunton Sr. in the 1930s was from Albury

Bruce McGregor in 1927 was from Broken Hill

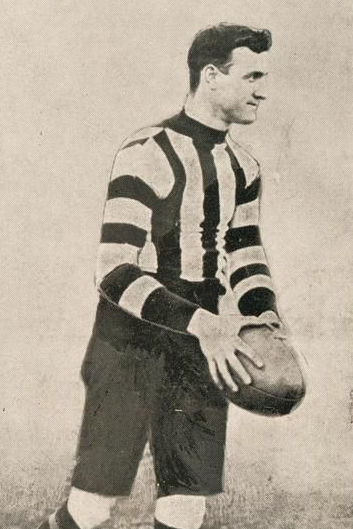
Jock McHale in 1910 was from Sydney

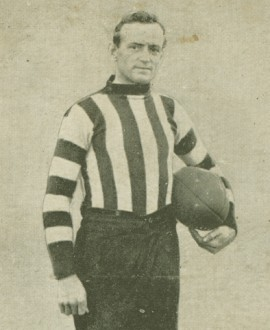
Marshall Herbert was recruited from Redfern in Sydney in 1908

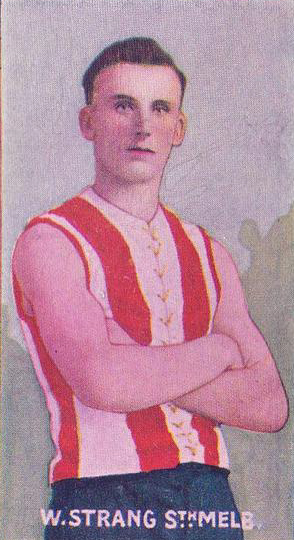
Bill Strang in 1907 was from Albury

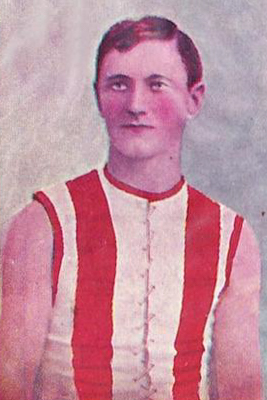
Harry Lampe in 1905 was from Wagga

== Principal venues ==
The following venues are the largest that meet AFL Standard criteria and have been used to host AFL (National Standard) or AFLW level matches (Regional Standard) and have hosted such matches in the last decade:

| Sydney | Sydney | Sydney |
|---|---|---|
| Stadium Australia | Sydney Cricket Ground | Sydney Showground Stadium |
| Capacity: 82,500 | Capacity: 48,000 | Capacity: 25,500 |
| Record: 72,393 (2003) | Record: 46,323 (2017) | Record: 21,924 (2013) |
| Sydney | Sydney | Albury |
| Henson Park | North Sydney Oval | Lavington Sports Ground |
| Capacity: 30,000 | Capacity: 16,000 | Capacity: 13,000 |
| Record: 5,722 (2023) | Record: 9,654 (2005) | Record: 20,169* (2013) |
| Wagga Wagga | Western Sydney | Sydney |
| Robertson Oval | Blacktown ISP Oval | Drummoyne Oval |
| Capacity: 10,000 | Capacity: 10,000 | Capacity: 6,000 |
| Record: 7,944 (2014) | Record: 10,000* (2011) | Record: 4,952 (2018) |
| Western Sydney | | |
| Tom Wills Oval | | |
| Capacity: 3,000 | | |

=== Sydney ===
- Sydney Cricket Ground
- Stadium Australia, Sydney Olympic Park
- Sydney Showground Stadium, Sydney Olympic Park
- North Sydney Oval
- Blacktown ISP Oval, Rooty Hill
- Bruce Purser Reserve, Kellyville
- Ern Holmes Oval, Pennant Hills
- Henson Park, Marrickville
- Picken Oval, Croydon Park
- Trumper Park Oval, Paddington
- Monarch Oval, Macquarie Fields
- Village Green, University of New South Wales, Kensington
- Drummoyne Oval
- Gore Hill Oval
- Olds Park, Penshurst
- University Oval, University of Sydney
- Jubilee Oval, Carlton

=== Regional NSW ===
- Lavington Sports Ground, Hamilton Valley, Albury
- Newcastle Number 1 Sports Ground, Newcastle
- Coffs Harbour International Stadium, Coffs Harbour
- Narrandera Sports Ground, Narrandera
- North Dalton Park, Towradgi, Wollongong
- Robertson Oval, Wagga Wagga

== Books ==
1. de Moore, Greg; Hess, Rob; Nicholson, Matthew; Stewart, Bob (2021). Australia's Game: The History of Australian Football. Hardie Grant Books. ISBN 9781-74379-657-3.
2. Blake, Martin (2013). The rise of the Swans : a decade of success : 2003-12. Melbourne, Vic.: Penguin Group (Australia). ISBN 978-1-921901-69-0. OCLC 829056262.

== See also ==
- Representative matches in Australian rules football
