= 1960 Minor States Carnival =

The 1960 Minor States Carnival was an edition of the lower division of Australian National Football Carnival, an Australian rules football interstate competition. The previous minor states carnival had been held as part of the 1958 Melbourne Carnival. The competition was won by the Victorian Football Association.

The minor states carnival was played in two parts:

- A round-robin competition was held in Sydney between 25 June and 3 July amongst the Victorian Football Association – which was relegated from Division 1 at the 1958 Melbourne Carnival – New South Wales, Queensland and Canberra.
- A playoff match for promotion to the top division was then played in Canberra between the Australian Amateurs – which had won Division 2 of the 1958 Melbourne Carnival – and the winner of the round robin.

== Results ==
	Sydney Carnival
Saturday, 25 June	New South Wales 14.24 (108)	def.	Queensland 13.19 (97)	Trumper Park (crowd: 4,000)
Sunday, 26 June	Victoria (VFA) 17.31 (133)	def.	Canberra 3.11 (29)	Trumper Park (crowd: 6,000)
Wednesday, 29 June	New South Wales 13.12 (90)	def.	Canberra 13.10 (88)	Trumper Park
Wednesday, 29 June	Victoria (VFA) 22.20 (152)	def.	Queensland 3.7 (25)	Trumper Park
Saturday, 2 July	Canberra 16.16 (112)	def.	Queensland 13.10 (88)	Trumper Park
Sunday, 3 July	Victoria (VFA) 23.24 (162)	def.	New South Wales 8.9 (57)	Trumper Park

	Play-off match
Saturday, 30 July	Australian Amateurs 8.7 (55)	def. by	Victoria (VFA) 12.9 (81)	Manuka Oval
