= 1974 Minor States Carnival =

The 1974 Minor States Carnival, known more formally as the 1974 ANFC Division 2 Championship was an edition of the lower division of Australian National Football Carnival, an Australian rules football interstate competition. The competition was won by Queensland.

== Results ==
	Semi-finals
Saturday, 15 June	Australian Capital Territory 20.15 (135)	def.	Amateurs 13.15 (93)	Erskineville Oval
Saturday, 15 June	Queensland 15.16 (106)	def.	New South Wales 9.12 (66)	Erskineville Oval

	Third place playoff
Monday, 17 June	New South Wales 13.14 (92)	def.	Amateurs 10.21 (81)	Erskineville Oval

	Final
Monday, 17 June	Queensland 10.8 (68)	def.	Australian Capital Territory 7.10 (52)	Erskineville Oval
