= Roger Duffy (Australian rules footballer) =

Australian rules footballer

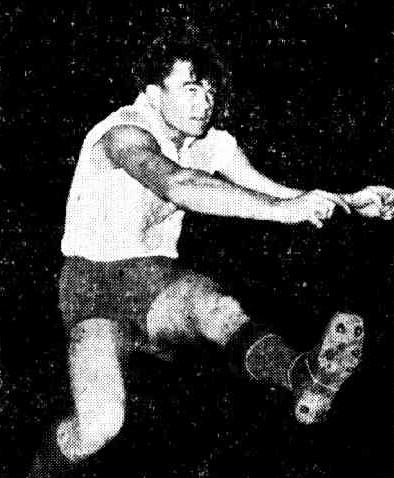

Personal information
- Born: 26 September 1931
- Died: 9 July 2003 (aged 71)
- Original team: Newtown (Sydney)
- Height: 180 cm (5 ft 11 in)
- Weight: 79 kg (174 lb)

Playing career^{1}
Years	Club	Games (Goals)
1952–1958	Footscray	117 (117)
- ^{1} Playing statistics correct to the end of 1958.

Career highlights
- Footscray premiership player, 1954; Victoria representative, 1957

Roger Duffy (26 September 1931 – 9 July 2003) was an Australian rules footballer who played with Footscray in the Victorian Football League (VFL) during the 1950s.

Duffy was originally from Newtown and as a full-forward topped the club's goalkicking with 78 goals in 1950 and 96 the next year. He was then recruited to Footscray and made his debut in 1952, his tally of 20 goals more than any of his teammate for the year.

He was one of the better players in the 1954 Grand Final with 16 kicks from the half forward flank.
