= East Coast Eagles =

Names
- Full name: East Coast Eagles Australian Football Club
- Nickname: Eagles
- Club song: We're a Happy team at East Coast

AFL Sydney Premier Division 2026 season
- Home-and-away season: Men's: 10th (Wooden Spooners); Women's: 7th

Club details
- Founded: 3 February 1976; 50 years ago
- Colours
- Competition: AFL Sydney
- President: Michael Lambert
- Coach: Men's: Ben Rogers; Women's: Ash Moeller
- Captain(s): Nathan Coxall (C) and Cameron Edwards (VC)
- Premierships: AFL Sydney Men's Premier Division (4): 2009; 2010; 2011; 2016; AFL Sydney Women's Premier Division (3): 2022; 2023; 2024
- Ground: Bruce Purser Reserve (2008-Present)
- Former ground: Ern Holmes Oval (1976-1980); Charles McLaughlin Reserve (1976-2008)

Uniforms
Home	Away	Heritage

Other information
- Official website: eastcoasteagles.com.au

The East Coast Eagles is an Australian rules football club competing in the AFL Sydney competition based out of the Sydney suburb of Rouse Hill. They have previously been known as the Baulkham Hills Hawks/Kookaburras (1976–1992), Baulkham Hills Falcons (1988–1999), and Sydney Hills Eagles (2012–2014).

== History ==
=== Hawks and Kookaburras (1976-1992) ===
The history of the East Coast Eagles is traced back to the formation of the Baulkham Hills junior Australian football club on 3 February 1976. The club wore gold and brown colours as one of the founding members, Barry Toy, was a former Hawthorn Football Club player. The club started with funds of just $32.15. The club played their first games on 3 April 1976, with their under 11s, under 13s, and under 15s teams playing against Warringah, and the under 17s playing against Forrest District. In the mid-to-late 1980s it was not uncommon for two Baulkham Hills teams (then known as the Hawks and the Kookaburras) to play each other in grand finals.

In 1988, the club had enough numbers to field an under 19 team in the Sydney Football League. As the Sydney University club could not field an under 19 team, Baulkham Hills played in their stead. The team had a successful season, eventually finishing in third place on the ladder at the end of the home and away season. They would face cross-town rivals Pennant Hills in their first semi-final. Though Baulkham Hills would lose their first final. As this under 19s team was an amalgamation of players from the Hawks and the Kookaburras, a new emblem – the Falcons – was born. Though teams would still be distinguished as Kookas and Hawks into the 1990s. The team played in a maroon jersey with gold stripes, similar to the jersey of the Subiaco club playing in the WAFL. In 1989 the club played in the stead of the East Sydney Australian Football Club.

In the early 80s Baulkham Hills played in the SDSFA at their home ground at the Kellyville Postal Institute Club, then later moved to Charles McLaughlin Reserve. This period of the club was not a successful one and both the First and Reserve Grade teams went long periods without wins.

In 1989, the club fielded a senior team competing in the Sydney Football Association competition. The team met with moderate success in their first year, finishing fourth in a seven team competition, being knocked out of the finals race in the first semi-final.

In 1990, the club had gathered enough support from ex-junior players and disenchanted players from other clubs to field teams in the Sydney Football Association (SFA) Division 1 competition in the first grade, reserve grade, and under 20s competitions. 1990 was a successful season, with the first grade team eventually being knocked out in the semi finals to the Sutherland Sharks at Erskineville Oval with a final score of 11.12 (78) to 9.13 (67). Doug Scholz won the Snow Medal for the best and fairest player in the competition. The under 20s team had more success wining their Grand Final against the Wollongong Lions 13.14. (92) to 7.4. (46).

In 1991, the Baulkham Hills Kookaburras won their first senior premiership in a keenly fought match at Roger Sheeran Oval, in front of a crowd of over 1'000. Baulkham Hills player Peter "Soapy" Sheehan scored two goals in the match, to make a total of 91 scored over the season. He was the leading goalkicker for the 1991 SFA season. The Kookaburras defeated Balmain 15.19 (109) to 12.17 (89)

=== Falcons in the SFL (1993-1999) ===
In 1992 the club's success in the recent seasons in the SFA saw them be offered a spot in the Sydney Football League (SFL). The club felt they needed another year to prepare, and so they entered the SFL at the start of the 1993 season instead. At the time of joining they were the only fully integrated team in the league, with an unbroken development pathway from under 9s to SFL First Grade.

The Baulkham Hills Falcons, as the newest team in the league, had their first win in the SFL against East Sydney Bulldogs, the oldest team in the league. The Falcons took an early lead in the round 2 game, with East Sydney trailing by 13 points at the end of the first quarter. The game was hard fought and came down to a kick after the final siren. With East Sydney leading by 4 points Falcons winger Jarrod Crosby kicked the winning goal, and Baulkham Hills managed to come away with a narrow two point victory, with a final score of 15.12 (102) to 13.22 (100).

The Falcons would however go on to endure a tough couple of years in 1993 and 1994 before making the preliminary final in 1995, matching the expectation that club President Tony Hall had set for the team in 1993 to make finals within three years. It was in 1995 that the club produced its first Phelan Medallist in ruckman Graham Jones. Between 1996 and 1999 the club struggled, never finishing higher than fifth on the ladder.

In 1998, the club was coached by former Fitzroy Lions and West Coast Eagles player Craig McGrath. Jarrod Crosby won the club's second Phelan Medal that year.

=== East Coast Eagles (2000-2011) ===
On 26 November 1999, Baulkham Hills Falcons struck up a partnership with the West Coast Eagles. As part of the partnership Baulkham Hills would be renamed the East Coast Eagles, and adopted the West Coast away kit. East Coast would gain access to expertise from West Coast, including from the coach Ken Judge. In return West Coast hoped to build their number of supporters along the eastern coast of Australia.

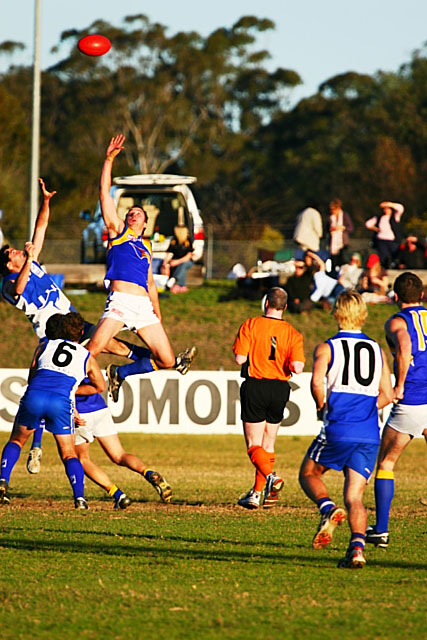
East Coast play Campbelltown Kangaroos in round 12, 2006

At the start of the 2006 season Jon Vlatko, who had joined the club the previous year, was made captain. East Coast were undefeated throughout the home and away season, and easily won their second semi final to qualify for the grand final. But in a shock result, the Eagles suffered their only loss of the season on grand final day, going down by two points to Pennant Hills in wet conditions at Henson Park, with a final score of 7.6 (48) to 5.20 (50).

In 2008 the club finished the season in fourth before defeating North Shore (by 50 points), St George (by 65) and UNSW/Eastern Suburbs (by 45) to reach their second Grand Final in three years against archrivals Pennant Hills. Despite trailing by just 17 points at half time, the Eagles ended up going down by 104 points.

In 2009 the club moved to their new oval Bruce Purser Reserve on the corner of Withers Rd and Commercial Rd, Rouse Hill

In 2009, The East Coast Eagles won their first ever AFL Sydney Premiership, winning the Grand Final against UNSW/Eastern Suburbs 22.12 (144) to 13.12 (90). Gus Seebeck kicked 10 goals for the game, bringing the 32-year old's season total to 111.

Captain, Jon Vlatko was named as the Club Champion in 2009, with Gus Seebeck finishing as runner up. Mark Skuse was announced as the Player's Player. In Division 1, Josh Shepherd claimed his third straight Best and Fairest award at the club by winning the Bill McLeod Medal, after taking out the Premier Cup Under 18's Best and Fairest award in 2007 and 2008.

The 2010 season saw the Eagles finish in third on the ladder and, after a successful final series, come up against Sydney University Students in the Grand Final. The Students had been undefeated since their round 4 loss to North Shore. The game, played at Blacktown Olympic Park, had drawn a large crowd to support the Students. The University club had played in multiple divisions’ grand finals that day and most of the players from those sides stayed to cheer on the Premier Division side. With drums and a vuvuzela, the Students fans made an unusually loud and vibrant crowd for an AFL Sydney Premier Division Grand Final. Mitch Thompson scored the first goal, for the Eagles, in the sixth minute. The Students would lead the scoring for most of the first half of the game, but the Eagles were never far behind, with the Students only leading by three points at the half time break – 7.5 (47) to 7.2 (44).

The Eagles scored the first three goals of the second half to take the lead, but it was not a lead they would keep for long and the lead would continue to flip between the two teams. With ten minutes left in the game a play from Jon Vlatko and Peter Dugmore managed to give the Eagles a two goal lead. Despite heavy pressure from the Students, the Eagles would hold this lead and won the game 13.9 (87) to 10.10 (70). At the final siren the Eagles’ fans jumped the fence and ran onto the field to celebrate with the team. Damien Bowles claimed the Rod Podbury Medal on Grand Final Day. Bowles also polled the most votes from the Phelan Medal, however was ruled ineligible owing to suspension earlier in the season.

The Eagles' U/18 team were defeated in their Grand Final by Sydney University. The game was an 87 point tie at the end of regulation time, and so two five-minute halves were played for extra time. Final scores after extra time were Students 15.9 (99) to Eagles 15.3 (93). Luke McLeod won the Division One medal named after his father Bill. James Ford took out the Division Three B&F whilst Dean Costello and Adam Hutt won their respective U/18 awards in Premier and Challenge Cup.

In 2011 the East Coast Eagles played in the inaugural Foxtel Cup, with their first game on 14 May 2011 against Port Adelaide Magpies. The Eagles lost the first round match by 92 points, with the final score at East Coast 2.3 (15) to Port Adelaide 16.11 (107). Steve O'Connor scored the Eagles only goals.

The Eagles had far more success in the AFL Sydney Premier Division. For the fifth time in six years the Eagles made the Grand Final, now chasing their first three-peat. The Eagles came up against the Balmain Dockers, who at the time were partnered with the Fremantle Dockers, meaning both teams in the Premier Division Grand Final were partnered with the two AFL teams from Western Australia. Balmain won the coin toss and elected to kick to the railway end of Blacktown International Sports Park. The Eagles started the scoring quickly, with Stephen O’Connor scoring a goal within the first minute of the game. East Coast had a dominating first quarter, going into the second with a 51 point lead, which they extended out to 70 points at half-time with the score at 14.7 (91) to 3.3 (21).

The second half of the game saw Balmain almost come back, holding the Eagles goalless, with Balmain player Troy Osland scoring a goal from well outside the 50 metre arc. By the end of the third quarter the Dockers had managed to cut the Eagles lead down to just 44 points. The Eagles would maintain their lead in the final quarter and won the Grand Final 17.12 (114) to 10.11 (71). Jack Dimery won the Rod Podbury Medal for his performance in the game.

=== Eagles in the NEAFL (2012-2014) ===
Following the completion of the 2011 season, the club was admitted to the North East Australian Football League and subsequently the name of the club was changed to the Sydney Hills Eagles.

In December 2012, it was announced that Marc Dragicevic had been recruited as coach of the Eagles' NEAFL team. In 2014 long time captain Jon Vlatko reached the milestone of 150 games for the Eagles. Former Eagles player Michael Sankey, took over coaching duties in 2014.

The years of 2012, 2013 and 2014 were spent playing in the NEAFL competition as the Sydney Hills Eagles. During this time the Men's AFL Sydney Premier Division team, which had previously won three back to back grand finals in 2009, 2010, and 2011 and been minor premiers in 2008, struggled to continue with their previous form. They failed to make finals, and even won the Wooden spoon in 2013.

=== Return to AFL Sydney (2015-present) ===
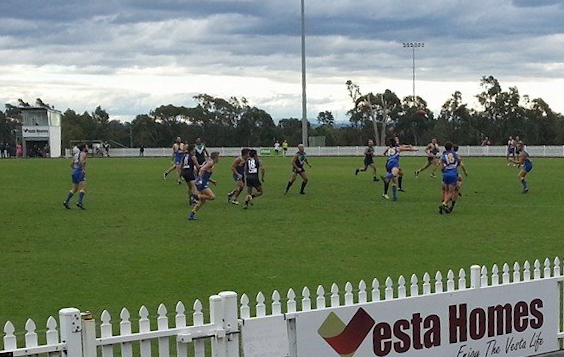
East Coast play UTS Bats in round 3, 2015

In 2015 the Eagles left the NEAFL and returned to older name of East Coast. This saw an almost immediate turnaround in the fortunes of the Men's Premier Division side. The 2015 season started with a home game at Kanebridge Oval against the Manly Giants. The Eagles started the game well, leading 13.2 (80) to 6.10 (46) at three-quarter time. However Manly would turn the tables in the last quarter, scoring 52 points and ending the game with the final score at East Coast 15.5 (95) to Manly 14.14 (98).

Despite the less than stellar start to the 2015 season the Eagles would go on to win every other game they played, finishing as minor premiers. The Eagles won their first game in the Finals series against Pennant Hills Demons 9.9 (63) to 7.9 (51), Two weeks later the Eagles would face the Demons again, this time in the Grand Final. Despite leading the Demons at the end of the third quarter 6.12 (48) to 6.3 (39), the Eagles were ultimately defeated 7.12 (54) to 14.5 (89). Their first and last games of the year being their only loses, the two games echoed each other, with convincing three-quarter time margins ultimately being overturned in the last quarter.

2016 saw a similarly dominating performance, with the Premier Division side losing only two games. Round 1 saw a Grand Final replay, with East Coast winning the game 16.4 (100) to 10.4 (64).East Coast lost only two games in the regular season, both to North Shore Bombers, in Round 3 and Round 18. East Coast would meet St George in the Grand Final. Despite a close first quarter, East Coast would go on to dominate much of the game, with Jon Vlakto scoring six goals for the Eagles. The final score was East Coast 17.5 (107) to St George 9.12 (66). The Eagles Men's team remained competitive through the rest of the decade, making finals again in 2017, 2018, and 2019.

Meanwhile, the Eagles Women's teams were also seeing success. 2019 saw the Women's Division Two team win a premiership against Macquarie University in a 46 point victory. The Women also competed in the Premier Division for the first time. The Eagles started the season with a 99 point trashing, defeating UTS Bats 15.16 (106) to 1.1 (7). The Eagles remained almost undefated, losing only to Sydney University in round 4. Round 11 saw the Eagles defeat the Newtown Breakaways by 209 points, while keeping Newtown scoreless. They ended the Women's Premier Division season as Minor Premiers, but were defeated in the Grand Final at Blacktown by Macquarie University 7.7 (49) to 4.3 (27).

2021 saw the women's Premier Division team continuing its success, playing its first ten games undefeated. However, the season was cut short due to the COVID-19 pandemic, and the season was abandoned without a finals series being played.

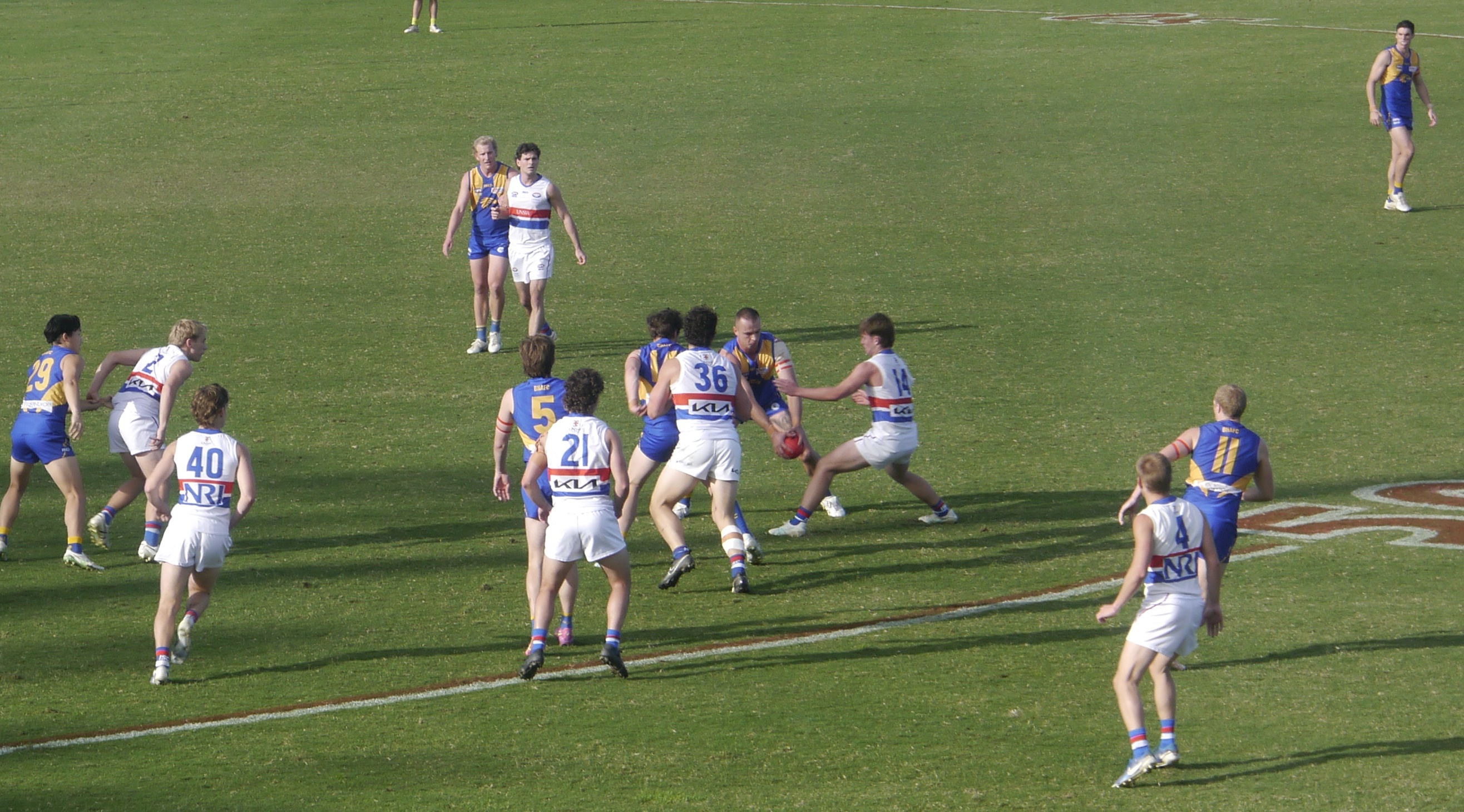
East Coast in their first win of the AFL Sydney Premier Division 2026 season

By 2022 fortunes had turned for the Men's, with the Premier Division team finishing last after having lost all 15 games in the season. In the same year the East Coast Eagles Women's Premier Division side won the first of their eventual Three-peat grand final victories in 2022, 2023, and 2024. In the 2024 Season the Women's team lost only three games, two to the Manly Warringah Wolves who were the only team to defeat the Eagles in both the regular season and the finals series.

In 2027 East Coast Eagles will compete alongside eight other AFL Sydney Premier Division teams in the Sydney Football League. In October 2026 the club began to tease on social media that the team's name would change before the start of the 2027 season, this followed the club registering the business name WSU Giants on 2 September 2026.

== Club identity and culture ==
=== Guernseys ===
The club's current home guernsey is based on the West Coast Eagles uniforms of blue and gold, with blue shorts and socks. For away games the club wears white shorts, and during the Back to Baulko round wear an older traditional uniform in the style of Hawthorn.

==== Uniform evolution ====
Baulkham Hills; Hawks (1976-1992)	Baulkham Hills; Kookaburras (1976-1992)	Baulkham Hills; Falcons (1993-1999)	East Coast; Eagles (2000-2002)	East Coast; Eagles (2003-2017)	East Coast; Eagles (2018 - 2026)

=== Theme Song ===
The East Coast Eagles song is sung to the tune of The Yankee Doodle Boy.

We're a happy team at East Coast
We're the Eagles flying high
We love our football and we play it to win
Riding the bumps with a grin
(At East Coast)
Come along, you’ll find us striving
Teamwork is the thing that talks,
All for one and one for all
Is the way we play at East Coast.
We are the Eagles flying high

When the club was known as Baulkham Hills Faclons the first line was:

We're a happy team at Baulko

=== Warren "Pops" Quintrell Shield ===
Since the then Baulkham Hills Falcons were first promoted to the SFL in 1993, they have played for the Pops Quintrell Shield against cross town rivals Pennant Hills Demons. The shield is named after Warren "Pops" Quintrell, who was instrumental in the founding of the Baulkham Hills Falcons, Pennant Hills Demons, and the junior team Kellyville/Rouse Hill Magpies.

When the contest is held at East Coast's home ground the club puts on Back to Baulko Day celebrations, honouring the clubs heritage. The 50th anniversary of the club was celebrated in round 3, 2026 with all levels of the East Coast Eagles playing at home for Back to Baulko Day. The Eagles' Women's Premier Division team scored 12.9. (81) while keeping Pennant Hills scoreless. The Men's Premier Division side had less success, being defeated by 99 points.

== Club honours ==
Premierships
Competition	Level	Wins	Years won
AFL Sydney Men's	Premier Division	4	2009, 2010, 2011, 2016
AFL Sydney Men's	Division One (SFA)	1	1991
AFL Sydney Men's	Under 20s (SFA)	1	1990
AFL Sydney Women's	Premier Division	3	2022, 2023, 2024
AFL Sydney Women's	Division Two	2	2019, 2025
Finishing positions
AFL Sydney Men's; Premier Division	Minor premiership	4	2006, 2009, 2015, 2016
AFL Sydney Men's; Premier Division	Grand Finalist	3	2006, 2008, 2015
AFL Sydney Men's; Premier Division	Wooden spoons	7	1997, 1998, 2002, 2013, 2022, 2023, 2024
AFL Sydney Women's; Premier Division	Minor premiership	4	2019, 2021*, 2022, 2024
AFL Sydney Women's; Premier Division	Grand Finalist	1	2019

^{*} The 2021 season was affected by the COVID-19 pandemic in New South Wales

=== List of Grand Final Victories ===
Year	Competition	Opponent	Score	Venue
1990	Sydney Football Association Under 20s	Wollongong Lions	13.14. (92) – 7.4. (46)	Erskineville Oval
1991	Sydney Football Association Division One	Balmain	15.19 (109) – 12.17 (89)	Roger Sheeran Oval
2009	AFL Sydney Men's Premier Division	UNSW-ES Bulldogs	22.12 (144) – 13.12 (90)	Blacktown Olympic Park
2010	AFL Sydney Men's Premier Division	Sydney Uni Students	13.9 (87) – 10.10 (70)	Blacktown Olympic Park
2011	AFL Sydney Men's Premier Division	Balmain Dockers	17.12 (114) – 10.11 (71)	Blacktown Olympic Park
2016	AFL Sydney Men's Premier Division	St George Dragons	17.5 (107) – 9.12 (66)	Blacktown Olympic Park
2019	AFL Sydney Women's Division Two	Macquarie Uni	9.5 (59) – 2.1 (13)	Blacktown Olympic Park
2022	AFL Sydney Women's Premier Division	Manly Warringah Wolves	6.5 (41) – 2.11 (23)	Henson Park
2023	AFL Sydney Women's Premier Division	UTS Bats	8.8 (56) – 1.6 (12)	Blacktown Olympic Park
2024	AFL Sydney Women's Premier Division	Manly Warringah Wolves	9.9 (63) – 5.2 (32)	Blacktown Olympic Park
2025	AFL Sydney Women's Division Two	Southern Power	4.9 (33) – 1.4 (10)	

== Individual honours ==
=== Phelan Medal winners ===
The Phelan Medal is awarded to the best player in the AFL Sydney Men's Premier Division during the home-and-away season as voted by the umpires:

- Graham Jones (1995)
- Jarrod Crosby (1998)
- Jack Dimery (2016)

=== Rod Podbury Medal winners ===
The Rod Podbury Medal is awarded to the player judged best-on-ground in the AFL Sydney Men's Premier Division Grand Final:

- Kristian Pearson (2006)
- Gus Seebeck (2009)
- Damien Bowles (2010)
- Jack Dimery (2011)
- Kieran Emery (2016)

=== AFL Players ===
The following Baulkham Hills Falcons/East Coast Eagles players have played in the Australian Football League:

- Nathan Gordon (Sydney Swans and Richmond)
- Ryan Houlihan (Carlton)
- Dion Myles (Sydney Swans)
- Terry Thripp (Sydney Swans)
- Sanford Wheeler (Sydney Swans)
- Josaia Delana (GWS)

=== AFLW Players ===
The following East Coast Eagles players have played in the AFL Women's:

- Ally Dallaway (GWS and Richmond)
- Teagan Germech (GWS and Port Adelaide)
- Renee Tomkins (GWS)

== Seasons ==
Premiers	Grand Finalist	Minor premiers	Wooden spoon

=== NEAFL ===
Sydney Hills Eagles NEAFL seasons
Year	No.	P	W	D	L	%
2012	5th (East)	18	10	0	8	102.5
2013	7th (East)	18	7	0	11	88.6
2014	10th	18	6	0	12	80.9

=== AFL Sydney Men's Premier Division ===
Known as Sydney Football League until 1997, and Sydney AFL Premier Division from 1997-2009

Baulkham Hills Falcons/East Coast Eagles AFL Sydney Men's Premier Division seasons
Year	No.	P	W	D	L	%
1993	9th	16	4	0	12	63.09
1994	9th	18	4	0	14	61.44
1995	3rd	18	10	0	8	101.60
1996	6th	18	7	2	9	83.44
1997	7th	16	3	0	13	61.80
1998	7th	14	4	0	10	78.01
1999	6th	21	5	1	15	69.70
2000	7th	16	7	0	9	92.04
2001	7th	16	6	0	10	90.85
2002	9th	16	3	0	13	76.31
2003	6th	17	5	0	12	89.45
2004	5th	18	9	1	8	108.29
2005	5th	16	9	0	7	132.40
2006	1st	16	16	0	0	211.09
2007	5th	18	10	0	8	121.32
2008	4th	18	13	0	5	157.30
2009	1st	18	14	0	4	181.51
2010	3rd	18	13	0	5	192.67
2011	4th	18	15	1	2	229.57
2012*	7th*	18*	5*	0*	13*	61.19 *
2013*	12th*	18*	1*	0*	17*	46.05*
2014*	9th*	18*	4*	0*	14*	60.31*
2015	1st	16	15	0	1	292.34
2016	1st	16	14	0	2	182.21
2017	5th	16	7	0	9	96.54
2018	5th	18	11	0	7	119.34
2019	4th	18	11	0	7	110.31
2020**	7th**	9**	2**	0**	7**	69.27**
2021**	8th**	10**	2**	0**	8**	69.39**
2022	10th	15	0	0	15	29.44
2023	9th	16	1	0	15	38.03
2024	10th	18	2	0	16	49.83
2025	9th	18	4	0	14	59.96
2026	10th	18	2	0	16	40.16

Ongoing Seasons in italic text.

^{*} In the 2012-2014 Seasons, Sydney Hills Eagles also participated in the North East Australian Football League
^{**} The 2020 and 2021 seasons were affected by the COVID-19 pandemic in New South Wales

=== AFL Sydney Women's Premier Division ===
East Coast Eagles AFL Sydney Women's Premier Division seasons
Year	No.	P	W	D	L	%
2019	1st	17	16	0	1	600.44
2020*	2nd*	9*	7*	0*	2*	262.22*
2021*	1st*	10*	10*	0*	0*	424.26*
2022	1st	16	13	0	3	222.91
2023	2nd	16	14	1	1	447.30
2024	1st	16	14	0	2	310.97
2025	4th	15	10	0	5	222.35
2026	7th	14	4	0	12	36.23

Ongoing Seasons in italic text.

^{*} The 2020 and 2021 seasons were affected by the COVID-19 pandemic in New South Wales
