= Phelan Medal =

Annual award given in the AFL Sydney

The Phelan Medal is an annual award given in the AFL Sydney. It is awarded to best and fairest player of the Premier Division competition each year and is named after former NSW League official James (Jim) E. Phelan (1860–1939). It is seen to be the Sydney AFL equivalent to the Brownlow Medal.

The best and fairest player in the Sydney League was first presented an unnamed award in 1926. In 1932, Mr Aub D.S. Provan, the NSW Australian National Football League president donated a trophy titled the "Provan Trophy" to the winner. The name was changed to the Phelan Medal in 1937.

Due to the cancellation of the 2021 AFL Sydney season due to the COVID-19 outbreak across Greater Sydney, the medal was not awarded in 2021.

== Phelan Medallists ==
Year	Winner	Club	Votes
1926	Bobby Powers	Sydney	0
1927	Gordon Knott	Western Suburbs	0
1928	Billy McKoy (1)	Sydney	0
1929	Billy McKoy (2)	Sydney	0
1930	David Elliman	North Shore	0
1931	George Jenner	St George	0
1932	Len Harris	St George	0
1933	Jack Williamson (1)	Eastern Suburbs	0
1934	Frank Smith	South Sydney	0
1935	Jack Williamson (2)	Eastern Suburbs	0
1936	Reg Garvin	Newtown	0
1937	Jack Williamson (3)	Eastern Suburbs	0
1938	Jack Williamson (4)	Eastern Suburbs	0
1939	Jack Guthrie	North Shore	23
1940	Cliff Barnsley (1)	Sydney	37
1941	Cliff Barnsley (2)	Sydney	27
1942	Not Awarded		
1943	Not Awarded		
1944	Not Awarded		
1945	Not Awarded		
1946	Billy Cottis	Newtown	5
1947	Ken Champion (1)	North Shore	0
1948	Ken Champion (2)	Western Suburbs	21
1949	Ken Gilbert (1)	Illawarra	0
1950	Ken Gilbert (2)	Illawarra	0
1951	John Hardy	North Shore	34
1952	Frank Gascoigne	South Sydney	23
1953	Geoff Davidson	Sydney University	28
1954	Wally Bryce (1)	Liverpool	19
1955	Wally Bryce (2)	Liverpool	20
1956	Ray Moore	Balmain	0
1957	Colin Waller	Liverpool	17
1958	Kevin Batchelor	South Sydney	0
1959	Ralph Turner (1)	South Sydney	37
1960	Tony Whish-Wilson	Bankstown	20
1961	Ralph Turner (2)	Sydney Naval	24
1962	Arthur Crisp	North Shore	3
1963	Ray Sharrock	Western Suburbs	0
1964	Ray Gwilliam	South Sydney	24
1965	Noel Reading	St George	15
1966	Norm Tuxford	Sydney Naval	20
1967	Peter Body	Sydney Naval	21
1968	Graham Hodge	Southern Districts	15
1969	Brian Tyler (1)	Eastern Suburbs	22
1970	Bob Mcdonald	Balmain	21
1971	Noel Stewart	Southern Districts	22
1972	Paul Bouchier	Newtown	23
1973	George Allen (1)	Western Suburbs	22
1974	Brian Tyler (2)	South Sydney	20
1975	George Allen (2)	Western Suburbs	30
1976	Max Hodgson	Balmain	29
1977	Dale Dalton	St George	21
1978	Jack McCormick	Southern Districts	26
1979	Rob Claridge	East Sydney	21
1980	John Pilkington (1)	Newtown	20
1981	Laurie Axford	East Sydney	23
1982	John Pilkington (2)	Newtown	19
1983	Michael Toy	Pennant Hills	16
1983	Rod Podbury (1)	Bankstown	16
1984	Graham Jones (1)	Western Suburbs	15
1985	Frank Gleeson	Balmain	24
1986	Rod Podbury (2)	Campbelltown	16
1987	Rod Podbury (3)	Campbelltown	18
1988	Garry Spillane	Pennant Hills	21
1989	Michael Porta	Holroyd-Parramatta	19
1990	Michael Davis	Sydney University	17
1990	Rod Podbury (4)	Campbelltown	17
1991	David West	St George	22
1992	Darren Oates	St George	19
1992	Lee Campbell	Campbelltown	19
1993	Tony Quinn	St George	20
1994	Chris O'Dwyer	East Sydney	28
1995	Graham Jones (2)	Baulkham Hills	22
1996	Joe Cormack	Western Suburbs	21
1997	Simon Wilson	St George	16
1998	Jarrod Crosby	Baulkham Hills	22
1999	Trevor Burnett	Campbelltown	34
2000	Mark Mackenzie	Balmain	19
2001	Jason McPherson	UNSW-ES	16
2002	Troy Luff (1)	Balmain	20
2003	Jason Turner	Campbelltown	15
2004	Stephen Pech	UNSW-ES	19
2005	Dean Davies	North Shore	22
2006	Troy Luff (2)	UNSW-ES	21
2007	Charlie Richardson	Pennant Hills	16
2008	Matt Carey	Pennant Hills	17
2009	Brydon Coles	Sydney University	19
2010	Alex Lee	Sydney University	19
2011	Kieran Wright	Pennant Hills	20
2012	Dane Rampe	UNSW-ES	26
2013	Tyrone Armitage	Manly Warringah	23
2014	Alex Goodall	Pennant Hills	28
2015	Connor Pettersson	Manly Warringah	24
2016	Jack Dimery	East Coast Eagles	17
2017	Shaun Crane (1)	North Shore	15
2018	Shaun Crane (2)	North Shore	29
2019	Ranga Ediriwickrama	Pennant Hills	16
2020	Jake Bartholomeaus	Sydney University	16
2021	Not Awarded		
2022	Noah Casalini	St George	11
2022	Mitchell Conn	UNSW-ES	11
2022	Jake Veale	North Shore	11
2022	Stephen Wray	Pennant Hills	11
2023	Harry Maguire	Pennant Hills	18
2023	Ned Campbell (1)	North Shore	18
2023	Kale Gabila	Manly Warringah	18
2024	Ned Campbell (2)	North Shore	19
2025	Finbar Delbridge	South West Sydney	28
2026	Luke Parkinson	South West Sydney	23

== Multiple winners ==
The following players have won the Phelan Medal multiple times.

Medals	Player	Team	Seasons
4	Jack Williamson	Eastern Suburbs	1933, 1935, 1937, 1938
4	Rod Podbury	Bankstown/Campbelltown	1983, 1986, 1987, 1990
2	Billy McKoy	Sydney	1928, 1929
2	Cliff Barnsley	Sydney	1940, 1941
2	Ken Champion	North Shore/Western Suburbs	1947, 1948
2	Wally Bryce	Liverpool	1954, 1955
2	Ralph Turner	South Sydney/Sydney Naval	1959, 1961
2	Brian Tyler	Eastern Suburbs/South Sydney	1969, 1974
2	George Allen	Western Suburbs	1973, 1975
2	John Pilkington	Newtown	1980, 1982
2	Graham Jones	Western Suburbs/Baulkham Hills	1984, 1995
2	Troy Luff	Balmain /UNSW-ES	2002, 2006
2	Shaun Crane	North Shore	2017, 2018
2	Ned Campbell	North Shore	2023, 2024

== Phelan Medal wins by club ==
Club	Total wins	Years
Balmain	6	1956, 1970, 1976, 1985, 2000, 2002
Bankstown	2	1960, 1983
Baulkham Hills/East Coast Eagles	3	1995, 1998, 2016
Campbelltown	6	1986, 1987, 1990, 1992, 1999, 2003
East Sydney/Eastern Suburbs/UNSW-ES	13	1933, 1935, 1937, 1938, 1969, 1979, 1981, 1994, 2001, 2004, 2006, 2012, 2022
Holroyd-Parramatta	1	1989
Illawarra	2	1949, 1950
Liverpool/Southern Districts	6	1954, 1955, 1957, 1968, 1971, 1978
Manly Warringah	3	2013, 2015, 2023
Newtown	5	1936, 1946, 1972, 1980, 1982
North Shore	11	1930, 1939, 1947, 1951, 1962, 2005, 2017, 2018, 2022, 2023, 2024
Pennant Hills	9	1983, 1988, 2007, 2008, 2011, 2014, 2019, 2022, 2023
South Sydney	6	1934, 1952, 1958, 1959, 1964, 1974
South West Sydney	2	2025, 2026
St George	9	1931, 1932, 1965, 1977, 1991, 1992, 1993, 1997, 2022
Sydney	5	1926, 1928, 1929, 1940, 1941
Sydney Naval	3	1961, 1966, 1967
Sydney University	5	1953, 1990, 2009, 2010, 2020
Western Suburbs/Inner-West	7	1927, 1948, 1963, 1973, 1975, 1984, 1996

== See also ==
- Sydney AFL
- Mostyn Medal
- Bob Skilton Medal
- Brett Kirk Medal
- Kevin Sheedy Medal
