= Eastern Suburbs Australian Football Club =

East coast Australian sports team

East Sydney Bulldogs

Names
- Full name: East Sydney Australian Football Club
- Nickname: Bulldogs

Club details
- Founded: 1926; 100 years ago
- Colours: Blue, White, Red
- Competition: Sydney Football League
- Premierships: NSWAFA (2) "East Sydney": 1881, 1884; SFL (28): "East Sydney": 1903, 1911, 1918 "Paddington": 1915, 1916, 1917, 1919, 1920, 1922, 1924 "Eastern Suburbs":1926, 1927, 1941, 1953, 1954, 1955, 1956, 1957, 1958, 1959 "East Sydney": 1971, 1973, 1976, 1980, 1981, 1982, 1983, 1984

East Sydney Australian Football Club, formerly Eastern Suburbs, was a Sydney Football League Australian Football club based out of the eastern suburbs of Sydney in New South Wales.

They were formally known as the Bulldogs, though informally as the Tricolours.

== History ==
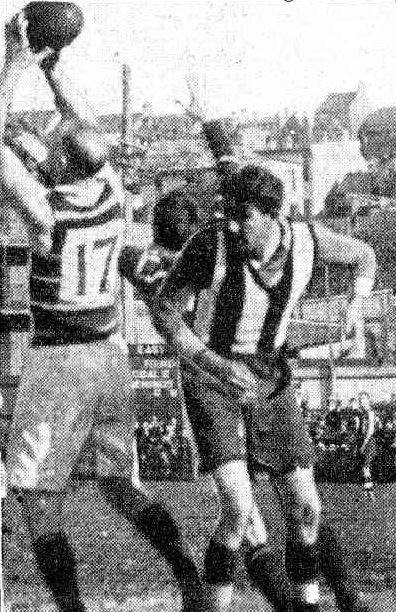
Eastern Suburbs play Newtown at Trumper Park Oval in 1931

Eastern Suburbs was formed after a merger between the NSWAFL foundation club East Sydney Australian Football Club, and the Paddington Australian Football Club in 1926. The same year the club was able to attract player with "good records" from other states. However, they lost a great number of players who had played for East Sydney in 1925, with most of them movng to the newly formed Western Suburbs football club. Though some key East Sydney players, including former captain, Pedler, stayed with the merged club. Eastern Suburbs was considered as an exceptionally strong team in 1926.

In 1927 a junior club was established as a feeder club for the senior team. Eastern Suburbs made finals appearances for the first three seasons after its merger.

Eastern Suburbs dominated the New South Wales Australian National Football League in the 1950s, with the club winning seven back-to-back premierships from 1953 to 1959, overtaking the previous record of six back-toback premierships held by Newtown. This is the largest number of back to back premierships held in the AFL Sydney Men's Premier Division. After the 1968 season the club returned to using the name East Sydney.

In 1999 Eastern Suburbs merged with University of New South Wales Australian National Football Club to become the UNSW-Eastern Suburbs Bulldogs.

== Club identity and culture ==
=== Home ground ===
The home ground for East Sydney Football Club was Trumper Park Oval in Paddington.

=== Guernseys ===
East Sydney played in the colours of blue with red and white hoops, similar to the Western Bulldogs.

== Individual honours ==
=== Phelan Medal winners ===
The Phelan Medal is awarded to the best player in the AFL Sydney Men's Premier Division during the home-and-away season as voted by the umpires:

- Jack Williamson (1933, 1935, 1937, 1938)
- Brian Tyler (1969)
- Rob Claridge (1979)
- Laurie Axford (1981)
- Chris O'Dwyer (1994)

=== AFL Players ===
The following East Sydney/Eastern Suburbs players have played in the Australian Football League:

- Mark Maclure (Carlton)
