= Sydney Football League =

Australian rules football competition

- Founded: 12 August 2026; 2 months ago
- No. of teams: 9
- State: New South Wales
- Streaming partner(s): Kayo Freebies

The Sydney Football League (SFL) is an upcoming Australian rules football competition based in Sydney. It will be the highest-level football competition in New South Wales, sitting one tier above AFL Sydney. In addition to senior competitions for men and women, the SFL will include under-19.5 men's and under-20 women's competitions.

== History ==
The SFL was announced by the Australian Football League (AFL) on 12 August 2026, featuring nine teams that were competing in the AFL Sydney Premier Division during the 2026 season. There will not be promotion or relegation from the SFL to AFL Sydney, with the AFL describing them as "separate competitions with different purposes".

One match per round will be streamed by Kayo Sports through Kayo Freebies. The inaugural SFL season will commence in April 2027.

== Clubs ==
Nine teams will compete in the inaugural SFL season in 2027, with licences awarded after a tender and assessment process. The location of each club was considered as part of the licence process in order to represents the main regions across Greater Sydney.

| Club | Colours | Nickname | Home ground | Former league | Est. | Years in SFL | SFL premierships | |
| Club | Colours | Nickname | Home ground | Former league | Est. | Years in SFL | Total | Years |
|---|---|---|---|---|---|---|---|---|
| Giants | (Note: Giants, formerly East Coast, have announced their new kit will be revealed on 6 November 2026. The guernsey will incoprate some or all of these colours.) | Giants | Bruce Purser Reserve, Rouse Hill | AFL Sydney | 1976 | 2027- | 0 | – |
| Manly-Warringah | | Wolves | Weldon Oval, Curl Curl | AFL Sydney | 1969 | 2027- | 0 | – |
| North Shore | | Bombers | Gore Hill Oval, St Leonards | AFL Sydney | 1903 | 2027- | 0 | – |
| Pennant Hills | | Demons | Mike Kenny Oval, Cherrybrook | AFL Sydney | 1971 | 2027- | 0 | – |
| South West Sydney | | Blues | Bob Prenter Oval, Macquarie Fields and Rosedale Oval, Warwick Farm | AFL Sydney | 2022 | 2027- | 0 | – |
| St George | | Dragons | Olds Park, Penshurst | AFL Sydney | 1929 | 2027- | 0 | – |
| Sydney University | | Students | University Oval, Camperdown | AFL Sydney | 1887 | 2027- | 0 | – |
| UNSW-Eastern Suburbs | | Bulldogs | Henson Park | AFL Sydney | 1999 | 2027- | 0 | – |
| UTS | | Bats | Waverley Oval, Bondi Junction | AFL Sydney | 2000 | 2027- | 0 | – |
