= Arthur Chilcott =

Australian rules footballer

Personal information
- Born: 26 February 1963 (age 63)
- Original team: Western Suburbs
- Height: 183 cm (6 ft 0 in)
- Weight: 83 kg (183 lb)

Playing career^{1}
Years	Club	Games (Goals)
1984–1985	Sydney Swans	13 (14)
- ^{1} Playing statistics correct to the end of 1985.

Arthur Chilcott (born 26 February 1963) is a former Australian rules footballer who played with the Sydney Swans in the Victorian Football League (VFL).

Chilcott was recruited from Sydney club Western Suburbs, but came from the Illawarra and was the first person from that region to play league football. While at Western Suburbs he twice finished equal third in the Phelan Medal, in 1982 and 1983.

Debuting in the 1984 VFL season, Chilcott appeared in 11 of the first 14 rounds, before being forced out of the side with injury. He kicked four goals in Sydney's round four win over Collingwood. The following year he made two league appearances. He left the Swans in 1986 to play rugby league for the Balmain Tigers.

He later played for the Bateman's Bay Seahawks in the Australian Capital Territory Football League.
