= St George AFC =

Names
- Full name: St George Australian Football Club
- Former name: St George Crows (2001–09)
- Nickname: Dragons
- Club song: The Yankee Doodle Boy

AFL Sydney Premier Division 2026 season
- Home-and-away season: Men's: 8th Women's: 6th

Club details
- Founded: 1928; 98 years ago
- Colours: Red White
- Competition: Sydney AFL
- President: Angie Zissis
- Coach: Men's Premier Division: Abraham Caroca; Women's Premier Division: Adam Parker/Jake Bennie
- Captain(s): Men's Premier Division: Nathaniel McKenzie-Hicks; Women's Premier Division: Kaitlyn Eisenhuth
- Premierships: List: 42 First Grade (5): 1937, 1938, 1943, 1964, 1993 Reserve Grade (11): 1951, 1956, 1958, 1975, 1978, 1986, 1997, 2012, 2017, 2019, 2022 Colts (19): 1961, 1962, 1968, 1969, 1970, 1972, 1973, 1974, 1975, 1976, 1977, 1983, 1985, 1989, 1992, 1995, 2004, 2014, 2017 Includes U18s and U19s Premierships Third Grade (2): 2017 (Division 4), 2024 (Division 4) Women's (2): 2019 (Division 3), 2023 (Division 1) Masters (3): 2018, 2019, 2022 Club Championships (10): 1956, 1958, 1959, 1960, 1961, 1962, 1973, 1983, 1997, 2016
- Ground: Olds Park

Uniforms
| Home | Away |

Other information
- Official website: stgeorgeafc.com.au

St George Australian Football Club Inc is an Australian Football club competing in the AFL Sydney competition and based in the area of St George, New South Wales. At one stage affiliated with the Adelaide Crows football club, they reverted to their traditional red and white colours in 2009.
They are currently known as the Dragons, and have previously been known as the Tigers, the Saints, and the Crows.

== History ==
St George Tigers play South Sydney in 1938. A South Sydney player spoils a kick from St. George.

The club was formed in 1929. For the first few years the club were known as the Tigers. The First Grade side first made finals in 1934, though were defeated by Newtown in the semi-final. That same year the Reserves Grade team went undefeated during the regular season, but were eliminated by South Sydney in the finals.

During the Second World War, St George, alongside fellow clubs Sydney and South Sydney, struggled to retain players. The three clubs had primarily relied on players in the armed forces, who were now being deployed.

Until 1965 St. George played at Hurstville Oval, before moving to their current home ground at Olds Park in Penshurst.

In 1993, St George ended a 29 year premiership drought with a 17.13 (115) — 9.26 (80) victory over North Shore. The presidents St George AFC and the St George Dragons exchanged faxes with each other, encouraging each other, with both teams playing in their respective code's Grand Final that year.

In 1996, Brian Langton was the patron of the club.

On 4 May 2000, the club formed a partnership with the Adelaide Crows, and changed their name at the start of the 2001 season to the St. George Crows. The partnership was estimated to be worth $30,000. The move drew criticism at the time from the Kangaroos.

In 2008, St. George celebrated their 80th anniversary. The club played in their traditional red and white colours, instead of the new Crows gurnseys for this event. The partnership with Adelaide lasted until 2009, when the club reverted to the previous name of St. George Dragons.

On 8 February 2009, St George's Club President, Greg McIver, was killed in the Black Saturday bushfires.

In 2013 the club undertook renovations to their clubrooms, including the addition of a gymnasium, among other facilities. A celebration was held for the opening of the new rooms, and many of the club's former Phelan Medal winners attended.

In 2027 the Dragons will compete alongside eight other AFL Sydney Premier Division teams in the Sydney Football League.

== Club identity and culture ==
=== Guernseys ===
The club's current home guernsey is similar to that of the St. George Illawarra Dragons uniforms of red and white. The club has previously worn guernseys based on the Richmond Tigers, and Adelaide Crows football clubs.

==== Uniform evolution ====
| St. George; Tigers (1929 - 1951) | St. George; Dragons (1964 - 1975) | St. George; Dragons (1975 - 1985) | St. George; Crows (2001 - 2009) | St. George; Dragons (2011) | St. George; Dragons (2016 - present) |

=== Theme Song ===
The club's song is sung to the tune of The Yankee Doodle Boy.

"Oh we're the St George team, the Dragons
A team of always do or die
Our victory we will always be assured
When for the ball the Dragons fly
And when the final bell is over
That's the time we celebrate
Oh, Dragons always stick together
We're a happy club forever
We are the good old red and white."

== Club Honours ==
=== Premierships ===
==== First Grade ====
| No. | Year | For | Opponent | Against |
|---|---|---|---|---|
| 1 | 1937 | 11.16 (82) | South Sydney | 6.9 (45) |
| 2 | 1938 | 6.20 (56) | Newtown | 1.9 (15) |
| 3 | 1943 | 12.19 (91) | South Sydney | 9.10 (64) |
| 4 | 1964 | 14.18 (102) | Western Suburbs | 4.18 (42) |
| 5 | 1993 | 17.13 (115) | North Shore | 9.26 (80) |

==== Reserve Grade ====
| No. | Year | For | Opponent | Against |
|---|---|---|---|---|
| 1 | 1951 | 7.8 (50) | Newtown | 5.7 (37) |
| 2 | 1956 | 7.12 (54) | Eastern Suburbs | 6.13 (49) |
| 3 | 1958 | 5.7 (37) | Eastern Suburbs | 4.5 (29) |
| 4 | 1975 | 13.15 (93) | East Sydney | 5.10 (40) |
| 5 | 1978 | 10.16 (76) | Newtown | 6.5 (41) |
| 6 | 1986 | 11.7 (73) | North Shore | 7.13 (55) |
| 7 | 1997 | 8.6 (54) | East Sydney | 5.9 (39) |
| 8 | 2012 | 7.8 (50) | UNSW-ES | 6.10 (46) |
| 9 | 2017 | 12.7 (79) | Sydney University | 5.5 (35) |
| 10 | 2019 | 10.7 (67) | Pennant Hills | 5.9 (39) |
| 11 | 2022 | 9.7 (61) | Sydney University | 7.11 (53) |

==== Colts (under 18s/19s) ====
| No. | Year | For | Opponent | Against |
|---|---|---|---|---|
| 1 | 1961 | 12.14 (86) | Eastern Suburbs | 10.10 (70) |
| 2 | 1962 | 9.21 (75) | Eastern Suburbs | 7.7 (49) |
| 3 | 1968 | 20.20 (140) | Western Suburbs | 7.5 (47) |
| 4 | 1969 | 13.7 (85) | Sydney Naval | 9.7 (61) |
| 5 | 1970 | 5.17 (47) | Western Suburbs | 5.6 (36) |
| 6 | 1972 | 11.12 (78) | HMAS Nirimba | 7.12 (54) |
| 7 | 1973 | 16.9 (105) | Southern Districts | 11.8 (74) |
| 8 | 1974 | 12.10 (82) | Southern Districts | 10.13 (73) |
| 9 | 1975 | 17.14 (116) | North Shore | 10.11 (71) |
| 10 | 1976 | 16.22 (118) | North Shore | 9.4 (58) |
| 11 | 1977 | 16.14 (110) | Southern Districts | 13.5 (83) |
| 12 | 1983 | 15.16 (106) | Campbelltown | 14.12 (96) |
| 13 | 1985 | 14.10 (94) | Campbelltown | 9.10 (64) |
| 14 | 1989 | 12.9 (81) | North Shore | 12.8 (80) |
| 15 | 1992 | 12.12 (84) | Hills | 9.10 (64) |
| 16 | 1995 | 15.9 (99) | Pennant Hills | 2.1 (13) |
| 17 | 2004 | 7.7 (49) | Pennant Hills | 7.6 (48) |
| 18 | 2014 | 11.11 (77) | North Shore | 4.6 (30) |
| 19 | 2017 | 10.13 (73) | North Shore | 6.10 (46) |

==== Third Grade ====
| No. | Year | For | Opponent | Against | Division |
|---|---|---|---|---|---|
| 1 | 2017 | 4.13 (37) | UTS | 2.5 (17) | Division 4 |
| 2 | 2024 | 7.5 (47) | Hawkesbury | 6.7 (43) | Division 4 |

==== Women's ====
| No. | Year | For | Opponent | Against | Division |
|---|---|---|---|---|---|
| 1 | 2019 | 10.6 (66) | Holroyd-Parramatta | 7.12 (54) | Division 3 |
| 2 | 2023 | 2.2 (14) | UTS | 1.2 (8) | Division 1 |

==== Masters (over 35s) ====
| No. | Year | For | Opponent | Against |
|---|---|---|---|---|
| 1 | 2018 | 12.7 (79) | North West Sydney | 4.6 (30) |
| 2 | 2019 | 6.13 (49) | Inner West | 2.2 (14) |
| 3 | 2022 | 7.4 (46) | Southern Dingoes | 6.3 (39) |

== Individual Honours ==
=== Phelan Medal winners ===
The Phelan Medal is awarded to the best player in the AFL Sydney Men's Premier Division during the home-and-away season as voted by the umpires:

- George Jenner (1931)
- Len Harris (1932)
- Noel Reading (1965)
- Dale Dalton (1977)
- David West (1991)
- Darren Oates (1992)
- Tony Quinn (1993)
- Simon Wilson (1997)
- Noah Casalini (2022)

=== Sanders Medal winners ===
The Sanders Medal is awarded to the best player in the AFL Sydney Men’s Division One during the home-and-away season as voted by the umpires:

- J. Mullaney (1940)
- A. Willatts (1941)

=== AFL Players ===
The following players have played in the Australian Football League:

- Nick Davis (Sydney Swans)
- Mark Roberts (Sydney Swans, Brisbane Bears, and North Melbourne)
- Dylan Addison (Western Bulldogs and GWS Giants)
- Nick Shipley (GWS Giants)
