= Robert Caprioli =

Australian rules footballer

Personal information
- Full name: Robert Caprioli
- Born: 11 July 1967 (age 59)
- Original teams: St George AFC, (Sydney FL)

Playing career^{1}
Years	Club	Games (Goals)
1986	Sydney	1 (0)
- ^{1} Playing statistics correct to the end of 1986.

Robert Caprioli (born 11 July 1967) is a former Australian rules footballer who played one game for Sydney in the Victorian Football League (VFL) in 1986. He was recruited from the St George AFC in the Sydney Football League. He was selected in the Swans' last home game of 1986 as a late replacement player. He was one of eight players from New South Wales in the Sydney team that day.
