= Terry Thripp =

Australian rules footballer

Personal information
- Full name: Terry Thripp
- Born: 31 October 1963 (age 63)
- Original team: Pennant Hills
- Height: 188 cm (6 ft 2 in)
- Weight: 78 kg (172 lb)
- Position: Utility

Playing career^{1}
Years	Club	Games (Goals)
1983–84, 1987–92	Sydney	78 (43)
- ^{1} Playing statistics correct to the end of 1992.

Terry Thripp (born 31 October 1963) is a former Australian rules footballer who played for Sydney in the Victorian/Australian Football League (VFL/AFL).

The first Sydney local to play with the Swans after they relocated, Thripp was recruited from Pennant Hills after playing his junior football for Baulkham Hills.

Thripp represented New South Wales at the 1988 Adelaide Bicentennial Carnival. Thripp had his best season in 1989 when he bagged 22 goals and had 291 kicks over the course of the season. A utility, he also gathered eight Brownlow Medal votes, equal second most by a Sydney player that year, behind Greg Williams.

Thripp also played a number of games at North Shore and is the centre half back in their official 'Team of the Century'. His father, Bill, was a footballer at Collingwood.
