= Pennant Hills Australian Football Club =

Pennant Hills Demons

Names
- Full name: Pennant Hills Australian Football Club
- Nickname: Demons
- Club song: Its a Grand Old Flag

AFL Sydney Premier Division 2025 season
- Home-and-away season: Men's: 6th Women's: 9th (Wooden spooners)

Club details
- Founded: 1966; 60 years ago (Juniors); 1971; 55 years ago (Seniors)
- Colours: Dark Blue and Red
- Competition: AFL Sydney
- President: Mark Carroll
- Coach: Jason Blakemore
- Captain: Mitchell Blow
- Premierships: AFL Sydney Men's Premier Division (5): 2000; 2006; 2008; 2015; 2017
- Ground: Greenway Park – Mike Kenny Oval
- Former ground: Ern Holmes Oval (1971–2011)

Uniforms
Home	Away

Other information
- Official website: phafl.com.au

Pennant Hills Demons is an Australian rules football club competing in the Sydney AFL Premier League and based out of the Sydney suburb of Pennant Hills. Previously known as The Hills AFC (1987–1992). Their home ground is Mike Kenny Oval.

== History ==
The Pennant Hills Australian Football Club can trace its origins to the formation of the Pennant Hills Junior Australian Football Club in 1966. The junior club was founded by Balmain player Bill Carey, and locals Ern Holmes (for who the club's previous home ground was named), Ken Telfer, and George Brack.

In 1971, Kerry James, who had previously coached the Pennant Hills Juniors under 17s team, established the senior men's team. The club was formed to give the under 17s a pathway into senior football. The club originally played in green and gold striped jumpers. The team entered a single team in Division 3 of the Sydney Districts Association. By 1974 there were two Pennant Hills senior teams competeing in the lower divisions of the Sydney Football League. Pennant Hills was promoted to the top Sydney grade, the Sydney Football League in 1977.

Pennant Hills played their first SFL Grand Final in 1982, being defeated 8.8 (56) to 5.8 (38) by East Sydney.

In 1987 the club was renamed The Hills Australian Football Club. This was done with the hope of gaining more sponsors and supporters in The Hills Shire. The club reverted to being known as Pennant Hills in 1993 when fellow Hills Shire club Baulkham Hills Falcons entered the competition.

Pennant Hills won their first Premier Division Grand final in 2000, when the Demons defeated North Shore 15.12 (102) to 12.7 (79) at Macquarie University.

Their second was in 2006, at Henson Park. The Demons scored eight behinds in a row to defeat the previously undefeated East Coast Eagles by two points. With Pennant Hills scoring 5.20 (50) to East Coast's 7.6 (48)

The third flag in 2008 again came against East Coast Eagles, with a record 104-point win at Henson Park. With Pennant Hills scoring 20.12 (132) to East Coast's 3.10 (28)

The Demons won again in 2015 against the East Coast Eagles, Pennant Hills 14.5 (89) to East Coast Eagles 7.12 (54). This was the third time the two clubs had played off in the final game of the season, with all three being played at Henson Park and all three going the way of the demons.

The most recent premiership won by the club was in 2017. The Demons finished in 5th place on the ladder at the end of the regular season, with just seven wins over the sixteen games played. and are the first club to win from that position, taking out the match by 6 points at Blacktown International Sports park. Final score Sydney Uni 7.18 (60) to Pennant Hills 10.6 (66)

The Pennant Hills Demons Women's team first competed in the AFL Sydney Women's Premier Division in 2020.

Pennant Hills held its 50th anniversary celebrations in 2022, having been delayed one year by the COVID-19 pandemic, with over 200 players, former players, and supporters in attendence. Notably the club's founder and first Cpatain-Coach, Kerry James, was among those in attendence.

In 2027, Pennant Hills will compete alongside eight other AFL Syndey Premier Division teams in the Sydney Football League.

== Club identity and culture ==
=== Guernseys ===
The club's current home guernsey is based on the Melbourne Demons uniforms of blue with a red V, with blue shorts and red socks. On the Pennant Hills guernsey there is a red circle with the stylised letters PH in the middle. For away games the club wears a white shirt with a blue V and large red demon.

==== Uniform evolution ====
Pennant Hills; AFC (1971-1973)	Pennant Hills; Demons (1974–1998)	Pennant Hills; Demons (1999-present)

=== Theme Song ===
The Pennant Hills Demons song is identical to that of the Melbourne Demons and is sung to the tune of George M. Cohan's 1906 song "You're a Grand Old Flag":

It's a grand old flag, it's a high-flying flag,
It’s the emblem for me and for you,
It’s the emblem of the team we love,
The team of the red and the blue,
Every heart beats true for the red and the blue,
And we sing this song to you,
Should old acquaintance be forgot,
Keep your eye on the red and the blue.

=== Rivalries ===
Pennant Hills has rivalries with the East Coast Eagles and North Shore Bombers.

=== Warren "Pops" Quintrell Shield ===
Since the Baulkham Hills Falcons were promoted to the SFL in 1993, Pennant Hills have played against their cross town rivals for the Pops Quintrell Shield. The shield is named after Warren "Pops" Quintrell, who was instrumental in the founding of the Pennant Hills Demons, Baulkham Hills Falcons (now East Coast Eagles), and the junior team Kellyville/Rouse Hill Magpies.

== Club honours ==
Premierships
Competition	Level	Wins	Years won
AFL Sydney Men's	Premier Division	5	2000*, 2006, 2008, 2015, 2017
AFL Sydney Men's	Division One	2	1994, 1996
AFL Sydney Men's	Division Three	1	2008
AFL Sydney Women's	Division Two	1	2022
Finishing positions
AFL Sydney Men's; Premier Division	Minor premiership	1	2007
AFL Sydney Men's; Premier Division	Grand Finalist	6	1982, 1995, 1996, 1998, 2013, 2014
AFL Sydney Men's; Premier Division	Wooden spoons	1	1990
AFL Sydney Women's; Premier Division	Wooden spoons	1	2025

^{*} Despite being minor premiers, the Sydney Swans Reserves did not participate in the 2000 finals series. Pennant Hills finished 2nd on the ladder below the Swans that year.

== Individual honours ==
=== Phelan Medal winners ===
The Phelan Medal is awarded to the best player in the AFL Sydney Men's Premier Division during the home-and-away season as voted by the umpires:

- Mick Toy (1983)
- Gary Spillane (1988)
- Charlie Richardson (2007)
- Matthew Carey (2008)
- Kieran Wright (2011)
- Alex Goodall (2014)
- Ranga Ediriwickrama (2019)
- Stephen Wray (2022)
- Harry Maguire (2023)

=== AFL Players ===
The following Pennant Hills Demons players have played in or been drafted to the Australian Football League:

- Wes Smith – Hawthorn
- Pat Wellington – Essendon
- Terry Thripp – Sydney.
- David Brown – Sydney
- David Dighton – North Melbourne
- Stefan Carey – Sydney, Brisbane Lions
- Adam Chatfield – Carlton
- Lenny Hayes – St Kilda (2010 Norm Smith Medallist)
- Mark McVeigh – Essendon
- Jarrad McVeigh – Sydney
- Nick Potter – Sydney
- Kieren Jack – Sydney
- Scott Reed – Collingwood
- Blake McGrath – St Kilda
- Ranga Ediriwickrama – Geelong
- Jackson Ferguson – St Kilda
- Brandon Jack – Sydney
- Kieren Briggs – Greater Western Sydney, Richmond
- Mark Sheather – Sydney
- Braeden Campbell – Sydney
- James Peatling – Greater Western Sydney, Adelaide

== Seasons ==
Premiers	Grand Finalist	Minor premiers	Wooden spoon

=== AFL Sydney Men's Premier Division ===
Known as Sydney Football League until 1997, and Sydney AFL Premier Division from 1997–2009

Pennant Hills Demons – AFL Sydney Men's Premier Division seasons
Year	No.	P	W	D	L	%
1977	5th	21	10	1	10	91.42
1978	6th	21	8	0	13	92.34
1979	5th	20	8	1	11	87.97
1980	5th	21	10	0	11	105.87
1981	4th	21	14	0	7	142.21
1982	2nd	18	14	0	4	185.01
1983	6th	16	8	0	8	104.09
1984	3rd	16	11	0	5	117.38
1985	6th	18	8	0	10	106.81
1986	4th	17	11	0	6	150.40
1987	4th	18	11	0	7	115.03
1988	4th	19	13	0	6	137.30
1989	7th	14	2	0	12	58.24
1990	8th	16	2	0	14	50.14
1991	7th	18	5	0	13	61.56
1992	7th	17	5	2	10	74.37
1993	3rd	16	11	0	5	114.53
1994	6th	18	8	0	10	106.45
1995	2nd	18	12	0	6	144.67
1996	2nd	17	13	0	4	145.82
1997	6th	16	4	0	12	83.53
1998	2nd	15	10	0	5	138.84
1999	2nd	21	15	0	6	132.82
2000*	2nd	16	11	0	5	128.33
2001	3rd	16	10	0	6	123.21
2002	7th	16	4	0	12	73.40
2003	5th	17	8	1	8	91.45
2004	4th	18	11	0	7	107.10
2005	2nd	16	14	0	2	189.17
2006	3rd	16	10	0	6	146.79
2007	1st	18	15	0	3	172.88
2008	2nd	18	14	0	4	173.00
2009	4th	18	11	0	7	134.01
2010	5th	18	10	0	8	108.09
2011	5th	18	12	0	6	118.78
2012	3rd	18	15	0	3	177.41
2013	4th	18	13	0	5	150.21
2014	2nd	18	16	0	2	162.88
2015	3rd	16	12	1	3	129.62
2016	5th	16	9	0	7	115.41
2017	5th	16	7	2**	7	123.67
2018	6th	18	11	0	7	118.88
2019	5th	18	10	0	8	111.73
2020***	4th***	9***	5***	0***	4***	173.29***
2021***	5th***	10***	6***	0***	4***	114.74***
2022	6th	16	8	0	8	120.74
2023	3rd	16	11	0	5	129.68
2024	3rd	18	13	1	4	160.21
2025	6th	18	9	1	8	76.75
2026 (Ongoing)	2nd	7	6	0	1	195.31

Ongoing Seasons in italic text.
^{*} Despite being minor premiers, the Sydney Swans Reserves did not participate in the 2000 finals series.
^{**} Round 17, 2017 against Sydney University was abandoned due to a serious player injury at the start of the game, and was declared a draw.
^{***} The 2020 and 2021 seasons were affected by the COVID-19 pandemic in New South Wales

=== AFL Sydney Women's Premier Division ===
Pennant Hills Demons – AFL Sydney Women's Premier Division seasons
Year	No.	P	W	D	L	%
2020*	7th*	9*	2*	0*	7*	55.34*
2021*	9th*	10*	2*	0*	8*	66.88*
2022	7th	16	9	0	7	80.77
2023	7th	16	5	0	11	73.60
2024	8th	16	2	0	14	26.12
2025	9th	16	0	0	16	1.51
2026 (Ongoing)	9th	6	0	0	6	1.10

Ongoing Seasons in italic text.

^{*} The 2020 and 2021 seasons were affected by the COVID-19 pandemic in New South Wales
