= Jack Ashley (Australian footballer) =

Australian rules footballer

John Ashley
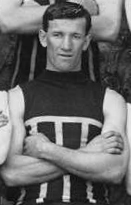

Personal information
- Full name: William John Ashley
- Nicknames: Jack, Spud
- Born: 14 May 1890; Fisherville, South Australia
- Died: 3 December 1968 (age 78); Sydney, New South Wales, Australia
- Original team: Balmain
- Positions: Follower, Ruck Shield

Playing career^{1}
Years	Club	Games (Goals)
1907–1909	Balmain	
1910–1911	East Sydney	
1912–1915	Port Adelaide	
1919	Port Adelaide	

Representative team honours
Years	Team	Games (Goals)
1911	New South Wales	4
1914-1919	South Australia	7
- ^{1} Playing statistics correct to the end of 1919.

Career highlights
- 1x Champions of Australia team member (1913); 2x Port Adelaide premiership player (1913, 1914); East Sydney premiership player (1911); Magarey Medal (1914); 2x Port Adelaide best and fairest (1914, 1919); NSWAFA best & fairest (1911)

William John Ashley (14 May 1890 – 3 December 1968) was an Australian rules footballer who played with Port Adelaide in the SAFL from 1912 to 1915 and 1919.

== Early life ==
He was born in South Australia in 1890 but moved to Sydney with his family early the next decade.

== Sydney football ==
Ashley was a star footballer in the local Sydney Australian rules football league with the Balmain Australian Football Club.

== 1911 Interstate carnival ==
He represented New South Wales at the inaugural state carnival.

== Port Adelaide ==
A follower, Ashley would later become a regular for South Australia at interstate level. He was a best and fairest winner at Port Adelaide in 1914 and also won that year's Magarey Medal. The war interrupted the SAFL but when it returned in 1919 so did Ashley and he won another best and fairest award before retiring at the end of the season.

== See also ==
- 1911 Adelaide Carnival
- 1914 Sydney Carnival
