= James Phelan (Australian rules football) =

James Edmond Phelan (born 1861 in Melbourne—died 15 November 1939 in Erskineville, New South Wales) was an Australian rules football player and club official. In Mebourne he played for the Hotham Football Club (Note: Hotham Football Club was a predeccessor of the North Melbourne football club.) described in his obituary as "now South Mebourne". After moving to Sydney, he played for the West Sydney Football Club. He founded the Newtown Football Club in 1903. He was a life member of the Australian National Football Council and the New South Wales Football League. The Phelan Medal was renamed in his honour in 1937.
