= Dave Elliman =

Australian rules footballer

David Elliman
- Elliman in May 1925

Personal information
- Full name: David William Elliman
- Born: 17 March 1902; Prahran, Victoria
- Died: 7 July 1995 (aged 93); Canberra, ACT
- Original teams: Malvern and Armadale Presbyterians
- Height: 173 cm (5 ft 8 in)
- Weight: 75 kg (165 lb)
- Positions: centre; forward

Playing career^{1}
Years	Club	Games (Goals)
1919	Melbourne	3 (0)
1921	Williamstown (VFA)	12 (2)
1922–24	Melbourne	17 (18)
1925	Hawthorn	3 (5)
1926–27	Camberwell (VFA)	30 (22)
1928–33	North Shore (Syd)	–
1933–34	Acton (ACT)	–
1935–40	Eastlake (ACT)	–

Representative team honours
Years	Team	Games (Goals)
1930	New South Wales	5 (0)
- ^{1} Playing statistics correct to the end of 1930.

David William Elliman, MBE (17 March 1902 – 7 July 1995) was an Australian rules footballer who played with Melbourne and Hawthorn in the Victorian Football League (VFL).

== Birth ==
The son of David William Elliman, Sr. (1877-1922) and Ethel May Ridoutt (1879-1962), David William Elliman was born on 17 March 1902 in Prahran, Victoria and raised in the inner eastern suburbs of Melbourne.

== Football ==
Having played the final three games for Melbourne during their winless 1919 VFL season, Elliman only played for the reserves in 1920 and was cleared to Victorian Football Association (VFA) side Williamstown in July 1921. Elliman played 11 games and kicked two goals for 'Town, including the 1921 premiership win over Footscray at Fitzroy's Brunswick Street Oval, where he played in the centre. He was cleared back to Melbourne at the start of the 1922 VFL season and made a further 17 appearances over the next three seasons. He joined Hawthorn for their first VFL season, playing forward pocket in their first VFL match, but only played a total of three matches for them. He moved to VFA side Camberwell at the start of 1926 season and played there for two years.

Transferred to Sydney as his company's New South Wales representative, he continued his football career, and in 1930 was captain and coach of the NSW Australian rules team at the 1930 Adelaide carnival. That year he won the Phelan Medal for the best and fairest player in the Sydney Australian rules football competition while playing for North Shore. He coached the ACT side at the 1933 Sydney carnival and decided to stay in Canberra and joined the staff of the then Department of the Interior.

== World War II ==
When World War II broke out he enlisted in the Australian Imperial Force and became a member of the 2/15 Field Company. He served in Syria during the fighting in June and July 1941. With the entry of Japan into the war in December 1941, Elliman returned to Australia with his unit and served in the Darwin area. Later service saw him in the 1945 Borneo campaign.

== Post War Career ==
Upon his return from the war, Elliman married Gwenda Elsie May in 1948. He also became prominent in business in Canberra, establishing Canberra Wholesalers Pty Ltd in 1949 to handle builders' supplies and hardware, and managing it until it was taken over by interstate interests in the 1960's.

Elliman also played an active part in Returned and Services League of Australia (RSL) affairs, serving as president of Barton sub-branch in the 1950s and then as president of the ACT branch from 1959 to 1973. In 1964 he was awarded life membership of the RSL. He played a leading part in the establishment of the Sir Leslie Morshead War Veterans' Home in Lyneham, serving as inaugural president of the board of management from 1961 until he retired in 1973. For his extended work on the welfare of former service personnel and other activities in the community, he was appointed a Member of the Order of the British Empire in 1966. In 1984 he was awarded the Meritorious Medal, the highest award of the RSL, in recognition of his sustained service and interest in ex-service matters over many years.

== Death ==
David Elliman died in Canberra in 1995, aged 93. A street in the suburb of Gungahlin, Australian Capital Territory was named after him in 2002.
