= Troy Luff =

Australian rules footballer, born 1969

Personal information
- Full name: Troy Luff
- Born: 22 November 1969 (age 56)
- Original team: Nelson Bay
- Height: 191 cm (6 ft 3 in)
- Weight: 93 kg (205 lb)

Playing career^{1}
| Years | Club | Games (Goals) |
| 1990–2001 | Sydney Swans | 155 (85) |
- ^{1} Playing statistics correct to the end of 2001.

Career highlights
- Troy Luff kicked 6 goals in a big win over South West Sydney Blues at age 55 in Sydney AFL Division 5 competition. Luff also kicked a career-high 11 goals over Sydney University in Round 17 of the same year and finished as the division's leading goalkicker.

Troy Luff (born 22 November 1969) is a former Australian rules footballer for the Sydney Swans of the Australian Football League.

== Football career ==
Troy Luff grew up in the town of Traralgon, Victoria, where he lived until high school age. He played junior football with the Cumberland Park Club before shifting with his family to Nelson Bay, New South Wales. In 1989 with 70 goals he was the leading goalkicker in the Newcastle AFL for Nelson Bay.

In his early career, Luff was delisted and re-drafted twice before the age of 26, and was considered again at the start of his breakout year, 1996, by coach Rodney Eade

=== 1996 season ===
Luff was retained, where he became best known for his stand-out performances in the 1996 AFL Finals series, culminating in a near best on ground effort in the 1996 AFL Grand Final with 2 crucial goals in the losing side, where he soundly beat Wayne Schwass (although was later beaten by Glenn Archer). Luff also suffered from Epstein Barr virus.

=== Later career ===
The tall, lean Luff managed to hold down his ruck position during his career, playing a total of 155 games and kicking 85 goals in a career spanning from 1990 to 2001.

== Post-AFL career ==
Luff joined Balmain and won a Phelan medal and club best and fairest in 2002. He later became coach and player of UNSW-Eastern Suburbs Bulldogs and went on to win a second Phelan Medal in 2006. Luff returned to play for Balmain, and then back to UNSW-ES where he won his first Grand Final in his 551st game played in 2019.

Luff also commentates for Triple M Sydney's AFL coverage and is a regular on Weekend Sunrise and Fox Sports News
