= Western magpies =

Western Magpies may refer to:

== Sports clubs ==
- Western Suburbs Magpies, a NSWRL Premier League club
- Western Magpies Australian Football Club, an AFL Queensland State League club
- Western Suburbs Magpies AFC, Australian rules football club in Sydney

== Birds ==
- Western magpie, Gymnorhina tibicen dorsalis, subspecies of the Australian magpie
