= Chris Oliver (footballer) =

Australian rules footballer (born 1982)

Personal information
- Full name: Chris Oliver
- Born: 9 July 1982 (age 44)
- Original team: Campbelltown / NSW/ACT Rams
- Height: 195 cm (6 ft 5 in)
- Weight: 120 kg (265 lb)

Playing career^{1}
Years	Club	Games (Goals)
2001–2003	St Kilda	10 (1)
- ^{1} Playing statistics correct to the end of 2003.

Chris Oliver (born 9 July 1982) is an Australian rules footballer who played with St Kilda in the Australian Football League (AFL).

== Early years ==
Oliver attended St Gregory's College as a teenager, but completed his schooling at Erindale College in Canberra. He played representative football for the NSW/ACT Rams.

== AFL career ==
A ruckman, he spent a pre-season with Fremantle, prior to being recruited by St Kilda, as a rookie. He made 10 appearances for St Kilda over three seasons, never playing more than two games in a row. Instead he spent much of his time playing for Springvale in the Victorian Football League.

== Post AFL ==
Oliver was delisted at the end of the 2003 season. He spent the next stage of his career with South Australian National Football League (SANFL) club Sturt, followed by a stint with Frankston in the Victorian Football League (VFL). He was at Corowa-Rutherglen in 2010, St Albans in 2011 and joined Numurkah in 2012.
