= South West Sydney Blues AFC =

AFL club (Australian rules football)

South West Sydney Blues

Names
- Full name: South West Sydney Blues Australian Football Club
- Nickname: Blues
- Club song: The famous navy blue and white.

AFL Sydney Men's Premier Division 2026 season
- Home-and-away season: 3rd

Club details
- Founded: 2022; 4 years ago
- Colours: Navy Blue and White
- President: Shannon Prenter
- Captain: Kerwin Stuart
- Ground: Rosedale Oval; Bob Prenter Reserve

Uniforms
Home	Away

Other information
- Official website: https://www.southwestsydneyblues.com.au/

South West Sydney Blues Australian Football Club is an Australian rules football club competing in AFL Sydney.

== History ==
The club was created in 2022, following a merger between the South West Sydney Magpies and Campbelltown Blues. Since 2024 the club has competed in AFL Sydney Men's Premier Division.

During Sir Doug Nicholls Round the club wears an Indigenous gurnsey designed by their captain, Kerwin Stuart, who has Yamatji and Adnyamathanha heritage.

During round 11 2025 former Richmond stars Brandon Ellis and Trent Cotchin played a one-off special appearance game against the Pennant Hills Demons. The Blues won the game scoring (21.7.133) against the Demons's (10.5.65). Trent Cotchin's two goals would mark the first time a Brownlow Medalist scored a goal in the AFL Sydney.

The club currently fields a Women's Division 1 team, and plans to field an AFL Sydney Women's Premier Division team by 2027.

In 2027 the Blues will compete alongside eight other AFL Syndey Premier Division teams in the Sydney Football League.

== Individual honours ==
=== Phelan Medal winners ===
The Phelan Medal is awarded to the best player in the AFL Sydney Men's Premier Division during the home-and-away season as voted by the umpires:

- Finbar Delbridge (2025)

=== AFL Players ===
The following South West Sydney Blues players have played in the Australian Football League:

- Caleb May (Western Bulldogs)

== Seasons ==
Premiers	Grand Finalist	Minor premiers	Wooden spoon

=== AFL Sydney Men's Premier Division ===
South West Sydney Blues AFL Sydney Men's Premier Division seasons
Year	No.	P	W	D	L	%
2024	6th	18	7	0	11	79.64
2025	5th	18	10	0	8	110.22
2026	3rd	18	13	0	5	188.13
