= Terry Ingersoll =

Australian rules footballer (1934–2020)

Personal information
- Full name: Terence John Ingersoll
- Born: 18 August 1934
- Died: 29 September 2020 (aged 86)
- Original team: Western Suburbs
- Height: 188 cm (6 ft 2 in)
- Weight: 88 kg (194 lb)

Playing career^{1}
| Years | Club | Games (Goals) |
| 1957–1958 | Hawthorn | 17 (36) |
- ^{1} Playing statistics correct to the end of 1958.

Terence John Ingersoll (18 August 1934 – 29 September 2020) was an Australian rules footballer who played with Hawthorn in the Victorian Football League (VFL).

== Career ==
Ingersoll, a full-forward, had a prolific season for Western Suburbs in 1956, breaking the NSW Australian Football Association record for most goals in a year. He kicked 101 goals in the home and away season, which included 15 and 17 goal hauls in successive weeks, against Balmain and St George respectively.

He wrote his name into the record books again at Hawthorn, when he kicked a club record five goals on debut, in the opening round of the season, against Carlton at Princes Park. By the end of the season he had kicked 33 goals, topping Hawthorn's goal-kicking and winning their "Best First Year Player" award. He struggled for form in 1958 and was confined to the reserves for much of the year, before a family illness caused him to return to Sydney.
