= Bill Thripp =

Australian rules footballer

Personal information
- Full name: William Thripp
- Born: 26 January 1940
- Died: 15 February 2007 (aged 67)
- Original team: Richmond Scouts
- Height: 183 cm (6 ft 0 in)
- Weight: 86 kg (190 lb)

Playing career^{1}
Years	Club	Games (Goals)
1959–1962	Collingwood	46 (4)
- ^{1} Playing statistics correct to the end of 1962.

Bill Thripp (26 January 1940 – 15 February 2007) was an Australian rules footballer who played for Collingwood in the Victorian Football League (VFL).

Thripp, the father of Sydney utility Terry, was recruited from Richmond Scouts. He played as a centre half back in the Collingwood team which lost the 1960 VFL Grand Final.

He later coached the Warners Bay Bulldogs in the Newcastle Australian Football League and steered them to a maiden premiership in 1984, going through the entire season undefeated.
