= Pat Wellington =

Australian rules footballer

Personal information
- Full name: Pat J. Wellington
- Born: 29 July 1953
- Died: 12 July 1987 (aged 33)
- Original team: Hopetoun
- Height: 185 cm (6 ft 1 in)
- Weight: 82 kg (181 lb)
- Position: Forward

Playing career^{1}
Years	Club	Games (Goals)
1972–1976	Essendon	58 (42)
- ^{1} Playing statistics correct to the end of 1976.

Pat J. Wellington (29 July 1953 – 12 July 1987) was an Australian rules footballer who played with Essendon in the Victorian Football League (VFL) during the 1970s.

Wellington played as a forward and was recruited to the Des Tuddenham led Essendon from Hopetoun. Known for his high flying marks, he kicked 21 goals in 1973, five of those in a win over Footscray at Western Oval.

With his VFL career ending in 1976, Wellington continued his football career at VFA club Yarraville in 1977. He then moved to Pennant Hills in Sydney before heading further north to Queensland and joining Southport. Wellington also captain-coached Kedron and played at Beenleigh.

On 12 July 1987, Wellington died of cancer at the age of 33.
