= Josaia Delana =

Personal information
- Nickname: Joey
- Born: 1 July 2006 (age 20)
- Original teams: Greater Western Sydney (VFL); East Coast Eagles (AFL Sydney)
- Draft: Category B rookie selection
- Debut: Round 8, 2025, Greater Western Sydney vs. Sydney, at Sydney Cricket Ground
- Height: 176 cm (5 ft 9 in)
- Weight: 78 kg (172 lb)
- Position: Medium forward

Club information
- Current club: Greater Western Sydney
- Number: 38

Playing career^{1}
Years	Club	Games (Goals)
2025–	Greater Western Sydney (AFL)	12 (1)
- ^{1} Playing statistics correct to the end of 2026.

Josaia Delana (born 1 July 2006) is an Australian rules footballer playing for the Greater Western Sydney Giants in the Australian Football League (AFL).

== Early life and career ==
Delana comes from a multicultural family of western Sydney, with his father born in Fiji and his mother a local from Blacktown. In his youth, Delana played association football for the Blacktown Spartans and rugby league for the Kellyville Bushrangers and the Hills District Bulls. Despite a strong junior career in league, he switched to junior Australian rules football and played for the East Coast Eagles in AFL Sydney before joining the Academy program of the GWS Giants. He then represented the Giants' reserves team in the Victorian Football League (VFL).

Delana's switch from rugby league to Australian rules at the age of 13 was inspired by former Greater Western Sydney player Israel Folau. Delana represented the Allies on four occasions during his junior football career.

He was elevated to a position in the club's senior AFL team through a Category B rookie selection in 2024.

== AFL career ==
Delana made his debut for the Giants in the round 8 Sydney Derby against the Sydney Swans. He extended his one-year contract following three games in his debut season.

== Personal life ==
Josaia has a younger brother named Rai who has aspirations of becoming a professional athlete. Their father, Josaia Sr., played rugby league in the Parramatta Junior Rugby League as well as for South Sydney's reserves team and for the Montpellier Red Devils in France.

== Statistics ==
Updated to the end of round 22, 2026.

Legend
G	Goals	K	Kicks	D	Disposals	T	Tackles
B	Behinds	H	Handballs	M	Marks

Season	Team	No.	Games	Totals							Averages (per game)							Votes
Season	Team	No.	Games	G	B	K	H	D	M	T	G	B	K	H	D	M	T	Votes
2025	Greater Western Sydney	38	3	0	2	9	6	15	3	9	0.0	0.7	3.0	2.0	5.0	1.0	3.0	0
2026	Greater Western Sydney	38	7	1	4	34	25	59	7	26	0.1	0.6	4.9	3.6	8.4	1.0	3.7	0
Career			10	1	6	43	31	74	10	35	0.1	0.6	4.3	3.1	7.4	1.0	3.5	0
