= Barry Toy =

Australian rules footballer

Personal information
- Full name: Barry Toy
- Born: 20 April 1939 (age 87)
- Original team: Bunyip
- Height: 175 cm (5 ft 9 in)
- Weight: 73 kg (161 lb)

Playing career^{1}
Years	Club	Games (Goals)
1959–1960	Hawthorn	9 (1)
- ^{1} Playing statistics correct to the end of 1960.

Barry Toy (born 20 April 1939) is a former Australian rules footballer who played for the Hawthorn Football Club in the Victorian Football League (VFL).

Toy played on the wing during his career with Hawthorn in the VFL.

After his VFL career Toy coached Strathmerton Football Club in 1963, and was instrumental in the foundaton of the Baulkham Hills Australian Football Club in 1976.
