= Dane Rampe =

Australian rules footballer (born 1990)

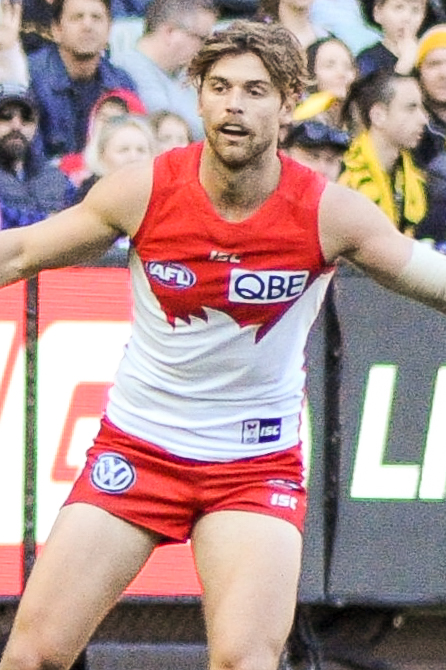
- Rampe playing for Sydney in June 2017

Personal information
- Full name: Dane Rampe
- Nickname: Ramps
- Born: 2 June 1990 (age 36); Sydney, New South Wales
- Original team: UNSW-Eastern Suburbs (AFL Sydney)
- Draft: No. 37, 2013 rookie draft
- Height: 188 cm (6 ft 2 in)
- Weight: 91 kg (201 lb)
- Position: Key defender

Playing career^{1}
Years	Club	Games (Goals)
2013–2026	Sydney	289 (9)
- ^{1} Playing statistics correct to the end of 2026.

Career highlights
- Sydney Swans co-captain (2019–2023); All-Australian team (2016); Bob Skilton Medal (2019); Robert Rose Award (2020)

Dane Rampe (/ˈræmpi/ RAM-pee; born 2 June 1990) is a former Australian rules footballer who played for the Sydney Swans in the Australian Football League (AFL). He previously served as co-captain of the Swans from 2019 until the end of the 2023 season.

== Early life ==
Rampe was born in Sydney and grew up in Clovelly, New South Wales. His grandparents and father had migrated to Sydney from Estonia. Rampe grew up near to the SCG and attended the Sydney Swans v Collingwood match in which Tony Lockett kicked his record-breaking 1,300th AFL goal as one of the hundreds who flooded the field when it occurred. He credits this event as converting him in to a passionate Swans fan. Following this he became a regular at matches and idolised Brett Kirk, Adam Goodes and Jude Bolton. The Swans-West Coast Eagles rivalry also inspired an intense passion for AFL.

Rampe was educated at Newington College in Stanmore where he played basketball and soccer. An obvious athletic talent, his school asked him to switch from soccer to rugby union at age 17. He first played in the AFL Sydney Premier Division for the UNSW-Eastern Suburbs Bulldogs in 2007.

Determined to make a career out of the sport Rampe nominated for the AFL draft, but after being overlooked, he moved to Melbourne before the start of the 2009 VFL season to attempt to gain entry to the league through the Victorian Football League (VFL). He spent three seasons in the VFL with Williamstown helping them win the inaugural Foxtel Cup and playing in the 2011 VFL Grand Final. He was twice invited to train with the Western Bulldogs in the preseason. The Bulldogs, however, passed him over in the 2010 AFL draft.

Feeling he had missed his chance to break into the AFL he returned to Sydney, where he again played in the AFL Sydney Premier Division with the UNSW-Eastern Suburbs Bulldogs. At the end of the 2012 AFL Sydney Premier Division season he won the Phelan Medal (Best and Fairest). He was soon noticed by AFL talent scouts and signed on to the Sydney Swans Academy.

== AFL career ==
Rampe made his debut for the Swans in 2013 and went on to play 23 games in that season. His standout game was in Round 11 against the Adelaide Crows where he had 18 disposals (11 kicks, 7 handballs) along with 4 marks and 4 tackles in his sides impressive 127 to 50 victory. In 2016, he was named All-Australian.

In March 2017, Rampe injured himself while out jogging. He fell and broke his arm. On 24 May 2017, it was announced that he would wear number 50 on his guernsey, rather than his usual 24, for the round 10 Sir Doug Nicholls Indigenous Round game against Hawthorn. This was to commemorate the 50th anniversary of the 1967 referendum, which allowed Indigenous Australians to be counted with the general population in the census.

Rampe had an outstanding 2019 season, albeit not without some controversy. He was appointed co-captain alongside Josh Kennedy and Luke Parker prior to the season, and he won his first best-and-fairest award for the Swans after playing all but one match for the year. He gained notoriety during the year when he jumped onto a goalpost after the Round 8 match against Essendon to stop David Myers from trying to kick a goal after the siren. He was fined A$1,000 for his stunt, and A$10,000 for saying "You talk like a little girl" to the umpire.

In 2020, Rampe had another excellent year in defence, although impeded significantly with a broken hand sustained in Rd 8 against Hawthorn. Remarkably he had continued to play another four games with the injury, before further damage led to a premature end to his season. His courage over continuing to play with the injury lead to him being awarded the Robert Rose Award for Most Courageous Player at the end of the season.

In the 2024 AFL Grand Final, following the injury of Swans captain Callum Mills, Rampe was selected to stand in as captain for the Swans. In 2026, with Mills injured again, Rampe was selected to captain the Swans for the Preliminary Final against Fremantle.

Rampe announced his retirement from AFL on 30 October 2026, after playing 14 seasons for the Sydney Swans.

== Statistics ==
Updated to the end of round 22, 2026.

Legend
G	Goals	K	Kicks	D	Disposals	T	Tackles
B	Behinds	H	Handballs	M	Marks

Season	Team	No.	Games	Totals							Averages (per game)							Votes
Season	Team	No.	Games	G	B	K	H	D	M	T	G	B	K	H	D	M	T	Votes
2013	Sydney	43	23	1	2	205	95	300	67	60	0.0	0.1	8.9	4.1	13.0	2.9	2.6	0
2014	Sydney	24	25	3	2	245	152	397	93	76	0.1	0.1	9.8	6.1	15.9	3.7	3.0	0
2015	Sydney	24	24	1	3	284	172	456	137	60	0.0	0.1	11.8	7.2	19.0	5.7	2.5	0
2016	Sydney	24	26	1	2	303	175	478	141	63	0.0	0.1	11.7	6.7	18.4	5.4	2.4	2
2017	Sydney	24/50	17	0	1	165	117	282	99	32	0.0	0.1	9.7	6.9	16.6	5.8	1.9	2
2018	Sydney	24	23	0	1	231	155	386	123	55	0.0	0.0	10.0	6.7	16.8	5.3	2.4	1
2019	Sydney	24	21	0	1	265	155	420	123	60	0.0	0.0	12.6	7.4	20.0	5.9	2.9	0
2020 (Note: The 2020 season was played with 17 home-and-away matches per team (down from 22) and 16-minute quarters with time on (down from 20-minute quarters with time on) due to the impact of the COVID-19 pandemic.)	Sydney	24	11	0	0	105	55	160	42	15	0.0	0.0	9.5	5.0	14.5	3.8	1.4	1
2021	Sydney	24	20	0	1	248	113	361	123	34	0.0	0.1	12.4	5.7	18.1	6.2	1.7	0
2022	Sydney	24	25	1	0	223	99	322	118	49	0.0	0.0	8.9	4.0	12.9	4.7	2.0	0
2023	Sydney	24	15	0	0	140	93	233	62	33	0.0	0.0	9.3	6.2	15.5	4.1	2.2	1
2024	Sydney	24	21	2	0	176	61	237	95	29	0.1	0.0	8.4	2.9	11.3	4.5	1.4	0
2025	Sydney	24	21	0	0	191	90	281	91	47	0.0	0.0	9.1	4.3	13.4	4.3	2.2	0
2026	Sydney	24	13	0	0	85	92	177	33	22	0.0	0.0	6.5	7.1	13.6	2.5	1.7	0
Career			285	9	13	2866	1624	4490	1347	635	0.0	0.0	10.1	5.7	15.8	4.7	2.2	7

== Honours and achievements ==
Team

- 3× Minor Premiership (Sydney): 2014, 2016, 2024

Individual

- Sydney captain: 2019–
- Bob Skilton Medal: 2019
- All-Australian team: 2016
