= Phil Bradmore =

Australian rules footballer

Personal information
- Full name: Phil Bradmore
- Born: 2 April 1959 (age 67)
- Original team: North Shore
- Height: 189 cm (6 ft 2 in)
- Weight: 89 kg (196 lb)
- Position: Key position

Playing career^{1}
Years	Club	Games (Goals)
1978–81	Footscray	15 (17)
1981–88	West Perth	139
- ^{1} Playing statistics correct to the end of 1988.

Phil Bradmore (born 2 April 1959) is a former Australian rules footballer who played for Footscray in the Victorian Football League (VFL).

Bradmore was recruited to the VFL from Sydney club North Shore and spent most of his time in the Footscray reserves. A key position player, he played at West Perth for the rest of the 1980s. He won the Breckler Medal, West Perth's 'fairest and best' award, in 1985. Also that year, he represented Western Australian in an interstate match against South Australia at Subiaco. Bradmore also made interstate appearances for New South Wales in the 1988 Adelaide Bicentennial Carnival. In 2015 he played a year of senior football for the Grafton Tigers playing 14 games in the NCFL.
