= Craig McGrath (Australian footballer) =

Australian rules footballer

Personal information
- Full name: Craig McGrath
- Born: 9 October 1963 (age 63)
- Original team: Banyule
- Height: 190 cm (6 ft 3 in)
- Weight: 88 kg (194 lb)

Playing career^{1}
Years	Club	Games (Goals)
1984–1989	Fitzroy	58 (42)
1990–1991	West Coast Eagles	15 (13)
Total		73 (55)
- ^{1} Playing statistics correct to the end of 1991.

Craig McGrath (born 9 October 1963) is a former Australian rules footballer who played with Fitzroy and the West Coast Eagles in the Victorian/Australian Football League (VFL/AFL).

From Banyule, McGrath starred in and captained Fitzroy's 1982 Under 19's premiership team. He played his first senior game for Fitzroy in 1984 but had his breakthrough season in 1986 when he made 16 appearances. They included Fitzroy's finals campaign which ended with a preliminary final loss to Hawthorn, when McGrath had 14 disposals. A centre half-forward, he was let go by Fitzroy at the end of the 1989 season to ease salary cap pressure and was picked up by the West Coast with the fourth selection of the 1990 preseason draft.

McGrath, who was used in the ruck on occasions, played in the second half of the 1990 season for the Eagles, including the drawn and replayed qualifying finals. During the year he represented Western Australia in an interstate match against South Australia at Football Park. He played just one further AFL season before being delisted but continued in the WAFL, where he played with East Perth and then Perth.

Following his WAFL career, McGrath would go on to coach the Baulkham Hills Falcons in the Sydney Football League in 1998.
