= Ingrid Nielsen =

Australian rules footballer (born 1991)

Personal information
- Born: 27 November 1991 (age 34)
- Original team: UNSW-ES Bulldogs (AFL Sydney)
- Draft: No. 60, 2018 national draft
- Debut: Round 4, 2019, Greater Western Sydney vs. Collingwood, at Morwell Recreation Reserve
- Height: 184 cm (6 ft 0 in)
- Position: Ruck
- Other occupation: Paramedic

Playing career^{1}
Years	Club	Games (Goals)
2019–2020	Greater Western Sydney	7 (0)
- ^{1} Playing statistics correct to the end of the 2020 season.

Ingrid Nielsen (born 27 November 1991) is an Australian rules footballer who played for Greater Western Sydney in the AFL Women's (AFLW).

== State football ==
From Tasmania, Nielsen played for the UNSW-Eastern Suburbs Bulldogs in their victorious 2018 season in the AFL Sydney, kicking 10 goals in 17 games.

== AFLW career ==
Nielsen was recruited by Greater Western Sydney with pick 60 in the 2018 AFLW national draft and was expected to play as a back-up ruck for Erin McKinnon. Nielsen debuted in round 4 of the 2019 season against Collingwood when McKinnon was a late withdrawal after falling ill. In August 2020, Nielsen retired from football to focus on her paramedic career.

== Personal life ==
Outside of football, Nielsen is a paramedic.
