= Jackson Ferguson =

Australian rules footballer

Personal information
- Full name: Jackson Ferguson
- Born: 23 October 1992 (age 34)
- Original team: Pennant Hills (Sydney AFL)
- Draft: No. 72, 2011 rookie draft
- Height: 194 cm (6 ft 4 in)
- Weight: 89 kg (196 lb)

Playing career^{1}
Years	Club	Games (Goals)
2011–2013	St Kilda	1 (0)
- ^{1} Playing statistics correct to the end of 2013.

Jackson Ferguson (born 23 October 1992) is a former professional Australian rules footballer who played for the St Kilda Football Club in the Australian Football League (AFL). He was recruited by the club in the 2011 rookie draft with pick 72. Ferguson made his debut in round 10, 2013, against North Melbourne at Etihad Stadium. He was delisted at the conclusion of the 2013 season.
