= Ray Hall (Australian footballer) =

Australian rules footballer

Personal information
- Born: 27 October 1980 (age 46)
- Original team: Woy Woy/NSW/ACT Under 18s
- Debut: Round 22, 27 August 1999, Richmond vs. Carlton, at Melbourne Cricket Ground
- Height: 196 cm (6 ft 5 in)
- Weight: 96 kg (212 lb)

Playing career^{1}
| Years | Club | Games (Goals) |
| 1999–2007 | Richmond | 99 (28) |
- ^{1} Playing statistics correct to the end of 2007.

Ray Hall (born 27 October 1980) is a former Australian rules football player who played for the Richmond Football Club.

Hall grew up in New South Wales, playing for the Balmain Australian Football Club before moving to Woy Woy where he was recruited by the Tigers having played in the Under 18s state squad. Hall played 99 games for the Richmond Tigers, predominantly as a ruckman.

Hall announced his retirement on 28 August 2007 because a hip injury ruled him out for the 2007 season.

In 2008, Hall spent 12 months as an Australian Government sponsored volunteer in Papua New Guinea, on the Australian Youth Ambassadors for Development (AYAD) program, assisting in sports development in PNG. This has included coaching PNG's Under 18 Australian Rules Football League (AFL) Team, the Kupundas.

Hall returned to Australia in 2010 to join the Department of the Treasury (Australia) as a graduate. In 2012, Hall joined the Department of Foreign Affairs and Trade (Australia). He was first posted to Afghanistan, followed by Jordan where he also played for the Amman Saracens at the Emirates Airlines Dubai Rugby Sevens in 2014 and 2015. Hall was subsequently posted to the Solomon Islands in 2018.

== Statistics ==
Legend
| G | Goals | K | Kicks | D | Disposals | T | Tackles |
| B | Behinds | H | Handballs | M | Marks | H/O | Hit-outs |

| Season | Team | No. | Games | Totals | | | | | | | | Averages (per game) | | | | | | | | Votes |
| Season | Team | No. | Games | G | B | K | H | D | M | T | H/O | G | B | K | H | D | M | T | H/O | Votes |
|---|---|---|---|---|---|---|---|---|---|---|---|---|---|---|---|---|---|---|---|---|
| 1999 | Richmond | 37 | 1 | 0 | 0 | 0 | 0 | 0 | 0 | 0 | 0 | 0.0 | 0.0 | 0.0 | 0.0 | 0.0 | 0.0 | 0.0 | 0.0 | 0 |
| 2000 | Richmond | 37 | 0 | – | – | – | – | – | – | – | – | – | – | – | – | – | – | – | – | —N/a |
| 2001 | Richmond | 20 | 17 | 8 | 1 | 62 | 59 | 121 | 41 | 22 | 30 | 0.5 | 0.1 | 3.6 | 3.5 | 7.1 | 2.4 | 1.3 | 1.8 | 0 |
| 2002 | Richmond | 20 | 20 | 10 | 8 | 117 | 94 | 211 | 68 | 55 | 62 | 0.5 | 0.4 | 5.9 | 4.7 | 10.6 | 3.4 | 2.8 | 3.1 | 3 |
| 2003 | Richmond | 20 | 9 | 3 | 5 | 59 | 38 | 97 | 26 | 32 | 57 | 0.3 | 0.6 | 6.6 | 4.2 | 10.8 | 2.9 | 3.6 | 6.3 | 0 |
| 2004 | Richmond | 20 | 22 | 4 | 2 | 105 | 111 | 216 | 67 | 30 | 42 | 0.2 | 0.1 | 4.8 | 5.0 | 9.8 | 3.0 | 1.4 | 1.9 | 0 |
| 2005 | Richmond | 20 | 17 | 3 | 1 | 89 | 116 | 205 | 62 | 33 | 9 | 0.2 | 0.1 | 5.2 | 6.8 | 12.1 | 3.6 | 1.9 | 0.5 | 1 |
| 2006 | Richmond | 20 | 13 | 0 | 0 | 85 | 88 | 173 | 76 | 28 | 1 | 0.0 | 0.0 | 6.5 | 6.8 | 13.3 | 5.8 | 2.2 | 0.1 | 0 |
| 2007 | Richmond | 20 | 0 | – | – | – | – | – | – | – | – | – | – | – | – | – | – | – | – | —N/a |
| Career | | | 99 | 28 | 17 | 517 | 506 | 1023 | 340 | 200 | 201 | 0.3 | 0.2 | 5.2 | 5.1 | 10.3 | 3.4 | 2.0 | 2.0 | 4 |
