= David Brown (footballer, born 1967) =

Australian rules footballer

Personal information
- Full name: David W. Brown
- Born: 16 August 1967 (age 59)
- Original team: Pennant Hills
- Height: 192 cm (6 ft 4 in)
- Weight: 90 kg (198 lb)

Playing career^{1}
Years	Club	Games (Goals)
1988–1990	Sydney Swans	12 (18)
- ^{1} Playing statistics correct to the end of 1990.

David Brown (born 16 August 1967) is a former Australian rules footballer who played with the Sydney Swans in the Victorian/Australian Football League (VFL/AFL).

Brown, recruited from Pennant Hills, was tried at full-forward by Sydney in 1988, to fill the vacancy left by Warwick Capper's move to the Brisbane Bears. He had a promising start to his league career, before being struck by injury. On debut he kicked four goals, in Sydney's three point win over Geelong at Kardinia Park, a result which was only secured when Robert Scott hit the post from a set shot after the final siren. He kicked 10 more goals in his next three games, then during the first quarter of his fifth league appearance, against Essendon at the Sydney Cricket Ground, Brown snapped the anterior cruciate ligament in his right knee. Returning in 1989, after a knee reconstruction, Brown made five appearances, without making an impact, then just two in 1990.
