= Mark Maclure =

Australian rules footballer

Personal information
- Nickname: Sellers
- Born: 14 July 1955 (age 71); Perth, Western Australia
- Original team: East Sydney
- Debut: Round 13, 1974, Carlton vs. Geelong, at Princes Park
- Height: 188 cm (6 ft 2 in)
- Weight: 92 kg (203 lb)

Playing career^{1}
Years	Club	Games (Goals)
1974–1986	Carlton	243 (327)
- ^{1} Playing statistics correct to the end of 1986.

Career highlights
- Carlton premiership player 1979, 1981 & 1982; 1974 5th Reserves Best & Fairest won on countback; 1974 Mrs Jean Cook Most Improved Reserve Player Award; 1975 10th Best & Fairest; 1976 Equal 9th Best & Fairest; 1977 4th Best & Fairest; 1978 Arthur Reyment Memorial Trophy -2nd Best & Fairest; 1979 4th Best & Fairest; 1981 Best Clubman Award; 1984 3rd Best & Fairest; 1985 3rd Best & Fairest; 1985 Best Clubman Award; 1986 Carlton captain

Mark Maclure (born 14 July 1955) is a former Australian rules footballer in the Victorian Football League (VFL).

Originally from New South Wales club East Sydney, Maclure was recruited by Carlton and made his senior VFL debut in Round 13, 1974. He retired from the game in 1986 after playing 243 games for the club.

Maclure was captain of Carlton for the 1986 season. He currently works as a football commentator for ABC Radio and appears once a week on AFL 360, Fox Footy's Monday to Thursday television program.

== Early life ==
Maclure was born in Perth, Western Australia where he began playing football in the under 10s for Manning Park. His family was to move to Brisbane, Queensland where he played junior football with the Coorparoo Football Club.

In 1967 the family moved to Paddington in Sydney. Trumper Park was nearby and he began playing senior football with East Sydney. In 1973 he was recruited by Victorian Football League club Carlton.
