= University of New South Wales Australian National Football Club =

UNSW-ANFC

Names
- Full name: University of New South Wales Australian National Football Club
- Nickname: Whalies

Club details
- Founded: 22 March 1962; 64 years ago
- Dissolved: 1999; 27 years ago
- Competition: Sydney Football Association

The University of New South Wales Australian National Football Club played Australian rules football.

== History ==
The University of New South Wales Australian National Football Club (UNSW-ANFC), also known as “the Whalies”, was formed on 22 March 1962 to participate in the Australian University Games, but it wasn’t until the following year that the club actually fielded a team.

In 1964 the club started regular local competition. And while they combined with Sydney University during their first regular season, the two universities also quickly developed a strong rivalry. UNSW were victorious in their inaugural clash and took home a perpetual trophy donated by Shell.

The club won its first premiership in 1966, when they won the Second Grade Premiership in the Sydney First Divsion. They appeared in four consecutive grand finals, and won the 1968 premiership by 97 points. The following year the club was promoted a division and continued to win. From 1971 the club won five more first grade premierships (the last in 1994) and nine reserve grade premierships (the last in 1996). The club continued to appear regularly in grand finals up until the merger with the Eastern Suburbs Australian Football Club in 1999.

In the University Games the club did not do as well. The club’s only medal was won in 1995 after defeating Monash University in Darwin, Northern Territory for the bronze.

In 1985, the club set an Australian record for the highest score recorded by a senior grade team in an Australian National Football game with a score of 69.32 (446) - 0.0 (0) against Baulkham Hills. The record was subsequently beaten, however the club holds the New South Wales record with a score of 81.49 (535) to 0.1 (1) against Blacktown in 1994.

Since the 1999 merger the club became known as the UNSW-Eastern Suburbs Bulldogs.

== Individual Honours ==
=== Sanders Medal winners ===
The Sanders Medal was awarded to the best player in the Sydney Football League Reserves Grade, now known as the AFL Sydney Men's Division One, during the home-and-away season as voted by the umpires:

- Cliff Matson (1966)
