= Jack Williamson (footballer) =

Australian rules footballer (1907–1965)

"Jack" Williamson

Personal information
- Full name: Albert John Williamson
- Born: 20 May 1907; Woori Yallock
- Died: 14 August 1965 (aged 58); Melbourne
- Original team: Woori Yallock

Playing career^{1}
Years	Club	Games (Goals)
1926	Carlton	1 (0)
1929, 1931–33	Essendon	60 (6)
Total		61 (6)
- ^{1} Playing statistics correct to the end of 1933.

Albert John Williamson (20 May 1907 – 14 August 1965) was an Australian rules footballer who played with Carlton and Essendon in the Victorian Football League (VFL).

He was voted "Best First-Year Player" at Essendon in 1929.

Williamson transferred to Camberwell in 1934
