= Campbelltown Football Club =

Campbelltown

Names
- Full name: Campbelltown Australian Football Club
- Nickname: Monarch Blues
- Club song: We are the boys from Campbelltown

Club details
- Founded: 1975; 51 years ago
- Colours: Navy Blue and White
- President: Dave Bowen
- Coach: Chris Hunt
- Ground: Bob Prenter Oval

Uniforms
Home

Campbelltown Blues Australian Football Club was an Australian rules football club competing in the Sydney AFL and based out of the Sydney suburb of Macquarie Fields, New South Wales. In 2022, it merged with the South West Sydney Magpies to form the South West Sydney Blues.

== History ==
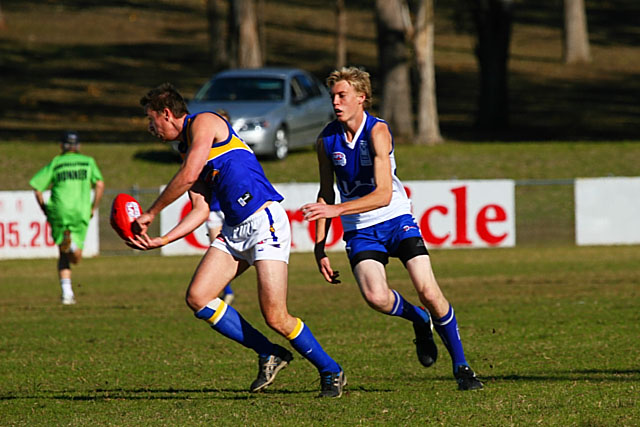
Campbelltown (right) play East Coast Eagles (left) in round 12, 2006

The Campbelltown Australian Football Club formed in 1975.

In 1986 Campbelltown became the first district Australian Rules football club to win the Sydney Football League.

In 2000, they aligned with the Penrith Panthers to become the Panthers. In 2002, they became the Campbelltown Kangaroos. This was later truncated to the Kangaroos.

In 2007, the club reverted to their old name, the "Blues".

Campbelltown players who have been recruited to play in the Australian Football League (AFL) include Chris Oliver (St Kilda 2001–03), Dustin Martin (Richmond 2010–24) and Tom Young (Collingwood 2011–12 and Western Bulldogs 2013–).

In 2022, it merged with the South West Sydney Magpies to form the South West Sydney Blues.
