= Balmain Australian Football Club =

Balmain

Names
- Full name: Balmain Australian Football Club
- Nickname: Tigers
- Club song: Tigerland

Club details
- Founded: 1903; 123 years ago
- Colours: Yellow Black
- Competition: AFL Sydney
- President: John Little
- Premierships: 7: 1988, 1989, 1992, 1997, 1998 (MD1), 2014 (MD1), 2026 (WD3, MD5)
- Ground: Rozelle Parklands, Rozelle; Birchgrove Oval, Birchgrove

Uniforms
Home	Away	Indigenous

Other information
- Official website: balmainafc.com

Balmain Australian Football Club is a NSWFL foundation Australian Football club competing in AFL Sydney. They are known by the nickname Tigers, and have previously been known as the Seagulls (1903 - 1919) and the Dockers (2007 - 2013).

== History ==
Australian rules football has been played in Balmain since at least 1888, when a team from the suburb, known as the Balmains, participated in the NSWFA.

The modern club was formed, as the Balmain Football Club, on 5 April 1903, following a meeting of 60 people at the Town Hall, presided by Mayor Alfred Crump. The following day, 6 April 1903, G. Chidgey was selected as the club's first president and a blue and red uniform for the club was selected. Balmain was a founding member of the New South Wales Australian Football League. Balmain were one of the first New South Wales based clubs to use a Sherrin football, when they did so during a game against Sydney on 30 May 1903. Balmain adopted the nickname Seagulls in June 1903.

Balmain played their first game against Redfern at Moore Park on 9 May 1903. Balmain enjoyed success both on and off the field during their first season. They won over half their matches in the 1903 NSWAFL season, finishing fourth on the ladder, and kicking a combined 61 goals while only having 28 goals scored against them. The Seagulls made finals, and played their first finals game against North Shore. The match was played on an unenclosed field. In the final quarter, the crowd encroached so much on the ground that play became almost an impossibility. As a result Balmain's captain directed his team to leave the field. As Balmain's captain had done this without first consulting the umpire, the game was decalred in favour of North Shore, who had been in front by 13 points when the game was abandoned. Balmain protested this, but to no avail. Although the club's funds were limited to memberships only, the club managed to make profit during 1903.

Balmain Seagulls Reserve Grade Premiers 1904

In 1904, the Balmain Seagulls made the Grand Final, which was played against North Shore at the Sydney Cricket Ground. The Seagulls trailed for the entire game and lost 5.13 (43) to 2.8 (20). The Seagulls Reserves Grade side had far more success, winning their premiership.

== Club identity and culture ==
=== Guernseys ===
Balmain originally played in blue and red, but had changed to yellow and black by 1915. The club's current home guernsey is based on the Richmond uniforms of yellow and black.

==== Uniform evolution ====
Balmain; Football Club (1903)	Balmain; Seagulls (1904)	Balmain; Tigers (1949)	Balmain; Tigers (1952-1960)	Balmain; Tigers (1961-1963)	Balmain; Tigers (1968-1981)

Balmain; Tigers (1982-2001)	Balmain; Tigers (2002-2006)	Balmain; Dockers (2007-2010)	Balmain; Dockers (2011-2013)	Balmain; Tigers (2014-present)

== Club honours ==
Premierships
Competition	Level	Wins	Years won
AFL Sydney Men's	Premier Division	2	1997, 1998
AFL Sydney Men's	Premier Division Reserves	1	1904
AFL Sydney Men's	Division One	1	2014
AFL Sydney Men's	Division Five	1	2026
AFL Sydney Women's	Division Three	1	2026
Sydney Women's AFL	First Grade	2	2011, 2012
Finishing positions
Competition	Position	Wins	Years won
AFL Sydney Men's Premier Division	Minor premiership*	0*	
AFL Sydney Men's Premier Division	Grand Finalist	6	1904, 1916, 1983, 1999, 2011, 2012
AFL Sydney Men's Premier Division	Wooden spoons*	13*	1948, 1973, 1974, 1977, 1978, 1980, 1984, 1994, 1995, 2003, 2006, 2007, 2009

^{*} This data is incomplete for the years 1913 to 1934

== Famous players ==
Jack Ashley played for Balmain before being recruited by Port Adelaide, taking part in the clubs 1913 Championship of Australia victory and winning the Magarey Medal the following year.

Sydney Swans player Troy Luff played for Balmain after retiring from the Australian Football League from 2002 onward. Rugby league player Wally Messenger (the brother of Dally Messenger) played for the club in its early days.

Players to make VFL/AFL level from the Balmain Tigers over the years included John Stephenson (1907, Essendon), Jack Armstrong (1925, St Kilda), Neil Davies (1955, Richmond), Paul Feltham (1970–78, North Melbourne, Richmond) and Ray Hall (1999, Richmond).

In 2010 and 2011 Nic Fosdike (Sydney Swans) was the senior playing coach while Nick Davis (Sydney Swans), Jason Saddington (Sydney Swans) and Chad Fletcher (West Coast Eagles) played alongside Fosdike.
