= UNSW-Eastern Suburbs Bulldogs =

Australian rules football club

UNSW-ES Bulldogs

Names
- Full name: University of New South Wales-Eastern Suburbs Australian Football Club
- Nickname: Bulldogs
- Club song: Oh we do like to be beside the seaside

AFL Sydney 2025 season
- After finals: 3rd (Prelimanary)
- Home-and-away season: 3rd

Club details
- Founded: 1999; 27 years ago
- Colours: Blue, White, Red
- Competition: AFL Sydney
- Premierships: NSWAFA (2) "East Sydney": 1881, 1884 AFL Sydney Men's (35) "East Sydney": 1903, 1911, 1918 "Paddington": 1915, 1916, 1917, 1919, 1920, 1922, 1924 "Eastern Suburbs":1926, 1927, 1941, 1953, 1954, 1955, 1956, 1957, 1958, 1959 "East Sydney": 1971, 1973, 1976, 1980, 1981, 1982, 1983, 1984 "UNSW-Eastern Suburbs" : 2002, 2003, 2012, 2018, 2019, 2022, 2023 AFL Sydney Women's (3); 2016, 2017, 2018

Uniforms
Home	Away

Other information
- Official website: unswesbulldogs.com.au

UNSW-Eastern Suburbs Bulldogs is an Australian rules football club competing in the Sydney AFL competition. They are based in the Eastern Suburbs of Sydney, and affiliated with the University of New South Wales.

== History ==
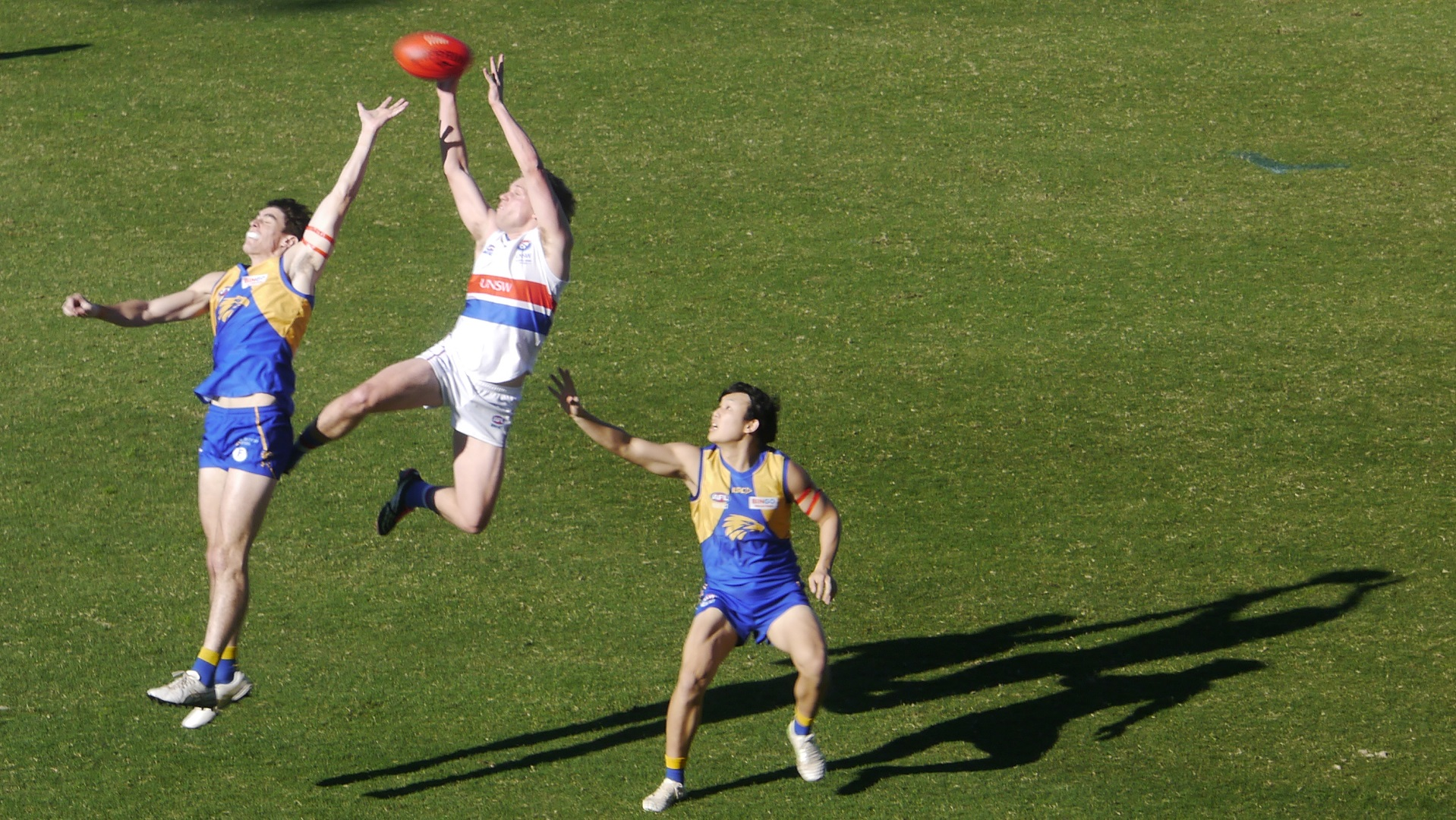
UNSW-ES Bulldogs play East Coast Eagles in the 2026 AFL Sydney Men's Premier Division.

The club formed in 1999 out of the merger of the Eastern Suburbs Australian Football Club (itself a merger of East Sydney and Paddington) with the University of New South Wales Australian National Football Club, but its origins are traced back to the East Sydney Australian Football Club in 1880.

Following the 1999 merger the club has won seven Men's Premier Division premierships, in 2002, 2003, 2012, 2018, 2019, 2022, and 2023.

In 2019 the club won the Grand Final across multiple AFL Sydney competitions, in the Under 19s, Men's Division 1, Men's Premier Division, and Women's Premier Division. Until 2018 the Women's Team was known as the Stingrays.

In 2027 the Bulldogs will compete alongside eight other AFL Syndey Premier Division teams in the Sydney Football League.

== Individual honours ==
=== Phelan Medal winners ===
The Phelan Medal is awarded to the best player in the AFL Sydney Men's Premier Division during the home-and-away season as voted by the umpires:

- Jason McPherson (2001)
- Troy Luff (2006)
- Dane Rampe (2012)
- Mitchell Conn (2022)

=== AFL Players ===
The following players have played in the Australian Football League:

- Will Langford (Hawthorn)
- Errol Gulden (Sydney Swans)
- Nick Blakey (Sydney Swans)
- Dane Rampe — (Sydney Swans)
- Ben Davis (Adelaide Crows)
- Mark Maclure (Carlton)
- Jack Buckley (GWS Giants)
- Jordan Foote (Sydney Swans)

=== AFLW Players ===
The following players have played in the AFL Women's:

- Ingrid Nielsen (GWS Giants)
- Rebecca Privitelli (GWS Giants, Carlton, and Sydney Swans)
- Rebecca Beeson (GWS Giants)
- Maddy Collier (GWS Giants, West Coast Eagles, and Sydney Swans)
- Courtney Gum (GW Giants and Adelaide Crows)
