= East Sydney Australian Football Club =

East coast Australian sports team

East Sydney

Names
- Full name: East Sydney Football Club

Club details
- Founded: 7 August 1880; 146 years ago
- Colours: Blue and Yellow
- Competition: New South Wales Australian Football League
- Premierships: NSWAFA (2): 1881, 1884; NSWAFL (3): 1903, 1911, 1918

Uniforms
Home

East Sydney Australian Football Club was a NSWFL Australian Football foundation club based out of the Sydney eastern suburbs in New South Wales.

== History ==
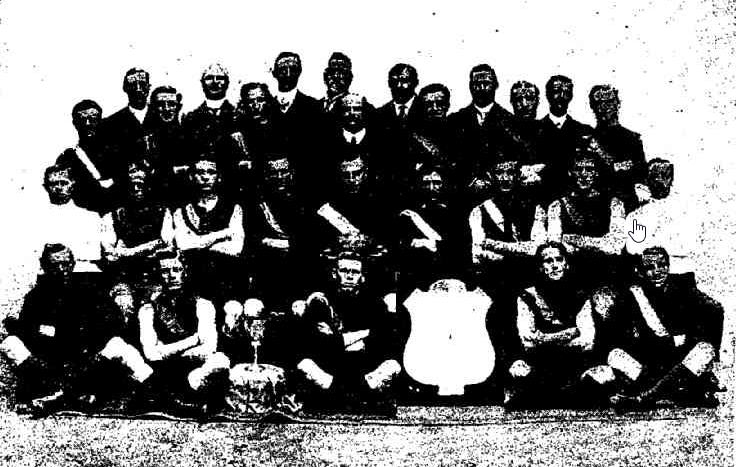
East Sydney Football Club 1911 premiers

The club formed on 7 August 1880 as the first dedicated Australian rules football club in New South Wales, alongside Sydney. East Sydney participated in the NSWAFA in 1881. The Sydney Morning Herald report on 12 August 1880 states, "A meeting was held on Tuesday night at the Cambridge Club hotel, Oxford street, to organise a club under the New South Wales Football Association".

On 9 July 1881 East Sydney played Melbourne in the first football game, of any code, to be played at the Sydney Cricket Ground. Melbourne won the game 2.22 (34) to 0.1 (1). The game was scheduled to start at 2:45 pm but, due to East Sydney missing players, the game did not start until 3:00 pm. The crowd for the game numbered 2500.

When Sydney Australian rules football was revived in 1903 by the formation of the New South Wales Australian Football League, East Sydney was among the first 11 clubs. In the inaugural season they also became the first team to score more than 200 points, when they defeated winless Alexandria 33.23. (221) to 1.1. (7) in round 9. East Sydney went undefeated for all of 1903, and made the Grand Final, where they defeated North Sydney to win the cup.

By the 1920s, East Sydney had become one of the most successful clubs in Sydney, along with Paddington Australian Football Club. In 1926, East Sydney merged with the Paddington club and became the Eastern Suburbs Australian Football Club.

In 1999 Eastern Suburbs merged with University of New South Wales Australian National Football Club to become the UNSW-Eastern Suburbs Bulldogs. East Sydney, barring name changes and mergers, is older than all but one other current major football club of any code in Sydney (that being Sydney University Football Club). This club pre-dates all Australian rugby league clubs by over 25 years, the Randwick rugby union team and all known soccer clubs.

== Club identity and culture ==
=== Home Ground ===
The home ground for East Sydney Football Club was Trumper Park Oval in Paddington. The ground had been used to host Sydney Football League grand finals for many years. In the mid-1980s the grand stand at the Oval was reduced in size. The East Sydney club rooms were demolished as part of this, and with it murials that had been created to celebrate East Sydney's centenery in 1980.

=== Guernseys ===
East Sydney originally played in blue and white uniforms, while in the NSWAFA. When the club joined the NSWAFL, in 1903, they played in blue uniforms with a yellow sash until their merger with Paddington in 1926.

== Club honours ==
Premierships
Competition	Level	Wins	Years won
NSWAFA	Flanagan Cup	2	1881, 1884
NSWANFL	First Grade	3	1903, 1911, 1918

=== List of Grand Final victories ===
Year	Competition	Opponent	Score
1903	New South Wales Australian Football League	North Shore	6.4 (44) - 4.2 (26)
1911	New South Wales Australian Football League	Sydney	4.5 (29) - 2.4 (16)
1918	New South Wales Australian Football League	Newtown	14.12 (96) - 6.7 (43)
