= Trumper Park Oval =

Sporting oval in Paddington, New South Wales

Coordinates: 33.881016°S 151.234789°E

Trumper Park Oval is a sporting oval in Paddington, New South Wales.

The oval is located at the corner of Glenmore Road & Hampden Street, Paddington and is named in honour of Victor Trumper. The oval has a long history of catering for Australian Football in the form of NSWFL foundation club, East Sydney, as well as catering for cricket and athletics. A series of walking trails connect surrounding streets.

Australian football has been played at this oval since at least 1903. To put this date of 1903 in perspective, Australian football was played on Trumper Oval five years prior to the establishment of the first rugby league competition in Australia. All the Sydney FL grand finals (bar one) between 1952 and 1977 were played at this venue.

Some of the biggest names in Australian football history have played on this oval including Jack Dyer (Richmond vs NSW 1946), Keith Miller (Sydney Naval), Bill Morris (Richmond), Kevin Murray (Fitzroy/East Perth) and John Pitura (North Shore) amongst many others.

== History ==
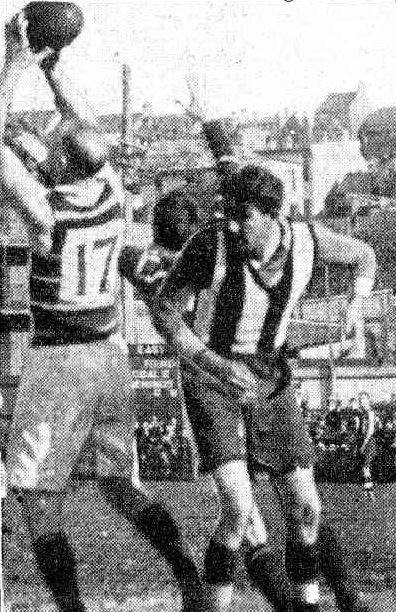
East vs Newtown Australian rules at Trumper Park in 1931. Matches at the ground in the 1920s and 1930s drew thousands of spectators.

Originally named Hampden Park Oval, the ground was built on a reclaimed swamp (Glenmore Brook runs down and under its middle), an old quarry and a garbage dump. It had to be built up by as much as 13 feet in some places in order to turn it into a cricket oval. It was named in honour of Viscount Hampden, Governor of New South Wales (1895–99) - Hampden Street alongside the park was originally named Ebenezer Street.

According to Rob Hillier's 1970 book the three first inhabitants of Paddington: Underwood, Forbes and Cooper - built a Gin Distillery just next to today's Trumper Park. According to Hillier, the teams who had to transport the gin back into the colony along Oxford Street (formerly South Head Road) were "winding between trees and outcrops of sandstone, between swamp and firm ground, found the easiest way for the footslogger was through land not yet parcelled out. But any track that opened up the bush was welcome, and once it was established it acted as a frontage for later grants of all sizes and the most incredible shapes. This track was named Glenmore Road and it is still the winding link between Oxford Street and the New South Head Road built in the 1830s along the harbour foreshores."

At the opening of the oval there was a great demonstration of community feeling - the owners of produce stores gave bags of potatoes, butchers in the district gave a sheep each, bakers gave bread and grocers gave jams and tea. A bullock was roasted whole and various games were held, including a fancy dress cricket match in which Trumper played.

The name of park, and the oval, was changed in 1931 to honour one of Paddington's cricketing heroes, Victor Trumper (1877-1915).

The Eastern Suburbs Roosters played a total of 10 first grade NSWRL games at Trumper Oval with 4 games in 1915, another 5 in 1934 and one game against North Sydney in 1941.

== Current Sporting Teams ==
The oval is currently home to the following sporting groups;

- UTS Australian Football Club
- Eastern Suburbs Juniors
- Eastern Suburbs Little Athletics
- Eastern Suburbs Cricket Club
- Wentworth Tennis

== Stands ==
In its present configuration the Frank Dixon grandstand is a single, ground-level grandstand. Originally constructed in 1936, the grandstand was reduced in size in the mid-1980s to reflect the current usage.
