= Inner West Magpies =

Names
- Full name: Inner West Magpies Football Club
- Nickname: Magpies

AFL Sydney Men's Premier Division 2026 season
- Home-and-away season: 9th

Club details
- Founded: 1926; 100 years ago
- Colours: Black and White
- Competition: AFL Sydney
- Ground: Picken Oval

Uniforms
| Home | Away | Women's |

Other information
- Official website: innerwestmagpiesafl.com.au

Inner West Magpies (formerly Western Suburbs AFC) is an Australian rules football club competing in the AFL Sydney league. The club is based in the inner west of Sydney, New South Wales, and its senior teams play their home games at their home ground of Picken Oval; having previously played out of Henson Park in 2009 and 2010. The Western Wolves AFC women's team fully integrated with the men's team before the 2019 AFL Sydney season; in conjunction with this integration the club changed its name in order to better represent its region and community.

== History ==
The Western Suburbs Australian Football Club was formed in 1926 as part of the NSWAFL's District Scheme. Many of the club's original players came from the now defunct East Sydney club. The club fell on hard times during the Great Depression and folded in the 1930s.

The club re-formed in 1947. The club, which became the first licensed Australian rules football club in New South Wales in 1962, is located in Croydon Park, next to Picken Oval. During the 1960s and 1970s, Western Suburbs was by far the most successful club in the competition. They made every grand final from 1963 to 1969 and every grand final from 1971 to 1979 bar one.

In 2005, in the premier division Western Suburbs only lost one of the 16 minor round games and secured the minor premiership. However, they lost the grand final to old rivals North Shore. In 2009 and 2010, the club under the coaching tutelage of Craig Tognolini, made the preliminary final.

Many players have been recruited from the Magpies to the AFL including Paul Bevan (Sydney), Arthur Chilcott (Sydney), Terry Ingersoll (Hawthorn) and Greg Stafford (Sydney/Richmond) amongst others. Paul Bevan was a Sydney Swans premiership player in 2005. John Northey coached at the club before coaching at AFL Level.

== Premierships ==
Senior men's premierships have been won in 1951, 1963, 1965, 1966, 1969, 1972, 1974, 1975, 1977 and 1996.
