= North Shore Australian Football Club =

North Shore Bombers

Names
- Full name: North Shore Australian Football Club
- Nickname: Bombers
- Club song: "See the Bombers fly up" – to the tune of "Keep Your Sunnyside Up"

AFL Sydney 2025 Premier Division season
- After finals: Men's: 1st (Premiers); Women's: 1st (Premiers)
- Home-and-away season: Men's: 2nd Women's: 2nd

Club details
- Founded: 25 February 1903; 123 years ago
- Colours: Black and Red
- Competition: Sydney AFL
- President: John Goode
- Coach: Daniel Roberts and Ryan Meldrum (men's), Craig Tidemann (women's)
- Captain(s): Ned Campbell, Matilda Eder and Olivia Edwards
- Ground: Gore Hill Oval, St Leonards

Uniforms
Home

Other information
- Official website: northshorefc.com.au

North Shore Australian Football Club, is an Australian rules football club competing in the AFL Sydney Premier League and based out of the Sydney suburb of St Leonards, New South Wales. They are known by the nickname Bombers, and were previously known as the Bears.

Formed in 1903 it remains one of only three foundation clubs still in existence, alongside UNSW-Eastern Suburbs and Balmain. North Shore are generally recognised as one of the more successful clubs of the AFL Sydney. The club's current home ground is Mortgage Choice Oval (also known as Gore Hill Oval) in St. Leonards, next to the Royal North Shore Hospital. Gore Hill Oval was redeveloped in 2018 and re-opened in 2019; and is believed to be the first or second senior AFL ground to have a synthetic surface.

== History ==
=== 20th century ===
The club formed on 25 February, 1903 at North Sydney School of Arts, North Sydney to play under Australian rules. The founding committee consisted of L. S. Splller, D. A. Madden, G. V. Padula, F. J. Hart, A. W. Ballhausen, T. Splller, A. Middleton, W. J. Williams, E. A. Wright, F. A. Beetson, C. Millard, E. Butcher, E. Truman, E. Robertson, and E. Attwater.

Between 1941 and 1946, North Shore did not compete in the NSWANFL.

=== 21st century ===
The Bombers competed in 6 Grand Finals in a row from 2000 to 2005, winning premierships in 2001, 2004, and 2005. Although the Bombers failed to qualify for the finals in 2006, they bounced back in 2007 to take their 13th premiership. In 2008, after a slow start to the season, the Bombers finished strongly to qualify for the final five, but were eliminated in the first finals match. They failed to qualify for the finals in 2009, but finished fifth in 2010 and fourth in 2011, 2012 and 2013. After missing the finals in 2014 and 2015; they have made the finals in every season since 2016, finishing in the top 2 after the home and away rounds in each season.

This team appeared in four Grand Finals in a row from 2014 to 2017, winning premierships in 2015 and 2016 and then won again in 2020.

North Shore fielded a Women's team for the first time in 2017, playing in the Women's Division One competition. Growth in the numbers of players in women's football has seen the club nominate a second women's team in 2018, a third in 2019, and five teams in 2020. the COVID-19 pandemic in New South Wales reduced the number of teams to 4. The Women's first grade team was promoted to Premier Division in 2020, and a new Women's Under 20 team will be taking the field for the first time in 2024.

With strong junior numbers coming through the ranks, from 2006 to 2008 North Shore fielded two teams in the Under 18s Premier Cup, Sydney AFL's strongest under-18s competition. One of their teams, the Bombers, took out the premiership in 2006 and 2008; while their other team, the Wildcats, took out the 2007 title undefeated. In 2008, the Wildcats changed their name to the Bears. However, the introduction of a divisional structure in the Sydney AFL competition, with a limit of one team per club in each division, saw North Shore only field one under 18s team from 2009 onwards. Strong player numbers coming through the junior pathway saw the club field a second Under 19s team in the Division Two competition from 2016.

North Shore have always fielded seniors and reserves teams, with the exception of during the Second World War. With solid growth in player numbers, a third open-age team was entered in 2011; competing in Division Three under the league's divisional structure. The thirds team was relegated after its first season, and now competes in Division Four. Continued growth in numbers saw a fourth open-age team entered in Division Five in 2014 and a fifth team in 2018.

In 2027, North Shore will compete alongside eight other AFL Syndey Premier Division teams in the Sydney Football League.

== Club identity and culture ==
=== Guernseys ===
The club wears guernseys similar to the Essendon Football Club in the AFL.

== Club honours ==
Premierships
| Competition | Level | Wins | Years won |
| AFL Sydney Men's | Premier Division | 16 | 1904, 1909, 1921, 1952, 1961, 1978, 1979, 1985, 1991, 2001, 2004, 2005, 2007, 2024, 2025, 2026 |
| AFL Sydney Men's | Premier Division Reserves | 20 | 1912, 1913, 1950, 1976, 1977, 1978, 1982, 1987, 1988, 1989, 1990, 1993, 1998, 2000, 2001, 2002, 2004, 2017, 2023, 2024 |
| AFL Sydney Men's | Division One | 2 | 2017, 2022 |
| AFL Sydney Men's | Under 18/19s | 17 | 1978, 1979, 1980, 1981, 1984, 1986, 1987, 1988, 1991, 2006, 2007, 2008, 2009, 2015, 2016, 2020, 2024 |
| AFL Sydney Women's | Premier Division | 1 | 2025 |
| AFL Sydney Women's | Division Three | 1 | 2022 |
Finishing positions
| Competition | Position | Wins | Years won |
| AFL Sydney Men's Premier Division | Minor premiership* | 16* | 1904, 1909, 1978, 1984, 1986, 1991, 1998, 2001, 2003, 2004, 2018, 2020**, 2021**, 2023, 2024, 2026 |
| AFL Sydney Men's Premier Division | Grand Finalist | 19 | 1903, 1929, 1955, 1970, 1976, 1977, 1980, 1984, 1986, 1989, 1990, 1992, 1993, 1994, 2000, 2002, 2003, 2022, 2023 |
| AFL Sydney Men's Premier Division | Wooden spoons* | 3* | 1908, 1939, 1996 |

^{*} This data is incomplete for the years 1913 to 1934
^{**}The 2020 and 2021 seasons were affected by the COVID-19 pandemic in New South Wales

=== Lists of Grand Final victories ===
==== Men's Premier Division ====
| No. | Year | Opponent | For | Against |
|---|---|---|---|---|
| 1 | 1904 | Balmain | 5.13 (43) | 2.8 (20) |
| 2 | 1909 | YMCA | 7.5 (45) | 5.5 (35) |
| 3 | 1921 | Newtown | 11.5 (71) | 7.12 (52) |
| 4 | 1952 | Western Suburbs | 11.7 (73) | 9.12 (66) |
| 5 | 1961 | Sydney Naval | 11.15 (81) | 4.11 (35) |
| 6 | 1978 | Western Suburbs | 17.17 (119) | 13.12 (90) |
| 7 | 1979 | Western Suburbs | 13.17 (95) | 9.22 (76) |
| 8 | 1985 | Campbelltown | 18.19 (127) | 14.12 (96) |
| 9 | 1991 | Holroyd-Parramatta | 10.13 (73) | 7.9 (51) |
| 10 | 2001 | Campbelltown | 12.12 (84) | 10.9 (69) |
| 11 | 2004 | St George | 10.11 (71) | 7.4 (46) |
| 12 | 2005 | Western Suburbs | 13.9 (87) | 6.10 (46) |
| 13 | 2007 | St George | 12.15 (87) | 9.12 (66) |
| 14 | 2024 | Manly Warringah | 10.9 (69) | 5.6 (36) |
| 15 | 2025 | Manly Warringah | 14.5 (89) | 7.8 (50) |

==== Women's Premier Division ====
| No. | Year | Opponent | For | Against |
|---|---|---|---|---|
| 1 | 2025 | Sydney University | 5.4 (34) | 3.6 (24) |

==== Premier Division Reserves ====
| No. | Year | Opponent | For | Against |
|---|---|---|---|---|
| 1 | 1912 | Balmain | 1.6 (12) | 0.2 (2) |
| 2 | 1913 | Paddington | 5.5 (35) | 3.6 (24) |
| 3 | 1950 | Newtown | 7.9 (51) | 5.11 (41) |
| 4 | 1976 | East Sydney | 15.9 (99) | 13.11 (89) |
| 5 | 1977 | Western Suburbs | 10.16 (76) | 8.13 (61) |
| 6 | 1978 | Western Suburbs | 17.17 (119) | 13.12 (90) |
| 7 | 1982 | Western Suburbs | 8.5 (53) | 2.10 (22) |
| 8 | 1987 | Campbelltown | 16.19 (106) | 13.13 (91) |
| 9 | 1988 | East Sydney | 9.14 (68) | 5.8 (38) |
| 10 | 1989 | St George | 11.8 (74) | 11.7 (73) |
| 11 | 1990 | Holroyd-Parramatta | 7.12 (54) | 7.10 (52) |
| 12 | 1993 | Western Suburbs | 11.5 (71) | 10.7 (67) |
| 13 | 1998 | Balmain | 8.9 (57) | 8.8 (56) |
| 14 | 2000 | Pennant Hills | 9.8 (62) | 8.13 (61) |
| 15 | 2001 | St George | 9.9 (63) | 7.6 (48) |
| 16 | 2002 | Pennant Hills | 12.14 (86) | 6.8 (44) |
| 17 | 2004 | Pennant Hills | 12.8 (80) | 6.8 (44) |
| 18 | 2017 | Western Suburbs | 9.4 (58) | 6.4 (40) |
| 19 | 2023 | Sydney University | 6.7 (43) | 5.10 (40) |
| 20 | 2024 | Sydney University | 8.8 (56) | 6.11 (47) |

==== Men's Division 1 ====
| No. | Year | Opponent | For | Against |
|---|---|---|---|---|
| 1 | 2017 | Camden | 13.15 (93) | 6.8 (44) |
| 2 | 2022 | Sydney Uni | 8.10 (58) | 3.9 (27) |

==== Women's Division Three ====
| No. | Year | Opponent | For | Against |
|---|---|---|---|---|
| 1 | 2022 | Parramatta | 4.11 (35) | 1.2 (8) |

==== Under 18/19 ====
| No. | Year | Opponent | For | Against |
|---|---|---|---|---|
| 1 | 1978 | St George | 13.15 (93) | 14.8 (92) |
| 2 | 1979 | St George | 16.20 (116) | 6.2 (38) |
| 3 | 1980 | East Sydney | 17.18 (120) | 1.6 (12) |
| 4 | 1981 | St George | 15.8 (98) | 10.17 (77) |
| 5 | 1984 | Pennant Hills | 16.7 (103) | 7.16 (58) |
| 6 | 1986 | Pennant Hills | 10.20 (80) | 7.7 (49) |
| 7 | 1987 | Campbelltown | 8.8 (56) | 8.6 (54) |
| 8 | 1988 | St George | 13.3 (81) | 9.9 (63) |
| 9 | 1991 | St George | 10.10 (70) | 4.6 (30) |
| 10 | 2006 | Pennant Hills | 9.10 (64) | 1.1 (7) |
| 11 | 2007 | Pennant Hills | 10.11 (71) | 5.7 (37) |
| 12 | 2008 | East Coast | 15.11 (101) | 8.11 (59) |
| 13 | 2009 | St George | 8.9 (57) | 6.9 (45) |
| 14 | 2015 | UNSW/ES | 7.15 (57) | 7.4 (46) |
| 15 | 2016 | UNSW/ES | 15.8 (98) | 10.7 (67) |
| 16 | 2020 | UNSW/ES | 14.13 (97) | 7.7 (49) |
| 17 | 2024 | Sydney Uni | 13.13 (91) | 5.10 (40) |

==== Under 19s Division Two ====
| No. | Year | Opponent | For | Against |
|---|---|---|---|---|
| 1 | 2022 | Manly | 9.6 (60) | 6.5 (41) |

==== Men's Platinum Reserves ====
| No. | Year | Opponent | For | Against |
|---|---|---|---|---|
| 1 | 2023 | Camden | 7.5 (47) | 4.5 (29) |

==== Men's Division 2 ====
| No. | Year | Opponent | For | Against |
|---|---|---|---|---|
| 1 | 2023 | Manly | 7.4 (46) | 5.9 (39) |

==== Men's Division 3(A) ====
| No. | Year | Opponent | For | Against |
|---|---|---|---|---|
| 1 | 2019 | UNSW-ES | 3.10 (28) | 3.6 (24) |

== Individual Honours ==
=== Notable Players ===
The club has produced AFL players such as Ryan Davis, Russell Morris, Lewis Roberts-Thomson, Henry Playfair, Phil Bradmore, Andrew Bomford, Simon Davies, Michael Byrne and Will Sierakowski. Former North Shore Bombers Sam Naismith and Callum Mills are currently playing for the Sydney Swans. Luke Parks is currently listed at Carlton. The club has also had a number of players admitted onto senior club rookie lists with Ed Clarke, Tom Hill and Mark Livy all listed with the Sydney Swans at one point throughout their careers. Most recently Callum Mills was drafted with the third pick in the 2015 AFL draft when the Sydney Swans matched Melbourne Demons bid on Mills.

Tennis champion Pat Rafter played a number of games for the reserves in 2004.

Barry Breen, who kicked the winning behind for St Kilda in their 1966 premiership, would go on to coach North Shore to a premiership in 1985.
