= Tackle (football move) =

Defensive move in various forms of football

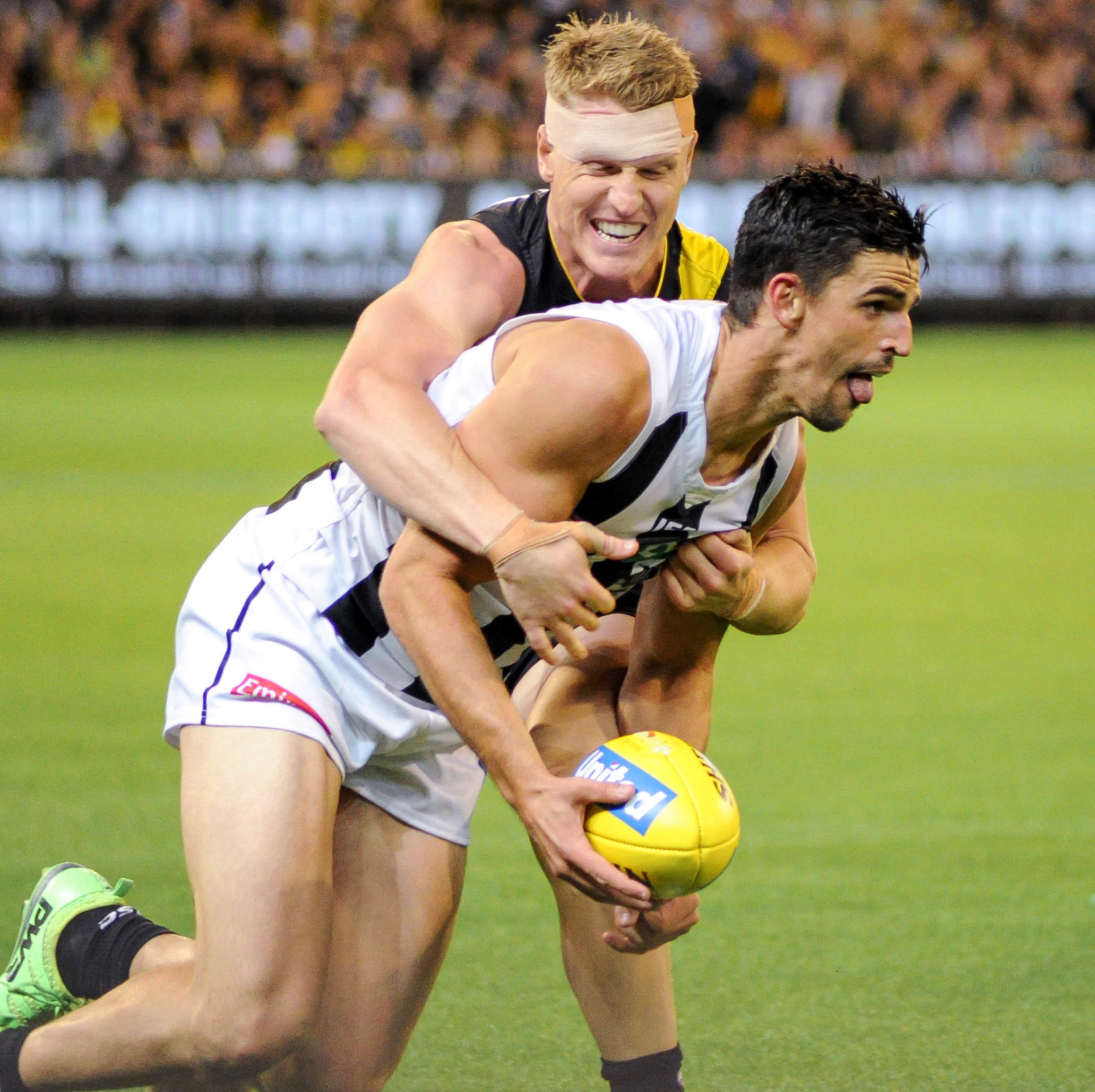
A tackle in Australian rules football

Most forms of football have a move known as a tackle. The primary purposes of tackling are to dispossess an opponent of the ball, to stop the player from gaining ground towards goal or to stop them from carrying out what they intend.

The word is used in some contact variations of football to describe the act of physically holding or wrestling a player to the ground. In others, it simply describes one or more methods of contesting for possession of the ball. It can therefore be used as both a defensive or attacking move.

== Name origin ==
In Middle Dutch, the verb tacken meant to grab or to handle. By the 14th century, this had come to be used for the equipment used for fishing, referring to the rod and reel, etc., and also for that used in sailing, referring to rigging, equipment, or gear used on ships. By the 18th century, a similar use was applied to harnesses or equipment used with horses. Modern use in football comes from the earlier sport of rugby, where the word was used in the 19th century.

== Association football ==
Unlike other codes, tackles in association football have to be predominantly directed against the ball rather than the player in possession of it. This is achieved by using either leg to wrest possession from the opponent, or sliding in on the grass to knock the ball away. A defender is permitted to use their body to obstruct the motion of a player with the ball, and this may be part of a successful tackle. Pulling a player to the ground in the style of tackle common to other codes is completely absent from the game (this would be considered "violent conduct" and result in a red card (dismissal)).

Although some contact between players is allowed, the rules of association football significantly limit the physicality of tackles, explicitly forbidding contacts which are "careless, reckless or [use] excessive force". Almost all tackles where the tackler's legs make contact with the opponent before the ball are considered illegal, and heavy contact after initially touching the ball may also be penalised.

Illegal tackles are fouls and are punished with a direct free kick (or penalty if committed within the penalty area) for the opponent's team. Such incidents are common, with dozens of occurrences in a typical match. In most cases these fouls are not considered misconducts, however yellow cards (cautions) may be delivered for more egregious fouls that constitute "unsporting behaviour". If a foul tackle endangers the tackled player's safety, it is likely to be considered as "serious foul play" by the referee and punished with a red card (dismissal).

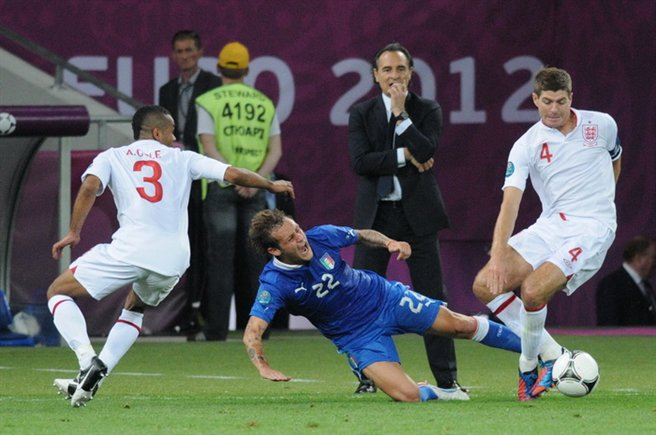
Alessandro Diamanti (22) slide tackles Steven Gerrard (4) at Euro 2012

Tackles that involve lunging at an opponent with both legs, regardless of whether the ball is won, are generally considered to constitute serious foul play and hence result in a sending-off. This explicitly includes "scissoring" (tackling with legs apart, so as to trap the opponent's leg or legs in between), which is likely to be punished with a sending-off (red card), as it poses a high risk of severe knee injury to the player being tackled. Tackling with studs up is considered dangerous. A studs up tackle is made when a player lunges into a tackle with a leg or both legs outstretched exposing the soles of their boots. Referees are encouraged to at the very least caution (yellow card) players who commit such challenges.

Additionally, an illegal tackle which is also a professional foul is considered misconduct.

The most spectacular form of tackle in association football is the slide tackle, wherein a tackler slides, leg extended, along the ground, aiming to hit the ball away. This form of tackle carries a high risk of committing a foul due to the high speed you are heading towards the opponents legs.

"Diving" in association football involves tackled players exaggerating the physicality of tackles, so as to gain favourable decisions from the referee.

== Australian rules football ==
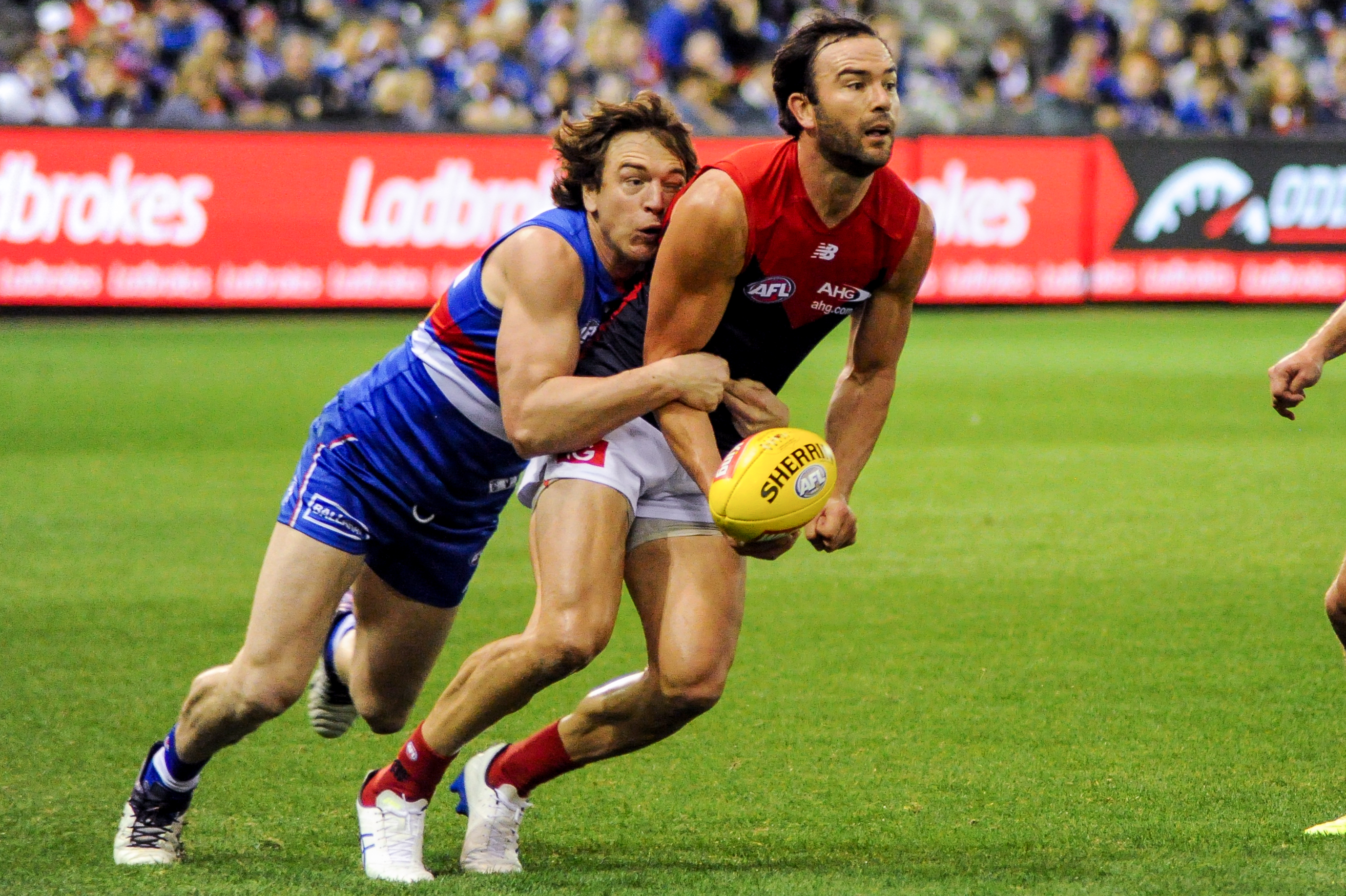
Western Bulldogs player Liam Picken tackling Jordan Lewis of Melbourne, who is attempting a handball

In Australian rules football, the move commonly described as a "tackle" is similar to in rugby and involves wrapping, holding or wrestling a player who has possession of the ball to the ground. Tackling players not in possession of the ball is not allowed, this is considered "holding the man" and penalised with a free kick to the opposition.

As there is no offside rule in Australian rules football, players can be tackled from any direction, and are often blindsided. For this reason, the sport allows players to shepherd and bump their opponents within 5 metres of the ball, to protect the ball carrier.

A tackled player must immediately dispose of the ball legally, by kicking or handballing, but not by throwing or dropping the ball. If this is not done, a holding the ball free kick will be awarded to the tackler. If the ball is knocked free by the tackler, pinned to the player by the tackler, or the player unsuccessfully attempts a kick or handball, a free kick will only be awarded if the ball-carrier is deemed to have had a prior opportunity to dispose of the ball prior to being tackled. If a player has not had prior opportunity to dispose of the ball and a tackler knocks the ball free during a tackle, then no free kick is paid and the game continues.

A tackle must only contact below the shoulders and above the knees, and a player is able to be thrown to the ground, so long as the tackle is deemed not to be reckless or likely to cause injury. There are also rules outlawing pushing in the back making tackling more difficult. Tripping, by both hand or foot, is not allowed and can be a reportable offence.

Players wear little to no padding to cushion the impact of tackles; however, players generally wear mouthguards to protect their teeth.

=== Types of tackles in Australian rules ===
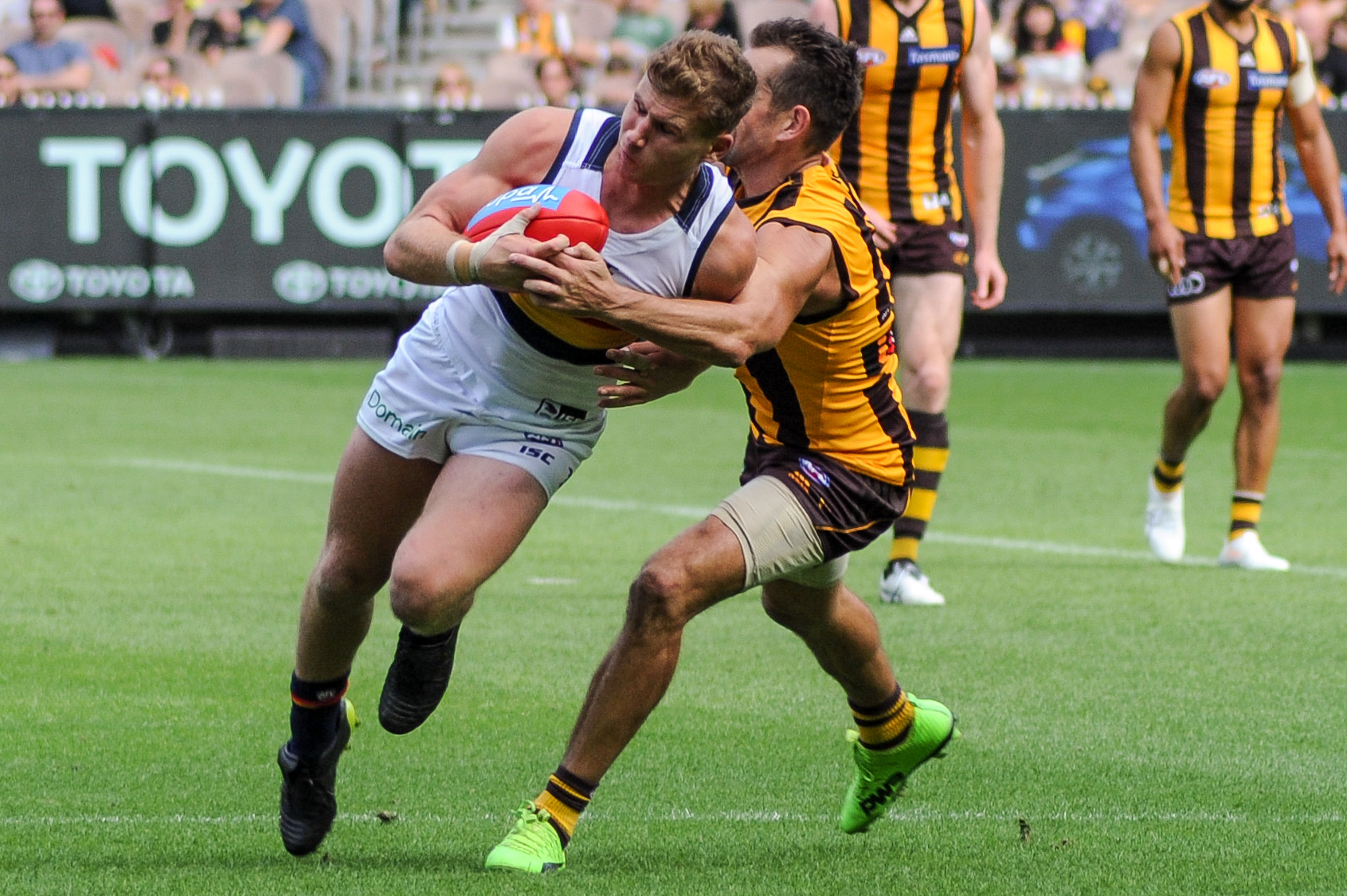
Rory Laird attempts to break a Luke Hodge tackle

There are many types of tackles in Australian rules football:

- perfect tackle – when a player lays a tackle on an opponent that has had prior opportunity to dispose of the ball and in the process makes it impossible for their opponent to dispose of the ball. For example, if a tackler pins an opponent's arm, then the opponent cannot possibly handball, and if they pin both arms, then it is nearly impossible to legally execute a kick. A player is almost always rewarded for a perfect tackle (except in the case of a slam tackle – see below).
- gang tackle – when the player in possession is tackled by more than one opponent at the same time.
- high tackle – any tackle which infringes on the opponent's neck or head. This includes any tackle which slips above the A/C joint. This is illegal and the penalty is a free kick.
- coathanger – slang for high contact to the head, usually by a stiff arm, which causes a player to land flat on their back. It is often accidental due to the high pace of the game. The penalty may be a free kick if deemed accidental or a reportable offence which may result in suspension.
- diving tackle – when a player leaves the ground in attempting to tackle
- slinging – a player slung to the ground in a tackle
- broken tackle – when a player is able to break free of a tackle
- spear tackle – also known as a dangerous throw in rugby, it is a reportable offence and may result in suspension
- push in the back – Any tackle which forces the player forward, into the ground, or both, from behind. This is an illegal tackle and the penalty is a free kick.
- bump or hip and shoulder tackle is a legal Aussie rules tactic for both dispossession of the player with the ball and also impeding players involved in a contest but not in possession of the ball. The difference between a bump and a tackle is that arms are not used in a bump, which must be made side-on using the hip and or shoulder. Not all bumping is legal, however. Aggressive head on bumping or "charging" of a player with the ball is often described as "rough play" and is a reportable offence, this is particularly so if a player is deemed to have their head down over the ball in an attempt to picking it up off the ground when the bump is applied or contact is made above the shoulders. Standing ground against an oncoming player, however, is legal.
- slam tackle – relatively new term for a tackle which results in an opponent's head being deliberately slammed to the ground. It is often associated with the pinning of the arms of an opponent so that they cannot cushion the impact of their head on the ground. Although tolerated in days gone by in recent years, in 2009, the AFL branded this a dangerous type of tackle. Incidents in the professional AFL involving Byron Pickett and Darren Milburn have come under particular scrutiny.
- wing tackle or Chicken wing tackle – when one arm is pinned in a tackle. After sustaining severe damage from this type of tackle during the 2009 AFL season, Brent Harvey called for this type of tackle to be banned.

=== Other tackling methods ===
Although the term "tackle" is used in Australian rules to exclusively describe wrapping, holding or wrestling a player in possession, there are also several other ways of contesting possession in Australian rules that other sports would describe as a "tackle" and that also involve a degree of contact.

Other defensive actions are generally categorised as one percenters. The defensive tactic of punching away (commonly known as spoiling) from a player is allowed. Smothering, which involves using the arms or body to get in the way of an opponent's kick as it leaves their boot, is similar to a charge down in rugby football.

== Gaelic football ==
Gaelic football defines tackling as wresting the ball from an opponent's hands. Bumping is allowed on the player with the ball, but a player cannot be grabbed.

== Gridiron football ==
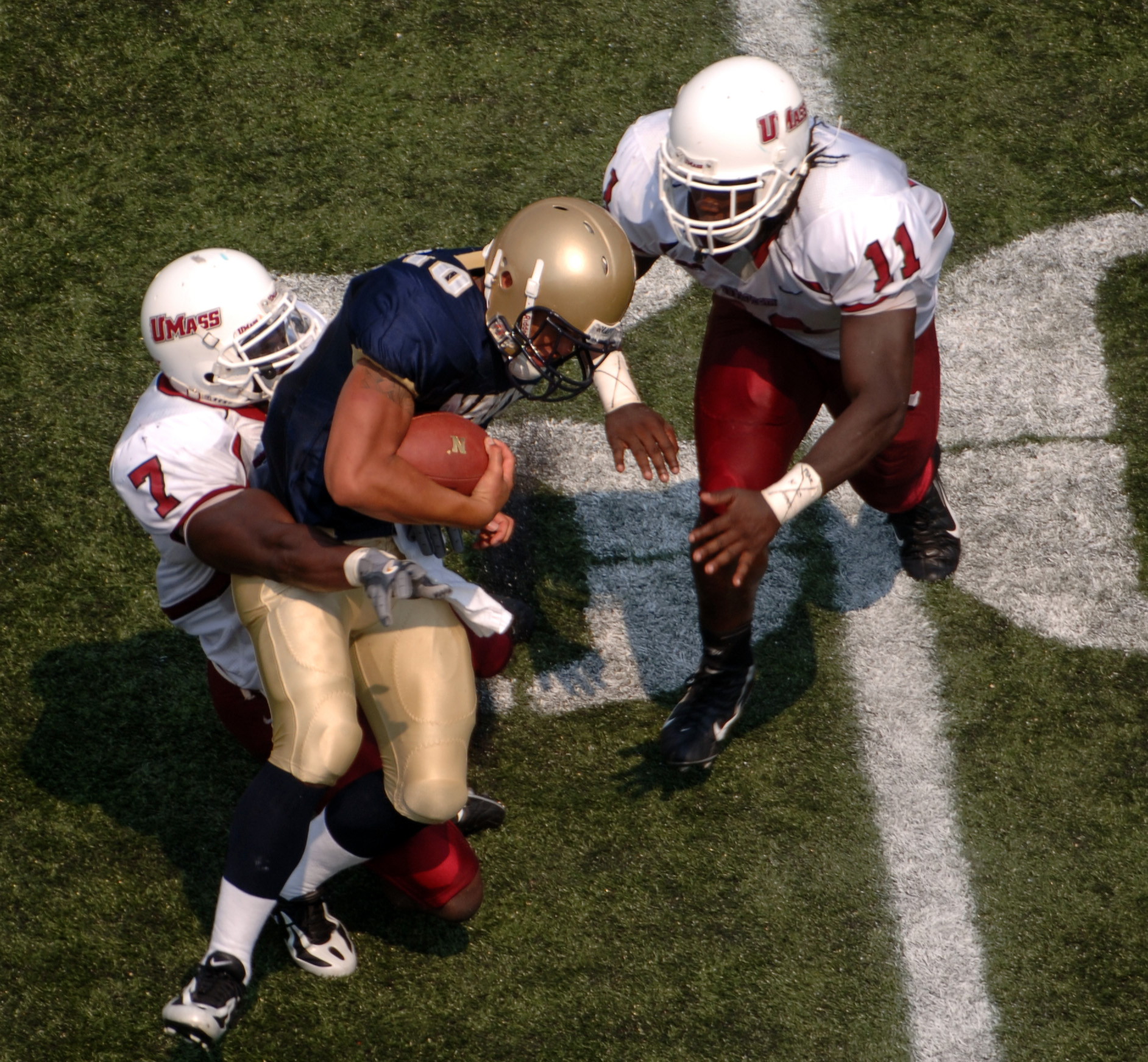
College football game: Navy quarterback Kaipo-Noa Kaheaku-Enhada (center) is tackled by Massachusetts defenders James Ihedigbo (left) and Charles Walker (right).

In American football and Canadian football, to tackle is to physically interfere with the forward progress of a player in possession of the ball, such that his forward progress ceases and is not resumed, or such that he is caused to touch some part of his body to the ground other than his feet or hands, or such that he is forced to go out of bounds. In any such case, the ball becomes dead, the down is over, and play ceases until the beginning of the next play.

A tackle is known as a quarterback sack when the quarterback is tackled at or behind the line of scrimmage while attempting to throw a pass. A tackle for loss is a tackle that causes a loss of yardage for the opposing running back or wide receiver. This happens when the quarterback is sacked, when either a rusher or a receiver is tackled behind the line of scrimmage, or when the ball is fumbled behind the line of scrimmage and was picked up by an offensive player who does not manage to move past the line before being tackled. When a player who does not have the ball is taken down, it is generally referred to as a block.

Tacklers are not required to wrap their arms around the ball carrier before bringing him to the ground; in fact, the ball carrier is often "tackled" by the defender taking a running start and hitting the ball carrier to knock them to the ground. Tackles can also be made by grabbing the ball carrier's jersey (or even hair, should it be long enough and allowed to dangle freely from beneath the helmet) and pulling him to the ground. As mentioned above, the referee can declare that a play is dead if the ball carrier's forward progress has been stopped, even if he has not actually been taken to the ground.

To protect players from potentially catastrophic injury, there are some restrictions on tackles and blocks. At no time may a defensive player tackle an offensive player by grabbing the facemask of their helmet; doing so incurs a 15-yard penalty and the victimized team is awarded a new set of downs. Although spear tackles are allowed in gridiron football, a player may not use his helmet to tackle an opponent as the technique can cause serious injury to both players (more often the tackler, due to the force of reaction on the tackler, which is apt to be beyond the limit that the neck can handle) and also warrants a 15-yard penalty as well as a fresh set of downs if committed by the defending team; this is known as "spearing the player". A similar penalty is assessed to any player attempting to make contact with his helmet against another opponent's helmet, which is known as a helmet-to-helmet collision. Grabbing a ball carrier by the pads behind his neck and pulling him down is known as a "horse collar", a method which has been made illegal at all levels of American football.

It is also illegal to tackle a player who has thrown a forward pass (generally a quarterback) after he has released the ball; doing so is called "roughing the passer" and incurs a 15-yard penalty and a fresh set of downs for the team with the ball. However, in the NFL a player can continue forward for one step, which means that often a player who is committed to attacking the quarterback will still make a tackle. Place kickers and punters are afforded an even greater protection from being tackled.

Once the play is ruled complete, no contact is permitted; a player who makes contact with an opponent after the play is charged with "unnecessary roughness" and his team is assessed a 15-yard penalty.

Blocks that occur in the back of the legs and below the knees, initiated below the waist, or clotheslines are also generally prohibited and players who use them are subject to much more severe penalties than other illegal tackles. However, a player who plays on the line can block below the knees (cut block) as long the block is within five yards of the line and the player they block is in front of them and not engaged by another blocker (chop block).

In the National Football League (NFL), tackles are tracked as an unofficial statistic by a scorekeeper hired by the home team. Though the statistic is widely cited, the league does not verify that the counts are accurate.

On November 12, 2022, Carlton Martial of Troy recorded his 546th tackle to break the Division I FBS record for most tackles in a career.

== International rules football ==
International rules football is a hybrid game between Australian rules football and Gaelic football. Tackling in International Rules is subject to similar rules as Australian rules football, but with some subtle differences. Tackling is only allowed as low as the waist, whereas it is allowed down to the knees in Aussie Rules. One handed tackling has been banned in International Rules since the 2008 International Rules Series.

== Rugby football ==
=== Rugby league ===
Rugby tackles

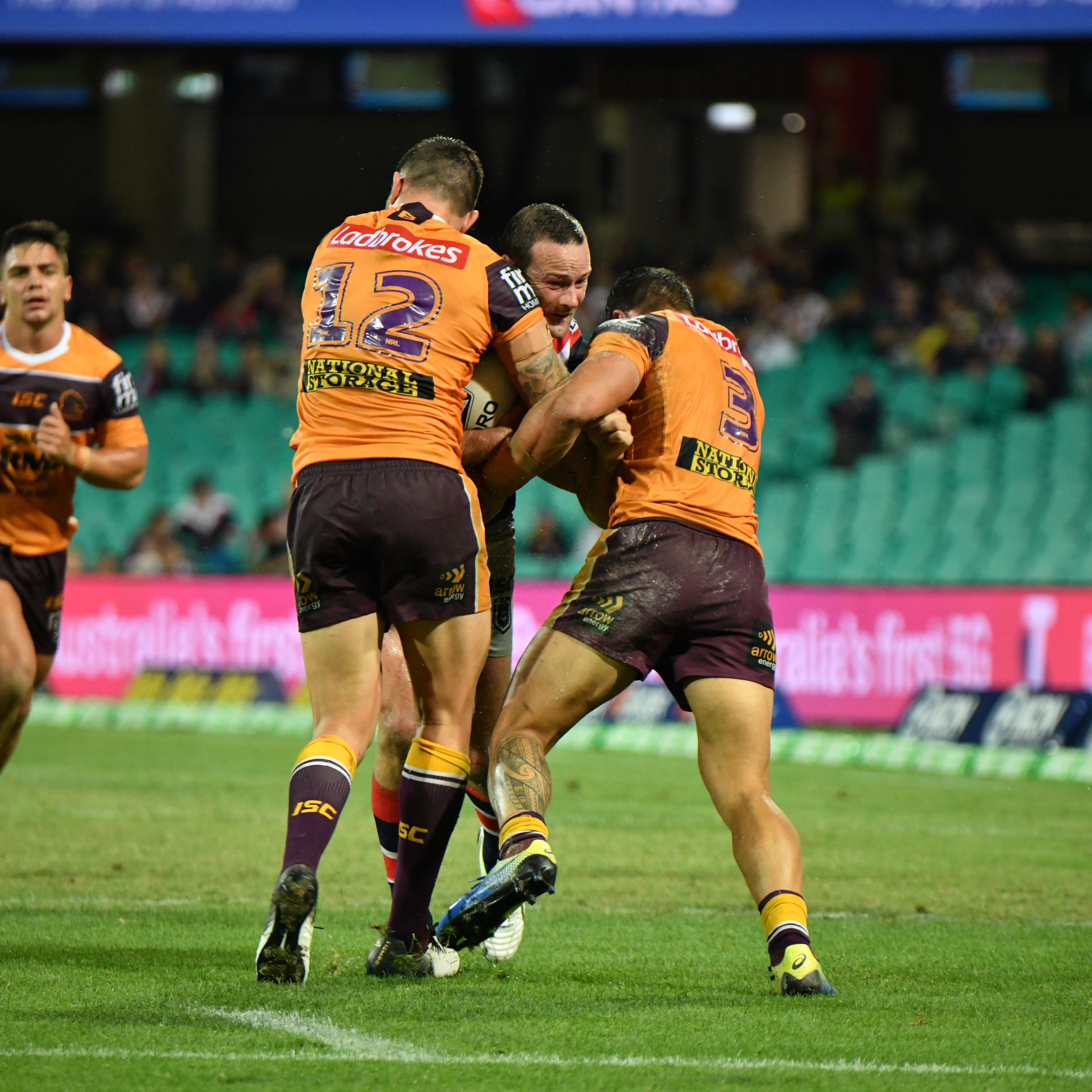
Rugby league tackle

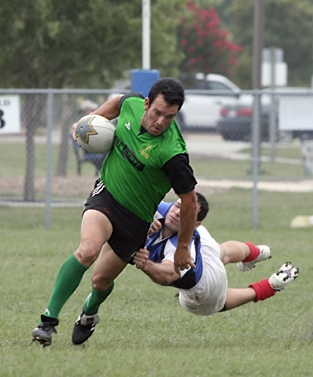
Diving tackle (rugby union)

In rugby league the ball-carrier can be tackled by any number of defenders from any direction. The initial contact in the tackle must be made below the ball carrier's neck or it will be deemed a high tackle and penalised. A tackle in rugby league is completed when any of the following occurs:

- The attacking player's ball or the hand or arm holding the ball comes into contact with the ground while still held by one or more defenders.
- Although still on his feet, the attacking player's forward momentum has ceased while still held by one or more defender.
- Being held by a defender, the attacking player makes it evident that he has succumbed to the tackle and wishes to be released in order to play-the-ball.
- A defender places a hand on the attacking player lying on the ground.

Once the tackle is completed, the ball-carrier must be allowed to get to his feet to 'play-the-ball' and the defensive team must retreat 10 metres (except 2 markers, facing the tackled player). Spear tackles are illegal in rugby league, with most tackles in which the defender is lifted 'above the horizontal' bringing about penalties in the modern game. A stiff arm tackle is an offence. A 2012 New Zealand study found that over 659 tackles are made per game in professional rugby league. Of all the rugby league positions, second-row averages the most tackles.

=== Rugby union ===
In rugby union, a player must be brought to ground for a tackle to be completed. The tackled player must release the ball, but the ball is not dead and a ruck forms to contest possession of it. If the ball carrier is not brought to the ground a maul will usually form. High/reckless or stiff arm tackles laws once dictated any contact made above the shoulders was an offence. Now, even if contact starts below the shoulders, if the head is involved in any reckless tackle it results in the offending player being given a yellow card and therefore sin binned. World Rugby now defines a reckless tackle as being any contact where the tackler "knew or should have known that there was a risk of making contact with the head of an opponent, but did so anyway"

== Non-tackling variants ==
For various codes of football, variant codes have been developed which substitute out the tackling element, making the game less physical. In these games, either a being touched by an opponent or, in some codes, having a tag on the player's person removed, has effects similar to a tackle in the parent code.

Major non-tackling variants
Parent football code	Major non-tackling variants
Gridiron	Touch football Flag football.
Rugby	Touch rugby: Touch; League tag; Tag rugby; American flag rugby
Australian	Rec footy

== Other uses ==
Other non-football games that feature ball-tackling or similar concepts include hurling, hockey and shinty, while tackling of people is featured in games like kabaddi. With the increasing popularity of football in the late 19th century, tackling had been integrated into field-based chasing games such as British Bulldog (game), Pom-Pom-Pull-Away and British Bulldog. For younger boys, these children's games became essential for the acquisition of football skills.

== Tackle types ==
Some illegal tackle moves result in a penalty play, however others may be "reportable" offences — that is, the option exists for an official to penalise a player's conduct individually rather than during the game refer it to a tribunal for deferred penalty.

Allowable / forbidden tackles by football code
Code	Sliding tackle	Spear tackle	Dump tackle	Body tackle	Ankle tap	Diving tackle	Bumping/ blocking	Shoulder charge	Intercept ball	Chicken wing	Other
Association (Note: Tackling with the hands strictly not allowed)	Yes	No	No	No	No	No	No	Restricted (Note: Minor charge or push, shoulder-to-shoulder only, if both players are in direct battle for possession)	Restricted (Note: Foot only)	No	
Australian rules	No (Note: Classified as a trip)	Reportable	Yes	Restricted (Note: Between knees and shoulders, no pushing in the back)	No	Yes	Yes (Note: within 5 metres of ball)	Reportable	Yes	Reportable	Spoil, Shepherd, Smother
Gaelic (Note: Tackling with the hands not allowed)	No	No	No	No	No	No	Restricted (Note: Only on player with the ball)	No	No	Restricted (Note: No interference allowed)	
Gridiron	No	Yes (Note: Illegal if Leading with Head)	Yes	Yes	Yes	Yes	Yes	Yes	Yes	Yes	
Rugby league	Reportable	Reportable	Yes	Yes (Note: No grappling around the neck)	Yes	Yes	Penalty	Penalty	Restricted (Note: No knock ons allowed)	Reportable	Charge down
Rugby union	Reportable	Reportable	Yes	Yes	Yes	Yes	Penalty	No	Restricted	Penalty	Charge down

== Controversial techniques ==
- spear tackle (dangerous throw) – (illegal in both rugby codes and Australian rules)
- high tackle (illegal head-high tackle) – rugby league and Australian rules (see also coathanger)
- grapple tackle – a controversial rugby league tackling technique similar to a chokehold.
- chicken wing tackle – also banned in rugby league
- horse-collar tackle – banned in gridiron football by the NFL, the NCAA, and the CFL. This tackle involves the defender reaching his hand inside the ball carrier's collar, grabbing the collar (and usually, the collar of the shoulder pads), and pulling player straight down or backwards and down. The tackle has the potential to cause severe injuries to the tackled player's neck, legs and ankles. It is considered an "equipment tackle", meaning the protective equipment used by the players is what is used to make the tackle (similarly, a face-mask tackle is considered an "equipment tackle"). The horse-collar was made infamous by Dallas Cowboys free safety Roy Williams when he performed it on Philadelphia Eagles wide receiver Terrell Owens.

== See also ==
- Checking - similar concept in ice hockey
