= Sydney Football Club =

Sydney Football Club may refer to the following clubs based in Sydney, Australia. These clubs which bear the city's name participate in distinct codes of football.

- Sydney FC, a soccer (association football) club
- Sydney Roosters, a rugby league club
- Sydney Swans, an Australian rules football club
- a defunct Australian rules (and later rugby union club), formed in 1865
- Sydney Football Club (NSWAFL), an Australian rules football club formed in 1881 and closed in 1954
