= Shepherding (Australian rules football) =

Legally pushing, bumping or blocking

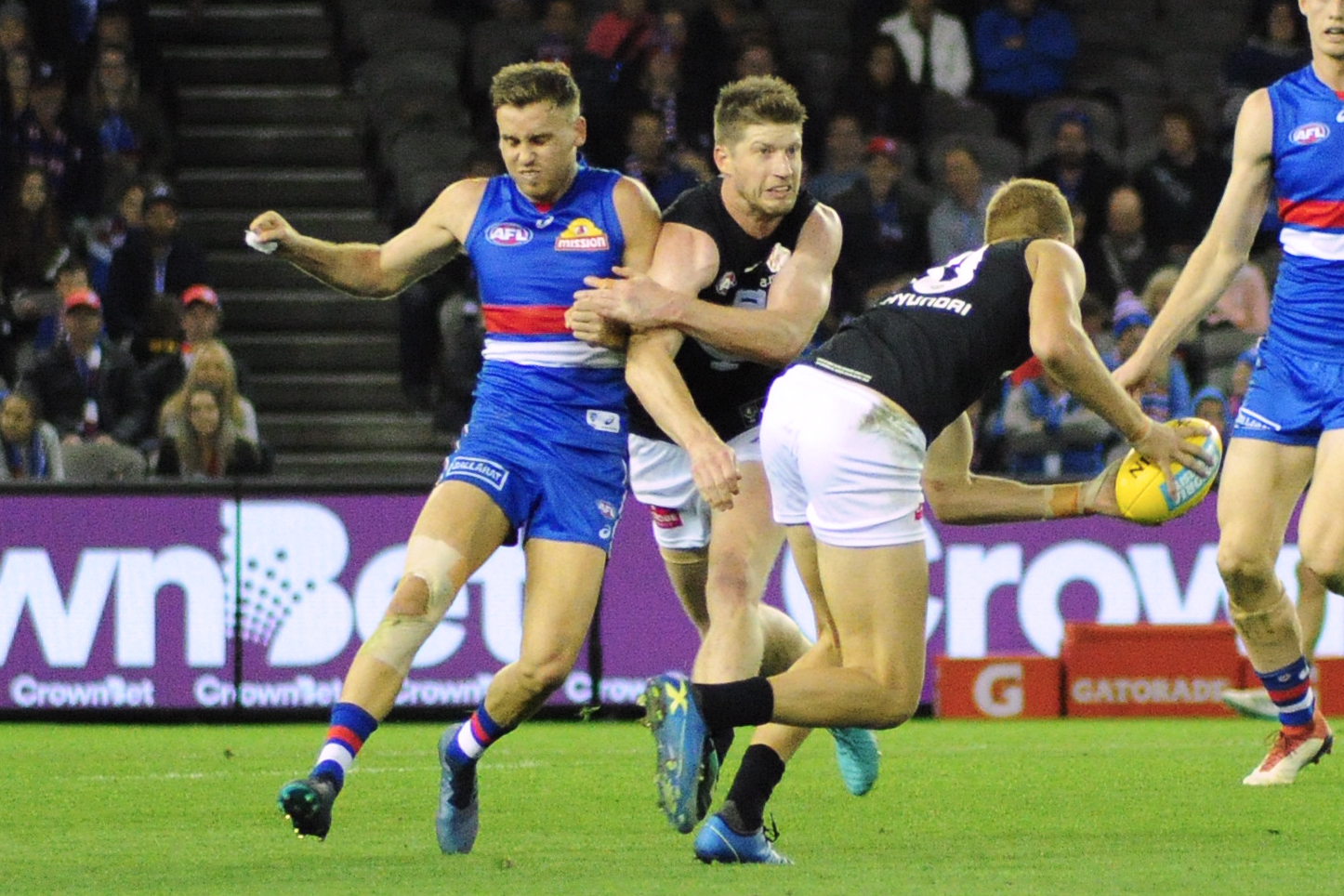
Carlton AFL player shepherding a Western Bulldogs opponent for a teammate in possession of the ball.

Shepherding is a tactic and skill in Australian rules football, a team sport. The term originates from the word shepherd, someone who influences the movement of sheep in a paddock. Using their body as an obstruction, Australian rules footballers can influence the movement of opponents, most often to prevent them from gaining possession or reaching the contest. This can be achieved legally while the ball is in play by a number of methods which include blocking, pushing or bumping. As shepherds are not counted in official statistics, it is classified as a "one percenter" skill but is an important aspect of team play to clear an attacking path for their team. According to the Laws of Australian Football, a player can shepherd an opposition player when the ball is within five metres, with the exception of contests where players contest the ball in the air, i.e. marking contests and ruck contests, or when the ball is not in play.

Australian rules does not allow forceful front-on contact, wrestling or charging. Players shepherding also cannot pushing from behind, make contact above the shoulders or below the knees, or strike with the head or limbs. Players also do not wear sufficient protective headwear for high speed collisions that can result in concussion inducing head injury and head clashes. Depending on the severity, an illegal shepherd, such as one in which a player is being held or has incidental illegal contact, is typically penalised by a free kick while those involving forceful impact including contact to the head can result in suspension.

Because players can shepherd a player who does not have possession the choice of "playing the man" and not the ball.

A strong and legal bump in Victorian Women's Football League. Both players have eyes for the ball, but player 18 uses their momentum and size to advantage, disrupting their opponent's player 3's balance to retrieve the disputed ball and gain possession.

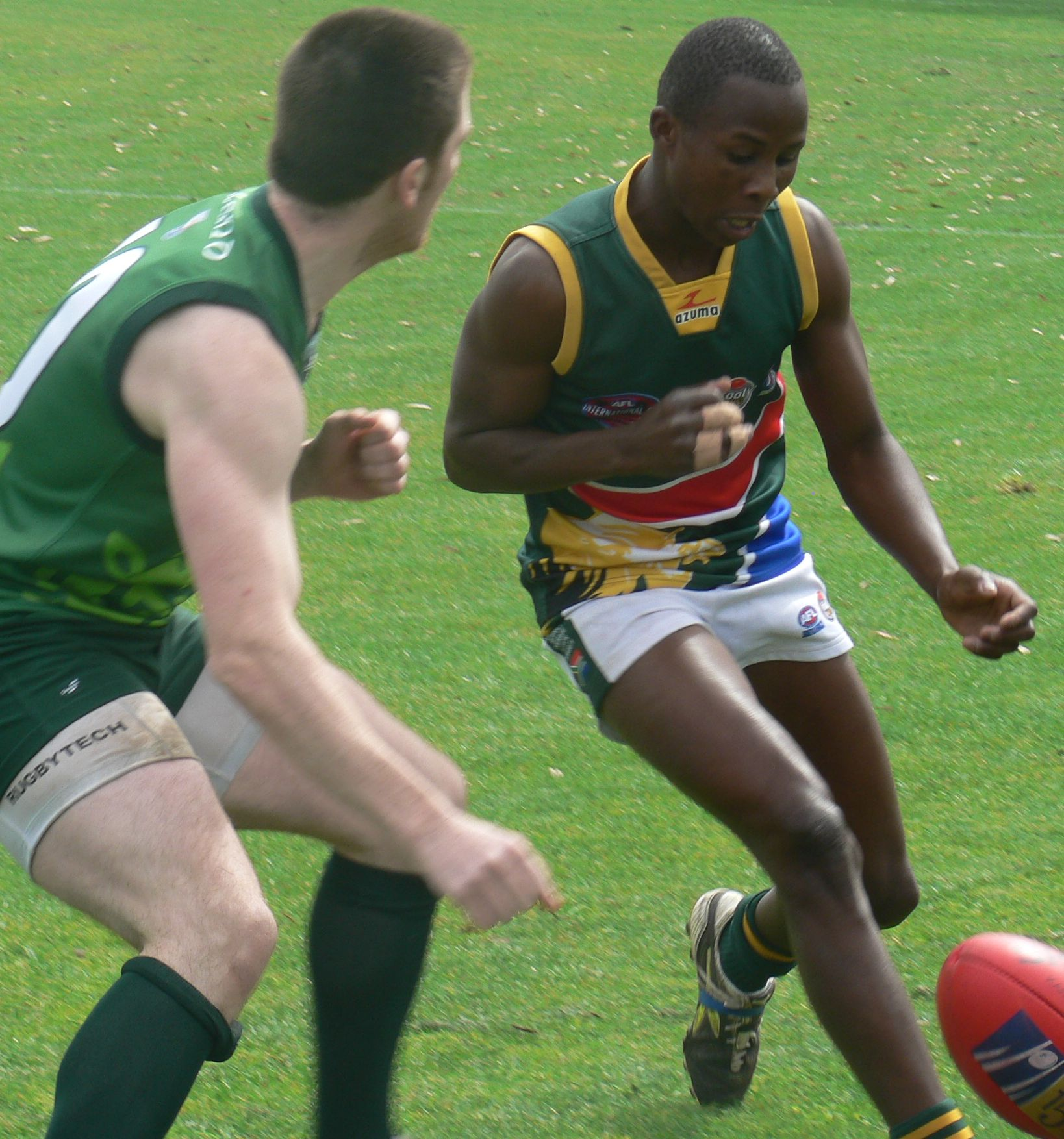
Players from the Irish national team (left) and South African national team (right) prepare to bump each other during the 2008 Australian Football International Cup. Both have elbows and shoulders tucked in to execute a legal bump.

== Controversy ==
=== Giansiracusa–Koschitzke Incident (2006) ===
In 2006, Justin Koschitzke was rendered unconscious by Daniel Giansiracusa with a legal hip and shoulder after both players accidentally clashed heads. Koschitzke appeared not to be aware of the oncoming Giansiracusa bump. However, the AFL tribunal later cleared Giansiracusa of any wrongdoing. Koschitzke was diagnosed with a fractured skull and was expected to miss 4–6 weeks. The incident sparked a media circus in many parts of Australia. This intensified when Koschitzke later dramatically fainted during a television interview. Many immediately assumed it was connected to the bump and head injury; however, subsequent brain scans found nothing abnormal. In future matches, Koschitzke wore a soft head padding to protect himself.

=== 2007 Rule Interpretations and Penalties ===
The league introduced further rule interpretations in 2006, highlighting these incidents as examples. It continues to be accused of inconsistency and a lack of clarity in the interpretation of such rules, particularly after a bump incident involving Collingwood's Alan Didak's elbow.

=== Ablett Jr.–Wirrpanda Incident (2008) ===
In 2008, during a match between Geelong and West Coast at Kardinia Park, Gary Ablett, Jr. executed an old fashioned front-on bump or shirtfront on David Wirrpanda as both players ran at full speed from opposite directions. Ablett flattened Wirrpanda with his hip and shoulder which appeared on video to be legal. Both players played on without visible injury. Later published photographs of the incident revealed head high contact during the shirtfront bump, Wirrpanda had slid to the ground causing incidental contact to be made to his head. The AFL match review panel ruled the severe impact of the collision as rough play and charged Ablett.

=== Maxwell–McGinnity Incident (2009) ===
Further controversy during the 2009 NAB Cup again brought the bump under scrutiny from the AFL match review panel. In a match between Collingwood and West Coast, Collingwood captain Nick Maxwell executed a side to front on bump on young opponent Patrick McGinnity as they contested the loose ball. Although McGinnity's head was not over the ball and he was within 5 metres of the ball so would have reasonably expected contact, Maxwell's copybook bump executed with the hip and shoulder resulted in an incidental clash of heads from the impact broke McGinnity's jaw and sideline him for up to 10 weeks. Some argued that Maxwell's eyes were taken off the ball, and that his sole intent was to take McGinnity out of play. The AFL Tribunal handed Maxwell a 4-week suspension ruling that Maxwell had a duty of care, even in a split second onfield decision to commit to a bump. Several media commentators including Mike Sheahan and AFL greats Kevin Bartlett and Nathan Buckley claimed that the decision brought into question the very fabric of the game and could set a precedent which would see the innate physicality and unpredictability which endears the game to spectators to be removed. However some, such as Rodney Eade defended the AFL's position. Collingwood launched a successful appeal, the only one under the current judicial system, and the decision was completely reversed.

=== Viney–Lynch Incident (2014) ===
Controversy surrounded an incident in Round 7, 2014 when Melbourne Football club player Jack Viney applied a bump on Adelaide Crows player Tom Lynch. Both players contested the ball from opposite directions. Viney arrived slightly later and as Lynch gained possession and was tackled by Alex Georgiou turning his body to protect himself from impact. The resulting collision, regarded by many as accidental, saw Lynch sandwiched between the two opponents and his head to clash with that of Gergiou, resulting in Lynch sustaining a broken jaw. Viney was referred straight to the tribunal, where he was suspended for two games, with the jury concluding that Viney could have avoided the collision. The Melbourne Football Club appealed the verdict, and the ruling was subsequently overturned. The decision attracted considerable media attention as many angered AFL fans expressed their concern for the spirit of the game.

=== Dangerfield–Kelly Incident (2021) ===
in Round 1, 2021, a bump by Brownlow medallist Geelong's Patrick Dangerfield on Adelaide's Jake Kelly and the following clash of heads resulted in concussion and broken nose to Kelly and a 3-match ban for Dangerfield for rough, reckless, high contact. Other than the accidental head clash, the bump appeared to be well executed, and inconsistency in the tribunal ruling had many commentators once again calling for it to be banned to eliminate the grey area around it.
