= New South Wales Football Association =

- Most recent season or competition: 1894
- Formerly: Sydney Football Association (1882)
- Sport: Australian rules football
- Founded: 31 August 1880; 146 years ago
- First season: 1881
- Folded: 1894; 132 years ago
- No. of teams: 5
- Region: Sydney, New South Wales
- Last champion: Redfern (1894)
- Most titles: Sydney Football Club (7)

The New South Wales Football Association was the governing body for Australian rules football in New South Wales between 1880 and 1893. It oversaw an Australian rules competition based in Sydney and governed the Laws of Australian Football in the colony. Matches were mostly played at Moore Park in Sydney. The competition is a predecessor to the current AFL Sydney, with some clubs, notably Sydney and East Sydney being reformed as foundation clubs of that competition in 1903. The game's early presence in Sydney is poorly documented, partly due to the bitter distaste that the Sydney media's displayed toward the Victorian code.

The first grade competition was known as the Flanagan Cup. Around 5 clubs competing simultaneously at any point the league's history. Many other clubs, particularly the Catholic schools participated in the association's junior grades.

== Background ==
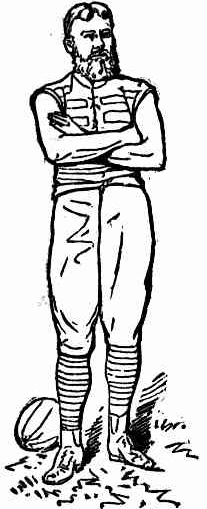
Harry Hedger former Waratahs Southern Rugby Union player who helped found the NSWFA

Harry Hedger and George Walker, rugby players of the Waratah Football Club were among the first to agitate for the adoption of Australian rules in New South Wales, citing the enormous popularity of the code in the rival colony of Victoria. Having learned the game playing test matches against the Carlton Football Club of Melbourne in 1877 many others urged others to put aside their intercolonial rivalry and take up the sport.At the same time the Sydney University FC (rugby rules club) was advocating for the Southern Rugby Football Union (now the NSWRU) and its member clubs to switch codes to Australian rules.

Some players, I am aware, can't swallow the idea of adopting the Victorian Game, simply because it is supposed to hail from the sister colony.

— Reporter, The Sydney Mail

In late June 1880 a large group of rugby players, dissatisfied with the British game's rules, gathered to form a new body (the NSWFA) that would adopt the Victorian rules. There was considerable opposition in the Sydney football community to a Victorian Rules association being established. However A. II. Gregory and G. A. Crisp called a meeting in Woollahra in 1880 with such a goal in mind.

The two founding member clubs were Sydney and East Sydney, formed on 7 August 1880. The first season commenced in 1881. The body saw it necessary to make rule changes to appeal to rugby followers, in particular, was vocal on the necessity of a Push in the back rule to reduce the game's roughness and make it more appealing to rugby players.

By 1883 there were 9 clubs in the association. Among the clubs that were formed were West Sydney, South Sydney, City, Our Boys, Granville, Wallsend, Merewether, Hamilton, St Ignatius' College and St Joseph's College along with Balmain and Woollahra formed a year later. In 1882 the Waratah FC formalised into a new club and switched codes, and the Sydney University ANFC joined the association in 1887.

The NSWFA began a sharp decline in interest from 1890 which Healy (2022) attributes to a combination of the departure of the president and Cricket Phillip Sheridan (trustee of what is now the Sydney Cricket Ground) and an Australian economic depression leaving the association without access to enclosed grounds. Poor management also impacted the long term sustainabililty of the competition.

The Southern Rugby Football Union (SRFU) instituted a ban on rugby players from playing Australian rules which impacted playing numbers. By 1893 there were insufficient clubs left to continue the competition, however, games between Sydney, West Sydney, East Sydney, Redfern, and a newly founded Darlington team were organised by the Association and played in 1894. With Redfern winning the last premiership.

== Clubs ==
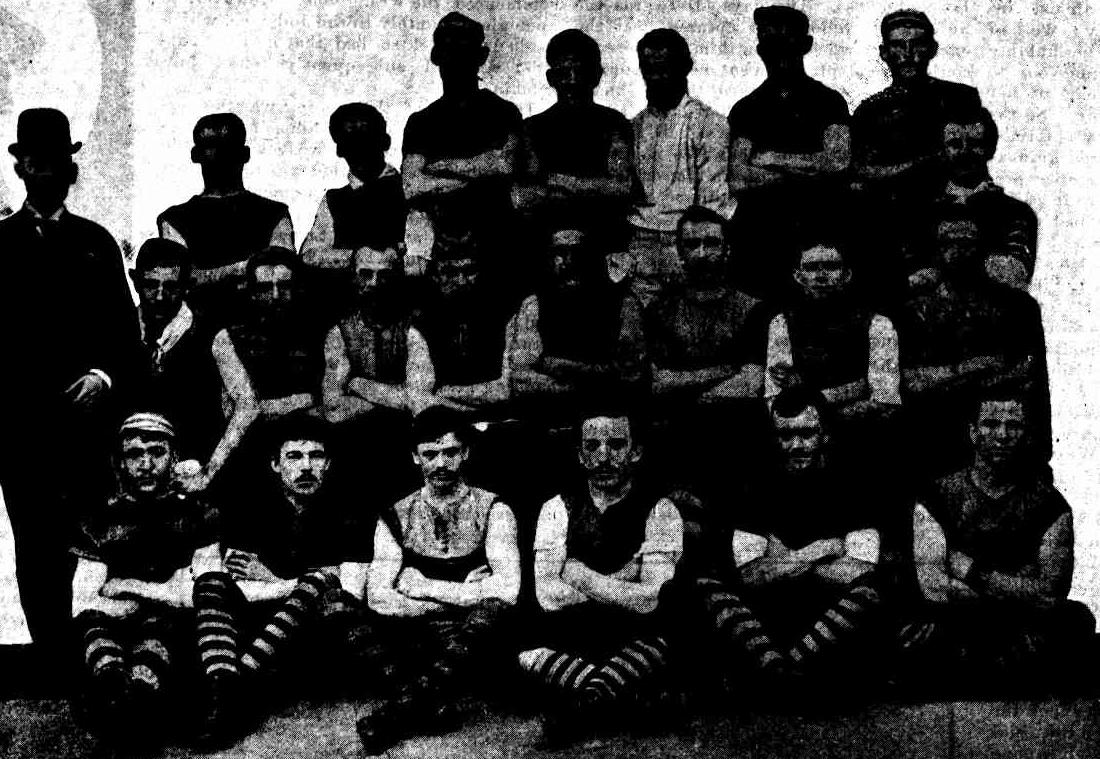
Waratah Football Club in 1890; the club was pivotal in the revival of Australian rules in Sydney from the 1870s

Club	Formed	Earliest Year	Latest Year	Notes/References
Sydney	1880 (7 August)	1881	1894	
East Sydney	1880 (7 August)	1881	1894	
Petersham		1882		
Maitland		1882		
Waratah	1873 (as rugby club)	1882		
Balmain	1881	1881		
Woollahra	1881	1881		
West Sydney		1882	1894	
South Sydney		1882		
City		1883		
Our Boys		1883		
Granville		1883		
Wallsend		1883		
Merewther		1883		
Hamilton		1883		
St Ignatius College		1883		
St Joseph's College		1883		
Sydney University Football Club	1865	1887		
Kogarah	1887	1887		
Redfern			1894	
Darlington	1894	1894	1894	

== List of premiers ==
Season	Premiers	Runners Up
1881	East Sydney (1)	Sydney
1882	Sydney (1)	No Runners Up
1883	Sydney (2)	No Runners Up
1884	East Sydney (2)	No Runners Up
1885	Wallsend (1)	No Runners Up
1886	Sydney (3)	No Runners Up
1887	Sydney (4)	No Runners Up
1888	Sydney (5)	East Sydney
1889	Sydney (6)	Waratah
1890	Waratah (1)	Sydney
1891	West Sydney (1)	Waratah
1892	Sydney (7)	West Sydney
1893	West Sydney (2)	Sydney
1894	Redfern (1)	Sydney
