= Spectacular mark =

Type of mark in Australian rules football

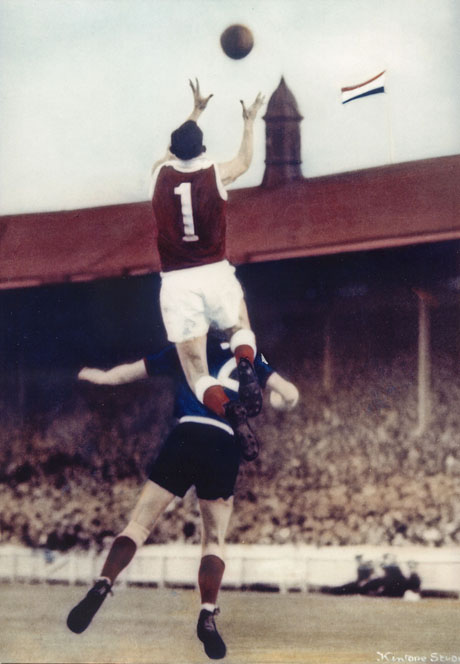
Ian McKay of North Adelaide leaps for a spectacular mark during the 1952 SANFL Grand Final against Norwood at Adelaide Oval.

A spectacular mark (also known as a specky, speckie, speccy, screamer or hanger) is a mark (or catch) in Australian rules football that typically involves a player jumping up on the back of another player.

The spectacular mark has become a much celebrated aspect of the sport. Many of the winners of the Australian Football League's annual Mark of the Year competition could be considered 'speckies', and commentators will often call an individual specky "a contender" in reference to this competition and the mark's likeliness to win it.

== History ==
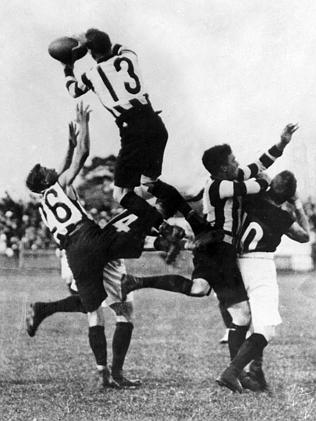
Dick Lee, 1914

Up until the early 1870s, Australian football was typically played low to the ground in congested rugby-style packs, and as such, marks were generally taken on the chest. Occasional high marks were recorded; as early as 1862 a Melbourne Football Club player was praised for leaping "wonderfully high into the air" to mark the ball. Spectacular marks became more common in the 1880s, a time in which the game's style of play opened up and teams adopted positional structures resembling those in use today. Essendon's Charlie "Commotion" Pearson was a prominent high-flyer of this period. An 1886 match report captured the excitement his aerial skills were generating: "Mr Pearson ... gave spectators many thrilling moments with his phenomenal leaps skyward. What a thrill the game would become as a spectacle if all players tried out this new idea." Albert Thurgood was a later exponent at the turn of the century. It was only when the push-in-the-back rule was introduced in 1897 that high-flyers were protected from being pushed in mid air. This prevented potential serious injury.

In the 1900s, an "unintentional interference" (incidental contact) rule (i.e. jumping on an opponent's back in an effort to mark the ball in the air is not considered a push), first introduced by the VFL in 1904, reached widespread adoption by the Australasian Football Council in 1907. This paved the way for forwards to climb up opposition players' backs to take spectacular marks.

Dick Lee consistently pulled down high marks in the early 1900s. In South Australia, Harold Oliver was considered the best exponent of the high-flying mark prior to World War I. In the 1920s, Roy Cazaly was a frequent exponent, as was Bob Pratt in the 1930s. In the 1940s, John Coleman was known for his high marking. In the 1970s, Paul Vander Haar and Peter Knights were renowned for their aerial prowess.

The 1980s saw an era of increased professionalism including the use of the ruck pad in training, as well as long direct kicking, combining to produce more aerial feats. Several players in this decade would consistently take spectacular marks, including Gary Ablett Snr and Trevor Barker. It also became common for exponents of the spectacular mark to achieve extra elevation by levering or propping the hands or arms off the shoulders of opponents. Warwick Capper was a regular proponent of this technique. According to the strict interpretation of the rules, this is in fact illegal interference. Sometimes, however, umpires would interpret in favour of the marking player if the interference was minor and deemed to be part of the jumping action. The AFL Rules Committee in 2007 effectively disallowed this type of spectacular mark altogether with a polarizing adjustment of the "hands-on-the-back" rule. The intention was that players would use vertical leap only; however, it did not increase the frequency of spectacular marks and resulted in many more frustrating free kicks. Many players use their arms and hands to balance naturally while in the air to gain greater height without pushing their opponent. As a result, the AFL relaxed this interpretation again in 2018.

== In popular culture ==
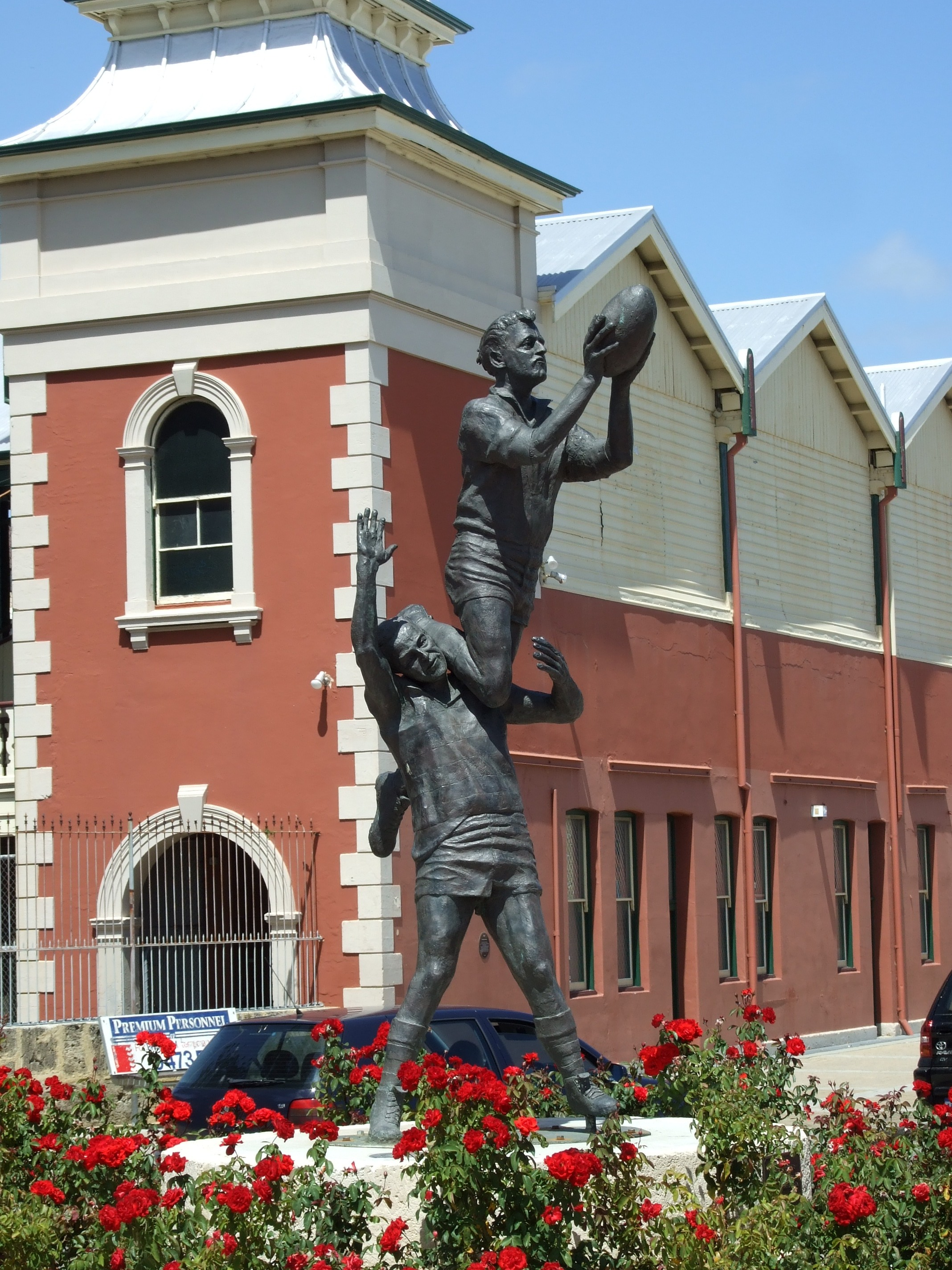
Statue by Robert Hitchcock outside Fremantle Oval of South Fremantle's John Gerovich taking a "specky" over East Fremantle's Ray French in the 1956 WANFL preliminary final

The specky has been widely celebrated in Australian popular culture. The phrase "the big men fly" is invariably used to describe speckies and ruckmen contesting a ball-up, and has even spawned a play of the same name, written by Alan Hopgood and first staged in 1963. Alex Jesaulenko's famous specky in the 1970 VFL Grand Final gave rise to the catchphrase "Jesaulenko, You Beauty!". Songs such as Mike Brady's "Up There Cazaly" (1979) also celebrate the popular spectator phenomenon. In his poem "The High Mark", Bruce Dawe sees the specky as an expression of the human aspiration to fly. The poem ends with a footballer falling "back to Earth"—a "guernseyed Icarus".

There is also a popular series of football-themed children's novels, co-written by Felice Arena and AFL star Garry Lyon, named Specky Magee.

== Stepladder and springboard ==
In Australian slang, a stepladder describes the player over whom another player marks to take a specky. In the past, full-backs have been renowned for inadvertently acting as stepladders.

Some players have achieved fame for their role as stepladders of famous marks, including Graeme "Jerker" Jenkin, who was the stepladder for Alex Jesaulenko's mark in the 1970 VFL Grand Final. Melbourne band TISM wrote the 1986 song "The Back Upon Which Jezza Jumped" about him.

Strong full-backs Gary Pert, Mick Martyn, Chris Langford and Matthew Scarlett have been stepladders for speckies on multiple occasions.

Warren Tredrea was the stepladder of a rare Grand Final spectacular mark taken by Paul Chapman in the 2007 AFL Grand Final.

In some rare cases, a would-be stepladder becomes a springboard when the marking player gets a secondary boost off another player. A famous example is a 2001 Essendon–Western Bulldogs game where Essendon's Gary Moorcroft took Mark of the Year by using Western Bulldogs' Brad Johnson as a springboard, a mark which many consider to be the greatest mark of all time.

== Gallery ==
Spectacular marks
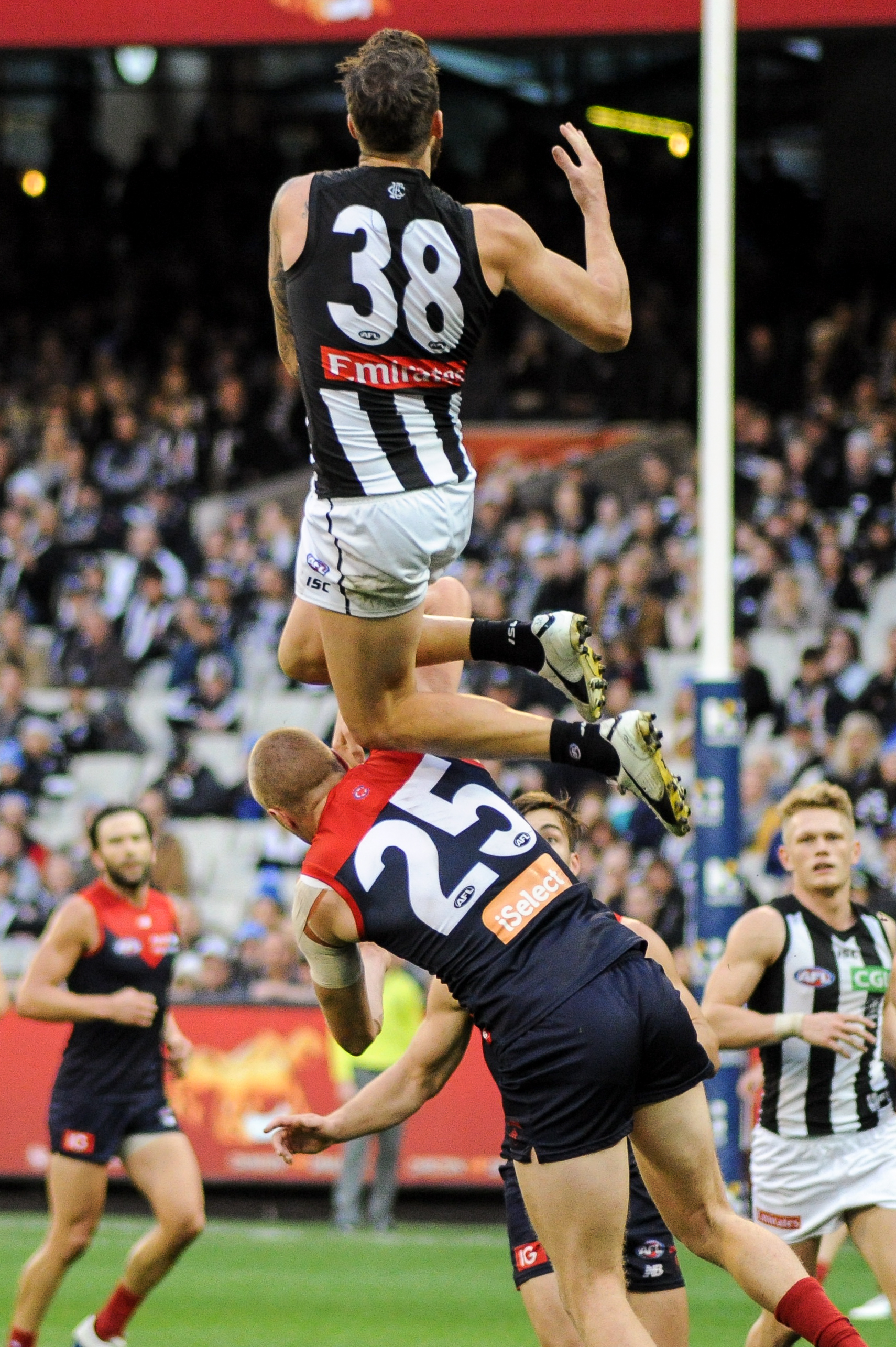
Jeremy Howe of Collingwood taking a spectacular mark in 2017.

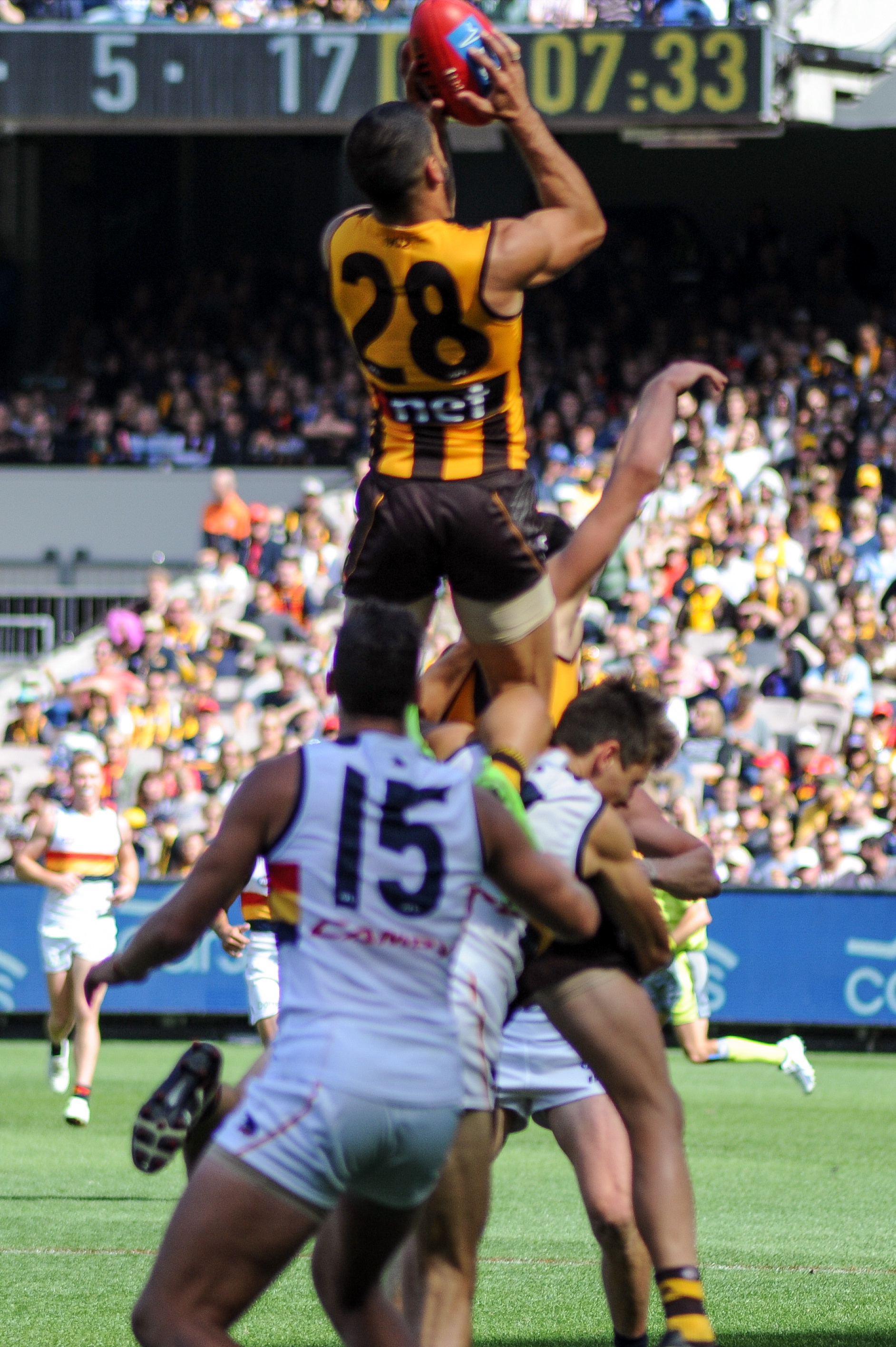
Paul Puopolo of Hawthorn taking a spectacular mark in 2017.

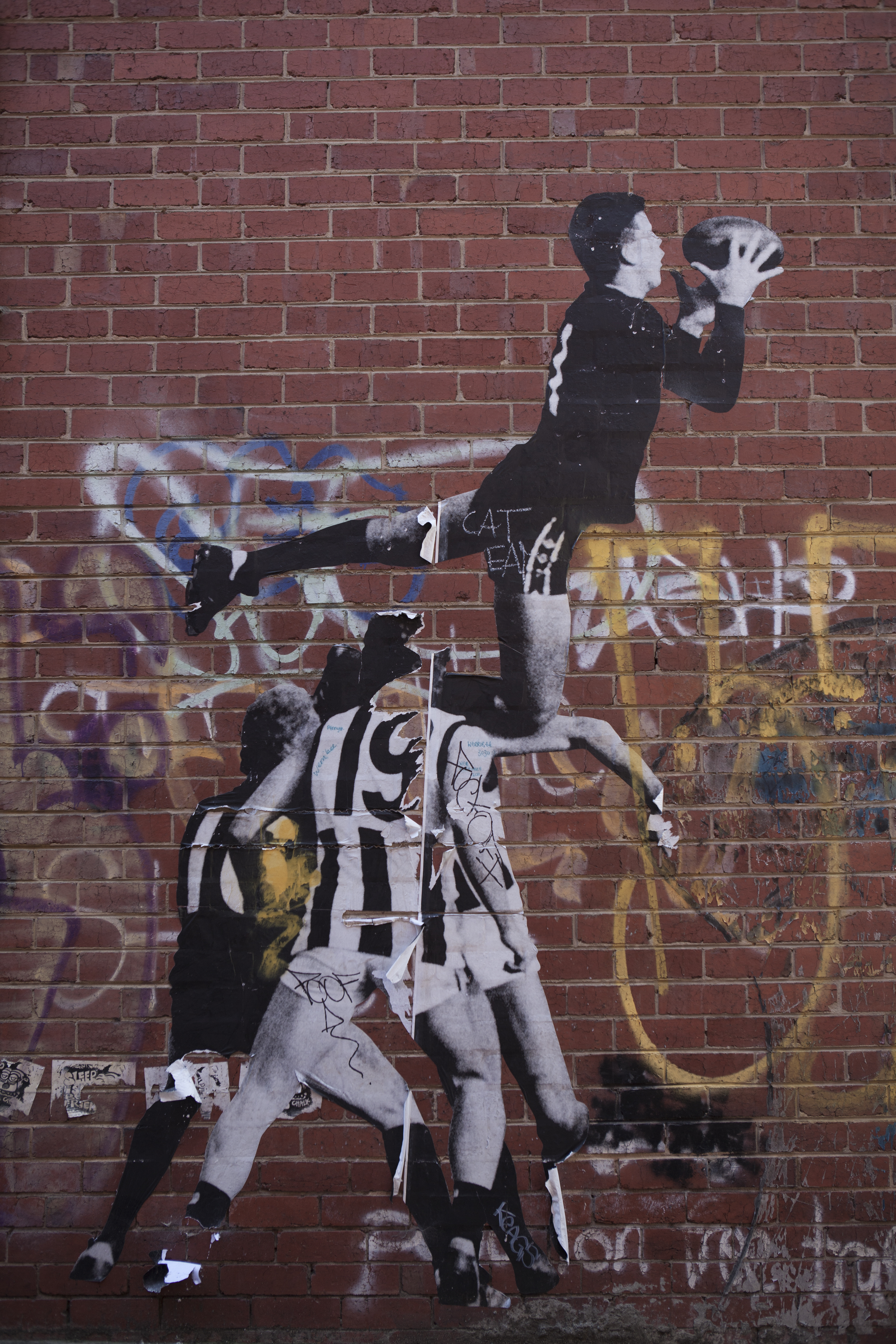
Stencil of Stephen Silvagni from Carlton taking the Mark of the Year in 1988.

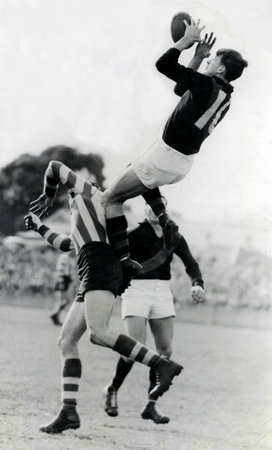
John Coleman of Essendon takes a spectacular mark over North Melbourne full-back Vic Lawrence in 1953.

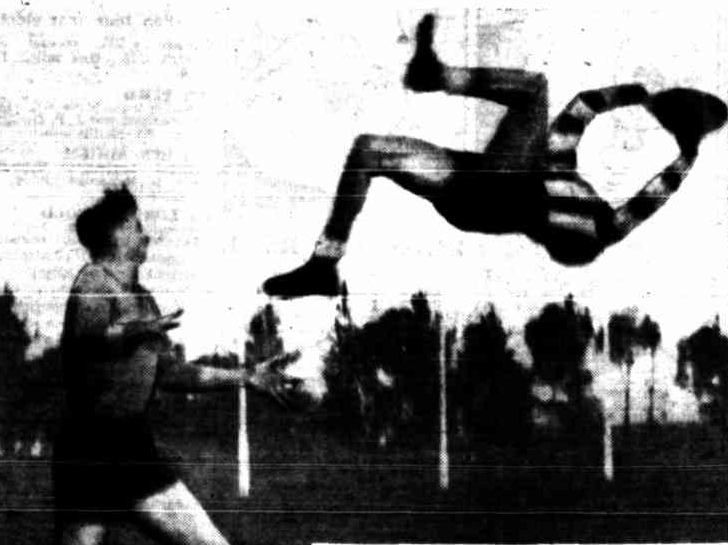
Barry King takes a spectacular mark in 1948

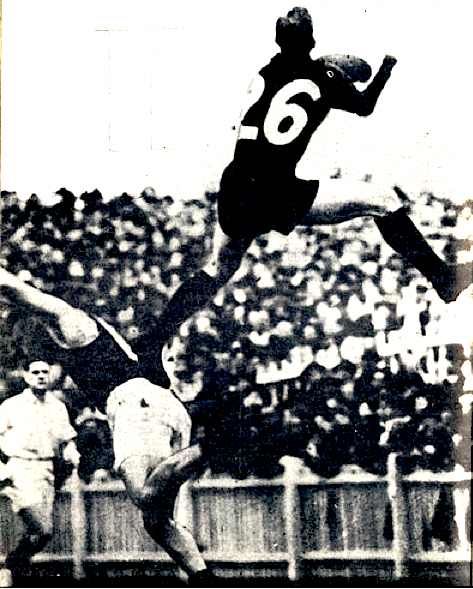
Jim Park of Carlton taking a spectacular mark in 1938.

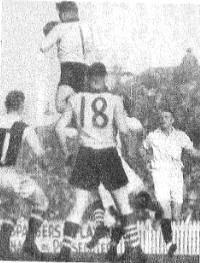
Laurie Nash of Sydney taking a spectacular mark in 1937

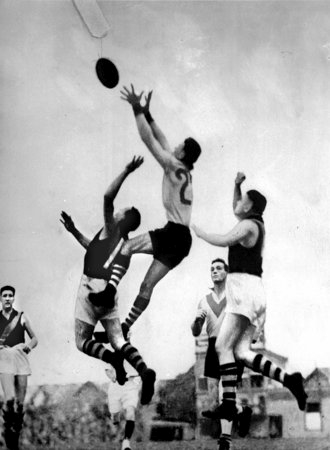
Bob Pratt taking a spectacular mark in 1934

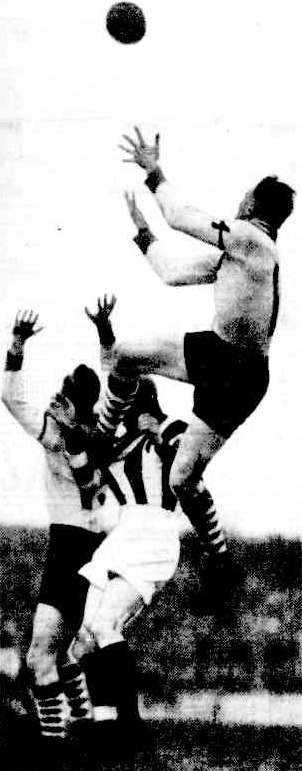
Bob Pratt taking a spectacular mark in 1935

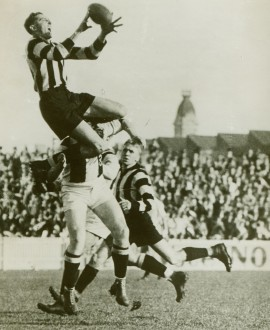
Ron Todd of Collingwood taking a spectacular mark in the 1930s
