= Push in the back =

Free kick awarded in Australian rules football

A push in the back (colloquially "in the back") is a free kick awarded in Australian rules football against a player who illegally tackles or interferes with a player from behind when contesting possession.

Due to the lack of an offside rule, with the exception of when a free kick or mark is paid players can be challenged from any direction at any time not always with full awareness of their opponent's positioning, potentially disadvantaging those playing in front whole sole intention is gaining possession.

The rule is applied in two different circumstances: when the ball carrier is tackled and marking contests.

While it was widely introduced in 1897, the rule is as almost old as the sport with its necessity to ensure the safety of players having been debated since 1860.

== Push in the Back: Tackle ==
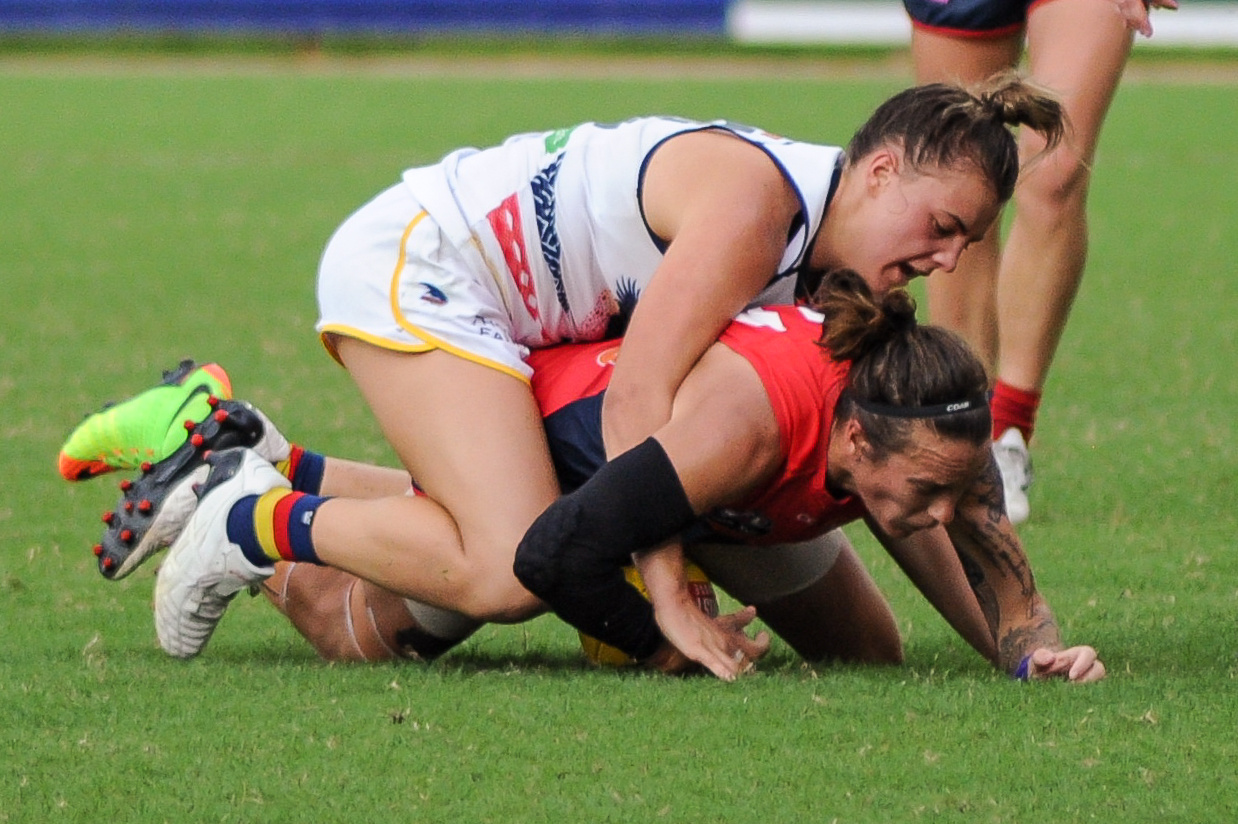
A Melbourne FC player is pushed in the back (into the ground) during a tackle by an Adelaide FC opponent in an AFL Women's match.

A tackler, loosely speaking, is not allowed to push an opposition player in the back during a tackle. By the strictest definition of a push, any contact from behind could be considered a push in the back, so the rule is usually enforced under only the following three circumstances:

- If a player is bent over or on his knees, usually to win or protect the football, and an opponent knocks them over from behind.
- If a player is lying face down on the ground, and an opponent falls onto his back, intentionally or unintentionally. The first circumstance often directly causes this second circumstance also.
- If a tackler pursuing a ball-carrier uses one or both hands to push them from behind, causing them to be knocked off-balance as he attempts to dispose of the ball. A chaser often attempts this when he sees that the ball-carrier is about to kick the ball, and he is not close enough for a tackle.

While the second and third circumstances are objectively applied by umpires, there is some subjectivity concerning the first interpretation. This arises because a bent-over player can be easily knocked over by incidental contact, forcing the umpire to make a judgement call regarding whether or not he considers the push to be sufficiently substantial to warrant penalty. Furthermore, it is not uncommon to see a player "take a dive" when he feels contact from behind, and umpires will not pay a free kick if they believe this to be the case. Nevertheless, it is relatively easy for fans to predict when these free kicks are going to be paid. Umpires are much less lenient if a player pushes another near the boundary line, due to the increased danger of crashing into the fence.

== Push in the Back: Marking contest ==
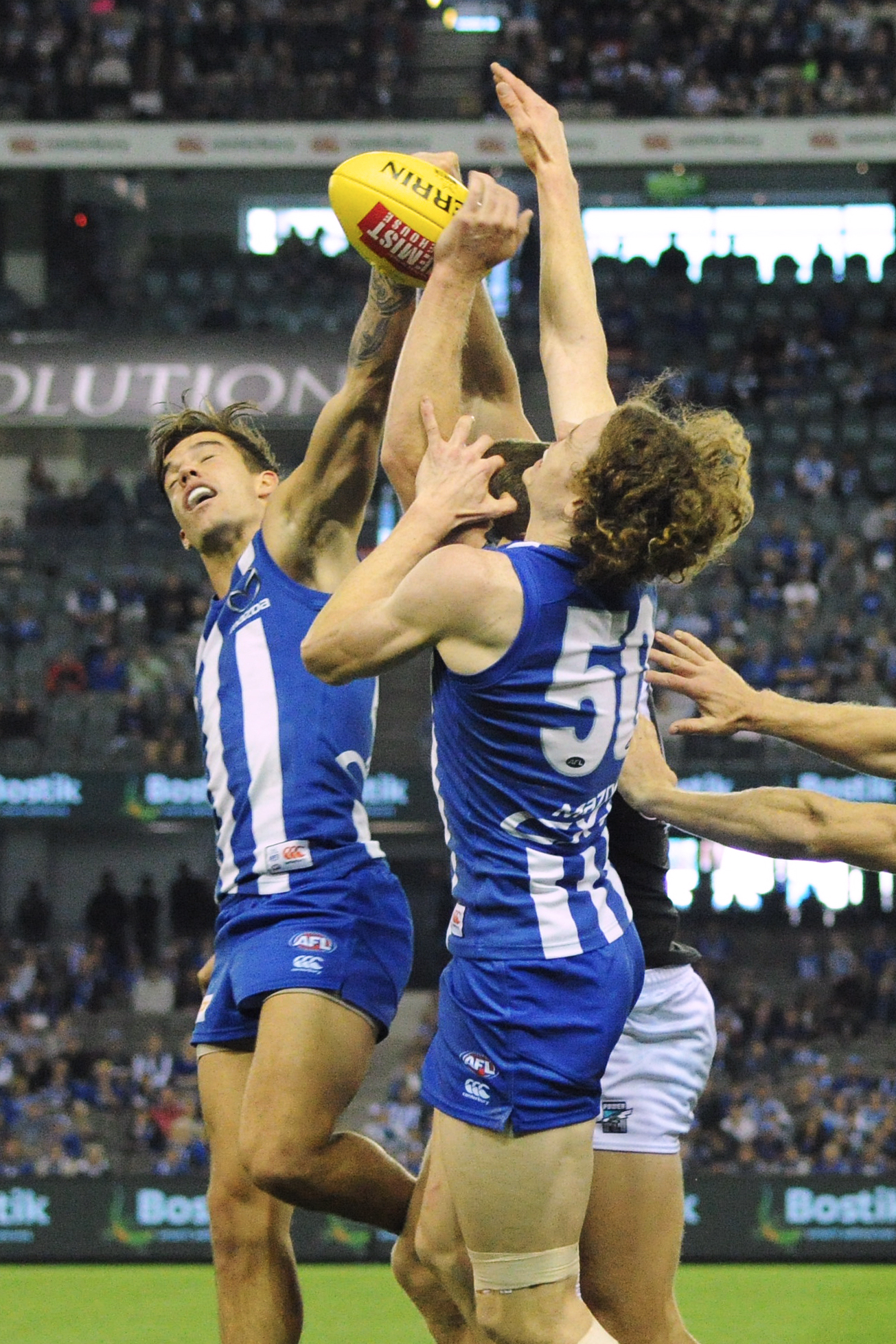
A Port Adelaide FC player appears to be illegally pushed from behind by a North Melbourne FC opponent while jumping for the ball while others attempt to legally spoil the mark.

One of the rules introduced by the VFL when they split from the VFA 1897 was the protection of a player who jumped for a mark from being put off balance by a player pushing them from behind. Pushes in the back are usually paid under the following three circumstances.

- If a player pushes an opponent who has jumped to take a mark.
- If a player on the lead is put off-balance by contact from behind with the arms of an opponent.
- If a player in a pack or standing one-on-one marking contest is pushed out from behind, with the use of the hands.

Free kicks under the first circumstance are easy to spot and are always paid, because a player already in the air cannot take a dive when pushed. However, under the other two circumstances, making judgement calls can be very difficult: it is easy for a player to take a dive in these circumstances; a sprinting player who is pushed may, in the act of trying to fall safely, take an unnatural leap which inadvertently makes the play look like a deliberate dive. As such, paying free kicks for pushes in the back in marking contests has always been contentious.

However, these pushes are all caused by the arms. Players in marking contests are allowed to push their opponents out of the contest with their bodies, within reason; so, a subtle nudge with the shoulder would not be penalised, but a full-blooded bump in the back would be penalised.

=== "Hands in the Back" (2007) ===
In 2007, the AFL introduced an interpretation of the push in the back in marking contests, referred to as hands in the back. Under the rule, any player who placed his hands upon an opponent's back in a marking contest, whether there was a visible push or not, would be penalised.

The rule was introduced after a 2006 season, in which there was an increasing tendency for forwards to play from behind in standing one-on-one marking contests, using their hands or bodies to nudge their opponents under the ball. It has become very difficult to adjudicate whether or not these nudges should be penalised, and there was a high degree of inconsistency. The AFL introduced the hands in the back rule to remove the subjectivity of these calls: in other words, a push with the body/forearms/closed hand was fine, but a push with open hands was not, regardless of the strength of the push.

The rule has encountered a wide range of problems, with two particularly notable ones.

- Players were being penalised because they were unable to use their hands to protect their positions, or even feel the position of their opponent while their eyes were on the ball.
- Umpires were frequently caught in the wrong position to see hands in the back calls, so the application of the rule ended up just as inconsistent as the previous season.

There were repeated calls for the rule to be repealed, even midseason, and there has been much criticism of the AFL for introducing the rule into the regular season without trialling it first in the NAB Cup. The AFL has stated that the rule would remain beyond 2007, and fans' angst decreased as the season progressed, and as players became used to working within the interpretation.

=== Removal of "Hands in the Back" rule (2019) ===
Through the Laws of the Game committee, the rule was scrapped for the 2019 season. The decision to remove the rule has since been criticised as more and more obvious pushes were not being penalised. Gerard Healy labelled the removal of the rule "a blight on the game".

== Signal ==
The umpire signals a push in the back by holding both hands open, palms facing outwards, in front of his chest, then making a pushing motion outwards with them. However, his action often reflects the push which is being penalised so a push in a marking contest will see the umpire push his hands outwards, while driving a player into the ground will see the arms pushed further downwards.

== History ==
The idea of a Push in the Back rule has its origins in the 1860s just one year after the first Melbourne Football Club rules (Laws of Australian rules football) were published. Proponents of rugby football, in particular, felt that the practice of pushing a player from behind was unsportsmanlike and especially dangerous. With the Australian rules lacking an offside and defensive and offensive lines, rugby players in general play did not need as much positional awareness of players behind them. Among the earlier advocates of the rule change was the South Yarra Football Club possibly the first club to have such a rule, however its introduction was deemed unnecessary and was voted down at the first committee meeting. In the early days many serious injuries resulted from players being pushed while contesting the ball, and its practice in marking contests discouraged players from attempting high marks. One of the commonly cited reasons for its rejection is the difficulty in officiating was seen to outweigh the benefit.

The Ballarat Football Club enforced such a rule in 1872. The club staunchly defended its rule despite calls to fall in line with the Melbourne Football Club's rules. In 1874 in matches against the Melbourne Football Club it succeeded in having the visiting club agree to a no pushing from behind rule. The rule was then debated by clubs at a 1874 conference but was again voted down. Ballarat continued to enforce the law on visiting clubs for decades.

By 1876, South Australian leagues, also playing under their own rules, began to outlaw the practice in marking contests. The South Australian Football Association, the first governing body for Australian rules football in South Australia was the colonial body to outlaw the practice in its official rules in April 1877. However Victorian clubs still allowed the practice and players accepted it as part of the game and when South Australia agreed in 1877 to adopt the Victorian rules to participate in representative matches against Victoria, due to strong pressure from the Victorians they compromised to allow players to be pushed from behind.

In 1877, Sydney rugby club Waratah, playing an intercolonial against the Carlton Football Club pointed out the unfairness of the practice and the advantage it gave to their Victorian opponents as something that rugby fans in the colony would not stomach.

During the 1870s the lack of the rule was a major incumbrance for the game in Queensland and New South Wales, both early adopters of the code. In these colonies rugby was increasing in popularity and its proponents argued that without the Push in the Back rule, their game was much safer to play than the Victorian code.

Elsewhere in practice, however its use as a tactic was increasing and in the late 1870s umpires in Victoria (specifically of the Geelong Football Club) began to penalise it with free kicks despite the absence of an official rule.

In 1880, the New South Wales Football Association was formed becoming the first governing body for Australian rules football in New South Wales. As part of its first set of rules, it ignored the Victorian rules and sought to ban pushing from behind in any form, a move which was more popular with rugby fans. The NSWFA believed that the Victorian league would follow its lead to "reduce the game's roughness", however it did not. Subsequent appeals by Victorian members to repeal the NSW law were rejected.

In Queensland the practice was hugely unpopular and by 1882 had caused building resentment toward the code. Local clubs including the Brisbane Football Club had for years unsuccessfully lobbied the Victorian Football Association (VFA), whose rules it had affiliated with, to ban pushes from behind in an effort to improve its safety and fairness in comparison to rugby. The VFA's reluctance to listen to the Queenslanders eventually helped created a rift which saw the formation of a local governing body for rugby, mass switching of codes by schools, clubs and players and the decline of the sport in the colony. Clubs outside of Brisbane lost patience with the Victorian governing body and in early 1884 clubs in Toowoomba began banning the practice and began lobbying other QFA clubs to follow suit. In 1884 the QFA in response finally went against the VFA's advice and passed a push in the back rule, however the mass exodus to rugby had already begun a month earlier.

South Australian leagues began agitating for the change to what was considered by far the most dangerous aspect of the game. Deliberate pushing in the back by unspirited clubs was seen as a blight on the game by South Australians. As such, representative matches in South Australia frequently rejected the Victorian rule allowing pushing.

It wasn't until the early 1880s that the Victorian media began labelling pushing in marking contests as an unfair practice. Between 1885 and 1887 high marking was becoming popular in Victoria. Following a conference with intercolonial delegates in 1885 the first restrictions on pushing were introduced by the Victorian Football Association "only when the player is running within five or six yards of the ball", a rule used for some time by and pushed for by Geelong. Delegates from other colonies and umpires were not satisfied and the following year in 1886 successfully pushed that Rule 16 ban the practice of pushing altogether for intercolonial matches however the VFA and Tasmanian leagues, the last in the country to allow it continued to follow the 1885 rules. In 1886 two Tasmanian football deaths were directly attributed to the practice so the colony adopted the new rule and its intercolonial delegates pleaded for the Victorians to follow suit.

At a meeting of the Australasian Football Council in 1890 a motion was passed banning pushing in the back in a marking contest which was agreed to by its member leagues including Victoria.

After decades of controversy a rule against pushing for both marking and "running with the ball" was finally adopted in 1897 by the newly formed Victorian Football League.

In the 1900s, an incidental contact rule (i.e. jumping on an opponent's back in an effort to mark the ball in the air is not considered a push) was introduced first by the VFL in 1904 which reached widespread adoption by the Australasian Football Council in 1907. Allowing incidental contact ushered in an era of spectacular marking which further increased the code's appeal.

== Controversial Push in the Back incidents ==
The following push in the back incidents caused significant controversy:

- Round 9, 2007 - with the scores tied between Essendon and Richmond and with about three minutes to go, Matthew Richardson nudged Mal Michael out of a standing one-on-one marking contest, using his right hand on Michael's right shoulder blade. Michael, who was in front but slightly out of position, jumped to take the mark exactly as he was pushed, but missed the ball; Richardson took the mark and played on immediately, kicking the ball between the goal posts from 50m out, but was penalised for a push in the back, plus fifty metres for wasting time. The Tigers lost the game, and widespread debate about the hands in the back interpretation followed in the next week.
- Round 4, 2022 - Geelong's Tom Hawkins kicked a match winning goal after a "blatant" push with both hands on Brisbane Lions opponent Harris Andrews, ruled as "standing his ground". The decision drew substantial criticism and Hawkins himself admitted that he should have been penalised.
- Preliminary Final, 2022 - Sydney Swans forward Tom Papley kicked a match winning goal after a push from behind with both hands on Darcy Moore described as "forward craft".
