= Charlie Pearson =

Australian rules footballer

Charlie Pearson was an Australian rules footballer who played with Essendon during the 1880s. He is credited as being one of the first people to attempt high flying marks where a player jumps on the back of another in order to take a mark. Nicknamed the Commotion, he was considered one of the finest players of his era.

Due to his work at a rural sheep station in Queensland he only played sporadically for Essendon. In the 1920s, he was reported to be managing a cattle station in Argentina.
