= Chicken wing tackle =

Move in Australian rules football, rugby league and rugby union

A chicken wing tackle is a move in Australian rules football and rugby league, in which a player locks an opponent's arm so that he or she cannot legally move the ball. It is a controversial move that has injured players and resulted in fines and suspensions for players performing the tackle. The phrase was coined by Fox Sports NRL Producer Geoff Bullock (a.k.a. Bluey) in 2008. Australian rules players are particularly vulnerable due to the swinging arm motion of the handball as a primary method of passing. A chicken wing tackle can pull a player's arm in such a way as to hyperextend arm and shoulder joints, causing the potential for painful dislocation.

== Rugby league ==
Melbourne Storm forward Adam Blair was found guilty of committing a chicken wing tackle in an Australian Rugby League match against Brisbane Broncos in April 2008. A former Melbourne Storm player, of Hull Kingston Rovers in the Super League was fined £300 after performing the tackle, with a disciplinary panel finding him guilty of "behaviour contrary to the true spirit of the game by making a dangerous tackle".

== Australian rules football ==
The use of the chicken wing tackle in the Australian Football League is generally considered to have been picked up from National Rugby League. In Australian rules, the motion of preparing to handball is such that there is an opportunity for the tackler can grab and pin the punching arm when it is behind the player's back. This leaves the player in possession exposed to serious shoulder injury. It became a controversy after Kangaroos' skipper Brent Harvey was chicken winged in 2009 during an Australian football match and suffered a dislocated elbow that caused him to miss months of play. The tackle has been furiously slammed by some saying it must be banned. AFL umpires manager Jeff Gieschen in 2009 stated that he was confident the practice would not become commonplace.

Notable incidents:

- 2009 AFL season - Richmond's Daniel Jackson chicken wing on North Melbourne captain Brent Harvey labelled an accident by AFL tribunal.
- 2012 AFL season - Carlton captain Chris Judd chicken winged North player Leigh Adams. Judd was widely criticised in the media for this action and was cited for misconduct by the Match Review Panel. He was subsequently suspended for 4 games by the tribunal.
- 2015 AFL season - Joel Selwood was suspended for one week for chicken winging Sam Wright.
- 2019 AFL season - Jack Riewoldt fined for chicken wing on Bayley Fritsch.
- 2022 AFL season - Sam Switkowski suspended for 2 weeks for chicken winging Jack Ginnivan. Jack Ginnivan cleared of chicken wing against Patrick Dangerfield.
