= Sydney Football Club (NSWAFL) =

Sydney Naval

Names
- Full name: Sydney Naval Football Club
- Nickname: Redlegs

Club details
- Founded: 7 August 1880; 146 years ago
- Dissolved: 28 October 1971; 55 years ago
- Colours: Red & Navy
- Competition: NSWFA (1880-1894), NSWANFL (1903-1971)
- Premierships: NSWFA (7): 1882; 1883; 1886; 1887; 1888; 1889; 1892; NSWANFL (10): 1905; 1907; 1912; 1913; 1923; 1925; 1931; 1944; 1960; 1962

Uniforms
Home

The Sydney Naval Football Club was an Australian rules football club that competed in the NSWANFL and based in Sydney. The team went by the nickname Redlegs. Between 1880 and 1944, and again from 1947 to 1954, the club was known simply as the Sydney Football Club.

== History ==
=== Sydney FC in the NSWFA ===
The Sydney Football Club was founded on 7 August 1880. Earlier, short lived, clubs by the same name had been formed in 1865 and 1868.

In 1886 the club went undefeated winning 12 games and drawing 2. In that season, they scored 52 goals, the record for goals scored up to that point.

Sydney won the Flanagan Cup, equivilent to a premiership in modern Australian rules, more times than any other club in the New South Wales Football Assosciation (NSWFA). The club's last win in the Assosication was in 1892. Sydney was set to play West Sydney in the final match. Earlier in the season, Sydney had lodged a successful protest against West Sydney for playing an ineligible player. As a result, West Sydney refused to take the field against Sydney. The NSWFA decided that the cup would then be awarded to Sydney as a result.

Sydney were one of the last clubs left in the NSWFA, still playing against the other four remianing teams in 1894.

=== Sydney FC in the NSWANFL ===
Sydney were one of the first New South Wales based clubs to use a Sherrin football, when they did so during a game against Balmain on 30 May 1903.

Sydney was successful at the start of the 20th century, winning New South Wales Australian Football League (NSWAFL) premierships in 1905, 1907, 1912, and 1913.

On 22 September 1923, Sydney faced Newtown in the NSWAFL grand final at Erskineville Oval in front of a crowd of 7,000. A strong breeze was present for most of the game, favouring Sydney in the first and third quarters. Sydney managed to hold a narrow lead for most of the game, though in the last quarter, with the breeze favouring Newtown, that began to change. The lead changed sides no fewer than four times during the fourth quarter. Newtown were leading by two points, with only two minutes left on the clock, when one of Newtown's defenders fumbled and Powers, described by the The Referee newspaper as the "Wizard of Sydney", was able to get the ball and scored the winning goal, his fourth of the game. The Referee credits Sydney's win to Powers, stating "Sydney's victory could be easily called Powers' victory, for besides landing four goals himself, he was in the main responsible for most of Sydney's efforts." The final score was 10.7 (67) - 8.15 (63)

Sydney also won the NSWAFL grand final in 1925 and survived the districting changes to clubs in 1926, when the NSWAFL became the New South Wales Australian National Football League (NSWANFL).

Sydney made the 1931 NSWANFL Grand Final, where they came up against Newtown. Despite conditions that The Referee newspaper described as "Wretched", Sydney were able to take an early two goal lead. The wet conditions favoured Sydney, with Newtown's taller players, used to a more aerial form of the game, unable to make many successful marks due to the slipperiness of the ball. Sydney's defenders and ruckmen played a crucial roll in stopping Newtown's efforts at goal, and the low scoring affair ended 6.7 (43) to 4.14 (38).

Sydney failed to win a game during its entire 1940 season, as most of its players had joined the Royal Australian Navy. Sydney even came close to disbanding due to the player shortage. Despite this Sydney player Cliff Barnsley won the Phelan Medal, with a staggering 37 votes, the equal highest number of votes in the medal's history.

=== Sydney Naval ===
On 22 May 1944, Sydney was renamed Sydney Naval. This was a gesture of support for the Navy, during the ongoing war. The name change also allowed the club to play games weekly, instead of once every three weeks. Sydney Naval's fortunes during the year fluctuated with whether their players were able to play, or were deployed by the Navy. With only three rounds left in the season, it was not certain if Sydney Naval could make finals.

Sydney Naval scrapped into the finals, and won their semi-final against St George by a single point. The game had had a fairly even first half, though the Redlegs took a 40-point lead at the end of the third quarter. In the last quarter of the game a strong wind picked up, and St George staged a staggering come-back, scoring 30 points in 15 minutes. With only five minutes remaining in the game Mallet, who had already scored twice for St George, marked the ball in front of goal. With the chance to level scores, Mallet's kick missed the goal and hit the post. St George continued to press their attack, but Sydney Naval held on long enough to come away with a 18.7 (115) - 16.18 (114) win.

Sydney Naval's next finals game, against Newtown, also had an incredibly close finish. With Sydney Naval only winning by 3 points. The game was marred by several fist-fights that broke out, both among fans and players, with umpire W. Quin having to step in multiple times. Sydney Naval player Ron Sheedy, only 17, scored the winning goal.

Sydney Naval won the 1944 NSWANFL Grand Final against the R.A.A.F. Despite the Air Force team's aerial advantage, having over eleven players over six-foot tall, they were unable to overcome Sydney Naval's pasing game. Umpire W. Quin again officiated the game, and again had to break up several fist-fights.

In 1945, Sydney Naval signed Roy Cazaly Jr., son of Roy Cazaly.

In 1947, the club reverted to their original name, before once more being renamed to Sydney Naval, in 1955. The club won the premiership again in 1960.

In the 1950s Sydney Naval developed a close connection with HMAS Albatross, with many Navy personnel from the station travelling from Nowra each week to play in the NSWANFL for the Redlegs.

During the 1962 season, Sydney Naval was only defeated twice, by Newtown and North Shore. In the 1962 Grand Final, the Redlegs came up against Newtown. Sydney Naval ended the first quarter with a convincing 27 point lead. Newtown was able to surge back in the second quarter, to bring Sydney Naval's lead down to only a single goal. The third and fourth quarters were a tight affair, though late in the fourth quarter Sydney Naval was able to extend their lead even further. The final score was 18.20 (128) - 14.13 (97). Sydney Naval player, Barry Skinner, was awarded best on ground.

In 1968, HMAS Albatross entered their own team in the St. George all-age competition. In 1969 Albatross, alongside HMAS Creswell joined the newly formed South Coast League. This significant departure of Navy personnel caused player numbers at Sydney Naval to flounder. As a result, in 1968, merger talks were held with South Sydney, though these talks did not go anywhere. There were calls for both South Sydney and Sydney Naval to be relegated after the 1969 season, but the NSWANFL decided the teams would remain in the League.

On 16 February 1970, the NSWANFL, in an effort to keep footballers at Sydney Naval, decreed that any Australian rules footballers from the Royal Australian Navy who wished to play in the NSWANFL had to either play for Sydney Naval, or get permission from Sydney Naval to play for other clubs. The rule was intended to apply until 1975. Merger talks were held again with South Sydney. South Sydney insisted on creating a totally new club, where-as Sydney Naval wanted to merge South Sydney into their existing club. As the two clubs were unable to agree on basics, the attempted merger collapsed in December 1970.

Sydney Naval did fare well in the 1971 NSWANFL season. On 27 June 1971, the Redlegs suffered a 211 point defeat to Western Suburbs, and on 31 July 1971, Sydney Naval forfeited their round 18 game to St George. On 2 August 1971, the NSWANFL suspended Sydney Naval. All matches from round 15 to 21 were awarded the Syndey Naval's opponents.

On 28 October 1971, following a special general meeting, the club was dissolved, ending a 91-year-old legacy.

== Club identity and culture ==
=== Gurnseys ===
Sydney Naval Redlegs wore uniforms similar to Norwood Redlegs, with their red socks giving the team their moniker.

=== Rivalries ===
From their days as teams in the NSWFA, Sydney Naval had a rivalry with East Sydney.

== Club honours ==
Premierships
Competition	Level	Wins	Years won
NSWFA	Flanagan Cup	7	1882, 1883, 1886, 1887, 1888, 1889, 1892
NSWANFL	First Grade	10	1905, 1907, 1912, 1913, 1923, 1925, 1931, 1944, 1960, 1962
Finishing positions
Competition	Position	Wins	Years won
NSWANFL	Minor premiership*	4*	1905, 1907, 1911, 1950,
NSWANFL	Grand Finalist	7	1911, 1914, 1933, 1948, 1950, 1957, 1961
NSWANFL	Wooden spoons*	9*	1935, 1936, 1940, 1943, 1945, 1946, 1968, 1970, 1971

^{*} This data is incomplete for the years 1913 to 1934

=== List of Grand Final Victories ===
A list of Grand Finals won by Sydney Naval in the highest division of the NSWAFL

Year	Opponent	Score	Venue
1905	YMCA	7.9 (51) - 7.8 (50)	SCG Oval No. 2, Moore Park
1907	Newtown	9.6 (60) - 1.4 (10)	Kensington Racecourse, Kensington
1912	Paddington	5.13 (43) - 2.3 (15)	Australian Football Ground, Rosebery
1913	Paddington	9.16 (70) - 6.6 (42)	
1923	Newtown	10.7 (67) - 8.15 (63)	Erskineville Oval, Erskineville
1925	Paddington	9.13 (67) - 7.10 (52)	
1931	Newtown	6.7 (43) - 4.14 (38)	
1944	R.A.A.F	11.15 (81) - 8.17 (63)	Erskineville Oval, Erskineville
1960	Newtown	9.12 (66) - 9.9 (63)	Trumper Park Oval, Paddington
1962	Newtown	18.20 (128) - 14.13 (97)	Trumper Park Oval, Paddington

== Individual honours ==
=== Phelan Medal winners ===
The Phelan Medal was awarded to the best player in the New South Wales Australian National Football League, now known as the AFL Sydney Men's Premier Division, during the home-and-away season as voted by the umpires:

- Bobby Power (1926)
- Billy McCoy (1928, 1929)
- Cliff Barnsley (1940, 1941)
- Ralph Turner (1961)
- Norm Tuxford (1966)
- Peter Body (1967)

=== Sanders Medal winners ===
The Sanders Medal was awarded to the best player in the New South Wales Australian National Football League Reserves Grade, now known as the AFL Sydney Men's Division One, during the home-and-away season as voted by the umpires:

- Cliff Barnsley (1937)
- Ron White (1946, 1949)

=== VFL Players ===
The following Sydney Naval players have played in the Victorian Football League:

- Tom Ironmonger (St Kilda)
- Jack Sheedy (South Melbourne)

== Seasons ==
Premiers	Grand Finalist	Minor premiers	Wooden spoon

=== New South Wales Australian Football Association ===
The New South Wales Australian Football Association had not fully embraced Melbourne rules football as of 1892, as such the following table is based off of avaliable data.

Sydney Football Club seasons
Year	P	W	D	L	GF	GA
1881	6	1	1	4	12	18
1882	12	9	2	1	43	20
1883	10	8	1	1	46	20
1884	9	5	0	4	22	16
1885	11	10	0	1	48	6
1886	14	12	0	2	52	11
1887						
1888						
1889						
1890						
1891						
1892*						
1893						
1894						

^{* Sydney won the 1892 Flanagan Cup after West Sydney forfeited the final game}

=== New South Wales Australian National Football League ===
Known as New South Wales Australian Football League until 1926

Sydney FC/Sydney Naval NSWANFL seasons
Year	No.	P	W	D	L	%
1903	3rd	9	6	0	3	180.1
1904	6th	9	4	0	5	66.4
1905	1st	11	9	0	2	182.3
1906	2nd	14	11	0	3	224.4
1907	1st	14	11	2	1	230.5
1908	6th	13	4	0	9	92.4
1909	8th	12	3	0	9	69.5
1910	3rd	14	8	1	5	148.1
1911	1st	14	12	0	2	194.1
1912	2nd	14	11	1	2	166.7
Data missing from 1913 to 1934
1935	6th	15	4	0	11	72.05
1936	6th	18	4	0	14	77.06
1937	4th	19	9	0	9	103.65
1938	5th	18	6	0	12	83.29
1939	5th	18	3	2	13	61.67
1940	6th	17	0	0	16	49.03
1941	5th	17	4	0	13	66.09
1942	4th	14	5	0	9	81.77
1943	6th	18	1	0	17	55.24
1944	4th	18	7	0	11	99.18
1945	6th	18	4	0	14	70.85
1946	6th	18	4	0	14	73.74
1947	6th	14	5	0	9	97
1948	4th	16	10	0	6	120.67
1949	6th	18	9	0	9	103.13
1950	1st	16	12	3	2	128.15
1951	4th	18	13	0	5	118.21
1952	3rd	18	11	1	5	112.69
1953	8th	18	4	0	14	60.65
1954	9th	18	2	0	16	64.1
1955	7th	18	8	0	10	125.89
1956	5th	18	11	0	7	116.17
1957	3rd	18	14	0	4	151.46
1958	6th	18	9	0	9	116.5
1959	4th	17	10	0	7	121.69
1960	2nd	18	13	0	5	117.25
1961	3rd	18	12	0	6	131.50
1962	2nd	18	16	0	2	169.8
1963	3rd	15	10	1	4	126.95
1964	3rd	18	13	0	5	143.6
1965	3rd	18	14	0	4	136.26
1966	8th	18	6	0	12	90.35
1967	5th	18	10	1	7	113.25
1968	10th	18	1	0	17	49.15
1969	10th	18	0	0	18	24.43
1970	8th	21	1	0	20	41.63
1971	8th	17*	0	0	21*	27.73

^{*Rounds 18 through to 21 of the 1971 season were not played, but were considered as loses for the table. Rounds 15 to 17, which were played, were retroactivly considered as forfeits.}
