= Clothesline (disambiguation) =

A clothes line is an apparatus on which laundry is hung to dry, usually outdoors.

Clothes line or clothesline may also refer to:

- Clothesline, a set of strikes in professional wrestling
- Clothes-Line, an early television documentary on fashion history (1937)

== See also ==
- The Clothesline Project
