= One percenter (Australian rules football) =

A one percenter (1%er) is a statistic kept in Australian rules football, and relates to a variety of actions which benefit the team, but are infrequent or defensive.

== History ==
In 1995, one percenters were recorded by statistician Paul Callery during the 1995 AFL Season on Magic 1278AM Radio in Melbourne.

== Definition ==
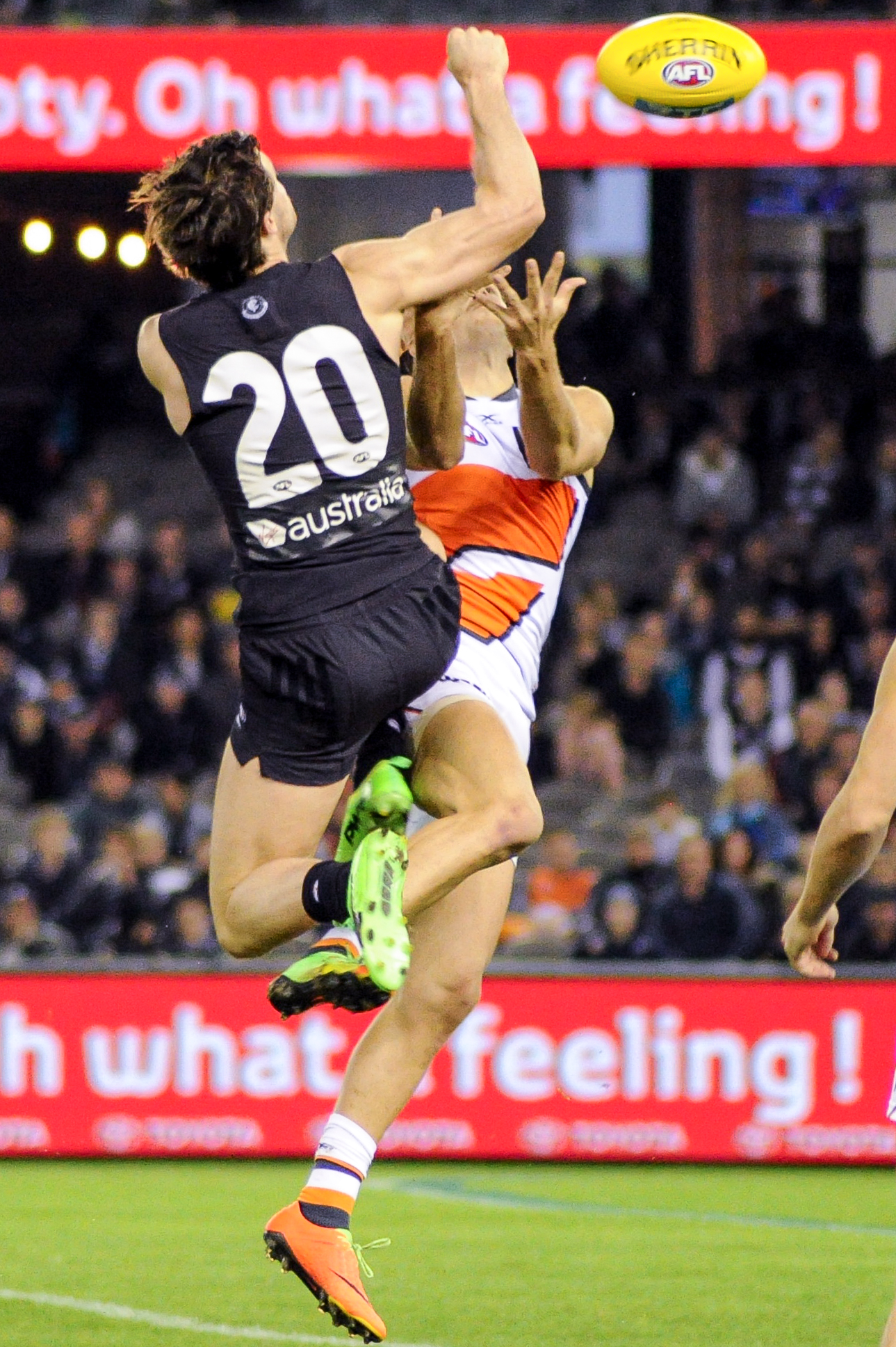
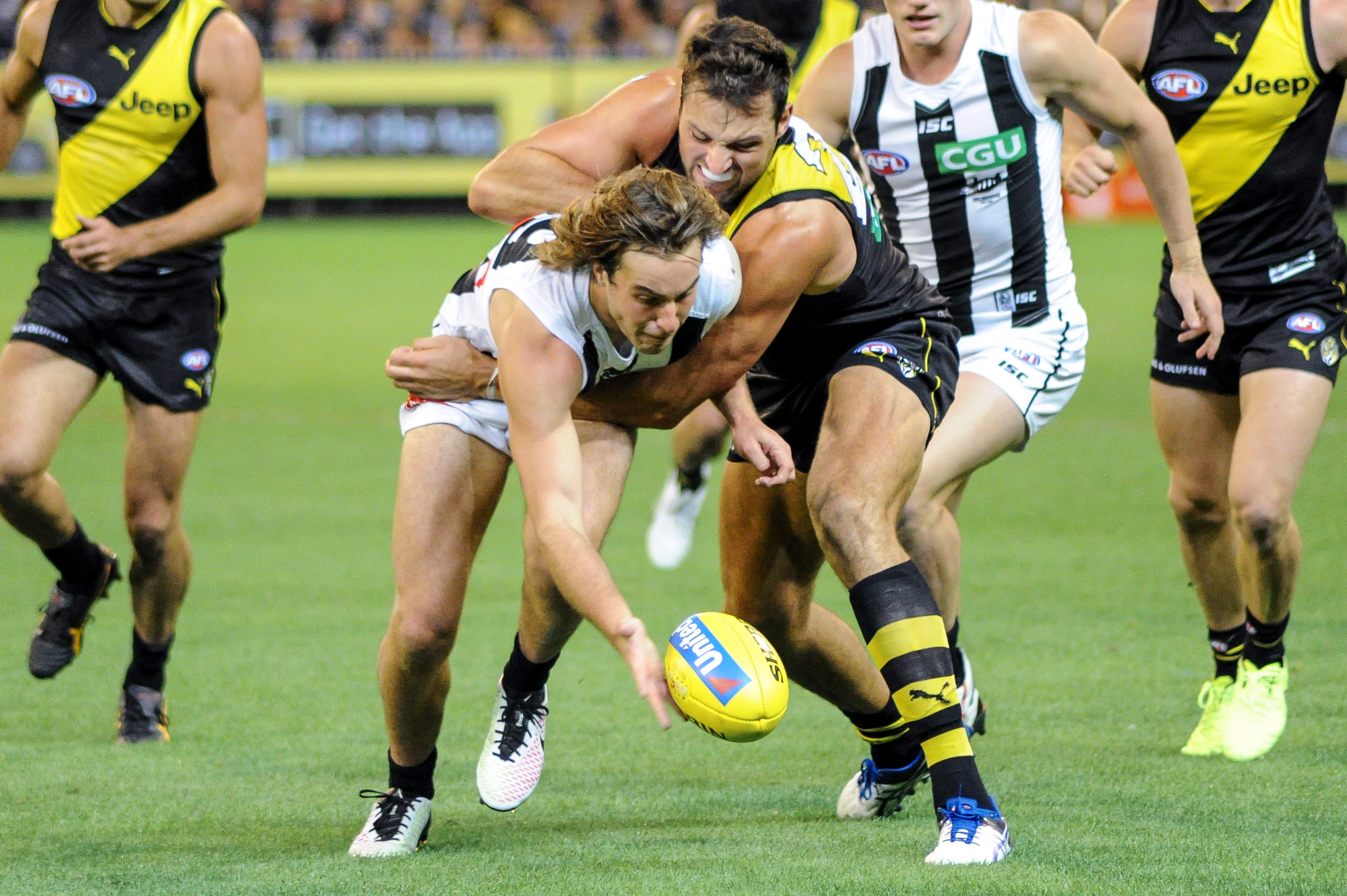
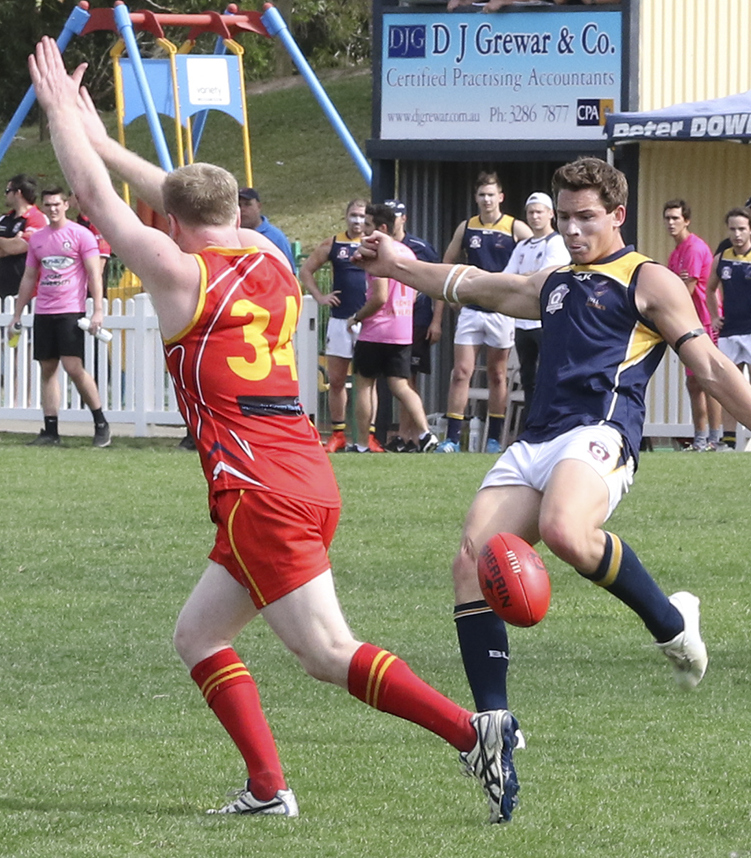
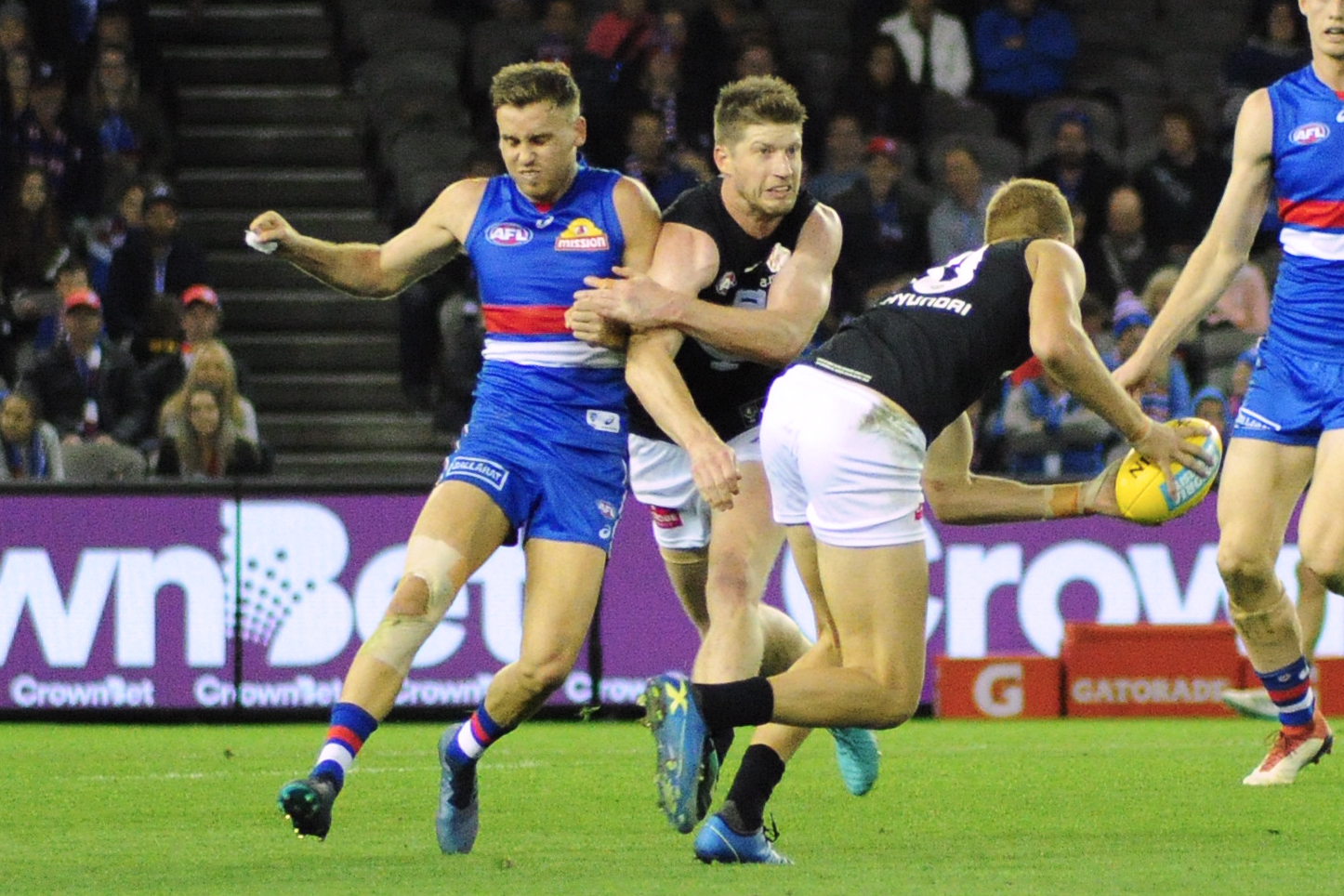
Some of the one percenters of Australian football. Clockwise from upper-left corner: Player 20 effectively spoils a mark by punching the ball with the fist; a player knocking the ball on to advantage using the open hand; players clears the path for a teammate in possession with a shepherd; Player 34 attempts to smother a kick

There are four actions which constitute a one percenter according to official AFL statistics: knock-ons, spoils, smothers, and shepherds.

=== Spoil ===
A spoil is preventing an opposition player from taking clean possession of a pass from a team-mate. This is most usually done by punching the ball away from the contest. In the 2011 semi-final against Sydney, Hawthorn defender Josh Gibson compiled an AFL record 21 spoils.

=== Knock-ons ===
A knock-on is using the hand, either clenched or open, to tap the ball to the advantage of a team-mate, without ever taking possession of the football (except out of the ruck). It has the same advantage as a quick handpass or kick, but is not recognised as a disposal because the player never has possession.

=== Smother ===
A smother is the act of using the arms or body to get in the way of an opponent's kick, as it leaves the player's boot. A player who smothers the ball is generally seen diving across in front of the kicking player, hoping to trap the ball as it is kicked. Smothers sometimes lead to turn-overs, but not always.

=== Shepherd ===
A shepherd is the legal act of preventing an opponent from obtaining the ball or tackling a team-mate.

== Other one percenters ==
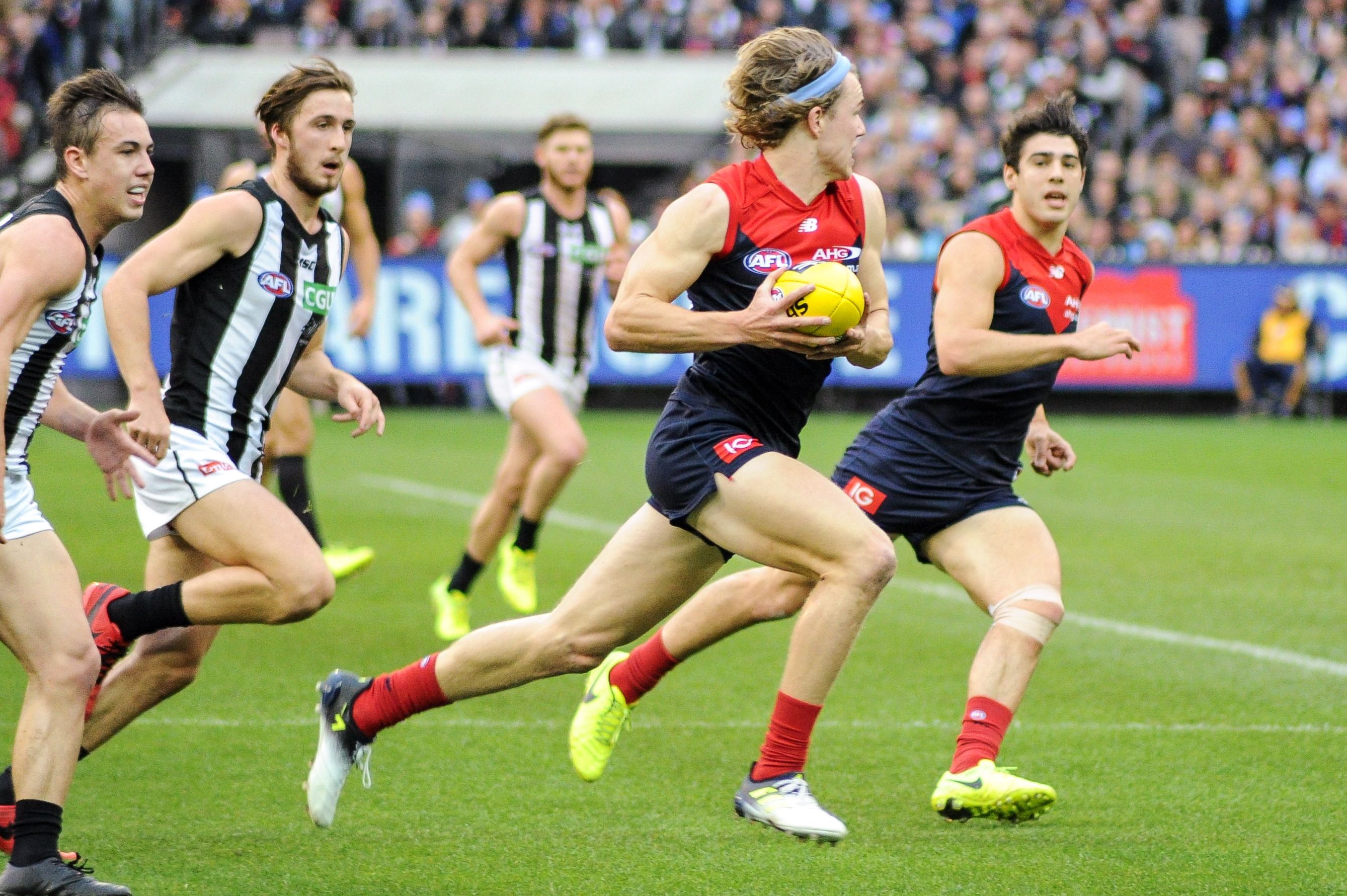
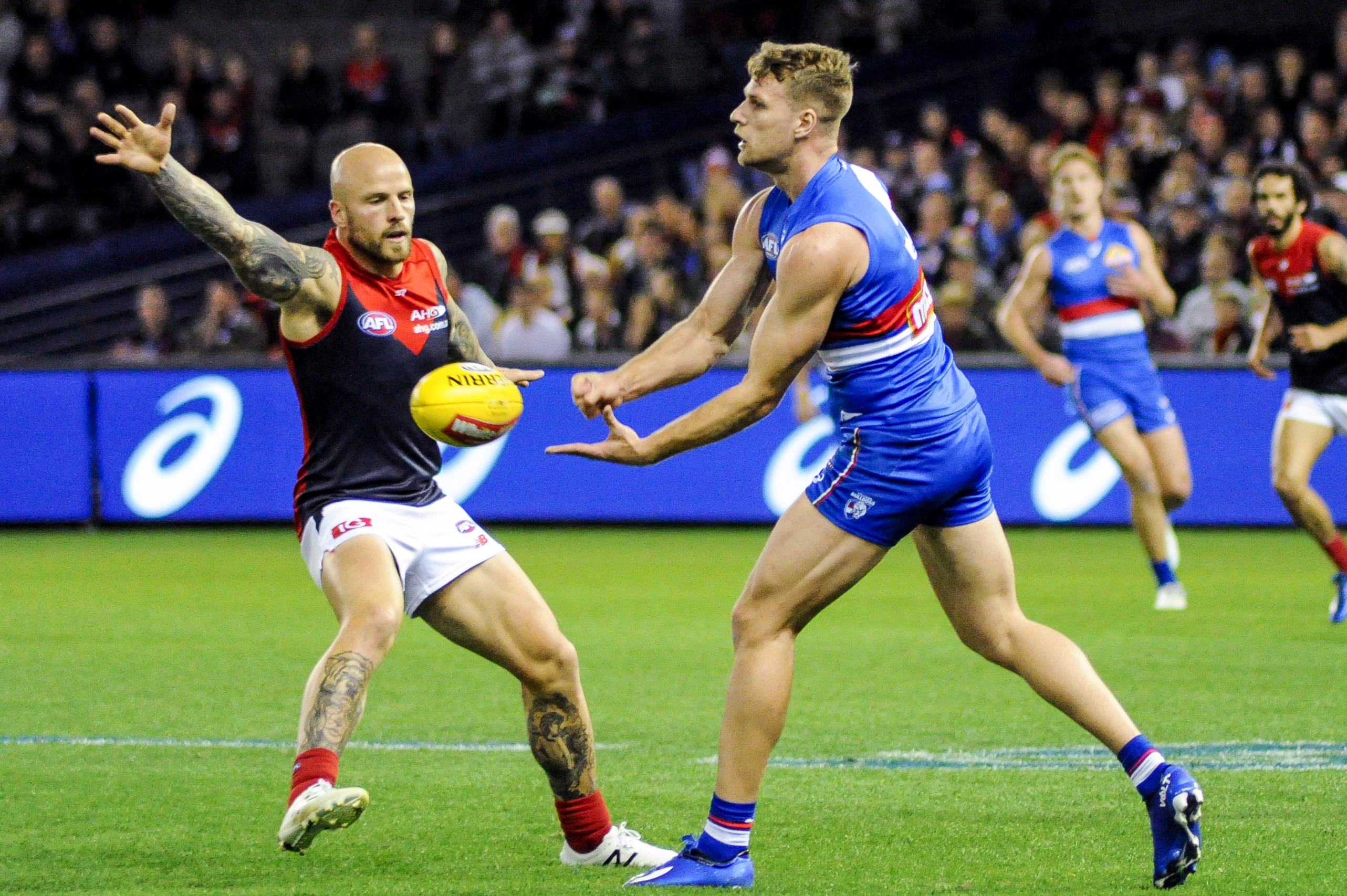
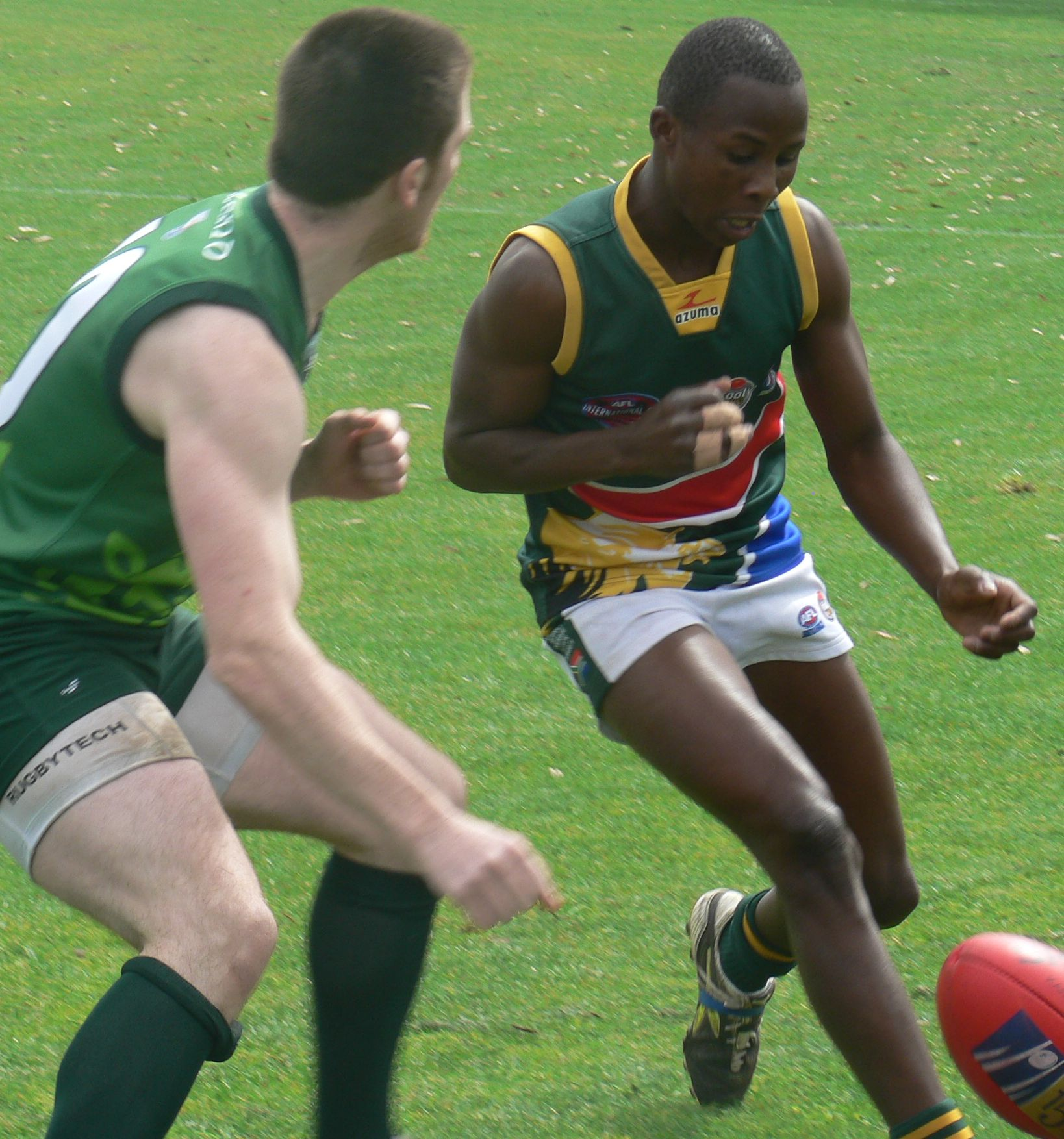
