= Central Goulburn Valley Football League =

Australian Rules Football League in Victoria

The Central Goulburn Valley Football League (CGVFL) was an Australian Rules Football League based in the Goulburn Valley region of Victoria. The CGVFL was originally established as the Ardmona Central Junior Football Association in 1923, before being re-named to the Goulburn Valley Second Eighteens Football Association in 1926, Goulburn Valley Football Association in 1937 and finally the Central Goulburn Valley Football League on Monday, 11 March 1946 at the league's Annual General Meeting.

== History ==
=== Goulburn Valley Second Eighteens Football Association (1926–1936) and renaming ===
The Goulburn Valley Second Eighteens Football Association (GVSEFA) superseded the Ardmona Central Junior Football Association, and was established in 1926 from the following Goulburn Valley clubs – Ardmona, Dookie, Mooroopna, Shepparton East and Undera, with Mr Brophy as president and Mr J Pearson as secretary as the initial office bearers.

This competition ran for eleven seasons, from 1926 to 1936 and was a completely separate competition to the Goulburn Valley Football Association.

Sir John Gladstone Black McDonald, who would later become the 37th premier of Victoria, was president of the GVSEFA from 1927 to 1933.

The GVSEFA was a Saturday afternoon competition, while the Goulburn Valley Football League was a Wednesday afternoon competition.

At the AGM of the GVSEFA in 1937 it was proposed to change the name of the association to just the Goulburn Valley Football Association and this was approved at the next delegates meeting in March, where it was also agreed to retain the junior status of the competition in favour of a senior football competition. 1937.

During this era, the "new" GVFA was played on Saturdays and the Goulburn Valley Football League was played on Wednesdays, with the new GVFA a more Shepparton based competition, with the grand final being played on the Shepparton Recreation Reserve (now Deakin Reserve) each year.

In 1940, Shepparton Imperials' committee decide to drop the "Imperials" from its name and would be known as just the Shepparton Football Club.

The GVFA went into recess between 1942 and 1944 due to World War II. During the late stages of World War II, the GVFA was revived in 1945, with the following teams competing – Ardmona, Dookie, Dookie College, Katandra, Mooroopna, Shepparton, Shepparton East, SPC and Tatura. Sheppparton East defeated SPC in the grand final and John McLeish from Dookie College won the 1945 – GVFA Best and Fairest / Shepparton Advertiser Trophy.

The GVFA changed its name to the Central Goulburn Valley Football League at the 1946 GVFA – AGM, when the Goulburn Valley Football League was re-established in 1946.

The Central Goulburn Valley Football League (CGVFL) was established on Monday, 11 March 1946 at the Annual General Meeting of the Goulburn Valley Football Association, when a name change of this Australian rules football competition took place.

In July, 1946, former Richmond player and Katandra captain, Eddie Ford collided with an Ardmona player, but played out the game and went home, but later became ill. Ford was taken to the Mooroopna Hospital, where he later died.

In 1947, CGVFL premiers, Ardmona were defeated by the premiers of the Murray Football League, Cobram, played at Numurkah in October, 1947.

On Thursday, 23 February 1950, the Centrals Seconds Association officially folded up and existing teams were recommended to join the CGVFL senior football competition.

At the 1950 CGVFL – AGM, Miepoll were admitted into the competition, Shepperton East and SPC merged, but joined the Goulburn Valley Football League as City United Football Club and Mr. J Pearson was elected as secretary for the 25th consecutive year of the following football competitions –

- Goulburn Valley Second Eighteens Football Association – 1926 to 1936
- Goulburn Valley Football Association – 1937 to 1945
- Central Goulburn Valley Football League – 1946 to 1952

In June, 1950, the Goulburn Valley Football League 13.14 – 92 defeated Central Goulburn Valley Football League 8.15 – 63.

The CGVFL officially went into "recess" at the 1953 CGVFL – AGM, but never reformed as a football competition.

A thorough history of this rural Australian rules football competition can be found in a 1949 article in the Shepparton Advertiser by clicking on this citation.

== Clubs ==
=== Final clubs ===
Club	Colours	Nickname	Home Ground	Former League	Est.	CGVFL Seasons	CGVFL Senior Premierships		Fate
Club	Colours	Nickname	Home Ground	Former League	Est.	CGVFL Seasons	Total	Years	Fate
Dookie College		Students	Dookie College	TTFA	1908	1927, 1930-1938, 1941-1952	1	1952	Barred from re-entry in 1928. Played in Tatong Thoona FA in 1939-40. Moved to Benalla Tungamah FL in 1953
Katandra		Kats	Katandra Recreation Reserve, Katandra West	KDFA	1911	1936-1941, 1945-1952	2	1950, 1951	Moved to Benalla Tungamah FL in 1953
Miepoll			Miepoll Recreation Reserve, Miepoll	EDFA	1900s	1950-1952	0	-	1953-1954 unknown. Began playing in Kyabram District FL in1955.
Shepparton East		Tigers	Central Park Recreation Reserve, Shepparton East	SSFA	1925	1925-1926, 1945-1952	3	1926, 1945, 1948	Entered recess after 1926 season. Re-formed in Shepparton Sunday FA in 1944. Merged with SPC to form City United in 1950, who fielded a team known as Shepparton East in CGVFL until the competition's demise. Re-formed in Kyabram District FL in 1956.
Tallygaroopna		Redlegs	Tallygaroopna Recreation Reserve, Tallygaroopna	GVFA	1904	1930-1940, 1946-1952	0	-	Moved to Picola & District FL in 1953
Undera		Lions	Undera Recreation Reserve, Undera	KDJFA, KDFA	1888	1923-1939, 1950-1952	2	1925, 1930	Merged with Mooroopna in 1953, re-formed in Kyabram District FL in 1954

=== Former clubs ===
Club	Colours	Nickname	Home Ground	Former League	Est.	CGVFL Seasons	CGVFL Senior Premierships		Fate
Club	Colours	Nickname	Home Ground	Former League	Est.	CGVFL Seasons	Total	Years	Fate
Ardmona			Ardmona Recreation Reserve, Ardmona	TDFA	1920	1923-1949	5	1932, 1933, 1935, 1936 1947	Entered recess in 1950, re-formed in Kyabram District FL in 1957
Benalla All Blacks			Friendlies Oval, Benalla	TTFA	1934	1946	0	-	Entered recess in early 1947, re-formed in Benalla & District FL in 1953
Bunbartha	Dark with light sash		Bunbartha Recreation Reserve, Bunbartha	GVFA	1910	1928-1930	0	-	Absorbed by Tallygaroopna in 1931
Cosgrove				KDFA		1927-1929	0	-	Merged with Dookie in 1930 to form Dookie Cosgrove
Dookie (Yabba-Dookie 1940-41)	Purple (1926-41)(1947-48)	Magpies	Dookie Recreation Reserve, Dookie	KDFA	1887	1926, 1940-1948	0	-	Moved to Drumanure-Katamatite-Dookie District JFA in 1927. Moved to Benalla Tungamah FL in 1949
Dookie Cosgrove				–	1930	1930	0	-	De-merged into Dookie and Cosgrove, who both moved to Katandra FA in 1931
Kyabram Youth Club				–	1940s	1949-1950	0	-	Moved to Kyabram District FL in 1951
Lemnos			Lemnos Recreation Reserve, Lemnos	–	1928	1928-1941	4	1934, 1937, 1938, 1940	Moved to Goulburn Valley FL in 1946 as Lemnos-Shepparton
Merrigum		Tigers	Merrigum Recreation Reserve, Merrigum	CFA	1902	1923-1924	0	-	Moved to Kyabram District Junior FA in 1925
Mooroopna		Cats	Mooroopna Recreation Reserve, Mooroopna	GVFL	1877	1939-1948	2	1939, 1946	Returned to Goulburn Valley FL in 1949
Mooroopna Seconds		Cats	Mooroopna Recreation Reserve, Mooroopna	SDSEFA	1877	1923-1948	2	1928, 1929	Moved to Goulburn Valley FL in 1949
North West Mooroopna						1923-1924	0	-	Folded
Numurkah Seconds		Blues	Numurkah Recreation Reserve, Numurkah	PDFL	1882	1948-1949	0	-	Moved to Picola & District FL in 1950
Shepparton		Maroons	Deakin Reserve, Shepparton	GVFL	1880s	1940-1949	2	1941, 1949	Returned to Goulburn Valley FL in 1950
Shepparton Boys				–	1950	1950	0	-	Folded in 1951
SPC (Shepparton Imperials 1926-39)		Fuchsias, Imps	Deakin Reserve, Shepparton	Unknown league "in the vicinity of Kialla"; SSFA	1924	1926-1929, 1931-1939, 1945-1949	2	1927, 1934	Played in Goulburn Valley FA in 1930. Entered recess due to WWII, re-formed in 1944 as SPC in Shepparton Sunday FA. Merged with Shepparton East to form City United in 1950
Shepparton Settlement						1926	0	-	Entered recess in 1927
Tatura Reserves		Bulldogs	Tatura Showgrounds, Tatura	GVFL	1904	1945	0	-	Re-joined Goulburn Valley FL in 1946
Tatura Reserves		Bulldogs	Tatura Showgrounds, Tatura		1904	1923-?, 1933-1935	2	1923, 1924	1936-46 unknown. Played in Kyabram District FL in 1947.
Toolamba		Grasshoppers	Toolamba Recreation Reserve, Toolamba	GVFL	1930s	1923-?, 1931-1940, 1946, 1949-1951	0	-	Absorbed by Murchison in 1952
Wunghnu		Magpies	Wunghnu Recreation Reserve, Wunghnu	GVFA	1874	1931-1939, 1949-1950	1	1931	Moved to Picola & District FL in 1951

== CGVFL Honour Board ==
Year	Premiers	Score	Runners up	Score	Grade / Venue	President	Secretary	Treasurer
Central Ardmona Junior FA
1923	Tatura							
1924	Tatura							
1925	Undera	5.9 (39)	Shepparton East	4.3 (27)	At Mooroopna			
Goulburn Valley Second Eighteens FA
1926	Shepparton East	14.11 (95)	Dookie	4.9 (33)	At Shepparton			
1927	Shepparton Imperials		Mooroopna					
1928	Mooroopna		Shepparton Imperials					
1929	Mooroopna		Ardmona					
1930	Undera	10.9 (69)	Ardmona	8.6 (54)	At Shepparton			
1931	Wunghnu	16.11 (107)	Toolamba	12.21 (93)	At Shepparton			
1932	Ardmona	14.17 (101)	Toolamba	13.12 (90)	At Shepparton			
1933	Ardmona		Toolamba (forfeit)		Not held. Toolamba forfeited due to the choice of umpire.			
1934	Shepparton Imperials		Ardmona					
1935	Ardmona	10.6 (66)	Shepparton Imperials	8.10 (48)	At Shepparton			
1936	Ardmona	10.11 (71)	Lemnos	9 12 (66)	At Shepparton			
Goulburn Valley Football Association
1937	Lemnos	12.12 – 84	Undera	7.14 – 56	At Shepparton			
1938	Lemnos	12.11 – 83	Mooroopna	12.11 – 83	At Shepparton. Drawn Grand Final			
1938	Lemnos	18.18 – 126	Mooroopna	7.14 – 56	At Shepparton. Grand Final Replay			
1939	Mooroopna	10.15 – 75	Lemnos	10.14 – 74	At Shepparton			
1940	Lemnos	7.18 – 60	Shepparton	7.14 – 56	Neo Cafe Cup			
1941	Shepparton	11.9 – 85	Ardmona	9.7 – 61	At Shepparton			
1942/44	In recess - WW2							
1945	Shepparton East	10.9 69	S.P.C.	9.5 – 59	At Shepparton. GVFA revived			
Central Goulburn Valley Football League
1946	Mooroopna	12.16 – 88	Shepparton	9.15 – 69	Senior Premiers, At Shepparton RR	N W Fairless	J Pearson	J Pearson
1946	All Blacks	18.9 – 117	Toolamba	14.9 – 93	Seconds Premiers, At Shepparton RR	N W Fairless	J Pearson	J Pearson
1947	Ardmona	7.11 – 53	Shepparton	5.10 – 40	Senior Premiers, At Shepparton RR	M G O'Brien	J Pearson	J Pearson
1947	Shepparton Boys	8.13 – 61	Shepparton	7.3 – 45	Seconds Premiers, At Shepparton RR	M G O'Brien	J Pearson	J Pearson
1948	Shepparton East	10.12 – 72	Shepparton	10.7 – 67	Senior Premiers, At Deakin Reserve	M G O'Brien	J Pearson	J Pearson
1948	SPC	11.14 – 80	Numurkah	5.13 – 43	Seconds Premiers, At Deakin Reserve	M G O'Brien	J Pearson	J Pearson
1949	Shepparton	8.8 – 56	S.P.C.	4.18 – 42	Senior Premiers, At Deakin Reserve.	M G O'Brien	J Pearson	J Pearson
1949	SPC	3.10 – 28	Tallygaroopna	3.10 – 28	Tied Seconds Grand Final, At Deakin Reserve.	M G O'Brien	J Pearson	J Pearson
1949	Tallygaroopna	9.14 – 68	SPC	6.12 – 48	Seconds Grand Final Replay, At Numurkah.	M G O'Brien	J Pearson	J Pearson
1950	Katandra	15.15 – 105	Dookie College	12.9 – 81	At Deakin Reserve	Cr. C H Whitfield	J Pearson	J Pearson
1951	Katandra	13.19 – 97	Dookie College	10.3 – 63	At Deakin Reserve	Cr. C H Whitfield	J Pearson	J Pearson
1952	Dookie College	16.6 – 102	Katandra	6.5 – 35	At Deakin Reserve	Cr. C H Whitfield	J Pearson	J Pearson

- Shepparton RR – Shepparton Recreation Reserve (venue name was changed to Deakin Reserve in October, 1947, after Alfred Deakin)

== CGVFL – Best and Fairest Award ==
This award was donated by and called the Shepparton Advertiser Trophy, in 1946 and 1947, then was called the Neal Hanlon Memorial Trophy from 1948 to 1952.

Year	Winners	Club	Votes	Runner up	Club	Votes	Comments
1946	W "Bill" Hanlon &	Shepparton East	18	Eddie Ford &	Katandra	16	
	Eric "Bubby" James	Shepparton	18	J Williams	Dookie College	16	
1947	Eric Roscoe	Shepparton	48	Alex Slocombe	Dookie College	36	
1948	Alex Slocombe	Dookie College	31	M Dexter &	Dookie College	28	
				Pat Dalton	Shepparton East	28	
1949	Murray Slee	Shepparton	34	Pat Dalton	Shepparton East	28	
1950	John Landy	Dookie College	32	Jimmy Wong	Shepparton Boys	23	
1951	Harry Cook	Shepparton East	26	Max Mills	Katandra	21	
1952	Jim Hovey	Tallygaroopna	27	Max Mills	Katandra	26	

1946: Eric James also won the Goulburn Valley Football League's Morrison Medal in 1935 & 1937, with the Shepparton Football Club.

== CGVFL – Leading Goalkicker ==
Year	Winner	Club	Goals	Goals in finals
1946	Norman Marchment	S.P.C.	59	
1947	Norman Marchment	S.P.C.	97	
1948	Norm Thorne	Mooroopna	88	
1949	K Roulent	S.P.C.	41	
1950	R "Dick" Broughton	Tallygaroopna	61	5 = 66
1951	R Bearham	Dookie College	28	0, 2 & 3 = 33
1952	?			
