= Murchison-Toolamba Football Netball Club =

Australian football and netball club

Murchison-Toolamba FNC
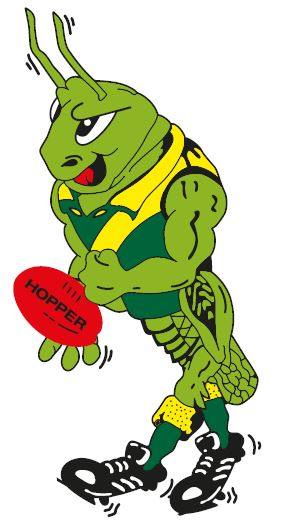

Names
- Full name: Murchison-Toolamba Football Netball Club
- Nickname: Grasshoppers

Club details
- Founded: 1881; 144 years ago
- Colours
- Competition: Kyabram DFNL
- Premierships: 11 (1897, 1904, 1910, 1914, 1945, 1964, 1966, 1982, 2013, 2024, 2025)
- Ground: Murchison Recreation Reserve

Uniforms
Home

Murchison-Toolamba Football Netball Club, nicknamed the Grasshoppers, is an Australian Rules Football and Netball club that plays its home games in the small north eastern Victoria town of Murchison. Its name also recognises the initial 1952 merger with nearby town of Toolamba.

It now competes in the Kyabram District Football League, where they field four grades of football (Seniors, Reserves, Under 18's & Under 15's) and Goulburn Murray Junior League, where they field two grades of football (Under 12s & Under 9s), and 8 grades of Netball (KDNL; A-Grade, B-Grade, C-Grade, C Reserve, Under 17's, Under 15's, Under 13's and Under 11's).

== History ==
The Murchison Football Club was established in 1881 and first competed in the Goulburn Valley Football League, the club transferred to the Upper Goulburn Football Association in 1897.

Throughout the early 20th century, Murchison competed in a range of regional competitions including the Waranga North East Football Association and later returned to the Goulburn Valley Football League following World War II. During its time in the GVFL, the club regularly played against strong regional sides such as Shepparton, Tatura, Rushworth, and Kyabram. Murchison moved to the Kyabram District Football League in 1964, where it continues to compete.

The nearby township of Toolamba also had its own football club during the first half of the 20th century, competing in various district leagues. The two clubs eventually merged in 1952 to form the Murchison-Toolamba Football Club, participating in the GVL. Upon joining the KDFL in 1964, the Toolamba name was dropped, and for the next five decades it was known simply as Murchison. Following a member vote on 14 April 2016, the Murchison-Toolamba name was officially reinstated.

The club’s colours have been bottle green with a gold sash since 1910, with minor design variations introduced over time. Earlier colours included:

- Navy jumper with navy knickerbockers, red hose and cap (1881–1894)
- Green and gold stripes with a red sash (1895–1907)
- Black and white stripes with a green sash (1908–1909)

White trim was added to the jumper in 2012 to reduce colour clashes with neighbouring clubs Rushworth and Lancaster. The club also wears a gold clash jumper with vertical green stripes.

Murchison-Toolamba has recently been one of the leading clubs in the Kyabram District Football Netball League, winning the past two Senior Premierships in 2024 and 2025.

== Football 1st XVIII Premierships ==
1st XVIII

- Upper Goulburn Football Association
  - 1897 - Murchison: 5.8 - 38 d Nagambie: 5.7 - 37
- Waranga Football Association
  - 1904 - Murchison: 1.3 - 9 d Rushworth: 1.1 - 7
- Goulburn Valley Football League
  - 1910 - Murchison: 13.9 - 87 d Echuca: 3.7 - 25
- Waranga North East Football Association
  - 1914 - Murchison: 7.5 - 47 defeated Nagambie: 4.8 - 32
- Euroa District Football Association
  - 1945 - Murchison: 26.17 - 173 d Euroa: 9.9 - 63
- Kyabram & District Football League
  - 1964 - Murchison: 14.14 - 98 d Merrigum: 3.7 - 25
  - 1966 - Murchison: 10.15 - 75 d Nagambie: 8.15 - 63
  - 1982 - Murchison: 14.9 - 93 d Avenel 10.14 - 74
  - 2013 - Murchison: 16.19 - 115 d Stanhope: 12.12 - 84
  - 2024 - Murchison-Toolamba 13.13 - 91 d Shepparton East 6.8 - 44
  - 2025 - Murchison-Toolamba 13.9 - 87 d Lancaster 12.13 - 85

== Premierships 2nd XVIII ==
- Kyabram & District Football League
  - 1967, 1972, 1982, 2001, 2024
  - 2024 - Murchison-Toolamba 9.9 - 63 def Stanhope 3.3 - 21

== Premierships 3rd XVIII ==
- 1970, 1980, 2010

== Premierships 4th XVIII ==
- Nil

== Netball Premierships ==
- A Grade
  - Nil
- B Grade
  - Nil
- C Grade
  - 2012, 2013, 2014
- C Reserve
  - Nil
- 17 & Under
  - Nil
- 15 & Under
  - 2024
- 13 & Under
  - Nil
- 11 & Under
  - Nil

== KDL 1st XVIII Football Best & Fairest - McNamara Medal Winners ==
- 1964 G.Cross
- 1976 K.Atkinson
- 1987 Mark Rijs
- 2024 James Milne

== KDL 2nd XVIII Football Best & Fairest - Wade Medal Winners ==
- 2013 David Murray

== KDL 3rd XVIII Football Best & Fairest - Inch Medal Winners ==
- 2010 James Milne
- 2019 Aaron Miller
- 2025 Max Elder

== KDL 4th XVIII Football Best & Fairest - Medal Winners ==
- Nil

== KDL A Grade Netball Best & Fairest Winners ==
- 2012 Jess Thompson

== KDL B Grade Netball Best & Fairest Winners ==
- TBC

== KDL C Grade Netball Best & Fairest Winners ==
- TBC

== KDL C Reserve Netball Best & Fairest Winners ==
- TBC

== KDL 17 & Under Netball Best & Fairest Winners ==
- TBC

== KDL 15 & Under Netball Best & Fairest Winners ==
- TBC

== KDL 13 & Under Netball Best & Fairest Winners ==
- TBC
