= Pat Dalton (footballer, born 1918) =

Australian rules footballer

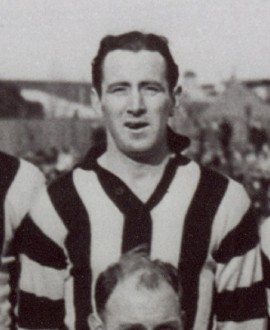
- Dalton in 1944

Personal information
- Full name: Pat Dalton
- Born: 6 September 1918
- Died: 15 September 2011 (aged 93)
- Original team: Ivanhoe Amateurs
- Height: 188 cm (6 ft 2 in)
- Weight: 83.5 kg (184 lb)

Playing career^{1}
Years	Club	Games (Goals)
1941–45	Collingwood	32 (7)
1945	North Melbourne	1 (0)
Total		33 (7)
- ^{1} Playing statistics correct to the end of 1945.

Pat Dalton (6 September 1918 – 15 September 2011) was an Australian rules footballer who played with Collingwood and North Melbourne in the Victorian Football League (VFL).

Dalton was transferred to Shepparton as a Policeman with the Victorian Police in 1947 and was cleared from Heidelberg to East Shepparton.

Dalton later coached Shepparton East in the Central Goulburn Valley Football League in 1948 (to a premiership) and 1949 (last).

Dalton was runner up in the Central Goulburn Valley Football League best and fairest award in both 1948 and 1949.

Dalton coached the newly formed City United in the Goulburn Valley Football League in 1950 (runners up) and 1951 (3rd).
