= Joe Sellwood =

Australian rules footballer, born 1911

Personal information
- Full name: Joseph Reuben Sellwood
- Born: 24 January 1911; Mataura, New Zealand
- Died: 18 October 2007 (aged 96); Belmont, Victoria
- Original team: Wunghnu Football Club (GVFA)
- Height: 184 cm (6 ft 0 in)
- Weight: 86 kg (190 lb)

Playing career^{1}
Years	Club	Games (Goals)
1930–1941; 1944–1945	Geelong	180 (97)
- ^{1} Playing statistics correct to the end of 1945.

Joseph Reuben Sellwood (24 January 1911 – 18 October 2007) was a New Zealand born Australian rules football player, playing 181 games (180 club, 1 representative) from 1930–1945.

== Family ==
The son of Reuben and Jane Sellwood, Joseph Reuben Sellwood was born at Mataura, New Zealand on 24 January 1911.

== Football ==
Sellwood, recruited from Goulburn Valley Football Association club Wunghu, made his senior debut for Geelong in the 1930 VFL season and was a member of their 1937 premiership team.

He represented Victoria against South Australia in 1937.

Following his VFL career he coached West Geelong in the Geelong Football League.

Prior to his death in 2007, Sellwood was recognised as the oldest VFL/AFL premiership player and was given honorary induction into the AFL 200 Club, because his career allegedly suffered significant interruption during World War II, preventing him from reaching 200 games.

== Death ==
Sellwood died on 18 October 2007 at a nursing home in Belmont, Victoria. He was survived by his four daughters Lesley, Margaret, Joan and Judith, 18 grandchildren, 37 great-grandchildren, and four great-great grandchildren. Sellwood's interests included playing the piano accordion, keyboard, watching football (particularly the Cats) and being with his family. He was the last surviving member of the 1937 Geelong premiership team.
