= Eric Roscoe =

Australian rules footballer

Personal information
- Full name: Eric Roscoe
- Born: 27 December 1922; Clifton Hill, Victoria
- Died: 11 May 2000 (aged 77)
- Original team: Shepparton
- Height: 170 cm (5 ft 7 in)
- Weight: 78 kg (172 lb)

Playing career^{1}
Years	Club	Games (Goals)
1948–49	Melbourne	17 (11)
- ^{1} Playing statistics correct to the end of 1949.

Eric Roscoe (27 December 1922 – 11 May 2000) was an Australian rules footballer who played with Melbourne in the Victorian Football League (VFL).

== Family ==
The son of Ellen Emma Roscoe (1899-1948), later Mrs. Joseph Winton, Eric Roscoe was born at Clifton Hill, Victoria on 27 December 1922. He married Edith Lila Wood in 1950.

== War Service ==
Roscoe enlisted in the Australian Army in November 1941 at the age of 18 and served in both New Guinea and the Solomon Islands until his discharge in 1946.

== Football ==
Roscoe won the 1947 Central Goulburn Valley Football League best and fairest award, when playing for Shepparton Football Club. Roscoe then moved to Melbourne where he played a total of 17 games over two seasons in the Victorian Football League.
