= Kyabram District Football Netball League =

Australian rules football league

- Formerly: Kyabram District Football League
- Sport: Australian rules football
- Founded: 1932
- No. of teams: 13
- Competitors: Avenel; Girgarre; Lancaster; Longwood; Merrigum; Murchison-Toolamba; Nagambie; Rushworth; Stanhope; Shepparton East; Tallygaroopna; Undera; Violet Town
- Country: Australia
- Most recent champion: Nagambie (14th title) (2026)

The Kyabram District Football Netball League (KDL) is a minor Australian rules football league in Victoria made up of 13 teams. The KDL is made up of smaller country town football clubs in the Goulburn Valley.

The majority of these towns have a population base of around 1000 people, each of these clubs aims to field four football sides in the Senior, Reserve, Under 18 and Under 15 divisions of the KDFL as well as eight netball sides in A-Grade, B-Grade, C-Grade, C Reserve, 17 & Under, 15 & Under, 13 & Under and 11 & Under divisions,

The KDL season is made up of 18 rounds in the home and away season, with each side playing 16 games, at the conclusion of the home and away season, the top six teams in each division face off in the finals series. The top two teams in this series are assured a second chance at making the Grand Final, however the third, fourth, fifth and sixth placed teams have no such luxury and are eliminated after any loss, this system works to reward the teams who have performed better over the home and away season.

During the season, each club will play eight home games and eight away games, in finals however, venues are designated to different clubs on a cycle. For over a decade the Grand Final has been hosted by Goulburn Valley Football League ground, Mooroopna hosting on most occasions and Tatura being the venue in 2013.

== History ==
The original Kyabram District Football Association was formed in 1915 at a meeting at Mate's Hotel, Kyabram from the following clubs - Kyabram Ramblers, Kyabram Rovers, Merrigum, Tongala, Undera and Wyuna, but when several club's pulled out mid season to take up lessons in rifle shooting, by the Kyabram Rifle Club, the season was abandoned, due to the local World War One movement.

The Kyabram District Football Association was formed in 1932, changing its name to Kyabram District Football League in 1960.

The Kyabram District Patriotic Football League was established in 1944 and continued on in 1945 to provide some local football in the Goulburn Valley area and also raised £400 in funds for the War.

In 2021, 18 home and away matches were played in the KDFNL, but no finals series was played due to the COVID-19 situation enforced by the Victorian Labor Government.

== Clubs ==
=== Locations ===
Locations of the Kyabram District FNL clubs

=== Current ===
Club	Colours	Nickname	Home Ground	Former League	Est.	Years in KDFNL	KDFNL Senior Premierships	
Club	Colours	Nickname	Home Ground	Former League	Est.	Years in KDFNL	Total	Years
Avenel		Swans	Avenel Recreation Reserve, Avenel	WNEFA	1881	1976–	6	1978, 1979, 1985, 1986, 1989, 1994
Girgarre		Kangaroos	Girgarre Recreation Reserve, Girgarre	KDJFA	1920	1932–38, 1940, 1944-47, 1949-	4	1952, 1976, 1983, 1991
Lancaster		Wombats	Lancaster Recreation Reserve, Lancaster	KDJFA	1910	1932–	11	1932, 1934, 1935, 1980, 1981, 1988, 1992, 2001, 2011, 2022, 2023
Longwood		Redlegs	Longwood Recreation Reserve, Longwood	BDFNL	1888	2010–	0	-
Merrigum		Bulldogs	Merrigum Recreation Reserve, Merrigum	KDJFA	1902	1933-1939, 1946–	9	1949, 1950, 1951, 1953, 1957, 1986, 1987, 1990, 2015
Murchison-Toolamba (Murchison 1964-2016)		Grasshoppers	Murchison Recreation Reserve, Murchison	GVFL	1881	1964–	6	1964, 1966, 1982, 2013, 2024, 2025
Nagambie		Lakers	Nagambie Recreation Reserve, Nagambie	GVFL	1881	1965–	14	1965, 1967, 1969, 1970, 1975, 1977, 1998, 1999, 2010, 2014, 2016, 2017, 2019, 2026
Rushworth		Tigers	Rushworth Recreation Reserve, Rushworth	HDFNL	1882	1998–	1	2004
Shepparton East		Eagles	Central Park Recreation Reserve, Shepparton East	PDFNL	1924	1956–1961, 2019–	4	1958, 1959, 1960, 1961
Stanhope		Lions	Stanhope Recreation Reserve, Stanhope	HDFNL	1920	1933-1945, 1995–	7	1936, 1938, 1944, 2000, 2003, 2007, 2008
Tallygaroopna		Redlegs	Tallygaroopna Recreation Reserve, Tallygaroopna	PDFNL	1904	1958–	6	1963, 1971, 1973, 1974, 2005, 2018
Undera		Lions	Undera Recreation Reserve, Undera	CGVFL	1888	1940–47, 1953–	7	1947, 1955, 1962, 1968, 1972, 1997, 2009
Violet Town		Towners	Violet Town Recreation Reserve, Violet Town	CGFL	1880	2006–	1	2012

== Former clubs ==
Club	Colours	Nickname	Home Ground	Former League	Est.	Years in KDFNL	KDFNL Senior Premierships		Fate
Club	Colours	Nickname	Home Ground	Former League	Est.	Years in KDFNL	Total	Years	Fate
Ardmona		Bush Cats	Ardmona Recreation Reserve, Ardmona	CGVFL	1920	1957-2021	5	1993, 1995, 1996, 2002, 2006	Folded after 2021 season
Cooma			Cooma Recreation Reserve, Cooma	KDJFA	c.1900s	1948-1954	0	-	Folded
Congupna		The Road	Congupna Recreation Reserve, Congupna	–	1956	1956-1961	1	1956	Moved to Benalla Tungamah FL in 1962
Corop			Corop Recreation Reserve, Corop	CVFA	c.1920s	1936	0	-	Folded prior to 1937 season.
Dookie United		Dooks	Dookie Recreation Reserve, Dookie	PDFNL	1977	2018–2024	0	-	Returned to Picola & District FNL in 2025
Kyabram Imperials			Kyabram Recreation Reserve, Kyabram	KDJFA	c.1900s	1948-1950	1	1948	Folded in April, 1951.
Kyabram Saturdays			Kyabram Recreation Reserve, Kyabram	NGVFL	c.1920s	1932-1940	1	1933	Folded
Kyabram Legion Rovers			Kyabram Recreation Reserve, Kyabram	–	c.1900s	1948-1949	0	-	Folded
Kyabram Reserves		Bombers	Kyabram Recreation Reserve, Kyabram	–	1886	1946-1947	0	–	Joined senior team in Goulburn Valley FL
Kyabram Youth Club			Kyabram Recreation Reserve, Kyabram	CGVFL	1940s	1951-1958	1	1954	Folded in early 1956
Miepoll			Miepoll, Recreation Reserve, Miepoll	CGVFL	c.1900s	1955-1962	0	-	Folded after 1962 season.
POW Camp No. 1		Camps		–	1942	1946	1	1946	Folded
Tatura Juniors		Bulldogs	Tatura Showgrounds, Tatura	CGVFL	1894	1947	0		Joined senior team in Goulburn Valley FL
Tongala		Blues	Tongala Recreation Reserve, Tongala	EFL	1894	1936-1947	4	1937, 1939, 1940, 1945	Moved to Goulburn Valley FNL following 1945 season, reserves remained until 1947
Wyuna			Wyuna Recreation Reserve, Wyuna	PDFNL	c.1900s	1932-1936, 1946-1952	0	-	Recess between 1937-45. Folded in April, 1953.
Yea		Tigers	Yea Showgrounds, Yea	YVMDFL, CGFL	1887	1986-1997, 2006-2007	0	-	Played in Central Goulburn FL between 1998-2005. Moved to Yarra Valley Mountain District FL in 2008.

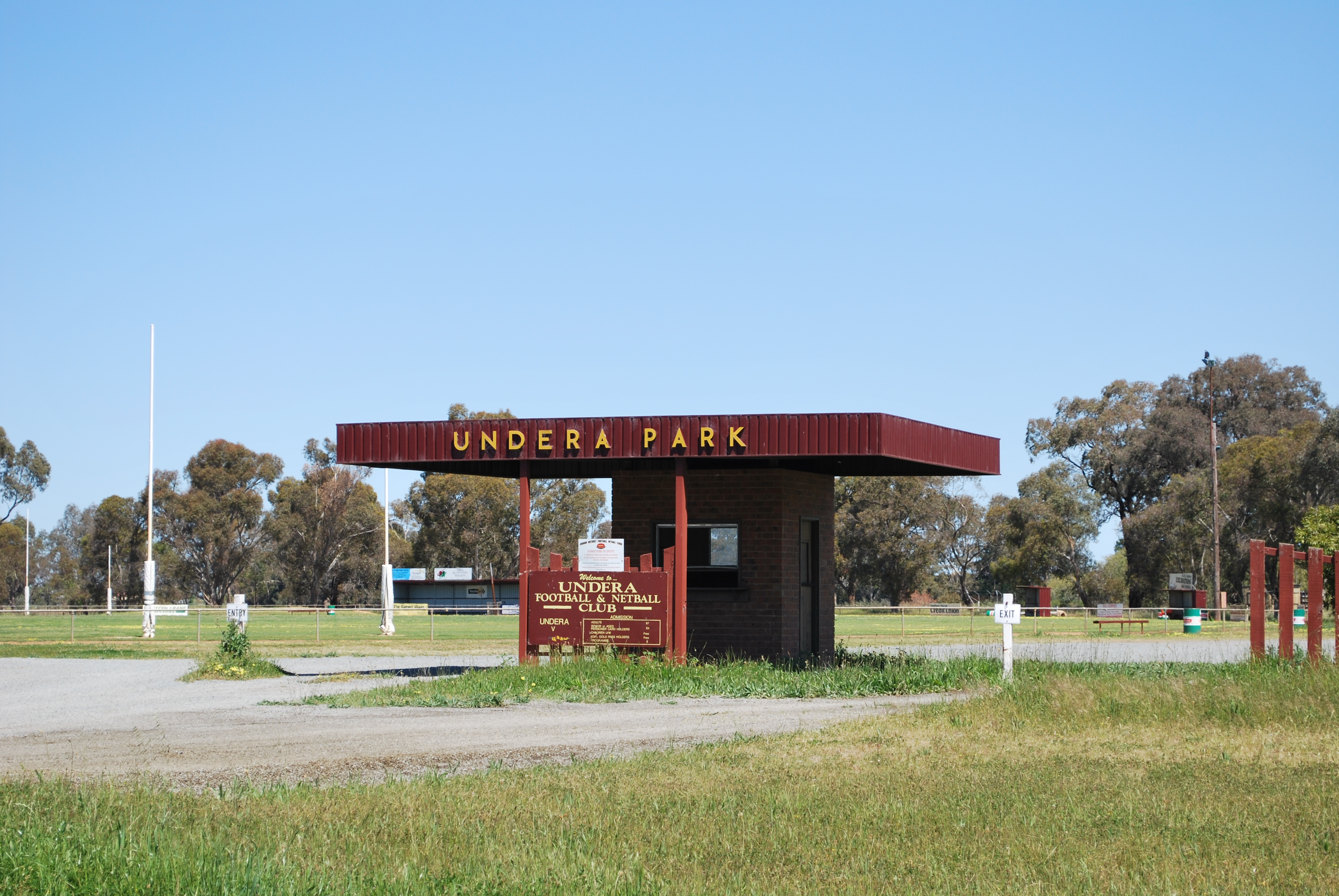
Undera Park

== Football Records ==
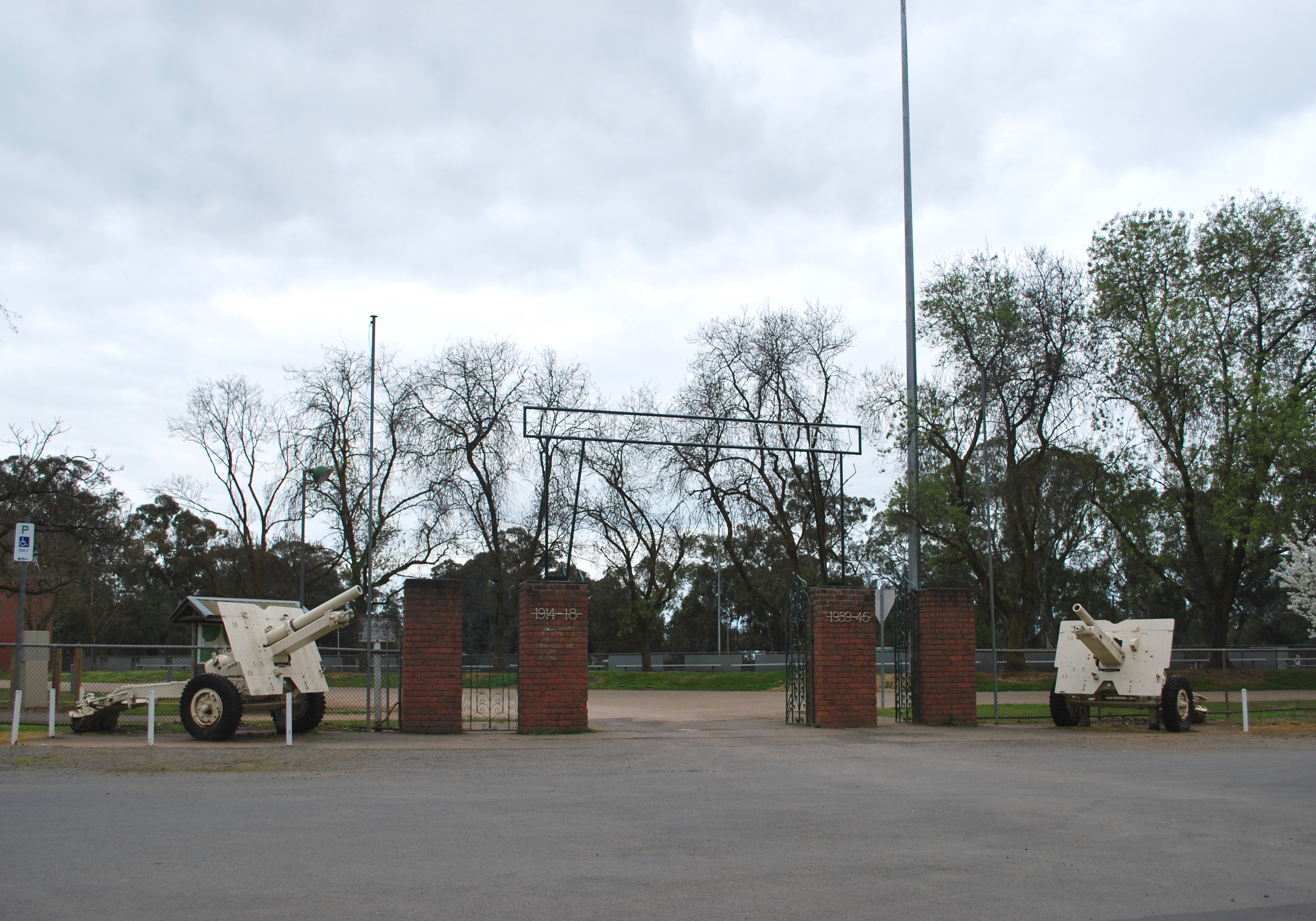
Violet Town War Memorial Gates

Seniors
Most flags in a row
4 – Shepparton East 1958–1961
Most consecutive grand finals
7 - Merrigum: 1947 to 1953 (Premiers: 1949, 50, 51 & 53)
Most goals in a grand final
12 - 1953: Les Pell - Merrigum
Highest score in a grand final
1967: Nagambie: 24.19 - 163 d Merrigum: 6.3 - 39
Highest overall score
Stanhope: 62.30 - 402 d Ardmona 0.1 - 1. Rd. 12, 6 July 2019
Most McNamara Medal / KDFNL best & fairest wins
4 - Rohan Aldous: 1988, 1998, 1999, 2000.
Most goals in a game
34 – Craig Whelan: Violet Town: 56.22 - 358 d Ardmona: 2.5 - 17. Rd. 12, 30 June 2012
Most goals in a season
173 – Perry Meka – Ardmona – 1992
Most wins in a row
35 – Lancaster 2001–2002, but lost the 2002 grand final to Ardmona.
Most losses in a row

- Ardmona FC Seniors: 61
  - 2015 - Losses: 5 - From Rd.16, 2015,
  - 2016 - Losses: 18
  - 2017 - Losses: 0 (Ardmona 1sts in recess in 2017)
  - 2018 - Losses: 18
  - 2019 - Losses:16,
  - 2020 - Losses: 0 KDFNL / Ardmona both in recess . COVID-19
  - 2021 - Losses: 4 Ardmona won against Longwood, Rd. 5, 2021. 2121 days since their last win.

== Senior Football Grand Finals ==
Seniors

Year	Premiers	Score	Runners up	Score	Captain/Coach	Venue	Gate
	Kyabram DFA						
1932	Lancaster	8.6 - 54	Kyabram Saturdays	7.7 - 49	W McKenzie	Wyuna	£2/10
1933	Kyabram Saturdays	6.11 - 47	Lancaster	6.6 - 42	Ross Cooper	Wyuna	£16/6/6
1934	Lancaster	9.4 - 58	Stanhope	8.8 - 56	F Schefferle	Kyabram	£29/11
1935	Lancaster	8.15 - 63	Stanhope	5.9 - 39	F Schefferle	Kyabram	£34/5
1936	Stanhope	13.10 - 88	Tongala	11.12 - 78	W Buzza	Kyabram	£33 9/6 11/
1937	Tongala	13.14 - 92	Lancaster	13.14 - 92	G Fraser	Kyabram	
1938	Stanhope	10.5 - 65	Tongala	9.7 - 61	Bert Pattison	Kyabram	
1939	Tongala	15.9 - 98	Stanhope	13.12 - 90	G Fraser	Kyabram	
1940	Tongala	9.11 - 65	Stanhope	4.8 - 32	G Fraser	Kyabram	£15 6/6
1941-43							In recess > WW2.
	Kyabram Patriotic FL						
1944	Stanhope	15.16 - 106	Ky Valley	8.15 - 63	A Pattison	Kyabram	£51/10/-
1945	Tongala	18.17 - 125	Stanhope	11.9 - 75	K Aldous	Kyabram	£97 2/6
	Kyabram DFA						
1946	POW Camp No.1	14.8 - 92	Undera	13.10 - 88		Kyabram	
1947	Undera	10.8 - 68	Merrigum	7.16 - 58	B Tyndell	Kyabram	"More than £50"
1948	Kyabram Imperials	12.14 - 86	Merrigum	9.14 - 68	W Connors	Kyabram	
1949	Merrigum	8.15 - 63	Kyabram Imperials	7.5 - 47	M Turnbull	Cooma	
1950	Merrigum	10.10 - 70	Lancaster	6.12 - 48		Kyabram	
1951	Merrigum	14.12 - 96	Girgarre	10.6 - 66	M Fitzgerald	Kyabram	
1952	Girgarre	8.12 - 60	Merrigum	4.9 - 33		Kyabram	
1953	Merrigum	24.11 - 155	Kyabram Boy's Club	11.15 - 81	J Davies	Kyabram	
1954	Kyabram Boy's Club	10.12 - 72	Lancaster	10.5 - 65	Lindsay Dillon	Kyabram	
1955	Undera	6.8 - 44	Lancaster	5.7 - 37	Dick Ough	Kyabram	£121
1956	Congupna	10.10 - 70	Merrigum	9.4 - 58			
1957	Merrigum	10.6 - 66	Congupna	6.6 - 42			
1958	Shepparton East	7.6 - 48	Merrigum	6.10 - 46			
1959	Shepparton East	4.8 - 32	Girgarre	1.7 - 13			
	Kyabram DFL						
1960	Shepparton East	11.12 - 78	Congupna	7.6 - 48			
1961	Shepparton East	9.4 - 58	Undera	7.12 - 54			
1962	Undera	14.6 - 90	Tallygaroopna	10.9 - 69			
1963	Tallygaroopna	14.11 - 95	Girgarre	13.16 - 94			
1964	Murchison	14.14 - 98	Merrigum	3.7 - 25			
1965	Nagambie	10.13 - 73	Tallygaroopna	9.7 - 61			
1966	Murchison	10.15 - 75	Nagambie	8.15 - 63			
1967	Nagambie	24.19 - 163	Merrigum	6.3 - 39			
1968	Undera	11.26 - 92	Merrigum	8.13 - 61			
1969	Nagambie	11.12 - 78	Tallygaroopna	5.6 - 36			
1970	Nagambie	11.8 - 74	Undera	8.9 - 57			
1971	Tallygaroopna	11.15 - 81	Nagambie	11.8 - 74			
1972	Undera	9.8 - 62	Tallygaroopna	7.10 - 52			
1973	Tallygaroopna	15.14 - 104	Lancaster	12.7 - 79			
1974	Tallygaroopna	19.11 - 125	Ardmona	9.13 - 67			
1975	Nagambie	10.19 - 79	Merrigum	14.13 - 97			
1976	Girgarre	17.13 - 115	Nagambie	14.13 - 97			
1977	Nagambie	16.13 - 109	Avenel	12.10 - 82			
1978	Avenel	15.13 - 103	Lancaster	9.13 - 67			
1979	Avenel	20.12 - 132	Undera	7.12 - 54			
1980	Lancaster	12.10 - 82	Avenel	8.9 - 57			
1981	Lancaster	13.12 - 90	Merrigum	8.17 - 65			
1982	Murchison	14.9 - 93	Avenel	10.14 - 74			
1983	Girgarre	12.5 - 77	Tallygaroopna	9.17 - 71			
1984	Avenel	17.9 - 111	Nagambie	12.14 - 86			
1985	Avenel	20.9 - 129	Nagambie	16.15 - 111			
1986	Merrigum	24.12 - 156	Avenel	9.9 - 63			
1987	Merrigum	16.16 - 112	Lancaster	12.6 - 78			
1988	Lancaster	19.19 - 133	Murchison	13.15 - 93			
1989	Avenel	13.7 - 85	Girgarre	10.12 - 72			
1990	Merrigum	15.19 - 109	Avenel	12.11 - 83			
1991	Girgarre	12.10 - 82	Lancaster	7.14 - 56			
1992	Lancaster	10.7 - 67	Ardmona	6.10 - 46			
1993	Ardmona	14.14 - 98	Lancaster	13.9 - 87			
1994	Avenel	23.12 - 150	Merrigum	16.8 - 104			
1995	Ardmona	13.7 - 85	Yea	9.15 - 69			
1996	Ardmona	20.6 - 126	Undera	7.6 - 48			
1997	Undera	18.8 - 126	Ardmona	11.6 - 72			
1998	Nagambie	10.17 - 77	Undera	8.8 - 56			
1999	Nagambie	24.5 - 149	Rushworth	10.6 - 66			
2000	Stanhope	23.11 - 149	Nagambie	11.11 - 77			
2001	Lancaster	14.17 - 101	Stanhope	9.11 - 65			
2002	Ardmona	21.12 - 138	Lancaster	12.20 - 92			
2003	Stanhope*	15.11 - 101	Lancaster	9.13 - 67			
2004	Rushworth	19.9 - 123	Lancaster	14.9 - 93			
2005	Tallygaroopna	9.9 - 63	Stanhope	9.8 - 62			
2006	Ardmona	15.9 - 99	Stanhope	14.13 - 93			
2007	Stanhope	18.13 - 121	Ardmona	4.10 - 34			
2008	Stanhope	17.14 - 116	Ardmona	10.6 - 66			
2009	Undera	16. 13 - 109	Nagambie	13. 14 - 92	Terry Mahoney	Mooroopna	
2010	Nagambie	12.17 - 89	Undera	10.14 - 74	Robert Auld	Mooroopna	
2011	Lancaster	17.9 - 111	Rushworth	9.13 - 67	Paul Burnett	Mooroopna	
2012	Violet Town	23.18 - 156	Undera	11.14 - 80	Hayden Lamaro	Mooroopna	
2013	Murchison	16.19 - 115	Stanhope	12.12 - 84	Steve Reeves	Mooroopna	
2014	Nagambie	18.12 - 120	Merrigum	13.7 - 85	Linc Sullivan	Mooroopna	
2015	Merrigum	11.9 - 75	Stanhope	8.2 - 50	Christian Barnett	Mooroopna	
2016	Nagambie	17.16 - 118	Avenel	15.10 - 100	Linc Sullivan	Mooroopna	
2017	Nagambie	21.16-142	Violet Town	13.11-89	Linc Sullivan	Mooroopna	
2018	Tallygaroopna	11.18 - 81	Nagambie	9.6 - 60	Kevin O'Donoghue	Mooroopna	
2019	Nagambie	18.9 - 117	Tallygaroopna	9.5 - 59	Anthony Haysom	Mooroopna	
2020							KDFNL in recess > COVID-19
2021	Lancaster	1st	Avenel	2nd	Tom Davies & Corey Carver		No finals series > COVID-19
2022	Lancaster	6.10 - 46	Murchison Toolamba	5.6 - 36	Tom Davies	Mooroopna	
2023	Lancaster	19.11 - 125	Nagambie	8.12 - 60	Tom Davies	Mooroopna	
2024	Murchison-Toolamba	13.13 - 91	Shepparton East	6.8 - 44	Brett Foley	Mooroopna	
2025	Murchison-Toolamba	13.8 - 87	Lancaster	12.13 - 85	Brett Foley	Mooroopna	
2026	Nagambie	13.14 - 92	Lancaster	11.19 - 85		Mooroopna	
Year	Premiers	Score	Runner up	Score	Captain / Coach	Venue	Gate

In 1944 and 1945, the competition was called the Kyabram District Patriotic Football League.

== Awards ==
=== Football Premierships ===
Year	Seniors	Reserves	Thirds	Fourths
2026	Nagambie	Lancaster	Nagambie	Stanhope
2025	Murchison-Toolamba	Stanhope	Tallygaroopna	Avenel
2024	Murchison-Toolamba (Premiers & Champions)	Murchison-Toolamba (Premiers & Champions)	Nagambie	Violet Town
2023	Lancaster	Lancaster	Violet Town	Dookie United
2022	Lancaster	Lancaster	Nagambie	No competition 1932-2022
2021	Lancaster: 1st	No premier awarded due to COVID-19 pandemic		No competition 1932-2022
2020	No Season	No Season	No Season	No competition 1932-2022
2019	Nagambie	Tallygaroopna	Lancaster	No competition 1932-2022
2018	Tallygaroopna	Stanhope	Lancaster	No competition 1932-2022
2017	Nagambie	Merrigum	Tallygaroopna	No competition 1932-2022
2016	Nagambie	Nagambie	Merrigum	No competition 1932-2022
2015	Merrigum	Lancaster	Lancaster	No competition 1932-2022
2014	Nagambie	Rushworth	Ardmona	No competition 1932-2022
2013	Murchison	Undera	Lancaster	No competition 1932-2022
2012	Violet Town	Tallygaroopna	Lancaster	No competition 1932-2022
2011	Lancaster	Lancaster	Tallygaroopna (Premiers & Champions)	No competition 1932-2022
2010	Nagambie	Stanhope	Murchison (Premiers & Champions)	No competition 1932-2022
2009	Undera	Undera	Rushworth	No competition 1932-2022
2008	Stanhope	Stanhope	Nagambie	No competition 1932-2022
2007	Stanhope	Lancaster	Violet Town	No competition 1932-2022
2006	Ardmona	Ardmona	Avenel	No competition 1932-2022
2005	Tallygaroopna	Stanhope	Avenel	No competition 1932-2022
2004	Rushworth	Tallygaroopna	Lancaster	No competition 1932-2022
2003	Stanhope (Premiers & Champions)	Stanhope	Merrigum	No competition 1932-2022
2002	Ardmona	Avenel	Merrigum	No competition 1932-2022
2001	Lancaster	Murchison	Stanhope	No competition 1932-2022
2000	Stanhope	Lancaster	Avenel	No competition 1932-2022
1999	Nagambie (Premiers & Champions)	Rushworth	Stanhope	No competition 1932-2022
1998	Nagambie	Rushworth	Lancaster	No competition 1932-2022
1997	Undera	Ardmona	Stanhope	No competition 1932-2022
1996	Ardmona	Ardmona	Stanhope	No competition 1932-2022
1995	Ardmona	Lancaster	Girgarre	No competition 1932-2022
1994	Avenel	Tallygaroopna	Avenel (Premiers & Champions)	No competition 1932-2022
1993	Avenel	Ardmona	Yea	No competition 1932-2022
1992	Lancaster	Lancaster	Yea	No competition 1932-2022
1991	Girgarre	Tallygaroopna	Merrigum	No competition 1932-2022
1990	Merrigum	Merrigum	Yea (Premiers & Champions)	No competition 1932-2022
1989	Avenel	Girgarre	Merrigum	No competition 1932-2022
1988	Lancaster	Yea	Merrigum	No competition 1932-2022
1987	Merrigum	Lancaster	Yea (Premiers & Champions)	No competition 1932-2022
1986	Merrigum	Merrigum	Yea (Premiers & Champions)	No competition 1932-2022
1985	Avenel	Avenel	Undera	No competition 1932-2022
1984	Avenel	Tallygaroopna	Avenel	No competition 1932-2022
1983	Girgarre	Nagambie	Avenel	No competition 1932-2022
1982	Murchison	Murchison	Nagambie	No competition 1932-2022
1981	Lancaster	Merrigum (Premiers & Champions)	Nagambie	No competition 1932-2022
1980	Lancaster	Lancaster	Murchison	No competition 1932-2022
1979	Avenel	Avenel	Avenel	No competition 1932-2022
1978	Avenel	Avenel	Lancaster	No competition 1932-2022
1977	Nagambie	Lancaster	Undera	No competition 1932-2022
1976	Girgarre	Ardmona	Nagambie (Premiers & Champions)	No competition 1932-2022
1975	Nagambie	Tallygaroopna	Girgarre	No competition 1932-2022
1974	Tallygaroopna	Tallygaroopna	Lancaster	No competition 1932-2022
1973	Tallygaroopna	Tallygaroopna	Girgarre	No competition 1932-2022
1972	Undera	Murchison	Ardmona	No competition 1932-2022
1971	Tallygaroopna	Girgarre	Ardmona	No competition 1932-2022
1970	Nagambie	Girgarre	Murchison	No competition 1932-2022
1969	Nagambie	Ardmona	No competition 1932-1969	No competition 1932-2022
1968	Undera	Ardmona	No competition 1932-1969	No competition 1932-2022
1967	Nagambie	Murchison	No competition 1932-1969	No competition 1932-2022
1966	Murchison	No competition 1932-1966	No competition 1932-1969	No competition 1932-2022
1965	Nagambie	No competition 1932-1966	No competition 1932-1969	No competition 1932-2022
1964	Murchison	No competition 1932-1966	No competition 1932-1969	No competition 1932-2022
1963	Tallygaroopna	No competition 1932-1966	No competition 1932-1969	No competition 1932-2022
1962	Undera	No competition 1932-1966	No competition 1932-1969	No competition 1932-2022
1961	Shepparton East	No competition 1932-1966	No competition 1932-1969	No competition 1932-2022
1960	Shepparton East	No competition 1932-1966	No competition 1932-1969	No competition 1932-2022
1959	Shepparton East	No competition 1932-1966	No competition 1932-1969	No competition 1932-2022
1958	Shepparton East	No competition 1932-1966	No competition 1932-1969	No competition 1932-2022
1957	Merrigum	No competition 1932-1966	No competition 1932-1969	No competition 1932-2022
1956	Congupna	No competition 1932-1966	No competition 1932-1969	No competition 1932-2022
1955	Undera	No competition 1932-1966	No competition 1932-1969	No competition 1932-2022
1954	Kyabram Youth Club	No competition 1932-1966	No competition 1932-1969	No competition 1932-2022
1953	Merrigum	No competition 1932-1966	No competition 1932-1969	No competition 1932-2022
1952	Girgarre	No competition 1932-1966	No competition 1932-1969	No competition 1932-2022
1951	Merrigum	No competition 1932-1966	No competition 1932-1969	No competition 1932-2022
1950	Merrigum	No competition 1932-1966	No competition 1932-1969	No competition 1932-2022
1949	Merrigum	No competition 1932-1966	No competition 1932-1969	No competition 1932-2022
1948	Kyabram Imperials	No competition 1932-1966	No competition 1932-1969	No competition 1932-2022
1947	Undera	No competition 1932-1966	No competition 1932-1969	No competition 1932-2022
1946	Camp No.1 (undefeated)	No competition 1932-1966	No competition 1932-1969	No competition 1932-2022
1945	Tongala	No competition 1932-1966	No competition 1932-1969	No competition 1932-2022
1944	Stanhope	No competition 1932-1966	No competition 1932-1969	No competition 1932-2022
1941-43	In recess > WW2	No competition 1932-1966	No competition 1932-1969	No competition 1932-2022
1940	Tongala	No competition 1932-1966	No competition 1932-1969	No competition 1932-2022
1939	Tongala	No competition 1932-1966	No competition 1932-1969	No competition 1932-2022
1938	Stanhope	No competition 1932-1966	No competition 1932-1969	No competition 1932-2022
1937	Tongala	No competition 1932-1966	No competition 1932-1969	No competition 1932-2022
1936	Stanhope	No competition 1932-1966	No competition 1932-1969	No competition 1932-2022
1935	Lancaster	No competition 1932-1966	No competition 1932-1969	No competition 1932-2022
1934	Lancaster	No competition 1932-1966	No competition 1932-1969	No competition 1932-2022
1933	Kyabram Saturdays	No competition 1932-1966	No competition 1932-1969	No competition 1932-2022
1932	Lancaster	No competition 1932-1966	No competition 1932-1969	No competition 1932-2022

=== Football Best & Fairest Winners ===
Seniors - McNamara Medal.

The Bryan McNamara Memorial Medal was instituted by Mrs Byran McNamara as her late husband was a keen supporter and volunteer of the Kyabram DFA. In 1958, Miepol's Ian Hughes polled votes in 17 out of 18 games, for a record total of 42 votes.

- 1946 – Keith Dunstall (Girgarre)
- 1947 – Bryan Tyndall (Undera)
- 1948 – Kevin Betson (Kyabram Imperials)
- 1949 – Peter Humphrey (Kyabram Imperials) & Ian Greening (Merrigum)
- 1950 – J.Brown (Girgarre)
- 1951 – Les Pell (Wyuna)
- 1952 – Elden Wade (Lancaster)
- 1953 – Ian Perry (Cooma) 19 votes
- 1954 – Laurance Doolan (Girgarre)
- 1955 – Peter Fry (Merrigum)
- 1956 – F.Salmon (Lancaster) & D.McKenna (Shepparton East)
- 1957 – W.Roe (Congupna)
- 1958 – Ian Hughes (Miepoll) (father of Merv Hughes)
- 1959 – G.Arthur (Girgarre)
- 1960 – J.Sellwood (Undera)
- 1961 – K.James (Miepoll)
- 1962 – J.Neal (Undera)
- 1963 – R.Doolan (Girgarre)
- 1964 – G.Cross (Murchison)
- 1965 – R.Moore (Nagambie)
- 1966 – A.Carson (Girgarre)
- 1967 – P.Sleeth (Undera)
- 1968 – Colin Barnes (Ardmona)
- 1969 – M.Varcoe (Girgarre) & N.Hosie (Tallygaroopna)
- 1970 – K.Chapman (Merrigum)
- 1971 – N.Langley (Girgarre)
- 1972 – D.McKellar (Ardmona)
- 1973 – P.Sleeth (Undera)
- 1974 – M.Black (Nagambie) & P.Sleeth (Undera)
- 1975 – B.Finnigan (Nagambie)
- 1976 – K.Atkinson (Murchison)
- 1977 – T.Gallagher (Nagambie)
- 1978 – L.Casey (Girgarre)
- 1979 – G.Saunders (Ardmona)
- 1980 – C.Gundrill (Undera)
- 1981 – N.Whittaker (Tallygaroopna)
- 1982 – G.Wallis (Girgarre)
- 1983 – W.Lee (Tallygaroopna)
- 1984 – E.Shiels (Nagambie)
- 1985 – Murray Black (Nagambie)
- 1986 – Ed.Shiels (Nagambie) & N.Whittaker (Tallygaroopna)
- 1987 – M.Rijs (Murchison) & P.White (Merrigum)
- 1988 – Rohan Aldous (Avenel)
- 1989 – M.Power (Tallygaroopna)
- 1990 – P.Cunningham (Yea)
- 1991 – P.Thorpe (Avenel)
- 1992 – Ed.Shiels (Nagambie)
- 1993 – Ed.Shiels (Nagambie)
- 1994 – R.Demarte (Lancaster)
- 1995 – R.Martin (Yea)
- 1996 – R.Martin (Yea)
- 1997 – L.O'Brien (Undera)
- 1998 – Rohan Aldous (Nagambie)
- 1999 – Rohan Aldous (Nagambie)
- 2000 – Rohan Aldous (Nagambie)
- 2001 – A.Thomas (Lancaster)
- 2002 – J.Waasdorp (Rushworth)
- 2003 – D.Harrison (Stanhope)
- 2004 – T. Sidebottom (Tallygaroopna)
- 2005 – B. Lowe (Ardmona)
- 2006 – A. Molisak (Tallygaroopna)
- 2007 – M. Shiels (Nagambie)
- 2008 – C. Eddy (Lancaster)& M. Young (Ardmona)
- 2009 – P. Burnett (Lancaster)
- 2010 – T. Snelson (Girgarre)
- 2011 – S. Thompson (Lancaster)
- 2012 – R. Lee (Violet Town)
- 2013 – J. Pell (Merrigum)
- 2014 – M. Shiels (Nagambie)
- 2015 – D. Stirling (Avenel)
- 2016 – K. Duncan (Avenel) 34 votes
- 2017 – S. Poole (Violet Town)
- 2018 - Kaine Herbert (Undera) 28 Votes
- 2019 - Kaine Herbert (Undera) 27 Votes
- 2020 - KDFNL in recess > COVID-19
- 2021 - Thomas Davies (Lancaster)
- 2022 - Jack Excell (Violet Town)
- 2023 - Braydon Avola (Avenel)
- 2024 - James Milne (Murchison-Toolamba), Blake Fothergill and Rielly Old (both Nagambie)
- 2025 - Liam Francis (Rushworth)
- 2026 - Josh Canny (Stanhope)

- 1940 winner, Keith Dunstall also won the GVFNL Morrison Medal in 1948 with Stanhope.
- 1968 winner, Colin Barnes also won the O&KFL best and fairest ward in 1960 and 1961.
- 2018 and 2019 winner, Kaine Herbert also won the O&KFL Baker Medal in 2016 with Bonnie Doon.

=== Leading Goal Kickers ===
Year	Player	Club	H&A goals	Finals goals	Total Goals
1958	R Adams	Miepoll	60		60
1959	Jim Baker	Cogupna Road	104	9	113
1960	William Tyquin	Shepparton East	67	1	68
1961	W Betson	Cogupna Road	87	4	91
1962	J Corken	Tallygaroopna	71	8	79
1963					0
1964	Jim Tweedle	Murchison	57	6	63
1965	Jim Tweedle	Murchison	85	10	95
1966	Dick Moore	Nagambie	135	0	135
1967	Brian Lodding	Nagambie	43	6	49
1968	Peter Mark	Undera	58	0	58
1969	Stan Atkinson	Ardmona	97	3	100
1970	Brian Lodding	Nagambie	67	2	69
1971	Col Jones	Tallygaroopna	76	1	77
1972	Rex Wright	Tallygaroopna	58	11	69
1973	Rex Wright	Tallygaroopna	47	6	53
1974	Stuart Florence	Ardmona	89	12	101
1975	Wayne Leppard	Merrigum	52	5	57
1976	Andrew Jones	Girgarre	87	7	94
1977	Murray Kick	Murchison	73	2	75
1978	Dennis Patterson	Merrigum	72	1	73
1979	Barry Freer	Undera	65	8	73
1980	Peter Law	Merrigum	71	8	79
1981	Peter Law	Merrigum	57	5	62
1982	Trevor Coulstock	Lancaster	79		79
1983	Trevor Coulstock	Lancaster	65		65
1984	William Hannam	Avenel	83	4	87
1985	Brian MacGibbon	Tallygaroopna	73		73
1986	Richard Ivey	Yea	120	6	126
1987	Robert Walters	Murchison	118	14	132
1988	Robert Walters	Murchison	84	11	95
1989	Robert Walters	Murchison	95	10	105
1990	Robert Walters	Murchison	100	12	112
1991	Darren Turner	Tallygaroopna	115	5	120
1992	Perry Meka	Ardmona	151	22	173
1993	Perry Meka	Ardmona	143	28	171
1994	Darren Block	Avenel	77		77
1995	Shane Loveless	Ardmona	125	27	152
1996	Shane Loveless	Ardmona	140	8	148
1997	David Giles	Undera	117	9	126
1998	Jodie Canavan	Stanhope	116		116
1999	Danny Irwin	Rushworth	119	19	138
2000	Gavin Exell	Stanhope	104	20	124
2001	Gavin Exell	Stanhope	112	23	135
2002	Damien Yze	Ardmona	129	25	154
2003	Gavin Exell	Stanhope	115	11	126
2004	Jodie Canavan	Rushworth	98	10	108
2005	Travis Wayman	Tallygaroopna	109	10	119
2006	Perry Meka	Ardmona	134	15	149
2007	Perry Meka	Ardmona	98	9	107
2008	Adrian Meka	Ardmona	97	6	103
2009	Sam LaPorta	Undera	88	22	110
2010	Sam LaPorta	Undera	111	12	123
2011	Sam LaPorta	Undera	96	14	110
2012	Brent Arho	Tallygaroopna	125	–	125
2013	Anthony Mellington	Murchison	75	7	82
2014	Patrick Rattray	Nagambie	100	15	115
2015	Matt Forys	Stanhope	110	23	133
2016	Robert Staff	Violet Town	114	2	116
2017	Robert Osborne	Rushworth	100	-	100
2018	Mathew Waterman	Nagambie			78
2019	Kasey Duncan	Avenel			58
2020	In recess>COVID-19				
2021	Josh Mellington	Violet Town			113
2022	Jack Excell	Violet Town	102	8	110
2023	James Lloyd	Murchison-Toolamba	64	10	74
2024	James Lloyd	Murchison-Toolamba	130	7	137
2025	James Lloyd	Murchison-Toolamba	97	5	102
2026	Tom Barnes	Nagambie	107	3	110

- 1982- Peter Ewart 69 (Murchison) and 11 in finals
- 1988- Brett Barnes 84 (Nagambie)and 3 goals in finals
- 1997- Shane Loveless 111 (Ardmona) and 28 goals in finals

Most individual goals in a match

- 34 - Craig Whelan (Violet Town) v Ardmona, 2012.
- 25 - Scott Turner (Tallygaroopna) v Nagambie, 1995.
- 25 - Shane Loveless (Ardmona) v Nagambie, 1997.

== Kyabram District Junior Football League ==
The Kyabram District Junior Football Association was formed on Saturday evening, 14th May 1910 at the Albion Hotel, Kyabram from delegates from the following club's - Cooma, Kyabram Imperials, Merrigum and Wyuna. The KDJFA disbanded in May, 1929 due to several clubs pulling out of this Wednesday competition and entering a newly formed Saturday football competition, the Central Goulburn Valley Junior Football Association.

Football Grand Finals
Seniors

Year	Premiers	Score	Runner up	Score	Grand Final Venue
1910	Merrigum	9.23 - 77	Lancaster	4.2 - 26	Merrigum
1911	Undera	7.9 - 51	Cooma	2.5 - 17	Kyabram
1912	Lancaster	1.2 - 8	Cooma	0.5 - 5	Kyabram
1913	Kyabram Imperials	3.6 - 24	Undera	2.2 - 14	Kyabram
1914	Kyabram Imperials	5.7 - 37	Wyuna	2.2 - 14	
1915-18					KDJFA in recess > WW1
1919	Lancaster	1.10 - 16	Tongala	2.2 - 14	Wyuna
1920	Tongala	3.3. - 21	Undera	2.2 - 14	Wyuna
1921	Wyuna	7.9 - 51	Tongala	5.11 - 41	Kyabram
1922	Wyuna	7.9 - 51	Undera	7.4 - 46	1st G Final. Kyabram
	Wyuna	10.18 - 78	Undera	4.4 - 28	2nd G Final. Kyabram
1923	Tongala	5.5 - 35	Kyabram Imperials	3.7 - 25	
1924	Kyabram Imperials	6.10 - 46	Wyuna	4.6 - 30	Kyabram
1925	Kyabram Imperials	9.8 - 62	Cooma	3.2 - 20	Wyuna
1926	Wyuna	7.8 - 50	Kyabram Saturdays	6.9 - 45	
1927	Kyabram Imperials	7.12 - 54	Wyuna	3.5 - 23	Kyabram
1928	Kyabram Imperials	12.12 - 84	Wyuna	9.5 - 59	Kyabram

== 2014 Ladder ==
Kyabram DFL	Wins	Byes	Losses	Draws	For	Against	%	Pts	Final	Team	G	B	Pts	Team	G	B	Pts
Merrigum	16	0	2	0	2146	1094	196.16%	64	Elimination	Stanhope	12	12	84	Lancaster	14	12	96
Nagambie	16	0	2	0	2074	1073	193.29%	64	Qualifying	Murchison	16	19	115	Avenel	13	4	82
Stanhope	15	0	3	0	1829	1039	176.03%	60	Semi	Murchison	16	7	103	Lancaster	13	12	90
Murchison	11	0	6	0	1806	1158	155.96%	44	Semi	Merrigum	14	8	92	Nagambie	7	16	58
Avenel	11	0	7	0	1391	1325	104.98%	44	Preliminary	Nagambie	13	10	88	Murchison	10	15	75
Lancaster	10	0	8	0	1517	1355	111.96%	40	Grand	Nagambie	18	12	120	Merrigum	13	7	85
Undera	10	0	8	0	1385	1268	109.23%	40									
Tallygaroopna	7	0	11	0	1267	1560	81.22%	28									
Ardmona	6	0	12	0	1140	1657	68.80%	24									
Rushworth	5	0	12	1	1349	1549	87.09%	22									
Violet Town	4	0	13	1	1285	1694	75.86%	18									
Girgarre	2	0	16	0	1029	2275	45.23%	8									
Longwood	2	0	15	0	879	2050	42.88%	8									

== 2015 Ladder ==
Kyabram DFL	Wins	Byes	Losses	Draws	For	Against	%	Pts	Final	Team	G	B	Pts	Team	G	B	Pts
Nagambie	17	2	1	0	2562	944	271.40%	76	Elimination	Stanhope	16	8	104	Violet Town	8	10	58
Merrigum	16	2	2	0	2510	807	311.03%	72	Qualifying	Avenel	15	12	102	Lancaster	14	12	96
Stanhope	14	2	4	0	2084	978	213.09%	64	Semi	Stanhope	19	17	131	Avenel	15	13	103
Avenel	13	2	5	0	2306	1222	188.71%	60	Semi	Merrigum	14	15	99	Nagambie	10	10	70
Lancaster	12	2	6	0	2331	1015	229.66%	56	Preliminary	Stanhope	17	12	114	Nagambie	12	16	88
Violet Town	11	2	7	0	1876	1324	141.69%	52	Grand	Merrigum	11	9	75	Stanhope	8	2	50
Murchison	10	2	8	0	1815	1496	121.32%	48									
Undera	9	2	9	0	1651	1282	128.78%	44									
Girgarre	5	2	13	0	1254	1825	68.71%	28									
Tallygaroopna	5	2	13	0	1284	1903	67.47%	28									
Ardmona	4	2	14	0	959	2678	35.81%	24									
Rushworth	1	2	17	0	728	3378	21.55%	12									
Longwood	0	2	18	0	648	3156	20.53%	8									

== 2016 Ladder ==
Kyabram DFL	Wins	Byes	Losses	Draws	For	Against	%	Pts	Final	Team	G	B	Pts	Team	G	B	Pts
Avenel	17	2	1	0	2295	973	235.87%	76	Elimination	Stanhope	15	4	94	Tallygaroopna	9	11	65
Nagambie	16	2	2	0	2199	757	290.49%	72	Qualifying	Merrigum	12	14	86	Violet Town	7	9	51
Stanhope	14	2	4	0	1867	911	204.94%	64	Semi	Stanhope	17	12	114	Merrigum	9	5	59
Violet Town	12	2	6	0	1845	1108	166.52%	56	Semi	Nagambie	15	17	107	Avenel	6	11	47
Merrigum	11	2	7	0	1506	1134	132.80%	52	Preliminary	Avenel	15	15	105	Stanhope	10	8	68
Tallygaroopna	10	2	8	0	1963	1032	190.21%	48	Grand	Nagambie	17	16	118	Avenel	15	10	100
Lancaster	10	2	8	0	1506	1164	129.38%	48									
Murchison	8	2	10	0	1533	1242	123.43%	40									
Girgarre	8	2	10	0	1361	1314	103.58%	40									
Rushworth	7	2	11	0	1242	1623	76.52%	36									
Undera	3	2	15	0	792	1950	40.62%	20									
Longwood	1	2	17	0	701	2496	28.08%	12									
Ardmona	0	2	18	0	248	3354	7.39%	8									

== 2017 Ladder ==
Kyabram DFL	Wins	Byes	Losses	Draws	For	Against	%	Pts	Final	Team	G	B	Pts	Team	G	B	Pts
Violet Town	16	2	2	0	2059	1054	195.35%	72	Elimination	Stanhope	15	14	104	Lancaster	3	8	26
Nagambie	15	2	3	0	2061	1097	187.88%	68	Qualifying	Tallygaroopna	13	15	93	Avenel	15	8	98
Stanhope	13	2	5	0	1767	1018	173.58%	60	Semi	Avenel	9	11	65	Stanhope	4	16	40
Avenel	12	2	6	0	1867	1044	178.83%	56	Semi	Nagambie	10	13	73	Violet Town	8	9	57
Tallygaroopna	12	2	6	0	2023	1016	199.11%	56	Preliminary	Violet Town	16	12	108	Avenel	8	9	57
Lancaster	11	2	7	0	1790	1049	170.64%	52	Grand	Nagambie	21	16	142	Violet Town	13	11	89
Murchison	10	2	8	0	1459	1272	114.70%	48									
Girgarre	9	2	9	0	1446	1093	132.30%	44									
Merrigum	8	2	10	0	1334	1484	89.89%	40									
Rushworth	5	2	13	0	1448	1678	86.29%	28									
Undera	3	2	15	0	654	2883	22.68%	20									
Longwood	3	2	15	0	1154	2574	44.83%	20									
Ardmona	0	0	0	0	0	1800	0.00%	0									
