= Kevin Betson =

Australian rules footballer

Personal information
- Full name: Kevin John Betson
- Born: 12 November 1929
- Died: 29 December 2012 (aged 83); Morwell, Victoria
- Original teams: Echuca East, Kyabram Imperials, Golden Square, Dunkeld, Echuca.
- Height: 187 cm (6 ft 2 in)
- Weight: 83 kg (183 lb)

Playing career^{1}
Years	Club	Games (Goals)
1952–55	Richmond	42 (2)
- ^{1} Playing statistics correct to the end of 1955.

Kevin John Betson (12 November 1929 – 29 December 2012) was an Australian rules footballer who played with Richmond in the Victorian Football League (VFL).

Betson won the 1948 Kyabram District Football League best and fairest award, the McNamara Medal, while playing with Kyabram Imperials and was a member of their 1948 premiership team too.

Richmond were chasing him in March, 1950 to come down to Melbourne and train.

Betson was runner up in the 1950 Western Districts Football League best and fairest award.
