= Miepoll =

Locality in Victoria, Australia

- Town
- Coordinates: 36°37′S 145°28′E
- Country: Australia
- State: Victoria
- Region: Hume
- LGA: Shire of Strathbogie

Population
  - Total: 223 (SAL 2021)

Miepoll is a locality in the Goulburn Valley region of Victoria, Australia.

== History ==
The place's name is derived from a local policeman's wife (My Poll).

In 1885, Miepoll consisted of Steven's Hotel, Store and Post Office, a blacksmith's shop, a State School and a Roman Catholic Church and school.

The Miepoll State School was erected in 1885.

In the 2011 census, Miepoll recorded a population of 304 people.

== Sport & Recreation ==
=== Miepoll Football Club ===
The Miepoll Australian Rules Football Club appears to have been established in 1902, when they played a match against Euroa.

Miepoll played in the Euroa & District Football Association between 1903 and 1949.

Miepoll played in five consecutive Euroa DFA grand finals between 1935 and 1939, winning premierships in 1937 and 1938.

The Mansell Brothers tied for the club's 1935 best and fairest award.

Miepoll then played in the Central Goulburn Valley Football League from 1950 to 1952.

In 1953, Miepoll joined the Euroa District Football League, but the Euroa DFL actually folded after the 1949 season.

Miepoll appears to have been in recess in 1953 and 1954, prior to joining the Kyabram District Football League in 1955 before folding in 1962.

Former Essendon footballer, Norm Betson initially played with the Miepoll Football Club.

Ian Hughes (father of Merv Hughes) won the 1958 Kyabram District Football League best and fairest, the McNamara Medal, when he was playing for Miepoll.

Premiers

- Euroa & District Football League
  - 1929 - Miepoll defeated Longwood by 20 points
  - 1937 - Miepoll defeated Strathbogie
  - 1938 - Miepoll: 9.10 - 64 defeated Euroa Seconds: 7.5 - 47

== Links ==
- 1929 - Euroa & District Football Association Premiers: Miepoll Football Club team photo via the Sun newspaper
- 1929 - Miepoll Football Club team phoro via The Weekly Times newspaper
