= Robert Walters (footballer) =

Australian rules footballer

Personal information
- Full name: Robert Walters
- Born: 13 November 1955 (age 70)
- Original team: Romsey
- Height: 193 cm (6 ft 4 in)
- Weight: 99 kg (218 lb)

Playing career^{1}
Years	Club	Games (Goals)
1977–81	Melbourne	25 (46)
- ^{1} Playing statistics correct to the end of 1981.

Robert Walters (born 13 November 1955) is a former Australian rules footballer who played with Melbourne in the Victorian Football League (VFL).

Walters won the Kyabram District Football League's goalkicking four years in row between 1987 and 1990, whilst playing for Murchison.
