= Tallygaroopna Football Club =

Tallygaroopna

Names
- Full name: Tallygaroopna Football Netball Club
- Nickname(s): Road Runner

Club details
- Founded: 1904
- Colours: Navy Blue with Red Chevron
- Competition: Kyabram & District Football League
- Premierships: Seniors – 1949, 1963, 1971, 1973, 1974, 2005, 2018
- Ground(s): Tallygaroopna Recreation Reserve, Smith Street

Other information
- Official website: http://www.tallygaroopnafnc.sportingspulse.net

Tallygaroopna Football Netball Club is an Australian rules football club that competes in the Kyabram & District Football League.

The club was established in 1904 and initially competed in the Southern Division of the Goulburn Valley Football Association, and has now competed in the Kyabram & District Football League since 1958.

The club is based in the town of Tallygaroopna in North Eastern Victoria, situated 18 km north of Shepparton.

The club is known as "The Redlegs".

== Football Premierships ==
- Goulburn Valley Football Association (1905–1929)
  - 1915 (Season abandoned in July, 1915. Tallygaroopna declared premiers)
- Goulburn Valley Football League – 2nd XVIII (1930–1940)
  - Nil
- Central Goulburn Valley Football League (1947–1952)
  - 1949 (CGVFL Reserves)
- Picola & District Football League (1953–1957)
  - Nil
- Kyabram District Football Netball League (1958 – present)
  - Seniors
    - 1963, 1971, 1973, 1974, 2005, 2018*
    Reserves
    - 1973, 1974, 1975, 1984, 1991, 1994, 2004, 2012, 2019
    Under 18
    - 2011, 2017

== Netball Premierships ==
Kyabram District Football Netball League

- A Grade
  - 2008
  B Grade
  - 1986, 2003, 2005, 2006, 2008, 2014, 2019
  C Grade
  - 1995, 2001, 2003, 2005, 2016, 2017, 2019*
  C Reserve
  - 2019*
  15 & Under
  - 2015

*Premiers & Champions
