= Girgarre Football Club =

Girgarre FNC

Names
- Full name: Girgarre Football Netball Club
- Nickname(s): Kangaroos

Club details
- Founded: 1920
- Colours: Blue White
- Competition: Kyabram DFL since 1932
- Premierships: 1952, 1976, 1983, 1991.
- Ground(s): Girgarre Recreation Reserve

Girgarre Football Club is an Australian rules football club based in the Goulburn Valley region, Victoria, Australia. The club is known as "the Kangaroos".

== History ==
Girgarre was established in 1920 and has competed in the Kyabram District Football Association (KDFA) since 1932. Girgarre is a small town in Goulburn Valley, Victoria.

In 1939, Girgarre pulled out of the KDFA on the eve of the season, due to a shortage of players, but returned to the KDFA in 1940.

Girgarre and Stanhope merged between 1948 and 1955 and enter one senior and reserves team in the Goulburn Valley Football League, Girgarre also returned to the Kyabram District Football Association in 1949 as a stand alone side.

== Football Premierships ==
Seniors

- Kyabram District Football League
  - 1952
  - 1976
  - 1983
  - 1991

== Football Runners Up ==
Seniors

- Kyabram District Football League
  - 1951, 1959, 1963, 1989,

== Football League Best & Fairest Winners ==
Seniors

- Kyabram District Football League
  - 1946 - K. Dunstall
  - 1950 - J. Brown
  - 1954 - L. Doolan
  - 1959 - G. Arthur
  - 1963 - R. Doolan
  - 1966 - A. Carson
  - 1969 - M. Varcoe (tied)
  - 1971 - N. Langley
  - 1978 - L. Casey
  - 1982 - G. Wallis

== Leading Goal Kickers ==
- Kyabram District Football League
  - 1976 - Andrew Jones: 87 goals
  - 2022 - Damian Cupido: 105 goals

== Stanhope / Girgarre FC ==
In March 1948, Girgarre and Stanhope decided to merge and entered their "senior" team in the Goulburn Valley Football League and their "reserves" team in the Kyabram District Football Association. Only one week later, the Girgarre / Stanhope FC later decided to enter their "reserves" side into the newly formed Goulburn Valley Football League Reserves competition. This merged entity was in force between 1948 and 1955. In 1956, the club de-merged and Stanhope remained in the Goulburn Valley Football League and Girgarre played in the Kyabram District Football Association.

Year	1sts Ladder Position	1sts Best & Fairest	1sts Coach	2nds Ladder Position	2nds Best & Fairest	Competition
1948	2nd	Keith Dunstall		4th	Haw	GVFL
1949	8th	H A Connolly		4th	Cecil Wright	GVFL
1950	10th	Aub Downing &		9th	Cecil Wright	GVFL
		Mick Keating				
1951	10th	Mick Keating		7th	N Hadfield	GVFL
1952	10th	Roy Barrett		9th	D Crilly	GVFL
1953	7th	Roy Barrett	Tom Ryan	6th	Pat McCarty	GVFL
1954	6th	Keith Dunstall	Tom Ryan	7th	Alan Linford	GVFL
1955	9th		Tom Ryan	8th		
1956			Vic Lawrence			

League Best & Fairest Awards

- Goulburn Valley Football League - Morrison Medal
  - 1948 - Keith "Snowy" Dunstall
  - 1952 - Roy Barrett
