= Longwood Football Club =

Australian rules football club

Longwood Football Netball Club
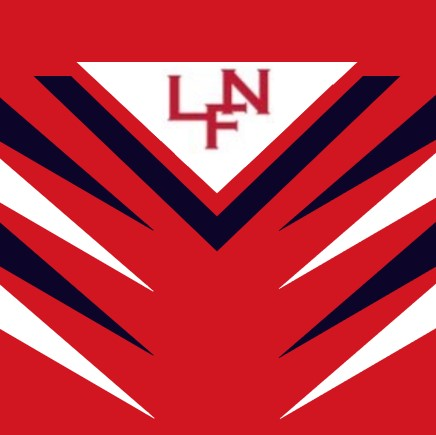

Names
- Full name: Longwood Football Netball Club
- Nickname: Redlegs

Club details
- Founded: 1888
- Colours
- Competition: Kyabram DFL since 2010
- Premierships: (11) 1906, 1908, 1924, 1930, 1934, 1935, 1936, 1953, 1977, 1985, 2000.
- Ground: Longwood Recreation Reserve

Other information
- Official website: Longwood FNC website

The Longwood Football Netball Club was established in 1888 and is an Australian rules football club which competes in the Kyabram DFL since 2010. They are based in the Victorian town of Longwood.

== History ==
Longwood Football Club was formed in 1888 and played their first match at Longwood against a combined Castle Creek and Euroa football team in May, 1888.

Longwood joined the Kyabram DFL in 2010 after the Benalla & District Football League folded at the end of 2009.

== Football Competitions Timeline ==
- 1890 - Sutherland Cup competition
- 1891 - 1892: North Eastern Football Association
- 1894 - Euroa District Football Association
- 1895 - 1900: North Eastern Football Association.
- 1901 - 1903: Club active, but no official competition football.
- 1904 - 1908: Euroa District Football Association
- 1909 - 1912: North Eastern Football Association.
- 1913 - 1914: Euroa District Football Association
- 1915 - 1919: Club in recess, due to WW1.
- 1920 - 1921: Euroa District Football Association
- 1922 - Longwood FC went into recess, due to a player shortage.
- 1923 - 1937: Euroa District Football Association
- 1938 - 1945: Club in recess, due to WW2.
- 1946 - 1949: Euroa District Football Association
- 1950 - 1954: Longwood was a part of the Hume Highway Football League.
- 1955 - Longwood was a part of the Waranga North East Football Association 2nd XVIII competition.
- 1956 to 1969: Longwood was a part of the Avenel-Longwood Football Club in the Waranga North East Football Association 2nd XVIII competition.
- 1970 to 2009: Longwood reformed in its own right and played in the Benalla & District Football League. They competed in this league until it folded after the 2009 season.
- 2010 - 2024: Kyabram & District Football League

== Football Premierships ==
Seniors

- Euroa District Football Association:
  - 1906 - Longwood: 6.10 - 46 d Euroa: 4.7 - 71
  - 1908 - Longwood defeated Euroa. Euroa refused to play the grand final at Longwood.
  - 1924 - Longwood: 9.14 - 68 d Euroa Imperials: 6.6 - 42
  - 1930 - Euroa Imperials defeated Longwood by 16 points, but Longwood were later awarded the premiership on appeal.
  - 1934 - Longwood: 7.16 - 58 d Violet Town: 3.10 - 28
  - 1935 - Longwood: 9.14 - 68 d Miepoll: 3.10 - 28
  - 1936 - Longwood: 16.21 - 117 d Miepoll: 14.16 - 100
- Hume Highway Football League:
  - 1953 - Longwood: 12.4 - 76 d Strathbogie: 8.9 - 57
- Benalla & District Football League:
  - 1977 - Longwood: 17.4 - 106 d Benalla All Blacks: 8.19 - 67
  - 1985 - Longwood: 23.13 - 151 d Goorambat: 12.6 - 78
  - 2000 - Longwood: 18.12 - 120 d - Devenish: 10.5 - 65

== Runners Up ==
Senior Football

- Euroa District Football Association
  - 1905, 1909, 1913, 1914, 1920, 1927, 1928, 1929.
- Hume Highway Football League
  - 1951, 1952
- Benalla & District Football League
  - 1973, 1986, 1995, 2002
