= Shepparton Football Club =

Shepparton

Names
- Full name: Shepparton Football Netball Club
- Nickname(s): Bears

Club details
- Founded: 1879
- Colours
- Competition: Goulburn Valley Football League
- Coach: Sean Harrap
- Captain(s): Ted Lindon
- Premierships: 27
- Ground(s): Deakin Reserve, Shepparton (capacity: 10,000)

Uniforms
Home

Other information
- Official website: sheppartonfnc.com.au

The Shepparton Football Netball Club, nicknamed the Bears, is an Australian rules football and netball club in the Goulburn Valley Football League. The Shepparton Bears, a local football team, play their home games at Deakin Reserve, Shepparton's premier football ground. The Bears, once known as the Maroons, are based in Shepparton. They share the ground with the Shepparton United Football Club.

== History ==
Competitive football began in the Shepparton region in the 1879, with a published match review of game between Mooroopna and Shepparton.

But it wasn't until the formation of the Goulburn Valley Football Association, in 1888 comprising the following teams – Baldwinsville, Mooroopna, Shepparton, Tatura and Undera, with Mooroopna winning the title in 1890, Undera defeating Mooroopna to win the 1891 – Elder's Hotel (Undera) Medals and then Shepparton winning the title in 1892, that a formal structure for the sport was established. The Association provided a framework for teams to compete in a league, with a coherent set of rules and regulations.

Shepparton then joined the Goulburn Valley District Football Association in 1893 and was one of the six founder member clubs.

In 1896, the Shepparton FC and Shepparton Ramblers FC merged to form the "Shepparton and Ramblers FC" and wore the following colors - blue and white jumper, with a yellow band, white knicks and black and yellow socks.

The Shepparton Bears were incredibly successful in the early years of the GVDFA, winning their first flag (championship) in 1899. This was followed by another flag in 1903, and a run of six premierships from 1906 to 1914, interrupted only by the First World War. The Shepparton Bears were undoubtedly the dominant team in the region during this period. From 1911 until early in the 1913 season in particular, Shepparton was widely regarded, and indeed often described in the local press, as ‘invincible’. At the end of the 1913 season, this evaluation was further enhanced when Shepparton beat South Bendigo by 3 points in a special challenge match for ‘the championship of the north’.

After World War I, Shepparton continued to enjoy regular success, but they left the GVFL in 1939 because the league decided to change from a Wednesday competition to a Saturday. They joined the Central Goulburn Valley Football League and only returned to the GVFL in 1951.

In 1961, the club appointed Tom Hafey, a former back pocket player with Richmond, who preached a fast-paced, aggressive, highly team-orientated football. Hafey coached the club to a hattrick of flags before Richmond offered him the main coaching position in the VFL. Hafey made sure to sign the best young talent in the GVFL and in his second year got the Tigers a flag.

The introduction of zoning in 1968 meant that Shepparton was assigned to the Melbourne recruiting region.

Further premierships followed in 1968-9 under Ken Rowe, and in 1972-3 under Bill Sykes. Since then, the club has enjoyed only sporadic success, at least by its own lofty standards, but there is little doubt that dynastic potential still simmers not far beneath the surface.

== Football Premierships ==
Seniors

League	Total flags	Premiership years
Goulburn Valley Football Association	1	1892,
Goulburn Valley Football League	27	1899, 1903, 1906, 1908, 1909, 1911, 1912, 1913, 1920, 1925, 1929, 1934, 1951, 1957, 1963, 1964, 1965, 1966, 1968, 1969, 1972, 1973, 1978, 1993, 1994, 2000, 2018
Central Goulburn Valley Football League	1	1949

== VFL/AFL players ==
- Steven King – Geelong, St Kilda
- Shannon Byrnes – Geelong
- David Code – Melbourne
- Lachlan Ash – Greater Western Sydney
- Will Brodie – Fremantle
- Jordon Butts – Adelaide
- Peter Maynard – Melbourne
- Jarman Impey - Hawthorn
