= Merrigum =

- Town
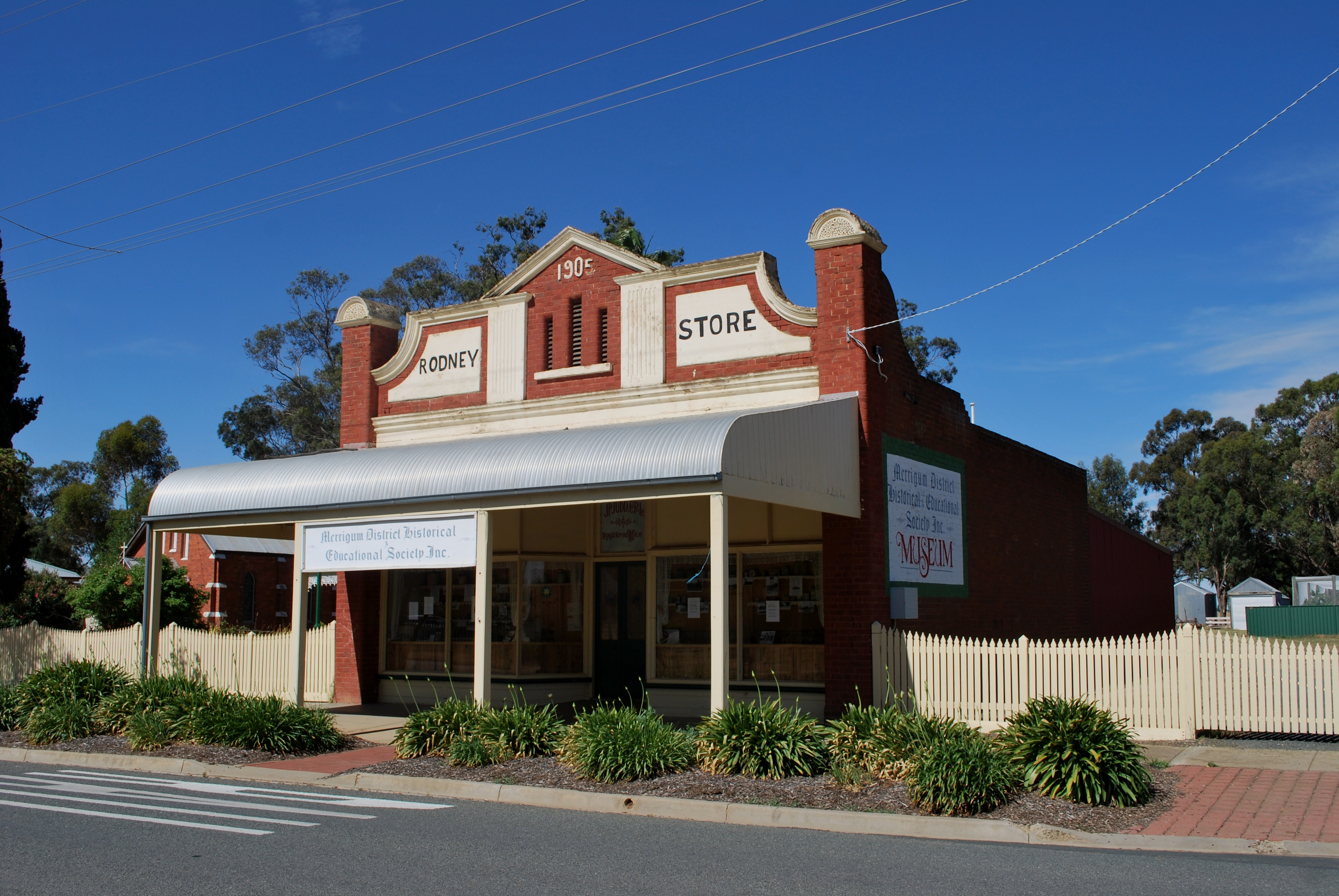
- Museum

- Interactive map of Merrigum
- Coordinates: 36°22′S 145°08′E
- Country: Australia
- State: Victoria
- Region: Hume
- LGA: City of Greater Shepparton
- Location: 197 km (122 mi) N of Melbourne; 30 km (19 mi) W of Shepparton; 14 km (8.7 mi) SE of Kyabram

Government
  - State electorates: Euroa; Murray Plains
  - Federal division: Nicholls

Population
  - Total: 454 (2021 census)
- Postcode: 3618

Merrigum is a town in the Goulburn Valley region of Victoria, Australia. The town is in the City of Greater Shepparton local government area, 197 kilometres (122 mi) north of the state capital, Melbourne. At the 2021 census, Merrigum had a population of 454.

Merrigum Post Office opened on 1 February 1875.

== Sports ==
The Merrigum Football Netball Club fields Australian Rules football and netball teams in the Kyabram District Football Netball League.

Golfers play at the course of the Merrigum Golf Club, an 18 hole course with a 70 Par

== Museum ==
The Merrigum Museum was a general store and residence built in 1905.

It holds an annual Heritage Day event in April; some featuring events are as follows: blacksmithing, sheep shearing, logging, traction machines, woodworking, butter churning, and a confectionery shop.

== See also ==
- Merrigum Football Club
- Merrigum railway station, Victoria
