= Lancaster Football Club =

Lancaster

Names
- Full name: Lancaster Football Netball Club
- Nickname(s): Wombats

Club details
- Founded: 1910
- Colours: Yellow Blue
- Competition: Kyabram DFL since 1932
- Premierships: 1912, 1919, 1932, 1980, 1981, 1988, 1992, 2001, 2011, 2022, 2023.
- Ground(s): Lancaster Recreation Reserve

Lancaster Football Club is an Australian Rules Football team based in Lancaster, North Eastern Victoria, Australia.

The team is known as The Wombats.

== History ==
The club was established in 1910 and joined the Kyabram District Junior Football Association. Lancaster then entered the Kyabram & District Football League in 1932.

== Honours ==
=== Football Premierships ===
Seniors

- Kyabram Junior Football Association (1910 - 19)
  - 1912
  - 1919
- Kyabram & District Football League
  - 1932
  - 1980 - Lancaster: 12.10 - 82 d Avenel: 8.9 - 57
  - 1981 - Lancaster: 13.12 - 90 d Merrigum: 8.17 - 65
  - 1988 - Lancaster: 19.19 - 133 d Murchison: 13.15 - 93
  - 1992, 2001, 2011, 2022, 2023

Reserves

- Kyabram & District Football League
  - 1977, 1987, 1992, 1995, 2000, 2007, 2011, 2015*, 2022, 2023*
  - 1980 - Lancaster: 8.4 - 52 d Merrigum: 6.6 - 42
- - (* undefeated premiers)

=== KDFL Senior Best & Fairest Winners ===
- 1952 Elden Wade
- 1956 F.Salmon (tied)
- 1994 R.Demarte
- 2001 A.Thomas
- 2008 C.Eddy
- 2009 P.Burnett
- 2011 S.Thomson
- 2021 T.Davies

=== KDFL Reserves Best & Fairest Winner ===
- 2007 Roy Emini
- 2008 Anthony 'Rusty' McDonell
- 2009 Anthony 'Rusty' McDonell
- 2015 Harley Honig
- 2023 Dean Moore

=== KDFL Leading Goal Kickers ===
- 1982 T. Coulstock 79
- 1983 T. Coulstock 65

== Links ==
- 1954 - Lancaster FC team photo
