= Merrigum Football Club =

Merrigum FNC

Names
- Full name: Merrigum Football Netball Club
- Nickname: Bulldogs

Club details
- Founded: 1902; 124 years ago
- Colours
- Competition: Kyabram District Football League (since 1933)
- Premierships: 1910, 1928, 1949, 1950, 1951, 1953, 1957, 1986, 1987, 1990, 2015.
- Ground: Merrigum Recreation Reserve

Uniforms
Home

Other information
- Official website: Merrigum FNC website

Merrigum Football Club is an Australian rules football club based in Merrigum in the Goulburn Valley region, Victoria, Australia. The club is known as The Bulldogs.

== History ==
The first evidence of football in the Merrigum area was in 1902, when the football club applied to the Park Trustees to erect goals on the local oval.

In 1905, Merrigum hosted Cooma in a game and won by one point.

Merrigum lost their 1932 Goulburn Valley Central Junior Football League 1st semi final to Stanhope prior to joining the Kyabram & District Football League in 1933.

== Football Timeline ==
- 1902 - 1908: No official competition matches, but did play against other local football sides.
- 1909 - East and West Goulburn Football Association
- 1910 - 1911: Kyabram Junior Football Association
- 1912 - Club in recess, insufficient number to enter a team in the Kyabram Junior Football Association.
- 1913 - Kyabram Junior Football Association
- 1914 - Club in recess
- 1915 - Kyabram District Football Association. Merrigum withdrew from the KDFA in July, 1915.
- 1916 - 1920: Club in recess due to WW1
- 1921 - Kyabram Junior Football Association
- 1922 - Club in recess
- 1923 - 1924: Ardmona Central Junior Football Association
- 1925 - Kyabram Junior Football Association
- 1926 - 1929: Northern Goulburn Valley Football League
- 1930 - 1932: Central Goulburn Valley Junior Football League
- 1933 - Kyabram District Football Association
- 1934 - Kyabram District Football Association In 1934, Merrigum merged with Byrneside to form Merrigum-Byrneside FC.
- 1935 - 1939: Kyabram District Football Association. In 1935 Merrigum FC reformed under their old name.
- 1940 - 1943: Club in recess due to WW2.
- 1944 - 1945: Kyabram District Patriotic Football League. In 1944, Merrigum FC reformed.
- 1946 - 2024: Kyabram District Football League.

== Football Premierships ==
Seniors

- Kyabram District Junior Football Association
  - 1910 - Merrigum: 9.23 - 77 d Lancaster: 4.2 - 26
- Northern Goulburn Valley Football League
  - 1928 - Merrigum: 5.9 - 39 d Moama: 2.10 - 22
- Kyabram District Football League
  - 1949 - Merrigum: 8.15 - 63 d Kyabram Imperials: 7.5 - 47
  - 1950 - Merrigum: 10.10 - 70 d Lancaster: 6.12 - 48
  - 1951 - Merrigum: 14.12 - 96 d Girgarre: 10.6 - 66
  - 1953 - Merrigum: 24.11 - 155 d Kyabram Boy's Club: 11.15 - 81
  - 1957 - Merrigum:
  - 1986 - Merrigum: 24.12 - 156 d Avenel: 9.9 - 63
  - 1987 - Merrigum: 16.16 - 112 d Lancaster: 12.6 - 78
  - 1990 - Merrigum:
  - 2015 - Merrigum: 11.9 - 75 d Stanhope: 8.2 - 50

Reserves

- Kyabram District Football League
  - 1981 - Merrigum: 10.9 - 69 d Avenel: 3.6 - 24
  - 1986 - Merrigum: 17.7 - 109 d Avenel: 10.7 - 67
  - 1990 - Merrigum:

Thirds

- Kyabram District Football League
  - 1988
  - 1989
  - 1991
  - 2002
  - 2003
  - 2016

== Football Runner Up ==
Seniors

- Cooma Football Association (1922)
  - 1922 - Stanhope: 3.14 - 32 d Merrigum: 2,4 - 16
- Kyabram District Football League
  - 1947 - Undera: 10.8 - 68 d Merrigum: 7.16 - 58
  - 1948 - Kyabram Imperials: 12.14 - 86 d Merrigum: 9.14 - 68
  - 1952 - Girgarre: 8.12 - 60 d Merrigum: 4.9 - 33
  - 1956 - Comgupna: 10.10 - 70 d Merrigum: 9.4 - 58
  - 1964 - Murchison: 14.14 - 98 d Merrigum: 3.7 - 25

Reserves

- Kyabram District Football League
  - 1980 - Lancaster: 8.4 - 52 d Merrigum: 6.6 - 42
  - 1996

Thirds

- Kyabram District Football League

== Football Best and Fairest winners ==
Seniors

- Kyabram District Football League
  - 1949: Ian Greening
  - 1955: Peter Fry
  - 1970: K Chapman
  - 1987: P White
  - 2013: J Pell
