= Rushworth Football Club =

Australian rules football club

Rushworth Football / Netball Club

Names
- Full name: Rushworth Football Netball Club
- Nickname: The Tigers
- Club song: Tigerland

2022 season
- Home-and-away season: 13th

Club details
- Founded: 1882; 144 years ago
- Colours: Black Gold
- Competition: Kyabram & District Football League
- President: Peta Williams
- Coach: Jason Hucker
- Ground: Ironbark Stadium (capacity: Around 3,000)

Uniforms
Home

The Rushworth Football Club is an Australian rules football club based in the town of Rushworth, Victoria, Australia. The club is one of 12 member clubs in the Kyabram & District Football League and are known as the 'Tigers'. They wear a black jumper with horizontal gold stripe.

== History ==
The old gold-mining town of Rushworth was established during the 1850s and grew rapidly. At its peak during the late nineteenth and early twentieth centuries there were no fewer than twenty-six working mines in the locality supporting a floating population that on occasion was reckoned to number as many as 40,000 inhabitants. Football was definitely being played in the area as early as the 1870s but the Rushworth Football Club was not formed until 1882. Its first published match was in May, 1887 against Heathcote in Heathcote and did not officially affiliate with a league or association until 1897, when it was a founding member, along with Murchison, Nagambie and Whroo, of the Upper Goulburn Football Association. Prior to world war one Rushworth also spent time as a member of the Goulburn Valley Football Association (1900–12) and the Waranga North East Football League (1913–14).

By the 1930s Rushworth's most prosperous days were well behind it, and indeed the severe economic depression of that time had such an inimical impact on the town that its very survival was threatened. It is somewhat paradoxical therefore that the 1930s saw the Rushworth Football Club achieving the most sustained and significant successes in its history, including a then-unprecedented four Goulburn Valley Football League premierships in a row between 1930 and 1933. Rushworth had returned to the Goulburn Valley competition when football had resumed after the Great War, and over the ensuing decade the team's performances had steadily improved. The 1929 season brought Rushworth's inaugural GVFL grand final, the first of ten that the side was to contest over a twelve-season period. Five of these were won, with seven consecutive grand finals between 1929 and 1935, making the Tigers, without doubt, the pre-eminent football force in the competition during the 1930s.

Fred Honeychurch coached Rushworth to their first premiership in 1930, while Tim Hawkings captained Rushworth from 1931 to 1933.

During the 1940s and 1950s country football in Victoria gradually became more outwardly professional, and hence more expensive to administer, a state of affairs that made life increasingly difficult for small clubs such as Rushworth. By the 1960s it seemed clear that the club had two choices: it could either struggle on in the GVFL, becoming increasingly less competitive as well as economically poorer until it reached the point where it had little option other than to roll over and die, or it could down-size. Swallowing a hefty dose of pride, Rushworth bravely opted for the latter course of action, and the 1965 season saw it fielding teams in the somewhat lower profile, but still intensely competitive, Heathcote District Football League.

In 1965, the club's first season in the Heathcote District Football League, both the senior and reserve teams won premierships. The senior team won its first premiership in three decades, while the reserves won their first.

The Tigers maintained their involvement in the HDFL until 1998, contesting half a dozen senior grand finals for wins in 1965, 1969 and 1977. However, just as had been the case in the GVFL earlier in the century, the team increasingly found the going difficult, and in 1998 it was deemed necessary to make what amounted to another calculated narrowing of focus by crossing to the Kyabram District Football League.

Once again, the decision was fairly swiftly ratified as the seniors made the finals in their first season, before contesting their first grand final in twenty-two years in 1999. Nagambie proved to have the Tigers’ measure on that occasion, but it was nevertheless clear that the Rushworth Football Club had found a playing level commensurate with the team's ability. In 2004 this impression was reinforced when the senior team lost only 1 match out of 16 during the home and away rounds to advance to the finals as minor premier. Consecutive 30 point victories over Stanhope and Lancaster then gave the Tigers their first senior grade flag in more than a quarter of a century.

More recently, Rushworth made the 2011 grand final from fifth, but went down to Lancaster by 44 points in the elimination final. The last half a dozen seasons have seen the Tigers finish ninth (2013), tenth (2014), twelfth (2015), and tenth (both 2016 and 2017) and thirteenth (2018). Their last finals appearance came in 2012 when they finished fifth.

Given that the town of Rushworth has a population of around 1,000, its football team operates within a local tradition established in the middle of the nineteenth century following European settlement driven by gold mining in the area.

In February, 2023, Rushworth made the difficult decision to pull their senior side out of the Kyabram District Football League competition.

=== Football Timeline ===
- 1882 - 1896: Club active and played other local sides.
- 1897 - 1899: Upper Goulburn Football Association
- 1908 - 1912: Goulburn Valley Football Association
- 1913 - 1914: Waranga & North Eastern Football Association
- 1919 - 1964: Goulburn Valley Football League
- 1965 - 1998: Heathcote District Football League
- 1999 - 2024: Kyabram District Football League

== Football Premierships ==
Seniors

- Goulburn Valley Football Netball League (Wednesday competition)
  - 1930 - Rushworth: d Murchison: by 3 points
  - 1931 - Rushworth: 11.16 - 82 d Mooroopna: 9.14 - 68
  - 1932 - Rushworth: 10.18 - 78 d Mooroopna: 4.11 - 35
  - 1933 - Rushworth: 11.10 - 76 d Shepparton: 10.7 - 67
  - 1935 - Rushworth: 12.9 - 81 d Shepparton: 7.8 - 50
- Tatura Football Club Knockout Carnival
  - 1937 - Rushworth: 3.7 - 25 d Goulburn Valley Football Association: 2.1 - 13
- Heathcote District Football League
  - 1965 - Rushworth: 13.14 - 92 d Mt. Pleasant: 8.4 - 52
  - 1969 - Rushworth: 12.89 - 81 d Elmore: 10.14 - 74
  - 1977 - Rushworth: 18.2 - 110 d Colbinabbin: 14.17 - 101
- Kyabram & District Football League
  - 2004 - Rushworth: d Lancaster: by 30 points

Reserves

- Heathcote District Football League
  - 1965
- Kybram & District Football League
  - 2014

Juniors

- Central Goulburn Valley Junior Football League (Saturday competition)
  - 1929 - Rushworth: 9.9 - 63 d Girgaree: 5.11 - 41

== Football Runners Ups ==
Seniors

- Goulburn Valley Football Netball League (Wednesday competition)
  - 1929 - Shepparton: 17.13 - 115 d Rushworth: 11.14 - 80
  - 1934 - Shepparton: 11.19 - 85 d Rushworth: 7.14 - 56
  - 1937 - Mooroopna: 12.14 - 86 d Rushworth: 8.10 -64
  - 1939 - Nagambie: 10.10 - 70 d Rushworth: 9.11 - 65
  - 1940 - Benalla: 15.16 - 106 d Rushworth: 11.16 - 82
- Heathcote District Football League
  - 1973 - Tooborac: 21.21 - 147 d Rushworth: 8.7 - 55
  - 1975 - Colbinabbin: 12.15 - 87 d Rushworth: 10.13 - 73
- Kyabram District Football League
  - 1999 - Nagambie: 24.5 - 149 d Rushworth: 10.6 - 66

== Football League Best & Fairest ==
Seniors

- Goulburn Valley Football League - Morrison Medal
  - 1938 - Keith Kane - 32 votes
  - 1939 - Keith Kane
  - 1948 - Gerry Sexton - 20 votes
  - 1953 - W "Bill" Cruz - 23 votes
  - 1955 - Con O'Toole
  - 1957 - Lindsay Turnball
- Heathcote District Football League - Cheatley Medal
  - 1968 - Ian McDonald
  - 1973 - Alec Horne
  - 1975 - John Lambden
  - 1993 - Jeff Turnpin
- Kyabram District Football League
  - 2002 - J.Waasdorp

== Football Club Best & Fairest ==
Seniors

- 1932 - D Arthur
- 1937 - Hec Downing
