= Undera Football Club =

Australian football club

Undera

Names
- Full name: Undera Football Netball Club
- Nickname: The Lions

Club details
- Founded: 1888
- Colours: Maroon Blue
- Competition: Kyabram DFL since 1953
- Premierships: 1891,1906, 1908, 1925, 1930, 1946, 1947, 1955, 1962, 1968, 1972, 1997, 2009.
- Ground: Undera Recreation Reserve

Other information
- Official website: http://www.underafc.sportingpulse.net

Undera Football Club is an Australian rules football club located in Undera, Victoria.

== History ==
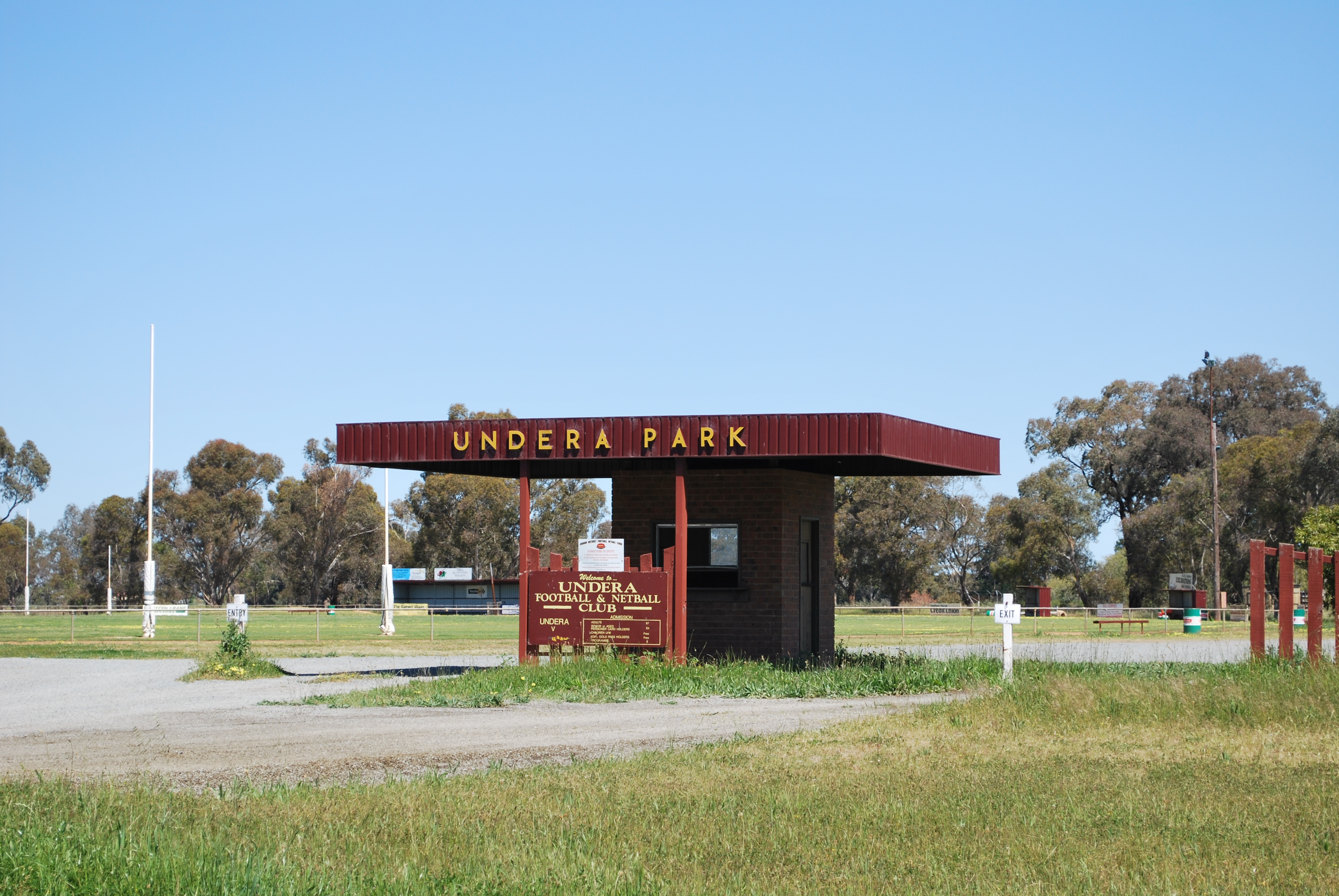
Undera_Park

The first recorded football matches for Undera Football Club were in 1888, when Undera played several matches against Kyabram.

Undera competed in the Goulburn Valley Football Association from 1890 to 1893 and defeated Mooroopna in the 1891 – Grand Final for the Elder's Hotel (Undera) Elder Medals. In one match in 1891, Undera defeated Mooroopna by Tom Crawford scoring the only goal in wet and wild weather.

Undera played in the Goulburn Valley District Football Association from 1894 to 1900.

There is very little football information available on the Undera FC between 1901 and 1909.

Under played in the East Goulburn Football Association in 1910.

Undera played in the Kyabram District Junior Football Association from 1911 to 1922.

Undera won the premiership in 1911 and were defeated by the Kyabram Imperials the 1913 Kyabram District Junior Football Association grand final.

In July 1915, the Kyabram District Junior Football Association was abandoned due to World War II.

In 1920, Undera, minor premiers, were to have played Tongala in the grand final, but floods prevented this match. Tongala apparently won this match?

In 1922, Undera lost the Kyabram District Junior Football Association to Wyuna, but Undera then won a protest for a replay, in which Wyuna won the match again, and again Undera appealed to the VFL. Finally the grand final was ordered to replayed for the third time on Saturday, 23 December 1922, in which Undera officials stated that it would not be possible.

Undera played in the Ardmona Junior Football Association from 1923 to 1925.

Undera FC won the 1925 Ardmona Junior Football Association premiership.

A senior football team was entered in the newly formed Goulburn Valley Second Eighteens Football Association in 1926 and played in this competition until 1936.

Undera played in the Goulburn Valley Football Association from 1937 to 1939.

Undera withdrew from the GVFA at their 1940 AGM and entered the Kyabram & District Football League in 1940.

Undera FC went into recess between 1941 and 1945, due to World War II.

Undera played in the Kyabram & District Football League in 1946 and 1947, winning back to back senior football premierships.

Undera played in the Central Goulburn Valley Football League Seconds competition in 1948 (minor premiers) and 1949 (minor premiers), but failed in the finals in both seasons.

Undera played in the Central Goulburn Valley Football League Senior competition between 1950 and 1952.

In early 1953, after the Central Goulburn Valley Football League folded, Undera sold all their jumpers and property and amalgamated with Mooroopna Football Club.

Undera joined the Kyabram & District Football Association in 1954.

The Undera Football Club's nickname is "The Lions".

== 2019 Executive Committee ==
- President: Corey Turvey
- Vice President: Bart Van Ruiswyk
- Secretary: Simon Delahenty
- Treasurer: Sherryn Wall
- Football Director: Glenn Campbell
- Netball Director: Simone Elder

== 2019 General Committee ==
- Julie Batey
- Jonno Holthuisen
- Jordan Jondahl
- Thomas LaPorta
- Myles Nicholl
- Jack O'Brien

== Football Premierships ==
Seniors

- Goulburn Valley Football Association
  - 1891
- ? Football Association
  - 1906
- ? Football Association
  - 1908
- Kyabram Junior Football Association
  - 1911
- Ardmona Central Junior Football Association
  - 1925
- Goulburn Valley Second Eighteens Football Association
  - 1930
- Kyabram District Football Association
  - 1946
  - 1947
  - 1955 - Undera: 6.8 - 44 d Lancaster: 5.7 - 37

|-

- Kyabram District Football League
  - 1962, 1968, 1972, 1997, 2009

Reserves

- Kyabram District Football League
  - 2009, 2013

Under 18's

- Kyabram District Football League
  - 1977, 1985

== Football League – Best & Fairest Winners ==
Seniors

- Kyabram District Football League – McNamara Medal
  - 1947: Bryan Tyndall
  - 1960: J Sellwood
  - 1962: J Neal
  - 1967: P Sleeth
  - 1973: P Sleeth
  - 1974: P Sleeth
  - 1980: C Gundrill
  - 1997: L O'Brien
