= Shepparton East Football Club =

Names
- Full name: Shepparton East Football Club
- Nickname(s): The Eagles, The Bombers (previously)

Club details
- Founded: 1924
- Colours: Blue and Yellow
- Competition: Kyabram District Football Netball League
- Coach: Dwain Vidler
- Captain: Ryan Pfieffer/ Sam Woodward
- Premierships: 18 (1926, 1944, 1945, 1948, 1958, 1959, 1960, 1961, 1975, 1980, 1985, 1994, 1995, 2001, 2006, 2010, 2012, 2016)

The Shepparton East Football Club, nicknamed the Eagles, is an Australian rules football club playing in the Kyabram District Football League. The club was formerly known as the Bombers.

The club is based in the central Victorian city of Shepparton.

== Club history ==
The Shepparton East Football Club was originally called the Settlement United Football Club and was formed in 1920 and was based at Shepparton East and originally played their games on the Central Recreation Oval.

The Settlement United FC originally played in the Shepparton District Junior Football Association in 1920 and the club's first president and "founder" was Neal Hanlon.

The Shepparton East Football Club were first admitted into the Ardmona Central Junior Football Association in 1924.

The Shepparton East Football Club won the 1926 – Goulburn Valley Second Eighteens Football Association premiership, but folded in 1927, due to a lack of playing numbers.

Shepparton East FC reformed in 1944, winning the 1944 Shepparton Sunday Football Association premiership, then moved across to the Goulburn Valley Football Association, Saturday competition in 1945, wearing the black and gold colours.

The club now known as Shepparton United Football Club was originally called City United. It was admitted to the Goulburn Valley Football League in 1950 and had grown out of the Shepparton Preserving Company Football Club (SPC) and Shepparton East Football Club, who had previously fielded separate teams in the Central Goulburn Valley Football League. Shepparton East retained their own side in the Central Goulburn Valley Football League from 1950 to 1952.

When the Central Goulburn Valley Football League folded n 1953, Shepparton East applied for admission into the GVFL Second 18 competition, but their application was rejected.

Shepparton East played in the Kyabram & District Football League from 1956 to 1961, winning four consecutive premierships between 1958 and 1961.

Shepparton East played in the Tungamah Football League between 1968 and 1995, then played in the Goulburn Valley Football League – Division 2 competition between 1996 and 1998.

Shepparton East played in the Central Goulburn Football League from 1999 to 2005.

Following the collapse of the Central Goulburn Football League in 2005, Shepparton East entered the Picola & District Football League in 2006 and won the premiership in their first season. The Eagles have played off for the last four Picola & District South East premierships, winning in 2010 and 2012.

The club was forced to changed leagues following an administration disagreement between the AFL Goulburn-Valley and the Picola & District Football League.

They spent 2018 in the Murray Football League before transferring to the Kyabram District Football Netball League for the 2019 season

== Football Premierships ==
Seniors

- Picola & District Football League
  - 2006, 2010 (undefeated), 2012, 2016 (undefeated)
- Central Goulburn Football League
  - 2001, 2004
- Tungamah Football League
  - 1980, 1985, 1994, 1995
- Kyabram & District Football League
  - 1958, 1959, 1960, 1961
- Central Goulburn Valley Football League
  - 1948 – Shepparton East: 10.12 – 72 d Shepparton: 10.7 – 67
- Goulburn Valley Football Association
  - 1945 – Shepparton East: 10.9 – 69 defeated SPC: 9.5 – 59
- Shepparton Sunday Football Association
  - 1944 – Shepparton East: 11.11 – 77 d SPC: 8.14 – 62
- Goulburn Valley Second Eighteens Football Association
  - 1926

Reserves

?

Thirds

?

Fourths

?

== Football: Runners Up ==
Seniors

- Ardmona Central Junior Football Association
  - 1925 – Undera: 5.9 – 39 d Shepparton East: 4.3 – 27
- Tungamah Football League
  - 1981 – Benalla All Blacks: 20.11 – 131 d Shepparton East: 13.12 – 90
  - 1988 – Alexandra: 15.16 – 106 d Shepparton East: 10.10 – 70

== Club Leaders ==
Seniors			Reserves		
Year	B & F Winners	Ladder	Year	B & F Winners	Ladder
Tungamah Football League					
1968					
1969					
1970					
Central Goulburn Football League					
2000					
2001		1st			
2002					
2003					
2004		1st			
2005					
Picola District Football League					
2006		1st			
2007					
2008					
2009		2nd			
2010		1st			
2011		2nd			
2012		1st			
2013		5th			
2014		4th			
2015	Jamie Spencer	3rd			
2016	Jamie Spencer	1st			
2017	Simon Russel	3rd			
Murray Football League					
2018	Mathew Rendina	10th			
Kyabram District Football League					
2019	Jeromy Aynsley	11th			
2020					
