= Goulburn Valley Football Association =

Australian rules football competition

- Sport: Australian rules football
- Founded: 1888; 138 years ago
- Folded: 1931; 95 years ago
- Motto: Pride in Battle
- No. of teams: 25
- Country: Australia
- Headquarters: Numurkah
- Most titles: Numurkah (8)

The Goulburn Valley Football Association (GVFA) was an Australian rules football competition that was first established in 1888 in the Goulburn Valley of Victoria, Australia, with the foundation clubs being Cobram, Muckatah, Nathalia, Numurkah, Wunghnu and Yarroweyah.

This football competition was separate to the Goulburn Valley District Football Association that was formed in 1893, that is still active today and now called the Goulburn Valley Football League.

== History ==
The original GVFA was a football association that catered for the smaller rural towns of the Goulburn Valley region until 1931, when it was superseded by the Murray Football League when it was first established in 1931.

There was another Goulburn Valley Football Association, in 1890 and 1891, comprising the following teams – Baldwinsville, Mooroopna, Shepparton, Tatura and Undera, with Mooroopna winning the title in 1890 and Undera defeating Mooroopna to win the 1891 – Elder's Hotel (Undera) Medals.

The 1891 draw involved the following teams - Nathalia, Numurkah, Wunghnu, Yarroweyah.

Between 1901 and 1906, Drumanure Football Club won six consecutive premierships.

In 1911, Muckatah went through the season undefeated when the Muckatah Bombers defeated Numurkah in the grand final on "the pretty tree embowered Drumanure ground" and Muckatah player, George Grant had the distinction of playing in three premiership teams in 1911, with Essendon Football Club VFA team, Tocumwal and Muckatah!

In 1911, a Goulburn Valley Junior Football Association was established with the following clubs competing – Boomanoomana, Burramine South, Cobram, Katamatite and Muckatah.

Between 1904 and 1920, the GVFA comprised enough teams to divide it into two divisions (North and South) to minimise travel for clubs to away matches, which was a big issue around 1900. At its peak the GVFA comprised 14 teams in 1906.

The GVFA went into recess from 1916 to 1918 due to World War I.

In 1932, an attempt was made to revive the GVFA, but a lack of interest from clubs meant the association permanently closed down.

== Clubs ==
=== Final ===
Club	Colours	Nickname	Home Ground	Former League	Est.	Years in GVFA	Premierships		Fate
Club	Colours	Nickname	Home Ground	Former League	Est.	Years in GVFA	Total	Years	Fate
Cobram	(1888)(1908)	Tigers	Scott Reserve, Cobram	FDFA	1887	1891-1892, 1904-1910, 1912-1914, 1919-1930	6	1907, 1909, 1913, 1914, 1928, 1929	Formed Murray FL in 1931
Nathalia			Nathalia Recreation Reserve, Nathalia	W&MRFA	1887	1888-1889, 1892, 1895-1897, 1900, 1906, 1921-1930	5	1896, 1897, 1923, 1927, 1930	Returned to Western & Moira Ridings FA in 1931
Numurkah	(1888-?)(?)	Blues	Numurkah Showgrounds, Numurkah	–	1882	1888-1930	8	1888, 1889, 1890, 1920, 1922, 1924, 1925, 1926	Formed Murray FL in 1931
Shepparton Imperials		Fuchsias	Deakin Reserve, Shepparton	GVSEFA	1926	1930	0	-	Returned to Goulburn Valley Second Eighteen FA in 1931
Strathmerton		Bulldogs	Strathmerton Recreation Reserve, Strathmerton	FDFA	1888	1903-1910, 1913-1915, 1919-1930	0	-	Formed Murray FL in 1931
Tocumwal		Bloods	Tocumwal Recreation Reserve, Tocumwal	SRFA, FDFA	1894	1905, 1907, 1909, 1912	0	-	Unaffiliated in 1906 and 1908. Moved to Southern Riverina FA in 1910 and 1913
Wunghnu	(1888-?)(?-1930)	Magpies	Wunghnu Recreation Reserve, Wunghnu	–	1888	1888-1890, 1892, 1896-1897, 1899, 1901-1911, 1913-1915, 1919-1923, 1928-1930	0	-	Merged with Drumanure to form Drumghnu in 1924, de-merged in 1928. Moved to Goulburn Valley Second Eighteen FA in 1931

=== Former ===
Club	Colours	Nickname	Home Ground	Former League	Est.	Years in GVFA	Premierships		Fate
Club	Colours	Nickname	Home Ground	Former League	Est.	Years in GVFA	Total	Years	Fate
Barooga			Barooga Recreation Reserve, Barooga	FDFA	1894	1907-1908	0	-	Entered recess in 1909; re-formed in Southern Riverina FA in 1929
Barwo				–	1906	1906	0	-	?
Boomanoomana Rovers			Barooga Recreation Reserve, Barooga	GVJFA	1911	1914, 1919-21	0	-	Folded in 1921
Bunbartha	Dark with light sash		Bunbartha Recreation Reserve, Bunbartha	–	1910	1910-11, 1919-21	0	-	Excluded from GVFA in 1922. Played in Goulburn Valley Second Eighteen FA between 1928 and 1929
Burramine/Boosey					1888	1910	0	-	Folded. Burramine later re-formed in the Benalla-Yarrawonga Line FL in 1923
Congupna			Congupna Recreation Reserve, Congupna	–	1891	1891-1892, 1897-1906	0	-	Folded in 1906
Drumanure			Katunga Recreation Reserve, Katunga	–	1896	1896-1923	7	1901, 1902, 1903, 1904, 1905, 1906, 1908	Merged with Wunghnu to form Drumghnu in 1924. Moved to Katandra District FA when Drumghnu de-merged in 1928
Drumghnu				–	1924	1924-1928	0	-	De-merged into Wunghnu and Drumanure in 1929
Kaarimba				–	1896	1896-1902	0	-	Folded
Katamatite			Katamatite Recreation Reserve, Katamatite	FDFA	1888	1906-1909, 1914, 1920-1921	0	-	Excluded from GVFA in 1922. Re-formed in Dookie FA in 1924
Katunga			Katunga Recreation Reserve, Katunga	–	1893	1893-1907, 1911-1915, 1919	4	1893, 1894, 1895, 1899	Folded in 1919. Re-formed in 1950 in Picola & District FL
Koonoomoo			Koonoomoo Recreation Reserve, Koonoomoo	–	1904	1904-1908	0	-	Folded
Muckatah		Bombers	Yarroweyah Recreation Reserve, Yarroweyah	FDFA	1888	1888, 1895, 1898-1900, 1902-1929	5	1898, 1900, 1910, 1911, 1912	Moved to Katamatite District FA in 1930
Naring Dip				–	1905	1905-1906	0	-	Folded
Shepparton		Maroons	Deakin Reserve, Shepparton	GVFL	1896	1892, 1915	1	1892	Returned to Goulburn Valley FL in 1915
Tallygaroopna		Redlegs	Tallygaroopna Recreation Reserve, Tallygaroopna	–	1894	1904-1905, 1907-1915, 1919-1929	1	1915	Moved to Goulburn Valley Second Eighteen FA in 1930
Waaia		Bombers	Waaia Recreation Reserve, Waaia	W&MRFA	1894	1896, 1898-1902, 1906-1908, 1911, 1921-1922	0	-	Returned to Western & Moira Ridings FA in 1923
Yarroweyah			Yarroweyah Recreation Reserve, Yarroweyah	–	1888	1888-1892	1	1891	Moved to Murray Border FA in 1894

== GVFA Grand Final Results ==
Year	Premiers	Score	Runners up	Score	Venue / Comments
1888	Numurkah	No G Final	Muckatah	No G Final	Numurkah only lost 1 game
1889	Numurkah	4.8 – 32	Cobram	0.3 – 3	At Cobram
1890	Numurkah	4.10 – 34	Yarroweyah	1.7 – 13	At Numurkah
1891	Yarroweyah	3.12 – 30	Congupna	1.1 – 7	At Congupna
1892	Shepparton	6.6 – 42	Congupna	3.4 – 22	At Shepparton
1893	Katunga		?		GVDFA formed
1894	Katunga		?		
1895	Katunga		Muckatah		At Nathalia
1896	Nathalia		?		
1897	Nathalia	5.8 – 38	Congupna	2.6 – 18	At Nathalia
1898	Muckatah	5.5 – 35	Congupna	1.2 – 8	At Muckatah
1899	Katunga	No G Final	Drumanure	No G Final	Katunga declared premiers
1900	Muckatah	6.6 – 42	Waaia	4.3 – 27	At Numurkah
1901	Drumanure	9.18 – 72	Numurkah	2.3 – 15	At Wunghnu
1902	Drumanure	? G Final	Muckatah	? G Final	
1903	Drumanure	6.8 – 44	Congupna	1.3 – 9	At Numurkah
1904	Drumanure	4.9 – 33	Tallygaroopna	1.7 – 13	At Numurkah
1905	Drumanure	7.10 – 52	Muckatah	7.9 – 51	At Numurkah
1906	Drumanure	4.8 – 32	Cobram	3.10 – 28	At Numurkah
1907	Cobram	5.6 – 36	Numurkah	5.5 – 35	At Numurkah
1908	Drumanure	4.5 – 29	Muckatah	2.11 – 23	At Numurkah
1909	Cobram	5.5 – 35	Muckatah	2.16 – 28	At Numurkah
1910	Muckatah	6.8 – 44	Drumanure	2.5 – 17	At Cobram
1911	Muckatah	11.15 – 81	Numurkah	5.14 – 44	At Drumanure. MFC unbeaten.
1912	Muckatah	10.13 – 73	Numurkah	7.12 – 54	At Cobram
1913	Cobram	18.21 – 129	Tallygaroopna	3.6 – 24	At Numurkah
1914	Cobram	6.8 – 44	Muckatah	3.4 – 22	At Numurkah
1915	Tallygaroopna	No G Final	Muckatah	No G Final	Season abandoned
1916					In recess WW1
1917					In recess WW1
1918					In recess WW1
1919	?				Influenza Pandemic
1920	Numurkah	5.6 – 36	Cobram	4.7 – 31	At Numurkah
1921	Muckatah	7.15 – 57	Drumanure	8.2 – 50	At Numurkah
1922	Numurkah	9.13 – 67	Nathalia	8.8 – 56	At Numurkah
1923	Nathalia	12.10 – 82	Cobram	11.13 – 79	At Nathalia
1924	Numurkah	9.14 – 68	Nathalia	9.8 – 62	At Cobram
1925	Numurkah	12.8 – 80	Muckatah	7.9 – 51	At Strathmerton
1926	Numurkah	11.12 – 78	Muckatah	8.2 – 50	At Strathmerton
1927	Nathalia	12.12 – 84	Muckatah	10.9 – 69	At Numurkah
1928	Cobram	27.16 – 162	Wunghnu	8.8 – 56	At Strathmerton
1929	Cobram	7.9 – 51	Nathalia	5.7 – 37	At Numurkah
1930	Nathalia	13.14 – 86	Shepparton Imperials	9.8 – 62	At Numurkah
Year	Premiers	Score	Runner Up	Score	Venue / Comments
