= Wunghnu Football Club =

Former Australian rules football club

Names
- Nickname: Magpies

Club details
- Founded: 1874
- Competition: Picola & District Football League

The Wunghnu Football Club, nicknamed the Magpies, was an Australian rules football club in the small Goulburn Valley town of Wunghnu, Victoria.

== History ==
It was playing in the Picola & District Football League until it was forced in 2011 into recess by the VCFL because they were deemed to be uncompetitive. The club was based in the small Victorian town of Wunghnu, which is approximately 200 km north of Melbourne.

Wunghnu ('wun u") played from 1888 to 1930 in the Goulburn Valley Football Association, a forerunner to the Murray Football League.

From 1924 to 1928, the Wunghnu and Drumanure Football Clubs merged to form the Drumanure-Wunghnu side.

Wunghnu played in some of the minor competitions around Shepparton until it joined the Picola & District Football League in 1951.

Wunghnu celebrated its first premiership in the P&DFL in 1958; a hat-trick of premierships came a few years later, in 1964, 1965 and 1966. Their last Premiership was in 1973.

Players from the club recruited to play in the VFL/AFL include Geelong Football Club 1937 premiership player Joe Sellwood.

== Football Premierships ==
Seniors

- Goulburn Valley Second Eighteens Football Association
  - 1931
- Picola & District Football League
  - 1958, 1964, 1965, 1966, 1973

Reserves

?

Thirds

?

Fourths

?
