= Tallygaroopna =

- Town
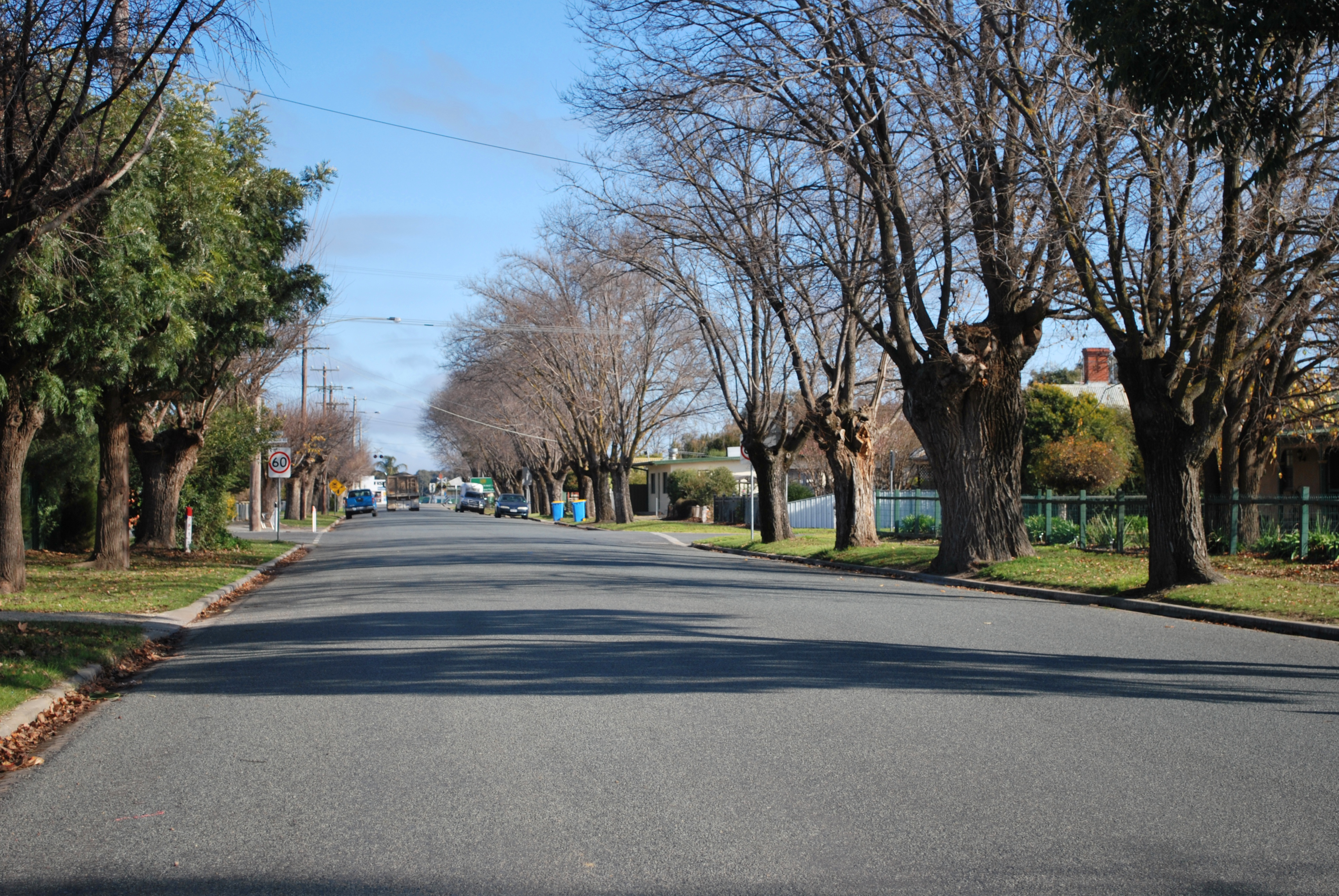
- Victoria Street, the main street of Tallygaroopna

- Coordinates: 36°15′S 145°26′E
- Country: Australia
- State: Victoria
- Region: Hume
- LGA: City of Greater Shepparton
- Location: 207 km (129 mi) N of Melbourne; 17 km (11 mi) N of Shepparton; 18 km (11 mi) S of Numurkah

Government
  - State electorate: Shepparton
  - Federal division: Nicholls

Population
  - Total: 600 (2021 census)
- Postcode: 3634

Tallygaroopna (/ˌtæliːɡəˈruːpnə/) is a town in the Goulburn Valley region of Victoria, Australia. The town is on the Goulburn Valley Highway in the City of Greater Shepparton local government area, 207 kilometres (129 mi) north of the state capital, Melbourne. At the 2021 census, Tallygaroopna had a population of 600.

== History ==
The large Tallygaroopna station was established in the 1840s by Edward Khull and two years later was sold to Sherbourne Sheppard, who later lent his name to the nearby city of Shepparton. The station was broken up for closer settlement in the 1870s, the Post Office opening on 7 December 1875. The Tallygaroopna Railway Station Post Office opened on 17 October 1881, and was later renamed as Tallygaroopna and Tallygaroopna renamed as Tallygaroopna West.

The local railway station was opened on the Goulburn Valley railway in 1881, but does not see any passenger or freight services.

Tallygaroopna Primary School is located on Victoria Street. The local kindergarten is located opposite the school. Tallygaroopna Football Club, known as the Redlegs, play in the Kyabram & District Football League. The town is also home to a bowling green and golf course.

In April 2012, the town's only pub, the Victoria Hotel, burnt to the ground.

Tallygaroopna has a history with flooding with some happening in 1919, 1939, 1956, 1974, 1993, and the most recent in 2012

== Gallery ==
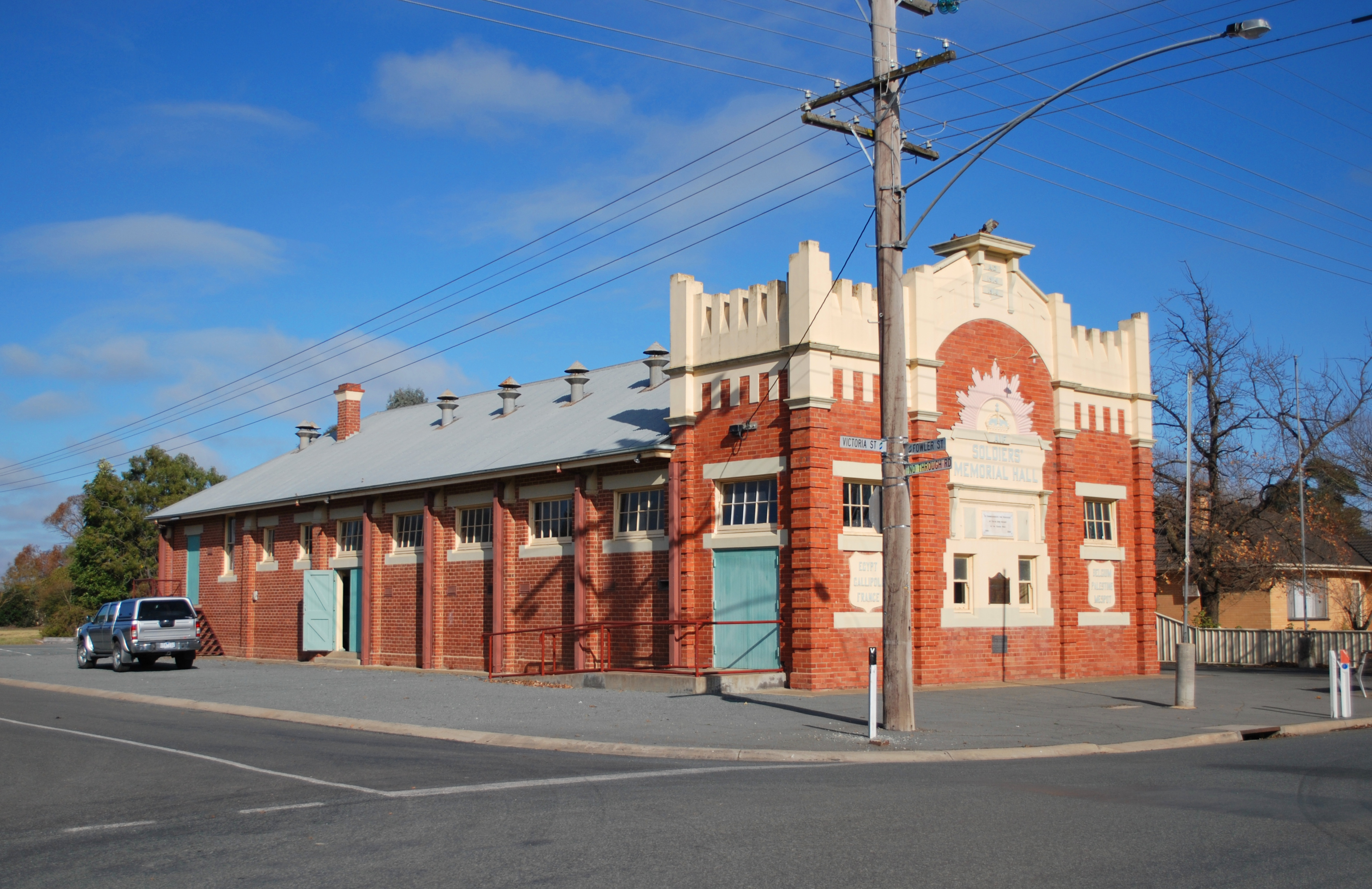
Soldiers Memorial Hall

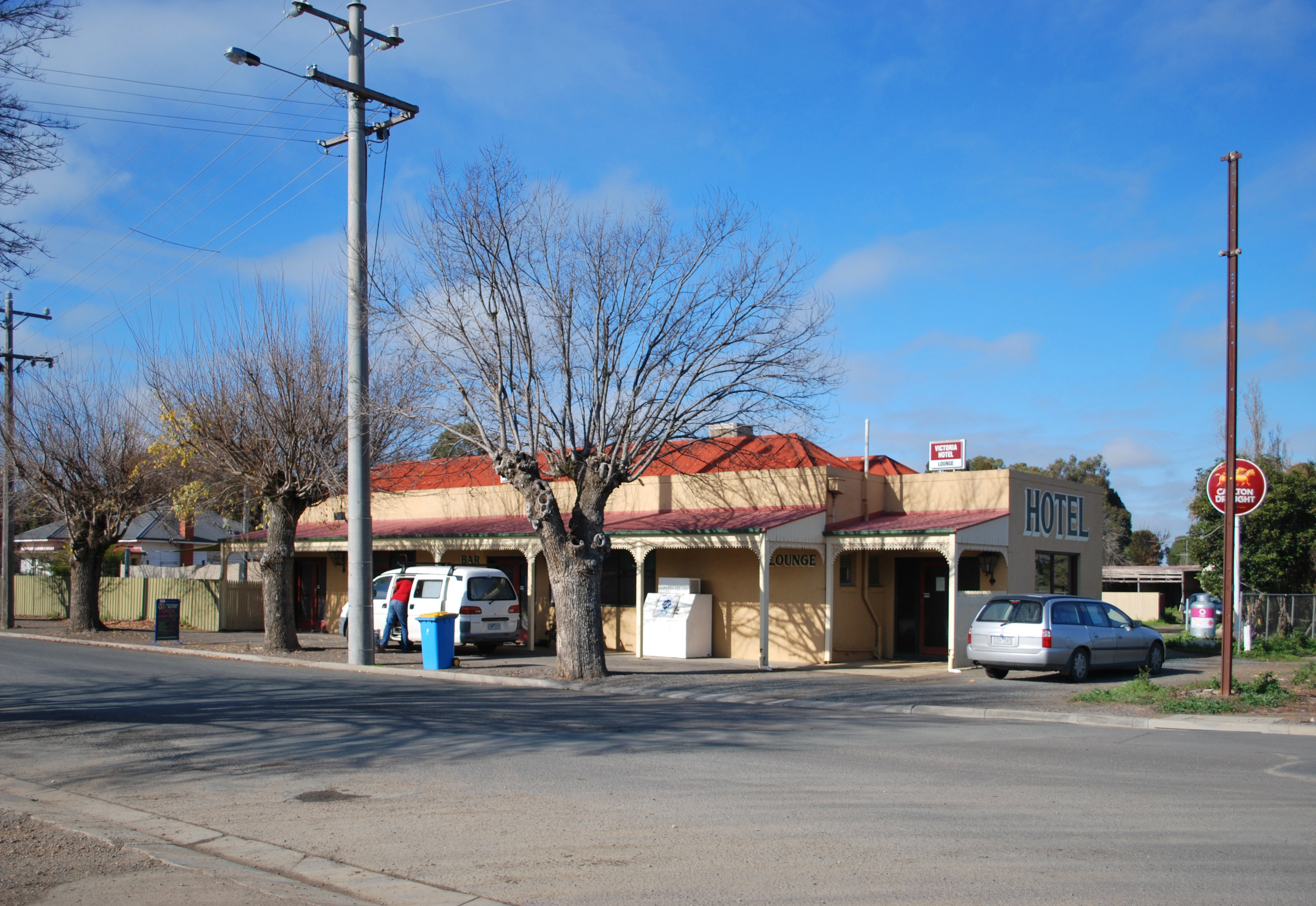
Victoria Hotel, now destroyed

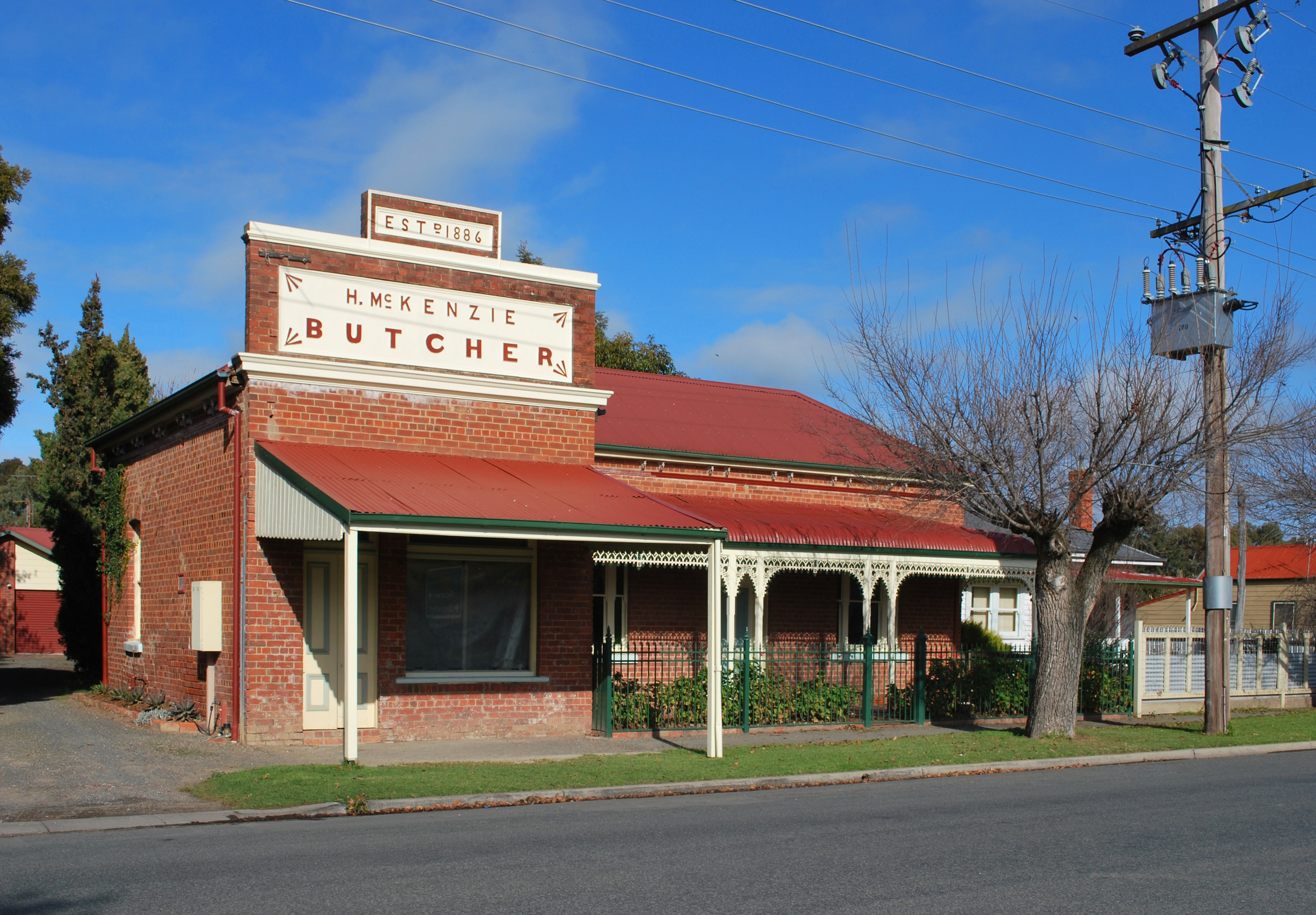
Butcher shop

== See also ==
- Tallygaroopna railway station
