= Brad L. Campbell =

Australian rules footballer (born 1975)

Brad Campbell

Personal information
- Full name: Bradley L. Campbell
- Born: 13 December 1975 (age 50)
- Original team: Tongala
- Height: 192 cm (6 ft 4 in)
- Weight: 86 kg (190 lb)

Playing career^{1}
Years	Club	Games (Goals)
1993–1994	Melbourne	1 (0)
- ^{1} Playing statistics correct to the end of 1994.

Bradley L. Campbell (born 13 December 1975) is an Australian rules footballer who played with Melbourne in the Australian Football League (AFL).

Campbell is the son of Des Campbell, who played exactly 50 games for Melbourne in the 1970s. This meant that Melbourne were able to use the father–son rule to secure him in the 1992 AFL draft. He participated in their reserves premiership winning team in 1993 but didn't play a senior game that year. The following season he made his first and only league appearance, when he played in Melbourne's 77 point win over reigning premiers Essendon at the MCG.

After leaving Melbourne, Campbell returned to the Goulburn Valley Football League, where he played for three clubs. He started at Kyabram, where he was a member of a premiership team in 1996, then went back to Tongala. Since 2004, he had played at Mooroopna. Initially an assistant coach, he was appointed senior coach for the 2008 season and also continued as a player.

He played some reserves football at Carlton in 2001, while his younger brother Blake Campbell was with the club.
