= Frank Pritchard (Australian rules footballer) =

Australian rules footballer

Personal information
- Full name: Francis James Pritchard
- Born: 6 June 1899; Tatura, Victoria
- Died: 16 December 1983 (aged 84); Burramine South, Victoria
- Original team: Tatura
- Height: 179 cm (5 ft 10 in)
- Weight: 76 kg (168 lb)

Playing career^{1}
Years	Club	Games (Goals)
1922–23	Carlton	20 (11)
- ^{1} Playing statistics correct to the end of 1923.

Francis James Pritchard (6 June 1899 – 16 December 1983) was an Australian rules footballer who played with Carlton in the Victorian Football League (VFL).

The son of William Wilson Pritchard (1864–1942) and Emily Pritchard, née Robbins (1867–1935), Francis James Pritchard was born at Tatura on 6 June 1899.

He was the father of Geelong player Bill Pritchard.
