= Paul Rowe (Australian footballer) =

Australian rules footballer

Personal information
- Full name: Paul David Rowe
- Born: 1 July 1941
- Died: 11 December 2023 (aged 82); Echuca, Victoria
- Height: 183 cm (6 ft 0 in)
- Weight: 75 kg (165 lb)

Playing career^{1}
Years	Club	Games (Goals)
1960–62	North Melbourne	15 (0)
- ^{1} Playing statistics correct to the end of 1962.

Paul David Rowe (1 July 1941 – 11 December 2023) was an Australian rules footballer who played with North Melbourne in the Victorian Football League (VFL).

Rowe played a season with Coburg in the Victorian Football Association in 1969, which came between lengthy coaching stints for Tongala in the Goulburn Valley Football League.
