= Phil Seaton =

Australian rules footballer

Personal information
- Full name: Phil Seaton
- Born: 4 January 1957 (age 69)
- Original teams: Tongala, Sandhurst
- Height: 183 cm (6 ft 0 in)
- Weight: 86 kg (190 lb)

Playing career^{1}
Years	Club	Games (Goals)
1978–80	Melbourne	19 (5)
- ^{1} Playing statistics correct to the end of 1980.

Phil Seaton (born 4 January 1957) is a former Australian rules footballer who played with Melbourne in the Victorian Football League (VFL).

Originally from Tongala, he moved to Bendigo Teacher's College in 1977 and played in Sandhurst's 1977 Bendigo Football League premiership that year before three years with Melbourne. Seaton then played with Wangaratta Rovers for several years, representing the Ovens & Murray Football League and the Victorian Country Football League in 1981 and 1982.

Seaton was runner up to Rod Coelli from Albury in the 1981 Ovens and Murray Football League Morris Medal.

Seaton returned to Tongala to play in the Goulburn Valley Football League in 1984.
