= Paul Bell (footballer) =

Australian rules footballer

Personal information
- Full name: Alfred William Paul Bell
- Born: 12 April 1914; Shepparton, Victoria
- Died: 4 July 1945 (aged 31); Balikpapan, Borneo
- Original team: Shepparton

Playing career^{1}
Years	Club	Games (Goals)
1937–38	St Kilda	15 (20)
- ^{1} Playing statistics correct to the end of 1938.

Alfred William Paul Bell (12 April 1914 – 4 July 1945) was an Australian rules footballer who played with St Kilda in the Victorian Football League. He returned to Shepparton in 1938, and coached his home team. He was killed in action in World War II.

== Family ==
The son of John Thomas Bell (1880–1943), and Ada Barbara Bell (1878–1938), née Wilson, Alfred William Paul Bell was born at Shepparton on 12 April 1914. He married Beatrice "Rannie" Alcorn (born 1915 – died ?) on 16 September 1937. They had two daughters, Beverley, and Judith.

== Education ==
He attended Shepparton High School; as did his wife.

== Football ==
Bell initially played with the Lemnos Football Club in the Goulburn Valley Second Eighteens Football Association (GVSEFA) in 1933 and then won the 1934 – GVSEFA Best & Fairest award / N. Gribble Cup. Bell then moved across to play in the stronger Goulburn Valley Football Netball League with the Shepparton Football Club in 1935.

Having tried out with Richmond two years earlier, he was cleared from Shepparton to St Kilda in June 1937. He travelled to and from Shepparton, rather than living in Melbourne, and he played 15 senior games with St Kilda over two seasons (1937 and 1938).

== Athletics ==
Bell had a sensational New Year's Day at the 1938 Shepparton Sports Carnival, winning three different races, including the 130 yards Shepparton Gift.

== Military service ==
He served in the Second AIF as a commando. He was killed in action at Balikpapan, Borneo on 4 July 1945.

== See also ==
- List of Victorian Football League players who died on active service
