= Shepparton Swans Football Club =

Shepparton Swans

Names
- Full name: Shepparton Swans Football Netball Club
- Former name(s): Lemnos; Lemnos-Shepparton
- Nickname(s): Swans

Club details
- Founded: 1928; 97 years ago
- Colours: Red White
- Competition: Goulburn Valley Football League
- President: Brent Evans, Brett Warburton
- Premierships: 4
- Ground(s): Princess Park

Uniforms
Home

Other information
- Official website: sheppartonswans.com.au

The Shepparton Swans Football Netball Club is an Australian rules football and netball club based in the city of Shepparton in northern Victoria. The club teams currently compete in the Goulburn Valley League.

== History ==
The Shepparton Swans were originally known as the "Lemnos Football Club", named after the Greek island of the same name where some local Shepparton men were posted during World War I (the local area, originally known as 'Thomas Estate No. 5', became known as that from then on) and played in black and yellow jumpers.

The club would play in the Goulburn Valley Second Eighteens Football Association from its establishment in 1928 to 1936. The association's name was changed to the Goulburn Valley Football Association (GVFA) at the 1937 AGM (winning three premierships in this time: 1937, 1938, and 1940).

When the GVFA's title was changed to the Central Goulburn Valley Football League in 1946, Lemnos applied for admission into the newly formed league, but was refused. It also found that their colours were already being used by the Shepparton East Football Club, who joined the GVFA in 1945. As a result, the club applied for and entered the Goulburn Valley Football League in 1946. Being a town-based league, the club's name was changed to Lemnos-Shepparton. Again, the black and yellow colours were already in use (this time by the Rushworth Football Club). As a result, in 1946 the club took up the use of a white jumper with a red v (similar to the VFL team of South Melbourne at the time).

The first premiership the club won in this league was in 1959, beating Kyabram by 39 points.

In the 1960s a series of improvements led to the club moving from Deakin Reserve to Princess Park in Shepparton. It wasn't until 1970 that Lemnos-Shepparton won another premiership, again beating Kyabram (this time by 35 points).

In 1999, Lemnos-Shepparton formally adopted the new names of the Shepparton Swans, staying with this permanently.

== Honours ==
=== Football Premierships ===
League	Total flags	Premiership years
Goulburn Valley Football Association	3	1937, 1938, 1940
Goulburn Valley Football League	4	1959, 1960, 1970, 2014

== Football League – Best & Fairest winners ==
Seniors

=== Goulburn Valley Second Eighteens Football Association – N Gribble Cup ===
==== Lemnos ====
- 1934 – Paul Bell

=== Goulburn Valley Football League – Morrison Medal ===
==== Lemnos ====
- W Tyquin (1949)
- R Orrman (1951, 1954, 1959)
- N Smith (1975)
- M Lambourn (1996)

==== Shepparton Swans ====
- J Sutherland (2002)
- B Durbridge (2009)

== World War II – Roll of Honour ==
The following four, former Lemnos FC players died in active duty during World War II.

- Paul Bell
- Stepper Hawkings
- George Pearce
- Ron Taylor
