= Vic Lawrence (Australian rules footballer) =

Australian rules footballer

Personal information
- Full name: Victor Thomas Lawrence
- Born: 2 January 1928; North Melbourne, Victoria
- Died: 1 April 1986 (aged 58); Ascot Vale, Victoria
- Original team: North Colts
- Height: 188 cm (6 ft 2 in)
- Weight: 86 kg (190 lb)

Playing career^{1}
Years	Club	Games (Goals)
1948–1955	North Melbourne	121 (21)
- ^{1} Playing statistics correct to the end of 1955.

Victor Thomas Lawrence (2 January 1928 – 1 April 1986) was an Australian rules footballer who played with North Melbourne in the Victorian Football League (VFL).

A key defender, Lawrence was used as both a centre half-back and fullback during his career. Lawrence was a North Melbourne player from Colts level and broke into the seniors for the first time in 1948. He was a regular member of the side from 1950 to 1955, playing 105 of a possible 109 games. In the 1950 VFL Grand Final, which North Melbourne lost to Essendon, Lawrence played as the 19th man. He represented the VFL at interstate football in 1952 and was captain of North Melbourne in 1955, his final season.

In 1956 he was cleared to Tongala, a club in the Goulburn Valley Football League, and he later played for and coached Yallourn.

Following his death in 1986, the following tribute appeared in the Latrobe Valley Express newspaper:

Football never fails to produce lively debate on the merits of individual players; however I doubt whether our club had ever seen a better high mark than Vic. My most vivid memory of Vic Lawrence was on a cold and wet wintry afternoon when he took some 30 marks against the Warragul club… I shall always remember Vic Lawrence as a remarkable player, positive coach and a modest champion.
