= Chris Woodman =

Australian rules footballer

Personal information
- Full name: Chris Woodman
- Born: 31 August 1956 (age 70)
- Original team: Shepparton United
- Height: 194 cm (6 ft 4 in)
- Weight: 87 kg (192 lb)

Playing career^{1}
Years	Club	Games (Goals)
1976–80	Melbourne	32 (31)
- ^{1} Playing statistics correct to the end of 1980.

Chris Woodman (born 31 August 1956) is a former Australian rules footballer who played with Melbourne in the Victorian Football League (VFL).
