= Doug Brown (Australian footballer) =

Australian rules footballer

Personal information
- Full name: Douglas Ernest Fewster Brown
- Born: 30 August 1923; Geelong, Victoria
- Died: 18 June 2012 (aged 88)
- Original team: Geelong District
- Height: 168 cm (5 ft 6 in)
- Weight: 73 kg (161 lb)

Playing career^{1}
| Years | Club | Games (Goals) |
| 1943 | Fitzroy | 13 (21) |
| 1944–1950 | Geelong | 70 (108) |
| Total | | 83 (129) |
- ^{1} Playing statistics correct to the end of 1950.

Career highlights
- U19s Premiership Coach 1962

Douglas Ernest Fewster Brown (30 August 1923 – 18 June 2012) was an Australian rules footballer who played with Fitzroy and Geelong in the Victorian Football League (VFL).

Brown, who kicked three goals on his league debut, was a rover from Geelong District. He couldn't play with Geelong in 1943 as they weren't competing due to the war, so he instead spent the season with Fitzroy. In 1944 Geelong returned to the league and he appeared in eight of the opening nine rounds of the season with them. He missed the rest of the year and all of the 1945 season as he was serving as a Leading Aircraftman in the Royal Australian Air Force.

He proved a useful forward when resting in the forward pockets and contributed a career best 26 goals in 1947, from 15 games. His final appearance for Geelong was in their 17-point preliminary final loss to North Melbourne in 1950.

Having received a good offer from Tatura, Brown joined the Goulburn Valley Football League club as captain-coach in 1951. Brown was the league's leading goal-kicker that year with 86 goals. He would then lead Tatura to runners up in 1951 and then back to back premierships in 1952 and 1953.
