= William Pritchard =

William Pritchard may refer to:

- William Pritchard (American football) (1901–1978), American football player and coach
- William Arthur Pritchard (1888–1981), Canadian Marxist labour activist
- William H. Pritchard (born 1932), American literary critic
- William Thomas Pritchard (1829–1907), British consul and adventurer
- Bill Pritchard (footballer) (1927–2011), Australian rules footballer

== See also ==
- Bill Pritchard, British singer-songwriter
