= Clyde Hill =

Clyde Hill may refer to:

- Clyde Hill, Washington
- Clyde Hill (footballer) (1895–1965), Australian rules footballer
