= Jack Greenwood (footballer) =

Australian rules footballer

Personal information
- Full name: John Greenwood
- Born: 26 December 1943 (age 82)
- Height: 185 cm (6 ft 1 in)
- Weight: 80 kg (176 lb)

Playing career^{1}
Years	Club	Games (Goals)
1963–1964	Footscray	23 (0)
1967–1968	South Melbourne	22 (0)
Total		45 (0)
- ^{1} Playing statistics correct to the end of 1968.

John "Jack" Greenwood (born 26 December 1943) is a former Australian rules footballer who played with Footscray and South Melbourne in the Victorian Football League (VFL).

Greenwood, a defender, had two stints in the VFL. He played at Footscray in 1963 and 1964, then spent some time with Daylesford.

In the 1967 VFL season he began playing for South Melbourne and appeared in all 18 games that year. He had knee surgery in 1968 and couldn't break into the team until round 17.

Greenwood transferred to Goulburn Valley Football League club Tatura in 1969 as playing coach and won back to back Morrison Medals in his first two seasons.
