= Bruce Ferrari =

Australian rules footballer

Personal information
- Full name: Bruce Leonard Ferrari
- Born: 13 July 1936
- Original team: Shepparton United
- Height: 180 cm (5 ft 11 in)
- Weight: 74 kg (163 lb)
- Position: Half forward / Centre

Playing career^{1}
Years	Club	Games (Goals)
1955–60	Geelong	58 (42)
- ^{1} Playing statistics correct to the end of 1960.

Bruce Ferrari (born 13 July 1936) is a former Australian rules footballer who played with Geelong in the Victorian Football League (VFL).
