= Justin Davies (footballer) =

Australian rules footballer (born 1983)

Personal information
- Born: 7 July 1983 (age 43)
- Original team: Shepparton United / Murray U18
- Debut: Round 7, 10 May 2002, Carlton vs. Essendon, at M.C.G.
- Height: 184 cm (6 ft 0 in)
- Weight: 80 kg (176 lb)

Playing career^{1}
Years	Club	Games (Goals)
2002–2005	Carlton	41 (20)
- ^{1} Playing statistics correct to the end of 2005.

Career highlights
- Carlton pre-season premiership side, 2005

Justin Davies (born 7 July 1983) is a former Australian rules footballer who played in the Australian Football League (AFL).

He was recruited as the number 39 draft pick in the 2001 AFL draft from Shepparton United. He made his AFL debut for the Carlton Football Club in Round 7, 2002 against Essendon.

Predominantly playing as a small forward, Davies spent a lot of time playing for Carlton's VFL-affiliate, the Northern Bullants. A back injury sidelined Justin for the entire 2006 season, and he was delisted at season's end.

In 2007, Davies returned to his former junior club, Shepparton United, in the Goulburn Valley Football League. From 2008 until 2013, he played for Swan Hill in the Central Murray Football League, and he won premierships with the club in 2008 and 2011. He returned to Shepparton United in 2014.
