= Bob Dawson (footballer) =

Australian rules footballer (1921–2023)

Personal information
- Full name: Robert James Dawson
- Born: 3 January 1921; Elmore, Victoria, Australia
- Died: 31 July 2023 (aged 102)
- Original team: Elmore
- Height: 169 cm (5 ft 7 in)
- Weight: 67 kg (148 lb)

Playing career^{1}
Years	Club	Games (Goals)
1941	St Kilda	4 (0)
- ^{1} Playing statistics correct to the end of 1941.

Robert James Dawson (3 January 1921 – 31 July 2023) was an Australian rules footballer who played with St Kilda F.C. in the Victorian Football League (VFL).

== Biography ==
Dawson came from Elmore and spent just one year at St Kilda, playing four games in the 1941 VFL season. The following year, he enlisted in the Australian Army and served overseas during the war.

He had considerable success in country football, with best and fairest awards in three different Victorian leagues.

In 1946, the same year he returned from the war, he played for Elmore in the Bendigo Football League and won the Michelsen Medal.

He then coached Tongala in the Goulburn Valley Football League, where he was awarded a Morrison Medal in 1950.

Dawson coached Tongala Football Club Thirds for 18 years and the Goulburn Valley Football League Thirds premiership trophy is called the Dawson Cup.

He turned 100 in 2021. Dawson died on 31 July 2023, at the age of 102.
