= Ronald Simpson =

Ronald Simpson may refer to:

- Ronald Simpson (actor) (1896–1957), British actor
- Ronnie Simpson (1930–2004), Scottish football goalkeeper
- Ron Simpson (English footballer) (1934–2010), English footballer
- Ron Simpson (Australian footballer) (1926–2016), Australian rules footballer
- Ron Simpson (basketball), American basketball player
- R. A. Simpson (Ronald Albert Simpson 1929–2002), Australian poet
- Ronny Jordan (1962–2014), real name Ronald Simpson, guitarist

== See also ==
- Ronald Simson (1880–1914), Scottish rugby union player
