= Bill Fischer (Australian footballer) =

Australian rules footballer

Personal information
- Full name: William Nicholson Fischer
- Born: 3 October 1883; Kilmore, Victoria
- Died: 15 October 1917 (aged 34); Passchendaele salient, Belgium
- Original team: Tatura

Playing career^{1}
Years	Club	Games (Goals)
1909	Melbourne	1 (0)
- ^{1} Playing statistics correct to the end of 1909.

William Nicholson Fischer (3 October 1883 – 15 October 1917) was an Australian rules footballer who played with Melbourne in the Victorian Football League (VFL). He was killed in action in Belgium in World War I.

== Family ==
One of the six children of Henry and Isabelle Fischer, née Mathieson, he was born at Kilmore, Victoria on 3 Oct 1883. He attended Kilmore State School.

== Football ==
Recruited from Tatura, he played his first and only senior game for Melbourne against Carlton, at the MCG on 29 May 1909 (round nine). It was a close match until three-quarter time, when Carlton drew away to win by 23 points, 12.8 (80) to 8.9 (57).

== Soldier ==
His brother, also an excellent footballer, Henry Mathieson Fischer (1880–1960), had served in the Boer War, and became a policeman, retiring as the officer in charge of the police station at Hawthorn, Victoria.

Bill Fischer enlisted in the First AIF on 13 December 1915, giving his occupation as draper—he had been working in Kyabram prior to his enlistment—and his status as single. He was promoted to sergeant on 9 July 1917.

== Death ==
He was killed in action, serving with the 8th Brigade Australian Field Artillery, during the Battle of Passchendaele on 15 October 1917, and is buried at the Potijze Chateau Grounds Cemetery, Belgium. His name is located at panel 15 in the Commemorative Area at the Australian War Memorial.

== See also ==
- List of Victorian Football League players who died on active service
