= Bill Heaphy =

Australian rules footballer

Personal information
- Full name: William Loch Heaphy
- Born: 18 December 1888; Brunswick, Victoria
- Died: 21 May 1914 (aged 25); Kyabram, Victoria
- Original team: Tatura
- Height: 177 cm (5 ft 10 in)
- Weight: 75 kg (165 lb)

Playing career^{1}
Years	Club	Games (Goals)
1908–1909	Essendon	5 (3)
- ^{1} Playing statistics correct to the end of 1909.

William Loch Heaphy (18 December 1888 – 21 May 1914) was an Australian rules footballer who played with Essendon in the Victorian Football League (VFL). He was from Tatura originally and went to Geelong College, but came to Essendon via West Melbourne, during the 1908 VFL season.

== Essendon ==
Heaphy made his league debut in Essendon's round 18 win over Geelong at East Melbourne.

His second appearance for Essendon was in the 1908 VFL Grand Final. He was the youngest player on the field, at 19 years of age, but not the least experienced, as teammate Harry Prout was making his debut. Essendon lost by nine points, with Heaphy playing in a forward pocket.

He played three games with Essendon in the 1909 season, then transferred to Brunswick mid season and finished the year with another grand final appearance, this time finishing on the winning side.

== Poor health and death ==
Heaphy had serious issues with his heart and in 1914 spent some time in a Melbourne private hospital. Back at Kyabram on 21 May 1914, Heaphy suffered a fatal seizure, having earlier taken what he thought was his heart medication. It was ruled by a coroner that he had been poisoned and gave a verdict of accidental death.
