= Tongala Football Club =

Tongala FNC

Names
- Full name: Tongala Football & Netball Club Inc.
- Nickname(s): Blues

2024 season

Club details
- Founded: 1894; 131 years ago
- Colours
- Competition: Murray Football League
- Owners: Tongala FNC Members
- President: Daren Maloney
- CEO: Sherre Marsh
- Coach: Jordan Souter
- Premierships: 1920, 1923, 1937, 1939, 1940, 1945, 1949, 1961, 1983, 1984
- Ground(s): Tongala Recreation Reserve (capacity: 5,000)

Other information
- Official website: Tongala FNC website

The Tongala Football Club, nicknamed the Blues, is an Australian rules football club playing in the Murray Football League.

The club is based in the town of Tongala located in the north of Victoria.

== History ==
The Tongala Football Club was formed in 1894 in a meeting at Mangan's Victoria Hotel, Tongala, with games played at Tongala Recreation Reserve. Tongala initially wore a red jumper with black horizontal bars in 1894.

In 1919, Tongala's application for admission into the Goulburn Valley Football League was rejected on the grounds that Tongala was not a strong enough team.

In 1937, the club's colours were yellow and black.

The club has participated in a number of local football leagues over the years with great success.

== Football competitions timeline ==
Tongala FC have competed in the following football competitions –

- 1910 to 1914: Kyabram District Junior Football Association
- 1915: Kyabram District Football Association
- 1916 to 1918: Club in recess, due to World War I
- 1919 to 1923: Kyabram District Junior Football Association
- 1924 to 1932: Goulburn Valley Football League
- 1933 to 1935: Echuca and District Football League
- 1936 to 1940: Kyabram District Football Association
- 1941 to 1944: Club in recess, due to World War II
- 1945 to 1946: Kyabram District Football Association
- 1946 to 2005: Goulburn Valley Football League
- 2006 to present day: Murray Football League

== Football Premierships ==
Seniors

- Murray Football League
  - Nil
- Goulburn Valley Football League
  - 1949 - Tongala: 10.17 - 77 d Kyabram: 6.13 - 49
  - 1961 - Tongala: 11.12 - 78 d Shepparton: 9.11 - 65
  - 1983 - Tongala: d
  - 1984 - Tongala: d
- Kyabram District Football League
  - 1937 - Tongala: 13.14 - 92 d Lancaster: 9.12 - 66
  - 1939 - Tongala: 15.8 - 98 d Stanhope: 13.12 - 90
  - 1940 - Tongala: 9.11 - 65 d Stanhope: 4.8 - 32
  - 1945 - Tongala: 18.17 - 125 d Stanhope: 11.9 - 75
- Kyabram District Junior Football Association
  - 1920 - Tongala: 3.3 - 21 d Undera: 2.2 - 14
  - 1923 - Tongala: 5.5 - 35 d Imperials: 3.7 - 25

== VFL / AFL Players ==
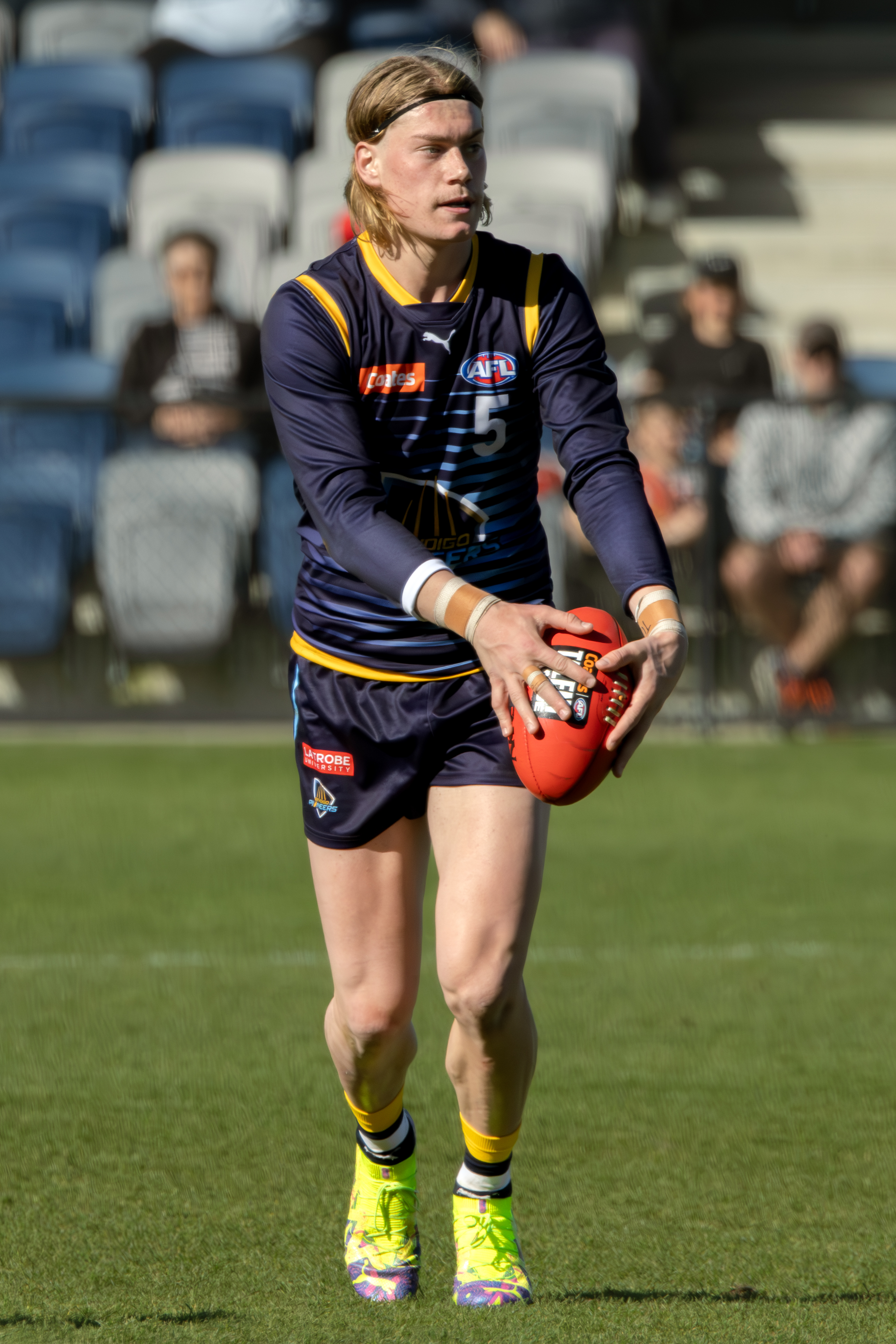
Harley Reid

The following footballers played with Tongala, prior to playing senior football in the VFL/AFL or coached Tongala and / or drafted, with the year indicating their VFL/AFL debut.

- 1932 - Sir Douglas Nicholls: Fitzroy
- 1937 - Arch Shields: Carlton
- 1941 - Bob Dawson: St. Kilda
- 1948 - Vic Lawrence: North Melbourne
- 1949 - Ron Simpson: Fitzroy
- 1960 - Paul Rowe - North Melbourne
- 1963 - Ian Graham: Collingwood
- 1978 - Phil Seaton: Melbourne
- 1991 - Sam Pang: Collingwood Under 19's
- 1992 - Brendan Parker: Carlton
- 1993 - Brad L. Campbell: Melbourne
- 2001 - Blake Campbell: Carlton
- 2024 - Harley Reid: West Coast Eagles
