= Bill Pritchard (footballer) =

Australian rules footballer

Personal information
- Full name: William John Pritchard
- Born: 29 January 1927; Tatura, Victoria
- Died: 2 November 2011 (aged 84); Wangaratta, Victoria
- Original team: Tatura
- Height: 183 cm (6 ft 0 in)
- Weight: 81 kg (179 lb)

Playing career^{1}
Years	Club	Games (Goals)
1948–51	Geelong	21 (0)
- ^{1} Playing statistics correct to the end of 1951.

William John Pritchard (29 January 1927 – 2 November 2011) was an Australian rules footballer who played with Geelong in the Victorian Football League (VFL).

The son of Carlton footballer Francis James Pritchard (1899–1983) and Elizabeth Marion Frances Pritchard, nee Forsyth (1902–1969), William John Pritchard was born at Tatura on 29 January 1927.

Pritchard won the 1947 Goulburn Valley Football League best and fairest award, the Morrison Medal.
