= Ray Willett =

Australian rules footballer

Personal information
- Full name: Ray Willett
- Born: 22 August 1941 (age 85)
- Original team: Greensborough/NHS
- Height: 189 cm (6 ft 2 in)
- Weight: 85 kg (187 lb)

Playing career^{1}
Years	Club	Games (Goals)
1960–1961, 1964	Collingwood	20 (17)
- ^{1} Playing statistics correct to the end of 1964.

Ray Willett (born 22 August 1941) is a former Australian rules footballer who played with Collingwood in the Victorian Football League (VFL) during the 1960s.

Willett, recruited from Greensborough and Northcote High School, played in Collingwood's 1960 finals series despite playing only three home and away games. He kicked two goals in their preliminary final win and in just his sixth league game played as a full-forward in the 1960 VFL Grand Final. Collingwood would lose the grand final and it was the first time Willett has finished on a losing side. A ruckman, he played a further eight games in 1961 but then had to move to the country Victorian town of Strathallan due to his teaching career.

He played for Rochester in 1962 and won the Michelsen Medal, given to each season's "Best and Fairest" in the Bendigo Football League. Willett, who was also a premiership player with Rochester, returned to Collingwood briefly in 1964. In his first game back he kicked six goals, against Fitzroy, but played just five more games.

For the remainder of the 1960s, he was playing coach with Mooroopna in the Goulburn Valley Football League (GVFL). He won three Morrison Medals in four years, taking home the league "Best and Fairest" award in 1965, 1967 and 1968 and was inducted into the GVFL - Hall of Fame in 2014.

Willett, later played for Corowa Football Club and was runner up in the 1972 Ovens & Murray Football League Morris Medal to Myrtleford's Bruce Waite by one vote. He also won Corowa's 1972 club best and fairest award.
