= Beau Muston =

Australian rules footballer (born 1987)

Personal information
- Born: 1 March 1987 (age 39)
- Original team: Shepparton United/Murray Bushrangers
- Draft: No. 22, 2005 national draft
- Debut: Round 9, 2009, Hawthorn vs. Melbourne, at Melbourne Cricket Ground
- Height: 189 cm (6 ft 2 in)
- Weight: 83 kg (183 lb)

Playing career^{1}
Years	Club	Games (Goals)
2006–2010	Hawthorn	13 (8)
- ^{1} Playing statistics correct to the end of 2010.

Beau Muston (born 1 March 1987) is a former Australian rules football player who played with the Hawthorn Football Club in the Australian Football League.

Muston is an inside midfielder who during the TAC Cup in 2005, averaged 23 disposals and nine contested possessions which included six hardball-gets. Muston suffered the first of three serious knee injuries in 2005. Muston was drafted by the Hawks with pick 22 in the 2005 AFL draft, despite coming off a knee reconstruction and needed further surgery after an examination showed the graft and screws had loosened. This meant he could not play at all in 2006.

In 2007, Muston played with the Box Hill Hawks, the Victorian Football League team associated with Hawthorn. Muston was expected to make his debut at senior level in 2008 but during a pre-season match against Adelaide on 1 March 2008, Muston fell to the ground while going for a tackle and limped off after he suffered another setback to his knee by tearing the reconstructed ACL, and was on the sidelines for the rest of the 2008 season.

After three ACL reconstructions to his knee, Muston made an excellent debut with the Hawks on 24 May 2009 against Melbourne at the MCG, racking up 31 disposals (24 kicks, 7 handballs), a goal.

Muston played five games in a row before getting dropped after a poor game against West Coast Eagles. He returned to the side in round 20 and was one of the better players in the round 22 loss to Essendon. He finished the season with 146 disposals from eight games. Hawthorn fans were impressed with Muston's debut because of his remarkable kicking accuracy. Muston is now the captain of the Box Hill Hawks

Muston was de-listed by Hawthorn at the end of the 2010 football season.

== Statistics ==
Legend
G	Goals	K	Kicks	D	Disposals	T	Tackles
B	Behinds	H	Handballs	M	Marks

Season	Team	No.	Games	Totals							Averages (per game)							Votes
Season	Team	No.	Games	G	B	K	H	D	M	T	G	B	K	H	D	M	T	Votes
2006	Hawthorn	39	0	—	—	—	—	—	—	—	—	—	—	—	—	—	—	0
2007	Hawthorn	17	0	—	—	—	—	—	—	—	—	—	—	—	—	—	—	0
2008	Hawthorn	17	0	—	—	—	—	—	—	—	—	—	—	—	—	—	—	0
2009	Hawthorn	17	8	2	3	80	66	146	39	20	0.3	0.4	10.0	8.3	18.3	4.9	2.5	0
2010	Hawthorn	17	5	6	2	23	25	48	9	9	1.2	0.4	4.6	5.0	9.6	1.8	1.8	0
Career			13	8	5	103	91	194	48	29	0.6	0.4	7.9	7.0	14.9	3.7	2.2	0
