= Barry Connolly =

Australian rules footballer, coach, and executive

Personal information
- Full name: Barry Connolly
- Born: 30 August 1938
- Died: 6 May 2011 (aged 72)
- Original team: Benalla
- Height: 173 cm (5 ft 8 in)
- Weight: 79 kg (174 lb)

Playing career^{1}
| Years | Club | Games (Goals) |
| 1958 | Footscray | 13 (20) |
- ^{1} Playing statistics correct to the end of 1958.

Barry Connolly (30 August 1938 – 6 May 2011) was an Australian rules footballer who played with Footscray in the Victorian Football League (VFL).

Recruited from Benalla, where he initially played in the Benalla Junior Football League with the Rockets, who won the 1953 BJFL premiership. Connolly won the BJFL goal kicking with 48 goals in 1953, then played with Benalla in 1954, and making his senior O&MFL debut in June 1954, then coming second in the 1954 Reserves best and fairest award to John Connolly. Connolly polled seven votes in the 1954 O&MFL Reserves best and fairest award, the Marks Medal to finish equal third. Connolly then played in Benalla's 1955 O&MFL Reserves premiership team, as a 17 year old, prior to being a regular Ovens & Murray Football League senior player in 1956 and 1957.

A centreman, Connolly impressed the Bulldogs during the 1958 pre-season and spent the 1958 VFL season at Footscray and kicked three goals against Richmond on his debut. At the end of the year he returned to the country and went on to have a long career as a player, coach and administrator.

In 1965, he was seriously injured while working at a tin mine when a barrel of sulphuric acid exploded. He was burnt extensively and spent six weeks recovering in hospital. He was coach of the Ardlethan Football Club during this time.

Connolly coached Goulburn Valley Football League club Shepparton United in 1983 and 1984, then served as the league's president from 1985 to 2002.

== Family ==
He and his wife Monica had four children, including former Fremantle coach Chris Connolly.
