= Sid Patterson =

Australian racing cyclist (1927–1999)

Sydney Patterson
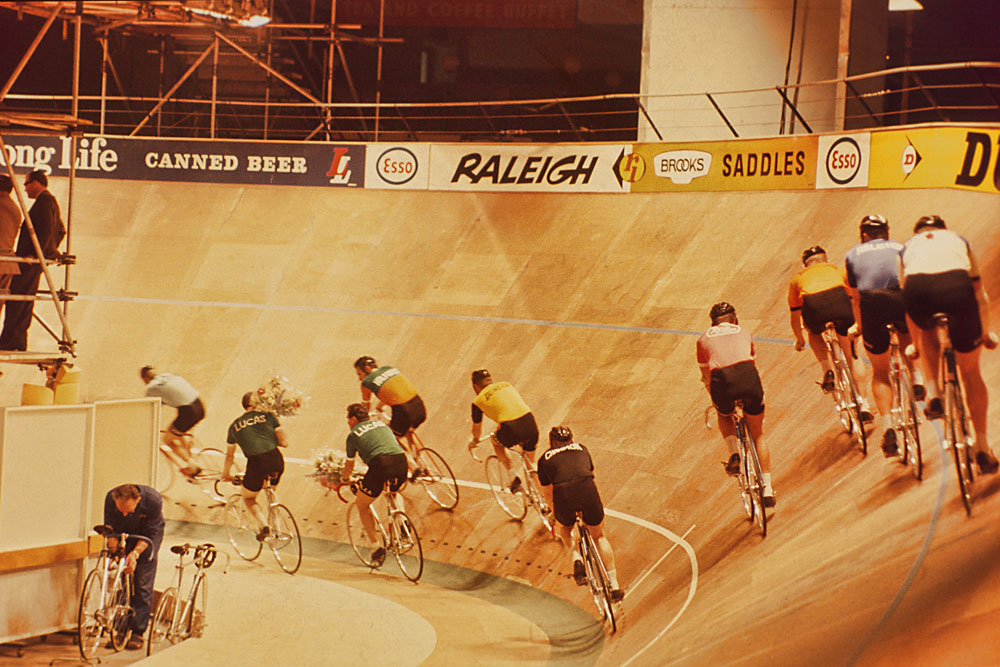

Personal information
- Full name: Sydney Patterson
- Nickname: Sid Patterson
- Born: 14 August 1927 Melbourne, Australia
- Died: 29 November 1999 (aged 72)

Cycling career
- Sport: Cycling
- Discipline: Track
- Role: Rider

Sydney Philip Patterson (also known as Sid Patterson, 14 August 1927 – 29 November 1999) was a world champion amateur and professional track cyclist from Melbourne, Victoria, Australia. While a teenager, Patterson won every Victorian and Australian title between 1,000 metres and ten miles (16 km). He represented Australia in cycling at the 1948 Summer Olympics in London.

In 1949 he won every Australian track championship in the sprint, time trial, 1 mile, and 5 miles (8.0 km) events. Later that year he won the world amateur sprint championship in Copenhagen, and in 1950, the world amateur pursuit championship in Liège. At the 1950 British Empire Games he won silver medals for the 1000m sprint and 1000m time trial.

In 1951 he won the Manchester Wheelers' Club Muratti Cup beating the British Sprint Champion, Alan Bannister, by almost a length. However, Patterson was alleged to have held Bannister during the final sprint for the line and was subsequently disqualified and the race was awarded to Bannister.

In 1951 Patterson became a professional and won the world professional pursuit championship in 1952 in Paris, and in 1953 in Zurich. Patterson teamed with Russell Mockridge and Reginald Arnold to win the Paris six-day race in 1955. By his final year of racing in 1967 he had 12 consecutive Australian championships.

Over the years, Patterson won three Shepparton Wheelrace events at the annual New Year's Day, Shepparton Sports Carnival in 1952, 1954 and 1956, plus a number of other races in Shepparton too.

Sid Patterson was sponsored by Malvern Star, founded by Sir Bruce Small.

At 72 Patterson died of liver cancer. The Sid Patterson Grand Prix is held in Melbourne annually in his honour. The first was won by Tommy Nankervis, who was introduced to the sport after meeting Patterson at a bike shop. In 2015, he was an inaugural Cycling Australia Hall of Fame inductee.
