= Roy Dick =

Australian rules footballer, born 1900

Personal information
- Full name: Albert Roy Dick
- Born: 28 October 1900; Tatura, Victoria
- Died: 27 June 1971 (aged 70); Tatura, Victoria
- Original team: Tatura

Playing career^{1}
| Years | Club | Games (Goals) |
| 1923 | Carlton | 1 (0) |
- ^{1} Playing statistics correct to the end of 1923.

Albert Roy Dick (28 October 1900 – 27 June 1971) was an Australian rules footballer who played with Carlton in the Victorian Football League (VFL).
