= Wally Beckwith =

Australian rules footballer (1893–1983)

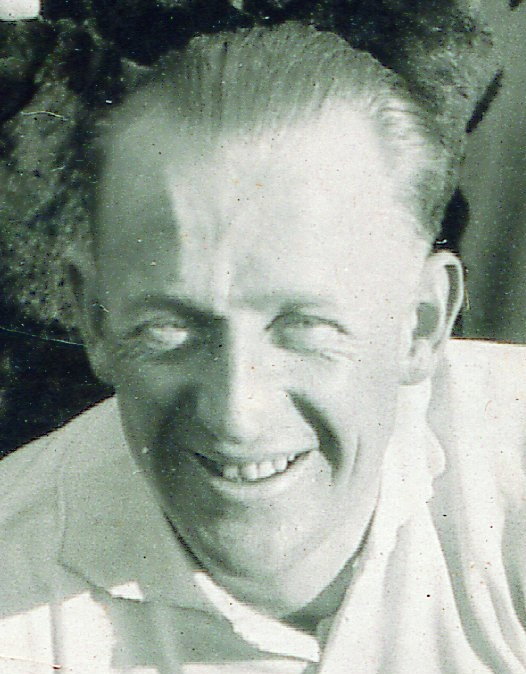

Personal information
- Full name: John Walter Beckwith
- Born: 30 May 1893; Wonwondah East, Victoria
- Died: 7 December 1983 (aged 90); Mentone, Victoria
- Original team: Clifton Hill

Playing career^{1}
| Years | Club | Games (Goals) | |
| 1918 | Fitzroy | 1 (0) | |

Umpiring career
| Years | League | Role | Games |
| 1928–1929 | VFL | Boundary | 22 |
- ^{1} Playing statistics correct to the end of 1918.

John Walter 'Wally' Beckwith (30 May 1893 – 7 December 1983) was a professional runner and Australian rules footballer who played for Fitzroy and was a boundary umpire in the Victorian Football League (VFL).

== Athletic career ==
Beckwith was a professional sprinter who competed under the Victorian Athletic League (VAL) from 1909–1934. As both a flat-runner and a hurdler he was most successful during his early years which included a third-place in the 1915 Stawell Gift and a win in the Sprint Handicap (75 yards) at the same meeting. He had won the latter event in 1913 and could have won three in a row had he not submitted an incomplete entry for in 1914. Other wins of note included the 1918 Shepparton Gift and a Wangaratta Gift. He was winning races as late as 1930 when he won the Lancefield Gift.

In 1938 Beckwith was appointed one of the handicappers for the Stawell meeting and later that same year was appointed as a handicapper for the VAL. Having filled further roles as VAL steward and committee member he was elected president in 1947 and served until 1950. He became an honorary life member of the VAL in 1951 and of the Stawell Athletic Club in 1962.

== Football career ==
Beckwith played his early football at Clifton Hill and West Melbourne CYMS in the CYMS Football Association. He made his only league appearance in the second round of the 1918 VFL season, when he played in Fitzroy's 40-point loss to eventual premiers South Melbourne at Brunswick Street Oval.

His son John had a much more successful career, playing in five premiership teams at Melbourne.

== Umpiring career ==
A knee injury forced Beckwith to retire from playing and he concentrated on athletics for most of the 1920s. It was common for professional athletes to use boundary umpiring as a way of maintaining fitness and Beckwith applied to the VFL in 1928. He was accepted and placed on the list of boundary umpires for that season.

He made his debut in the first round officiating at the Richmond versus North Melbourne match earning Heritage Number 152. In two seasons Beckwith officiated in 22 VFL and 4 country matches. His last match was the 1929 Grand Final.
