= Arch Shields =

Australian rules footballer, born 1914

Personal information
- Full name: Archibald John Shields
- Born: 28 May 1914; Kyabram, Victoria
- Died: 25 August 1995 (aged 81); Spring Hill, Queensland
- Original team: Tongala
- Height: 183 cm (6 ft 0 in)
- Weight: 76 kg (168 lb)

Playing career^{1}
Years	Club	Games (Goals)
1937–1938	Carlton	19 (19)
- ^{1} Playing statistics correct to the end of 1938.

Archibald John Shields MBE (28 May 1914 – 25 August 1995) was an Australian rules footballer who played for the Carlton Football Club in the Victorian Football League (VFL).
