= Deakin Reserve =

Cricket ground in Victoria, Australia

- formerly the Shepparton Recreation Reserve
- Interactive map of Deakin Reserve

Ground information
- Location: 20 Harold St, Shepparton, Australia
- Country: Australia
- Coordinates: 36°22′37.22″S 145°24′28.57″E
- Establishment: 1875
- Capacity: 2,000 seated, overall 15,000
- End names
- Nixon St end Grandstand end

Team information
Shepparton FNC	(1879)
Shepparton United FNC	(1950)
Murray Bushrangers U/18 FC	(1993)
Central Park St. Brendan's CC	(1981)
Shepparton Sports Carnival	(1906-70)

Deakin Reserve is the main sports venue in the Goulburn Valley and is primarily a cricket and Australian Rules Football sports oval in Shepparton, Victoria, Australia.

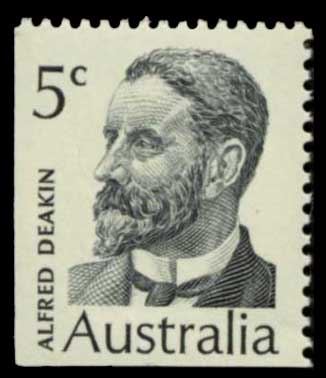
1969: Alfred Deakin Stamp

== History ==
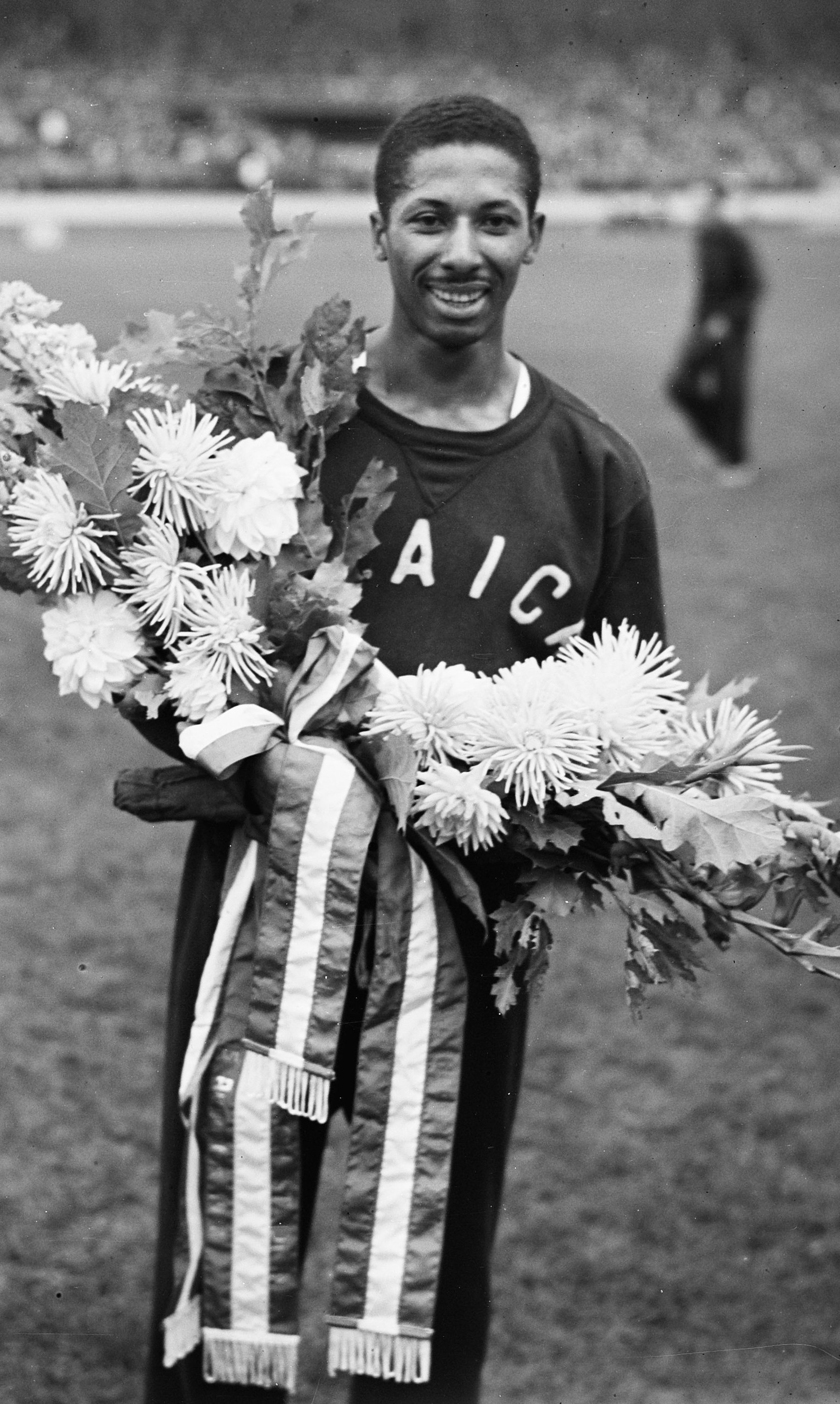
Jamaican Olympic gold medal runner, Herb McKenley, ran in the 1954 carnival

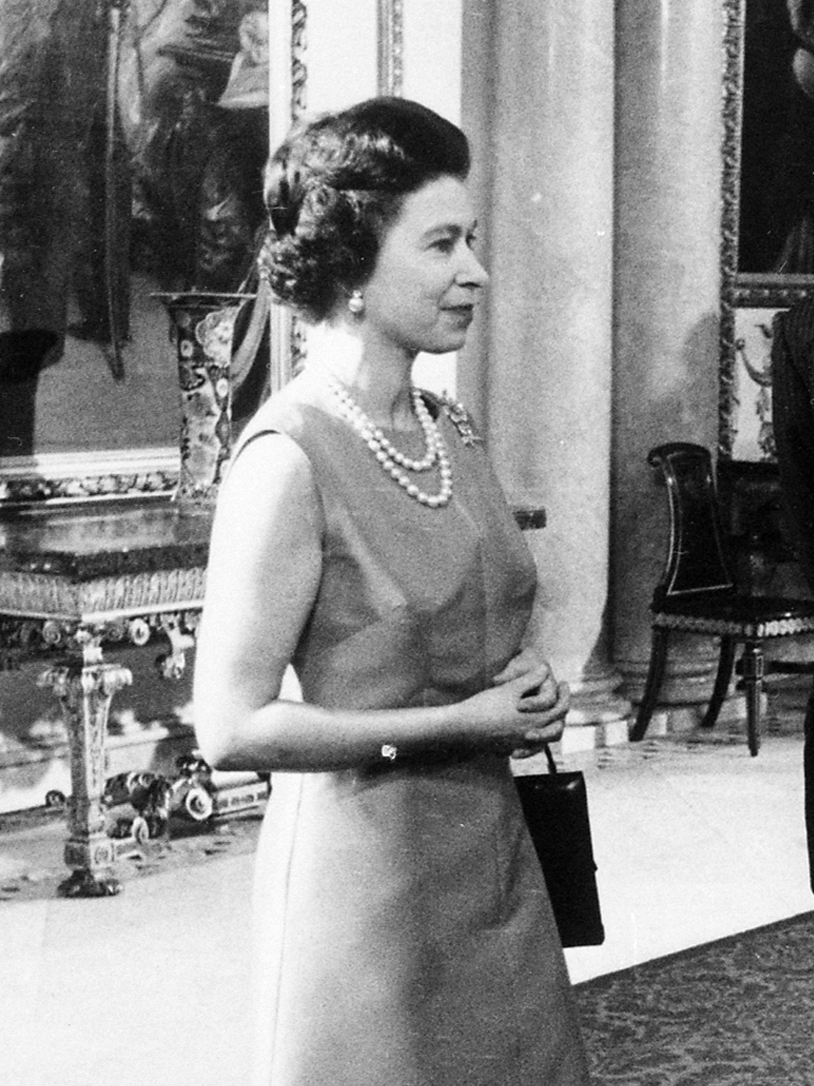
Queen Elizabeth II, visited Deakin Reserve in 1954

This sports venue was originally known as the cricket reserve in its very early years, then later known as the Shepparton Recreation Reserve, prior to being officially named the Deakin Reserve in 1947, in honour of former Victorian Water Supply Minister, former Federal politician and Australian Prime Minister, Alfred Deakin who was largely responsible for implementing the Goulburn Valley Irrigation Scheme.

In April 1875 a public meeting was called for in Shepparton for the purpose of appointing Trustees for the Shepparton Park and Recreation Grounds.

The first published mention of the cricket ground was in 1875, when the Shepparton Eleven had arranged a match against the Euroa Eleven and the Shepparton team "were practising hard on their local ground in the township".

Local Australian Rules Football teams, Shepparton and Shepparton Ramblers Football Club both used the Recreation Reserve as their home ground in the early 1890s.

In 1888, the Shepparton Cricket Club advertised for tenders for the erection of a sawn timber fence around the Shepparton Cricket and Recreation Reserve.

In March 1899 a local committee was formed of the Shepparton Athletics Carnival, with Dr. E. Ken Herring as the chairman of the organising committee, featuring athletics and bicycling events, with the first carnival at the Shepparton Showgrounds in April 1899, but was later moved to Shepparton Recreation Reserve.

In 1904, the Shepparton Shire Council approved and funded the erection of the first sports Pavilion on the Shepparton Recreation Reserve.

The original grandstand at the Reserve was erected in 1905 and the local Shepparton Athletics Carnival contributed financially to its erection.

The eighth annual Shepparton Athletics Carnival was held at the Shepparton Recreation Reserve for the first time in 1906, with £325 in prize money offered.

Construction of the Deakin Reserve Memorial Column and the installation of ornamental lights on the King George VI Memorial Gates, as well as bronze plaques was completed in December 1952. These gates and plaques were officially opened by Victorian Premier, John McDonald and Mrs Herbert Brookes, daughter of former Prime Minister, Alfred Deakin.

When Queen Elizabeth II and Prince Philip, Duke of Edinburgh visited Shepparton in 1954, an estimated 40,000 packed Deakin Reserve and the nearby streets for the Royal Reception.

The first recorded international cricket match held on the ground came in 1962 when a Victoria Country Eleven side played the Marylebone Cricket Club, when the English cricket team in Australia in 1962–63

A Youth Test match was held in December 1986 when Australia Under-19s played Indian Under-19s.

A Youth One Day International was later held there in November 1997 when Australia Under-19s played Pakistan Under-19s.

A List A match was held there in the 2006–07 Ford Ranger Cup between Victoria and Western Australia.

Australian Rules Football and netball are also played at the ground.

Since 1957, the Goulburn Valley Football League grand final has been played at the Deakin Reserve.

Deakin Reserve has hosted a number of VFL / AFL practices matches over the years, with the last of these being in March 2019 between Melbourne and Richmond.

== Shepparton Sports Carnival ==
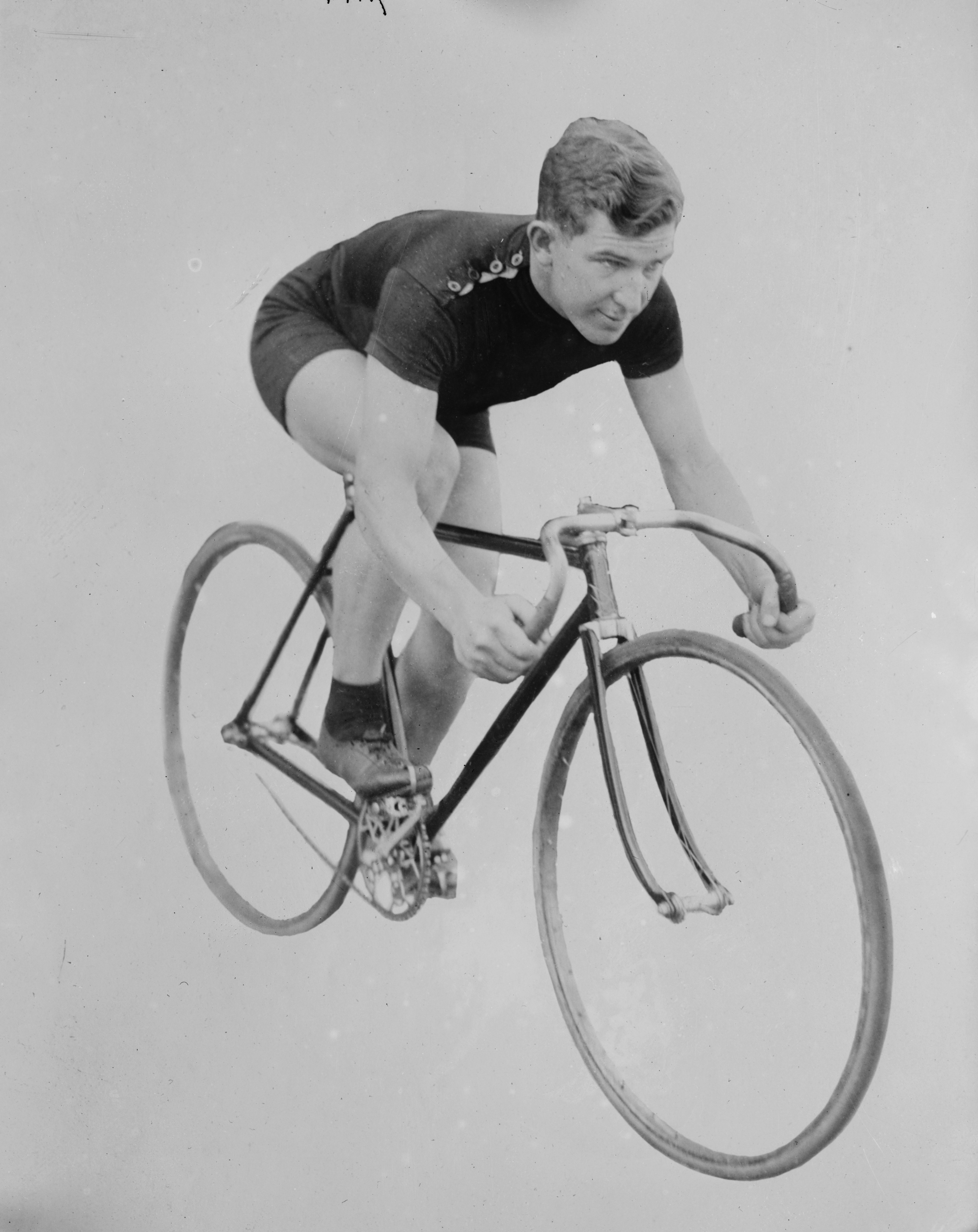
1905 Local Shepparton Wheelrace winner & world record breaking cyclist: Jackie Clark

The honour board below acknowledges former office bearers and winners of the Sheffield Handicap, later renamed the Shepparton Gift and the Shepparton Wheelrace, which was held at the Shepparton Recreation Reserve (Deakin Reserve) from 1906 onwards.

The Sheffield Handicap was run over 130 yards, while the main wheelrace distance was over two miles. The very first two-mile race in 1899 was a dead heat.

The Shepparton Wheelrace was later raced over one mile.

In fact, the very first sports carnival held in Shepparton was back in 1879 on the site of the Shepparton Railway Station, just a year before the railway line was opened.

Over the many years of the carnival, the following sports took part, athletics, amateur and professional cycling, wood chopping, boxing, speed coursing (greyhound racing), fire brigade events, national dancing, fireworks, novelty attractions and a large betting ring.

In 1904, Shepparton cyclist, A J "Jackie" Clark won the famous Austral Wheel Race, then in 1905 he won the Shepparton Wheelrace and Adelaide Wheelrace, before heading over to Europe and America, to continue his riding career and set many world records along the way. Clark went onto win the Six Days of New York event in 1909 and 1911 and the Six Days of Berlin in 1913, just to name a few.

Prior to 1923, the annual carnival was held in February each year, then from 1923, the carnival was held on Foundation Day, one of the precursors of Australia Day, which was the last weekend in January.

By around 1930, the Shepparton Carnival was widely recognised as the premier sports carnival in northern Victoria by both athletes and patrons.

In September, 1933, the Sports Carnival committee decided to suspend its annual carnival, due to be held in January, 1934, due to a financial loss at the previous three carnivals, but after much public support the committee decided to go ahead with a carnival in January, 1934.

At the carnival's annual general meeting in November, 1934 the carnival went into recess, after the fourth annual loss in a row, which wiped out the carnival's bank account reserves, due indirectly to the Great Depression which meant that there was no carnival in 1935 and 1936.

Then in July, 1936 an organising committee was reformed and the next carnival went ahead on the 1st January, 1937.

International renown cyclists, Nino Borsari and Syd Cozens both rode at the 1937 Shepparton Carnival.

In an organised carnival boxing bout, 23 year old Percival Pettit died in the Mooroopna Hospital after being knocked out in a fight on the 1st January, 1938 at the sports carnival at the Shepparton Recreation Reserve.

One of the biggest ever crowds at Deakin Reserve was at the 1948 Shepparton Athletics Carnival, where an estimated 10,000 patrons paid a record £920 on New Year's Day.

In 1951, Danish cyclist, Carl Jorgan Koblauch crashed heavily after winning the fifth heat of the Aces Half Mile Derby on New Year's Day at the Shepparton Sports Carnival and was pronounced dead at the Mooroopna Hospital.

At the 1953 night session of the Shepparton Carnival, an estimated 15,000 spectators were present to watch crowd favourite and world champion cyclist, Sid Patterson.

In 1953, Geelong cyclist, Rex Kelly, 22 years of age, died in hospital, after crashing head first into an electric light pole in the third heat of the City Sprint at 3.16 pm, at the New Year's Day Sports Carnival at Deakin Reserve, after a fellow competitor punctured in front of him.

In 1958, local runner, Lance Watters won the Shepparton Gift and later won the Burramine Gift in 1961. Watters had also just started up the business, Watters Electrical in Shepparton in the late 1950's.

	Shepparton Athletic Carnival							
Year	President	Secretary	Treasurer	Shepparton Gift	Shepparton Wheelrace	Venue	Gate / Crowd	Date
1899	Dr E Ken Herring	John Stubbs	A Whitehead	A Walters	G O'Callaghan &	Showgrounds		19/04/1899
					W J Lindsay >	(dead heat)		
1900	Dr E Ken Herring	John Stubbs	A Whitehead	W J Hart	H Symonds	Showgrounds		04/04/1900
1901	Dr E Ken Herring	John Stubbs	A Whitehead	Fred R Murray	B Rolfe	Showgrounds		13/02/1901
1902	Dr E Ken Herring	John Stubbs	A Whitehead	J P O'Connell	W F Darcy	Showgrounds	£69	12/02/1902
1903	Dr E Ken Herring	John Stubbs	A Whitehead	Fred R Murray	C E Burton	Showgrounds	£62	11/02/1903
1904	W R Banner	John Stubbs	A Whitehead	A C P O'Brien	J Greenaway	Showgrounds	£69	10/02/1904
1905	F W Fair	John Stubbs	A Whitehead	A Maskell	A J "Jackie" Clark	Showgrounds	£90	15/02/1905
1906	W McAbernethy	John Stubbs	A Whitehead	Norm Oliver	B S Joyce	Recreation Reserve	£260	12&13/02/1906
1907	W McAbernethy	John Stubbs	A Whitehead	Fred R Murray	A J Davies	Recreation Reserve	£342	12&13/02/1907
1908	D McAndrews	John Stubbs	A Whitehead	H Kiley	A J Davies	Recreation Reserve	£335	11&12/02/1908
1909	George V Furphy	John Stubbs	A Whitehead	Wally Hartley	cancelled > rain	Recreation Reserve	£270	23&24/02/1909
1910	F W Fair	John Stubbs	A Whitehead	A A Taylor	R Pyke	Recreation Reserve	£349	08&09/02/1910
1911	W R Banner	John Stubbs	A Whitehead	Archibald Clark	G L Crawford	Recreation Reserve	£388	07&08/02/1911
1912	W H Allen	John Stubbs		R "Bob" Carnie	T G Walcott	Recreation Reserve	£415 / 12,000	13&14/02/1912
1913	J P Downing	John Stubbs	A Whitehead	Wally Hartley	L H Parkinson	Recreation Reserve	£465 / 14,000	11&12/02/1913
1914	J P Downing	John Stubbs	A Whitehead	G H Best	Ernest Bainbridge	Recreation Reserve	£471 /	10&11/02/1914
1915	W R Vincent	John Stubbs	A Whitehead	L J Hume	R Gardner	Recreation Reserve	£384	12&13/02/1915
1916	M Haplin	John Stubbs	T Corkill	S Keane	J G Atkins	Recreation Reserve	£311	08&09/02/1916
1917	A Biggar	John Stubbs	T Corkill	R A Taylor	J G Atkins	Recreation Reserve	£297	13&14/02/1917
1918	A Biggar	John Stubbs	S H Drury	1st:Stan Hawkins	P J Sheehan?	Recreation Reserve	£232	13/02/1913
				2nd:John Beckwith	>(won on protest)			
1919		John Stubbs		Jim McNeil		Recreation Reserve		16/04/1919
1920		John Stubbs		G E Davis	L D Harris	Recreation Reserve		10&11/02/1920
1921	J Kendall	John Stubbs	H B Lincoln	G Bond	L C Stevens	Recreation Reserve	£372 / 6,000	19&20/04/1921
1922	A W Sims	John Stubbs	H B Lincoln	Les E G McLeod		Recreation Reserve		14&15/02/1922
1923	J H Waltho	John Stubbs		Bert Love	J Beasley	Recreation Reserve	£453	29/01/1923
1924	H B Lincoln	John Stubbs	H Cecil Jacob	A C Klemm	L C Stevens	Recreation Reserve	£453	28/01/1924
1925	W T Daish	John Stubbs	H Cecil Jacob	L H Kew Ming	H A Hawkins	Recreation Reserve	£504	26/01/1925
1926	A Henderson	John Stubbs	A H Palmer	Harry Simpson	J Beasley	Recreation Reserve	£505	01/02/1926
1927	J J Beattie	John Stubbs	A H Palmer	H Nicholls	E Strang	Recreation Reserve	£570	31/01/1927
1928	J J Bettie	John Stubbs	A H Palmer	T G Whitla	W Redman	Recreation Reserve	£605	30/01/1928
1929	B S Smith	John Stubbs	A H Palmer	Alf Barton	E H Simpson	Recreation Reserve	£578	28/01/1929
1930	A F Mackwood	John Stubbs	A H Palmer	H Rumney	P Wells	Recreation Reserve	£550	27/01/1930
1931	John Gibbs	John Stubbs	A H Palmer	M Maroney (Wang)	A Price	Recreation Reserve	£322	26/01/1931
1932	John Gibbs	John Stubbs	A H Palmer	T W Odgen	W Clements	Recreation Reserve	£389	01/02/1932
1933	T H Peart	John Stubbs	A H Palmer	G L Evans	H W Lygon	Recreation Reserve	£254	01/02/1933
1934		John Stubbs		J H Lester	R J Moore	Recreation Reserve	£350	20/01/1934
1935							In recess	
1936	Cr J Riordan	W S Clayton	Percy H Anderson				No carnival in '36	
1937	G S A Gaylard	Les J Hellier	Percy H Anderson	P Kiniry	L Cutts	Recreation Reserve	£473	01/01/1937
1938	Joe E McMahon	Les J Hellier	Percy H Anderson	Arthur Rosenow	Harry Woolrich	Recreation Reserve	£550	01/01/1938
1939	Joe McMahon	Les J Hellier	Percy H Anderson	Paul Bell	J Cremin	Recreation Reserve	£590	02/01/1939
1940	Joe E McMahon	Pat O'Connell	Percy H Anderson	P W Buckley	Tassy Johnson	Recreation Reserve	£475 / 3,000	01/01/1940
1941	Lou J Michel	Pat O'Connell		R A Archie Wright	L Solomons	Recreation Reserve	£423	01/01/1941
1942							In recess > WW2	01/01/1942
1943							In recess > WW2	
1944	Lou J Michel	Jim P Esson	A L Bool				In recess > WW2	
1945	Lou J Michel	Jim P Esson	A L Bool	C B Wilson	Bruce Opperman	Recreation Reserve	£451	01/01/1945
1946	Lou J Michel	Jim P Esson	A L Bool	J M Scammell	R Daldy	Recreation Reserve	£751	01/01/1946
1947	Lou J Michel, MBE	Jim P Esson	A L Bool	D Barry Hall	K Croft	Recreation Reserve	£823	01/01/1947
1948	Cr L C Trevaskis	Jim P Esson	H T Donaldson	Reg Letcher	E Robinson	Deakin Reserve	£920 / 10,000	01/01/1948
1949	Cr L C Trevaskis			Jim T Smith	Norm Beitzel	Deakin Reserve	£925	01/01/1049
1950	R A Wright	Jim P Esson	H T Donaldson	E Ted P Marantelli	J J Walsh	Deakin Reserve	£1090 / 10,000	01/01/1950
1951	R A Wright	Jim P Esson	J Greening	Tom Carney		Deakin Reserve	£1042	01/01/1951
1952	W A Thompson	Jim P Esson	J Greening	R C Sampson	Sid Patterson	Deakin Reserve		01/01/1952
1953		Jim P Esson		John Newman	Vin Smith	Deakin Reserve	£1602 / 15,000	01/01/1953
1954				Eddie T Dunstan	Sid Patterson	Deakin Reserve		01/01/1954
1955				Peter Nelson	Hec Sutherland	Deakin Reserve		03/01/1955
1956				W "Bill" R Mills	Sid Patterson	Deakin Reserve		02/01/1956
1957						Deakin Reserve		
1958				Lance Watters		Deakin Reserve		01/01/1958
1959				Alan Goodlet	D Burgess	Deakin Reserve		01/01/1959
1960					Ron Petri			01/01/1960
1961					Bill Toohey			02/01/1961
1967				Noel Pattison				04/03/1967
2023				Jack Lacey	N/A	Showgrounds		18/03/2023
2024				Jared Oliver	N/A	Showgrounds		28/01/2024
2025				Kevin Brittain	N/A	Showgrounds		15/02/2025
Year	President	Secretary	Treasurer	Shepparton Gift	Shepparton Wheelrace	Venue	Gate / Crowd	Date

Life Members

- 19?? - John Stubbs
- 1931 - W R Banner
- 1951 - L J Michel
