= Clyde Hill (footballer) =

Australian rules footballer

Personal information
- Full name: Clyde Neil Hill
- Born: 5 December 1895; Mooroopna, Victoria
- Died: 12 May 1965 (aged 69); Mooroopna, Victoria
- Original team: Mooroopna
- Height: 185 cm (6 ft 1 in)
- Weight: 70 kg (154 lb)

Playing career^{1}
Years	Club	Games (Goals)
1923	Carlton	1 (0)
- ^{1} Playing statistics correct to the end of 1923.

Clyde Neil Hill (5 December 1895 – 12 May 1965) was an Australian rules footballer who played with Carlton in the Victorian Football League (VFL).

Hill played in Mooroopna's 1923 Goulburn Valley Football League's premiership team, kicking five out the team's six goals and also lead the 1926 Goulburn Valley Football League goal kicking, with 46 goals.

Hill had balance and was an accurate kick for goal.

Hill played 22 seasons of Australian Rules football, with most of that played with the Mooroopna Football Club.

Hill served in the Australian Army in both World War One and World War Two.
