= Ron Simpson (Australian footballer) =

Australian rules footballer (1926–2016)

Personal information
- Full name: Ronald William Simpson
- Born: 22 April 1926; Echuca, Victoria
- Died: 11 August 2016 (aged 90); Bundaberg, Queensland
- Original teams: Tongala, Cobram
- Height: 188 cm (6 ft 2 in)
- Weight: 83 kg (183 lb)
- Position: Ruck

Playing career^{1}
Years	Club	Games (Goals)
1949–53	Fitzroy	37 (23)
- ^{1} Playing statistics correct to the end of 1953.

Ronald William Simpson (22 April 1926 – 11 August 2016) was an Australian rules footballer who played with Fitzroy in the Victorian Football League (VFL).

Simpson won Tongala's best and fairest award in 1944.

In 1945, he enlisted in the Royal Australian Air Force.

Simpson won the 1948 Murray Football League best and fairest award, the O'Dwyer Medal, representing Cobram.
