= Des Campbell =

Australian rules footballer

Personal information
- Full name: Des Campbell
- Born: 19 January 1951 (age 75)
- Original team: Shepparton United
- Height: 188 cm (6 ft 2 in)
- Weight: 94 kg (207 lb)

Playing career^{1}
Years	Club	Games (Goals)
1970, 1975–77	Melbourne	50 (13)
- ^{1} Playing statistics correct to the end of 1977.

Des Campbell (born 19 January 1951) is a former Australian rules footballer who played with Melbourne in the Victorian Football League (VFL).
