= Shepparton United Football Club =

Shepparton United

Names
- Full name: Shepparton United Football Netball Club
- Nickname(s): Demons

Club details
- Founded: 1950; 75 years ago
- Colours
- Competition: Goulburn Valley League
- President: Matthew Chilcott
- Coach: Rob Osborne
- Premierships: 12
- Ground(s): Deakin Reserve, Shepparton (capacity: 10,000)

Uniforms
Home

Other information
- Official website: sheppunitedfnc.com

The Shepparton United Football Netball Club, nicknamed the Demons, is an Australian rules football and netball based in the city of Shepparton in northern Victoria. The club teams currently compete in the Goulburn Valley League.

== History ==
The club now known as Shepparton United was originally called City United. It was admitted to the Goulburn Valley Football League in 1950 and had grown out of the Shepparton Preserving Company Football Club (SPC) and Shepparton East Football Club, who had previously fielded separate teams in the Central Goulburn Valley Football League.

United retained the red and blue colours of The Demons. It shares Deakin Reserve with co-tenants Shepparton Football Club (The Bears). One of the early important achievements was the construction of the H. T Luck Pavilion. It is named in honour of the club's association with SPC as Harry Luck was a former company director.

City United was immediately competitive, winning the reserves grand final in its first year in the Goulburn Valley Football League. This proved to be an omen as the senior team went on to win consecutive premierships under Kevin "Grumpy" Kenna in 1954, 1955 and 1956. As City United it won another flag in 1962 after the reserves team had won successive flags in 1960–61.

In 1962, thanks to a little help from played Thomas Jock Spencer – who would later be named in North Melbourne Team of the Century, former Shinboner John Brady was coaxed into coaching the club.

From 1966 a minor name change replaced City with Shepparton, thus United became Shepparton United.

United went on to win six more premierships, including winning all three football premierships in 1980 – at that time the only club to complete the "GV Grand Slam".

In the early 1980s, the club did not take long to recover from a deep financial crisis and went on to play in the 1984, 1985 and 1986 grand finals, only to lose and then broke through for three consecutive wins in 1987, 1988 and 1989.

In 1984, John Williams became the first United player to win a Morrison Medal, with Peter Foott repeating Williams's feat in 1992. Three United players have topped the league's goal-kicking on two occasions, with John Dainton in 1958 and 1959 (78 goals both years), Jock Spencer in 1963 (71) and 1965 (61) and Trevor Eddy in 1973 (125) and 1974 (114).

Brenton Cooper has kicked more than 100 goals on four occasions – winning the league goal-kicker in 1997 with 128.

Barry Connolly was made No. 1 ticket holder in 2003 following an 18-year stint a Goulburn Valley league chairman and is a former captain-coach, coach of the under 18s and president.

The club has won the George Hunter Champion Club award six times – 1980, 1984, 1987, 1989, 1999 and 2006.

From the inception of netball in 1981, United has remained a force with an A grade premiership win in 2005 and 15 lower grade premierships. Jacqui Hudgson won the Wellman Family Medal for the best and fairest player in A grade in 1998.

Chris Kennedy became a dominant footballer in the 1990s and early 2000s, with a record five Alan McCluskey Medals and playing in losing grand finals in 1999 and 2000.

After a grand final loss in 1999 to arch-rival Shepparton, and a preliminary final loss to Shepparton Swans in 2007, United broke a 21-year premiership drought in 2010 with a 24-point win against Kyabram in front of 11,000 people at its home ground Deakin Reserve, Shepparton. The following year United claimed back-to-back premierships in a 15-point win over rivals Mooroopna.

In 2016, the Under 18s snapped a 32-year drought and 10 losing grand finals in between when it defeated Euroa by 4 points. Led by Jack Norman who was named BOG and Garry Lyon Medallist for best player in the finals, he and Joshua Kezerle led the charge and brought it home for the Demons.

== AFL players ==
In more than five decades the club has produced many champions, including Tom Carey who played at North Melbourne, before returning to become a star of the competition after suffering a serious knee injury.

Des Campbell played in the 1967 premiership team as a teenager before a brief stint with AFL/VFL club Melbourne. He returned to lead the club to the 1974 and 1980 premierships as coach and won three Alan McCluskey Medals as the best and fairest player.

Chris Connolly played in the 1980 premiership team before joined Melbourne where he played 84 games. He later joined Hawthorn as an assistant coach before coaching the Fremantle Dockers to its first finals series.

Shaun Hart's last game for Shepparton United was in its 1989 premiership team before joining Brisbane. He played 273 games including three consecutive premierships (2001, 2002, 2003) and won a Norm Smith Medal for the best player on the ground in the club's 2001 win against Essendon.

Other players to play AFL lists include Melbourne's Adem Yze – an All-Australian representative – who retired in 2008 with 271 games, Justin Davies who played in two night premierships for Carlton, Jason Traianidis who played for St Kilda and Beau Muston who had an injury-shortened career at Hawthorn .

Michael Barlow won a club best and fairest at 19 and joined Fremantle Dockers at the start of the 2010 season.

Davies rejoined the club in 2014 season and Muston made a one-off appearance in Round 2 against the Shepp Bears.

== Football Premierships ==
Seniors

League	Total flags	Premiership years
Goulburn Valley Football League	12	1954, 1955, 1956, 1962, 1967, 1974, 1980, 1987, 1988, 1989, 2010, 2011
