= Tatura Football Club =

Tatura

Names
- Full name: Tatura Football Netball Club
- Nickname: Bulldogs

Club details
- Founded: 1894; 132 years ago
- Colours
- Competition: Goulburn Valley Football League
- Premierships: 11
- Ground: Tatura Show Grounds

Uniforms
Home

Other information
- Official website: taturabulldogs.com.au

The Tatura Football Netball Club, nicknamed the Bulldogs, is an Australian rules football and netball club sited in Tatura, Victoria.

Tatura teams currently compete in the Goulburn Valley League.

== History ==
In 1941, former coach, Private Frank Reddie was killed in action in World War Two.

== Football Premierships ==
Seniors

League	Total flags	Premiership years	Runner up
Goulburn Valley League	12	1898, 1900, 1901, 1902, 1904, 1905, 1952, 1953, 1995, 1998, 2003, 2012	1903, 1908, 1919, 1923, 1924, 1948, 1951, 1954, 1957, 1992, 2004,

Reserves

League	Total flags	Premiership year(s)	Runner up
Goulburn Valley League	6	1948, 1966, 1968, 1972, 1988, 2009,	

Thirds

League	Total flags	Premiership year(s)	Runner up
Goulburn Valley League	3	1956, 1962, 1963	

== Tatura's VFL / AFL players ==
- Bill Heaphy (Essendon 1908-09) 5 games
- Bill Fischer (Melb 1909) 1 game
- Archie Wilson (Carlton 1910-13) 31 games
- Frank Pritchard (Carlton 1922-23) 20 games
- George Pennicott (St Kilda 1923) 1 game
- Roy Dick (Carlton 1923) 1 game
- Matt Wilkins (Hawthorn 1929) 2 games
- Jack Hunter (Essendon 1940 North Melbourne 1944-45) 9 games
- Bill Pritchard (Geelong 1948-51) 21 games
- Barrie Smith (Carlton 1960) 6 games
- Bruce Baker (Fitzroy 1969-70) 16 games
- Peter Warburton (Carlton 1971-72) 4 games
- Kevin Payne (Melb Reserves 1977-79)
- Michael Warnett (Melb and Melb Reserves 1982)
- Paul Payne (Melb 1985-88) 28 games
- Chris Chant (Melb Under 19's and Reserves 1984-85)
- Adrian Battiston (Melb 1982-87) (Syd 1988-89) 105 games
- Allister Burke (1989 National Draft - Number 74)
- Garry Merritt (1990 National Draft - Number 19)
