= Goulburn Valley League =

Australian rules football and netball competition

- Sport: Australian rules football Netball
- Founded: 1893; 133 years ago
- Owner: AFL - Goulburn Murray
- CEO: Brad Noonan
- President: Peter Foott
- No. of teams: 12
- Country: Australia
- Headquarters: Deakin Reserve, Shepparton, Victoria
- Most recent champion: Echuca (2026)
- Most titles: Shepparton (27)
- Sponsor: GoTAFE
- Level on pyramid: 4: 1sts, 2nds, U/18, U/16
- Related competitions: VFL; MFL
- Website: https://gvleague.com.au

The Goulburn Valley League (GVL), also known as the Goulburn Valley Football Netball League (GVFNL), is an Australian rules football and netball competition based in the Goulburn Valley region of Victoria.

== History ==
The league was initially called the Goulburn Valley District Football Association (GVDFA) and dates back to May 1893. Clubs from the townships of Kyabram, Mooroopna, Nagambie, Nathalia, Numurkah, Shepparton, Shepparton Ramblers, Tatura, Undera and Wunghnu were present at the inaugural meeting, with club's deciding to play on a Wednesday afternoon.

The five original clubs that chose to play on Wednesdays that made up the 1893 GVDFA draw were – Kyabram, Mooroopna, Shepparton, Shepparton Ramblers and Tatura with Mooroopna defeating the Shepparton Ramblers in the 1893 GVDFA grand final.

In 1894, the following six teams competed in the Goulburn Valley District Football Association - Kyabram, Mooroopna, Shepparton, Shepparton Ramblers, Tatura and Undera.

Murchison came into the GVDFA in 1895 and Kyabram did not join, but were active playing a number of friendly matches against other local teams.

In 1896, the Shepparton FC and Shepparton Ramblers FC merged to form the "Shepparton and Ramblers United FC" and wore the following colors - blue and white jumper, with a yellow band, white knicks and black and yellow socks.

As the GVDFA went into recess in 1897, this newly merged club appears to of reformed in 1898 in the GFDVA as just the Shepparton FC.

In 1910, Shepparton Imperials defeated Kialla in the East and West Goulburn Valley Football Association grand final.

At the 1914 – GVDFA – Annual General Meeting, the club delegate's voted to change the name of the competition to the Goulburn Valley Football League to save a lot of confusion with another local football competition, the Goulburn Valley Football Association, which was based out of Numurkah, which was made up from club's in the northern Goulburn Valley region.

Later clubs from Rushworth, Murchison, Tongala and Echuca would spend time in this league.

In 1924, the Goulburn Valley Football League: 15.17 - 107 defeated Collingwood: 14.15 - 99.

Between 1926 and 1936, there was a Goulburn Valley Second Eighteens Football Association competition that was based in and around Shepparton, that was superseded by the Goulburn Valley Football Association in 1937.

Rushworth FC had a golden era between 1929 and 1940, where they played off in ten grand finals and they managed to win five premierships.

Rushworth footballer, Bernie Collins played in Rushworth's four premierships from 1930 to 1933, then moved to Shepparton with his employment and then played in Shepparton's 1934 premiership too.

In 1935, Mooroopna FC pulled out the GVFL and played in the Goulburn Valley Second Eighteens Football Association competition.

Prior to World War II this league used to play on Wednesday afternoon, but in 1939 the league decided to change to Saturday afternoon, Shepparton and Mooroopna objected and refused to play on Saturdays so both clubs went into recess.

In 1948, the GVFL introduced the Reserves football competition, with Kyabram taking out the first premiership.

In 1995 the league absorbed the clubs from the Tungamah Football League and had a second division for three seasons (1996–1998). These second division clubs left and formed the Central Goulburn Football League in 1999. This league ceased in 2005.

Kyabram FC seniors went through 2016 and 2017 as undefeated premiers and were still undefeated leading into the 2018 grand final, but lost to Shepparton FC, ending a winning streak of 62 games, which is a GVFNL record.

Kyabram then went on to be undefeated premiers in 2019, thus only losing one game since their 2015 GVFNL grand final loss to Benalla FC.

== Current clubs ==
=== Locations ===
Club locations - Shepparton/Mooroopna	Club locations - Goulburn Valley
Locations of the Goulburn Valley FL clubs - Shepparton/Mooroopna	Locations of the Goulburn Valley FL clubs - Goulburn Valley

Club	Colours	Nickname	Home Ground	Former League	Est.	Years in GVFL	GVFL Senior Premierships	
Club	Colours	Nickname	Home Ground	Former League	Est.	Years in GVFL	Total	Years
Benalla		Saints	Benalla Showgrounds, Benalla	BMFL, OMFL	1896	1940, 1997–	2	1940, 2015
Echuca		Murray Bombers	Victoria Park, Echuca	BFL	1876	1909–1923, 1974–	9	1977, 1979, 1997, 2001, 2002, 2022, 2023, 2024, 2026
Euroa		Magpies	Memorial Oval, Euroa	WNEFA	1880	1939–1940, 1971–	2	1971, 1990
Kyabram		Bombers	Kyabram Recreation Reserve, Kyabram	–	1886	1893–1894, 1899-	16	1919, 1921, 1922, 1926, 1927, 1928, 1948, 1950, 1958, 1975, 1996, 2013, 2016, 2017, 2019, 2025
Mansfield		Eagles	Mansfield Recreation Reserve, Mansfield	TFL	1880s	1998–	2	2004, 2009
Mooroopna		Cats	Mooroopna Recreation Reserve, Mooroopna	CGVFL	1877	1893–1934, 1936–1938, 1949–	12	1893, 1894, 1895, 1896, 1907, 1923, 1924, 1936, 1937, 1938, 1985, 1986
Rochester		Tigers	Rochester Recreation Reserve, Rochester	BFL	1874	1913–1914, 1973–	4	1914, 1992, 1999, 2008
Seymour		Lions	Kings Park, Seymour	WNEFA	1880	1939, 1976–	7	1976, 1981, 1982, 1991, 2005, 2006, 2007
Shepparton		Bears	Deakin Reserve, Shepparton	CGVFL	1880s	1893–1895, 1898–1938, 1949–	27	1899, 1903, 1906, 1908, 1909, 1911, 1912, 1913, 1920, 1925, 1929, 1934, 1951, 1957, 1963, 1964, 1965, 1966, 1968, 1969, 1972, 1973, 1978, 1993, 1994, 2000, 2018
Shepparton Swans (Lemnos 1946-98)		Swans	Princess Park, Shepparton	GVFA	1928	1946–	4	1959, 1960, 1970, 2014
Shepparton United (City United 1950-65)		Demons	Deakin Reserve, Shepparton	–	1950	1950–	12	1954, 1955, 1956, 1962, 1967, 1974, 1980, 1987, 1988, 1989, 2010, 2011
Tatura		Bulldogs	Tatura Recreation Reserve, Tatura	–	1894	1894–	12	1898, 1900, 1901, 1902, 1904, 1905, 1952, 1953, 1995, 1998, 2003, 2012

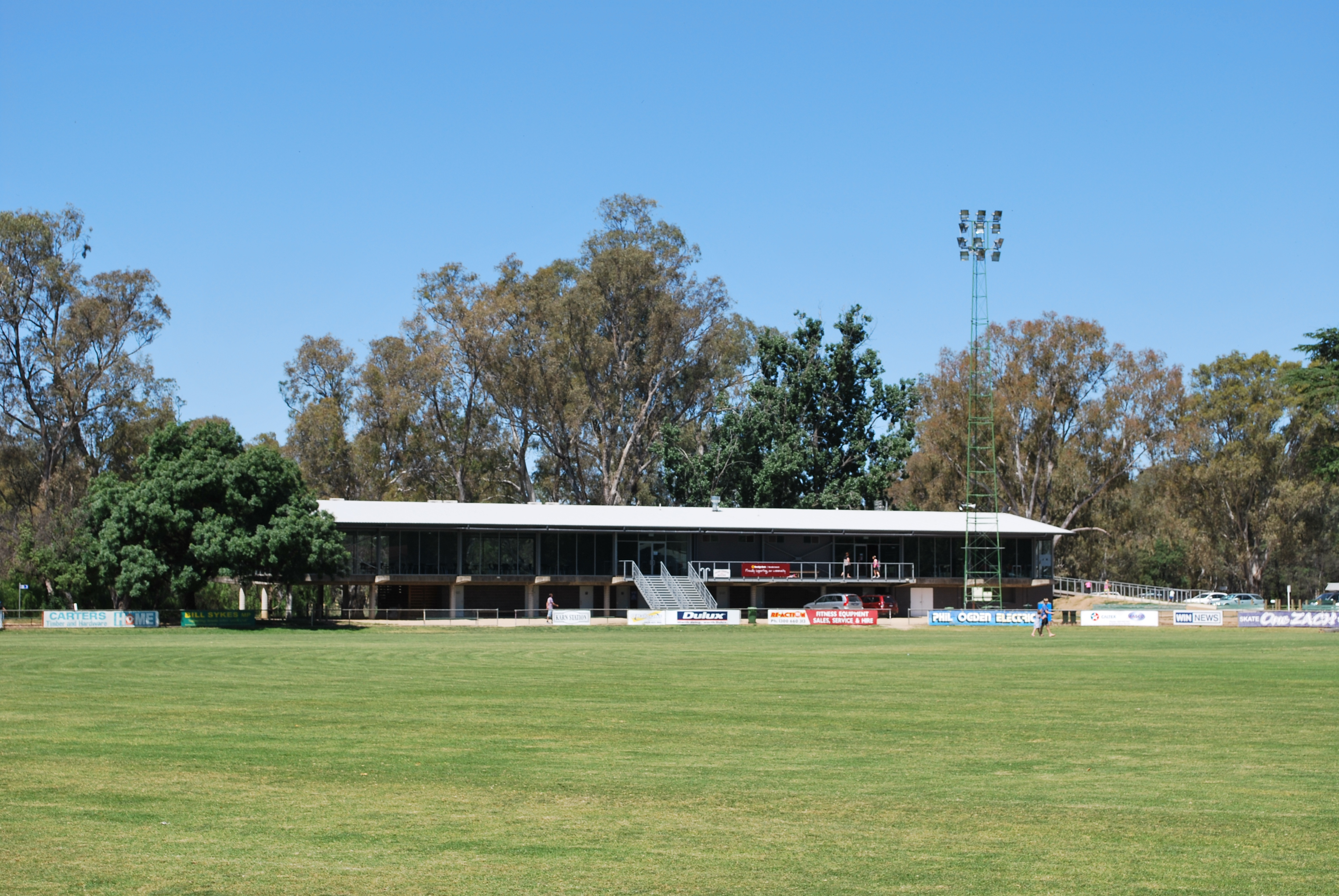
Benalla Showgrounds Oval: Clubrooms

== Former clubs ==
Club	Colours	Nickname	Home Ground	Former League	Est.	Years in GVFL	GVFL Senior Premierships		Fate
Club	Colours	Nickname	Home Ground	Former League	Est.	Years in GVFL	Total	Years	Fate
Avenel		Swans	Avenel Recreation Reserve, Avenel	WNEFA	c. 1890s	1939	0	—	Moved to Euroa District FA following 1939 season
Echuca East		Hoppers	Echuca Recreation Reserve, Echuca	EFL	c. 1890s	1949-1952	0	—	Returned to Echuca FL following 1952 season
Murchison		Hoppers	Murchison Recreation Reserve, Murchison	WFA, WNEFA, EDFA	1879	1895, 1908-1912, 1919-1939, 1946-1963	1	1910	Moved to Upper Goulburn FA in 1897. Played in Waranga North East FA in 1913-14. Moved to Kyabram District FNL following 1963 season
Nagambie		Lakers	Nagambie Recreation Reserve, Nagambie	WNEFA	1881	1912, 1939–1964	3	1939, 1946, 1947	Moved to Kyabram District FNL following 1964 season
Prisoner of War Group 13				–	1942	1946	0	—	Folded
Rushworth		Tigers	Rushworth Recreation Reserve, Rushworth	WNEFA	1882	1908-1912, 1919-1964	5	1930, 1931 1932, 1933, 1935	Moved to Heathcote District FNL following 1964 season
Shepparton & Ramblers United	Blue and white jumper w/yellow band, white knicks, black and yellow socks.		Shepparton Recreation Reserve	–	1896	1896	0	—	Club & GVDFA entered recess in 1897, then the club name went back to just Shepparton FC in 1898.
Shepparton (Shepparton Imperials)			Deakin Reserve, Shepparton	GVSEFA	1924	1930	0	—	Returned to Goulburn Valley Second Eighteen FA in 1931
Shepparton Ramblers			Shepparton Recreation Reserve	–	1893	1893-1895	0	—	Merged with Shepparton to form Shepparton & Ramblers United in 1896.
Stanhope		Lions	Stanhope Recreation Reserve, Stanhope	KDFNL	1921	1946-1947, 1956-1974	0	—	Played merged with Girgarre between 1948-55. Moved to Heathcote District FNL following 1964 season
Stanhope-Girgarre				–	1948	1948-1955	0	—	De-merged following 1955 season to re-form Stanhope and Girgarre
Tongala		Blues	Tongala Recreation Reserve, Tongala	KDJFA	1894	1924-1931, 1946-2005	4	1949, 1961, 1983, 1984	Recess in 1932, re-formed in Echuca FL in 1933. Moved to Murray FNL after 2005 season
Undera			Undera Recreation Reserve, Undera, Victoria		1888	1894, 1898-1901	0	—	Folded in 1902, joined East Goulburn FA in 1910.

=== Division 2 ===
Following the demise of the Tungamah Football League following the 1995 season, 8 of its 9 clubs formed the new second division of the Goulburn Valley Football League. This division ran separately to the first division with no promotion or relegation between the two. The newly-formed Rumbalara club debuted in Division 2 in 1997. Congupna left for the Murray FL in 1998 and Mansfield joined Division 1 the same year. Following the 1998 season, the Division 2 clubs split from the GVFL to form the Central Goulburn Football League.

==== Final clubs ====
Club	Colours	Nickname	Home Ground	Former League	Est.	Years in GVFL	GVFL Division 2 Premierships		Fate
Club	Colours	Nickname	Home Ground	Former League	Est.	Years in GVFL	Total	Years	Fate
Alexandra		Rebels	Alexandra Showgrounds, Alexandra	TFL	1884	1996-1998	1	1997	Moved to Central Goulburn FL in 1999
Benalla All Blacks		Panthers	Friendlies Oval, Benalla	TFL	1934	1996-1998	0	—	Moved to Central Goulburn FL in 1999
Dookie United		Kangaroos	Dookie Recreation Reserve, Dookie	TFL	1977	1996-1998	0	—	Moved to Central Goulburn FL in 1999
Rumbalara		Rumba	Rumbalara Recreation Reserve, Shepparton	–	1997	1997-1998	1	1998	Moved to Central Goulburn FL in 1999
Shepparton East		Eagles	Central Park Recreation Reserve, Shepparton East	TFL	1925	1996-1998	0	—	Moved to Central Goulburn FL in 1999
Thornton-Eildon		Shinboners	Thornton Recreation Reserve, Thornton	TFL	1958	1996-1998	0	—	Moved to Central Goulburn FL in 1999
Violet Town		Towners	Violet Town Recreation Reserve, Violet Town	TFL	1880	1996-1998	0	—	Moved to Central Goulburn FL in 1999

==== Former clubs ====
Club	Colours	Nickname	Home Ground	Former League	Est.	Years in GVFL	GVFL Division 2 Premierships		Fate
Club	Colours	Nickname	Home Ground	Former League	Est.	Years in GVFL	Total	Years	Fate
Congupna		The Road	Congupna Recreation Reserve, Congupna	TFL	1956	1996-1997	0	—	Moved to Murray FNL after 1997 season
Mansfield		Demons	Mansfield Recreation Reserve, Mansfield	TFL	1880s	1996-1997	1	1996	Joined GVFL Division 1 in 1998

== Football Premiers ==
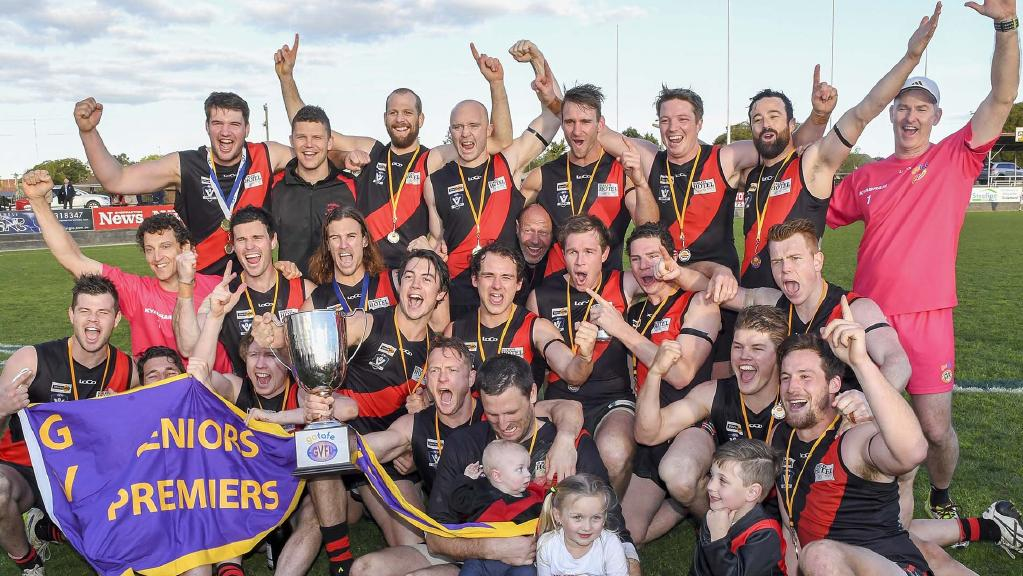
2016 - GVFNL Premiers: Kyabram FC

Year	Seniors	Reserves	Thirds
2026	Echuca	Echuca	Shepparton
2025	Kyabram	Seymour	Shepparton
2024	Echuca	Echuca	Echuca
2023	Echuca	Shepparton United	Echuca
2022	Echuca	Echuca	Echuca
2021	1st: Echuca (minor premiers)	1st: Echuca	1st: Echuca
2020	2020: GVFNL in recess > COVID-19. 2021: 11 games played, but no finals due to COVID-19		
2019	Kyabram (undefeated)	Seymour	Echuca
2018	Shepparton	Kyabram	Echuca
2017	Kyabram (undefeated)	Kyabram	Shepparton United
2016	Kyabram (undefeated)	Mansfield	Shepparton United
2015	Benalla	Mooroopna	Benalla
2014	Shepparton Swans	Euroa	Benalla
2013	Kyabram	Shepparton United	Kyabram
2012	Tatura	Mooroopna	Shepparton
2011	Shepparton United	Tatura	Shepparton
2010	Shepparton United	Kyabram	Shepparton
2009	Mansfield	Tatura	Kyabram
2008	Rochester	Seymour	Echuca
2007	Seymour	Echuca	Seymour
2006	Seymour	Seymour	Shepparton
2005	Seymour	Shepparton	Shepparton
2004	Mansfield	Shepparton	Benalla
2003	Tatura	Benalla	Kyabram
2002	Echuca	Shepparton Swans	Benalla
2001	Echuca	Shepparton Swans	Shepparton
2000	Shepparton	Shepparton	Shepparton
1999	Rochester	Shepparton United	Kyabram
1998	Tatura	Kyabram	Benalla
1997	Echuca	Euroa	Shepparton
1996	Kyabram	Echuca	Rochester
1995	Tatura	Echuca	Kyabram
1994	Shepparton	Shepparton	Echuca
1993	Shepparton	Shepparton United	Lemnos
1992	Rochester	Kyabram	Shepparton
1991	Seymour	Kyabram	Shepparton
1990	Euroa	Kyabram	Shepparton
1989	Shepparton United	Shepparton United	Shepparton
1988	Shepparton United	Tatura	Shepparton
1987	Shepparton United	Shepparton	Shepparton
1986	Mooroopna	Seymour	Mooroopna
1985	Mooroopna	Lemnos	Kyabram
1984	Tongala	Mooroopna	Shepparton United
1983	Tongala	Seymour	Kyabram
1982	Seymour	Mooroopna	Mooroopna
1981	Seymour	Shepparton	Shepparton United
1980	Shepparton United	Shepparton United	Shepparton United
1979	Echuca	Kyabram	Shepparton United
1978	Shepparton	Echuca	Kyabram
1977	Echuca	Echuca	Shepparton United
1976	Seymour	Echuca	Echuca
1975	Kyabram	Echuca	Shepparton United
1974	Shepparton United	Kyabram	Lemnos
1973	Shepparton	Lemnos	Shepparton United
1972	Shepparton	Tatura	Lemnos
1971	Euroa	Kyabram	Lemnos
1970	Lemnos	Shepparton	Lemnos
1969	Shepparton	Mooroopna	Shepparton
1968	Shepparton	Tatura	Shepparton
1967	City United	Shepparton	Shepparton United
1966	Shepparton	Tatura	Kyabram
1965	Shepparton	Shepparton	Kyabram
1964	Shepparton	Tongala	
1963	Shepparton	Kyabram	Tatura
1962	City United	Shepparton	Tatura
1961	Tongala	City United	
1960	Lemnos	City United	
1959	Lemnos	Kyabram	
1958	Kyabram	Tongala	
1957	Shepparton	Tongala	
1956	City United	Shepparton(36th consecutive win)	Tatura
1955	City United	Shepparton	
1954	City United	Mooroopna	
1953	Tatura	Tongala	
1952	Tatura	City United	
1951	Shepparton	Kyabram	
1950	Kyabram	City United (undefeated)	
1949	Tongala	Kyabram	
1948	Kyabram	Kyabram	
		1sts Runners Up below	
1947	Nagambie	Kyabram	
1946	Nagambie	Camp 13	
1941-45	In recess > WW2		
1940	Benalla	Rushworth	
1939	Nagambie (undefeated)	Rushworth	
1938	Mooroopna	Shepparton	
1937	Mooroopna	Rushworth	
1936	Mooroopna	Murchison	
1935	Rushworth	Shepparton	
1934	Shepparton	Rushworth	
1933	Rushworth	Shepparton	
1932	Rushworth	Mooroopna	
1931	Rushworth	Mooroopna	
1930	Rushworth	Murchison	
1929	Shepparton	Rushworth	
1928	Kyabram	Shepparton	
1927	Kyabram	Shepparton	
1926	Kyabram	Shepparton	
1925	Shepparton	Kyabram	
1924	Mooroopna	Tatura	
1923	Mooroopna	Tatura	
1922	Kyabram	Shepparton	
1921	Kyabram	Tatura	
1920	Shepparton	Murchison	
1919	Kyabram	Tatura	
1915 - 18	In recess > WW1		
1914	Rochester	Shepparton	
1913	Shepparton	Rochester	
1912	Shepparton (undefeated)	Murchison	
1911	Shepparton	Echuca	
1910	Murchison	Echuca	
1909	Shepparton (undefeated)	Echuca	
1908	Shepparton	Tatura	
1907	Mooroopna	Shepparton	
1906	Shepparton		
1905	Tatura: 1st	Shepparton: 2nd	
1904	Tatura		
1903	Shepparton	Tatura	
1902	Tatura		
1901	Tatura	Kyabram	
1900	Tatura	Shepparton	
1899	1st: Shepparton	2nd: Tatura	
1898	1st: Tatura	2nd: Shepparton	
1897	GVDFA in recess > No football competition		
1896	1st: Mooroopna	2nd: Shepparton & Ramblers United	
1895	1st: Mooroopna (undefeated)	2nd: Shepparton	
1894	Mooroopna		
1893	Mooroopna	Shepparton Ramblers	
Year	Seniors	Reserves	Thirds

== Grand Finals ==
Senior Football

The GVFNL grand final has been held continuously at Deakin Reserve, Shepparton since 1957. Since 1992, the best player on the ground in the GVFNL grand final has been awarded the Wilfred Cox Medal.

Year	Premier	G	B	Pts	Runner Up	G	B	Pts	Best on Ground	Venue / Gate
2027										
2026	Echuca	21	15	141	Shepparton	8	12	60	Angus Byrne (E)	Shepparton / $
2025	Kyabram	13	14	92	Rochester	8	14	62	Mick Mattingly (K)	Shepparton / $
2024	Echuca	22	22	154	Shepparton	9	4	58	Cooper Willoughby (E)	Shepparton / $
2023	Echuca	15	13	103	Kyabram	9	13	67	Sam Willoughby (E)	Shepparton / $
2022	Echuca	11	12	78	Euroa	10	6	66	Roury Kirkby (E)	Shepparton / $66,861
2021	Only 11 rounds played & no finals series due to COVID-19									
	1st: Echuca	9 wins	2 losses	169%	2nd: Euroa	9 wins	2 losses	144%		
2020	GVFNL in recess due to COVID-19									
2019	Kyabram (undefeated)	10	14	74	Echuca	7	10	52	Jake Reeves (K)	Shepparton / $55,022
2018	Shepparton	9	9	63	Kyabram	8	13	61	Ashley Holland (S)	Shepparton / $55,019
2017	Kyabram (undefeated)	12	15	87	Shepparton	4	8	32	Jake Reeves (K)	Shepparton / $57,142
2016	Kyabram (undefeated)	10	5	65	Rochester	7	10	52	Rhys Clark (K)	Shepparton / $60,486
2015	Benalla	16	16	112	Kyabram	7	11	53	Joshua Marchbank (B)	Shepparton / $69,934
2014	Shepparton Swans	7	6	48	Benalla	5	15	45	Tyson Sidebottom (SS)	Shepparton / $75,366
2013	Kyabram	15	15	105	Shepparton United	7	12	54	Luke Morris (K)	Shepparton / $67,007
2012	Tatura	10	11	71	Seymour	5	13	43	Linc Wellington (T)	Shepparton / $70,000
2011	Shepparton United	11	12	78	Mooroopna	9	9	63	Nathan Gemmill (SU)	Shepparton / $80,000
2010	Shepparton United	12	12	84	Kyabram	8	12	60	Ryan Normington (SU)	Shepparton / $80,000
2009	Mansfield	16	12	108	Kyabram	13	9	87	Fraser Stevenson (M)	Shepparton / $66,763
2008	Rochester	15	9	99	Seymour	13	18	96	Paul Scanlon (S)	Shepparton / $63,909
2007	Seymour	18	9	117	Shepparton Swans	13	12	90	Paul Scanlon (Sm)	Shepparton / $46,272
2006	Seymour	12	6	78	Benalla	8	8	56	Tim Hooper (S)	Shepparton / $65,573
2005	Seymour	10	13	73	Euroa	9	8	62	Shane Clayton (E)	Shepparton / $60,268
2004	Mansfield	20	15	135	Tatura	11	9	74	Trent Hotton (M)	Shepparton / $47,848
2003	Tatura	18	14	122	Echuca	10	12	72	Travis Tamburro (T)	Shepparton / $44,467
2002	Echuca	11	14	80	Rochester	7	14	56	Brad Smith (E)	Shepparton / $43,672
2001	Echuca	14	15	99	Rochester	5	5	35	Kristan Height (E)	Shepparton / $40,862
2000	Shepparton	15	5	95	Shepparton United	9	14	68	Justin Crouch (SU)	Shepparton / $35,471
1999	Rochester	16	18	114	Shepparton United	10	13	73	Daryl O'Neill (R)	Shepparton / $33,728
1998	Tatura	21	14	140	Rochester	13	9	87	Andrew Reynoldson (T)	Shepparton / $33,464
1997	Echuca	16	5	101	Rochester	11	10	76	Chris Eddy (E)	Shepparton / $29,708
1996	Kyabram	18	13	121	Tatura	10	10	70	Tony McDonnell (K)	Shepparton / $34,521
1995	Tatura	23	13	151	Echuca	10	15	75	Gary Stevens (T)	Shepparton / $34,209
1994	Shepparton	22	14	146	Echuca	14	9	93	Rod MacPherson (S)	Shepparton / $25,000
1993	Shepparton	12	14	86	Rochester	12	12	84	Dean Strauch (S)	Shepparton / $30,581
1992	Rochester	9	6	60	Tatura	8	10	58	Robbie Miller (R)	Shepparton / $33,000
1992 onwards: Best on ground > Wilfred Cox Medal
1991	Seymour	14	18	102	Tongala	15	3	93		Shepparton / $29,000
1990	Euroa	18	13	121	Rochester	16	8	104		Shepparton / $27,383
1989	Shepparton United	14	10	94	Rochester	9	14	68		Shepparton / $24,988
1988	Shepparton United	13	23	101	Shepparton	10	11	71		Shepparton / $20,968
1987	Shepparton United	18	23	131	Echuca	14	7	91		Shepparton / $14,385
1986	Mooroopna	18	18	126	Shepparton United	17	8	110		Shepparton / $22,066
1985	Mooroopna	20	10	130	Shepparton United	15	13	103		Shepparton / $21,375
1984	Tongala	15	20	110	Shepparton United	10	11	71		Shepparton / $22,545
1983	Tongala	15	18	126	Lemnos	11	8	74		Shepparton / $17,395
1982	Seymour	18	18	126	Lemnos	9	11	65		Shepparton / $13,395
1981	Seymour	18	13	121	Shepparton	9	18	72		Shepparton / $9,881
1980	Shepparton United	17	18	120	Shepparton	12	15	87		Shepparton / $9,219
1979	Echuca	11	11	77	Seymour	10	11	71		Shepparton / $6,864
1978	Shepparton	20	19	139	Seymour	14	12	96		Shepparton / $8,067
1977	Echuca	11	11	77	Kyabram	11	14	80		Shepparton / $7,240
1976	Seymour	16	5	101	Echuca	10	20	80		Shepparton / $7,240
1975	Kyabram	14	12	96	Euroa	11	12	78		Shepparton / $6,903
1974	Shepparton United	15	16	106	Euroa	9	11	65		Shepparton / $4,079
1973	Shepparton	18	20	128	Kyabram	12	9	81		Shepparton / $2,600
1972	Shepparton	19	11	125	Euroa	11	8	74		Shepparton / $1,937
1971	Euroa	20	16	136	Lemnos	16	10	106		Shepparton / $1,950
1970	Lemnos	14	6	90	Kyabram	12	9	81		Shepparton / $2,150
1969	Shepparton	16	13	109	Lemnos	9	13	67		Shepparton / $1,705
1968	Shepparton	13	7	85	Lemnos	7	10	52		Shepparton / $1,800
1967	City United	17	12	114	Shepparton	11	14	80		Shepparton / $1,890
1966	Shepparton	10	9	69	Lemnos	2	23	35		Shepparton
1965	Shepparton	14	16	100	Kyabram	14	9	93		Shepparton
1964	Shepparton	17	11	113	Kyabram	8	4	52		Shepparton
1963	Shepparton	10	12	72	Kyabram	9	10	64		Shepparton
1962	City United	13	13	91	Mooroopna	3	8	26		Shepparton
1961	Tongala	11	12	78	Shepparton	9	11	65		Shepparton
1960	Lemnos	10	19	79	Nagambie	8	17	65		Shepparton
1959	Lemnos	16	13	109	Kyabram	9	16	70		Shepparton
1958	Kyabram	12	13	85	Nagambie	9	6	60		Shepparton
1957	Shepparton	12	10	82	Tatura	12	8	80		Deakin Reserve
1956	City United	7	14	56	Mooroopna	8	6	54		
1955	City United	8	10	58	Mooroopna	2	9	21		Tatura / £800
1954	City United	9	16	70	Tatura	10	7	67		Tatura / £880
1953	Tatura (G Final replay)	7	2	44	City United	3	7	25		Tatura / £677
1953	Tatura (drawn G Final)	6	13	49	City United	7	7	49		Tatura / £989
1952	Tatura	16	12	108	City United	8	18	66		Tatura /£990
1951	Shepparton	14	10	94	Tatura	10	11	71		Tatura / £915
1950	Kyabram	17	8	110	City United	7	14	56		Tatura / £675
1949	Tongala	10	19	79	Kyabram	6	13	49		Tatura / £390
1948	Kyabram	16	16	112	Tatura	14	9	93		Tatura / £283
1947	Nagambie	9	8	62	Kyabram	9	7	61		Tatura / £272
1946	Nagambie	20	13	133	Army Camp 13	14	16	100		Tatura / £210
1941-45	In recess > WW2									
1940	Benalla	15	16	106	Rushworth	11	16	82		Avenel
1939	Nagambie	10	10	70	Rushworth	9	11	65		Murchison
1938	Mooroopna	18	19	127	Shepparton	8	13	61		Tatura / £110
1937	Mooroopna	12	14	86	Rushworth	8	10	58		Shepparton
1936	Mooroopna	13	7	85	Murchison	7	6	48		Rushworth / £134
1935	Rushworth	12	9	81	Shepparton	7	8	50		Murchison / £95
1934	Shepparton	11	19	85	Rushworth	7	14	56		Tatura / £127
1933	Rushworth	11	10	76	Shepparton	10	7	67		Tatura / £
1932	Rushworth	10	18	78	Mooroopna	4	11	35		Shepparton / £121
1931	Rushworth	11	16	82	Mooroopna	9	14	68		Tatura / £113
1930	Rushworth	10	14	74	Murchison	10	11	71		Tatura / £120
1929	Shepparton	17	13	115	Rushworth	11	14	80		Tatura / £216
1928	Kyabram	17	21	123	Shepparton	14	7	91		Tatura /
1927	Kyabram	10	10	70	Shepparton	8	10	58		Tatura / £260
1926	Kyabram	14	13	97	Mooroopna	10	5	65		Tatura
1925	Shepparton	9	15	69	Kyabram	4	9	31		Tatura / £202
1924	Mooroopna	12	15	87	Tatura	11	7	73		Shepparton / £147
1923	Mooroopna	6	5	41	Tatura	3	11	29		Kyabram / £83
1922	Kyabram	8	14	62	Shepparton	6	15	51		Rushworth / £115
1921	Kyabram	7	10	52	Tatura	5	12	42		Mooroopna / £145
1920	Shepparton	11	12	78	Murchison	6	13	49		Mooroopna / £90
1919	Kyabram	5	11	41	Tatura	5	6	36		Murchison
1915-18	In recess > WW1									
1914	Rochester	8	8	56	Shepparton	7	7	49		Tatura / £55
1913	Shepparton	7	16	58	Rochester	7	10	52		Echuca
1912	Shepparton (undefeated)	11	22	88	Murchison	7	6	48		Tatura / £84
1911	Shepparton	10	6	66	Echuca	4	21	45		Tatura / £89
1910	Murchison	13	9	87	Echuca	3	7	25		Tatura / £73
1909	1st: Shepparton (undefeated)				2nd: Echuca					No grand final?
1908	Shepparton	9	6	90	Tatura	3	4	22		Kyabram
1907	1st: Mooroopna				2nd: Shepparton					No grand final?
1906	Shepparton									No grand final?
1905	1st: Tatura				2nd: Shepparton					No grand final
1904	Tatura	6	6	42	Shepparton	0	12	12		Mooroopna / £42
1903	Shepparton	4	9	33	Tatura	2	5	17		Shepparton / £38
1902	1st: Mooroopna									No grand final
1901	Tatura	6	7	43	Kyabram	1	1	7		Shepparton
1900	Tatura									
1899	Shepparton									
1898	Tatura									
1897	GVDFA in recess									
1896	Mooroopna									
1895	1st: Mooroopna (undefeated)				2nd: Shepparton &					
					2nd: Tatura					
1894	Mooroopna									
1893	Mooroopna				Shepparton Ramblers					£11
Year	Premier	G	B	Pts	Runner Up	G	B	Pts	Best on Ground	Venue / Gate

== Medal winners / Leading Goalkickers ==
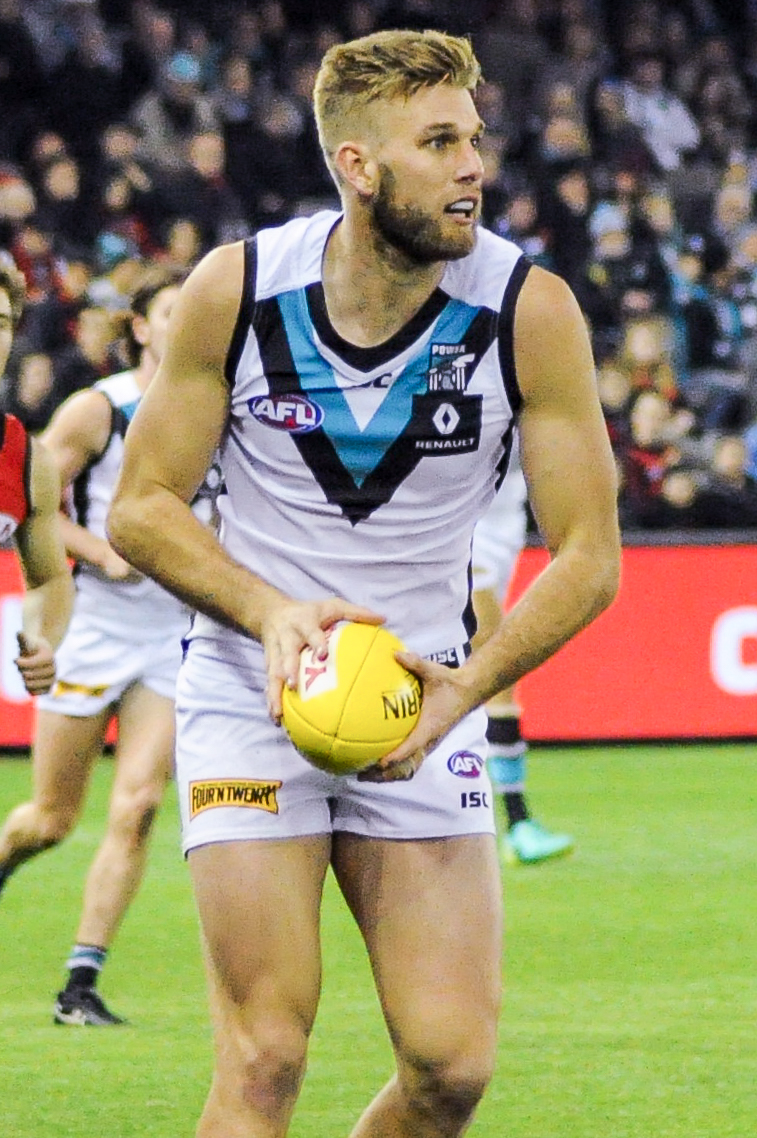
Jackson_Trengove

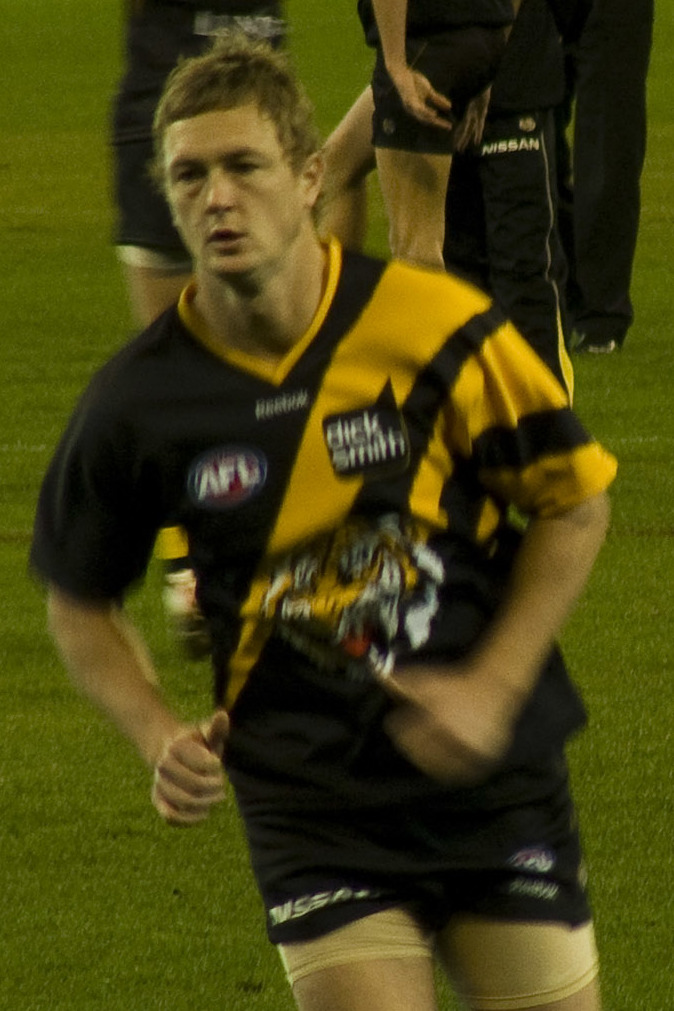
Kayne Petifer

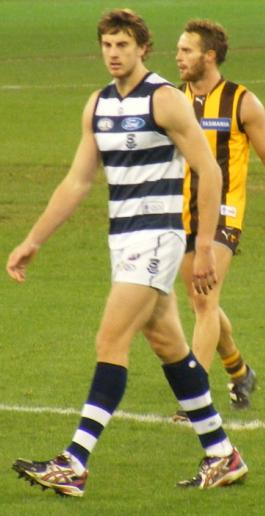
Mark Blake

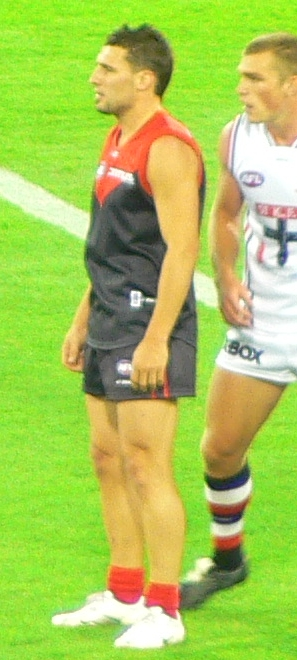
Russell Robertson

=== Senior Football ===
Morrison Medal

The GVFNL senior football best and fairest award is voted on by the GVFNL's match day umpires in the form of three, two and one votes awarded to the best three players in each match of the round.

The Morrison Medal was first awarded in 1934 and is named after Donald Clive Morrison, who was a local solicitor and was President of the GVDFA / GVFL from 1902 until 1931.

GVFNL	Best & Fairest (Morrison Medal)			Leading Goalkicker		
Year	Player	Club	Votes	Player	Club	Goals
2027						
2026	Ashley Holland	Shepparton	24	Matthew Casey	Shepparton United	60
2025	Callum Brown	Mansfield	20	Hugh Hamilton	Rochester	69
2024	Ashley Holland	Shepparton	25	Riley Mason	Seymour	72
2023	Jack O'Sullivan	Seymour	28	Jackson Trengove	Mooroopna	55 (59)
2022	Ben Rigoni	Seymour	22	Chris Nield	Mooroopna	77 (82)
2021	Jack O'Sullivan	Seymour	22	Kyle Mueller	Kyabram	34
2020	GVFNL in recess >	COVID-19				-
2019	Michael Mattingley	Kyabram	19	Kyle Mueller	Kyabram	66 (75)
2018	Nik Rokahr	Shepparton		Kayne Pettifer	Kyabram	100(106)
2017	Simon Buckley	Echuca	20	Kayne Pettifer	Kyabram	88 (93)
2016	Simon Buckley	Echuca	20	Kayne Pettifer	Kyabram	81 (84)
2015	Ashley Watson	Rochester	25	Joshua Mellington	Benalla	95(111)
2014	Will Martinello	Benalla	22	Grant Weeks	Rochester	103
2013	Luke Morgan	Benalla	32	1st: Saad Saad; 2nd: Jason Eagle	Seymour; Shepparton United	102 94(112)
2012	Mark Blake	Mooroopna	25	Saad Saad	Seymour	117
2011	Guy Campbell	Rochester	25	Damien Yze	Mooroopna	74 (88)
2010	Kristan Height	Echuca	30	Russell Robertson	Shepparton Swans	106
2009	Brian Durbridge	Shepparton Swans	19	Saad Saad	Seymour	89
2008	Lincoln Withers; Rowan Priest	Kyabram; Benalla	19	Mark Jansz	Euroa	103
2007	Trent Hotton	Mansfield		Saad Saad	Seymour	96
2006	Colin Durie	Echuca		Balraj Singh	Mooroopna	92
2005	Matt Byers	Shepparton		Ricky Symes	Benalla	103
2004	Shane Schottner	Seymour		Damien Yze	Shepparton Swans	78
2003	Rhys Archard; Stephen Ash	Echuca; Shepparton		Damien Yze	Shepparton Swans	124
2002	Jarrod Sutherland	Shepparton Swans	27	Brenton Cooper	Benalla	90
2001	Craig Sholl	Echuca	32	Jason Wells	Shepparton	87
2000	Stephen Ash	Shepparton	25	Anthony Mellington	Shepparton	119
1999	Tony Pasquali	Benalla		Adrian Baker	Euroa	109
1998	Adam Baker; Adam Brunt	Euroa; Tongala	17	Adrian Baker	Euroa	105
1997	Stephen Orr	Echuca		Brenton Cooper	Shepparton United	128
1996	Mark Lambourn	Lemnos	23	Steve Ryan	Tatura	119
1995	Ty Esler; Simon Eishold	Tatura; Echuca		1st: Daryl Taylor; 2nd: Chris Stuhldreier	Lemnos; Kyabram	109; 108
1994	Phillip Morgan	Rochester		Chris Stuhldreier	Kyabram	116
1993	Benny Gugliotti	Kyabram		Chris Stuhldreier	Kyabram	164(170)
1992	Peter Foott	Shepparton United		Chris Stuhldreier	Kyabram	142
1991	Brendan Parker	Tongala		Chris Stuhldreier	Kyabram	112
1990	Russell Byrnes	Tongala		1st: Paul O'Bree; 2nd: Chris Stuhldreier	Euroa; Kyabram	106; 105
1989	Jonathan Solomon	Seymour		Mick Souter	Tongala	78
1988	Mick Keenan	Rochester		Ken Murray	Shepparton	102
1987	Peter Gittos	Kyabram		Darren Comi	Shepparton	96
1986	Brian Kennaugh	Echuca		Perry Meka	Lemnos	97
1985	Gary Cooper	Mooroopna		Ken Murray	Lemnos	126
1984	John Williams	Shepparton United		Shane Loveless	Tatura	100
1983	Gary Cooper	Mooroopna		Darren Comi	Seymour	86
1982	Phil Harrison; Gary Reese	Tongala; Shepparton		Paul McCarty	Mooroopna	77
1981	David Code	Shepparton		Peter Fuller	Rochester	57
1980	David Code	Shepparton		Peter Fuller	Rochester	87
1979	Barry Ough	Mooroopna		Gary Elliott	Lemnos	89
1978	Greg Liddell	Seymour		Ray Stomann	Seymour	91
1977	Gavin Saunders	Mooroopna		Neville Mills	Euroa	81
1976	Gary Cooper	Tatura		Robert Downie	Tatura	87
1975	Norm Smith	Lemnos	29	Neville Mills	Euroa	107
1974	Norm Smith	Tatura		Trevor Eddy	Shepparton United	114
1973	Dowie Bux	Mooroopna		Trevor Eddy	Shepparton United	125
1972	Dowie Bux	Mooroopna		Daryl Twitt	Shepparton	62
1971	Chris Hutchins	Shepparton		Vin Edwards	Euroa	63
1970	Jack Greenwood	Tatura		Daryl Twitt	Shepparton	83
1969	Jack Greenwood	Tatura		Ron Cobbledick	Lemnos	76
1968	Ray Willett	Mooroopna		Terry Mangles	Mooroopna	55
1967	Ray Willett	Mooroopna		Greg Riddell	Tongala	68
1966	Ed Murray	Stanhope	20	Freddo McMahon	Tatura	63
1965	Ray Willett	Mooroopna	19	Jock Spencer	Shepparton United	61
1964	Dick Clay	Kyabram	?	Dick Clay	Kyabram	104 (116)
1963	Charlie Stewart	Kyabram	24	Jock Spencer	City United	71
1962	Barry McCarty	Mooroopna	25	Kevin Fruend	Tatura	59
1961	Jeff Cooper	Kyabram	20	Ron Files	Tongala	59
1960	John Dalgliesh	Shepparton	21	Stewart Florence	Rushworth	64
1959	Robbie Orrman	Lemnos	23	John Dainton	City United	78
1958	Jeff Cooper	Kyabram	25	John Dainton	City United	78
1957	Linsday Turnbull	Rushworth	27	Joe Forster	Tatura	75 (77)
1956	Ken Shaw	Nagambie	19	Alan Pickering	Nagambie	68
1955	Con O'Toole	Rushworth	19	Alan Pickering	Nagambie	64
1954	Robbie Orrman	Lemnos	28	Tom Alexander	Tatura	82
1953	William "Bill" Cruz	Rushworth	23	Ben Chilcott	Shepparton	86
1952	Roy Barrett	Stanhope/Girgarre	29	Stan Finn	Lemnos	84
1951	Robbie Orrman	Lemnos	31	Doug Brown	Tatura	86 (96)
1950	Robert "Bob" Dawson	Tongala	19&1/2	Ian Greening	Kyabram	113(118)
1949	Bill Tyquin	Lemnos	37	Joe Purdey	Tongala	69
1948	Keith "Snowy" Dunstall; Gerry Sexton	Stanhope/Girgarre; Rushworth	20	Arnold Mitchell	Kyabram	
1947	William Pritchard	Tatura	27	Arnold Mitchell	Kyabram	51 (53)
1946	Aub Downing	Stanhope	31			
1941-45	GVFNL in recess >	WW2				-
1940	Cecil Froelich	Seymour	?			
1939	Keith Kane	Rushworth	?			
1938	Keith Kane	Rushworth	32	R Wright	Shepparton	38
1937	Eric "Bub" James	Shepparton	23	Norman Starritt	Mooroopna	66
1936	Leo Dwyer	Murchison	22	Norman Starritt	Mooroopna	66
1935	Eric "Bub" James	Shepparton	15	Norman Starritt	Tatura	60 (64)
1934	Wilfred Cox	Kyabram	21	Norman Starritt	Mooroopna	44
1933				T Maher	Shepparton	54
1932				Clyde Hill	Mooroopna	?
1931				M Doyle	Mooroopna	41 (49)
1930						
1929				Charles Heavey	Shepparton	87
1928				Jack Walsh	Shepparton	53
1927				Roy Outram	Kyabram	46
1926				Clyde Hill	Mooroopna	46
1925				Clyde Hill	Mooroopna	41
1913				J Grahame		56
1895				Lindsay	Mooroopna	?
1893				McLennan	Kyabram	17

- () - Brackets tally includes goals kicked in finals.

=== Reserves Football ===
Abikair Medal

Thr GVFL Reserves football competition commenced in 1948, but there was no best and fairest award handed out until 1954. Henry "Roots" Abikair, who was of Lebanese descent and hailed from Rushworth and was the oldest of six brothers who all played for the local Rushworth Football Club. Henry played in four GVFL premierships with Rushworth FC in the 1930's and was the original donor of this award in 1954.

Season	RESERVES Best & Fairest	Club	Votes	Leading goal-kicker	Club	Goals
1948-53	No B & F award					
1954	Ian Sutton	Nagambie	18			
1955	Lou James	Shepparton	13			
1956	Harry Garthwaite	Mooroopna	16			
1957	Ron Woods	City United	19			
1958	Bill Murphy	City United	18			
1959	Les Freer	Mooroopna	22			
1960	Harry Brittain	City United	17			
1961	Roy Payne	Lemnos	19			
1962	Ross French	Tongala	11			
	Terry Joyce	Lemnos	11			
	J Pinner	Mooroopna	11			
1963	John Burrows	Stanhope	14			
	Len Cummins	Lemnos	14			
	Graeme Scott	Shepparton	14			
1964	Frank Foster &	Lemnos	17			
	Dave Bates	Kyabram	17			
1965	Leo Connally	Tongala	22			
1966	Phil Parrett	Lemnos	21			
1967	I Kelly	Mooroopna				
1968	J Jennessey	Shepparton				
1969	Max Murley	Kyabram				
1970	Graeme Young	Mooroopna				
1971	Max Murley	Kyabram				
1972	Max Murley	Kyabram				
1973	Max Murley	Kyabram				
1974	Peter Cocks	Echuca				
1975	A Dell	Shepparton				
1976	Noel Cocks	Tongala				
1977	Vin Edwards	Euroa				
1978	K Parker	Tongala				
1979	John Brain	Lemnos	19			
1980	Stuart Freeman	Mooroopna				
1981	Peter Ryan	Tatura				
1982	K Roberts	Seymour				
1983	Mick Fazzolari &	Lemnos	15			
	Peter Spriggs	Shepparton United	15			
1984	Ian Petherick	Tongala				
1985	Mick Fazzolari	Shepparton				
1986	Wayne Garner	Shepparton				
1987	Francis Lee	Rochester				
1988	D McLennan	Tatura				
1989	Kevin Hicks	Shepparton United				
1990	David Collins	Rochester				
1991	Greg Liddell	Seymour				
1992	Andrew Elliott	Seymour				
1993	Phil Tucker	Tongala				
1994	Paul Gray	Echuca				
	Leon McLeod	Shepparton				
	Peter Ryan	Tatura				
1995	Eric Egan	Lemnos	26			
1996	Peter Lear	Kyabram				
1997	Simon Reid	Echuca				
1998	Peter Warnock	Benalla				
1999	J Chapman	Kyabram				
2000	Steve Kerwins	Kyabram				
2001	Craig McIntyre	Shepparton	15			
2002	Christian Thompson	Mansfield				
2003	Graeme Talarico	Tatura				
2004	Rob Buchanan	Mansfield				
	Nathan Whipp	Rochester				
2005	Glen Archer	Shepparton				
2006	John Rudd	Seymour				
2007	Chris Dube	Benalla				
2008	Terence Tuohey	Shepparton	27			
2009	Terence Tuohey	Shepparton	27			
2010	Shane Hughan	Mooroopna	22	Adrian Meka	Shepparton Swans	43 (45)
2011	Chris Dube	Benalla	26	Jacob Lloyd	Tatura	59 (65)
2012	Brodie Montague	Rochester	15	Shane Hughan	Mooroopna	62 (69)
2013	Tom Scott	Tom Scott	21	Sam Frawley	Rochester	76 (79)
2014	Brodie Jacques	Shepparton	27	Anthony Tautala	Shepparton Swans	33 (35)
2015	Stephen Scott	Shepparton United	18	D Schaper &	Mooroopna	39 (41)
				Jesse Thelen	Seymour	39 (46)
2016	Ben Pedretti	Shepparton United	21	Heath Barnett	Kyabram	70 (74)
2017	Tom McCluskey	Shepparton United	19	Jesse Moran	Rochester	69 (71)
2018	Sam Frawley &	Rochester	18	Mackenzie Ryan	Kyabram	57 (61)
	Mitchell Heggart	Shepparton	18			
2019	Robert Osborne	Shepparton Swans	24	Max Jones	Seymour	52 (57)
2020	GVFNL in recess >	COVID-19				
2021	Sean Dillon &	Kyabram	14	Jack Tenace	Echuca	36
	Ben Kennedy	Tatura	14			
2022	Craig Bamford	Euroa	18	Max Jones	Seymour	65 (70)
2023	Nic Denahy	Kyabram	21	Robert Wilson	Euroa	58 (61)
2024	Rowan Hiscock	Shepparton	20	Julian Morgan	Seymour	52 (56)
2025	Thomas Magee	Shepparton Swans	20	Jack Radford	Seymour	69 (73)
2026	Kobyn James	Echuca	27	Jack Radford	Seymour	67 (70)
2027						
Season	RESERVES Best & Fairest	Club	Votes	Leading goal-kicker	Club	Goals

- ( ) - Figures in brackets includes goals kicked in finals.

=== Thirds Football ===
Pattison Medal

Albert "Bert" Alexander Lyle Pattison (OAM - 1981) was a former Stanhope footballer and coach. Pattison later served as a GVFL club delegate for 29 years and seven years as Vice President of the GVFL.

Season	THIRDS Best & Fairest	Club	Votes	Leading goal-kicker	Club	Goals
1962	F Fanning	Kyabram	21			
1963						
1964	Alan Gale	Tatura	25			
1965	Alan Gale	Tatura	30			
1966	Paul Rowlands	Kyabram	28			
1967	John Heuston	Shepparton United				
1968	Ian McDonald	Lemnos	30			
1969	Des James	Lemnos	24			
1970	Graeme Mills	Shepparton				
1971	Geoff Preston	Lemnos	28			
1972	Alan Kellett	Lemnos	22			
1973	Alan Preston	Lemnos	40			
1974	Leigh Hensen	Echuca				
1975	Mimo Lia	Lemnos	27			
1976	P Pearson	Rochester				
1977	I Williamson	Shepparton				
1978	M Charles &	Mooroopna				
	Michael Fry	Kyabram				
1979	Michael Rolfe	Echuca				
1980	Peter Goggin	Lemnos	26			
	Ross Normington	Kyabram	26			
	Steven Waters	Echuca	26			
1981	Des Hicks	Shepparton United				
1982	Kevin Hicks	Shepparton United				
1983	Dene Archer &	Tatura	21			
	Blair Wilson	Lemnos	21			
1984	Howard Bux	Shepparton United				
1985	Rocco Bagnato	Tatura				
1986	Tony Pellegrino	Shepparton				
1987	Michael Gardiner	Seymour				
1988	Michael Kilmartin	Tatura				
1989	Dean Bates	Mooroopna				
1990	Adam Houlihan	Kyabram				
1991	Glenn Hart	Shepparton United				
1992	B Speers; A Trimbly	Rochester; Kyabram				
1993	Jason Rachelle; A West	Lemnos; Kyabram	22			
1994	Michael Portia	Kyabram				
1995	Ben Parker	Lemnos	25			
1996	John Rudd	Seymour				
1997	Luke Shay	Shepparton United				
1998	Matthew Vasey	Shepparton United				
1999	Luke Simpson	Shepparton Swans				
2000	Hayden Buckley	Euroa				
2001	Tim Richter	Shepparton United				
2002	Ricky Joyce	Benalla				
2003	Luke Kennelly	Shepparton				
2004	Jay Spizzica	Rochester				
2005	Jason Limbrick	Shepparton				
2006	Brett Mahoney	Mansfield				
2007	Dave Ferrier; Alec Young	Echuca; Kyabram				
2008	Jason Cole	Seymour	22			
2009	Scott Oakley	Rochester	29			
2010	Matt DiBella	Shepparton United	21	Nick Warnock	Benalla	58 (67)
2011	Jack Egan	Mansfield	18	Ben Ryan	Shepparton	59 (65)
2012	Hayden Gemmill	Kyabram	25	James Lloyd	Shepparton	50 (61)
2013	Zac Gleeson	Euroa	20	Matthew Ryan	Kyabram	40 (58)
2014	Cody Tancred	Mooroopna	17	Robert Staff	Euroa	57 (61)
2015	Matthew Palmer	Rochester	22	Ben McDonnell	Kyabram	44 (52)
2016	Brayden Frost	Euroa	16	Ben McDonnell	Kyabram	37 (38)
2017	Jordan McGregor	Shepparton	23	Jak Trewin	Shepparton	51 (55)
2018	Zac Alderton; Hugo Ingham	Shepparton; Shepparton Swans	23	Ethan Palma-Ludeman	Kyabram	49 (51)
2019	Mitchell Gugliotti	Kyabram	25	Will Rohde	Shepparton	47 (48)
2020	GVFNL in recess >	COVID-19				
2021	Bradley Simpson	Echuca	13	James Auld	Shepparton Swans	21
2022	Angus Murray	Seymour	25	Flynn Tonks	Shepparton Swans	49 (53)
2023	Mason Reeves	Shepparton Swans	19	Tobie Woodfine	Rochester	47
2024	Jensen Dowling	Shepparton	26	Tobie Woodfine	Rochester	81
2025	Noah Muir	Shepparton	25	Adam Storer	Mansfield	55 (56)
2026				Riley Myers	Shepparton	63
2027						

- () - Brackets tally includes goals kicked in finals.

== Office Bearers ==
Year	President	Secretary	Treasurer
1893	Mr Lewis	G W Maxwell	
1894	Dr Florance	Mr Gourlay	T Campbell
1895	Dr Florance	G W Maxwell	Mr Welchman
1896	Mr Bartlett	F Hoyle	C Wood
1897	GVDFA in recess		
1898	Dr Florance	Geo McKenzie	J W Barrett
1899	T Bazeley	George McKenzie	
1900	M Twomey	Mr Teare	Mr Heath
1901	P Kirwan	P Hanley	
1902-14	D C Morrison	T C Lupton	
1915-18	In recess > WW1		
1919	D C Morrison	W T Maher	
1920	D C Morrison	M J Harford	
1921-31	D C Morrison	S O'Toole	J J Hanlon
1932-36	Jack JR Hanlon	S O'Toole	
1937-38	W J Wilson	S O'Toole	
1939-40	Tom Hastie	W J Wilson	
1941-45	In recess > WW2		
1946-56	Tom Hastie	G E Dowell	
1957-64	Tom Hastie	J H Trevaskis	
1965-73	F J Jack Arthur	J H Trevaskis	
1974-75	F J Jack Arthur	K J Hodgkinson	
1976	F J Jack Arthur	R J Manley	
1977	F J Jack Arthur	Keith Wellman	
1978	Bill Enders	Keith Wellman	
1978-83	Alan Sutherland	Keith Wellman	
		General Manager	
1984-95	Barry Connolly	Keith Wellman	
	Chairman		
1996-97	Barry Connolly	Keith Wellman	
1997	Barry Connolly	Brendan Ryan	
1997-02	Barry Connolly	Eric Bott	
2003-07	Ian Fitzsimmons	Eric Bott	
2008	John Coghlan	Keith Wellman	
2009-10	Ian McDonald	Keith Wellman	
2010-12	Robert Bell	Keith Wellman	
2012-14	Trevor Pollard	Keith Wellman	
2015-22	David Roff	AFL Goulburn Murray	
2023	Jacqui Hudgson	Brad Noonan	

== GVFNL Netball ==
The A. and B. Grade netball competitions commenced in 1981, with the B. Reserve commencing in 1994.

The 17 and under competition commenced in 2003 and the 15 and under competition started in 2018.

== 2007 Ladder ==
Goulburn Valley FL	Wins	Byes	Losses	Draws	For	Against	%	Pts
S United	15	0	3	0	2010	1352	148.67%	60
Seymour	14	0	4	0	2446	1533	159.56%	56
S Swans	13	0	5	0	2037	1430	142.45%	52
Euroa	12	0	6	0	2134	1681	126.95%	48
Mansfield	12	0	6	0	1758	1538	114.30%	48
Echuca	11	0	7	0	1877	1386	135.43%	44
Rochester	8	0	10	0	1749	1821	96.05%	32
Mooroopna	8	0	10	0	1782	1919	92.86%	32
Shepparton	6	0	12	0	1681	2045	82.20%	24
Benalla	6	0	12	0	1635	2003	81.63%	24
Kyabram	2	0	16	0	1409	2267	62.15%	8
Tatura	1	0	17	0	942	2485	37.91%	4

FINALS

Final	Team	G	B	Pts	Team	G	B	Pts
Elimination	Mansfield	24	20	164	Euroa	14	7	91
Elimination	S Swans	27	9	171	Echuca	10	12	72
Qualifying	Seymour	20	13	133	S United	12	10	82
1st Semi	S United	18	11	119	Mansfield	13	13	91
2nd Semi	Seymour	11	15	81	S Swans	10	10	70
Preliminary	S Swans	14	18	102	S United	8	7	55
Grand	Seymour	18	9	117	S Swans	13	12	90

== 2008 Ladder ==
Goulburn Valley FL	Wins	Byes	Losses	Draws	For	Against	%	Pts
Seymour	16	0	2	0	2402	1330	180.60%	64
Mooroopna	15	0	3	0	2049	1263	162.23%	60
Rochester	14	0	4	0	2117	1535	137.92%	56
S Swans	12	0	6	0	1910	1571	121.58%	48
Kyabram	11	0	7	0	1982	1521	130.31%	44
Echuca	8	0	10	0	1617	1729	93.52%	32
Mansfield	8	0	10	0	1600	1736	92.17%	32
Euroa	7	0	11	0	1987	1846	107.64%	28
S United	7	0	11	0	1458	1664	87.62%	28
Benalla	6	0	12	0	1493	1829	81.63%	24
Shepparton	4	0	14	0	1510	2173	69.49%	16
Tatura	0	0	18	0	901	2829	31.85%	0

FINALS

Final	Team	G	B	Pts	Team	G	B	Pts
Elimination	S Swans	19	14	128	Kyabram	11	14	80
Elimination	Rochester	14	20	104	Echuca	8	15	63
Qualifying	Seymour	18	10	118	Mooroopna	13	9	87
1st Semi	Mooroopna	18	20	128	S Swans	12	11	83
2nd Semi	Seymour	15	13	103	Rochester	13	10	88
Preliminary	Rochester	19	10	124	Mooroopna	13	16	94
Grand	Rochester	15	9	99	Seymour	13	18	96

== 2009 Ladder ==
Goulburn Valley FL	Wins	Byes	Losses	Draws	For	Against	%	Pts
Rochester	16	0	2	0	2154	1102	195.46%	64
Mansfield	14	0	4	0	2290	1387	165.10%	56
Kyabram	14	0	4	0	2041	1391	146.73%	56
Tatura	12	0	6	0	2134	1595	133.79%	48
Seymour	9	0	9	0	1952	1598	122.15%	36
Mooroopna	11	0	7	0	1739	1593	109.17%	44
Shepparton	8	0	10	0	1652	1805	91.52%	32
Euroa	7	0	11	0	1432	2188	65.45%	28
Echuca	6	0	12	0	1457	1908	76.36%	24
S Swans	5	0	13	0	1552	2082	74.54%	20
S United	5	0	13	0	1361	1876	72.55%	20
Benalla	1	0	17	0	1179	2418	48.76%	4

FINALS

Final	Team	G	B	Pts	Team	G	B	Pts
Elimination	Tatura	14	21	105	Mooroopna	9	16	70
Elimination	Kyabram	21	22	148	Seymour	15	6	96
Qualifying	Mansfield	15	12	102	Rochester	14	4	88
1st Semi	Rochester	20	14	134	Tatura	8	12	60
2nd Semi	Kyabram	21	12	138	Mansfield	12	15	87
Preliminary	Mansfield	14	22	106	Rochester	7	5	47
Grand	Mansfield	16	12	108	Kyabram	13	9	87

== 2010 Ladder ==
Goulburn Valley FL	Wins	Byes	Losses	Draws	For	Against	%	Pts
Kyabram	15	0	3	0	2299	1416	162.36%	60
Echuca	15	0	3	0	2169	1422	152.53%	60
Shepparton United	14	0	4	0	1895	1207	157.00%	56
Mooroopna	14	0	4	0	2123	1429	148.57%	56
Shepparton Swans	11	0	7	0	2137	1843	115.95%	44
Mansfield	9	0	8	1	1753	1703	102.94%	38
Rochester	9	0	9	0	1775	1664	106.67%	36
Tatura	7	0	10	1	1711	1878	91.11%	30
Seymour	7	0	11	0	1635	1855	88.14%	28
Benalla	4	0	14	0	1471	2044	71.97%	16
Euroa	2	0	16	0	1175	2627	44.73%	8
Shepparton	0	0	18	0	1216	2271	53.54%	0

FINALS

Final	Team	G	B	Pts	Team	G	B	Pts
Elimination	Shepparton United	22	11	143	Mansfield	6	6	42
Elimination	Mooroopna	10	14	74	Shepparton Swans	9	22	76
Qualifying	Kyabram	12	9	81	Echuca	4	9	33
1st Semi	Echuca	20	10	130	Shepparton Swans	13	10	88
2nd Semi	Shepparton United	17	13	115	Kyabram	10	13	73
Preliminary	Kyabram	12	18	90	Echuca	10	11	71
Grand	Shepparton United	12	12	84	Kyabram	8	12	60

== 2011 Ladder ==
Goulburn Valley FL	Wins	Byes	Losses	Draws	For	Against	%	Pts
Shepparton United	15	0	2	1	1957	1038	188.54%	62
Echuca	14	0	4	0	1942	1269	153.03%	56
Mooroopna	14	0	4	0	1811	1289	140.50%	56
Rochester	12	0	5	1	1586	1288	123.14%	50
Tatura	10	0	6	2	1783	1453	122.71%	44
Kyabram	11	0	7	0	1649	1474	111.87%	44
Mansfield	9	0	9	0	1625	1485	109.43%	36
Benalla	8	0	10	0	1430	1646	86.88%	32
Shepparton	6	0	12	0	1360	1817	74.85%	24
Seymour	3	0	14	1	1284	1758	73.04%	14
Shepparton Swans	2	0	16	0	1393	2156	64.61%	8
Euroa	1	0	16	1	1119	2266	49.38%	6

FINALS

Final	Team	G	B	Pts	Team	G	B	Pts
Elimination	Tatura	12	25	97	Tatura	5	7	37
Elimination	Kyabram	16	19	115	Rochester	13	13	91
Qualifying	Shepparton United	11	6	72	Echuca	10	8	68
1st Semi	Echuca	22	9	141	Kyabram	11	8	74
2nd Semi	Shepparton United	12	22	94	Mooroopna	8	8	56
Preliminary	Mooroopna	18	10	118	Echuca	13	14	92
Grand	Shepparton United	11	12	78	Mooroopna	9	9	63

== 2012 Ladder ==
Goulburn Valley FL	Wins	Byes	Losses	Draws	For	Against	%	Pts
Tatura	16	0	2	0	1998	996	200.60%	64
Rochester	14	0	3	1	1903	1257	151.39%	58
Shepparton United	14	0	4	0	1680	1099	152.87%	56
Mooroopna	13	0	5	0	2079	1286	161.66%	52
Mansfield	11	0	7	0	1641	1339	122.55%	44
Seymour	9	0	9	0	1852	1518	122.00%	36
Kyabram	8	0	9	1	1401	1739	80.56%	34
Echuca	7	0	11	0	1555	1791	86.82%	28
Shepparton	7	0	11	0	1419	1960	72.40%	28
Shepparton Swans	4	0	14	0	1342	1736	77.30%	16
Euroa	2	0	16	0	1232	2061	59.78%	8
Benalla	2	0	16	0	982	2302	42.66%	8

FINALS

Final	Team	G	B	Pts	Team	G	B	Pts
Elimination	Mooroopna	16	9	105	Mooroopna	14	12	96
Elimination	Shepparton United	15	10	100	Mansfield	11	6	72
Qualifying	Tatura	21	17	143	Rochester	9	3	57
1st Semi	Seymour	17	12	114	Rochester	6	11	47
2nd Semi	Tatura	13	7	85	Shepparton United	10	7	67
Preliminary	Seymour	16	14	110	Shepparton United	11	8	74
Grand	Tatura	10	11	71	Seymour	5	13	43
