= Tebble =

Tebble is a surname. Notable people with the surname include:

- Bill Tebble (1928–2004), Australian rules footballer
- Norman Tebble (1924–1998), British marine biologist
- Pat Tebble (1903–1968), Australian rules footballer

== See also ==
- Tebbe
