= Joseph Hammond =

Joseph Hammond may refer to:

- Joseph Ashitey Hammond, Ghanaian veteran and fundraiser during the COVID-19 pandemic
- Joseph Joel Hammond, New Zealand aviator
- Joe Hammond, Australian rules footballer
- Joe Hammond (basketball), streetball basketball player
- Joey Hammond, American baseball coach and player
