= Broadford Football Netball Club =

Sports club in Victoria, Australia

Broadford FNC

Names
- Full name: Broadford Football Netball Club
- Nickname: Roos

Club details
- Founded: 1884; 142 years ago
- Colours
- Competition: Bendigo Football League
- Premierships: (21): 1904, 1909, 1911, 1913, 1919, 1924, 1925, 1926, 1927, 1929, 1930, 1945, 1946, 1949, 1971, 1972, 1973, 1974, 1981, 1984, 1996.
- Ground: Central Park / Harley Hammond Reserve

Uniforms
Home

Other information
- Official website: Broadford FNC website

The Broadford Football Netball Club, nicknamed the Roos, is an Australian rules football and netball club and located 88 km north of Melbourne in the town of Broadford and is affiliated with the Bendigo Football League.

== History ==
It appears that Australian Rules football first took place in Broadford in August 1884 when the Broadford Football Club played a match against Tallarook.

In 1906, the Broadford Junior Football Club was formed and played in the Central Mernda Football Association.

Broadford moved from the Waranga North East Football Association (WNEFA) to the Hume Highway Football Association in 1939, which ultimately caused the WNEFA to fold.

Broadford FC wore a black guernsey, with a red sash up until 1977, when it joined the Riddell District Football League and was forced to change its guernsey colours to a royal blue and white stripes design, as existing RDFL club, Riddell Football Club already wore the black and red guernsey.

On 17 September 2019, at the third and final Special General meeting, 52 eligible members cast their vote opting for Outer East Football Netball League (47) as their home of choice over the Riddell District Football League (5).

In round five of the 2022 Outer East Football Netball League football season, Broadford and Yea Football Clubs merged for the remainder of the season.

On 6 December 2023 during a Special General Meeting, the Broadford Football department voted to go into recess for the 2024 football season, while the netball department will play in the Northern FNL winter competition.

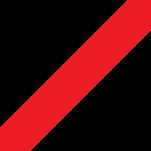
Broadford FC colours: 1884 - 1976

=== Broadford Independents Football Club ===
The Broadford Independents Football Club was formed in April, 1904 and initially played in the Broadford Shire Football Association.

This club played competition football in 1904 and 1906 and won the Central Mernda Football Association premiership in 1906 and wore blue and white colours.

The Broadford Independents Football Club and the Broadford Junior Football Club merged in 1907 and the Central Mernda FA folded prior to the 1907 football season.

It wasn't until 1931 that "The Independents" reformed as a new club and joined the Hume Highway Football Association and they played there from 1930 to 1938, playing in five grand finals in 1931, 1933, 1934, 1936 and 1937, winning premierships in 1931, 1933 and 1937.

It appears that the Broadford Independents Football Club went into recess prior to the 1939 football season and did not reform after World War Two and the Broadford Football Club moved from the Waranga North Eastern FA to the Hume Highway FA and played there in 1939 and 1940.

== Football competitions ==
Broadford FC Seniors

- 1884 - 1890: Club active playing "friendly" matches against local sides / towns.
- 1891 - 1903: North Eastern Football Association
- 1904 - Broadford Shire Football Association
- 1905 - North Eastern Football Association
- 1906 - Central Mernda Football Association
- 1907–1912: North Eastern Football Association
- 1913 - Midlands Football Association
- 1914 - Club in recess?
- 1915-1918: Club in recess due to World War One
- 1919-1920: Mernda Football Association
- 1921–1938: Waranga North East Football Association
- 1939–1940: Hume Highway Football Association
- 1941-1944: Broadford FC in recess due to World War Two
- 1945-1946: Hume Highway Football Association
- 1947–1976: Waranga North East Football Association
- 1977–1984: Riddell District Football League
- 1985–2008: Heathcote District Football League
- 2009–2019: Riddell District Football League
- 2020-2023: Outer East Football Netball League
- 2024-2025- Football in recess for the 2024 & 2025 season.
- 2026- Bendigo Football League

Reserves

1950 - Hume Highway Football Association

== Football Premierships ==
Broadford FC
Seniors

- Broadford Shire Football Association
  - 1904 (undefeated Premiers)
- North Eastern Football Association
  - 1909 - Broadford: 9.12 - 66 d Longwood: 5.6 - 36
  - 1911 - Broadford: 8.8 - 56 d Seymour: 6.12 - 48
- Midlands Football Association
  - 1913: Broadford: 6.6 - 42 d Wallan: 4.4 - 28
- Mernda Football Association
  - 1919 - Broadford: 4.10 - 34 d Kilmore: 4.5 - 29
- Waranga North East Football Association
  - 1924 - Broadford: 8.14 - 62 d Seymour: 5.12 - 42
  - 1925 - Broadford: defeated Seymour by 9 points
  - 1926 - Broadford: defeated Seymour (undefeated Premiers)
  - 1927 - Broadford: 20.9 - 129 d Seymour: 16.8 - 104
  - 1929 - Broadford: 13.12 - 90 d Yea: 12.5 - 77
  - 1930 - Broadford: 13.11 - 89 d Alexandra: 8.10 - 58
- Hume Highway Football League
  - 1945 - Broadford: defeated Lancefield:
  - 1946 - Broadford: 18.20 - 128 d Kilmore: 7.9 - 51
- Waranga North East Football Association
  - 1949 - Broadford: 10.13 - 73 d Thorton: 10.10 - 70
  - 1971 - Broadford: 12.17 - 89 d Seymour: 6.11 - 47
  - 1972 - Broadford: 12.10 - 82 d Seymour: 10.11 - 71
  - 1973 - Broadford: 17.15 - 117 d Seymour: 15.4 - 94
  - 1974 - Broadford: 10.15 - 75 d Seymour: 4.10 - 34
- Riddell District Football League - Division Two
  - 1981 - Broadford:
  - 1984 - Broadford:
- Heathcote District Football League
  - 1996 - Broadford: 7.8 - 50 d Mt. Pleasant: 6.9 - 45

Broadford Independents FC

- Central Mernda Football Association
  - 1906 - Broadford Independents: defeated Kilmore:
  - 1911 - Broadford Independents: defeated Wallan:
- Hume Highway Football Association
  - 1931: Broadford Independents: defeated Tallarook by 11 points.
  - 1933: Broadford Independents: 11.9 - 75 d Wallan East: 3.14 - 32
  - 1937: Broadford Independents: 15.10 - 100 d Wallan: 9.10 - 64

Reserves

- Waranga North East Football Association
  - 1971, 1972

Thirds

- Waranga North East Football Association
  - 1962, 1963, 1965, 1966

== Football - Runners Up ==
Broadford FC
Seniors

- North Eastern Football Association
  - 1908, 1910, 1912
- Waranga North East Football Association
  - 1921, 1922, 1940, 1959
- Riddell District Football League
  - 1977, 1978, 1979
- Heathcote District Football League
  - 1986 - Stanhope: 22.8 - 140 d Broadford: 6.8 - 44
  - 2001 - Mt. Pleasant: 10.8 - 68 d Broadford: 6.8 - 44
  - 2003 - Colbinabbin: 20.13 - 133 d Broadford: 16.16 - 102

Reserves

- Hume Highway Football Association
  - 1950 - Strathbogie: 11.7 - 73 d Broadford Reserves: 8.13 - 61

Thirds

- Waranga North East Football Association
  - 1964

Broadford Independents FC

- Hume Highway Football Association
  - 1934 - Wallan: 9.19 - 73 d Broadford Independents: 7.8 - 50
  - 1936 - Darraweit Guim defeated Broadford Independents:

== League Best and Fairest Awards ==
Senior Football

- Waranga North East Football Association
  - 1961: David Grubb
  - 1964: Geoff Kirby
  - 1970 & 1971: John Bordignon

== Leading league goalkickers ==
Seniors

- Heathcote District Football League
  - 2001: 77 - Shane Moore
  - 2002: 94 - Adrian Baker
  - 2003: 100 - Adrian Baker
- Riddell District Football League
  - 2009: 43 - Sam Taylor

== VFL/AFL footballers ==
The following footballers played with Broadford, prior to playing senior football in the VFL/AFL, and / or drafted, with the year indicating their VFL/AFL debut.

- 1922 - George Clark - (Richmond)
- 1922 - Ray Ross - (Richmond)
- 1925 - Joe Hammond - (Essendon)
- 1929 - Jack Green - (Carlton)
- 1956 - Bob Suter - (Essendon)
- 1957 - Kevin Green - (Essendon)
- 1958 - Kevin Parks - (Essendon)
- 1959 - Eon Densworth - (Footscray)
- 1974 - Peter Keays - (Melbourne)
- 1985 - Alan Ezard - (Essendon)
- 1996 - Barry Hall - (St Kilda, Sydney Swans and Western Bulldogs)
- 2005 - James Ezard - (Port Adelaide)
- 2006 - Richard Douglas - (Adelaide)

== Bibliography ==
- History of Football in the Bendigo District by John Stoward - ISBN 9780980592917
