= Euroa Football Club =

Australian rules football and netball club

Names
- Full name: Euroa Football Netball Club
- Nickname: Magpies

Club details
- Founded: 1880; 146 years ago
- Colours
- Competition: Goulburn Valley Football League
- Premierships: (18) 1894, 1899, 1905, 1911, 1913, 1922, 1936, 1937, 1957, 1958, 1963, 1964, 1965, 1967, 1969, 1970, 1971, 1990
- Ground: Memorial Oval

Uniforms
Home

Other information
- Official website: Euroa FNC

The Euroa Football Netball Club, nicknamed the Magpies, is an Australian rules football and netball club sited in the town of Euroa, in the north-east of Victoria.

== History ==
The Euroa Football Club was first established in 1880 and initially competed in the Euroa Challenge Cup in 1886 and 1887.

In 1900, Euroa hosted a match between Collingwood and the North Eastern Football Association, with Collingwood: 12.15 - 87 d NEFA: 7.4 - 46.

In the interest of football in Euroa in 1909, the Euroa Magpies FC and Euroa FC merged to form one club and entered the North East Football Association. The Euroa Wednesdays FC entered a team in the Euroa (Wednesday) Football Association.

In May 1934, Euroa FC and the Euroa Imperials FC merged to form Euroa United FC and entered one team in the Waranga North East Football Association

In June 1952, 17 year old Euroa footballer, James Arthur Clarke was fatally injured in his first senior match against Seymour at Euroa when his head collided with the knees of a Seymour player.

The club teams has competed in the Goulburn Valley Football League since 1971.

There were a number of other Euroa football clubs that existed in the early 1900's that played in the Euroa District Football Association -

- Euroa Blues FC - (1926)
- Euroa Imperials FC - (1913 - 1933)
- Euroa Juniors FC - (1912)
- Euroa Magpies FC - (1907 & 1908)
- Euroa United Seconds FC - (1935 - 1949)
- Euroa Wednesdays FC - (1909 - 1911)

== Football Leagues ==
Euroa Football Club has played in the following football competitions -

- Euroa Challenge Cup: W. H. Haley Trophy. Esq, J.P. (Seven Creeks Estate)
  - 1886 (won by Karramomus FC)
- Euroa Challenge Cup: George Sutherland Trophy. Esq. (Euroa Hotel)
  - 1887 (won by Castle Creek FC)
- Euroa FC active, but no official competitions
  - 1888 - 1890
- North Eastern Football Association (NEFA)
  - 1891–1893
- Euroa Football Association
  - 1894
- Euroa FC in recess
  - 1895
- North Eastern Football Association (NEFA)
  - 1896 - 1902
- Euroa District Football Association (EDFA)
  - 1903-1908
- North Eastern Football Association (NEFA)
  - 1909–1912
- Waranga North East Football Association (WNEFA)
  - 1913–1930
- Euroa District Football Association (EDFA)
  - 1931–1933
- Waranga North East Football Association (WNEFA)
  - 1934–1938
- Goulburn Valley Football League
  - 1939 & 1940,
- Euroa District Football Association (EDFA)
  - 1944–1946
- Waranga North East Football Association (WNEFA)
  - 1947–1970
- Goulburn Valley Football League
  - 1971 - 2024

== Football Premierships (All Leagues) ==
Seniors
Euroa FC

- Euroa Football Association
  - 1894
- North Eastern Football Association`
  - 1899
- Euroa District Football Association (EDFA)
  - 1905 - Euroa: 5.8 - 38 d Longwood: 3.8 - 26 (1 total);
- North Eastern Football Association`
  - 1911 - Euroa: 7.14 - 56 d Gymnasium: 7.12 - 54
- Waranga North East Football Association (WNEFA) (12 total)
  - 1913 - Euroa: 10.12 - 72 d Nagambie: 2.18 - 30
  - 1922 - Euroa: defeated Broadford:
  - 1936 - Euroa: 14.22 - 106 d Nagambie: 14.19 - 103
  - 1937 - Euroa: 9.20 - 74 d Yea: 4.11 - 35
  - 1957 - Euroa: 12.11 - 83 d Mansfield: 9.7 - 61
  - 1958 - Euroa: 13.18 - 96 d Thornton: 5.12 - 42
  - 1963 - Euroa: 9.8 - 63 d Thornton - Eildon: 7.14 - 56
  - 1964 - Euroa: 9.12 - 66 d Seymour: 7.10 - 52
  - 1965 - Euroa: 9.7 - 61 d Alexandra: 8.10 - 58
  - 1967 - Euroa: 12.14 - 86 d Seymour: 8.6 - 54
  - 1969 - Euroa: 22.13 - 145 d Seymour: 10.7 - 67
  - 1970 - Euroa: 18.14 - 122 d Seymour: 8.13 - 61
- Goulburn Valley Football League (GVFL)
  - 1971, 1990 (2 total)

Euroa Imperials FC

- Euroa District Football Association
  - 1926 - Euroa Imperials: 7.4 - 46 d Euroa Blues: 3.9 - 27
  - 1930 - Euroa Imperials: defeated Longwood: by 20 points, but lost the premiership on an appeal from Longwood.

Euroa Wednesdays FC

- Euroa District Football Association
  - 1911 - Euroa Wednesdays: 7.14 - 56 d Benalla Gymnasium: 7.12 - 52

Euroa Magpies FC

- Euroa District Football Association
  - 1907 - Euroa Magpies: 7.5 - 47 d Euroa: 5.11 - 41

Euroa Reserves

- Euroa District Football Association
  - 1946
- Waranga North East Football Association
  - 1963, 1964, 1965, 1966, 1968
- Goulburn Valley Football League
  - 1997, 2014

Euroa Thirds

- Waranga North East Football Association
  - 1964, 1969 (undefeated champions)

== VFL / AFL Players ==
The following footballers originally played with Euroa FC prior to making their VFL / AFL debut.

- 1901 - Paddy McGuiness - St. Kilda
- 1901 - Jim McLean - Melbourne
- 1907 - Charles Bolton - Essendon
- 1907 - Graham Diggle - Collingwood
- 1910 - Bill Scott - Richmond
- 1913 - George Pattison - Fitzroy
- 1926 - Bert Carey - Fitzroy
- 1933 - Jack Sambell - Melbourne
- 1936 - Mick McFarlane - Essendon
- 1951 - Les Reed - Geelong
- 1953 - Wally Nash - Hawthorn
- 1956 - Dick O'Bree - Collingwood
- 1965 - Don Gross - Essendon
- 1997 - Hayden Lamaro - Melbourne
- 1998 - Rory Hilton - Brisbane Lions
- 2000 - Andrew Mills - Richmond
- 2010 - Relton Roberts - Richmond
- 2012 - Jamie Elliott - Collingwood

The following footballers came to Euroa after playing in the VFA, VFL, AFL, with the year indicating their debut with Euroa FC.

- 1948 - Jack Cassin - Essendon
- 1951 - Ivor McIvor - Essendon
- 1952 - Jack Whelan - Brunswick
- 1964 - Bob Hempel - Footscray
- 1990 - David Robertson - Collingwood
- 2023 - Will Hayes - Western Bulldogs & Carlton

== League Best and Fairest Winners ==
Senior Football

- Waranga North East Football Association
  - 1951 - Arthur Frost
  - 1955 - Les Reed
  - 1957 - Ian Hughes
  - 1958 - Peter Brodie
- Goulburn Valley Football League - Morrison Medal
  - 1998 - Adam Baker

== Football Team of the Century ==
This team was presented to the Euroa FNC in August, 2001.

- Backline: Bob Bosustow, Neil Currie, Rod Ferguson
- Half Backline: Ray McLaine, Barrie Nolan, Peter O'Donohue
- Centreline: Don Gross, Ian McRoberts, Arthur Frost
- Half Forwardline: Robert Gall, Ian Hughes, Les Reed
- Forwardline: Jack Ahern, Dick O'Bree, Kevin Morrison
- Ruck: Ed Charman
- Ruck Rover: Murray Gall
- Rover: Mick Peel
- Interchange: Adam Baker, Robert Jagoe, Rex Dowell, Ian Harrison
- Coach: Dick O'Bree
- Captain: Bob Bosustow
- President: Harry Alexander
- Secretary: Pat Giovannini

== GVFNL - Hall of Fame Inductees ==
- 2016 - Kevin Storer
- 2019 - Bruce Watson
- 2021 - Scott Watson

== Notable local Euroa football players ==
- Craig Bamford: 375+ Senior games
- Bob Bosustow: Premiership coach 1957 and 58.
- David King: Former NFL Punter with New England Patriots.
- Kevin Storer: Premiership coach 1990. 201 senior games.
- Scott Watson: 365 senior & 55 reserves games.
- Dick O'Bree: Euroa Premiership player in 1957 and 1958 after kicking 140 goals in a premiership year as a 16 year old at Lake Boga. Began coaching Euroa in 1963 and were premiers in 63, 64 and 65. Premiers again in 67, 69 and 70. Coached the club to a premiership in 1971 its first year in the GVFL. Kicked over 1200 goals in his career. Also coached the reserves to numerous premierships at the same time as coaching the senior team. Played in 11 premierships. Coached 7 premierships.
