= William Shelton =

William Shelton may refer to:

- William Shelton (chief) (1869–1938), of the Snohomish tribe of Native Americans
- Bill Shelton (footballer, born 1902), Australian rules footballer for Melbourne
- Bill Shelton (politician) (1929–2003), Conservative Party politician in the United Kingdom
- Bill Shelton (footballer, born 1936), Australian rules footballer for Hawthorn
- William L. Shelton (born 1954), United States Air Force general
- William Shelton (university administrator), interim chancellor at East Carolina University
