= Avenel Football Club =

Avenel FNC

Names
- Full name: Avenel Football Netball Club
- Nickname(s): Swans
- Club song: "See the Swans Fly Up!"

2023 season
- Home-and-away season: 7th
- Leading goalkicker: Dylan Hoysted (45)

Club details
- Founded: 1881; 144 years ago
- Colours
- Competition: Kyabram & District Football League
- President: Bruce Rowley
- Premierships: (15) 1898, 1900, 1901, 1903, 1905, 1906, 1921, 1922, 1933, 1978, 1979, 1984, 1985, 1989, 1994.
- Ground(s): Avenel Community Centre (capacity: 5,000)

Uniforms
Home	Away

Other information
- Official website: Avenel FNC website

The Avenel Football Club fields two football sides in the Seniors & Reserves divisions of the Kyabram and District Football League. The Club wear a predominantly white jumper with a red "V", like that of the old South Melbourne Football Club in the VFL.

The Kyabram and District Football League is a football league that covers an area similar to that of the Goulburn Valley and Picola & District Football Leagues, the league currently contains thirteen clubs.

== History ==
Avenel is located on the Hume Highway in Central Victoria, Australia, not far from Seymour, Victoria and the Avenel Football Club is an Australian rules football club that was established in 1881 with evidence of a match against Seymour and many more games against other local towns up until the late 1890s when it first competed in the North East Football Association in 1898.

Avenel first competed in the Waranga North East Football Association in 1913.

The club is known as the 'Swans'. The Swans have won 16 senior premierships in their history. Between 1956 and 1976 Avenel merged with Longwood and were Avenel-Longwood Football Club.

The club currently competes in the Kyabram District Football League, where it has been one of the more successful clubs winning six premierships over the last thirty years, including back to back premierships in 1978 & 1979 and 1984 & 1985.

Avenel shares a fierce rivalry with neighbours Nagambie. With the two clubs' Under 18 football sides playing for the Tabilk Cup each year. The Cup is donated by the Tabilk Junior Football Club, where the junior footballers under the age of 16 from both Avenel and Nagambie play jointly for the one club.

The Swans also share a rivalry, along with a piece of silverware with Violet Town; the Scott Kanters-Peter Ryan Cup, which the two clubs play for annually. The cup is awarded to the team that wins the game between the two sides each year. If the two clubs play each other twice during the home and away season, then the cup is contested when the team presently holding the cup hosts the other club.

The most notable footballer of recent times to have played for Avenel Football Club is former AFL footballer Barry Hall, who played 289 games with St Kilda, Western Bulldogs and Sydney Swans, having previously played in the club's 1994 Under 18 premiership.

Football Timeline

- 1881 - 1890: An active club that played against other local teams / towns.
- 1891 - 1912: North East Football Association
- 1913 - 1938: Waranga North East Football Association
- 1939 - Club in recess
- 1940 - Goulburn Valley Football League
- 1941 - 1945: Goulburn Valley Football League in recess due to World War Two
- 1945 - 1946: Euroa District Football Association
- 1947 - 1955: Waranga North East Football Association.
- 1956 - 1975: Waranga North East Football Association. Merged with Longwood Football Club & were known as the Avenel / Longwood Football Club.
- 1976 - 2024: Reformed as a stand alone club in 1976 & joined the Kyabram District Football League.

== Football Premierships ==
Senior Premierships

- North Eastern Football Association
  - 1898 - Avenel: 5.5 - 35 d Euroa: 3.4 - 22
  - 1900 - Avenel: 2.6 - 18 d Seymour: 1.7 - 13
  - 1901 - Avenel: 6.6 - 42 d Seymour: 2.3 - 15
  - 1903 - Avenel: 4.6 - 30 d Seymour: 3.7 - 25
  - 1905 - Avenel: 10.12 - 72 d Tallarook: 5.10 - 40
  - 1906 - Avenel: d ?
- Waranga North East Football Association
  - 1921 - Avenel: 6.3 - 39 d Broadford: 3.9 - 27
  - 1932 - Avenel: 14.13 - 97 d Alexandra: 11.6 - 72
  - 1933 - Avenel: 9.13 - 67 d Nagambie: 5.8 - 38
- Kyabram District Football League
  - 1978
  - 1979
  - 1984
  - 1985
  - 1989
  - 1994

Reserve Premierships

- Kyabram District Football League
  - 1978, 1979, 1985, 2002

Under 18 Premierships

- Kyabram District Football League
  - 1979, 1983, 1984, 1994, 2000, 2005, 2006

== Football League Best & Fairest Winners ==
- Waranga North East Football Association
  - 1948 - Alan Willis
  - 1953 - Alan Willis. (Same votes as the winner, but finished 2nd under the old count-back system).
  - 1954 - Alan Willis.
  - 1956 - Geoff Baker
- Kyabram District Football League
  - 1988 - Rohan Aldous
  - 1991 - Peter Thorpe
  - 2015 - Don Stirling
  - 2016 - Kasey Duncan
  - 2023 - Braydon Avola

== KDFL Leading Goal Kickers ==
- 1984 - William Hannam (83)
- 1994 - Darren Brock (77)
- 2019 - Kasey Duncan (58)

== VFL / AFL Players ==
The following footballers played with Avenel, prior to playing senior football in the VFL/AFL, and / or drafted, with the year indicating their VFL/AFL debut.

- 1906 - Pat O'Connor: St. Kilda
- 1917 - Frank Martin: Carlton
- 1926 - Jack Shelton: St. Kilda
- 1928 - Pat Tebble: South Melbourne
- 1935 - Pye Lewis: Footscray
- 1957 - John Henderson: Collingwood
- 1957 - Alan White: Carlton
- 1959 - Ian Shelton: Essendon
- 1960 - Brian Morrison: Richmond
- 1966 - Peter Corkran: Fitzroy
- 1984 - Leon Baker: Essendon
- 1996 - Barry Hall - St. Kilda

== Avenel Football Club song ==
"See the Swans fly up, up, to win the premiership flag,
Our boys who play this kind of game,
Are always striving for glory and fame,
To see the Swans fly up, up, up,
The other teams they don't fear,
They all try their best,
But they can't get near,
As the Swans fly up!"
