= Memorial Oval =

Memorial Oval may refer to:

- Bankstown Memorial Oval, sports stadium in Sydney, New South Wales, Australia
- Euroa Memorial Oval, sports venue in Euroa, Victoria, Australia
