= Sambell =

Sambell is a surname. Notable people with the surname include:

- Geoffrey Sambell (1914–1980), Australian Anglican bishop
- Jack Sambell (1908–1982), Australian footballer
- Kathy Sambell (born 1963), Australian sprinter
- Bill Sambell (1910–1974), Australian rower
- Darryl Sambell (1945–2001), Australian talent manager
