= Michael McFarlane =

Michael McFarlane may refer to:

- Mick McFarlane (EastEnders), a fictional character from the BBC soap opera EastEnders
- Mick McFarlane (footballer) (1908–1981), Australian rules footballer
- Mike McFarlane (1960–2023), British athlete

== See also ==
- Mike Macfarlane (born 1964), American baseball player
- Michael McFarland (disambiguation)
