= Don Gross =

Don Gross may refer to:

- Don Gross (baseball) (1931–2017), pitcher for Cincinnati and Pittsburgh
- Don Gross (footballer) (born 1947), former VFL footballer for Essendon
