= Ian Shelton (footballer) =

Australian rules footballer (1940–2021)

Personal information
- Full name: Ian Stanley Shelton
- Nickname: Bluey
- Born: 24 February 1940
- Died: 17 March 2021 (aged 81)
- Original team: Avenel-Longwood Football Club
- Height: 185 cm (6 ft 1 in)
- Weight: 87 kg (192 lb)
- Position: centre half-back

Playing career^{1}
Years	Club	Games (Goals)
1959–1963	Essendon	77 (1)
1965	Essendon	14 (1)
- ^{1} Playing statistics correct to the end of 1965.

Career highlights
- VFL premiership 1962, 1965; Best first year player (Essendon) 1959; Essendon Semi-Final Team: 1959, 1960, 1962, 1965; Essendon Preliminary Final Team: 1959, 1965; Essendon Grand Final Team: 1959, 1962, 1965; VFL Inter-State Representative Team: 1962; Essendon Vice-Captain: 1965.; Life Membership: Essendon Football Club.

Ian Stanley "Bluey" Shelton (24 February 1940 – 17 March 2021), known throughout his career as "Bluey", due to his thatch of red hair, was an Australian rules footballer, who played with Essendon in the Victorian Football League (VFL) during the 1960s.

== Family ==
The son of Stanley Charles Shelton (1903–1983) and Jean Shelton (died 1978), née Dickens, Ian was born on 24 February 1940. He married Margery Henrietta Elliot on 26 March 1966.

He is the nephew of John Thomas "Jack" Shelton (1905–1941), who played for St Kilda and South Melbourne, and the cousin of Bill Shelton, who played with Hawthorn.

=== Ned Kelly ===
As a young lad of 7, his grandfather, Richard Shelton, was saved from drowning in swollen Hughes Creek, Avenel by a young Ned Kelly, aged 10.

== VFL Footballer ==
Recruited from Avenel, where he finished second in the 1958 Waranga North East Football Association, best and fairest award. Shelton was able to kick well with both feet, and played at centre half-back for Essendon for 91 games, in six seasons, kicking two goals.

"Bluey" Shelton, [Essendon's] 1965 vice-captain, was a big, rugged, red-headed centre half back who would go through a brick wall if necessary to clear the ball from the opposing goals. (Mapleston, 1996, p.204)

=== 1959 ===
Shelton came to Essendon, as a centre half-back, from Avenel in 1959. There were a number of delays in him getting a clearance from Avenel and a permit play from the VFL was not granted until 20 May 1959. Consequently, he was not eligible to play his first match for Essendon until the (round 5) match against Geelong on 23 May 1959, when he was selected to replace the team's regular centre half-back, Jeff Gamble, who was injured and unable to play. Shelton was one of Essendon's best players in a team that (unexpectedly) beat Geelong by 30 points: 11.18 (84) to 7.12 (54).

All in all, in his first season with Essendon, he played in seven senior home-and-away games, all three finals, including the Grand Final, where he played at centre half-back, in Essendon's 37 point loss — 11.12 (78) to 17.13 (115) — earned three votes in the Brownlow medal, and won the award for Essendon's best first year player.

=== 1962 ===
External videos
- Ian "Bluey" Shelton (Part I), Bomber TV, 11 April 2016.
- Ian "Bluey" Shelton (Part II), Bomber TV, 13 April 2016.
- Ian "Bluey" Shelton (Part III), Bomber TV, 15 April 2016.

In 1962, Shelton played representative football for Victoria in 1962: against Tasmania on 17 June, and against South Australia on 14 July, he played in Essendon's 1962 premiership team at centre half-back in a team that defeated Carlton by 32 points — 13.12 (90) to 8.19 (58) — and was runner-up, to John Birt, as Essendon's best and fairest player.

=== 1964 ===
He did not play for the entire 1964 season due to an extremely serious eye injury he suffered in November 1963, "necessitating serious operations and treatment" (Maplestone, 1966, p. 198):

"Ian Shelton is expected to leave the Eye and Ear Hospital tomorrow after an operation to his right eye. A fragment of steel lodged in Shelton's eye as he was watching a mechanic repair a tractor on his farm at Avenel, two weeks ago".
"Although Essendon centre half-back Ian Shelton has little chance of playing this year [viz., 1964] because of an eye injury, he has been placed on Essendon's list 'to be considered when available'."

=== 1965 ===
Although only able to see out of one eye, he returned to Essendon in 1965, and was appointed the team's vice captain. He broke his hand early in the season, and was out for three games; and, later in the season, sustained a serious knee injury that kept him out of action for four matches. He finished his final season playing in 14 games; the last being his third Grand Final, and his second premiership team.

On the day of the 1965 Grand Final, with a severe shoulder injury (the severity of which had been kept secret from the public), Shelton was "in two minds [before the match] as to whether to play because he didn't want to let the team down" by under-performing; however, "he was persuaded half an hour before the game by skipper Ken Fraser and the club doctor to take the field".

=== 1966 ===
He was released by Essendon in 1966, because they could not come to a mutually satisfactory arrangement for him to commute between Avenel and Essendon.

=== 1975 ===
In 1975, he was the official runner for the Essendon Football Club.

== Country Football ==
=== Avenel-Longwood ===
In 1958 he was playing with the Avenel-Longwood Football Club.

=== Seymour ===
He was captain-coach of the Seymour Football Club, in the Waranga North East Football League (WNEFL), from 1966 to 1969. He was coach of the Seymour (Goulburn Valley Football League) premiership team in 1982.

=== Avenel-Longwood ===
He was captain-coach of the Avenel-Longwood Football Club in 1970, 1971, 1972, and 1974, and was the club's best and fairest in 1971 and 1972.

== Awards ==
- 1959: Essendon Football Club — Best First-Year Player.
- 1962: Essendon Football Club — Outstanding Services Award.
- 1997: Essendon Football Club — One of Essendon's "Top 60 Players" (of a total of 1,001 potential candidates) from which the 25 members of the "Essendon Team of the Century" were chosen.
- 2005: Essendon Football Club — Life Membership.
- 2012: Seymour Football Club — Centre Half-Back in Seymour's "Team of the Century".
- 2012: Seymour Football Club — Coach of Seymour's "Team of the Century".
- 2016: Essendon Football Club — Centre Half-Back in Essendon's "Team of the Country".
- 2019: Essendon Football Club — Hall of Fame.
