= Alan Jewell =

Australian rules footballer

Personal information
- Full name: Alan Jewell
- Born: 19 February 1932
- Died: 22 August 2017 (aged 85)
- Original team: Mansfield
- Height: 180 cm (5 ft 11 in)
- Weight: 78 kg (172 lb)

Playing career^{1}
Years	Club	Games (Goals)
1955	Hawthorn	2 (0)
- ^{1} Playing statistics correct to the end of 1955.

Alan Jewell (19 February 1932 – 22 August 2017) was an Australian rules footballer who played for the Hawthorn Football Club in the Victorian Football League (VFL).

Originally from Mansfield, where he was best on ground in their 1951 Waranga North East Football Association grand final win over Euroa and was a member of their 1953 and 1954 Waranga North East Football Association premiership teams before joining Hawthorn in 1955. Coming on the back of a 102 goal season with Mansfield, Jewell was recruited as a full forward. Even though he displayed good form in the early season practice matches, Jewell struggled in the official in the two games he played and pull the pin and returned to Mansfield at the end of the season. In 1956 Brighton (VFA) recruited him mid-year and played four games and kicked 9 goals.
