= Tony Barnes =

Australian rules footballer

Personal information
- Full name: Tony Barnes
- Born: 16 May 1956 (age 70)
- Original team: Seymour (GVL)
- Height: 182 cm (6 ft 0 in)
- Weight: 86 kg (190 lb)

Playing career^{1}
Years	Club	Games (Goals)
1980–1981	Melbourne	7 (2)
- ^{1} Playing statistics correct to the end of 1981.

Tony Barnes (born 16 May 1956) is a former Australian rules footballer who represented the Melbourne Football Club in the Victorian Football League (VFL) during the 1980s.

Recruited from Goulburn Valley League (GVL) club Seymour, Barnes played 7 games across his two seasons with the Demons before being delisted.
