= Peter Garratt =

Australian rules footballer

Personal information
- Full name: Peter Garratt
- Born: 31 January 1956 (age 70)
- Original team: Seymour
- Height: 185 cm (6 ft 1 in)
- Weight: 79.5 kg (175 lb)

Playing career^{1}
Years	Club	Games (Goals)
1978	Melbourne	1 (0)
- ^{1} Playing statistics correct to the end of 1978.

Peter Garratt (born 31 January 1956) is a former Australian rules footballer who played with Melbourne in the Victorian Football League (VFL).
