= Kevin Parks =

Kevin Parks may refer to:

- Kevin Parks (Australian footballer)
- Kevin Parks (American football)
