= Ken Whitfort =

Australian rules footballer

Personal information
- Full name: Ken Whitfort
- Born: 10 October 1959 (age 67)
- Original team: Seymour
- Height: 185 cm (6 ft 1 in)
- Weight: 76 kg (168 lb)

Playing career^{1}
Years	Club	Games (Goals)
1978–79	Melbourne	12 (8)
- ^{1} Playing statistics correct to the end of 1979.

Ken Whitfort (born 10 October 1959) is a former Australian rules footballer who played with Melbourne in the Victorian Football League (VFL).
