= John Henderson (Australian rules footballer) =

Australian rules footballer (1938–2025)

Personal information
- Born: 31 August 1938
- Died: 10 September 2025 (aged 87)
- Original team: Avenel (WNEFA)
- Height: 187 cm (6 ft 2 in)
- Weight: 91 kg (201 lb)

Playing career
Years	Club	Games (Goals)
1957–1966	Collingwood	144 (28)

John Bruce Henderson (31 August 1938 – 10 September 2025) was an Australian rules footballer who played for Collingwood in the Victorian Football League (VFL).

Originally from Avenel Football Club in the Waranga North East Football Association (WNEFA), Henderson made his senior VFL debut in 1957 as a half back before moving into a centreman role. Although he never won a best and fairest, Henderson was Collingwood's top vote getter in the 1963 Brownlow Medal count, finishing 4th in the league, and he was a Victorian interstate representative.

Henderson was appointed captain of Collingwood for the 1965 VFL season. Replaced as captain by Des Tuddenham for the 1966 VFL season, Henderson played in the 1966 VFL Grand Final, which they lost to St Kilda by a point.

He then left Collingwood to coach Yarraville in the Victorian Football Association.

In 1972, Henderson coached local team Donvale United to a premiership in the ESCFA.

Henderson later coached Wodonga in the Ovens & Murray Football League from 1978 to 1980.

Henderson died on 10 September 2025, 10 days after his 87th birthday.
