= Robert Lockhart =

Robert Lockhart may refer to:

- Robert Douglas Lockhart (1894–1987), Scottish anatomist
- Sir R. H. Bruce Lockhart (1887–1970), British journalist, author, and secret agent
- Sir Rob Lockhart (1893–1981), British general, Commander in Chief of the Indian Army, and scout movement notable
- Bob Lockhart (1931–2023), Canadian politician and mayor of Saint John, New Brunswick
- Bob Lockhart (footballer) (1940–2010), Australian rules footballer
- Robert Lockhart (composer), pianist and composer; see Louisa Young
