= Graham Diggle =

Australian rules footballer

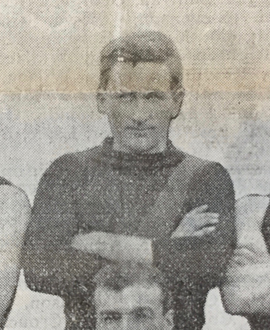
- Diggle in 1914

Personal information
- Full name: Graham Diggle
- Born: 13 March 1889; Flemington, Victoria
- Died: 31 May 1971 (aged 82); Seymour, Victoria
- Original team: Euroa
- Height: 180 cm (5 ft 11 in)
- Weight: 83 kg (183 lb)

Playing career^{1}
Years	Club	Games (Goals)
1907–09	Collingwood (VFL)	13 (1)
1912–15, 1919	Essendon A (VFA)	47 (49)
1920–24	Seymour (WNEFA)	
- ^{1} Playing statistics correct to the end of 1919.

Graham Diggle (13 March 1889 – 31 May 1971) was an Australian rules footballer who played with Collingwood in the Victorian Football League (VFL).

== Family ==
The son of George Diggle (1860-1938), an undertaker, and Lucy Diggle (1870-1946), née Bird, Graham Diggle was born at Flemington, Victoria on 13 March 1889.

He married Agnes Mary Smith (1886-1959) on 11 April 1914.

Seymour Racecourse Land Bill
Victorian Legislative Council Debate (10 May 1966).

The Hon. D.G. Elliott.—
I remember that a member of a committee of the Seymour Football
Club, which played in the Waranga-North-East League, was an ex-
Collingwood footballer, Graham Diggle. Apart from being a builder,
Mr. Diggle was also the local undertaker. There was a famous
phrase in the Waranga area, "When it ceases to wriggle, you take
it to Diggle." If he is still living in the area, I hope members who
represent it will pass on our kind regards to Mr. Diggle, who in his
day was a great ruckman.
(Parliament of Victoria, Hansard).

== Football ==
=== Collingwood VFL) ===
Recruited from the Euroa Football Club in the Euroa District Football League (EDFL), he played 13 games for Collingwood's First XVIII over three seasons: 9 games in 1907; 2 games in 1908; and 2 games in 1909.

=== Euroa (EDFL) ===
Released by Collingwood in May 1909, he returned to the Euroa Football Club.

=== Essendon A (VFA) ===
Cleared from Collingwood to Essendon A in the VFA in July 1912, Diggle played in 44 First XVIII matches for Essendon from 1912 to 1915, and 3 games in the post-war VFA competition in 1919.

=== Seymour (WNEFA) ===
From 1920 to 1924, he was captain-coach of the Seymour Football Club in the Waranga North East Football Association. The team won two premierships in Diggle's time as coach: in 1920, and in 1923 (unbeaten in the entire season).

== Death ==
He died at Seymour, Victoria on 31 May 1971.
