= Bob Hammond (footballer, born 1905) =

Australian rules footballer, born 1905

Personal information
- Full name: Robert Samuel Hammond
- Born: 1 September 1905; Benalla, Victoria
- Died: 2 March 1993 (aged 87); Broadford, Victoria
- Original team: Broadford
- Height: 182 cm (6 ft 0 in)
- Weight: 84 kg (185 lb)

Playing career^{1}
Years	Club	Games (Goals)
1927–28, 1931–33	Hawthorn	34 (14)
1933	St Kilda	1 (0)
Total		35 (14)
- ^{1} Playing statistics correct to the end of 1933.

Robert Samuel Hammond (1 September 1905 – 2 March 1993) was an Australian rules footballer who played with Hawthorn and St Kilda in the Victorian Football League (VFL).

== Family ==
The son of William Hammond (1879–1908) and Sarah Jane Hammond (1873–1958), née Johnson, Robert Samuel Hammond was born at Benalla on 1 September 1905.

His older brother, Joe Hammond, also played VFL football with Essendon.

Hammond married Mary Irene Folvig (1915–1999) on 20 Jan 1938 at Broadford.

== Football ==
Hammond joined Hawthorn from Broadford at the start of the 1927 VFL season and played eleven games at centre half back before injury put an end to his season. Hammond made a single appearance in 1928 and then returned to Broadford and did not play VFL football for two years.

Hammond reappeared with Hawthorn in 1931, scoring 14 goals in a further 22 appearances (mostly as a centre half forward) over the next couple of seasons. Although selected for the Round 6 game in 1933 he failed to play due to illness. After a couple of games in the reserves, Hammond made a mid-season move to St. Kilda. In his first game for St. Kilda Hammond suffered a significant knee injury and never again played VFL football.

Hammond later coached the Broadford team.

== Death ==
Robert Samuel Hammond died at Broadford on 2 March 1993.
