= Bob Lockhart (footballer) =

Australian rules footballer

Personal information
- Full name: Robert Frederick Lockhart
- Born: 26 August 1940
- Died: 25 October 2010 (aged 70)
- Original teams: Bonnie Doon, Mansfield
- Height: 173 cm (5 ft 8 in)
- Weight: 67 kg (148 lb)

Playing career^{1}
Years	Club	Games (Goals)
1961–62	Richmond	13 (7)
- ^{1} Playing statistics correct to the end of 1962.

Robert Frederick Lockhart (26 August 1940 – 25 October 2010) was an Australian rules footballer who played with Richmond in the Victorian Football League (VFL).

Lockhart was initially from Bonnie Doon Football Club, then recruited from the Mansfield Football Club in the Waranga North East Football Association.
