= Waranga North East Football Association =

Australian rules football association

- Formerly: Waranga North East Football Association
- Founded: 1913
- Folded: 1976

The Waranga North East Football Association was established in 1913 as an Australian Rules football association which was based in the North East and Upper Goulburn Valley regions of Victoria and was active up until 1976.

== History ==
In May 1913 representatives from Avenel, Euroa, Murchison, Nagambie and Seymour met at the Tabilk Hotel, Tabilk and formed the Waranga North East Football Association, with a draw being established with the first round of matches taking place on Wednesday, 21 May 1913.

Broadford hold the record with four, for the most consecutive premiership wins in a row, which they achieved twice between 1924 and 1927 and later on between 1971 and 1974.Amazingly, Broadford defeated Seymour in all eight grand finals.

Three clubs went through the season as undefeated premiers: Nagambie in 1919 and 1938, Seymour in 1923 and Euroa in 1963 and 1969.

In 1926, J P Minogue, from Seymour (one of the founders of the association) was presented with a Life Membership gold medal for his services rendered.

In 1939 the WNEFA went into recess, with Euroa, Nagambie and Seymour joining the Goulburn Valley Football League and Yea joining the Alexandra Mansfield Football Association. Broadford withdrew from the competition in 1939, due to the closure of the local paper mills.

Mick Minogue (Avenel) was secretary of the former North East Football Association and then the WNEFA from February 1908 to 1939 and never missed a delegate's meeting during that time.

The original colours of the WNEFA representative jumper were blue and gold.

In May 1950, the WNEFA changed its name to the Waranga North East Football League.

In 1960, Bill Burns was presented with a WNEFL Life Membership. Burns was a former coach of Broadford and association delegate.

In October 1960, the WNEFL was granted major league status by the Victorian Country Football League.

The Bonnie Doon senior team played in nine consecutive WNEFL Reserves grand finals between 1956 and 1964.

In 1966, Dick Tossol from Thornton received a Life Membership of the WNRFL.

Seymour made a record ten consecutive grand finals between 1966 and 1975, winning premierships in 1966 and 1975, but were also runner up for an incredible eight consecutive years between 1967 and 1974.

=== Records ===
Senior Football Records
Most premierships	12 – Euroa FC
Most premierships in a row	4 – Broadford: 1924 – 27 & 1971 – 74
Most grand finals in a row	10 – Seymour FC: 1966 – 1975
Highest grand final score	1969 – Euroa: 22.13 – 145 d Seymour: 10.7 – 67
Highest winning grand final margin	1969 – (78 points) – Euroa: 22.13 – 145 d Seymour: 10.7 – 67
Highest losing grand final score	1927 – Broadford: 20.9 – 129 d Seymour: 16.8 – 104
Most goals in a grand final	8: Dick O'Bree (Euroa). 1955 Mansfield d Euroa.
Highest Team Score	?
Most goals in a season	?
Most goals in a game	13: Alan Jewell, Mansfield v Thornton AV, 24 April 1954
Most wins in a row	38: Euroa.

== Clubs ==
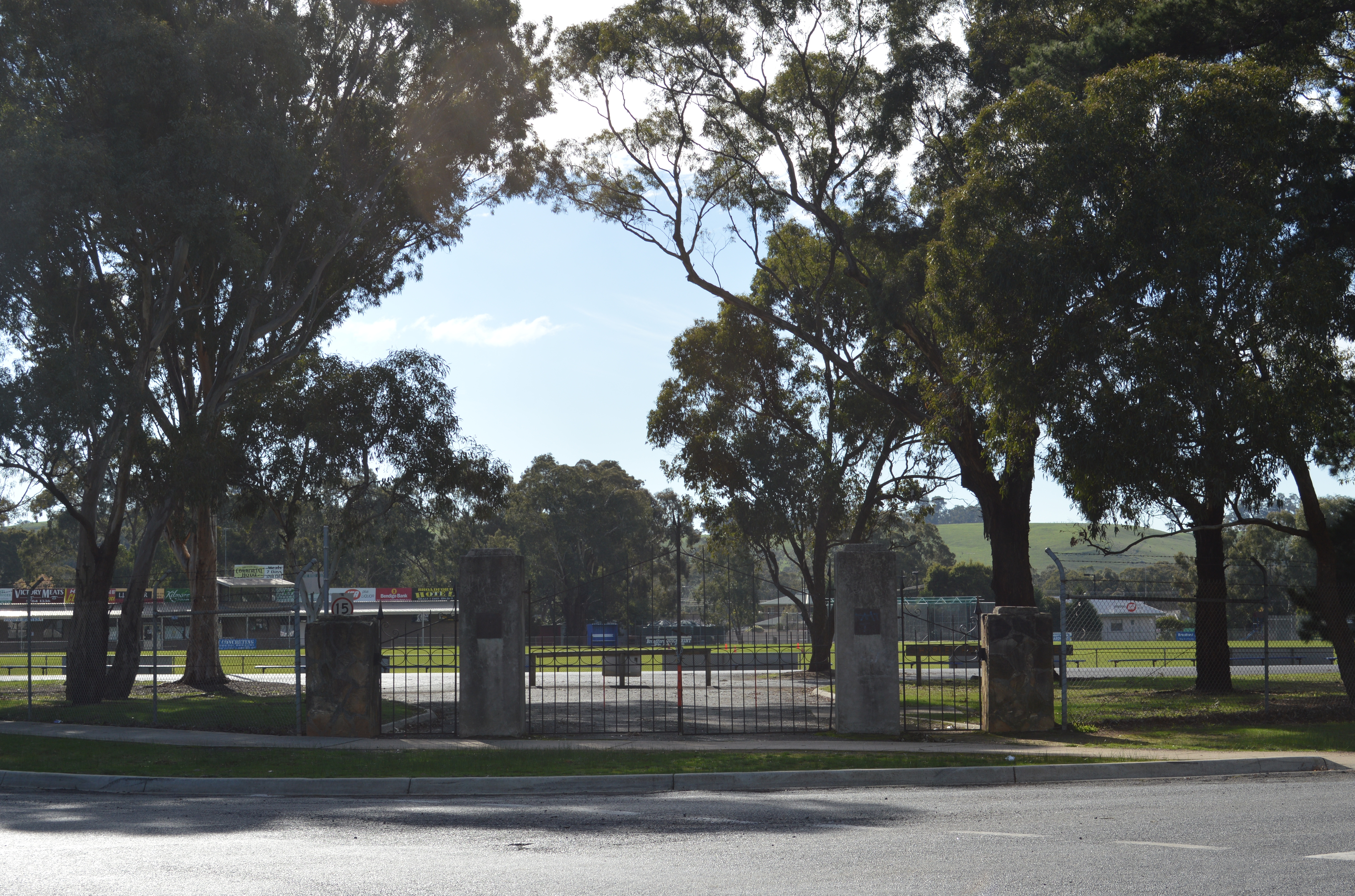
Broadford Recreation Reserve

=== Final ===
Club	Colours	Nickname	Home Ground	Former League	Est.	Years in WNEFA	WNEFA Senior Premierships		Fate
Club	Colours	Nickname	Home Ground	Former League	Est.	Years in WNEFA	Total	Years	Fate
Alexandra		Rebels	Alexandra Showgrounds, Alexandra	ADFA, MAFA	1872	1927–1935, 1947–1976	5	1931, 1952, 1956, 1960, 1962	Moved to Mansfield-Alexandra FA in 1936. Moved to Yarra Valley Mountain District FL in 1977
Broadford		Bombers	Harley Hammond Reserve, Broadford	MFA, HHFA	1890	1921–1938, 1947–1976	11	1924, 1925, 1926, 1927, 1929, 1930, 1949, 1971, 1972, 1973, 1974	Entered recess in 1939; re-formed a year later in Hume Highway FA. Moved to Riddell District FL in 1977
Mansfield		Blues	Mansfield Recreation Reserve, Mansfield	UGFL	1880s	1947–1976	4	1951, 1963, 1954, 1955	Moved to Tungamah FL in 1977
Thornton-Eildon District (Thornton-Acheron Valley 1949–56)		Shinboners	Thornton Recreation Reserve, Thornton	–	1949	1949–1976	1	1961	Moved to Yarra Valley Mountain District FL in 1977
Yea	(1935)(?-1976)	Tigers	Yea Showgrounds, Yea	A&YFA, UGFL	1893	1924–1938, 1947–1976	3	1950, 1968, 1976	Moved to Mansfield-Alexandra FA in 1939. Moved to Yarra Valley Mountain District FL in 1977

=== Former ===
Club	Colours	Nickname	Home Ground	Former League	Est.	Years in WNEFA	WNEFA Senior Premierships		Fate
Club	Colours	Nickname	Home Ground	Former League	Est.	Years in WNEFA	Total	Years	Fate
Avenel	(1930s)(?-1955)	Swans	Avenel Recreation Reserve, Avenel	NEFA	1881	1913–1955	3	1921, 1932, 1933	Merged with Longwood to form Avenel Longwood after 1955 season. Re-formed in Kyabram District FL in 1976
Avenel-Longwood				–	1956	1956–1969	0	–	Folded when Longwood re-formed in 1970
Bonnie Doon		Bulldogs	Bonnie Doon Recreation Reserve, Bonnie Doon	HHFA	1885	1953–1964	0	–	Moved to Benalla & District FL in 1965
Euroa		Magpies	Euroa Memorial Oval, Euroa	NEFA, E&DFA, GVFL	1880	1913–1930, 1934–1938, 1947–1970	12	1913, 1922, 1936, 1937, 1957, 1958, 1963, 1964, 1965, 1967, 1969, 1970	Played in Euroa & District FA between 1931–33. Moved to Goulburn Valley FL in 1939 and 1971
Kilmore		Blues	JJ Clancy Reserve, Kilmore	MFA, RDFL	1873	1921–1931, 1933–1937	0	–	Played in Riddell District FL in 1932. Moved to Hume Highway FA in 1938
Longwood		Redlegs	Longwood Recreation Reserve, Longwood	E&DFA, HHFA	1888	1919, 1955	0	–	Merged with Avenel to form Avenel Longwood after 1955 season. Re-formed in Benalla & District FL in 1970
Murchison			Murchison Recreation Reserve, Murchison	GVFA	1879	1913–1914	1	1914	Recess during WWI, re-formed in Goulburn Valley FL in 1919
Seymour	(?-1963)(1964–75)	Lions	Kings Park, Seymour	NEFA, GVFL	1880	1913–1938, 1947–1975	10	1920, 1923, 1928, 1934, 1935, 1947, 1948, 1959, 1966, 1975	Moved to Goulburn Valley FL in 1939 and 1976
Nagambie		Lakers	Nagambie Recreation Reserve, Nagambie	GVFA	1881	1913–1914, 1919–1938	2	1919, 1938	Moved to Goulburn Valley FL in 1939
Strathbogie			Strathbogie Recreation Reserve, Strathbogie	HHFA	1900s	1955–1961	0	–	Moved to Benalla & District FL in 1962
Tallarook				NEFA		1920–1921	0	–	Entered recess in 1922, re-formed in Hume Highway FA in 1934
Yarck			Yarck Recreation Reserve, Yarck	HHFA		1955–1957	0	–	Folded after 1957 season

== WNEFA Grand Finals ==
Seniors

- The John Gordon (MLA) Shield: 1913 – 1926
- The Mick Minogue Shield: 1927 – 1938

Year	Premiers	Score	Runners up	Score	Venue	Coach
1913	Euroa	10.12 – 72	Nagambie	2.6 – 18	Seymour	
1914	Murchison	7.6 – 48	Nagambie	4.8 – 32	Seymour	
1915–18						In recess > World War I
1919	Nagambie*	8.10 – 58	Avenel	6.9 – 45	Seymour	E Caelli
1920	Seymour	5.14 – 44	Nagambie	6.6 – 42	Seymour	
1921	Avenel	6.3 – 39	Broadford	3.9 – 27	Seymour	
1922	Euroa	6.8 – 44	Seymour	3.13 – 31	Seymour	
1923	Seymour*	9.16 – 70	Nagambie	3.16 – 34	Avenel	Seymour Premiers and Champions
1924	Broadford	8.14 – 62	Seymour	5.12 – 42	Avenel	
1925	Broadford	8.18 – 66	Seymour	8.9- 57	Avenel	
1926	Broadford	10.16 – 76	Seymour	8.16 – 64	Nagambie	Broadford Premiers and Champions
1927	Broadford	20.9 – 129	Seymour	16.8 – 104	Avenel	
1928	Seymour	16.15 – 111	Alexandra	14.9 – 93	Broadford	
1929	Broadford	13.12 – 90	Yea	12.5 – 77	Nagambie	
1930	Broadford	13.11 – 89	Alexandra	8.10 – 58	Seymour	
1931	Alexandra	15.12 – 102	Nagambie	8.12 – 66	Broadford	F Keppel
1932	Avenel	14.13 – 97	Alexandra	11.6 – 72	Nagambie	
1933	Avenel	9.13 – 67	Nagambie	5.8 – 38	Seymour	
1934	Seymour	20.16 – 136	Kilmore	11.23 – 89	Broadford	
1935	Seymour	16.13 – 109	Alexandra	7.12 – 54	Yea	
1936	Euroa	14.22 – 106	Nagambie	14.19 – 103	Avenel	
1937	Euroa	9.20 – 74	Yea	4.11 – 35	Nagambie	
1938	Nagambie*	15.9 – 99	Yea	10.9 – 69	Seymour	
1939						WNEFA in recess
1940–46						In recess > World War II
1947	Seymour	16.26 – 122	Yea	15.9 – 99	Avenel	
1948	Seymour	7.20 – 62	Euroa	9.6 – 60	Avenel	
1949	Broadford	10.13 – 73	Thornton-AV	10.10 – 70	Euroa	
1950	Yea	9.10 – 64	Seymour	6.5 – 35	Euroa	John McLeish
1951	Mansfield	16.7 – 103	Euroa	13.10 – 88	Seymour	Ted Leehane
1952	Alexandra	10.13 – 73	Mansfield	10.7 – 68	Euroa	Jack Cotter
1953	Mansfield	13.12 – 90	Alexandra	7.5 – 47	Euroa	Ted Leehane
1954	Mansfield	10.13 – 73	Seymour	5.7 – 37	Euroa	Ted Leehane
1955	Mansfield	12.15 – 87	Euroa	11.12 – 78		Ted Leehane
1956	Alexandra	10.4 – 64	Seymour	9.7 – 61	Yea	Ian Alexander
1957	Euroa	12.11 – 83	Mansfield	9.7 – 61		Bob Bosustow
1958	Euroa	13.18 – 96	Thornton-E	5.12 – 42		Bob Bosustow
1959	Seymour	10.11 – 71	Broadford	7.14 – 56		Alan Pickering
1960	Alexandra	8.11 – 59	Seymour	8.10 – 58	Yea	Ian Alexander
1961	Thornton-E	12.8 – 80	Yea	8.16 – 64	Alexandra	Eddie Jackson
1962	Alexandra	9.10 – 64	Avenel	6.12 – 48	Seymour	Ian Alexander
1963	Euroa*	9.8 – 62	Thornton-E	7.14 – 56		Dick O'Bree
1964	Euroa	9.12 – 66	Seymour	7.10 – 52		Dick O'Bree
1965	Euroa	9.7 – 61	Alexandra	8.10 – 58	Seymour	Dick O'Bree
1966	Seymour	10.14 – 74	Yea	9.14 – 68		Ian Shelton
1967	Euroa	12.14 – 86	Seymour	8.6 – 54		Dick O'Bree
1968	Yea	15.11 – 101	Seymour	11.8 – 74		
1969	Euroa*	22.13 – 145	Seymour	10.7 – 67		Dick O'Bree
1970	Euroa	18.14 – 122	Seymour	8.13 – 61		Dick O'Bree
1971	Broadford	12.17 – 89	Seymour	6.11 – 47		Mike Howe
1972	Broadford	12.10 – 82	Seymour	10.11 – 71		John Spargo
1973	Broadford	17.15 – 117	Seymour	15.4 – 94		John Spargo
1974	Broadford	10.15 – 75	Seymour	4.10 – 34		John Spargo
1975	Seymour	10.12 – 72	Mansfield	9.13 – 67		Ronnie Gratton
1976	Yea	12.15 – 87	Mansfield	13.5 – 83		
Year	Premiers	Score	Runner Up	Score	Venue	Coach

- – 1919 & 1938: Nagambie undefeated. 1923: Seymour undefeated. 1926 Broadford undefeated. 1963 & 1969 – Euroa undefeated.

Reserves

Year	Premiers	Score	Runners up	Score	Venue	Coach
1951	Alexandra	14.9 – 93	Euroa	6.8 – 32	Avenel	
1952	Seymour	11.13 – 79	Alexandra	7.13 – 55	Euroa	
1953	Seymour	11.11 – 77	Mansfield	8.8 – 56	Euroa	
1954	Seymour	12.17 – 89	Mansfield	5.10 – 40	Euroa	
1955	Broadford	12.18 – 90	Euroa	5.6 – 36		
1956	Bonnie Doon	11.5 – 71	Broadford	10.9 – 69	Yea	
1957	Bonnie Doon	10.12 – 72	Strathbogie	4.8 – 32		
1958	Bonnie Doon	16.16 – 112	Euroa	2.9 – 21		
1959	Seymour	13.10 – 88	Bonnie Doon	10.11 – 71		
1960	Yea	7.5 – 47	Bonnie Doon	4.8 – 32	Yea	
1961	Bonnie Doon	9.11 – 65	Seymour	7.15 – 57		
1962	Bonnie Doon	8.5 – 53	Seymour	7.6 – 48	Seymour	
1963	Euroa	14.12 – 96	Bonnie Doon	5.7 – 37		
1964	Euroa*	8.10 – 58	Bonnie Doon	4.3 – 27		
1965	Euroa	12.11 – 83	Seymour	8.5 – 53	Seymour	
1966	Euroa	12.13 – 85	Seymour	8.10 – 58		
1967	Seymour	11.13 – 79	Euroa	6.13 – 49		
1968	Euroa	15.12 – 102	Seymour	9.11 – 65		
1969	Seymour	10.7 – 67	Euroa	9.8 – 62		
1970						
1971	Broadford	13.7 – 85	Mansfield	10.15 – 75		
1972	Broadford	11.15 – 81	Mansfield	7.15 – 57		
1973	Seymour	10.18 – 78	Broadford	9.6 – 60		
1974	Seymour	12.9 – 81	Broadford	11.9 – 75		
1975	Seymour					
1976						

- – 1964: Euroa were undefeated premiers

Thirds

- Waranga North East JUNIOR Football Association: 1925 & 1926
- Graham Diggle Shield. 1961 – 1976

Year	Premiers	Score	Runners up	Score	Venue	Coach
	Waranga North East JUNIOR Football Association: 1925 & 1926					
1925	Seymour Imperials*	7.5 – 47	Seymour Rovers	7.3 – 45		
1926	Seymour Imperials	14.4 – 88	Seymour Rovers	9.8 – 62		
	Graham Diggle Shield. 1961 – 1976					
1961	Alexandra	8.9 – 57	Euroa	5.13 – 43	Alexandra	
1962	Broadford	17.13 – 115	Alexandra	4.2 – 26	Yea	
1963	Broadford*	17.17 – 119	Alexandra	1.1 – 7	Avenel	
1964	Euroa	15.11 – 101	Broadford	4.9 – 33	Avenel	
1965	Broadford	11.8 – 74	Euroa	10.8 – 68	Seymour	
1966	Broadford	14.23 – 107	Euroa	12.10 – 82	Avenel	L Roberts
1967						
1968						
1969	Euroa*					Peter Hodges
1970						
1971						
1972						
1973						
1974						
1975						
1976						

- – 1925: Seymour Imperials were undefeated premiers.
- – 1963: Broadford lost the premiership on a protest from Alexandra, as Broadford played an ineligible player.
- – 1969: Euroa were undefeated premiers.

== Most Premierships ==
Most Senior Premierships / Runners Up

Club	Most Premierships	Runner up	Total
Euroa	12	3	15
Broadford	11	2	13
Seymour	10	18	28
Alexandra	5	6	11
Mansfield	4	4	8
Yea	3	6	9
Avenel	3	2	5
Nagambie	2	7	9
Thornton Eildon	1	2	3
Murchison	1	0	1
Kilmore	0	1	1
Thornton Acheron Valley	0	1	1
Total	52	52	104

== Best and Fairest Award Winners ==
The initial best and fairest award was donated by the Kia Ora company in 1948. Then Mr. Keith D. Bryant, a local Yea businessman and councillor, donated the WNEFA best and award trophy from 1949 onwards. Bryant was also Vice President of the WNEFA in 1950, under President, Harry Alexander. and President in 1951.

	WNEFA SENIOR Football – Best & Fairest Award					
Year	Winner	Club	Votes	Second	Club	Votes
Kia Ora – Best & Fairest Trophy
1948	Alan Willis	Avenel				
Keith D. Bryant – Best & Fairest Trophy
1949	Jim Bradley	Alexandra	21	D. Bill Reardon	Mansfield	20
1950	Allen Rogers	Yea	32	Arthur Frost	Euroa	20
1951	Arthur Frost	Euroa	19	Alan Willis	Avenel	17
1952	Jim Bradley	Alexandra	20	D. Bill Reardon	Mansfield	13
1953	Jim Bradley	Alexandra	15	D. Bill Reardon	Mansfield	14
	Alan Willis*	Avenel	15			
1954	Alf Harrison &	Seymour	22	R. Bob Suter	Broadford	15
	Alan Willis	Avenel	22			
1955	Les Reed	Euroa				
1956	Geoff Baker*	Avenel	21	Kevin Parks &	Broadford	20
				D. Bill Reardon	Mansfield	20
1957	Ian Hughes	Euroa		D. Bill Reardon	Mansfield	
1958	Peter Brodie	Euroa	19	Ian "Bluey" Shelton	Avenel	16
1959	Ian Hughes	Thornton	23	Geoff Baker &	Avenel	20
				Ray Preston	Seymour	20
1960	Ian Hughes	Thornton	20	David Grubb	Broadford	9
1961	David Grubb	Broadford	29	Bernie McCarthy	Yea	21
1962	Dick O'Bree	Euroa	23	A "Drew" Coller	Alexandra	19
1963	Ross Coller	Thornton				
1964	Geoff Kirby	Broadford	26	A "Drew" Coller	Alexandra	14
1965	A "Drew" Coller	Alexandra				
1966	Peter Tossol Snr	Thornton	26	"Mocca" Elliott	Broadford	16
1967						
1968	HG "Hassa" Dundas	Alexandra				
1969						
1970	John Bordignon	Broadford				
1971	John Bordignon	Broadford				
1972						
1973						
1974						
1975						
1976						

- – 1953: Alan Willis (Avenel) finished as runner up under the old count back system.
- – 1956: Geoff Baker was the father of former Avenel and Essendon player, Leon Baker.
- – 1957: Ian Hughes, also won the 1958 Kyabram & District Football League best and fairest award, playing with Miepol FC. Father of former international cricketer, Merv Hughes.
- – 1966: Peter Tossol Snr was the father of former Melbourne players, John Tossol and Peter Tossol junior.

	WNEFA RESERVES Football – Best & Fairest Award					
Year	Winner	Club	Votes	Second	Club	Votes
1951	Claude Rogers	Yea	13	W Davidson	Euroa	12
1952	Alf Wilson	Alexandra	15			
1953	Vic Hewitt	Alexandra	14	D Symonds	Yea	12
1954	K Doolan	Mansfield	24	N Lockhart	Bonnie Doon	12
1955	Phil Arbothnot	Bonnie Doon				
1956	Ivan Fox	Yarck	15	J Symons	Seymour	14
1957	Keith Higgins	Yarck				
1958	Vin Hall	Seymour	16	J Ilott	Strathbogie	14
1959						
1960	W Ned Arbothnot	Bonnie Doon	15			
1961	D. Bill Reardon	Bonnie Doon	25	R Lockhart	Bonnie Doon	18
1962	D. Bill Reardon	Bonnie Doon				
1963	D. Bill Reardon	Bonnie Doon				
1964						
1965	J Brock	Seymour				
1966	D. Bill Reardon	Mansfield				
1967	EN Ted Phelps	Alexandra				
1968	John Mullins	Alexandra				
1969						
1970						
1971	Kevin Hedger	Alexandra				
1972						
1973						
1974						
1975						
1976						

	WNEFA THIRDS Football – Best & Fairest Award					
Year	Winner	Club	Votes	Second	Club	Votes
1961	H G Hassa Dundas	Alexandra				
1962						
1963	Les Stillman	Alexandra				
1964	Les Stillman	Alexandra				
1965	Phillip Dundas	Alexandra				
1966	Loughran	Yea				
1967	Rod Nilbert	Alexandra				
1968						
1969						
1970						
1971						
1972						
1973						
1974						
1975						
1976	Peter Norris	Alexandra				

== Senior Leading Goal Kicking Winners ==
Seniors

	Waranga North East FL. Senior Football: Leading / Century Goalkickers		
Year	Winner	Club	Season Goals
1951	Wally Nash	Euroa	74
1952	Wally Nash	Euroa	88
1953	Alan Jewell	Mansfield	
1954	Alan Jewell	Mansfield	102
1955	Dick O'Bree	Euroa	97
1956	Alan White	Avenel	74
1957	Dick O'Bree	Euroa	93
1958	R McCarthur	Thornton	56
1959	Bruce Birney	Broadford	62
1960			
1961	Tony Payne	Alexandra	60
1962	Tony Payne	Alexandra	51
1963	Dick O'Bree	Euroa	55
1964	D Aldous	Yea	
1965	Alan Pickering	Seymour	
1966	Don Aldous	Yea	111
1967	Don Aldous	Yea	117
1968	Don Aldous	Yea	103
1969	Don Aldous	Yea	93
1970	E Wallace	Avenel	116
1971			
1972	Kevin Hedger	Alexandra	70
1973	Ray Stowmann	Seymour	91
1974	Ray Stowmann	Seymour	73
1975			
1976	E Wearne	Yea	47

== WNEFA Inter-league matches ==
- 1933 – GVFL: 11.21 – 87 d WNEFA: 7.10 – 52
- 1949 – GVFL: 14.19 – 103 d WNEFA: 6.9 – 45
- 1950 – Murray Football League: 11.16 – 82 d WNEFL: 7.7 – 49
- 1951 – WNEFL: 10.17 – 77 d GVFL: 8.26 – 74
- 1961 – GVFL: 19.18 – 132 d WNEFL: 11.13 – 79
- 1963 – WNEFL: d GVFL:8/6/63 at Seymour.
- 1963 – South West FL: 10.14 – 74 d WNEFL: 9.4 – 58 10/6/63 at Shepparton.
- 1965 – WNEFL: 13.20 – 98 drew with South West FL:14.14 – 98, at Seymour. 12/6/65.
- 1965 – South West FL: 15.15 – 105 d WNEFL: 8.14 – 62, at Shepparton. 14 June 1965.
- 1967 – O&MFL: 15.18 – 108 d WNEFL: 7.6 – 48 at the Wangaratta Showgrounds

== Office Bearers ==
The table below contains a list of the NEFA (1891–1912) and WNEFA Office Bearers from 1913 to 1976.

Year	President	Secretary	Treasurer
North Eastern Football Association
1891	C E Wallder	J Howe	W H Tristan
1892		J Howe	
1893	W H Tristan Esq	J Howe	J Gullan
1894	D E Ryan	J Howe	Mr Steele
1895	D E Ryan	J Howe	T Trezise
1896			
1897	A Kaine	J E Henry	
1898	George Sutherland	J E Henry	
1899	George Sutherland	J E Henry	
1900	D McPherson		
1901	J B Bullen	B Allen	
1902	J B Bullen	H W Allen	
1903	J B Butler	H W Allen	
1904			
1905	G Howe		
1906	W Redpath	E O'Connor	E O'Connor
1907			
1908	J M Neill	Mick Minogue	Mick Minogue
1909	F C Osborne	Mick Minogue	Mick Minogue
1910	J P Minogue	Mick Minogue	Mick Minogue
1911	Cr J M Neill. JP	Mick Minogue	Mick Minogue
1912	Mr Withers	Mick Minogue	Mick Minogue
Waranga North East Football Association
1913	E C Parsons	A Reviere	Orpwood
1914	E C Parsons	D J Shewan	
1915–18	WNEFA	in recess >	World War I
1919	P J O'Connor	Mick Minogue	Mick Minogue
1920	P J O'Connor	Mick Minogue	Mick Minogue
1921		Mick Minogue	Mick Minogue
1922	Chris Ryan	Mick Minogue	Mick Minogue
1923	Gus Kesper	Mick Minogue	Mick Minogue
1924	E Hallaway	Mick Minogue	Mick Minogue
1925		Mick Minogue	Mick Minogue
1926	W Tomkins	Mick Minogue	Mick Minogue
1927	C D Ryan	Mick Minogue	Mick Minogue
1928	Dr. Loughnan	Mick Minogue	Mick Minogue
1929	Mr W Gilligan	Mick Minogue	Mick Minogue
1930	J Luttrell	Mick Minogue	Mick Minogue
1931	E Holloway	Mick Minogue	Mick Minogue
1932	W Tomkins &	Mick Minogue	Mick Minogue
	J Lutrill		
1933	A Baxter	Mick Minogue	Mick Minogue
1934	Mr Portsbury	Mick Minogue	Mick Minogue
1935	T Devine	Mick Minogue	Mick Minogue
1936	A Dunne	Mick Minogue	Gus Kesper
1937	D Moore	Mick Minogue	G A Stagg
1938	C Ryan	Mick Minogue	G A Stagg
1939	WNEFA	in recess >	
1940–45	WNEFA	in recess >	World War II
1946	WNEFA	in recess	
1947	B Barry	Bert Hansen	
1948	Gus Kesper	Bert Hansen	
1949			
1950	P T Mitchell		
1955	Harry Hollingshead		
1959	Alan Willis		
1965	H W "Bert" Holcombe	H Hansen	G Diggle

== WNRFL Life Members ==
In a 1966 article in the Broadford Courier, the WNRFL constitution allowed for seven life members and when Dick Tossol received his in 1966, he was the seventh recipient.

Year	Life Member
Waranga North East Football Association
1926	J P Minogue
?	Reg Hunt
1950	K "Gus" Kesper
	Graham Diggle
1960	Bill Burns
1966	Dick Tossol
