= Jim McLean (Australian footballer) =

Australian rules footballer

Personal information
- Full name: James Umpherston McLean
- Born: 2 May 1880; Carlton, Victoria
- Died: 14 August 1917 (aged 37); Narrandera, New South Wales
- Original team: Scotch College/Euroa (NEFA)

Playing career^{1}
Years	Club	Games (Goals)
1901, 1903	Melbourne	13 (5)
- ^{1} Playing statistics correct to the end of 1903.

James Umpherston McLean (2 May 1880 – 14 August 1917) was an Australian rules footballer who played with Melbourne in the Victorian Football League (VFL).
