= Billy Blackman =

Australian rules footballer

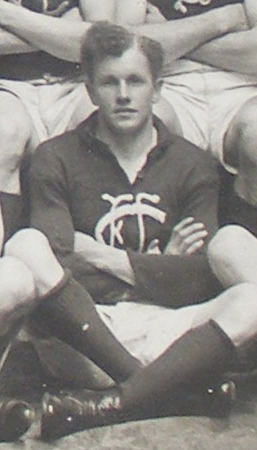
- Blackman in 1921

Personal information
- Full name: William Alfred Blackman
- Born: 6 August 1895; Brunswick, Victoria
- Died: 29 September 1969 (aged 74); Heidelberg, Victoria
- Original team: Brunswick Juniors
- Height: 170 cm (5 ft 7 in)
- Weight: 68 kg (150 lb)

Playing career^{1}
Years	Club	Games (Goals)
1920–24	Carlton	54 (9)
- ^{1} Playing statistics correct to the end of 1924.

William Alfred Blackman (6 August 1895 – 29 September 1969) was an Australian rules footballer who played with Carlton in the Victorian Football League (VFL).

== Family ==
The son of Robert James Blackman (1855-1926), and Margaret Ellen Blackman (1857-1912), née Peterson, William Alfred Blackman was born in Brunswick, Victoria on 6 August 1895.

== Military service ==
He served in the First AIF, enlisting in September 1915. He was wounded in action on three separate occasions. He returned to Australia in December 1918, and was discharged in March 1919.

== Football ==
=== Carlton (VFL) ===
Recruited from Brunswick Juniors, he played 54 games with Carlton over five seasons. He played representative football against New South Wales, in Sydney, on 8 July 1922.

=== Brunswick (VFA) ===
On 20 May 1925, Blackman was cleared from Carlton to play with the Brunswick Football Club in the Victorian Football Association (VFA). Overall, he played 22 games with Brunswick over two seasons (1925-1926), including its 1925 premiership team (he was one of Bruswick's best players); and for a time in 1926, he served as the team's captain.

=== Birchip (NCDFL) ===
On 27 April 1927, Blackman was cleared from Brunswick to play with the Birchip Football Club in the North Central District Football League.

=== Coburg (VFA) ===
He played in two matches for the Coburg Football Club in the VFA competition in 1928.
