= Pat O'Connor (Australian footballer, born 1881) =

Australian rules footballer

Personal information
- Full name: Pat O'Connor
- Born: 20 January 1881
- Died: 12 January 1953 (aged 71)
- Original teams: Mangalore, Avenel

Playing career^{1}
Years	Club	Games (Goals)
1906–07	St Kilda	33 (5)
- ^{1} Playing statistics correct to the end of 1907.

Pat O'Connor (20 January 1881 – 12 January 1953) was an Australian rules footballer who played with St Kilda in the Victorian Football League (VFL) and was recruited from Avenel.
