= Dick O'Bree =

Australian rules footballer and coach (1936–2024)

Personal information
- Full name: Richard John O'Bree
- Born: 5 June 1936; Lake Boga, Victoria, Australia
- Died: 21 January 2024 (aged 87)
- Original team: Euroa / Lake Boga
- Height: 188 cm (6 ft 2 in)
- Weight: 90 kg (198 lb)
- Position: Full-Forward

Playing career^{1}
Years	Club	Games (Goals)
1956–57	Collingwood	4 (5)
- ^{1} Playing statistics correct to the end of 1957.

Career highlights
- Euroa Premiership Captain/Coach: 1963, 64, 65, 67, 69, 70 & 71.; 1962 WNEFA's best & fairest

Richard John O'Bree (5 June 1936 – 21 January 2024) was an Australian rules footballer who played with Collingwood in the Victorian Football League (VFL).

== Early career ==
Originally from Lake Boga, O'Bree made his senior debut as a fifteen year old with his local club and as a seventeen-year-old played in a Lake Boga premiership and kicked 118 goals in the 1953 home and away season with Lake Boga in the Mid Murray Football League, with another 22 in the finals. In 1954 he kicked 94 goals before work took him to Euroa.

== VFL career ==
Collingwood had attempted to lure the young Full-forward for years before O'Bree signed with them on match permits. He played the first three games in 1956 VFL season. In his third game, O'Bree started well, kicking a goal then he collided with Colin Saddington, landed awkwardly and broke his right leg in a match against Richmond at their home ground Punt Road Oval. As there were no stretchers available, O'Bree was carried from the ground on Richmond's training room door.

== Later life ==
After recovering from his broken leg, O'Bree returned to play for Euroa, becoming a record goalkicker and premiership winning coach.

He spent three years from 1959 as captain coach of Wycheproof in the North Central FL before returning permanently to Euroa, winning the 1962 Waranga North East Football Association's best and fairest award, the Keith D. Bryant Trophy.

He retired as a player in 1969 but when Euroa joined the Goulburn Valley Football League in 1971 he was talked into playing. He kicked 59 goals and led Euroa to the premiership before hanging up the boots for good. In a career that spanned 20 years he kicked over 1200 goals and played in eleven premierships, coaching in seven premierships.

O'Bree died on 21 January 2024, at the age of 87.

== Sources ==
- Piesse, K. (2011) Great Australian Football Stories, The Five Mile Press: Melbourne. ISBN 978-1-74346-757-2.
- Dick O'Bree's profile
- Dick O'Bree's playing statistics from AFL Tables
