= Peter Corkran =

Australian rules footballer

Personal information
- Full name: Peter Corkran
- Born: 8 January 1948 (age 78)
- Original team: Avenel
- Height: 175 cm (5 ft 9 in)
- Weight: 73 kg (161 lb)

Playing career^{1}
Years	Club	Games (Goals)
1966	Fitzroy	1 (0)
- ^{1} Playing statistics correct to the end of 1966.

Peter Corkran (born 8 January 1948) is a former Australian rules footballer who played with Fitzroy in the Victorian Football League (VFL).
