= Jarrod Kayler-Thomson =

Australian rules footballer (born 1985)

Personal information
- Full name: Jarrod Kayler-Thomson
- Born: 26 July 1985 (age 41); Geelong
- Original teams: Geelong Falcons (TAC Cup), Mansfield, Perth (WAFL)
- Draft: No. 29, 2010 rookie draft
- Debut: Round 1, 2010, Hawthorn vs. Melbourne, at Melbourne Cricket Ground
- Height: 188 cm (6 ft 2 in)
- Weight: 86 kg (190 lb)
- Position: Midfielder

Club information
- Current club: Northam Federals

Playing career^{1}
Years	Club	Games (Goals)
2005–2009	Perth	88 (103)
2010	Hawthorn	3 (1)
2011–2012	Perth	20 (12)
2013–2014	Subiaco	31 (15)
- ^{1} Playing statistics correct to the end of 2014.

Career highlights
- Perth leading goalkicker: 2007; Western Australian state team: 2008, 2013

Jarrod Kayler-Thomson (born 26 July 1985) is an Australian rules footballer. He had played in the Australian Football League with the Hawthorn Football Club. He currently plays with the Subiaco Football Club in the West Australian Football League.

Kayler-Thomson was teammate of Jordan Lewis, when the two were underage players at the Geelong Falcons in 2003.

Kayler-Thomson joined the Perth in the West Australian Football League (WAFL) and played 88 games for them between 2005 and 2009. He won the Vince Pendal Award for best clubman in 2009. Kayler-Thomson was the leading goalkicker for Perth in 2007 with 41 goals.

In the 2008 Queensland versus WAFL match in Townsville, Kayler-Thomson was listed as best on ground.

Drafted to the Hawks with the 29th selection of the 2010 AFL Rookie Draft, Kayler-Thomson was elevated to the senior list prior to the opening round of the 2010 AFL season due to a spate of injuries to senior players.

He debuted against Melbourne in the opening game of the 2010 season collecting 6 marks and 17 disposals.

Hawthorn delisted him at the end of the 2010 season so he returned to Perth.

He reached his 100th game upon returning in 2011 before then missing all but two matches in 2012 due to a shoulder injury. That gave him a chance to reflect and realise he wanted a fresh start in the WAFL, and that's how he ended up at Subiaco.

== Statistics ==
Legend
G	Goals	K	Kicks	D	Disposals	T	Tackles
B	Behinds	H	Handballs	M	Marks

Season	Team	No.	Games	Totals							Averages (per game)							Votes
Season	Team	No.	Games	G	B	K	H	D	M	T	G	B	K	H	D	M	T	Votes
2010	Hawthorn	45	3	1	2	30	24	54	18	5	0.3	0.7	10.0	8.0	18.0	6.0	1.7	0
Career			3	1	2	30	24	54	18	5	0.3	0.7	10.0	8.0	18.0	6.0	1.7	0
