= Les Reed (footballer) =

Australian rules footballer (1932–2021)

Personal information
- Full name: Leslie George Reed
- Born: 16 August 1932; Yea, Victoria
- Died: 25 May 2021 (aged 88); Euroa, Victoria
- Original team: Euroa
- Height: 178 cm (5 ft 10 in)
- Weight: 74 kg (163 lb)

Playing career^{1}
Years	Club	Games (Goals)
1951–1953	Geelong	25 (3)
- ^{1} Playing statistics correct to the end of 1953.

Leslie George Reed (16 August 1932 – 25 May 2021) was an Australian rules footballer who played for Geelong in the VFL during the early 1950s.

== Family ==
The son of Thomas William Reed (1907–1992), and Dorothy Jean Reed (1912–2006), née Mortimer, Leslie George Reed was born at Yea, Victoria on 16 August 1932.

He married Joan "Mickey" Heathcote (1931–2015) on 9 October 1954.

== Football ==
Geelong (VFL)

Reed was a utility player and was recruited from Euroa.

He was the 19th man for the Geelong's 1951 premiership side that defeated the Essendon team that played without the suspended John Coleman, 11.15 (81) to 10.10 (70) -- he replaced the injured Loy Stewart during the match—and he also played on the wing when Geelong lost to Collingwood, 8.17 (65) to 11.11 (77) in the 1953 Grand Final.

Reed returned to play with Euroa in 1954 in the Waranga North East Football Association and was appointed as Euroa's captain-coach in 1955 and also won the 1955 WNEFA best and fairest award.

Reed also played 49 games with Benalla over three years, coached Violet Town in 1968 and 1969.

Reed played 150 games with Euroa, including premierships in 1964, 1965 and 1967.
