= George Pattison (footballer) =

Australian rules footballer

Personal information
- Full name: George Alphonsus Pattison
- Born: 14 July 1889; Shepparton, Victoria
- Died: 6 March 1951 (aged 61); Hawthorn, Victoria
- Original team: Euroa
- Height: 180 cm (5 ft 11 in)
- Weight: 87 kg (192 lb)

Playing career^{1}
Years	Club	Games (Goals)
1914–15, 1917	Fitzroy	8 (0)
- ^{1} Playing statistics correct to the end of 1917.

George Alphonsus Pattison (14 July 1889 – 6 March 1951) was an Australian rules footballer who played with Fitzroy in the Victorian Football League (VFL).
