= Harry Toole =

Australian rules footballer

Personal information
- Full name: Harry Toole
- Born: 7 September 1897
- Died: 13 August 1958 (aged 60)
- Original team: Carlton Juniors
- Height: 179 cm (5 ft 10 in)
- Weight: 79 kg (174 lb)
- Position: Follower / defender

Playing career^{1}
Years	Club	Games (Goals)
1921–25	Carlton	60 (21)
- ^{1} Playing statistics correct to the end of 1925.

Harry Toole (7 September 1897 – 13 August 1958) was an Australian rules footballer who played with Carlton in the Victorian Football League (VFL).
