= Croft McKenzie =

Australian rules footballer (1894–1927)

Personal information
- Full name: Crofton Ritchie McKenzie
- Born: 17 February 1894; Tallygaroopna, Victoria
- Died: 11 November 1927 (aged 33); Numurkah, Victoria
- Original team: Numurkah
- Height: 178 cm (5 ft 10 in)
- Weight: 75 kg (165 lb)
- Position: Centre

Playing career^{1}
Years	Club	Games (Goals)
1920–23	Carlton	21 (0)
- ^{1} Playing statistics correct to the end of 1923.

Crofton Ritchie McKenzie (17 February 1894 – 11 November 1927) was an Australian rules footballer who played with Carlton in the Victorian Football League (VFL).

He died at the young age of 33 on 11 November 1927 in Numurkah, some months after suffering a ruptured spleen in a football match.
