= Bob Suter (Australian footballer) =

Australian rules footballer (1928–2016)

- Suter during his Essendon career

Personal information
- Born: 9 June 1928
- Died: 17 September 2016 (aged 88)
- Original team: Broadford
- Height: 173 cm (5 ft 8 in)
- Weight: 76 kg (168 lb)

Playing career^{1}
Years	Club	Games (Goals)
1956–1958	Essendon	22 (0)
- ^{1} Playing statistics correct to the end of 1958.

Bob Suter (9 June 1928 – 17 September 2016) was an Australian rules footballer in the Victorian Football League (VFL).

Recruited from Broadford where he was runner up in the 1954 Waranga North East Football Association best and fairest award, the Keith D. Bryant Trophy. Suter also won Broadford's club best and fairest award in 1953 and 1954.

Suter was a back pocket in the losing Essendon team against Melbourne in the 1957 VFL Grand Final and featured in the famous 1957 VFL grand final photo of Bob tackling Ron Barassi.

Suter later played with Kyneton in the Bendigo Football League, prior to returning to play with Broadford, where he won the club's 1963 best and fairest award.
