= Peter Keays =

Australian rules footballer

Personal information
- Full name: Peter Keays
- Born: 4 September 1955 (age 71)
- Original team: Broadford
- Height: 180 cm (5 ft 11 in)
- Weight: 81.5 kg (180 lb)
- Position: Backman

Playing career^{1}
Years	Club	Games (Goals)
1974–77	Melbourne	40 (4)
1978–81	Fitzroy	49 (4)
Total		89 (8)
- ^{1} Playing statistics correct to the end of 1981.

Peter Keays (born 4 September 1955) is a former Australian rules footballer who played with Melbourne and Fitzroy in the Victorian Football League (VFL).
