= Brian Morrison (footballer) =

Australian rules footballer (1938–2020)

Personal information
- Full name: Brian Joseph Morrison
- Born: 14 July 1938; Longwood, Victoria
- Died: 23 December 2020 (aged 82); Benalla, Victoria
- Original team: Avenel Football Club
- Height: 180 cm (5 ft 11 in)
- Weight: 80 kg (176 lb)

Playing career^{1}
Years	Club	Games (Goals)
1960	Richmond	6 (0)
- ^{1} Playing statistics correct to the end of 1960.

Brian Joseph Morrison (14 July 1938 – 23 December 2020) was an Australian rules footballer who played with Richmond in the Victorian Football League (VFL).

== Family ==
His grandson, Harry Morrison, plays for Hawthorn in the Australian Football League.

== Football ==
Recruited from Avenel Football Club, where he had played from 1956 to 1959, in 1960, he only played with Richmond for a single season before returning to Euroa, where he worked as a sheep shearer.

He played in six First XVIII matches and in seven Second XVIII matches as a centreman.

According to Hogan (1996, p.153) he was captain-coach of the Violet Town Football Club in 1964.

== Shearer ==
He won the Australian Open Shearing title twice — in 1967 and 1968 — and, on 11 February 1972, at the RSL Hall in Euroa, Victoria, he set an Australian record by shearing 410 sheep in a day (i.e., under eight hours).

He was inducted into the Shearers Hall of Fame in 2019.
