= Kevin Green (Australian footballer) =

Australian rules footballer (born 1935)

Personal information
- Full name: Kevin Green
- Born: 16 January 1935 (age 91)
- Original team: Broadford
- Height: 180 cm (5 ft 11 in)
- Weight: 74 kg (163 lb)
- Position: Defender

Playing career^{1}
Years	Club	Games (Goals)
1957–58	Essendon	4 (0)
- ^{1} Playing statistics correct to the end of 1958.

Kevin Green (born 16 January 1935) is a former Australian rules footballer who played with Essendon in the Victorian Football League (VFL). After his two season with Essendon, Green returned to his original club, Broadford.
