= Trent Hotton =

Australian rules footballer (born 1973)

Personal information
- Full name: Trent Hotton
- Born: 1 December 1973 (age 52)
- Original team: Warragul/Preston
- Draft: 28th, 1994 Pre-Season draft
- Height: 193 cm (6 ft 4 in)
- Weight: 90 kg (198 lb)

Playing career^{1}
Years	Club	Games (Goals)
1994–96	Collingwood	17 (14)
2000–02	Carlton	61 (36)
Total		78 (50)
- ^{1} Playing statistics correct to the end of 2002.

Trent Hotton (born 1 December 1973) is an Australian rules footballer who played with Collingwood and Carlton in the Australian Football League (AFL).

== Playing career ==
Collingwood picked up Hotton, from Preston, with the 28th pick of the 1994 Pre-Season draft. A key position player who took turns in the ruck, he couldn't break into the seniors until late in the year but played seven games in his debut season, including a Qualifying Final. He was not often picked over the next two seasons but did manage four goals and 17 disposals in a game against the Brisbane Bears at the Gabba in 1996. It would however turn out to be Hotton's last season at Collingwood, as he was dismissed by coach Tony Shaw in early 1997 for turning up drunk to training. The previous year he had been one of three Collingwood players charged with affray following an altercation with security at a Melbourne nightclub, for which he was fined $5000.

Hotton continued playing football, at East Burwood, before making a surprise return to the AFL in 2000 after being picked up by Carlton with pick 86 in the 1999 AFL draft. He played in all 25 games for Carlton in 2000, three of them finals. The former Collingwood player appeared in finals again the following season and missed just two games all year. He had a career best 29 disposals in a game against Essendon but Carlton had a poor season with only three wins and Hotton was delisted at the end of the year.

After leaving the AFL, Hotton went to Mansfield in the Goulburn Valley Football Netball League and in 2004 took home the Wilf Cox Medal after being best afield in their Grand Final win. He also won a Morrison Medal, in 2007, as the league's 'Best & Fairest' player. Hotton joined Tooronga Malvern in 2010.
