= George Weatherill (footballer) =

Australian rules footballer

Personal information
- Full name: George Alexander Weatherill
- Born: 23 May 1900; Kew, Victoria
- Died: 27 February 1986 (aged 85); Bulleen, Victoria
- Original team: Camberwell Juniors
- Height: 183 cm (6 ft 0 in)
- Weight: 80.5 kg (177 lb)

Playing career^{1}
Years	Club	Games (Goals)
1919–1923	Richmond	53 (5)
- ^{1} Playing statistics correct to the end of 1923.

Career highlights
- Richmond Premiership Player 1921; Interstate games: 1

George Alexander Weatherill (23 May 1900 – 27 February 1986) was an Australian rules footballer who played in the VFL between 1919 and 1923 for the Richmond Football Club.
