= Peter Barran =

Australian rules footballer

Personal information
- Full name: Peter Barran
- Born: 30 December 1936
- Died: 20 March 2008
- Original team: Mansfield
- Height: 185 cm (6 ft 1 in)
- Weight: 80 kg (176 lb)

Playing career^{1}
Years	Club	Games (Goals)
1957	Geelong	5 (0)
- ^{1} Playing statistics correct to the end of 1957.

Peter Barran (born 30 December 1936) is a former Australian rules footballer who played with Geelong in the Victorian Football League (VFL).
