= Bill Reardon (footballer) =

Australian rules footballer (1928–2004)

Personal information
- Full name: Desmond Dennis Reardon
- Born: 30 October 1928; Mansfield, Victoria
- Died: 15 September 2004 (aged 75)
- Original team: Mansfield
- Height: 183 cm (6 ft 0 in)
- Weight: 85 kg (187 lb)

Playing career^{1}
Years	Club	Games (Goals)
1950–52	Footscray	20 (10)
- ^{1} Playing statistics correct to the end of 1952.

Desmond Dennis "Bill" Reardon (30 October 1928 – 15 September 2004) was an Australian rules footballer who played with Footscray in the Victorian Football League (VFL).

Reardon played 13 VFL games in 1950 and six in 1951, then returned to Mansfield, but managed to play one VFL match in 1952.

Reardon was recruited from the Mansfield Football Club and was runner up in Waranga North East Football Association best and fairest award, the KD Bryant Trophy in 1949, 1952, 1953, 1956 and 1957.

Reardon was a member of Mansfield's four Waranga North East Football Association premierships in 1951, 1953, 1954 and 1955.

Reardon was captain-coach of the Bonnie Doon Football Club senior team in the Waranga North East Football Association Reserves competition between 1961 and 1963 and again in 1967, winning premierships in 1961 and 1962 and runner up in 1963.

He also won three consecutive Waranga & North East Football League Reserves competition best and fairest awards in 1961, 1962 and 1963. In 1964, Reardon finished third.

Reardon won the 1966 Waranga & North East Football League Reserves competition best and fairest again in 1966, but was back playing with Mansfield Football Club.
