= Norm Turnbull =

Australian rules footballer and horse trainer

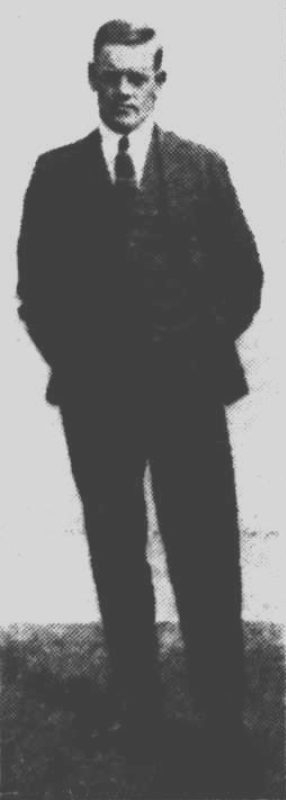

Personal information
- Full name: Norman Alfred Turnbull
- Born: 15 June 1894
- Died: 19 July 1977 (aged 83)
- Original team: Yarra Park School
- Height: 169 cm (5 ft 7 in)
- Weight: 66 kg (146 lb)

Playing career^{1}
Years	Club	Games (Goals)
1914–1920	St Kilda	31 (14)
1921–1923	Richmond	34 (25)
Total		65 (39)
- ^{1} Playing statistics correct to the end of 1923.

Career highlights
- Richmond Premiership Player 1921

Norman Turnbull (15 June 1894 – 19 July 1977) was an Australian rules footballer who played for St Kilda Football Club and Richmond Football Club in the VFL and horse trainer in both Melbourne and Sydney.

After growing up in Richmond, Turnbull commenced his senior football career with St Kilda in 1914, making eight appearances in his first season. He was reported as having enlisted in late 1915 although there are no official service records under his name in the official archives.

In 1918, Turnbull returned to senior football, playing the first eight rounds before being excluded from the team by the St Kilda committee “in the best interests of the team, owing to his play”. He was reinstated late in the 1920 season and played two more games for St Kilda before moving to Richmond for the 1921 VFL season. In his first game against his old club he was reported for striking Bill Woodcock and suspended for four matches, but returned to the team, kicking the winning goal in the Grand Final as Richmond won their second VFL premiership.

After football Turnbull became a successful horse trainer, later moving to Sydney.
