= Les Stillman =

Australian rules footballer (born 1949)

- Born: William Leslie Stillman; 5 October 1949 (age 77); Alexandra, Victoria, Australia
- Cricket career

Cricket information
- Batting: Right-handed
- Role: Batsman

Domestic team information
- Years: Team
- 1970/71–1975/76: Victoria
- 1977/78: South Australia

Career statistics
Competition	First-class	List A
Matches	28	3
Runs scored	1,299	29
Batting average	24.98	9.66
100s/50s	0/9	0/0
Top score	88*	23
Balls bowled	40	56
Wickets	0	2
Bowling average	–	25.00
5 wickets in innings	–	0
10 wickets in match	–	0
Best bowling	–	2/50
Catches/stumpings	20/0	3/0
- Source: CricketArchive, 5 November 2022
Australian rules football career
Personal information
- Height: 183 cm (6 ft 0 in)
- Weight: 78 kg (172 lb)
- Position: Forward
Playing career^{1}
Years	Club	Games (Goals)
1968–1970	Essendon	24 (32)
1971	Footscray	3 (1)
1971–1975	Williamstown (VFA)	64 (114)
1975–1977	Coburg (VFA)	22 (30)
- ^{1} Playing statistics correct to the end of 1977.

William Leslie Stillman (born 5 October 1949) is a former Australian first-class cricketer who represented Victoria and South Australia. He also played Australian rules football for Essendon and Footscray in the Victorian Football League (VFL).

== Football career ==
Originally from Alexandra, where he won the 1963 and 1964 Waranga North East Football Association Thirds best and fairest award. During his time as a VFL footballer Les Stillman played mainly as a half forward. After making his league debut in 1968, Stillman was a semi regular in the Essendon team in 1969 and 1970. His best performance in a game came against Carlton in the opening round of the 1970 VFL season when he kicked six goals.

Stillman crossed to Footscray in 1971 and played three senior games there. He then captained Williamstown in the Victorian Football Association (VFA) until 1975, twice placing in the J. J. Liston Trophy count (third in 1973 and second in 1974), and winning the club best and fairest in 1972 and 1973. He resigned the captaincy during 1975 after a disagreement with club hierarchy over the ongoing tenure of coach Ted Whitten, and was cleared to Coburg, where he played the rest of his VFA career.

== Cricket career ==
His cricket career had begun with a solitary first-class match in 1970/71 but it was not until after leaving the VFL that he established a place in the Victorian Sheffield Shield team. A right-handed middle order batsman, he broke into the side again in 1974/75 and had a solid season with 451 runs at 30.06. He remained with Victoria for a further two Shield seasons but failed to register his maiden first-class hundred, although he managed a half century against a strong West Indian pace attack in a tour game.

Stillman did not play any top level cricket from February 1976 to November 1977 and when he came back it was with South Australia, who he represented in the 1977/78 Sheffield Shield season. He would later return to Victoria as coach and also coached at English club Derbyshire.
