= Michael McFarland =

Michael McFarland may refer to:

- Michael C. McFarland (born 1948), president of the College of the Holy Cross in Worcester, Massachusetts
- Mike McFarland (1970–2026), American voice actor

== See also ==
- Michael McFarlane (disambiguation)
