= Mansfield Football Club =

Australian rules football and netball club

Mansfield

Names
- Full name: Mansfield Football Netball Club
- Nickname: Eagles

Club details
- Founded: c. 1881–83 (Note: The date of establishment of the club is unclear. There are some records of a Mansfield FC game in July 1883. Nevertheless, in 1886 the Mansfield Courier reported that Mansfield had fielded teams in 1881.)
- Colours
- Competition: Goulburn Valley FL
- Premierships: 2 (2004, 2009)
- Ground: Mansfield Recreation Reserve

Uniforms
Home

Other information
- Official website: mansfieldfnc.com.au

The Mansfield Football Netball Club, nicknamed the Eagles, is an Australian rules football and netball club based in Mansfield, Victoria.

The Mansfield teams currently compete in the Goulburn Valley League. The Eagles home ground is the Mansfield Recreation Reserve.

== History ==
The seed of the Mansfield FC was planted because of an advertisement in the Mansfield Guardian on 18 May 1878. The ad called for a meeting to be held at the Mansfield Hotel with the purpose of forming a football club.

Surviving records of those times describe a game between Mansfield and Jamieson in July 1883. Nevertheless, in 1886 the Mansfield Courier reported that Mansfield had fielded teams in 1881.

Early games were played against neighbouring towns on a round robin basis with the teams playing for trophies donated by prominent businessmen. The original shirt worn by Mansfield was white with red stripes. In 1900 these local clubs formed an Association, adopted a constitution and began a formal competition for points culminating in a final series. Mansfield played many clubs in this era in various leagues and associations. Jamieson, Bonnie Doon, Merton, Maindample, Delatite, Mt Battery, Swanpool, Tolmie, Yarck, among others.

Between the wars the district became unable to maintain numerous clubs, so the various smaller ones morphed towards the larger Mansfield FC and Mount Battery FC. Eventually these two formed the "Mansfield Battery FC", adopting a navy blue guernsey with a white monogram.

Mansfield competed continuously in the various District Associations until after World War II when the club joined the Waranga North East FL. The netball section would be added later.

Trent Hotton, won the league best and fairest in 2007. The Eagles won their first GVFL premiership in 2004 since moving to the league in 1997. In 2009 the Eagles capped off a fantastic year with a win in the GVFL Grand Final over Kyabram, capturing their second GVFL flag in five years.

== Leagues ==
Since its foundation, the club has participated in the following leagues:

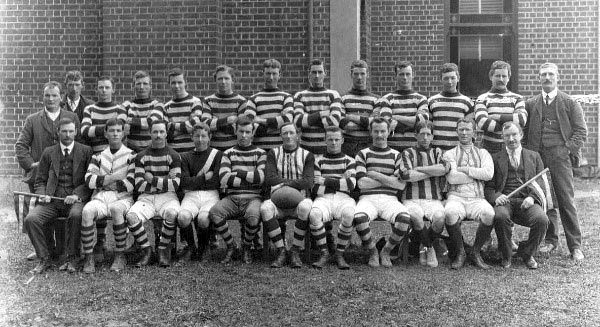
Team of Mansfield FC in 1913

- 1925–33: Mansfield Line Association
- 1934–40: Mansfield-Alexandra FA
- 1945–46: Upper Goulburn FL
- 1946–76: Waranga North East Football Association
- 1977–95: Tungamah Football League
- 1996–97: Goulburn Valley FL (2nd Division)
- 1998–present: Goulburn Valley FL

== Players ==
=== 2010 Football Squad ===
1 Matt Storer (C); 2 Mitch Wareham; 3 James Herridge; 4 Ben Millot; 5 Tim Demetriou; 6 Sam Armstrong; 7 Nick Gieschen; 8 Simon Hart; 9 Sean Purcell; 10 Fraser Stevenson; 11 Jim Hopgood; 12 Phil Doeven; 13 Warren Smith; 14 Brett Mahoney; 15 Adam Boshevski; 16 Tim Van Der Klooster; 17 Ross Brown; 18 Dom Vincent	19 Travis Leitch; 20 Brant Anselmi; 21 Simon Dick; 22 Sam Dolling; 23 Scott Heveran; 24 Casey Briggs; 25 Stuart Quinn; 26 Nathan Dundas; 27 Guy Taylor (C); 28 Kane Blunt; 29 Luke McMillian; 30 Troy Mahoney; 31 David Mensch; 32 Simon Jones; 33 Nick Gray; 34 Jarrad Mahoney; 35 James O'Grady; 36 Mark Jones	37 Sam Christopher; 38 Josh Briggs; 39 Andrew Nunn; 40 Rhys Steward; 41 Anthony Burgess; 43 Elliot Christopher; 44 Adam Mahoney; 45 Chris Laing; 46 Stephen Collins; 48 Liam Scales; 50 Lawrence Apps; 52 Tom Niewenhuizen; 54 Ben Cios; 55 Aaron Stephens; 57 Ross Hopkins; 58 Eddy Oliver; 59 Ben Ryan; 60 Alby Hill

Matt Storer and Guy Taylor are Eagles Co-Captains for the 2010 season. The Eagles Seniors are coached by ex-Collingwood player, Craig 'Ned' Kelly.

== VFL / AFL Players ==
The following footballers played with Mansfield prior to playing senior VFL / AFL football. The year indicates their VFL / AFL debut.

- 1922 - Jim Fraser - Carlton
- 1950 - Bill Reardon - Footscray
- 1953 - Tom Tarrant - Collingwood
- 1955 - Alan Jewell - Hawthorn
- 1955 - Ray Yeoman - Hawthorn
- 1957 - Peter Barran - Geelong
- 1962 - Peter Dolling - South Melbourne
- 1962 - Bob Lockhart - Richmond
- 2000 - Josh Fraser - Collingwood & Gold Coast
- 2005 - Jarrod Kayler-Thomson - Hawthorn
- 2017 - James Cousins - Hawthorn

The following players/coaches came to Mansfield, with prior VFL / AFL senior football experience -

- 1942 - Ted Leehane - Essendon
- 1982 - Peter Tossol - Melbourne
- 1989 - Craig Kelly - ex-Collingwood and player manager.
- 1990 - Brendan Hehir - Draft Number 17, in AFL 1990 National Draft. Geelong, Australian Football League
- 1993 - Andrew Tranquilli - ex-Collingwood player in the Australian Football League
- 1992 - David Mensch - ex-Geelong player in the Australian Football League
- 1994 - Trent Hotton - ex-Carlton player in the Australian Football League
- 1997 - Darren Hulme - Carlton
- 1999 - David A. Clarke - Geelong & Carlton
- 2005 - Craig Flint - Number 17 in 2005 AFL Rookie Draft. Carlton

== Premierships ==
- Mansfield Hotel / Bremner's Cup (1):
  - 1900
- Mansfield FA (3):
  - 1900, 1904, 1905
- Mansfield District FA (3):
  - 1911, 1912, 1913
- Mansfield Swanpool District FA (1):
  - 1927
- Mansfield Line FA (1):
  - 1929
- Waranga North East Football Association (4):
  - 1951, 1953, 1954, 1955
- Tungamah Football League (2):
  - 1987, 1989
- Goulburn Valley 2nd. Division (1):
  - 1996
- Goulburn Valley FL (2):
  - 2004, 2009

== Grand Finals ==
2004 GVFL Grand Final	Goals	Behinds	Total
Tatura	11	8	74
Mansfield	20	15	135
Venue: Deakin Reserve, Shepparton

2009 GVFL Grand Final	Goals	Behinds	Total
Mansfield	16	12	108
Kyabram	13	9	87
Venue: Deakin Reserve, Shepparton

== Football League Best & Fairest honors ==
Seniors

- Tungamah Football League
  - 1987 - Bruce McCormack
  - 1988 - Bruce McCormack
- Goulburn Valley Football League - Division 2
  - 1997 - Dennis Sheahan
- Goulburn Valley Football League
  - 2007 - Trent Hotton

Reserves

- Waranga North East Football Association
  - 1954 - K Doolan
  - 1966 - Bill Reardon Reardon also won this award in 1961, 1962 and 1963, playing with Bonnie Doon FC.
