= Tom Tarrant =

Australian rules footballer

Personal information
- Full name: Thomas Lewis Tarrant
- Born: 29 September 1931
- Died: 23 August 2017 (aged 85); Gold Coast, Queensland
- Original team: Mansfield
- Height: 180 cm (5 ft 11 in)
- Weight: 78 kg (172 lb)

Playing career^{1}
Years	Club	Games (Goals)
1953–54	Collingwood	7 (1)
- ^{1} Playing statistics correct to the end of 1954.

Tom Tarrant (29 September 1931 – 23 August 2017) was an Australian rules footballer who played for the Collingwood Football Club in the Victorian Football League (VFL).
