= Peter Dolling =

Australian rules footballer

Personal information
- Full name: Peter Dolling
- Born: 20 February 1941 (age 85)
- Original team: Mansfield
- Height: 177 cm (5 ft 10 in)
- Weight: 78 kg (172 lb)

Playing career^{1}
| Years | Club | Games (Goals) |
| 1962–63 | South Melbourne | 23 (9) |
- ^{1} Playing statistics correct to the end of 1963.

Peter Dolling (born 20 February 1941) is a former Australian rules footballer who played with South Melbourne in the Victorian Football League (VFL).
