= Bill Shelton (footballer, born 1902) =

Australian rules footballer (1902–1995)

Personal information
- Full name: William Shelton
- Born: 3 August 1902
- Died: 11 May 1995 (aged 92)
- Original team: Brighton
- Height: 182 cm (6 ft 0 in)
- Weight: 83 kg (183 lb)
- Position: Follower

Playing career^{1}
Years	Club	Games (Goals)
1919–1925	Melbourne	54 (17)
- ^{1} Playing statistics correct to the end of 1925.

Bill Shelton (3 August 1902 – 11 May 1995) was an Australian rules footballer who played with Melbourne in the Victorian Football League (VFL). He was the cousin of Jack Shelton.
