= Euroa Memorial Oval =

Sports venue in Euroa, Victoria

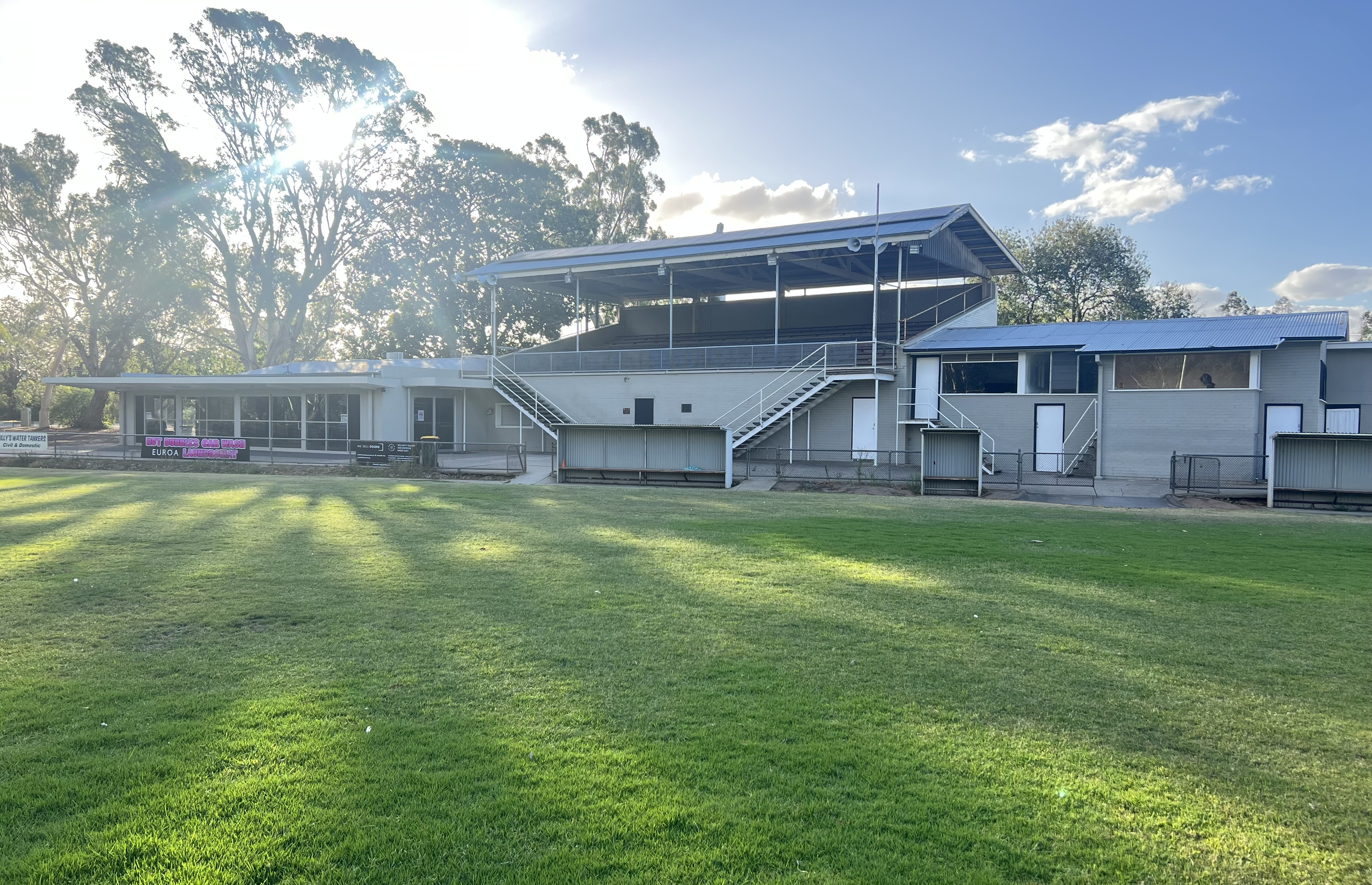
- Euroa Memorial Oval in February 2026
- Interactive map of Euroa Memorial Oval
- Address: Dunn St; Euroa, Victoria
- Coordinates: 36.74615550697721°S 145.57496793105403°E
- Operator: Euroa Oval Committee
- Record attendance: 7,500 (Carlton vs Hawthorn, 14 June 1952)

Construction
- Opened: 1884; 142 years ago
- Cost: A$400,000 (redevelopment)

Tenants
- Euroa Football Club (GVL); Euroa Cricket Club (Cricket Shepparton)

Website
- euroamemorialoval.com.au

Memorial Oval (also known as Euroa Memorial Oval) is an Australian rules football and cricket venue located in the Victorian town of Euroa. It also serves as a multi-purpose function centre.

As of 2026, it is the home of the Euroa Football Club in the Goulburn Valley League (GVL) and the Euroa Cricket Club in the Cricket Shepparton competition.

== History ==
In 1884, the forest was cleared to make way for the construction of the ground (originally known as Euroa Cricket Ground or Euroa Oval). A plaque was planted near the main gates to commemorate the coronation of King George V in 1911.

During the 1952 season, Euroa Oval hosted a Victorian Football League (VFL) match between Carlton and Hawthorn as part of an effort from the Australian National Football Council to promote the VFL across Australia. Carlton won the match by 37 points in front of a crowd of 7,500 people.

Redevelopment works began in 2013 to improve the ground's lighting and amenities, along with the conversion of the George Hunter Room into a multi-purpose conference and function centre.
