= Ray Ross (footballer, born 1903) =

Australian rules footballer

Personal information
- Full name: Raymond Roberts Ross
- Born: 20 April 1903; Broadford, Victoria
- Died: 23 June 1981 (aged 78); Broadford, Victoria
- Original team: Broadford
- Height: 173 cm (5 ft 8 in)
- Weight: 71 kg (157 lb)

Playing career^{1}
Years	Club	Games (Goals)
1922	Richmond	1 (1)
1929	St Kilda	1 (0)
Total		2 (1)
- ^{1} Playing statistics correct to the end of 1929.

Raymond Roberts Ross (20 April 1903 – 23 June 1981) was an Australian rules footballer who played with Richmond and St Kilda in the Victorian Football League (VFL).

== Death ==
He died (suddenly) at Broadford, Victoria on 23 June 1981.
