= Bill Tebble =

Australian rules footballer

Personal information
- Full name: William John Tebble
- Born: 17 June 1928; Avenel, Victoria
- Died: 9 August 2004 (aged 76)
- Original team: Preston Boys' Club
- Height: 182 cm (6 ft 0 in)
- Weight: 86 kg (190 lb)

Playing career^{1}
| Years | Club | Games (Goals) |
| 1950–53 | Collingwood | 57 (8) |
- ^{1} Playing statistics correct to the end of 1953.

William John Tebble (17 June 1928 – 9 August 2004) was an Australian rules footballer who played with Collingwood in the Victorian Football League (VFL).

== Family ==
The son of ex-South Melbourne footballer, Patrick Travers Tebble (1903–1968), and Hilda Victoria May Tebble (1908–1987), née Lewis, William John Tebble was born in Avenel, Victoria on 17 June 1928.

== Football ==
He played in 57 First XVIII matches with Collingwood over four seasons.

He went to Mortlake as coach in 1954.
