= Joe Hammond =

Australian rules footballer (1902–1990)

Personal information
- Full name: Joseph William Hammond
- Born: 10 July 1902; Broadford, Victoria
- Died: 25 December 1990 (aged 88)
- Original team: Broadford
- Height: 180 cm (5 ft 11 in)
- Weight: 83 kg (183 lb)

Playing career^{1}
Years	Club	Games (Goals)
1925–1932	Essendon	122 (18)
- ^{1} Playing statistics correct to the end of 1932.

Joseph William Hammond (10 July 1902 – 25 December 1990) was an Australian rules footballer who played with Essendon in the Victorian Football League (VFL).

== Family ==
His brother, Bob Hammond, also played VFL football, representing both Hawthorn and St Kilda.

== Football ==
Hammond, a Broadford recruit, was a defender and ruckman.

When he started at Essendon in 1925, the club were coming off back to back premierships, but from round six he was a regular fixture in the team.

Hammond represented Victoria at the 1927 Melbourne Carnival.

He was the club's vice-captain from 1930 to 1932. His career ended in 1932, when he badly injured his groin.
