= Frank Martin (Australian footballer) =

Australian rules footballer

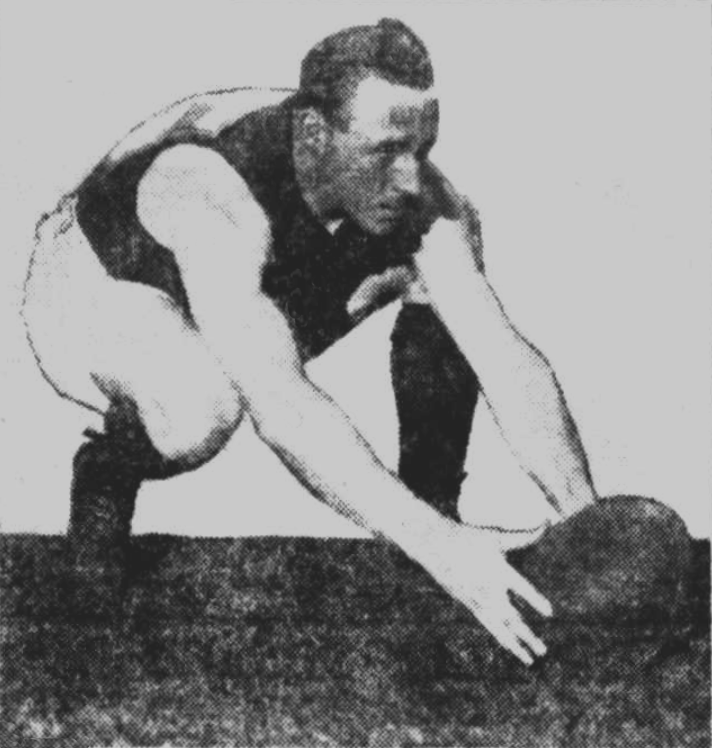

Personal information
- Full name: Francis Maurice Martin
- Born: 30 June 1895; Avenel, Victoria
- Died: 23 February 1969 (aged 73); Rosebud, Victoria
- Original team: Avenel
- Height: 174 cm (5 ft 9 in)
- Weight: 82 kg (181 lb)

Playing career^{1}
Years	Club	Games (Goals)
1917–23	Carlton	87 (15)
- ^{1} Playing statistics correct to the end of 1923.

Francis Maurice Martin (30 June 1895 – 23 February 1969) was an Australian rules footballer who played with Carlton in the Victorian Football League (VFL).
