= Pat Tebble =

Australian rules footballer

Personal information
- Full name: Patrick Travers Tebble
- Born: 9 November 1903; Avenel, Victoria
- Died: 9 June 1968 (aged 64); Fitzroy, Victoria
- Original team: Avenel

Playing career^{1}
Years	Club	Games (Goals)
1928	South Melbourne	3 (0)
- ^{1} Playing statistics correct to the end of 1928.

Patrick Travers Tebble (9 November 1903 – 9 June 1968) was an Australian rules footballer who played with South Melbourne in the Victorian Football League (VFL).

== Family ==
The son of William Tebble (1854-1926), and Maria Tebble (1859-1945), née Travers, Patrick Travers Tebble was born at Avenel, Victoria on 9 November 1903.

He married Hilda Victoria May Lewis (1908-1987) in 1928. His son, William John Tebble (1928–2004), played for Collingwood.

== Football ==
Recruited from Avenel Football Club in 1928, he played in three senior games for South Melbourne in 1928.
