= Don Gross (footballer) =

Australian rules footballer

Personal information
- Full name: Donald Rupert Gross
- Born: 1 April 1947 (age 79)
- Original team: Euroa
- Height: 173 cm (5 ft 8 in)
- Weight: 75 kg (165 lb)

Playing career^{1}
Years	Club	Games (Goals)
1965–1974	Essendon	121 (105)
- ^{1} Playing statistics correct to the end of 1974.

Donald Gross (born 1 April 1947) is a former Australian rules footballer who played with Essendon in the Victorian Football League (VFL).

Gross was a left footer, playing mostly as a rover and on the wings. He came from Euroa in north-east Victoria and had only just turned 18 when he made his debut in the opening round of the 1965 VFL season. His 16 games that year included a preliminary final victory over Collingwood, but a broken collarbone sustained in the win ruled him out of the grand final.

Having missed out on selection in Essendon's 1965 premiership team, Gross got his chance three years later when he was named on the bench for the 1968 VFL Grand Final, but they would lose to Carlton by just three points.

He played 19 games in 1971 and kicked 22 goals, both of which were career bests. His efforts during the season were recognised in the W. S. Crichton Medal count, with Gross finishing in third position.

His only VFL appearance in 1974 was his 121st and final game for Essendon but he was prominent in the reserves that season as captain-coach. He also coached the Essendon Under-19s side, from 1977 to 1980.
