= Kevin Parks (Australian footballer) =

Australian rules footballer (born 1935)

Personal information
- Full name: Kevin Robert Parks
- Born: 9 July 1935 (age 91)
- Original teams: Kilmore, Broadford
- Height: 184 cm (6 ft 0 in)
- Weight: 76 kg (168 lb)

Playing career^{1}
Years	Club	Games (Goals)
1958–1959	Essendon	10 (0)
- ^{1} Playing statistics correct to the end of 1959.

Kevin Robert Parks (born 9 July 1935) is a former Australian rules footballer who played with Essendon in the Victorian Football League (VFL).

Parks started out at Kilmore but was playing with Broadford, where he was runner up in the 1956 Waranga North East Football Association best and fairest award when recruited by Essendon.

A half back, Parks played six games for Essendon Reserves in 1956 and also won Broadford's best and fairest award.

He played eight games for Essendon in the 1958 VFL season and appeared twice the following year.

He played for Kyneton from 1960 to 1966 and captain-coached a premiership team in the last of those years. In 1960 he won the Bendigo Football League's best and fairest award.
