= Eon Densworth =

Australian rules footballer

Personal information
- Full name: Eon Joseph Densworth
- Born: 28 January 1938
- Original team: Broadford
- Height: 175 cm (5 ft 9 in)
- Weight: 78 kg (172 lb)

Playing career^{1}
Years	Club	Games (Goals)
1959	Footscray	3 (0)
- ^{1} Playing statistics correct to the end of 1959.

Eon Joseph Densworth (born 28 January 1938) is a former Australian rules footballer who played with Footscray in the Victorian Football League (VFL).
