= Alan White (Australian footballer) =

Australian rules footballer

Personal information
- Full name: Allan Graham White
- Born: 21 November 1933; Carlton, Victoria, Australia
- Died: 27 June 2018 (aged 84); Shepparton, Victoria, Australia
- Original team: Avenel
- Height: 180 cm (5 ft 11 in)
- Weight: 73 kg (161 lb)
- Position: Forward

Playing career^{1}
| Years | Club | Games (Goals) |
| 1957–1959 | Carlton | 23 (23) |
- ^{1} Playing statistics correct to the end of 1959.

Allan Graham White (21 November 1933 – 27 June 2018) was an Australian rules footballer who played for the Carlton Football Club in the Victorian Football League (VFL) who was recruited from Avenel after leading the 1957 goalkicking in the Waranga & North East Football Association with 74 goals.

He later played for and coached Mildura Imperials in the Sunraysia Football League.
