= Bill Shelton (footballer, born 1936) =

Australian rules footballer

Personal information
- Full name: William G. Shelton
- Born: 13 July 1936 (age 90); Avenel, Victoria
- Original team: Croydon
- Height: 183 cm (6 ft 0 in)
- Weight: 77 kg (170 lb)

Playing career^{1}
Years	Club	Games (Goals)
1957–1959	Hawthorn	12 (5)
- ^{1} Playing statistics correct to the end of 1959.

William Shelton (born 13 July 1936) is a former Australian rules footballer who played with Hawthorn in the Victorian Football League (VFL).

Shelton played only 12 senior games for Hawthorn, in three seasons, but performed well enough in the reserves to win a Gardiner Medal in 1959.

He had been just five years of age when his father, Jack, died at Tobruk in World War II. Jack Shelton had played league football for St Kilda and South Melbourne. Bill's cousin Ian was also a VFL footballer. Their grandfather, Richard, father of Jack, was famously saved from drowning in the swollen Hughes creek at Avenel by Ned Kelly.

He is a founding partner of Allard Shelton Pty Ltd, leading Commercial Real Estate agents. He was a Director and Vice President of the RACV for 24 years. He was also a prime lamb producer on his farming property in Avenel.
