= Tebbe =

Tebbe is a surname. Notable people with the surname include:

- Frederick N. Tebbe (1935–1995), American chemist
- Friedrich-Wilhelm Tebbe (born 1945) German conductor, singer and organist
- Mark Tebbe (born 1961), Adjunct Professor of Entrepreneurship at the University of Chicago's Booth School of Business

See also

- Tebbe's reagent, is the organometallic compound
