= George Clark (Australian footballer) =

Australian rules footballer

Personal information
- Full name: George Leslie Clark
- Born: 2 September 1898; Broadford, Victoria
- Died: 24 October 1978 (aged 80); Kilmore, Victoria
- Original team: Broadford

Playing career^{1}
Years	Club	Games (Goals)
1922	Richmond	1 (0)
- ^{1} Playing statistics correct to the end of 1922.

George Leslie Clark (2 September 1898 – 24 October 1978) was a former Australian rules footballer who played with Richmond in the Victorian Football League (VFL).
