= Jack Shelton (footballer, born 1905) =

Australian rules footballer (1905–1941)

Personal information
- Full name: John Thomas Shelton
- Born: 24 January 1905; Avenel, Victoria
- Died: 1 May 1941 (aged 36); Tobruk, Libya
- Original team: Avenel
- Height: 180 cm (5 ft 11 in)
- Weight: 80 kg (176 lb)

Playing career^{1}
Years	Club	Games (Goals)
1926, 1928–29	St Kilda	28 (4)
1930	South Melbourne	7 (2)
Total		35 (6)
- ^{1} Playing statistics correct to the end of 1930.

John Thomas Shelton (24 January 1905 – 1 May 1941) is a former Australian rules footballer who played with St Kilda and South Melbourne. He was killed in action in Tobruk in 1941.

== "Jack A. Shelton" ==
As a VFL footballer, he was sometimes known as "J. A. Shelton" (rather than "J. T. Shelton" ), with the "A" most likely a reference to Avenel, in order to distinguish him from the other "Jack Shelton", one John Frederick "Jack" Shelton, (Note: Both Main & Allen, (2002, p. 336) and Feldman & Holmesby (1992), have confused this Jack Shelton (John Thomas "Jack" Shelton) and the other St Kilda Jack Shelton (John Frederick "Jack" Shelton). This Jack Shelton was not in the St Kilda team that played against Geelong at the Corio Oval on 7 August 1926. However, John Frederick "Jack" Shelton did play for St Kilda on that day (see the VFL list of Geelong and St Kilda players participating in the 7 August 1926 match at ). Consequently, the "Shelton" mentioned in the account of the thuggery directed, particularly, at Geelong's Arthur Rayson (who also worked as the caretaker at the Corio Oval), by members of the St Kilda team, and the account of the spectators' response to Rayson's injury (which included broken ribs), specifically directed at "Shelton", refers exclusively to John Frederick "Jack" Shelton, and not "this" Shelton (as Main & Allen and Feldman & Holmesby mistakenly state): see Football Sensations: Disgraceful Scenes: Police Intervention at Geelong, The Argus, (Monday, 9 August 1926), p.11; Football: Topical and Personal: Melee at a Melbourne Match, The (Adelaide) Advertiser, (Friday, 13 August 1926), p.25; Brawl at Geelong: Players and Spectators Fight: Picket Used in Melee, The Age, (Monday, 9 August 1926), p.7; A Spiteful Game, The Argus, (Monday, 9 August 1926), p.16; and St Kilda Outplayed, The Age, (Monday, 9 August 1926), p.7. In fact, although a very tough and relentless footballer, this Jack Shelton, unlike his teammate John Frederick "Jack" Shelton, was never reported, let alone suspended, in his entire football career.) a prolific goalkicker, who had been recruited from Koo Wee Rup in 1926 (and was playing for St Kilda at the same time).

== Family ==
The son of Richard John and Jane Elizabeth Shelton (née Skinner), he was born at Avenel, Victoria, on 24 January 1905. As a young lad of 7, Jack's father had been saved from drowning in swollen Hughes Creek, Avanel, by a young Ned Kelly, aged 10.

Jack married Winifred "Freda" Emma Planck Gadd (1905–1988) on 26 March 1932. The cousin of Melbourne footballer Bill Shelton, he was the father of John Shelton (born 13 August 1933), and Hawthorn's Bill Shelton (born 13 July 1936), and the uncle of Essendon's Ian "Bluey" Shelton.

== Education ==
He was educated at Brighton Grammar School as a boarder, and he later attended Dookie Agricultural College.

== Footballer ==
Although he began as a forward and rover, throughout his later senior football career he played as an either a backman or in the ruck. He was a tough player who played hard and fair.

=== St Kilda ===
He received his clearance to play for St Kilda on 28 April 1926. He played eleven senior games for St Kilda in his first season, playing his first game, on the half-forward flank, against Hawthorn at the Junction Oval on 5 June 1926.

He returned to Avenel for the 1927 season; and, rejoined play with St Kilda in mid-1928, resuming his senior career in the eighth round match against Essendon, in the first ruck, at Windy Hill, on 4 June 1928. Shelton played very well in his first game back in the VFL, and St Kilda won by 9 points. He played eleven senior matches for St Kilda in 1928 (rounds 8 to 18 inclusive) and six in 1929, with his last match against Richmond, at the Punt Road Oval on 13 July 1929 (round eleven).

=== South Melbourne ===
He received his clearance to play for South Melbourne on 11 June 1930. He played his first match for South Melbourne, as a back-pocket ruckman, against Hawthorn on 14 June 1930 (round seven). South Melbourne thrashed Hawthorn 17.11 (119) to 9.10 (64), in its first win for the 1930 season.

He played the next two matches (rounds eight and nine), and the last four matches of the season, retiring after playing against North Melbourne at the Lake Oval on 13 September 1930. He was one of the best players in a team that soundly beat North Melbourne 15.19 (109) to 4.14 (38), having kicked 9.6 (60) to 1.1 (7) in the last quarter.

=== Avenel ===
He received his clearance to play for Avenel on 3 June 1931. In 1934, in a match against Nagambie, he broke a collarbone.

At the time of his enlistment in the second AIF, in mid-1940, he was still playing football for Avenel, and was the captain of the Avenel team.

Lieutenant John Thomas Shelton (VX47976)

At 6 a.m. our carriers moved forward towards "B" Company,
although was not yet light. By 7 a.m. the mist was lifting, and
Lieutenant John Shelton volunteered to go forward to "A"
Company. The mist lifted and observers at B.H.Q. saw his
carrier drive down the Acroma road past "B" road past "B"
Company. The mist rolled down again, cutting out any obser-
vation until twenty minutes later, when a carrier was observed
burning on the Acroma Road. Sergeant John Catherall took
his carrier forward at the same time towards "C" Company,
but came under fire from enemy tanks which had come
through the wire in "A" Company's area and had knocked
out Shelton's carrier. Shelton, who was driving, was killed,
but his foot jammed on the accelerator and his crew were
able to turn the vehicle back; but they were then hit again
and the petrol tank blew up. Sergeant Catherall was able to
pick up the two surviving crew members. John Shelton had
proved himself a courageous soldier and was the first of our
officers to be killed in action.

== Soldier ==
Both his eldest brother, Private Richard John Shelton (1895–1967), and his second-oldest brother, Sergeant Leslie Norman Shelton (1897–1933), had served in the First AIF (they both enlisted on 19 September 1914, with Leslie producing letters of permission from his mother and father).

On 23 July 1940, Jack left his farm, "Mittagong", at Avenel and enlisted in the Second AIF aged 35.

After training at Wangaratta, he was promoted to Lieutenant, joined the 2/24th Battalion, (Note: "The 2/24th Infantry Battalion was raised at Wangaratta, Victoria, in July 1940. Initially part of 7th Division, the 2/24th would become famous as part of the 9th Division, particularly for actions during the Siege of Tobruk and the Second Battle of El Alamein. Service in North Africa would be followed by action against the Japanese in the Pacific, notably at Tarakan and Wareo" (Shrine of Remembrance (Melbourne): 2/24 Australian Infantry Battalion Association).) and was sent to the Middle East, and then Northern Africa, with the 9th Division.

He was killed in action, at Tobruk, on 1 May 1941.

== Remembered ==
His name appears on the Roll of Honour (panel 52) at the Australian War memorial. He has no known grave, and is commemorated at the Alamein Memorial, in Egypt.

== Honours and awards ==
- 1939–1945 Star
- Africa Star
- War Medal 1939–1945
- Australia Service Medal 1939–1945

== See also ==
- List of Victorian Football League players who died on active service
- Siege of Tobruk
- The Rats of Tobruk
