= Wally Nash =

Australian rules footballer (1929–2024)

Personal information
- Full name: Walter Edward Nash
- Born: 10 June 1929
- Died: 20 June 2024 (aged 95); Altona, Victoria
- Original teams: Warragul, Balaclava
- Height: 178 cm (5 ft 10 in)
- Weight: 75 kg (165 lb)

Playing career^{1}
| Years | Club | Games (Goals) |
| 1953–54 | Hawthorn | 17 (18) |
- ^{1} Playing statistics correct to the end of 1954.

Career highlights
- 1949, 1950 leading goalkicker CGFL. 1951, 1952 leading goalkicker WNEFL

Walter Edward Nash (10 June 1929 – 20 June 2024) was an Australian rules footballer who played with Hawthorn in the Victorian Football League (VFL).

Nash began his career as a fifteen year old making his debut with Warragul in the Central Gippsland FL in 1945. He showed great promise as a small forward.

As he matured and grew bigger, Nash was moved to full forward and in 1949 won the CGFL goalkicking with 80 goals. He backed up that effort in 1950 with 89 goals for the season.

In 1951 Nash transferred to Euroa, he topped the goalkicking for the Waranga North East FL both years he played. He kicked 74 and 88 goals respectively. Hawthorn signed him in 1953 where he stayed for three years and played 17 games for 18 goals. A knee injury in early 1955 stopped him from playing.
