= Jack Sambell =

Australian rules footballer (1908–1982)

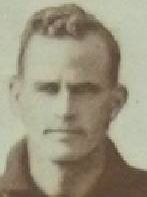

Personal information
- Full name: Jack Reginald Sambell
- Born: 20 May 1908; Violet Town, Victoria
- Died: 22 August 1982 (aged 74); Fitzroy, Victoria
- Original teams: Euroa, Glen Iris, Yallourn

Playing career^{1}
Years	Club	Games (Goals)
1933–34	Melbourne	24 (6)
- ^{1} Playing statistics correct to the end of 1934.

Jack Reginald Sambell (20 May 1908 – 22 August 1982) was an Australian rules footballer who played with Melbourne in the Victorian Football League (VFL).

== Family ==
The second son of Edgar Shadforth Tremayne Sambell (1880–1950), and Barbara Katherine Sambell (1879–1963), née McPhee, Jack Reginald Sambell was born at Violet Town, Victoria, on 20 May 1908.

He married Vera May Howard (1907–1941) in 1935; she died giving birth to a stillborn child on 22 January 1941.

He married Mary Irene Healy (1905–2000) in 1942.

== Football ==
Transferred from Glen Iris, in the Eastern Suburbs League, in May 1932, he played in Yallourn's 1932 Gippsland Football League premiership, and won their club best and fairest award, before he was transferred to Melbourne by the Education Department in early 1933.

== Death ==
He died at Fitzroy, Victoria on 22 August 1982.
