= Mick McFarlane (footballer) =

Australian rules footballer

Personal information
- Full name: Michael Francis McFarlane
- Born: 25 October 1908; Yarrawonga, Victoria
- Died: 12 October 1981 (aged 72); Melbourne, Victoria
- Original team: Coburg / Euroa
- Height: 182 cm (6 ft 0 in)
- Weight: 73 kg (161 lb)

Playing career^{1}
Years	Club	Games (Goals)
1935–36	Coburg (VFA)	25 (2)
1936–37	Essendon	11 (15)
1937–40	North Melbourne	43 (4)
- ^{1} Playing statistics correct to the end of 1940.

Michael Francis McFarlane (25 October 1908 – 12 October 1981) was an Australian rules footballer who played with Essendon and North Melbourne in the Victorian Football League (VFL).
