= Seymour Football Club =

Seymour

Names
- Full name: Seymour Football Netball Club
- Nickname(s): Lions

Club details
- Founded: 1880; 145 years ago
- Colours
- Competition: Goulburn Valley Football League
- Premierships: 7 (1976, 1981, 1982, 1991, 2005, 2006, 2007)
- Ground(s): Kings Park

Uniforms
Home

The Seymour Football Netball Club, nicknamed the Lions, is an Australian rules football and netball club based in the historic railway township of Seymour, Victoria.

== History ==
Seymour first competed in the North East Football Association (NEFA) in 1891, then played in four consecutive grand finals, winning two in 1899 and 1902, then again in 1904, 1910 and 1912.

In 1913 with only Avenel, Euroa and Seymour teams left in the NEFA, a meeting was held and the Waranga North East Football Association was formed on - Tuesday, 13 May 1913 from the following teams: Avenel, Euroa, Murchieson, Nagambie, Rushworth and Seymour.

Seymour FC teams have competed in the Goulburn Valley League continuously since 1976. Seymour won the GVFL premiership three consecutive seasons from 2005 to 2007 and finished runners up in 2008.

== Senior Football Premierships ==
- North East Football Association
  - 1899, 1902, 1904, 1910, 1912.
- Waranga North East Football Association
  - 1919, 1920, 1923 - (undefeated), 1928, 1934, 1935, 1947, 1948, 1959, 1966, 1975
- Goulburn Valley Football League
  - 1976, 1981, 1982, 1991, 2005, 2006, 2007

== Senior Football - Runners Up ==
- North East Football Association
  - 1895, 1900, 1901, 1903, 1911
- Waranga North East Football Association
  - 1922, 1924, 1925, 1926, 1927, 1950, 1954, 1956, 1960, 1964, 1967, 1968, 1969, 1970, 1971, 1972, 1973, 1974.
- Goulburn Valley Football League
  - 2008, 2012

== Reserves Football - Premierships ==
- Waranga North East Football Association
  - 1952, 1953, 1954, 1967, 1969, 1973, 1974.
- Goulburn Valley Football League
  - 1983, 1986, 2006, 2008, 2019

== Reserves Football - Runners Up ==
- Waranga North East Football Association
  - 1961, 1962, 1965, 1966, 1968,
- Goulburn Valley Football League
  - 2004, 2023

== Thirds / Under 18's Football - Premierships ==
- Goulburn Valley Football League
  - 2007

== Thirds / Under 18's Football - Runner Up ==
- Waranga North East Football Association
  - ?

== League Best and Fairest Winners ==
Seniors

- Waranga North East Football Association
  - 1954 - Alf Harrison
- Goulburn Valley Football League - Morrison Medal
  - 1940 - Cecil Froelich
  - 1978 - Greg Liddell
  - 1989 - Jonathan Solomon
  - 2004 - Shane Schottner
  - 2021 & 2023 - Jack O'Sullivan
  - 2022 - Ben Rigoni

Reserves

- Hume Highway Football League
  - 1940 - Len Patford
- Waranga North East Football Association
  - 1958 - Vin Hall
  - 1965 - J Brock
- Goulburn Valley Football League - Abikhair Medal
  - 1982 - K Roberts
  - 1991 - Greg Liddell
  - 1992 - Andrew Elliott
  - 2006 - John Rudd

Thirds

- Goulburn Valley Football League - Pattison Medal
  - 1987 - Michael Gardiner
  - 1996 - John Rudd
  - 2008 - Jason Cole
  - 2022 - Angus Murray

== League Goalkicking Awards ==
Seniors

- Goulburn Valley Football League
  - 1978 - Ray Stomann - 91
  - 1983 - Darren Comi - 86
  - 2007 - Saad Saad - 96
  - 2009 - Saad Saad - 89
  - 2012 - Saad Saad - 104 (117)
  - 2013 - Saad Saad - 102
