= Dookie United Football Club =

Australian rules football and netball club

Dookie United

Names
- Full name: Dookie United Football Netball Club
- Motto: ?

2020 season

Club details
- Founded: 1 January 1887; 139 years ago
- Colours: Black White; Teal Silver
- Competition: Kyabram & District Football League
- Chairperson: Steve Ludeman
- Coach: Dale Osbourne
- Ground: Dookie Recreation Reserve

Uniforms
Home

The Dookie United Football Netball Club, known as the "Dooks", is an Australian rules football and netball club playing in the Kyabram District Football Netball League. Dookie United is based in the small Victorian town of Dookie.

The club changed leagues in 2018, following an administration disagreement between the AFL Goulburn-Valley and the Picola & District Football League.

== History ==
=== Dookie Football Club – 1887 to 1976 ===
The original Dookie Football Club was established in 1887.

In one of Dookie's earliest recorded matches in 1891, Dookie: 6.20 – 56 defeated Katamatite: 0.0 – 0 at Dookie.

In July 1903, The Dookie FC was reformed with office bearers and a committee elected. The club colours selected were – navy blue and white, with a red sash, with blue and white socks.

In 1906, the Dookie Football Association was formed, with Dookie finishing on top of the ladder and winning the premiership.

In 1912, Dookie FC won two premierships, defeating Caniambo in the Dookie FA and in the Katandra Wednesday FA, defeating Katandra. In 1912 and 1913 there was a Dookie Wednesday Football Club, that use to play on the Wednesday afternoon half holiday.

In June 1914, after six months of negotiating for the purchase of some land suitable for a recreation reserve close to Dookie, the newly established Dookie Recreation Reserve was officially opened, when Dookie hosted Devenish in a football association match.

in 1915, Dookie FC wore the red and black colours.

In 1915, the Katandra Football Association went into recess due to the large number of young local men who enlisted in the armed forces in World War I.

In 1915, an under 18 Dookie Boys Football Club was formed for young lads to play football against Cosgrove, Pine Lodge and Yabba North State Schools. In 1919, the Dookie Line Football Association was formed from the following clubs – Benalla, Devenish, Dookie and St. James.

In 1932, Dookie FC played in the Katandra District Football Association. In 1946, Dookie Firsts and Seconds played in the Central Goulburn Valley Football League. In 1947, Dookie changed from a purple jumper to a black and white stripes jumper and were coached by L Hears.

Dookie FC competed in the Benalla Tungamah Football League from 1949 to 1966, then moved across to the Tungamah Football League in 1967 until 1976.

=== Dookie Agricultural College Football Club – 1893 to 1976 ===
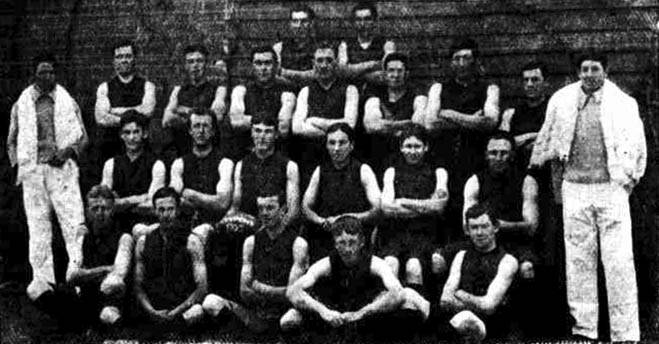
Team of Dookie Agricultural College, 1905 champions

In 1908, Dookie College FC initially entered the Dookie FA, but later withdrew.

Dookie College FC played in the Shepparton District Second Eighteen Football Association (SDSEFA) in 1927 and 1928. In 1927, E Wuttrich (Dookie United FC) shared the best junior player award in the SDSEFA. In 1929, the Control of Agricultural Education barred the Dookie College FC from re-joining the SDSEFA, as a student was injured in 1928 and was incapacitated for the year. Dookie College returned to the SDSEFA competition in 1930.

G Walker, won the club's best & fairest award in 1935.

In 1939 and 1940, Dookie College played in the Tatong Thoona Football League.

From 1946 to 1952, Dookie College played the Central Goulburn Valley Football League, with their "Seconds" side winning the 1948 Benalla & District Football League premiership.

In 1947, Dookie College had firsts and seconds in the Central Goulburn FL, with their thirds team playing in the Benalla and District FL.

Former 1954 world one mile record holder and running champion, John Landy, played football with Dookie College Football Club in 1949 and 1950, winning the Central Goulburn Valley Football League – best and fairest award in 1950 and was a potential VFL footballer, before his running took centre stage.

Dookie College FC first competed in the Benalla Tungamah Football League in 1953 until 1966, then moved across to the Tungamah Football League in 1967 until 1976.

=== Dookie – Cosgrove Football Club – 1930 ===
Dookie & Cosgrove merged in 1930 and entered a team in the Shepparton District Second Eighteen Football Association (SDSEFA) as the Dookie – Cosgrove FC. Both Dookie FC & Cosgrove FC returned to the Katandra FA in 1931 as separate clubs.

=== Dookie – Yabba Football Club – 1932 to 1940 ===
In 1932, a Yabba – Dookie Football Club was established for a "Seconds" team to compete in the Devenish – Mulwala Football Association, in which they defeated St. James in the final.

In 1933 this merged team entered the Benalla Mulwala Football League and defeated Wilby in the grand final. In 1940, they played in the Goulburn Valley Football Association.

=== Dookie United Football Club – 1977 to present day ===
Dookie United FNC was founded in 1977 from a merger of the "Dookie Football Club" and the "Dookie Agricultural College Football Club".

Both original clubs were having difficulty fielding two senior teams. In its first year Dookie United played off in the senior and reserves footy grand finals. Since 1977, Dookie have been regularly been involved in finals footy.

Since the merger, the club has successfully been able to work together as a local community to welcome and make part of the club, the new influx of students each year who attend the University of Melbourne based at the Dookie College campus.

Former Dookie United junior Luke Lowden was drafted to the Hawthorn Football Club at the 2008 AFL draft.

== Football competitions timelines ==
Dookie Football Club

- 1887 to 1905: No evidence of any formal competitions, (except for 1893) but played many friendly matches against other local towns / clubs.
- 1893 – Cahill Cup
- 1906 to 1913: Dookie Football Association
- 1912 & 1913: Katandra Football Association (Dookie Wednesday FC)
- 1914: Devenish Dookie Football Association
- 1915 to 1918: Senior football team in recess, due to World War I
- 1919: Dookie Line Football Association
- 1920 & 1921: Benalla Yarrawonga Line Football Association. Teams – Benalla, Devenish, Dookie, Mulwala, St. James, Tungamah, Yarrawonga.
- 1922 to 1925: Dookie Football Association. Teams – Cosgrove, Dookie, Katandra, Stewarton, Wattville & Yabba.
- 1926: Goulburn Valley Second Eighteens Football Association
- 1927: Dookie Football Association. Five teams – Dookie, Drumanure, Katamatite, Katandra, and Yabba.
- 1928 & 1929: Katandra Football Association. Six teams – Dookie, Drumanure, Katamatite, Katandra, Numurkah Imperials and Yabba.
- 1930: Goulburn Valley Second Eighteens Football Association. Seven Teams – Ardmona, Benbatha, Dookie – Cosgrove, Lemnos, Mooroopna, Shepparton Imperials and Undera.
- 1931 & 1932: Katandra Football Association. Nine teams – Cosgrove, Dookie, Dookie Juniors, Drumanure, Katamatite, Katandra, Muckatah, Numurkah Imperials and Yabba.
- 1933 to 1937: Benalla Mulwala Football League. Teams – Benalla, Devenish, Dookie – Yabba, Mulwala, St. James, Tungamah, Wilby & Yarrawonga.
- 1938 & 1939: Benalla Tungamah Football League (Dookie – Yabba)
- 1940 & 1941: Goulburn Valley Football Association (Dookie – Yabba) Teams – Ardmona, Dookie – Yabba, Katandra, Lemnos, Mooroopna, Shepparton, Tallygaroopna, Toolamba
- 1942 to 1944: Club in recess due to World War II
- 1945: Goulburn Valley Football Association. Nine Teams – Ardmona, Dookie, Dookie College, Katandra, Mooroopna, Shepparton, Shepparton East, SPC & Tatura.
- 1946 to 1948: Central Goulburn Valley Football League. Teams – Ardmona, Dookie, Dookie College, Katandra, Mooroopna, Shepparton, Shepparton East, SPC, Tallygaroopna & Toolamba.
- 1949 to 1966: Benalla Tungamah Football League
- 1967 to 1976: Tungamah Football League

Dookie College Football Club

- 1927 & 1928: Goulburn Valley Second Eighteens Football Association
- 1939 & 1940: Tatong Thoona Football League
- 1941: Goulburn Valley Football Association
- 1942 to 1944: Club in recess, due to World War II
- 1945: Goulburn Valley Football Association
- 1946 to 1952: Central Goulburn Valley Football League
- 1947: Central Goulburn Valley Football League (firsts & seconds)
- 1948: Benalla & District Football League (seconds)
- 1953 to 1966: Benalla Tungamah Football League
- 1967 to 1976: Tungamah Football League

== Football Premierships ==
Dookie Football Club

Seniors

- Cahill Cup
  - 1893 – Dookie: 5.0 – 30 defeated Devenish: 0.0 – 0
- Dookie Football Association
  - 1906 – 1st: Dookie, 2nd: Devenish
  - 1912 – Dookie: 3.7 – 25 defeated Caniambo: 0.4 – 4
  - 1925 – Dookie: Minor Premiers. No finals.
- Katandra Football Association
  - 1912 – Dookie: 2.8 – 20 defeated Katandra: 2.3 – 15
- Benalla Tungamah Football League
  - 1962 – Dookie: 10.7 - 67 defeated Congupna: 8.11 - 59
  - 1965 – Dookie: 11.9 – 75 defeated Congupna: 7.10 – 52.

Dookie – Yabba Football Club

Seniors

- Katandra Football Association
  - 1932 – Dookie Yabba: 13.13 – 91 defeated Drumanure: 9.5 – 59.
- Mulwala Devenish Football League
  - 1933 – Dookie Yabba: 11.10 – 76 defeated Wilby: 10.6 – 66

Dookie College Football Club

Seniors

- Central Goulburn Valley Football League
  - 1952 – Dookie College: 16.6 – 102 defeated Katandra: 6.5 – 35
- Tungamah Football League
  - 1970 – Dookie College: 13.8 – 86 defeated Katandra: 11.11 – 77

Reserves

- Benalla & District Football League
  - 1948 – Dookie College: 8.22 – 70 defeated Goorambat: 2.11 – 23

In 1948, Dookie College Senior team played in the Central Goulburn Valley Football League, while their Reserves team played in the Benalla & District Football League competition.

Dookie United Football Club

Seniors

- Picola & District Football League
  - 2007 – Dookie United defeated Katandra by 23 points.

Thirds – Under 17's

- Picola & District Football League
  - 2009 – Dookie United: 7.5 – 47 defeated Tungamah: 6.9 – 45
  - 2010 – Dookie United: 17.23 – 125 defeated Katamatite: 4.1 – 25
  - 2012 – Dookie United: 5.12 – 42 defeated Tungamah: 5.6 – 36

== Football – Runners Up ==
Dookie Football Club

Seniors

- Dookie Football Association
  - 1907: Devenish: 1.12 – 18 defeated Dookie: 0.2 – 2.
  - 1914 – 1st: Devenish, 2nd: Dookie, on the ladder.
  - 1923: Yabba: 6.8 – 44 defeated Dookie: 2.3 – 15.
  - 1924 – Yabba: 6.10 – 46 defeated Dookie: 4.6 – 30
- Benalla Line Football Association
  - 1919: St. James: 6.8 – 44 defeated Dookie: 4.4 – 28
- Goulburn Valley Second Eighteens Football Association
  - 1926. Shepparton East: 14.11 – 95 defeated Dookie: 4.9 – 31
- Benalla Tungamah Football League
  - 1950 – Benalla 2nds: 8.16 – 64 defeated Dookie: 8.13 – 61

Dookie – Yabba Football Club

- Benalla Tungamah Football League
  - 1939 – Benalla: 15.16 – 106 defeated Dookie Yabba: 6.13 – 49

Dookie College Football Club

Seniors

- Benalla Tungamah Football League
  - 1953 – Burramine: 8.21 – 69 defeated Dookie College: 8.2 – 50
  - 1954 – Burramine: 11.8 – 74 defeated Dookie College: 9.11 – 65
  - 1957 – Katandra: 11.8 – 74 defeated Dookie College: 10.8 – 68
- Central Goulburn Valley Football League
  - 1950 – Katandra: 15.15 – 105 defeated Dookie College: 12.9 – 81
  - 1951 – Katandra: defeated Dookie College:
- Tungamah Football League
  - 1969 – Mulwala: 15.15 – 105 defeated Dookie College: 10.11 – 71

Dookie United Football Club

Seniors

- Tungamah Football League
  - 1977 – Katandra: 15.12 – 72 defeated Dookie United: 14.? – ?

== Football League – Best & Fairest winners ==
Dookie Football Club

Seniors

Tungamah Football League – Lawless Medal

- 1968: Terry Putt – Dookie

Dookie College Football Club

Seniors

Goulburn Valley Football Association – Shepparton Advertiser Trophy

- 1945: John McLeish – Dookie College

Central Goulburn Valley Football League – Shepparton Advertiser Trophy (1946 & 1947)

- 1948: Alex Slocombe – Dookie College

Central Goulburn Valley Football League – Hanlon Trophy (1948 to 1952)

- 1950 – John Landy – Dookie College

Benalla Tungamah Football League – Lawless Medal

- 1965: E Donovan – Dookie College

Tungamah Football League – Lawless Medal

- 1970: J Walduck – Dookie College
- 1971: D Read – Dookie College

Dookie United Football Club

Seniors

Central Goulburn Football League – Lawless Medal

- 1999: Chris Ludeman – Dookie United
- 2002: Luke Maher – Dookie United
- 2005: Scott Greig – Dookie United

ANZAC Medalist 2021:

- Bradley Wilson

== VFL / AFL players ==
The following footballers played with either – Dookie, Dookie College or Dookie United prior to playing senior VFL / AFL football.

- 1912 – Athol Milne – University
- 1913 – Pat Ryan – Carlton
- 1919 – Peter Ryan – St. Kilda
- 1925 – Albert Deagan – St.Kilda
- 1932 – Jim Park – Carlton
- 1943 – Noel Doherty – Richmond
- 1943 – Charlie Priestley – Richmond
- 1949 – John McLeish – Essendon
- 1954 – Jim McColl – Essendon
- 1958 – John McArthur – Hawthorn
- 1964 – Barrie Beattie – Footscray
- 1974 – John Moylan – North Melbourne & Footscray
- 2009 – Luke Lowden – Hawthorn

== Netball Premierships ==
A. Grade

Tungamah Football Netball League 1977 to 1995

- 1980

Goulburn Valley Football Netball League – Division Two. 1996 to 1998

- No premierships

Central Goulburn Football Netball League – 1999 to 2005

- 2005

Picola & District Football Netball League: 2006 to 2026

- 2026
