= Thornton-Eildon District Football & Netball Club =

Australian rules football team

Thornton-Eildon District

Names
- Full name: Thornton-Eildon District Football & Netball Club Inc
- Nickname: Shinboners

Club details
- Founded: 1957; 69 years ago
- Colours
- Competition: Outer East FNL
- Ground: Thornton Recreation Reserve

Uniforms
Home

The Thornton-Eildon District Football & Netball Club, nicknamed "The Shinboners" or "Boners" for short, is an Australian rules football team which competes in the Outer East Football Netball League.

== History ==
=== Origins ===
The Thornton Football Club, was founded in 1920 and competed in the Alexandra and Yea Football Association for 4 seasons. The club participated in that league until 1923 before closing the doors for four years. Thornton being a small town situated on the Goulburn River had a small population and often resulted in player shortages.

In 1929 they reformed and competed in the new Upper Goulburn Junior FA winning the premiership in 1931 and 1932. The competition merged with the Mansfield Line Association to form the Mansfield/Alexandra FA in 1934. Thornton were runners-up in the new competition but they later went into recess because of World War II.

Reforming again in 1945, the club won premierships in 1948 and were runners up in 1947.

The Acheron Valley Football Club had a short history, they formed at the same time Thornton reformed in 1929 and were part of the Upper Goulburn JFA for two seasons before going into recess because of the Great Depression. They again reform at the same time Thornton did in 1945.

In 1949 Thornton merged with Acheron Valley to form the Thornton – Acheron Valley Football Club and entered the Big league of the Waranga North East Football Association which was a very strong country league. The club adopted to the North Melbourne blue and white stripes that year. Initially successful the new club played off in the 1949 Grand Final only to lose to Broadford by three points. They were minor premiers in 1951 but went out in straight sets. By the mid-1950s the club was sliding down the ladder, finishing a distance last in 1955 and 1956. Needing an injection of more players the club looked at the expansion work of the Eildon Dam and the growing township of Eildon.

=== Thornton Eildon District Football Club ===
In 1957 the Thornton – Acheron Valley club expanded its recruitment zone by encompassing the township of Eildon and changing its name at the same time. The club now drew players from Eildon, Thornton, Taggerty, Buxton, Narbethong and Marysville. In 1961 won the 1961 premiership against Yea by eight points. In 1963 the club again played off in the grand final but lost to Euroa by six points.

In 1977 the WNEFL folded and the TEDFC decided to head over the ranges with Alexandra to the Yarra Valley Mountain Football League. The club battled through the years in the YVMDFL but made a Grand Final against Emerald in 1981. Television personality Ernie Dingo played that day at full forward.

In 1986 the club moved to the Benalla and District Football League and felt more at home in the country league with smaller towns as opposition. After finding their feet the seniors competed in four straight grand finals winning in 1991, 1992 and 1993 with the reserves winning in 1992. Full Forward, Shane ROWE, booted over 100 goals in 1993 including 18 in one game against Bonnie Doon.

In the early ’90s the club aligned themselves with netball and the girls competed at the same venue every week. In 1993 the A graders won the grand final.

After the 1994 season, the club transferred to the Goulburn Valley FNL – Division 2 which then became the Central Goulburn League. The Boners stayed in that league until it folded after the 2005 season.

At the demise of the CGFL the TEDFNC rejoined the Yarra Valley Mountain Football League with immediate results. The club played in 3 straight premierships, narrowly losing to Warburton by 8 points in 2006 before winning in 2007 by a staggering 98 points over Belgrave. In 2006 Ryan HALL kicked his 100th goal for the season in the grand final.

In the aftermath of the 2009 Black Saturday bushfires that affected many of the team's players and supporters, the club once again disbanded after the 2010 season. A few years later, the club reformed and joined the Yarra Valley Mountain Football League for season 2014.

In 2019 the Yarra Valley Mountain Football League merged with the South East Football Netball League to become the Outer East FNL

In 2020 the club couldn't field enough players and had to pull out of the season.

== Football Premierships ==
Thorton Football Club

Upper Goulburn Junior Football Association

- Juniors
  - 1931

Upper Goulburn Football Association

- Seniors
  - 1932, 1948

Thornton-Eildon District Football & Netball Club

Waranga North East Football Association

- Seniors
  - 1961 - Thorton Eildon: 12.8 - 80 d Yea: 8.13 - 61

Benalla & District Football League

- Seniors
  - 1991, 1992, 1993
- Reserves
  - 1992

Yarra Valley Mountain Football League

- Seniors
  - 2007

== Football League – Best & Fairest Winners ==
Alexandra & Mansfield District Football League

- M Adair Trophy
  - 1938 - Jack Patterson

Upper Goulburn Football Association

- Harry Graves Trophy
  - 1947 – Gordon Long
  - 1948 – Gordon Long

Waranga North East Football Association

- Keith Bryant Trophy
  - 1959 - Ian Hughes
  - 1960 - Ian Hughes. Hughes also won this award in 1957, when playing with Euroa.
  - 1963 - Ross Coller
  - 1966 - Peter Tossol Snr

Tungamah Football League

- Lawless Family Medal
  - 1986 & 1989 - John Tossol

== VFL / AFL players ==
The following played TEDFNC and VFL / AFL senior football.

- 1937 - Ray Gillett - South Melbourne
- 1947 – Eddie Jackson Melbourne
- 1953 – Ron McCarthy – Western Bulldogs
- 1956 – Peter Tossol Senior – Melbourne. Seconds only.
- 1969 – Jeff Bates – Geelong
- 1970 – Lloyd Burgmann – Melbourne
- 1973 – Robert Elliott – St Kilda, Melbourne
- 1979 – John Wallace – Melbourne
- 1981 – John Tossol – Melbourne
- 1982 – Peter Tossol Junior – Melbourne
- 2008 – Caleb Tiller – Carlton. Pick Number 80 in the 2008 AFL draft.
- 2017 – Robbie Fox – Sydney
