= Congupna Football Club =

Australian rules football and netball club

Congupna Football & Netball Club

Names
- Full name: Congupna Football & Netball Club
- Nickname: "The Road"
- Club song: "It's a Grand Old Flag"

Club details
- Founded: 1956; 70 years ago
- Colours
- Competition: Murray Football League
- President: Debbie McColl
- Coach: Josh Chapman
- Captain: Daniel Schaper
- Premierships: Senior Premierships (9) 1956, 1963, 1964, 1971, 1978, 1991, 1993, 2024, 2026 Senior Runner-Up (10) 1957, 1960, 1962, 1965, 1967, 1975, 1982, 1998, 2023, 2025
- Ground: Memorial Park – Congupna Recreation Reserve

Uniforms
1956–1961	1962–2012	2013 – Current

Other information
- Official website: https://congupnafnc.com/

The Congupna Football & Netball Club, nicknamed "The Road", is an Australian rules football and netball club based in the town of Congupna located just north of Shepparton, Victoria, that currently compete in the Murray FNL.

== History ==
A "Congupna" football club (with no ties with the current club) played in the Goulburn Valley Football Association from 1891 to 1906, being runner-up five times.

Congupna Road Football Club (named after the township of the same name) was formed in 1956 and won the senior premiership of the Kyabram & District Football Association in its first season. From 1956 until 1961, Congupna Road participated in the colours of dark navy with a white 'CFC' monogram. Congupna Road then transferred across to the Benalla Tungamah Football League in 1962. It was at this time when the club changed its colours to red with a white 'vee'. Senior football premierships followed in 1963 & 1964.

In 1963, the word "Road" was officially dropped from the town of Congupna Road. The football club took a year to catch up after the word "Road" was removed from the town name and won a premiership in 1963 as the Congupna Road Football Club. In 1964, the club won the premiership as the Congupna Football Club.

The Benalla Tungamah Football League changed its name in 1967 to the Tungamah Football League.

Congupna won Tungamah Football League senior premierships in 1971, 1978, 1991 & 1993.

Congupna's Memorial Park hosted the last ever Tungamah Football League Grand Final in 1995 before it changed its name to Goulburn Valley Football League – Division Two.

The club joined the Murray Football League in 1997, making the grand final in just its second season in the competition (1998), losing to Cobram by 33 points.

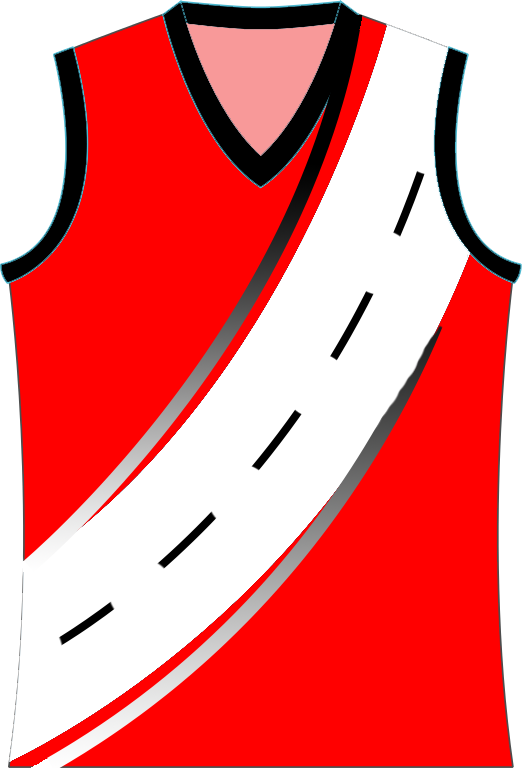
Congupna Football Club Jumper (2013 – Current)

At the beginning of the 2013 season, the Congupna Football Club changed to its current, more modern jumper style, red with a white 'sash'. The guernseys, still in Congupna's traditional red and white, now feature a road – complete with dotted line – as a diagonal sash.

Season 2023 saw Congupna finish in 2nd spot on the ladder after the Home & Away season and ultimately lost the Grand Final to Mulwala by 33 points, with the exact same score line as their 1998 Grand Final loss to Cobram.

The following year, 2024, Congupna won all but one match on its way to a 1-point Grand Final victory over Finley (9.11–65 to 9.10–64) to claim their first senior football premiership in 31 years.

Congupna went undefeated during the 2025 season, with 18 wins. The Club averaged a winning margin of 110 points per game. On a quarter-by-quarter level, Congupna won each of its first 69 quarters of the season outright. Only two quarters were conceded during the entire home-and-away fixture – both occurring in their Round 18 match against Cobram, where they dropped the second and fourth terms. Meeting Cobram in the Grand Final, Congupna were defeated by three points, kicking 5.21 to 8.6 (26 scoring shots to 14), and losing the premiership.

The 2026 season saw Congupna produce another extraordinary campaign. The Seniors lost just one match throughout the home-and-away season, while also recording one draw, before advancing to the Murray Football League grand final against second-placed Cobram. The Reserves, having finished third on the ladder after the home-and-away season, also progressed through to the grand final, where they faced a highly fancied Moama outfit. In a rematch of both the previous year's grand finals, Congupna Seniors prevailed over Cobram, securing an eight-point victory, 14.06 (90) to 11.16 (82). The win delivered the club its second Senior Football Premiership in the Murray Football League and its second Senior Premiership in just three years. Earlier in the day, Congupna Reserves had also tasted premiership success, defeating Moama by 50 points, 12.10 (82) to 04.08 (32). The two victories secured a rare Senior and Reserves Premiership double for Congupna – a feat that had not been achieved in the Murray Football League since Deniliquin in 2001.

== Club Song ==
The official Congupna Football Club song is called "It's a Grand Old Flag" (sung to the tune of George M. Cohan's 1906 song "You're a Grand Old Flag“).

"It’s a Grand old flag, It’s a high-flying flag,

It’s the emblem for me and for you.

It’s the emblem of the team we love,

The team of the Red and the White.

Every heart beats right for the Red and the White,

As we sing this song to you………what do we sing?

Should old acquaintance be forgot,

Keep your eyes on the Red and the White."

== Competition Timeline ==
- Kyabram District Football Association: 1956 to 1959
- Kyabram District Football League: (name change): 1960 to 1961
- Benalla Tungamah Football League: 1962 to 1966
- Tungamah Football League (name change): 1967 to 1995
- Goulburn Valley Football League – Div 2: 1996
- Murray Football League: 1997 to Present

== Premierships (Seniors) ==
Kyabram District Football Association / League: 1956 to 1961

Year	Premiers	Score		Runner-Up	Score
1956	Congupna	10.10 – 70	vs	Merrigum	09.04 – 58

Benalla Tungamah Football League: 1962 to 1966

Year	Premiers	Score		Runner-Up	Score
1963	Congupna	10.09 – 69	vs	Mulwala	04.11 – 35
1964	Congupna	12.15 – 87	vs	Tungamah	08.14 – 62

Tungamah Football League: 1967 to 1995

1971 Tungamah FL Senior Grand Final
Year	Premiers	Score		Runner-Up	Score
1971	Congupna	16.17 – 113	vs	Katandra	14.12 – 96

1978 Tungamah FL Senior Grand Final
Year	Premiers	Q1	Q2	Q3	Q4	Score		Runner-Up	Q1	Q2	Q3	Q4	Score
1978	Congupna	8.4	10.6	14.12	15.16	15.16 – 106	vs	Katandra	3.1	8.9	11.13	15.14	15.14 – 104
1978	Congupna	52	66	96	106	15.16 – 106	vs	Katandra	19	57	79	104	15.14 – 104

Goals

Congupna: J. Hueston 5, C. Drum 3, B. Drum 3, C. Lyle, J. Kerr, A. Bicknell, B. Phillips

Katandra: R. LeLiever 4, D. Wilkie 4, L. Burgmann 3, G. Rowan 2, R. Sidebottom, R. Kendall

Best

Congupna: G. Franze, J. Cooper, B. Phillips, A. Hueston, A. Bicknell, B. Leaf

Katandra: D. Wilkie, G. Teague, R. Sidebottom, K. Teague, C. Senior, P. Wickham

1991 Tungamah FL Senior Grand Final
Year	Premiers	Q1	Q2	Q3	Q4	Score		Runner-Up	Q1	Q2	Q3	Q4	Score
1991	Congupna	2.6	3.6	5.10	6.12	06.12 – 48	vs	Katandra	1.0	3.11	3.11	3.16	03.16 – 34
1991	Congupna	18	24	40	48	06.12 – 48	vs	Katandra	6	29	29	34	03.16 – 34

Goals

Congupna: P. Murray, X. Tanner, M. Simsen, P. Hicks, R. Warburton, R. Van Den Driest

Katandra: G. Teague, P. Squire, B. Fuller

Best

Congupna: X. Tanner, B. Drummond, P. Hicks, R. Van Den Driest, R. McColl, C. Bowe

Katandra: D. Bassett, W. Grinter, B. Fuller, A. Kilmartin, B. Collins, R. Sidebottom

1993 Tungamah FL Senior Grand Final
Year	Premiers	Q1	Q2	Q3	Q4	Score		Runner-Up	Q1	Q2	Q3	Q4	Score
1993	Congupna	4.3	7.9	12.11	15.12	15.12 – 102	vs	Benalla All Blacks	7.3	9.4	13.5	15.7	15.07 – 97
1993	Congupna	27	51	83	102	15.12 – 102	vs	Benalla All Blacks	45	58	83	97	15.07 – 97

Goals

Congupna: P. Murray 7, R. Warburton 6, D. Crowe, A. Bicknell

All Blacks: D. Sharpe 3, A. Rolls 3, A. Putt 2, P. Woods 2, J. Martiniello 2, J. Beaton, S. Coutts, S. Allen

Best

Congupna: X. Tanner, A. Woods, R. Van Den Driest, P. Storer, R. Warburton, P. Murray

All Blacks: J. Martiniello, J. Beaton, D. Wright, D. Putt, H. Davidson, L. Gilchrist

Murray Football League: 1997 to Present

2024 Murray FL Senior Grand Final
Year	Premiers	Q1	Q2	Q3	Q4	Score		Runner-Up	Q1	Q2	Q3	Q4	Score
2024	Congupna	2.2	3.5	7.8	9.11	09.11 – 65	vs	Finley	1.2	2.4	3.8	9.10	09.10 – 64
2024	Congupna	14	23	50	65	09.11 – 65	vs	Finley	8	16	26	64	09.10 – 64

Goals

Congupna: J. Trewin 4, D. Schaper 2, K. Mueller 2, J. Norman

Finley: M. Carson 2, J. White, T. Lang, N Burns, Z. Brain, L. Moore, L. Hawkins, A. Robertson

Best

Congupna: S. Buxton, J. Boyer, J. Trewin, R. Damianopoulos, B. Squire, C. Boyer

Finley: L. Moore, K. Sharp, M. Carson, A. Robertson. J. White, T. Lang

2026 Murray FL Senior Grand Final
Year	Premiers	Q1	Q2	Q3	Q4	Score		Runner-Up	Q1	Q2	Q3	Q4	Score
2026	Congupna	4.0	8.0	11.4	14.6	14.06 – 90	vs	Cobram	4.4	5.9	8.11	11.16	11.16 – 82
2026	Congupna	24	48	70	90	14.06 – 90	vs	Cobram	28	39	59	82	11.16 – 82

Goals

Congupna: K. Mueller 3, D. Schaper 2, J. Norman 2, R. Mifka 2, C. Mellington 2, S. Poole, S. Slavich, W. Norman

Cobram: B. Ryan 4, L. Allen 2, T. Baden 2, J. Murray, P. Lewis-Smith, E. Hyde

Best

Congupna: B. Squire, S. Slavich, D. Schaper, C. Di Bella, J. Boyer, J Gee

Cobram: S. Beasley, B. Calogero, L. Allen, E. Hyde, B. Ryan, B. Roberts

== Runner-Up (Seniors) ==
Kyabram District Football Association: 1956 to 1959

Year	Premiers	Score		Runner-Up	Score
1957	Merrigum	10.06 – 66	vs	Congupna	06.06 – 42

Kyabram District Football League (name change): 1960 to 1961

Year	Premiers	Score		Runner-Up	Score
1960	Shepparton East	11.12 – 78	vs	Congupna	07.06 – 48

Benalla Tungamah Football League: 1962 to 1966

Year	Premiers	Score		Runner-Up	Score
1962	Dookie	10.07 – 67	vs	Congupna	08.11 – 59
1965	Dookie	11.09 – 75	vs	Congupna	07.10 – 52

Tungamah Football League (name change): 1967 to 1995

Year	Premiers	Score		Runner-up	Score
1967	Wilby	11.16 – 82	vs	Congupna	07.12 – 54
1975	Katandra	19.23 – 137	vs	Congupna	10.13 – 73
1982	Shepparton East	18.14 – 122	vs	Congupna	14.12 – 96

Murray Football League: 1997 to Present

Year	Premiers	Score		Runner-Up	Score
1998	Cobram	14.14 – 98	vs	Congupna	09.11 – 65
2023	Mulwala	14.14 – 98	vs	Congupna	09.11 – 65
2025	Cobram	08.06-54	vs	Congupna	05.21–51

== Premierships & Runner-Up (Reserves) ==
Benalla Tungamah Football League: 1962 to 1966

- 1963 – Runner-Up
- 1964 – Runner-Up
- 1965 – Premiers
- 1966 – Premiers

Tungamah Football League (name change): 1967 to 1995

- 1967 – Premiers
- 1969 – Runner-Up
- 1971 – Premiers
- 1972 – Runner-Up
- 1973 – Premiers
- 1974 – Premiers
- 1979 – Premiers
- 1987 – Premiers
- 1992 – Runner-Up
- 1993 – Premiers
- 1994 – Runner-Up
- 1995 – Runner-Up

Goulburn Valley Football League – Div 2: 1996

- 1996 – Runner-Up

Murray Football League: 1997 to Present

- 2023 – Premiers
- 2025 – Runner-Up
- 2026 – Premiers

== Premierships & Runner-Up (Thirds) ==
Tungamah Football League: 1967 to 1995

- 1967 – Premiers
- 1968 – Premiers
- 1971 – Runner-Up
- 1976 – Premiers
- 1977 – Premiers

Goulburn Valley Football League – Div 2: 1996

Murray Football League: 1997 to Present

- 2007 – Premiers
- 2011 – Premiers
- 2012 – Premiers

== Premierships & Runner-Up (Fourths) ==
Tungamah Football League: 1967 to 1995

- 1991 – Premiers
- 1992 – Premiers
- 1995 – Runner-Up

Goulburn Valley Football League – Div 2: 1996

- 1996 – Runner-Up

Murray Football League: 1997 to Present

- 2000 – Premiers
- 2001 – Premiers
- 2002 – Runner-Up
- 2003 – Runner-Up
- 2005 – Runner-Up
- 2009 – Premiers

== League Best & Fairest Winners (Seniors) ==
Kyabram District Football Association: 1956 to 1961 – (McNamara Medal)

- 1957 – W Roe

Benalla Tungamah Football League: 1962 to 1966 – (Lawless Family Medal)

- 1963 – Harry Brittain

Tungamah Football League: 1967 to 1995 – (Lawless Family Medal)

- 1980 – Damian Drum
- 1983 – Chris Drum
- 1995 – Stuart Joyce

Goulburn Valley Football League – Div 2: 1996 – (Lawless Family Medal)

- Nil

Murray Football League: 1997 to Present – (O'Dwyer Medal)

- 1998 – Shaun Gordon

== League Leading Goal Kicking Winners (Seniors) ==
Kyabram District Football Association: 1956 to 1961

- 1959 – Jim Baker – (106) – (113 inc. finals)
- 1961 – William Betson – (87) – (91 inc. finals)

Benalla Tungamah Football League: 1962 to 1966

- 1964 – Kevin Keenan (51)

Tungamah Football League: 1967 to 1995

- 1978 – Chris Drum (115) – (126 inc. finals)
- 1991 – Phil Murray (74) – (84 inc. finals)

Goulburn Valley Football League – Div 2: 1996

- 1996 – Guy Madigan (101) – (117 inc. finals)

Murray Football League: 1997 to Present

- 1999 – Guy Madigan – (82)
- 2021 – Daniel Campbell – (43)
- 2022 – Daniel Campbell – (61) – (62 inc. finals)
- 2024 – Kyle Mueller – (95) – (101 inc. finals)
- 2025 – Kyle Mueller – (88) – (94 inc. finals)

== Club Records (Seniors) ==
Individual

Most Games – Chris Drum (284)

Most Goals (season) – Chris Drum (126) – 1978

Most Goals (game) – Chris Drum (15) vs Benalla All Blacks – Rd. 8, 1978.

Most Goals (game) – Kyle Mueller (15) vs Barooga – Rd.17, 2024.

Club

Most Consecutive Games Won – (33) – Rd.7, 2024 to 2nd Semi Final, 2025.

Most Consecutive Quarters Won – (69) – Rd.1 (Qtr.1) 2025 to Rd.18 (Qtr.1) 2025.

== 200 Games (Seniors) ==
- Don Dempster – 1973-08-25 – (200 games)
- Geoff Weppner – 1979-06-09 – (225 games)
- Alan Hueston – 1981-07-04 – (209 games)
- Chris Drum – 1984-08-25 – (284 games)
- Michael Gleeson – 2001-08-11 – (217 games)
- Tate Mifka – 2026-06-20 – (200+ games)

== Team of the Half-Century – 1956 to 2005 ==
In 2006, Congupna Football & Netball Club celebrated its 50th anniversary. The Club decided to honour the past players of its 50-year history with a team of each decade as well as an overall Team of the Half Century. These teams were decided by a panel of Past Senior Coaches.

Congupna Team of the Half Century
B:	Don Dempster	Peter Pyle	Denis Smyth
HB:	Mick Gleeson	Pat Storer	Phil Stevenson
C:	Mark Simsen	Damian Drum	Gerald Farrell
HF:	Xavier Tanner	Chris Drum (Captain)	Ted Pedretti
F:	Ashley Bicknell	Guy Madigan	Alan Hueston
Foll:	Jock O'Conner	Stuart Joyce	Shaun Gordon
Int:	Andrew Woods	John Hueston	
Int:	Darren Humphrey	Jim Horridge	
Res:	Bryan Leaf	Ken Pettie	Geoff Weppner
Coach:	Jock O'Conner		

== Senior Football Honourboard ==
Year	President	Secretary	Senior Coach	Senior Captain	Senior Best & Fairest	Senior Leading Goalkicker	Position
Kyabram District Football Association
1956	R. J. Jeffery	M. Drum	W. B. Roe	W. B. Roe	W. C. Harris		1st
1957	W. A. Farrell	M. Drum	W. B. Roe	W. B. Roe	A. F. Grundrill		2nd
1958	W. A. Farrell	M. Drum	W. B. Roe	W. B. Roe	A. E. Jones		4th
1959	W. A. Farrell	M. Drum	A. E. Jones	A. E. Jones	R. P. Payne		3rd
1960	W. A. Farrell	J. J. Smith	A. E. Jones	A. E. Jones	R. P. Payne ^{2}		2nd
1961	W. A. Farrell	M. Drum	J. O'Connor	J. O'Connor	G. Flanagan		3rd
Benalla Tungamah Football League
1962	W. A. Farrell	M. Drum	J. O'Connor	J. O'Connor	R. Collins		2nd
1963	W. A. Farrell	M. Drum	J. O'Connor	J. O'Connor	R. Bush		1st
1964	W. A. Farrell	M. Drum	J. O'Connor	J. O'Connor	H. Brittain		1st
1965	W. A. Farrell	M. Drum	J. O'Connor	J. O'Connor	D. Dempster		2nd
1966	W. A. Farrell	M. Drum	B. Hampel	B. Hampel	K. Keating		6th
Tungamah Football League
1967	J. A. Phillips	M. Drum	D. Smyth	D. Smyth	N. Crosby		2nd
1968	J. A. Phillips	M. Drum	D. Smyth	D. Smyth	M. Farrell		3rd
1969	J. A. Phillips	M. Drum	D. Smyth	D. Smyth	D. Dempster ^{2}		5th
1970	J. A. Phillips	M. Drum	D. Smyth	D. Smyth	B. Osborne		6th
1971	J. A. Phillips	R. M. Phillips	D. Smyth	D. Smyth	A. Hueston		1st
1972	J. A. Phillips	R. M. Phillips	D. Smyth	D. Smyth	J. Horridge		3rd
1973	J. A. Phillips	R. M. Phillips	D. Smyth	D. Smyth	A. Hueston ^{2}	C. Drum	3rd
1974	J. A. Phillips	R. M. Phillips	R. Dobson	R. Dobson	S. Mitchell	C. Drum	4th
1975	J. A. Farrell	R. M. Phillips	J. Hueston	J. Hueston	J. Horridge ^{2}		2nd
1976	J. A. Farrell	R. M. Phillips	J. Hueston	J. Hueston	C. Drum	C. Drum	4th
1977	J. C. Cuthbert	R. M. Phillips	J. Hueston	J. Hueston	C. Drum ^{2}	C. Drum	5th
1978	J. C. Cuthbert	R. M. Phillips	P. Stevenson	P. Stevenson	C. Drum ^{3}	C. Drum (126)	1st
1979	M. J. Mathisen	R. M. Phillips	P. Stevenson	P. Stevenson	A. Bicknell		4th
1980	M. J. Mathisen	R. M. Phillips	C. Drum	C. Drum	D. Drum	C. Drum	3rd
1981	M. J. Mathisen	R. M. Phillips	C. Drum	C. Drum	B. Leaf		8th
1982	J. A. Phillips	M. J. Mathisen	T. Keenan	T. Keenan	D. Rudd		2nd
1983	G. Chaffey	A. Hueston	T. Keenan	T. Keenan	C. Kirvan		4th
1984	J. Farrell	A. Hueston	C. Bowe	C. Bowe	T. Kennedy	C. Drum	6th
1985	J. Farrell	A. Hueston	C. Bowe	C. Bowe	P. Pyle		8th
1986	J. Farrell	A. Hueston	R. Warburton	R. Warburton	C. Drum ^{4}	C. Drum	9th
1987	J. Farrell	C. Drum	T. Connors	C. Bowe	T. Pedretti	C. Drum	9th
1988	J. Farrell	G. Reid	T. Connors	P. Pyle	M. France	C. Drum	7th
1989	G. McKinnis	D. Moon	W. Hovey	R. Moon	R. Moon K. Pickering	C. Drum	7th
1990	C. Drum	D. Moon	W. Hovey	C. Ford	R. McColl		7th
1991	C. Drum	D. Moon	X. Tanner	X. Tanner	P. Pyle ^{2} M. Simsen		1st
1992	C. Drum	D. Moon	X. Tanner	X. Tanner	X. Tanner		3rd
1993	C. Drum	J. Pickering	X. Tanner	X. Tanner	S. Murdoch		1st
1994	C. Drum	D. Warburton	X. Tanner	X. Tanner	M. Tucker		4th
1995	C. Drum	D. Warburton	K. Storer	K. Storer	S. Joyce		3rd
Goulburn Valley Football League – Division 2
1996	C. Drum	D. McColl	X. Tanner	P. Hewitt	P. Hewitt		3rd
Murray Football League
1997	C. Drum	F. O'Connell	X. Tanner	X. Tanner	S. Gordon	G. Madigan	6th
1998	C. Drum	D. Lucas	M. Gurrie	M. Gurrie	S. Gordon ^{2}	C. Farrell	2nd
1999	C. Drum	J. Pickering	M. Gurrie	K. Pettie	M. Hyland	G. Madigan	6th
2000	T. Woods	J. Pickering	P. Cardamone	K. Pettie	M. Hyland ^{2}	G. Madigan	6th
2001	T. Woods	J. Pickering	M. Gleeson	K. Pettie	B. Jaques	M. Tucker	12th
2002	K. O'Donoghue	K. Paquola	G. Harvey	B. Jaques	M. Hodgetts	B. Jaques	11th
2003	K. O'Donoghue	M. Holding	G. Harvey	B. Jaques	T. Zak	R. Osborne	6th
2004	K. O'Donoghue	D. McColl	G. Harvey	M. Hodgetts	A. Brunt	R. Osborne	7th
2005	K. O'Donoghue	K. Mellington	G. Harvey	M. Hodgetts	T. Betson	G. Madigan	12th
2006	C. Drum	C. Cummins	T. Hampshire	G. Wolfell	E. Reeves	G. Madigan	6th
2007	C. Drum	J. Pickering	T. Hampshire	G. Wolfell	S. Emmett	B. Vance	6th
2008	C. Drum	J. Pickering	T. Hampshire	E. Reeves G. Archer	S. Emmett ^{2}	E. Reeves	12th
2009	D. McColl	R. Kortum	T. Hampshire	E. Reeves G. Archer	S. Emmett ^{3}	E. Reeves	6th
2010	D. McColl	D. McColl	S. Daniel	E. Reeves	A. Douglas	H. Braton	8th
2011	D. McColl	R. Cuthbert	M. O'Mera	D. Burness	E. Reeves ^{2}	E. Reeves	12th
2012	D. McColl	R. Cuthbert	M. O'Mera	A. Parker	T. Sidebottom	R. Sidebottom	5th
2013	D. McColl	K. Tucker	K. O'Donoghue	M. Sidebottom	K. Greening	M. Sidebottom M. Hodgetts	8th
2014	D. McColl	K. Tucker	K. O'Donoghue	M. Sidebottom	T. Mifka	J. Cosatits	9th
2015	D. McColl	B. McLeod	K. O'Donoghue	T. Mifka D. Bowels	T. Mifka ^{2}	B. Webster	11th
2016	D. McColl	M. Dwyer	G. Shannon	S. Ferguson	S. Ferguson	D. Hammer	12th
2017	G. Jacobson	P. Culpan	T. McKenzie	S. Ferguson	A. Overs	T. McKenzie	10th
2018	G. Jacobson	G. Jacobson M. Dwyer	D. Gee	S. Ferguson	B. Squire	D. Schaper	11th
2019	G. Jacobson	G. Jacobson M. Dwyer	D. Gee J. Chapman	S. Ferguson	B. Squire ^{2}	D. Campbell	3rd
2020	G. Jacobson	D. McColl	P. Sheehan	J. Chapman	n/a	n/a	n/a
2021	J. Hicks	T. Phillips	P. Sheehan	J. Chapman	J. Boyer	D. Campbell	n/a
2022	J. Hicks	T. Phillips	K. O'Donoghue	D. Schaper	J. Boyer ^{2}	D. Campbell	5th
2023	J. Hicks	T. Phillips	K. O'Donoghue B. Bingham	D. Schaper	J. Boyer ^{3}	E. Cavallaro	2nd
2024	J. Hicks	T. Phillips	B. Bingham	D. Schaper	J. Norman	K. Mueller	1st
2025	D. McColl	E. McColl	B. Bingham	D. Schaper	B. Squire ^{3}	K. Mueller	2nd
2026	D. McColl		B. Bingham	D. Schaper	B. Squire ^{4}	D. Schaper	1st

== Netball – Premierships (A Grade) ==
Tungamah Football League: 1967 to 1995

- 1968 – Premiers
- 1972 – Premiers
- 1977 – Premiers
- 1978 – Premiers
- 1981 – Premiers
- 1982 – Premiers
- 1984 – Premiers
- 1986 – Premiers

Goulburn Valley Football League – Div 2: 1996

- 1996 – Premiers

Murray Football League: 1997 to Present

== Netball – League Best & Fairest Winners (A Grade) ==
Tungamah Football League: 1967 to 1995

- 1968 – Kerry Drum (Bourke)
- 1972 – Pamela Hueston
- 1973 – Pamela Hueston
- 1974 – Pamela Hueston
- 1975 – Pamela Hueston
- 1977 – Pamela Hueston
- 1978 – Pamela Hueston
- 1981 – Pamela Hueston
- 1982 – Pamela Hueston
- 1984 – Marg Tait
- 1986 – Tracey Wilson
- 1987 – Tracey Wilson
- 1989 – Jodi Willmott
- 1990 – Sue Robinson (Howard)
- 1992 – Helen Stevenson (Jackson)

Goulburn Valley Football League – Div 2: 1996

Murray Football League: 1997 to Present

- 2001 – Paula Ryan

== Life Members ==
- W. Roe – 1958
- R. Jeffery – 1960
- S.A. Phillips – 1961
- J.J. Smith – 1962
- J.A Phillips – 1963
- J. O'Conner – 1963
- M. Drum – 1964
- W.A. Farrell – 1964
- K. Hall – 1965
- W. Drum – 1965
- L. Phillips – 1965
- J.N. Farrell – 1965
- R. Carnie – 1966
- Mrs. A. Gundrill – 1968
- D. Smyth – 1971
- E. Grace – 1971
- D. Dempster- 1973
- Mrs. P. Drum – 1978
- A. Hueston – 1978
- G. Weppner – 1978
- G. Scott – 1978
- J. Farrell – 1978
- T.H. Waite – 1979
- C. Moore – 1979
- R.M. Phillips – 1980
- H.J. Phillips – 1980
- C. Drum – 1981
- M. Florence – 1981
- E. Lorains – 1982
- C. Pickering – 1982
- Mrs. P. Hueston – 1983
- M. Pedretti – 1984
- Mrs. J. Pickering – 1984
- S. Muzzi – 1986
- Mrs. M. Farrell – 1988
- Mrs. P. Pedretti – 1989
- P. Farrell – 1990
- J. Pedretti – 1990
- V. Drum – 1990
- R. Wellington – 1991
- B. Shillington – 1991
- D. Scott – 1993
- D. McColl – 1996
- T. Woods – 1996
- P. Pyle – 1996
- K. Lancaster – 1997
- B. Mason – 2000
- M. Gleeson – 2001
- A. Bicknell – 2003
- K. Pettie – 2003
- K. O'Donoughue – 2007
- W. Sidebottom – 2008
- H. Drum – 2008
- B. Bicknell – 2010
- S. Allen – 2010
- R. Moon – 2010
- M. Tucker – 2013
- H. Jackson
- S. Howard
- N. Jeffery
- S. Kilpatrick
- L. Madigan
- R. McColl
- K. Mellington
- J. O'Donoghue
- B. Robinson
- I. Scott
- R. Cuthbert
- D. Gee
- J. Gee – 2023
- G. Jacobson – 2023
- C. Allen – 2025
- G. Mifka – 2026
- T. Mifka – 2026

== VFL/AFL Players/Coaches ==
- Damian Drum – Geelong (63 games, 1982–1989)
  - Fremantle (Coach – 53 games, 1999–2001)
- Richard Ambrose – Essendon (0 games, 1991–1992) and Sydney (3 games, 1993)
- Simon Eastaugh – Richmond (0 games, 1990–1993), Essendon (17 games, 1998–1999) and Fremantle (12 games, 2001–2002)
- Jason Traianidis – St Kilda (62 games, 1996–2001)
- Steven King – Geelong (193 games, 1996–2007) and St Kilda (47 games, 2008–2010)
  - Gold Coast (Caretaker Coach – 7 games, 2023)
  - Melbourne (Coach, 2026–Present)
- Marc Bullen – Essendon (44 games, 2001–2005)
- Shannon Byrnes – Geelong (108 games, 2004–2012) and Melbourne (23 games, 2013–2014)
- Marcus Drum – Fremantle (22 games, 2006–2009) and Geelong (0 games, 2010–2011)
- Tim Looby – Port Adelaide (Rookie Listed – 0 games, 2006)
- Michael Barlow – Fremantle (126 games, 2010–2016) and Gold Coast (15 games, 2017–2018)
- Steele Sidebottom – Collingwood – (375 games, 2009–2026)
