= Jock Ball =

Australian rules footballer, born 1912

Personal information
- Full name: Harold Samuel Gordon Ball
- Born: 16 February 1912; Yarrawonga, Victoria
- Died: 3 June 1993 (aged 81)
- Original team: Yarrawonga
- Height: 178 cm (5 ft 10 in)
- Weight: 76 kg (168 lb)

Playing career^{1}
Years	Club	Games (Goals)
1935–37	Melbourne	11 (0)
- ^{1} Playing statistics correct to the end of 1937.

Harold Samuel Gordon "Jock" Ball (16 February 1912 – 3 June 1993) was an Australian rules footballer who played with Melbourne in the Victorian Football League (VFL).

Ball won the Ovens and Murray Football League best and fairest award, the Morris Medal in 1934, when playing for Yarrawonga Football Club.
