= Benalla Tungamah Football League =

Australian rules football league

- Formerly: Tungamah Football League, Goulburn Valley Football League – Division Two, Central Goulburn Football League
- Founded: 1938
- Folded: 2005

The Benalla Tungamah Football League (TBFL) was established in May, 1938, from the following North Eastern Victoria, Australian rules football clubs – Benalla, Devenish, Katamatite, St. James, Tungamah and Yabba – Dookie.

== History ==
The Benalla Tungamah Football League (BTFL) was established in May, 1938, from the following North Eastern Victorian, Australian rules football clubs – Benalla, Devenish, Katamatite, St. James, Tungamah and Yabba – Dookie.

This newly formed league came about when Mulwala Football Club left the Benalla Mulwala Football League to join the Coreen & District Football League in 1938.

The BTFL went into recess from 1940 to 1947 due to World War II and was reformed in March, 1948.

In 1951, 12 teams competed in the BTFL.

Benalla made six grand finals in their seven years in the BTFL, winning three premierships, before Benalla and Wangaratta reserves sides both entered the Ovens and Murray Football League's newly formed seconds competition in 1953.

The BTFL changed its name to the Tungamah Football League in 1967.

In 1996, the league changed its name to the Goulburn Valley Football League – Division Two competition. The GVFL absorbed the clubs from the Tungamah Football League and had a second division for three years (1996–1998).

Then in 1999, the league's name was changed to the Central Goulburn Football Netball League, which lasted until 2005, when club's went into other competitions under the demise of the VCFL. The CGFNL had four grades of football – Seniors, Reserves, Under 17's and Under 14's, plus five grades of netball – A, B, B Reserve, D & E Grade.

The Lawless family donated a medal to the senior football best and fairest winners from 1954 to 2005, across the four different football league names.

Interestingly, Alexandra's George Steiner won three league best and fairest Lawless Medals, one in each of the following – Tungamah Football League – 1994, Goulburn Valley – Division Two – 1996 and Central Goulburn Football League – 2000.

== Clubs ==
=== Central Goulburn Football League (1999-2005) ===
==== Final clubs ====
Club	Colours	Nickname	Home Ground	Former League	Est.	CGFL Seasons	CGFL Senior Premierships		Fate
Club	Colours	Nickname	Home Ground	Former League	Est.	CGFL Seasons	Total	Years	Fate
Alexandra		Rebels	Alexandra Showgrounds, Alexandra	GVFL	1872	1999-2005	1	2000	Moved to Yarra Valley Mountain District FL in 2006
Dookie United		Kangaroos	Dookie Recreation Reserve, Dookie	GVFL	1977	1999-2005	0	-	Moved to Picola & District FNL in 2006
Rumbalara		Rumba	Rumbalara Recreation Reserve, Shepparton	GVFL	1997	1999-2005	2	1999, 2002	Moved to Murray FNL in 2006
Shepparton East		Bombers	Central Park Recreation Reserve, Shepparton East	GVFL	1924	1999-2005	2	2001, 2004	Moved to Picola & District FNL in 2006
Thornton-Eildon		Shinboners	Thornton Recreation Reserve, Thornton	GVFL	1949	1999-2005	0	-	Moved to Yarra Valley Mountain District FL in 2006
Violet Town		Towners	Violet Town Recreation Reserve, Violet Town	GVFL	1880	1999-2005	0	-	Moved to Kyabram District FNL in 2006
Yea		Tigers	Yea Showgrounds, Yea	GVFL	1887	1999-2005	2	2003, 2005	Moved to Kyabram District FNL in 2006

==== Former clubs ====
Club	Colours	Nickname	Home Ground	Former League	Est.	CGFL Seasons	CGFL Senior Premierships		Fate
Club	Colours	Nickname	Home Ground	Former League	Est.	CGFL Seasons	Total	Years	Fate
Benalla All-Blacks		Panthers	Friendlies Oval, Benalla	GVFL	1934	1999-2004	0	-	Moved to Ovens & King FL in 2004

=== Benalla Tungamah/Tungamah Football League (1938-1995) ===
==== Final clubs ====
Club	Colours	Nickname	Home Ground	Former League	Est.	BTFL/TFNL Seasons	BTFL/TFL Senior Premierships		Fate
Club	Colours	Nickname	Home Ground	Former League	Est.	BTFL/TFNL Seasons	Total	Years	Fate
Alexandra		Rebels	Alexandra Showgrounds, Alexandra	YVMDFL	1872	1986-1995	1	1988	Moved to Goulburn Valley FL (Div. 2) in 1996
Benalla All-Blacks		Panthers	Friendlies Oval, Benalla	B&DFL	1934	1981-1995	1	1981	Moved to Goulburn Valley FL (Div. 2) in 1996
Congupna		The Road, Roaders	Congupna Recreation Reserve, Congupna	KDFNL	1956	1962-1995	6	1963, 1964, 1971, 1978, 1991, 1993	Moved to Goulburn Valley FL (Div. 2) in 1996
Dookie United		Kangaroos	Dookie Recreation Reserve, Dookie	–	1977	1977-1995	0	-	Moved to Goulburn Valley FL (Div. 2) in 1996
Katandra		Kats	Katandra Recreation Reserve, Katandra West	CGVFL	1911	1952-1995	13	1955, 1956, 1957, 1958, 1966, 1973, 1974, 1975, 1977, 1983, 1984, 1990, 1992	Moved to Picola & District FNL in 1996
Mansfield		Demons	Mansfield Recreation Reserve, Mansfield	WNEFA	1881	1977-1995	2	1987, 1989	Moved to Goulburn Valley FL (Div. 2) in 1996
Shepparton East		Bombers	Central Park Recreation Reserve, Shepparton East	MFNL	1924	1968-1995	6	1972, 1980, 1982, 1985, 1994, 1995	Moved to Goulburn Valley FL (Div. 2) in 1996
Thornton-Eildon		Shinboners	Thornton Recreation Reserve, Thornton	B&DFL	1949	1995	0	-	Moved to Goulburn Valley FL (Div. 2) in 1996
Violet Town	(1950-77)(1992-95)	Towners	Violet Town Recreation Reserve, Violet Town	EDFA, B&DFL	1880	1950-1977, 1992-1995	2	1960, 1961	Played in Benalla & District FL between 1978-91. Moved to Goulburn Valley FL (Div. 2) in 1996

==== Former clubs ====
Club	Colours	Nickname	Home Ground	Former League	Est.	BTFL/TFNL Seasons	BTFL/TFL Senior Premierships		Fate
Club	Colours	Nickname	Home Ground	Former League	Est.	BTFL/TFNL Seasons	Total	Years	Fate
Benalla		Demons	Benalla Showgrounds, Benalla	BMFL	1871	1938-1939	1	1939	Moved to Goulburn Valley FNL in 1940
Benalla Reserves		Demons	Benalla Showgrounds, Benalla	MVNEFL	1871	1948-1952	2	1950, 1952	Moved to Ovens & Murray FL in 1953
Burramine		Cats		MVNEFL	1880s	1951-1965	2	1953, 1954	Folded in 1965
Devenish		Barbers	Devenish Recreation Reserve, Devenish	MVNEFL	1884	1938-1939, 1948-1952	0	-	Played in Murray Valley North East FL in 1946-47. Moved to Benalla & District FL in 1953
Dookie		Magpies	Dookie Recreation Reserve, Dookie	CGVFL	1887	1949-1976	2	1962, 1965	Merged with Dookie College to form Dookie United in 1977
Dookie College		Students	Dookie College	CGVFL	1946	1953-1976	1	1970	Merged with Dookie to form Dookie United in 1977
Dookie Yabba				BMFL	1932	1938-1939	0	-	Moved to Goulburn Valley FL in 1940
Invergordon	(1966)(1980s)	Hawks (formerly Royals)	Invergordon Recreation Reserve, Invergordon	–		1952, 1966-1987	0	-	Recess between 1953-65. Folded after 1987 season
Katamatite	(1950s)(?-1994)	Tigers	Katamatite Recreation Reserve, Katamatite	KFA, PDFNL	1891	1938-1939, 1956-1994	1	1979	Moved to Murray FL in 1940. Returned to Picola & District FNL in 1995
Mulwala		Lions	Lonsdale Reserve, Mulwala	MVNEFL	1882	1949-1986	3	1959, 1968, 1969	Moved to Murray FNL in 1987
North Wangaratta		Hawks	North Wangaratta Sports Reserve, North Wangaratta	OKFNL	1892	1951-1952	0	-	Moved to Benalla & District FL in 1953
St James			St James Recreation Reserve, St James	MVNEFL	1880s	1938-1939, 1948-1955	2	1948, 1949	Played in Murray Valley North East FL in 1946-47. Merged with Devenish to form St. James-Devenish United in 1956
Tungamah		Hoppers	Tungamah Recreation Reserve, Tungamah	MVNEFL	1882	1938-1939, 1948-1994	3	1938, 1976, 1986	Played in Murray Valley North East FL in 1946-47. Moved to Picola & District FNL in 1995
Wangaratta Reserves		Magpies	Norm Minns Oval, Wangaratta	OKFNL	1875	1949-1952	1	1951	Moved to Ovens & Murray FL in 1953
Wilby		Saints	Wilby Recreation Reserve, Wilby	BMFL		1951-1970	1	1967	Folded after 1970 season
Yarrawonga Rovers		Rovers				1951	0	-	Left competition

== Honour Board ==
Benalla – Tungamah Football League

- 1938 to 1966.
- Senior Football

Year	Premiers	Score	Runners Up	Score	Venue	Most Goals	Club	Comments
1938	Tungamah	11.12 – 78	Benalla 1sts	9.8 – 62	St. James			
1939	Benalla 1sts	15.16 – 106	Dookie Yabba	6.13 – 49	Devenish			Undefeated Premiers
1940–47	BTFL in recess							BTFL in recess. WW2
1948	St. James	10.8 – 68	Benalla 2nds	2.5 – 17	Devenish			
1949	St. James	10.12 – 72	Benalla 2nds	7.15 – 57	Devenish			
1950	Benalla 2nds	8.16 – 64	Dookie	8.13 – 61	?			
1951	Wangaratta 2nds	21.17 – 143	Burramine	2.3 – 15	Benalla Showgrounds	Ivan Vincent. 120	Wangaratta	
1952	Benalla 2nds	13.12 – 90	Violet Town	11.16 – 82	?			
1953	Burramine	8.21 – 69	Dookie College	8.2 – 50	Tungamah			
1954	Burramine	11.8 – 74	Dookie College	9.11 – 65	St. James	P O'Kane. 68	Burramine	
1955	Katandra	14.27 - 111	Burramine	10.9 - 69	Tungamah	N Corboy. 48	Mulwala	
1956	Katandra	12.11 – 83	Mulwala	7.7 – 49	Dookie	John Dainton. 71	Dookie	
						Dick Hammett. 71	Violet Town	
1957	Katandra	11.8 – 74	Dookie College	10.8 - 68	Tungamah			
1958	Katandra	9.9 – 63	Mulwala	6.4 – 40	Wilby			(undefeated premiers)
1959	Mulwala	12.16 – 88	Violet Town	6.10 – 46	?			
1960	Violet Town	6.12 - 48	Katandra	5.6 - 36	?			
1961	Violet Town	14.17 – 101	Mulwala	6.12 – 48	?			
1962	Dookie	10.7 - 67	Congupna	8.11 - 59	Tungamah			
1963	Congupna	10.9 – 69	Mulwala	4.11 – 35	?			
1964	Congupna	12.15 – 87	Tungamah	8.14 – 62	Katandra West	Kevin Keenan. 51	Congupna	Seniors
	Katandra	6.4 – 40	Congupna	4.3 – 27.				Seconds
1965	Dookie	11.9 – 75	Congupna	7.10 – 52	Mulwala	Tom Colbert	Dookie	?
1966	Katandra	9.5 – 59	Katamatite	6.9 – 51	Tungamah			

Tungamah Football League

- 1967 to 1995

Year	Premiers	Score	Runners Up	Score	Venue	Most Goals	Club	Comments
1967	Wilby	11.16 – 82	Congupna	7.12 – 58	Mulwala			
1968	Mulwala	13.17 – 95	Wilby	5.8 – 38	Katandra			Umpire: Bill Deller
1969	Mulwala	15.15 – 105	Dookie College	10.11 – 71				
1970	Dookie College	13.8 – 86	Katandra	11.11 – 77				
1971	Congupna	16.17 - 113	Katandra	14.12 - 96				
1972	Shepparton East	13.12 – 90	Katandra	10.13 – 73	Dookie			
1973	Katandra	22.18 - 150	Shepparton East	9.8 - 62				
1974	Katandra	11.9 – 75	Mulwala	8.12 – 60				
1975	Katandra	19.23 – 137	Congupna	10.13 - 73				
1976	Tungamah	14.21 - 105	Shepparton East	15.13 - 103	Congupna	Les Parish 89 (105)	Tungamah	
1977	Katandra	15.12 – 72	Dookie United	14.17 - 101				
1978	Congupna	15.16 - 106	Katandra	15.14 - 104		Chris Drum. 115 (126)	Congupna	
1979	Katamatite	17.11 – 113	Katandra	14.15 – 99	Dookie			
1980	Shepparton East	19.13 – 127	Katandra	13.12 – 90				
1981	Benalla All Blacks	20.11 – 131	Shepparton East	13.10 – 88				
1982	Shepparton East	18.14 – 110	Congupna	14.12 – 96				
1983	Katandra	20.18 – 136	Mansfield	14.13 – 97				
1984	Katandra	18.15 – 123	Benalla All Blacks	14.9 – 93				
1985	Shepparton East	19.10 – 124	Benalla All Blacks	11.14 – 80		B Frampton: 90	All Blacks	
1986	Tungamah	13.11 – 89	Katandra	10.13 – 73				
1987	Mansfield	18.7 – 115	Alexandra	11.15 – 81	Dookie			
1988	Alexandra	15.16 – 106	Shepparton East	10.10 – 70	Benalla			
1989	Mansfield	12.19 – 91	Katandra	8.9 – 57		W Armstrong: 59	All Blacks	
1990	Katandra	13.9 - 87	Shepparton East	10.17 - 77				
1991	Congupna	6.12 - 48	Katandra	3.16 - 34	Dookie	Phil Murray. 74 (84)	Congupna	
1992	Katandra	9.13 - 67	Mansfield	9.6 - 60	Shepparton East			
1993	Congupna	15.12 - 102	Benalla All Blacks	15.7 - 97	Shepparton East			
1994	Shepparton East	17.13 - 115	Mansfield	16.11 - 107				
1995	Shepparton East	20.10 - 130	Benalla All Blacks	12.12 - 84	Congupna			

Goulburn Valley Football League
Division Two

- 1996 to 1998

Year	Premiers	Score	Runners Up	Score	Venue	Most Goals	Club	Comments
1996	Mansfield	21.20 - 146	Shepparton East	2.16 - 28		Guy Manigan. 101 (117)	Congupna	
1997	Alexandra	20.13 – 133	Mansfield	19.12 – 126	Dookie			
1998	Rumbalara	21.18 – 124	Alexandra	14.10 – 94				GVFL – Div 2, changed to CGFL

Central Goulburn Football League

- 1999 to 2005

Year	Premiers	Score	Runners Up	Score	Venue	Most Goals	Club	Comments
1999	Rumbalara	16.11 – 107	Shepparton East	11.12 – 78				
2000	Alexandra	12.9 – 81	Yea	8.14 – 62	Dookie			
2001	Shepparton East	19.12 – 126	Yea	10.10 – 70				
2002	Rumbalara	17.9 – 111	Yea	16.9 – 105				
2003	Yea	27.15 - 177	Violet Town	9.9 - 63				
2004	Shepparton East	17.10 - 112	Rumbalara	16.10 - 106				
2005	Yea	9.12 – 66	Rumbalara	8.9 – 57		B.Firebrace: 62	Rumbalara	

() - Brackets includes goals kicked in finals.

Tungamah Football League

- Reserves Grand Finals

Year	Premiers	Score	Runners Up	Score	Comments
1956	Dookie	6.11 - 47	Dookie College	5.9 - 39	
1964	Katandra	6.4 - 28	Congupna Road	4.3 - 27	
1965	Congupna Road	10.12 - 72	Mulwala	2.13 - 25	
1966	Congupna Road	6.11 - 47	Katandra	5.1 - 31	
1967	Congupna Road	8.13 - 61	Dookie College	8.1 - 49	
1968	Mulwala	3.12 - 30	Katandra	3.8 - 26	
1969					
1970	Dookie College	16.12 - 108	Mulwala	6.7 - 43	
1971					
1972	Shepparton East	12.? - ?	Congupna	11.10 - 76	
1979	Congupna	12.9 - 81	Shepparton East	9.9 - 63	
1980	Shepparton East	14.14 - 98	Benalla All Blacks	9.9 - 63	
1981	Benalla All Blacks	12.18 - 90	Mansfield	11.18 - 84	
1982	Mansfield	13.14 - 92	Dookie United	9.9 - 63	
1983	Mansfield	14.9 - 93	Shepparton East	14.9 - 93	Drawn G Final
1983					G Final Replay
1984	Katandra	9.6 - 60	Benalla All Blacks	8.12 - 60	Drawn G Final
1984					G Final Replay
1985	Benalla All Blacks	12.11 - 83	Mansfield	7.5 - 47	
1986	Shepparton East	9.8 - 62	Katandra	7.7 - 49	

Tungamah Football League

- Thirds / Under 17's Grand Finals

Year	Premiers	Score	Runners Up	Score	Comments
1968	Congupna Road	8.3 - 51	Mulwala	7.7 - 49	
1969					
1970	Katandra	8.9 - 57	Mulwala	5.4 - 34	
1971					
1972	Mulwala	8.12 - 60	Dookie	7.9 - 51	
1979	Mansfield	10.6 - 66	Benalla All Blacks	7.8 - 50	
1980					
1981	Mansfield	9.6 - 60	Katamatite	8.6 - 54	
1982	Katamatite	11.10 - 76	Mansfield	7.5 - 47	
1983	Katandra	8.14 - 62	Mulwala	5.8 - 38	
1984	Benalla All Blacks	7.4 - 46	Katandra	4.4 - 28	
1985					
1986	Benalla All Blacks	18.12 - 120	Shepparton East	6.3 - 39	
1995	Benalla All Blacks				

Tungamah Football League

- Fourths / Under 12's Grand Finals

Year	Premiers	Score	Runners Up	Score	Comments
1970	Katandra	defeated	Katamatite		
1979	Shepparton East	2.0 - 12	Mansfield	1.0 - 6	
1980					
1981					
1982	Benalla All Blacks				
1983	Benalla All Blacks				
1984					
1985	Benalla All Blacks				
1986	Katamatite	3.1 - 19	Katandra		
1987					
1988					
1989					
1990					
1991	Congupna		Mansfield		
1992	Congupna		Mansfield		
1993	Katandra		Mansfield		
1994	Shepparton East		Katandra		
1995	Katandra		Congupna		

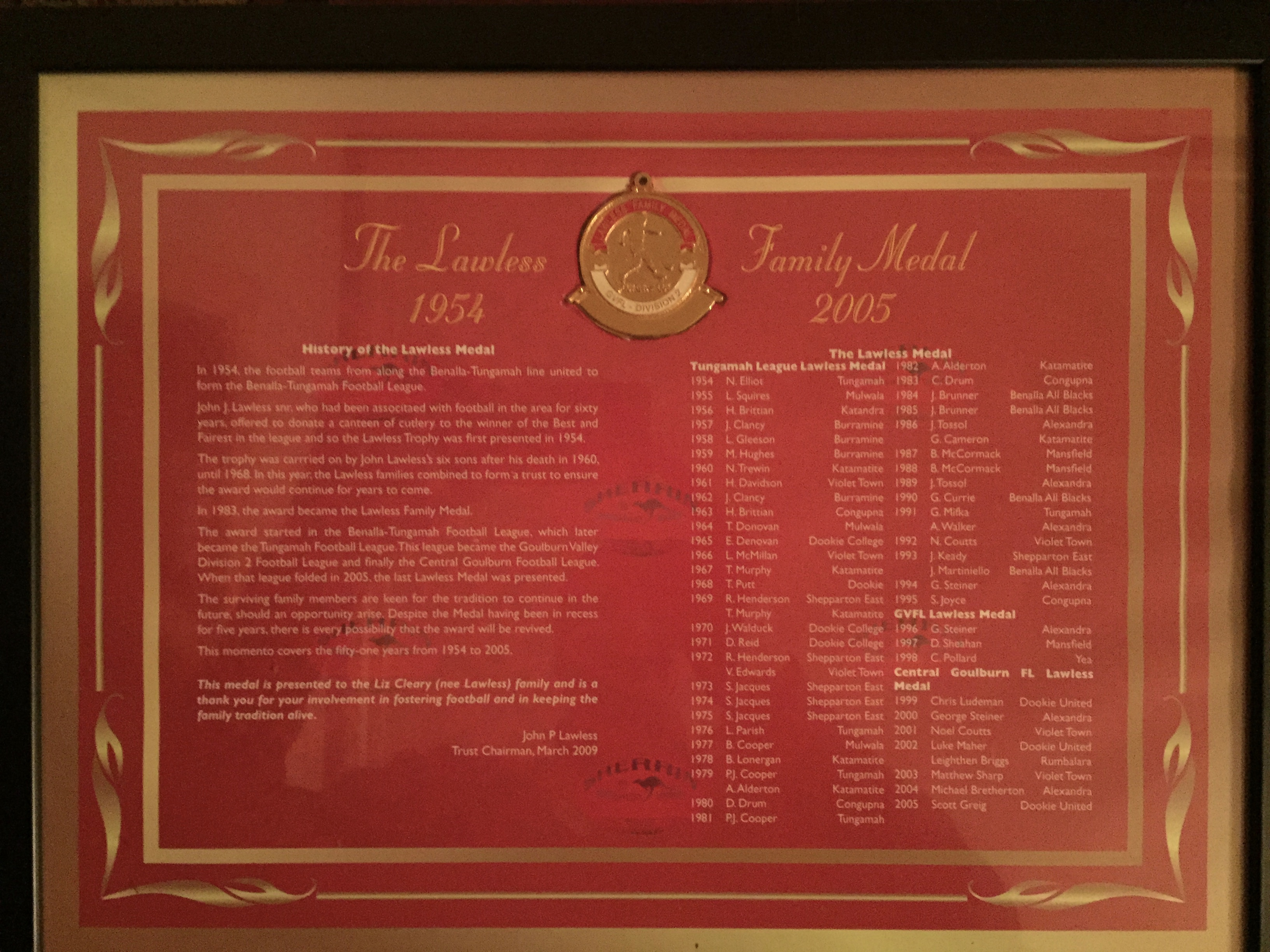

== Senior Football Best & Fairest Awards ==
Benalla Tungamah Football League

- 1938 to 1966
- The Lawless Family Medal

The Lawless Family Medal for the BTFL senior football best and fairest award was first donated in 1954, by John J. Lawless – Senior, with the winner receiving a canteen of cutlery.

Year	Winner	Club	Votes	Runners Up	Club	Votes	Comments
1954	N Elliott	Tungamah	28	Harry Brittain &	Katandra	22	
				Les Squires	Mulwala	21	
1955	Les Squires	Mulwala	21	R Hood	Dookie College	20	
1956	Harry Brittain	Katandra	34	Gordon Willett	Wilby	25	
1957	Malcom Hughes	Burramine	32	G Webb	Dookie	23	
1958	Laurie Gleeson	Burramine	28	R Beames &	Mulwala	22	
				G Willett	Wilby	22	
1959	John Clancy	Burramine	28	G Willett	Wilby	21	
1960	N Trewin	Katamatite					
1961	H Davidson	Violet Town					
1962	Jim Clancy	Burramine	21	Arthur Howell	Wilby	20	
1963	Harry Brittain	Congupna	24	W Willett &	Wilby	21	
				Trevor Donovan	Mulwala	21	
1964	Trevor Donovan	Mulwala					
1965	E Denovan	Dookie College	19	William Saunders	Tungamah	15	
1966	Lance McMillan	Violet Town	20&1/2	Tony Murphy	Katamatite	19	

Tungamah Football League

- 1967 to 1995
- The Lawless Family Medal

Year	Winner	Club	Votes	Runners Up	Club	Votes	Comments
1967	Tony Murphy	Katamatite	19	Terry Putt	Dookie	16	
1968	Terry Putt	Dookie					
1969	Ray Henderson &	Shepparton East					
	T Murphy	Katamatite					
1970	J Walduck	Dookie College					
1971	D Read	Dookie College					
1972	V Edwards &	Violet Town					
	Ray Henderson	Shepparton East					
1973	Stan Jacques	Shepparton East		Laurie Flanigan	Katamatitie		
1974	Stan Jacques	Shepparton East					
1975	Stan Jacques	Shepparton East					
1976	Les Parish	Tungamah	26	Ross McKellar	Dookie	22	
1977	B Cooper	Mulwala					
1978	Bernie Lonergan	Katamatite					
1979	P J Cooper &	Tungamah					
	Andy Alterton	Katamatite					
1980	Damian Drum	Congupna					
1981	P J Cooper	Tungamah					
1982	Andy Alterton	Katamatite					
1983	Chris Drum	Congupna	22	Trevor Kennedy	Congupna	18	
1984	John Brunner	Benalla All Blacks					
1985	John Brunner	Benalla All Blacks					
1986	Gary Cameron &	Katamatite					
	John Tossol	Alexandra					
1987	Bruce McCormack	Mansfield					
1988	Bruce McCormack	Mansfield					
1989	John Tossol	Alexandra					
1990	G Currie	Benalla All Blacks					
1991	G Mifka &	Tungamah					
	Andrew Walker	Alexandra					
1992	Noel Coutts	Violet Town					
1993	John Keady &	Shepparton East					
	John Martinello	Benalla All Blacks					
1994	George Steiner	Alexandra					
1995	S Joyce	Congupna					

Goulburn Valley Football League – Division Two

- 1996 to 1998
- The Lawless Family Medal

Year	Winner	Club	Votes	Runners Up	Club	Votes	Comments
1996	George Steiner	Alexandra					
1997	Denis Sheahan	Mansfield					
1998	Chris Pollard	Yea					

Central Goulburn Football League

- 1999 to 2005
- The Lawless Family Medal

Year	Winner	Club	Votes	Runners Up	Club	Votes	Comments
1999	Chris Ludeman	Dookie United					
2000	George Steiner	Alexandra					
2001	Noel Coutts	Violet Town					
2002	Leighthen Briggs &	Rumbalara					
	Luke Maher	Dookie United					
2003	Matthew Sharp	Violet Town					
2004	Michael Bretherton	Alexandra					
2005	Scott Greig	Dookie United					
