= Les Parish =

Australian rules footballer

Personal information
- Full name: Leslie Parish
- Born: 28 September 1955
- Died: 12 February 1998 (aged 42); Cobram, Victoria
- Original teams: Mulwala, Tungamah, Yarrawonga
- Height: 180 cm (5 ft 11 in)
- Weight: 82 kg (181 lb)
- Positions: Ruck-rover, utility

Playing career^{1}
Years	Club	Games (Goals)
1972	Mulwala	? (?)
1973-75, 1977-79, 1986-88	Yarrawonga	164 (332)
1976	Tungamah	? (105)
1980-85	Fitzroy	87 (52)
1985	Melbourne	7 (5)
1989-91	Griffith	48 (106)
1992-95	Cobram	? (?)
Total		94 (57)
- ^{1} Playing statistics correct to the end of 1995.

Career highlights
- 1973: Yarrawonga FC Reserves Premiership; 1976: Tungamah FL Seniors best & fairest medal; 1976: Tungamah FC Seniors best & fairest; 1976: Tungamah FC Seniors Premiership; 1976: Tungamah FL Leading goalkicker - 105 goals; 1977, 78, 79, 86, 87: Yarrawonga FC best & fairest; 1983: Victorian FL squad; 1987: Ovens & Murray FL Morris Medal; 1989: Riverina FL Jim Quinn Medal; 1993 & 94: Cobram FC best & fairest; 1995: Cobram FL Seniors Premiership; Representative matches for Tungamah FL, O&MFNL, VFL, Riverina FL & Murray FL; 2017: Ovens & Murray FL Hall of Fame Inductee

Les "Salty" Parish (28 September 1955 – 12 February 1998) was an Australian rules footballer who played with Fitzroy and Melbourne in the Victorian Football League (VFL).

Parish originally played senior football with Mulwala as a 14 year old, then played with Yarrawonga as a 17 year old in 1973, then played with Tungamah in the Tungamah Football League, where he won the league's 1976 best and fairest award, the Lawless Medal, won the goal kicking award, with 105 goals and was a member of Tungamah’s premiership team, kicking four goals in the grand final.

Parish originally trialled at North Melbourne in late 1976, playing two reserves matches before he returned to the Ovens and Murray Football League and played with Yarrawonga in 1977, winning their club best and fairest in 1977, 1978 and 1979, before being signed by Fitzroy Football Club in 1980.

A ruck-rover and utility, he gave Fitzroy good service over six seasons. He kicked 21 goals in 1981, two of them in an elimination final win over Essendon. Parish also played finals football in 1983, when he did not miss a game all year, and again in 1984. He was Fitzroy's third best vote getter at the 1982 Brownlow Medal count, with eight votes and equal second in 1983, with eight votes.

Parish made the 1983 Victorian Representative squad for their match against Western Australia in July 1983.

He finished his VFL career at Melbourne, after being transferred to Melbourne during the 1985 season due to salary cap restrictions and made his debut for Melbourne in round 13, June 1985 against Hawthorn.

Known for some tattoos on his biceps, he returned to playing at Yarrawonga in the Ovens & Murray Football League in 1986 upon leaving Melbourne and won Yarrawonga's best and fairest in 1986 and 1987. Parish won the Ovens & Murray Football League's best and fairest award, the Morris Medal in 1986.

Parish coached Griffith Football Club from 1989 to 1991. He won the Riverina Football League’s best and fairest award, the Jim Quinn Medal in 1989 and they were runners up in 1991.

Parish then played with Cobram Football Club from 1992 to 1995, including their 1995 Murray Football League premiership. He also won their best and fairest award in 1993 and 1994.

Parish retired at the conclusion of the 1995 season, with a tally of 400 plus senior matches played.

He died of cancer in 1998.

Parish was inducted into the O&MFNL Hall of Fame in 2017.

== Links ==
- "Les Parish". AFL Tables.
- 1976 Tiungamah FL Premiers: Tungamah FC team photo
- 1983 action photo of Les Parish
- Les Parish: Griffith FC player profile via Swans on Screen
- O&MFNL - Hall of Fame Inductees
