= Caleb Mitchell =

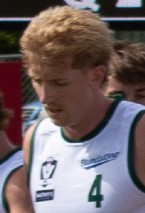
- Mitchell playing for Tasmania in 2026

Personal information
- Born: 10 August 2004 (age 22)
- Original teams: Mulwala, Yarrawonga, Murray Bushrangers
- Draft: No. 40, 2022 AFL draft
- Debut: 31 March 2024, Sydney vs. Richmond, at MCG
- Height: 186 cm (6 ft 1 in)
- Weight: 81 kg (179 lb)

Club information
- Current club: Tasmania
- Number: 4

Playing career^{1}
Years	Club	Games (Goals)
2023-2025	Sydney	3 (0)
2026-	Tasmania	
- ^{1} Playing statistics correct to the end of the 2025 season.

Caleb Mitchell is an Australian rules footballer who plays for the Tasmania Football Club in the Victorian Football League (VFL). He previously played professionally for the Sydney Swans in the Australian Football League (AFL).

Mitchell played for Mulwala Thirds in 2021, winning the Murray Football League best and fairest award.

in 2022, Mitchell then played for the Murray Bushrangers and Yarrawonga and was selected for Vic Country in the National Championships. He played in Yarrawonga's losing 2022 Ovens & Murray Football League grand final loss to Wangaratta.

He was subsequently taken by Sydney with pick 40 of the 2022 National Draft.

In 2024, his second season at the club, Mitchell made his debut against Richmond in round 3.

Mitchell played 3 matches for the Swans over 3 seasons, before being delisted at the end of the 2025 AFL season.

== Statistics ==
Updated to the end of the 2025 season.

Legend
G	Goals	K	Kicks	D	Disposals	T	Tackles
B	Behinds	H	Handballs	M	Marks

Season	Team	No.	Games	Totals							Averages (per game)							Votes
Season	Team	No.	Games	G	B	K	H	D	M	T	G	B	K	H	D	M	T	Votes
2024	Sydney	35	2	0	0	7	3	10	3	0	0.0	0.0	3.5	1.5	5.0	1.5	0.0	0
2025	Sydney	35	1	0	0	8	5	13	4	2	0.0	0.0	8.0	5.0	13.0	4.0	2.0	0
Career			3	0	0	15	8	23	7	2	0.0	0.0	5.0	2.7	7.7	2.3	0.7	0
