= Merv Scanlan =

Australian rules footballer

Personal information
- Full name: Mervan Scanlan
- Born: 8 December 1902; Cobden, Victoria
- Died: 16 November 1941 (aged 38); South Melbourne, Victoria
- Original team: South Districts

Playing career^{1}
Years	Club	Games (Goals)
1924	South Melbourne	2 (0)
- ^{1} Playing statistics correct to the end of 1924.

Mervan Scanlan (8 December 1902 – 16 November 1941) was an Australian rules footballer who played with South Melbourne in the Victorian Football League (VFL).

Scanlan was appointed as coach of the Tungamah Football Club in 1925.

Scanlan died after falling from a bus in South Melbourne on 16 November 1941.
