= John McLeish =

Australian rules footballer

Personal information
- Full name: John D. M. McLeish
- Born: 19 December 1926
- Died: 10 December 2005 (aged 78)
- Original teams: Yea, Dookie College
- Height: 178 cm (5 ft 10 in)
- Weight: 79 kg (174 lb)
- Position: Half-back flank

Playing career^{1}
Years	Club	Games (Goals)
1949–50	Essendon	10 (0)
- ^{1} Playing statistics correct to the end of 1950.

John McLeish (19 December 1926 – 10 December 2005) was an Australian rules footballer who played with Essendon in the Victorian Football League (VFL). McLeish's father, Maurie, played VFL football for St Kilda.

After a season and a half with Essendon, McLeish returned to the team he was recruited from, Yea, where he was appointed captain-coach. They won the 1950 Waranga North East Football Association premiership in his first season in the role. McLeish continued to play with Yea until 1954.

McLeish won the 1945 Goulburn Valley Football Association best and fairest / Shepparton Advertiser Trophy, when playing for Dookie College.
