= Charles Priestley =

Charles Priestley may refer to:

- Charlie Priestley (1916–1992), Australian rules footballer
- Charles Priestley (meteorologist) (1915–1998), British meteorologist
