= Bill Lumsden =

Australian rules footballer

Personal information
- Full name: James William Lumsden
- Born: 24 December 1924; Armadale, Victoria
- Died: 7 September 1988 (aged 63); Heathmont, Victoria
- Original team: Katamatite
- Height: 169 cm (5 ft 7 in)
- Weight: 67 kg (148 lb)

Playing career^{1}
| Years | Club | Games (Goals) |
| 1948–49 | St Kilda | 11 (0) |
- ^{1} Playing statistics correct to the end of 1949.

James William Lumsden (24 December 1924 – 7 September 1988) was an Australian rules footballer who played with St Kilda in the Victorian Football League (VFL).

Lumsden was recruited to St. Kilda from Katamatite Football Club after he won the 1947 - O'Dwyer Medal in the Murray Football League.

He also served in the RAAF in World War II.
