= Xavier O'Halloran =

Australian rules footballer

Personal information
- Full name: Xavier O'Halloran
- Born: 11 July 2000 (age 26); Essendon, Victoria
- Original team: Western Jets (TAC Cup)
- Draft: No. 22, 2018 national draft, Greater Western Sydney
- Height: 186 cm (6 ft 1 in)
- Weight: 87 kg (192 lb)
- Position: Midfielder

Club information
- Current club: Greater Western Sydney
- Number: 33

Playing career^{1}
Years	Club	Games (Goals)
2019–	Greater Western Sydney	103 (37)
- ^{1} Playing statistics correct to the end of round 22, 2026.

Xavier O'Halloran (born 11 July 2000) is an Australian rules footballer who plays for the Greater Western Sydney Giants in the Australian Football League (AFL). He was recruited by the Greater Western Sydney Giants with the 22nd draft pick in the 2018 AFL draft. O'Halloran's grandfather was Footscray Bulldogs 1954 premiership player Ron McCarthy.

== Early football ==
O'Halloran played school football for his team at St. Bernard's College in Melbourne, where he won the Herald Sun Shield and the Neale Daniher Award. He also captained the Western Jets in the NAB League for the 2018 season, while playing for them in the 2017 and 2018 seasons, where he picked up a total of 31 goals. O'Halloran also represented and captained Vic Metro in the AFL Under 18 Championships for the 2018 season.

== AFL career ==
O'Halloran debuted in the Giants' four point win against the Essendon Bombers in the tenth round of the 2020 AFL season. O'Halloran picked up 9 disposals, 3 tackles and a clearance.

== Statistics ==
Updated to the end of round 22, 2026.

Legend
G	Goals	K	Kicks	D	Disposals	T	Tackles
B	Behinds	H	Handballs	M	Marks

Season	Team	No.	Games	Totals							Averages (per game)							Votes
Season	Team	No.	Games	G	B	K	H	D	M	T	G	B	K	H	D	M	T	Votes
2019	Greater Western Sydney	33	0	—	—	—	—	—	—	—	—	—	—	—	—	—	—	0
2020 (Note: The 2020 season was played with 17 home-and-away matches per team (down from 22) and 16-minute quarters with time on (down from 20-minute quarters with time on) due to the impact of the COVID-19 pandemic.)	Greater Western Sydney	33	2	0	0	9	10	19	2	6	0.0	0.0	4.5	5.0	9.5	1.0	3.0	0
2021	Greater Western Sydney	33	17	5	3	124	56	180	42	22	0.3	0.2	7.3	3.3	10.6	2.5	1.3	0
2022	Greater Western Sydney	33	14	1	3	88	55	143	35	24	0.1	0.2	6.3	3.9	10.2	2.5	1.7	0
2023	Greater Western Sydney	33	15	11	8	103	83	186	31	43	0.7	0.5	6.9	5.5	12.4	2.1	2.9	0
2024	Greater Western Sydney	33	19	8	7	129	83	212	41	51	0.4	0.4	6.8	4.4	11.2	2.2	2.7	0
2025	Greater Western Sydney	33	23	9	10	199	146	345	53	66	0.4	0.4	8.7	6.3	15.0	2.3	2.9	2
2026	Greater Western Sydney	33	13	3	8	111	103	214	31	34	0.2	0.6	8.5	7.9	16.5	2.4	2.6	0
Career			103	37	39	763	536	1299	235	246	0.4	0.4	7.4	5.2	12.6	2.3	2.4	2
