= Tom Clurey =

Australian rules footballer

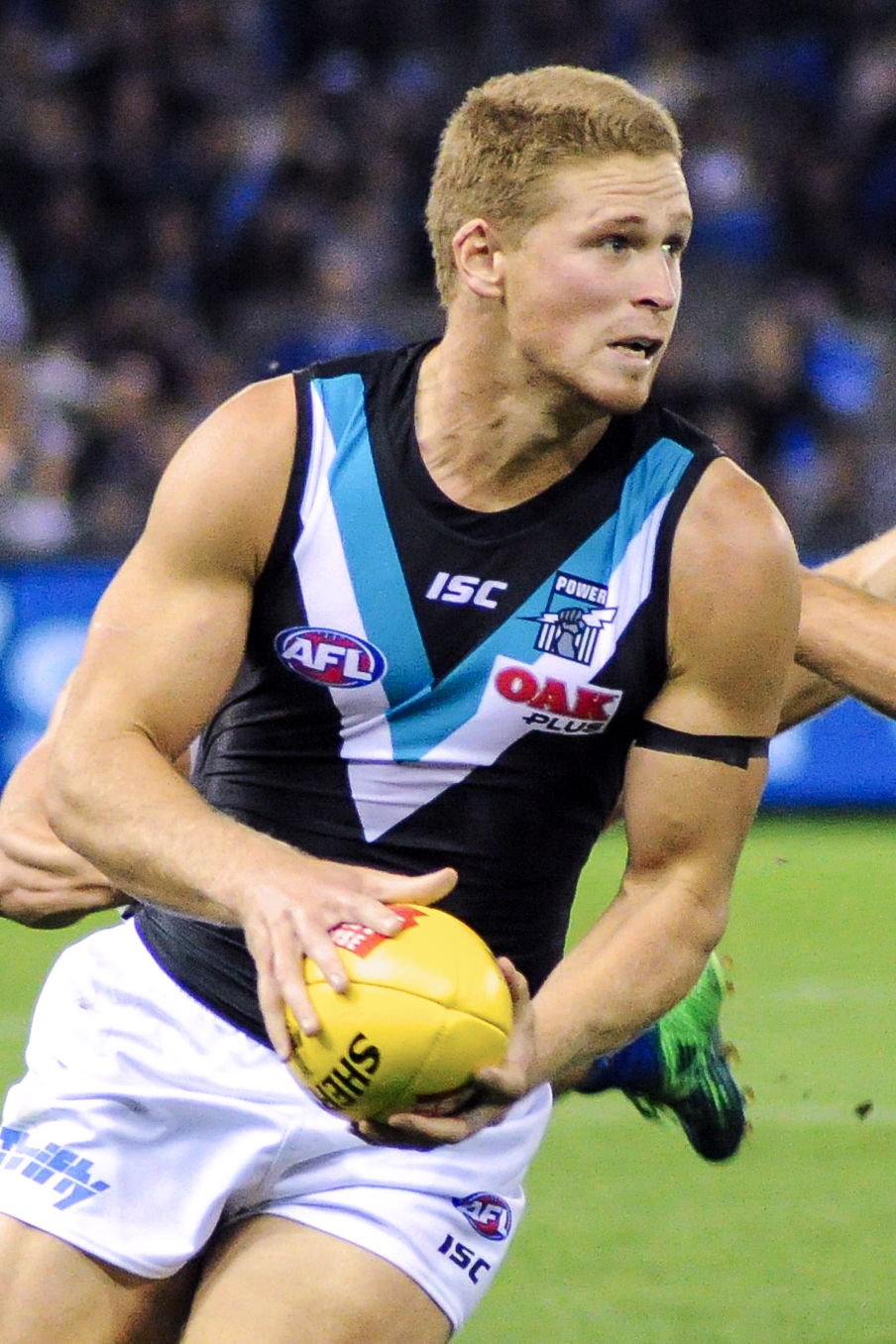
- Clurey playing for Port Adelaide in June 2018

Personal information
- Born: 23 March 1994 (age 32)
- Original teams: Murray Bushrangers (TAC Cup); Katamatite Tigers
- Draft: No. 29, 2011 national draft
- Debut: Round 1, 2013, Essendon vs. Carlton, at Docklands Stadium
- Height: 193 cm (6 ft 4 in)
- Weight: 88 kg (194 lb)
- Position: Defender

Club information
- Current club: Port Adelaide
- Number: 17

Playing career^{1}
Years	Club	Games (Goals)
2013–2024	Port Adelaide	124 (0)
- ^{1} Playing statistics correct to the end of 2024.

Tom Clurey (born 23 March 1994) is a professional Australian rules footballer who played for the Port Adelaide Football Club in the Australian Football League (AFL). He was drafted by Port Adelaide with the 29th selection in the Australian Football League's (AFL) 2012 National Draft from Murray Bushrangers in the TAC Cup.

== Early life ==
Clurey is a tall defender that is known for his endurance, this was shown in the NAB AFL combine where he recorded a beep test result of 15.1, which set him apart from all other tall defenders at the camp. He played for youth development team Murray Bushrangers in the Talent League in his draft year. Originally from a sheep and canola farm in the township of Invergordon, near Shepparton, he was drafted by Port Adelaide during the second round of 2012 national draft with pick 29. During the conclusion of the round 1 selection

== AFL career ==
Spending 2013 developing in the SANFL with Glenelg, Clurey made his AFL debut for the Power in round 1, 2014, against Carlton. It would be the only game he would play for the year.

Clurey took a developmental step forward in 2015, playing 8 games at AFL level and improving his consistency in the SANFL. He broke through mid year to play 8 out of 10 games, covering for injuries to Alipate Carlile and Jackson Trengove. He predominantly played on the second or third tall and beat the likes of Jesse White, Patrick Ambrose, Stewart Crameri and Jeremy Howe during the year. Impressive with the ball, he became a safe user coming out of the backline, where his intercept marking and 3rd up spoiling was also a feature.

In 2017, Clurey played a career-best 23 games and featured in his first finals game, which was a loss to West Coast. Despite the loss, Clurey was praised by coach Ken Hinkley for his role on tall forward Josh Kennedy, who scored the second most goals of the year. In 2019, The Adelaide Advertiser called Clurey "the best defender in the AFL" as he took his game to a new level.

Mid-way through the 2021 season, Clurey required surgery for his broken jaw. The injury occurred in a head clash with Western Bulldog Mitch Hannan. As he became an important member of the Power's backline, Clurey signed a contract extension in 2022, keeping him at the club until the end of 2025, despite already being contracted until the end of 2023. Despite this, Clurey was reported to be open to a move during 2023, and was let go by the Power after not featuring in the 2024 AFL season.
