= Michael Howard (Australian footballer) =

Australian rules footballer

Personal information
- Full name: Michael Howard
- Born: 8 March 1965 (age 61)
- Original team: Katamatite
- Height: 170 cm (5 ft 7 in)
- Weight: 67 kg (148 lb)

Playing career^{1}
Years	Club	Games (Goals)
1984	Melbourne	2 (0)
- ^{1} Playing statistics correct to the end of 1984.

Michael Howard (born 8 March 1965) is a former Australian rules footballer who played with Melbourne in the Victorian Football League (VFL).
