= Jack Cooper (Australian rules footballer, born 1911) =

Australian rules footballer

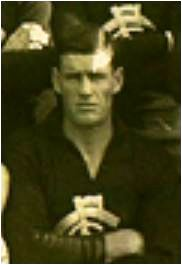
- Cooper in 1934

Personal information
- Full name: John Merton Cooper
- Born: 12 August 1911
- Died: 7 February 1996 (aged 65)
- Original team: Tungamah
- Height: 188 cm (6 ft 2 in)
- Weight: 79 kg (174 lb)
- Positions: Centre half-forward, centre half-back

Playing career^{1}
| Years | Club | Games (Goals) |
| 1933–1935 | Carlton | 15 (29) |
- ^{1} Playing statistics correct to the end of 1935.

Jack Cooper (12 August 1911 – 7 February 1996) was an Australian rules footballer who played with Carlton in the Victorian Football League (VFL). He later played for Brunswick in the Victorian Football Association (VFA).
