= Wilfred Fell =

Australian rules footballer

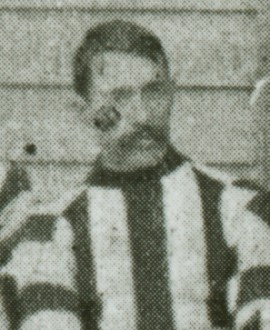
- Fell in 1899

Personal information
- Full name: Wilfred George Fell
- Born: 15 April 1879; Gisborne, Victoria
- Died: 11 April 1920 (aged 40); East Melbourne, Victoria
- Original team: Tungamah
- Height: 182 cm (6 ft 0 in)
- Weight: 81 kg (179 lb)

Playing career^{1}
Years	Club	Games (Goals)
1899	Collingwood	7 (0)
- ^{1} Playing statistics correct to the end of 1899.

Wilfred George Fell (15 April 1879 – 11 April 1920) was an Australian rules footballer who played with Collingwood in the Victorian Football League (VFL).

Originally from Tungamah Football Club, Fell made his senior VFL debut in the 1899 VFL season, playing seven games for Collingwood before leaving the club at the end of the season.
