= Ray Gillett =

Australian rules footballer

Personal information
- Full name: Ray Gillett
- Born: 2 February 1917
- Died: 31 August 1995 (aged 78)
- Original teams: Thornton, South Caulfield
- Height: 182 cm (6 ft 0 in)
- Weight: 70 kg (154 lb)
- Position: Defender

Playing career^{1}
Years	Club	Games (Goals)
1937, 1939	South Melbourne	8 (0)
- ^{1} Playing statistics correct to the end of 1939.

Ray Gillett (2 February 1917 – 31 August 1995) was an Australian rules footballer who played with South Melbourne in the Victorian Football League (VFL).

Gillett was a left foot kick, who originally played with Thornton, then with South Caulfield in 1936, prior to playing with South Melbourne.
