= Ron McCarthy =

Australian rules footballer (1934–1989)

Personal information
- Born: 3 November 1934
- Died: 20 January 1989 (aged 54)
- Original team: Seddon
- Height: 180 cm (5 ft 11 in)
- Weight: 76 kg (168 lb)

Playing career^{1}
Years	Club	Games (Goals)
1953–1956	Footscray	42 (3)
- ^{1} Playing statistics correct to the end of 1956.

Career highlights
- VFL premiership player: 1954

Ron McCarthy (3 November 1934 – 20 January 1989) was an Australian rules footballer who played with Footscray in the Victorian Football League (VFL) during the 1950s and part of Footscray Bulldogs first VFL premiership in 1954.

McCarthy was appointed as captain-coach of Thorton-Eildon in 1957 in the Waranga North East Football Association, where they lost the 1958 grand final to Euroa.

His grandson Xavier O'Halloran was drafted to Greater Western Sydney at pick number 22 in 2018 AFL draft.
