= Peter Ryan (footballer, born 1891) =

Australian rules footballer (1891–1982)

Personal information
- Full name: Peter John Ryan
- Born: 5 September 1891; Dookie, Victoria
- Died: 8 April 1982 (aged 90); Shepparton, Victoria
- Original team: Dookie
- Height: 177 cm (5 ft 10 in)
- Weight: 78 kg (172 lb)

Playing career^{1}
| Years | Club | Games (Goals) |
| 1919 | St Kilda | 7 (3) |
- ^{1} Playing statistics correct to the end of 1919.

Peter John Ryan (5 September 1891 – 8 April 1982) was an Australian rules footballer who played with St Kilda in the Victorian Football League (VFL).
