= Kevin Bond (Australian footballer) =

Australian rules footballer (1928–1991)

Personal information
- Full name: Kevin Bond
- Born: 26 May 1928
- Died: 8 October 1991 (aged 63)
- Original teams: Tungamah, Benalla
- Height: 165 cm (5 ft 5 in)
- Weight: 67 kg (148 lb)

Playing career^{1}
Years	Club	Games (Goals)
1952	Hawthorn	1 (0)
- ^{1} Playing statistics correct to the end of 1952.

Kevin Bond (26 May 1928 – 8 October 1991) was an Australian rules footballer who played with Hawthorn in the Victorian Football League (VFL).

Bond played 74 senior games with Benalla Football Club in the Ovens and Murray Football League prior to playing with Hawthorn.
