= Peter Tossol =

Australian rules footballer

Personal information
- Full name: Peter Anthony Tossol
- Born: 21 November 1962 (age 63); Eildon, Victoria
- Original team: Thornton-Eildon
- Height: 183 cm (6 ft 0 in)
- Weight: 80 kg (176 lb)

Playing career^{1}
Years	Club	Games (Goals)
1982–1984	Melbourne	17 (20)
- ^{1} Playing statistics correct to the end of 1984.

Peter Anthony Tossol (born 21 November 1962) is a former Australian rules footballer who played with Melbourne in the Victorian Football League (VFL). He was also a Victorian Country representative in cricket.

== Melbourne career ==
Tossol, a forward, came to Melbourne from Thornton-Eildon. Tossol kicked goals with his first two kicks in league football, on debut against Richmond in 1982. A former Assumption College captain, Tossol made only five senior appearances that season, but did well in the reserves, finishing at the club's leading goal-kicker. After appearing just twice in the VFL in 1983, Tossol played 10 league games in the 1984 season. His 14 goals in 1984 included four against reigning premiers Hawthorn at the Melbourne Cricket Ground. He was a member of Melbourne's 1984 reserves premiership team.

== Ovens & Murray Football League ==
Tossol played 229 games in the Ovens & Murray Football League, 211 of them for the Wangaratta Rovers. He was part of three premierships with the Wangaratta Rovers, in 1991 and 1993 and 1994. His other 18 games were with Corowa-Rutherglen, which he coached from 1999 to 2003, then again from 2008 to 2010. This included premierships in 2000 and 2003. He is an inductee in the Ovens & Murray Football League Hall of Fame and is coach of the Corowa-Rutherglen Team of the Century.

Tossol coached Wangaratta Rovers in 2004, then coached Mansfield in the Goulburn Valley Football League from 2005 to 2007.

== Personal life ==
Elder brother, John, played two games for Melbourne, both in 1981.
