= Marc Bullen =

Australian rules footballer (born 1982)

Personal information
- Full name: Marc Bullen
- Born: 12 July 1982 (age 44)
- Original team: Congupna Football Club (Murray Football League) Murray Bushrangers (TAC Cup)
- Height: 187 cm (6 ft 2 in)
- Weight: 85 kg (187 lb)

Playing career^{1}
Years	Club	Games (Goals)
2001–2005	Essendon	44 (9)
- ^{1} Playing statistics correct to the end of 2005.

Marcus Bullen (born 12 July 1982) is a former Australian rules footballer in the Australian Football League for the Essendon Football Club.

Recruited from Congupna Football Club and the Murray Bushrangers, Bullen was selected with the 63rd pick in the 2000 AFL draft. In the 5 seasons he played for the Bombers, he never cemented his position. During the 2003 and '04 seasons the young defender/midfielder had patches of good form, playing 16 & 17 games respectively of the 22 standard season games, including an AFL Rising Star nomination in 2003. However 2005 was a brown patch for him in his short career and he only managed 7 games for the season. Despite rumours of trade interest from Port Adelaide, at the end of the season he was subsequently delisted.

After his delisting from Essendon, Bullen moved to Adelaide in 2006 and signed on for the Port Adelaide Magpies in the SANFL where his appearances were restricted due to injury.

In 2007, he switched to the Silvan Football Club in the Yarra Valley Mountain District Football League. Winning the premiership in his first year with Silvan, Bullen also tied the clubs B&F with ex Essendon great Gary Moorcroft. In 2008, Silvan went through the season undefeated, with Bullen awarded Best on Ground in the Cats triumphant back to back premiership. Bullen moved to Maribyrnong Park in 2009 playing in the Essendon District Football League. Bullen went on to play in premierships in 2009-10 with the Lions. In 2013, Bullen took the senior coaching reins at Deer Park in the WRFL. Bullen a playing coach at Deer Park until retiring from playing in 2016, has coached the club for seven consecutive years, winning a record 7 senior premierships in a row! Including a 3 point triumph over the more fancied Altona in 2019. With 11 premierships to its name, Deer Park is fast closing in on league leader Spotswood’s 15 flags. Bullen has been appointed senior coach at Deer Park for 2020.

Bullen also works at Hardwicks Meatworks which is an abattoir in Kyneton, Victoria.
