= Joe Bourke =

Australian rules footballer

Personal information
- Full name: James Joseph Bourke
- Born: 8 November 1884; Yarrawonga, Victoria
- Died: 28 August 1932 (aged 47); Greensborough, Victoria
- Original team: Tungamah
- Height: 175 cm (5 ft 9 in)
- Weight: 67 kg (148 lb)

Playing career^{1}
Years	Club	Games (Goals)
1909	Richmond	2 (1)
- ^{1} Playing statistics correct to the end of 1909.

Joe Bourke (8 November 1884 – 28 August 1932) was a former Australian rules footballer who played with Richmond in the Victorian Football League (VFL).
