= Jack Kidd (Australian footballer) =

Australian rules footballer, born 1908

Personal information
- Full name: John William Kidd
- Born: 10 February 1908; Carlton, Victoria
- Died: 26 March 1960 (aged 52); Parkville, Victoria
- Original teams: Moonee Ponds West State School, Essendon Reserves, Tungamah
- Height: 183 cm (6 ft 0 in)
- Weight: 79 kg (174 lb)

Playing career^{1}
Years	Club	Games (Goals)
1924–30	Essendon	42 (12)
1931	Carlton	2 (0)
1933	Fitzroy	1 (2)
Total		45 (14)
- ^{1} Playing statistics correct to the end of 1933.

Jack Kidd (10 February 1908 – 26 March 1960) was an Australian rules footballer who played with Essendon, Carlton and Fitzroy in the Victorian Football League (VFL).

Kidd was a member of the Moonee Ponds State School teams that won the State Schools Football Championships in 1921 and was best on ground for the Moonee Ponds State School in the 1922 Victorian State Schools Football Championships grand final

Kidd also starred for the Moonee Ponds State School cricket team that won the 1922 State Schools Cricket Championships by making 98 and taking 6/18 in the grand final!

Kidd played VFL Reserves football with Essendon in 1924 and 1925, before making his senior football debut with Essendon in 1926, against North Melbourne in round one.

In May, 1929, Kidd announced his retirement from VFL football, due to a severe knee injury he sustained in a round three match against South Melbourne in 1928. He actually returned to play one game with Essendon in 1929, in round three, before coaching the Tungamah Football Club in late 1929

Kidd returned to Essendon in 1930, then played two games with Carlton in 1931, unsure where Kidd played in 1932 and then move onto Fitzroy in 1933 and played one game against Melbourne in round 15 at the MCG and was named their fourth best player.

Kidd played with Oakleigh Football Club from 1934 to 1936 and was their coach in 1935 and 1936, but resigned as coach of the Oakleigh Football Club in May, 1936 due to an injured shoulder and a short while later was cleared to Camberwell Football Club where he played seven games.

Kidd also played 121 first eleven games of Melbourne District Cricket with Essendon Cricket Club between 1925/26 and 1943/44. Kidd was also captain of Essendon CC too.

Jack Kidd died at the Royal Melbourne Hospital in Parkville on 26 March 1960 and was cremated at Fawkner Memorial Park.
