= Gary Cameron =

Australian rules footballer and coach

Personal information
- Born: 14 June 1966 (age 60)
- Original team: Katamatite
- Height: 173 cm (5 ft 8 in)
- Weight: 70 kg (154 lb)
- Position: Ruck Rover

Playing career^{1}
Years	Club	Games (Goals)
1987–1990	Geelong	26 (18)

Coaching career
Years	Club	Games (W–L–D)
2007	South Adelaide	4
- ^{1} Playing statistics correct to the end of 2007.

Gary Cameron (born 14 June 1966) is a former Australian rules footballer who played with Geelong in the Victorian (VFL) and Australian Football Leagues.

Cameron, a Katamatite recruit, who won the Tungamah Football League best and fairest award, the Lawless Medal in 1986, played eight games for Geelong in each of his first two seasons, 1987 and 1988. He appeared in the final five rounds of the 1989 VFL season, but did not take part in the Geelong's finals series. After another five games in 1990, Cameron left to play for South Adelaide Football Club in the South Australian National Football League (SANFL).

Cameron was captain / coach of Wangaratta in the Ovens & Murray Football League in 1998 and 1999.

In 2007, Cameron briefly served as caretaker coach of South Adelaide, when coach Robert Pyman was sacked. Cameron was coach for four rounds.
