= Katamatite Football Club =

Australian rules football and netball club

Katamatite

Names
- Full name: Katamatite Football Netball Club
- Nickname: Tigers
- Club song: 'Were the Katty Tigers'

Club details
- Founded: 1891
- Colours
- Competition: Picola & District FNL
- President: Casey Brown
- Coach: Jedd Wright
- Captain: Nichol Clurey
- Premierships: (6): 1950, 1979, 1996, 2001, 2025, 2026
- Former ground: Katamatite Recreation Reserve

Uniforms
Home

Other information
- Official website: Katamatite FNC website

The Katamatite Football Netball Club, nicknamed the Tigers, is an Australian rules football and netball club based in the small Victorian town of Katamatite.

The club teams currently compete in the Picola & District League.

== History ==
Katamatite's first documented match dates back to June, 1891, when the local team travelled to Dookie and were soundly beaten.

In 1892 and 1893 they played in the Geyde's Victoria Hotel (Cobram) Trophy competition.

In 1894 and 1895, Katamatite played some friendly matches against other local towns, after their application to join the Goulburn Valley Football Association was rejected.

During the mid 1890s, it appears that the local Katamatite footballers, played with the Muckatah Football Club and played some of their home games on the Katamatite ground too.

In May, 1898, a meeting of about 40 locals was held at Allan's Hotel, Katamatite with the view of re-forming the football club and entering the Tungamah or Yarrawonga Football Association.

In June, 1911 at Lease's Hotel, Katamatite, the Murray Valley Junior Football Association was formed from the following clubs – Barooga, Burramine, Cobram, Katamatite and Muckatah, with the Katamatite "Ramblers" (who wore a maroon jumper) winning the inaugural premiership and were runners up to Muckatah in 1912.

In 1914, Katamatite entered a senior team in the Goulburn Valley Football Association (GVFA) and lost the 1st semi final to the Cobram Football Club.

In 1915, the senior side pulled out of the GVFA, but then entered a junior team in the Katandra Junior Football Association.

At a soldiers recruiting meeting held in Katamatite in July, 1915 and then also shortly afterwards at a friendly football match, a number of local footballers signed their military enlistments cards to come forward and "help their King and country in the hour of need".

After World War I had finished, Katamatite returned to the GVFA in 1920 and 1921, only to be "outed" in 1922 when the GVFA club delegates decided to have a railway line association, which meant that Katamatite and Benbartha club's were left in limbo just prior to the start of the football season.

In 1924, Katamatite were admitted into the Dookie Football Association and were defeated by the Dookie Football Club in the Preliminary Final.

On Saturday, 20 July 1925 Katamatite – 78.19 – 487 defeated Wattville – 1.3 – 9, in what was a record score in country football at the time. The apparent score and result was deemed as a no result and both club's were charged with unseemly conduct due to deliberately contriving a match result to win the minor premiership. Also in 1925 the club's colours were blue and white.

Katamatite and Dookie were denied the right to play off in the 1925 grand final when club delegate's abandoned the season abruptly for what seems like no real apparent reason.

In April 1926 the Dookie Football Association was wound up when three of the six clubs we not prepared to reform, which left only Katamatite and Yabba left, which meant Katamatite went into recess for the season.

In 1927, Katamatite joined the Katamatite Dookie Football Association and made the grand final against Yabba, with Yabba winning 9.8 – 62 to 4.11 – 35 played at Dookie.

At the club's 1930 Annual General Meeting, it was decided to change the club's colours to green and gold.

The club went into recess between 1933 and 1936, after the Katandra Football Association folded in early 1933. The club officially re-formed in 1936, with the hope of returning to a local competition in 1937.

In May, 1937, Katamatite applied to enter the Benalla Mulwala Football League, but their offer was rejected by club delegates, which once again left the club without a competition to play.

Katamatite joined the Benalla Tungamah Football League in 1938 and 1939, then moved across to the Murray Football League (MFL) in 1940. The MFL went into recess after the first round of matches was complete (Rd.7), due to World War II.

Katamatite returned to the MFL after World War II in 1946 and 1947, then moved across to the Murray Valley North East Football League in 1948, then went into recess in 1949.

From 1950, the club affiliated with the Picola & District Football League (P&DFL) for the first time. In its very first season in the competition Katamatite went top thanks to an 11.17 (83) to 8.5 (53) grand final defeat of Numurkah Seconds. The Tigers again reached the grand final in 1952, but lost to Picola, a result that was repeated two years later.

In 1956 Katamatite left the P&DFL to compete in the Benalla Tungamah Football League. The club remained in this competition, which dropped the word ‘Benalla’ from its name in 1967, until 1994, winning a single senior grade flag in 1979, with Katamatite: 17.11 – 113 defeating Katandra: 14.15 – 99.

The Tigers’ resumption in the P&DFL in 1995 was not quite as spectacular as their original foray as on this occasion it took them two seasons to procure a premiership. Their victims in the 1996 grand final were Strathmerton, Katamatite winning a dour tussle by 25 points, 7.9 (51) to 3.8 (26). The Bulldogs gained revenge the following year when they downed the Tigers in the grand final by 29 points, 12.12 (84) to 7.13 (55). Matthew Collins was awarded the 'Pearce Medal' as the leagues Fairest & Best player for the year.

Around the turn of the century Katamatite played off for the PDFL's senior grade flag on three occasions, with a victory over Blighty in 2001 being sandwiched in between losses to the same club in 2000 and to Katandra in 2004.

When the PDFL was divided into North West and South East Divisions in 2009 Katamatite, competing in the latter, struggled initially, and even succumbed to a winless wooden spoon in 2011. However, thereafter their fortunes improved somewhat, and in 2014 they reached the grand final only to lose heavily to Tungamah. Further finals appearances followed in 2015 and 2016.

The 2017 season was a season to forget for the Tigers; failing to reach finals and recording just four wins under co-coaches Tyler Sprunt and Matt Dwyer.

The 2018 pre-season has seen Jedd Wright appointed the senior coach for the coming season.

== Football competitions timeline ==
Katamatite FC have played in the following football competitions –

Gedye's Victoria Hotel Trophy

- 1892 & 1893

Katamatite Football Club

- 1894 to 1897. Club did not play in any official competition, but did play some friendly matches against other local towns.

Yarrawonga & Border Football Association

- 1898

Katamatite Football Club

- 1899 & 1900. Club did not play in any official competition, but did play some friendly matches against other local towns.

Federal District Football Association

- 1901 & 1902.

Katamatite Football Club

- 1903 to 1905. Club did not play in any official competition, but did play some friendly matches against other local towns.

Goulburn Valley Football Association

- 1906 to 1909

Katamatite Football Club

- 1910 Club in recess, but officially supported the Burramine Boosey Football Club in the GVFA.

Murray Valley Junior Football Association

- 1911 to 1913 – Katamatite Ramblers

Goulburn Valley Football Association

- 1914

Katandra Junior Football Association

- 1915

Katamatite Football Club

- 1916 & 1919. Club did not play in any official competition, due to World War I but did play some friendly patriotic fund raising matches against other local towns.

Goulburn Valley Football Association

- 1920 & 1921

Katamatite Football Club

- 1922. Club did not play in any official competition, as it was refused entry into the GVFA as the town was not on a railway line.

Dookie Football Association

- 1923 to 1925.

Katamatite Football Club

- 1926. Club did not play in any official competition, as the Dookie FA was wound up.

Katamatite Dookie Football Association

- 1927 to 1928

Katandra Football Association

- 1929 to 1932

Katamatite Football Club

- 1933 to 1937. Club in recess & did not play in any official competition, after the Katandra FA was wound up in early 1933.

Benalla Tungamah Football League

- 1938 & 1939

Murray Football League

- 1940

Katamatite Football Club

- 1941 to 1945. Club in recess due to World War II.

Murray Football League

- 1946 & 1947

Murray Valley & North East Football League

- 1948

Katamatite Football Club

- 1949. Club in recess.

Picola & District Football League

- 1950 to 1955

Benalla Tungamah Football League

- 1956 to 1966

Tungamah Football League

- 1967 to 1994

Picola & District Football League

- 1995 to present day

== Football Premierships ==
Senior Football

League	Total flags	Premiership year(s)
Murray Valley Junior Football Association	1	1911
Picola & District Football League	5	1950, 1996, 2001, 2025, 2026
Tungamah FL	1	1979

== Football League Fairest & Best Award Winners ==
Murray Football League – Fairest & Best Award – O'Dwyer Medal

- 1947 – Bill Lumsden

Benalla Tungamah Football League – Fairest & Best Award – Lawless Medal

- 1960 – N Trewin
- 1967 – T Murphy
- 1978 – Bernie Londigan
- 1979 – Andy Alderton
- 1982 – Andy Alderton
- 1986 – Gary Cameron

Picola & District Football League – Fairest & Best Award – Pearce Medal

- 1996 – Matthew Collins
- 2009 - Jason Wild
- 2014 - Tyson Saunders
- 2019 - John Woodcock

== Katamatite FC players who played in the VFL/AFL ==
The following footballers played with Katamatite FC, prior to playing senior football in the VFL, with the year indicating their VFL debut.

- 1905 – Rod McGregor – Carlton
- 1948 – Bill Lumsden – St. Kilda
- 1981 – Darren Flanigan – Geelong
- 1984 – Michael Howard – Melbourne
- 1987 – Gary Cameron – Geelong
- 2009 – Sam Wright – North Melbourne
- 2013 – Tom Clurey – Port Adelaide
