= Barrie Beattie =

Australian rules footballer

Personal information
- Full name: Barrie Beattie
- Born: 6 December 1944 (age 81)
- Original team: Wangaratta Rovers
- Height: 188 cm (6 ft 2 in)
- Weight: 87 kg (192 lb)

Playing career^{1}
Years	Club	Games (Goals)
1964–1966	Footscray	4 (4)
- ^{1} Playing statistics correct to the end of 1966.

Barrie Beattie (born 6 December 1944) is a former Australian rules footballer who played for the Footscray Football Club in the Victorian Football League (VFL).
