= Maurie McLeish =

Australian rules footballer (1899–1972)

Personal information
- Full name: Maurice McLeish
- Born: 5 June 1899; Yea, Victoria
- Died: 28 August 1972 (aged 73); Yea, Victoria
- Original team: Yea
- Height: 178 cm (5 ft 10 in)
- Weight: 74 kg (163 lb)

Playing career^{1}
Years	Club	Games (Goals)
1920	St Kilda	1 (0)
- ^{1} Playing statistics correct to the end of 1920.

Maurie McLeish (5 June 1899 – 28 August 1972) was an Australian rules footballer who played with St Kilda in the Victorian Football League (VFL).
