= Mulwala Football Club =

Australian rules football and netball club

Mulwala

Names
- Full name: Mulwala Football Netball Club
- Nickname: Lions

2025 season
- After finals: 3rd
- Home-and-away season: 2nd (14/4)
- Leading goalkicker: Charley McKenna (43)
- Best and fairest: Owen Conway

Club details
- Founded: 1882
- Colours
- Competition: Murray FNL
- Coach: Rohan Davies, Jackson Gash
- Captain(s): Dylan McNamara, Lachlan Rouel
- Premierships: (8): 1912, 1950, 1959, 1968, 1969, 1990, 2022, 2023
- Ground: Lonsdale Reserve, Mulwala (capacity: 10,000)

Uniforms
Home

Other information
- Official website: http://www.mulwalafnc.sportingpulse.net

The Mulwala Football Club, nicknamed the Lions, is an Australian rules football and netball club based in the town of Mulwala located in the Riverina district of New South Wales.

The first recorded match was Mulwala verses Murray Football Club on Saturday, 23 September 1882.

Between 1883 and 1886 a Selector's Union Football Club played their home games in Mulwala and played against Corowa and Border United for the Camplin Cup.

In 1894, the Tungamah Caladonian Society donated 20 medals to be competed for by the following football teams – Burramine South, Mulwala, Tungamah, Yarrawonga and Youarang.

In 1898 Mulwala FC competed in the Yarrawonga & District Football Association against – Burramine South, Bundalong, Katamatite, Telford and Yarrawonga.

In 1902, Mulwala were runners up to St. James / Devenish United Football Club in the Yarrawonga and Border Football Association.

Mulwala were runners up to Rennie in the 1939 and 1940 Coreen & District Football League grand final.

In 1948, Burramine defeated Mulwala by one point to win the premiership of the Murray Valley North East Football League.

Mulwala have competed in the Murray FNL, in both football and netball since 1987.

== League competitions timeline ==
Tungamah Caledonian Society Football Competition

- 1894

Yarrawonga District Football Association

- 1898–1919;

Benalla Mulwala Football League

- 1920–1937;

Coreen & District Football League

- 1938–1940;

Mulwala Football Club

- 1941–1945 Club in recess, due to World War II

Murray Valley North-East Football League

- 1946–1948;

Benalla Tungamah Football League

- 1949–1966

Tungamah Football League

- 1967–1986

Murray Football League

- 1987 to present day

== Premierships ==
Senior Football

- Yarrawonga & Border Football Association (1):
  - 1912
- Murray Valley Football League (1):
  - 1950
- Tungamah Football League (3):
  - 1959, 1968, 1969
- Murray Football League (3):
  - 1990, 2022, 2023

== Football League – Best and Fairest Winners ==
Seniors

Benalla Tungamah Football League

- 1955 – Les Squires
- 1964 - Trevor Donovan

Tungamah Football League

- 1977 – B Cooper

Murray Football League

- 1987 – Phillip Beams
- 1999 – Robert Lamberti
- 2001 – Robert Lamberti
- 2005 – Jason Sanderson
- 2019 – Jackson Gash
- 2023 – Jackson Gash

== Mulwala FC players who played in the VFL / AFL ==
The following players played with Mulwala, prior to playing senior football in the VFL, with the year indicating their VFL debut.

- 1927 – Frank Seymour – Carlton & Fitzroy
- 1974 – Dennis Payne – Melbourne
- 1980 - Les Parish - Fitzroy
- 2002 – Mark McGough – Collingwood & St. Kilda
- 2024 - Caleb Mitchell - Sydney Swans
