= Charlie Priestley =

Australian rules footballer, born 1916

Personal information
- Full name: Charles Edgar Cecil Priestley
- Born: 22 June 1916; Seymour, Victoria, Australia
- Died: 26 September 1992 (aged 76)
- Original team: Dookie
- Height: 180 cm (5 ft 11 in)
- Weight: 85 kg (187 lb)
- Position: Utility

Playing career^{1}
Years	Club	Games (Goals)
1938–1947	Richmond	109 (12)
- ^{1} Playing statistics correct to the end of 1947.

Charles Priestley (22 June 1916 – 26 September 1992) was an Australian rules footballer who played with Richmond in the Victorian Football League (VFL).

Priestley played in the back pocket for Richmond in their 1944 VFL Grand Final loss to Fitzroy. He missed selection in their premiership team the previous year. He continued to be involved with Richmond after his retirement, serving as a board member of 36 years. During that period he spent some time as chairman of selectors.
