= Tungamah Football Club =

Australian Rules football club

Tungamah

Names
- Full name: Tungamah Football Netball Club Inc.
- Nickname(s): Bears
- Club song: "Thank God I'm a Tunga Boy"

Club details
- Founded: 1882
- Colours: Maroon Yellow White
- Competition: Murray Football League
- President: Damien Doyle & Jason Arnold
- Coach: Sam Ferguson & Sean Johns
- Ground(s): Jubilee Park, Tungamah

Other information
- Official website: Tungamah Football Club Website

The Tungamah Football Netball Club Inc, nicknamed the Bears, is an Australian Rules football club playing in the Picola & District Football League.

The club is based in the small Victorian town of Tungamah, a town of just 300 people located approximately 250 km north of Melbourne.

The earliest recorded match involving Tungamah was a game against Lake Rowan on Saturday, 29 July 1882.

In 1883 there was also a Murray District Football Club based in Tungamah.

Tungamah FC joined the Benalla Tungamah Football League in 1938.

The club changed leagues following an administration disagreement between the AFL Goulburn-Valley and the Picola & District Football League in 2019, but returned to the P&DFL for season 2021.

== Premierships ==
Seniors

League	Total flags	Senior Premiership(s)
Yarrawonga Football Association	2	1886,1895
Wilby & District Football Association	3	1914, 1940, 1941
Benalla Mulwala Football League	2	1934, 1936
Benalla Tungamah Football League	1	1938
Murray Valley Football League	3	1944,1946,1947
Tungamah Football League	2	1976, 1986
Picola & District Football League	6	1999, 2008, 2009, 2013, 2014, 2015

Reserves

?

Thirds

?

Fourths

?

== VFL / AFL Players ==
The following footballers were either born in Tungamah or played with the Tungamah FC prior to playing VFL / AFL senior grade football. The year indicates their VFL debut.

- 1898 – Matthew Fell – Collingwood
- 1899 – Wilfred Fell – Collingwood
- 1909 – Joe Bourke – Richmond
- 1913 – Don Munro – Fitzroy
- 1918 – Claude Fell – Richmond
- 1920 – Les Carbarns – St. Kilda & Hawthorn
- 1920 – Sir Albert Chadwick – Melbourne & Hawthorn
- 1924 – Ted Bourke – Richmond & South Melbourne
- 1926 – Jack Kidd – Essendon, Carlton & Fitzroy
- 1952 - Kevin Bond - Hawthorn
- 1933 – Jack Cooper – Carlton
- 1980 – Les Parish – Fitzroy & Melbourne
