= Albert Deagan =

Australian rules footballer

Personal information
- Full name: Albert Edward Deagan
- Born: 14 August 1902; Dookie, Victoria
- Died: 3 July 1968 (aged 65); Coburg, Victoria
- Original team: Yabba

Playing career^{1}
Years	Club	Games (Goals)
1925	St Kilda	3 (1)
- ^{1} Playing statistics correct to the end of 1925.

Albert Edward Deagan (14 August 1902 – 3 July 1968) was an Australian rules footballer who played for the St Kilda Football Club in the Victorian Football League (VFL).
