= Pat Ryan (Australian footballer) =

Australian rules footballer

Personal information
- Full name: Patrick Daniel Ryan
- Born: 4 September 1886; Dookie, Victoria
- Died: 14 August 1937 (aged 47); Albury
- Original team: Dookie
- Height: 182 cm (6 ft 0 in)
- Weight: 84 kg (185 lb)

Playing career^{1}
Years	Club	Games (Goals)
1913	Carlton	1 (0)
- ^{1} Playing statistics correct to the end of 1913.

Pat Ryan (4 September 1886 – 14 August 1937) was an Australian rules footballer who played with Carlton in the Victorian Football League (VFL).
