= Yarrawonga Football Club =

Australian rules football and netball club

Yarrawonga

Names
- Full name: Yarrawonga Football Netball Club
- Nickname: Pigeons
- Best and fairest: Willie Wheeler

Club details
- Founded: 1889; 137 years ago
- Colours
- Competition: Ovens & Murray Football League
- President: Ross Mulquueriney
- CEO: Vicky Long
- Coach: Leigh Williams
- Captain(s): Mark Whiley & Tyler Bonat
- Premierships: O&MFL 1959, 1989, 2006, 2012, 2013, 2023
- Ground: JC Lowe Oval (capacity: 4,000)

Uniforms
Home

Other information
- Official website: yarrawongafnc.com.au

The Yarrawonga Football Netball Club, nicknamed the Pigeons, is an Australian rules football and netball club based in the town of Yarrawonga, Victoria located on the Murray River.

== Club history ==
The Yarrawonga teams have been competing in the Ovens & Murray Football League since 1930.

Prior to this the club had played in a line association that was based along the Benalla to Yarrawonga railway line. This association had frequent name changes dating back to 1889.

In 1957, it was confirmed that Bill Stephen would be coaching the club for at least the next three years (until 1960). He coached the team from 1958 to 1963.

The 2010 decade saw the Pigeons play the most finals of any Club in the Ovens and Murray (28).

Geelong's Tom Lonergan played for Yarrawonga before moving to Melbourne and being drafted into the Australian Football League. Former Carlton full forward Brendan Fevola played for Yarrawonga from 2012 until 2015.

In the 2018 AFL draft, Yarrawonga FNC had three players drafted to various AFL clubs: Ely Smith, James Jordon and Finbar O'Dwyer.

In Round 2, Easter Sunday 2020 at Mulwala, Xavier Leslie played his 300th Senior O&MFNL Game for the Pigeons, the club's only player to achieve such a feat.

== Premierships ==
Senior Football

- Benalla – Yarrawonga Line Football Association (7):
  - 1907, 1908, 1921, 1925, 1926, 1927,
- Yarrawonga & Border Football Association (2):
  - 1910, 1919
- Ovens & Murray Football League (6):
  - 1959, 1989, 2006, 2012, 2013, 2023
