= John Tossol =

Australian rules footballer

Personal information
- Full name: John Tossol
- Born: 26 August 1961 (age 65)
- Original team: Assumption College
- Height: 178 cm (5 ft 10 in)
- Weight: 75 kg (165 lb)

Playing career^{1}
Years	Club	Games (Goals)
1981–1982	Melbourne	2 (3)
- ^{1} Playing statistics correct to the end of 1981–1982.

John Tossol (born 26 August 1961) is a former Australian rules footballer who played with Melbourne in the Victorian Football League (VFL).
