= List of VFL/AFL and AFL Women's players from New South Wales =

This is a list of players from New South Wales to have played in the Australian Football League (AFL) and the AFL Women's (AFLW), the two pre-eminent competitions of Australian rules football.

== List of players ==
=== Men's ===
==== Current players ====
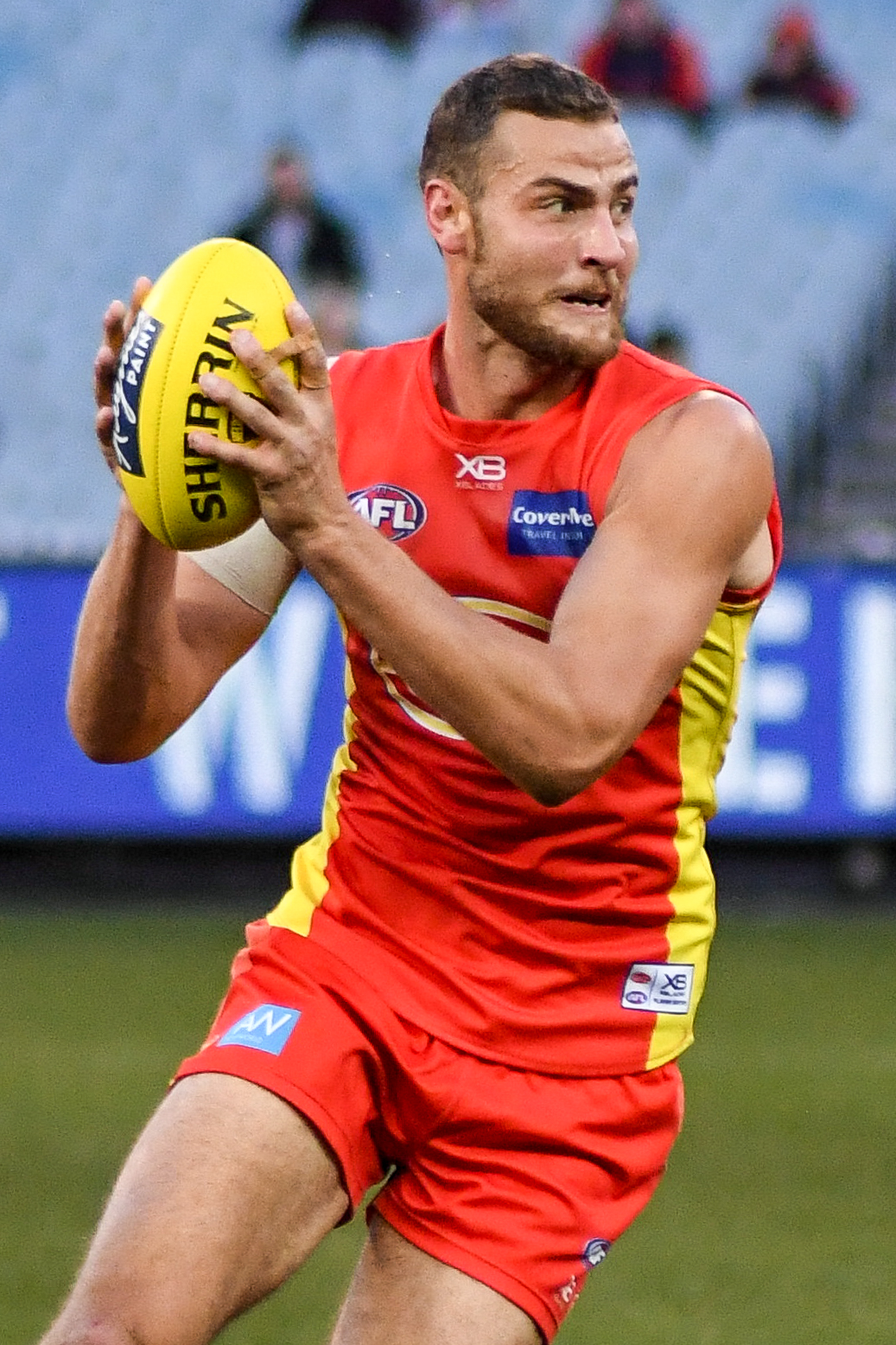
Jarrod Witts is from Normanhurst in Sydney

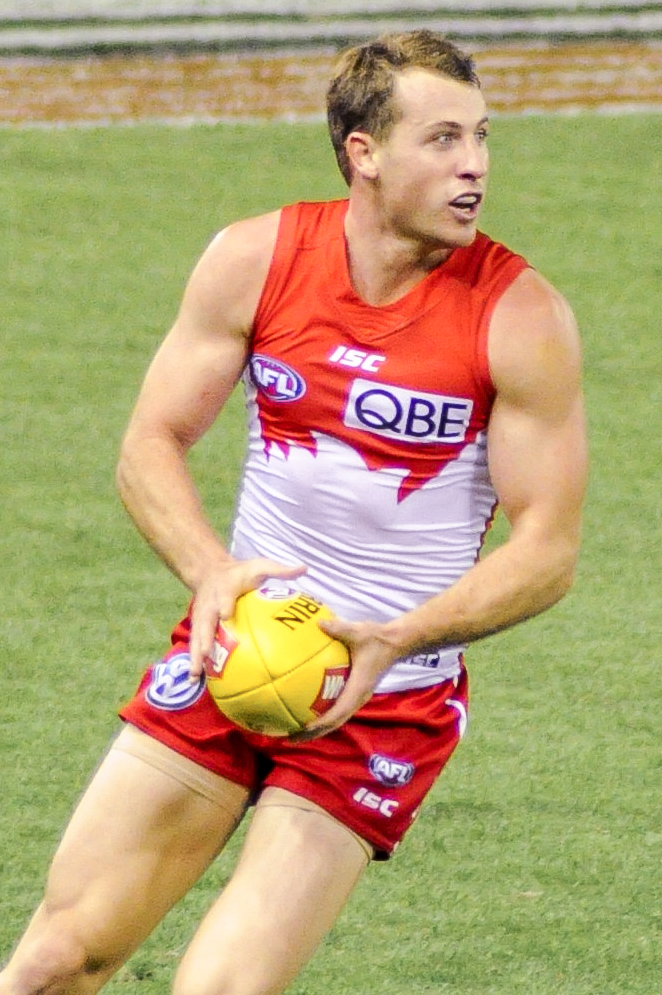
Harry Cunningham is from Wagga Wagga

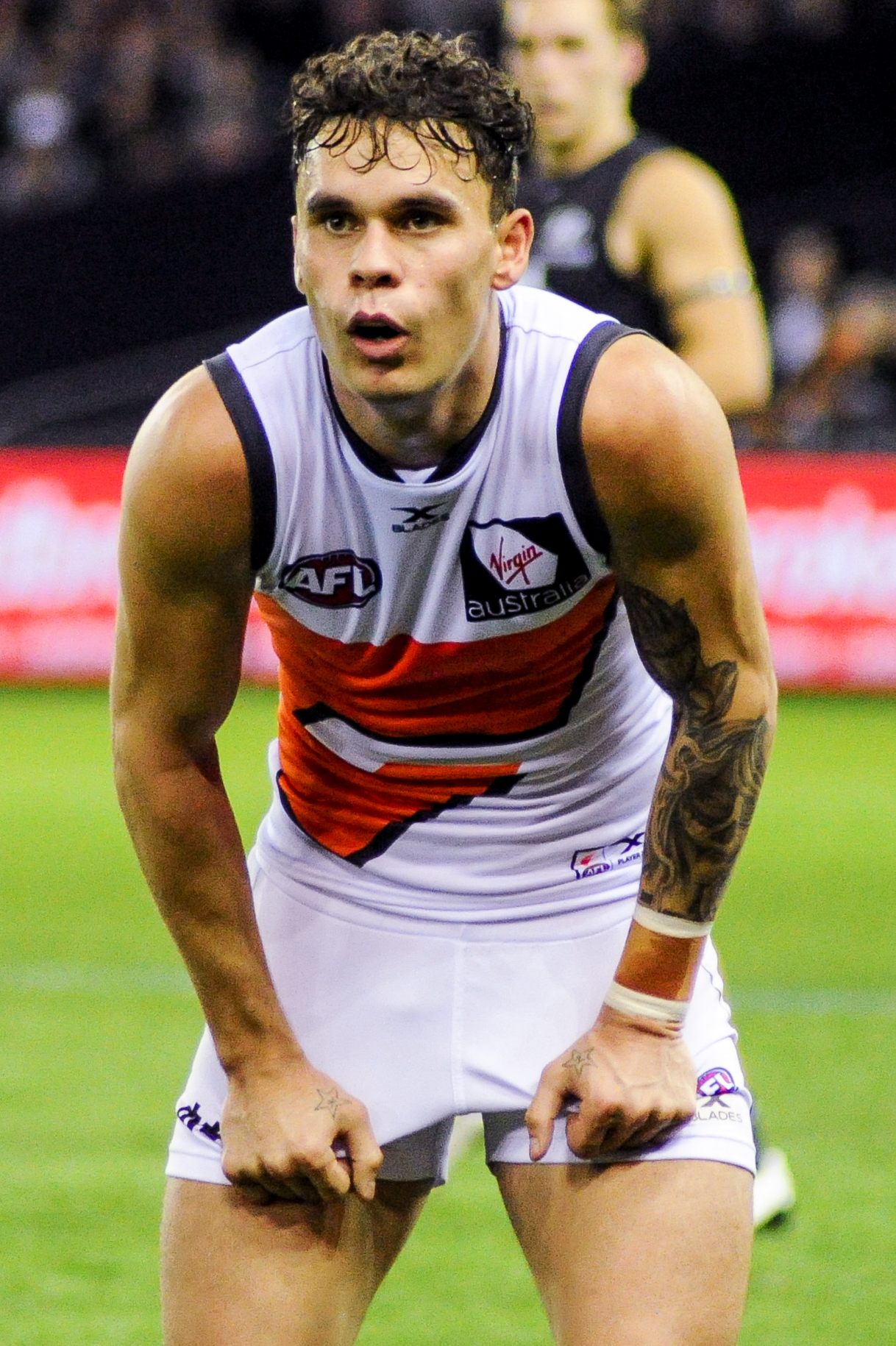
Zac Williams is from Narrandera

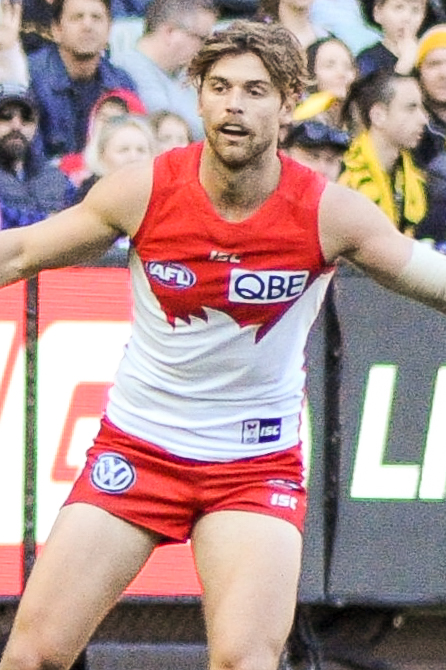
Dane Rampe is from Clovelly in Sydney

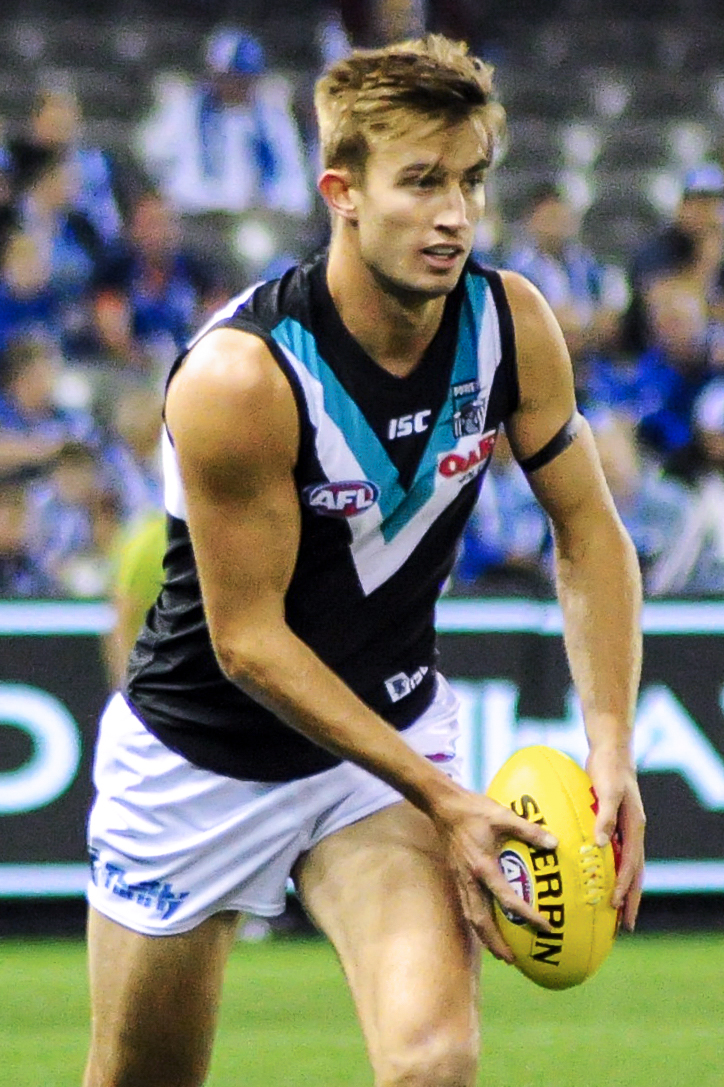
Dougal Howard is from Wagga Wagga

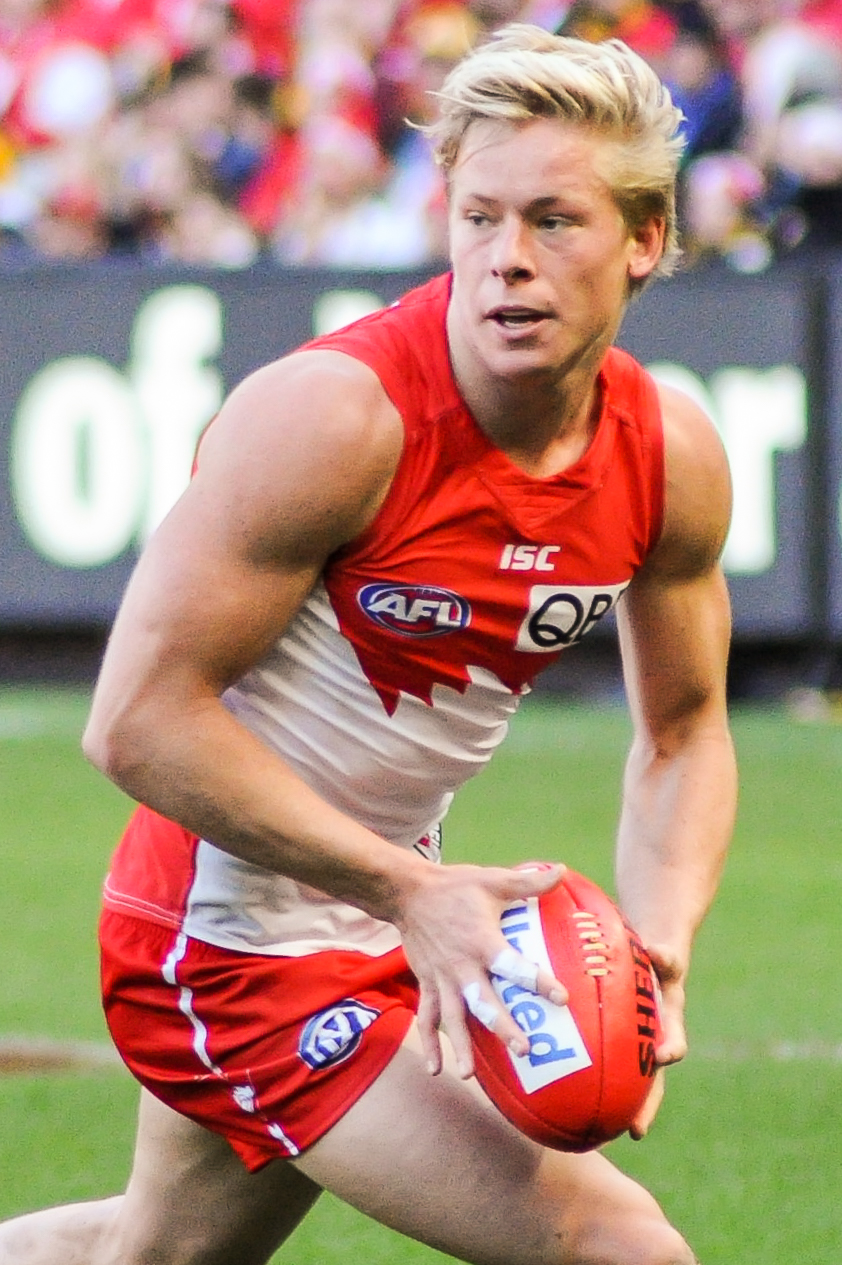
Isaac Heeney is from Maitland

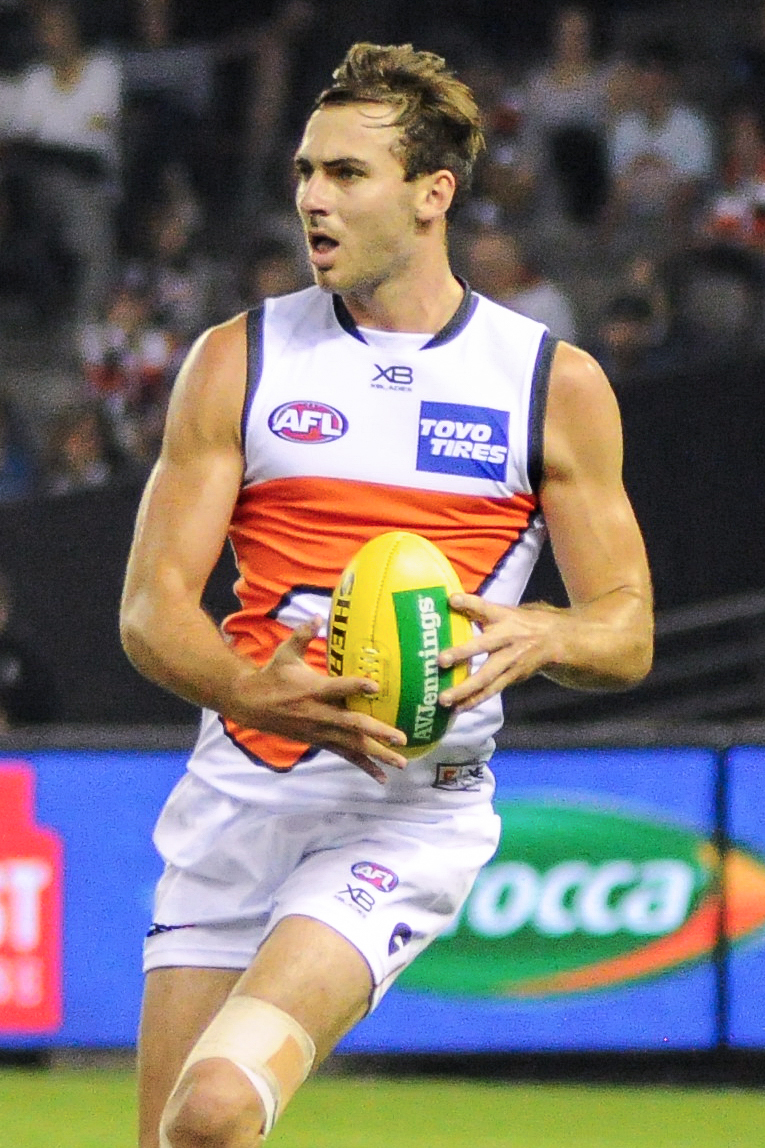
Jeremy Finlayson is from Culcairn

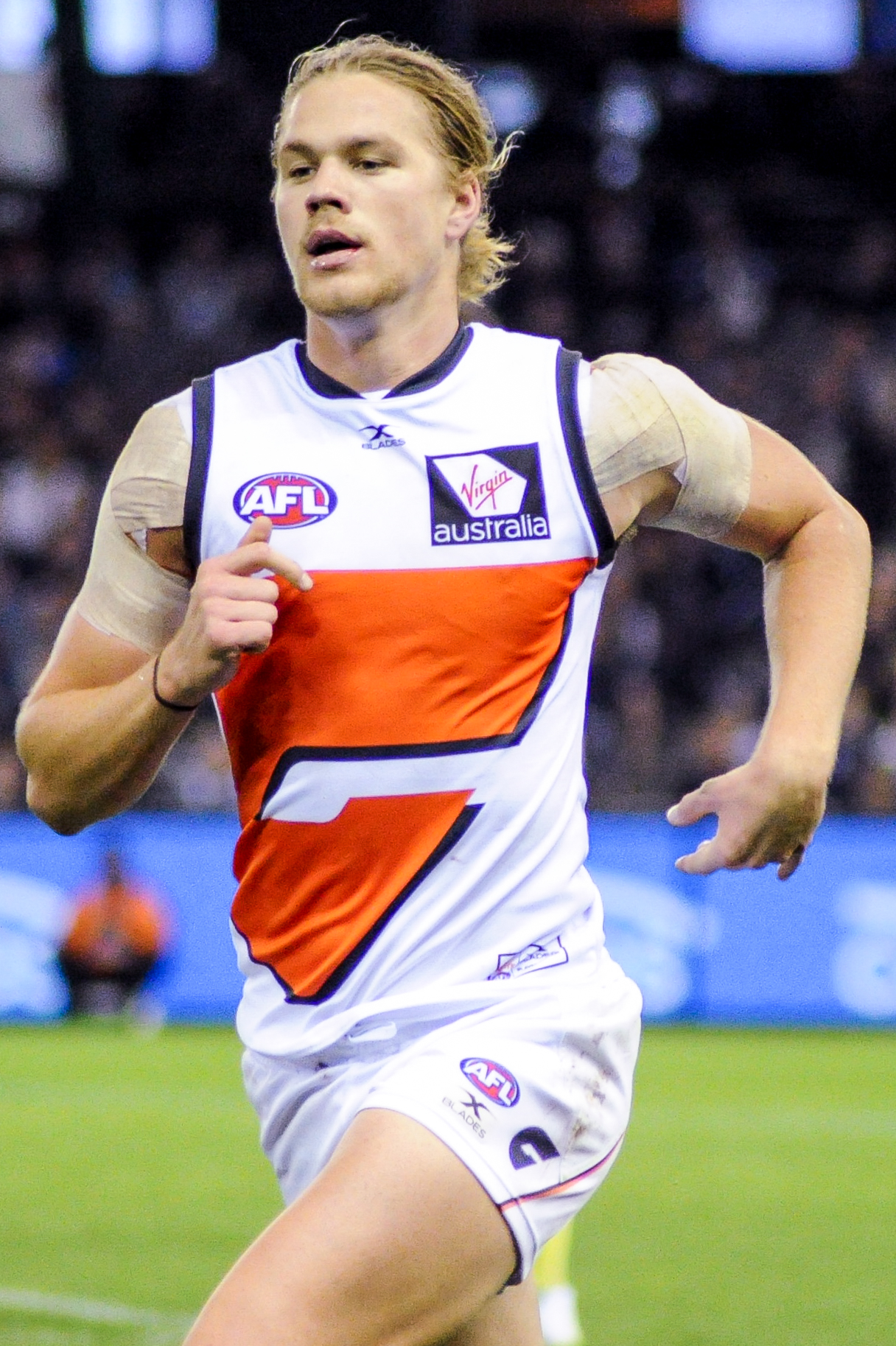
Harrison Himmelberg is from Wagga Wagga

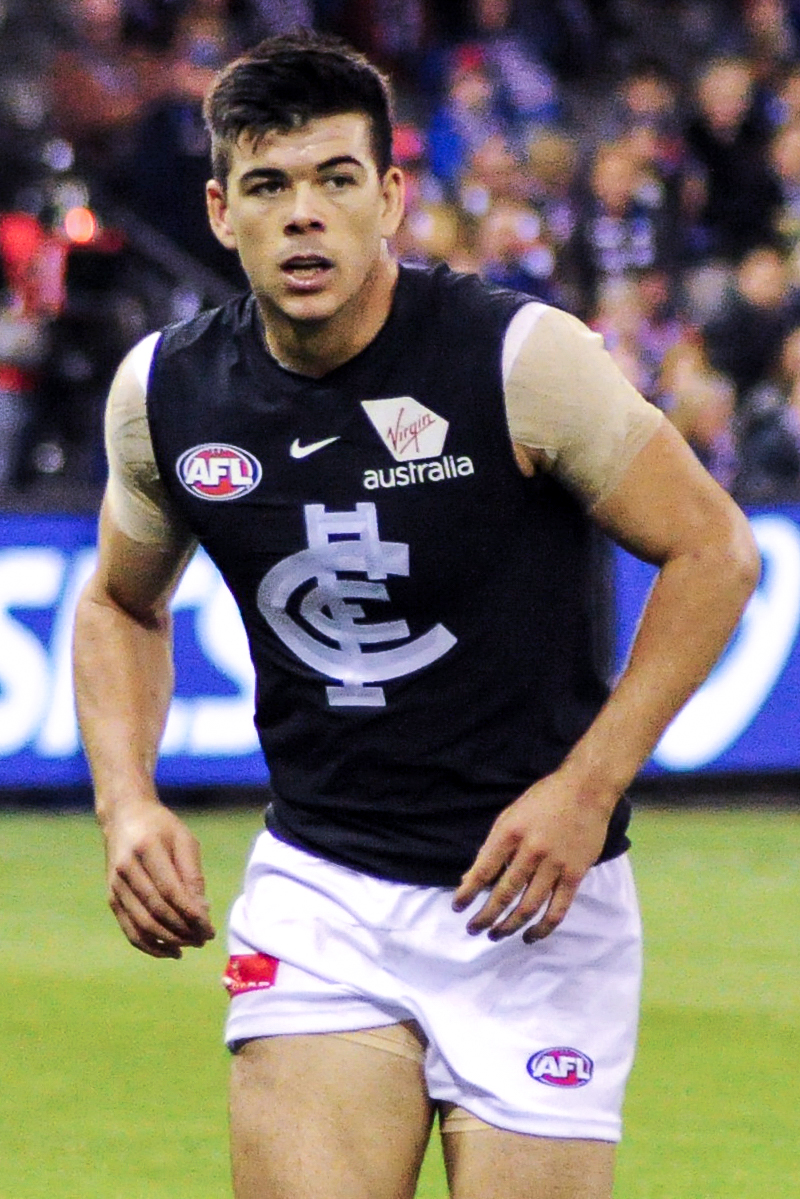
Matthew Kennedy is from Collingullie

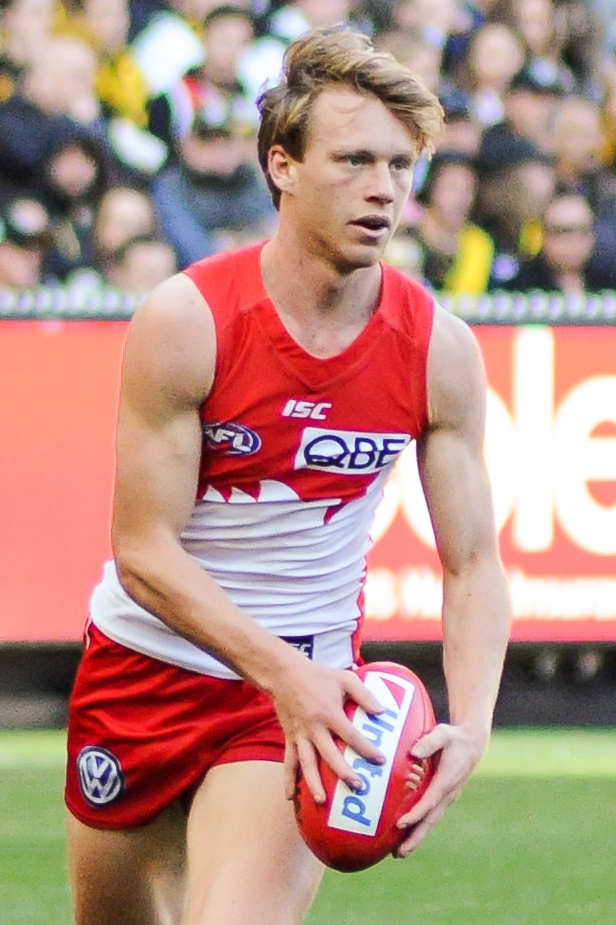
Callum Mills is from Northern Beaches in Sydney

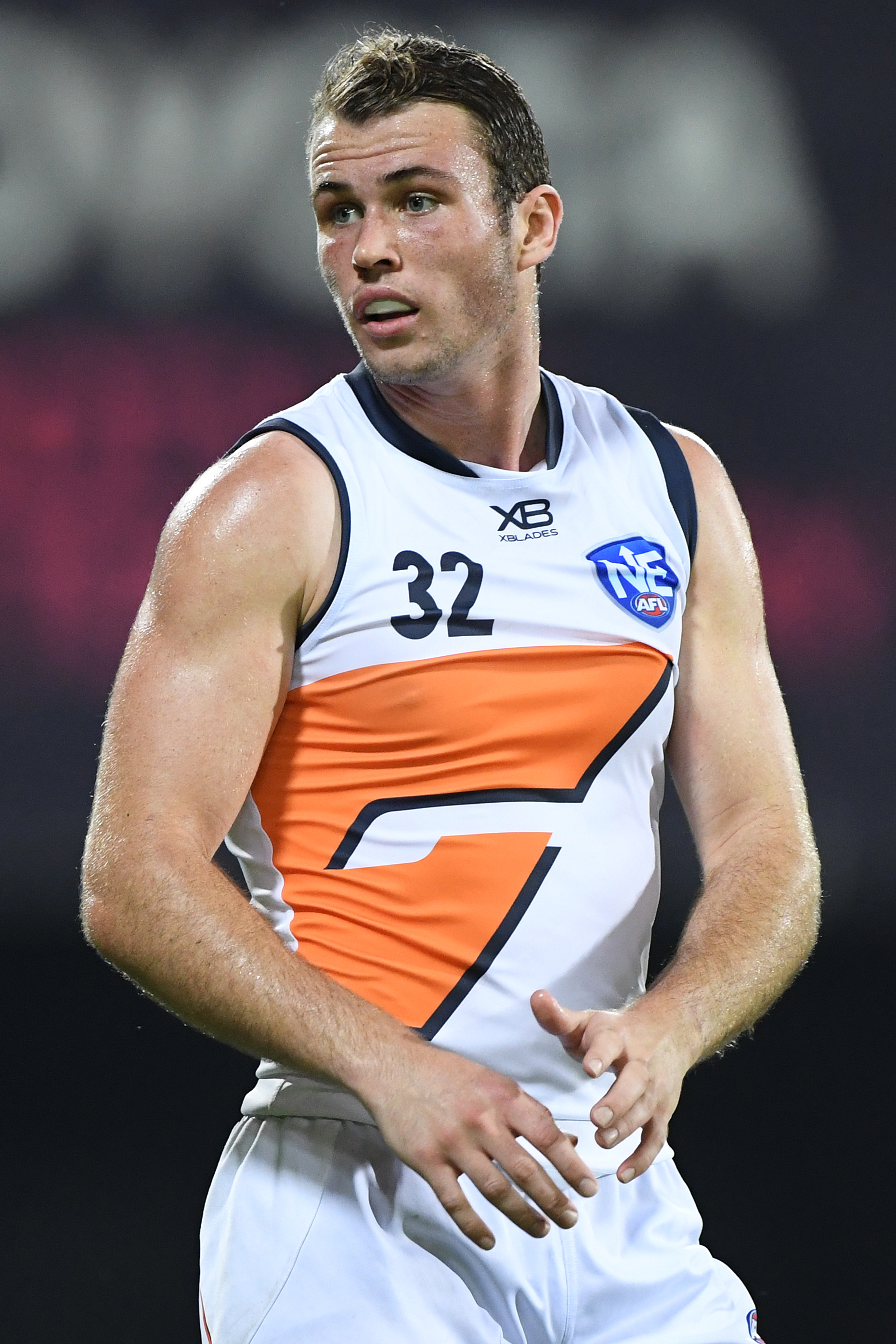
Kieren Briggs is from Sydney

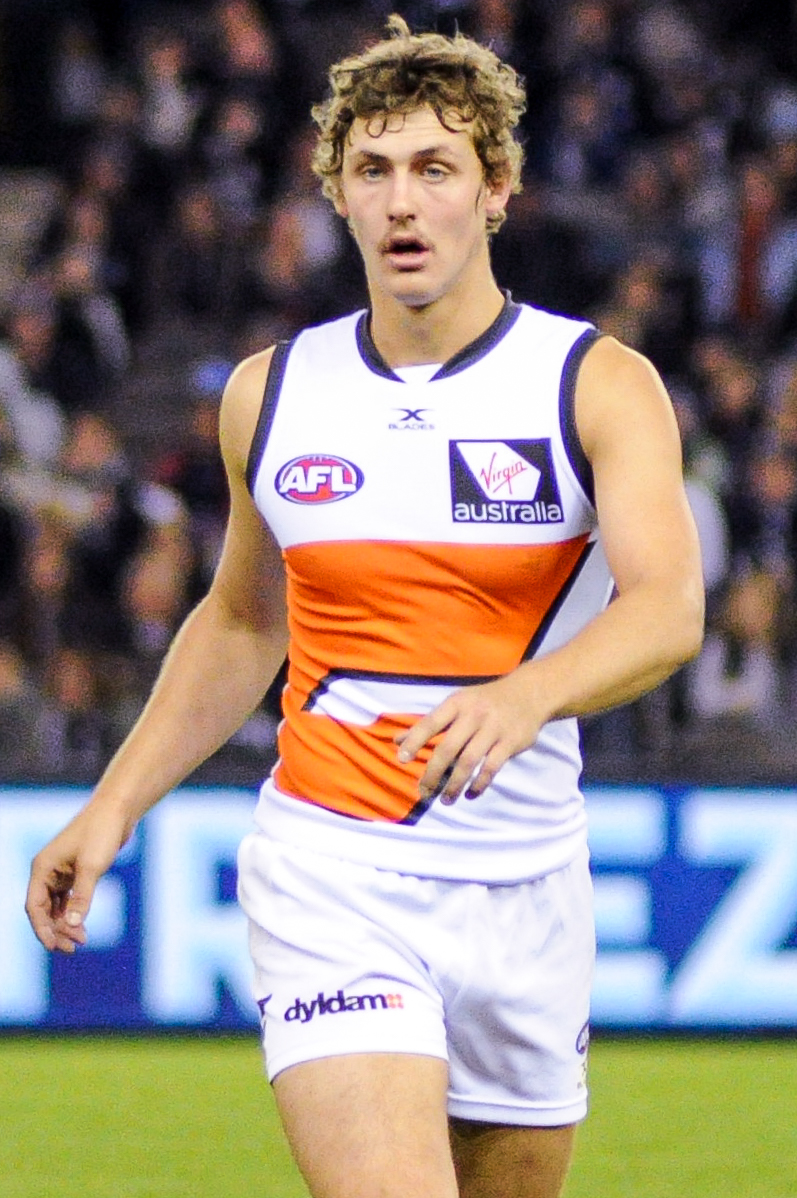
Harry Perryman is from Collingullie

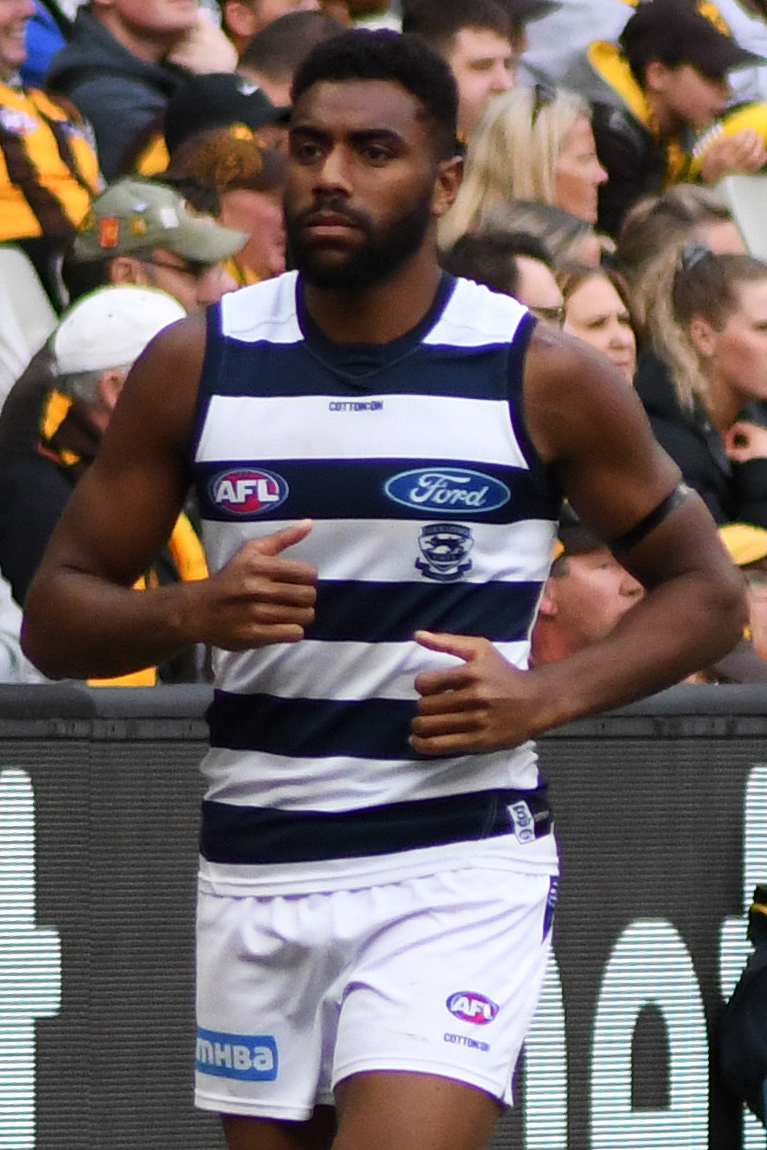
Esava Ratugolea is from Griffith

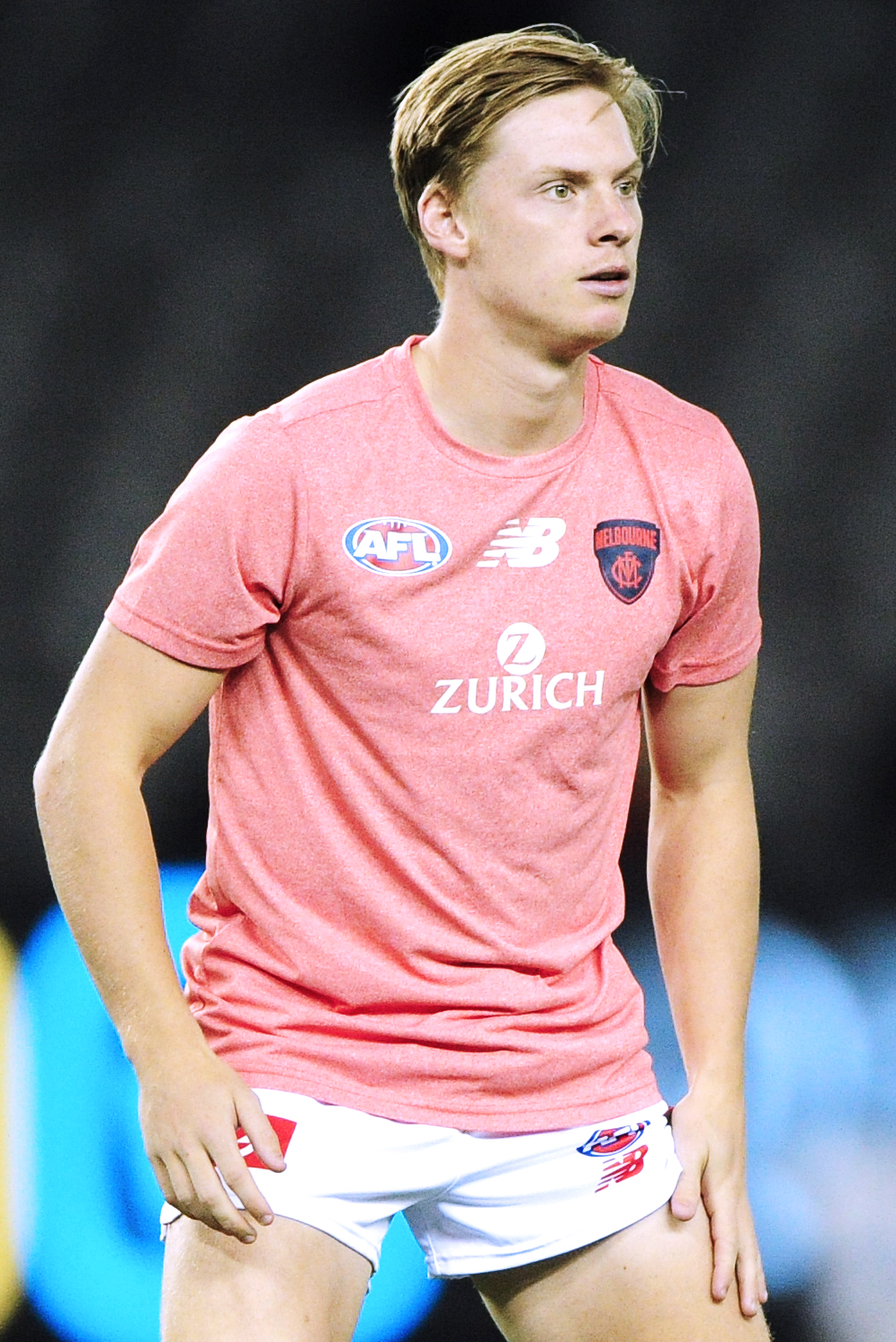
Charlie Spargo is from Albury

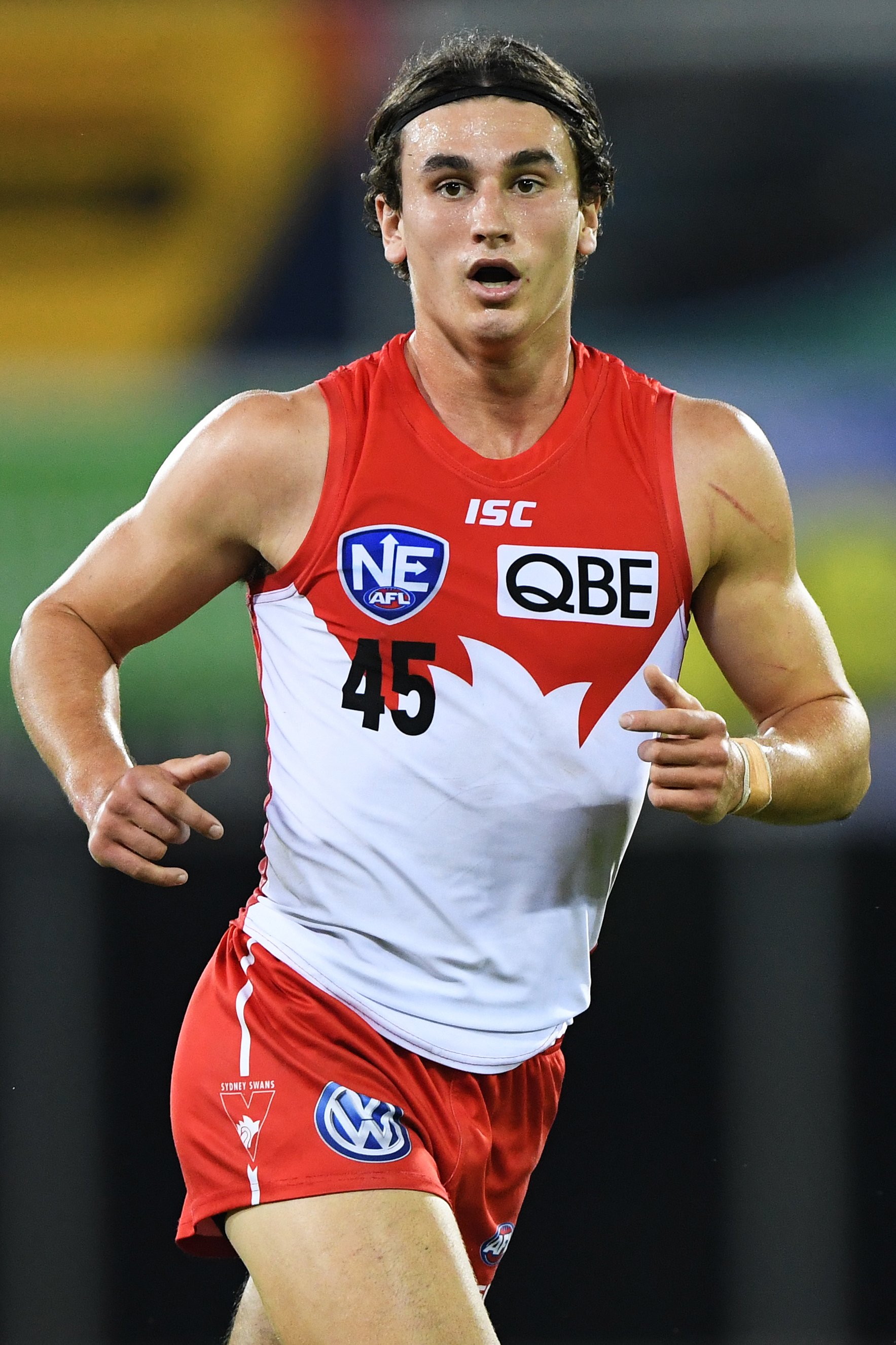
Sam Wicks is from Manly in Sydney

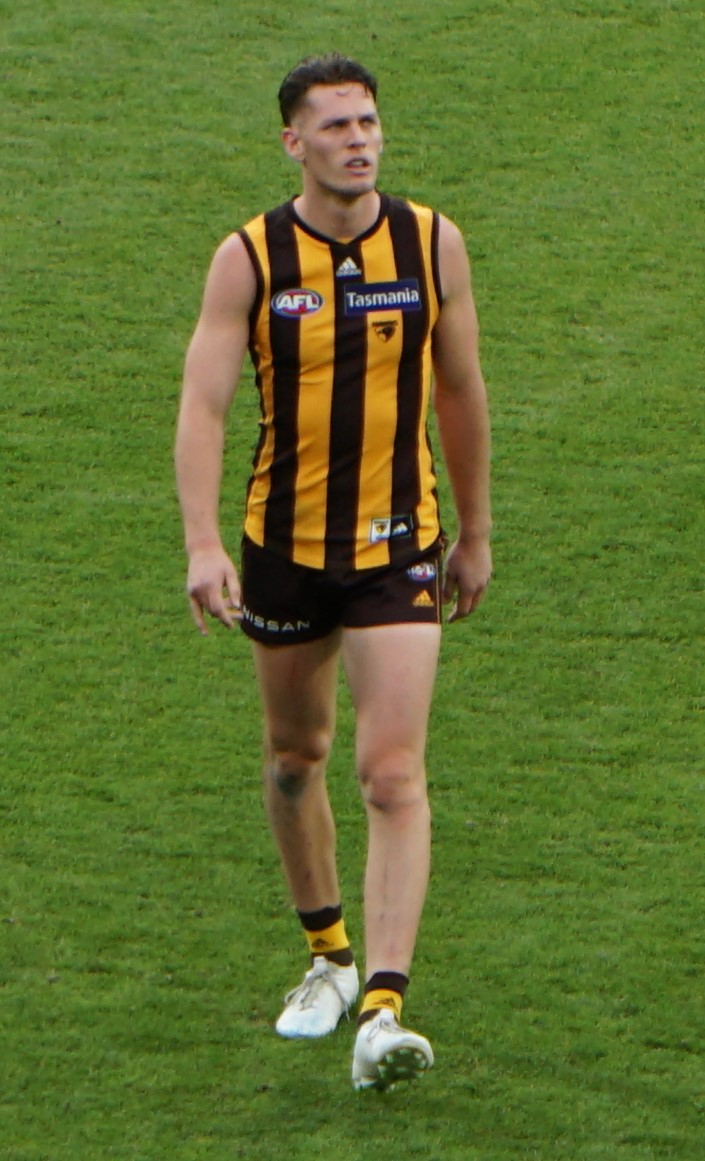
Jacob Koschitzke is from Albury

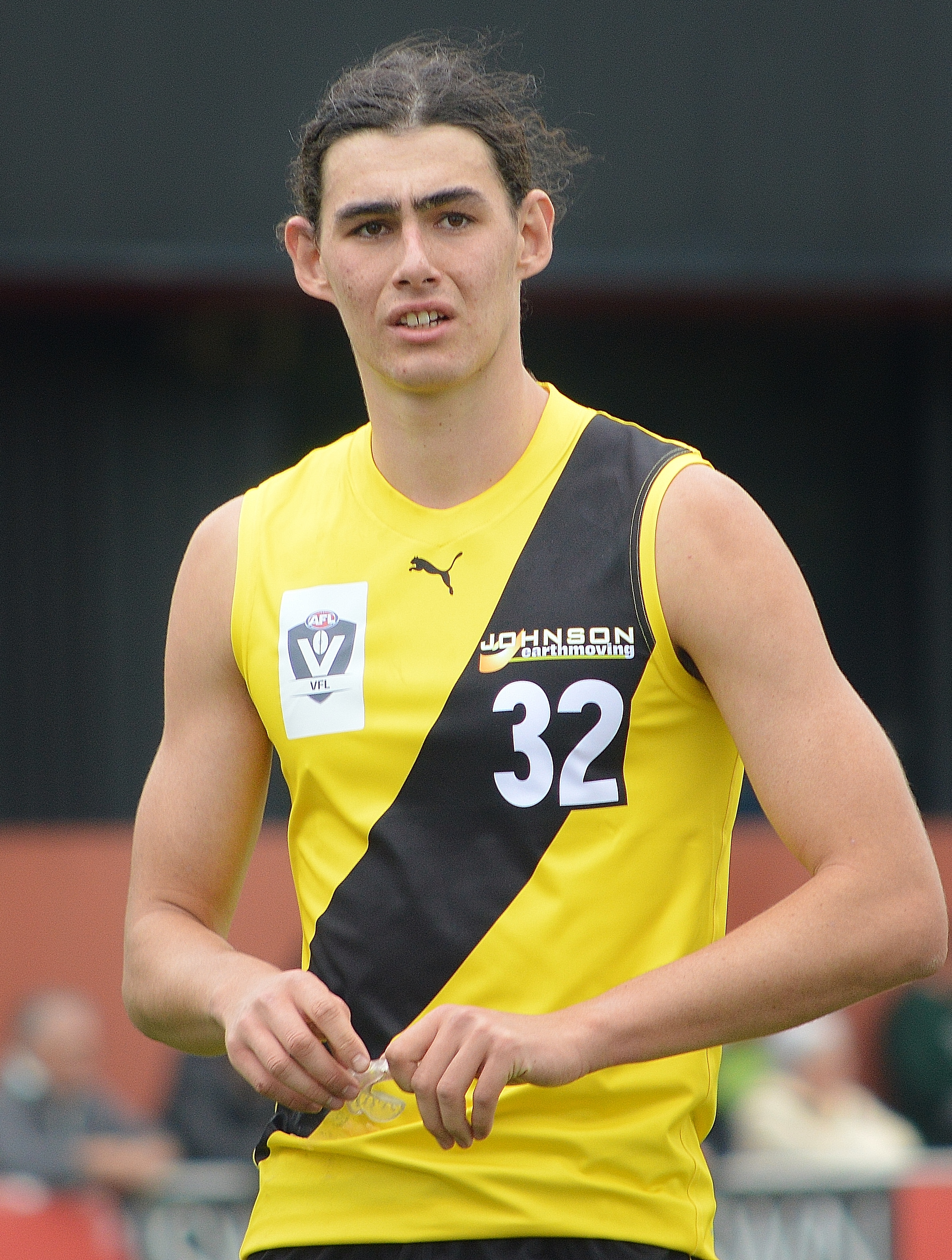
Samson Ryan is from Pambula

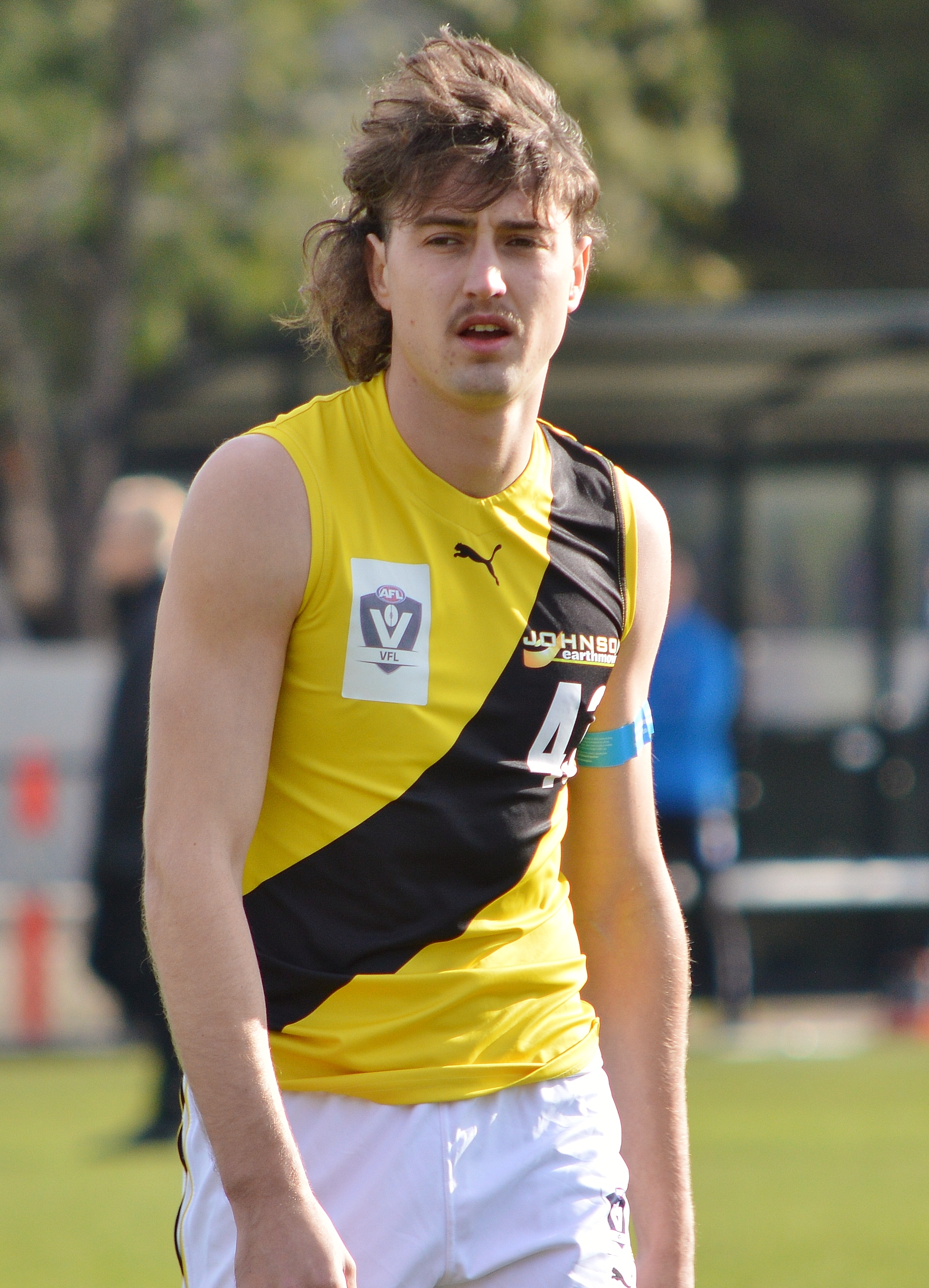
Jacob Bauer is from Wollondilly Shire in Greater Western Sydney

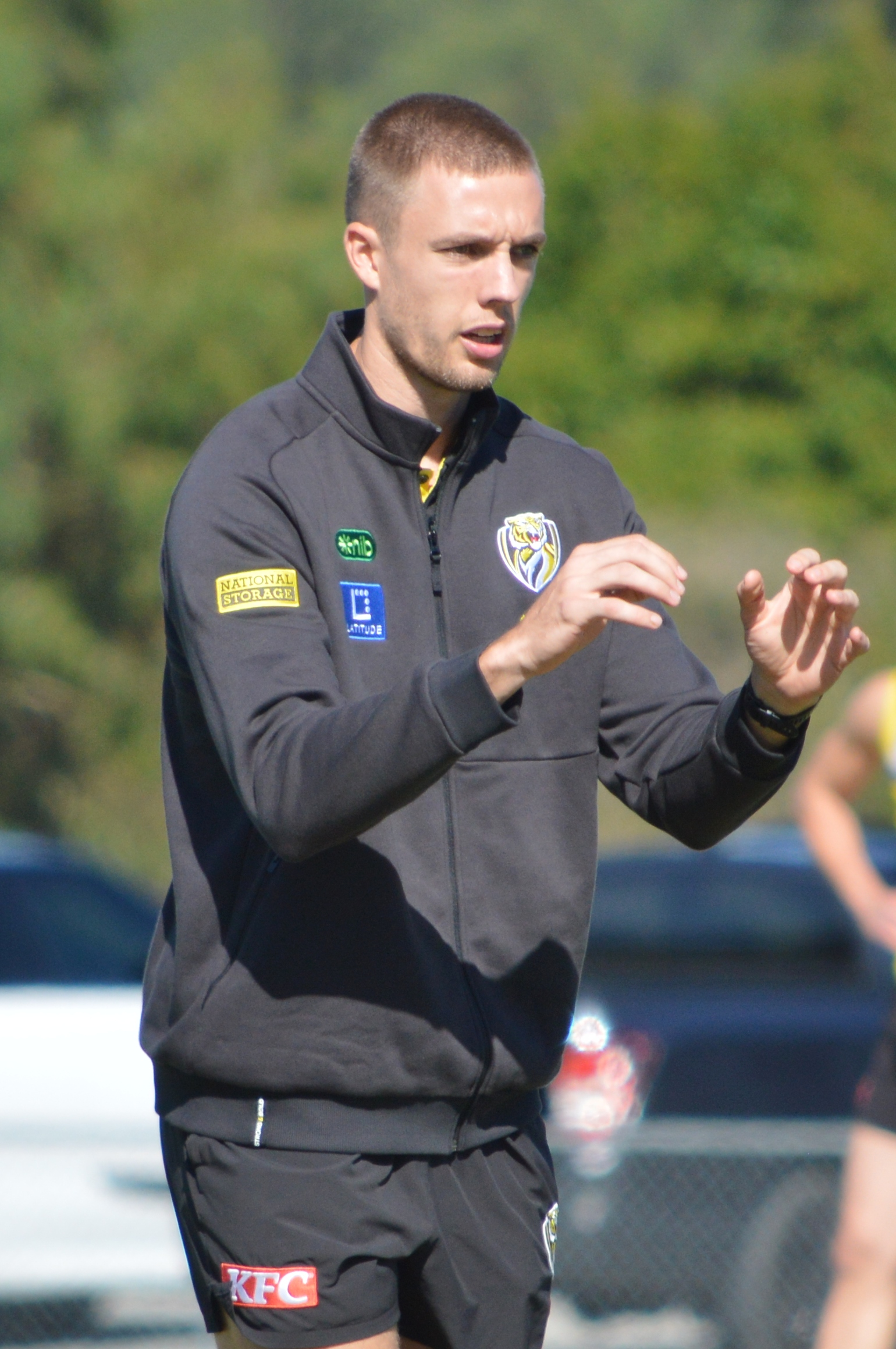
Tylar Young is from Albury

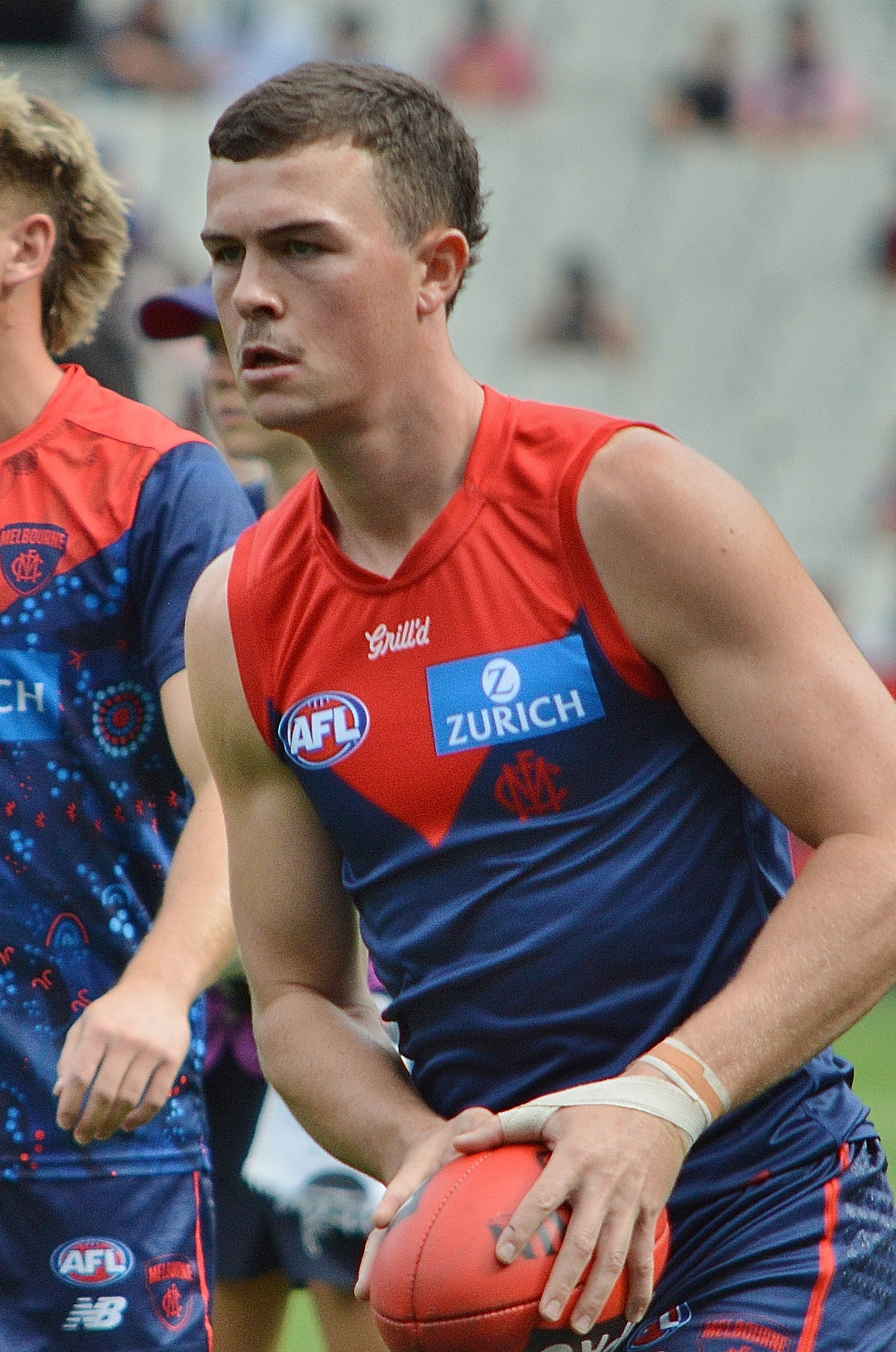
Daniel Turner is from Albury

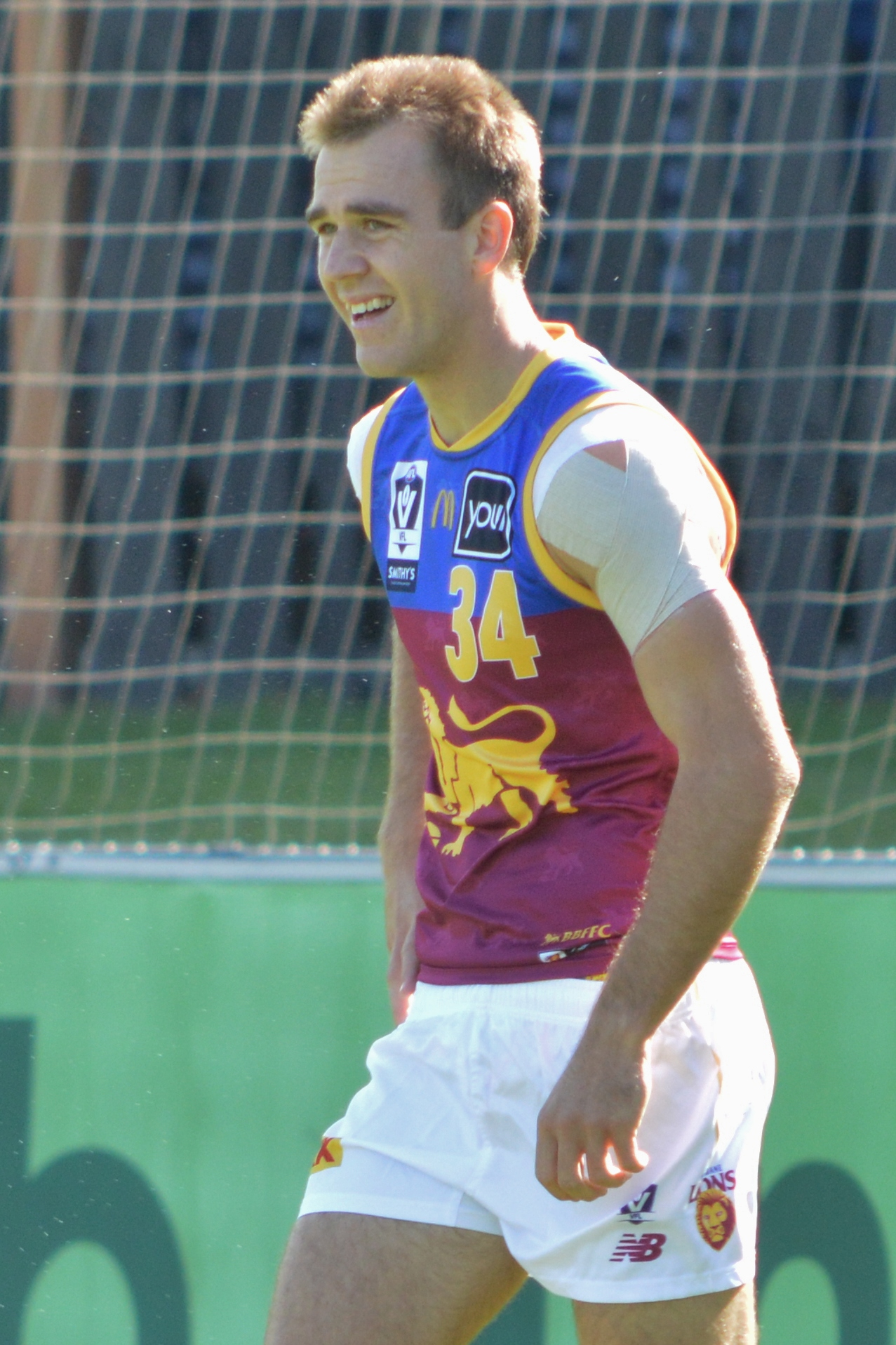
Shadeau Brain is from Finley

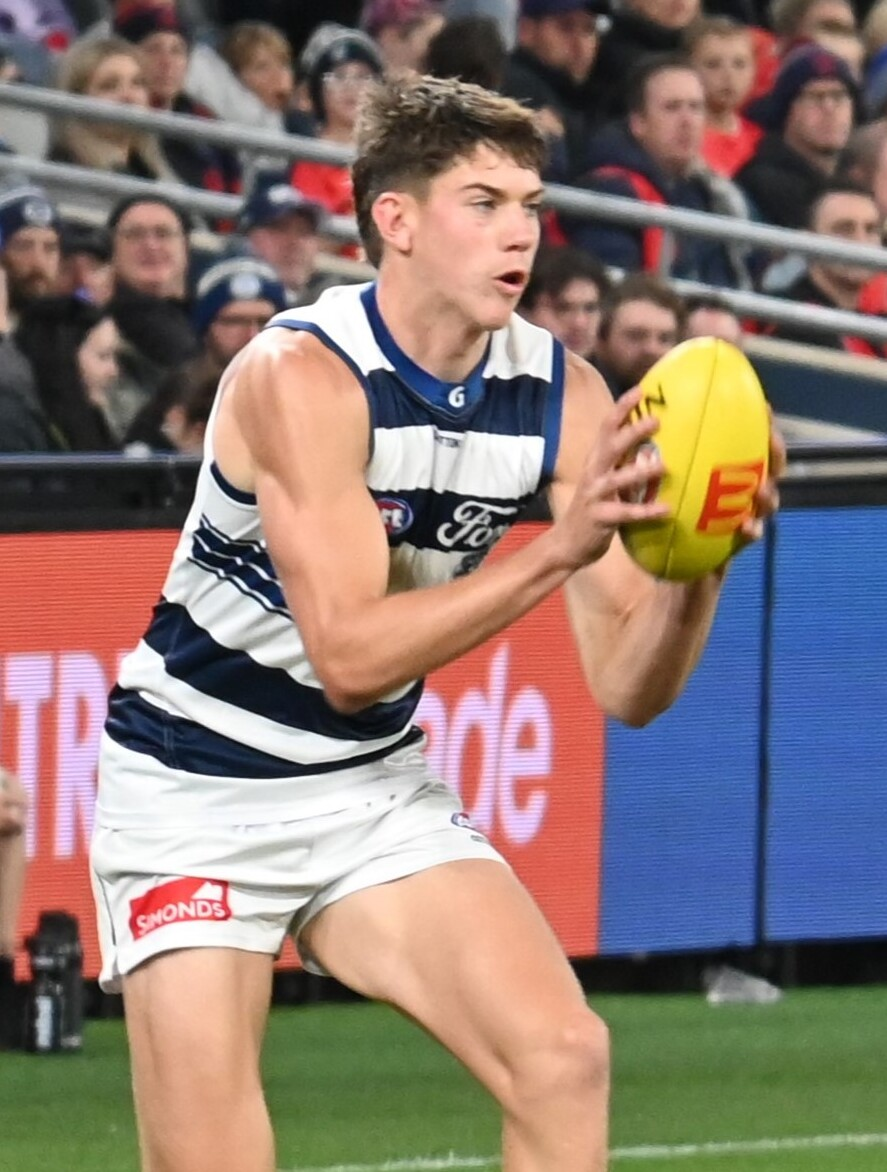
Connor O'Sullivan is from Albury

==== AFL players from NSW ====
Currently on an AFL senior list

Player	NSW junior/senior club/s	Representative honours	AFL Draft	Pick	AFL Years	AFL Games	AFL (Goals)	Connections to NSW, Notes & References
Harry Dean	Lavington		2025 AFL draft	#3	2026–	1	1	Recruited from Albury
Ewan Mackinlay	Holbrook, Lavington		2025 mid-season	(rookie #11)	2025–	1	1	Raised in Holbrook, recruited from Albury
Jobe Shanahan	Moama		2024	#30	2025–	9	12	Raised in Moama
Nicholas Madden	Osborne Football Club, GWS Giants Academy, Greater Western Sydney		2022 (rookie)	Rookie (Category B)	2025–	3	0	Raised in Osborne
Josaia Delana	Kellyville Magpies, GWS Giants Academy, Greater Western Sydney		2024 (rookie)	Rookie (Category B)	2025–	3	0	Born and raised in Western Sydney
Riley Bice	Albury, GWS Giants Academy, Sydney		2024	#41	2025–	11	2	Raised in Albury
Aidan Johnson	Lavington		2024	#68	2025–	4	2	Raised in Albury
Caiden Cleary	Glebe Juniors, Trinity Grammar, Newtown Swans, Sydney University, Sydney Swans Academy, Sydney		2023	#24	2024–	3	1	Raised in Sydney
Shadeau Brain	Finley		2023	Rookie (Category B)	2024–	8	0	Raised in Finley
Connor O'Sullivan	St Patricks Junior, Thurgoona, Albury	U17 (NSW-ACT)	2023	#11	2024–	1	0	Raised in Albury
Patrick Voss	Turvey Park, GWS Giants Academy		2023 (Preseason)		2024–	3	2	Raised in Wagga
Harvey Thomas	Turvey Park, GWS Giants Academy, Greater Western Sydney		2023	#59	2024–	1	0	Raised in Wagga
Lachlan McAndrew	Manly-Warringah, St Augustine's College, Sydney Swans Academy, Sydney Swans reserves, Sydney		2021 (Mid Season rookie)	Rookie (#12)	2023–	2	0	Raised in Sydney
Marc Sheather	Killarney Vale, Pennant Hills, Sydney Swans Academy, Sydney		2020 (Rookie)	Category B Rookie	2023–	2	1	Raised in Forresters Beach, Central Coast
Jacob Bauer	Wollondilly Redbacks (U12), Western Suburbs (U17), Inner West Magpies, Sydney Swans Academy		2022 (Mid Season rookie)	Rookie (#10)	2023–	1	0	Raised in South Western Sydney
Harry Rowston	Griffith, GWS Giants Academy, Greater Western Sydney		2022	#16	2023–	1	0	Raised in Binya and Griffith
Tylar Young	North Albury		2022 (Rookie)	Rookie (#26)	2023–	1	0	Raised in Albury
Campbell Chesser	Lavington		2022	#14	2023–	1	0	Raised in Albury (Lavington)
Patrick Parnell	Albury, NSW/ACT Rams, GWS Giants Academy	U16 (2018)	2021	Rookie (mid-season)	2022–	17	0	Raised in Albury
Daniel Turner	Albury		2021 (Rookie)	Rookie (#24)	2022–	1	0	Raised in Albury
Errol Gulden	Maroubra Saints, Sydney Swans Academy, UNSW-Easts, Sydney	U16 (2018)	2020	#32	2021–	40	32	Born, raised in and recruited from Sydney
Braeden Campbell	Westbrook, Pennant Hills, Sydney Swans Academy, Sydney		2020	#5	2021–	22	3	Raised in and recruited from Sydney
Alex Davies	–		2020	Pre-draft selection	2021–	18	8	Born in Wollongong
James Peatling	Pennant Hills, GWS Giants Academy, GWS Giants (VFL), Greater Western Sydney				2021–	29	10	Raised in Western Sydney
Cooper Sharman	Leeton-Whitton, GWS Giants Academy			Rookie	2021–	15	13	Raised in Leeton
Kieren Briggs	Pennant Hills, GWS Giants Academy, Greater Western Sydney		2018	#34	2021–	9	3	Raised in Sydney
Samson Ryan	Merimbula, Pambula		2020	#40	2021–	1	0	Raised in Pambula
Nick Murray	Henty, Ganmain-Grong Grong Matong, GWS Giants Academy		2021 (Pre season)		2021–	29	1	Raised in Henty and Albury
Matt Rowell	–		2019	#1	2020–	42	10	Born in Sydney
Luke Parks	St Ives, North Shore, Sydney Swans Academy		2020 (Rookie)	Rookie (#8)	2020–2021	6	0	Raised in St Ives (Sydney) and recruited from Sydney
Sam Wicks	Manly Bombers Junior, Sydney Swans Academy, Manly Warringah Wolves/Giants, Sydney		2018 (Rookie)	Category B Rookie	2019–	59	42	Born and raised in and recruited from Manly (Sydney)
Nick Blakey	East Sydney Bulldogs, Sydney Swans Academy, UNSW-Easts, Sydney		2018	#10	2019–	105	33	Raised in and recruited from Sydney
Lachie Schultz	Moama		2018	#57	2019–	108	123	Raised in Moama
Tarryn Thomas	–		2018	#8	2019–2023	69	56	Born and raised in Sydney (Kamilaroi)
Jacob Koschitzke	Albury, Albury High School, GWS Giants Academy		2018	#53	2019–	36	45	Born, raised in and recruited from Albury
James Bell	Shellharbour Swans Junior, Sydney Swans Academy, UNSW-Easts, Sydney		2017	Category B Rookie	2019–	28	10	Born, raised in and recruited from Shellharbour
Liam Stocker	–		2018	#19	2019–	28	2	Born in Sydney (Camperdown)
Zach Sproule	Albury, NSW/ACT Rams, GWS Giants Academy, Greater Western Sydney		2016	Category B Rookie	2019–2022	17	13	Raised in Albury
Jarrod Brander	Wentworth District, GWS Giants Academy, Greater Western Sydney		2017	#13	2019–2022	27	9	Raised in Wentworth
Michael Gibbons	Coolamon, Lavington			Rookie	2019–2021	3	2	Raised in Albury
Doulton Langlands	North Albury			Rookie	2019–2020	47	35	Raised in Lavington
Derek Eggmolesse-Smith	Wentworth		2018 (Rookie)	Rookie	2018–2021	9	0	Raised in Wentworth (Barkandji)
Elliott Himmelberg	–		2016	#51	2018–	41	41	Raised in Wagga
Charlie Spargo	Albury, GWS Giants Academy		2017	#29	2018–	83	52	Born, raised in and recruited from Albury
Esava Ratugolea	–		2016	#43	2018–	59	38	Born and raised in Griffith
Nick Shipley	Camden Junior, Kellyville Rouse Hill, St George, GWS Giants Academy, Greater Western Sydney		2017	#65	2018–2021	6	0	Born and raised in Campbelltown and Macarthur
Josh Dunkley	–		2015	#25	2017–	140	67	Born in Sydney
Jack Buckley	Maroubra Saints, UNSW-Easts, Sydney Swans Academy, Greater Western Sydney		2017	Category B Rookie	2017–	15	0	Born, raised in and recruited from Sydney
Harry Perryman	Collingullie-Glenfield Park, NSW/ACT Rams, GWS Giants Academy, Greater Western Sydney		2016	#14	2017–	124	28	Born, raised in Collingullie and recruited from Sydney
Isaac Cumming	North Broken Hill, GWS Giants Academy, Greater Western Sydney		2016	#20	2017–	23	1	Raised in Broken Hill
Todd Marshall	Deniliquin, GWS Giants Academy		2016	#16	2017–	111	158	Raised in Deniliquin
Jamaine Jones	–		2016	#48	2017–2024	66	23	Born in Broken Hill (Barkindji)
Will Setterfield	Albury, Scots School Albury, GWS Giants Academy, Greater Western Sydney		2016	#5	2017–	36	10	Raised in Albury
Max Lynch	Jindera, Albury		2017 (Rookie)	Rookie (#15)	2017–	10	4	Raised in Jindera and Albury
Ryan Garthwaite	Lavington, Corowa-Rutherglen		2016	#72	2017–2021	14	0	Raised in Corowa
Ben Davis	UNSW-Easts, Sydney Swans Academy		2016	#75	2017–2022	11	1	Raised in and recruited from Sydney
Jake Stein	St Dominic's College Penrith, Greater Western Sydney		2016	Category B Rookie	2017–2022	20	1	Born, raised in and recruited from Penrith (Sydney)
Harry Himmelberg	Mangoplah, NSW/ACT Rams, Greater Western Sydney		2015	#16	2016–	152	161	Born and raised in Wagga Wagga
Daniel Lloyd	Kilarney Vale, Greater Western Sydney		2016 (Rookie)	Rookie (#26)	2016–2023	101	75	Raised in and recruited from Central Coast
Callum Mills	Mosman Swans, Sydney Swans Academy, North Shore, Sydney	U18 (2014, 2015)	2015	#3	2016–	155	27	Born, raised in and recruited from Sydney
Matthew Kennedy	Collingullie-Glenfield Park, NSW/ACT Rams, GWS Giants Academy, Greater Western Sydney		2015	#13	2016–	110	53	Raised in Collingullie, recruited from Sydney
Jacob Hopper	Leeton-Whitton, GWS Giants Academy, Greater Western Sydney		2015	#7	2016–	114	42	Born and raised in Leeton, recruited from Sydney
Matt Flynn	Narrandera, NSW/ACT Rams, GWS Giants Academy, Greater Western Sydney		2015	#41	2016–	24	9	Raised in Narrandera and recruited from Sydney
Paul Hunter	Warners Bay		2016	Rookie (#13)	2016–2021	7	1	Raised in Redhead
Isaac Heeney	Cardiff, Sydney Swans Academy, Sydney		2014	#18	2015–	197	252	Born in Maitland, raised in Newcastle, recruited from Sydney
Jeremy Finlayson	Culcairn, Sydney Hills, NSW/ACT Rams, GWS Giants Academy, Greater Western Sydney		2014	#69	2015–	117	160	Born in Jindera, raised in Culcairn, recruited from Sydney (Yorta Yorta)
Dougal Howard	East Wagga Kooringal, Wagga Tigers		2014	#56	2015–	102	15	Born and raised in Wagga Wagga
Aaron vandenBerg	Tathra		2015 (Rookie)	Rookie (#2)	2015–2021	47	23	Raised in Tathra
Jordan Foote	UNSW-Easts, Sydney				2015–2018	6	1	Raised in Tathra
Jack Hiscox	Sydney University, Sydney				2015–2016	1	0	Raised in Sydney
Sam Naismith	Gunnedah, Sydney Swans Academy, North Shore, Sydney		2013 (Rookie)	Rookie (#59)	2014–2024	33	3	Born in Narrabri, raised in Gunnedah, recruited from Sydney
Sam Lloyd	Deniliquin		2013	#66	2014–2020	89	114	Raised in and recruited from Deniliquin
Jake Barrett	Temora, NSW/ACT Rams, Greater Western Sydney		2013	#97	2014–2018	23	19	Raised in and recruited from Temora
Dane Rampe	UNSW-Easts, University of New South Wales, Sydney		2013 (Rookie)	Rookie (#37)	2013–	251	9	Born, raised in and recruited from Sydney
Zac Williams	Narrandera, NSW/ACT Rams, GWS Giants Academy, Greater Western Sydney		2013 (Rookie)	Rookie (#55)	2013–	151	46	Born, raised in Normanhurst (Sydney), recruited from Sydney
Dan Robinson	NSW/ACT Rams, St Ignatius College, Riverview, Sydney		2013 (Rookie)	Rookie (#51)	2013–2018	25	6	Raised in Sydney
Brandon Jack	Westbrook Junior, Pennant Hills, Sydney		2013 Rookie	Rookie (#58)	2013–2017	28	16	Raised in Sydney
Jarrod Witts	St Ives, Sydney University		2011	#67	2012–	178	38	Born, raised in and recruited from Sydney
Harry Cunningham	Turvey Park, NSW/ACT Rams, Sydney		2012 (Rookie)	Rookie (#93)	2012–	197	52	Born, raised in and recruited from Wagga Wagga
Michael Hartley	Penrith, Sydney University		2012 (Rookie)	Rookie (#87)	2012–2021	49	2	Born, raised in Sydney (Penrith)
Anthony Miles	Howlong, NSW/ACT Rams, Greater Western Sydney			Zone	2012–2020	88	31	Born in Albury, raised in and recruited from Howlong (Albury)
Jacob Townsend	Leeton-Whitton, NSW/ACT Rams, GWS Giants Academy, Greater Western Sydney	U16, U18 (2010)		Zone	2012–2021	62	44	Born and raised in Leeton
Kurt Aylett	Leeton-Whitton, Greater Western Sydney			Zone	2012–2015	3	0	Born and raised in Leeton
Luke Breust	Temora, NSW/ACT Rams		2009 (Rookie)	Rookie (#47)	2011–2025	308	553	Born, raised in and recruited from Temora
Will Langford	East Sydney Bulldogs, UNSW-Eastern Suburbs Bulldogs		2011 (Rookie)	Rookie (#85)	2011–2018	72	24	Born and raised in Sydney
Jeremy McGovern	-		2011 (Rookie)	Rookie (#44)	2011–2015	197	38	Born in Sydney
Nathan Gordon	Baulkham Hills, East Coast Eagles, Sydney		2010 (Rookie)	Rookie (#71)	2011–2015	23	19	Raised in Sydney
Isaac Smith	Wagga Hawks, Wagga Tigers, Albury, NSW/ACT Rams		2010	#19	2011–2023	280	205	Born in Young, raised in Cootamundra and Wagga Wagga
Tom Young	Camden Cats, Campbelltown, Sydney University, NSW/ACT Rams	U18 (2009)	2010	#104 (NSW Scholarship list)	2011–2014	28	5	Raised in and recruited from Sydney
Jackson Ferguson	Pennant Hills		2011 (Rookie)	Rookie (#72)	2011–2013	1	0	Raised in and recruited from Sydney
Taylor Duryea	NSW/ACT Rams		2009	#69	2010–2025	219	25	Raised in Corowa
Dustin Martin	Ingleburn Magpies Junior, Campbelltown		2009	#3	2010–2024	302	338	Raised in Sydney
Taylor Walker	North Broken Hill, NSW/ACT Rams		2007	#75	2009–2026	319	715	Born, raised in and recruited from Broken Hill
Nic Naitanui	–		2008	#2	2009–2023	213	112	Born in Penrith
Ryan Davis	Willoughby Wildcats, North Shore Bombers, NSW/ACT Rams		2008	#62	2008–2017	35	19	Raised in Sydney
Tony Armstrong	Brocklesby-Burrumbuttock, NSW/ACT Rams, Sydney		2007	#58	2008–2015	35	2	Born and raised in Albury (Barranbinya)
Craig Bird	NSW/ACT Rams, Nelson Bay, Sydney	NSW/ACT U18 (2007)	2007	#59	2008–2017	157	59	Raised in Nelson Bay
Tom Hawkins	Finley		2006	#41 (father-son)	2007–	359	796	Born and raised in Finley
Kieren Jack	Pennant Hills, Sydney	NSW/ACT U18 (2005)	2005 Rookie	Rookie	2007–2019	256	166	Born and raised in Sydney
Matt Suckling	East Wagga-Kooringal, Wagga Tigers		2007 (Rookie)	Rookie (#22)	2007–2020	178	85	Raised in Wagga Wagga
Ed Barlow		U15 (2006)	2006 (Rookie)	Rookie (#60)	2007–2011	34	22	Raised in Tathra
Bryce Campbell	Wagga Tigers		2006	#7	2007–2008	8	1	Raised in Wagga
Malcolm Lynch	Saint Ignatius College				2007	2	0	Schooled in Sydney
Ben McGlynn	Wenworth, Sydney		2006	(Rookie)	2006–2016	171	195	Raised in Wentworth
Dylan Addison	St George, Greater Western Sydney	U18 (2005)	2005	#27	2006–2015	93	30	Raised in Sydney
Sam Gilbert	–		2005	#33	2006–2018	208	38	Raised in Terranora
Setanta Ó hAilpín	–		2011	#79	2005–2013	88	82	Born in Sydney
Daniel Pratt	–		2000	#42	2004–2011	119	10	Born in Sydney
Jarrad McVeigh	Killarney Vale, Pennant Hills, NSW/ACT Rams, Sydney		2002	#5	2003–2019	325	201	Born and raised on the Central Coast
Brent Staker	West Broken Hill, NSW/ACT Rams		2002	#37	2003–2015	160	119	Born and raised in Broken Hill
Adam Schneider	Osborne, NSW/ACT Rams, Sydney		2001	#60	2003–2014	228	259	Born in Wagga, raised in and recruited from Osborne
Lewis Roberts-Thomson	North Shore, NSW/ACT Rams, Sydney		2001	#29	2003–2014	179	54	Raised in Sydney
Paul Bevan	Western Suburbs, NSW/ACT Rams, Sydney		2003 Rookie draft	Rookie (#64)	2003–2011	129	39	Raised in Central Coast and Sydney
Henry Playfair	Holbrook, North Shore, NSW/ACT Rams, Sydney		2001	#41	2003–2010	68	43	Born and raised in Holbrook
Daniel Cross	St Patricks Junior, Albury High School, Albury		2000	#56	2002–2015	249	34	Raised in Albury
Chris Hyde	Barooga				2002–2008	93	39	Raised in and recruited from Barooga
Aaron Rogers	St George, NSW/ACT Rams, Sydney		2001	#26	2002–2004	2	0	Born, raised in and recruited from Sydney
Justin Koschitzke	Brocklesby		2000	#2	2001–2013	200	247	Born and raised in Albury
Stuart Bown	West Broken Hill				2001	4	1	Born and raised in Broken Hill
Mark Hilton	North Albury				2001	1	0	Raised in and recruited from Albury
Aaron Henneman	Corowa				2000–2006	58	5	Raised in and recruited from Corowa
Ben Fixter	Ungarie, Wagga Tigers, NSW/ACT Rams, Sydney		1999	#6	2000–2005	54	11	Raised in Ungarie
Lenny Hayes	Pennant Hills, NSW/ACT Rams		1998	#11	1999–2014	297	95	Born, raised in and recruited from Sydney
Mark McVeigh	Killarney Vale, Pennant Hills, NSW/ACT Rams		1998	#9	1999–2012	232	107	Raised on the Central Coast and Sydney
Brett Kirk	North Albury, Sydney			Rookie	1999–2010	241	96	Born and raised in Albury
Nick Davis	Ramsgate, St George, NSW/ACT Rams, Sydney		1998	#19	1999–2008	168	235	Raised in and recruited from Sydney
Ray Hall	Balmain, Woy Woy, NSW/ACT Rams				1999–2007	99	28	Raised in Sydney
Ben Hollands	North Albury				1999	8	5	Raised in and recruited from Albury
Mark Alvey	–				1998–2005	59	31	Raised in Curlwaa
Adam Chatfield	Pennant Hills	U17 (1997)	1997	#23	1998–2001	1	0	Raised in Sydney
Cameron Mooney	Turvey Park, NSW/ACT Rams		1996	#56	1997–2017	221	297	Born and raised in Wagga
Josh Wooden	Lockhart, NSW/ACT Rams		1997	#24	1997–2007	96	18	Raised in Lockhart
Adam Houlihan	Corowa				1997–2004	94	99	Recruited from Corowa
Stefan Carey	Pennant Hills, Sydney	U17 (1993)			1996–2000	48	23	Raised in Sydney
Leo Barry	Deniliquin, Sydney	U17 (1993)	1994	Zone selection	1995–2009	237	56	Born and raised in Deniliquin
Justin Crawford	Tocumwal, Sydney	U17 (1993)	1994	Zone selection	1995–1998	46	32	Born and raised in Finley
Nigel Lappin	–		1993	#2	1994–2008	279	174	Born in Corowa
Brett Cook	Central Broken Hill				1994–1999	43	12	Raised in Broken Hill
Tim Hargreaves	Berrigan				1994–1998	62	69	Raised in Berrigan
Damian Lang	Leeton, Sydney				1994–1998	8	5	Raised in and recruited from Leeton
Andrew Bomford	North Shore, Sydney		1994	Pre Season (#22)	1994–1996	28	9	Raised in Sydney
Peter Green	Barellan				1994	1	0	Raised in Barellan
Greg Stafford	Western Suburbs, Sydney				1993–2006	204	141	Raised in Sydney (Ashbury)
Nathon Irvin	Mangoplah				1993	1	0	Raised in Mangoplah
Shane Crawford	Finley	1993	1991	#13	1992–2008	305	224	Raised in Finley
Ben Doolan	Albury, Sydney				1991–1999	101	11	Raised in and recruited from Albury
Darren Holmes (footballer)	Lavington, Sydney				1991–1996	63	9	Raised in and recruited from Albury
Neil Brunton	Holroyd-Parramatta, Sydney	1992, 1993			1991–1995	71	10	Raised in Sydney
Jamie Lawson	Wentworth, Sydney	1992, 1993			1991–1995	61	29	Raised in Wentworth
Paul Kelly	Wagga Tigers, Sydney	1992, 1993			1990–2002	234	200	Born in West Wyalong, raised in Wagga
Brett Hungerford	Tooleybuc				1990	2	0	Raised in Tooleybuc
Wayne Carey	North Wagga	1990, 1993 (c)			1989–2004	272	727	Born and raised in Wagga
John Longmire	Corowa-Rutherglen				1988–1999	200	511	Born, raised in and recruited from Corowa
David Willis	Henty, Sydney				1988–1991	25	3	Raised in and recruited from Henty
Michael Kennedy	Queanbeyan				1988–1990	23	3	Raised in and recruited from Queanbeyan
David Brown	Pennant Hills				1988–1990	12	18	Raised in Sydney
John Brinkkotter	Barooga		1986	#10	1988–1989	5	1	Raised in and recruited from Barooga
Gerard Butts	North Albury				1988–1989	3	0	Raised in and recruited from Albury
Chris Daniher	Ungarie, Ariah Park-Mirrool, Coolamon	1988, 1990, 1993			1987–1997	124	40	Born and raised in West Wyalong
Leon Higgins	Tocumwal				1987–1996	122	80	Raised in and recruited from Tocumwal
Darren Bennett	–		1988	#13	1987–1993	78	305	Born in Sydney
Matt Lloyd	Mangoplah – Cookardinia United, Sydney				1987–1991	22	5	Raised in Mangoplah and Wagga
Peter Baldwin	Finley				1987–1990	5	1	Raised in Finley
Chris Duthy	South Broken Hill		1986	#37	1987	3	0	Raised in Broken Hill
Billy Brownless	Jerilderie	1998–1992, 1993			1986–1997	198	441	Born and raised in Jerilderie
Michael Gayfer	Corowa-Rutherglen	1993			1986–1993	142	1	Raised in Corowa
Grant Bartholomaeus	Forbes	1988			1986–1997	4	0	Raised in Forbes
Robert Caprioli	North Broken Hill, St George, Sydney	U17 (1984)			1986	1	0	Raised in Broken Hill
Graham Jones	Western Suburbs, Sydney				1986	1	0	Raised in and recruited from Sydney
Mark Roberts	St George, Sydney				1985–1999	202	169	Raised in and recruited from Sydney
Paul Spargo	Albury				1985–1993	90	118	Raised in and recruited from Albury
Rudy Yonson	North Albury				1985	3	3	Raised in and recruited from Albury
Hilton Kotzur	Walbundrie, Sydney				1985	1	0	Raised in and recruited from Walbundrie
Russell Morris	North Shore	1990, 1993			1984–1994	159	84	Recruited from Sydney
David Murphy	Finley, Wagga Tigers	1988, 1993			1984–1993	90	118	Born, raised in Finley and recruited from Wagga
David Honybun	Coleambally	1988			1984–1992	60	41	Raised and recruited from Coleambally
Paul Hawke	Wagga Tigers, Sydney	1988			1984–1991	114	102	Born in, raised and recruited from Wagga
Arthur Chilcott	Western Suburbs, Sydney				1984–1985	13	14	Raised in Illawarra, recruited from Sydney
Tony Hughes	Albury, Sydney				1984–1985	6	2	Raised in and recruited from Albury
Robb Hawkins	Finley				1984	3	0	Raised in Finley
Darren Jackson	Finley				1984	2	1	Raised in Finley
Peter Densley	Scots School Albury				1984	11	4	Recruited from Albury
Brian Winton	Wentworth				1983	47	11	Raised in and recruited from Wentworth
Jack Lucas	Ariah Park Mirool, Sydney				1982–1984	19	18	Raised in and recruited from Ariah Park
Simon O'Donnell					1982–1983	24	18	Born in Deniliquin
Anthony Daniher	Ungarie, Turvey Park, Sydney	1988, 1990, 1992, 1993			1981–1994	233	80	Born and raised in West Wyalong
Dennis Carroll	Albury, Sydney	1988, 1992			1981–1993	219	117	Born and raised in Ganmain
Darryl Henderson	Corowa, Sydney				1981–1983	14	0	Recruited from Corowa
Glenn Coleman	Southern Districts, Sydney	1988, 1992, 1993			1980–1993	194	115	Raised in Sydney
Andy Bennett	Central Broken Hill				1980–1985	35	19	Born and raised in Broken Hill
Stephen Eather	Turvey Park				1980–1981	5	0	Raised in and recruited from Albury
Victor Hugo	Narrandera				1980	2	0	Raised in and recruited from Narrandera
Robert Anderson	Queanbeyan				1980–1984	16	6	Recruited from Queanbeyan
Neale Daniher	Ungarie	1990			1979–1990	82	32	Born and raised in West Wyalong
Wayne Carroll	Ganmain, Queanbeyan, Mangoplah				1979–1985	56	57	Raised in Ganmain
Max Kruse, Sydney	Leeton				1979–1985	88	32	Raised in and recruited from Leeton
John Durnan	Narrandera				1979–1982	22	2	Raised in and recruited from Narrandera
Kim Kershaw	Wagga Tigers				1979–1982	9	0	Raised in and recruited from Wagga
Mark Fraser	Turvey Park				1979–1981	20	1	Raised in and recruited from Wagga
Phil Bradmore	North Shore				1978–1981	15	17	Raised in and recruited from Sydney
Russell Campbell	Ganmain				1978–1980	4	3	Raised in and recruited from Ganmain
Mick Byrne	North Shore	1988			1977–1989	161	150	Raised in and recruited from Sydney
Wayne Evans	Grong Grong Matong				1977	11	7	Recruited from Matong
Terry Daniher	Ungarie, Ariah Park-Mirrool	1983, 1984, 1986, 1988, 1989, 1990, 1992, 1993			1976–1992	313	469	Born and raised in West Wyalong
Gary Gray	Albury				1976	2	0	Raised in Albury
Colin Hounsell	Collingullie, Sydney				1975–1985	122	98	Born and raised in Wagga, recruited from Collingullie
Terry O'Neill	Narrandera				1975–1983	101	15	Born raised in and recruited from Narrandera
Rod Coelli	Ardlethan				1975	3	0	Raised in Ardlethan
Mark Maclure	East Sydney				1974–1986	243	327	Raised in and recruited from Sydney as teenager
Peter Doyle	Berrigan				1974–1978	38	15	Raised in and recruited from Berrigan
Jack Hawkins	Finley				1973–1981	182	20	Recruited from Finley
Michael Hawkins	Finley				1973	2	0	Raised in Finley
Christopher Lynch	North Broken Hill				1972–1974	5	2	Born, raised in and recruited from Broken Hill
Steve Hywood	South Broken Hill				1972	13	0	Raised in and recruited from Broken Hill
Neil Brown	Albury				1972	2	0	Raised in Albury
Col Anderson	Mulwala				1972	2	0	Raised in Mulwala
Ross Henshaw	North Albury				1971–1983	167	11	Raised in and recruited from Albury
Phil Baker	Finley				1971–1979	106	125	Raised in Albury
Trevor Carrodus	Lockhart				1971–1972	3	3	Raised in Lockhart
Frank Gumbleton	Ganmain				1970–1979	147	19	Born, raised in and recruited from Ganmain
Reg Gleeson	Osborne				1970–1976	128	11	Born and raised in Albury
John Pitura	Wagga Tigers				1969–1977	139	95	Born, raised in and recruited from Wagga
John Duthie	Albury				1969–1972	11	5	Raised in and recruited from Albury
Lindsay Jacob	Walla Walla, Corowa				1969	2	2	Raised in Walla Walla
Peter Chisnall	–				1968–1976	80	14	Raised in Corowa
George Lakes	West Broken Hill				1968–1972	55	22	Recruited from Broken Hill
Ross Elwin	Leeton				1968–1970	10	6	Recruited from Leeton
Greg Lambert	Corowa				1966–1979	167	22	Recruited from Corowa
Terry Leahy	North Albury				1966–1970	65	17	Recruited from Albury
Barry Richardson	–				1965–1974	125	134	Born in Albury
Geoff Strang	Albury				1965–1971	88	0	Raised in Albury
John Perry	–				1964–1974	83	27	Born in Albury
Mick Dowdle	Jerilderie				1964–1971	98	89	Raised in and recruited from Jerilderie
Robert Longmire	Corowa				1964	2	0	Raised in and recruited from Corowa
Barry Fitzgerald	Sydney Naval Depot				1963–1965	35	4	Recruited from Sydney
Geoff Doubleday	North Albury				1963	1	0	Raised in and recruited from Albury
Ron Birch	Wagga Tigers				1963	1	0	Raised in Wagga
Neville Forge	Walla Walla, Albury				1962	2	0	Raised in Walla Walla
Tom Carroll	Ganmain				1961–1963	55	143	Born and raised in Ganmain
Jim Carroll	Ganmain				1961–1962	2	2	Raised in Ganmain
John Leady	North Albury				1961	2	0	Raised in and recruited from Albury
Brian Leahy	North Albury				1960–1965	79	2	Raised in and recruited from Albury
John Fox	Marrar				1960–1965	60	7	Recruited from Marrar
Bob Chisolm	Berrigan				1960–1962	22	20	Raised in Berrigan
Brian Chisholm	Berrigan				1960	12	1	Raised in Berrigan
Des Lyons					1960	2	1	Raised in Barellan
Dick Grimmond	Albury				1959–1964	102	6	Raised in Albury
Phil Gehrig	Moulamein				1959–1960	16	11	Raised in Moulamein
Jim Little	Tooleybuc				1959	7	2	Recruited from Tooleybuc
Doug Clarke	Liverpool				1958–1959	8	7	Raised in Sydney
Bill Box	Whitton				1958	9	4	Born and raised in Whitton
Jim Broockmann	Finley				1958	3	0	Raised in Finley
Terry Ingersoll	Western Suburbs				1957–1958	17	36	Raised in and recruited from Sydney
Bill Clements	Berrigan				1957–1959	14	2	Raised in Berrigan
Bill Byrne	Corowa, Mangoplah				1957	1	0	Raised in Corowa
Vin Bourke	Henty, North Albury				1957	1	0	Born and raised in Henty
Allan Jeans	Finley				1955–1959	77	26	Born, raised in and recruited from Finley
Bill Barton	North Albury				1955–1956	2	2	Raised in Albury
Neil Davies	Balmain, Central Broken Hill				1955	2	1	Born and raised in Broken Hill
Peter Curtis	Coolamon, Griffith, North Albury				1955	2	1	Raised in Coolamon
Bob Henderson	Deniliquin				1953–1962	137	1	Raised in and recruited from Deniliquin
Terry Gleeson	Berrigan				1953–1962	100	27	Raised in Berrigan
Brian Gleeson	Berrigan				1953–1957	70	47	Raised in Berrigan
Ian Egerton	Deniliquin				1953–1957	56	7	Raised in and recruited from Deniliquin
Roger Duffy	Newtown				1952–1958	117	117	Raised in Sydney
Ray Houston	Eastern Suburbs				1952–1955	34	4	Born, raised in and recruited from Sydney
John Harding	East Sydney				1952–1954	27	7	Raised in Sydney
Roy Williams	Queanbeyan				1952	8	7	Raised in and recruited from Queanbeyan
Lance Mann	Albury				1951–1959	80	22	Recruited from Albury
Ray Ednie	Berrigan				1950–1953	56	7	Raised in and recruited from Berrigan
Max Jeffers	Tocumwal				1950	6	5	Raised in and recruited from Tocumwal
Jack Gaffney	Broken Hill YCW, South Broken Hill				1949–1953	80	0	Raised in and recruited from Broken Hill
Alan Stevens	–				1948–1950	22	1	Born and raised in Sydney (Coogee)
Laurie Carroll	Ganmain				1948–1959	11	2	Born and raised in Ganmain
Arthur Hodgson	–				1948–1952	76	7	Born in Sydney
Chris Carroll	St George, Central Broken Hill				1947–1948	13	18	Born and raised in Broken Hill
Allan Strang	Albury, St George				1947–1948	15	17	Born and raised in Albury
Jack Eames	South Albury Juniors				1946	14	1	Born and raised in Albury
Stan Obst	West Albury				1945	2	0	Born and raised in Albury
Bill Wood	Albury, South Sydney				1944–1951	115	294	Raised in Albury, recruited from Sydney
Ron Hall	St George				1944–1947	17	2	Recruited from Sydney
Les Gregory	Albury				1944–1946	2	0	Born in Howlong raised in and recruited from Albury
Kevin Deagan	RAAF Sydney				1944–1946	5	2	Recruited from Sydney
Merv Brooks	–				1943–1944	2	0	Born in Ariah Park
George Withers	Culcairn				1943	2	0	Born in Holbrook
Reg Garvin	Newtown				1942	130	33	Born raised in and recruited from Sydney Surry Hills
Jim Matthews	Albury				1942	6	3	Born in Culcairn, raised in Albury
Ivor Clay	Henty				1941–1946	31	19	Recruited from Henty
Bert Clay	Henty				1940–1951	157	48	Recruited from Henty
Jack Cliff	West Broken Hill				1940–1942	32	8	Raised in Broken Hill
Dom Seymour	Albury				1939	2	0	Born and raised in Albury
Tom Davey	–				1939	2	0	Born and raised in Albury
Jack Lowry	–				1938–1946	53	7	Born in Lambton (Newcastle)
Reg Garvin	Newtown				1937–1946	130	33	Born, raised in (Surry Hills) and recruited from Sydney
Norm McDermott	–				1937–1939	21	13	Born in Albury
Jack Hacker	Oaklands				1937–1944	111	7	Born in New South Wales, recruited from Corowa
Stan Livingstone	Lockhart				1937–1940	16	3	Recruited from Lockhart
Vic Carroll	Corowa				1937	12	2	Raised in Corowa
Perc Bushby	–				1936–1948	142	46	Born in Narrandera
Alf Hacker	Oaklands				1936–1943	24	0	Born in Urana, recruited from Corowa
Bernie Hore	–				1936–1940	60	2	Born and raised in Albury
Tom Ledwidge	–				1936–1938	6	3	Born and raised in Hay
Denis Ryan	Albury Rovers				1935–1939	70	64	Born and raised in Albury
Stan Lloyd	Newtown				1934–1942	117	0	Born in Whitton, raised in and recruited from Sydney
Alby De Luca	–				1934–1936	42	21	Born in Wollongong
Brian Goodhart	North Broken Hill				1934–1935	15	4	Raised in Broken Hill
Colin Braid	South Broken Hill				1934	1	0	Raised in Broken Hill
Alfred Andrew-Street	–				1933–1934	6	0	Born in Sydney (Bondi)
Noel Barnett	West Albury, Albury Rovers, St Patricks Junior				1933	11	2	Born in Holbrook, raised in Albury
Bert Clarke	Albury, Corowa				1933	4	2	Raised in Albury
Colin Strang	East Albury				1933	2	3	Born in Sydney, raised in Albury
Stan Castles	Sydney				1932	2	3	Raised in Sydney
Jack Loes	–				1932	4	0	Born and raised in Tumbarumba
Charlie Kolb	Albury Rovers				1932	3	1	Raised in and recruited from Albury
Ken Bracken	St George				1932	1	0	Raised in Sydney
Haydn Bunton Sr.	Albury Rovers, Albury, West Albury				1931–1942	119	207	Born and raised in Albury
Gordon Strang	Jindera, East Albury				1931–1938	116	108	Born in Sydney (Waverley), raised in Albury
Doug Strang	Albury Rovers, East Albury				1931–1935	64	180	Born in Sydney (Waverley), raised in Albury
Jack Hanson	South Broken Hill				1931–1933	29	0	Born and raised in Broken Hill
Jack Anderson	Balldale				1931–1933	42	46	Raised in Balldale
Alex Clarke	Albury				1931–1933	15	0	Raised in Albury
Jack Hayes	South Sydney	1927, 1930			1931	13	7	Born and raised in and recruited from Sydney
Lionel Hastie	Newtown				1931	13	15	Recruited from Sydney
Alex Fraser	East Albury				1931	3	0	Recruited from Albury
Doug Ayres	Newtown	1927, 1930			1931	1	1	Born and raised in Sydney (Randwick)
Fred Davies	Eastern Suburbs	1927			1930–1934	63	11	Born, raised in and recruited from Sydney
Victor Lucas	Federal				1930	1	0	Recruited from Wagga
Bill Mohr	Royal Stars, Federal				1929–1941	195	735	Born and raised in Wagga
Clarrie Hearn					1929–1935	92	90	Born in Tocumwal
Maurie Hunter	St Patricks Albury				1929–1933	81	159	Raised in and recruited from Albury
Ray Usher	Albury, Eastern Suburbs	1927			1928–1933	82	2	Recruited from Sydney
Jack Haw	Leeton				1928–1929	13	6	Recruited from Leeton
Bob Smith	Newtown	1927			1928	16	0	Born, raised and recruited from Sydney
Bill McDowell	–				1927–1928	11	7	Born in Albury
Bill Donald	Hume Weir				1927	3	0	Recruited from Hume Weir
Frank Bult	East Sydney				1927	20	4	Recruited from Sydney
Tom Everuss	South Broken Hill				1926	17	0	Born, raised in and recruited from Broken Hill
Les Witto	West Broken Hill				1926	6	0	Born, raised in and recruited from Broken Hill
Lindsay Beck	South Broken Hill				1926	2	0	Born, raised in and recruited from Broken Hill
Hope Evans	Albury				1925	7	0	Recruited from Albury
Charlie Whitely	Hume Weir				1925–1926	2	1	Born and raised in Albury
Alby Anderson	Mangoplah, Royal Stars, Wagga United Football Association				1924–1926	14	7	Born and raised in Wagga Wagga
Jim Tarbotton	Railways				1923–1926	37	1	Raised in and recruited from Sydney
Tim Archer	Mangoplah				1923–1924	22	12	Born and raised in Wagga Wagga
Gordon Hislop	Balmain	1922			1923–1924	22	0	Recruited from Sydney
Tom Elliot	Junee Junction				1923–1924	11	2	Recruited from Junee
Syd Hutcheson					1920	11	0	Born in Wagga
Paddy Kelly	Paddington				1920	7	0	Recruited from Sydney
Bob Merrick	East Sydney				1919–1926	59	181	Born and raised in Sydney (Darlinghurst)
Ivor Warne-Smith	–				1919–1932	146	110	Born in Sydney
Chris Laird	Paddington				1918–1922	59	99	Recruited from Sydney
Harry Morgan	–				1914–1921	86	191	Born in Parramatta
Bert Chapman	–				1914	7	1	Born in Sydney
Chris Lethbridge	Y.M.C.A.				1913–1922	148	19	Raised in Wagga and recruited from Sydney
Reg Ellis	Y.M.C.A.	1911, 1924 (c)			1913–1920	53	1	Born and raised in Sydney (Randwick)
Johnny Allan	–				1913	10	2	Born and raised in Albury
Charlie Armstrong	–				1912–1919	45	4	Born and raised in Holbrook
Paddy Abbott	Albury				1911–1917	62	2	Born and raised in Albury
George Anderson	–				1911–1917	104	8	Raised in Wagga Wagga
Clarrie Dall	Redfern				1911–1912	9	9	Recruited from Sydney
Les Frauenfelder	Albury				1910	2	2	Recruited from Albury
Arthur Caldwell	–				1908	8	1	Born in Young
Marshall Herbert	Redfern				1908–10	51	8	Recruited from Sydney
John Stephenson	Balmain				1907	10	0	Recruited from Sydney
Frank Boynton	–				1906–1910	39	14	Raised in Balranald
Harry Lever	–				1905–1922	218	6	Born in Parramatta
Frank Dunne	Albury				1905	1	1	Recruited from Albury
Bill Strang	Albury				1904–1913	69	80	Born in and raised in Albury
Peter McCann					1904–1907	2	0	Born in Blayney
Joe Johnson					1904–1906	55	15	Born in Newcastle
Syd Wright	Albury				1904	3	0	Born in Sydney (Petersham) and raised in Albury
Peter McCann	Albury				1904	2	0	Born in Blayney and raised in Albury
Arthur Percy	Albury				1904	2	0	Born in and raised in Albury
Jock McHale	–				1903–1920	261	18	Born and raised in Sydney (Botany)
Arthur Adamson	–				1902–1903	28	0	Born in Gulgong, recruited from Broken Hill
Stan Watsford	–				1900	2	0	Raised in Albury
Bob Kenny	Sydney				1899	2	0	Raised in Sydney
Harry Lampe					1899–1907	135	57	Born and raised in Wagga
Tommy Ryan					1899–1904	66	71	Born in Sydney
Conrad ten Brink	Albury				1898	12	10	Raised in Albury
Stan Enfield	–				1897	3	3	Born in Sydney

=== Women's ===
==== Current players ====
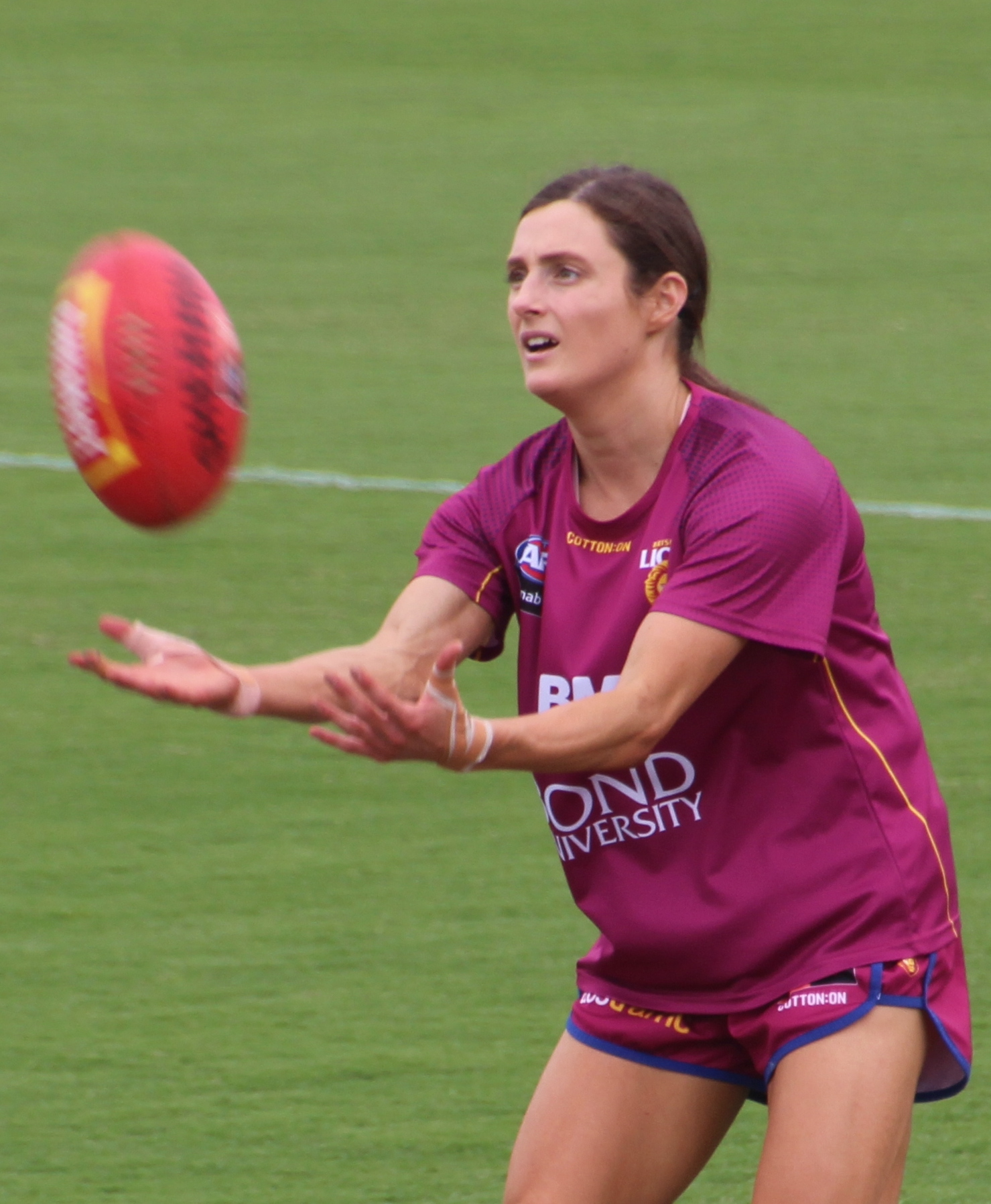
Ruby Svarc is from Corowa

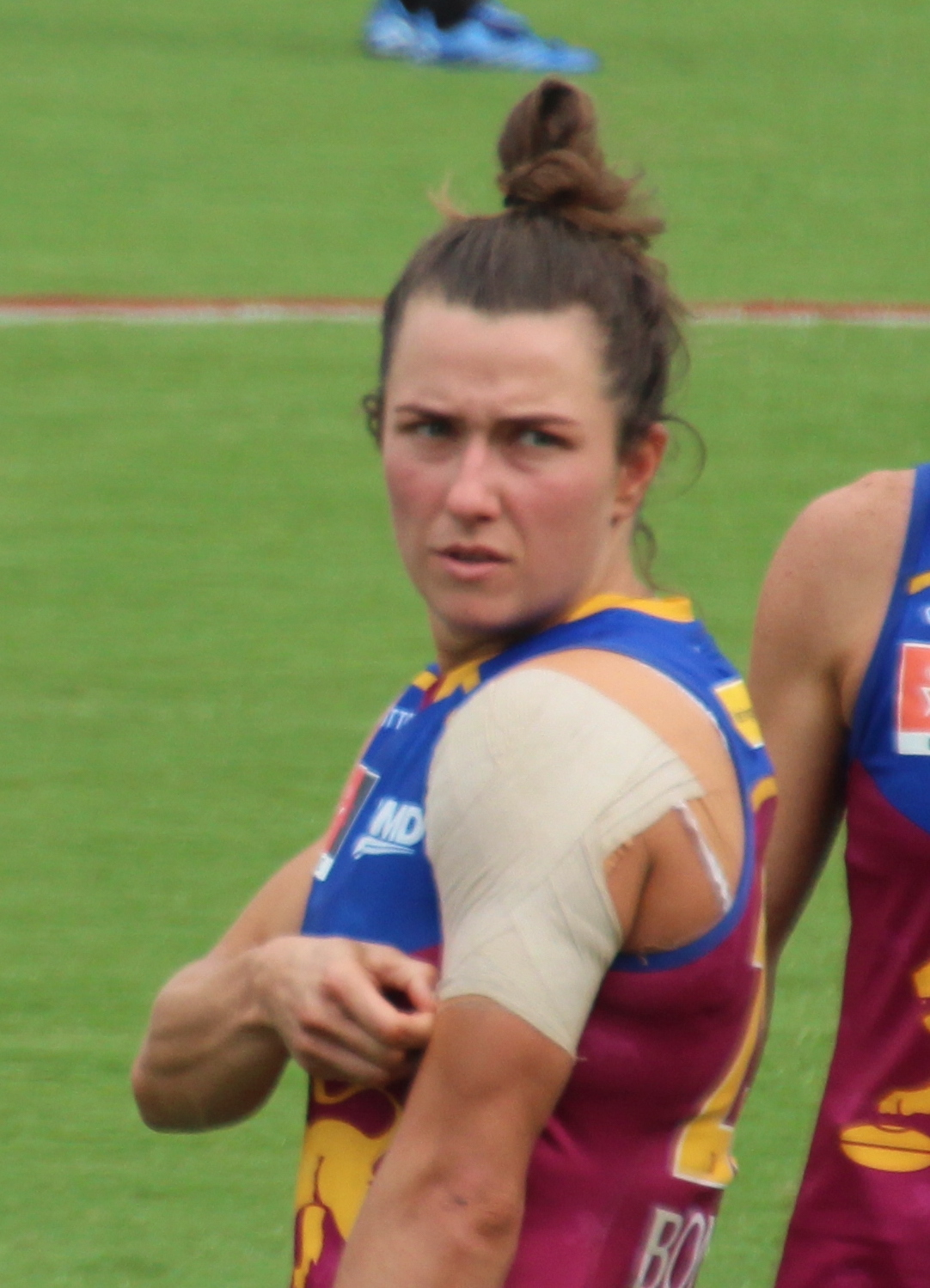
Cathy Svarc is from Corowa

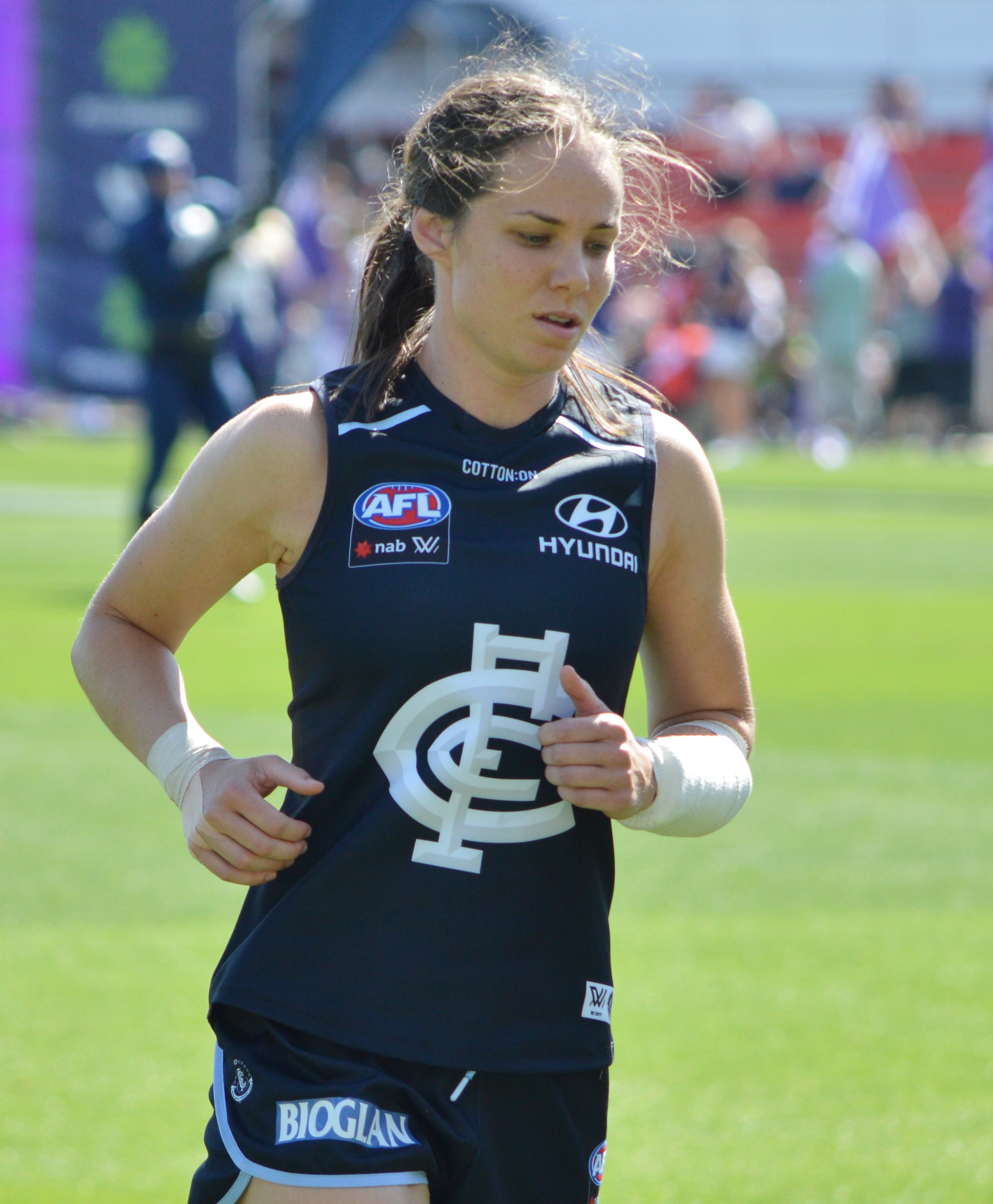
Chloe Dalton is from Sydney

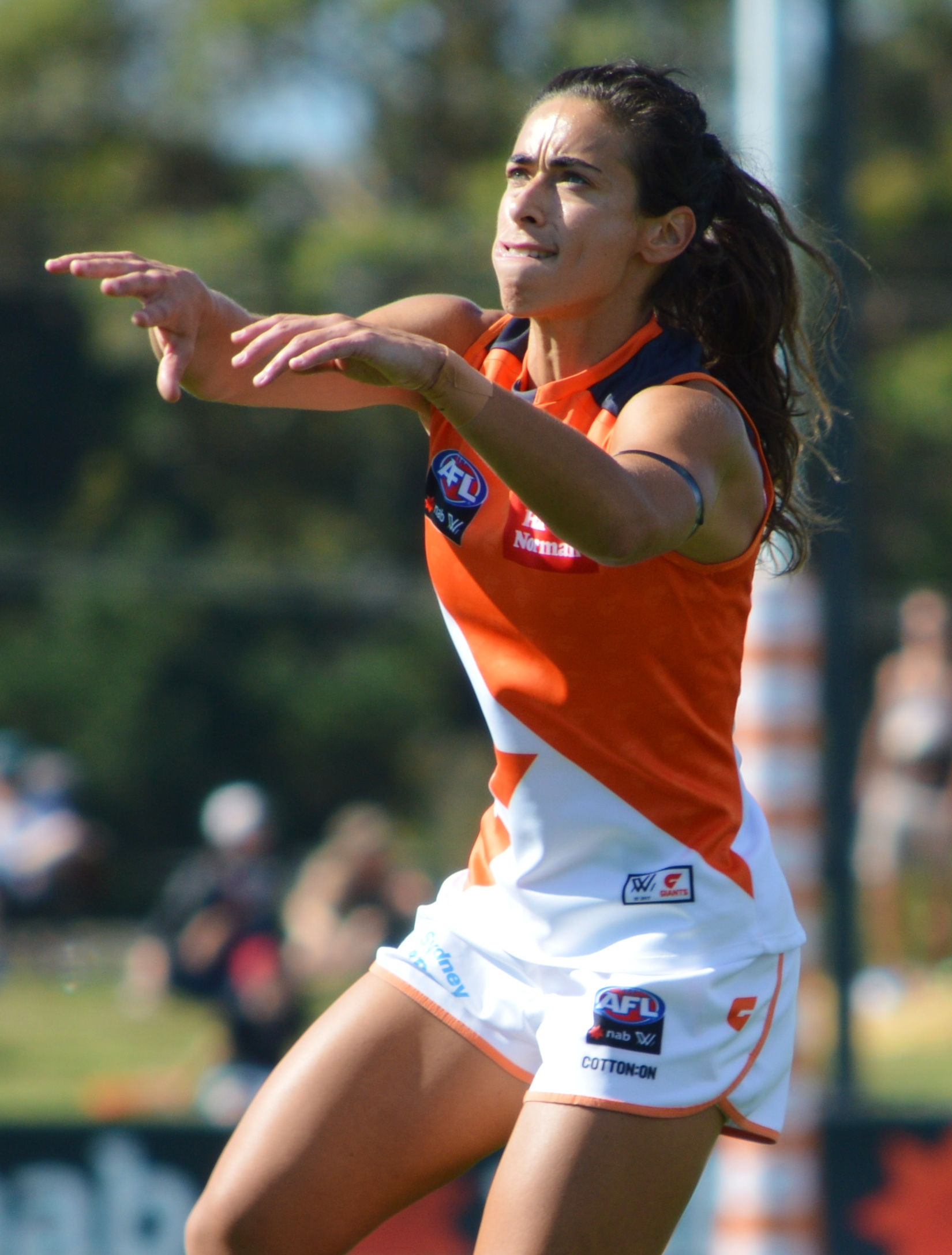
Amanda Farrugia was recruited from Sydney

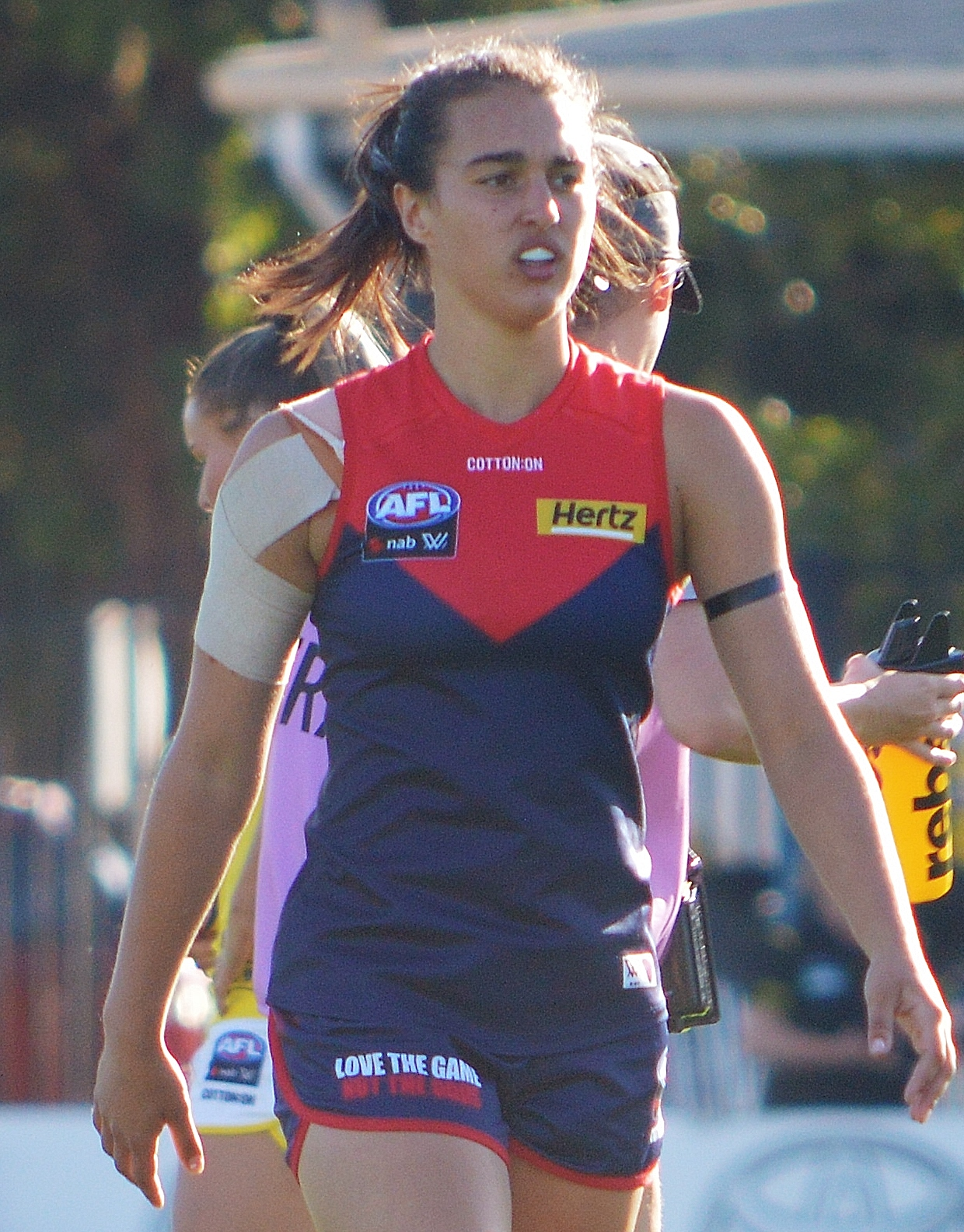
Brenna Tarrant is from Blaxland

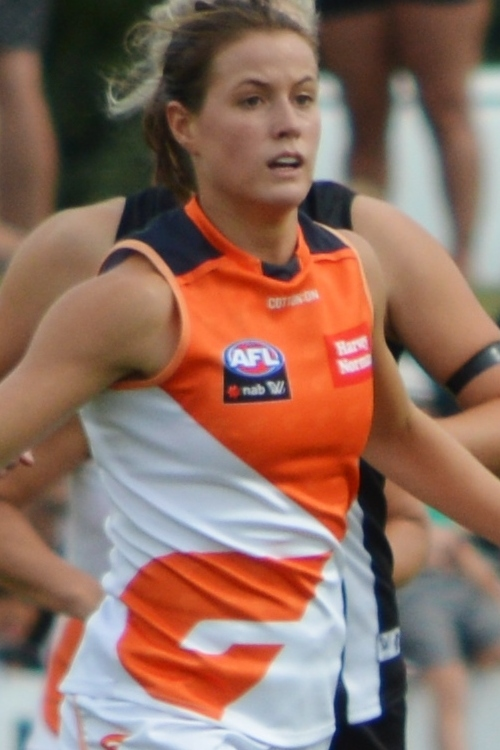
Nicola Barr was schooled in Sydney

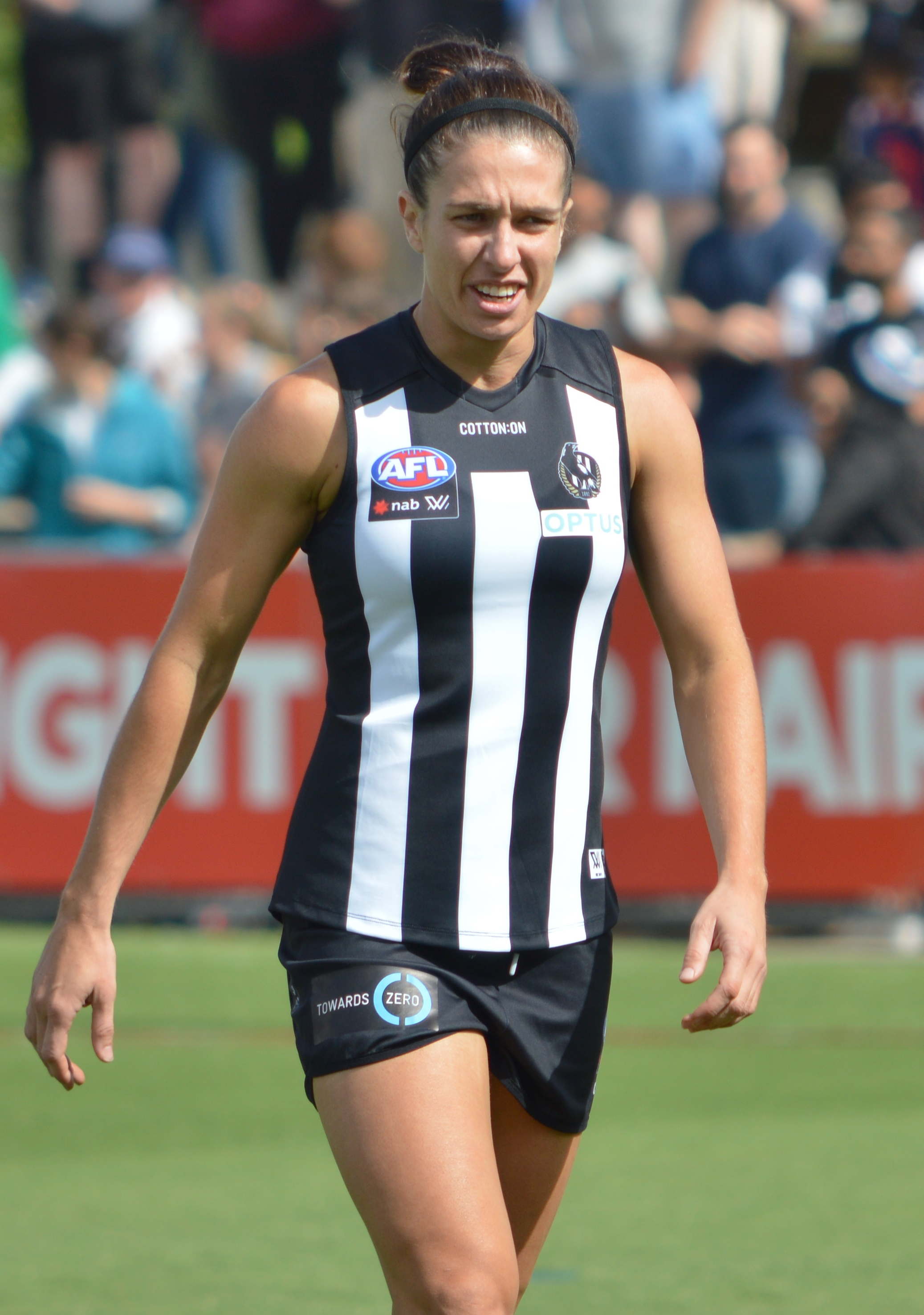
Ashleigh Brazill is from Campbelltown

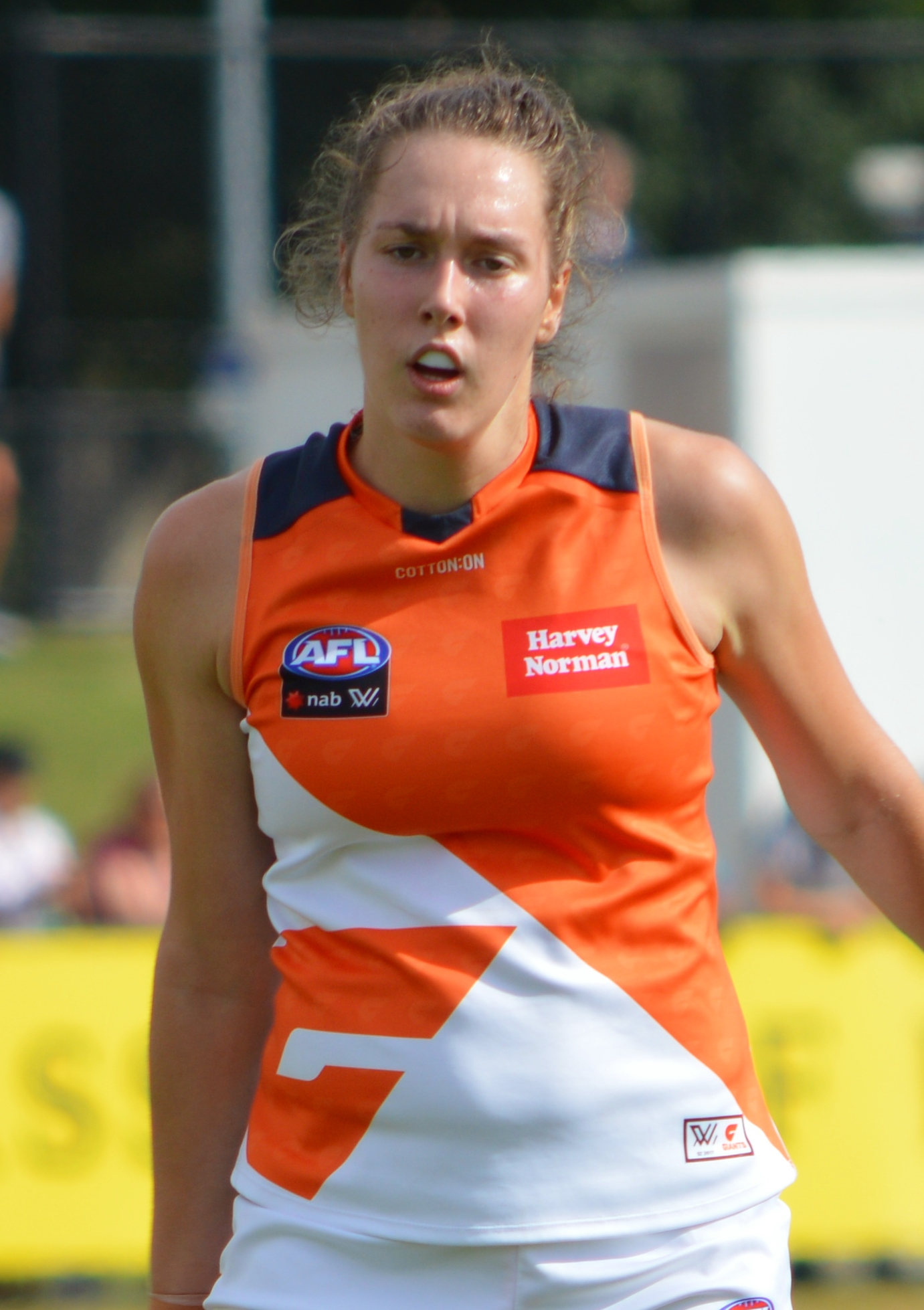
Erin McKinnon All Australian was recruited from Sydney

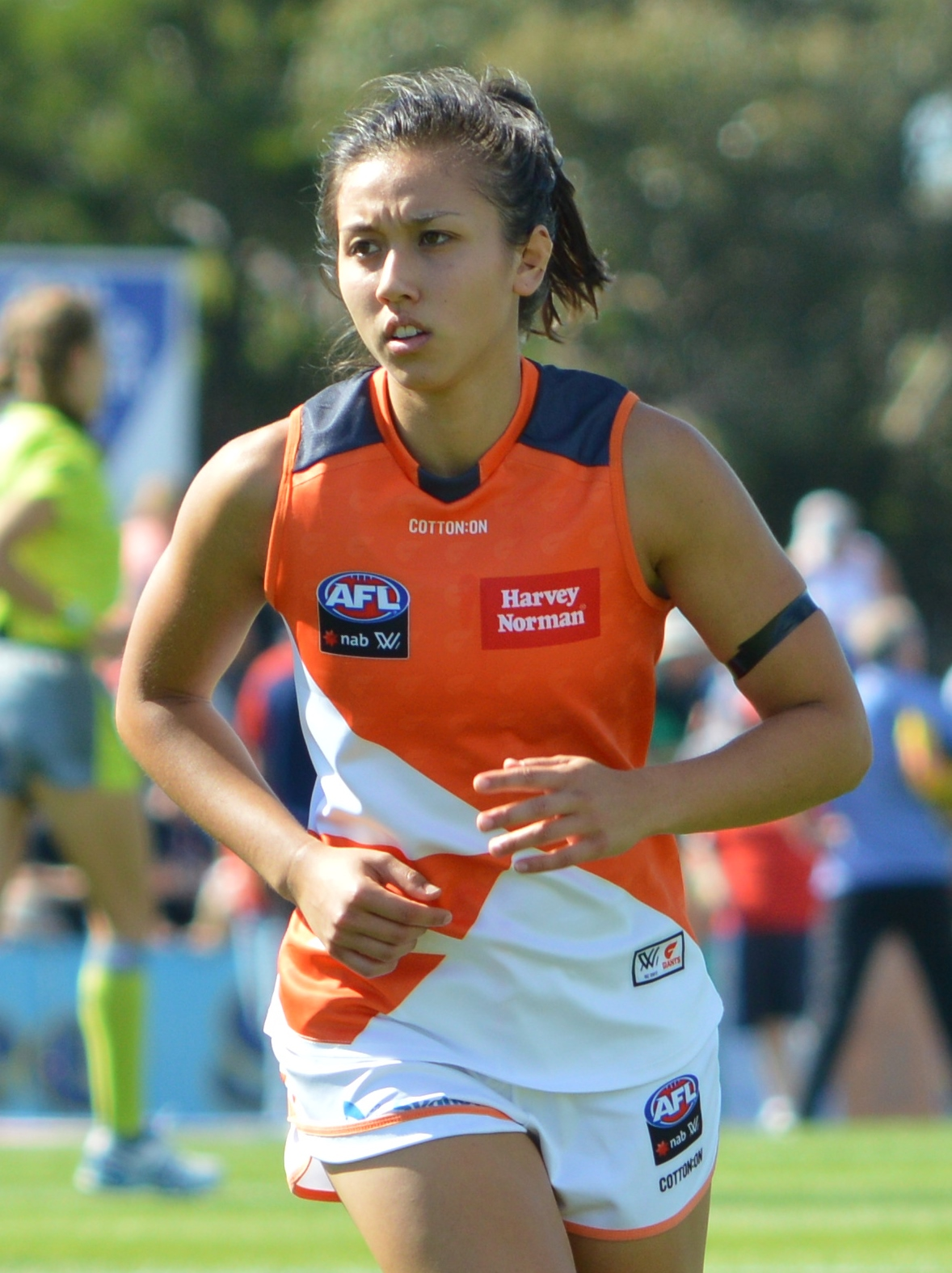
Rebecca Beeson was recruited from Sydney

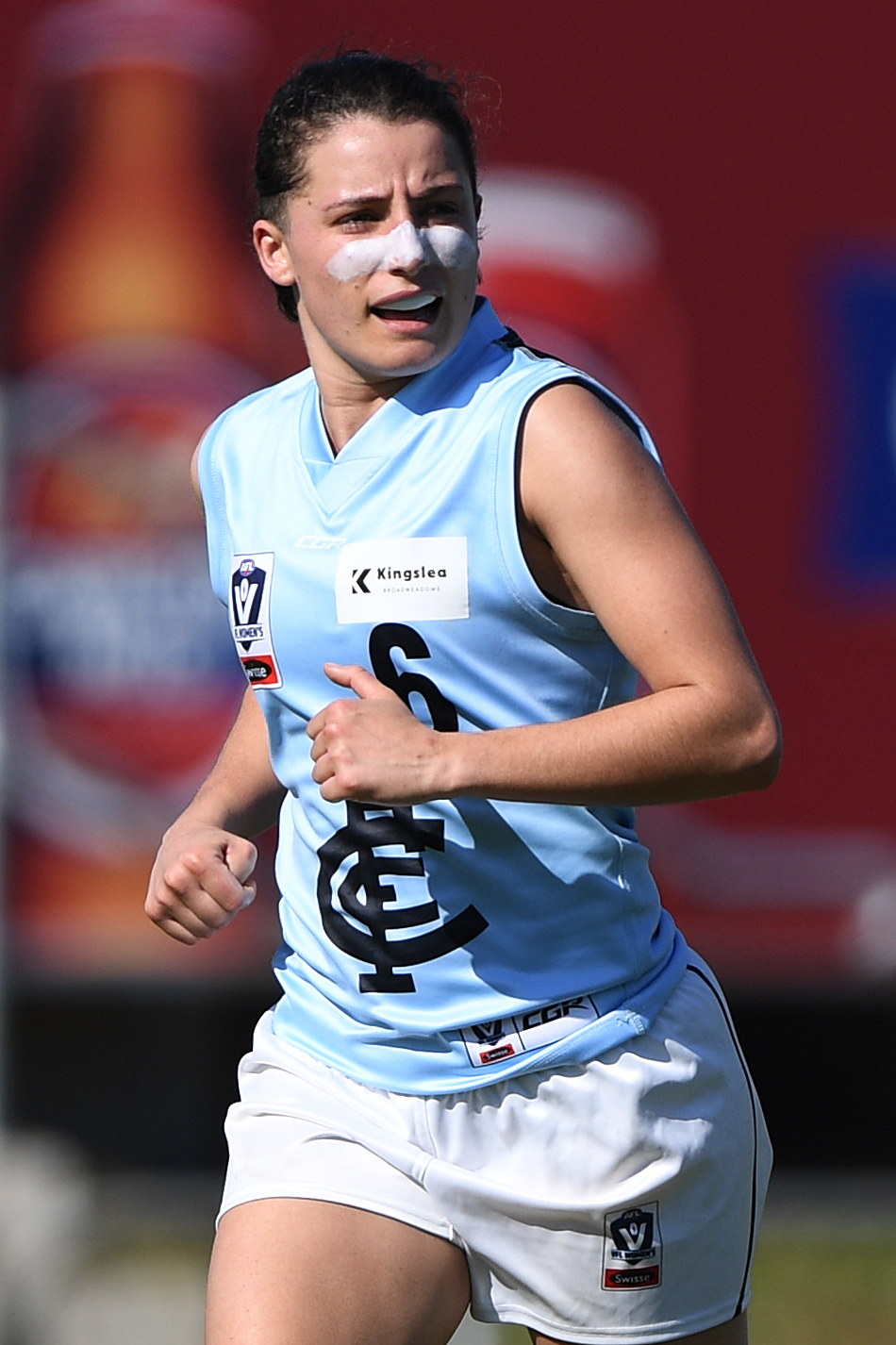
Gab Pound is from Albury

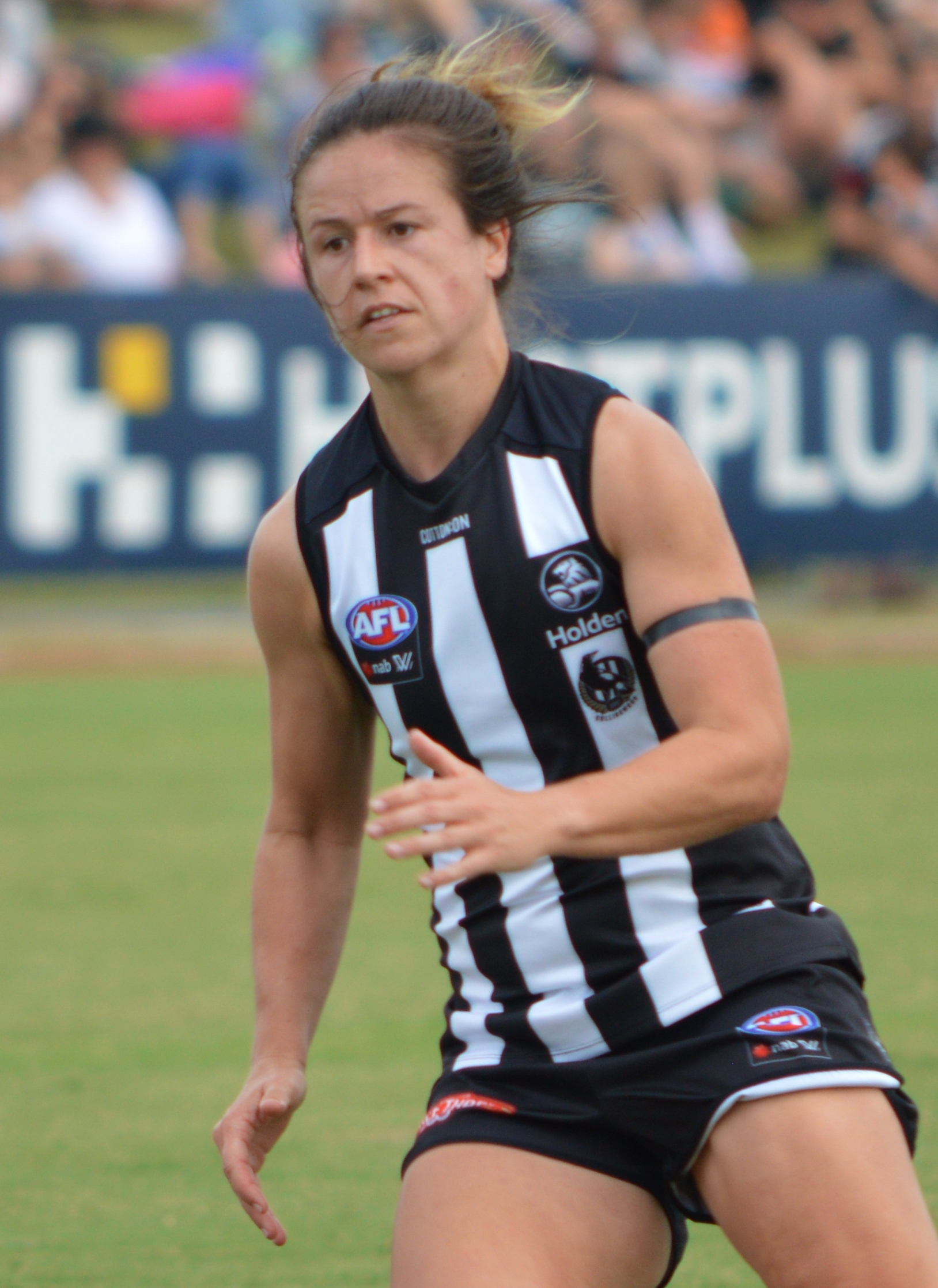
Sophie Casey is from Holbrook

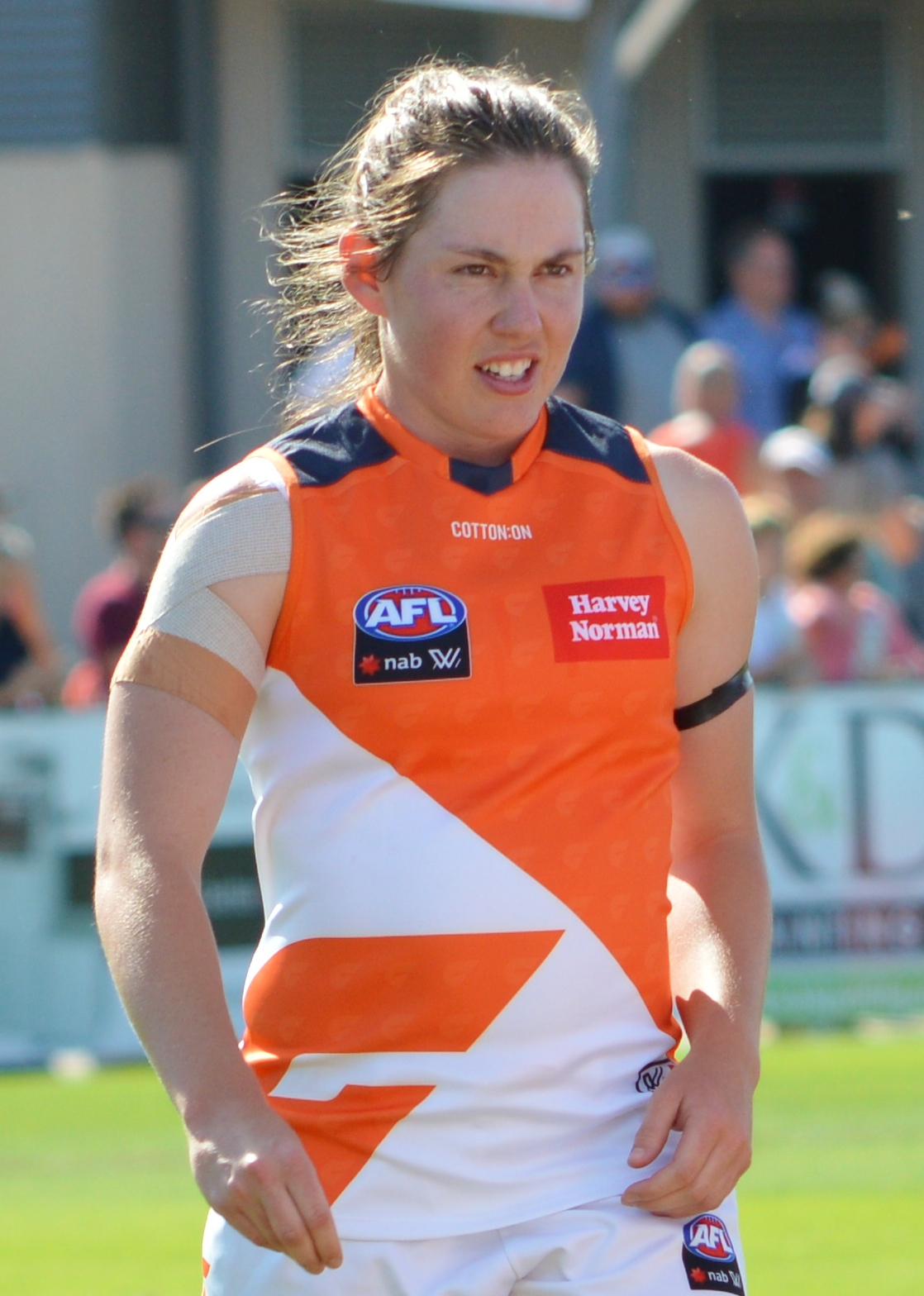
Jodie Hicks is from Hay

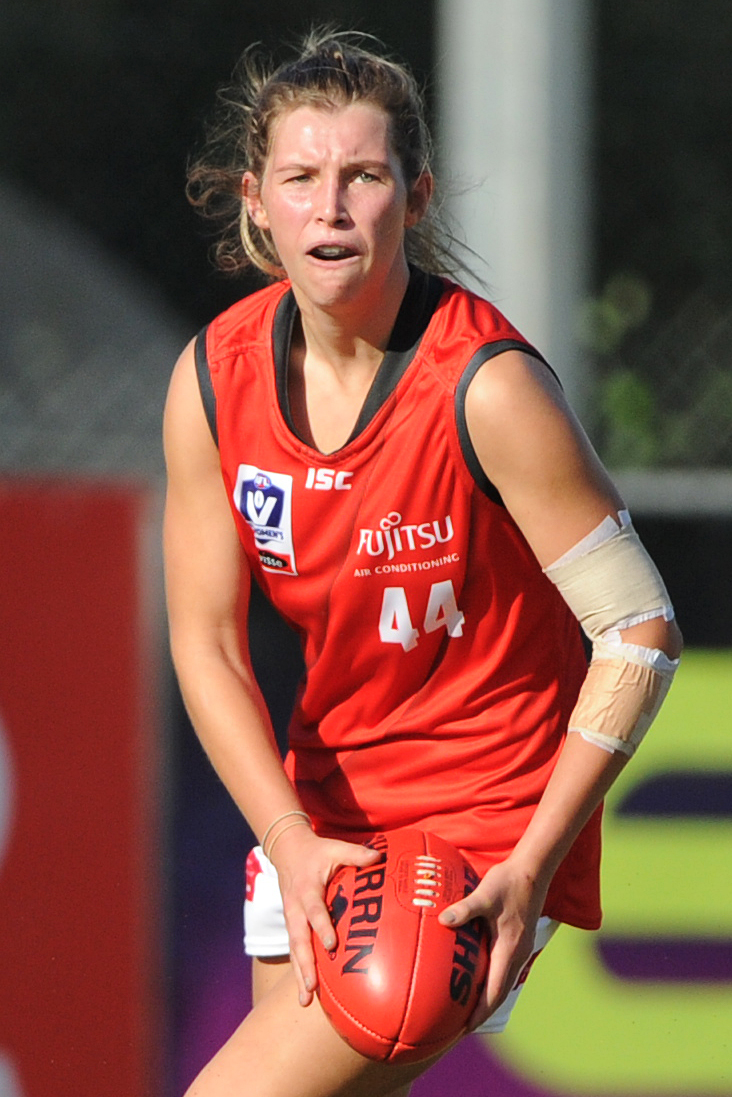
Maddy Collier was recruited from Sydney

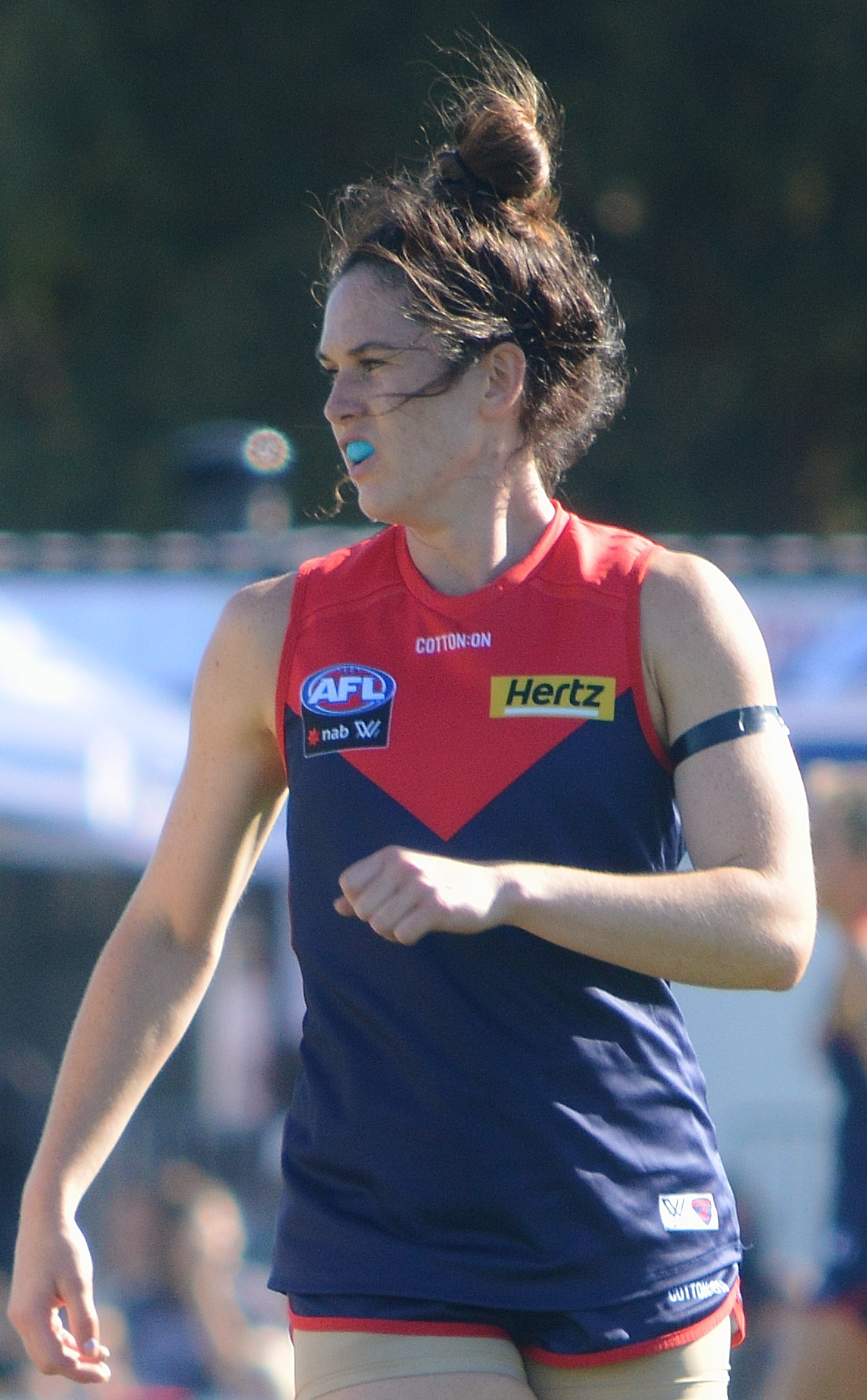
Gabrielle Colvin is from Wagga

==== ALFW players from NSW ====
Currently on an AFLW senior list

Player	NSW junior/senior club/s	Representative honours	AFLW Draft	Selection	AFLW Years	AFLW Games	AFLW (Goals)	Connections to NSW, Notes & References
Holly Cooper	Wallsend West Jnr, Cardiff, Manly Warringah Wolves, Sydney Swans Academy, Sydney		2023	Expansion pre-sign	2024–	–	–	Raised in Newcastle
Cleo Buttifant	Turvey Park, GWS Giants Academy				2024–	1	–	Raised in Wagga
Zara Hamilton	GWS Giants Academy, Greater Western Sydney				–	–	–	Raised in Wagga
Teagan Germech	Bathurst, East Coast Eagles, GWS Giants Academy, Greater Western Sydney				2023–	1	–	Raised in Bathurst
Alice Mitchell	Pittwater, Mosman, Gunnedah, Sydney				2023–	1	–	Raised in Sydney
Tanya Kennedy	Inner West Magpies, UTS, Sydney				2023–	1	–	Recruited from Sydney
Brianna McFarlane	Lower Clarence				2023–	1	–	Raised in Yamba
Dominique Carruthers	North Shore, Macquarie University				2023–	1	–	Raised in Sydney
Madeline Hendrie	East Sydney, UNSW-Eastern Suburbs, Sydney Swans Academy				2023–	1	–	Raised in Sydney
Eleri Morris	Northern Districts, Wollongong, Inner West Magpies, GWS Giants Academy		2023	Supplementary (#13)	2023–	1	–	Raised in and recruited from Illawarra
Isadora McLeay	Willoughby-Mosman, North Shore, Greater Western Sydney				2023–	3	–	Raised in Sydney
Jessica Doyle	Pittwater, Manly Warringah, Sydney Swans Academy, Greater Western Sydney		2021	#49	2022–	24	12	Raised in and recruited from Sydney
Zarlie Goldsworthy	Lavington Panthers, Western Magic, Greater Western Sydney		2022	#20	2022–	18	16	Raised in Albury
Eilish Sheerin	Inner West Magpies, Newtown Breakaways		2022	#58	2022–	22	1	Raised in and recruited from Sydney
Ella Heads	Inner West Magpies, Sydney Swans Academy, Sydney				2022–	22	–	Raised in and recruited from Sydney
Grace Hill	UTS				2022–2024	9	–	Raised in and recruited from Sydney
Georgina Fowler	St Ives, East Coast Eagles, GWS Giants Academy				2022–	3	–	Raised in and recruited from Sydney
Brodee Mowbray	Camden, Southern Power				2022–	12	3	Raised in Camden, Greater Western Sydney
Browdee Mowbray	Camden, Southern Power, Greater Western Sydney				2022–	20	4	Raised in Sydney
Ally Dallaway	East Coast Eagles, Greater Western Sydney				2022–	30	–	Raised in Sydney
Cambridge McCormick	Port Macquarie, Greater Western Sydney				2022–	18	–	Raised in Port Macquarie
Ally Morphett	Wagga High School, East Wagga-Kooringal, Greater Western Sydney, Sydney				2022–	16	1	Raised in Gumly Gumly (Wagga)
Jasmine Simmons	North Broken Hill, Gol Gol				2022–	8	–	Raised in Broken Hill
Ruby Sargent-Wilson	Southern Power, Sydney Swans Academy	U18 (2019)			2022–	4	–	Raised in and recruited from Wollongong (Woonona)
Gabrielle Biedenweg-Webster	Wollongong				2022–	1	0	Raised in Wollongong (Wiradjuri)
Ruby Svarc	–				2021–	29	7	Raised in Corowa
Libby Graham	Manly Warringah Wolves, Greater Western Sydney				2021–	28	0	Raised in Sydney
Olivia Barber	New South Wales country U16 & U18		2020	#21	2021–2023	14	5	Born and raised in Balldale
Tarni Evans	Tathra, Queanbeyan, Greater Western Sydney		2020	#9	2021–	29	1	Raised in Tathra, recruited from Queanbeyan
Cathy Svarc	–				2020–	55	14	Raised in Corowa
Orla O'Dwyer	–		2019 Rookie	Rookie	2020–	55	21	Born in Sydney
Gabrielle Colvin	–		2019	#77	2020–	27	0	Raised in and recruited from Wagga Wagga
Lisa Steane	Nelson Bay, Greater Western Sydney, Sydney		2019	#23	2020–	39	0	Born, raised in and recruited from Nelson Bay
Georgia Garnett	East Coast Eagles, Greater Western Sydney		2019	#90	2020–	33	11	Raised in and recruited from Sydney
Brenna Tarrant	Emu Plains Glenmore Lions (juniors), Kellyville Rouse Hill Magpies (juniors), East Coast Eagles (seniors), Sydney		2019	#72	2020–	37	1	Raised in Blaxland (Blue Mountains), recruited from Sydney
Emily Goodsir	East Coast Eagles, Greater Western Sydney		2019	#76	2020–	10	0	Raised in and recruited from Sydney
Sarah Halvorsen	Newcastle City, Greater Western Sydney		2019	#61	2020–2021	4	1	Raised in Newcastle
Tarnee Tester	West Broken Hill		2019	#56	2020–2021	4	1	Born and raised in Broken Hill (Barkindji)
Alyce Parker	Holbrook, Thurgoona, Greater Western Sydney		2018	#12	2019–	49	8	Born and raised in Holbrook, recruited from Thurgoona
Chloe Dalton	Greater Western Sydney		2018	Rookie	2019–	32	8	Raised in and recruited from Sydney
Jess Foley	–		2018	#30	2019–2020	13	4	Raised in Bega
Taylah Davies	Greater Western Sydney			Rookie	2018–	–	–	Born, raised in and recruited from Wollongong
Jodie Hicks	Greater Western Sydney		2017	#5	2018–	40	5	Born, raised in and recruited from Hay
Ashleigh Brazill	–		2017	#34	2018–	32	5	Born, raised in and recruited from Campbelltown (Sydney)
Stacey Livingstone	–		2016	#70	2017–	66	0	Born
Sophie Casey	Holbrook, Riverina		2016	Free agent	2017–	63	2	Born and raised in Holbrook, recruited from Wagga Wagga
Rebecca Beeson	Macquarie University, UNSW-Eastern Suburbs, Greater Western Sydney		2016	#32	2017–	50	10	Born in Sydney, raised on Central Coast
Gab Pound	Albury High School, Wagga Tigers		2016	#30	2017–	37	3	Raised in Albury
Erin McKinnon	Mosman, Greater Western Sydney		2016	#48	2017–	46	1	Raised in and recruited from Sydney
Nicola Barr	Queenwood School for Girls, Sydney University, Greater Western Sydney		2016	#1	2017–	58	10	Raised in and recruited from Sydney
Maddy Collier	UNSW-Eastern Suburbs, Greater Western Sydney, Sydney		2016	Priority	2017–	39	3	Raised in and recruited from Sydney
Haneen Zreika	Auburn-Penrith Giants, Greater Western Sydney		2017 (Rookie)	Rookie (#1)	2017–	48	9	Born, raised in and recruited from Sydney
Hannah Dunn	Queanbeyan, Greater Western Sydney			Backup	2017–	45	0	Recruited from Queanbeyan
Leah Kaslar	–		2016	#31	2017–2021	36	3	Born Caringbah (Sydney)
Ellie Brush	Greater Western Sydney		2016	Rookie	2017–2020	20	1	Recruited from Sydney
Amanda Farrugia	Macquarie University, Greater Western Sydney		2016	#64	2017–2019	21	2	Born, raised in and recruited from Sydney
Renee Tomkins	Greater Western Sydney		2016	#96	2017–2019	12	0	Born, raised in and recruited from Sydney
Nikki Wallace	Sawtell Toormina Saints		2016	#114	2017	8	0	Raised in Coffs Harbour
Kristy De Pellegrini	Southern Power, Greater Western Sydney		2016	#81	2017	6	0	Raised in and recruited from Sydney
Stephanie Walker	Sydney University, Greater Western Sydney		2016	#113	2017	3	1	Raised in and recruited from Sydney
Codie Briggs	Newtown, Greater Western Sydney		2016	Free agent	2017	3	0	Raised in and recruited from Sydney
Monique Hollick	UNSW-Eastern Suburbs		2016	#136	2017	3	0	Raised in and recruited from Sydney

== See also ==
- Australian rules football in New South Wales
