= Darren Jackson =

Darren Jackson may refer to:

- Darren Jackson (Scottish footballer) (born 1966)
- Darren Jackson (Australian footballer) (born 1961), former Australian rules footballer
- Darren Jackson (politician) (born 1970), member of the North Carolina House of Representatives
- Darren Jackson (fighter) (fl. 2000s), British mixed martial arts fighter
- Darren Jackson (footballer, born 1971) on List of foreign Veikkausliiga players
- Darren Jackson (musician) (fl. 1990s–2000s), from Kid Dakota
- Darren R. Jackson (born 1964), chief executive officer of Advance Auto Parts Inc.
