= Gavin Bayes =

Australian rules footballer

Personal information
- Born: 7 May 1965 (age 61)
- Original team: Jordanville
- Height: 191 cm (6 ft 3 in)
- Weight: 90 kg (198 lb)

Playing career^{1}
Years	Club	Games (Goals)
1985–1987	Richmond	5 (2)
- ^{1} Playing statistics correct to the end of 1987.

Gavin Bayes (born 7 May 1965) is a former Australian rules footballer who played with Richmond in the Victorian Football League (VFL).

Bayes, a recruit from Jordanville, made five league appearances for Richmond. He played three games late in the 1985 VFL season, then just one more in each of the next two years.

While playing for Barooga, Bayes was the Murray Football League leading goal-kicker in the 1991 season. It was the second time he had topped 100 goals in a season, after doing so in 1989, when his total was bettered by Darren Jackson of Finley.

He is the elder brother of Sydney Swans player Mark Bayes.
