= Frank Bourke =

Australian rules footballer

Personal information
- Born: 3 February 1922
- Died: 27 December 2011 (aged 89)
- Original team: Nathalia (MFL)
- Debut: 21 August 1943, Richmond vs. Melbourne, at Punt Road
- Height: 193 cm (6 ft 4 in)
- Weight: 86 kg (190 lb)

Playing career^{1}
Years	Club	Games (Goals)
1943, 1946–1947	Richmond	16 (48)
- ^{1} Playing statistics correct to the end of 1947.

Francis Michael "Frank" Bourke (3 February 1922 – 27 December 2011) was an Australian rules footballer who played for the Richmond Football Club in the Victorian Football League during the 1940s.

He played one game during the 1943 season while on leave from the RAAF. After the war Bourke joined the club for the 1946 season playing in 9 games before a knee injury. He would come back to play in 1947 for 6 games before retirement.

Bourke coached Ganmain Football Club in the South West Football League (New South Wales) to the 1950 premiership, kicking 8 goals in the grand final against Griffith. Bourke also kicked 6 goals in the 1950 second semi final against Griffith too.

Frank Bourke is best known for being the start of the Tigers only three-generation family at the club being the father of Richmond Immortal Francis Bourke and grandfather of David Bourke.
