= Bert Taylor (footballer, born 1911) =

Australian rules footballer, born 1911

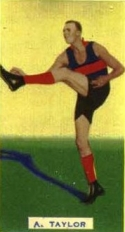

Personal information
- Full name: Albert Ernest Taylor
- Born: 2 June 1911; Corowa, New South Wales
- Died: 30 May 1978 (aged 66); Bendigo, Victoria
- Original team: Finley
- Height: 6 ft 7 in (201 cm)
- Position: Ruck

Playing career^{1}
Years	Club	Games (Goals)
1934–1936	Melbourne	39 (23)
- ^{1} Playing statistics correct to the end of 1936.

Albert Ernest Taylor (2 June 1911 – 30 May 1978) was an Australian rules footballer who played for the Melbourne Football Club in the Victorian Football League (VFL).

== Family ==
The son of Joseph Thomas Taylor (1873–1947), and Mary Christina Taylor (1874–1948), née Detlefsen, Albert Ernest Taylor was born at Corowa, New South Wales on 2 June 1911.

He married Lesley Mary Trewick in 1944.

== Football ==
=== Melbourne (VFL) ===
Taylor was a tall (6 ft 7in), left-footed ruckman, recruited from the Finley Football Club in the Murray Football League.

"With a dozen or more places to be filled through the omission of men who played last year, Melbourne officials are giving due attention to the form of their numerous recruits.
Already some new men have been struck off the list, and the selection committee will act again when they meet after witnessing the form displayed in the two practice matches to be played tomorrow.
Apart from his physique, the outstanding recruit with the Fuschias is Bert Taylor, the giant from Finley, New South Wales. He has not the same awkward movements as some six-footers, and is able to unwind great pace and combine high marking and clever ground play. He should be useful in any key position, as he could be placed on the ball, half-forward or half-back, and acquit himself equally as well." — The Herald, 6 April 1934.

=== VFL Representative team ===
In 1935, he played in three VFL representative matches: against Western Australia on 22 June 1935, against Western Australia on 25 June 1935, and against South Australia on 29 June 1935.

Bert Taylor, centre half-forward for Melbourne (24, 6.4, 15.10, 18 games) is the tallest and heaviest man in League football. He came from the Riverina last year, and has quickly made his mark. A left footer, he is remarkably on the ground for a man of his height, which, however, he does not use to the best advantage in going for marks. He has also followed with success, and should be one of the best in the side." — The West Australian, 19 June 1935.

== Military service ==
Taylor enlisted in the Australian Militia in February 1942. He was discharged in December 1942, on the grounds that, as a farmer, he had a reserved occupation.

== Death ==
He died (suddenly) at his residence in Bendigo, Victoria, on 30 May 1978.
