= Joseph Ritchie (disambiguation) =

Joseph Ritchie (c. 1788–1819) was an English surgeon, explorer and naturalist.

Joseph Ritchie may also refer to:

- J. Murdoch Ritchie (1925–2008), Scottish-born American biophysicist
- Joseph C. Ritchie, mayor of Newport News, Virginia
- Joe Ritchie (born 1947), options and commodities trader
- Joe Ritchie (footballer) (1886–1975), Australian rules footballer
