= Nathalia Football Club =

Football club in Victoria, Australia

Nathalia

Names
- Full name: Nathalia Football Netball Club
- Nickname(s): Purples, Purps
- Club song: 'Grand Old Flag'

Club details
- Founded: 1888; 138 years ago
- Colours
- Competition: Murray Football League
- President: David Liddell
- Coach: Glenn Boyd, Ryan Butler
- Captain: Tom Nihill
- Premierships: Senior Football: 14
- Ground: Nathalia Recreation Reserve

Uniforms
Home

Other information
- Official website: Nathalia FNC

The Nathalia Football Netball Club, nicknamed the Purples, is an Australian rules football and netball club based in the town of Nathalia located in north east Victoria. The club currently compete in the Murray League, which Nathalia joined in 1931.

== Club history ==
The club was established in 1888 and played in a number of different football associations in its early years, winning a number of premierships along the way.

The club managed to win five Goulburn Valley Football Association premierships between 1896 and 1930.

At a Murray Football League (MFL) club's delegates meeting in June, 1940, MFL club's decided to abandoned the season and a motion was carried to conclude the season at the end of the first round. Nathalia Football Club were undefeated when the season was officially abandoned in 1940 "and will retain the pennant until the end of next season's play".

Between 1941 and 1945 the MFL went into recess for World War II.

Former Essendon and Glenelg ruckman, Norm Betson was appointed as captain / coach in 1950.

Nathalia won four in a row from 2005 to 2008 and five in a row from 2015 to 2019. Nathalia now boast the equal most (14) premierships in the Murray Football League alongside the Deniliquin Rams with 10 premierships coming from the last 15 seasons.

== Football Competitions Timeline ==
Goulburn Valley Football Association

- 1888 & 1889

Nathalia Football Club

- 1890 & 1891 – Unsure, in recess ?

Goulburn Valley Football Association

- 1892 to 1897

Nathalia & District Football Association

- 1898 & 1899

Goulburn Valley Football Association

- 1900

Barmah & Lower Moria Football Association

- 1901 to 1903

Nathalia & District Football Association

- 1904

Picola & District Football Association

- 1905

Goulburn Valley Football Association

- 1906

Picola & District Football Association

- 1907

Western & Moria Ridings Football Association

- 1908 to 1915

Nathalia Football Club

- 1916 to 1918 – Club in recess due to World War I.

Western & Moria Ridings Football Association

- 1919 to 1920

Goulburn Valley Football Association

- 1921 to 1930

Western & Moria Ridings Football Association

- 1931 to 1932

Murray Football League

- 1933 to 1940

Nathalia Football Club

- 1941 to 1945 – Club in recess due to World War II.

Murray Football League

- 1946 to present day

== Football Premierships ==
Seniors

- Goulburn Valley Football Association (5):
  - 1896, 1897, 1923, 1927, 1930
- Barmah Central Football Association (1):
  - 1901
- Nathalia District Football Association (1):
  - 1904
- Western & Moira Ridings Football Association (1):
  - 1932
- Picola & District Football League
  - 1947 (NFC 2nds)
- Murray Football League (14):
  - 1939, 1949, 1963, 1978, 2005, 2006, 2007, 2008, 2012, 2015, 2016, 2017, 2018, 2019

Reserves

- Murray Football League
  - 1997, 2000

== League Best & Fairest) ==
Seniors - O'Dwyer Medallists

- 1976 – Peter Pettigrew (15 votes)
- 1983 – Wayne Deledio (28 votes)
- 1985 – B. Morrison (26 votes)
- 2004 – Ashley Gemmill (25 votes)
- 2005 – Nathan Gemmill (19 votes) Joint winner

Reserves

- ?

== Les Mogg Perpetual Trophy Winners (Murray FL – Leading Goalkicker) ==
- 1950 – Denis Bourke: (70 goals)
- 1962 – M. McKay: 64
- 1987 – Michael Souter: 125
- 1988 – Michael Souter: 117
- 2000 – Adam Rudd: 78
- 2004 – Brendon Parker: 92 (108)
- 2005 – Brendon Parker: 120 (131)
- 2006 – Brendon Parker: 108 (121)
- 2007 – Brendon Parker: 106 (111)
- 2012 – Jason Limbrick: 76 (84)
- 2018 – Brodie Ross: 59 (69)
- ( ): Figures in brackets includes goals kicked in finals

== Rising Star Award Winners ==
- 2004 – Drew Barnes
- 2014 – Tom Nihill
- 2017 – Bailey Bell
- 2018 – Adam Jorgensen

== Nathalia FC / VFL / AFL senior football players ==
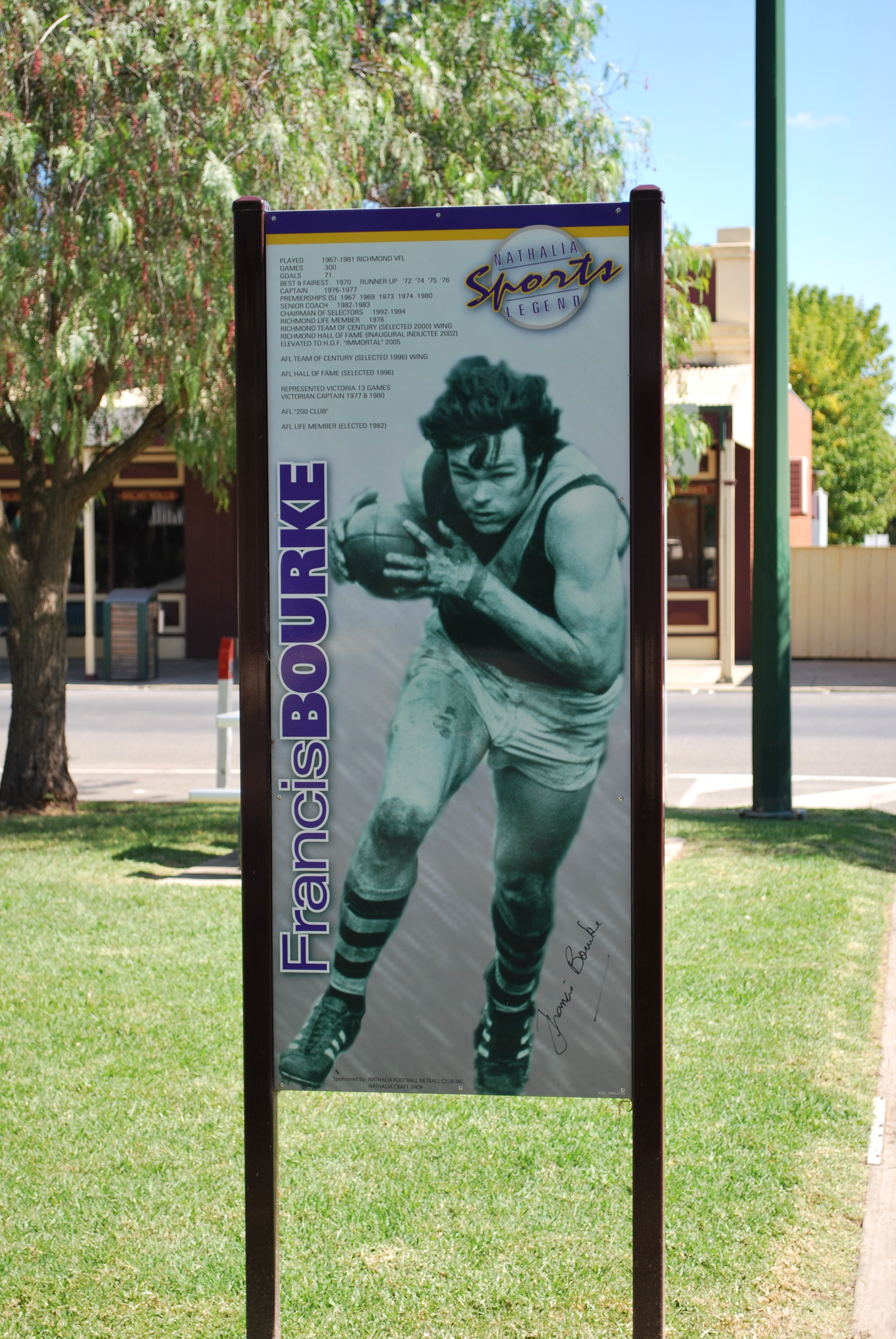
Nathalia's Francis Bourke Sign

The year indicates their VFL / AFL debut match.

Victorian Football League

- 1912 – Keith Doig – University
- 1921 – George Robinson – Richmond
- 1925 – John Sutherland – Footscray
- 1930 – Hope Collins – Richmond
- 1932 – Matt Carland – Essendon & Footscray
- 1936 – Alan Crawford – North Melbourne
- 1941 – Jimmy Bates – Essendon
- 1943 – Frank Bourke (1943, 1946–1947) Richmond – 16 games
- 1965 – Wes Smith – Hawthorn
- 1967 – Francis Bourke (1967–1981) Richmond – 300 games played & 46 games as coach of Richmond.

Australian Football League – National Draft

- 1989 – Brett Hawkey (1989 VFL Draft – # 20) North Melbourne – 0 games
- 1991 – Brendon Parker (1991 AFL Mid-Season Draft – #7) Carlton – 5 games
