= Darren McAsey =

Australian rules footballer (born 1965)

Personal information
- Full name: Darren McAsey
- Born: 16 June 1965 (age 61); Finley, New South Wales
- Original team: Spotswood
- Height: 189 cm (6 ft 2 in)
- Weight: 81 kg (179 lb)

Playing career^{1}
Years	Club	Games (Goals)
1985–1991	Sydney Swans	34 (23)
- ^{1} Playing statistics correct to the end of 1991.

Darren McAsey (born 16 June 1965), also known as Harry McAsey, is a former Australian rules footballer who played with the Sydney Swans in the Victorian/Australian Football League (VFL/AFL).

== Career ==
McAsey, the son of 1950s Footscray player Alan McAsey, played his junior football at Spotswood, but was residentially tied to the Swans, which recruited him into the Under 19s in 1982. He kicked 60 goals for the Under 19s in his first season and captained the side in 1983. During this time he was also a Victorian Teal Cup representative.

He played reserves football in 1984, then made his senior debut in the opening round of the 1985 VFL season and made a total of 11 league appearances that year. Still living in Altona in 1985, McAsey made the move to Sydney the following year.

The 1986 season didn't begin for McAsey until round 20, when he called into the side to play Richmond at the Melbourne Cricket Ground. He kicked three goals in a 48-point win, which he followed up with four goals from a forward pocket when Sydney defeated St Kilda in round 21. His final two games of the season were both against Fitzroy, the second in a semi-final.

A back injury caused McAsey to miss the entire season in 1987 and he played only two league games in 1988. He managed 10 games in 1989, then four in 1990, before being delisted. Sydney however redrafted in the 1991 pre-season and he added a further three games to his tally.

In six seasons of league football he had four different numbers on his guernsey over the source of his career, 46, 12, 33 and 50.

Before retiring, McAsey played a season with Strathmerton, which were coached by one of his former teammates David Bolton.

McAsey ran the Alexandria Hotel in Sydney until 2015.
