= David Simpson (footballer, born 1965) =

Australian rules footballer

Personal information
- Full name: David J. Simpson
- Born: 12 April 1965 (age 61)
- Original team: Numurkah
- Height: 190 cm (6 ft 3 in)
- Weight: 84 kg (185 lb)

Playing career^{1}
Years	Club	Games (Goals)
1984	Geelong	3 (0)
- ^{1} Playing statistics correct to the end of 1984.

David Simpson (born 12 April 1965) is a former Australian rules footballer who played with Geelong in the Victorian Football League (VFL).

Simpson, who came to Geelong from Numurkah in the Murray Football League, appeared in the final three rounds of the 1984 VFL season. He was called up to make his debut, against Fitzroy, when Mark Yeates injured his hamstring in training and played at centre half-back on Garry Sidebottom. His other two games were against Richmond and Hawthorn.
