= Kelly O'Donnell (footballer) =

Australian rules footballer

Personal information
- Full name: Noel O'Donnell
- Born: 16 November 1960 (age 65)
- Original team: Kyabram
- Height: 173 cm (5 ft 8 in)
- Weight: 72.5 kg (160 lb)
- Position: Wing / Rover

Playing career^{1}
Years	Club	Games (Goals)
1979–84	Melbourne	80 (67)
- ^{1} Playing statistics correct to the end of 1984.

Noel "Kelly" O'Donnell (born 16 November 1960) is a former Australian rules footballer who played with Melbourne in the Victorian Football League (VFL).

O'Donnell joined the Fitzroy Football Club in early 1985 as part of the deal which saw Les Parish move to the Demons but O'Donnell broke his shoulder and didn't play a game for the Lions. When told his senior opportunities would be limited in 1986 he chose to retire during the pre-season. After leaving Fitzroy, O'Donnell played football with Yarrawonga Football Club, Nightcliff Football Club, (representing the Northern Territory at the 1988 Bicentennial State of Origin Carnival), and the Barooga Football Club. O'Donnell coached Barooga in 1989 and 1990 and then won the Murray Football League's O'Dwyer Medal in 1992 and won the VCFL Medal for best on ground in 1992 grand final premiership win for Barooga.

O'Donnell then coached the Murray Bushrangers in the TAC Cup from 1994 to 2000 and led them to their first premiership in 1998.

He then moved over to Western Australia to be an assistant coach under former teammate Chris Connolly at Fremantle in 2001. He then moved back to Melbourne in 2009 to be a development coach and is currently involved in the club's recruitment department.

O'Donnell received Life Membership of the Melbourne FC in 2018.

He has a wife named Fairlie and two sons named Mac and Tom.
