= William Scanlan =

William Scanlan or Bill Scanlon could refer to:

- William J. Scanlan (1856–1898), American actor and composer
- Doc Scanlan (William Dennis Scanlan, 1881–1949), American professional baseball player
- Bill Scanlan (1925–2000), Australian footballer
- Bill Scanlan, American broadcast journalist and former host of C-SPAN's Washington Journal

== See also ==
- Bill Scanlon (1956–2021), American tennis player
