= Gerard Toohey =

Australian rules footballer

Personal information
- Full name: Gerard Vincent Toohey
- Born: 22 October 1966 (age 60)
- Original team: Barooga
- Height: 175 cm (5 ft 9 in)
- Weight: 76 kg (168 lb)

Playing career^{1}
Years	Club	Games (Goals)
1985	Geelong	1 (0)
- ^{1} Playing statistics correct to the end of 1985.

Gerard Vincent Toohey (born 22 October 1966) is a former Australian rules footballer who played with Geelong in the Victorian Football League (VFL).

Toohey, a recruit from Barooga, made his only senior VFL appearance for Geelong in the 1985 VFL season. He was one of five changes, for Geelong's round 13 game against Collingwood at Victoria Park, which they won by six points. His brother, Bernard Toohey, missed the game due to suspension.

He later played in the South Australian National Football League, for West Torrens and then West Adelaide.
