= Deledio =

Deledio is a surname. Notable people with the surname include:

- Brett Deledio (born 1987), Australian rules footballer
- Wayne Deledio (born 1955), Australian rules footballer, father of Brett
