= Phil Harrison (footballer) =

Australian rules footballer

Personal information
- Full name: Phillip James Harrison
- Born: 27 July 1961 (age 65)
- Original team: Numurkah
- Height: 182 cm (6 ft 0 in)
- Weight: 70 kg (154 lb)
- Position: Half-back flank

Playing career^{1}
Years	Club	Games (Goals)
1981–1982	Geelong	7 (10)
1983	North Adelaide	9 (6)
1984–1989	Port Adelaide	133 (84)
- ^{1} Playing statistics correct to the end of 1989.

Career highlights
- 1988, 1989 SANFL premierships

Phillip James Harrison (born 27 July 1961) is a former Australian rules footballer who played with Geelong in the Victorian Football League (VFL). He also played for North Adelaide and Port Adelaide in the South Australian National Football League (SANFL).

Harrison, a recruit from Numurkah in the Murray Football League, was a half back flanker in the Geelong reserves 1980, 1981 and 1982 premiership teams. He made seven senior appearances for the VFL club, two in 1981 and five in 1982.

In 1983, Harrison played in the SANFL for North Adelaide.

He moved to Port Adelaide for the 1984 season and remained there until 1989, when he retired with a second successive premiership.

From 1990 to 1992, Harrison captain-coached Millicent in the Western Border Football League. Harrison was then captain-coach of Tantanoola in 1993. He coached Modbury from 2008 to 2010 and steered them to a division two premiership in his first year. In 2012 he coached Broadview.
