= Jock Fahey =

Australian rules footballer

Personal information
- Full name: John Fahey
- Born: 22 October 1911
- Died: 27 June 1936 (aged 24); Between Numurkah and Wunghnu
- Original team: Numurkah Football Club
- Height: 179 cm (5 ft 10 in)
- Weight: 81 kg (179 lb)

Playing career^{1}
Years	Club	Games (Goals)
1932–1934	South Melbourne	31 (11)
- ^{1} Playing statistics correct to the end of 1934.

John Fahey (22 October 1911 – 27 June 1936) was an Australian rules footballer who played with South Melbourne in the Victorian Football League (VFL).

Fahey came to South Melbourne from Murray Football League club Numurkah. He made 12 games appearances in 1932, his debut season, which included a semi-final. In 1933, a premiership year for South Melbourne, Fahey played six games. He played 13 games in 1934 but missed the finals series after he scalded his foot at work. South Melbourne were losing grand finalists that year.

He left South Melbourne in 1935 to take up a position as coach of Warrnambool in the Hampden Football League. They finished second on the ladder that year, with 10 wins and 5 losses, then progressed to the grand final, where they met minor premiers Mortlake. Warrnambool, with coach Fahey starring at centre half-back, won the grand final by 21 points, to claim their first premiership in the league.

In 1936, Fahey returned home to captain-coach Numurkah in the Murray Football League (MFL). They got off to a good start, winning their first six games under Fahey. On 27 June 1936, Fahey was riding a bicycle from Numurkah to his home in Wunghnu when he was struck by a motor vehicle. He died of his injuries. Fahey remarkably finished second in the 1936 MFL – O’Dwyer Medal.
