= Stuart Russell (footballer) =

Australian rules footballer, born 1906

Personal information
- Full name: Stuart Russell
- Born: 17 July 1906; Tocumwal, New South Wales
- Died: 16 July 1978 (aged 71); Essendon, Victoria
- Original teams: Cobram, Barooga
- Height: 173 cm (5 ft 8 in)
- Weight: 81 kg (179 lb)

Playing career^{1}
Years	Club	Games (Goals)
1926, 1931	Essendon	6 (1)
1932	Hawthorn	7 (2)
Total		13 (3)
- ^{1} Playing statistics correct to the end of 1932.

Stuart Russell (17 July 1906 – 16 July 1978) was an Australian rules footballer who played with Essendon and Hawthorn in the Victorian Football League (VFL).

Russell was initially recruited from the Cobram Football Club in the Goulburn Valley Football Association in 1926.

Russell returned to Essendon in 1931 via the Barooga Football Club from the Murray Football League for three senior appearances before playing with the Hawthorn Football Club in 1932.
