= Rumbalara Football Netball Club =

Aboriginal Australian sporting club

Rumbalara

Names
- Full name: Rumbalara Football Netball Club
- Nickname: Rumba
- Motto: Proud. Strong. Family.
- Club song: Rumbalara Theme Song

Club details
- Founded: 1997
- Colours
- Competition: Murray Football League
- President: Corey Walker
- Premierships: 4 (1998, 1999, 2002, 2014)
- Ground: Rumbalara Recreation Reserve, Shepparton

Uniforms
Home

Other information
- Official website: https://www.rfnc.com.au/

The Rumbalara Football Netball Club (Rumbalara FNC), nicknamed Rumba, is an Aboriginal Australian sporting club located in Shepparton, Victoria. The club's teams play Australian Rules Football (in the Murray Football League) since 2006.

== History ==
The club has its roots in the Cummeragunja Reserve, whose last residents were moved to Rumbalara in 1956.

The Rumbalara Football Club debuted in 1997 in second division of the Goulburn Valley Football League and finished fourth. The following year it won the Second division pennant, defeating Alexandra.

In 1999 Rumbalara and all the second division clubs seceded from the Goulburn Valley FL and formed the Central Goulburn Football League. It won the first premiership of the league and also won in 2002. It was runner-up in 2004 and 2005. It lost the 2004 Grand final replay by six points.

When the Central Goulburn Football League finished in 2005 the club was unsuccessful in applying for admittance into the Goulburn Valley Football League. It was admitted to the Murray Football League in 2006.

In 2014 Rumbalara defeated Finley Football Club by 5 points in an epic Murray Football League grand final at Moama Recreation Reserve to win their first premiership in the league. 30 points down at half time, Rumba powered home in the second half, with former Collingwood and West Coast Eagles player Brad Dick kicking the goal to put Rumba in front with just two minutes remaining.

Competition	Active	Total games	Wins	Losses	Draws	Percentage wins	Flags
Goulburn Valley Football League Div 2	1997-1998	42	26	15	1	61.90%	1
Central Goulburn Football League	1999–2005	135	86	47	2	63.70%	2
Murray Football League	2006–2018 >	241	114	127	1	47.30%	1

== Football Premierships ==
Seniors

- Murray Football League
  - 2014
- Central Goulburn Football League
  - 1999, 2002
- Goulburn Valley Football League - Division 2
  - 1998

== AFL Players ==
- Chris Egan - Collingwood
- Jarrod Atkinson - Essendon
