= Frank Scanlan =

Frank Scanlan may refer to:

- Frank Scanlan (baseball)
- Frank Scanlan (footballer)
