= Jim Broockmann =

Australian rules footballer

Personal information
- Full name: James Broockmann
- Born: 6 May 1936
- Died: 31 October 2011 (aged 75)
- Original team: Finley
- Height: 192 cm (6 ft 4 in)
- Weight: 89 kg (196 lb)

Playing career^{1}
Years	Club	Games (Goals)
1958	Fitzroy	3 (0)
- ^{1} Playing statistics correct to the end of 1958.

James Broockmann (6 May 1936 – 31 October 2011) is a former Australian rules footballer who played with Fitzroy in the Victorian Football League (VFL).
