= Strathmerton Football Club =

Australian football club

Strathmerton

Names
- Full name: Strathmerton Football Netball Club
- Nickname: Bulldogs
- Club song: "It's a grand old flag" (based on Melbourne's theme song)

2024 season
- Home-and-away season: 2nd of 15
- Leading goalkicker: Tim Looby (123 goals)

Club details
- Founded: 1894; 132 years ago
- Colours
- Competition: Picola & District Football League
- President: Michael Keane
- Coach: Tim Looby, Zach Betson
- Captain: Adrian Crestani
- Ground: Strathmerton Recreation Reserve

Uniforms
Home

The Strathmerton Football Netball Club, nicknamed the Bulldogs, is an Australian rules football and netball club that was established in 1894 and has been affiliated with the Picola & District Football League since 1994.

The club is based in the small Victorian town of Strathmerton at the local Recreation Reserve and fields four football teams and seven netball teams.

In 1947, the club unveiled a Roll of Honour of club footballers who enlisted for active service abroad in World War II.

== Football Leagues ==
- Murray Border Football Association
  - 1896
- Federal District Football Association
  - 1897 to 1902
- Goulburn Valley Football Association
  - 1903
  - 1904 to 1910 – (Northern Division)
- Strathmerton Football Club
  - 1911 to 1912 – Club in recess
- Goulburn Valley Football Association
  - 1913 to 1914
- Strathmerton Football Club
  - 1915 to 1918 – Club in recess. World War I
- Goulburn Valley Football Association
  - 1919 to 1920 – (Northern Division)
  - 1921 to 1930
- Murray Football League
  - 1931 to 1935
- Picola & District Football League
  - 1936 to 1937
- Murray Football League
  - 1938 to 1993
- Picola & District Football League
  - 1994 to 2020

== Football Premierships ==
Senior Football

- Federal District Football Association
  - 1899, 1900
- Picola & District Football League
  - 1936, 1937, 1997, 2010, 2015, 2019
- Murray Football League
  - 1956, 1964

Reserves Football

1974, 2014, 2022

Thirds Football

?

Fourths Football

?

== Football Runners Up ==
Senior Football

- Federal District Football Association
  - 1902
- Murray Football League
  - 1931, 1960, 1975
- Picola & District Football League
  - 2013, 2014, 2016, 2017

Reserves Football

?

== League Best & Fairest Winners ==
Senior Football

Murray Football League – O'Dwyer Medal

- 1956 – Len Carter
- 1957 – J J Ryan
- 1958 – J J Ryan
- 1959 – J J Ryan
- 1963 – J J Ryan
- 1964 – J J Ryan
- 1966 – Norm Smith
- 1973 – R Dunn
- 1984 – C Bell
- 1988 – C Newell

Picola & District Football League

- 2012 - J Evans
- 2019 - Tyron Hill
- 2023 - Jake Ellery

== Strathmerton FC players who played in the VFL ==
The following footballers played with Strathmerton FC, prior to playing senior football in the VFL, with the year indicating their VFL debut.

- 1950 – Frank Tuck – Collingwood
- 1957 – Len Carter – Hawthorn
- 1965 – Daryl Mares – Hawthorn
- 1967 – Norm Smith – Hawthorn
- 1969 – Pat Patterson – Geelong
- 1981 – Stephen Reynoldson – Geelong & Brisbane Bears
- 1987 – Scott Christie – North Melbourne. 1987 VFL Draft, pick 17. No senior VFL/AFL games.

== VFL / AFL footballers who have come to play at the Strathmerton FC ==
The following footballers have come to play with Strathmerton FC, with senior football experience from an VFL / AFL club. The year indicates their debut with Strathmerton FC.

- 1950s – Jim McColl – Essendon
- 1964 – Lance Oswald – St. Kilda
- 1990s – Darren McAsey – Sydney Swans
- 1990s – David Bolton – Sydney Swans
