= Billy Payne (footballer) =

Australian rules footballer

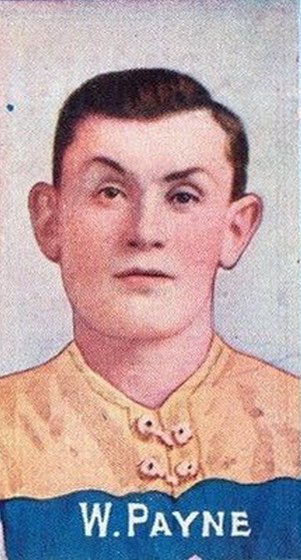
- Cigarette card of Payne in 1909

Personal information
- Full name: William John Payne
- Born: 25 December 1881; Numurkah, Victoria
- Died: 22 July 1967 (aged 85); Frankston, Victoria
- Original teams: Numurkah, Footscray (VFA)
- Height: 177 cm (5 ft 10 in)
- Weight: 77 kg (170 lb)
- Position: Defender

Playing career^{1}
Years	Club	Games (Goals)
1904–1912	Carlton	127 (0)
- ^{1} Playing statistics correct to the end of 1912.

William John Payne (25 December 1881 – 22 July 1967) was an Australian rules footballer who played for Carlton in the Victorian Football League (VFL) during the early 1900s.

Recruited from Footscray via Numurkah, Payne was a half-back flanker and played in Carlton's losing 1904 VFL Grand Final in his debut season.

He was one of Carlton's stars in their 1906 VFL Grand Final premiership, being awarded best on ground honours.

Also used at centre half-back and full back, Payne played in both of Carlton's 1907 VFL Grand Final and in their 1908 VFL Grand Final wins to complete a hat-trick of flags.

He played for Ararat after leaving Carlton.
