= Len Carter (footballer) =

Australian rules footballer

Personal information
- Full name: Len Carter
- Born: 7 December 1934
- Died: 12 July 2006 (aged 71)
- Original team: Strathmerton
- Height: 185 cm (6 ft 1 in)
- Weight: 80 kg (176 lb)

Playing career^{1}
Years	Club	Games (Goals)
1957	Hawthorn	1 (0)
- ^{1} Playing statistics correct to the end of 1957.

Len Carter (7 December 1934 – 12 July 2006) was an Australian rules footballer who played with Hawthorn in the Victorian Football League (VFL).

Carter was recruited from Strathmerton in the Murray Football League (MFL), after winning the 1956 MFL premiership and the O'Dwyer Medal.
