= Pat Patterson (footballer) =

Australian rules footballer

Personal information
- Full name: Pat Patterson
- Born: 13 November 1946
- Original teams: Strathmerton, University Blacks
- Height: 179 cm (5 ft 10 in)
- Weight: 73 kg (161 lb)

Playing career^{1}
Years	Club	Games (Goals)
1969	Geelong	8 (0)
- ^{1} Playing statistics correct to the end of 1969.

Pat Patterson (born 13 November 1946) is a former Australian rules footballer who played with Geelong in the Victorian Football League (VFL).
