= Terry Walsh (footballer) =

Australian rules footballer

Personal information
- Full name: Martin Terence Walsh
- Born: 21 June 1927; Finley, New South Wales
- Died: 20 July 1955 (aged 28); Tocumwal, New South Wales
- Original team: Finley
- Height: 183 cm (6 ft 0 in)
- Weight: 84 kg (185 lb)

Playing career^{1}
Years	Club	Games (Goals)
1947–48	North Melbourne	27 (8)
- ^{1} Playing statistics correct to the end of 1948.

Martin Terence Walsh (21 June 1927 – 20 July 1955) was an Australian rules footballer who played with North Melbourne in the Victorian Football League (VFL).

Born and raised in Finley, Walsh spent two seasons with the North Melbourne before returning to Finley for family reasons.

He was driving his utility with another man when he failed to see a railcar approach. Walsh died instantly in a level-crossing collision near Tocumwal in July 1955. He was survived by a wife and three young boys.
