= Matt Carland =

Australian rules footballer, born 1909

Personal information
- Full name: Matthew John Carland
- Born: 8 September 1909; Nathalia, Victoria
- Died: 5 February 1998 (aged 88)
- Original teams: Nathalia, Castlemaine
- Height: 180 cm (5 ft 11 in)
- Weight: 79 kg (174 lb)

Playing career^{1}
Years	Club	Games (Goals)
1932	Essendon	6 (0)
1938	Footscray	1 (0)
Total		7 (0)
- ^{1} Playing statistics correct to the end of 1938.

Matthew John Carland (8 September 1909 – 5 February 1998) was an Australian rules footballer who played with Essendon and Footscray in the Victorian Football League (VFL).
