= Chris O'Dwyer =

Australian rules footballer

Personal information
- Full name: Chris O'Dwyer
- Born: 27 October 1971 (age 55)
- Original team: Barooga
- Height: 188 cm (6 ft 2 in)
- Weight: 78 kg (172 lb)

Playing career^{1}
Years	Club	Games (Goals)
1990–1992	Sydney Swans	8 (1)
1993	Carlton	0 (0)
- ^{1} Playing statistics correct to the end of 1993.

Chris O'Dwyer (born 27 October 1971) is a former Australian rules footballer who played with the Sydney Swans in the Australian Football League (AFL).

O'Dwyer was originally from Barooga in the New South Wales Riverina, but played at Assumption College before being recruited by Sydney.

He played five games for the Swans in the 1990 AFL season and another three in 1991. After not making a single appearance in 1992, O'Dwyer was drafted by Carlton.

In 1993, instead of representing for Carlton, O'Dwyer began playing for Sydney team Eastern Suburbs. O'Dwyer was the Phelan Medalist in 1994 and won four club best and fairest awards. He was also coach of Eastern Suburbs in 1997 and 1998, while still active as a player. By the time he retired in 2000 he had played 168 games for Eastern Suburbs.
