= John Brinkkotter =

Australian rules footballer

Personal information
- Born: 6 May 1966 (age 60)
- Original team: Barooga
- Draft: No. 10, 1986 national draft
- Debut: 1988, Sydney Swans vs. Footscray, at Waverley Park
- Height: 190 cm (6 ft 3 in)
- Weight: 88 kg (194 lb)

Playing career^{1}
| Years | Club | Games (Goals) |
| 1988–1989 | Sydney Swans | 5 (1) |
- ^{1} Playing statistics correct to the end of 1989.

John Brinkkotter is a former Australian rules footballer who played for the Sydney Swans in the Victorian Football League (VFL) between 1988 and 1989. Brinkkotter was recruited from the Barooga Football Club and, making his debut in Round One of the 1988 VFL season against Footscray at Waverley Park, played five games in two seasons, kicking one goal.
