= Graham Ion =

Australian rules footballer

Personal information
- Full name: Graham Ion
- Born: 12 October 1940
- Height: 178 cm (5 ft 10 in)
- Weight: 76 kg (168 lb)

Playing career^{1}
Years	Club	Games (Goals)
1958–1965	Footscray	107 (85)
- ^{1} Playing statistics correct to the end of 1965.

Graham Ion (born 12 October 1940) is a former Australian rules footballer who played with Footscray in the Victorian Football League (VFL).

Ion made his league debut at just 17 years of age, against Melbourne at Western Oval in 1958. It was his only game of the season, but he was a regular member of the team from 1959.

A key forward despite his small stature, he kicked 27 goals in 1961 to finish third in Footscray's goal-kicking. He played all 21 games that year, including the 1961 VFL Grand Final loss, where he played at centre half-forward. When Ted Whitten was away playing interstate football, Ion captained Footscray in their round 13 fixture against North Melbourne - he was only 20 years old at the time. His brother, Barry Ion, was also in the Footscray side that day.

In 1962 he again played every game for Footscray, and also kicked three goals in an appearance for the VFL representative team which defeated Western Australia.

He played 14 games in 1963, but just nine the following season as he was out of action for eight weeks due to an appendix operation.

His final season, in 1965, was interrupted by a four-week suspension for striking Geelong's Ian Scott, but they were the only games he missed that year.

After leaving Footscray he captain-coached Deniliquin Football Club to the 1966 Murray Football League premiership and won the 1967 Murray Football League O’Dwyer Medal. Ion coached South West Football League (New South Wales) club, Turvey Park Football Club from 1969 to 1972. Turvey Park were runners up in the 1970 grand final.

Ion then coached Mangoplah Cookardinia FC from 1973 to 1975. Mangoplah were runners up in 1974 in the Farrer Football League.
