= Jarrod Atkinson =

Australian rules footballer (born 1985)

Personal information
- Born: 21 February 1985 (age 41)
- Original team: Rumbalara / Bendigo Bombers
- Draft: 21st overall, 2007 Rookie Draft; Essendon
- Debut: 4 May 2008, Essendon vs. Port Adelaide, at Docklands
- Height: 181 cm (5 ft 11 in)
- Weight: 81 kg (179 lb)

Playing career^{1}
Years	Club	Games (Goals)
2008–2010	Essendon	17 (5)
- ^{1} Playing statistics correct to the end of 2010.

Jarrod Atkinson is an Australian rules footballer who played for Essendon. He began the 2008 season on the rookie list but was elevated to the senior list to replace Andrew Lovett and debuted in round 7.

Jarrod Atkinson was a mature-age draftee aged 23 when he was picked up by Essendon in the 2007 rookie draft after impressing selectors as a defender in the VFL with the Bendigo Bombers in that same year.

He started the 2008 season showing great potential playing in the pre-season cup where his size and speed suggested he could succeed at the elite level. Jarrod also showed he is out to make the most of his opportunity at Essendon by breaking the club's sprint record over 20m with a time of 2.73 Seconds previously jointly held by Alwyn Davey, Courtenay Dempsey and Leroy Jetta.

Atkinson's efforts were rewarded by being promoted to the senior list in April 2008 after Scott Lucas was placed on the long-term injury list. He played his debut game for Essendon, along with fellow debutants, Darcy Daniher and David Myers, in Round 7 against Port Adelaide at the Dome. He finished the year playing five senior games.

He played a further five games in 2009 and seven in 2010.

He was delisted by the club before the 2011 season.
