= Eddie Hanley =

Australian rules footballer, born 1900

Personal information
- Full name: Edward Hanley
- Born: 20 May 1900; Tatura, Victoria
- Died: 5 May 1969 (aged 68); Randwick, New South Wales
- Original team: Numurkah

Playing career^{1}
Years	Club	Games (Goals)
1921	Richmond	1 (0)
- ^{1} Playing statistics correct to the end of 1921.

Eddie Hanley (20 May 1900 – 5 May 1969) was an Australian rules footballer who played with Richmond in the Victorian Football League (VFL).
