= Mark Whiley =

Australian rules footballer (born 1992)

Personal information
- Full name: Mark Whiley
- Born: 1 December 1992 (age 33)
- Original team: Finley/Murray Bushrangers (TAC Cup)
- Draft: 2010 NSW Zone Selection, Greater Western Sydney
- Height: 188 cm (6 ft 2 in)
- Weight: 90 kg (198 lb)
- Position: Midfielder

Playing career^{1}
| Years | Club | Games (Goals) |
| 2012–2014 | Greater Western Sydney | 12 (2) |
| 2015–2016 | Carlton | 9 (1) |
| Total | | 21 (3) |
- ^{1} Playing statistics correct to the end of 2016.

Mark Whiley (born 1 December 1992) is a former professional Australian rules footballer who played for the Greater Western Sydney Giants and Carlton Football Club in the Australian Football League (AFL).

Originally from Finley in the Riverina region of New South Wales, he played for the Murray Bushrangers in the TAC Cup prior to being recruited prior to the 2010 AFL draft as one of the new GWS club's NSW zone selections. Whiley made his AFL debut in Round 12 of the 2012 AFL season against Richmond, as a late replacement for Nick Haynes.

In October 2014, he was traded to the Carlton Football Club. Whiley made his debut for Carlton against Collingwood in Mick Malthouse's record breaking game of most games coached in round 5, 2015. At the conclusion of the 2016 season, he was delisted by Carlton.

Whiley currently plays for Ovens & Murray Football League club Yarrawonga, as of 2017.

== Statistics ==
Legend
| G | Goals | K | Kicks | D | Disposals | T | Tackles |
| B | Behinds | H | Handballs | M | Marks |

| Season | Team | No. | Games | Totals | | | | | | | Averages (per game) | | | | | | |
| Season | Team | No. | Games | G | B | K | H | D | M | T | G | B | K | H | D | M | T |
|---|---|---|---|---|---|---|---|---|---|---|---|---|---|---|---|---|---|
| 2012 | Greater Western Sydney | 42 | 3 | 0 | 0 | 20 | 15 | 35 | 15 | 5 | 0.0 | 0.0 | 6.7 | 5.0 | 11.7 | 5.0 | 1.7 |
| 2013 | Greater Western Sydney | 42 | 7 | 1 | 0 | 33 | 20 | 53 | 5 | 46 | 0.1 | 0.0 | 4.7 | 2.9 | 7.6 | 0.7 | 6.6 |
| 2014 | Greater Western Sydney | 42 | 2 | 1 | 0 | 20 | 16 | 36 | 10 | 11 | 0.5 | 0.0 | 10.0 | 8.0 | 18.0 | 5.0 | 5.5 |
| 2015 | Carlton | 24 | 8 | 1 | 2 | 46 | 49 | 95 | 17 | 33 | 0.1 | 0.3 | 5.8 | 6.1 | 11.9 | 2.1 | 4.1 |
| 2016 | Carlton | 24 | 1 | 0 | 0 | 8 | 8 | 16 | 2 | 1 | 0.0 | 0.0 | 8.0 | 8.0 | 16.0 | 2.0 | 1.0 |
| Career | | | 21 | 3 | 2 | 127 | 108 | 235 | 49 | 96 | 0.1 | 0.1 | 6.0 | 5.1 | 11.2 | 2.3 | 4.6 |
