= Jim McColl (footballer) =

Australian rules footballer

Personal information
- Full name: James Carvel McColl
- Born: 17 June 1933; Carlton, Victoria
- Died: 5 October 2013 (aged 80); Adelaide, South Australia
- Original teams: Geelong College, University Blacks, Dookie Agricultural College
- Height: 189 cm (6 ft 2 in)
- Weight: 89 kg (196 lb)
- Position: Key defender

Playing career^{1}
Years	Club	Games (Goals)
1954, 1957	Essendon	3 (0)
- ^{1} Playing statistics correct to the end of 1957.

James Carvel McColl, AO (17 June 1933 – 5 October 2013) was a distinguished contributor to Australian agricultural and resource-based industries and an Australian rules footballer who played with Essendon in the Victorian Football League (VFL).

== Family ==
James Carvel McColl was born in Carlton, Victoria in 1933, the second of three children of Norman and Christina McColl. He attended Essendon Grammar before becoming a boarder at the Geelong College, excelling in several sports. He graduated in Agricultural Science at the University of Melbourne in 1956 before joining the Victorian Department of Agriculture.

== Football ==
Jim McColl was a tall player and an aspirant for the centre half back position at Essendon, but only played a total of three senior games over four years. He finished third in the Gardiner Medal, awarded to the best and fairest player in the VFL reserves competition, in 1954 and in 1957 he won Essendon's reserves best and fairest award.

McColl also played in the country for City United in the Goulburn Valley Football League, and was captain-coach of Katamatite and Strathmerton.

== Agriculture ==
McColl's work in the fields of agricultural policy and water management led to a number of awards, including election in 1989 as a Fellow of the Australian Institute of Agriculture Scientists and Technologists and in 2010, Distinguished Fellow of the Australian Agricultural and Resource Economics Society. In 2005 Jim McColl was awarded the Eureka Prize for land and water research jointly with Professor Mike Young, University of Adelaide.

In 2013 McColl was appointed an Officer of the Order of Australia "for distinguished service to primary industry through policy and strategy advisory roles in the agricultural, fisheries and natural resource sector, and to conservation and the environment".
