= Des Martin =

Australian rules footballer, born 1913

Personal information
- Full name: Norman Desmond Martin
- Born: 2 August 1913; Sale, Victoria
- Died: 7 December 1985 (aged 72); Prahran, Victoria
- Original team: Frankston Bombers
- Height: 171 cm (5 ft 7 in)
- Weight: 73 kg (161 lb)

Playing career^{1}
Years	Club	Games (Goals)
1941–1942	South Melbourne	10 (6)
1942	Richmond	5 (5)
Total		15 (11)
- ^{1} Playing statistics correct to the end of 1942.

Norman Desmond Martin (2 August 1913 – 7 December 1985) was an Australian rules footballer who played with South Melbourne and Richmond in the Victorian Football League (VFL).

== Family ==
The youngest of 11 children born to Thomas Martin (1864–1937) and Ellen Martin (1867–1940), née Smith, Norman Desmond Martin was born in Sale, Victoria on 2 August 1913.

Des Martin married Ivy Jean Purdy on 27 December 1941.

== Football ==
=== Sale ===
Having commenced playing in the local Sale competition in 1933, Des Martin soon won a place in the Sale team competing in the Gippsland Football Association.

=== Frankston ===
In 1936, Martin moved to Frankston where he made an immediate impression and ended the season scoring four goals in a one-point loss to the Naval Depot team in the (Preliminary) Final of the Peninsula League. He was a leading player throughout 1937 before he was sidelined with injury for the 1938 season. Martin trained with South Melbourne before the 1939 season but he did not make the final list and he returned to Frankston.

In October 1940 Martin enlisted to service in the Royal Australian Air Force in World War II but was subsequently discharged due to a physical defect with his leg.

=== South Melbourne ===
Martin returned to South Melbourne in 1941 and after playing well in the reserves he made his debut in the middle of the 1941 VFL season. A rover and half forward, he played nine games that year.

Martin enlisted for a second time in early 1942, this time in the Australian Army, and had an operation to correct an issue in his leg. He was made captain of the South Melbourne seconds team but made one more appearance in the senior team in round 11 of the 1942 VFL season.

=== Richmond ===
Des Martin crossed over to Richmond in the middle of the 1942 season and he played five games for them, his final appearance being as a reserve for Richmond in the 1942 VFL Grand Final, which they lost to Essendon.

=== Berrigan ===
Martin joined the Berrigan Football Club in 1946 as captain-coach when he returned from war service.

He won the Murray Football League's best and fairest award, the O'Dwyer Medal in 1946 and was runner up in 1948, when playing for Berrigan. Martin won the Berrigan best and fairest award in 1948.

=== Minyip ===
In 1947, Martin coached Minyip Football Club in the Wimmera Football League.

=== Watchem ===
Martin was captain-coach of Watchem from 1950 to 1952.

=== Oakleigh ===
Martin was coach of the Oakleigh Under 19 side and lead them to premierships in 1953 and 1954.
