= Norm Betson =

Australian rules footballer

Personal information
- Full name: Norman Edward Betson
- Born: 8 July 1914; Shepparton, Victoria
- Died: 5 May 1988 (aged 73)
- Original teams: Miepoll, Culcairn, Albury
- Height: 193 cm (6 ft 4 in)
- Weight: 92 kg (203 lb)

Playing career^{1}
Years	Club	Games (Goals)
1940–1945	Essendon	78 (41)
- ^{1} Playing statistics correct to the end of 1945.

Norman Edward Betson (8 July 1914 – 5 May 1988) was an Australian rules footballer who played for Essendon in the Victorian Football League (VFL) during the early 1940s.

Before arriving at Essendon, Betson initially played with Miepoll, Albury and was captain-coach of New South Wales club Culcairn.

A follower, he played in Essendon's 1941 Reserves premiership and also appeared in six senior football finals for Essendon but missed out on a spot in their 1942 VFL premiership team, after only being named an emergency for the Grand Final. Betson did however participate in the 1943 VFL Grand Final and in the final seconds had a snap at goal which could have secured a draw, only to have the ball touched on the goal-line by a Richmond player.

Betson joined Glenelg in 1946 and spent much of his first year as captain-coach. He continued until 1949 just as a player but spent the 1948 season as captain. During this time, he represented the South Australians at interstate football. Betson then captain-coached Nathalia in 1950 and the following season played at Lemnos.

== Links ==
- Norm Betson's playing statistics from AFL Tables
