= Norm Smith (footballer, born 1946) =

Australian rules footballer (1946–2019)

Personal information
- Full name: Norman Smith
- Born: 1 October 1946
- Died: 21 February 2019 (aged 72); Canberra
- Original team: Strathmerton
- Height: 183 cm (6 ft 0 in)
- Weight: 86 kg (190 lb)
- Position: Ruck-rover

Playing career^{1}
Years	Club	Games (Goals)
1966	Strathmerton	
1967	Hawthorn	5 (1)
1968-1969	?	
1970–1971	Strathmerton	
1972–1974	Tatura	
1975–1976	Lemnos	
1977–1978	Corowa	
1979	Belconnen	
1980–1982	West Canberra	
- ^{1} Playing statistics correct to the end of 1982.

Career highlights
- Murray FL: O'Dwyer Medal – 1966; Goulburn Valley FL: Morrison Medal – 1974, 1975

Norman "Norm" Smith (1 October 1946 – 21 February 2019) was an Australian rules footballer who played with Hawthorn in the Victorian Football League (VFL).

== Early career and Hawthorn ==
Smith, a ruck-rover, played his early senior football at Strathmerton in the Murray Football League and won the league's best and fairest medal in 1966. The following year he made five VFL appearances for Hawthorn, then spent time away from the game on national service, before returning to Strathmerton in 1970.

== Goulburn Valley Football League ==
In 1971, Smith started playing in the Goulburn Valley Football League, where he won back-to-back Morrison Medals, with Tatura in 1974 and Lemnos in 1975.

== Ovens & Murray Football League ==
His two-year stint coaching Corowa, in 1977 and 1978, was the final two seasons that the club played in the Ovens & Murray Football League, before merging with Rutherglen.

== Canberra ==
In 1979 he coached Belconnen to its first Australian Capital Territory Football League grand final, which they lost to Ainslie. From 1980 to 1982, Smith played at West Canberra. He was coach in the last of those years and again for the 1985 season, in a non-playing capacity. In 1986 he was non-playing coach of the Belconnen Magpies, formed by a merger between Belconnen and West Canberra.

Brent Smith, Norman's son, also played football in Canberra and in 1991 won the Mulrooney Medal.
