= Peter Baldwin (footballer) =

Australian rules footballer

Personal information
- Born: 24 August 1968 (age 58)
- Original team: Finley
- Height: 183 cm (6 ft 0 in)
- Weight: 80 kg (176 lb)

Playing career^{1}
Years	Club	Games (Goals)
1987–1990	Geelong	5 (1)
- ^{1} Playing statistics correct to the end of 1990.

Peter Baldwin (born 24 August 1968) is a former Australian rules footballer who played with Geelong in the Victorian Football League (VFL).

Baldwin, originally from Finley, went to Assumption College. A wingman, Baldwin made two appearances late in the 1987 VFL season, then struggled with injuries, before returning to the seniors in 1990 and playing in the opening three rounds.

He went to North Melbourne in the 1991 Pre-Season Draft, but didn't play a league game for the club.
