= Moama Football Club =

Moama

Names
- Full name: Moama Football Netball Club
- Nickname(s): Magpies, Mowers

Club details
- Founded: 1892; 134 years ago
- Colours
- Competition: Murray FNL
- Chairperson: Matt Lake
- Coach: Sam Sheldon
- Grounds: Main Oval, Moama Recreation Reserve
- Jack Eddy Oval

Uniforms
Home

The Moama Football Netball Club, nicknamed the Magpies, is an Australian rules football and netball club based in the town of Moama located in the Riverina district of New South Wales. The club teams currently compete in the Murray FNL, which Moama joined in 1997.

The Moama Football Club has teams in leagues that range from Under 12s to Seniors. Their Under 14s team gained local publicity for winning four premierships back-to-back from 2012 to 2015. Under the coaching of Under 17s coach Adrian Daly, the under 17s have also won 4 premierships in a row spanning from 2013 to 2017 also several players have gone on to play for representative teams such as the New South Wales Rams and the Victoria Country squad.

Australian Test cricketer Todd Murphy played and captained for the club in his teenage years alongside playing cricket.

== Premierships ==
League	Total flags	Premiership year(s)
Echuca & Moama Football Association	1	1907
Northern Goulburn Valley Football League	1	1930
Echuca Football League	5	1965, 1966, 1968, 1972, 1981
Northern & Echuca Football League	2	1992, 1996
Murray Football League	1	2010

== Ground ==
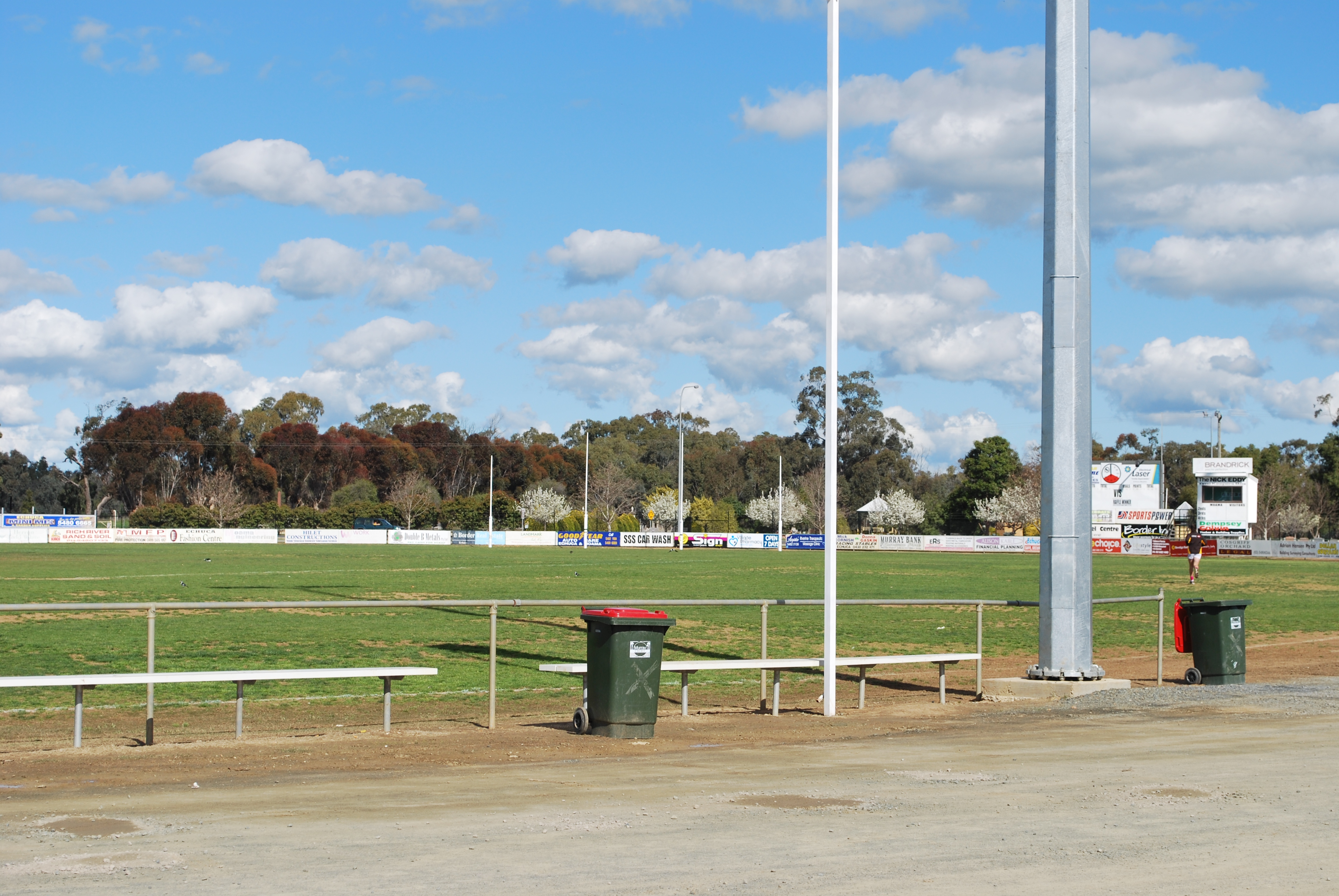
Jack Eddy Oval, home of the Moama Football Club
