= Steve Reynoldson =

Australian rules footballer

Personal information
- Full name: Stephen Reynoldson
- Born: 6 September 1962 (age 64)
- Original team: Strathmerton
- Height: 191 cm (6 ft 3 in)
- Weight: 90 kg (198 lb)

Playing career^{1}
Years	Club	Games (Goals)
1981–1986	Geelong	84 (70)
1987–1991	Brisbane Bears	58 (17)
Total		142 (87)
- ^{1} Playing statistics correct to the end of 1991.

Steve Reynoldson (born 6 September 1962) is a former Australian rules footballer who played with Geelong and the Brisbane Bears in the Victorian/Australian Football League (VFL/AFL).

Reynoldson, recruited from Strathmerton, was a centre half-forward who kicked 23 goals for Geelong in 1981. He played well in their qualifying final win over Collingwood that season with 17 disposals, eight marks and two goals.

After six years at Geelong, Reynoldson joined the Brisbane Bears for their first league season in 1987. He was appointed deputy vice-captain and was used as a centre half-back by the Bears. He played in the first 18 rounds for the Bears in their inaugural season and was their second best performers in the Brownlow Medal with eight votes. In 1989 he was Brisbane's first ruckman for much of the year as Mark Mickan struggled with injuries and he took 123 marks, the most by a Bears player.
