= Brendan Parker =

Australian rules footballer

Brendon Parker

Personal information
- Full name: Brendon Parker
- Born: 23 March 1971 (age 55)
- Original team: Nathalia/Tongala
- Height: 182 cm (6 ft 0 in)
- Weight: 84 kg (185 lb)
- Position: Centre half forward

Playing career^{1}
Years	Club	Games (Goals)
1992–1993	Carlton	5 (3)
- ^{1} Playing statistics correct to the end of 1993.

Brendon Parker (born 23 March 1971) is a former Australian rules footballer who played with Carlton in the Australian Football League (AFL).

A centre half forward from Nathalia in the Murray Football League, Parker moved to Tongala in 1991 and won the Morrison Medal, Goulburn Valley Football League best and fairest in his first season.

He was subsequently drafted by Carlton. Given limited senior opportunities in his two seasons with the Blues, Parker only managed five AFL games despite playing well in the reserves where he kicked 90 goals from 35 matches.

After being delisted at the end of 1993, Parker moved to play for North Adelaide in the South Australian National Football League. He played over 100 games for North Adelaide between 1995 and 1999.

Parker then returned to coach Tongala for two seasons, then moving onto Geelong Football League team, Newtown Chilwell before coming back home Nathalia in 2004, where he won four Murray Football League premierships and kicked over 100 goals in four consecutive seasons.
