= Brad Stephens =

Australian rules footballer

Personal information
- Full name: Brad Stephens
- Born: 11 July 1979 (age 47)
- Original teams: Barooga, Murray Bushrangers (TAC Cup)
- Draft: No. 27, 1997 AFL draft

Playing career^{1}
Years	Club	Games (Goals)
2000	North Melbourne	2 (0)
- ^{1} Playing statistics correct to the end of 2012.

Brad Stephens (born 11 July 1979) is a former Australian rules footballer who played with North Melbourne in the Australian Football League (AFL) in 2000.
