= Numurkah Football Club =

Numurkah

Names
- Full name: Numurkah Football Netball Club
- Nickname: Blues
- Motto: "Bleed Blue"
- Club song: 'Old Dark Navy Blues'
- Home-and-away season: 3rd
- Leading goalkicker: Nathan Hicks

Club details
- Founded: 1882; 144 years ago
- Colours
- Competition: Murray FNL
- President: John Beitzel
- Coach: Sean Harrap
- Premierships: (13): 1932, 1933, 1937, 1938, 1950, 1951, 1953, 1962, 1970, 1977, 1979, 1999, 2000
- Ground: Numurkah Showgrounds

Uniforms
Home

The Numurkah Football Club, nicknamed the Blues, is an Australian rules football and netball club based in the town of Numurkah located in north east Victoria.

The club teams currently competes in the Murray FNL, which Numurkah (established in 1882) was a founding member in 1931.

== Football Premierships ==
Seniors

- Goulburn Valley Football Association (8)
  - 1888, 1889, 1890, 1920, 1922, 1924, 1925, 1926
- Murray Football League (13):
  - 1932, 1933, 1937, 1938, 1950, 1951, 1953, 1962, 1970, 1977, 1979, 1999, 2000

Reserves

?

== M. D. O'Dwyer Medallists (Murray FL – League Best & Fairest) ==
- 1934 – George Bourke (Joint Winner)
- 1935 – George Bourke
- 1938 – George Bourke
- 1939 – George Bourke. (In 1946, George Bourke won the Lismore Football League best & fairest award too)
- 1946 – Merv Dudley (Joint Winner)
- 1949 – Syd Stewart
- 1950 – Syd Stewart
- 1952 – V.T. Davies
- 1970 – Peter Dealy (23 votes)
- 1981 – G. Ralph (18 votes)

== Les Mogg Perpetual Trophy Winners (Leading Goalkicker) ==
- 1965 – Darryl Twitt (82 goals)
- 1966 – Darryl Twitt (93 goals)
- 1967 – Darryl Twitt (71 goals)
- 1968 – Darryl Twitt (62 goals)
- 1977 – D. Rudd (55 goals)
- 1994 – Perry Meka (102 goals)
- 1995 – Perry Meka (95 goals)

== Numurkah FC players who played in the VFL ==
The following players played with Numurkah, prior to playing senior football in the VFL, with the year indicating their VFL debut.

- 1904 – Bill Payne – Carlton
- 1905 – Dave McNamara – St. Kilda
- 1906 – Alf George – Essendon & Melbourne
- 1909 – Joe Richie – St. Kilda
- 1909 – Duncan McIvor – Collingwood
- 1921 – Eddie Hanley – Richmond
- 1923 – Bob McCaskill – Richmond
- 1932 – Jock Fahey – South Melbourne
- 1940 – Merv Dudley – South Melbourne
- 1967 – Reg Sanders – North Melbourne
- 1981 – Phillip Harrison – Geelong
- 1984 – David Simpson – Geelong

== AFL drafted players ==
- 1990 – Adam Rudd (1990 National Draft – # 91) St Kilda – 0 games
- 1997 – Mark Brown (1997 Rookie Draft – # 10) Sydney – 0 games
