= Les Mogg =

Australian rules footballer (1929–2012)

Personal information
- Full name: Leslie Thomas Mogg
- Born: 27 August 1929
- Died: 2 May 2012 (aged 82); Cobram
- Original team: St Pat's Ballarat
- Height: 180 cm (5 ft 11 in)
- Weight: 76 kg (168 lb)

Playing career^{1}
Years	Club	Games (Goals)
1947-48	Commonwealth Bank	
1949–1954	North Melbourne	75 (41)
- ^{1} Playing statistics correct to the end of 1954.

Leslie Thomas "Les" Mogg (27 August 1929 – 2 May 2012) was an Australian rules footballer who played with North Melbourne in the Victorian Football League (VFL).

Mogg came to North Melbourne from Ballarat and was a regular member of the team from the second half of the 1950 season. He was a wingman for North Melbourne in the 1950 VFL Grand Final.

Also used as a half forward flanker during his career, Mogg kicked 16 goals in 1952. Injuries restricted him to just five games in 1953 but he played all but two of North Melbourne's matches the following year.

He left the club after the 1954 season to take up the position of captain-coach for Cobram Football Club in the Murray Football League (MFL).

In 1955, his first season, he led Cobram to a grand final win and captain-coached them to three further premierships, all in succession, from 1959 to 1961.

As a player, he had a particularly strong season in 1961, winning the O'Dwyer Medal as the league's "Best and Fairest". He topped the Murray FL goal-kicking that year as well, with 85 goals. It was the second time he had won the goal-kicking award, which is now named after him, having also kicked a league record 132 goals in 1960, 148 after finals.

He also had the distinction of being the captain-coach of the MFL combined team which upset VFL club St Kilda by 14 points in a 1960 practice match. It is believed to have been the first time since 1914 that a country side had beaten a VFL team.
