= Sam Snell =

Australian rules footballer

Personal information
- Full name: Sam Snell
- Born: 8 May 1911
- Died: 26 June 2002 (aged 91)
- Original team: Barooga
- Height: 185 cm (6 ft 1 in)
- Weight: 78 kg (172 lb)

Playing career^{1}
Years	Club	Games (Goals)
1936–1945	St Kilda	93 (21)
- ^{1} Playing statistics correct to the end of 1945.

Sam Snell (8 May 1911 – 26 June 2002) was an Australian rules footballer who played with St Kilda in the Victorian Football League (VFL).

Snell, who was from Barooga in New South Wales, played much of his football at St Kilda as a centre half-back. He received eight Brownlow Medal votes in 1939.

After appearing in the opening round of the 1940 VFL season, Snell didn't play at all for the next four years. During that time he worked as a police constable and in 1942 was awarded a bronze medal from the Royal Humane Society after seizing the reins of two horses that had bolted from a delivery van on the busy Bourke Street, Melbourne.

He returned to the side in 1944. The following year spent some time up forward and was St Kilda's joint leading goal-kicker with 21 goals, the only goals on his career. He transferred to Preston in 1946.
