= Daryl Mares =

Australian rules footballer

Personal information
- Full name: Daryl Mares
- Born: 3 October 1946 (age 80)
- Original team: Strathmerton
- Height: 174 cm (5 ft 9 in)
- Weight: 75 kg (165 lb)

Playing career^{1}
Years	Club	Games (Goals)
1965, 1967	Hawthorn	5 (4)
- ^{1} Playing statistics correct to the end of 1967.

Daryl Mares (born 3 October 1946) is a former Australian rules footballer who played with Hawthorn in the Victorian Football League (VFL).
