= Merv Dudley =

Australian rules footballer, born 1917

Personal information
- Full name: Mervyn William Dudley
- Born: 31 May 1917; Wunghnu, Victoria
- Died: 22 April 2013 (aged 95)
- Original team: Numurkah (MFL)
- Height: 189 cm (6 ft 2 in)
- Weight: 83 kg (183 lb)

Playing career^{1}
Years	Club	Games (Goals)
1940	South Melbourne	3 (7)
1943–45	Footscray	30 (10)
Total		33 (17)
- ^{1} Playing statistics correct to the end of 1945.

Mervyn William Dudley (31 May 1917 – 22 April 2013) was an Australian rules footballer who played with South Melbourne and Footscray in the Victorian Football League (VFL).

Dudley returned to the Numurkah Football Club as captain / coach in 1946 and won the 1946 Murray Football League best and fairest award, the O'Dwyer Medal.
