= Darren R. Jackson =

Darren Jackson (born 1964) became the chief executive officer of Advance Auto Parts on January 7, 2008.

== Early years and education ==
Jackson earned his degrees in accounting and business administration from Marquette University in Milwaukee.

== Career ==
In 1989, Jackson began his career with Carson Pirie Scott (CPS) in Milwaukee. From September 1990 until June 1992 he was director of treasury services at CPS. Jackson served as treasurer from June 1992 until August 1995. From August 1992 until February 1997 he served as vice president. He was the chief financial officer of CPS & Co from 1995 until 1998, as well as serving as the senior vice president from February 1997 until he left in 1998.

In 1998 he moved to Nordstrom Inc, where he served as chief financial officer of the Full-Line Store division.

In 2000 Jackson moved to Best Buy Co, where he was senior vice president of finance and treasurer. In 2001 he was named executive vice president, finance and chief financial officer. Jackson led Best Buy's entertainment, PC mobility and home solutions operating groups as the executive vice president of Customer Operation Groups. He also supervised Best Buy Financial Services, Best Buy for Business, Magnolia Audio Video and Pacific Sales. In 2007 Jackson began transitioning to become the president and CEO of Advance Auto Parts, Inc.

Jackson was president and chief executive officer of Advance Auto Parts from January 2008 until current. Retiring 2016 He was already a member of the Advance Auto Parts board of directors since 2004, and remained on the board after his appointment as CEO and president.

== Recognition ==
Institutional Investor Magazine called Jackson one of the "most admired CFOs in America", and he was named one of the top 20 young chief financial officers by CFO Magazine. Jackson received the “Spirit of Marquette Award” in 2003 for his accomplishments as a Marquette graduate under 40 years old.

== Other affiliations ==
Jackson serves as vice chairman of the board of trustees of Marquette University and also sits on the board of the Cristo Rey Network Jesuit High School in Minneapolis. In 2004 Jackson was elected to the Marquette University board of trustees. He served as vice chair from 2006 until 2009, and chairman from 2009 until 2012. He is currently chairman of the board of Cree, Inc. and a board member of the Fastenal Company. Jackson is a member of the Marquette University Archbishop Henni Founders Society as well as the Marquette University President's Society.

== Personal ==
Since 1988, Jackson has been married to Theresa (Hall) and has three children: Ryan Jackson, Bridget Jackson, and Daniel Jackson.
