= Joe Ritchie (footballer) =

Australian rules footballer (1886–1975)

Personal information
- Full name: Joseph Duncan Ritchie
- Born: 26 September 1886; Numurkah, Victoria
- Died: 24 May 1975 (aged 88); Henty, New South Wales
- Original teams: Numurkah, Drumanure

Playing career^{1}
| Years | Club | Games (Goals) |
| 1909 | St Kilda | 7 (3) |
- ^{1} Playing statistics correct to the end of 1909.

Joseph Duncan Ritchie (26 September 1886 – 24 May 1975) was an Australian rules footballer who played with St Kilda in the Victorian Football League (VFL).

== Family ==
The son of Joseph Duncan Ritchie (1848–1922), and Mary Jane Ritchie (1855–1937), née Tawse, Joseph Duncan Ritchie was born in Numurkah on 26 September 1886.

He married Alice May Coles (1893–1975) in 1917.

== Football ==
Ritchie was recruited from the Drumanure Football Club, in the Goulburn Valley Football Association (GVFA), after he was best on ground in Drumanure's 1908 GVFA grand final win against the Muckatah Football Club.
