= Bill Scanlan =

Australian rules footballer

Personal information
- Full name: William Scanlan
- Born: 6 January 1925; Sandringham, Victoria
- Died: 10 September 2000 (aged 75)
- Original team: Sandringham Centrals
- Height: 187 cm (6 ft 2 in)
- Weight: 85 kg (187 lb)
- Position: Defence / Ruck

Playing career^{1}
Years	Club	Games (Goals)
1943–48	Melbourne	51 (22)
1949–53	Footscray	72 (34)
Total		123 (56)
- ^{1} Playing statistics correct to the end of 1953.

William Scanlan (6 January 1925 – 10 September 2000) was an Australian rules footballer who played with Melbourne and Footscray in the Victorian Football League (VFL).

== Family ==
The son of Francis Scanlan (1885–1961) and Minnie Scanlan, née Coghlan (1892–1976), William Scanlan was born in Sandringham, Victoria on 6 January 1925. He was the older brother of fellow Melbourne and Footscray VFL player Frank Scanlan.

== War service ==
Scanlan served in the Royal Australian Air Force during World War II.
