= Frank Scanlan (footballer) =

Australian rules footballer

Personal information
- Full name: Francis Scanlan
- Born: 17 April 1926; Sandringham, Victoria
- Died: 21 December 2009 (aged 83)
- Original team: Sandringham Centrals
- Height: 178 cm (5 ft 10 in)
- Weight: 76 kg (168 lb)

Playing career^{1}
Years	Club	Games (Goals)
1943–44, 1947–48	Melbourne	33 (13)
1949	Footscray	18 (13)
Total		51 (26)
- ^{1} Playing statistics correct to the end of 1949.

Frank Scanlan (17 April 1926 – 21 December 2009) was an Australian rules footballer who played with Melbourne and Footscray in the Victorian Football League (VFL).

== Family ==
The son of Francis Scanlan (1885–1961) and Minnie Scanlan, nee Coghlan (1892–1976), Frank Scanlan was born in Sandringham, Victoria on 17 April 1926. He was the younger brother of fellow Melbourne and Footscray VFL player Bill Scanlan.

== Football ==
=== Melbourne ===
Scanlan made his Melbourne debut shortly after his 16th birthday, making him one of Melbourne's youngest ever senior players. He served in the Royal Australian Navy in World War II, missing the 1945 and 1946 seasons as a result.

=== Footscray ===
In 1949, Scanlan moved to Footscray along with his brother Bill Scanlan.

=== Port Fairy ===
After a year with Footscray, Scanlan was appointed as playing coach of Port Fairy where he both coached and played for two seasons.

=== Sandringham (VFA) ===
In 1952 Scanlan commenced pre-season training with Footscray but after failing to make the senior list he moved to Sandringham where he played for the 1952 VFA season.

=== Tocumwal ===
In 1953, Scanlan was appointed playing coach of Tocumwal in the Riverina district of New South Wales. He won the 1953 Murray Football League best and fairest award, the O'Dwyer Medal that year but Tocumwal narrowly lost the Grand Final to Numurkah.

In February 1954, Scanlan accepted the captain-coach role at [[Cobram Football Club|Cobram]] in the Murray Football League.

== Death ==
Francis Scanlan died on 21 December 2009 and was cremated at Springvale Botanical Cemetery.
