= Darren Jackson (fighter) =

British MMA fighter

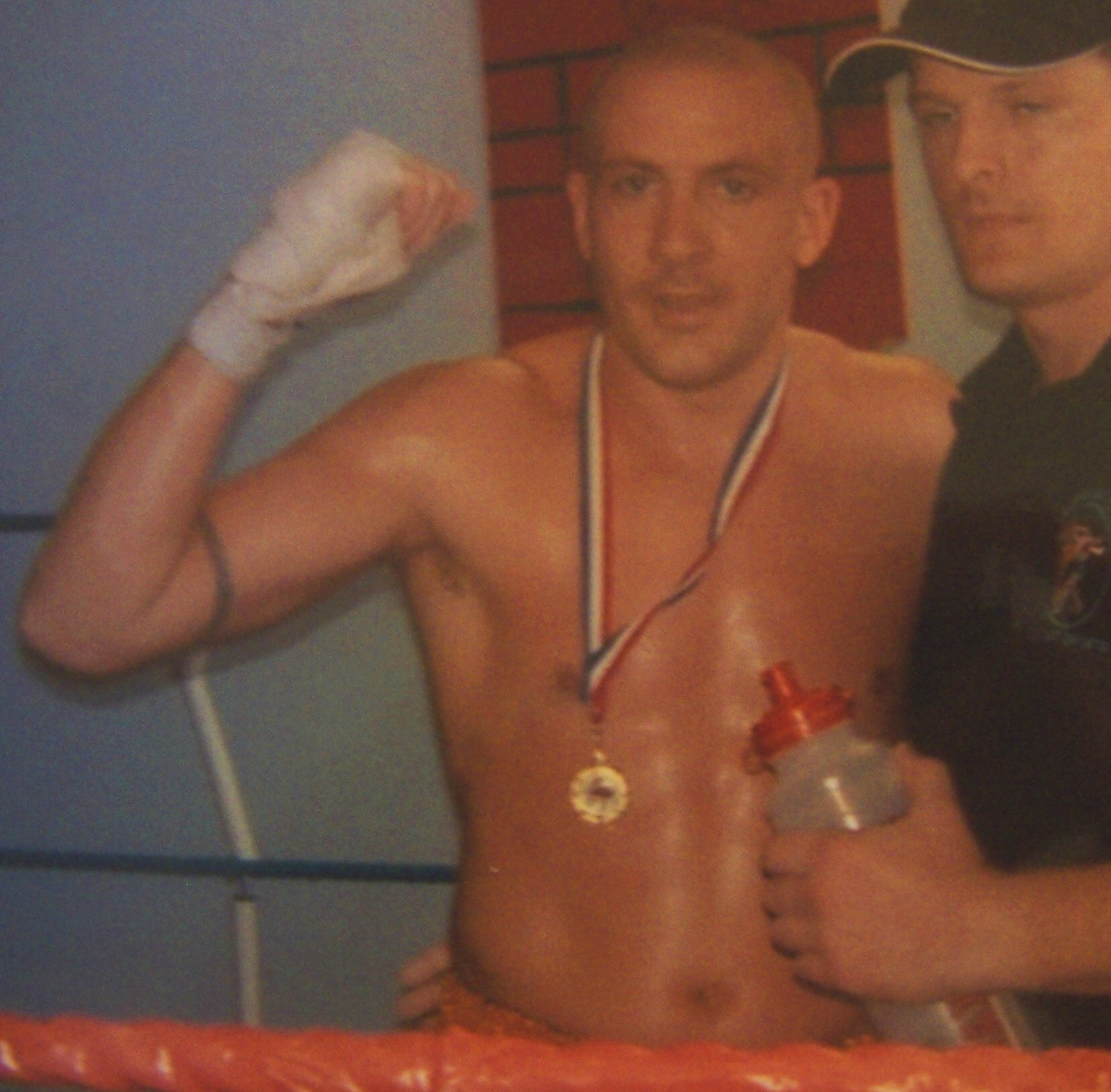
- Born: United Kingdom
- Other names: The Lamper
- Nationality: (United Kingdom) British
- Height: 5 ft 11 in (1.80 m)
- Weight: 170 lb (77 kg; 12 st)
- Style: Karate, Brazilian Jiu-Jitsu, Judo, Thai Boxing, Bare-knuckle boxing
- Fighting out of: United Kingdom

Mixed martial arts record
- Total: 13
- Wins: 6
- By knockout: 2
- By submission: 3
- Losses: 7
- Draws: 0
- No contests: 0

Darren Jackson is a retired British mixed martial arts fighter. He is best known for his appearances in the UK Mixed Martial Arts Championships (UKMMAC). Jackson has received training in various combat sports, and was featured in a 2004 issue of Fighters Magazine.

== Professional record ==
Prior to his involvement in mixed martial arts, Jackson fought in a number of unlicensed boxing matches and bare-knuckle brawls during the early portion of his career. In an interview, Jackson described his move to mixed martial arts as a progression from "unstructured" to structured combat. Jackson has promoted mixed martial arts as a safer alternative to boxing, due to the greater emphasis on wrestling and reduced reliance on hits to the head.

Jackson has fought in two professional events under the aegis of the United Kingdom Mixed Martial Arts Championships (UKMMAC). In his first fight at UKMMAC 6, he lost to Cameroonian kickboxer Fabrice Degund via an armbar submission in the second round; it was later revealed that Jackson suffered an elbow fracture during the bout. In Jackson's second fight at UKMMAC 8, he was defeated by Dennis Kelly an experienced fighter with 14 prior matches under his belt.

In March 2005, Jackson accepted a kickboxing fight on short notice against Geoff Dabbs in the 81 kg International Rules division. The matchup was part of the undercard of the International Kickboxing Federation world title bout between Mark Epstein and Alan Fenandes. Jackson ultimately lost the fight to Dabbs.

== Training ==
Jackson was among a handful of students who trained with Steve Morris, a karate trainer in Horsham, England. Jackson holds a black belt in karate and judo, and a brown belt in Brazilian jiu-jitsu.

In 2004, it was reported that Jackson had begun coaching at Valhalla Combat Club in Sittingbourne, Kent. Jackson coached several fighting styles at the club, including boxing, jujitsu, Muay Thai and wrestling. Jackson has also coached multiple fighters in boxing and mixed martial arts at the amateur and professional levels.

== Fight records ==
=== Professional mixed martial arts ===
Professional record breakdown
2 matches	0 wins	2 losses
By knockout	0	0
By submission	0	2
By decision	0	0
No contests	0	

Result	Record	Opponent	Method	Event	Date	Round	Time	Location	Notes
Loss	0-2	Dennis Kelly	Submission (armbar)	UKMMAC 8 - Unnatural Force	22 August 2004	1	1:43	Essex, England	
Loss	0-1	Fabrice Degund	Submission (armbar)	UKMMAC 6 - Extreme Warriors	29 February 2004	1	1:23	Essex, England	

=== Mixed martial arts ===
Date	Outcome	Opponent	Method	Event	Round, time
10 October 2004	Win	Charlie Kane	Submission	VH Extreme Brawl 8	
20 February 2005	Loss	Vinny Thompson	TKO	UK Fight Night	1, :59
12 June 2005	Loss	Simion Lees	KO (Knee)	Valhalla Extreme Brawl 9	1
16 July 2003	Win	Thommy Baker	Submission (Kimura)	Valhalla Ground & Pound	2, 2:07
1 October 2003	Win	Phil West	Submission (Guillotine Choke)	Valhalla trials	1, :36
26 November 2005	Loss	Ronnie Davis	Submission (Armbar)	Strike Force 4	1, 2:00
24 June 2004	Loss	Peter Jonson	Submission (Triangle Choke)	Last man standing	1, :44
25 January 2004	Loss	Jonny Smith	Submission (Choke)	Cage fighter	2, 4:35
21 April 2004	Win	Andy Simpson	KO (Spinning Back Fist)	Valhalla Belt Championships - Judgement Day	1, 3:20
14 July 2004	Win	Dean Stevens	Submission (Guillotine Choke)	Valhalla - Hard as Hell	2, 2:10
1 December 2004	Win	Dennis Jones	TKO (Doctor Stoppage)	Valhalla Combat 2	2, 3:39

== See also ==
- List of bare-knuckle boxers
- List of male mixed martial artists
