= Alan McAsey =

Australian rules footballer (1937–2019)

Personal information
- Full name: Alan Brian McAsey
- Born: 14 October 1937
- Died: 5 December 2019 (aged 82)
- Height: 178 cm (5 ft 10 in)
- Weight: 80 kg (176 lb)

Playing career^{1}
Years	Club	Games (Goals)
1958	Footscray	3 (2)
- ^{1} Playing statistics correct to the end of 1958.

Alan McAsey (14 October 1937 – 5 December 2019) was an Australian rules footballer who played for the Footscray Football Club in the Victorian Football League (VFL). He transferred to Williamstown in 1960 and played 80 games and kicked 61 goals up until the end of 1964, when he went to Finley as captain-coach. He played in the losing VFA grand finals of 1961 and 1964 against Yarraville and Port Melbourne, respectively. He was considered equal best first-year player in 1960 and was awarded the most consistent player in 1962. He was selected as ruck-rover in the Williamstown 1960's Team of the Decade.
