= Bernard Toohey =

Australian rules footballer

Personal information
- Full name: Bernard Toohey
- Born: 18 February 1963 (age 63)
- Original team: Barooga (PDFL)
- Height: 188 cm (6 ft 2 in)
- Weight: 85 kg (187 lb)

Playing career^{1}
| Years | Club | Games (Goals) |
| 1981 – 1985 | Geelong | 94 (35) |
| 1986 – 1991 | Sydney Swans | 129 (76) |
| 1992 – 1993 | Footscray | 40 (4) |
| Total | | 263 (115) |
- ^{1} Playing statistics correct to the end of 1993.

Bernard Toohey (born 18 February 1963) is a former Australian rules footballer who played during the 1980s and early 1990s as a defender.

Originally from Picola & District Football League (PDFL) club Barooga, Toohey started his career in 1981 with Geelong, where he played for five years. He then transferred to Sydney and earned All-Australian selection in 1987. Two years later, he spent half of the season at full-forward and was the Swans' leading goal-kicker.

Toohey finished his career at Footscray, retiring at the end of the 1992 AFL season.
