= Finley Football Club =

Australian rules football and netball club

Finley

Names
- Full name: Finley Football Netball Club
- Nickname(s): Cats

Club details
- Founded: c. late 19th. Century (Note: The date of foundation is unclear. Some sources state the club was established in the 1890s but there is no reliable evidence about that.)
- Colours
- Competition: Murray FNL
- President: Matt Clarke
- Coach: Ethan Reeves
- Premierships: (17): 1907, 1910, 1914, 1918, 1922, 1923 1926, 1927, 1929, 1930, 1952, 1954, 1958, 1971, 1981, 1982, 1988

Uniforms
Home

The Finley Football Club, nicknamed the Cats, is an Australian rules football and netball club based in the town of Finley located in the Riverina district of New South Wales.

The club's football and netball teams currently play in the playing in the Murray FNL, which Finley joined in 1933.

== History ==
Earliest mentions of the club in the local press appear in 1894 with its early success against the Berrigan Football Club.

The club held an Annual General Meeting in 1895 and entered the Murray Border Football Association, then in 1899 joined the Federal District Football Association .

Finley FC competed in the Southern Riverina Football Association from 1905 to 1931 and played in 16 grand finals in that period and winning 10 premierships.

Walter Barthelson, a 17 year old Finley footballer from "The Rocks", Tocumwal, New South Wales was injured whilst playing football in 1908 against Leniston and died after an abdominal operation the following day.

In 1915, Finley footballer, Sidney Jones was killed shortly after the outbreak of World War I.

Some players from Finley have risen to the major football league in the country, the Australian Football League (AFL), including –

- Shane Crawford
- Tom Hawkins.
- Allan Jeans (1955–59, 77 games for St Kilda and premiership coach of St Kilda 1966, premiership coach for Hawthorn 1983, 1986 & 1989),
- Jack Hawkins (1973–81, 182 games- Geelong),
- Darren Jackson and
- Bert Taylor (1934–36, 39 games- Melbourne)

Dan O'Bryan also played for the club in 2025.

== Football competitions timeline ==
Finley FC have played in the following competitions.

- 1895 – Murray Border Football Association
- 1896 – No official competitions?
- 1897 – No official competitions?
- 1898 – No official competitions?
- 1899 & 1900 – Federal Football Association
- 1901 – In recess. Refused entry into the Federal FA due to excess travel for other clubs.
- 1902 – No official competitions?
- 1903 – No official competitions?
- 1904 – No official competitions?
- 1905 – No official competitions?
- 1906 to 1932 – Southern Riverina Football Association
- 1933 to present – Murray Football League

== Premierships ==
Senior Football

- Southern Riverina Football Association (10):
  - 1907, 1910, 1914, 1918, 1922, 1923 1926, 1927, 1929, 1930
- Murray Football League (7):
  - 1952, 1954, 1958, 1971, 1981, 1982, 1988

== Runners Up ==
Senior Football

Southern Riverina Football Association (6)

- 1909, 1913, 1919, 1920, 1925, 1928.

Murray Football League (11)

- 1938, 1950, 1952, 1968, 1972, 1986, 1991, 1993, 2012, 2014, 2016.

== VFL / AFL Players ==
The following footballers, played with Finley prior to playing senior VFL / AFL football, with the year indicating their debut season.

- 1934: Bert Taylor – Melbourne
- 1947: Terry Walsh – North Melbourne
- 1955: Allan Jeans – St. Kilda. Later coached St.Kilda, Hawthorn & Richmond
- 1958: Jim Broockmann – Fitzroy
- 1971: Phil Baker - North Melbourne, Geelong
- 1973: Jack Hawkins – Geelong
- 1973: Michael Hawkins- Geelong
- 1984: Robb Hawkins – Geelong
- 1984: Darren Jackson – Geelong
- 1984: David Murphy - Sydney Swans
- 1987: Peter Baldwin- Geelong
- 1990: Damian Sexton – St. Kilda
- 1993: Shane Crawford – Hawthorn
- 2000: Marcus Baldwin - Geelong
- 2007: Tom Hawkins – Geelong
- 2012: Mark Whiley – Greater Western Sydney & Carlton
