= Darren Jackson (Australian footballer) =

Australian rules footballer (born 1961)

Personal information
- Born: 7 December 1961 (age 64)
- Original team: Finley (MFL)
- Height: 188 cm (6 ft 2 in)
- Weight: 79 kg (174 lb)

Playing career^{1}
Years	Club	Games (Goals)
1984	Geelong	2 (1)
- ^{1} Playing statistics correct to the end of 1984.

Darren Jackson (born 7 December 1961) is a former Australian rules footballer who played with Geelong in the Victorian Football League (VFL).

A full-forward from Finley, Jackson came to Geelong after winning the Murray Football League's leading goal-kicker award in 1983 with 150 goals. He made two senior appearances for Geelong in the 1984 VFL season, against Collingwood at Kardinia Park in round seven and Essendon at Waverley Park in round eight.

Jackson played 14 games with South Australian National Football League (SANFL) club South Adelaide in 1988.

Jackson went on to have a long and decorated career at Finley, being the Murray Football League leading-kicker a further three times, in 1986, 1989 and 1997. Jackson also finished second in the 1991 Murray Football League goalkicking award with 126 goals.

Jackson took on the role of Senior Coach for the Northern Jests (Ardlethan/Ariah Park/Mirrool) in the Farrer Football League in 2015 and 2016.
