= Barooga Football Club =

Barooga

Names
- Full name: Barooga Football Netball Club
- Nickname: Hawks
- Club song: "We are Maroon & Gold"

2021 season
- Home-and-away season: Finished 10th - Points-12 Wins-3 Losses-10 Draws-0 Percentage-78.38%

Club details
- Founded: 1894; 132 years ago
- Colours
- Competition: Murray FNL
- President: Marcus Fry
- Coach: Luke Jarjoura
- Premierships: 14 (senior football)
- Ground: Barooga Recreation Reserve

Uniforms
Home

Other information
- Official website: http://www.baroogafc.sportingpulse.net

The Barooga Football Netball Club, nicknamed the Hawks, is an Australian rules football and netball club based in the town of Barooga located in the Riverina district of New South Wales.

The club was formed in 1894 and initially played in the Murray Border Football Association in 1894.

When the club won the Federal District Football Association premiership against Cobram Football Club in 1897, they were known as "The Boomerangs" and wore a red and white uniform.

When Barooga FC re-formed in 1907 they wore an all-blue uniform in the Goulburn Valley Football Association in 1907 and 1908.

In 1911, the Boomanoomana Rovers Junior Football Club was established and played in the official Goulburn Valley Junior Football Association (GVJFA) and played their matches in Barooga and in the maroon and gold colours.

The Boomanoomana Rovers won the GVJFA premiership in 1913 and then entered a team in the Goulburn Valley Football Association senior football competition in 1914, then from 1919 to 1921.

Barooga FC were in recess in five separate periods in its early days, until 1929 when it joined the Southern Riverina Football Association for a two-year stint.

Barooga FC then became founding member of the new Murray Football League in 1931. In 1936 Cobram and Barooga football clubs merged and played as the Cobram Barooga United FC for a single season, before the club was officially disbanded in April 1937. The two clubs then reformed as independent bodies, with Cobram re-joining the Murray FL and Barooga joining the Southern Riverina FL.

The club moved across to the Picola & District league in 1959.

The club re-joined the Murray Football League in 1989 where it currently fields four football and eight netball teams each week.

== Barooga Football Competitions Timeline ==
Murray Border Football Association

- 1894

Barooga Football Club

- 1895 and 1896 – club in recess

Federal District Football Association

- 1897

Barooga Football Club

- 1898 and 1899 – club in recess

Federal District Football Association

- 1900

Barooga Football Club

- 1901 – club in recess

Federal District Football Association

- 1902

Barooga Football Club

- 1903 to 1906 – club in recess

Goulburn Valley Football Association

- 1907 to 1908

Barooga Football Club

- 1909 to 1928 – club in recess

Southern Riverina Football Association

- 1929 to 1930

Murray Football League

- 1931 to 1935

Murray Football League

- 1936 (Barooga & Cobram merge for 1936 & finish on the bottom)

Southern Riverina Football Association

- 1937 to 1938

Barooga Football Club

- 1939 to 1943 – Club in recess

Picola & District Football League

Barooga Football Club

- 1945 - Tocumwal Football Association

Barooga Football Club

- 1946 to 1958

Murray Football League Seconds Football Association

Barooga Football Club

- 1959 to 1988

Murray Football League

- 1989 to 2025

Barooga Football Club

- 2026 to present day

Picola & District Football League

== Football Premierships ==
Seniors

- Federal District Football Association (1)
  - 1897
- Murray Valley Football Second Eighteen Football Association (Barooga FC Seniors)
  - 1936 – Cobram / Barooga United FC
  - 1950, 1952, 1953, 1956 – Barooga FC
- Picola & District Football League (9):
  - 1960, 1961, 1976, 1978, 1979, 1981, 1982, 1986, 1987
- Murray Football League (4):
  - 1992, 1993, 1994, 1997

Reserves

- Picola & District Football League (3):
  - 1980, 1987, 1988

Thirds

- Picola & District Football League (4):
  - 1983, 1984, 1986, 1988

Fourths

- Picola & District Football League (11):
  - 1970, 1972, 1977, 1978, 1980, 1981, 1982, 1983, 1986, 1987, 1988

== League Best and Fairest ==
Senior Football

Barooga's first eighteen (senior) side played in the Murray Seconds Eighteen FA between 1946 and 1958.

- Murray Seconds Eighteen FA
  - 1951, 1952, 1953, 1958, - Vin Toohey
  - 1954, 1955, - Gerald O'Dwyer:
- Picola & District Football League
  - 1960, 1961 - Vin Toohey
  - 1968 - Doug Eddy
  - 1969 - Lance Lane
  - 1973 - Adrian Bennett
  - 1975 & 1976 - Robert McEwan
  - 1981 - Cameron Mattox
  - 1986 - David Brooks
- Murray Football League
  - 1990 - Peter Stevenson
  - 1992 - Kelly O'Donnell
  - 1993 & 1997 John Brunner
  - 1994 - Chris Foran
  - 2006 - Marty Brooks
  - 2007 - Matthew Byers
  - 2014 - Marcus Smith
  - 2018 - Brodie A'vard

Reserves

- Murray Football League
  - 2006 - Daryl Bowden

Thirds

- Murray Football League
  - 1998 - N McDonald
  - 2003 - Dylan Brooks

== VFL / AFL players ==
The following footballers played with Barooga prior to playing senior VFL / AFL football, with the year indicating their debut.

- 1926 – Stuart Russell – Essendon & Hawthorn
- 1936 – Sam Snell – St. Kilda
- 1981 – Bernard Toohey – Geelong, Sydney Swans & Footscray
- 1985 – Gerard Toohey – Geelong
- 1988 – John Brinkkotter – Sydney Swans
- 1990 – Chris O'Dwyer – Sydney Swans
- 2000 - Brad Stephens - North Melbourne
- 2002 – Chris Hyde – Richmond
