= Wayne Deledio =

Australian rules footballer

Personal information
- Full name: Wayne Edward Deledio
- Born: 29 November 1955 (age 70)
- Original team: Dunolly
- Height: 186 cm (6 ft 1 in)
- Weight: 86 kg (190 lb)

Playing career^{1}
Years	Club	Games (Goals)
1975	Carlton	1 (0)
- ^{1} Playing statistics correct to the end of 1975.

Wayne Edward Deledio (born 29 November 1955) is a former Australian rules footballer who played with Carlton in the Victorian Football League (VFL). Deledio later played for Brunswick in the Victorian Football Association.

His son Brett Deledio was the first pick in the 2004 AFL draft and went on to play 275 games for the Richmond Football Club and Greater Western Sydney Giants.
