= Murray Football Netball League =

Australian sports league

- Sport: Australian rules football Netball
- Founded: 1931; 95 years ago
- CEO: Dale Norman
- President: Julie Walsh
- No. of teams: 11
- Country: Australia
- Confederation: AFL Victoria Country
- Most recent champion: Congupna
- Most titles: Nathalia & Deniliquin (14)
- Sponsor: Eagle I T-L Irrigation
- Related competitions: VFL
- Website: Murray FNL

The Murray Football Netball League is an Australian rules football and netball league affiliated with the Victorian Country Football League. The league covers a large area of northern Victoria and southern New South Wales from Shepparton in the south to Deniliquin in the north. It covers much the same area as the Picola & District Football League but the teams tend to be based in the larger communities and towns.

== History ==
The "Murray Football League" (MFL) was established in 1931, when it superseded the old Goulburn Valley Football Association, with the following clubs, Barooga, Cobram, Numurkah, Strathmerton and Tocumwal.

Nathalia Football Club's admission into the MFL was initially rejected in 1931 by club delegates and they entered the Western and Moira Ridings Football Association. Berrigan, Finley and Nathalia's application for admission into the MFL in 1932 was rejected and they continued to play in their existing competitions. These three clubs were finally admitted into the MFL in 1933.

At a MFL club's delegates meeting in June, 1940, club's decided to abandoned the season and a motion was carried to conclude the season at the completion of the first round of MFL matches (Rd.7), after all teams had played each other once. Nathalia Football Club were undefeated when the season was officially abandoned in 1940.

Between 1941 and 1945 the league went into recess for World War II.

During its first 44 years, the league's administration was very stable, with only four presidents and three secretaries, with Mr. M D "Des" O'Dwyer presiding from 1931 to the late 1950s and Mr. Bill Limbrick of Katunga was secretary from 1949 to 1974 and Mr. D McClelland President from 1966 to 1974. The MFL played in the NSW Australian Football Championships in the mid-1970s. Long time secretary, Les Belt held office from 1930 to 1948.

The senior football goal kicking award was initially known as the Les Belt Trophy (MFL Secretary & donor) in the 1940s, before changing to the Les Mogg Perpetual Trophy in 1962, with Trevor Sutton – Deniliquin holding the record with 227 goals that he kicked in 1982, plus 22 goals in the finals for a total of 249 goals.

In 1958, Berrigan FC proposed that an official MFL Thirds competition be formed and that the Murray League Seconds Eighteen FA be taken over by the MFL. Both proposals were defeated, but the MFL Reserves competition went onto supersede the Murray League Seconds Eighteen FA for the start of the 1959 football season.

In July, 1960, the Murray FL senior football representative side (18.8 - 116), led by Les Mogg defeated St Kilda (15.14 - 104) at Tocumwal.

Former Jerilderie player, Bill Brownless kicked 148 goals and was runner up in the 1985 O’Dwyer Medal, before making his debut with Geelong Football Club in 1986.

In 1995 Cobram football and netball club won seniors, reserves, fourths, and all netball side grand finals. 9 out of 10 grand finals for the season.

Following the disbanding of the Echuca Football League, Echuca United and Moama joined the league in 1997.

In 2006 Tongala and Rumbalara made their debut with the league. Tongala was previously in the Goulburn Valley Football League and Rumbalara was in the now-defunct Central Goulburn Football League.

The 2008 premiership was won by Nathalia to complete 4 in a row premiership wins. Nathalia repeated this effort in 2018 and went one further in 2019, achieving 5 premierships a row.

Nathalia is the only team to complete 5 premierships in a row. Nathalia alongside Deniliquin are the only teams to complete 4 in a row with Nathalia achieving this feat twice.

In 2018 Tungamah, Shepparton East and Katandra joined the Murray Football League after leaving the new merging Picola & District Football League due to their affiliation dispute with AFL Goulburn Murray. Shepparton East moved onto the Kyabram & District Football League at the beginning of the 2019 season.

== Clubs ==
=== Current ===
Club	Colours	Nickname	Home Ground	Former League	Est.	Years in MFNL	MFNL Senior Premierships	
Club	Colours	Nickname	Home Ground	Former League	Est.	Years in MFNL	Total	Years
Cobram		Tigers	Scott Reserve, Cobram, Victoria	GVFA	1887	1937-	13	1931, 1947, 1948, 1955, 1959, 1960, 1961, 1969, 1974, 1984, 1995, 1998, 2025
Congupna		The Road	Congupna Recreation Reserve, Congupna, Victoria	TFL, GVFL	1956	1997-	2	2024, 2026
Deniliquin		Rams	Hardinge Street Oval, Deniliquin, New South Wales	EFL	1933	1949-	14	1957, 1966, 1972, 1973, 1975, 1976, 1985, 1986, 1996, 2001, 2002, 2003, 2004, 2011
Echuca United		Eagles	Echuca South Recreation Reserve, Echuca, Victoria	NEFL	1994	1997-	1	2013
Finley		Cats	Finley Recreation Reserve, Finley, New South Wales	SRFA	c.1890s	1933-	7	1952, 1954, 1958, 1971, 1981, 1982, 1988
Moama		Magpies	Moama Recreation Reserve, Moama, New South Wales	NEFL	1892	1997-	1	2010
Mulwala		Lions	Lonsdale Reserve, Mulwala, New South Wales	TFL	1882	1987-	3	1990, 2022, 2023
Nathalia		Purples	Nathalia Recreation Reserve, Nathalia, Victoria	PDFNL, TDFL	1887	1933-	14	1939, 1949, 1963, 1978, 2005, 2006, 2007, 2008, 2012, 2015, 2016, 2017, 2018, 2019
Numurkah		Blues	Numurkah Showgrounds, Numurkah, Victoria	GVFA	1882	1931-	13	1932, 1933, 1937, 1938, 1950, 1951, 1953, 1962, 1970, 1977, 1979, 1999, 2000
Rumbalara		Rumba	Rumbalara Recreation Reserve, Shepparton, Victoria	CGFL	1997	2006-	1	2014
Tongala		Blues	Tongala Recreation Reserve, Tongala, Victoria	GVFL	1894	2006-	0	–

=== Former clubs ===
Club	Colours	Nickname	Home Ground	Former League	Est.	Years in MFNL	MFNL Senior Premierships		Fate
Club	Colours	Nickname	Home Ground	Former League	Est.	Years in MFNL	Total	Years	Fate
Barooga		Hawks	Barooga Recreation Reserve, Barooga, New South Wales	PDFNL	1894	1931-1935, 1948-1958, 1989-2025	4	1992, 1993, 1994, 1997	Moved to Southern Riverina FA in 1936. Moved to Picola & District FNL in 1959 and 2026
Berrigan		Saints	Berrigan Recreation Reserve, Berrigan	SRFA	1891	1933-2002	5	1934, 1936, 1965, 1968, 1980	Moved to Picola & District FNL in 2003
Blighty		Redeyes	Blighty Recreation Reserve, Blighty	ERFL	1949	1955-1958, 1962-1963	0	–	Played in Edward River FL between 1959-61. Moved to Coreen & District FL in 1963
Coleambally		Blues	Coleambally Sports Grounds, Coleambally	B&DFL	c.1960s	1980-1983	0	–	Moved to Coreen & District FL in 1984
Jerilderie		Demons	Jerilderie Recreation Reserve, Jerilderie	SRFA, C&DFL	1891	1932-1956, 1964-1993	3	1983, 1987, 1989	Played in Coreen & District FL between 1957-63, returned there in 1994
Katamatite		Tigers	Katamatite Recreation Reserve, Katamatite	BMFL	1891	1940, 1946-1947	0	–	Moved to Picola & District FNL in 1947
Katandra		Kats	Katandra Recreation Reserve, Katandra West	PDFNL	1911	2018-2019	0	–	Returned to Picola & District FNL in 2021
Muckatah		Bombers	Yarroweyah Recreation Reserve, Yarroweyah, Victoria	KDFA	c.1880s	1932-1939	0	–	Folded
Shepparton East	(1962-67)(2018)	Eagles	Central Park Recreation Reserve, Shepparton East	KDFA, PDFNL	1924	1962-1967, 2018	0	–	Moved to Tungamah FL in 1968. Moved to Kyabram & District FNL in 2019
Strathmerton		Bulldogs	Strathmerton Recreation Reserve, Strathmerton	GVFA, PDFNL	1894	1931-1935, 1938-1993	2	1956, 1964	Moved to Picola & District FNL in 1936 and 1994
Tocumwal		Bloods	Tocumwal Recreation Reserve, Tocumwal	GVFA, PDFNL	1891	1931-2013, 2023	5	1935, 1946, 1967, 1991, 2009	Moved to Picola & District FNL in 2014 and 2024
Tungamah		Bears	Tungamah Recreation Reserve, Tungamah	PDFNL	1882	2018-2019	0	–	Returned to Picola & District FNL in 2021

== Senior Football Premierships ==
In 1938, Mr E Coxon of Numurkah donated a premiership trophy and whose sons Mick and Jack Coxon would later on donate the same trophy.

Year	Premiers	Score	Runners up	Score	Best on Ground	Captain	Coach	Venue	Gate	Comments
1931	Cobram	6.10 – 46	Strathmerton	3.11 – 29	No Award			Tocumwal		
1932	Numurkah	17.11 – 113	Cobram	11.4 – 70	N/A			Tocumwal	£50/18	
1933	Numurkah	13.16 – 94	Cobram	7.6 – 48	N/A			Strathmerton	£63	
1934	Berrigan	9.23 – 77	Cobram	7.11 – 55	N/A	C Milburn		Strathmerton	£58/11	
1935	Tocumwal	13.12 – 90	Berrigan	5.7 – 37	N/A		P Bolman	Finley	£100/12	
1936	Berrigan	14.14 – 98	Numurkah	11.5 – 71	N/A			Tocumwal	£100	
1937	Numurkah	10.7 – 67	Nathalia	8.13 – 61	N/A			Cobram	£111	
1938	Numurkah	6.15 – 45	Finley	4.10 – 34	N/A			Cobram	£145	
1939	Nathalia	12.15 – 85	Berrigan	11.10 – 76	N/A		B Head	Cobram	£116	
1940	1st: Nathalia	7 wins, 0 losses								MFL abandoned after Rd.7
1941										MFL in recess. WW2
1942										MFL in recess. WW2
1943										MFL in recess. WW2
1944										MFL in recess. WW2
1945										MFL in recess. WW2
1946	Tocumwal	7.14 – 56	Nathalia	5.3 – 33	N/A			Strathmerton	£272	
1947	Cobram	15.15 – 105	Numurkah	13.12 – 90	N/A	F Anderson	F Anderson	Strathmerton	£253	CFC undefeated in '47
1948	Cobram	10.12 – 72	Numurkah	8.13 – 61	N/A	F Anderson	F Anderson	Tocumwal	£245	
1949	Nathalia	12.6 – 78	Cobram	8.10 – 58	N/A	F Hamilton	F Hamilton	Tocumwal	£320	
1950	Numurkah	11.13 – 79	Finley	11.8 – 74	Lyn Thorton (N)	Syd Stewart	Syd Stewart	Tocumwal	£460	
1951	Numurkah	16.22 – 118	Nathalia	7.8 – 50	N/A	Syd Stewart	Syd Stewart	Tocumwal	£476	
1952	Deniliquin	10.9 – 69	Finley	9.15 – 69	N/A			Tocumwal	£872/5	Drawn Grand Final
	Finley	10.17 – 77	Deniliquin	11.5 – 71	N/A			Tocumwal	£733	Grand Final Replay
1953	Numurkah	6.14 – 50	Tocumwal	6.11 – 47	N/A			Tocumwal		Crowd: 2929
1954	Finley	13.13 – 91	Tocumwal	7.8 – 50	N/A			Tocumwal	£670	
1955	Cobram	17.11 – 113	Berrigan	10.17 – 77	N/A	Les Mogg	Les Mogg	Tocumwal	£750	
1956	Strathmerton	7.7 – 49	Tocumwal	6.6 – 42	N/A			Tocumwal	£720	
1957	Deniliquin	9.10 – 64	Cobram	4.15 – 39	N/A		Peter O'Donohue	Tocumwal	£1003	
1958	Finley	8.10 – 58	Deniliquin	7.11 – 53	N/A			Tocumwal	£875	
1959	Cobram	9.11 – 65	Deniliquin	6.5 – 35	N/A	Les Mogg	Les Mogg	Tocumwal	£875	
1960	Cobram	7.13 – 55	Strathmerton	3.6 – 24	N/A	Les Mogg	Les Mogg	Tocumwal	£824	
1961	Cobram	8.7 – 55	Deniliquin	6.8 – 44	N/A	? Mogg didn't play in GF	Les Mogg	Tocumwal	£1150	
1962	Numurkah	8.4 – 52	Deniliquin	3.10 – 28	N/A			Tocumwal	£435	
1963	Nathalia	11.10 – 76	Deniliquin	9.10 – 64	N/A			Tocumwal		
1964	Strathmerton	16.13 – 109	Numurkah	9.9 – 63	N/A	Lance Oswald	Lance Oswald	Tocumwal		
1965	Berrigan	9.14 – 68	Tocumwal	9.6 – 60	Russ Milne (B)	Gerald Eastmure	Gerald Eastmure	Cobram		£797
1966	Deniliquin	9.10 – 64	Tocumwal	7.6 – 48	N/A		Graham Ion	Cobram	$1620	decimal currency commenced
1967	Tocumwal	11.10 – 76	Cobram	7.13 – 55	N/A		Don Whitten	Finley	$1310	
1968	Berrigan	12.13 – 85	Finley	8.6 – 54	N/A		Gerald Eastmure	Tocumwal	$842	
1969	Cobram	9.11 – 65	Jerilderie	9.5 – 59	N/A		J Murton	Tocumwal	$1060	
1970	Numurkah	12.24 – 96	Berrigan	8.11 – 59	N/A			Tocumwal	$1411	
1971	Finley	13.11 – 89	Deniliquin	8.9 – 57	N/A		Wally Mumford	Tocumwal	$1658	
1972	Deniliquin	12.17 – 89	Finley	9.11 – 65	N/A	Ray Murphy	Ray Murphy	Cobram	$1770	
1973	Deniliquin	18.16 - 124	Cobram	10.6 - 66	N/A	Ray Murphy	Ray Murphy	Tocumwal	$1720	
1974	Cobram	13.13 - 91	Deniliquin	11.12 - 78	N/A			Tocumwal	$1610	
1975	Deniliquin	15.18 – 108	Strathmerton	5.8 – 38	N/A	Ray Murphy	Ray Murphy	Tocumwal	$2248	
1976	Deniliquin	16.11 – 107	Jerilderie	12.4 – 76	N/A	Ray Murphy	Ray Murphy	Tocumwal	$2600	
1977	Numurkah	11.14 - 80	Deniliquin	8.9 - 57	N/A		Don Rudd	Tocumwal	$3840	
1978	Nathalia	16.7 – 103	Deniliquin	9.16 – 70	N/A		Denis Higgins	Tocumwal	$3880	
1979	Numurkah	14.11 – 95	Berrigan	7.17 – 59	N/A			Tocumwal	$5092	
1980	Berrigan	19.19 – 133	Nathalia	19.12 – 126	N/A			Tocumwal	$5485	
1981	Finley	16.7 – 103	Numurkah	10.8 – 68	N/A			Tocumwal	$7676	
1982	Finley	22.8 - 140	Cobram	12.9 - 81	first awarded in '83			Tocumwal	$8242	
1983	Jerilderie		Deniliquin		Michael Gilmore (J)			Tocumwal	$8930	
1984	Cobram	15.13 – 103	Deniliquin	15.8 – 98	Brian Bourke (D)			Tocumwal	$7499	
1985	Deniliquin		Jeriliderie		Brian Bourke (D)	Greg Danckert	Greg Danckert	Tocumwal	$15063	
1986	Deniliquin	15.5 – 95	Finley	6.11 – 47	Robb Hawkins (F)	Greg Danckert	Greg Danckert	Tocumwal	$10520	
1987	Jerilderie		Deniliquin		Russell Jeffrey (J)			Tocumwal	$16200	
1988	Finley	12.17 – 89	Jerilderie	4.8 – 32	Michael Taylor (F)		Robb Hawkins	Tocumwal	$12518	
1989	Jerilderie		Tocumwal		Russell Jeffrey (J)			Tocumwal	$16125	
1990	Mulwala	12.18 – 90	Tocumwal	11.13 – 79	Phil Goode (M)		Peter Seymour	Tocumwal	$19510	
1991	Tocumwal		Finley		Stuart Roe (T)			Tocumwal	$16955	
1992	Barooga	12.15 - 87	Cobram	8.11 - 59	Kelly O’Donnell (B)		Glen Carroll	Tocumwal	$16300	
1993	Barooga		Finley		John Brunner (B)		Glen Carroll	Tocumwal	$14273	
1994	Barooga	24.15 - 159	Deniliquin	10.9 - 69	John Brunner (B)		Glen Carroll	Tocumwal	$12142	
1995	Cobram		Deniliquin		George Nicolopoulos (C)			Tocumwal	$14032	
1996	Deniliquin	9.16 - 70	Barooga	8.11 - 59	Ashley Connick (D)		Trevor Morris	Tocumwal	$13561	
1997	Barooga		Nathalia		John Brunner (B)		A Tranter	Tocumwal	$17967	
1998	Cobram	14.14 – 98	Congupna	9.11 – 65	Mark Brown (C)		Don Rudd	Tocumwal	$21968	
1999	Numurkah	14.14 – 98	Deniliquin	7.10 – 52	Luke Cowan (N)			Tocumwal	$18103	
2000	Numurkah	17.12 – 114	Deniliquin	10.7 – 67	Rob McCartney (N)		Rob McCartney	Tocumwal	$24702	
2001	Deniliquin	13.13 – 91	Moama	9.4 – 54	Leigh Marshall (D)		Gary Parsons	Tocumwal	$19354	
2002	Deniliquin	19.13 – 127	Mulwala	12.10 – 82	Andrew May (D)		Gary Parsons	Tocumwal	$27550	
2003	Deniliquin	19.6 - 120	Tocumwal	8.7 - 55	Ben Seignor (D)		Gary Parsons	Tocumwal	$32461	
2004	Deniliquin	15.7 – 97	Nathalia	8.6 – 54	Leigh Marshall (D)		Gary Parsons	Tocumwal	$32386	
2005	Nathalia	11.11 – 77	Tocumwal	3.6 – 24	Ryan Butler (N)	Adam Quarrell	J Nihill	Tocumwal	$36820	
2006	Nathalia	16.14 – 110	Echuca United	7.9 – 51	Nathan Gemmill (N)	Ashley Gemmill	B Smith	Tocumwal	$36899	
2007	Nathalia	18.10 – 118	Barooga	11.6 – 72	Drew Barnes (N)	Ashley Gemmill	Marc Quarrell	Tocumwal	$35990	
2008	Nathalia	16.10 – 106	Barooga	9.9 – 63	Troy Snelson (N)	Nathan Gemmill	Marc Quarrell	Tocumwal	$35918	
2009	Tocumwal	16.10 – 106	Moama	15.10 – 100	Anthony Mellington (T)	Anthony Mellington	Stuart Roe	Tocumwal	$46250	
2010	Moama	19.15 – 129	Mulwala	6.10 – 46	Levi Moss (M)	Luke Eldridge	Shannon Keam	Tocumwal	$38130	
2011	Deniliquin	11.12 – 78	Cobram	8.20 68	Troy Bartlett (D)	Anthony Bull	Gary Parsons	Tocumwal	$38,855	
2012	Nathalia	16.11 – 107	Finley	13.16 – 94	Jason Limbrick (N)	Ross Garner/Ben Hitchcock	Adam Quarrell	Tocumwal	$40,907	
2013	Echuca United	18.12 – 120	Mulwala	8.10 – 58	Scott Beattie (EU)	Rowan Priest/Craig Frost	Scott Beattie	Tocumwal	$39,005	
2014	Rumbalara	11.11 – 77	Finley	10.12 – 72	Levi Power (R)	Damian Cupido	Damian Cupido	Moama	$48,620	
2015	Nathalia	13.9 – 87	Moama	12.12 – 84	Lachlan Schultz (M)	Jarrod Maskell	Jason Limbrick	Moama	$58156	
2016	Nathalia	11.11 – 77	Finley	11.8 – 74	Brett Vallender (N)	Jarrod Maskell	Craig Kellow	Moama	$56,145	
2017	Nathalia	10.7 – 67	Numurkah	7.15 – 57	Jason Limbrick (N)	Jarrod Maskell	Craig Kellow	Rumbalara	$48,155	
2018	Nathalia	13.8 – 86	Barooga	7.6 – 48	Tom Nihill (N)	Tom Nihill	Craig Kellow	Rumbalara		
2019	Nathalia	13.8 – 86	Tongala	5.11 – 41	Bailey Bell (N)	Tom Nihill	Malcom Barnes	Finley		
2020										In recess COVID-19
2021	1st: Tongala	13 wins, 0 losses	2nd: Cobram	11 wins, 2 losses						No finals series COVID-19
2022	Mulwala	7.5 – 47	Cobram	6.8 – 44	Matt Gorman (M)	Jackson Gash	Rohan Davies	Moama		
2023	Mulwala	14.14 – 98	Congupna	9.11 – 65	Ron Middleton (M)	Dylan McNamara	Rohan Davies	Moama	$64,638	
2024	Congupna	9.11 – 65	Finley	9.10 – 64	Sam Buxton (C)	Daniel Schaper	Ben Bingham	Moama	$80,850	
2025	Cobram	8.6 – 54	Congupna	5.21 – 51	Luca Allen (C)	Samuel Beasley	Mark Meyland	Moama	$75,680	
2026	Congupna	14.6-90	Cobram	11.16 - 82	Bryden Squire	Daniel Schaper	Ben Bingham	Moama	$84,433	
Year	Premiers	Score	Runners up	Score	Best on Ground	Captain	Coach	Venue	Gate	Comments

== Reserves Football Premierships ==
In 1946, the Jerilderie Herald and Urana Advertiser was writing this competition up as the – Murray League Second Eighteen Football Association. This competition was later referred to as the Seconds Eighteen Football Association and then the Murray Football League Seconds Football Association. The MFL Reserves competition went onto supersede the Murray League Seconds Eighteen FA for the start of the 1959 football season. Grand Finals scores were –

- 1937 - Cobram/Barooga United: 8.9 - 57 d Jerilderie: 7.3 - 45
- 1946 – Tocumwal: 9.13 – 67 defeated Jerilderie: 4.10 – 34
- 1947 – Berrigan: 9.11 – 54 defeated Finley: 6.9 – 45.
- 1948 – Berrigan: 12.15 – 87 defeated Jerilderie: 12.10 – 82.
- 1949 – Finley: 8.12 – 60 defeated Barooga: 6.12 – 48.
- 1950 – Barooga: 9.7 – 61 drew with Finley: 8.13 – 61.
- 1950 – Barooga: 8.11 – 59 defeated Finley: 6.2 – 38. Grand Final replay.
- 1951 – Jerilderie: 9.8 – 62 defeated Barooga: 8.9 – 57.
- 1952 – Barooga: 8.14 – 62 defeated Yarrawonga: 8.7 – 55.
- 1953 – Barooga: 10.18 – 78 defeated Yarrawonga: 6.7 – 43.
- 1954 – Denilquin: 17.11 – 113 defeated Jerilderie: 4.8 – 32.
- 1955 – Yarrawonga defeated Barooga?, at Tocumwal.
- 1956: Barooga d Deniliquin
- 1957: Yarrawonga d Barooga
- 1958: Berrigan d Cobram

W "Bill" Gibbins Cup – Initially donated in 1959.

- 1959: Numurkah d Nathalia
- 1960: Cobram d Deniliquin
- 1961: Numurkah d Cobram
- 1962: Deniliquin d Numurkah
- 1963: Numurkah d Strathmerton
- 1964: Numurkah d Deniliquin
- 1965: Numurkah d Deniliquin
- 1966: Berrigan d Numurkah
- 1967: Deniliquin d Finley
- 1968: Cobram d Tocumwal
- 1969: Tocumwal d Berrigan
- 1970: Tocumwal d Numurkah
- 1971: Tocumwal d Deniliquin
- 1972: Deniliquin d Numurkah
- 1973: Deniliquin d Cobram
- 1974: Strathmerton d Deniliquin
- 1975: Deniliquin d Strathmerton
- 1976: Cobram d Deniliquin
- 1977: Cobram d Deniliquin
- 1978: Deniliquin d Cobram
- 1979: Deniliquin d Finley
- 1980: Finley d Numurkah
- 1981: Finley d Cobram
- 1982: Finley d Tocumwal
- 1983: Finley d Cobram
- 1984: Cobram d Nathalia
- 1985: Deniliquin d Finley
- 1986: Finley d Deniliquin
- 1987: Mulwala d Deniliquin
- 1988: Cobram d Mulwala
- 1989: Barooga d Mulwala
- 1990: Finley d Mulwala
- 1991: Finley d Deniliquin
- 1992: Cobram d Nathalia
- 1993: Deniliquin d Finley
- 1994: Cobram d Barooga
- 1995: Cobram d Deniliquin
- 1996: Deniliquin
- 1997: Cobram
- 1998: Moama
- 1999: Numurkah
- 2000: Nathalia
- 2001: Deniliquin
- 2002: Mulwala
- 2003: Moama
- 2004: Mulwala
- 2005: Mulwala
- 2006: Barooga
- 2007: Mulwala
- 2008: Barooga
- 2009: Barooga d Moama
- 2010: Mulwala d Moama
- 2011: Moama d Tongala
- 2012: Mulwala d Tongala
- 2013: Mulwala d Tongala
- 2014: Echuca United d Numurkah
- 2015: Moama d Tongala
- 2016: Moama d Barooga
- 2017: Numurkah d Barooga
- 2018: Mulwala d Moama
- 2019: Tongala d Rumbalara
- 2020: MFNL in recess > COVID-19
- 2021: No finals series > COVID-19
- 2022: Tongala d Moama
- 2023: Congupna d Mulwala
- 2024: Mulwala d Deniliquin
- 2025: Moama d Congupna
- 2026: Congupna d Moama

== Thirds Football Premierships ==
Thirds

- 1956: Finley d Berrigan
- 1957: Finley d Berrigan
- 1958: Numurkah d Cobram
- 1959: Cobram d Berrigan
- 1960: Cobram d Strathmerton
- 1961: Numurkah d Cobram
- 1962: Nathalia d Numurkah

Under 16's

- 1963: Deniliquin d Numurkah
- 1964:
- 1965: Nathalia
- 1966: Nathalia
- 1967:
- 1968: Strathmerton
- 1969: Nathalia d Deniliquin
- 1970:

Under 17's

- 2009: Finley d Deniliquin
- 2010: Deniliquin d Cobram
- 2011: Congupna d Echuca United
- 2012: Congupna d Finley
- 2013: Finley d Moama
- 2014: Moama d Mulwala
- 2015: Moama d Cobram
- 2016: Moama d Finley
- 2017: Moama d Cobram
- 2018: Moama d Numurkah
- 2019: Cobram d Rumbalara
- 2020: MFNL in recess > COVID-19
- 2021: No finals series > COVID-19
- 2022: Nathalia d Echuca United
- 2023: Moama d Cobram
- 2024: Cobram d Mulwala
- 2025: Cobram d Moama
- 2026: Deniliquin d Moama

== Murray FNL – Best & Fairest Awards ==
=== Senior Football – O'Dwyer Medal ===
This award is named after long serving MFL President, Mr. M.D. "Des" O'Dwyer (1931 to 1954), who initially donated a gold medal in 1934.

In 1959, Len Sexton, Berrigan tied with the best and fairest winner on votes but finished as runner up under the old countback system.

There are fifteen former senior VFL/AFL footballers below that have won an O'Dwyer Medal.

Multiple medal winners

- 5 – John "JJ" Ryan – Strathmerton
- 4 – George Burke – Numurkah
- 3 – John Fisicaro – Deniliquin
- 2 - George Bush - Berrigan
- 2 – Syd Stewart – Numurkah
- 2 – Terry Wells – Cobram & Jerilderie
- 2 – John Brunner – Barooga
- 2 - Robert Lamberti - Mulwala
- 2 - Lee Warnett - Tocumwal
- 2 – Ryan Bongetti – Cobram
- 2 – Rhys Archard – Moama
- 2 - Jackson Gash - Mulwala

O'Dwyer Medal Winners

- 1931-33: No best & fairest award
- 1934: George Burke, Numurkah (7)
  & Norman Taylor – Finley (7)
- 1935: George Bourke, Numurkah (7)
- 1936: George Bush, Berrigan (3 & 1/2)
- 1937: George Bush – Berrigan (3)
- 1938: George Bourke, Numurkah (10)
- 1939: George Bourke, Numurkah (12)
- 1940: No award. 1940 abandoned after Rd.7,
- 1941-45: MFL in recess due to WW2
- 1946: Merv Dudley, Numurkah (19)
  & Des Martin – Berrigan (19)
- 1947: Bill Lumsden, Katamatite (20)
- 1948: Ron Simpson, Cobram (16)
- 1949: Syd Stewart, Numurkah (?)
- 1950: Syd Stewart, Numurkah (21)
- 1951: Jack Stein, Tocumwal (15)
- 1952: Viv T. Davies, Numurkah (22)
- 1953: Frank Scanlan, Tocumwal (30)
- 1954: Alan Ednie, Berrigan (16)
- 1955: R "Bob" Thompson, Finley (19)
- 1956: Len Carter, Strathmerton (21)
- 1957: John J. Ryan, Strathmerton (21)
- 1958: John J. Ryan, Strathmerton (24)
- 1959: John J. Ryan, Strathmerton (25)
  Len Sexton, Berrigan (25)*
- 1960: Len Sexton, Berrigan (23)
- 1961: Les Mogg, Cobram (17)
- 1962: Graham Ellis, Berrigan (25)
- 1963: John J. Ryan, Strathmerton (20)
- 1964: John J. Ryan, Strathmerton (20)
- 1965: Jim Cullen, Tocumwal (25)
- 1966: Norm Smith, Strathmerton (28)
- 1967: Graham Ion, Deniliquin (29)
- 1968: Fred Way, Berrigan (20)
- 1969: Laurie Flanigan, Cobram (21)
- 1970: Peter Dealy, Numurkah (23)
- 1971: Trevor Miller, Jerilderie (32)
- 1972: Bruce Day, Tocumwal (20)
- 1973: R. Dunn, Strathmerton (25)
- 1974: Terry Wells, Jerilderie (20)
- 1975: Steven Way, Berrigan (12)
- 1976: Peter Pettigrew, Nathalia (15)
- 1977: Michael Hawkins, Finley (16)
- 1978: Steve Maddox, Cobram (25)
- 1979: B. Young, Deniliquin (23)
- 1980: Terry Wells, Cobram (21)
- 1981: G. Ralph, Numurkah (18)
- 1982: Trevor Sutton, Deniliquin (26)
- 1983: Wayne Deledio, Nathalia (28)
- 1984: C. Bell, Strathmerton (20)
- 1985: B. Morrison, Nathalia (26)
- 1986: J. Greiner, Berrigan (20)
- 1987: Philip Beams, Mulwala (25)
- 1988: I. Newell, Strathmerton (29)
- 1989: E. Muench, Jerilderie (27)
- 1990: P. Stevenson, Barooga (30)
- 1991: Brian Bourke, Deniliquin (22)
- 1992: Kelly O’Donnell, Barooga (28)
- 1993: John Brunner, Barooga (27)
- 1994: Chris Foran, Barooga (27)
- 1995: John Fisicaro, Deniliquin (21)
- 1996: John Fisicaro, Deniliquin (20)
- 1997: John Brunner, Barooga (37)
- 1998: Michael Smith, Cobram (26)
  & Shaun Gordon, Congupna (26)
- 1999: Robert Lamberti, Mulwala (26)
- 2000: Brendan Hogan, Moama (24)
- 2001: Robert Lamberti, Mulwala (30)
- 2002: John Fisicaro, Deniliquin (25)
- 2003: G. Spinks, Deniliquin (23)
- 2004: Ashley Gemmill, Nathalia (25)
- 2005: Nathan Gemmill, Nathalia (19)
  & Jason Sanderson, Mulwala (19)
- 2006: Marty Brooks – Barooga (25)
- 2007: Matthew Byers – Barooga (30)
- 2008: Daryl Harrison – Tongala (22)
  & Lee Warnett – Tocumwal (22)
- 2009: Lee Warnett – Tocumwal (21)
- 2010: Ryan Bongetti – Cobram (20)
- 2011: Ryan Bongetti – Cobram (27)
- 2012: Rowan Priest, Echuca United (29)
- 2013: Ashley Morris – Deniliquin (28)
- 2014: Marcus Smith – Barooga (26)
- 2015: Rhys Archard – Moama (29)
- 2016: Ned Morrison – Finley (25)
- 2017: Rhys Archard – Moama (25)
- 2018: Brodie A’vard – Barooga (37)
- 2019: Jackson Gash – Mulwala (30)
- 2020: MFNL in recess > COVID-19
- 2021: Coby McCarthy – Tongala (19)
- 2022: Nicholas Jamieson – Tongala &
- 2022: Brodie Ross – Naithalia (25)
- 2023: Jackson Gash – Mulwala (23)
- 2024: Sam Beasley – Cobram &
- 2024: Jack Russell – Moama (22)
- 2025: Jackson Trengove – Cobram (27)
- 2026:

=== Reserves Football ===
Murray Seconds Eighteen FA

- 1946-50: No B&F award?
- 1951: Max Mason – Jerilderie &
  M Toohey – Barooga (25)
- 1952: Vin Toohey - Barooga (?)
- 1953 - Vin Toohey - Barooga (?)
- 1954: Gerald O'Dwyer - Barooga
- 1955: G O'Dwyer - Barooga
- 1956: Don Hyde - Deniliquin
- 1957: Jim Cullen – Barooga (24)
- 1958: Vin Toohey - Barooga (24)

MFL President's Trophy – 1959 to 2002

- 1959: B Fanner – Nathalia (14)
- 1960: A Vearing – Nathalia (12)
- 1961: Ian "Joey" Bush – Berrigan (20)
- 1962: J Jennings – Deniliquin (23)
- 1963: R Crowley – Finley (22)
- 1964: J Turvey – Strathmerton (20)
- 1965: F Simpson – Finley (15)
- 1966: B Ryan – Nathalia (26)
- 1967: R Randell – Tocumwal (20)
- 1968: R Randell – Tocumwal (12)
- 1969: D Watt – Tocumwal (20)
- 1970: B Morrison – Nathalia (22)
- 1971: J Herberte – Tocumwal (14)
- 1972: T Maher – Deniliquin (17)
- 1973: T Maher – Deniliquin (19)
- 1974: P Smith – Jerilderie (24)
- 1975: R Kelly – Tocumwal &
  A Willoughby – Deniliquin (11)
- 1976: D Darby – Cobram (16)
- 1977: B Herberte – Tocumwal (15)
  P Webb – Strathmerton (15)*
- 1978: P Todd – Deniliquin (14)
- 1979: Gary Mills – Deniliquin (12)
- 1980: J Greiner – Berrigan (19)
- 1981: K Thewlis – Cobram (20)
- 1982: G Burness – Numurkah (14)
- 1983: L Evans – Cobram (17)
- 1984: T Saunders – Nathalia (16)
- 1985: K Bevan – Tocumwal (13)
- 1986: J Artavilla – Cobram &
  S Catena – Jerilderie (11)
- 1987: M Anderson – Findlay (15)
- 1988: G Giggins – Mulwala (24)
- 1989: S Lawford – Mulwala (18)
- 1990: J Sibraa – Berrigan (16)
- 1991: N Gemmill – Nathalia (17)
- 1992: L Hicks – Nathalia (14)
- 1993: D Newell – Strathmerton (16)
- 1994: J Wellman – Numurkah (15)
- 1995: S Mark – Nathalia (20)
- 1996: M Limbrick – Nathalia (21)
- 1997: D Mollison – Mulwala (21)
- 1998: R Hansford – Nathalia (19)
- 1999: A Hawks – Nathalia (17)
- 2000: A Favaro – Nathalia (21)
- 2001: Daryl Cooper – Mulwala (19)
- 2002: Alan Favaro – Nathalia (27)

Damien Jones Medal – 2003 to present day

- 2003: Ty Russell – Finley (21)
- 2004: Leigh Miller – Mulwala (18)
- 2005: Peter Beasley – Cobram (26)
- 2006: Daryl Bowden – Barooga &
  Daniel Kirchen – Mulwala (25)
- 2007: Robert Baldock – Echuca United &
  Stephen Nunn – Mulwala &
  Stephen Reynolds – Finley (16)
- 2008: Wayne Giblin – Cobram (18)
- 2009: Tim Easton – Moama (17)
- 2010: Tim Easton – Moama (21)
- 2011: Paul Nevill – Moama (19)
- 2012: Ashley Hughes – Tongala (28)
- 2013: Chris O'Neill – Mulwala (24)
- 2014: Keegan Ryan – Numurkah (21)
- 2015: Paul Nevill – Moama (26)
- 2016: James Tyler – Tongala (15)
- 2017: Chris O'Neill – Mulwala (22)
- 2018: Chris O'Neill – Mulwala &
  James Tyler – Tongala (18)
- 2019: Alan Richardson – Tungamah (28)
- 2020: MFNL in recess > COVID-19
- 2021: Nicholas Woods – Tongala (29)
- 2022: Joesepth Bland – Mulwala &
  Aiden Free – Deniliquin (19)
- 2023: Fraser Buchanan – Moama (16)
- 2024: Jake Myles – Congupna (24)
- 2025: Daniel Ellis – Cobram (28)
- 2026:
- – 1977: P Webb (Strathmerton) tied with the winner on votes but finished as runner up under the old countback system.

== Goalkicking Award ==
The initial Murray FL goalkicking award was presented in 1947 and was donated was the Murray FL secretary, Mr Les Belt. The award for the leading goalkicker in the Murray FNL senior football receives the Les Mogg Perpetual Trophy. Mogg was the first footballer to kick 100 goals in the home and away season when he kicked 132 goals in 1960, playing for Cobram. Finley's Darren Jackson kicked 100 plus goals in five separate football seasons.

Most goals in a season

- 249^ - Trevor Sutton: Deniliquin, 1982
- 150^ - Darren Jackson: Finley, 1983
- 148^ - Les Mogg: Cobram, 1960
- 146^ - Jamie Solyom: Mulwala, 2001
- 142^ - Bill Brownless: Jerilderie, 1985

(^ - includes goals kicked in finals)

Most goals in match

- 24 - Trevor Sutton: Deniliquin v Coleambally, Rd.5, 1982
- 21 - Graham Bland: Berrigan

Senior Football

	Murray FNL: Senior Football Leading & Century Goalkickers				
Year	Winner	Club	Season Goals	Goals in finals	Total Goals
1931-46	No stats kept?				
Murray FNL: Les Belt Trophy
1947	Les Koopman	Cobram	94	7	101
1948	Des Martin	Berrigan	42		
1949	Les Koopman	Cobram	62		
1950	Denis Bourke	Nathalia	70		
Murray FNL: W. "Bill" Limbrick Trophy
1951	G Smith	Tocumwal	57	4	61
1952	Jack Garth	Berrigan	49		
1953	A "Keith" Reid	Deniliquin	60		
1954	Les Koopman	Cobram	70		
1955	Joe Hickey	Berrigan	63	7	70
1956	E Tucker	Cobram	56		
1957	A "Lochie" Cameron	Deniliquin	81		
1958	A "Lochie" Cameron	Deniliquin	63		
1959	W "Bill" Jones	Cobram	80		
1960	Les Mogg	Cobram	132	16	148
1961	Les Mogg	Cobram	85	7	92
Murray FNL: Les Mogg Perpetual Trophy
1962	M McKay	Nathalia	64		
1963	W Mercer	Deniliquin	68		
1964	Graham Frew	Strathmerton	82		
1965	Daryl Twitt	Numurkah	82		
1966	Daryl Twitt	Numurkah	93	3	96
1967	Daryl Twitt	Numurkah	71		
1968	Daryl Twitt	Numurkah	62		
1969	Graham Miller	Jerildere	69		
1970	Neil Davis	Berrigan	60		
1971	Greg Collins	Deniliquin	81	20	101
1972	Greg Collins	Deniliquin	88		
1973	Greg Collins	Deniliquin	89		
1974	Gary Fraser	Cobram	84		
1975	Gavin Carter	Strathmerton	74		
1976	Greg Danckert	Deniliquin	57		
1977	Don Rudd	Numurkah	55		
1978	Graham Bland	Berrigan	96		
1979	Graham Bland	Berrigan	110		
1980	1st: Graham Bland	Berrigan	120		
	2nd: Peter Cowan	Numurkah	108		
1981	Trevor Sutton	Deniliquin	105		
1982	Trevor Sutton	Deniliquin	227	22	249
1983	Darren Jackson	Finley	145	5	150
1984	James Weeding	Cobram	108		
1985	Bill Brownless	Jerilderie	136	6	142
1986	Darren Jackson	Finley	117	19	136
1987	1st: Mick Souter	Nathalia	125	8	133
	2nd: Ray Power	Berrigan	120		
	Mark Spence	Jerilderie	100+		
1988	Mick Souter	Nathalia	117		
1989	1st: Darren Jackson	Finley	110		
	2nd: Gavin Bayes	Barooga	101		
1990	1st: Peter Boyd	Mulwala	116	10	126
	2nd: Paul McCarty	Barooga	108		
1991	1st: Gavin Bayes	Barooga	128	15	143
	2nd: Darren Jackson	Finley	126		
1992	1st: Darren Brookes	Tocumwal	127	4	131
	2nd: Scott Kempster	Berrigan	126		
	3rd: Gavin Johnstone	Barooga	123		
	3rd: Paul O'Bree	Deniliquin	123		
1993	1st: Anthony Smith	Tocumwal	113		
	2nd: Danny Irwin	Strathmerton	110		
1994	Perry Meka	Numurkah	102	7	109
1995	Perry Meka	Numurkah	95	8	103
1996	Sean Drennan	Deniliquin	66		
1997	Darren Jackson	Finley	107		
1998	Leo Tenace	Echuca United	105	5	110
1999	Guy Madigan	Congupna	92		
2000	Adam Rudd	Nathalia	78		
2001	1st: Jamie Solyom	Mulwala	140	6	146
	2nd: Steve Ryan	Barooga	127		
2002	Jamie Solyom	Mulwala	75		
2003	Aaron Thorpe	Deniliquin	65		
2004	Brendan Parker	Nathalia	92	16	108
2005	Brendan Parker	Nathalia	120	11	131
2006	Brendan Parker	Nathalia	108	13	121
2007	Brendan Parker	Nathalia	106	5	111
2008	Cameron McCabe	Moama	117		
2009	Michael Allen	Moama	89	18	107
2010	Sam Lloyd	Deniliquin	105	2	107
2011	Rob Osborne	Cobram	88	12	100
2012	Jason Limbrick	Nathalia	76	8	84
2013	Chase Strawhorn	Mulwala	78	3	81
2014	Tyler Jones	Moama	90	N/A	90
2015	Paul Newman	Tongala	100	13	113
2016	Tyler Jones	Moama	73	N/A	73
2017	Ashley Froud	Mulwala	112	1	113
2018	Brodie Ross	Nathalia	59	10	69
2019	Josh Mellington	Echuca United	125	5	130
2020	MFNL in recess >	COVID-19			
2021	Daniel Campbell	Congupna	43	N/A	43
2022	Daniel Campbell	Congupna	61	1	62
2023	James Hartney	Echuca United	102		102
2024	Kyle Meuller	Congupna	95	6	101
2025	Kyle Meuller	Congupna	88	6	94
2026					
Year	Winner	Club	Season Goals	Goals in finals	Total Goals

== 2014 Ladder ==
Murray FL	Wins	Byes	Losses	Draws	For	Against	%	Pts	Final	Team	G	B	Pts	Team	G	B	Pts
Rumbalara	14	0	3	1	2009	1401	143.40%	58	Elimination	Barooga	18	11	119	Mulwala	12	6	78
Finley	14	0	4	0	1610	1134	141.98%	56	Qualifying	Echuca United	13	11	89	Deniliquin	7	11	53
Echuca United	12	0	6	0	1508	1062	142.00%	48	1st Semi	Echuca United	15	7	97	Barooga	10	13	73
Barooga	12	0	6	0	1767	1248	141.59%	48	2nd Semi	Rumbalara	16	19	115	Finley	12	10	82
Mulwala	12	0	6	0	1810	1398	129.47%	48	Preliminary	Finley	23	7	145	Echuca United	8	6	54
Deniliquin	12	0	6	0	1467	1177	124.64%	48	Grand	Rumbalara	11	11	77	Finley	10	12	72
Nathalia	11	0	6	1	1539	1014	151.78%	46									
Moama	9	0	9	0	1674	1479	113.18%	36									
Congupna	4	0	14	0	1241	1458	85.12%	16									
Numurkah	4	0	14	0	1184	1776	66.67%	16									
Tongala	3	0	15	0	1353	1806	74.92%	12									
Cobram	0	0	18	0	595	2804	21.22%	0									

== 2015 Ladder ==
Murray FL	Wins	Byes	Losses	Draws	For	Against	%	Pts	Final	Team	G	B	Pts	Team	G	B	Pts
Mulwala	14	0	4	0	1637	1276	128.29%	56	Elimination	Moama	18	5	113	Rumbalara	12	8	80
Nathalia	13	0	5	0	1819	956	190.27%	52	Qualifying	Tongala	17	11	113	Barooga	8	7	55
Rumbalara	13	0	5	0	1856	1446	128.35%	52	1st Semi	Moama	13	11	89	Tongala	13	6	84
Barooga	13	0	5	0	1607	1298	123.81%	52	2nd Semi	Nathalia	17	5	107	Mulwala	13	9	87
Tongala	12	0	6	0	1965	1394	140.96%	48	Preliminary	Moama	19	8	122	Mulwala	11	8	74
Moama	12	0	6	0	1655	1211	136.66%	48	Grand	Nathalia	13	9	87	Moama	12	12	84
Echuca United	11	0	7	0	1474	1415	104.17%	44									
Finley	7	0	11	0	1302	1354	96.16%	28									
Numurkah	6	0	12	0	1304	1412	92.35%	24									
Deniliquin	4	0	14	0	1215	1796	67.65%	16									
Congupna	2	0	16	0	1009	1920	52.55%	8									
Cobram	1	0	17	0	729	2094	34.81%	4									

== 2016 Ladder ==
Murray FL	Wins	Byes	Losses	Draws	For	Against	%	Pts	Final	Team	G	B	Pts	Team	G	B	Pts
Finley	16	0	2	0	1809	818	221.15%	64	Elimination	Barooga	15	21	111	Rumbalara	5	4	34
Nathalia	15	0	3	0	2031	965	210.47%	60	Qualifying	Moama	17	9	111	Numurkah	15	8	98
Barooga	15	0	3	0	2046	980	208.78%	60	1st Semi	Moama	14	9	93	Barooga	13	8	86
Moama	14	0	4	0	2125	919	231.23%	56	2nd Semi	Nathalia	11	10	76	Finley	9	12	66
Numurkah	11	0	7	0	1802	1188	151.68%	44	Preliminary	Finley	16	12	108	Moama	8	6	54
Rumbalara	11	0	7	0	1806	1352	133.58%	44	Grand	Nathalia	11	11	77	Finley	11	8	74
Mulwala	8	0	10	0	1496	1508	99.20%	32									
Cobram	6	0	12	0	1148	1620	70.86%	24									
Tongala	5	0	13	0	1291	1557	82.92%	20									
Deniliquin	4	0	14	0	946	1837	51.50%	16									
Echuca United	3	0	15	0	972	2071	46.93%	12									
Congupna	0	0	18	0	275	2932	9.38%	0									

== 2017 Ladder ==
Murray FL	Wins	Byes	Losses	Draws	For	Against	%	Pts	Final	Team	G	B	Pts	Team	G	B	Pts
Numurkah	16	0	2	0	2488	819	303.79%	64	Elimination	Barooga	18	18	126	Echuca United	4	4	28
Nathalia	15	0	3	0	2277	939	242.49%	60	Qualifying	Moama	15	10	100	Mulwala	6	10	46
Barooga	14	0	4	0	2078	1017	204.33%	56	1st Semi	Barooga	17	12	114	Moama	10	6	66
Mulwala	13	0	5	0	1844	1234	149.43%	52	2nd Semi	Numurkah	13	11	89	Nathalia	10	3	63
Moama	13	0	5	0	1701	1188	143.18%	52	Preliminary	Nathalia	12	6	78	Barooga	5	7	37
Echuca United	12	0	6	0	1589	1202	132.20%	48	Grand	Nathalia	10	7	67	Numurkah	7	15	57
Cobram	8	0	10	0	1422	1487	95.63%	32									
Deniliquin	7	0	11	0	1098	1648	66.63%	28									
Rumbalara	3	0	15	0	1167	2030	57.49%	12									
Tongala	3	0	15	0	1107	1931	57.33%	12									
Congupna	3	0	15	0	1053	2182	48.26%	12									
Finley	1	0	17	0	672	2819	23.84%	4									

== 2018 to 2022 Ladders ==
- All Murray FL ladders can be viewed via this link.

== 2023 Ladder ==
Murray FL	Wins	Losses	Draws	Byes	For	Against	%	Pts	Final	Team	G	B	Pts	Team	G	B	Pts
Mulwala	17	1	0	2	2148	759	287.75%	68	Elimination Final 1	Numurkah	12	5	77	Finley	13	9	87
Congupna	13	5	0	2	1959	956	204.92%	52	Elimination Final 2	Nathalia	11	7	73	Moama	12	6	78
Numurkah	13	5	0	2	1582	1033	153.15%	52	Second Semi Final	Mulwala	11	8	74	Congupna	17	9	111
Nathalia	13	5	0	2	1710	1118	152.95%	52	First Semi Final	Finley	8	6	54	Moama	11	9	75
Moama	12	6	0	2	1492	854	174.71%	48	Preliminary Final	Mulwala	8	9	57	Moama	7	8	50
Finley	12	6	0	2	1525	1131	134.84%	48	Grand Final	Congupna	9	11	65	Mulwala	14	14	98
Cobram	10	8	0	2	1342	1138	117.93%	40									
Barooga	8	10	0	2	1360	1427	95.30%	32									
Deniliquin	7	11	0	2	1203	1137	105.80%	28									
Echuca United	6	12	0	2	1483	1404	105.63%	24									
Tongala	5	13	0	2	1309	1386	94.44%	20									
Tocumwal	1	17	0	2	726	2561	28.35%	4									
Rumbalara	0	18	0	2	419	3390	12.36%	0									

== 2024 Ladder ==
Murray FL	Wins	Losses	Draws	Byes	For	Against	%	Pts	Final	Team	G	B	Pts	Team	G	B	Pts
Congupna	17	1	0	0	1782	919	193.91%	68	Elimination Final 1	Moama	13	14	92	Numurkah	8	10	58
Finley	13	4	1	0	1397	1014	137.77%	54	Elimination Final 2	Deniliquin	14	9	93	Mulwala	11	11	77
Moama	12	5	1	0	1365	940	145.21%	50	Second Semi Final	Congupna	16	9	105	Finley	11	10	76
Deniliquin	12	6	0	0	1290	893	144.46%	48	First Semi Final	Moama	10	8	68	Deniliquin	8	6	54
Mulwala	11	7	0	0	1408	988	142.51%	44	Preliminary Final	Finley	7	7	49	Moama	7	5	47
Numurkah	10	7	1	0	1423	1151	123.63%	42	Grand Final	Congupna	9	11	65	Finley	9	10	64
Cobram	10	8	0	0	1289	987	130.50%	40									
Nathalia	9	8	1	0	1461	1208	120.94%	38									
Tongala	6	12	0	0	1011	1466	68.96%	24									
Rumbalara	3	15	0	0	1044	1703	61.30%	12									
Barooga	2	16	0	0	979	1713	57.15%	8									
Echuca United	1	17	0	0	579	2045	28.31%	4									

== 2025 Ladder ==
Murray FL	Wins	Losses	Draws	Byes	For	Against	%	Pts	Final	Team	G	B	Pts	Team	G	B	Pts
Congupna	18	0	0	0	2626	629	417.49%	72	Elimination Final 1	Moama	8	9	57	Numurkah	7	5	47
Mulwala	14	4	0	0	1699	990	171.62%	56	Elimination Final 2	Cobram	12	10	82	Nathalia	10	9	69
Moama	14	4	0	0	1436	991	144.90%	56	Second Semi Final	Congupna	15	16	106	Mulwala	6	9	45
Cobram	12	6	0	0	1561	964	161.93%	48	First Semi Final	Moama	10	8	68	Cobram	11	13	79
Nathalia	12	6	0	0	1287	1213	106.10%	48	Preliminary Final	Mulwala	9	8	62	Cobram	10	13	73
Numurkah	10	8	0	0	1360	1073	126.75%	40	Grand Final	Congupna	5	21	51	Cobram	8	6	54
Rumbalara	8	10	0	0	1178	1462	80.57%	32									
Echuca United	6	12	0	0	1096	1431	76.59%	24									
Deniliquin	6	12	0	0	996	1355	73.51%	24									
Tongala	5	13	0	0	1163	1622	71.70%	20									
Finley	3	15	0	0	811	1863	43.53%	12									
Barooga	0	18	0	0	534	2154	24.79%	0									

== 2026 Ladder ==
Murray FL	Wins	Losses	Draws	Byes	For	Against	%	Pts	Final	Team	G	B	Pts	Team	G	B	Pts
Congupna	16	1	1	2	1888	910	207.47%	66	Elimination Final 1	Mulwala	7	19	61	Tongala	9	13	67
Cobram	13	5	0	2	1830	1046	174.95%	52	Elimination Final 2	Nathalia	10	11	71	Numurkah	8	10	58
Mulwala	13	5	0	2	1589	1086	146.32%	52	Second Semi Final	Congupna	9	9	63	Cobram	9	6	60
Nathalia	12	6	0	2	1453	1079	134.66%	48	First Semi Final	Tongala	7	6	48	Nathalia	15	12	102
Numurkah	10	8	0	2	1337	1111	120.34%	40	Preliminary Final	Cobram	14	11	95	Nathalia	10	12	72
Tongala	10	8	0	2	1350	1287	104.90%	40	Grand Final	Congupna	14	6	90	Cobram	11	16	82
Moama	8	10	0	2	1012	1448	69.89%	32									
Finley	7	11	0	2	1419	1127	125.91%	28									
Echuca United	4	13	1	2	921	1388	66.35%	18									
Deniliquin	3	15	0	2	823	1725	47.71%	12									
Rumbalara	2	16	0	2	860	2275	37.80%	8									
