= Huggard =

Huggard is a surname. Notable people with the surname include:

- David Huggard (born 1990), better known as Eureka O'Hara, American drag queen
- Frank Huggard (1894–1965), Australian rules footballer
- Jack Huggard (1901–1972), Australian rules footballer
- Jackie Huggard (1926–2016), Australian rules footballer
- Walter Huggard, British barrister
