= Cobram Football Club =

Cobram

Names
- Full name: Cobram Football Netball Club
- Nickname: Tigers

2023 season
- Home-and-away season: 7th (10-8)
- Leading goalkicker: Mitchell Ward (38)
- Best and fairest: Sam Beasley

Club details
- Founded: 1887; 139 years ago
- Colours
- Competition: Murray FNL
- President: Michael Hoban
- Coach: John Brunkskill
- Captain: Sam Beasley
- Ground: Scott Oval

Uniforms
Home	Clash

The Cobram Football Club, nicknamed the Tigers, is an Australian rules football and netball club based in the regional city of Cobram located in north east Victoria. Cobram teams currently compete in the Murray FNL.

== History ==
Formed in 1887, Cobram began in the Goulburn Valley Football Association (GVFA) in 1888. The club also had short stints in the Murray Border Football Association and Federal District Football Association.

Cobram FC also won two additional premierships in 1892 and 1893 as per a letter to the Cobram Courier by former player, Jack McNamara in 1903, who wrote that he had possession of the actual "Gedye's Victoria Hotel Cup" premiership cups.

In 1911, the GVFA's southernmost clubs voted against the entry of Cobram due to what was deemed as excessive travel. Cobram then went into recess in 1911, before returning to the GVFA in 1912.

Cobram was a founding member of the Murray Football League in 1931 and has remained in this league ever since.

In 1936 Cobram and Barooga football clubs merged and played as the Cobram Barooga United FC for a single season before the club was officially disbanded in April 1937. The two clubs then reformed as independent bodies, with Cobram re-joining the Murray FL and Barooga joining the Southern Riverina Football League in 1937.

Cobram Tigers remains as one of the stronger teams in MFL with multiple premierships in Senior and Junior years over the years.

Cadeyn Williams was rookie drafted to Richmond Football Club in the 2013 AFL Rookie Draft. Cadeyn played all his juniors at Cobram, Esava Ratugolea got drafted to the Geelong Football Club in the 2017 draft at pick 43, after playing thirds and seniors at Cobram.

After a positive home and away season for Cobram, the Murray Football League called time on the 2021 season in the wake of the COVID-19 pandemic, leaving a young tigers outfit hungrier than ever to bring home their first senior flag since 1998.

The 2022 season brought much promise, starting off the season with a dominant 98 point win over the Finley Football Club. The Tigers went on to win 12 straight games before being defeated in a 1 point thriller against the Nathalia Football Club. Finishing 15-3 for the home and away season, Cobram were the Minor Premiers for the 2022 season of the Murray Football League. Cobram would beat 2nd placed Mulwala by 2 goals in the first semi-final, advancing straight to the grand final. The grand final would start well for the Tigers, going into half time with the scores 4.3-27 v 1.3-9 against the Mulwala Football Club. Cobram however would eventually fall to Mulwala in a wet and muddy game that was fought until the very end.

Cobram would find success in the 2022 season however, with the fourths taking the ultimate glory (Cobram 3.4-22 def Moama 3.1-19).

== Football Leagues Timeline ==
Goulburn Valley Football Association

- 1888 to 1891

Gedye's Victoria Hotel Trophy

- 1892 to 1893

Murray Border Football Association

- 1894 to 1896

Federal District Football Association

- 1897 to 1902

Cobram Football Club

- 1903 – Club in recess

Goulburn Valley Football Association

- 1904 to 1910

Cobram Football Club

- 1911 – Club in recess. Refused entry into the GVFA.

Goulburn Valley Football Association

- 1912 to 1914

Cobram Football Club

- 1915 to 1918 – Club in recess. World War II

Goulburn Valley Football Association

- 1919 to 1930

Murray Football League

- 1931 to present

== Football Premierships ==
Seniors

- Gedye's Victoria Hotel Trophy (2)
  - 1892, 1893
- Federal District Football Association (1)
  - 1902
- Goulburn Valley Football Association (6)
  - 1907 1909, 1913 1914, 1928, 1929
- Murray Football League (13)
  - 1931, 1947#, 1948, 1955, 1959, 1960, 1961#, 1969, 1974, 1984#, 1995, 1998, 2025

Reserves

- Murray Valley Second Eighteen Football Association
  - 1935, 1936- Cobram / Barooga United FC
- Murray Football League (9)
  - 1960, 1968, 1976, 1977, 1984, 1988, 1992#, 1994, 1995

Thirds

- Murray Football League (10)
  - 1960, 1971, 1975, 1977, 1979, 1985, 1987, 1990, 1991, 1996, 2019,

Fourths

- Murray Football League (11)
  - 1978, 1979, 1982, 1983, 1984, 1985, 1986, 1987, 1988, 1995, 2008#, 2015#, 2016#, 2018#, 2022.

# - hash means undefeated champions

== VFL / AFL Players ==
The following Cobram footballers have played senior VFL / AFL football or have been drafted to an AFL club. The year below indicates their debut season in VFL / AFL.

Victorian Football League

- 1905 – Dave McNamara – St. Kilda
- 1920 – Charlie Tuck – Richmond
- 1925 – Jack Huggard – Richmond
- 1926 – Stuart Russell – Essendon & Hawthorn
- 1933 – Harold Dickinson – Essendon
- 1945 – Jackie Huggard – Essendon & North Melbourne
- 1949 – Ron Simpson – Fitzroy
- 1961 – Keith Hollands – North Melbourne
- 1965 – Peter Ennals – Footscray
- 1974 – Jeff Cassidy – Geelong
- 1979 – Greg Nichols – Geelong
- 1984 – Steve Hocking – Geelong
- 1987 – John Barnes – Essendon & Geelong
- 1987 – Garry Hocking – Geelong

Australian Football League

- 1994 – Shane Sikora – West Coast Eagles
- 1999 – Robert Forster-Knight – Essendon & Port Adelaide
- 2013 – Cadeyn Williams – Richmond. 2012 AFL draft Rookie
- 2017 – Esava Ratugolea – Geelong
