= Corowa Football Club =

Australian rules football club

Corowa

Names
- Full name: Corowa Football Club
- Nickname: Spiders

Club details
- Founded: 1877
- Dissolved: 1979; 47 years ago (merged to form the Corowa-Rutherglen FC)
- Colours
- Competition: Ovens & Murray Football League
- Premierships: (2): 1932, 1968
- Ground: John Foord Oval, Corowa, NSW.

Uniforms
Home

The Corowa Football Club, nicknamed the Spiders, was an Australian rules football club based in Corowa, New South Wales, that competed in the Ovens & Murray Football League.

The club merged with the Wahgunyah Football Club on several occasions during its early history and as a result was also known as the Border United Football Club from time to time between 1877 and 1947.

Then in 1979, both Corowa Football Club and Rutherglen Football Club merged to form Corowa Rutherglen Football Club and have played in the Ovens and Murray Football League ever since.

== Club history ==
The Corowa Football club was established by a gentleman called Jacob Levin in 1877. Wahgunyah Football Club soon followed and the first recorded match of the Corowa Football Club was a return match against Wahgunyah Football Club on Saturday, 16 June 1877, played "on the hill" in Corowa, with Wahgunyah winning the first encounter.

As early as 1877, there was talk of the Wahgunyah and Corowa Football merging to form one stronger club and be called Border United Football Club. This merger actually took place and their first match as Border United was played against the Rutherglen Football Club in August 1877 and was captained by Jacob Levin. The Border United team wore pink and white colours.

In 1879, a North East Victorian district football team was compiled to play the Melbourne Football Club in Melbourne on 25 September 1879. Border United players selected in this squad were J Chivell, J Levin and A McLaughlin, resulting in a win to Melbourne.

In 1880, in a match played on the Corowa ground to decide the "unofficial" premiership of the North East District, Border United: 7.14 – 56 defeated Beechworth: 2.1 – 13. Jacob Levin captained the Border side.

In 1884, 20 acres of land along the Murray River near the main bridge across from Wahgunyah was set aside by the NSW Department of Lands as a recreational reserve in Corowa. Regulations were written up in 1911 with the reserve under the management of a group of locally elected trustees.

In 1884, the Corowa Junior footballers travelled to Albury, but were defeated in a close match.

In July 1887, Border United FC hosted the Essendon Football Club in Corowa, with about 1000 people present, with Essendon, 4.14 – 38 defeating Corowa 3.5 – 23. James Nugent was captain of the Border United FC side.

Border United FC was a very settled club between 1877 and 1905, with annual general meetings and club office bearers reported in the Corowa Free Press newspaper every year. They played many friendly matches against other local towns and teams, prior to entering the O&MFA in 1895.

In 1890, Border United FC had a first 20 side and a second 20 side that played in a number of friendly matches against other local teams.

The Border United Football Club first entered the Ovens and Murray Football League in 1895 and finished third on the ladder. Border United FC remained in the O&MFA between 1895 and 1905.

In 1896, William King – Border United FC was arrested and charged with assaulting umpire Tidyman, cutting his face in a match against Chiltern Football Club. King was fined £3, plus £8 in legal fees in the Corowa Police Court, in default of six months imprisonment. The fine was paid for by several local residents. The Ovens and Murray Football League later disqualified King for life.

In 1897, the Border United and Corowa Federal Junior Football Club's merged after a number of last year's players had left the district.

In 1899, the small town of Corowa boasted four football teams – Border United, Half – Holidays, Pilots and Pirates, as well as Wahgungah across the river.

In 1900 Border United played off for the O&MFA premiership against Excelsior in Rutherglen after both finishing the season on equal points, but lost the match by 10 points, thus finishing as runners up.

In 1902, 1903 and 1904, Border United finished second on the O&MFA ladder at the end of the home and away season. No finals were played in these seasons. In 1905, Border United failed to win a game in the O&MFA. So in early 1906 the Border United FC changed its name to the Corowa Football Club after much discussion at the club's AGM.

At the Border United FC's Annual General Meeting at the O'Leary's Courthouse Hotel on Wednesday, 13 April 1904 and "owing to the apathy shown last year and so far as the present season has gone it was decided to disband the club."

Then on Tuesday, 19 April 1904, a meeting was held at Kelly's Corowa Hotel, it was resolved to re-form and once again enter the O&MFA, with the nominations and elections of the club's office bearers taking place.

In 1904, the Trustees of the Corowa Recreation Reserve co-signed the "Regulations for the management of the recreation ground at Corowa".

At an Ovens and Murray Football Association meeting in Rutherglen on Wednesday, 5 July 1905, the President stated that "the Border United side had disbanded for the remainder of the season", resulting in a winless season.

In 1906 the Corowa and District Football Association was formed and the following teams entered this competition – Balldale, Burryjaa, Corowa, Howlong and Wahgunyah. Corowa Football Club went onto win the premiership, finishing on top of the ladder, with seven wins from eight games.

In 1906, Corowa FC captain, Fred Nixon left Corowa for financial reasons to go and play with the Rutherglen FC.

In 1907, Corowa finishing fourth on the ladder in the Corowa and District Football Association, which was won by the Wahgunyah Football Club.

At the Annual General Meeting of the Border United Football Club in Corowa on Tuesday, 20 May 1908 at the Corowa Hotel, it was decided to change the club's name to the Corowa Football Club after the Wahgunyah Football Club informed them that wanted to run a team by themselves. Both clubs played in the Ovens and Murray Football League in 1908.

In 1909, Corowa once again played in the O&MFL, but in 1910 Corowa FC went into recess as a club. One newspaper article wrote due to "the introduction of professionalism in different teams......it absolutely killed football in Corowa......a number of players now appear to play for whichever club is offering the highest price". Wahgunyah FC played in the O&MFL Junior competition in 1910 and were runners up to Lake Moodermere.

In 1911, the Corowa FC were reformed after a meeting at Jager's Royal Hotel on Tuesday, 4 April and decided to continue to play in the red and black colours as in previous years. They then entered the Rutherglen and District Football Association and played as Corowa FC in 1911 and 1912.

In September 1911, Chas Flowers won a gold medal for winning the Corowa Free Press goalkicking competition.

In 1913, the club changed its name to and was referred to as the Border United Football Club in the local newspaper, The Corowa Free Press. The club lost the Preliminary Final to Rutherglen by five points.

In the 1914 O&MFA Grand Final Rutherglen: 9.9 – 63 defeated Border United: 6.16 – 52 on the Albury Sportsground.

In September 1914, North Melbourne Football Club defeated Border United on the Corowa Recreation Reserve.

In 1918, Border United FC played in the Rutherglen & Murray Football Association consisting of the following sides: Border United, Freehold Ramblers and Lake Rovers, with all funds raised going to the Patriotic Fund. Lake Rovers defeated the Freehold Ramblers in the grand final at Barkly Park Oval, Rutherglen.

In 1919, Border United returned to the O&MFA and wore a red guernsey with black hoops.

When the O&MFA went into recess in 1920, Corowa FC entered the Coreen & District Football Association and competed with – Balldale, Burraja, Coreen, Daysdale and Oakslands. Corowa took out the 1920 premiership, defeating Daysdale in the grand final played at Burraja.

In 1921 Corowa FC returned to the O&MFA and were defeated by St. Patrick's FC in the grand final played at the Albury Showgrounds.

In 1924, Corowa FC appointed former St. Kilda Football Club player, Rex De Garis as playing coach and wore a red jumper with two black vertical stripes on the front of the jumper.

In 1926, Frank Huggard was initially appointed, but Maurie Sheahan ended up as the official coach in 1926.

In March 1926, the Corowa Stars Football Club was established to foster young football talent in the town and provide coaching to a team of juniors, who from time to time could fill in for Corowa's O&MFA club. The Corowa Stars initially applied to enter the Coreen & District Football League, but their entry was rejected. Corowa Stars were later accepted into the Chiltern & District Football Association in 1926. The Corowa Stars went onto win the 1927 Chiltern & DFL premiership when they defeated Wodonga Rovers on the Chiltern Football Ground and were captained by Jack Kuschert. Corowa Stars played in the Corowa & District FA from 1930 to 1933. Corowa Stars decided to reform after their 1934 – AGM, but it appears they never got up and going and did not enter a team in any local competition and ultimately folded.

In 1926, the Corowa Recreation Reserve hosted the O&MFA grand final when St. Patrick's FC defeated Wangaratta Football Club.

In an interesting move at the conclusion of the 1926 O&MFL season for Corowa FC, coach Maurie Sheahan accepted the coaching job at Walbundrie Football Club for the remainder of the 1926 season.

In 1929, the O&MFA selected Corowa as the venue to host the grand final, when East Albury defeated West Albury.

One of the local Corowa FC stars of the 1920s was forward, Newman Bufford who apparently was "the greatest forward the Murray ever knew. The man Maurie Hunter takes his hat off to."

In 1930, Corowa appointed former St. Kilda Football Club player, Bert Smedley as playing coach.

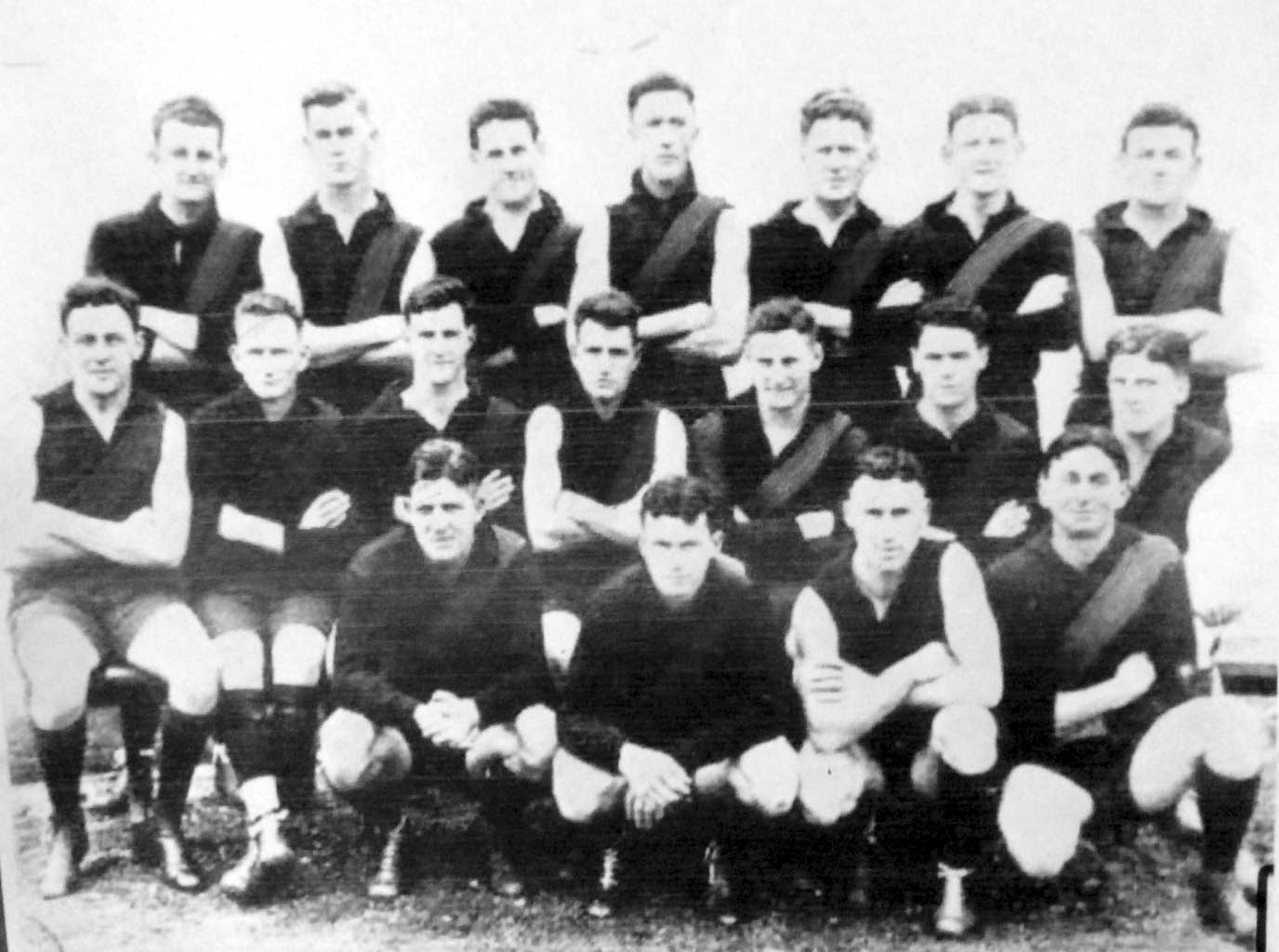
1932 Corowa FC team that played against East Albury in semi final

In 1932, Corowa, captained by Ray "Nana" Baker defeated West Albury Football Club in the Ovens and Murray Football League grand final on the Albury Sportsground.

After the 1932 premiership, Corowa played off for the unofficial championships of North Eastern Victoria against the 1932 Ovens & King Football League premiers, Wangaratta Football Club in Corowa on Saturday, 1 October. Wangaratta defeated Corowa by 12 points.

In 1934, coached by Ray Le Peyre, Corowa were runners up, remarkably to a team called the Border United FC (a 1933 merger club between East Albury & Weir United) in the O&MFA Grand Final, played on the Albury Sportsground. In 1936, Border United FC would merge with the Albury Football Club when both clubs were short of players and both in debt and took on the name of Albury Football Club.

In 1936, Corowa played with a newly designed jumper, which was all black with a red V across the front and a white number on the rear, which was adopted at the club's AGM.

In 1936, Corowa Recreation Reserve hosted the O&MFL grand final in which Wangaratta Football Club defeated Rutherglen Football Club.

In 1937, former Richmond and Footscray player, Rupert Gibb was appointed as coach.

In 1938 the Corowa Rovers Football Club was formed and entered the Chiltern & District Football League. In 1939 they were captained by Frank "Gunboat" Smith and lost the grand final to the Howlong Football Club. Unfortunately the club disbanded in early 1940 due to World War II, with many young local players joining the military.

In 1939, Corowa FC did not record a win for the season, losing 15 consecutive matches.

In 1941, Len Woods, a 1940 recruit from Rennie Football Club, did pre-season training with South Melbourne Football Club.

In 1941 there appears to be no official Corowa FC meetings held or friendly matches reported in the local paper, the Corowa Free Press.

But in 1942, a local Corowa Military Football Association competition was set up between the "Corowa Town" FC (mainly local Corowa FC players) and the Royal Australian Air Force (RAAF) and the Australian Imperial Force (AIF), whose teams were made up of many interstate soldiers based in Corowa, with the RAAF defeating Corowa Town in the grand final, played on the Corowa Recreation Reserve.

In 1943, Corowa FC footballers played a number of friendly matches against other local nearby towns under the banner of both the Royal Hotel and Star Hotel, Corowa, using the names Corowa Royals FC and also the Corowa Stars FC, to raise much-needed funds for the local Prisoner of War Appeal and they played for the "Corowa Hostelry Premiership", with the Royals winning by two points.

In 1944, the Border United FC was reformed and they entered the Murray Valley Patriotic Football League, with all funds going to charity. Border United finished runner up to Tungamah Football Club in 1944 and were runners up to Wangaratta Football Club in 1945.

Border United FC played in the O&MFL in 1946 and 1947, with Keith Williams, winning the 1947 O&MFL Morris Medal, prior to heading down to play with Fitzroy Football Club in 1948.

In November 1946, former Richmond Football Club premiership player, Leo Merrett was initially appointed as coach for the 1947 season, but was refused a clearance. The club then appointed former Fitzroy Football Club premiership player, Ken Sier, but his clearance was also refused. The club finally has success with a VFL clearance and appointed former 1944 Fitzroy Football Club premiership player, Stan Wright as captain / coach for the 1947 season. Wright, after injuring his knee in round one, returned in round six against Yarrawonga Football Club, but "his knee could not stand the strain" and he resigned. Border United officials then signed up South Melbourne Football Club player, Tom Roulent as coach, but his clearance was also refused. Former local player Ray "Nana" Baker then took over as coach for the remainder of the season.

In 1947, South Corowa Football Club was formed and entered a team in the Coreen & District Football League and were coached by former, Fitzroy and North Melbourne player, Neville Huggins and played their home games at the Corowa Racecourse. In 1949, South Corowa lost the grand final by four points to Wahgunyah Football Club at Coreen and were coached by W. Chisnall.

In 1947, the Wahgunyah Football Club reformed after World War II and joined the Coreen & District Football League.

Border United lost the 1947 O&MFL Preliminary Final to Benalla at Rutherglen, after being in front at half time.

At the Annual General Meeting of the Border United Football Club in Corowa on Thursday, 5 February 1948 it was moved that the club be dissolved and the Corowa Football Club be formed and all assets and liabilities and all its rights and privileges be assumed by the Corowa Football Club.

In early 1949, Corowa FC established a reserves football team, known as the Corowa Stars Football Club and entered the Chiltern & District Football Association. They wore a black football jumper, with a red star on the front.

In 1949, Denis "Dinny" Carroll trained with the Essendon Football Club during their pre-season.

On Saturday, 1 October 1949, Corowa FC / O&MFL hosted the Essendon Football Club in a friendly match on the Corowa Recreation Reserve, with Essendon winning a close match against the O&MFL.

In 1950, Bill King coached both Corowa FC (O&MFL) and Corowa Stars FC (Chiltern & DFL).

In July 1950, Ken Hansen played in the New South Wales state team on the half back line at the national football carnival held in Brisbane, Queensland.

In September 1950, Corowa hosted Camberwell Football Club in a match at the Corowa Recreation Reserve.

In round 16, 1951 a young Rennie Football Club player, Jim Sandral made his Ovens and Murray Football League debut (on a permit from the Coreen & District Football League) for Corowa FC against Wangaratta Football Club, on the Wangaratta Showgrounds and made "an impressive debut". Sandral also played on permit against Wangaratta Rovers Football Club in round two, 1954, before playing a full season with Corowa in 1955 then playing in Melbourne Football Club's 1956 VFL Grand Final premiership, before returning as Corowa's Captain / Coach in 1958 and 1959.

In 1952, the Corowa Stars FC (Corowa Reserves) won the premiership in the Chiltern & District Football Association against Chiltern Football Club played in Wodonga and were coached by Fred Webb, a former captain of Sandringham Football Club.

At the 1953 Chiltern & District Football League – AGM, the Corowa Star FC successfully applied for a clearance to Ovens and Murray Football League to play in the newly formed O&MFL Reserves competition.

In 1953, Corowa player, Brian Crisfield trained with the Melbourne Football Club during their pre-season after Corowa coach, Tom Lahiff recommended Crisfield to Melbourne.

In 1953, Corowa reserves side won the O&MFL Reserve grade football premiership, defeating Albury Football Club and were coached by Jack Bartlett.

In 1954, former Tasmanian, Bill Byrne was appointed coach.

Two Corowa players, Keith Schmidt and Leo Farrell trained with the Collingwood Football Club during the 1954 pre-season and apparently showed some promising form.

In 1954, William Dicks with 17 votes, was runner up to Benalla's Kevin Hurley, on 19 votes in the O&MFL Morris Medal.

In April 1957, Corowa South FC withdrew from the Coreen & District Football League and subsequently folded.

In 1965, Corowa appointed former Footscray player, John Hoiles as captain/coach.

In 1968 former Richmond Football Club player, Fred Swift coached Corowa to a premiership against Wodonga Football Club.

In 1973, Corowa FC entered a "Thirds" team in the new Ovens and Murray Football League Under 18 competition.

The club merged with the Rutherglen FC in 1979, forming the Corowa-Rutherglen Football Club.

== Football leagues ==
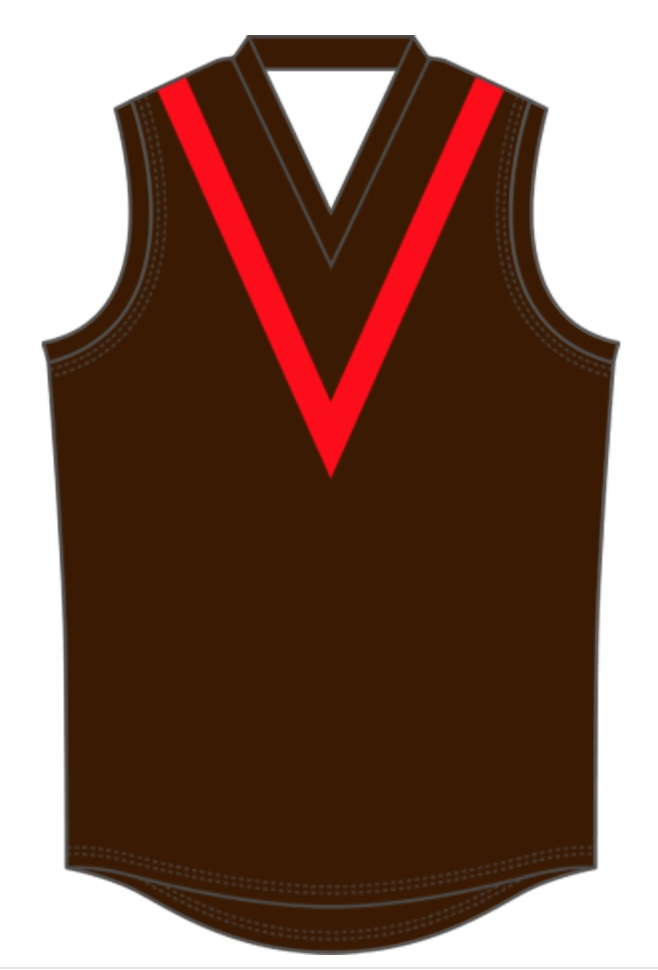
1937 - Corowa FC Jumper

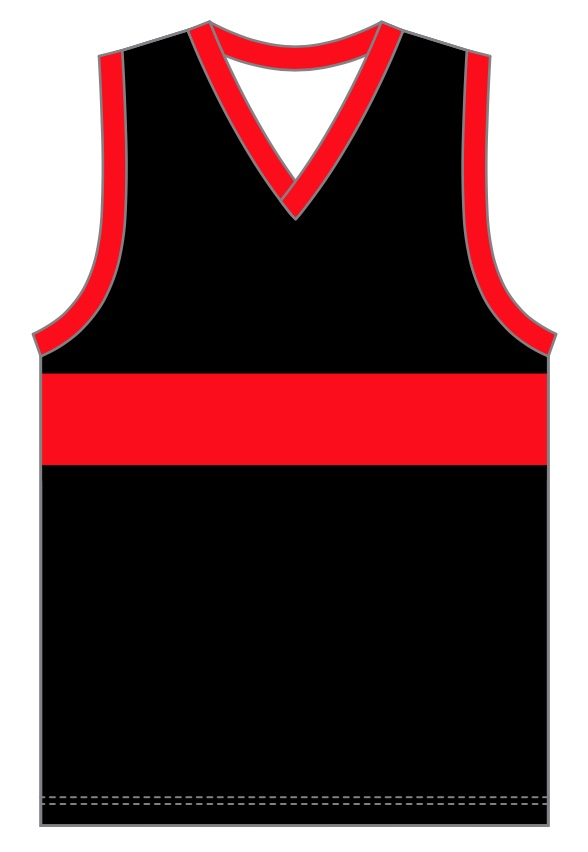
1944 to 1947 - Border United FC Jumper

Corowa FC and / or Border United FC have played in the following football competitions since 1895.

- Ovens & Murray Football League
  - 1895–1905 (Border United FC)
- Corowa and District Football Association
  - 1906 and 1907 (Corowa FC)
- Ovens & Murray Football League
  - 1908 and 1909 (Corowa FC)
- Rutherglen & District Football Association
  - 1911 to 1912 (Corowa FC)
- Ovens & Murray Football League
  - 1913 to 1915, (Border United FC)
- World War I (O&MFA / Club in recess)
  - 1916, 1917 & 1918
- Rutherglen & Murray Football Association
  - 1918 (Border United FC)
- Ovens & Murray Football League
  - 1919 (Border United FC)
- Coreen & District Football League
  - 1920 (Corowa FC)
- Ovens & Murray Football League
  - 1921 to 1940 (Corowa FC)
- World War II (O&MFA / Club in recess)
  - 1941 to 1945.
- Corowa Military Football Association
  - 1942 (Corowa Town FC)
- Murray Valley Patriotic Football League
  - 1944 & 1945 (Border United FC)
- Ovens & Murray Football League
  - 1946 & 1947 (Border United FC)
- Ovens & Murray Football League
  - 1948 to 1978 (Corowa FC)
- Chiltern & District Football Association
  - 1949 to 1952 (Corowa Stars FC) – Corowa FC Reserves/2nd 18
- Ovens & Murray Football League
  - 1979 to 2026 (Corowa / Rutherglen FNC)

(Merged with Rutherglen Redlegs and formed Corowa-Rutherglen Roos in 1979; additionally surplus players formed the Rutherglen-Corowa Cats in 1979).

== Football premierships ==
- North East Region (unofficial premiers)
  - 1880, 1889
- Corowa & District Football Association
  - 1906
- Coreen & District Football League
  - 1920
- Chiltern & District Football Association
  - 1927 Corowa Stars FC – (Corowa FC Reserves / 2nd 18)
- Leeton Football Club – Knockout Competition
  - 1946 (Border United FC), 1948
- Corowa & District Football Knockout Competition – "VFL Cup"
  - 1949
- Chiltern & District Football Association
  - 1952 Corowa Stars FC – (Corowa FC Reserves / 2nd 18)
- Hume Junior Football League
  - 1962 - Corowa FC Under 19's
- Ovens & Murray Football League
  - Seniors: (2) 1932, 1968
  - Reserves: (1) 1953

== Runners up ==
- Ovens & Murray Football League
  - Seniors:
    - Border United: 1900, 1902, 1903, 1904, 1914.
    - Corowa: 1921, 1934, 1963
  - Reserves: 1973
- Murray Valley Patriotic Football League
  - Seniors: Border United:
    - 1944, 1945

== Club Records/Statistics ==
Senior Football

- Most consecutive wins in a row
  - ?
- Most Games
  - 288 - Kevin Witherden
- Most Career Goals
  - 559 - Kevin Witherden
- Most club goal kicking awards
  - 8 - Kevin Witherden
- Most goals kicked in one match
  - 13 - Ray "Nana" Baker v Rutherglen Rd.1, 1931
- Most club best & fairest wins
  - 4 - Jim Sandral
- Most league best and fairest wins
  - 3 - Jim Sandral

== Team of the Century ==
Team of the Century
B:	Frank King	Denis Sandral	Lou Jackson ^{5}
HB:	W. "Bill" Francis	Jim Sandral	John "Juice" Kingston
C:	Alan Dunn	W. "Bill" Gayfer	W. "Chic" O'Donoghue ^{3}
HF:	D. "Dinny" Carroll ^{2}	Norm Hawking	George Tobias ^{1}
F:	Arthur Francis	Ray "Nana" Baker	Alan McCauley
Foll:	Mark Mills ^{4}	Jack King	John Clancy
Int:	John Lane	Alan Way	Carl Dickins
Coach:	Peter Tossol		

Team reference

- Border United (1877 - 1905, 1914 - 1919, 1944 - 1947)
- Corowa (1906 - 1913, 1920 to 1943, 1948 - 78)
- Rutherglen (1903–78)
- Corowa-Rutherglen (1979–2003)

Notes

- ^{1} George Tobias played mainly with the Corowa FC. He was also a foundation player for the Corowa-Rutherglen FC in 1979
- ^{2} Dinny Carroll also played with the Border United FC in 1947.
- ^{3} W Chic O'Donoghue also played with the Border United FC in 1946 and 1947.
- ^{4} Mark Mills played with Corowa FC and Corowa / Rutherglen FC.
- ^{5} Lou Jackson played mainly with Rutherglen FC, but also played with Border United FC in 1900 and with Lake Rovers in 1911.

== Ovens and Murray Football League – Best and Fairest winners ==
- O&MFL – Senior Football – Morris Medal winners
  - 1947. Keith Williams (with Border United FC)
  - 1959. Jim Sandral
  - 1962. Jim Sandral
  - 1964. Jim Sandral
  - 1965. Alby Dunn
  - 1970. John Clancy
  - 1971. John Clancy
  - 1974. Alan Way
  - 1978. Mark Mills
- O&MFL – Reserves Football (The Ralph Marks Medal – 1953 to 1970)
  - 1954. Ernie Aiken – Was the equal winner of this award, but lost on a count back & received a retrospective medal in 2024.
  - 1955. Jack Rippingale
  - 1961. John Dormer
  - 1962. Mick Seymour
  - 1964. Kerry Seymour
  - 1966. Mick Seymour
- O&MFL – Thirds Football
  - 1978. John Clohessy

== Ovens and Murray Football League – Hall of Fame inductees ==
- 2005 – Jim Sandral
- 2009 – John Clancy
- 2009 - Denis Sandral
- 2013 – Jim Sandral – Upgraded to "Legend" status

== Corowa FC players who played in the VFL ==
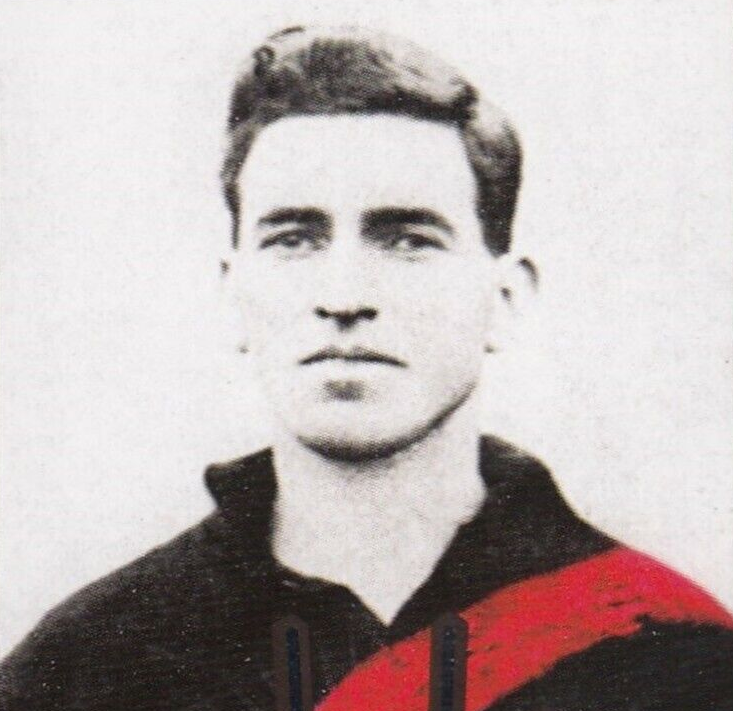
Greg Stockdale

The following players played football with Corowa, prior to playing senior football in the VFL, with the year indicating their VFL debut.

- 1900 – Charlie Roland – Carlton. Charlie Roland played with the Border United FC between 1894 and 1898.
- 1903 – Fred Nixon – St. Kilda
- 1920 – Greg Stockdale – Essendon
- 1924 – Alby Anderson – St. Kilda & Richmond
- 1929 – Frank Whitty – Hawthorn
- 1932 – John Connell – St. Kilda. Connell played with the Corowa Stars FC in 1930.
- 1937 – Vic Carroll – Fitzroy
- 1948 – Keith Williams – Fitzroy. Williams played with Border United FC in 1945, 46 & 47.
- 1956 – Jim Sandral – Melbourne
- 1957 – Bill Byrne – Melbourne
- 1963 – Max Urquhart – Collingwood
- 1964 – Robert Longmire – Collingwood
- 1966 – Greg Lambert – South Melbourne
- 1968 – Peter Chisnall – North Melbourne
- 1968 – George McInnes – Richmond
- 1969 – Lindsay Jacob – North Melbourne
- 1976 – Paul O'Donoghue – North Melbourne

The following footballers played senior VFL football prior to playing / coaching with Corowa FC, with the year indicating their first year at Corowa FC.

- 1914 - Dick Fitzgerald - South Melbourne
- 1924 - Rex De Garis - St. Kilda
- 1925 - Fred G Johnson - Carlton
- 1928 - Albert Anderson - St. Kilda & Richmond
- 1930 - Bert Smedley - St. Kilda
- 1931 - Aubrey McKenzie - Footscray
- 1937 - Rupert Gibb - Richmond & Footscray
- 1947 - Stan Wright - Fitzroy
- 1948 - Laurie Taylor - Richmond
- 1949 - Bill King - South Melbourne
- 1950 - Tom Lahiff - Essendon, South Melbourne & Hawthorn
- 1960 - Frank Tuck - Collingwood
- 1965 - John Hoiles - Footscray
- 1965 - Alby Dunn - South Melbourne
- 1968 - Fred Swift - Richmond
- 1978 - Norm Smith - Hawthorn

== Club Honour Board ==
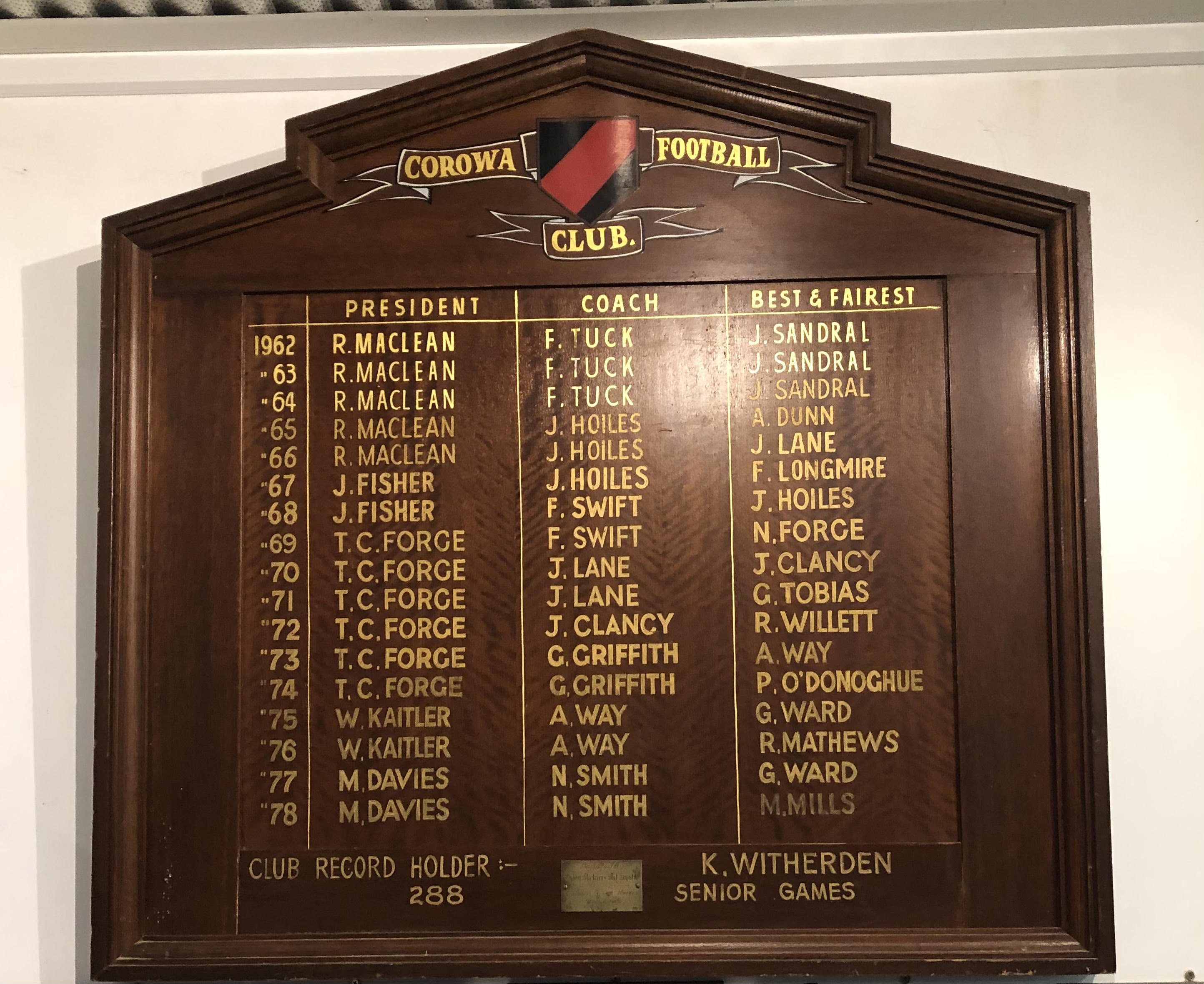
Corowa FC Honour Board. 1962 - 1978

The club's honour board displays every year from 1877 to 1978, including the years the club was known as either the Border United Football Club or the Corowa Football Club.

- 1877 to 1905 – Border United FC
- 1906 to 1913 – Corowa FC
- 1914 to 1919 – Border United FC
- 1920 to 1943 – Corowa FC
- 1944 to 1947 – Border United FC
- 1948 to 1978 – Corowa FC

The senior football best and fairest award title has had a number of different names over the years -

- 1930 - The Reverend Father Bonnar's Gold Medal
- 1935 - The S C Janson Cup (Janson's Sports Store)
- 1937 to 1940 - The "Maples Medal", donated by Maples Furniture Store Ltd.
- 1944 & 1945 - Les Harper Cup (Harper's Empire Hotel)

Year	Patron	President	Secretary	Treasurer	Captain/Coach	Best & Fairest	Top Goalkicker	Position
1877		?	?	?	W H McCutchan			
1878		?	?	?	Jacob Levin			
1879		Captain R Hare	?	?	Jacob Levin			
1880		Captain R Hare	H E Whitton	H E Whitton	Jacob Levin			won 8, lost 1. NE Premiers
1881		Captain R Hare	J F Donnelly	?	Jacob Levin		9 – Clark	won 4, lost 1, drew 3
1882		Captain R Hare	J F Donnelly	J F Donnelly	J Chivell			
1883		Captain R Hare	J F Donnelly	J Carns	J Carns			
1884		Captain R Hare	S Chenhall	J Carns	J Carns			
1885		Dr D Loughrey	S Chenhall	J Carns	R Thompson	George Clayton		
1886		P H Carne	Dave Thomson	Alex Thomson	Jas Nugent			
1887	P S Carne	Dr D Loughrey	Dave Thomson	Alex Thomson	Jas Nugent			won 4, lost 1, drew 1
1888		Dr D Loughrey	Dave Thomson	Alex Thomson	Jas Nugent	Robert Yates		won 6, lost 1, drew 2
1889		P K Richie	Dave Thomson	Alex Thomson	Jas Nugent			won 6, drew 4. NE Premiers
1890		P K Richie	Dave Thomson	Dave Thomson	James Nugent			won 6, lost 3
1891		P K Richie	Dave Thomson	Dave Thomson	James Kennedy			
1892		P K Richie	James Nugent	Dave Thomson	Tom Yates			
1893		P K Richie	Dave Thomson	James Nugent	Oscar Kuschert			
1894		P K Richie	?	George Parkin	Oscar Kuschert			
1895	Henry A Hay & W Wallace	P K Richie	James Taylor	George Parkin	Oscar Kuschert		8 – Coleman	O&M
1896	J P Buggy	P K Richie	James Taylor	Dave Thomson	James Taylor			O&M. 4th
1897	J P Buggy	Albert Camplin	R C Jackson	Dave Thomson	E Coleman			O&M
1898	J Rankin	P K Richie	E Sewell	Albert Camplin	H Moras			O&M
1899	H Hay & H Balme	Dr. Alfred N Chenhall	J Taylor	E Sewell	J Taylor	E Coleman		O&M
1900		Dr. Alfred N Chenhall	C W L Craig	?	?			O&M
1901		?	C W L Craig & A E Sewell	?	J Taylor			O&M
1902	Henry A Hay	J A Taylor	L Rankin	Mr Rankin	?			O&M
1903	Tim J Kelly	P K Richie	E Woodman	A Camplin	Sen Coleman			O&M
1904	Tim J Kelly	P K Richie	E Woodman	Tim J Kelly	Anstey	W King		O&M. won 6, lost 4
1905	Henry A Hay	A Camplin	E Woodman	E Woodman	Coleman	N/A		O&M. no wins
1906	Henry A Hay	J Jensen	A V Richie	J P Galbraith	J Crisfield	N/A		Corowa & DFL. won 7, lost 1. Premiers
1907	Henry A Hay	R O'Leary	A V Richie	J P Galbraith	E Sewell			won 2, lost 7, abandoned 1.
1908	Henry A Hay	J Chivell	J Yule	J P Galbraith	A Jackson			O&M
1909	Henry A Hay	J Chivell	Chas Jackson	J P Galbraith				O&M
1910								CFC in recess
1911	Henry A Hay	J P Buggy	J A Taylor & Jas Yule	J A Taylor	Thomas Parsons	W McLeilan		Rutherglen & DFA
1912	Henry A Hay	J P Buggy	J A Taylor & F Leonard	J A Taylor	Olgivie	L Crispfield &		Rutherglen & DFA
						J Luxton		
1913	Henry A Hay	A C Leslie	J A Taylor	J A Taylor	P Nugent			O&M
1914	Henry A Hay	George F Vincent	J A Taylor	J A Taylor	A Kuschert/Cushin			O&M. 2nd, won 5, lost 3
1915	Henry A Hay	George F Vincent	J A Taylor	J A Taylor	P Nugent	N/A		O&M
1915			J Power & C Gribble					Took over from Taylor
1916		George F Vincent	J A Taylor	T Stackpool				O&M/BUFC in recess
1917								O&M/BUFC in recess
1918					J Webster			Rutherglen & Murray FA. 3rd
1919		F Pallott	J W Crum & G N Fuller		Frank Fitzgerald			O&M
1920		William Anderson	Mr Jackson		Frank Fitzgerald			Coreen & DFA. Premiers
1921		William Anderson	J Comerford	J Comerford	Frank Fitzgerald			O&MFL. 2nd
1922	Harry A Hay Jnr	William Anderson	J R Beaman	T M Stackpool	R H Williams			O&MFL. 3rd
1923	Harry A Hay Jnr	William Anderson	R J Beaman &	G Slattery	H F Martin			O&MFL. 3rd
			James Russell &					1 month appointment
			Frank Galbraith					new secretary
1924	Harry A Hay Jnr	W Yott	G M Handasyde	W Parker	Rex De Garis			O&MFL. 3rd
1925	Harry A Hay Jnr	T H Wade	F A Simmons	W Parker	Fred G Johnson			O&M. 7th
1926	12 x Patrons	T H Wade	F A Simmons	J Curtain	Frank Huggard			O&MFL. 6th
					Maurie Sheahan			
1927		T H Wade	F A Simmons	J Curtain	Gerald Gleeson			O&M. 7th
1928		T H Wade	J Curtain/M Rosier	F A Simmons	Albert Anderson			O&MFL. 6th
1929		T H Wade	W M Johnson	J Curtain	Albert Anderson			O&M. 5th
1930		Rev John Bonnar	J A Munro	A Field	Bert Smedley	Ray Baker		O&M. 6th
1931		Aubrey McKenzie &	Thomas Howell	R Grace &	Aubrey McKenzie &		74 – Ray Baker	O&MFL. 2nd
		Albert Anderson		J McLean	Frank Smith			
1932		M J Roberts	Thomas Howell	J McLean	Ray Baker			O&MPremiers, won 13, lost 2
1933	?	M J Roberts	Thomas Howell	J McLean	Ray Baker			O&MFL. 3rd
1934	?	M J Roberts	Thomas Howell	J McLean	Ray Le Peyre			O&MFL. 2nd
1935	?	Ray Le Peyre &	Thomas Howell &	J McLean	Ray Le Peyre &	Thomas Wells		O&MFL. 4th
		R Sweeting	Rod Wilding		Ray Baker			
1936		R Sweeting	S C Janson	H J Macey	Ray Baker			O&MFL. 4th
1937		R Sweeting	S C Janson	H J Macey	Rupert Gibb &	Bob Whinray		O&MFL. 5th
					Ray Le Peyre			
1938		P W Pritchard	Ron Wilding	S C Janson	Ray Baker	Frank Bell		O&MFL. 5th
1939		P W Pritchard	John Strong	S C Janson	G Naylor	A C Yates		O&MFL. 6th
1940		P W Pritchard		S C Janson	Frank Bell			O&MFL. 6th
1941		?						
1942		?			T Davies			CMFA – 2nd
1943		?						
1944		Norman Greig	R Eales	Mrs D Thomas	Pte Joe Alexander	Peter Gale	? 27 plus. Keith Thomason	MVPFA. 2nd
1945	George S Smith	Norman Greig &	Keith Doyle &	Mrs D Thomas	W Grantley W Bryant	Peter Gale &	? 36 plus. Keith Thomason	MVPFA. 2nd
		Fred A Mason	G O'Donnell			Keith Williams		
1946	George S Smith &	Fred A Mason	G O'Connell &	Tom Papworth	J Ross/Ray Baker	?	? 27 – Robert Tait	O&M. 5th
	Charles Ruwolt		Wes Turner					
1947	George S Smith &	H R Roy Freddricks	T Ash	Tom Papworth	Stan Wright &	Peter Gale	46* – Keith Thomason	O&M. 3rd
	Charles Ruwolt				Jack O'Donoghue			
1948	George S Smith &	H R Roy Freddricks	S Buckley &	J G Gray	Laurie Taylor	W "Bill" Witherden	28 – Frank Caddan	O&M. 6th
	Charles Ruwolt		R Watts				? 28 – Keith Thomason	
1949		Eric Skehan	S Buckley &	John Strong &	Bill King	W "Chic" O'Donoughue	28* – Ken Hansen	O&M. 3rd
			J S Pritchard	B Wright				
1950		George J Bott	Mr. Kelly	Matt Lane	Bill King	W "Chic" O'Donoughue	? 32 plus Jack Rippingale	O&M. 6th
1951	.	Dinny Dowd	Jack Bartlett	Matt Lane	Tom Lahiff	Dinny Carroll	? 22 plus Tom Lahiff	O&M. 10th
1952		George J Bott			Tom Lahiff	Jack Tyrrell	? 16 plus – Brian Crisfield	O&M. 10th
1953		J Bartlett	E Landon	?	Keith Williams	Dinny Carroll	? 27 plus Keith Williams	O&M. 9th
1954		S J Selby	Kevin Molan	G Rosser	Bill Byrne	William "Willy" Dicks	? 28 plus Bill Dicks	O&M. 9th. 4/14
1955		H R Roy Freddricks	Kevin Molan		Bill Byrne	Rex Bennett		O&M. 6th 8/10
1956		Les Hancock			Norm Minns	Leo Farrell		O&M. 8th 5/13
1957					Norm Minns	Leo Farrell		O&M. 10th (last) 2/16
1958					Jim Sandral	Vin Fitzgerald		O&M.
1959					Jim Sandral	John Voss	?: Don Spencer	O&M. 9th:
1960					Frank Tuck	Jim Sandral	60: Kevin Witherden	O&M. 6th: 7/10/1
1961					Frank Tuck	Max Urquhart	37: G Swasbrick	O&M. 4th: 12/6
1962		Ray Maclean			Frank Tuck	Jim Sandral	27: Don Spencer	O&M.1st: 13/4/1
1963		Ray Maclean			Frank Tuck	Jim Sandral	?: Barry Matthews	O&M. 2nd
1964		Ray Maclean			Frank Tuck	Jim Sandral	60: Kevin Witherden	O&M.
1965		Ray Maclean			John Hoiles	Alby Dunn	47: Kevin Witherden	O&M.
1966		Ray Maclean			John Hoiles	John Lane	62: Kevin Witherden	O&M.
1967		J Fisher			John Hoiles	Fred Longmire	60: Kevin Witherden	O&M: 10th. 2 wins / 16 losses
1968		J Fisher			Fred Swift	John Hoiles	53: Kevin Witherden	O&M. 4th. 11/7. Premiers
1969		T C Forge			Fred Swift	Neville Forge	67: Kevin Witherden	O&M. 5th. 11/7
1970		T C Forge			John Lane	John Clancy	70: Kevin Witherden	O&M.5th 9/9
1971		T C Forge			John Lane	George Tobias		O&M. 8th. 5/13
1972		T C Forge			John Clancy	Ray Willett	30: John Clancy	O&M. 8th. 5/13
1973		T C Forge			George Griffiths	Alan Way		O&M. 8th. 5/12/1
1974		T C Forge			George Griffiths	Paul O'Donoghue	38: Gavin Jones	O&M. 7th. 6/12
1975		W Kaitler			Alan Way	Gerald Ward		O&M. 10th. 2/16
1976		W Kaitler			Alan Way	Roger Matthews	37: Gavin Jones	O&M. 10th. 2/16
1977		Michael Davies			Norm Smith	Gerald Ward	?: George Tobias	O&M. 10th. 4/14
1978		Michael Davies			Norm Smith	Mark Mills	?: George Tobias	O&M. 7th. 5/13
Corowa Rutherglen Football Club: 1979 - to present day
1979		L J Francis	B Rosser	B Rowley	Peter Chisnall	Chris Killeen	69: George Tobias	O&M. 3rd. 11/7 Merged with Rutherglen
Year	Patron	President	Secretary	Treasurer	Coach	Best & Fairest	Top Goalkicker	Position

- Goalkickers:
  - – ? Means incomplete goals or no goal tallies in some match reviews in newspapers.
  - – * includes goals kicked in finals.
  - - Ladder position is at the end of the home & away series of matches.

== Reserves Honourboard ==
Year	Captain/Coach	Best & Fairest	Top Goalkicker	Position	Comments
1949 - 1952: Corowa Stars FC - Chiltern & District Football Association
1949	Jack O'Donoghue	Hurst "Herb" Rettallick		7th: 3 wins/11 losses	
1950	Bill King	E Watts			
1951	Fred Webb	Peter Gale			
1952	Fred Webb	Howard Fitzgibbon		1st	
1953 to 1978: Corowa FC Ovens & Murray Football League
1953	Jack Bartlett	W Filliponi		1st	
1954	Jack Bartlett	Ernie Aitken			
1955		George Aitken			
1956		Howard Fitzgibbon			
1957		R Watts			
1958		Mick Seymour			
1959		Mick Seymour			
1960	Frank McNamara	Mick Seymour			
1961		"Kit" Carson			
1962		Mick Seymour	Mick Seymour		
1963		Ian Nixon	Don Spencer		
1964		Kerry Seymour			
1965		Kerry Seymour			
1966		Peter Seymour			
1967				9th: 2/16	
1968		Ron Bull		8th: 4/14	
1969					
1970		Phillip Eales		8th: 7/11	
1971			?: Don Spencer*		
1972			40: Don Spencer		
1973		Gavin Jones		4th: 10/8 Runner Up	
1974		Peter Scott			
1975		Brian Houlihan			
1976		Len Reynoldson		9th: 3/15	
1977		Peter Scott			
1978		Jim Eyers	?: Neville Tait		
Year	Captain/Coach	Best & Fairest	Top Goalkicker	Position	Comments

- - 1971 - Don Spencer also won the O&MFL Reserves goalkicking award.

== Thirds Honourboard ==
Year	Coach	Best & Fairest	Top Goalkicker	Position	Comments
1973 - 1978: Corowa FC Under 18 / Thirds
1973	Arthur Irvine	Robert Ash		9th. 3 wins/15 losses	
1974	Arthur Irvine	Bill Hetherington			
1975		Anthony Carroll			
1976		Anthony Carroll		7th: 6/12	
1977		Danny Erickson			
1978		Craig Horwood	?: Alan Mapleson		
