= Ennals =

Ennals is a surname. Notable people with this surname include:

- Brian Ennals, American rapper
- David Ennals, Baron Ennals (1922–1995), British politician and human rights campaigner
- Martin Ennals (1927–1991), British human rights activist
- Paul Ennals (born 20th century), British chairperson
- Peter Ennals (born 1943), Australian rules footballer

== See also ==
- Martin Ennals Award for Human Rights Defenders
