= Dalitz =

Dalitz is a surname. Notable people with the surname include:

- Alwin Dalitz (1894–1969), Australian rules footballer
- Moe Dalitz (1899–1989), American gangster, businessman, casino owner, and philanthropist
- Richard Dalitz (1925–2006), Australian physicist

== See also ==
- Dalit
