= Hoiles =

Hoiles is a surname. Notable people with the surname include:

- Chris Hoiles (born 1965), American baseball player
- John Hoiles (disambiguation), multiple people
- Stephen Hoiles (born 1981), Australian rugby union footballer
- Raymond C. Hoiles (1878–1970), American newspaper owner
