= John Hoiles =

John Hoiles may refer to:

- John E. Hoiles (born 1938), Australian rules footballer, father of John M. Hoiles
- John M. Hoiles (born 1961), Australian rules footballer, son of John E. Hoiles
