= Alby Anderson =

Australian rules footballer (1894–1980)

Personal information
- Full name: Albert Anderson
- Born: 26 August 1894; Wagga Wagga, New South Wales
- Died: 20 November 1980 (aged 86); New South Wales
- Original teams: Mangoplah, Royal Stars, Wagga United Football Association.
- Height: 183 cm (6 ft 0 in)
- Weight: 83 kg (183 lb)

Playing career^{1}
Years	Club	Games (Goals)
1924	St Kilda	10 (7)
1926	Richmond	4 (0)
Total		14 (7)
- ^{1} Playing statistics correct to the end of 1926.

Albert Anderson (26 August 1894 – 20 November 1980) was an Australian rules footballer who played for the St Kilda Football Club and Richmond Football Club in the Victorian Football League (VFL).

== Family ==
One of the ten children of John Anderson (1846-1915), and Georgina Anderson (1854-1922), née Hacon, Albert Anderson was born at Wagga Wagga, New South Wales on 26 August 1894.

== Military service ==
He enlisted in the First AIF on 20 April 1916 and served overseas in France, returning to Australia in 1919.

== Football ==
"Albert was a strongly built, versatile player who could play in the ruck and as a ruck-rover or centre-half-forward."

Anderson played for Mangoplah from 1919 to 1922, including their 1919 premiership, then with Royal Stars in the 1923 Wagga United Football Association Grand Final that was won by the Federals, prior to playing with St. Kilda in 1924.

In 1925, Anderson spent the season with Hume Weir FC in the Ovens & Murray Football League, with former Mangoplah & St. Kilda teammate Tim Archer, who was the coach of Hume Weir in 1925., Hume Weir lost the 1925 grand final to Wangaratta.

Anderson then returned to the VFL, playing 4 senior games and 7 reserve games with Richmond in the 1926 season.

In late April 1927, Anderson was granted a permit by from Richmond to the Albury Football Club in the Ovens & Murray Football League. He then coached Corowa Football Club in the Ovens & Murray Football League in 1928 and 1929.

Anderson subsequently transferred to the Hampden Football League to play with Warrnambool Football Club from 1934 to 1936, playing in the 1935 premiership and leading them into the 1936 grand final as captain / coach, that they lost to Mortlake. Anderson then stayed in Warrnambool, working for the Shell Petrol Company.
