= Tom Strownix =

Australian rules footballer

Personal information
- Full name: Thomas Strownix
- Born: 2 May 1886; Yorketown, South Australia
- Died: 9 August 1971 (aged 85); Croydon, Victoria
- Original team: Nhill
- Height: 178 cm (5 ft 10 in)
- Weight: 86 kg (190 lb)
- Position: Defence

Playing career^{1}
Years	Club	Games (Goals)
1911	South Melbourne	14 (1)
1912–14	Fitzroy	20 (0)
Total		34 (1)
- ^{1} Playing statistics correct to the end of 1914.

Tom Strownix (2 May 1886 – 9 August 1971) was an Australian rules footballer who played with South Melbourne and Fitzroy in the Victorian Football League (VFL).
