= Jack Connell (footballer) =

Australian rules footballer, born 1912

Personal information
- Full name: John Thomas Connell
- Born: 24 August 1912; Brighton, Melbourne, Victoria
- Died: 25 March 1983 (aged 70); Fairfield, Melbourne, Victoria
- Original teams: Corowa Stars, Wangaratta
- Height: 189 cm (6 ft 2 in)
- Weight: 84 kg (185 lb)
- Position: Centre half forward

Playing career^{1}
Years	Club	Games (Goals)
1932–33, 1935	St Kilda	5 (1)
- ^{1} Playing statistics correct to the end of 1935.

John Thomas Connell (24 August 1912 – 25 March 1983) was an Australian rules footballer who played with St Kilda in the Victorian Football League (VFL).

Connell played with the Corowa Stars in 1930 in the Corowa & District Football Association and then with the Wangaratta Football Club in 1931 and 1932 in the Ovens & King Football League.

Connell was granted a permit by the VFL in June 1932 from Wangaratta to St. Kilda to play in their Reserves side. Connell made his VFL senior debut in round 18, 1932 against Carlton at centre half forward and "made an impressive debut".

Connell starred in St. Kilda's 1933 VFL Reserves one point grand final defeat to Melbourne on the Melbourne Cricket Ground.

Connell married Patrica Alma Webber in December 1933.

Connell played with the Brighton Football Club in the VFA from 1934 to 1940 and in 1934 polled 11 votes in the Association's best and fairest award.

In early 1935, Connell was cleared back to St. Kilda from Brighton and played two senior games in rounds two and three, then several more in the Reserves side, then in June, 1935 Connell was cleared back to Brighton where he played until 1940.
