= William Dicks =

Australian rules footballer

Personal information
- Full name: William James Dicks
- Born: 16 September 1930
- Died: 13 June 2023 (aged 92); Yarrawonga, Victoria
- Original team: Camden
- Height: 173 cm (5 ft 8 in)
- Weight: 71 kg (157 lb)

Playing career^{1}
Years	Club	Games (Goals)
1950–52	St Kilda	9 (9)
- ^{1} Playing statistics correct to the end of 1952.

William James Dicks (16 September 1930 – 13 June 2023) was an Australian rules footballer who played with St Kilda in the Victorian Football League (VFL).

Dicks played with the Corowa Football Club in the Ovens and Murray Football League in 1953 and 1954, winning Corowa's best and fairest award in 1954.

Dicks was runner up in the 1954 Ovens and Murray Football League best and fairest award, the Morris Medal.

Dicks then moved across to Yarrawonga Football Club as captain-coach from 1955 to 1957 where they lost the Preliminary Final to Wangaratta Football Club in 1955.
