= John Longmire =

Australian rules footballer (born 1970)

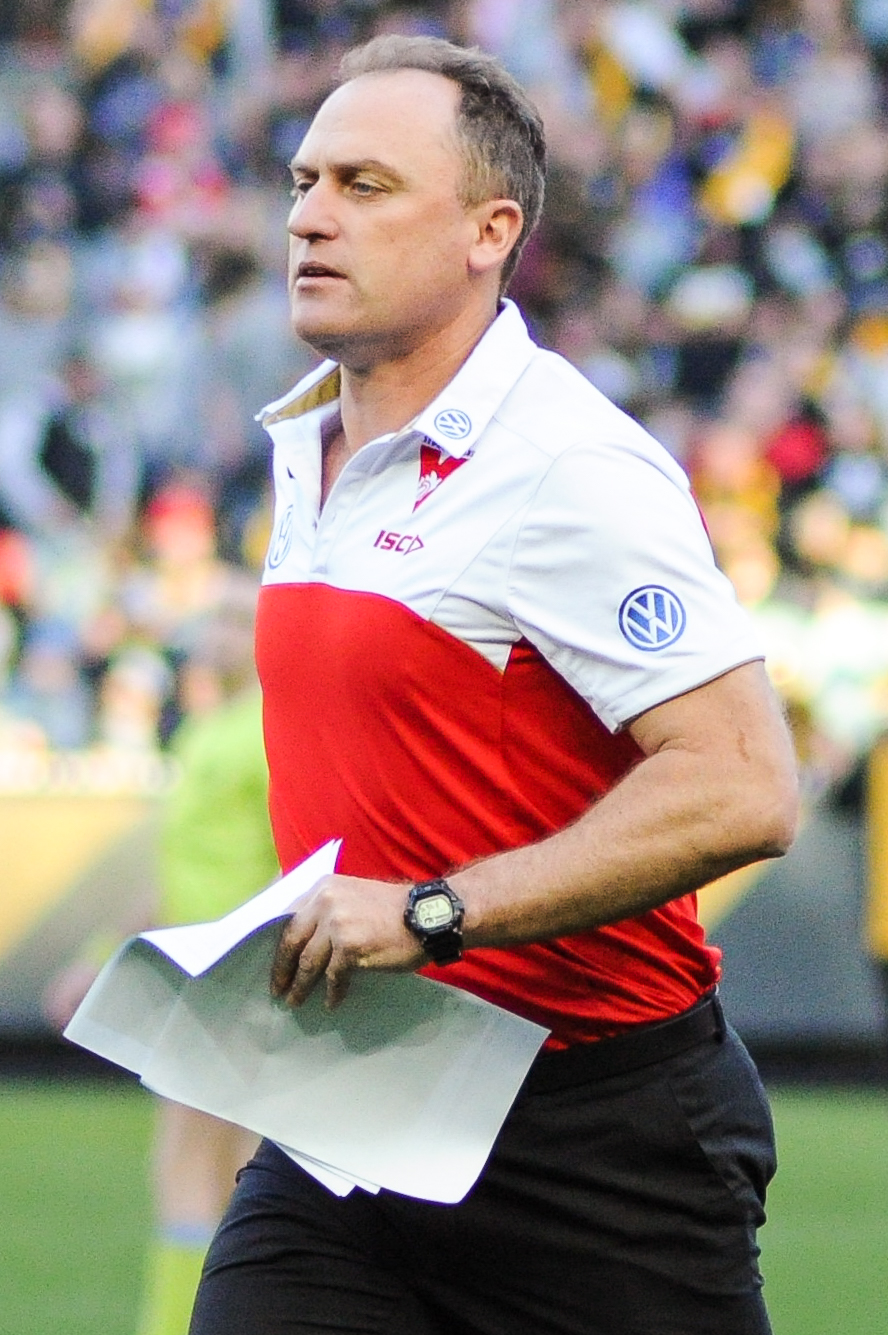
- Longmire in June 2017

Personal information
- Full name: John Longmire
- Nickname: Horse
- Born: 31 December 1970 (age 55); Corowa, New South Wales
- Original team: Corowa Rutherglen (OMFL)
- Height: 194 cm (6 ft 4 in)
- Weight: 102 kg (225 lb)
- Positions: Full-forward, Full-back, Ruckman

Playing career^{1}
Years	Club	Games (Goals)
1988–1999	North Melbourne	200 (511)

Coaching career^{3}
Years	Club	Games (W–L–D)
2011–2024	Sydney	333 (208–122–3)
2020	Representative; All Stars	1 (0–1–0)
- ^{1} Playing statistics correct to the end of 1999.^{3} Coaching statistics correct as of 2024.

Career highlights
- AFL Premiership player: 1999; Coleman Medal: 1990; Syd Barker Medal: 1990; North Melbourne leading Goalkicker: 1990–1994; Sydney Swans Premiership coach: 2012; AFLCA Coach of the Year: 2012, 2014

John Longmire (born 31 December 1970) is the former senior coach of the Sydney Swans in the Australian Football League (AFL) from 2011 to 2024. As a player, he represented the North Melbourne Football Club in the Australian Football League (AFL) from 1988 to 1999.

== Early years ==
Longmire was born in Corowa, New South Wales. He took up Australian rules as a child and first came into notice when he won the 1984 Thirds goal kicking award in the Coreen & District Football League with Rutherglen. He later moved to the Corowa-Rutherglen club, and in his first season of senior football career in New South Wales, he nearly won the Ovens & Murray Football League's leading goalkicker title in 1987 as a 16-year-old, kicking 82 goals. His ability and size quickly attracted the interest of the North Melbourne VFL club's talent scouts.

Longmire's grandfather is former Fitzroy Football Club player Keith Williams. His uncle, Robert Longmire, is a former Collingwood Football Club player. Walter Longmire (John Longmire's great grandfather) represented New South Wales v South Australia at the MCG in 1927.

== Playing career ==
=== North Melbourne ===
Longmire's physique and size earned him the nickname "Horse". His first match for North Melbourne was in the infamous exhibition match between North Melbourne and Carlton at The Oval in London in 1987. His first regular season match for North Melbourne was in the 1988 season against Footscray with a four-goal performance, but he struggled after that and near the end of the season coach John Kennedy Sr. moved him to full-back. He did well in that role during the 1989 season, holding Tony Lockett to five kicks in Round 14, but North's lack of key-position players in attack saw him moved back to the forward line in August.

The 1990 season saw Longmire jump to the top of the competition at only nineteen years of age, where he kicked 98 goals and won the Coleman Medal as the league's leading goalkicker (and the youngest player to have done so). In Round 2 of that year, he kicked a North Melbourne record of twelve goals against Richmond, which he broke twelve weeks later when he kicked fourteen goals in round 14 against Melbourne. Going into the final round, Longmire looked likely to reach the 100-goal milestone for the season; however, inaccurate kicking against a strong Collingwood defence resulted in two goals and eight behinds, leaving him two goals short. Longmire won North Melbourne's best and fairest award that year and led the club's goalkicking list every season from 1990 to 1994.

At North Melbourne, he formed a powerful goalkicking partnership with centre half-forward Wayne Carey. In six seasons between 1990 and 1995, Carey and Longmire collectively kicked 768 goals (of which Longmire contributed 464), and thirteen times they combined for ten goals or more in a game. Individually, Longmire kicked 5-plus goals in a game 36 times, 7-plus goals 18 times, and 10-plus twice, before a serious knee injury forced him out of the game for the 1996 season. When he returned the following year, he played out the remainder of his career in defence and in the ruck.

Longmire missed out on playing on the winning side of the 1996 premiership with a knee injury and just made it back from an elbow injury to make his last career game the 1999 Grand Final, in which the Kangaroos defeated Carlton. This was his only year to also not score a goal, managing only to kick 1 point in 10 games.

Longmire played a total of 200 games and kicked a total of 511 goals for North Melbourne from 1988 to 1999, as well as being a member of the North Melbourne premiership side in 1999.

== Coaching career ==
=== Sydney Swans ===
Longmire returned to New South Wales to take up an assistant coaching position with the Sydney Swans in 2002. In 2006, he was considered to be a front-runner for the St Kilda Football Club senior coaching role, which was made vacant by the sacking of Grant Thomas; however, the role later went to then-fellow Swans assistant coach Ross Lyon. In 2008, senior coach Paul Roos, appointed Longmire the Swans' "coaching co-ordinator". In a succession plan, Longmire replaced Roos as senior coach of the Sydney Swans following Roos' retirement at the end of the 2010 season.

Longmire's first game as the Sydney Swans senior coach in the 2011 season ended in a draw against Melbourne, with both teams scoring 11.18 (84). His first win as senior coach came the next week, against Essendon in Round 2, 2011. Longmire had a relatively good start to his coaching career, with only five losses in the first fourteen rounds of the season (albeit against top-four opposition in Geelong, Carlton (twice), Hawthorn and Collingwood).

One of his best coaching achievements was engineering Sydney's upset 13-point victory over Geelong at Skilled Stadium in the penultimate round of the 2011 season. The Swans had not won there in more than 12 years and the home team had not lost at the ground in exactly four years and one day. Also, the Swans were the only team to beat top-four side West Coast at Patersons Stadium during the season. Those two sides won the rest of their home matches during the regular season.

Longmire took Sydney to the finals in 2011, his first year as senior coach in what was the club's 13th finals appearance in 16 seasons. After beating St Kilda in the elimination finals at Etihad Stadium, the Swans were defeated by Hawthorn in the semi-finals ending what was otherwise a promising first season for Longmire in the top job.

In the 2012 season in his second year as senior coach, Longmire led Sydney to third place on the AFL ladder, compiling a 16–6 record in the home-and-away season. Longmire then coached the Sydney Swans to a premiership victory over Hawthorn in the 2012 AFL Grand Final by a margin of 10 points with the final score being the Sydney Swans 14.7 (91) to Hawthorn 11.15 (81). Subsequently, his contract was extended until the end of the 2015 season.

In March 2014, Longmire signed a two-year contract extension which took his tenure to the end of the 2017 AFL season.

In the 2014 season, Longmire coached the Sydney Swans to the 2014 AFL Grand Final, but they lost to Hawthorn by a margin of 63 points with the final score being Sydney Swans 11.8 (74) to Hawthorn 21.11 (137).

In the 2016 season, Longmire coached the Sydney Swans to the 2016 AFL Grand Final, but they lost to the Western Bulldogs by a margin of 22 points with the final score being Western Bulldogs 13.11 (89) to Sydney Swans 10.7 (67).

In round 4 of the 2019 AFL season, Longmire coached his 200th game, a career milestone. Three rounds later, he overtook Paul Roos as the longest serving coach of the club.

On 12 July 2019, Longmire extended his contract for a further three years, to remain the Sydney Swans' senior coach until at least the end of 2023.

In 2020, Longmire coached the All-Stars team in a one-off 2020 State of Origin match which was played on 28 February 2020 at Docklands Stadium.

In the 2022 season, Longmire coached the Sydney Swans to the 2022 AFL Grand Final when they lost to Geelong by a margin of 81 points with Geelong scoring 20.13 (133) to the Sydney Swans 8.4 (52).

On 2 March 2023, it was announced that Longmire had signed a two-year extension contract to remain the Sydney Swans senior coach until at least the end of 2025.

In the 2024 season, Longmire coached the Sydney Swans to the 2024 AFL Grand Final, when they lost to Brisbane Lions by a margin of 60 points with Brisbane Lions scoring 18.12 (120) to the Sydney Swans 9.6 (60).

John Longmire was described as a "shattered man" after the grand final. Pundits noted his dejected state, calling him a "broken man." Longmire was visibly emotional, with tears welling in his eyes, even as other team members were discussing game strategy.

The defeat marked the fourth successive grand final loss for Longmire. This was then compounded by having to conduct his post-match press conference while the victorious Brisbane Lions were celebrating. Amidst uproarious revelry, Longmire struggled to hear the questions posed by journalists. His own remarks were crowded out by joyous singing and the popping of champagne corks. Such a thin wall separating the teams did little to ease Longmire's pain, and drew strong criticism from media.

The loss, coupled with other factors like playing an injured player, provoked harsh appraisals of Longmire from fans and media. These factors, alongside a falling out with captain Luke Parker, and the rise of lead assistant Dean Cox, led Longmire to make the decision to move on from the club in late 2024, stating he needed to "to step back from coaching to rest, reflect and regenerate".

Longmire's official resignation as Sydney Swans senior coach was lodged on 26 November 2024, with assistant coach Dean Cox taking over.

==== Allegations of missing recordings ====
Allegations that Longmire sought to destroy or bury grand final recordings from the Sydney coaches box have continued to dog him after exiting Sydney.

It emerged in June 2025 that an audio recording device from a microphone Longmire wore during the 2024 Grand Final was not returned to AFL officials as stipulated. Longmire is reported to have removed an SD card from the recording device. The microphone was recording audio for AFL Media's annual Sound The Alarm documentary. The long-running series utilises audio recordings from both teams' coach's box on Grand Final day.

Reporter Mitch Cleary stated that Longmire was paid a fee for agreeing to the arrangement. This was the case with all previous coaches since the series began in 2019. In the case of Longmire, however, the audio never made it back to the producers. This impasse continued despite repeated enquiries from league officials. Such intransigence has seen speculation Longmire could be barred, by the AFL executive, from any coaching return until the recordings are furnished. "Things were said in the box that he didn't want other ears to hear" said Cleary of Longmire. Journalist Caroline Wilson said that "halfway through the first quarter" Longmire had become "panicked" and begun lashing out at others.

Nick Riewoldt speculated the recordings could produce "reputational or brand damage" for Longmire. He went on to say that there were "some things said about players" that "people don't want to ever hear." According to Caroline Wilson, such public outrage and legal fallout could spell financial devastation for the embattled Longmire. Wilson suggested that Longmire's subsequent actions made perfect sense. She reasoned that "giving up the money" he was paid for allowing recording access, would be the "cheaper price" when compared to public disgrace.

Longmire himself later confirmed these reports, but said his actions were spurred only by desire to avoid the "tough listening."

"I've listened to all the grand finals I've been in" said Longmire, adding, "I intended to do the same with this one." But after this, his fourth straight loss on the biggest stage, Longmire sought a different approach. "I just didn't want to re-live it again" he admitted.

Longmire defended his reluctance, saying, "I'd done it before. I'd listened and tried to learn something out of those games before. I just didn't want to do it again."

When pressed on the AFL's legal ownership of the devices and recordings, the former Swans' coach reacted furiously. Longmire suggested that the AFL had no rights to their own recordings, contravening a contract he had signed. "My assumption was it was my IP" said Longmire, suggesting all attempts to acquire the audio would meet fierce opposition.

== Post-coaching career ==
Following Longmire's coaching career, he moved into a new role at the Swans titled Executive Director of Club Performance. In September 2026, he left the Swans to join the Essendon Bombers for another newly-created role, General Manager of Performance.

=== Mental health advocacy ===
In September 2024, Sydney Swans spokesperson Tom Chadwick expressed concern for Longmire's mental wellbeing. Chadwick pledged strong action, saying he would "work with the AFL to ensure coaches are looked after post grand final losses." Longmire has himself spoken at length on the issue, publicly detailing his own experiences with mental health. In a video message to supporters, Longmire stressed the need to "reframe the conversation about men's depression."

Longmire was the first AFL personality to feature in the Better Out Than In initiative. The partnership, between Beyond Blue and the Movember Foundation, sought increased awareness of men's mental health.

Longmire's early participation prompted a flood of stories from other AFL players and coaches. Like Longmire's, these video accounts were released publicly, on the Better Out Than In website. Longmire's video was said to "reframe the conversation" removing "stigma and secrecy" from the hitherto taboo subject.

Longmire has taken this advocacy directly to the AFL, strongly campaigning for more mental health professionals in competition. He advocates that teams be permitted to pay their own club psychologists outside of the club's soft cap. Longmire says the policy is vital, lest more players and coaches fall by the mental health wayside. The case of St Kilda great Danny Frawley was given as one such instance of preventable inaction.

== Statistics ==
=== Playing statistics ===
Legend
G	Goals	K	Kicks	D	Disposals	T	Tackles
B	Behinds	H	Handballs	M	Marks
#	Played in that season's premiership team	†	Led the league for the season

Led the league for the season only

Season	Team	No.	Games	Totals							Averages (per game)							Votes
Season	Team	No.	Games	G	B	K	H	D	M	T	G	B	K	H	D	M	T	Votes
1988	North Melbourne	43	11	21	12	70	24	94	56	2	1.9	1.1	6.4	2.2	8.5	5.1	0.2	0
1989	North Melbourne	35	16	9	12	99	41	140	31	10	0.6	0.8	6.2	2.6	8.8	1.9	0.6	0
1990	North Melbourne	35	22	98^{†}	60	230	61	291	139	10	4.5	2.7	10.5	2.8	13.2	6.3	0.5	9
1991	North Melbourne	35	21	91	54	199	61	260	128	12	4.4	2.6	9.5	2.9	12.4	6.1	0.6	8
1992	North Melbourne	35	20	64	37	164	50	214	90	10	3.2	1.9	8.2	2.5	10.7	4.5	0.5	0
1993	North Melbourne	35	20	75	29	151	59	210	81	9	3.8	1.5	7.6	3.0	10.5	4.1	0.5	4
1994	North Melbourne	35	23	78	46	170	86	256	120	13	3.4	2.9	7.4	3.7	11.1	5.2	0.6	8
1995	North Melbourne	35	22	58	32	157	78	235	94	10	2.6	1.5	7.1	3.5	10.7	4.3	0.5	0
1996	North Melbourne	35	0	—	—	—	—	—	—	—	—	—	—	—	—	—	—	—
1997	North Melbourne	35	25	10	11	196	104	300	96	33	0.4	0.4	7.8	4.2	12.0	3.8	1.3	3
1998	North Melbourne	35	10	7	4	50	35	85	28	4	0.7	0.4	5.0	3.5	8.5	2.8	0.4	1
1999^{#}	North Melbourne	35	10	0	1	53	38	91	24	8	0.0	0.1	5.7	3.8	9.9	2.4	0.8	0
Career			200	511	298	1539	637	2177	887	121	2.4	1.5	7.7	3.2	10.9	4.4	0.6	33

=== Coaching statistics ===
Updated to the end of the 2024 season.

Team	Year	Home and Away Season					Finals			
Team	Year	Won	Lost	Drew	Win %	Position	Won	Lost	Win %	Result
SYD	2011	12	9	1	.546	7th out of 17	1	1	.500	Lost to Hawthorn in Semi Final
SYD	2012	16	6	0	.727	3rd out of 18	3	0	1.000	Defeated Hawthorn in Grand Final
SYD	2013	15	6	1	.682	4th out of 18	1	2	.332	Lost to Fremantle in Preliminary Final
SYD	2014	17	5	0	.773	1st out of 18	2	1	.667	Lost to Hawthorn in Grand Final
SYD	2015	16	6	0	.727	4th out of 18	0	2	.000	Lost to North Melbourne in Semi Final
SYD	2016	17	5	0	.773	1st out of 18	2	2	.500	Lost to Western Bulldogs in Grand Final
SYD	2017	14	8	0	.636	6th out of 18	1	1	.500	Lost to Geelong in Semi Final
SYD	2018	14	8	0	.636	6th out of 18	0	1	.000	Lost to GWS in Elimination Final
SYD	2019	8	14	0	.364	15th out of 18	-	-	-	-
SYD	2020	5	12	0	.294	16th out of 18	-	-	-	-
SYD	2021	15	7	0	.682	6th out of 18	0	1	.000	Lost to GWS in Elimination Final
SYD	2022	16	6	0	.727	2nd out of 18	2	1	.667	Lost to Geelong in Grand Final
SYD	2023	12	10	1	.522	8th out of 18	0	1	.000	Lost to Carlton in Elimination Final
SYD	2024	17	6	0	.739	1st out of 18	2	1	.667	Lost to Brisbane in Grand Final
Total		194	108	3	.562		14	14	.500	

== Honours and achievements ==
=== Playing honours ===
Team

- VFL/AFL Premiership (Kangaroos): 1999
- McClelland Trophy (North Melbourne): 1998
- Pre-Season Cup (North Melbourne): 1998

Individual

- Coleman Medal: 1990
- Syd Barker Medal (North Melbourne F.C. B&F): 1990
- North Melbourne F.C. Leading Goalkicker: 1990–1994

=== Coaching honours ===
Team

- AFL Premiership (Sydney): 2012
- Minor Premiership (Sydney): 2014, 2016, 2024
- Grand Finalist (Sydney): 2014, 2016, 2022, 2024

Individual

- Jock McHale Medal: 2012
- All-Australian: 2012

Sporting positions
Preceded by Paul Roos (Australian rules footballer)	Coach of the Sydney Swans; 2011–2024	Succeeded by Dean Cox
