= Alby Dunn =

Australian rules footballer

Personal information
- Full name: Albert John Dunn
- Born: 27 November 1941
- Died: 21 August 2009 (aged 67); Benowa, Queensland
- Original team: South Melbourne Districts
- Height: 170 cm (5 ft 7 in)
- Weight: 64 kg (141 lb)

Playing career^{1}
Years	Club	Games (Goals)
1960–62, 1966	South Melbourne	31 (12)
- ^{1} Playing statistics correct to the end of 1966.

Albert John Dunn (27 November 1941 – 21 August 2009) was an Australian rules footballer who played for South Melbourne in the Victorian Football League (VFL) during the 1960s.

Dunn was a local player at South Melbourne Districts when recruited into the South Melbourne team.

After sporadic appearances in the seniors over three seasons, Dunn went and played with Corowa and won the Ovens and Murray Football League's best and fairest award, the Morris Medal in 1965, before returning to South Melbourne to play in 1966.

He finished his career at Launceston and took home the Hec Smith Memorial Medal in 1968, as the 'best and fairest' player in the Northern Tasmanian Football Association. The following season, Dunn represented Tasmania in the Adelaide Carnival.
