= Esava Ratugolea =

Australian rules footballer

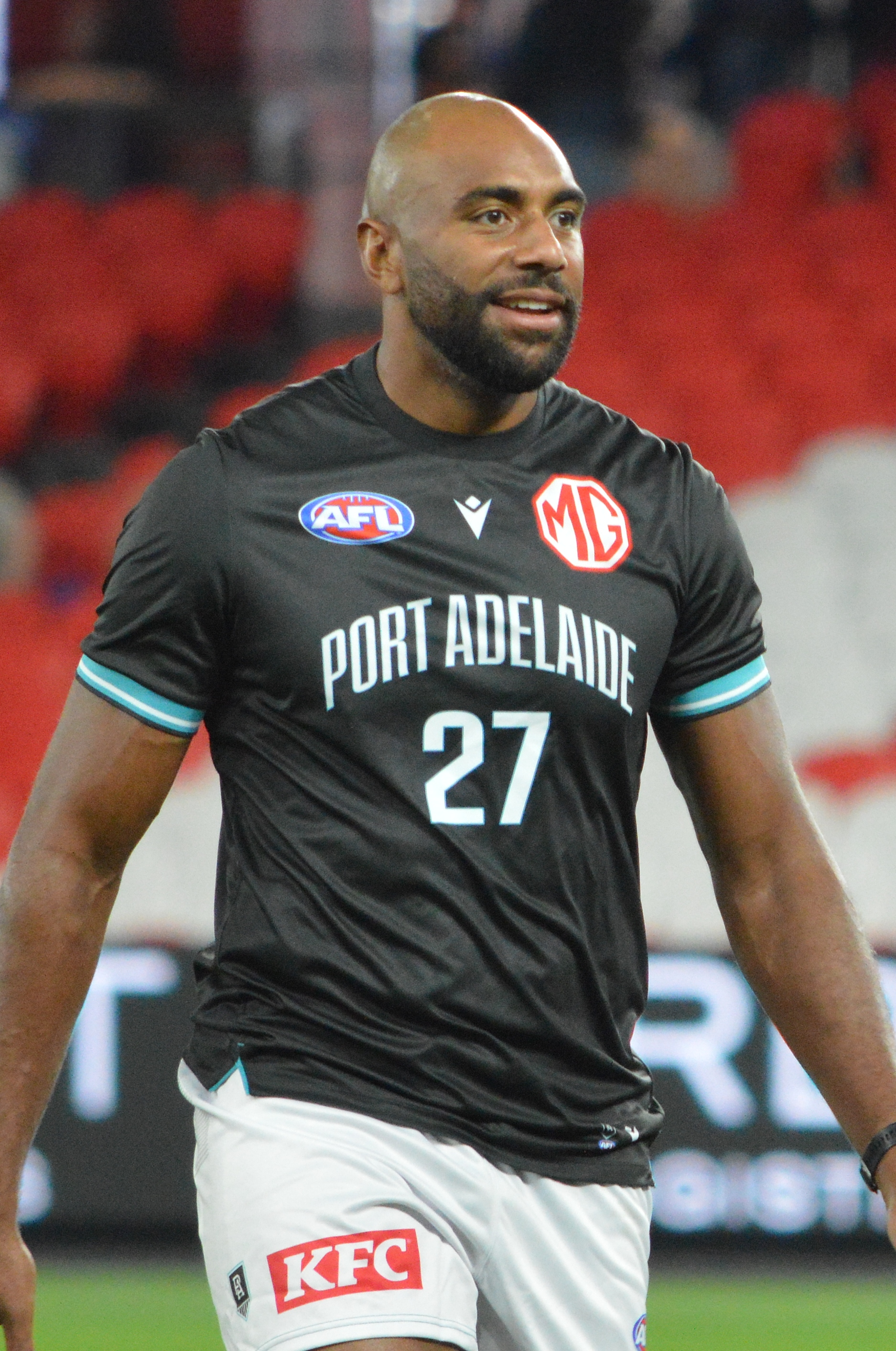
- Ratugolea with Port Adelaide in March 2026

Personal information
- Born: 24 July 1998 (age 28); Griffith, New South Wales
- Original teams: Cobram, Murray Bushrangers (TAC Cup)
- Draft: No. 43, 2016 national draft
- Debut: Round 1, 2018, Geelong vs. Melbourne, at MCG
- Height: 197 cm (6 ft 6 in)
- Weight: 102 kg (225 lb)
- Position: Key Defender

Club information
- Current club: Port Adelaide
- Number: 27

Playing career^{1}
| Years | Club | Games (Goals) |
| 2018–2023 | Geelong | 75 (38) |
| 2024– | Port Adelaide | 44 (4) |
| Total | | 119 (42) |
- ^{1} Playing statistics correct to the end of 2026.

Esava Ratugolea (born 24 July 1998) is a professional Australian rules footballer playing for the Port Adelaide Football Club in the Australian Football League (AFL). Ratugolea was initially drafted by Geelong with their third pick and forty-third overall in the 2016 national draft. Ratugolea made his debut in Geelong's 3-point win against Melbourne in round 1, 2018 at the Melbourne Cricket Ground.

Ratugolea was born in Griffith, New South Wales. His parents are Fijian, and arrived in Australia a few years before his birth. At the age of six, Ratugolea moved to Cobram, Victoria. He only began playing football in 2011, after previously playing rugby and soccer.

At the end of the 2023 AFL season, he was traded to Port Adelaide.

== Statistics ==
Updated to the end of round 22, 2026.

Legend
| G | Goals | K | Kicks | D | Disposals | T | Tackles |
| B | Behinds | H | Handballs | M | Marks | H/O | Hit-outs |

| Season | Team | No. | Games | Totals | | | | | | | | Averages (per game) | | | | | | | | Votes |
| Season | Team | No. | Games | G | B | K | H | D | M | T | H/O | G | B | K | H | D | M | T | H/O | Votes |
|---|---|---|---|---|---|---|---|---|---|---|---|---|---|---|---|---|---|---|---|---|
| 2018 | Geelong | 17 | 8 | 7 | 7 | 37 | 32 | 69 | 26 | 15 | 62 | 0.9 | 0.9 | 4.6 | 4.0 | 8.6 | 3.3 | 1.9 | 7.8 | 0 |
| 2019 | Geelong | 17 | 20 | 15 | 15 | 103 | 72 | 175 | 53 | 46 | 126 | 0.8 | 0.8 | 5.2 | 3.6 | 8.8 | 2.7 | 2.3 | 6.3 | 0 |
| 2020 (Note: The 2020 season was played with 17 home-and-away matches per team (down from 22) and 16-minute quarters with time on (down from 20-minute quarters with time on) due to the impact of the COVID-19 pandemic.) | Geelong | 17 | 12 | 5 | 5 | 60 | 44 | 104 | 32 | 30 | 72 | 0.4 | 0.4 | 5.0 | 3.7 | 8.7 | 2.7 | 2.5 | 6.0 | 0 |
| 2021 | Geelong | 17 | 15 | 11 | 5 | 63 | 52 | 115 | 32 | 30 | 93 | 0.7 | 0.3 | 4.2 | 3.5 | 7.7 | 2.1 | 2.0 | 6.2 | 0 |
| 2022 | Geelong | 17 | 4 | 0 | 0 | 17 | 9 | 26 | 9 | 8 | 13 | 0.0 | 0.0 | 4.3 | 2.3 | 6.5 | 2.3 | 2.0 | 3.3 | 0 |
| 2023 | Geelong | 17 | 16 | 0 | 0 | 93 | 49 | 142 | 70 | 22 | 2 | 0.0 | 0.0 | 5.8 | 3.1 | 8.9 | 4.4 | 1.4 | 0.1 | 0 |
| 2024 | Port Adelaide | 27 | 23 | 4 | 7 | 140 | 80 | 220 | 107 | 47 | 4 | 0.2 | 0.3 | 6.1 | 3.5 | 9.6 | 4.7 | 2.0 | 0.2 | 0 |
| 2025 | Port Adelaide | 27 | 13 | 0 | 0 | 86 | 56 | 142 | 75 | 21 | 3 | 0.0 | 0.0 | 6.6 | 4.3 | 10.9 | 5.8 | 1.6 | 0.2 | 1 |
| 2026 | Port Adelaide | 27 | 8 | 0 | 0 | 58 | 28 | 86 | 43 | 10 | 0 | 0.0 | 0.0 | 7.3 | 3.5 | 10.8 | 5.4 | 1.3 | 0.0 | 0 |
| Career | | | 119 | 42 | 39 | 657 | 422 | 1079 | 447 | 229 | 375 | 0.4 | 0.3 | 5.5 | 3.5 | 9.1 | 3.8 | 1.9 | 3.2 | 1 |

== Honours and achievements ==
Team

- 2× McClelland Trophy (Geelong): 2019, 2022

Individual

- Geelong F.C. Community Champion Award: 2021
