= Tommy Lahiff =

Australian rules footballer

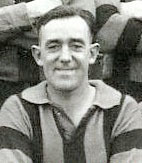

Personal information
- Full name: Thomas Lahiff
- Born: 31 July 1910
- Died: 8 December 1996 (aged 86)
- Original team: Port Melbourne (VFA)
- Debut: Round 1, 1935, Essendon vs. Melbourne, at MCG
- Height: 168 cm (5 ft 6 in)
- Weight: 68 kg (150 lb)
- Position: Rover

Playing career^{1}
Years	Club	Games (Goals)
1935–1937	Essendon	49 (67)
1942	South Melbourne	6 (10)
1942–1944	Hawthorn	19 (23)
Total		74 (100)

Coaching career
Years	Club	Games (W–L–D)
1935	Port Melbourne	
1937–1938	Port Melbourne	
1941	Port Melbourne	
1945–1946	Hawthorn	18 (2–15–1)
1965	South Melbourne	1 (0–1–0)
1947	Albury	
1951–1952	Corowa	
1954	Sandringham	
1962	Port Melbourne	
Total		19 (2–16–1)
- ^{1} Playing statistics correct to the end of 1944.

Career highlights
- 1941 – VFA Premiership captain/coach, Port Melbourne; 1947 – O&MFL Premiership captain/coach, Albury; 1934 & 1940 – Port Melbourne Best & Fairest

Thomas 'Tommy' 'Turk' Lahiff (31 July 1910 – 8 December 1996) was an Australian rules footballer who played with Essendon, South Melbourne and Hawthorn in the Victorian Football League (VFL) and for Port Melbourne in the Victorian Football Association (VFA), before becoming a successful coach and radio commentator.

Lahiff, a small rover who could play forward, started his career at Brighton before moving to Port Melbourne. He finished second in the Recorder Cup voting in 1931. He was recruited to Essendon in 1935 and kicked 32 goals in his debut season. In 1938 he returned to Port Melbourne and captain-coached them to the 1941 VFA premiership.

The VFA competition was suspended during the war so Lahiff had another spell in the VFL, joining South Melbourne. He had a memorable debut match for his new club when he kicked five goals, against Collingwood at Princes Park. His teammate Lindsay White, also making his debut with his second club, kicked seven. After just six games he crossed to Hawthorn mid season and in 1944 was appointed coach of the Hawks for the year but could only register two wins.

The rover finished up at Port Melbourne as a player in 1945, having played 178 games from his VFA debut in 1930. He had won 'Best and fairests' in 1934 and 1940. Lahiff coached Port Melbourne in 1946. In 2003 he was named as a forward pocket in Port Melbourne's official 'Team of the Century'.

In 1947, Lahiff was appointed as captain / coach of the Albury Football Club in the Ovens and Murray Football League (O&MFL). Albury won the O&MFL premiership under Lahiff in 1947.

In 1949, Lahiff played in the South – Port Football Association for the Rising Star Football Club.

In 1950, Lahiff played in the Saturday Morning Football League and was captain of the Postals Football Club.

In 1951 and 1952 Lahiff was captain / coach of the Corowa Football Club in the O&MFL. Lahiff was still playing well enough to represent the O&MFL in 1952 against the South West Football League (New South Wales) in Leeton, NSW.

Lahiff coached Sandringham Football Club in the Victorian Football Association 1954.

He continued to coach in the 1960s, firstly at Port Melbourne in 1962 and then as caretaker coach of South Melbourne during the 1965 VFL season.

Lahiff was also a cricketer, and at his peak he played 68 district First XI matches as a batsman for St Kilda between 1929/30 and 1935/36.

Lahiff also used to broadcast football games on radio. At 3KZ he teamed up again with Harry Beitzel to form a much–loved combination. "Are you there, Tommy?" Beitzel would ask, to which Lahiff would invariably reply from the dressing room: "Can you hear me, Harry?" First at 3KZ, then at 3AW, 3AK and finally 3WRB, their on air partnership lasted more than three decades.

Lahiff died in 1996. His funeral was held at the North Port Oval.

In 1999, author Ken Linnett released a book, Game for Anything: The Tommy Lahiff Story.
