= Aubrey MacKenzie =

Australian rules footballer

Personal information
- Full name: Aubrey Duckworth MacKenzie
- Born: 23 October 1894; Durban, South Africa
- Died: 15 July 1933 (aged 38) near Broadford, Victoria
- Original team: Brunswick Juniors

Playing career^{1}
Years	Club	Games (Goals)
1914	Melbourne	2 (0)
1922–1924	St Kilda	35 (8)
Total		37 (8)
- ^{1} Playing statistics correct to the end of 1924.

Aubrey Duckworth MacKenzie (23 October 1894 – 15 July 1933) was an Australian rules footballer who played with Melbourne and St Kilda in the Victorian Football League (VFL).

A Brunswick junior, MacKenzie appeared twice for Melbourne in the 1914 VFL season before enlisting in the armed forces and serving during the war.

MacKenzie was a member of Footscray's 1919 and 1920 Victorian Football Association premiership sides when he returned from the war and signed with St Kilda for the 1922 season. The South African born ruckman spent three years with St Kilda and helped turn a struggling outfit into a winning team.

In 1931, McKenzie was elected as President of the Corowa Football Club in the Ovens and Murray Football League. He also acted as their football coach in 1931, as a volunteer, receiving no remuneration.

MacKenzie died on 15 July 1933, when he was beheaded in a motor vehicle accident near Broadford, Victoria.

He was survived by his wife, Lillian, and his two children, Audrey and Maxie.
