= Rod Coutts (footballer) =

Australian rules footballer

Personal information
- Full name: Rod Coutts
- Born: 10 July 1942
- Original team: Kaniva
- Height: 192 cm (6 ft 4 in)
- Weight: 92 kg (203 lb)

Playing career^{1}
Years	Club	Games (Goals)
1963–64	Footscray	16 (22)
- ^{1} Playing statistics correct to the end of 1964.

Career highlights
- Kaniva Premierships: 1960, 61, 63, 65, 70; Nhill Premiership: 1969; Wimmera FL best & fairest, Toohey Medal: 1969

Rod Coutts (born 10 July 1942) is a former Australian rules footballer who played with Footscray in the Victorian Football League (VFL).

Coutts played in five premiership teams with Kaniva and one with Nhill and also won the 1969 Wimmera FL best & fairest award, the Toohey Medal.
