= Billy King (Australian footballer) =

Australian rules footballer

Personal information
- Full name: William Herbert King
- Born: 17 August 1920; Gisborne, Victoria
- Died: 23 August 1990 (aged 70)
- Original team: Ascot Vale
- Height: 178 cm (5 ft 10 in)
- Weight: 76 kg (168 lb)
- Position: Wingman

Playing career^{1}
Years	Club	Games (Goals)
1940–48	South Melbourne	136 (17)
- ^{1} Playing statistics correct to the end of 1948.

William Herbert King (17 August 1920 – 23 August 1990) was an Australian rules footballer who played for South Melbourne in the VFL during the 1940s. King, who started his career at South Melbourne in 1940, was recruited from Ascot Vale.

Primarily a wingman, he participated in the famous 1945 'Bloodbath' Grand Final which South Melbourne lost to Carlton. In 1947 he represented Victoria at the Hobart Carnival and was selected in the Sporting Life Team of the Year.

King was runner up to Bill Williams in South Melbourne's 1946 best and fairest award.

King was captain / coach of the Corowa Football Club in the Ovens and Murray Football League in 1949 and 1950.

King played in the New South Wales state team against Western Australia at the Sydney Cricket Ground in June, 1949.

King also played for New South Wales against Victoria in July, 1949, at the Sydney Cricket Ground.

After two years at Corowa, King accepted the role of captain / coach at North Albury Football Club in the Ovens and Murray Football League from 1951 to 1953. King was runner up in the 1952 Morris Medal with 19 votes, won by Wodonga's, Norm Webb on 22 votes.

King also represented the Ovens and Murray Football League on numerous occasions during his five years as coach of Corowa and North Albury.

In 1954, King was captain / coach of the Howlong Football Club when they won the Hume Football League premiership, undefeated.

In 1956, King won the Hume Football League best and fairest award, the Azzi Medal for Howlong with 21 votes.

== Links ==
- Billy King's playing statistics from AFL Tables
- 1947 Victorian Football side
- 1947 - South Melbourne FC team photo
- 1951 - Billy King photo
