= Fred Johnson (Australian footballer) =

Australian rules footballer (1896–1956)

Personal information
- Full name: Frederick George Johnson
- Born: 24 April 1896; Brunswick, Victoria
- Died: 24 December 1956 (aged 60); Coburg, Victoria
- Original team: Tramways
- Height: 174 cm (5 ft 9 in)
- Weight: 74 kg (163 lb)

Playing career^{1}
Years	Club	Games (Goals)
1918–22, 1924	Carlton	77 (0)
- ^{1} Playing statistics correct to the end of 1924.

Frederick George Johnson (24 April 1896 – 24 December 1956) was an Australian rules footballer who played with Carlton in the Victorian Football League (VFL).

Johnson coached the Corowa Football Club in the Ovens and Murray Football League in 1925. He also "coached" Ringwood Football Club during the 1925 Coreen & District Football League final series.
