= Len Johnson (footballer) =

Australian rules footballer (1908–42)

Personal information
- Full name: Leslie Albert Johnson
- Born: 6 July 1908; Elsternwick, Victoria
- Died: 24 January 1942 (aged 33) near Singapore, British Malaya
- Original team: Ascot Vale CYMS (CYMSFA)
- Position: Full-forward

Playing career^{1}
Years	Club	Games (Goals)
1929–1933	Essendon	64 (85)
1933	North Melbourne	5 (3)
1934	Longford	? (?)
1935	Griffith	? (?)
1936-37	Nhill FC	? (?)
Total		69 (88)
- ^{1} Playing statistics correct to the end of 1933.

Leslie Albert "Len" Johnson (6 July 1908 – 24 January 1942) was an Australian rules footballer who played with Essendon and North Melbourne in the Victorian Football League (VFL). He died in an accident while serving with the Second AIF during World War II.

== Family ==
One of the eight children of Albert Henry Johnson, and Margaret Johnson, née O'Keefe, Leslie Albert Johnson was born in Elsternwick, Victoria on 6 July 1908 (his birth was registered as "Albert Lesley Johnson").

His mother died on 26 June 1918, aged 40, when Len was only 10. His father, a handyman who had to travel widely for his work, leaving his youngest son in the hands of his daughters, and assuming that his eldest son, Dan (known as Edward), could look after himself, and delivered his three other sons, Len, Eric, and Patrick over to the Society of Saint Vincent de Paul's Boys Orphanage in Cecil Street, South Melbourne.

== Football ==
He was equal leading goalkicker for Essendon in the 1929 VFL season, and in one game kicked nine goals. He then played and coached in Tasmania, including at the Longford, Griffith and Nhill.

== Military service ==
Johnson enlisted in the Second AIF in March 1941 and was posted to British Malaya as a private in 4 Reserve Motor Transport Company.

== Death ==
He died in an accident on 24 January 1942 near Singapore. On that day, Johnson's sergeant ordered 4 Reserve Motor Transport Company to demolish a warehouse. The sergeant knocked down a wall, not knowing that Johnson was behind it and killing Johnson in the process.

The location of his grave was lost when the Japanese Empire occupied Singapore three weeks after Johnson's death.

His death is commemorated at the Singapore War Memorial, Kranji.

== See also ==
- List of Victorian Football League players who died on active service
