= Keith Williams (Australian footballer) =

Australian rules footballer

Personal information
- Full name: Keith Williams
- Born: 27 May 1926
- Died: 19 October 2004 (aged 78)
- Original team: Border United
- Height: 187 cm (6 ft 2 in)
- Weight: 93 kg (205 lb)

Playing career^{1}
Years	Club	Games (Goals)
1948	Fitzroy	18 (12)
- ^{1} Playing statistics correct to the end of 1948.

Keith Williams (27 May 1926 – 19 October 2004) was an Australian rules footballer who played with Fitzroy in the Victorian Football League (VFL).

Williams originally played for the Rutherglen Football Club in the Murray Valley Patriotic Football League in 1944 and then played for the Border United Football Club and tied for the club Best & Fairest award in 1945.

Williams continued to play for the Border United FC when they entered the Ovens & Murray Football League (O&MFL) in 1946.

Williams was signed by Fitzroy in 1947, the year he won the Ovens & Murray Football League (O&MFL) Morris Medal with the Border United Football Club (Corowa).

He joined Fitzroy in 1948 and the follower was a regular member of the team that year, playing 18 consecutive games, missing only the final round.

He returned to the O&MFL in 1949 as a playing coach of Rutherglen and coached them from 1949 to 1951. Essendon's Greg Tate took over from Williams in 1952 as coach of Rutherglen.

In 1952 he considered resuming his VFL career at Fitzroy but never made the move to Melbourne due to farming / business commitments. Williams played in Rutherglen's losing 1952 O&MFL grand final side.

In 1953, Williams was captain / coach of the Corowa Football Club seniors and continued to play for Corowa until the late 1950s.

His grandson is John Longmire, former North Melbourne full-forward and Sydney Swans senior coach.

== Links ==
- 1950 - Photo of Keith Williams
- 1953 - Corowa FC team photo
