= Bruce Dodson =

Australian rules footballer

Personal information
- Full name: Bruce Dodson
- Born: 12 May 1949 (age 77)
- Original team: Leeor
- Height: 187 cm (6 ft 2 in)
- Weight: 76 kg (168 lb)
- Position: Half-forward

Playing career^{1}
Years	Club	Games (Goals)
1971	Essendon	11 (3)
- ^{1} Playing statistics correct to the end of 1971.

Bruce Dodson (born 12 May 1949) is a former Australian rules footballer who played with Essendon in the Victorian Football League (VFL). He later returned to Leeor, where he had been recruited from, as captain-coach and also spent two season captain-coaching Nhill in 1977 and 1978.
