= Wilf Dickeson =

Australian rules footballer

Personal information
- Full name: Wilfred Albert Dickeson
- Born: 18 August 1943
- Original team: Nhill
- Height: 177 cm (5 ft 10 in)
- Weight: 73 kg (161 lb)
- Position: Back Pocket

Playing career^{1}
Years	Club	Games (Goals)
1965–66	Richmond	23 (0)
- ^{1} Playing statistics correct to the end of 1966.

Wilfred Albert Dickeson (born 18 August 1943) is a former Australian rules footballer who played with Richmond in the Victorian Football League (VFL).
