= Robert Longmire =

Australian rules footballer

Personal information
- Full name: Robert Longmire
- Born: 26 November 1944
- Original team: Corowa
- Height: 178 cm (5 ft 10 in)
- Weight: 76 kg (168 lb)

Playing career^{1}
Years	Club	Games (Goals)
1964	Collingwood	2 (0)
- ^{1} Playing statistics correct to the end of 1964.

Robert Longmire (born 26 November 1944) is a former Australian rules footballer who played with Collingwood in the Victorian Football League (VFL).

Longmire is the uncle of former North Melbourne Football Club player John Longmire.
