= Stan Wright (Australian rules footballer) =

Australian rules footballer (1918–1992)

Personal information
- Born: 7 March 1918
- Died: 6 January 1992 (aged 73)
- Original team: Redbank
- Height: 183 cm (6 ft 0 in)
- Weight: 92 kg (203 lb)

Playing career^{1}
Years	Club	Games (Goals)
1940–1946	Fitzroy	81 (37)
- ^{1} Playing statistics correct to the end of 1946.

Stan Wright (7 March 1918 – 6 January 1992) was an Australian rules footballer who played with Fitzroy in the Victorian Football League (VFL) during the 1940s.

He was the centre half forward in Fitzroy's 1944 VFL Grand Final win over Richmond, kicking one goal.

In 1947, Wright coached the Border United Football Club (Corowa) in Ovens and Murray Football League.

Wright injured his knee in round one, 1947 against Rutherglen Football Club, missed four weeks, then returned against Yarrawonga Football Club in round six, but came off the ground before half time. He resigned as coach the next week due to his serious knee injury.
