= Bert Smedley =

Australian rules footballer, born 1905

Personal information
- Full name: Ernest Edward Smedley
- Born: 1 April 1905; Richmond, Victoria
- Died: 30 November 1979 (aged 74); St Kilda, Victoria
- Original team: Castlemaine
- Position: Forward

Playing career^{1}
Years	Club	Games (Goals)
1928–29	St Kilda	19 (55)
1929,1931	Prahran (VFA)	
1930	Corowa (OMFL)	
- ^{1} Playing statistics correct to the end of 1931.

Ernest Edward "Bert" Smedley (1 April 1905 – 30 November 1979) was an Australian rules footballer who played for St Kilda in the Victorian Football League (VFL) during the late 1920s.

Recruited from the Castlemaine in the Bendigo Football League where he won the 1927 goalkicking award with 79 goals.

Smedley debuted in the 1928 VFL season and finished the year with exactly 50 goals, a tally which included six goal haul in just his second VFL game and a high of eight goals which he kicked in a win over North Melbourne at Arden Street.

The Castlemaine recruit was involved in a controversial incident in St Kilda's round 17 encounter with Melbourne. In the dying seconds, a pass from Horrie Mason had found Smedley, who played on and was running into an open goals when the bell rang. The umpire however had failed to hear it and only after Smedley had kicked the goal, which put his team one point up, did the game end. Melbourne unsuccessfully appealed the result but the win wasn't enough to put St Kilda into the finals as they missed out through percentage.

During the 1929 season Smedley transferred to Prahran and then, in 1930, Smedley was appointed as Captain / Coach of the Corowa Football Club in the Ovens and Murray Football League, before being cleared back to Prahran in April 1931.
