= Fred Nixon (Australian footballer) =

Australian rules footballer

Personal information
- Full name: Frederick Nixon
- Born: 26 September 1874; Wagga Wagga, New South Wales
- Died: 12 March 1933 (aged 58); Prahran, Victoria
- Original team: Corowa
- Position: Full forward

Playing career^{1}
Years	Club	Games (Goals)
1903–04	St Kilda	22 (21)
- ^{1} Playing statistics correct to the end of 1904.

Fred Nixon (26 September 1874 – 12 March 1933) was an Australian rules footballer who played with St Kilda in the Victorian Football League (VFL).

Nixon was recruited from the Corowa Football Club in the Ovens and Murray Football League.

Nixon returned to play with Corowa after his stint with St. Kilda.

In 1906 Nixon, the Corowa FC captain controversially leaves Corowa for financial reasons to go and play with Rutherglen Football Club.
