= Bill Byrne (footballer, born 1931) =

Australian rules footballer (1931–2020)

Personal information
- Full name: Cyril William Byrne
- Born: 15 May 1931
- Died: 4 September 2020 (aged 89)
- Original teams: Corowa, Mangoplah
- Height: 172 cm (5 ft 8 in)

Playing career^{1}
Years	Club	Games (Goals)
1957	Melbourne	1 (0)
- ^{1} Playing statistics correct to the end of 1957.

Cyril William Byrne (15 May 1931 – 4 September 2020) was an Australian rules footballer who played for the Melbourne Football Club in the Victorian Football League (VFL).

Byrne played with North Launceston from 1951 to 1953, winning their best and fairest in 1952.

Byrne trained with Essendon in early 1953.

He was recruited to Captain / Coach Corowa in 1954 and 1955.

Byrne was then Captain / Coach of Mangoplah - Cookardinia from 1956 to 1959, for two premierships in 1956 and 1957.

In Rd.1 of 1957, Byrne played his one and only game with the Melbourne Football Club, then returned to Mangoplah.

Byrne coached Leeton in the South West Football League (New South Wales) in 1960, Byrne then coached East Devonport in 1961 and 1962, then coached Pennant Hill in Sydney in 1972.
