= Rupert Gibb =

Australian rules footballer

Personal information
- Full name: Rupert Gibb
- Born: 25 August 1900
- Died: 4 July 1978 (aged 77)
- Original team: Vermont
- Height: 183 cm (6 ft 0 in)
- Weight: 83 kg (183 lb)

Playing career^{1}
Years	Club	Games (Goals)
1922	Richmond	4 (0)
1925	Footscray	12 (8)
Total		16 (8)
- ^{1} Playing statistics correct to the end of 1925.

Rupert Gibb (25 August 1900 – 4 July 1978) was a former Australian rules footballer who played with Richmond and Footscray in the Victorian Football League (VFL).

Gibb was a well-performed professional sprinter, having won the Warrnambool Gift and the 1925 Warracknabeal Gift. Gibb was a finalist in the 1926 Stawell Gift, finishing 5th off 8 1/4yds.

In 1937, Gibb was appointed as coach of Corowa Football Club in the Ovens and Murray Football League.

== Sources ==
- Watt, Gary (2008). The Stawell Gift Almanac: History of the Stawell Gift (1st ed.). Melbourne, Victoria: Legacy Books. ISBN 978-0-9802897-4-9.
