= Dinny Dowd =

Australian rules footballer, born 1906

Personal information
- Full name: Denis Austin Dowd
- Born: 1 January 1906; Fremantle, Western Australia
- Died: 1 November 1963 (aged 57); Ballarat, Victoria
- Original teams: Nhill, Nar Nar Goon

Playing career^{1}
| Years | Club | Games (Goals) |
| 1931 | Fitzroy | 15 (1) |
| 1932 | South Melbourne | 2 (0) |
| 1932 | North Melbourne | 2 (0) |
| Total | | 19 (1) |
- ^{1} Playing statistics correct to the end of 1932.

Denis Austin Dowd (1 January 1906 – 1 November 1963) was an Australian rules footballer who played with Fitzroy, South Melbourne and North Melbourne in the Victorian Football League (VFL).

Dowd played with a number of club's across Victoria including - Iona, Ballarat, Nhill and Nar Nar Goon prior to playing with Fitzroy.

Dowd was recruited to Fitzroy after being best on ground for Nar Nar Goon in the 1930 Central Gippsland Football League grand final.

Dowd won the 1934 Central Gippsland FL best and fairest award.

He later became President of the Corowa Football Club in the Ovens & Murray Football League in 1951.
