= Don Taylor (footballer) =

Australian rules footballer & coach (1920–1994)

Personal information
- Full name: Albert Dominic Taylor
- Born: 24 June 1920; Largs Bay, South Australia
- Died: 15 January 1994 (aged 73)
- Height: 183 cm (6 ft 0 in)
- Weight: 80 kg (176 lb)
- Position: Half back

Playing career^{1}
Years	Club	Games (Goals)
1939–41, 1945–46, 1949	West Adelaide	58 (50)
1942, 1947–48	South Melbourne	36 (38)
1950–54	Glenelg	77 (26)

Coaching career
Years	Club	Games (W–L–D)
1965	West Adelaide	20 (4–16–0)
- ^{1} Playing statistics correct to the end of 1954.

Albert Dominic "Don" Taylor (24 June 1920 – 15 January 1994) was an Australian rules footballer who played for South Melbourne in the Victorian Football League (VFL). He also played with West Adelaide and Glenelg in the South Australian National Football League (SANFL).

The son of John Taylor Sr., who played 56 games for SANFL club Port Adelaide from 1915 to 1923, Taylor, along with his brothers John Jnr. and Laurie, began his career at West Adelaide and finished it at Glenelg. In between he had two separate stints with South Melbourne, the first while on war service in 1942 when he appeared in five VFL games, two of them finals, including their preliminary final loss to Essendon. He returned in 1947 and from mid season was used as a forward and on the ball, kicking at least two goals in each of his final six games. In one of those games, against Hawthorn at Glenferrie Oval, he kicked a career best bag of six goals.

As a result of his consistent performances up forward in 1947, Taylor remained there in 1948 and kicked five goals against Richmond in the opening round. He finished the year in defence, his preferred position while at West Adelaide, and in 1949 returned to South Australia and joined Glenelg.

Taylor won Glenelg's best and fairest award in both 1950 and 1952 before playing the last of his 135 SANFL games in 1954. He was recognised in the 1952 Sporting Life Team of the Year as a half back flanker and represented South Australia in nine interstate matches during his career.

His final contribution to South Australian football came in 1965 when he coached West Adelaide for the season. The club however struggled and finished the year in ninth position (of ten).

== Sources ==
- Atkinson, G. (1982) Everything you ever wanted to know about Australian rules football but couldn't be bothered asking, The Five Mile Press: Melbourne. ISBN 0 86788 009 0.
- Holmesby, Russell and Main, Jim (2007). The Encyclopedia of AFL Footballers. 7th ed. Melbourne: Bas Publishing.
