= Vic Carroll (Australian footballer) =

Australian rules footballer

Personal information
- Full name: Victor Lawrence Carroll
- Born: 30 April 1912; Malvern, Victoria
- Died: 18 October 1998 (aged 86); Corowa, New South Wales
- Original team: Corowa
- Height: 175 cm (5 ft 9 in)
- Weight: 77 kg (170 lb)
- Position: Centre

Playing career^{1}
Years	Club	Games (Goals)
1937	Fitzroy	12 (2)
- ^{1} Playing statistics correct to the end of 1937.

Victor Lawrence Carroll (30 April 1912 – 18 October 1998) was an Australian rules footballer who played 12 consecutive games with Fitzroy in 1937 in the Victorian Football League (VFL).

== Family ==
The son of Edward Martin Carroll (1883-1958), and Emily Sarah Carroll (1883-1967), née Bisset, Victor Lawrence Carroll was born at Malvern, Victoria on 30 April 1912.

He married Mary Agnes Ison (1918-1980) in 1937.

== Football ==
=== Melbourne (VFL) ===
Carroll and one of his two younger brothers, Norm — i.e., Norman Powlett Carroll (1910-1968) — had previously trained with the Melbourne Football Club in 1931.

=== Fitzroy (VFL) ===
Cleared to Fitzroy from Corowa on 26 May 1937, Carroll made his First XVIII debut against Geelong, at the Corio Oval, on 5 June 1937.

=== Corowa ===
Carroll was cleared back to the Corowa Football Club in the Ovens and Murray Football League in April, 1938.

== Military service ==
Carroll later served in the Australian Army for six months during World War II.
