= Nhill & District Sporting Club =

Nhill

Names
- Full name: Nhill & District Sporting Clubs Inc
- Nickname: Tigers

Club details
- Founded: 1883
- Colours: Navy Gold Cyan
- Competition: Wimmera Football League
- Premierships: (7) 1904, 1932, 1964, 1965, 1969, 1981, 2026
- Ground: Davis Park, Nhill

Other information
- Official website: Nhill FNC website

The Nhill and District Sporting Club Inc was formed in 2001 with the amalgamation of the Nhill and District Football Club and Nhill Cricket Club. In 2007 The Nhill Hockey Club joined the Nhill and District Sporting Club and in 2010 a soccer division was developed, which lasted for 12 months.

The Sporting club now comprises four sports; cricket, football, hockey and netball.

The club operates from Davis Park and maintains the oval, resulting in one of the best playing surfaces in Western Victoria. Hindmarsh Shire Council own the facilities at Davis Park, including the buildings and a new grandstand/clubrooms completed in 2026.

The football division competes in the Wimmera Football League (WFL). They are based in the township of Nhill, Victoria.

== Nhill Football Netball Club ==
The Nhill Football Club appears to have been established in 1883 and they initially wore red and white colours when competing in the President's Challenge Cup and combined with Dimboola FC for this competition.

In 1912, Loyal Lackmann kicked 95 goals for Nhill when they played in the Borung and Dunmuckle Shire Football Association.

In 1938, Nhill FC Reserves competed in Lowan Star Football League, with Jack Kay winning the club best and fairest.

In 2023 the NDSC B Grade netball team won the premiership in the Wimmera FNL. This was Nhill's first open age netball premiership in a number of decades.

In 2026 Nhill won the senior football premiership in the Wimmera FNL, ending a 45-year premiership drought.

== Football Premierships ==
Nhill FC have won the following senior football premiership - 1904, 1932, 1964, 1965, 1969, 1981 and 2026. The club has also been runners-up in - 1920, 1923, 1929, 1939, 1963 and 2010.

Seniors

- ? Football Association
  - 1904 - Nhill d Kaniva
- West Wimmera FL
  - 1932 - Nhill: 16.10 - 106 d Dimboola: 13.11 - 89
- Wimmera Football League
  - 1964 - Nhill: 7.8 - 50 drew Ararat: 6.14 - 50
  - 1964 - Nhill: 10.10 - 70 d Ararat: 9.14 - 68 (grand final replay)
  - 1965 - Nhill: 10.13 - 73 d Warracknabeal: 8.11 - 59
  - 1969 - Nhill: 15.10 - 100 d Stawell: 12.15 - 87
  - 1981 - Nhill: 15.12 - 102 d Horsham: 15.8 - 98
  - 2026 - Nhill: 19.9 - 123 d Ararat: 12.9 - 81

== League Best and Fairest Winners ==
Seniors

- Wimmera Football League - Toohey Medal
  - 1952, 1954, 1955 & 1960: Wes Warrick
  - 1964: Peter Patterson
  - 1969: Rod Coutts
  - 1988: Stephen Graham
  - 1990: Peter Simounds
  - 1997: Robert Broadhurst
  - 2017: Billy Hayes

Reserves

- Wimmera Football League
  - 1954 - Kevin Reichelt
  - 1981 - Jeff Fritsch
  - 1983 - Roger Chilton
  - 2004 - Kevin Jones
  - 2010 - Simon Mock
  - 2012 - Luke Oldaker

Thirds

- Wimmera Football League
  - 1967 - Ivan Menzel
  - 1969 - Jeff Fritsch
  - 1983 - Graeme Bye
  - 1986 - Glen Hall
  - 1992 - Brendan McCartney
  - 2000 - Ben Walters
  - 2008 - Ricky Scott
  - 2011 - Mitchell Dahlenburg

== VFL / AFL Players ==
The following footballers played with Nhill FNC, prior to playing senior football in the VFL/AFL, and / or drafted, with the year indicating their VFL/AFL debut.

- 1911 - Tom Strownix - South Melbourne
- 1922 - Alwin Dalitz - Fitzroy
- 1929 - Art Beaumont - Melbourne
- 1929 - Frank Gill - Carlton
- 1931 - Dinny Dowd - Fitzroy
- 1931 - Bill Roberts - Essendon
- 1940 - Leo Merrett - Richmond
- 1965 - Wilf Dickeson - Richmond
- 1965 - Peter Patterson – Collingwood
- 1986 - David Flood – Essendon
- 1987 - Dean Wallis – Essendon
- 1991 - Jason McCartney – Collingwood, Adelaide, North Melbourne

The following footballers played senior VFL / AFL football prior to playing and / or coaching with Nhill with the year indicating their first season at Nhill FNC.

- 1926 - Rex De Garis - St Kilda
- 1928 - Claude Toovey - Fitzroy
- 1929 - Jack Bisset - Richmond
- 1929 - Bill Twomey Senior - Collingwood
- 1938 - Len Murphy - Collingwood
- 1936 - Len Johnson - Essendon
- 1946 - Ralph Patman - Fitzroy
- 1956 - Dave Bryden - Footscray
- 1966 - Rod Coutts - Footscray
- 1977 - Bruce Dodson - Essendon
- 2009 - Daniel Hargraves - Footscray
- 2009 - Chris Ladhams - Adelaide

== Netball Premierships ==
A. Grade

- ?

B. Grade

- 2023,

C. Grade

- ?

C. Reserve

- ?

== Horsham Cricket Association ==
The NDSC's cricket sides participate in the Horsham Cricket Association. They currently field both an A Grade and C Grade. Nhill's A Grade won the premiership in 2023 and their C Grade played off in the Grand Final. Both cricket teams are based out of Davis Park.

== Wimmera Hockey Association ==
Nhill's hockey teams participate in the Wimmera Hockey Association, currently fielding all teams in juniors and seniors. The hockey plays out of Davis Park when the football/netball either have a bye or play away.

== Links ==
- 1904 - Nhill FC team photo
- 1926 - Nhill FC & Warracknabeal FC team photos
- 1926 - Wimmera FL 2nd Semi Final teams: Nhill FC & Stawell FC team photos
- 1926 - Nhill FC President & Secretary photo
- 1927 - Nhill FC & Horsham FC team photos
- 1928 - Nhill FC team photo
- 1929 - Nhill FC & Warracknabeal FC action photos
- 1929 - Stawell FC & Nhill FC action photos
- 1929 - Nhill FC team photo
- 1931 - Nhill FC best & Fairest: Norman Miller photo
- 1931 - Nhill FC & Ararat FC team photos
- 1936 - Nhill FC team photo
- 1941 - Private H C Pryor photo
- 1947 - Dimboola FC, Horsham FC, Minyip & Nhill FC team photos
- 1950 - Nhill FC team photo
- 1969 - Wimmera FL Premiers: Nhill FNC team photo
