= Frank Whitty =

Australian rules footballer, born 1905

Personal information
- Full name: Francis Harold Whitty
- Born: 26 April 1905; Corowa, New South Wales
- Died: 18 October 2001 (aged 96); Coburg, Victoria
- Original teams: Daysdale, Coreen, Corowa
- Height: 187 cm (6 ft 2 in)
- Weight: 84 kg (185 lb)

Playing career^{1}
Years	Club	Games (Goals)
1929–30	Hawthorn	11 (11)
- ^{1} Playing statistics correct to the end of 1930.

Francis Harold Whitty (26 April 1905 – 18 October 2001) was an Australian rules footballer who played with Hawthorn in the Victorian Football League (VFL).

A follower who was recruited from New South Wales, Whitty played eleven VFL games for Hawthorn before transferring to Camberwell in June 1930 and then moved on to Brighton in 1931.
