= Laurie Taylor (footballer, born 1918) =

Australian rules footballer (1918–1980)

Personal information
- Full name: Lawrence Taylor
- Born: 21 October 1918; Norwood, South Australia
- Died: 18 October 1980 (aged 61); Gosford, New South Wales
- Original team: West Adelaide
- Height: 188 cm (6 ft 2 in)
- Weight: 81.5 kg (180 lb)

Playing career^{1}
Years	Club	Games (Goals)
1944, 1947	Richmond	20 (48)
- ^{1} Playing statistics correct to the end of 1947.

Laurie Taylor (21 October 1918 – 18 October 1980) was an Australian rules footballer who played in the Victorian Football League (VFL) for the Richmond Football Club and in the South Australian National Football League (SANFL) for West Adelaide and Glenelg Football Clubs.

Taylor was 6'2", an inch taller than fellow Richmond ruckman Jack Dyer and was a well-built centre-half forward, renowned for his strong marking.

== War service ==
Taylor served with the 2nd AIF in Borneo during World War II.

== Shoulder dislocation ==
On 17 May 1947, in the first match that Taylor played after his discharge from the A.I.F., Richmond was playing Hawthorn and Taylor was playing in the ruck. At the first bounce, Taylor punched the ball an amazing 40 yd (37 m) and, at the same time, dislocated his shoulder.

== The Taylor football family ==
Laurie's record as a player and as a coach is impressive:

- 1936–1937, West Adelaide Juniors
- 1937–1941, 1946, West Adelaide 44 games (127 goals)
- 1944, West Adelaide/Genelg: 1 game (1 goal)
- South Australian Interstate Team: 5 games (7 goals)
- 1944, 1947, Richmond: 20 games (48 goals, including five 5-goal matches)
- 1948: Corowa, captain-coach. Also represented New South Wales in interstate football?
- 1949: Coolamon Football Club captain-coach. Represented NSW v Victoria.
- 1950, 1952, Glenelg: 28 games (60 goals)
- 1951, Coolamon, captain-coach.
- 1953–1954: Naracoorte, captain-coach, 1953 & 54 premiership coach.
- 1955–1956: West Gambier, Captain-coach

His family were also steeped in football.

- John Taylor Sr., his father, played 56 games with SANFL club Port Adelaide including their 1914 team which was unbeaten for the entire season.
- John Taylor Jr., his brother, played 258 games for SANFL clubs West Adelaide and Glenelg as both player and as captain-coach. He played for South Australia five times. He was the first SANFL player to play 250 games.
- Don Taylor, his other brother, played 20 senior games for South Melbourne in 1942 and 1947. On 30 August 1947, in round 19, South Melbourne played Richmond at the Punt Road Oval; Laurie Taylor was the Richmond full-forward, and Don Taylor was the South Melbourne full-forward. Laurie Taylor kicked 5 goals for Richmond, and was one of the best on the ground, whilst Don kicked two goals for South Melbourne. He also played 136 senior games for West Adelaide and Glenelg between 1939 and 1954. He played for South Australia nine times. He also coached West Adelaide in 1965.
