= Jim Sandral =

Australian rules footballer (1933–2024)

Personal information
- Full name: James Fardel Sandral
- Born: 19 February 1933
- Died: 14 July 2024 (aged 91); Corowa, New South Wales, Australia
- Original teams: Rennie, Corowa
- Height: 179 cm (5 ft 10 in)
- Weight: 85 kg (187 lb)

Playing career^{1}
Years	Club	Games (Goals)
1956–1957	Melbourne	22 (2)
- ^{1} Playing statistics correct to the end of 1957.

Career highlights
- Archie Dennis Medal: 1953 & 1954; Melbourne premiership player: 1956; Morris Medal: 1959, 1962, 1964; O&M Hall of Fame: 2005

James Fardel Sandral (19 February 1933 – 14 July 2024) was an Australian rules football player who played for Melbourne in the Victorian Football League (VFL).

Sandral, who didn't start playing football until the age of 16, commenced his football with Rennie Football Club and played in their 1952 and 1954 premiership teams and winning the club Best and Fairest award in 1952 and 1954. Sandral won the Coreen & District Football League – Best and Fairest award in 1953 and 1954. He was also runner up to his Rennie coach, Frank O'Leary in the 1952 Coreen & District Football League best and fairest award, the Archie Denis Memorial Trophy.

He went into the Ovens and Murray Football League and played with Corowa in 1955 and was signed up by the Melbourne Football Club after starring for the O&MFL in the 1955 Victorian Country Football Championships.

Sandral went onto play in Melbourne's 1956 VFL premiership team. Only a reserve in Melbourne's semi-final win, Sandral was given a starting spot for the 1956 VFL Grand Final, on a half forward flank, due to an injury suffered by Geoff McGivern in the semi-final. He played a total of 22 league games with Melbourne.

After leaving Melbourne, Sandral returned to Corowa in 1958 as captain and coach of Corowa in 1958 and 1959.

Sandral won the Ovens & Murray Football League's best and fairest award, the Morris Medal, three times. His first win was in 1959, the second of his two years as coach, then had further wins in 1962 and 1964.

Sandral also won Corowa's best and fairest award in 1960, 1961, 1962, 1963 and 1964.

Sandral then returned home to Rennie Football Club and coached them from 1965 to 1970, winning the club's best and fairest in 1970, plus winning the Coreen & District Football League premiership in 1970 in his last game of football. Sandral was also runner up in the Coreen & District Football League's Archie Denis Medal in 1966, 1967, 1968, 1969 and 1970.

He was inducted into the Ovens and Murray Football League's Hall of Fame in 2005. His son Denis played 348 senior games and won five best and fairest awards for Corowa Rutherglen Football Club was also inducted into the O&MFNL – Hall of Fame, in 2009. Sandral died on 14 July 2024, at the age of 91.
