= Frank Huggard =

Australian rules footballer

Personal information
- Full name: James Francis Huggard
- Born: 1 February 1894; Murchison, Victoria
- Died: 29 March 1965 (aged 71); Heidelberg, Victoria
- Original teams: Cobram, Tatura
- Height: 180 cm (5 ft 11 in)
- Weight: 83 kg (183 lb)

Playing career^{1}
Years	Club	Games (Goals)
1919–20, 1922–25	Richmond	33 (2)
- ^{1} Playing statistics correct to the end of 1925.

James Francis Huggard (1 February 1894 – 29 March 1965) was an Australian rules footballer who played with Richmond in the Victorian Football League (VFL).

In 1919, Huggard played in two losing grand finals teams. Firstly with Tatura in the Goulburn Valley Football League on Wednesday, 24th September, where he was judged best on ground and then he played in all of Richmond's finals, that were played on Saturday's, including their loss to Collingwood in the 1919 VFL grand final on Saturday 11th October 1919.

In September 1920, Huggard of Tatura was suspended by the Goulburn Valley Football League until the end of the 1921 season for striking and kicking A. Drinkwater from Shepparton in a match on Wednesday 1st September. Huggard was also playing for Richmond on the weekends and this suspension most likely cost him a spot in Richmond's 1920 VFL Grand Final victory.

In 1922, Huggard was captain-coach of the Rushworth Football Club in the Goulburn Valley Football League.

Huggard played in Shepparton's 1925 Goulburn Valley Football League's premiership team.

In 1926, Huggard was appointed as captain / coach of the Corowa Football Club in the Ovens and Murray Football League.

Older brother of Richmond player, Jack Huggard.

Huggard served in the Australian Army in World War One in the 13th Light Horse.
