= Art Beaumont =

Australian rules footballer, born 1904

Personal information
- Full name: Arthur Oliver Beaumont
- Born: 8 December 1904; Ipswich, Queensland
- Died: 8 February 1980 (aged 75); Kew, Victoria
- Original team: Nhill
- Height: 185 cm (6 ft 1 in)
- Weight: 95 kg (209 lb)

Playing career^{1}
| Years | Club | Games (Goals) |
| 1929 | Melbourne | 2 (0) |
| 1930 | Prahran (VFA) | 10 (3) |
- ^{1} Playing statistics correct to the end of 1930.

Arthur Oliver Beaumont (8 December 1904 – 8 February 1980) was an Australian rules footballer who played for the Melbourne Football Club in the Victorian Football League (VFL).
