= Rex De Garis =

Australian rules footballer

Personal information
- Full name: Rex De Garis
- Born: 29 December 1896; South Melbourne, Victoria
- Died: 14 June 1967 (aged 70); Ripponlea, Victoria
- Original team: Prahran
- Height: 175 cm (5 ft 9 in)
- Weight: 70 kg (154 lb)
- Position: Wing

Playing career^{1}
Years	Club	Games (Goals)
1921–23, 1925	St Kilda	60 (13)
1924	Corowa	
1926	Nhill	
1927	Rochester	
1928	Nhill	
1931	Sorrento	12 (unknown)
- ^{1} Playing statistics correct to the end of 1925.

Rex De Garis (29 December 1896 – 14 June 1967) was an Australian rules footballer who played with St Kilda in the Victorian Football League (VFL).

De Garis was appointed as playing coach of the Corowa Football Club who played in the Ovens and Murray Football League in 1924.

He was playing coach of Nhill Football Club in 1926, of Rochester Football Club in 1927, and of Sorrento Football Club in 1931.
