= Greg Nichols (footballer) =

Australian rules footballer

Personal information
- Full name: Gregory Nichols
- Born: 6 January 1959 (age 67)
- Original team: Cobram (MFL)
- Height: 190 cm (6 ft 3 in)
- Weight: 84 kg (185 lb)

Playing career^{1}
Years	Club	Games (Goals)
1979	Geelong	1 (0)
1984	Glenelg (SANFL)	17 (62)
- ^{1} Playing statistics correct to the end of 1979.

Greg Nichols (born 6 January 1959) is a former Australian rules footballer who played with Geelong in the Victorian Football League (VFL), and Glenelg in the South Australian National Football League (SANFL) in 1984. Nichols is now a director of Racing Victoria.
