= Peter Patterson (footballer, born 1945) =

Australian rules footballer and coach

Personal information
- Full name: Peter Patterson
- Born: 3 October 1945 (age 81)
- Original team: Nhill
- Height: 180 cm (5 ft 11 in)
- Weight: 71 kg (157 lb)

Playing career^{1}
Years	Club	Games (Goals)
1965–1970	Collingwood	58 (4)
- ^{1} Playing statistics correct to the end of 1970.

Career highlights
- 1964 - Wimmera FL best & fairest, Toohey Medal: Nhill FC

Peter Patterson (born 3 October 1945) is a former Australian rules footballer who played with Collingwood in the Victorian Football League (VFL).

Patterson started his career in the Wimmera Football League, where he played with Nhill. A wingman, he made his debut for Collingwood in 1965 and the following year played in the side which lost the grand final by a single point. He missed just one game in 1967 but would only add another 20 games in the next three seasons.

He was later the playing coach of Hampden Football League club South Warrnambool.
