= Greg Lambert (footballer) =

Australian rules footballer

Personal information
- Full name: Gregory Bruce Lambert
- Born: 1 March 1947 (age 79)
- Original team: Corowa
- Height: 178 cm (5 ft 10 in)
- Weight: 76 kg (168 lb)

Playing career^{1}
Years	Club	Games (Goals)
1966–1979	South Melbourne	167 (22)
- ^{1} Playing statistics correct to the end of 1979.

Gregory Bruce Lambert (born 1 March 1947) is a former Australian rules footballer who played with South Melbourne in the Victorian Football League (VFL).

Lambert came to South Melbourne from Corowa and initially represented Corowa FC juniors in the Hume Junior Football League.

He spent most of his career as a back pocket defender and wingman. He transferred to VFA club Dandenong after his stint in the VFL.

He captain-coached Mt Eliza to a premiership in 1983.

== Links ==
- 1972 South Melbourne FC team photo
