= Bill Roberts (footballer, born 1910) =

Australian rules footballer, born 1910

Personal information
- Full name: William Henry Roberts
- Born: 22 July 1910; Nhill, Victoria
- Died: 8 December 1973 (aged 63); Seville, Victoria
- Original team: Nhill

Playing career^{1}
Years	Club	Games (Goals)
1931, 1933	Essendon	12 (1)
- ^{1} Playing statistics correct to the end of 1933.

William Henry Roberts (22 July 1910 – 8 December 1973) was an Australian rules footballer who played with Essendon in the Victorian Football League (VFL).

== Family ==
The son of Charles George Roberts (1881–1961), and Ellen Louisa Roberts (1884–1972), née Harris, William Henry Roberts was born at Nhill, Victoria on 22 July 1910.

He married Gwen Molloy (1919-2004) in 1937.

== Football ==
Recruited from the Nhill Football Club in 1931.

=== Essendon (VFL) ===
He played for the First XVIII in six consecutive home-and-away games in 1931, and in 3 consecutive home-and-away games in 1933.

=== Horsham (WFL) ===
In 1946 he was appointed non-playing coach of the Horsham Football Club in the Wimmera Football League.

== Military service ==
Roberts served in the Royal Australian Air Force during World War II.

== Death ==
He died at Seville, Victoria on 8 December 1973.
