= Rennie Football Club =

Rennie

Names
- Full name: Rennie Football Netball Club
- Nickname(s): Hoppers
- Motto: 'The family club'
- Club song: 'We are the Green and Whites'

Club details
- Founded: 1932; 93 years ago
- Colours: dark green white
- Competition: Picola & District
- President: Ben Cope
- Coach: Jarryd Fountain 2024-2025
- Captain(s): Leon Wolfe
- Premierships: 2011, 2017, 2018

Uniforms
Home

The Rennie Football Netball Club is an Australian rules football and netball club based in the southern Riverina town of Rennie.

The club currently competes in the Picola & District Football League, having previously competed in the Hume Football League and the Coreen & District Football League.

In 1944, there was a Coreen & District Junior Patriotic Football Association with Rennie defeating Coreen in the grand final at Coreen then in 1945 Oaklands defeated Rennie in the grand final which was played at Coreen.

== Premierships ==
Seniors

League	Timeframe	Flags	Premiership years
Coreen & District Football League	1932 - 2007	12	1938, 1939, 1940, 1952, 1954, 1955, 1969, 1970, 1972, 1983, 1985, 1992
Coreen & District Junior Patriotic Football Association	1944 & 45	1	1944
Hume Football Netball League	2008	Nil	
Picola & District Football League	2009 - 2021	3	2011, 2017, 2018

Reserves

?

Thirds

?

Fourths

?

== VFL / AFL Players ==
- 1956 - Jim Sandral - Melbourne
- 1995 - Jeff Bruce - Fitzroy
- 2015 - Daniel Howe - Hawthorn & North Melbourne
