= Keith Hollands =

Australian rules footballer

Personal information
- Full name: Keith Hollands
- Born: 31 December 1939
- Died: 9 October 2025 (aged 85); Nagambie
- Original team: Cobram
- Height: 173 cm (5 ft 8 in)
- Weight: 74 kg (163 lb)

Playing career^{1}
Years	Club	Games (Goals)
1961	North Melbourne	2 (0)
- ^{1} Playing statistics correct to the end of 1961.

Keith Hollands (31 December 1939 – 9 October 2025) was an Australian rules footballer who played with North Melbourne in the Victorian Football League (VFL).
