= Jackie Huggard =

Australian rules footballer

Personal information
- Full name: John Maxwell Huggard
- Born: 28 January 1926
- Died: 20 April 2016 (aged 90)
- Original teams: Cobram, Essendon Stars
- Height: 170 cm (5 ft 7 in)
- Weight: 67 kg (148 lb)
- Position: Rover

Playing career^{1}
Years	Club	Games (Goals)
1945	Essendon	1 (0)
1946	North Melbourne	7 (3)
Total		8 (3)
- ^{1} Playing statistics correct to the end of 1946.

John Maxwell "Jackie" Huggard (28 January 1926 – 20 April 2016) was an Australian rules footballer who played with Essendon and North Melbourne in the Victorian Football League (VFL). He won Essendon's reserves best and fairest in 1945. He worked as an engineer for Trans Australia Airlines. Huggard's father, Jack, played VFL football for Richmond.
