= Jack Huggard =

Australian rules footballer

Personal information
- Full name: Jack Huggard
- Born: 25 August 1901
- Died: 18 August 1972 (aged 70)
- Original teams: Kialla, Tatura, Rushworth, Cobram
- Height: 177 cm (5 ft 10 in)
- Weight: 70 kg (154 lb)

Playing career^{1}
Years	Club	Games (Goals)
1925–1927	Richmond	28 (43)
- ^{1} Playing statistics correct to the end of 1927.

Jack Huggard (25 August 1901 – 18 August 1972) was an Australian rules footballer who played with Richmond in the Victorian Football League (VFL). His son, Jackie, played VFL football for Essendon and North Melbourne.

Huggard was the Goulburn Valley Football Association and Cobram's leading goal kicker in 1924 with 56 goals, prior to being invited to play with Richmond in 1925.

Huggard kicked five goals on debut for Richmond against South Melbourne in round four, 1925.

Huggard was captain-coach of the Benalla Football Club in the Ovens and Murray Football League in 1928 and then returned to Melbourne, playing with Camberwell in the Victorian Football Association (VFA) in 1929.

Younger brother of Richmond player, Frank Huggard.
