= John E. Hoiles =

Australian rules footballer (1938–2026)

John Hoiles

Personal information
- Full name: John Edmund Hoiles
- Born: 11 August 1938
- Died: 29 September 2026 (aged 88)
- Original team: Sunbury
- Height: 188 cm (6 ft 2 in)
- Weight: 85 kg (187 lb)
- Position: Centre half back

Playing career^{1}
Years	Club	Games (Goals)
1957–1964	Footscray	117 (7)
- ^{1} Playing statistics correct to the end of 1964.

John Edmund Hoiles (11 August 1938 – 29 September 2026) was an Australian rules footballer who played with Footscray in the Victorian Football League (VFL).

== Career ==
Hoiles, who was a blacksmith, played as a key defender for Footscray, after starting his career as a ruckman. He was used as a centre half-back in the 1961 VFL Grand Final, which Footscray lost to Hawthorn.

From midway through the 1959 VFL season until the end of the 1964 season, Hoiles put together 101 consecutive games.

He didn't extend the streak further in 1965 and instead signed with Ovens & Murray Football League (OMFL) side Corowa, as captain-coach. Following his stint as coach, Hoiles played in Corowa's 1968 premiership, their first since 1932.

Hoiles went onto be captain / coach of Leitchville in the Northern District Football League in 1969.

== Personal life and death ==
Hoiles died on 29 September 2026, at the age of 88. He had a son, also named John, who played for Geelong during the 1980s.
