= Harold Dickinson (footballer) =

Australian rules footballer (1908–1988)

Personal information
- Full name: Harold Dickinson
- Born: 8 August 1908
- Died: 29 April 1988 (aged 79)
- Original team: Cobram

Playing career^{1}
Years	Club	Games (Goals)
1933	Essendon	2 (2)
- ^{1} Playing statistics correct to the end of 1933.

Harold Dickinson (8 August 1908 – 29 April 1988) was an Australian rules footballer who played with Essendon in the Victorian Football League (VFL).
