= Paul O'Donoghue =

Australian rules footballer

Personal information
- Full name: Paul O'Donoghue
- Born: 2 June 1954 (age 72)
- Original team: Corowa
- Height: 189 cm (6 ft 2 in)
- Weight: 83 kg (183 lb)

Playing career^{1}
Years	Club	Games (Goals)
1976	North Melbourne	1 (0)
- ^{1} Playing statistics correct to the end of 1976.

Paul O'Donoghue (born 2 June 1954) is a former Australian rules footballer who played with North Melbourne in the Victorian Football League (VFL).
