= John M. Hoiles =

Australian rules footballer

John Hoiles

Personal information
- Full name: John M. Hoiles
- Born: 3 February 1961 (age 65)
- Original team: Grovedale
- Height: 183 cm (6 ft 0 in)
- Weight: 80 kg (176 lb)

Playing career^{1}
Years	Club	Games (Goals)
1985–1986	Geelong	7 (0)
- ^{1} Playing statistics correct to the end of 1986.

John M. Hoiles (born 3 February 1961) is a former Australian rules footballer who played with Geelong in the Victorian Football League (VFL).

A Grovedale recruit, Hoiles made seven appearances for Geelong, two late in the 1985 VFL season and five in the 1986 season.

He is the son of John E. Hoiles, a former Footscray player.
