= Charlie Tuck =

Australian rules footballer

Personal information
- Full name: Charlie Tuck
- Born: 11 November 1892
- Died: 14 February 1968 (aged 75)
- Original team: Cobram

Playing career^{1}
Years	Club	Games (Goals)
1920	Richmond	1 (0)
- ^{1} Playing statistics correct to the end of 1920.

Charlie Tuck (11 November 1892 – 14 February 1968) was a former Australian rules footballer who played with Richmond in the Victorian Football League (VFL).
