= Alwin Dalitz =

Australian rules footballer

Personal information
- Full name: Alwin Clarence Dalitz
- Born: 18 May 1894; Pimpinio, Victoria
- Died: 29 January 1969 (aged 74); Nhill, Victoria
- Original team: Nhill
- Height: 180 cm (5 ft 11 in)
- Weight: 79 kg (174 lb)

Playing career^{1}
Years	Club	Games (Goals)
1922	Fitzroy	1 (3)
- ^{1} Playing statistics correct to the end of 1922.

Alwin Clarence Dalitz (18 May 1894 – 29 January 1969) was an Australian rules footballer who played for the Fitzroy Football Club in the Victorian Football League (VFL).

"Clarrie" Dalitz played his one match with Fitzroy after the 1922 Wimmera Football League season had finished for Nhill.

Dalitz made a fine debut in round 18 kicking three goals. and "showing skill in getting the ball".

Dalitz returned to his preferred environment to continue playing with Nhill.
