= Peter Ennals =

Australian rules footballer

Personal information
- Full name: Peter Ennals
- Born: 23 July 1943
- Died: 16 July 2025
- Original team: Cobram
- Height: 188 cm (6 ft 2 in)
- Weight: 86 kg (190 lb)

Playing career^{1}
Years	Club	Games (Goals)
1965	Footscray	1 (0)
- ^{1} Playing statistics correct to the end of 1965.

Peter Ennals (born 23 July 1943) is a former Australian rules footballer who played with Footscray in the Victorian Football League (VFL).
