= Irish Sign Language =

Sign language of Ireland, used primarily in Ireland

- Teanga Chomharthaíochta na hÉireann
- Native to: Ireland, Northern Ireland
- Native speakers: 5,000 deaf (2014); 45,000 hearing signers
- Language family: Francosign: Irish Sign Language
- Dialects: Australian Irish Sign Language

Official status
- Official language in: Ireland

Language codes
- ISO 639-3: isg
- Glottolog: iris1235

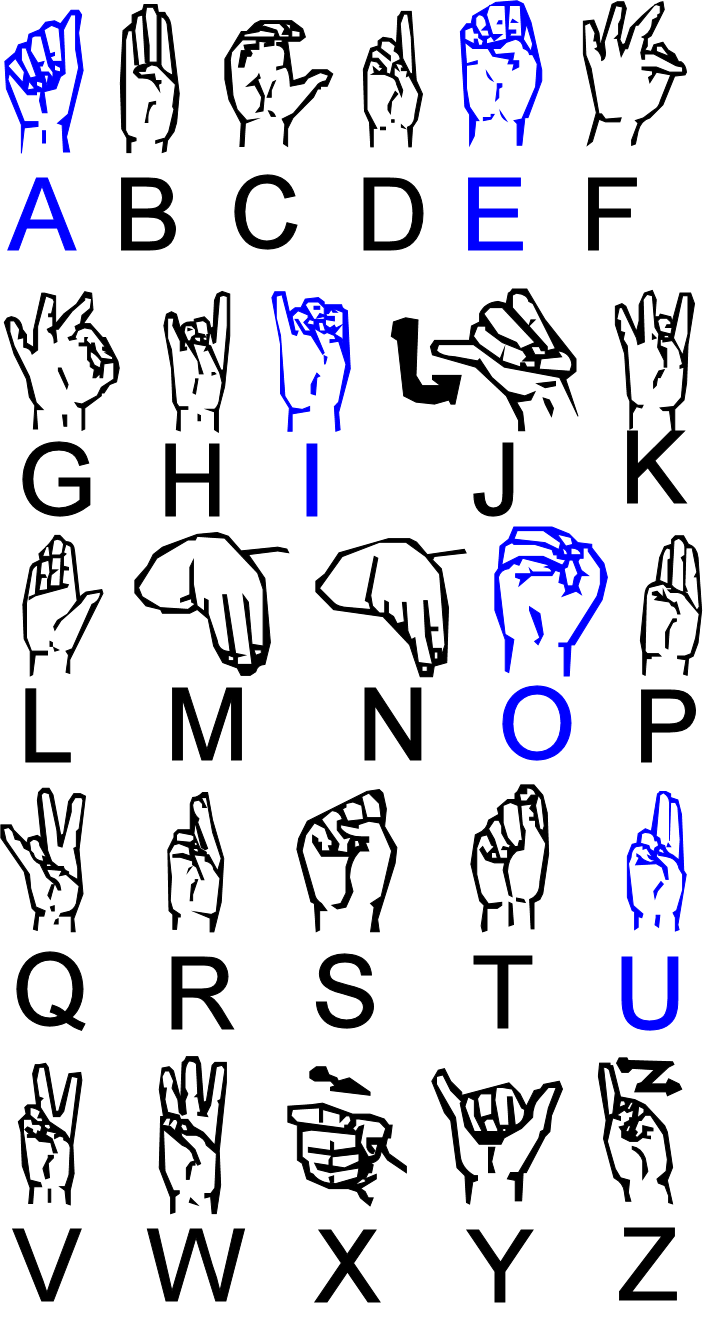
The ISL manual/fingerspelling alphabet

Irish Sign Language (ISL, Irish: Teanga Chomharthaíochta na hÉireann) is the sign language of Ireland, used primarily in Ireland. It is also used in Northern Ireland, alongside British Sign Language (BSL). Irish Sign Language is more closely related to French Sign Language (LSF) than to BSL, though it has influence from both languages. It has influenced sign languages in Australia and South Africa, and has little relation to either spoken Irish or English. ISL is unique among sign languages for having different gendered versions due to men and women being taught it at different schools all over Ireland.

== History ==
=== Development ===
The earliest known references to signing in Ireland come from the 18th century. According to Ethnologue, the language has influence from both French Sign Language (LSF) and British Sign Language (BSL), as well as from signed French and signed English, BSL having been introduced in Dublin in 1816.

==== Global reach ====
ISL was brought by Catholic missionaries to Australia, and to Scotland and England, with remnants of ISL still visible in some variants of BSL, especially in Glasgow, and with some elderly Auslan Catholics still using ISL today. In South Africa, the Dominican nuns who established Catholic Schools saw a need for a school for the deaf, but due to resource constraints were not in a position to do this immediately. Instead, they wrote back to their Mother House in Cabra requesting an experienced teacher of the deaf. A deaf teacher, Bridget Lynne, responded. Remnants of gendered generational Irish Sign Language are thought to still be visible in some dialects of South African Sign Language, which can probably be traced back to Lynne.

=== 19th century ===
The first school for deaf children in Ireland, the Claremont Institution, was established in 1816 by Dr. Charles Orpen. According to admission documents between 1816 and 1822, about half of the students admitted already knew some form of signing. Conama and Leonard suggest that this points to evidence of an older, undocumented form of ISL.

The Claremont Institution was a Protestant institution and given that Ireland was then a part of the United Kingdom, it is no surprise that BSL (or some version of signed English based in BSL) was used for teaching and learning (Pollard 2006). St. Mary's School for Deaf Girls sent two teachers and two students to Caen in France for 6 months; the students there likely learned LSF, which likely influenced ISL when the students returned to Ireland. McDonnell (1979) reports that the Irish institutions – Catholic and Protestant – did not teach the children to speak, and that it was not until 1887 that Claremont changed from a manual to an oral approach. For the Catholic schools, the shift to oralism came later: St. Mary's School for Deaf Girls moved to an oral approach in 1946 and St. Joseph's School for Deaf Boys shifted to oralism in 1956, though this did not become formal state policy until 1972. Sign language use was seriously suppressed and religion was used to further stigmatise the language (e.g. children were encouraged to give up signing for Lent and sent to confession if caught signing). The fact that the Catholic schools are segregated on the basis of gender led to the development of a gendered-generational variant of Irish Sign Language that is still evident (albeit to a lesser degree) today.

=== 20th century ===
In September 1992, coinciding with Deaf Awareness Week, RTÉ introduced a nightly news bulletin, News for the Deaf, signed by a Deaf person at the end of RTÉ News.

== Oireachtas bill ==
The "Recognition of Irish Sign Language for the Deaf Community Bill 2016" passed all stages in the Oireachtas (Irish Parliament) on 14 December 2017, and was signed into law under the revised title, The Irish Sign Language Act 2017. The Act was signed into law by the President of Ireland Michael D Higgins on 24 December 2017. The Act, which commenced on December 23, 2020, requires that public services are available through ISL and also outlines the need for greater access to education through sign language. Prior to the passage, there was no automatic right for deaf people to have an ISL interpreter (except for criminal court proceedings). For the deaf community, recognition of ISL means more legal rights and better access to public services - including education, healthcare, media and banking.

== Language code ==
The ISO 639-3 code for Irish Sign Language is isg; isl is the code for Icelandic.

== See also ==
- Auslan
- Australian Irish Sign Language
- Deafness in Ireland
- Irish manual alphabet
- Lámh
- Northern Ireland Sign Language
- South African Sign Language
