= Bernie Miller (footballer) =

Australian rules footballer

Personal information
- Full name: Bernard Michael Miller
- Born: 3 May 1915; Berrigan, New South Wales
- Died: 19 April 1960 (aged 44); Berrigan, New South Wales
- Original team: Berrigan
- Height: 170 cm (5 ft 7 in)
- Weight: 69 kg (152 lb)

Playing career^{1}
Years	Club	Games (Goals)
1937	Geelong	6 (0)
- ^{1} Playing statistics correct to the end of 1937.

Bernard Michael Miller (3 May 1915 – 19 April 1960) was an Australian rules footballer who played for the Geelong Football Club in the Victorian Football League (VFL).
