= Peter Doyle =

Peter Doyle may refer to:

== Sportspeople ==
- Peter Doyle (cyclist) (1945–2025), Irish Olympic cyclist
- Peter Doyle (footballer, born 1973), Australian footballer for Fitzroy
- Peter Doyle (footballer, born 1955), Australian footballer for Geelong
- Peter Doyle (soccer), Australian former international soccer player

== Others ==
- Peter Hogarth Doyle (1925–2007), Royal Australian Navy admiral
- Peter Doyle (chemist) (1921–2004), British chemist
- Peter Doyle (singer) (1949–2001), Australian pop singer
- Peter Doyle (writer) (born 1951), Australian crime novelist and true crime writer
- Peter Doyle (politician) (1844–1900), eleventh Secretary of State of Wisconsin
- Peter Doyle (transit worker) (1843–1907), Washington DC streetcar conductor and lover of Walt Whitman
- Peter Doyle (bishop) (born 1944), Roman Catholic Bishop of Northampton
