= 1957 Brownlow Medal =

- Winner: Brian Gleeson (St Kilda); 24 votes

Television/radio coverage
- Network: Seven Network

The 1957 Brownlow Medal was the 30th year the award was presented to the player adjudged the fairest and best player during the Victorian Football League (VFL) home and away season. Brian Gleeson of the St Kilda Football Club won the medal by polling twenty-four votes during the 1957 VFL season.

== Leading votegetters ==
	Player	Votes
1st	Brian Gleeson (St Kilda)	24
2nd	Roy Wright (Richmond)	20
3rd	John James (Carlton)	19
4th	Jim Taylor (South Melbourne)	16
5th	Harold Davies (St Kilda)	14
6th	John Beckwith (Melbourne)	13
=7th	Kevin Murray (Fitzroy)	12
=7th	Ted Whitten (Footscray)	12
=7th	Peter Pianto (Geelong)	12
=7th	Alf Hughes (Hawthorn)	12
