= Bernadette Wallis =

Australian religious sister from the Missionary Sisters of Service

Sr Bernadette Wallis MSS

Personal life
- Born: Bernadette Therese Wallis Melbourne, Australia
- Known for: Writing on Australian-Irish Sign Language; biographical work on John Corcoran Wallis
- Occupation: Religious sister, author

Religious life
- Religion: Christianity
- Denomination: Roman Catholic
- Order: Missionary Sisters of Service

Bernadette Wallis MSS, is an Australian religious sister and author, associated with the Missionary Sisters of Service, a Catholic religious congregation founded in 1944. Her work includes pastoral ministry in rural Australia, leadership within her congregation, and publications on Australian Catholic history and Australian-Irish Sign Language (AISL).

== Early life and religious vocation ==
Bernadette Therese Wallis was born in Melbourne, and grew up in Berrigan, in the Riverina region of southern New South Wales. She joined the Missionary Sisters of Service in 1965 and undertook pastoral work in rural and outback parish settings in Tasmania and western New South Wales, before commencing ministry with the Catholic Deaf community in Victoria.

== Ministry and service ==
The Missionary Sisters of Service was founded in 1944 by Father John Corcoran Wallis, a catholic priest who was originally from Yea, in country Victoria. Bernadette is his niece, and her later research and writing have contributed to the documentation of his life and legacy. In 2024, the Missionary Sisters of Service celebrated the 80th anniversary of their founding.

For many years, Wallis has been involved in leadership roles associated with the Missionary Sisters of Service. She was the director of both The John Wallis Foundation and Highways and Byways – A Community of Service. Both entities were established to work in today's world in the spirit of the Missionary Sisters of Service and their founder, Father John Wallis. Bernadette has also been a member of the order's Stewardship Council.

Wallis is a member of the Australian Religious Archive Committee, which is working to establish a joint religious archive to preserve the records of an initial group of five congregations. Participating groups include the Brigidine Sisters, Faithful Companions of Jesus, Missionary Sisters of Service, Presentation Sisters of Victoria, and the University of Divinity.

== Writing and research ==
In 2019, Wallis published Dear Mother Dear Father: Letters Home from John Corcoran Wallis, 1927–1949, a collection of letters written by her uncle to his parents between 1927 and 1949. The book provides insight into the founder's formation, pastoral ministry, and the early foundations of the Missionary Sisters of Service.

In 2016, Wallis co-authored The Silent Book: A Deaf Family and the Disappearing Australian-Irish Sign Language with linguist Michael Rebbechi. The book documents Wallis's experience growing up in a deaf family and examines the decline of Australian-Irish Sign Language (AISL), a minority sign language introduced to Australia from Ireland in 1875 by Irish Dominican nuns, including a deaf nun. They established three schools that used AISL as the language of instruction.

AISL ceased to be used as a language of instruction in the early 1950s due to oralist educational policies. The language is now considered endangered, with only a small number of remaining signers.

== Publications ==
- Wallis, Bernadette T. Dear Mother Dear Father: Letters Home from John Corcoran Wallis, 1927–1949. Bayswater, Victoria: Coventry Press, 2019.
- Wallis, Bernadette T. The Silent Book: A Deaf Family and the Disappearing Australian-Irish Sign Language. Rangeview, Victoria: Bernadette T. Wallis, 2016. ISBN 9780646954943
