= Brian Gleeson =

Brian Gleeson may refer to:

- Brian Gleeson (actor) (born 1987), Irish actor
- Brian Gleeson (footballer) (born 1934), Australian rules footballer
- Brian Gleeson (rugby union) (born 2004), Irish rugby union player
