= Berrigan Football Club =

Australian rules football club

Berrigan

Names
- Full name: Berrigan Football Club
- Nickname: Saints
- Club song: "When the Saints Go Marching In"

2021 season

Club details
- Founded: 1891; 135 years ago
- Colours
- Competition: Picola & District
- President: Stuart Schifferle
- Coach: Ty Russell & Tim McAuley
- Captain: Grant Martin
- Ground: Berrigan Sports Ground

Uniforms
Home

Other information
- Official website: http://www.berriganfc.sportingpulse.net

The Berrigan Football Netball Club, nicknamed the Saints, is an Australian rules football and netball club playing in the Picola & District Football League. The club is based in the small town of Berrigan located in the Riverina district of New South Wales.

== History ==
The Berrigan Football Club's first recorded match was against Cobram, at Cobram in 1891 and initially competed in the Murray Border Football Association in 1895 and 1896, then competed in the Southern Riverina Football Association (SRFA) from 1905 to 1930.

Berrigan won ten SRFA premierships against teams such as Finley, Leniston, Tocumwal and Jerilderie.

In 1931 and 1932, Berrigan, Finley and Nathalia applied to join the Murray Football League, but were rejected on the grounds of excessive travel for the other competing club. Berrigan and Finley remained in the SRFA in 1931, but in 1932, Jerilderie went into recess and Oaklands and Urana pulled out of the SRFA, which saw this competition ultimately cease. This left Berrigan and Finley without an official competition to play in, in 1932. Berrigan, Finley and Jerilderie did play in the SRFA junior competition from 1930 to 1932.

In 1933 Berrigan joined the Murray Football League and played in ten grand finals and won five premierships against long-running Murray Football League teams such as – Numurkah, Nathalia, Cobram and Tocumwal.

It was between 1980 and 2002 that Berrigan struggled to win games in the Murray Football League and started to fall behind the other teams and looked like folding at one stage, but through the use of the strong community of the town, the club decided to join the Picola & District Football League.

Berrigan struggled to win games until the 2009 season when the Picola League split into two divisions, which left Berrigan competing against teams such as Jerilderie, Blighty, Deniliquin, Strathmerton, Picola United, Mathoura, Yarroweyah and Wunghnu in the North West conference.

Berrigan made the top three in the 2009 season and made it to its first grand final in 29 years, however the saints lost to their rivals Jerilderie by three points. In the 2011 season, Berrigan were premiers in the PDFL. As hosts of the grand final, the saints defeated Jerilderie by 34 points. It is through these previous grand finals and Murray League football that Berrigan and Jerilderie have developed a fierce rivalry.

The Berrigan Saints club rooms were completely re-built and the change room renovated. The venue is able to host large crowds and grand finals.

== Football competitions timeline ==
Berrigan FC have played in the following football competitions –

- 1891 to 1894: Active playing friendly matches against other local towns
- 1895 and 1896: Murray Border Football Association
- 1897: Active playing friendly matches against other local towns.
- 1898: Active playing friendly matches against other local towns. The club being so isolated found it difficult to find opponents that would travel.
- 1899 and 1900: Club in recess.
- 1901: Club re-forms. Active playing friendly matches against other local towns.
- 1902 to 1904: Club in recess.
- 1905 to 1931: Southern Riverina Football Association
- 1932: Club in recess, but played some friendly matches against other local towns.
- 1933 to 2002: Murray Football League
- 2003 to present day: Picola & District Football League

== Football Premierships ==
Seniors

(Total: 18)

- Southern Riverina Football Association (1905–1931)
  - 1906, 1909, 1913, 1916, 1917, 1919, 1920, 1921, 1924, 1925
- Murray Football League (1933–2002)
  - 1931, 1934, 1936, 1965, 1968, 1980
- Picola & District Football League (2003–present)
  - 2011

Reserves

2020 Berrigan 4ths (with deni)

- Murray Valley Second Eighteen Football Association
  - 1939, 1947

Thirds

?

Fourths

?

== VFL / AFL players ==
The following footballers played with Berrigan, prior to playing senior football in the VFL/AFL with the year indicating their debut.

- 1927 – Clarrie Lonsdale – Hawthorn
- 1937 – Bernie Miller – Geelong
- 1942 – Tom Bush – Melbourne
- 1950 – Ray Ednie – Richmond
- 1953 – Brian Gleeson – St. Kilda. (Won the 1957 Brownlow Medal)
- 1957 – Bill Clements – Richmond
- 1960 – Bob Chisholm – South Melbourne
- 1960 – Brian Chisholm OAM – South Melbourne
- 1964 – Fred Way – South Melbourne
- 1974 – Peter Doyle – Geelong
- 1988 – Tim Powell – Richmond & Carlton
- 1994 – Tim Hargreaves – Hawthorn & Geelong

== Coaches ==
- 2021
  - Seniors: Ty Russell
  - Reserves: Damon Ferguson
  - U/17's: Tim Cooper
  - U/14's: Craig Thornton
- 2012 (Seniors – Runners-Up)
  - Seniors: Justin Hoggan,
  - Reserves: Kevin McQualter,
  - U/17's: Jamie Hicks,
  - U/14's: Josh Bozzolla
- 2011 (Seniors – Premiers)
  - Seniors: Jamie Robinson,
  - Reserves: John Creenhaune,
  - U/17's: Adam Fox/Dean Loats,
  - U/14's: Kevin McQualter,
