= Brian Chisholm =

Brian Chisholm may refer to:

- Brian Chisholm (footballer) (1938–2023), Australian rules footballer
- Brian Chisholm (politician) (born 1970), American politician, member of the Maryland House of Delegates
