= Fred Way =

Australian rules footballer

Personal information
- Born: 9 February 1944 (age 82)
- Original team: Berrigan
- Height: 196 cm (6 ft 5 in)
- Weight: 92 kg (203 lb)

Playing career^{1}
Years	Club	Games (Goals)
1964–1971	South Melbourne	81 (14)
- ^{1} Playing statistics correct to the end of 1971.

Fred Way (born 9 February 1944) is a former Australian rules footballer who played with South Melbourne in the Victorian Football League (VFL).

A knock ruckman, Way played six games in his debut season in 1964 and played with Berrigan in 1965, then played 18 games with South Melbourne in 1966. Way returned to play with Berrigan in 1967 and 1968 and won the 1968 Murray Football League’s O’Dwyer Medal and played in Berrigan's 1968 premiership team.

Way was lured back to South Melbourne to play under Norm Smith and had a successful season in 1969 when he finished second in his club's best and fairest. He also represented Victoria at the 1969 Adelaide Carnival and in 1970 played VFL finals football for the first time.

Way was based in Berrigan, New South Wales and use to drive down to Melbourne in his truck on a Friday night, unload the truck and stay at Norm Smith's house. He would then get up in the morning, load the truck, play for South Melbourne and then drive home.

His son Tony played Under 19's and Reserves football with Collingwood from 1987 to 1989.
