= Caladenia callitrophila =

Berrigan spider orchid

Scientific classification
- Kingdom: Plantae
- Clade: Tracheophytes
- Clade: Angiosperms
- Clade: Monocots
- Order: Asparagales
- Family: Orchidaceae
- Subfamily: Orchidoideae
- Tribe: Diurideae
- Genus: Caladenia
- Species: C. callitrophila

Binomial name
- Caladenia callitrophila D.L.Jones & M.A.Clem.

Synonyms
- Arachnorchis callitrophila (D.L.Jones) D.L.Jones & M.A.Clem.

Species of orchid

Caladenia callitrophila, commonly known as the Berrigan spider orchid, is a plant in the orchid family Orchidaceae and is endemic to a small area in New South Wales. It has a single leaf and one or two pale greenish-yellow flowers with red markings and only occurs in three small populations.

== Description ==
Caladenia callitrophila is a terrestrial, perennial, deciduous, herb with an underground tuber and a single leaf, 70–130 mm (3–5 in) long and 4–12 mm (0.2–0.5 in) wide. One or two flowers are borne on a stalk 200–350 mm (8–10 in) tall. The flowers are pale greenish-yellow with reddish marks and are 50–60 mm (2.0–2.4 in) wide. The dorsal sepal is erect, 25–40 mm (1–2 in) long and about 2 mm (0.08 in) wide while the lateral sepals are about the same length but twice as wide, spread widely and turn down below horizontal. The petals are 20–30 mm (0.8–1 in) long and about 2 mm (0.08 in) wide and also deflected downwards at an angle. The labellum is 12–15 mm (0.5–0.6 in) long and 7–9 mm (0.3–0.4 in) wide, yellowish with red lines and a maroon tip. The labellum curves forward and downwards and there are six to nine pairs of red teeth on its sides. The mid-line of the labellum has four or six rows of maroon calli up to 1 mm (0.04 in) long. Flowering occurs from September to October.

== Taxonomy and naming ==
Caladenia callitrophila was first formally described by David L. Jones in 1999 and the description was published in The Orchadian from a specimen collected near Berrigan. The specific epithet (callitrophila) is derived from the name of cypress pines in the genus Callitris. This orchid grows in Callitris woodland.

== Distribution and habitat ==
Berrigan orchid occurs in three small scattered populations near Berrigan where it grows in Callistris woodland.
