= Bill Clements (Australian footballer) =

Australian rules footballer (1933–2025)

Personal information
- Born: 8 October 1933
- Died: 9 January 2025 (aged 91)
- Original team: Berrigan
- Height: 179 cm (5 ft 10 in)
- Weight: 75 kg (165 lb)

Playing career^{1}
Years	Club	Games (Goals)
1957–59	Richmond	14 (2)
- ^{1} Playing statistics correct to the end of 1959.

Bill Clements (8 October 1933 – 9 January 2025) was an Australian rules footballer who played with Richmond in the Victorian Football League (VFL). He died on 9 January 2025, at the age of 91.
