= Missionary Sisters of Service =

Roman Catholic female congregation

Missionary Sisters of Service (MSS) is a Roman Catholic apostolic congregation of women religious founded by Australian priest Father John Corcoran Wallis in 1944. Initially, the group's mission was focused in rural and outback regions of Australia. This expanded over time to include working with people in more populated areas who are living on the margins.

== History ==
The Missionary Sisters of Service was founded in 1944 by Father John Corcoran Wallis, who was originally from Yea, in country Victoria. The order was originally inaugurated on 15 August 1944 in Launceston, Tasmania, as the Home Missionary Sisters of Our Lady, with an initial group of four women. Later that same year, they made promises of poverty, chastity and obedience for a period of twelve months. In 1947, they were permitted to live as a society of religious women in a community without public vows. In the following two years, they commenced their first significant mission and established their first mission house in Longford, Tasmania, near Launceston.

In 1950, Wallis accompanied the archbishop of Hobart, Dr Ernest Tweedy, to Rome. While there, they received the blessing of Pope Pius XII for the new religious community. The status of the community was also raised to a Religious Congregation with public vows. The following year, in August 1951, the Home Missionary Sisters of Our Lady was formally constituted as a religious congregation, and twelve sisters took their public vows. In 1971, the name of the congregation was changed to Missionary Sisters of Service. The sisters were fondly known as the ‘Caravan Sisters’ due to the large distances they travelled, seeking out people in small and remote communities and on isolated properties across Australia.

John Corcoran Wallis' niece, Bernadette Wallis, joined the Missionary Sisters of Service in 1965. In 2019, she published a book that explored the founder's life through the hundreds of letters written to his parents between the years of 1927 and 1949. John Corcoran Wallis received an Order of Australia in the 1992 Australia Day Honours for services to religion.

Since their inception, the Missionary Sisters of Service have worked in Tasmania, Victoria, New South Wales, Queensland, South Australia and Singapore. A book published in 2019 commemorated 75 years of the order and included a collection of recipes, stories, historical information and photos. In 2024, the Missionary Sisters of Service celebrated the 80th anniversary of their founding.

The Missionary Sisters of Service is one of the founding congregations involved in establishing the Australian Religious Archive, a collaborative project to create a joint archive to preserve the records of participating congregations.

== Notable sisters ==
- Bernadette Wallis
