= Ray Ednie =

Australian rules footballer

Personal information
- Full name: Ray Ednie
- Born: 3 October 1927
- Died: 14 March 1980 (aged 52)
- Original team: Berrigan
- Height: 180 cm (5 ft 11 in)
- Weight: 86 kg (190 lb)

Playing career^{1}
Years	Club	Games (Goals)
1950, 1952–53	Richmond	23 (13)
- ^{1} Playing statistics correct to the end of 1953.

Ray Ednie (3 October 1927 – 14 March 1980) was a former Australian rules footballer who played with Richmond in the Victorian Football League (VFL).
