= Deafness in Ireland =

In Ireland, 8% of adults are affected by deafness or severe hearing loss. In other words, 300,000 Irish require supports due to their hearing loss.

== Language emergence ==
In Ireland, Irish Sign Language (ISL) is the sign language which emerged between 1846 and 1849. ISL is used in Northern Ireland as well; however, British Sign Language is more commonly used there. ISL is its own language and shares no relation to spoken or written languages. Instead, it is derived from American Sign Language and French Sign Language. Since its origin, ISL had been developed by deaf communities, and brought to other countries like Australia, South Africa, Scotland, and England. As of 2016, ISL is used by about 5,000 deaf people, and roughly 40,000 hearing people.

The first school for deaf children dates back to 1816 where children were originally taught not to speak. In Catholic schools, boys and girls were separated which caused males and females to use different signs for the same word. Then, in the 1950s Catholic schools switched from manual to oral education. Shortly after, an oral approach to education for deaf students became an official state policy in 1972. As a result, sign language was suppressed, as it was in schools worldwide where an oralist approach was taken.

On December 14, 2017, the Irish Parliament passed a bill which recognized ISL for the Deaf community. Before this date, Deaf Irish people did not immediately assume the right to an ISL interpreter. The Recognition of Irish Sign Language for the Deaf Community Bill 2016 provided improved access to public services such as education, healthcare, media, and banking.

== Significant organizations ==
=== Chime ===
In 1964 the National Association for Deaf People was established to promote the welfare of members as part of the Deaf community. Since then, this organization published the first ISL dictionary, started Family Support Services, and declared and legislated ISL as the official language of Irish people. In 2018 they were renamed Chime, and their mission statement is "to limit the impact of deafness and hearing loss through promoting accessibility, creating supportive communities, and enabling personal choice and community participation." Today, Declan Keane, the parent of a deaf child, is the chairman for Chime.

=== Irish Deaf Society ===
On January 13, 1981, the Irish Deaf Society (IDS) was established by a group of Deaf people because of their concern for the equality of Deaf individuals. The IDS strives to achieve Equality and Rights of Deaf people in Ireland, and encourage Deaf people in Ireland to celebrate their culture by continuing the use of ISL. Some of IDS's core values include ISL, human rights, social inclusion, equal opportunities, quality living conditions, and empowerment. Lianne Quigley serves as the IDS's Chairperson. Previously, she was the treasurer of the Irish Deaf Youth Association and co-chairperson of the ISL Recognition Campaign. She also works as a Deaf interpreter.

=== Sound Advice ===
Caroline Carswell, the founder of Sound Advice, was one of the first born-deaf children in Ireland to be mainstream-educated in the 1970s. Carswell was confirmed deaf at 16 months old and eventually found behind-the-ear (BTE) hearing aids before getting bilateral cochlear implants. Carswell is verbal and does not know sign language. After graduating from Trinity College Dublin, Carswell created Sound Advice in 2007. Her goal is to present hearing and ability through technology, health, education, and employment. Since establishing Sound Advice, they have helped creating Ireland's National Audiology Review (2011), Education Policy (2012) which mainstreams children who are deaf or heard of hearing, and HSE-funded bilateral cochlear implants (2013) for children under 18 years old.

== Human civil rights and the CRPD ==
The Convention on the Rights of Persons with Disabilities (CRPD) is a human rights treaty which was adopted in 2006 by the United Nations. The CRPD exists in order to protect the lives of disabled people. In 2007, the Irish Government signed the convention, and since, it has been revised in 2018. According to the "Initial Report of Ireland under the CRPD" in 2016, someone with deafness or a serious hearing impairment was considered a disabled person in Ireland.

- Article 13 (Access to justice): Paragraph 175 states that Deaf people in need of a sign language interpreter are eligible for jury service.
- Article 21 (Freedom of expression and opinion, and access to information): In paragraph 266 it says the Sign Language Interpreting Services (SLIS) is national recognized, and the SLIS's mission is to make sure Deaf people have the ability to live as equal citizens. To achieve this goal, the SLIS promotes and advocated for the availability of interpretation services to Deaf citizens of Ireland. Consequently, paragraph 267 states the NDIS will extend hours of ISL remote interpretation services to evenings and weekends. SLIS will also assist in increasing the amount of trained ISL interpreters. The article continues to say in paragraph 268 that SLIS introduced the "Introduction to Deaf Interpreting" at Trinity College Dublin, created a calendar of CPD events, established mentor training programs, and began researching ISL interpreting to contribute to their mission statement.
- Article 24 (Education): Paragraph 301 discusses how the National Plan for Equity of Access to Higher Education 2015-2021 created goals to increase the number of individuals with disabilities in higher education. As a result, data from 2017 shows a 46% increase in the participation in higher education of Deaf or hard of hearing individuals. Paragraph 332 states that in 2019 deaf participation increased again from 306 Deaf students in 2017 to 352. Also, 312 claims funding will be provided for trained visiting teachers to children who are deaf. Paragraph 327 goes on to say an ISL Bachelor of Education program was created in 2019.
- Article 27 (Work and employment): Within paragraph 403 it states that the Job Interview Interpreter Grant allocates funding for jobseekers who are deaf or hard of hearing to provide an interpreter to attend job interviews and the induction period with them.
- Article 29 (Participation in cultural life, recreation, leisure and sport): Paragraph 421 claims the Creative Ireland Program's Creative Communities initiative provides activities to those who are deaf such as creative methods encouraging the learning of ISL. In paragraph 426 the Irish Sign Language Act 2017 supplies accreditation schemas for ISL interpreters. The Registrar of ISL Interpreters ensures a registration system to maintain a standard for interpreters.

== Early hearing detection and intervention ==
In Ireland, all newborns are given a free hearing screen to test permanent hearing loss in one or both ears through the Health Service Executive (HSE). The HSE is the publicly funded healthcare system in Ireland. If a child is born at home, a public health nurse will schedule a screening at an outpatient facility before they reach one month old. If the screening does not show a clear results, a second screening will be scheduled before a baby leaves the hospital. One or two newborns in every 1,000 will be diagnosed with hearing loss in one or both of their ears. Health Services in Ireland urge the importance of screening babies as early as possible to ensure the best long term outcome. In addition, early screening detection allows for support and information to be provided to parents immediately. In unique cases such as babies with congenital atresia, bacterial meningitis, or receiving end-of-life support will not be screened. Instead they are sent to an audiologist.

=== Screening process ===
==== Automated otoacoustic emissions (AOAE) test ====
The test performed on babies to screen for hearing loss is called the automated otoacoustic emissions (AOAE) test. The AOAE test looks at a baby's inner ear or the cochlea while they are asleep. To begin, a little soft-tipped earpiece is inserted into the newborn's outer ear. Then, a clicking sound is played, and the screening equipment ensures the baby's inner ear is echoing the sound. If results are unclear the screener will repeat the test once or twice more.

==== Automated auditory brainstem response (AABR) test ====
When a child fails the AOAE test a second appointment is scheduled to take a closer look using the automated auditory brainstem response (AABR) test. This test will measure a baby's auditory nerve and the brain's response to sounds. At first, soft headphones are placed on the child's head in addition to three sensors on their neck and head. The screener will then play clicking sounds to see how the baby responds to sound. If a baby fails both tests, that does not necessarily imply they have hearing loss. Instead, there is a possibility the baby was unsettled at the time of testing, background noise was present, or there is fluid in their ears after birth. As a result, babies are sent to an audiologist to receive a diagnostics test.

=== Intervention ===
After discovering a child has hearing loss intervening early means the appropriate support can be given. By intervening early, a child's development is enhanced, language and literacy skills are increased, higher academic achievement, and allows for a better understanding among parents and children. Through the Early Childhood Care and Education (ECCE) children who are DHH are provided with free pre-school the year before they are supposed to start school. Also school aged students are provided with a Visiting Teacher Service who help in the inclusivity of DHH students in a mainstream setting. One of a visiting teachers responsibilities is to assess DHH students to determine if or what assistive technology is needed. Some examples of assistive technology include amplification systems, surround systems, and radio aids. In 2011 it was estimated about $2,100 was allocated for each DHH student in Ireland.

== Primary and secondary education ==
For Irish parents of DHH children, there are usually three options in terms of education during the primary and secondary level. Deciding between home school, mainstream education or a special school for the deaf can be a challenging decision.

=== Mainstream education ===
The most common option for DHH children is mainstream schools which makes up about 90 percent of Deaf students' education. When a Deaf child is sent to a mainstream school that means they are integrated into a classroom with other hearing children. There are only a few deaf children enrolled at one mainstream school at a time. Sometimes, this environment can be very frustrating for them because teachers may not have the time to provide additional support. As a result, a special needs assistant or visiting teacher may be needed for support. A special needs assistant will be provided only if support is needed in the classroom. In comparison, a visiting teacher will meet with the student one-on-one occasionally.

=== Schools for the deaf ===
In Ireland, there are three schools specifically for DHH students who aim to develop ISL skills. Firstly, St Mary's School for Deaf Girls and St Joseph's School for Deaf Boys are both located in Cabra, Dublin. Since the 1850s, these schools have offered boarding to students so those who do not live nearby can stay at the school during the week. The third school for Deaf students is Midwest School for the Deaf which is located in Limerick. This school was founded in 1979 for DHH individuals in the Mid-West region of Ireland, and here, education is provided from pre-school to post primary level. It is the only school in Ireland which specifically caters to pre-school aged DHH students.

==== St Mary's School for Deaf Girls ====
In 1846, the Catholic Institute for the Deaf began raising money for St Mary's School for Deaf Girls. Today, there are two separate schools for primary and secondary education. The children attending Marian Primary School follow the standard Department of Education curriculum, but the classroom environment is focused on educating DHH students. The school has both day and residential students, and provides transportation for students. The Rosary School provides education to secondary students. Here, a variety of programs are offered including Junior Certificates and Leaving Certificates, and a speech language therapist is provided to students.

==== St Joseph's School for Deaf Boys ====
Founded in 1857, the school's goal is to provide a safe, supportive, and educational place while meeting the needs of students, whom they hope to make independent and responsive citizens. St Joseph's School for Deaf Boys Primary educates students ranging from four to fourteen years old. They follow the National Curriculum similarly to mainstream schools while supplying Speech and Language Therapy. For secondary students, they will attend St Joseph's Secondary School for Deaf Boys where Junior Certificates and Leaving Certificates are offered. Services provided at the school include an audiologist, a speech and language therapist, a career counselor, a home and school liaison, and a psychologist. In addition, teachers at St Joseph's Secondary School for Deaf Boys are experienced in deaf or special education. Students attending learn both in signed and spoken environments to work on language development.

==== Midwest School for the Deaf ====
Beginning in 1979, the Midwest School for the Deaf was founded through fundraising from the Parent's Association to create more accessible education for DHH children. The school's primary classes range from four to seven students per classes to maintain a low pupil to teacher ratio. In addition, every student receives a Student Support Plan created by all stakeholders such as the student, teachers, parents, psychologists, Speech and Language therapists, and more. The Midwest School for the Deaf also prioritizes providing opportunities in the community for students in aims of adjoining mainstream schools. In primary school, student's are taught ISL. There are a number of programs for secondary students at Midwest School for the Deaf, and some even involve college courses at Limerick College of Further Education.

== Higher education ==
According to the Irish Deaf Society, support for higher education is improving for deaf individuals and many have received undergraduate to doctorate degrees through these supports.

=== Disability Access Route to Education ===
The Disability Access Route to Education (DARE) is a higher education alternative admission plan for students with disabilities who have completed secondary education. DARE is specifically for individuals under the age of 23 whose disability has negatively impacted their education. More specifically, DARE prioritizes applicants with a blind/ vision impairment and deaf/ hard of hearing. Applicants who meet the criteria are eligible for lower Leaving Certificate points, but they still must meet the minimum admissions requirement for any specific program. Other supports in college include orientation programs, learning supports, assistive technology, library support, exam accommodations, educational support workers, and academic tuition.

=== Deaf Support in Third Level Project (DS3) ===
Every summer, Trinity College Dublin hosts the Deaf Support in Third Level Project (DS3) Summer School to bring first year Irish DHH college students together. The goal of DS3 is to give new DHH students a practice day so that their transition to higher education is seamless. During this day, academic supports are introduced such as Irish Sign Language (ISL), interpreters, note-takers, "speedtext," assistive listening devices, and exam accommodations. The presentations this day are always given by current or previous DHH college students.

== Employment ==
A national study conducted by The Irish Times revealed Ireland has a general population employment rate of 64 percent, and 60 percent of the deaf community have jobs. The main difference is that the majority of deaf individuals have low-status jobs and receive low pay. In the study, the majority of 350 deaf participants said they were in manual work and expected no promotion. Almost 70 percent of them earned less than €461 a week or just €22,000 a year. Deaf people struggle to find decent paying jobs because of the 60 percent that stayed in school until they were 18, 25 percent received Leaving Certificates. Additional challenges DHH individuals face in education includes a low literacy level which impedes their job offers. In terms of social struggles, Deaf adults are often isolated by other employees and employers.

The Irish government offers support in order to fight the inequality DHH employees face. Some supports include reduced flexible work arrangements, modified task jobs, a Workplace Equipment/ Adaption Grant (WEAG), and wage subsidy. In addition, the government will reimburse employers who provide interpreters to facilitate job interviews.

=== Ongoing tasks ===
There is a lack of support for ISL interpreters for DHH employees after receiving the job. The WEAG would need to be expanded in order for more ISL interpreters to be supplied. In addition, establishing disability offices in every school would assist with Leaving Certificate rate. Lastly, the study by The Irish Times suggests creating specific actions to allow communication between Deaf and hearing employees at work.

== Healthcare ==
Under Article 25 of the CRPD, access to healthcare for individuals with disabilities, including deaf people, is required. However, a study done by Michael Schwartz revealed that health care provided needed cultural awareness. Also, he found that there was a shortage sign language interpreters, and with the few they have, they cause a divide between the Deaf patient and healthcare provider.

=== Cultural awareness ===
Deaf patients believe it is essential for healthcare providers to have knowledge of deaf culture, issues, and mental health because it is directly related to their appointments and visits. By better understanding the barriers Deaf people face, doctors can better help their patients.

=== Access to interpreters ===
Lots of Deaf people require an interpreter to communicate their health concerns to their doctor. If there is no interpreter available, it becomes very difficult for a Deaf patient to receive a diagnosis. Miscommunication between the two in this situation is at an all-time high which can lead to dangerous consequences.

=== Interpreter influence on communication ===
When an interpreter is present in the room, Deaf patients still describe difficulty communicating with their doctor. Lots of times, the doctor will not look at the patient, and instead speak to the interpreter. This makes it difficult for the Deaf patient to get their message across, causing more issues.
