= Tom Bush (Australian footballer) =

Australian rules footballer

Personal information
- Full name: Tom John Bush
- Born: 7 January 1918
- Died: 17 November 1951 (aged 33); Royal Melbourne Hospital, Melbourne
- Original team: Berrigan

Playing career^{1}
Years	Club	Games (Goals)
1942, 1944	Melbourne	5 (2)
- ^{1} Playing statistics correct to the end of 1944.

Tom Bush (7 January 1918 – 17 November 1951) was an Australian rules footballer who played with Melbourne in the Victorian Football League (VFL). He played five games for Melbourne from 1942 to 1944, and later played for several clubs in regional leagues. He won the best and fairest awards as captain-coach for Peechelba and Moyhu in the late 1940's and early 1950s.

== Early life and career ==
Bush, who was originally from Berrigan was cleared from St. Kilda to Melbourne where he played from 1942 to 1944.

Bush enlisted in the Australian Army in 1940.

== Professional career ==
Bush played one game on permit with Coburg in 1945.

Bush then played with Wangaratta in the Ovens & Murray Football League in 1945 and 1946 including their 1946 O&MFL premiership side, featuring in their best players.

Milawa Football Club appointed Bush as captain-coach in 1947. They were runners up in the Ovens & King Football League grand final to Moyhu in 1947.

Bush was then captain-coach of Coolamon Football Club in the South West Football League (New South Wales) in 1948 and led them to fifth position on the ladder.

In his first year as captain-coach of Peechelba Football Club in 1949 in the Murray Valley Football League, Bush won the league best and fairest award. Bush was captain-coach again 1950.

Bush was captain / coach of Moyhu Football Club in the Ovens & King Football League in 1951 and won their best and fairest award too.

== Death ==
Bush died at the Royal Melbourne Hospital after an eight-week illness in November 1951. He was 33 years old. Bush and his wife, Ruth had two young sons, Adrian and Paul, with a third son, Trevor who was born on the 29th March 1952.
