= Bob Chisholm (footballer) =

Australian rules footballer

Personal information
- Full name: Bob Chisholm
- Born: November 14, 1940
- Died: May 24, 2024
- Original team: Berrigan
- Height: 185 cm (6 ft 1 in)
- Weight: 73 kg (161 lb)

Playing career^{1}
Years	Club	Games (Goals)
1960–62	South Melbourne	22 (20)
- ^{1} Playing statistics correct to the end of 1962.

Robert (Bob) Chisholm was a former Australian rules footballer who played with South Melbourne in the Victorian Football League (VFL).
