= Edith Bryan =

Teacher and activist for the deaf

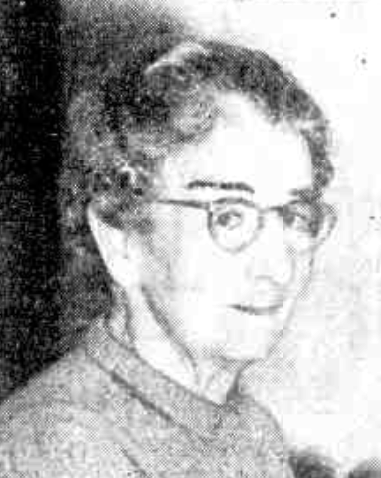
- Bryan in 1950
- Born: Edith Lloyd; 29 June 1872; Derby, Derbyshire, England
- Died: 29 March 1963 (aged 90); Ascot, Queensland, Australia
- Occupation(s): deaf education teacher and activist
- Years active: 1892–1937

Edith Bryan (29 June 1872 – 29 March 1963) was an English teacher of the deaf, who after teaching in England and Ireland, emigrated to Australia and became one of the educators who contributed to the development of Special Education in Queensland. Though trained in the oralist tradition, she supported the use of sign language and fingerspelling for teaching purposes. From 1901 to 1926, she was the head teacher of the school operated by the Queensland Blind Deaf and Dumb Institute. An activist, she pressed for the training of special education students to become mandatory, and fought for their teachers to be paid the same salaries as other teachers. From 1926 to 1937 she taught at the Queensland school where she became responsible for the courses for deaf students. After her retirement, she volunteered at the Edith Bryan Hostel, a facility that offered housing and medical assistance to deaf citizens. She is considered to be one of the two most influential pioneers of special education in Queensland.

== Early life ==
Edith Lloyd was born on 29 June 1872 in the Friar Gate area of Derby, in Derbyshire, England to Mary (née Johnson) and William Lloyd. Her father was a master tailor and Edith was the oldest of the couple's six children. From 1887 to 1891, she attended the local council school and then continued her education as a pupil-teacher at the Midland Deaf and Dumb Institution, later known as the Royal Institute for the Deaf and Dumb in her hometown. In 1892, Lloyd earned her diploma to teach from the Training College for Teachers of the Deaf in London, which had been established in 1878.

Lloyd was admitted as a member of the College of the Teachers of the Deaf and Dumb, which was founded in 1885, to regulate deaf instructors, promote professionalism, and examine their competency. Her training would have included instruction based on the influential works of Thomas Arnold, who wrote training textbooks for teachers of the deaf and was a successful oralist. She later used his texts in her classes, but also was a proficient signer. She supported fingerspelling and signing for students who were unable to speak or did not lip read.

== Career ==
Lloyd began her teaching career in Ireland at the Claremont Institute for the Deaf and Dumb in Glasnevin, Dublin, in 1891 and then moved to London to teach at the Jews' Deaf and Dumb Home for Children until 1893, when she returned to Derby. In 1895, she followed her fiancé Cecil Charles Bryan, a former classmate, to Adelaide, South Australia, where they were married on 29 June. He had been hired as a senior teacher at the South Australian Institution for the Blind, Deaf and Dumb but he died in 1897 after a brief illness and she returned to Great Britain, as a private teacher in Portrush, Northern Ireland. In 1899, she moved to Tyndall's Park, Bristol, to teach at the Institution for the Deaf and Dumb.

In 1901, Bryan was hired as the head teacher at the school run by the Queensland Blind Deaf and Dumb Institute charity organization. Isaac Dickson, was the supervising officer of both the home and school run by the organization. On 12 November, Bryan arrived in Brisbane to take up her post and served as the head teacher until 1926, though in 1918 the charity was taken over by the government and she became a state employee. In 1902, she was one of the founders of the Queensland Adult Deaf and Dumb Mission and successfully organized a support group for parents. In addition, she attended appointments with deaf members of the community, acting as an interpreter for their interactions with public officials, doctors, lawyers, and other private practitioners.

As a proponent of compulsory education for disabled people, Bryan became an advocate for mandatory early education as well as adequate teacher training. In 1912, she participated in a delegation to discuss these ideas with the Minister for Public Instruction, but they were unsuccessful. Because of the difficulty in finding teachers who had the necessary training to work with their students, Bryan used the pupil-teacher method under which she had been trained. Teachers taught during the day, while learning braille, specialized articulation, or sign language at night, or before classroom activities began. In 1916 another delegation attempted to gain acceptance for compulsory education, but was similarly unsuccessful. That year, Bryan attended courses at the Royal Institute for Deaf and Blind Children in Sydney to observe their teaching methods and upon her return made some adjustments to the gestures used at the Queensland school. Two years later primarily because of funding issues, the school was taken over by the Department of Home Affairs, rather than the Department of Public Instruction, making it the first special education school under government supervision, rather than operating as a charity.

Hopeful for change in 1918, Bryan wrote a letter to John Huxham, the Home Secretary, requesting that the salaries for special education teachers be aligned with those of other teachers. No action was taken until two years later, after special education teachers joined the Queensland Teachers' Union and agitated for equitable pay and a reduction in their hours. After a third deputation met with Huxham in 1923, the Blind, Deaf and Dumb Instruction Act of 1924, made education of visually- and hearing-impaired children compulsory in Queensland. Because of the increased enrollment, in 1926, "it was deemed appropriate that a man should take over the school", but Bryan remained in charge of the courses for deaf students, until her 1937 retirement. In 1950, the Edith Bryan Hostel, a facility designed to house and provide medical care for deaf people, was inaugurated at the corner of Free and Goring Streets in Brisbane. Bryan became a volunteer, working at the centre.

== Death and legacy ==
Bryan died on 29 March 1963 in Ascot, Queensland, Australia and was cremated in accordance with her wishes. She is remembered as one of the "two significant pioneers of special education in Queensland", along with John William Tighe.

The Edith Bryan Cup is awarded for the women's team tennis event at the Australian Deaf Games.
