= Harold Davies (Australian footballer) =

Australian rules footballer

Personal information
- Full name: Harold Davies
- Born: 18 November 1932
- Died: 14 September 2002 (aged 69)
- Height: 179 cm (5 ft 10 in)
- Weight: 75 kg (165 lb)
- Position: Defence

Playing career^{1}
| Years | Club | Games (Goals) |
| 1953–59 | St Kilda | 85 (20) |
- ^{1} Playing statistics correct to the end of 1959.

Harold Davies (18 November 1932 – 14 September 2002) was an Australian rules footballer who played with St Kilda in the Victorian Football League (VFL).
