= Claremont Institution =

The Claremont Institution
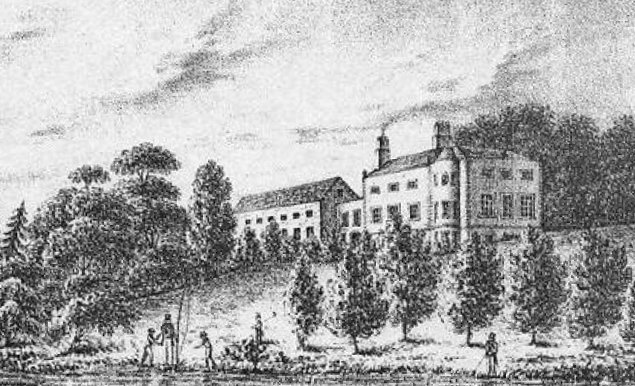
- The Claremont Institution around 1820

Location
- Glasnevin; Dublin; Ireland
- Coordinates: 53°22′19.20″N 6°16′22.80″W

Information
- School type: School for the deaf
- Founder: Dr. Charles Orpen

The Claremont Institution for the Deaf and Dumb at Glasnevin, Dublin, was the first school for the Deaf in Ireland. It was established in 1816 by Dr. Charles Orpen. In the institution it provided structured educational support for the Deaf community by including vocational training and religious instruction. Over time, Claremont became an accredited school that gave broad recognition to Deaf culture and their human rights in the country of Ireland.

== History ==
During his work at the Workhouse of the House of Industry in Dublin in 1816, Dr. Orpen found at least twenty-one deaf children. He selected a deaf and dumb boy, Thomas Collins, for tuition. After devoting his leisure hours, for a few months, to the partial education of the boy at his own house, Dr. Orpen gave a few popular lectures at the Rotunda, in which he brought forward the most striking features in the condition of the Deaf, and the principal facts with respect to the history of their education, as a science recently invented, and the establishment of schools in various countries for their relief. Collins' progress in written language, in calculation, and in articulate speech, after only a few months' instruction, was so satisfactory that the cause of the Deaf was immediately taken up by the public.

The National Institution for Education of the Deaf and Dumb Poor in Ireland was formed shortly afterwards. In 1817 the Committee of this institution hired a small house in Brunswick Street (now Pearse Street) for their pupils.

In 1819 the Committee purchased a large demesne called Claremont with a house near the village of Glasnevin, just outside Dublin. At this time also female pupils were first admitted.

== Alumni and instructors ==
- Edith Lloyd (1872-1963) taught at the school in 1891.
