= Australian Irish Sign Language =

Minority sign language of Australia

- AISL
- Native to: Australia
- Native speakers: ~100 (2017)
- Language family: Francosign: ISL; Australian Irish Sign Language

Language codes
- ISO 639-3: –
- IETF: isg-AU

Australian Irish Sign Language or AISL is a minority sign language in Australia. As a Francosign language, it is related to French Sign Language as opposed to Auslan which is a BANZSL language which is related to British Sign Language. AISL was brought to Australia from Ireland in 1875 by a group of Dominican nuns (including a Deaf nun) where three schools were established and used AISL as a language of instruction. Due to oralist policies, the use of AISL was discontinued as a language of instruction in the early 1950s. There are now around 100 signers of this language, most of who are in their early seventies and onwards, though there may be younger CODAs.

== History ==
According to the Irish Deaf Society, Irish Sign Language (or ISL) "arose from within Deaf communities," "was developed by Deaf people themselves," and "has been in existence for hundreds of years." In 1875, a group of Dominican nuns (including a Deaf nun named Sister Gabriel Hogan) came to Australia from Ireland, bringing with them ISL. From there and the establishment of three schools, AISL was used as a language of instruction until the early 1950s. Prior to the 1875 arrival of ISL, British Sign Language (BSL) came to Australia in 1825 with the arrival of John Carmichael from Edinburgh. The first schools for Deaf children were established in 1860 in both Sydney and Melbourne, however, the trajectory of BSL towards Auslan and that of ISL towards AISL differed. Indeed, it was along the Protestant/Catholic line that the languages were taught, where Protestant schools taught BSL-later-Auslan, and Catholic schools taught ISL-later-AISL.

Both AISL and Auslan, however, stopped being used as languages of instruction after the disastrous Milan Congress of 1881, where by the 1950s, oralism cemented across Australia. Since then, AISL has stopped being used in Deaf clubs or wider community settings, now only being used by small friend groups from the now-closed schools and between family members. Although Australia has a National Policy on Language, it only mentions Auslan (not even Australian Aboriginal sign languages). As of 2017, there were not teachers, professionals, nor interpreters who are able to provide services in AISL.

== See also ==
- Irish Sign Language
- Auslan
- Australian Aboriginal sign languages
- Old French Sign Language
- French Sign Language
