= Charles Orpen =

Irish physician, founded deaf school (1791–1856)

Dr. Charles Edward Herbert Orpen
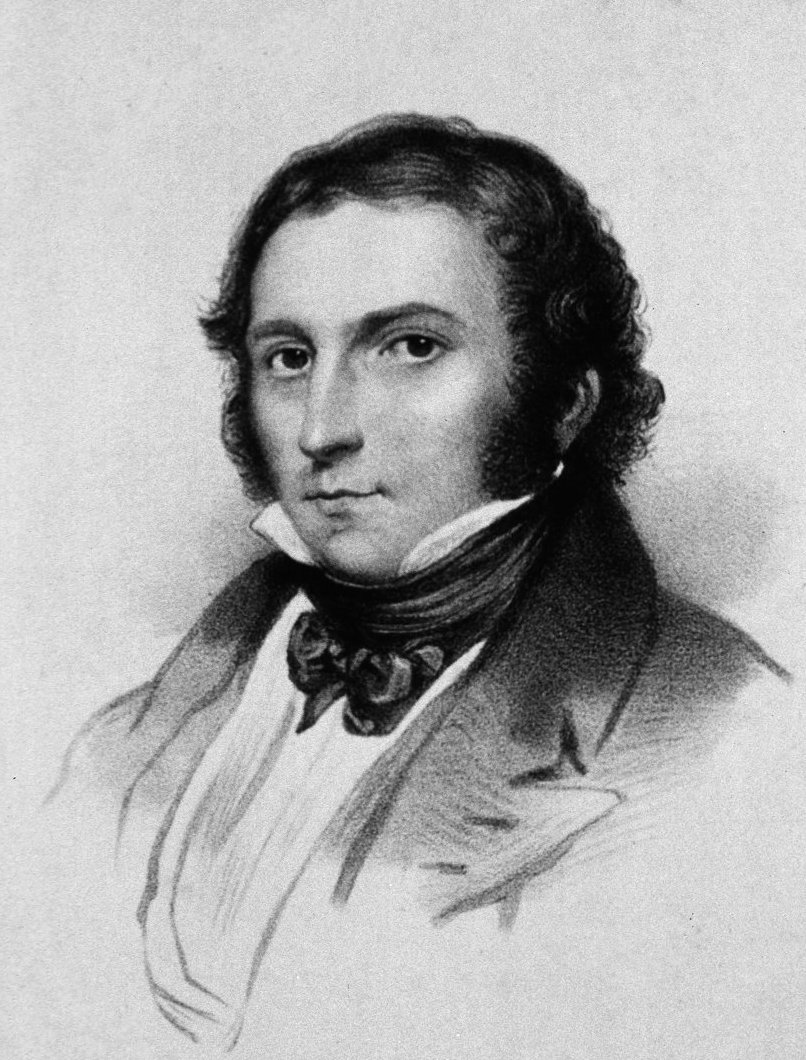
- Born: 31 October 1791; Cork, Ireland
- Died: 20 April 1856 (aged 64); Port Elizabeth, South Africa
- Occupation: Doctor
- Known for: Founder of the Cleremont Institution for the Deaf and Dumb

Dr. Charles Edward Herbert Orpen (31 October 1791 – April 1856) was an Irish medical doctor, writer and clergyman who founded the Claremont Institution for the Deaf and Dumb at Glasnevin, Dublin.

== Life ==
He was born in the city of Cork, the youngest of three sons. The family resided at Dungourney, in the county of Cork, for some years, where his father was vicar. After the death of his father it was decided that Charles should be educated for the medical profession. He was apprenticed to Dr. Gibbings, of Cork. Unfortunately, at the end of his apprenticeship, when he offered himself for examination at the College of Surgeons in Dublin; he first learned, that, as Dr. Gibbings had not been a licentiate of the college, his apprenticeship was not valid. He had to carry out a second apprenticeship of five years with a Surgeon Todd, who took care of him in Dublin, before he could sit his exams, which he passed.

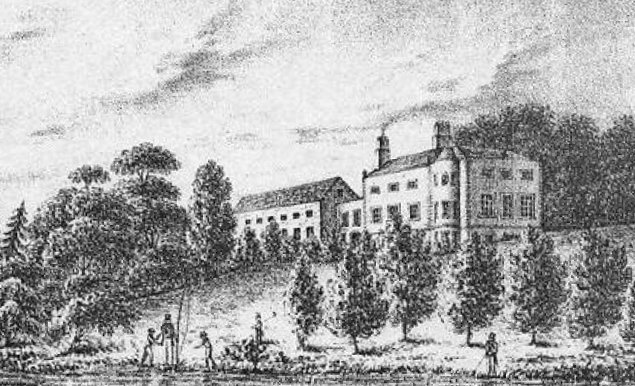
The Claremont Institution around 1820

During his work at the Workhouse of the House of Industry in Dublin in 1816, Orpen found at least twenty-one deaf children. He selected a deaf and dumb boy, Thomas Collins, aged 10, for intensive tuition at his own home. In the following year, Dr Orpen carried out a public demonstration at the Assembly Rooms in the Rotunda, Dublin. Collins' progress in written language, in calculation, and in articulate speech, after only a few months' instruction, was so satisfactory that the cause of the Deaf and Dumb was immediately taken up by the public.

The National Institution for Education of the Deaf and Dumb Poor in Ireland was formed shortly afterwards. The committee of this institution rented two rooms at the Penitentiary, Smithfield, Dublin, for the purpose of educating and boarding a small number of young deaf boys. However, there was a problem finding qualified teachers to educate the boys, and Orpen and friends devoted a considerable amount of time to finding the correct teaching methods and supporting the teachers. Orpen was an advocate of the manual method of Charles-Michel de l'Épée. In 1817, the committee rented a house paid for by the House of Industry in Brunswick Street (now Pearse Street), which provided enough space to teach 16 pupils.

The news of Dr Orpen's initiative led to a demand from rich parents anxious for their deaf children to receive education. The Committee issued a public appeal for funds, and in 1819 purchased a large demesne called Claremont with a house near the village of Glasnevin, just outside Dublin. At this time also female pupils were first admitted.

In 1818 Orpen was appointed a medical inspector, which entailed visiting the homes of thousands of poor people in Dublin during the fever years of 1818/1819. He was shocked at their living conditions and criticised the landlords for the unsanitary condition of their properties. He later wrote a pamphlet based on his experiences, An Address to the Public on the State of the Poor in Dublin, Especially Connected with the Prevention of Cholera.

Orpen was familiar with the Irish language and, being of a religious temperament, supported the efforts of Irish Society for Promoting the Education of the Native Irish through the Medium of Their Own Language to spread the Scriptures in Irish throughout the country. He wrote some tracts for the society.

In 1823 Dr. Orpen married Alicia Frances Coane (née Sirr, daughter of Major Henry Charles Sirr). They had nine children. In 1848 they emigrated to South Africa, where Orpen became a pastor. He established a residence for old and sick ex-slaves and complained about the treatment of the native people by the British and Dutch settlers. He died in Port Elizabeth in 1856. Several of his sons later held government posts in South Africa.
