= Peter Doyle (footballer, born 1955) =

Australian rules footballer

Personal information
- Full name: Peter Doyle
- Born: 27 May 1955 (age 71)
- Original team: Berrigan

Playing career^{1}
| Years | Club | Games (Goals) |
| 1974 — 1978 | Geelong | 38 (15) |
- ^{1} Playing statistics correct to the end of 1978.

Peter Doyle (born 27 May 1955) is a former Australian rules footballer who played for Geelong in the Victorian Football League (now known as the Australian Football League).
