= Brian Chisholm (footballer) =

Australian rules footballer (1938–2023)

Personal information
- Born: 22 February 1938
- Died: 31 May 2023 (aged 85)
- Original team: Berrigan
- Height: 185 cm (6 ft 1 in)
- Weight: 83 kg (183 lb)

Playing career^{1}
Years	Club	Games (Goals)
1960	South Melbourne	12 (1)
- ^{1} Playing statistics correct to the end of 1960.

Brian Chisholm OAM (22 February 1938 – 31 May 2023) was an Australian rules footballer who played with South Melbourne in the Victorian Football League (VFL).

== Order of Australia ==
On 12 June 2023, Brian was posthumously awarded the Medal of the Order of Australia for service to the community of Berrigan. His involvement in the community of Berrigan included:

- Berrigan Sports Ground Management Committee:
  - President, 1996–2011 • Committee Member, 1980–2012. • Groundsman, 1970–2012.
- Berrigan Football Club:
  - Vice President, 1987–1992. Committee Member, 1967–1993. • Member, Centenary Committee, 1994. • Player, 1954–1970. • Life Member, 1968.
- Murray Football League:
  - Board Member, 1985–2002. • Tribunal Member, 1992–2004. • Member, 200 Club, 1968.
- Berrigan Cricket Club:
  - Player, First division, 1956–1970. • Player, Second division, 1980–1987. • Life Member, 1993.
- Community:
  - Former Member, Berrigan Show Society. • Former Member, Berrigan Golf Club.
- Awards and Recognition include:
  - Australian Football League Volunteers Recognition Award, 2018. • Australian Sports Medal, 2000.
