= Brian Gleeson (footballer) =

Australian rules footballer, born 1934

Personal information
- Born: 3 November 1934 (age 92)
- Original team: Berrigan
- Height: 188 cm (6 ft 2 in)
- Weight: 81.5 kg (180 lb)

Playing career^{1}
Years	Club	Games (Goals)
1953–1957	St Kilda	70 (47)
- ^{1} Playing statistics correct to the end of 1957.

Career highlights
- St Kilda Best and Fairest 1957; Brownlow Medallist 1957; Victorian state representative four times

Brian Gleeson (born 3 November 1934) is a former Australian rules footballer in the VFL.

Gleeson attended St Patrick's College, Ballarat, and later played with St Kilda at centre half-forward initially. He developed into a skilful and agile ruckman, winning the Brownlow Medal in 1957. In the Melbourne evening paper The Herald on 29 August 1957 Gleeson said: "We are just like a family at St Kilda," he said. "We depend on teamwork and we bring each other into the game. Coach Alan Killigrew is responsible for that and the officials and supporters have given us encouragement and confidence."

Appointed club captain in 1958, he injured a knee in a practice match and never played VFL football again.

Gleeson and the 1961 Brownlow Medal winner John James (who also finished third to Gleeson in 1957), played in the same team at St Patrick's College.
