= Berrigan, New South Wales =

Berrigan
- Town
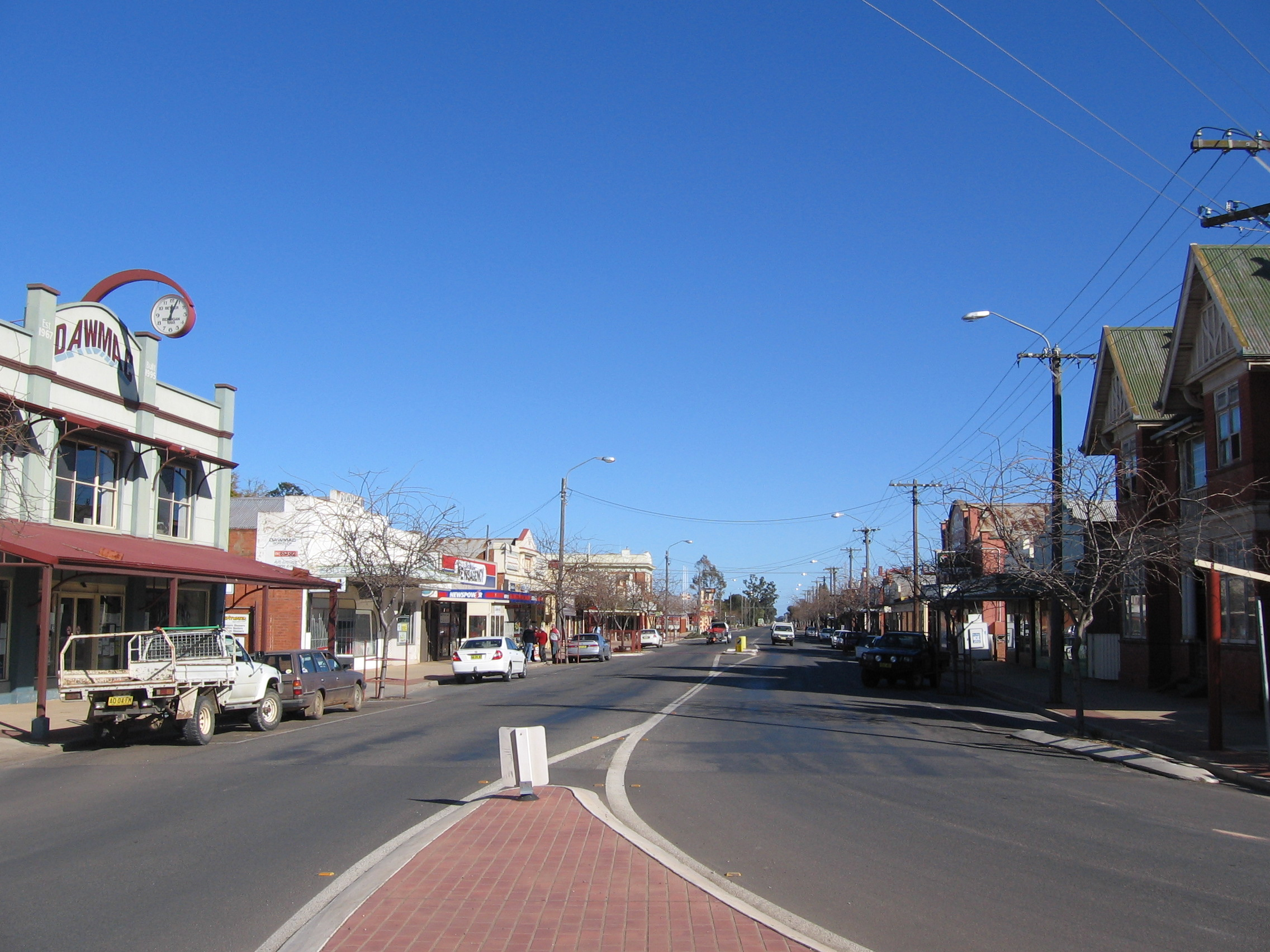
- Chanter Street, Berrigan, looking west; the main street of Berrigan contains a mix of Federation and more-modern architectural styles.

- Coordinates: 35°38′0″S 145°48′0″E
- Country: Australia
- State: New South Wales
- LGA: Berrigan Shire
- Location: 647 km (402 mi) SW of Sydney; 302 km (188 mi) N of Melbourne; 122 km (76 mi) W of Albury; 36 km (22 mi) N of Cobram; 22 km (14 mi) E of Finley

Government
  - State electorate: Murray
  - Federal division: Farrer
- Elevation: 119 m (390 ft)

Population
  - Total: 1,264 (2021 census)
- Postcode: 2712
- County: Denison
- Mean max temp: 22.9 °C (73.2 °F)
- Mean min temp: 9.2 °C (48.6 °F)
- Annual rainfall: 443.3 mm (17.45 in)

Berrigan /ˈbɛriɡən/ is a town on the Riverina Highway in the Riverina region of New South Wales, Australia. Berrigan is in the Berrigan Shire local government area and contains the Berrigan Shire Council offices. At the 2021 census, Berrigan had a population of 1,264.

== History ==
The earliest association with settlement in the area comes in 1849 through the agency of Momalong Station, where Robert Rand had settled some 22.5 thousand acres.

The location of the town was formerly swamp land. The unfavourable location was chosen as the mail run from Corowa to Murray Hut ran through Berrigan on much the same location as the present Riverina Highway, and the road from Jerilderie lies on the same route now as it did back then. The Berrigan Post Office opened on 11 May 1884.

In 1888, the first hotel - Berrigan Hotel - was built on the intersection of the two main roads through to town, with other stores rapidly following along Chanter Street. This hotel still stands today, although it is now a private residence. Other hotels include the Momalong Hotel, also now a private residence, and the Federal Hotel and Royal Hotel, both still active.

Berrigan was officially proclaimed on 31 May 1890, and this only increased the establishment of the commercial section of the town, as well as the residential. The population in 1891 had reached 254, which more than doubled by Federation.

The railway officially opened in late 1896, being the first pioneer light railway in the colony.

The first issue of the Berrigan Advocate was published on Friday, 23 October 1891. The paper eventually merged with the Finley Mail and Tocumwal Guardian & Riverina Stock Journal, becoming the Southern Riverina News in 1970.

=== Involvement in federation ===
Because of its location near the border with Victoria, Berrigan was one of the pioneers in the push for an Australian Federation. It was at the suggestion of the Berrigan Australian Natives' Association that the first meeting of the Federation League was held. Due to its centrality, the meeting was held in Corowa.

== Climate ==
Berrigan experiences a cold semi-arid climate (Köppen: BSk) with hot summers and cool winters, being slightly cooler than Deniliquin due to its latitude. Rainfall is quite low across the year, averaging 443.3 millimetres (17.5 in), though cloud cover can be great in the winter months.

In the very limited 10-year period from 1965 to 1975 that Berrigan recorded temperature extremes, the highest recorded was 46.1 °C (115.0 °F) on 1 February 1968, while the lowest was −4.4 °C (24.1 °F) on 10 July 1965.

Climate data for Berrigan Post Office (1907−1975, rainfall 1875−2016); 119 m AMSL; 35.66° S, 145.81° E
Month	Jan	Feb	Mar	Apr	May	Jun	Jul	Aug	Sep	Oct	Nov	Dec	Year
Record high °C (°F)	44.7 (112.5)	46.1 (115.0)	40.0 (104.0)	32.6 (90.7)	27.0 (80.6)	22.1 (71.8)	25.6 (78.1)	22.8 (73.0)	32.8 (91.0)	36.7 (98.1)	39.4 (102.9)	42.5 (108.5)	46.1 (115.0)
Mean daily maximum °C (°F)	31.9 (89.4)	31.5 (88.7)	28.1 (82.6)	22.8 (73.0)	18.0 (64.4)	14.0 (57.2)	13.5 (56.3)	15.4 (59.7)	19.0 (66.2)	22.9 (73.2)	27.1 (80.8)	30.4 (86.7)	22.9 (73.2)
Mean daily minimum °C (°F)	15.8 (60.4)	15.8 (60.4)	13.2 (55.8)	9.2 (48.6)	6.2 (43.2)	3.8 (38.8)	3.1 (37.6)	3.9 (39.0)	5.8 (42.4)	8.3 (46.9)	11.3 (52.3)	13.9 (57.0)	9.2 (48.5)
Record low °C (°F)	6.7 (44.1)	8.9 (48.0)	4.4 (39.9)	2.2 (36.0)	−2.5 (27.5)	−3.9 (25.0)	−4.4 (24.1)	−3.0 (26.6)	−1.1 (30.0)	−1.1 (30.0)	2.8 (37.0)	6.0 (42.8)	−4.4 (24.1)
Average rainfall mm (inches)	31.2 (1.23)	31.1 (1.22)	34.4 (1.35)	35.3 (1.39)	41.0 (1.61)	43.1 (1.70)	39.3 (1.55)	42.5 (1.67)	38.8 (1.53)	42.0 (1.65)	31.6 (1.24)	33.0 (1.30)	443.3 (17.45)
Average rainy days (≥ 0.2 mm)	3.6	3.2	3.7	4.6	6.8	8.4	9.4	9.3	7.3	6.7	5.0	4.3	72.3
Source: Bureau of Meteorology

== Education ==
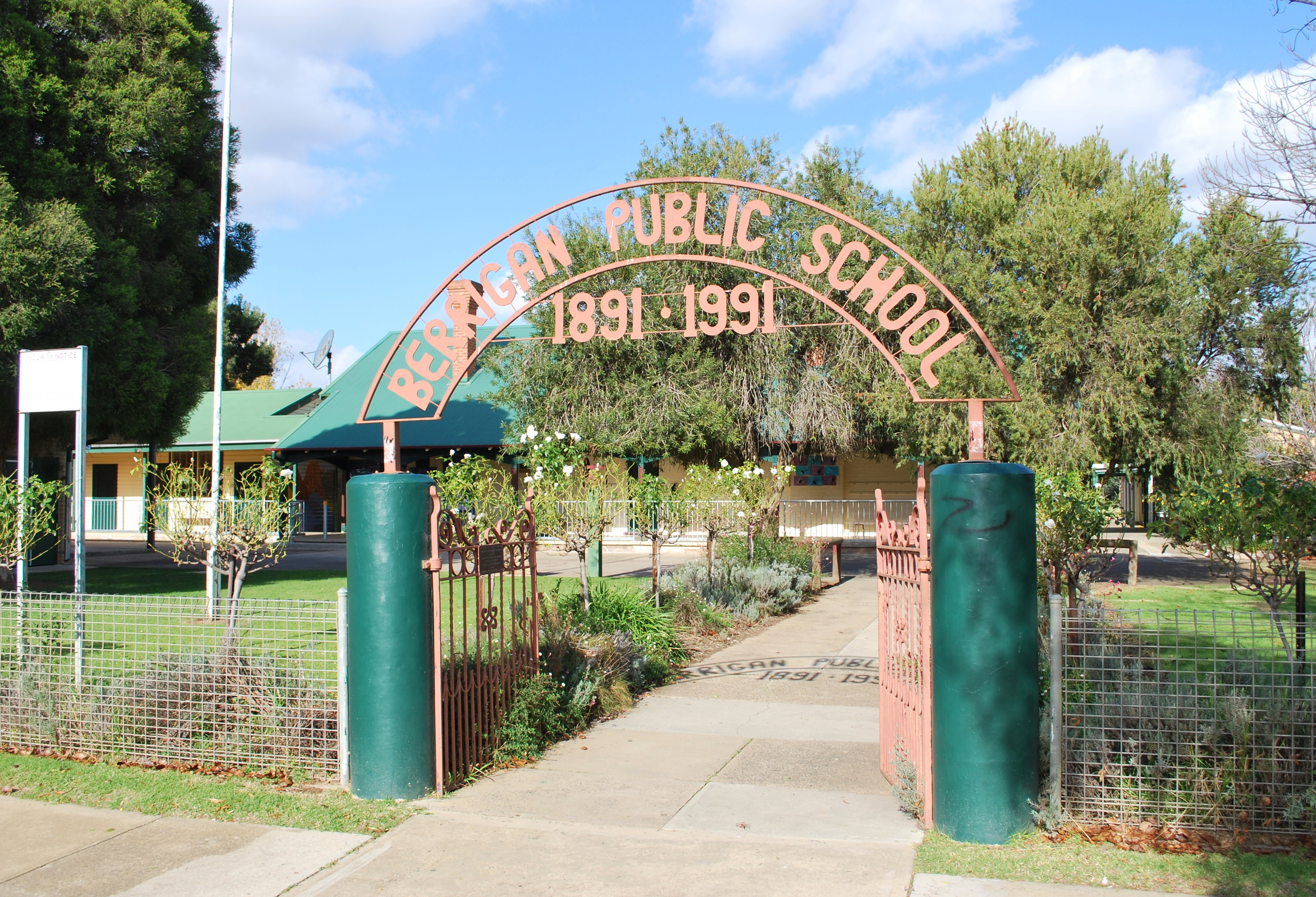
Front gates of Berrigan Public School, celebrating its centenary

Berrigan has a state primary school, with the Catholic primary school having closed at the end of 2020. The nearest high school is in Finley, 22 kilometres (14 mi) to the west. Oaklands has a Central School, that is a part of the Riverina Access Partnership.

== Sport ==
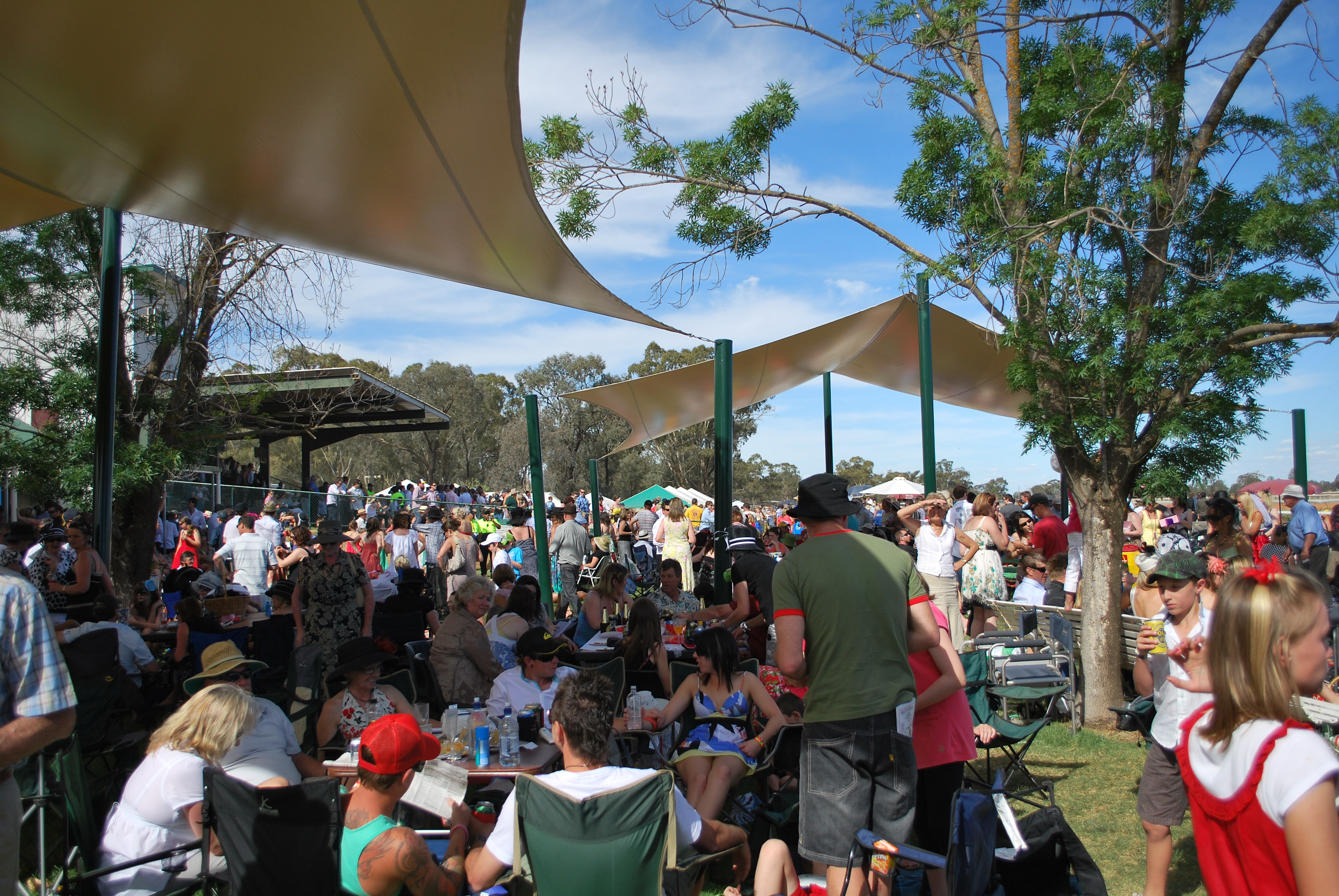
The crowd at the 2008 Berrigan Gold Cup race meeting

Popular sports in Berrigan include Australian rules football (Berrigan Football Club competes in the Picola & District Football League), netball, golf, bowls, and tennis. Horse racing is also popular, with the Berrigan Gold Cup — held on the same day as the Victoria Derby — attracting a large crowd.

== Other attractions ==
Held annually on the Sunday of the October long week (Labour Day) in NSW is the Berrigan Agricultural Show, which has been in existence for over 125 years. A major event previously held in the town was the annual Canola Festival, celebrating the importance of canola to the region. Although this event has since ceased, canola is still an important part of the landscape.

It is also close to the Murray River communities of Barooga and Tocumwal. Located between Berrigan and Barooga is 'The Drop', which is Australia's first hydroelectric power station on an irrigation canal, the Mulwala Canal. The power station had a generating capacity of 2.5 MW of electricity.

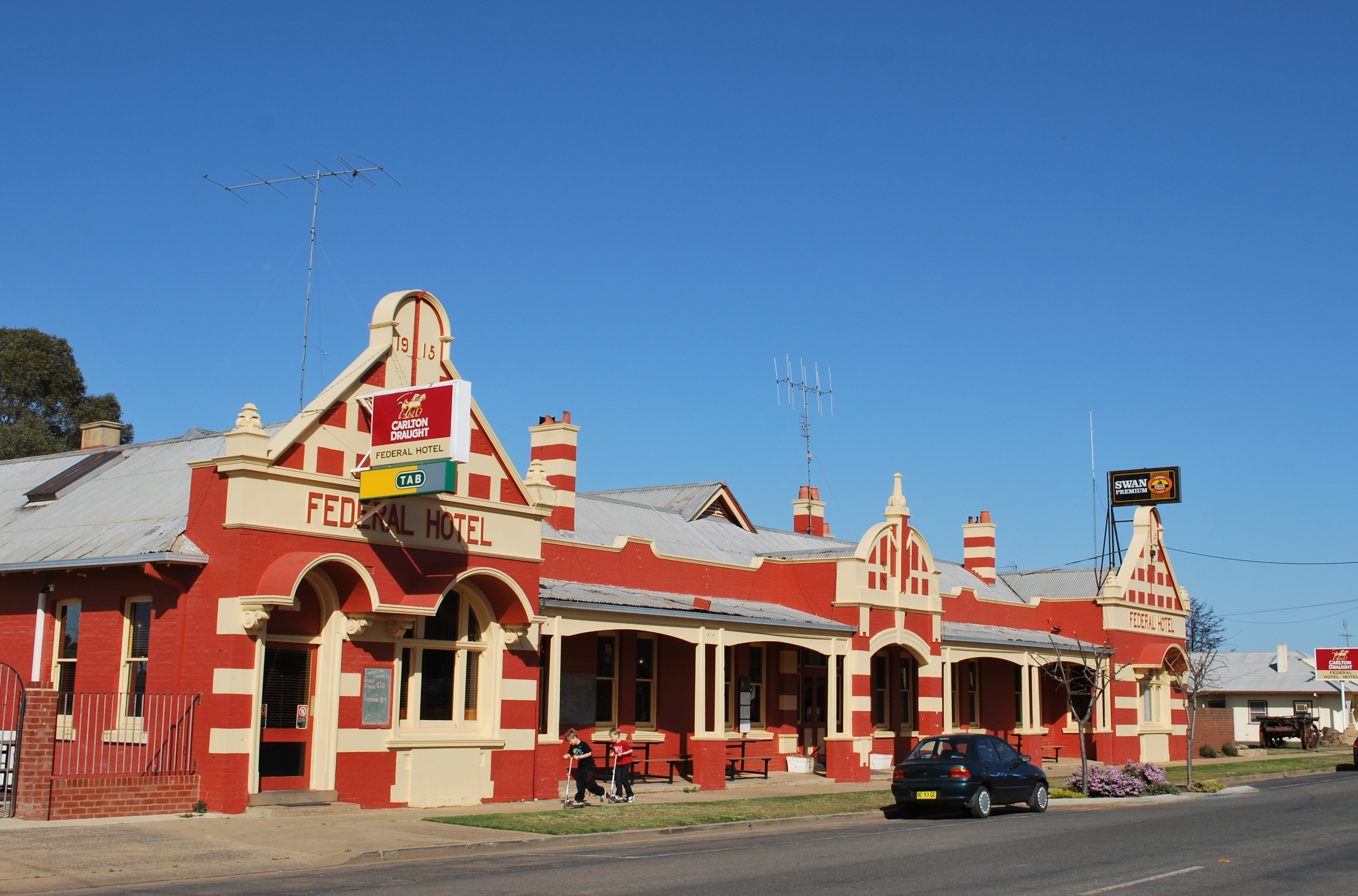
Federal Hotel

Once a thriving town with four pubs and the golf club, it has since been reduced to two pubs and the club.

The ageing population is well catered for in such a small town, with hospice and respite facilities provided. In 2013, an Alzheimer's wing was opened, catering to the numerous residents suffering from the disease.

The localities of Boomanoomana and Mount Gwynne are about 30 km. south.

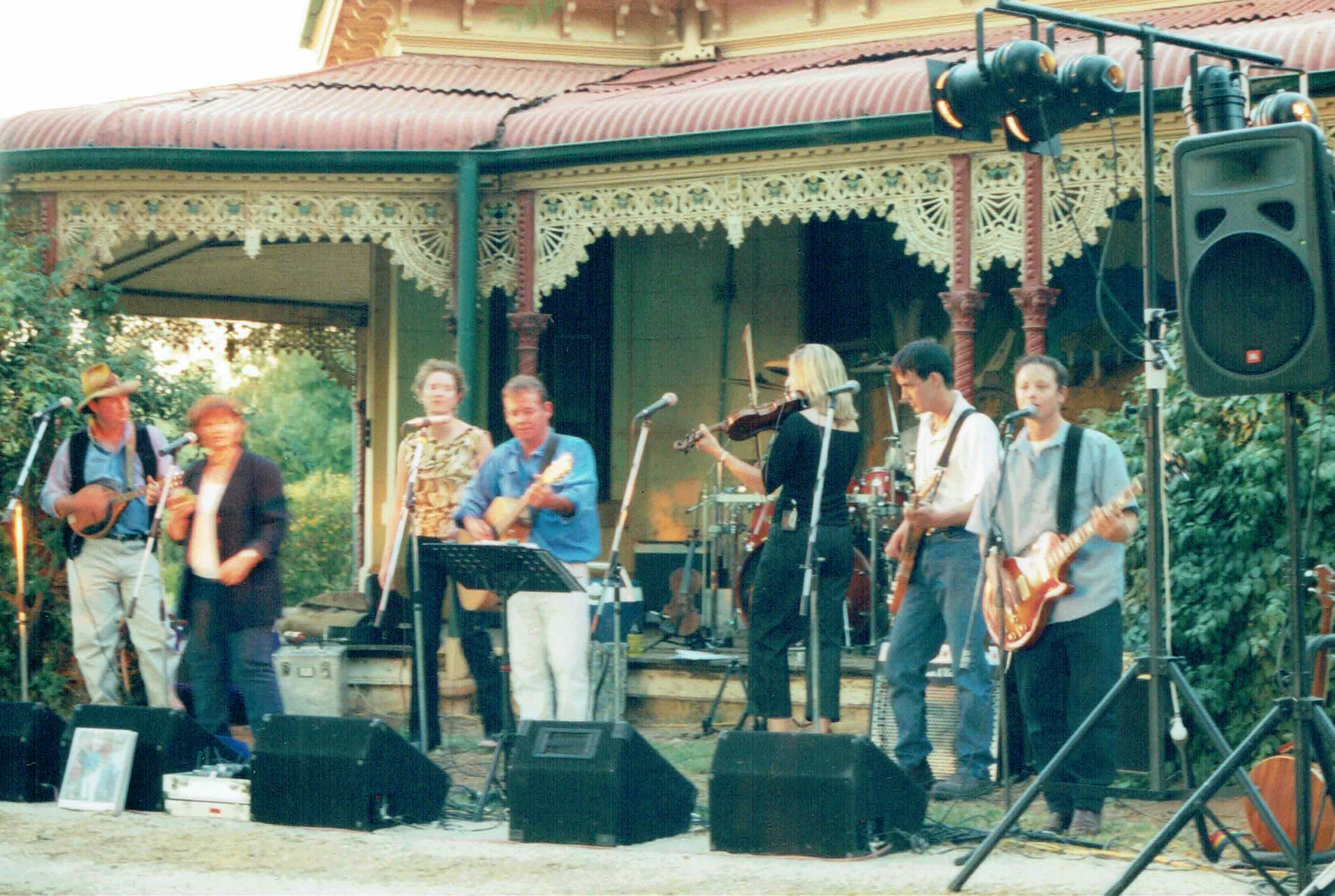
Berrigan Bushdrovers at Nangunia Homestead for the launch of their third album in 2004

== Notable residents ==
- Bernadette Wallis

== Nearby towns ==
- Finley
- Barooga
- Tocumwal
- Jerilderie
- Oaklands
- Cobram
- Mulwala
- Savernake
